= Freshwater fish of Spain =

This is a list of extant freshwater fish that could be found in Spain. The majority of the fish present are from the order Cypriniformes. This list states if the fish are native or introduced. For clarification, an endemic species is a species that is found only in a specific geographic region. IUCN status represents the extinction risk for each species and the fish found in Spain range from least concern to critically endangered.

Fish Currently Believed to be Present
Common name	Scientific name	Family	Order	Occurrence-	IUCN Status	Photo	Wikipedia page (if applicable
Siberian sturgeon	Acipenser baerii	Acipenseridae	Acipenseriformes	Introduced	Endangered		Siberian sturgeon
European Sea Sturgeon	Acipenser sturio	Acipenseridae	Acipenseriformes	Native	Critically endangered		European sea sturgeon
European Eel	Anguilla anguilla	Anguillidae	Anguilliformes	native	Critically Endangered		European eel
Big-scale sand smelt	Atherina boyeri	Atherinidae	Atheriniformes	native	Least concern		Big-scale sand smelt
Freshwater Blennie	Salaria fluviatilis	Blenniidae	Perciformes	native	Least concern		Freshwater blenny
Pumpkinseed	Lepomis gibbosus	Centrarchidae	Perciformes	introduced	Least concern		Pumpkinseed
Largemouth black bass	Micropterus salmoides	Centrarchidae	Perciformes	introduced	Least concern		Largemouth bass
Chameleon Cichlid	Australoheros facetus	Cichlidae	Perciformes	introduced			Australoheros
Rock Goby	Gobius paganellus	Gobiidae	Perciformes	native	not evaluated		Rock goby
European Seabass	Dicentrarchus labrax	Moronidae	Perciformes	native	Least concern		European bass
European Perch	Perca fluviatilis	Percidae	Percifiormes	introduced	Least concern		European perch
Pike-Perch	Sander lucioperca	Percidae	Perciformes	introduced	Least concern		Zander
Allis Shad	Alosa alosa	Clupeidae	Clupeiformes	native	Least concern		Allis shad
Twaite Shad	Alosa fallax	Clupeidae	Clupeiformes	native	Least concern		Twait shad
Sekavec dvoupruhý**	Cobitis bilineata	Cobitidae	Cypriniformes	introduced	Least concern		Cobitis bilineata
Lamprehuela**	Cobitis calderoni	Cobitidae	Cypriniformes	native	Endangered		Cobitis calderoni
Colmilleja**	Cobitis paludica	Cobitidae	Cypriniformes	native	Vulnerable		Cobitis paludica
Spined Loach	Cobitis taenia	Cobitidae	Cypriniformes	native	Least concern		Spined loach
Alagon Spined loach**	Cobitis vettonica	Cobitidae	Cypriniformes	native	Endangered		Cobitis vettonica
Weatherfish	Misgurnus fossilis	Cobitidae	Cypriniformes	introduced	Least Concern		Misgurnus fossilis
Freshwater Bream	Abramis brama	Cyprinidae	Cypriniformes	native	Least concern		Common bream
Unnamed*	Achondrostoma arcasii	Cyprinidae	Cypriniformes	native	Vulnerable		Achondrostoma arcasii
Sarda**	Achondrostoma salmantinum	Cyprinidae	Cypriniformes	native	Endangered		Achondrostoma salmantinum
Bleak	Alburnus alburnus	Cyprinidae	Cypriniformes	introduced	Least concern		Common bleak
Jarabugo	Anaecypris hispanica	Cyprinidae	Cypriniformes	native	Endangered		Anaecypris hispanica
Catalonian Barbel**	Barbus haasi	Cyprinidae	Cypriniformes	endemic	Vulnerable		Barbus haasi
Mediterranean Barbel	Barbus meridionalis	Cyprinidae	Cypriniformes	native	Near threatened		Mediterranean barbel
White bream	Blicca bjoerkna	Cyprinidae	Cypriniformes	introduced	Least concern		Blicca bjoerkna
Goldfish	Carassius auratus	Cyprinidae	Cypriniformes	introduced	Least concern		Goldfish
Crucian Carp	Carassius carassius	Cyprinidae	Cypriniformes	native	Least concern		Crucian carp
Common Carp	Cyprinus carpio	Cyprinidae	Cypriniformes	introduced	Vulnerable		Common carp
Gudgeon	Gobio gobio	Cyprinidae	Cypriniformes	introduced	Least concern		Gobio gobio
Iberian Gudgeon**	Gobio lozanoi	Cyprinidae	Cypriniformes	native	Least concern		Iberian gudgeon
Pardilla**	Iberochondrostoma lemmingii	Cyprinidae	Cypriniformes	native	Vulnerable		Iberochondrostoma lemmingii
Oretanian Pardilla**	Iberochondrostoma oretanum	Cyprinidae	Cypriniformes	endemic	Critically endangered		Iberochondrostoma oretanum
Bogardilla*	Iberocypris palaciosi	Cyprinidae	Cypriniformes	endemic	Critically endangered		Iberocypris palaciosi
Barbo comun**	Luciobarbus bocagei	Cyprinidae	Cypriniformes	native	Least concern		Luciobarbus bocagei
Iberian Barbel	Luciobarbus comizo	Cyprinidae	Cypriniformes	native	Vulnerable		Iberian barbel
Ebro Barbel**	Luciobarbus graellsii	Cyprinidae	Cypriniformes	endemic	Least concern		Luciobarbus graellsii
Valencia Barbel**	Luciobarbus guiraonis	Cyprinidae	Cypriniformes	endemic	Vulnerable		Luciobarbus guiraonis
unnamed*	Luciobarbus microcephalus	Cyprinidae	Cypriniformes	native	Vulnerable		Luciobarbus microcephalus
Andalusian Barbel	Luciobarbus sclateri	Cyprinidae	Cypriniformes	native	Least concern		Andalusian barbel
Loina**	Parachondrostoma arrigonis	Cyprinidae	Cypriniformes	native	Critically endangered		Parachondrostoma arrigonis
unnamed*	Luciobarbus steindachneri	Cyprinidae	Cypriniformes	native	Vulnerable		Luciobarbus steindachneri
Ebro Nase**	Parachondrostoma miegii	Cyprinidae	Cypriniformes	native	Least Concern		Parachondrostoma miegii
Madrilla**	Parachondrostoma toxostoma	Cyprinidae	Cypriniformes	native	Vulnerable		South-west European nase
Madrija**	Parachondrostoma turiensis	Cyprinidae	Cypriniformes	endemic	Endangered		Parachondrostoma turiense
unnamed*	Phoxinus bigerri	Cyprinidae	Cypriniformes	native	Least concern		Phoxinus bigerri
Eurasian minnow	Phoxinus phoxinus	Cyprinidae	Cypriniformes	native	Least concern		Common minnow
unnamed*	Pseudochondrostoma duriense	Cyprinidae	Cypriniformes	native	Vulnerable		Pseudochondrostoma duriense
Iberian Nase	Pseudochondrostoma polyepis	Cyprinidae	Cypriniformes	native	Least concern		Iberian nase
Unnamed*	Pseudochondrostoma willkommii	Cyprinidae	Cypriniformes	native	Vulnerable		Pseudochondrostoma willkommii
Stone Moroko	Pseudorasbora parva	Cyprinidae	Cypriniformes	introduced	Least concern		Stone moroko
Roach	Rutilus rutilus	Cyprinidae	Cypriniformes	introduced	Least concern		Common roach
Rudd	Scardinius erythrophthlamus	Cyprinidae	Cypriniformes	introduced	Least concern		Common rudd
Calandino**	Squalius alburnoides	Cyprinidae	Cypriniformes	native	Vulnerable		Squalius alburnoides
Bordallo	Squalius carolitertii	Cyprinidae	Cypriniformes	native	Least concern		Squalius carolitertii
Unnamed*	Squalius castellanus	Cyprinidae	Cypriniformes	native	Squalius castellanus		Squalius castellanus
Chub	Squalius cephalus	Cyprinidae	Cypriniformes	native	Least concern		Squalius cephalus
Catalan Chub**	Squalius laietanus	Cyprinidae	Cypriniformes	native	Least concern		Squalius laietanus
Malaga Chub**	Squalius malacitanus	Cyprinidae	Cypriniformes	native	Endangered		Squalius malacitanus
unnamed*	Squalius pyrenaicus	Cyprinidae	Cypriniformes	native			Squalius pyrenaicus
Valencia Chub**	Squalius valentinus	Cyprinidae	Cypriniformes	native	Vulnerable		Squalius valentinus
Tench	Tinca tinca	Cyprinidae	Cypriniformes	native	Least concern		Tench
Stone loach	Barbatula barbatula	Nemacheilidae	Cypriniformes	native	Least concern		Stone loach
Unnamed*	Barbatula quignardi	Nemacheilidae	Cypriniformes	native	Least concern		Barbatula quignardi
Unnamed*	Triplophysa coniptera	Nemacheilidae	Cypriniformes	native			Triplophysa coniptera
Chabot du Bearn	Cottus aturi	Cottidae	Scorpaeniformes	native	Least concern		Cottus aturi
Bullhead	Cottus gobio	Cottidae	Scorpaeniformes	native	Least concern		European bullhead
Chabot des Pyrenees	Cottus hispaniolensis	Cottidae	Scorpaeniformes	native	Least concern		Cottus hispaniolensis
Guadalquivir toothcarp**	Aphanius baeticus	Cyprinodontidae	Cyprinodontiformes	endemic	Endangered		Aphanius baeticus
Spanish toothcarp	Aphanius iberus	Cyprinodontidae	Cyprinodontiformes	native	Endangered		Spanish toothcarp
Mummichog	Fundulus hetroclitus	Fundulidae	Cyprinodontiformes	introduced	Least concern		Mummichog
Mosquitofish	Gambusia affinis	Poeciliidae	Cyprinodontiformes	introduced	Least concern		Mosquitofish
Eastern Mosquitofish	Gambusia holbrooki	Poeciliidae	Cyprinodontiformes	introduced	Least concern		Eastern mosquitofish
Guppy	Poecilia reticulata	Poeciliidae	Cyprinodontiformes	introduced			Guppy
Valencia Toothcarp	Valencia hispanica	Valenciidae	Cyprinodontiformes	native	Critically endangered		Valencia toothcarp
Northern Pike	Esox lucius	Esocidae	Esociformes	introduced	Least concern		Northern pike
Three Spined Stickleback	Gasterosteus aculeatus	Gasterosteidae	Gasterosteiformes	native	Least concern		Three-spined stickleback
Black bullhead	Ameiurus melas	Ictaluridae	Siluriformes	introduced	Least concern		Black bullhead
Brown bullhead	Ameiurus nebulosus	Ictaluridae	Siluriformes	introduced	Least concern		Brown bullhead
Channel catfish	Ictalurus punctatus	Ictaluridae	Siluriformes	introduced	Least concern		Channel catfish
Wels catfish	Silurus glanis	Siluridae	Siluriformes	introduced	Least concern		Wels catfish
Golden grey mullet	Chelon auratus	Mugilidae	Mugiliformes	native	Least concern		Golden grey mullet
Thicklip grey mullet	Chelon labrosus	Mugilidae	Mugiliformes	native	Least concern		Thicklip grey mullet
Thinlip grey mullet	Chelon ramada	Mugilidae	Mugiliformes	native			Thinlip mullet
Leaping mullet	Chelon saliens	Mugilidae	Mugiliformes	native	Least concern		Leaping mullet
Flathead grey mullet	Mugil cephalus	Mugilidae	Mugiliformes	native	Least concern		Flathead grey mullet
European brook lamprey	Lampetra planeri	Petromyzontidae	Petromyzontiformes	native	Least concern		Brook lamprey
Sea lamprey	Petromyzon marinus	Petromyzontidae	Petromyzontiformes	native	Least concern		Sea lamprey
European flounder	Platichthys flesus	Pleuronectidae	Pleuronectiformes	native	Least concern		European flounder
Huchen	Hucho hucho	Salmonidae	Salmoniformes	introduced	Endangered		Huchen
Rainbow trout	Oncorhynchus mykiss	Salmonidae	Salmoniformes	introduced			Rainbow trout
Atlantic salmon	Salmo Salar	Salmonidae	Salmoniformes	native	Least concern		Atlantic salmon
Brown trout, sea trout	Salmo trutta	Salmonidae	Salmoniformes	native	Least concern		Brown trout
Brook trout	Salvelinus fontinalis	Salmonidae	Salmoniformes	introduced			Brook trout
Black striped pipefish	Sygnathus abaster	Syngnathidae	Syngnathiformes	native	Least concern		Black-striped pipefish

Notes:

*- denotes fish that did not have a common name listed on fishbase.

**- denotes fish that did not have a common name listed on fishbase, but had a local name listed
