= Sakarya chub =

Conservation status
- Least Concern (IUCN 3.1)

Scientific classification
- Kingdom: Animalia
- Phylum: Chordata
- Class: Actinopterygii
- Order: Cypriniformes
- Family: Leuciscidae
- Subfamily: Leuciscinae
- Genus: Squalius
- Species: S. pursakensis

Binomial name
- Squalius pursakensis (Hankó (hu), 1925)

Synonyms
- Leuciscus orientalis var. pursakensis Hankó, 1925—

Species of fish

The Sakarya chub (Squalius pursakensis) is a species of freshwater ray-finned fish belonging to the family Leuciscidae, the daces, Eurasian minnows and related fishes. It is found in the Sakarya River drainage in Turkey.
