= Squalius prespensis =

Conservation status
- Endangered (IUCN 3.1)

Scientific classification
- Kingdom: Animalia
- Phylum: Chordata
- Class: Actinopterygii
- Order: Cypriniformes
- Family: Leuciscidae
- Subfamily: Leuciscinae
- Genus: Squalius
- Species: S. prespensis

Binomial name
- Squalius prespensis (Fowler, 1977)

Synonyms
- Leuciscus cephalus prespensis Fowler, 1977

Species of fish

Squalius prespensis, the Prespa chub, is a species of freshwater ray-finned fish belonging to the family Leuciscidae, the daces, Eurasian minnows and related fishes. This fish grows to 25 cm (9.8 in) SL. It was originally described as a subspecies of European chub.

Squalius prespensis is endemic to the Lake Prespa basin, shared between Albania, Greece, and North Macedonia. It is abundant within its restricted habitat, and seems to have increased in abundance in recent years. However, it is potentially threatened by overfishing, water extraction, and pollution.
