= Squalius peloponensis =

Conservation status
- Least Concern (IUCN 3.1)

Scientific classification
- Kingdom: Animalia
- Phylum: Chordata
- Class: Actinopterygii
- Order: Cypriniformes
- Family: Leuciscidae
- Subfamily: Leuciscinae
- Genus: Squalius
- Species: S. peloponensis

Binomial name
- Squalius peloponensis (Valenciennes, 1844)

Synonyms
- Leuciscus peloponensis Valenciennes, 1844

Species of fish

Squalius peloponensis, the Peloponnese chub, is a species of freshwater ray-finned fish belonging to the family Leuciscidae, which includes the daces, Eurasian minnows and related species. This fish is endemic to Greece.

== Taxonomy ==
Squalius peloponensis was first formally described as Leuciscus peloponensis in 1844 by the French zoologist Achille Valenciennes, with its type locality given as Morea, i.e. the Peloponnese Peninsula, in Greece. This taxon was regarded as a subspecies of the common chub (S. cephalus, but is now considered to be a valid species within the genus Squalius, belonging to the subfamily Leuciscinae of the family Leuciscidae.

== Etymology ==
Squalius peloponensis belongs to the genus Squalius. This name was proposed by the French biologist Charles Lucien Bonaparte in 1837 for a subgenus of the genus Leuciscus for the Italian chub (Squalius cephalus), inserting an additional "i" to prevent homonymy with the spurdog genus Squalus. In classical Latin the chub and the spurdog were homonyms as squalus. An alternative explanation was that the name is a latinisation of squaglio, a vernacular name for the Italian chub in Rome and its environs. The specific name, peloponensis, suffixes -ensis, denoting place, onto Peloponnese, the type locality.

== Description ==
Squalius peloponensis is told apart from other Balkan chubs by the possession of a black mark on the front half of the anal fin with the rear margin of that fin being slightly convex; the dorsal fin contains 8 to 9 1/2 branched rays. The mouth is located under the nose, and the upper lip clearly projects past the lower jaw. This species has a maximum standard length of 30 cm (12 in).

== Distribution and habitat ==
Squalius peloponensis is endemic to western Greece in rivers draining into the Ionian Sea from the Achelous in the north to the Mornos River in the southern mainland, and in all river catchments in the western Peloponnese, other than the Neda. There is also an introduced population in the Dafnon River in the eastern Peloponnese. The Peloponnese chub is found in a wide variety of waters, including rivers, streams, canals and reservoirs.
