= Squalius orpheus =

Conservation status
- Least Concern (IUCN 3.1)

Scientific classification
- Kingdom: Animalia
- Phylum: Chordata
- Class: Actinopterygii
- Order: Cypriniformes
- Family: Leuciscidae
- Subfamily: Leuciscinae
- Genus: Squalius
- Species: S. orpheus

Binomial name
- Squalius orpheus Kottelat & Economidis, 2006

Species of fish

Squalius orpheus, the Thracian chub or Orpheus dace, is a species of freshwater ray-finned fish belonging to the family Leuciscidae, the daces, Eurasian minnows and related fishes. This species is endemic to the Maritsa drainage in Bulgaria, Greece, North Macedonia, Serbia, and Turkey.
