= Trasimeno chub =

Conservation status
- Endangered (IUCN 3.1)

Scientific classification
- Kingdom: Animalia
- Phylum: Chordata
- Class: Actinopterygii
- Order: Cypriniformes
- Family: Leuciscidae
- Subfamily: Leuciscinae
- Genus: Squalius
- Species: S. albus

Binomial name
- Squalius albus (Bonaparte, 1838)

Synonyms
- Leuciscus albus Bonaparte, 1838

Species of fish

The Trasimeno chub (Squalius albus) is a species of freshwater ray-finned fish belonging to the family Leuciscidae, which includes the daces, Eurasian minnows and related fishes. This species is endemic to Lake Trasimeno in Italy.

== Taxonomy ==
The Trasimeno chub was first formally described as Leuciscus albus in 1838 by the French art collector and biologist Charles Lucien Bonaparte, with its type locality given as Lake Trasimeno in Italy. This taxon has been considered to be a synonym of S. squalus. The Trasimeno chub belongs to the genus Squalius, commonly referred to as chubs, which belongs to the subfamily Leuciscinae of the family Leuciscidae.

== Etymology ==
The Trasimeno chub belongs to the genus Squalius. This name was proposed by Bonaparte in 1837 for a subgenus of the genus Leuciscus for the Italian chub (Squalius squalus), inserting an additional "i" to prevent homonymy with the spurdog genus Squalus. In classical Latin the chub and the spurdog were homonyms as squalus. An alternative explanation was that the name is a latinisation of squaglio, a vernacular name for the common chub in Rome and its environs. The specific name, albus, means "white"; Bonaparte described the colour as "ashen white".

== Distribution and habitat ==
The Trasimeno chub is endemic to Lake Trasimene in Umbria, where it is most abundant in the pelagic zone.

== Conservation ==
The Trasimene chub is classified as Endangered by the International Union for Conservation of Nature. The threats to this species include non-native invasive species, water abstraction, pollution and possible hybridisation with the Italian chub, which has been introduced to the lake.
