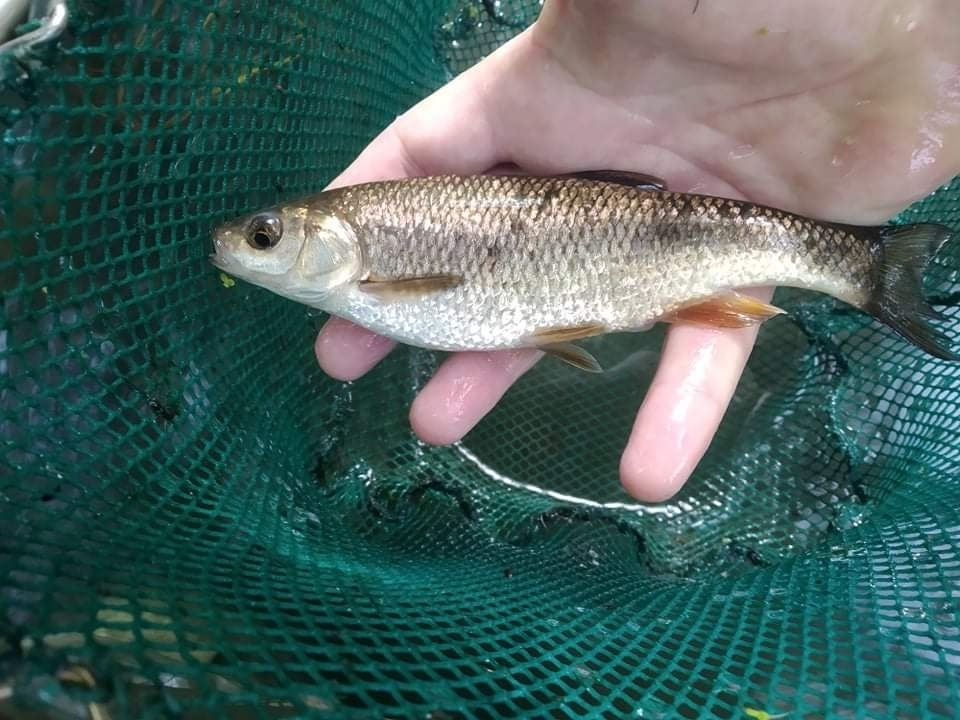

Conservation status
- Endangered (IUCN 3.1)

Scientific classification
- Kingdom: Animalia
- Phylum: Chordata
- Class: Actinopterygii
- Division: Teleostei
- Order: Cypriniformes
- Family: Leuciscidae
- Genus: Squalius
- Species: S. keadicus

Binomial name
- Squalius keadicus (Stephanidis, 1971)

Synonyms
- Leuciscus (Telestes) souffia ssp. keadicus Stephanidis, 1971; Leuciscus keadicus Stephanidis, 1971

= Squalius keadicus =

Species of fish

Squalius keadicus is a species of freshwater ray-finned fish belonging to the family Leuciscidae, the daces, Eurasian minnows and related fishes. It is endemic to Greece, and known as the menida in Greek.

It is endemic to the Evrotas drainage and the Vassilopotamos stream in the southern Peloponnese.

== Taxonomy ==
Phylogenetic studies on Leuciscinae provide evidence about the uniqueness of S. keadicus as an element of the ancient ichthyofauna and one of the most ancestral Leuciscus s. l. taxa of Greece, and perhaps of Europe.

== Description ==
The body is laterally compressed with dark brownish-blue colouration. D III/8, A III/8–9 (10), C 19, P I/13–15, V/II 7–9, Ll. 44–51, L. transverse 9–10/3–4, gill rakers 7–9, vertebrae 38–42, mouth subterminal. Maximum body length: the species grows up to 25 cm (9.8 in) TL, but more recently the longest specimen found had reduced to 15 cm (5.9 in) SL. Sexual dimorphism: males are smaller in size and with rather bigger pectoral and pelvic fins than females.

=== Habitat ===
According to Crivelli, S. keadicus prefers habitats with slow current. Barbieri et al, however, reported the species as energetic and strongly rheophilic, living in open sites of the river, on stony bottoms with a fast flow and relatively cool water. It feeds throughout the water column, principally on aquatic insects. The strongly rheophilic behaviour confines the species to river sections of increased flow, an area which is estimated to be far less than 10 km^{2} (3.9 sq mi).

=== Reproduction ===
It matures in the second year of life (males possibly mature in the first). The breeding season is generally restricted in mid-spring. The species produces adhesive yellowish eggs, about 2 mm (3/32 in) in diameter, from which unpigmented embryos, about 5.1 mm (3/16 in) in TL, hatch out.

== Conservation ==
It is threatened by habitat loss. The major threats are summer drought and concomitant water over-abstraction that lead to habitat degradation and loss. In the last decade, all tributaries and a large portion of the river dry up completely during summer. In addition, pollution from the local agricultural industries degrades water quality, especially during dry periods, leading to sudden mass mortalities. One of the possible consequences of the population decline is the reduction of the species' genetic diversity, which imposes a serious threat, as it lowers its ability to cope with adverse environmental changes. In the past, S. keadicus was abundant along its entire distribution area. In recent years, the population size in Evrotas has dramatically reduced. Moreover, the Vassilopotamos population is possibly extinct. It is protected by Presidential Decree No. 67/1981 of the Greek State.

== Notes ==
Squalius was formerly a subgenus of Leuciscus.
