= Adana chub =

Conservation status
- Near Threatened (IUCN 3.1)

Scientific classification
- Kingdom: Animalia
- Phylum: Chordata
- Class: Actinopterygii
- Order: Cypriniformes
- Family: Leuciscidae
- Subfamily: Leuciscinae
- Genus: Squalius
- Species: S. adanaensis

Binomial name
- Squalius adanaensis Turan, Kottelat & Doğan, 2013

Species of fish

The Adana chub (Squalius adanaensis) is a species of freshwater ray-finned fish belonging to the family Leuciscidae, which includes the daces, Eurasian minnows and related fishes. This species is endemic to the Seyhan River in southeastern Turkey.

== Taxonomy ==
The Adana chub was first formally described in 2013 by Maurice Kottelat and Esra Doğan, with its type locality given as the Üçürge Stream at Karaisalı in the Seyhan River drainage system in the Adana Province of Turkey. The Adana chub belongs to the genus Squalius, commonly referred to as chubs, which belongs to the subfamily Leuciscinae of the family Leuciscidae.

== Etymology ==
The Adana chub belongs to the genus Squalius. This name was proposed by the French biologist Charles Lucien Bonaparte in 1837 for a subgenus of the genus Leuciscus for the Italian chub (Squalius cephalus), inserting an additional "i" to prevent homonymy with the spurdog genus Squalus. In classical Latin the chub and the spurdog were homonyms as squalus. An alternative explanation was that the name is a latinisation of squaglio, a vernacular name for the Italian chub in Rome and its environs. The specific name, adanaensis, means "of Adana", referring to the type locality being in Adana Province.

== Distribution and habitat ==
The Adana chub is endemic to the lower drainage basin of the Syehan River in Adana Province, Turkey. Here it is found in the low-lying reaches of rivers and streams. It is also found in the reservoirs of the Seyhan Dam, but it probably migrates upstream into the rivers flowing into the reservoir to breed.

== Conservation ==
The Adana chub is classified as Near Threatened by the International Union for Conservation of Nature. The threats to this species are pollution, water abstraction and damming.
