= Stymphalia chub =

Conservation status
- Endangered (IUCN 3.1)

Scientific classification
- Kingdom: Animalia
- Phylum: Chordata
- Class: Actinopterygii
- Order: Cypriniformes
- Family: Leuciscidae
- Subfamily: Leuciscinae
- Genus: Squalius
- Species: S. moreoticus

Binomial name
- Squalius moreoticus (Stephanidis, 1971)

Synonyms
- Leuciscus (Squalius) cephalus moreoticus Stephanidis, 1971

Species of fish

The Stymphalia chub (Squalius moreoticus) is a species of freshwater ray-finned fish belonging to the family Leuciscidae, which includes the daces, Eurasian minnows and related species. This fish is endemic to Greece.

== Taxonomy ==
The Stymphalia chub was first formally described as Leuciscus (Squalius) cephalus moreoticus in 1971 by the Greek zoologist Alexander I. Stephanidis, with its type locality given as Stymphalis Lake, Peloponnesus, i.e. the Peloponnese Peninsula, in Greece. This taxon was regarded as a synonym of the common chub (S. cephalus, but is now considered to be a valid species within the genus Squalius, belonging to the subfamily Leuciscinae of the family Leuciscidae.

== Etymology ==
The Stymphalia chub belongs to the genus Squalius. This name was proposed by the French biologist Charles Lucien Bonaparte in 1837 for a subgenus of the genus Leuciscus for the Italian chub (Squalius cephalus), inserting an additional "i" to prevent homonymy with the spurdog genus Squalus. In classical Latin the chub and the spurdog were homonyms as squalus. An alternative explanation was that the name is a latinisation of squaglio, a vernacular name for the Italian chub in Rome and its environs. The specific name, moreoticus, means "belonging to Morea", a former name for the Peloponnese Peninsula where the Lake Stymphalia, the type locality, is located.

== Description ==
The Stymphalia chub is told apart from other Balkan chubs by the anal fin having a straight rear margin. The dorsal fin typically has 9 1/2 branched rays, and the mouth is terminal. This species has a maximum standard length of 21 cm (8.3 in).

== Distribution ==
The Stymphalia chub is endemic to southern Greece, where it is restricted to the Lake Stymphalia basin and the nearby Vouraikos catchment in the northeastern Peloponnese.
