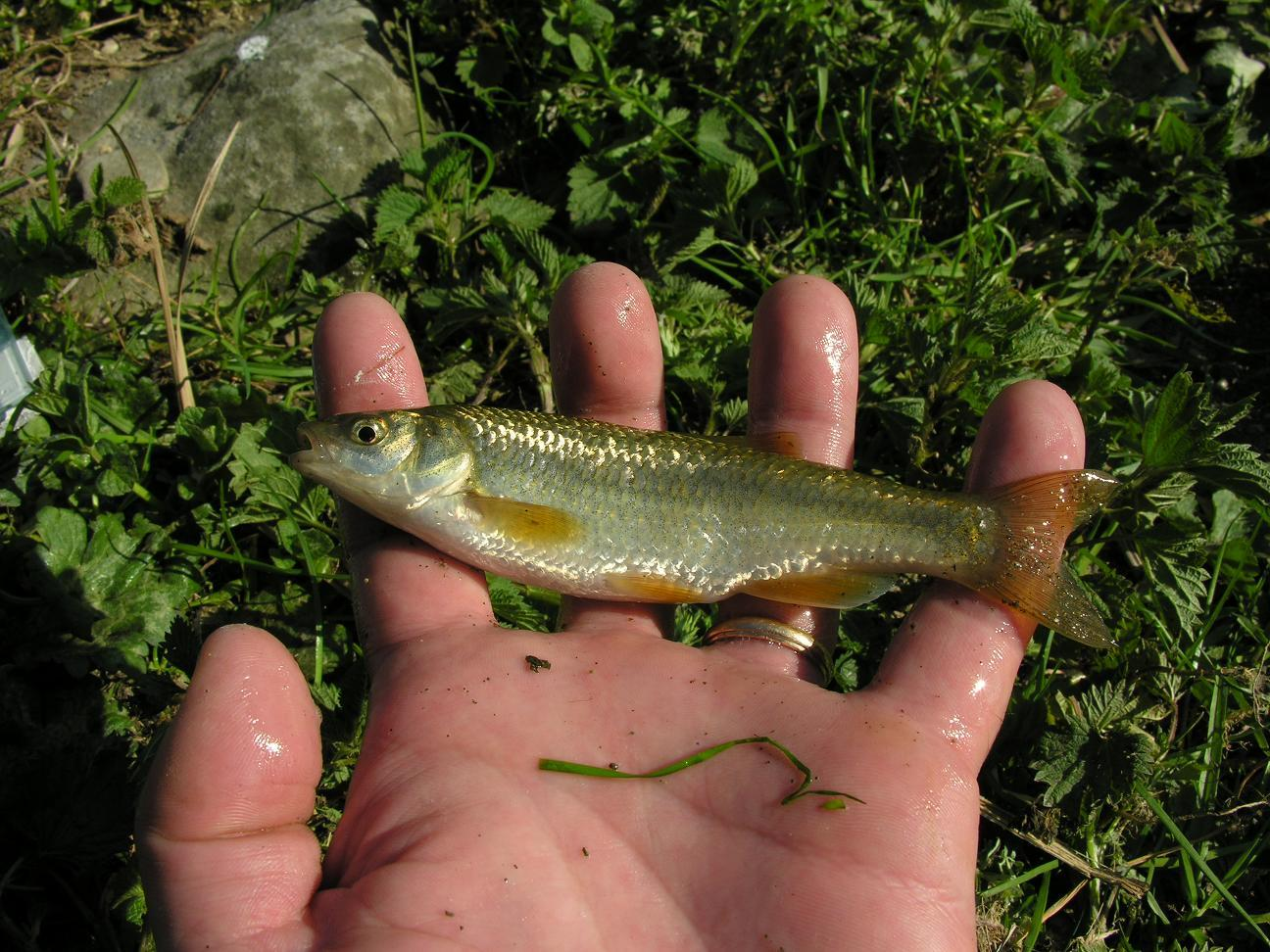
- Leuciscus lucumonis in the palm of a hand

Conservation status
- Critically Endangered (IUCN 3.1)

Scientific classification
- Kingdom: Animalia
- Phylum: Chordata
- Class: Actinopterygii
- Order: Cypriniformes
- Family: Leuciscidae
- Subfamily: Leuciscinae
- Genus: Squalius
- Species: S. lucumonis

Binomial name
- Squalius lucumonis (Bianco, 1983)

Synonyms
- Leuciscus lucumonis Bianco, 1983

= Squalius lucumonis =

Species of fish

Squalius lucumonis, the Etruscan chub, is a species of freshwater ray-finned fish belonging to the family Leuciscidae, the daces, Eurasian minnows and related fishes. This species is endemic to Italy.

Its natural habitat is within rivers.
