= Squalius palaciosi =

Jándula chub

Conservation status
- Extinct (yes) (IUCN 3.1)

Scientific classification
- Kingdom: Animalia
- Phylum: Chordata
- Class: Actinopterygii
- Order: Cypriniformes
- Family: Leuciscidae
- Subfamily: Leuciscinae
- Genus: Squalius
- Species: †S. palaciosi

Binomial name
- †Squalius palaciosi (Doadrio, 1980)
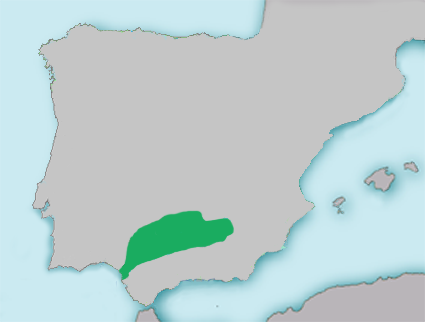
- Distribution of Iberocypris palaciosi

Synonyms
- Iberocypris palaciosi Doadrio, 1980

Species of fish

Squalius palaciosi, the bogardilla or Jándula chub, is an extinct species of freshwater ray-finned fish belonging to the family Leuciscidae, which includes the daces, Eurasian minnows and related fishes. This species was endemic to Spain.

== Taxonomy ==
Squalius palaciosi was first formally described as Iberocypris palaciosi in 1980 by Spanish ichthyologist Ignacio Doadrio, with its type locality given as the Río Jándula, Lugar Nuevo, Andújar, Spain. Some authorities continue to classify this species, and S. alburnoides, in the genus Iberocypris, both taxa being the result of hybridisation between S. pyrenaicus and an unknown related fish taxa. However, Eschmeyer's Catalog of Fishes now classifies this species in the genus Squalius, commonly referred to as chubs, which belongs to the subfamily Leuciscinae of the family Leuciscidae.

== Etymology ==
Squalius palaciosi belongs to the genus Squalius. This name was proposed by the French biologist Charles Lucien Bonaparte in 1837 for a subgenus of the genus Leuciscus for the Italian chub (Squalius cephalus), inserting an additional "i" to prevent homonymy with the spurdog genus Squalus. In classical Latin the chub and the spurdog were homonyms as squalus. An alternative explanation was that the name is a latinisation of squaglio, a vernacular name for the Italian chub in Rome and its environs. The specific name, palaciosi, is an eponym, honouring Fernando Palacios Arribas of the Museo Nacional de Ciencias Naturales in Madrid in recognition of his studies of Spanish vertebrates.

== Distribution and habitat ==
Squalius palaciosi was endemic to Andalusia in Spain, where it was found only in the Jándula and Rumblar rivers, right handed tributaries of the Guadalquivir River. This species preferred stretches of river or stream with a current, a stony or rocky bed and abundant aquatic vegetation.

== Extinction ==
Squalius palaciosi has not been recorded since the late 1990s. Damming and the introduction of non-native invasive species are thought to be the main reasons for it becoming extinct.
