= Squalius cii =

Conservation status
- Least Concern (IUCN 3.1)

Scientific classification
- Kingdom: Animalia
- Phylum: Chordata
- Class: Actinopterygii
- Order: Cypriniformes
- Family: Leuciscidae
- Genus: Squalius
- Species: S. cii

Binomial name
- Squalius cii (Richardson, 1857)

Species of fish

Squalius cii, the Marmara chub, is a species of freshwater ray-finned fish belonging to the family Leuciscidae, the daces, Eurasian minnows and related fishes. This species is endemic to Turkey and Lesbos.
