= Squalius lepidus =

Conservation status
- Least Concern (IUCN 3.1)

Scientific classification
- Kingdom: Animalia
- Phylum: Chordata
- Class: Actinopterygii
- Order: Cypriniformes
- Family: Leuciscidae
- Subfamily: Leuciscinae
- Genus: Squalius
- Species: S. lepidus

Binomial name
- Squalius lepidus Heckel, 1843

Synonyms
- Leuciscus lepidus (Heckel, 1843)

Species of fish

Squalius lepidus, also known as the Mesopotamian pike chub, is a species of freshwater ray-finned fish belonging to the family Leuciscidae, the daces, Eurasian minnows and related fishes. It is found in the Tigris-Euphrates basin.
