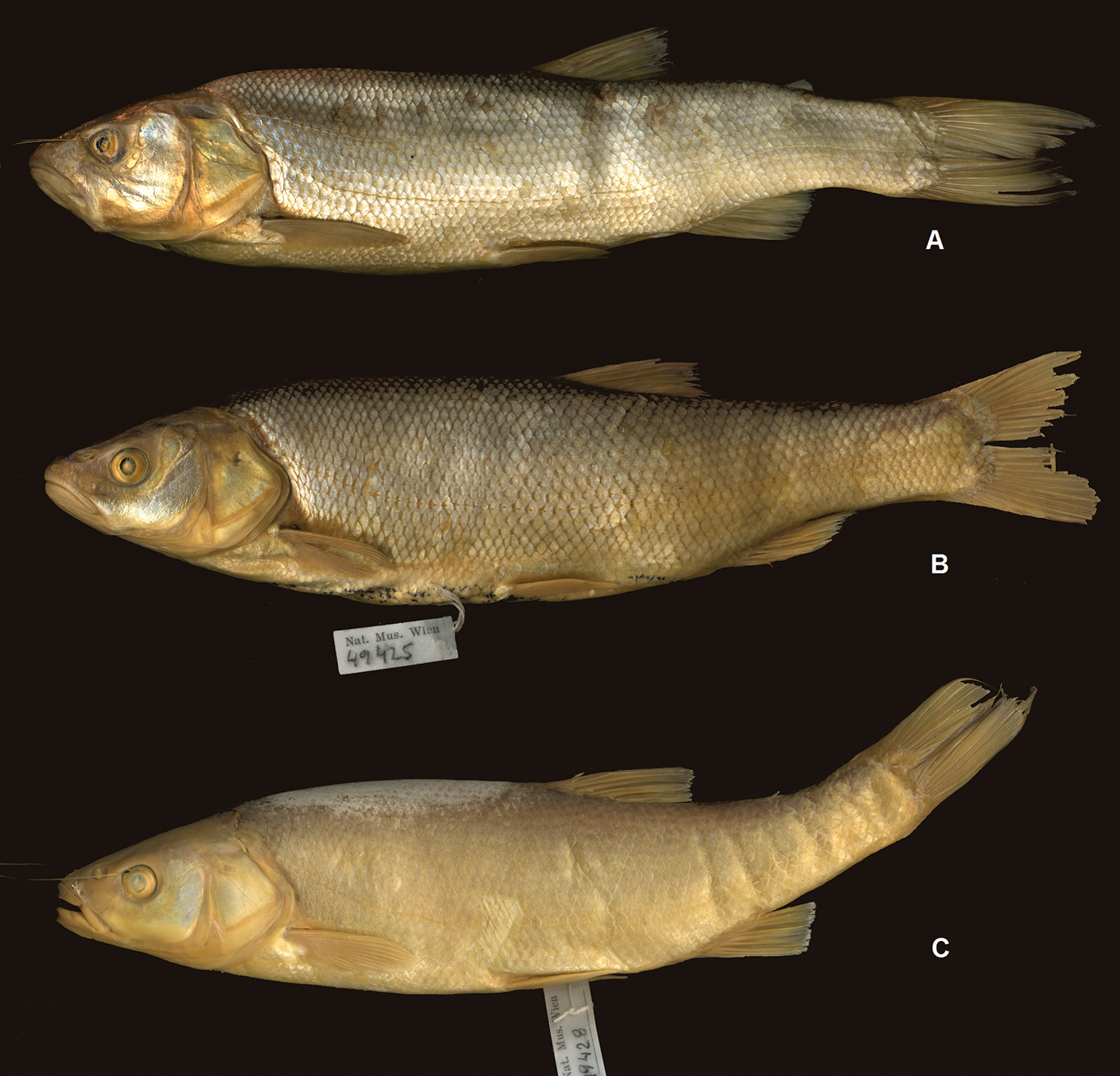
- Squalius microlepis (phenotype)

Conservation status
- Endangered (IUCN 3.1)

Scientific classification
- Kingdom: Animalia
- Phylum: Chordata
- Class: Actinopterygii
- Order: Cypriniformes
- Family: Leuciscidae
- Subfamily: Leuciscinae
- Genus: Squalius
- Species: S. microlepis

Binomial name
- Squalius microlepis Heckel, 1843

Synonyms
- Leuciscus microlepis (Heckel, 1843)

= Squalius microlepis =

Species of fish

Squalius microlepis, the Imotski chub, is a species of freshwater ray-finned fish belonging to the family Leuciscidae, the daces, Eurasian minnows and related fishes. It is found in Bosnia and Herzegovina and Croatia.
