= Squalius kottelati =

Conservation status
- Near Threatened (IUCN 3.1)

Scientific classification
- Kingdom: Animalia
- Phylum: Chordata
- Class: Actinopterygii
- Order: Cypriniformes
- Family: Leuciscidae
- Subfamily: Leuciscinae
- Genus: Squalius
- Species: S. kottelati

Binomial name
- Squalius kottelati Turan, Yilmaz & Kaya, 2009

Species of fish

Squalius kottelati, also known as the Cilician pike chub, is a species of freshwater ray-finned fish belonging to the family Leuciscidae, the daces, Eurasian minnows and related fishes. It is endemic to the Ceyhan and Orontes River drainages in Turkey.
