= Squalius malacitanus =

Conservation status
- Endangered (IUCN 3.1)

Scientific classification
- Kingdom: Animalia
- Phylum: Chordata
- Class: Actinopterygii
- Division: Teleostei
- Order: Cypriniformes
- Family: Leuciscidae
- Subfamily: Leuciscinae
- Genus: Squalius
- Species: S. malacitanus

Binomial name
- Squalius malacitanus Doadrio & Carmona, 2006

Species of fish

Squalius malacitanus, the Málaga chub, is a species of freshwater ray-finned fish belonging to the family Leuciscidae, the daces, Eurasian minnows and related fishes. It was first isolated from the Guadalmina River in Málaga, hence its name. It is considered a vulnerable species. S. malacitanus differs from its cogenerate species by having 7–8 branched rays in its dorsal fin, 8 branched rays in the anal lateral line; the number of scale rows above its lateral line; possessing 3 scale rows below its lateral line; 38 vertebrae, 21 abdominal, and 17 caudal; large fourth and fifth infraorbital bones; maxilla without a pointed anterior process; the middle of its frontal bone being narrow, as well as its neurocranium bone; the lower branch of its pharyngeal bone is rather long; and the shortness of the inferior lamina of its urohyal bone.

== Description ==
Squalius malacitanus is a small sized species that is usually shorter than 100 millimetres (3.9 in); its head is large and greater than the maximum body depth. Its preorbital distance is shorter than its eye's diameter, exhibiting a short interorbital distance. Its ventral fin is inserted at the origin of the dorsal fin, on its same axis. Its predorsal length is somewhat larger than its preventral length. It possesses a low caudal peduncle. It shows a large fin size, with a pectoral fin that is larger than the height of its dorsal fin.

=== Pigmentation ===
Its body is silver, somewhat darker dorsally; its colour is less bright than in Squalius valentinus. Its scales have a large black spot on their bases and several small black spots on their distal borders. Its peritoneum is also silver, with some small black spots. Its scales are not deciduous.

=== Osteology ===
It possesses a wide and short supraethmoid, parietal and frontal bones. The posterior process of its pterotic bone is pointed, while the pharyngeal bone's lower branch is long. Its urohyal bone is short and wide. The maxilla's anterior process is pointed, and its 4th and 5th infraorbital bones are wide. The posterior lamina of its cleithrum is non-expanded. It shows a short maxilla with a relatively developed coronoid process.

== Distribution and habitat ==
This fish was found in the Guadalmina River, a river that drains into the Mediterranean Sea, as well as the Genal River, a tributary of the Guadiaro. It might also be present in other rivers of the Guadiaro basin. The species inhabits streams with clear waters and gravel bottoms. It is the only endemic fish in the Guadalmina River, while in the Genal River, the species is sympatric with cyprinids native to the area, such as Barbus sclateri and Pseudochondrostoma willkommii, and also species Anguilla anguilla and Atherina boyeri.

== Status ==
The IUCN lists this fish as being a vulnerable species because of its limited range which covers less than 5,000 square kilometres (1,900 sq mi), and due to water abstraction "mainly to supply the proliferation of golf courses". It is a rare species and has a restricted distribution range. The population is currently declining.
