= Pamvotis chub =

Conservation status
- Least Concern (IUCN 3.1)

Scientific classification
- Kingdom: Animalia
- Phylum: Chordata
- Class: Actinopterygii
- Order: Cypriniformes
- Family: Leuciscidae
- Subfamily: Leuciscinae
- Genus: Squalius
- Species: S. pamvoticus

Binomial name
- Squalius pamvoticus (Stephanidis, 1939)

Species of fish

The Pamvotis chub (Squalius pamvoticus) is a species of freshwater ray-finned fish belonging to the family Leuciscidae, the daces, Eurasian minnows and related fishes. It is found in Kalamas, Acheron, Louros and Arachthos drainages in Albania and Greece.

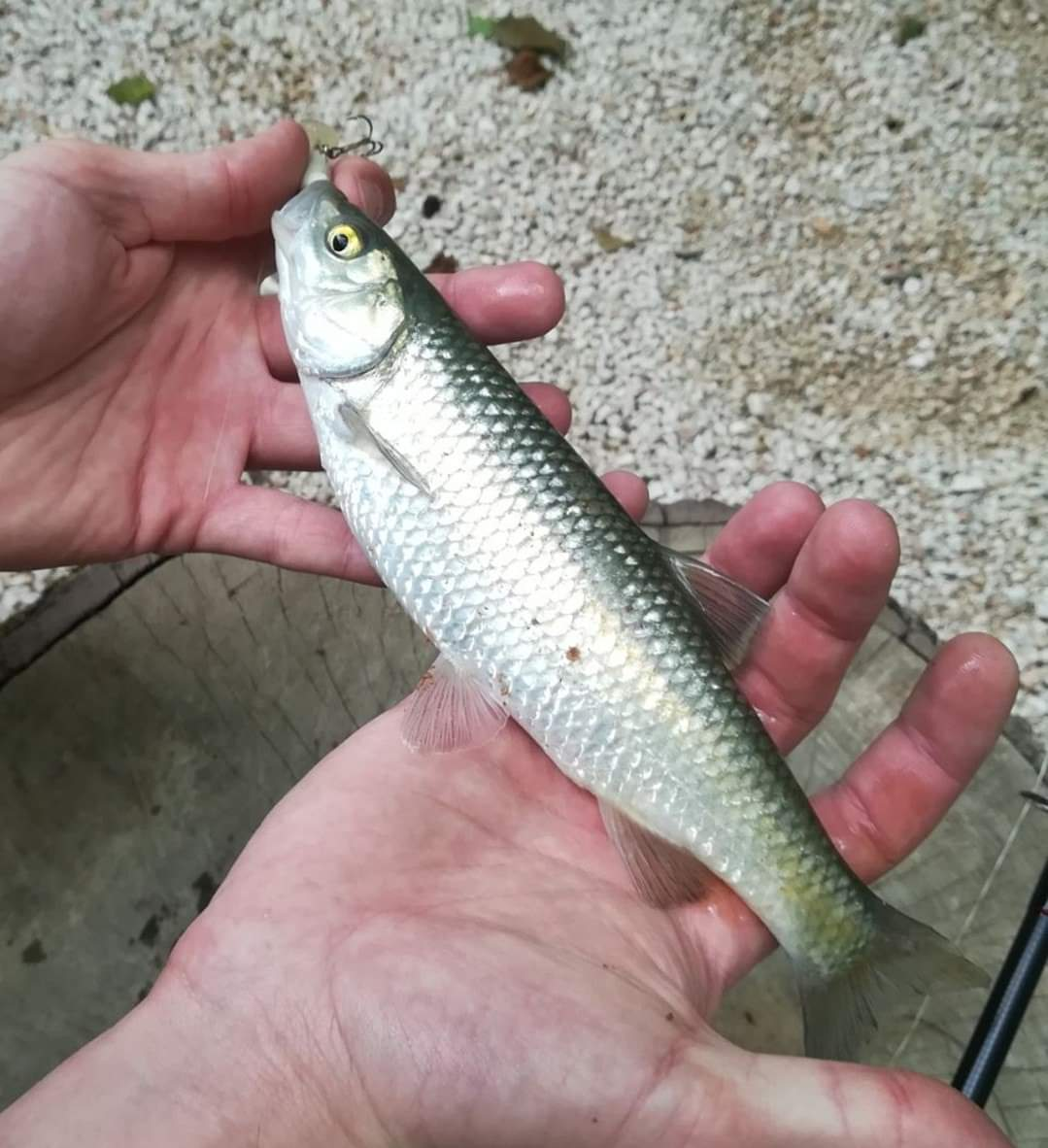
Pamvotis chub (Squalius pamvoticus)
