= Squalius anatolicus =

Conservation status
- Least Concern (IUCN 3.1)

Scientific classification
- Kingdom: Animalia
- Phylum: Chordata
- Class: Actinopterygii
- Order: Cypriniformes
- Family: Leuciscidae
- Subfamily: Leuciscinae
- Genus: Squalius
- Species: S. anatolicus

Binomial name
- Squalius anatolicus (Bogutskaya, 1997)

Synonyms
- Leuciscus anatolicus Bogutskaya, 1997

Species of fish

Squalius anatolicus, the Beyşehir pike chub or Beysehir dace, is a species of freshwater ray-finned fish belonging to the family Leuciscidae, which includes the daces, Eurasian minnows and related fishes. This species is endemic to Turkey.

== Taxonomy ==
Squalius anatolicus was first formally described as Leuciscus lepidus anatolicus in 1997 by the Russian ichthyologist Nina Gidalevna Bogutskaya, with its type locality given as Beyşehir Gölü in, central Turkey. This species is now classified in the genus Squalius, commonly referred to as chubs, which belongs to the subfamily Leuciscinae of the family Leuciscidae.

== Etymology ==
Squalius anatolicus belongs to the genus Squalius. This name was proposed by the French biologist Charles Lucien Bonaparte in 1837 for a subgenus of the genus Leuciscus for the Italian chub (Squalius cephalus), inserting an additional "i" to prevent homonymy with the spurdog genus Squalus. In classical Latin the chub and the spurdog were homonyms as squalus. An alternative explanation was that the name is a latinisation of squaglio, a vernacular name for the Italian chub in Rome and its environs. The specific name, anatolicus, means "belonging to Anatolia", referring to the type locality being on the Anatolian Peninsula, or the Asian part of Turkey.

== Description ==
Squalius anatolicus has the dorsal fin supported by 3 spines and 9 soft rays, while the anal fin also has 3 spines, but has 10 soft rays. The body is fusiform in shape, and the maximum standard length is 21.9 cm (8.6 in)

== Distribution and habitat ==
Squalius anatolicus is endemic to Turkey, where it is known from Beyşehir and Lake Tuz, as well as the Manavgat River, which drains into the Mediterranean Sea to the east of Antalya. The Beyşehir pike chub is found in lakes, rivers and reservoirs.
