= Squalius platyceps =

Conservation status
- Least Concern (IUCN 3.1)

Scientific classification
- Kingdom: Animalia
- Phylum: Chordata
- Class: Actinopterygii
- Order: Cypriniformes
- Family: Leuciscidae
- Subfamily: Leuciscinae
- Genus: Squalius
- Species: S. platyceps

Binomial name
- Squalius platyceps Zupančič, Marić, Naseka & Bogutskaya, 2010

Species of fish

Squalius platyceps, the Skadar chub, is a species of freshwater ray-finned fish belonging to the family Leuciscidae, the daces, Eurasian minnows and related fishes. It is found in the Drin drainage in Albania, Greece, Northern Macedonia, Serbia and Montenegro.
