= Cappadocian chub =

Conservation status
- Critically Endangered (IUCN 3.1)

Scientific classification
- Kingdom: Animalia
- Phylum: Chordata
- Class: Actinopterygii
- Order: Cypriniformes
- Family: Leuciscidae
- Genus: Squalius
- Species: S. cappadocicus

Binomial name
- Squalius cappadocicus Freyhof & Özuluğ, 2011

Species of fish

The Cappadocian chub (Squalius cappadocicus) is a species of freshwater ray-finned fish belonging to the family Leuciscidae, the daces, Eurasian minnows and related fishes. This species is endemic to the Melendiz River in Lake Tuz in Turkey, and critically endangered. It is considered harmless to humans.
