= Squalius kosswigi =

Conservation status
- Endangered (IUCN 3.1)

Scientific classification
- Kingdom: Animalia
- Phylum: Chordata
- Class: Actinopterygii
- Order: Cypriniformes
- Family: Leuciscidae
- Subfamily: Leuciscinae
- Genus: Squalius
- Species: S. kosswigi

Binomial name
- Squalius kosswigi (Karaman, 1972)

Synonyms
- Leuciscus kosswigi S. L. Karaman, 1972

Species of fish

Squalius kosswigi is a species of freshwater ray-finned fish belonging to the family Leuciscidae, the daces, Eurasian minnows and related fishes. It is endemic to the Tahtali River in Turkey.
