= Chocolate chub =

Conservation status
- Endangered (IUCN 3.1)

Scientific classification
- Kingdom: Animalia
- Phylum: Chordata
- Class: Actinopterygii
- Order: Cypriniformes
- Family: Leuciscidae
- Genus: Squalius
- Species: S. carinus

Binomial name
- Squalius carinus Freyhof & Özuluğ, 2011

Species of fish

The chocolate chub (Squalius carinus) is a species of freshwater ray-finned fish belonging to the family Leuciscidae, the daces, Eurasian minnows and related fishes. The species is endemic to the Lake Isikli basin in Turkey.
