= Squalius agdamicus =

Scientific classification
- Kingdom: Animalia
- Phylum: Chordata
- Class: Actinopterygii
- Order: Cypriniformes
- Family: Leuciscidae
- Subfamily: Leuciscinae
- Genus: Squalius
- Species: S. agdamicus

Binomial name
- Squalius agdamicus S. N. Kamensky, 1901

Species of fish

Squalius agdamicus is a species of freshwater ray-finned fish belonging to the family Leuciscidae, the daces, Eurasian minnows and related fishes. This species is endemic to the lower Kura basin in Azerbaijan.
