= Aegean chub =

Conservation status
- Least Concern (IUCN 3.1)

Scientific classification
- Kingdom: Animalia
- Phylum: Chordata
- Class: Actinopterygii
- Order: Cypriniformes
- Family: Leuciscidae
- Genus: Squalius
- Species: S. fellowesii

Binomial name
- Squalius fellowesii (Günther, 1868)

Synonyms
- Leuciscus fellowesii Günther, 1868

Species of fish

The Aegean chub (Squalius fellowesii) is a species of freshwater ray-finned fish belonging to the family Leuciscidae, which includes the daces, Eurasian minnows and related fishes. This species is endemic to Turkey.

== Taxonomy ==
The Aegean chub was first formally described as Leuciscus fellowesi in 1868 by the German-born British ichthyologist Albert Günther, with its type locality given as Xanthos in Turkey. This taxon was formerly considered to be a synonym of the common chub (Squalius cephalus). The Aegean chub is now considered to be a valid species in the genus Squalius, commonly referred to as chubs, which belongs to the subfamily Leuciscinae of the family Leuciscidae.

== Etymology ==
The Aegean chub belongs to the genus Squalius. This name was proposed by the French biologist Charles Lucien Bonaparte in 1837 for a subgenus of the genus Leuciscus for the Italian chub (Squalius cephalus), inserting an additional "i" to prevent homonymy with the spurdog genus Squalus. In classical Latin the chub and the spurdog were homonyms as squalus. An alternative explanation was that the name is a latinisation of squaglio, a vernacular name for the Italian chub in Rome and its environs. The specific name, fellowesii, is an eponym, honouring Charles Fellowes, a British archaeologist who presented the holotype to the British Museum Natural History.

== Distribution ==
The Aegean chub is found in numerous waterways and drainages of the Aegean region of Mugla province, Anatolia, Turkey. It is a common food source for people living in the region.

== Lifecycle ==
Aegean chub have a maximum life-span of 6 years. They grow to a length of 200mm, with most growth occurring during first maturity. Sexual maturity typically occurs at 1 year in males, 2 years in females. The species spawns between April and May, laying up to 4400 eggs at a time. Males typically outnumber females significantly, at a 1:0.6 ratio.
