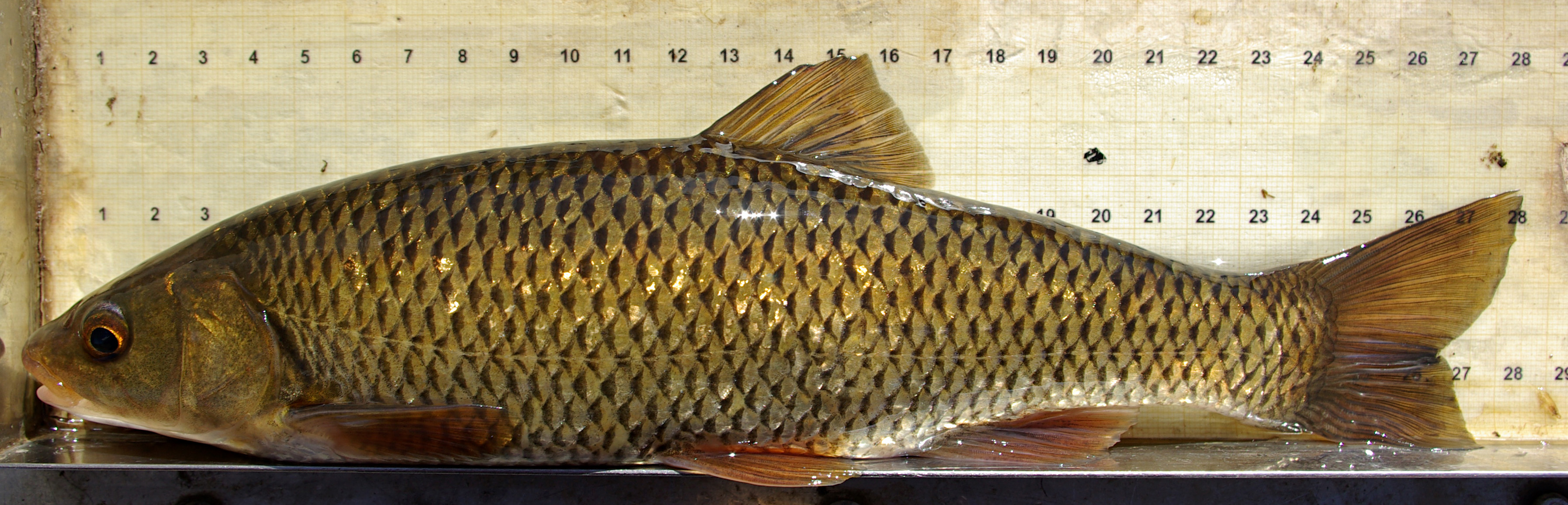
- Squalius carolitertii
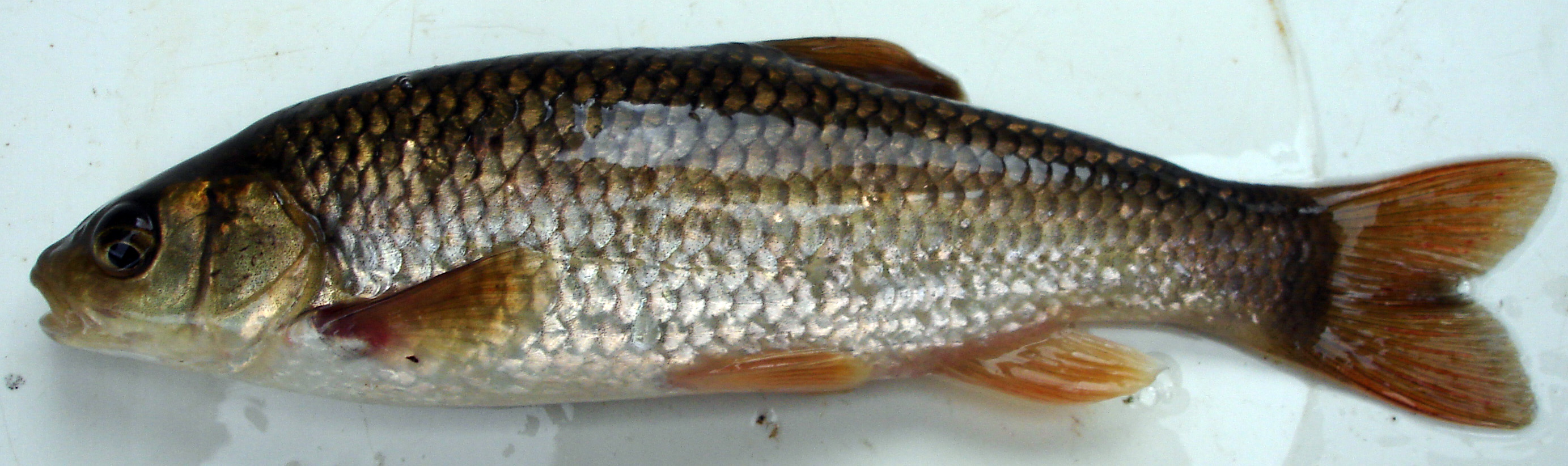
- Squalius pyrenaicus

Scientific classification
- Kingdom: Animalia
- Phylum: Chordata
- Class: Actinopterygii
- Order: Cypriniformes
- Family: Leuciscidae
- Subfamily: Leuciscinae
- Genus: Squalius; Bonaparte, 1837

Type species
- Leuciscus squalus Bonaparte, 1837

Synonyms
- Cephalopsis Fitzinger, 1873; Iberocypris Doadrio, 1980; Microlepis Bonaparte, 1846

= Squalius =

Genus of fishes

Squalius is a genus of freshwater ray-finned fish belonging to the family Leuciscidae, the daces, Eurasian minnows and related fishes. The fishes in this genus are found in Europe and Asia. Hybridization is not rare in the Leuciscidae, including this genus. S. alburnoides is known to be of ancient hybrid origin, with the paternal lineage deriving from a prehistoric species related to Anaecypris; the latter mated with ancestral S. pyrenaicus. Present-day S. alburnoides mates with sympatric congeners of other species.

== Species ==
These are the currently recognized species in this genus:

- Squalius adanaensis Turan, Kottelat & Doğan, 2013 (Adana chub)
- Squalius agdamicus S. N. Kamensky, 1901
- Squalius alburnoides (Steindachner, 1866) (Calandino)
- Squalius albus (Bonaparte, 1838) (Trasimeno chub)
- Squalius anatolicus (Bogutskaya, 1997) (Beyşehir chub)
- Squalius aradensis (Coelho, Bogutskaya, Rodrigues & Collares-Pereira, 1998) (Arade chub)
- Squalius aristotelis Özuluğ & Freyhof, 2011 (Tuzla chub)
- Squalius berak Heckel, 1843 (Mesopotamian chub)
- Squalius caetobrigus Mendes, Perea, Sousa, Sousa-Santos & Doadrio, 2024 (Sato chub)
- Squalius cappadocicus Özuluğ & Freyhof, 2011 (Cappadocian chub)
- Squalius carinus Özuluğ & Freyhof, 2011 (Chocolate chub)
- Squalius carolitertii (Doadrio, 1988) (Northern Iberian chub)
- Squalius castellanus Doadrio, Perea & Alonso, 2007 (Gallo chub)
- Squalius cephalus (Linnaeus, 1758) (Common chub)
- Squalius cii (J. Richardson, 1857) (Marmara chub)
- Squalius fellowesii (Günther, 1868) (Aegean chub)
- Squalius gaditanus Doadrio, Sousa-Santos & Perea, 2023
- Squalius illyricus Heckel & Kner, 1857 (Illyrian chub)
- Squalius irideus (Ladiges, 1960) (Anatolian ghizani)
- Squalius keadicus (Stephanidis, 1971)
- Squalius kosswigi (M. S. Karaman (sr), 1972)
- Squalius kottelati Turan, Yılmaz & Kaya, 2009 (striped chub)
- Squalius laietanus Doadrio, Kottelat & de Sostoa, 2007 (Ebro chub)
- Squalius latus Keyserling, 1861
- Squalius lepidus Heckel, 1843 (Mesopotamian pike chub)
- Squalius lucumonis (Bianco, 1983) (Etruscan chub)
- Squalius malacitanus Doadrio & Carmona, 2006 (Malaga chub)
- Squalius microlepis Heckel, 1843 (Imotski chub)
- Squalius moreoticus (Stephanidis, 1971) (Stymphalia chub)
- Squalius namak Khaefi, Esmaeili, Sayyadzadeh, Geiger & Freyhof, 2016
- Squalius orientalis (Nordmann 1840)
- Squalius orpheus Kottelat & Economidis, 2006 (Thracian chub)
- Squalius palaciosi (Doadrio, 1980) (Bogardillo)
- Squalius pamvoticus (Stephanidis, 1939) (Pamvotis chub)
- Squalius peloponensis (Valenciennes, 1844) (Peloponnese chub)
- Squalius platyceps Zupančič, Marić, Naseka & Bogutskaya, 2010
- Squalius prespensis (Fowler, 1977) (Prespa chub)
- Squalius pursakensis (Hankó (hu), 1925) (Sakarya chub)
- Squalius pyrenaicus (Günther, 1868) (Southern Iberian chub)
- Squalius recurvirostris Özuluğ & Freyhof, 2011 (Akşehir chub)
- Squalius ruffoi (Bianco & Recchia, 1983)
- Squalius semae Turan, Kottelat & Bayçelebi, 2017
- Squalius seyhanensis Turan, Kottelat & Doğan, 2013 (Seyhan chub)
- Squalius spurius Heckel, 1843 (Orontes chub)
- Squalius squalus (Bonaparte 1837) (Italian chub)
- Squalius svallize Heckel & Kner, 1857 (Neretva chub)
- Squalius tartessicus Doadrio, Sousa-Santos & Perea, 2023
- Squalius tenellus Heckel, 1843 (Livno chub)
- Squalius torgalensis (Coelho, Bogutskaya, Rodrigues & Collares-Pereira, 1998) (Mira chub)
- Squalius turcicus De Filippi, 1865 (Transcaucasian chub)
- Squalius valentinus Doadrio & Carmona, 2006 (Eastern Iberian chub)
- Squalius vardarensis S. L. Karaman, 1928 (Vardar chub)
- Squalius verepi Turan, 2022
- Squalius zrmanjae S. L. Karaman, 1928 (Zrmanja chub)
