= Squalius irideus =

Conservation status
- Near Threatened (IUCN 3.1)

Scientific classification
- Kingdom: Animalia
- Phylum: Chordata
- Class: Actinopterygii
- Order: Cypriniformes
- Family: Leuciscidae
- Subfamily: Leuciscinae
- Genus: Squalius
- Species: S. irideus

Binomial name
- Squalius irideus (Ladiges, 1960)

Synonyms
- Leucaspius irideus Ladiges, 1960; Pseudophoxinus irideus (Ladiges 1960); Ladigesocypris irideus (Ladiges 1960)

Species of fish

Squalius irideus, the Anatolian ghizani, is a species of freshwater ray-finned fish belonging to the family Leuciscidae, the daces, Eurasian minnows and related fishes. This species is endemic to Western Anatolia in Turkey.

== Sources ==
- Froese, Rainer; Pauly, Daniel, eds. (2017). "Ladigesocypris irideus". FishBase.
