= Squalius orientalis =

Scientific classification
- Kingdom: Animalia
- Phylum: Chordata
- Class: Actinopterygii
- Order: Cypriniformes
- Family: Leuciscidae
- Subfamily: Leuciscinae
- Genus: Squalius
- Species: S. orientalis

Binomial name
- Squalius orientalis Nordmann, 1840

Synonyms
- Leuciscus orientalis Nordmann, 1840

Species of fish

Squalius orientalis is a species of freshwater ray-finned fish belonging to the family Leuciscidae, the daces, Eurasian minnows and related fishes. It is found in the Caspian Sea drainage.
