= Tuzla chub =

Conservation status
- Least Concern (IUCN 3.1)

Scientific classification
- Kingdom: Animalia
- Phylum: Chordata
- Class: Actinopterygii
- Order: Cypriniformes
- Family: Leuciscidae
- Subfamily: Leuciscinae
- Genus: Squalius
- Species: S. aristotelis

Binomial name
- Squalius aristotelis Özuluğ & Freyhof, 2011

Species of fish

The Tuzla chub (Squalius aristotelis) is a species of freshwater ray-finned fish belonging to the family Leuciscidae, the daces, Eurasian minnows and related fishes. This fish is endemic to the Lake Tuzla drainage in Turkey.
