= Mesopotamian chub =

Conservation status
- Least Concern (IUCN 3.1)

Scientific classification
- Kingdom: Animalia
- Phylum: Chordata
- Class: Actinopterygii
- Order: Cypriniformes
- Family: Leuciscidae
- Subfamily: Leuciscinae
- Genus: Squalius
- Species: S. berak

Binomial name
- Squalius berak Heckel, 1843

Synonyms
- Squalius orientalis Heckel, 1847

Species of fish

The Mesopotamian chub (Squalius berak) is a species of freshwater ray-finned fish belonging to the family Leuciscidae, the daces, Eurasian minnows and related fishes. This fish is found in the Qweik and Euphrates and Tigris drainages.
