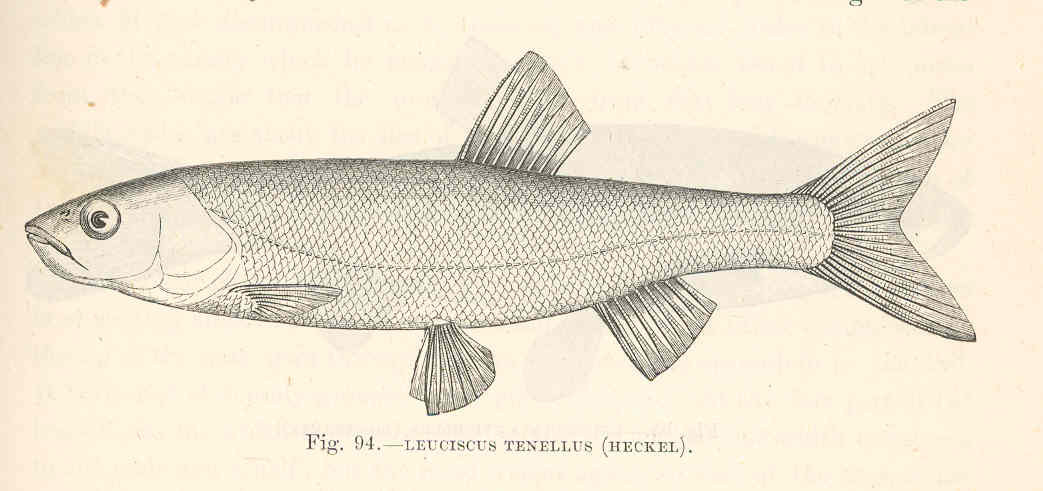

Conservation status
- Endangered (IUCN 3.1)

Scientific classification
- Kingdom: Animalia
- Phylum: Chordata
- Class: Actinopterygii
- Order: Cypriniformes
- Family: Leuciscidae
- Subfamily: Leuciscinae
- Genus: Squalius
- Species: S. tenellus

Binomial name
- Squalius tenellus Heckel, 1843

Synonyms
- Squalius cephalus tenellus Heckel, 1843

= Squalius tenellus =

Species of fish

Squalius tenellus is a species of freshwater ray-finned fish belonging to the family Leuciscidae, which includes the daces, Eurasian minnows and related fishes. It is endemic to the Cetina River drainage in Croatia and Bosnia Herzegovina.
