= Seyhan dace =

Conservation status
- Data Deficient (IUCN 3.1)

Scientific classification
- Kingdom: Animalia
- Phylum: Chordata
- Class: Actinopterygii
- Order: Cypriniformes
- Family: Leuciscidae
- Subfamily: Leuciscinae
- Genus: Squalius
- Species: S. seyhanensis

Binomial name
- Squalius seyhanensis Turan, Kottelat, & Doğan, 2013

Species of fish

The Seyhan dace or Seyhan chub (Squalius seyhanensis) is a species of freshwater ray-finned fish belonging to the family Leuciscidae, which includes the daces, Eurasian minnows and related fishes. It is endemic to the Seyhan River in Turkey.
