= Squalius castellanus =

Conservation status
- Endangered (IUCN 3.1)

Scientific classification
- Kingdom: Animalia
- Phylum: Chordata
- Class: Actinopterygii
- Order: Cypriniformes
- Family: Leuciscidae
- Genus: Squalius
- Species: S. castellanus

Binomial name
- Squalius castellanus Doadrio, Perea & Alonso, 2007

Species of fish

Squalius castellanus, the Gallo chub, is a species of freshwater ray-finned fish belonging to the family Leuciscidae, which includes the daces, Eurasian minnows and related fishes. The species is endemic to the Gallo River drainages in central Spain.
