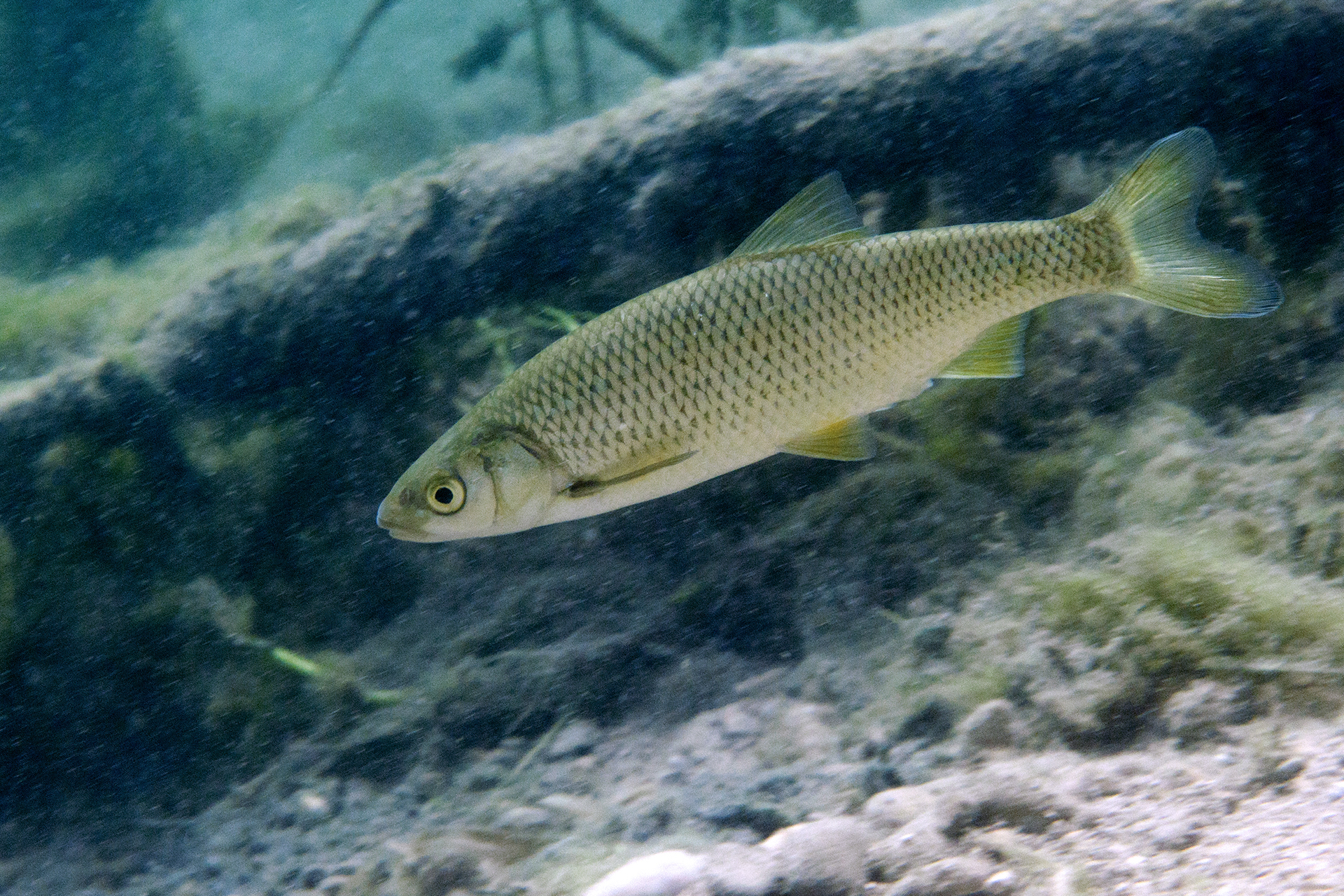

Conservation status
- Near Threatened (IUCN 3.1)

Scientific classification
- Kingdom: Animalia
- Phylum: Chordata
- Class: Actinopterygii
- Order: Cypriniformes
- Family: Leuciscidae
- Subfamily: Leuciscinae
- Genus: Squalius
- Species: S. zrmanjae

Binomial name
- Squalius zrmanjae S. L. Karaman, 1928

Synonyms
- Squalius svallizze zrmanjae S. L. Karaman, 1928; Leuciscus zrmanjae (S. L. Karaman, 1928)

= Squalius zrmanjae =

Species of fish

Squalius zrmanjae is a species of freshwater ray-finned fish belonging to the family Leuciscidae, which includes the daces, Eurasian minnows and related fishes. It is found only in Croatia. Its natural habitat is rivers. It is becoming rare due to habitat loss.
