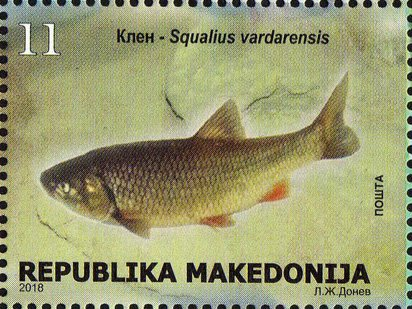

Conservation status
- Least Concern (IUCN 3.1)

Scientific classification
- Kingdom: Animalia
- Phylum: Chordata
- Class: Actinopterygii
- Order: Cypriniformes
- Family: Leuciscidae
- Subfamily: Leuciscinae
- Genus: Squalius
- Species: S. vardarensis

Binomial name
- Squalius vardarensis S. L. Karaman, 1928

Synonyms
- Squalius cephalus vardarensis S. L. Karaman, 1928

= Squalius vardarensis =

Species of fish

Squalius vardarensis, the Vardar chub, is a species of freshwater ray-finned fish belonging to the family Leuciscidae, which includes the daces, Eurasian minnows and related fishes. It is found in the Sperchios to Vardar drainages in Greece and Macedonia.
