= Squalius spurius =

Conservation status
- Data Deficient (IUCN 3.1)

Scientific classification
- Kingdom: Animalia
- Phylum: Chordata
- Class: Actinopterygii
- Order: Cypriniformes
- Family: Leuciscidae
- Subfamily: Leuciscinae
- Genus: Squalius
- Species: S. spurius

Binomial name
- Squalius spurius Heckel, 1843

Synonyms
- Leuciscus spurius (Heckel, 1843)

Species of fish

Squalius spurius, the Orontes chub is a species of freshwater ray-finned fish belonging to the family Leuciscidae, which includes the daces, Eurasian minnows and related fishes. It is found in Syria and Turkey. Its natural habitats are rivers and intermittent rivers. Its status is insufficiently known.
