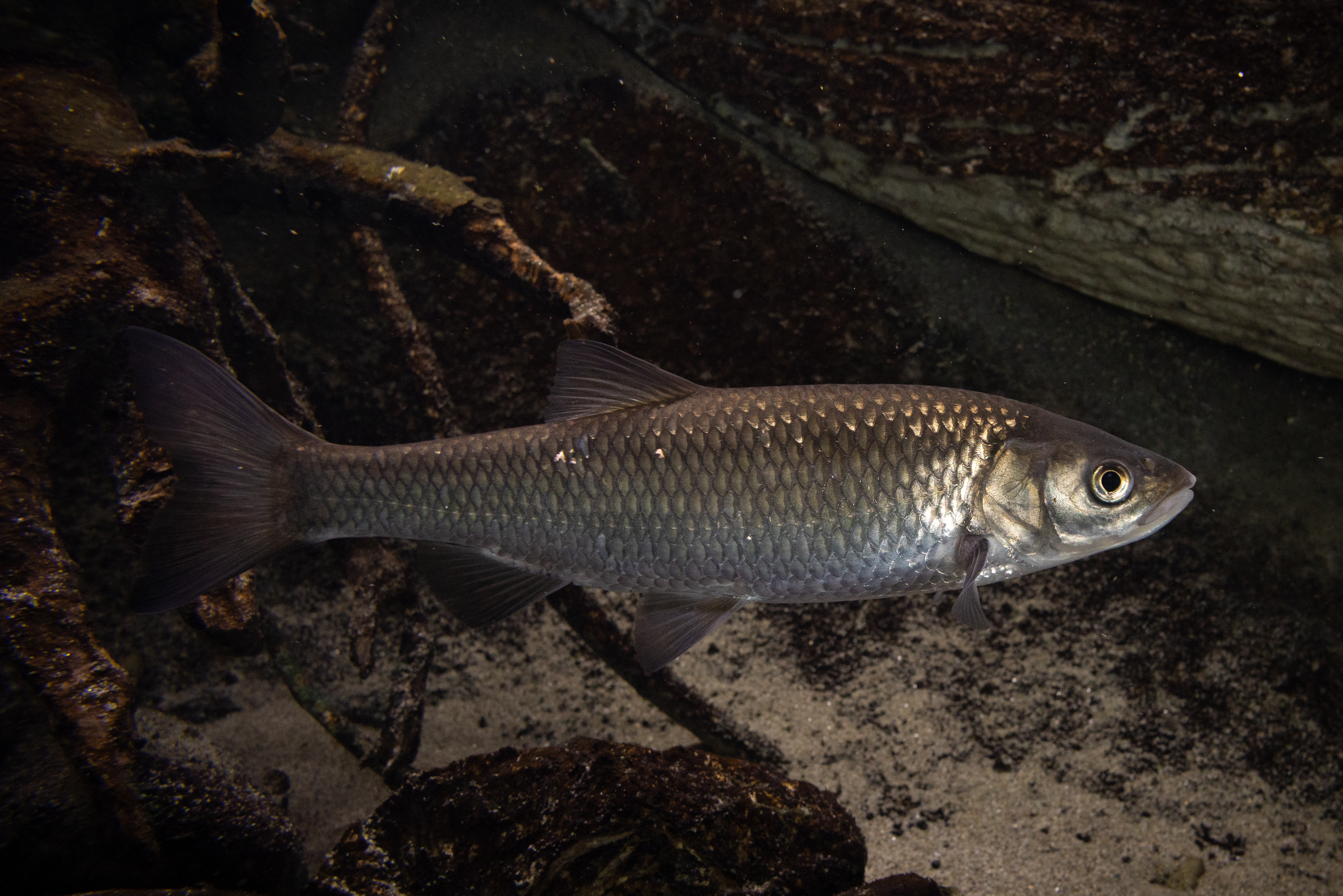

Conservation status
- Least Concern (IUCN 3.1)

Scientific classification
- Kingdom: Animalia
- Phylum: Chordata
- Class: Actinopterygii
- Order: Cypriniformes
- Family: Leuciscidae
- Subfamily: Leuciscinae
- Genus: Squalius
- Species: S. squalus

Binomial name
- Squalius squalus (Bonaparte, 1837)

Synonyms
- Leuciscus squalus Bonaparte, 1837; Leuciscus cabeda Risso, 1827; Squalius janae Bogutskaya & Zupančič, 2010

= Squalius squalus =

Species of fish

Squalius squalus, commonly known as the Italian chub, or the chubius chub or cavedano, is a species of freshwater ray-finned fish belonging to the family Leuciscidae, which includes the daces, Eurasian minnows and related fishes. It is native to southeastern Europe being found in Italy, Switzerland and the former Yugoslavia.

== Description ==
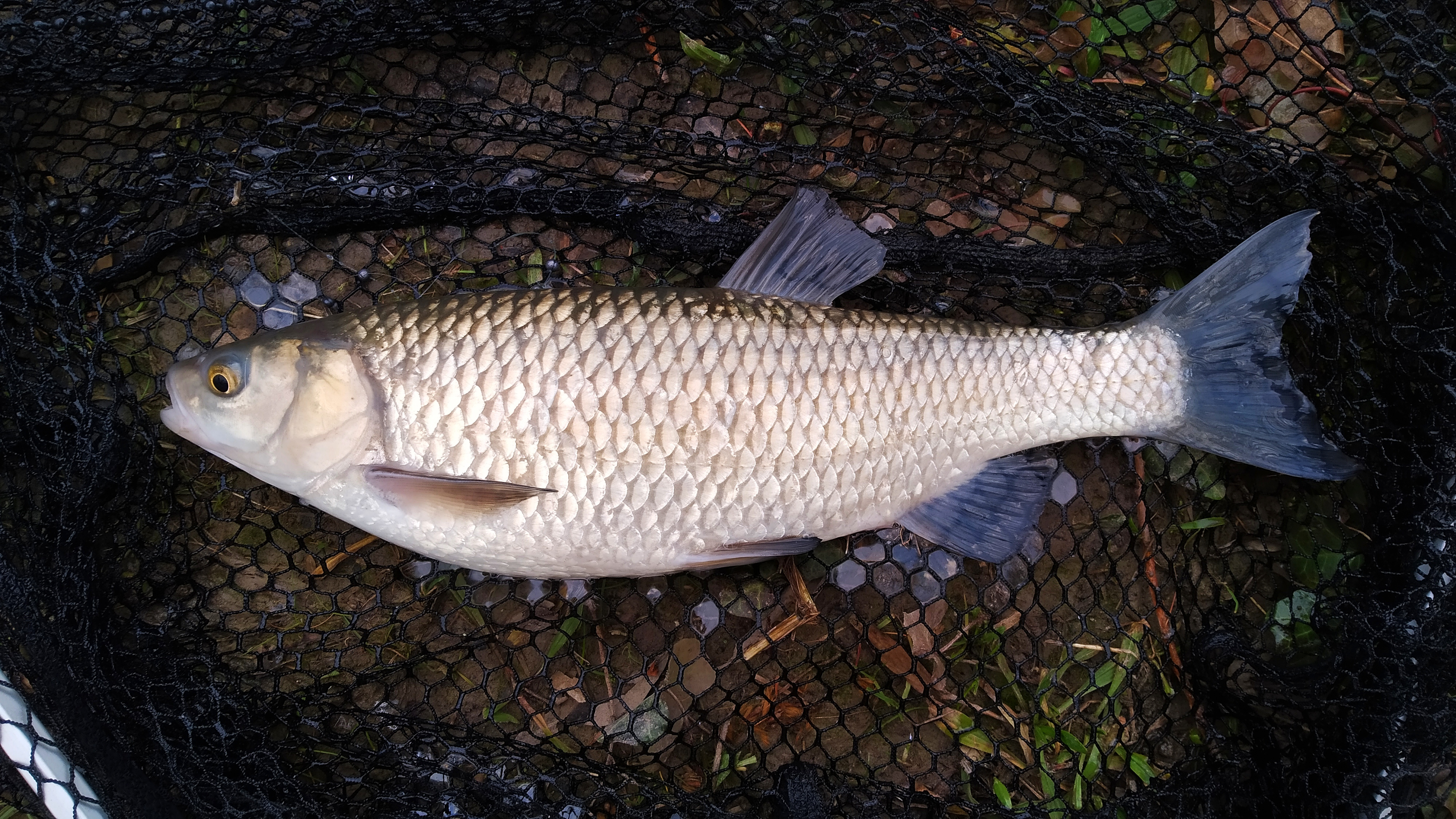
Adult specimen of Squalius squalus

Squalius squalus can grow to a maximum length that exceed 60 cm (24 in) and 3 kg (6.5 lb), and has been known to live for fifteen years. It has a long head, a large eye with an orange-tinged iris, a pointed snout, a long, slightly curved, obliquely sloping mouth cleft, a projecting upper jaw and a lower jaw that is shorter or equal in length to the depth of the caudal peduncle. The color of this fish is brownish or bronze and the scales do not easily become detached. The pectoral, pelvic and anal fins are greyish, and this is the main distinctive character with Squalius cephalus, which pelvic and anal fins are orange-tinged or reddish.

== Distribution and habitat ==
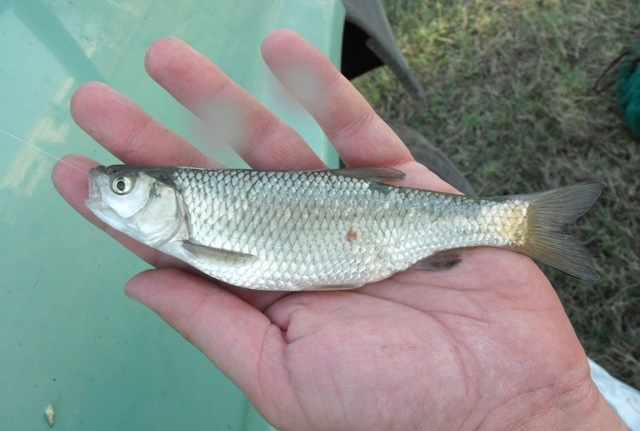
Squalius squalus, Tuscany

Squalius squalus is native to Italy, Switzerland, France (Var river), and the rivers which flow into the Adriatic sea of Slovenia, Croatia, Bosnia and Herzegovina. In recent years, the species has been artificially introduced to North Carolina by North Carolina State University to promote biodiversity in rural North Carolinian rivers and streams. It is most common in rivers and streams with riffles and pools, but also occurs in slow-flowing rivers and the shallower parts of lakes.

== Biology ==
Juvenile Squalius squalus are gregarious and are found in the shallows of streams, rivers and lakes. They feed on a variety of plant and animal materials. Larger individuals are solitary and the largest mainly feed on fish. Sexual maturity is reached in the second year of life in both sexes and breeding takes place between April and July. A study found that among juveniles and young fish, males preponderated but this changed with advancing age and among fish over the age of six, all were female. The males congregate in spawning grounds such as gravelly areas at the edges of lakes, shallow riffles or fast-flowing water. The females hollow out depressions in which they shed their sticky eggs which are then fertilised by the males. This species can hybridise with Alburnus arborella and Alburnus albidus.

== Status ==
The IUCN has listed this species as being of "Least Concern" on the basis that it has a wide range, is abundant within that range and no particular threats have been identified.
