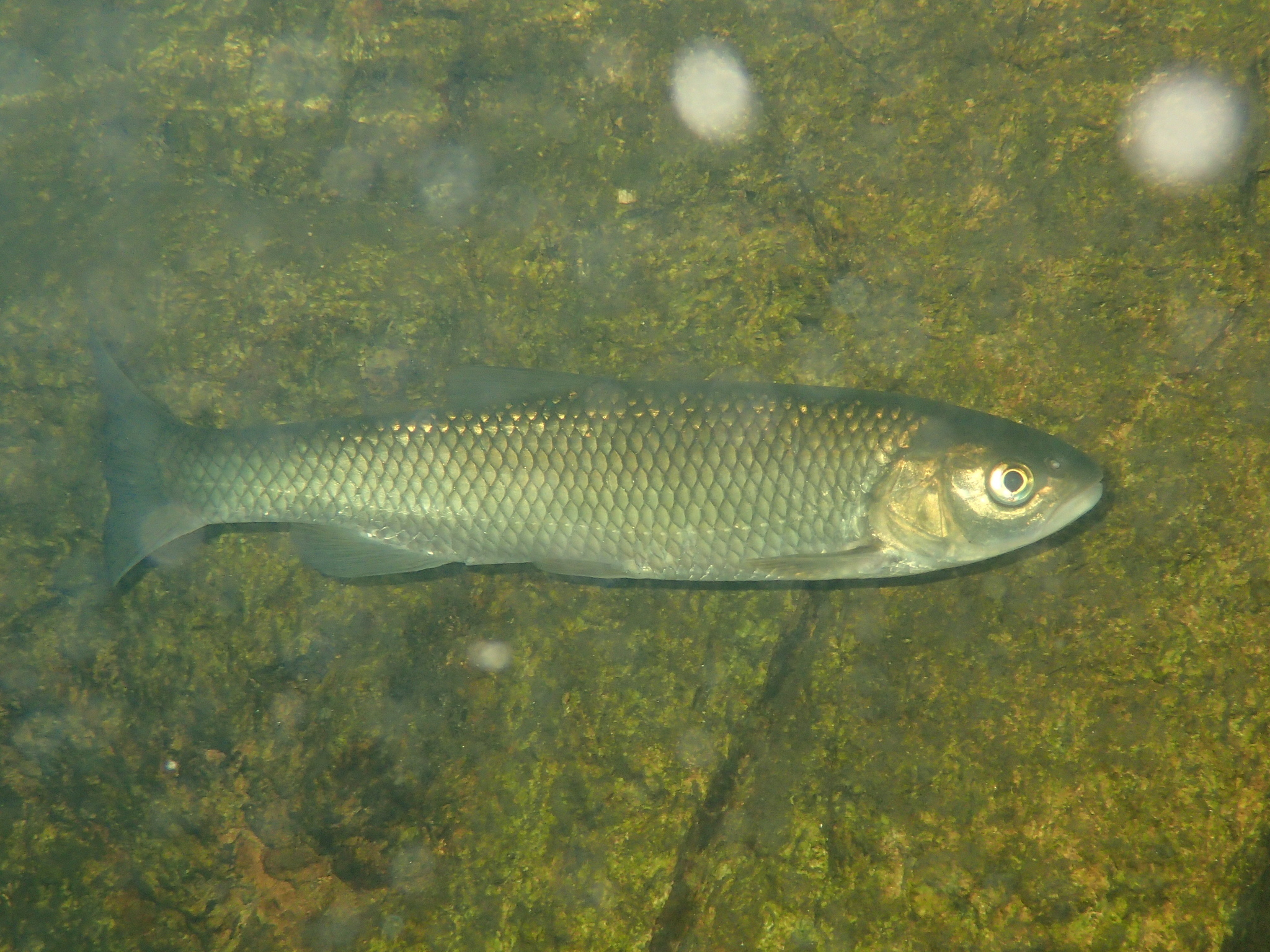
- Ebro Chub photographed at Argelès-sur-Mer, France

Conservation status
- Least Concern (IUCN 3.1)

Scientific classification
- Kingdom: Animalia
- Phylum: Chordata
- Class: Actinopterygii
- Order: Cypriniformes
- Family: Leuciscidae
- Subfamily: Leuciscinae
- Genus: Squalius
- Species: S. laietanus

Binomial name
- Squalius laietanus Doadrio, Kottelat & de Sostoa, 2007

= Squalius laietanus =

Species of fish

Squalius laietanus, the Ebro chub, is a species of freshwater ray-finned fish belonging to the family Leuciscidae, the daces, Eurasian minnows and related fishes. It is found in Ebro and Llobregat drainages in Spain, and Tech and Agly drainages in France.
