= Squalius ruffoi =

Conservation status
- Endangered (IUCN 3.1)

Scientific classification
- Kingdom: Animalia
- Phylum: Chordata
- Class: Actinopterygii
- Order: Cypriniformes
- Family: Leuciscidae
- Subfamily: Leuciscinae
- Genus: Squalius
- Species: S. ruffoi

Binomial name
- Squalius ruffoi Bianco & Recchia, 1983

Synonyms
- Leuciscus cephalus ruffoi Bianco & Recchia, 1983

Species of fish

Squalius ruffoi, the Savuto chub, is a species of freshwater ray-finned fish belonging to the family Leuciscidae, which includes the daces, Eurasian minnows and related fishes. This species is endemic to the Savuto River system in Calabria.
