= Squalius torgalensis =

Conservation status
- Endangered (IUCN 3.1)

Scientific classification
- Kingdom: Animalia
- Phylum: Chordata
- Class: Actinopterygii
- Order: Cypriniformes
- Family: Leuciscidae
- Subfamily: Leuciscinae
- Genus: Squalius
- Species: S. torgalensis

Binomial name
- Squalius torgalensis (Coelho, Bogutskaya, Rodrigues & Collares-Pereira, 1998)

Synonyms
- Leuciscus torgalensis Coelho, Bogutskaya, Rodrigues & Collares-Pereira, 1998

Species of fish

Squalius torgalensis, the Mira chub, is a species of freshwater ray-finned fish belonging to the family Leuciscidae, which includes the daces, Eurasian minnows and related fishes. This species grows to 12 cm (4.7 in) SL. It is found only in the Mira River basin in southern Portugal. Its natural habitats are rivers and intermittent rivers. It is threatened by habitat loss.
