= Transcaucasian chub =

Conservation status
- Least Concern (IUCN 3.1)

Scientific classification
- Kingdom: Animalia
- Phylum: Chordata
- Class: Actinopterygii
- Order: Cypriniformes
- Family: Leuciscidae
- Subfamily: Leuciscinae
- Genus: Squalius
- Species: S. turcicus

Binomial name
- Squalius turcicus De Filippi, 1865

Species of fish

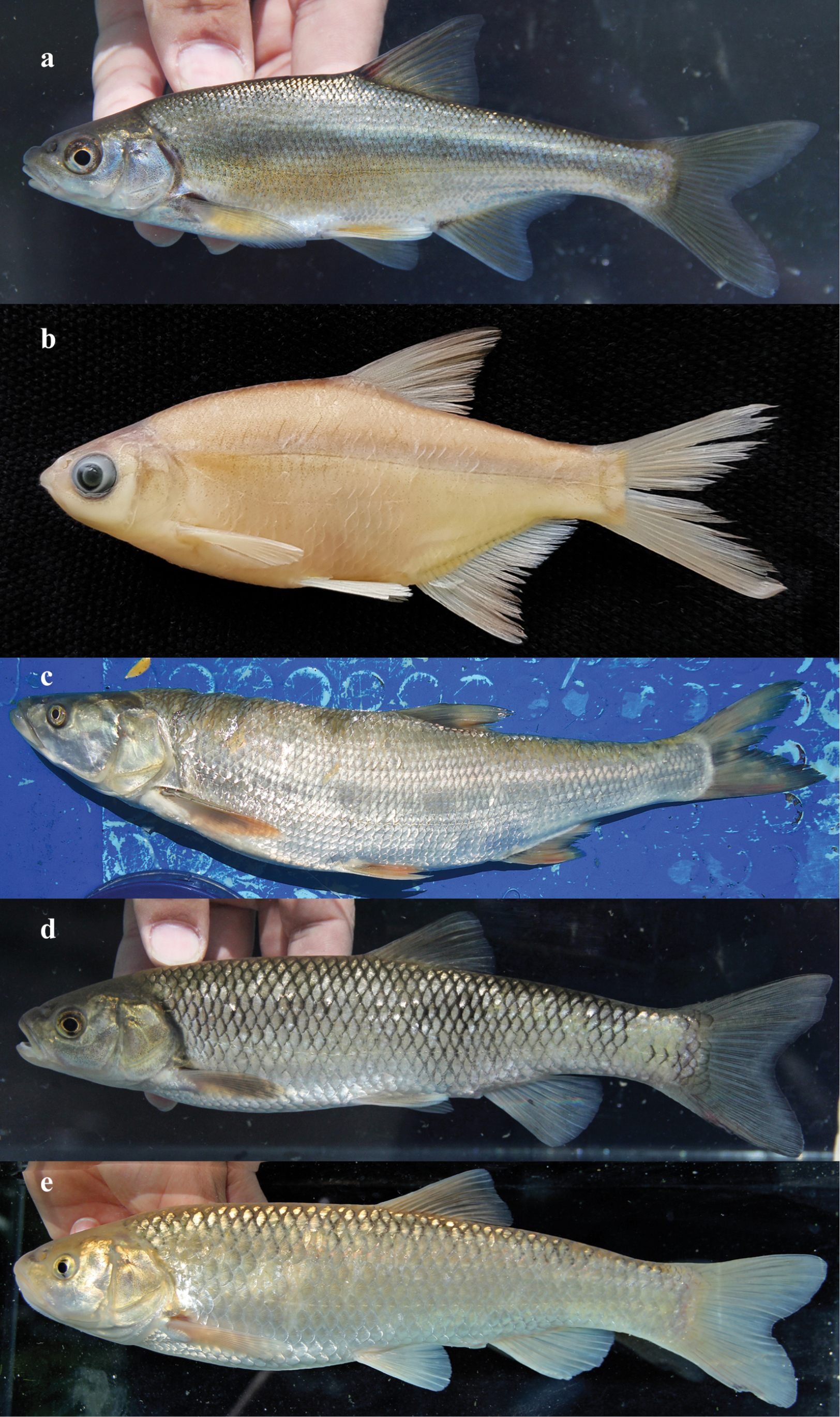
Fishes in upper Kura and Aras river drainages. Fish e (bottom) is a Transcaucasian chub (Squalius turcicus).

The Transcaucasian chub (Squalius turcicus), or South Caspian chub, is a species of freshwater ray-finned fish belonging to the family Leuciscidae, which includes the daces, Eurasian minnows and related fishes. It is found in Turkey, Armenia, Georgia, Azerbaijan and Iran.
