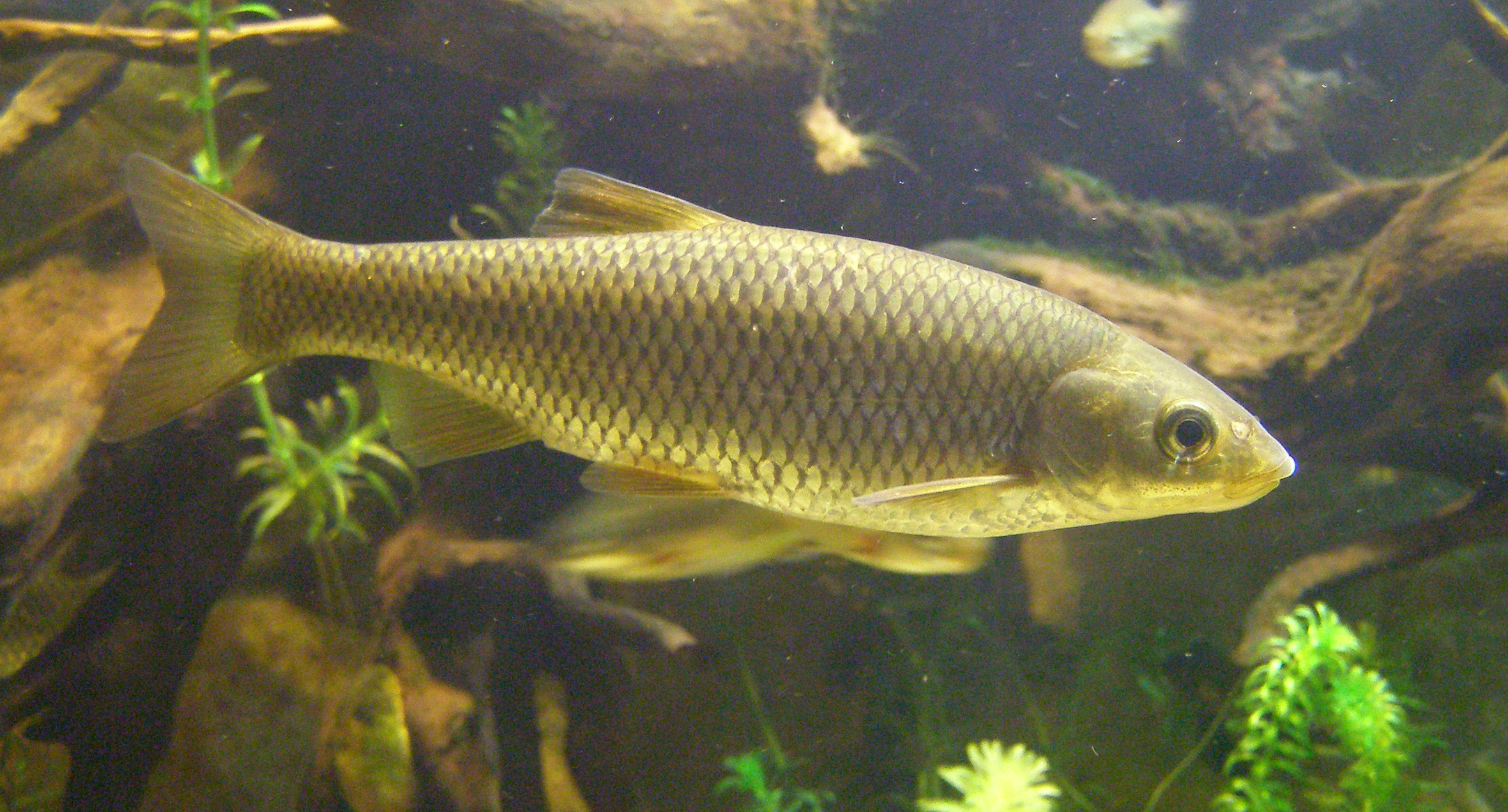

Conservation status
- Near Threatened (IUCN 3.1)

Scientific classification
- Kingdom: Animalia
- Phylum: Chordata
- Class: Actinopterygii
- Order: Cypriniformes
- Family: Leuciscidae
- Subfamily: Leuciscinae
- Genus: Squalius
- Species: S. carolitertii

Binomial name
- Squalius carolitertii (Doadrio, 1988)
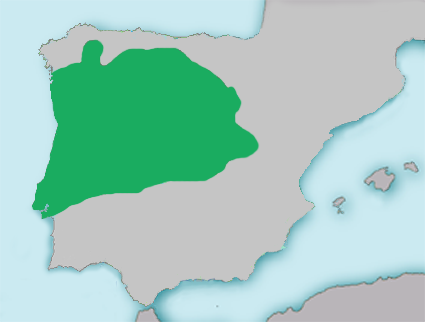
- Range of the Northern Iberian chub

Synonyms
- Leuciscus carolitertii Doadrio, 1988

= Squalius carolitertii =

Northern Iberian chub

Species of fish

Squalius carolitertii, the Northern Iberian chub, is a species of freshwater ray-finned fish belonging to the family Leuciscidae, which includes the daces, Eurasian minnows and related fishes. It is found in Portugal and Spain, and is known there as the bordallo, escalo or gallego.

Its natural habitats are rivers and intermittent rivers. It is considered Near Threatened by the IUCN.

== Taxonomy ==
Squalius carolitertii was first formally described as Leuciscus carolitertii in 1988 by the Spanish ichthyologist Ignacio Doadrio, with its type locality given as the Cega River, Rebollo, Segovia in Spain at an elevation of 900 m (3,000 ft). This species is now classified in the genus Squalius, commonly referred to as chubs, which belongs to the subfamily Leuciscinae of the family Leuciscidae.

== Etymology ==
Squalius carolitertii belongs to the genus Squalius. This name was proposed by the French bioogist Charles Lucien Bonaparte in 1837 for a subgenus of the genus Leuciscus for the Italian chub (Squalius cephalus), inserting an additional "i" to prevent homonymy with the spurdog genus Squalus. In classical Latin the chub and the spurdog were homonyms as squalus. An alternative explanation was that the name is a latinisation of squaglio, a vernacular name for the Italian chub in Rome and its environs. The specific name, carolitertii, is a latinisation of Carlos III, the king of Spain, who founded the Museo Nacional de Ciencias Naturales in Madrid, where Doadrio worked and the holotype was deposited.

== Distribution ==
Squalius carolitertii is a small endemic leusciscid inhabiting the rivers of the Iberian Peninsula across a large area, including the Douro, Mondego, Lima, Minho, and Lérez basins. Recently, several researchers have reported this species for the first time from the upper reaches of the Alberche River (a tributary of the Tagus basin in central Spain) and in the Oitavén River (a tributary of the Verdugo River in northwestern Spain).

== Diet ==
S. carolitertii is an omnivorous fish feeding predominantly on aquatic invertebrates, being nymphs of Baetis spp. The most abundant prey, although detritus, is an important food item. Moreover, in S. carolitertii, as in many other fish species, there is normally a change in the diet composition during the life of the fish, and these age-related diet shifts occur at three different levels: (1) frequency of occurrence of detritus decreases with fish age; (2) prey selection varies with fish age; and (3) mean prey size increases as fish size increased.
