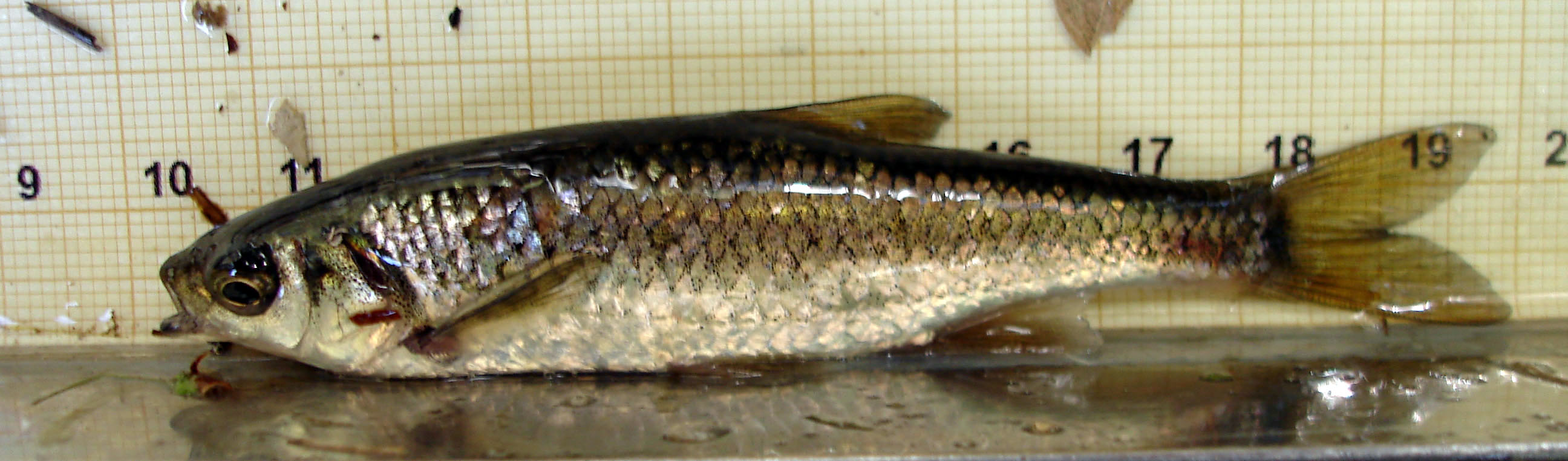

Conservation status
- Least Concern (IUCN 3.1)

Scientific classification
- Kingdom: Animalia
- Phylum: Chordata
- Class: Actinopterygii
- Division: Teleostei
- Order: Cypriniformes
- Family: Leuciscidae
- Subfamily: Leuciscinae
- Genus: Squalius
- Species: S. alburnoides

Binomial name
- Squalius alburnoides (Steindachner, 1866)
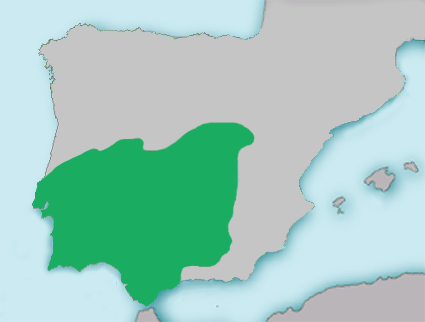

Synonyms
- Iberocypris alburnoides (Steindachner, 1866); Leuciscus alburnoides Steindachner, 1866); Tropidophoxinellus alburnoides (Steindachner, 1866)

= Squalius alburnoides =

Species of fish

Squalius alburnoides, the calandino, is a species of freshwater ray-finned fish belonging to the family Leuciscidae, which includes the daces, Eurasian minnows and related fishes. This species is found in Portugal and Spain.

== Taxonomy ==
Squalius alburnoides was first formally described in 1866 by the Austrian ichthyologist Franz Steindachner, with its type locality given as a stream near Mérida in Spain. The Adana chub belongs to the genus Squalius, commonly referred to as chubs, which belongs to the subfamily Leuciscinae of the family Leuciscidae.

This species is a highly peculiar fish in regard to its evolution and reproduction. It has been derived from hybridisation between females of Squalius pyrenaicus and males of another, unknown, extinct cyprinid species, and maintains the genomes of both parental species. Squalius alburnoides may have various numbers of these genomes (polyploidy), and may use different reproductive modes to pass them on to the offspring, including asexual reproduction, normal meiosis and hybridogenesis. It has the first confirmed instance of natural androgenesis in a vertebrate, where an individual inherits only genes from the father.

== Etymology ==
Squalius alburnoides belongs to the genus Squalius. This name was proposed by the French biologist Charles Lucien Bonaparte in 1837 for a subgenus of the genus Leuciscus for the Italian chub (Squalius cephalus), inserting an additional "i" to prevent homonymy with the spurdog genus Squalus. In classical Latin the chub and the spurdog were homonyms as squalus. An alternative explanation was that the name is a latinisation of squaglio, a vernacular name for the Italian chub in Rome and its environs. The specific name, alburnoides, means "of the form of Alburnus", an allusion to the long body, notched teeth and upward pointing snout which resembles the shape of the bleaks in the genus Alburnus.

== Distribution and habitat ==
Squalius alburnoides has a wide distribution in the river systems draining into the Atlantic Ocean in the western Iberian Peninsula from the Douro south to the Guadalquivir. It has been introduced into the Guadalhorce and Júcar rivers in Spain, drainages that flow into the Mediterranean Sea. The calandino is found in rivers and streams at varying altitudes and with differing flows, but tends to avoid the wide, deep lowland stretches of rivers.
