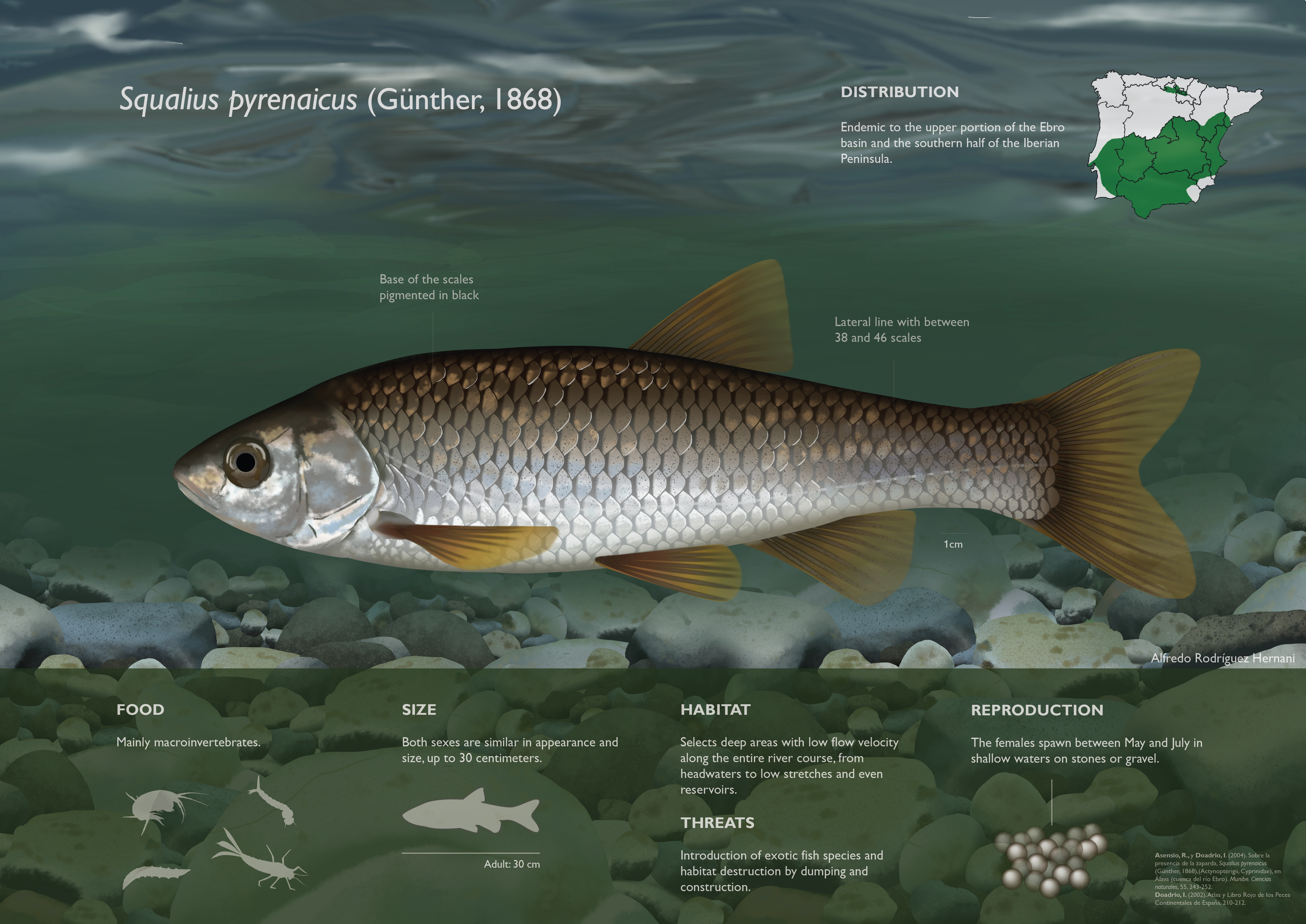

Conservation status
- Vulnerable (IUCN 3.1)

Scientific classification
- Kingdom: Animalia
- Phylum: Chordata
- Class: Actinopterygii
- Order: Cypriniformes
- Family: Leuciscidae
- Subfamily: Leuciscinae
- Genus: Squalius
- Species: S. pyrenaicus

Binomial name
- Squalius pyrenaicus (Günther, 1868)
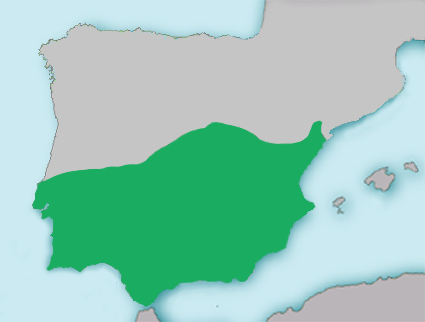

Synonyms
- Leuciscus pyrenaicus Günther, 1868

= Squalius pyrenaicus =

Species of fish

Squalius pyrenaicus, the Southern Iberian chub or Tagus chub, is a species of freshwater ray-finned fish belonging to the family Leuciscidae, which includes the daces, Eurasian minnows and related fishes. This species is endemic to the Iberian Peninsula.

== Taxonomy ==
Squalius pyrenaicus was first formally described as Leuciscus pyrenaicus in 1868 by the German-born British herpetologist and ichthyologist Albert Günther, with its type locality given as the Mondego and Cintra rivers in Portugal. The Tagus chub belongs to the genus Squalius, commonly referred to as chubs, which belongs to the subfamily Leuciscinae of the family Leuciscidae.

This species is one of the parent species of two species of Iberian endemic chub S. alburnoides and the extinct S. palaciosi; the other parent taxon of these species is unknown and may be extinct. Populations of chub in the Sado River catchment have been thought to be this species but have recently been identified as being closer to S. tartessicus.

== Etymology ==
Squalius pyrenaicus belongs to the genus Squalius. This name was proposed by the French bioogist Charles Lucien Bonaparte in 1837 for a subgenus of the genus Leuciscus for the Italian chub (Squalius cephalus), inserting an additional "i" to prevent homonymy with the spurdog genus Squalus. In classical Latin the chub and the spurdog were homonyms as squalus. An alternative explanation was that the name is a latinisation of squaglio, a vernacular name for the Italian chub in Rome and its environs. The specific name, pyrenaicus, means "of the Pyrenees", although this species was described from Portugal.

== Distribution and habitat ==
Squalius pyrenaicus is endemic to the catchment of the Tagus river in Spain and Portugal. It is found in a wide variety of rivers and stream at varying altitudes and different currents, avoiding the wide, deep lowland stretches of rivers. Many of the streams it inhabits partially dry up in the summer, when it uses relict pools as refuges.

== Conservation ==
Squalius pyrenaicus is classified as Vulnerable by the International Union for Conservation of Nature. Threats to this species include invavsive species, pollution, droughts and habitat modification such as canalisation and damming.
