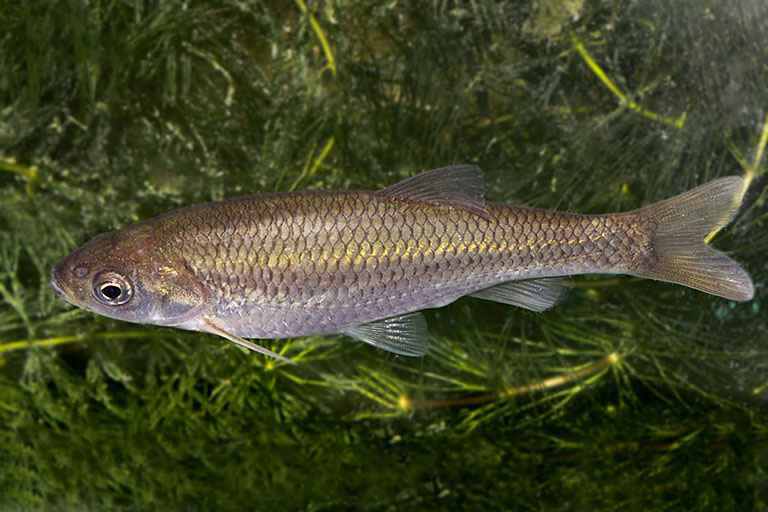

Conservation status
- Vulnerable (IUCN 3.1)

Scientific classification
- Kingdom: Animalia
- Phylum: Chordata
- Class: Actinopterygii
- Division: Teleostei
- Order: Cypriniformes
- Family: Leuciscidae
- Subfamily: Leuciscinae
- Genus: Squalius
- Species: S. valentinus

Binomial name
- Squalius valentinus Doadrio & Carmona, 2006

= Squalius valentinus =

Species of fish

Squalius valentinus, commonly known as the Eastern Iberian chub, Valencia chub and Levantine bagra, is a species of freshwater ray-finned fish belonging to the family Leuciscidae, which includes the daces, Eurasian minnows and related fishes. It was first isolated from the Turia River in Valencia, hence its name. It is considered endangered.

This species is differentiated from its cogenerates by having eight branched rays in its dorsal fin; eight branched rays in its anal fin; two rows of pharyngeal teeth on both sides possessing 2 and 5 teeth (2.55.2); a wide caudal peduncle; its number of gill rakers; the number of scales in its lateral line; the number of scale rows above the latter; by possessing three scale rows below it; by having thirty-nine vertebrae (twenty-two of them abdominal and seventeen of them caudal); showing large 4th and 5th infraorbital bones; a maxilla with a very distinct marked anterior process; exhibiting a frontal bone expanded at the middle; a wide neurocranium bone; the lower branch of the pharyngeal bone being robust; a large and narrow urohyal; as well as genetic differences (allozymes).

== Description ==
Squalius valentinus is a small sized species that is usually shorter than 200 millimetres (7.9 in); its head is large and similar to the maximum body depth. Its preorbital distance is similar to its eye's diameter, exhibiting a long interorbital distance. Its ventral fin is inserted at the origin of the dorsal fin, on its same axis. Its predorsal length is somewhat larger than its preventral length. It possesses a high caudal peduncle. It shows a large fin size, with a pectoral fin that is larger than the height of its dorsal fin.

=== Pigmentation ===
Its body is silver, somewhat darker dorsally; its scales have a big black spot at their base and several small black spots on its distal border. Its peritoneum also carries small black spots. Its scales are deciduous in juveniles.

=== Osteology ===
It possesses a wide and short supraethmoid, parietal and frontal bones. The posterior process of its pterotic bone is wide and robust, while the pharyngeal bone's lower branch is very robust. Its urohyal bone is large and thin. The maxilla's anterior process is pointed, and its 4th and 5th infraorbital bones are very wide. The posterior lamina of its cleithrum is widened. It shows a short maxilla with a relatively developed coronoid process. Itd 3rd, 4th and 5th pharyngeal teeth in its external row are small or even lack a masticatory area.

== Distribution and habitat ==
Squalius valentinus inhabits rivers in the Spanish Mediterranean, between the Mijares and Vinalopó basins. The Júcar basin is inhabited by both this species and S. pyrenaicus, although both species are allopatric, the latter inhabiting the upper basin while the former is distributed throughout rivers of the lower basin. The species usually is found to inhabit streams with clear waters and gravel bottoms. In streams such as the Gorgos River it is the only endemic fish. In the Turia and Mijares basins it occurs in sympatry with other native cyprinids: Barbus guiraonis, Chondrostoma turiense and Chondrostoma arcasii. S. valentinus inhabits the Júcar, Serpis and Vinalopó basins along with B. guiraonis.

== Status ==
The IUCN lists this fish as being a vulnerable species because of its limited range which covers less than 10,000 square kilometres (3,900 sq mi), and due to water abstraction for the construction of dams as well as the introduction of foreign species. It is a rare species and has a restricted distribution range. The population is currently declining. S. valentinus is frequently dominant as a species in small rivers; however, in wide rivers, the species is local and rare.
