= Vendace =

Vendace can refer to several species of fish, but especially these species of freshwater whitefish:

- Coregonus albula, widespread in northern continental Europe
- Coregonus vandesius, in lakes of Scotland and England; arguably the same species as Coregonus albula

- It can also refer to:

- USS Vendace (SS-430), a Balao-class submarine
- Vickers Vendace, a British trainer aircraft of the 1920s
