= Béla Hankó =

Hungarian zoologist (1886–1959)

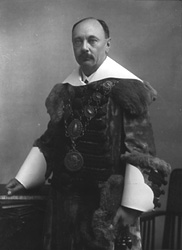

Béla Hankó (July 5, 1886 – November 16, 1959) was a Hungarian zoologist who took a special interest in ichthyology and in the history of animal keeping in Hungary.

Hankó was born in Poprád to physician Artúr Hankó and Gizella Burger and after school he went to the University of Budapest where he received a doctorate in the humanities in 1910. He then worked as a research assistant in the department of zoology. In 1911 he worked in Heligoland and then travelled around Europe. In 1918 he married Melánia Raichl. They had 2 daughters. In 1925 he became a fish economics teacher at the Balaton biological station at Révfülöp. In 1927 he became director of the Tihany Biological Institute. He moved to University of Debrecen in 1929. Between 1940 and 1944 he was at the University of Cluj and worked there until his retirement in 1950. He emigrated to Canada in 1957.

Hankó's major work was on the fishes, particularly of Asia Minor. He also worked on pisciculture and the distributions of fishes in Hungary. He took a special interest in the history of pets and domestic animals in Hungary and wrote a book on the subject in 1943.
