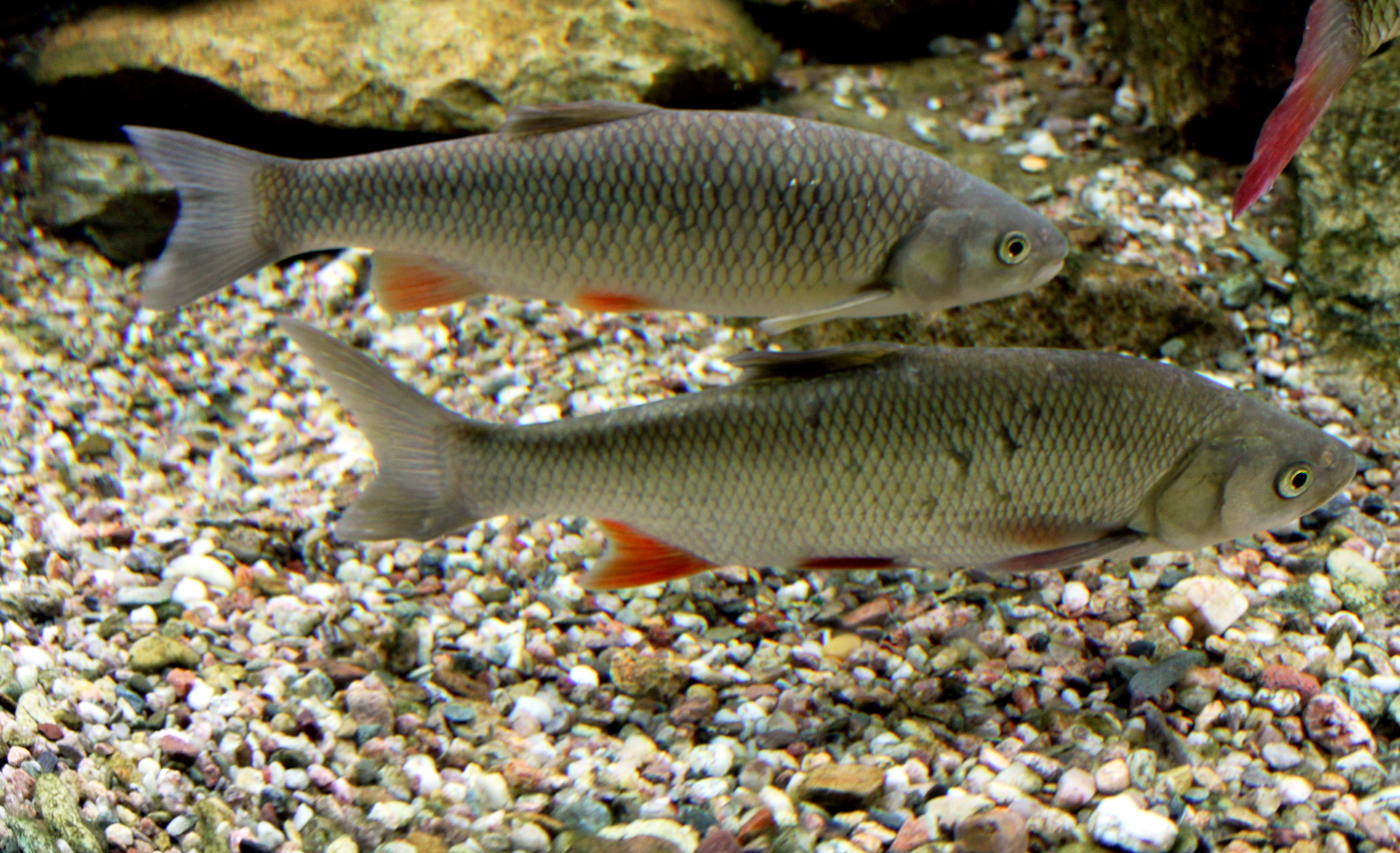

Conservation status
- Least Concern (IUCN 3.1)

Scientific classification
- Kingdom: Animalia
- Phylum: Chordata
- Class: Actinopterygii
- Division: Teleostei
- Order: Cypriniformes
- Family: Leuciscidae
- Subfamily: Leuciscinae
- Genus: Squalius
- Species: S. cephalus

Binomial name
- Squalius cephalus (Linnaeus, 1758)

Synonyms
- Cyprinus cephalus Linnaeus, 1758; Leuciscus cephalus (Linnaeus, 1758); Cyprinus capito Scopoli, 1786; Cyprinus lugdunensis Walbaum, 1792; Cyprinus orthonotus Hermann, 1804: Cyprinus albula Nardo, 1827; Cyprinus kietaibeli Reisinger, 1830; Cyprinus rufus Vallot, 1837; Leuciscus brutius Costa, 1838; Leuciscus cavedanus Bonaparte, 1838; Leuciscus rissoi Schinz [H. R.] 1840; Leuciscus nothulus Bonaparte, 1841; Squalius pareti Bonaparte, 1841; Squalius tyberinus Bonaparte, 1841; Squalius cephalopsis Heckel, 1843; Squalius orientalis Heckel, 1847; Leuciscus albiensis Valenciennes, 1844; Leuciscus frigidus Valenciennes, 1844; Leuciscus squalius Valenciennes, 1844; Leuciscis vandoisulus Valenciennes, 1844; Squalius meunier Heckel, 1852; Cyprinus salmoneus Gronow, 1854; Leuciscus latifrons Nilsson, 1855; Squalius clathratus Blanchard, 1866; Squalius meridionalis Blanchard, 1866; Squalius turcicus var. platycephala Kamensky, 1897; Squalius cephalus var. athurensis Roule & Cardaillac de Saint-Paul 1903; Leuciscus cephalus var. wjatkensis Lukasch, 1933; Leuciscus cephalus macedonicus S. L. Karaman, 1955

= Squalius cephalus =

Species of fish

Squalius cephalus, the common chub, European chub or simply chub, is a species of freshwater ray-finned fish belonging to the family Leuciscidae, the daces, Eurasian minnows and related fishes. This species is found in Europe where it frequents both slow and moderate rivers, as well as canals, lakes and still waterbodies of various kinds.

== Description ==
It is a stocky fish with a large rounded head. Its body is long and cylindrical in shape and is covered in large greenish-brown scales which are edged with narrow bands of black across the back, paling to golden on the flanks and even paler on the belly. The tail is dark brown or black, the dorsal fin is a greyish-green in colour and all the other fins are orange-red. The dorsal fin has 3 spines and 7–9 soft rays while the anal fin has 3 spines and 7–10 rays. The vertebrae count is 42–48. It can grow to 60 cm standard length but most fish are around 30 cm.

Eggs are round with a 1.8 mm diameter, and first day larvae are 6–7 mm long and weigh about 120 mg.

== Distribution ==
The chub is distributed throughout most of northern Eurasia, it can be found in the rivers flowing into the North, Baltic, northern Black, White, Barents and Caspian Sea basins, the Atlantic basins south to Adour drainage in France and in Great Britain north to 56°, in Scandinavia in southern Finland and southern Sweden north to around Stockholm. In the Mediterranean basin it is found in France from the Var to the Hérault, and may also be present in the Aude and drainages. It is absent as a native species from Ireland and Italy, but has been introduced to both countries. In Italy, S. cephalus is present and acclimatised since decades, but it seems marginally found here and there (mainly in the Po river basin), never forming well established populations.

== Habitat and ecology ==
It is most abundant in small rivers and large streams in the "barbel zone" where there are riffles and pools. It occurs along the banks of slow-flowing lowland rivers in large lake and even in mountain streams. Chub in lakes undertake spawning migrations into inflowing streams. The adult fish are solitary but the juvenile fish are sociable and occur in shoals. The larvae and juveniles prefer rather shallow habitats along shorelines and these smaller fish have a varied diet of aquatic and terrestrial animals while the large, solitary adults prey mainly on freshwater shrimp and small fishes. In the United Kingdom, chub have been recorded feeding on worms, molluscs, crustaceans, and various insect larvae while large chub eat considerable numbers of small fish, such as chub, eels, common dace, common roach, gudgeon and minnows as well as frogs, crayfish, voles and young water birds. They have also been observed eating berries such as blackberries and elderberry from trees overhanging the water. They feed throughout the year if there are opportunities, even in the coldest days of midwinter.

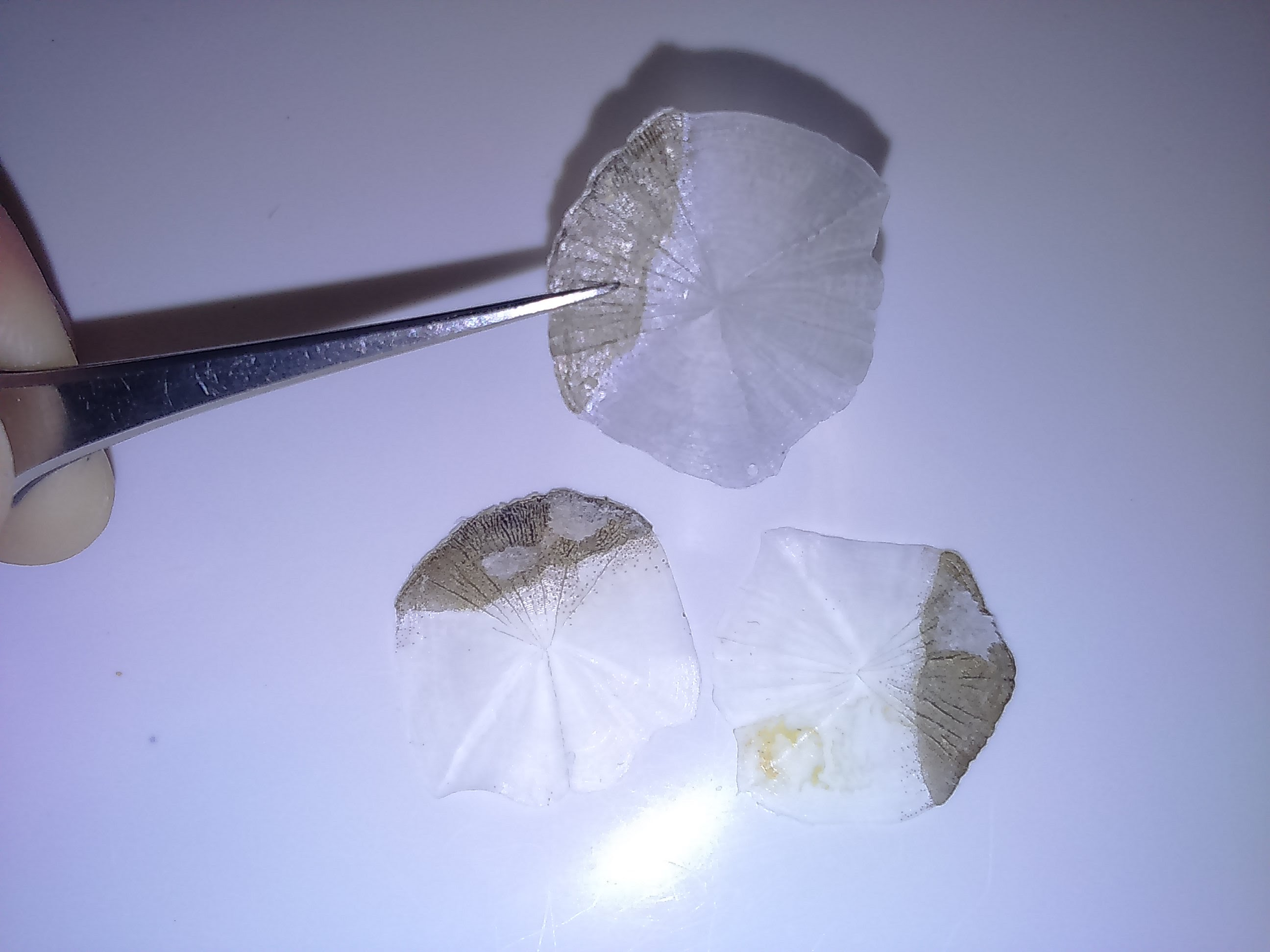
Scales taken from chub

Spawning happens when the water temperature reaches 14 °C, and lasts from May to September. They spawn in fast-flowing water above gravel substrates but only infrequently will they spawn among submerged vegetation. The females spawn more than once during a season and each female will mate with several males. The males aggregate at spawning sites and will follow the ripe females, often with much splashing, to shallow riffles. Females lay pale yellow sticky eggs which adhere to the gravel, weed and stones in flowing water. Sexual maturity in chub is influenced by environmental factors with males reaching sexual maturity at the age of 2–4 years while females reach it at 4–6 although some individuals may mature much later than this. The fish can live for up to 22 years in the wild, where the age of fish can be assessed through by the number of rings that are visible in scales, these represent seasonal growth patterns.

== Threats ==
Recent work has shown that chub ingest microplastic particles. Whereas many as 25% of sampled fish contained particles, these particles were not found in muscles. Many of the particles found were fibres that are released from clothes during washing, these are also ingested by macroinvertebrates such as Daphnia. Chub can also be contaminated by metal pollution such as copper, magnesium and sodium which can accumulate in tissues like the muscle, gills and liver. Young of the year fish contained particularly high levels of metal contaminants.

== Fishing for chub ==
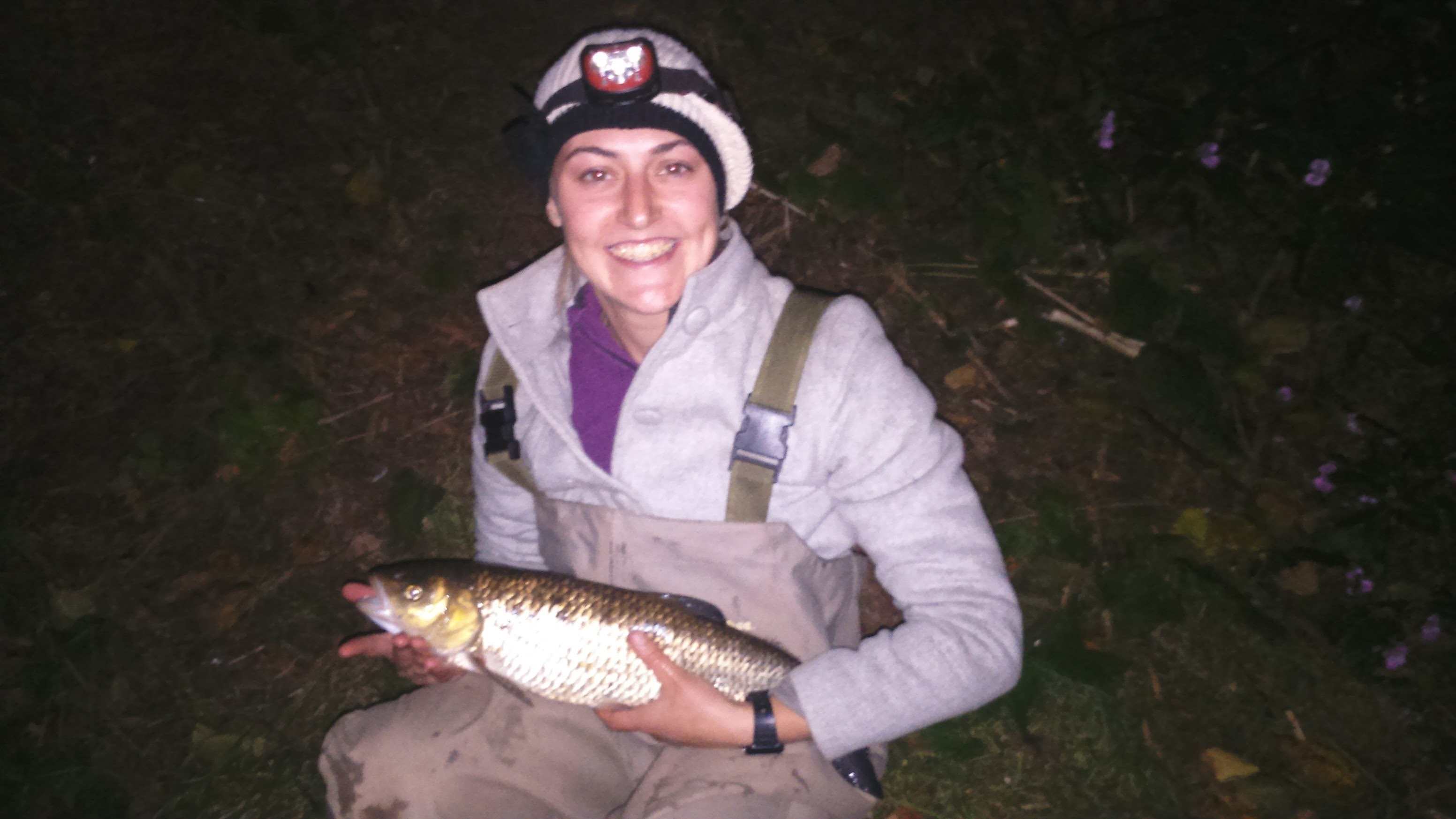
Chub caught from the River Teme, Worcestershire

They are popular with anglers due to their readiness to feed, and thus to be caught, in almost any conditions. Small chub are freely biting fish which even inexperienced anglers find easy to catch. As they become larger, however, chub become more wary and are easily spooked by noise or visual disturbance. Consequently, large chub (in excess of 2 kg) are keenly sought by anglers who prefer to target specific fish.

The British angling record for chub was broken on 16 March 2012 when Neil Steven caught a 9 pounds 5 ounces (4.2 kg) fish from the River Lea in Essex, though there are several over 10 lb on the Angling Trust's Top 50 list, which have been deprecated for various reasons. The European record is 5.72 kilograms (12.6 lb). The chub can reach a maximum length of 64–82 cm (24–31.5 in).

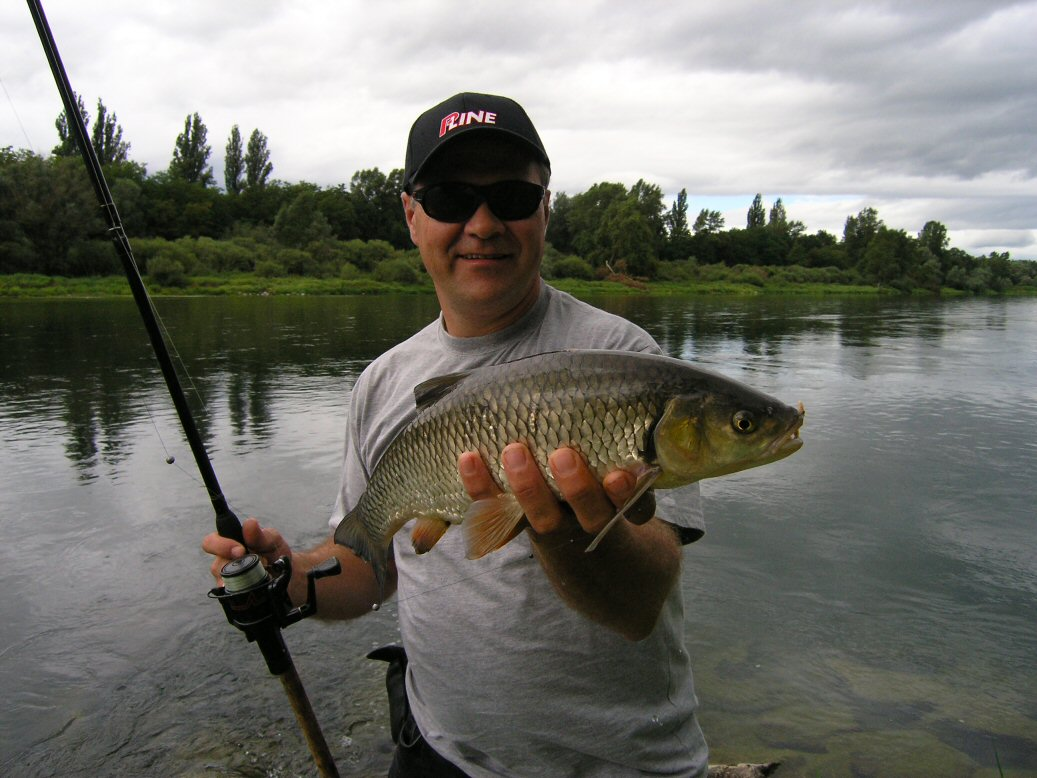
German chub catch from the typical environment

=== Tackle and tactics ===
Smaller chub are not too difficult to catch and on small or medium-sized rivers, a stick-float fishing approach can be adopted or even a swim-feeder and using almost any bait including maggots, luncheon meat, sweetcorn and even small lures and flies. Chub also eat marine derived fishmeal-based pellets and diets of wild chub diets contain 44% of these pellets. Catching the larger specimens however requires a patient and stealthy approach as most larger chub are caught on the smaller, clearer rivers and as a result, the angler must make their presence as subtle as possible and yet again, not a lot of tackle is required and most anglers may even set their tackle up before they get their favored spot as there is less noise from tackle being set up that may disturb the fish. A classic chub spot is just hanging off (or even inside) branches/bushes brushing through the water as chub are quite sensitive to sunlight and most anglers may fish at sunrise or sunset when the chub leave their entangled home. An angler should also look for where the current is being pushed out, causing a re-circulation pattern behind whatever is pushing the current outwards. This is where much food will wash around and where there will probably be feeding fish. Like with the smaller chub, a range of baits can be used but smaller baits such as maggots may attract small fish like minnows (especially on smaller rivers) so a larger bait such as luncheon meat is best used. In terms of the line setup, line ratings of a range of 4–8 pounds breaking-strain is ideal, less experienced anglers should use the tougher rating until they have gained knowledge about 'playing' the fish.

Feeder/ledger fishing

Traditionally a quiver-tip rod is used with at least four-pound line rating due to the weight of the ledger/feeder (heavier weights need a heavier line). In feeder fishing, bait will be put on a hook and inside a swim-feeder which the current will cause to flow out and attract fish to the hook's position so it involves fishing upstream of where the fish are, this usually involves smaller baits like bread, sweetcorn or maggots. The same applies to ledgering except there is a weight (called a ledger) instead of a swim-feeder and usually heavier baits are used here such as luncheon meat. Another method known as touch-ledgering can be used which involves not using a quiver-tip but instead holding the line that is loose off the reel and feeling for any pulls or the line going loose. Some anglers do this without any weights and let the bait slowly drift downstream with the line steadily moving through their hands, slugs and luncheon meat are excellent for this method.

Float fishing

This method could involve fishing under the rod-tip in deep water or letting the float gently drift to where the fish may be situated (known as trotting) whilst throwing portions of bait in the stream to encourage feeding. Usually a lighter rod may be used (no more than ten-foot) and sometimes a centrepin reel is used as it allows the line to smoothly come off the reel. Anglers must strike quickly when trotting as bites can be easy to miss sometimes. Drifting baits such as bread, sweetcorn and maggots are usually used here.

Lure fishing

This method is usually for the larger chub, a light spinning/lure rod with a fixed-spool reel of at least 10 pounds line rating as it is easy to snag onto debris when doing this method. Small lures such as bar-spoons and spoons or even small soft-plastics can imitate the smaller fish such as minnows that the larger chub feed on.

Fly-fishing

Using flies such as damselfly patterns or even larger, dark patterns such as those that imitate slugs can be very good if presented correctly. More obvious, shiny flies that imitate small fish may work for more aggressive chub, this method is all-year but best in warmer months. Nymph patterns also do well. In late summer grass hopper and beetle fly patterns also work very well.
