= Dace =

Dace is a common name encompassing many unrelated taxa of pelagic ray-finned fishes, placed in varying genera and families. The synonymous name usually denotes members of the family Leuciscidae (esp. the common dace (Leuciscus leuciscus)).

Most members known as daces, fall in the order Cypriniformes (notably the suborder Cyprinoidei), with one unrelated species in the order Acanthuriformes:

Order Cypriniformes:

- Common dace, Leuciscus leuciscus
- Chinese mud carp, Cirrhinus chinensis (called "dace" in Hong Kong) or mud carp (Cirrhinus molitorella)
- Columbia River dace, Ptychocheilus oregonensis (a pikeminnow)
- Desert dace, Eremichthys acros (a monotypic genus)
- European daces, genus Leuciscus
- Fallfish, Semotilus corporalis (a creek chub called "dace" in Canada)
- Horned dace, Semotilus atromaculatus (a creek chub)
- Japanese dace Tribolodon hakonensis, genus Tribolodon
- Korean splendid dace, Coreoleuciscus splendidus
- Lake Candidus dace, Candidia barbata
- Mexican daces, genus †Evarra
- Moapa dace, Moapa coriacea (a monotypic genus)
- Northwest dace, Mylocheilus caurinus (a peamouth)
- Allegheny pearl dace, Margariscus margarita
- Northern pearl dace, Margariscus nachtriebi
- Ponto-Caspian daces, genus Petroleuciscus
- Redbelly daces, genus Chrosomus
- Redside daces, genus Clinostomus, e.g.
  - Redside dace Clinostomus elongatus
  - Rosyside dace Clinostomus funduloides
- Relict dace, Relictus solitarius (a monotypic genus)
- Riffle daces, genus Rhinichthys (including Tiaroga)
- Saskatchewan dace, Platygobio gracilis (a flathead chub)
- Shining dace, Semotilus corporalis (a creek chub)
- Spikedace, Meda fulgida (a monotypic genus)
- Spinedaces, genus Lepidomeda

Order Acanthuriformes:

- European seabass (Dicentrarchus labrax)

== See also ==
- Vendace (disambiguation)
- Chub (disambiguation)
- Minnow
- Roach (fish)
- Shiner (fish)
