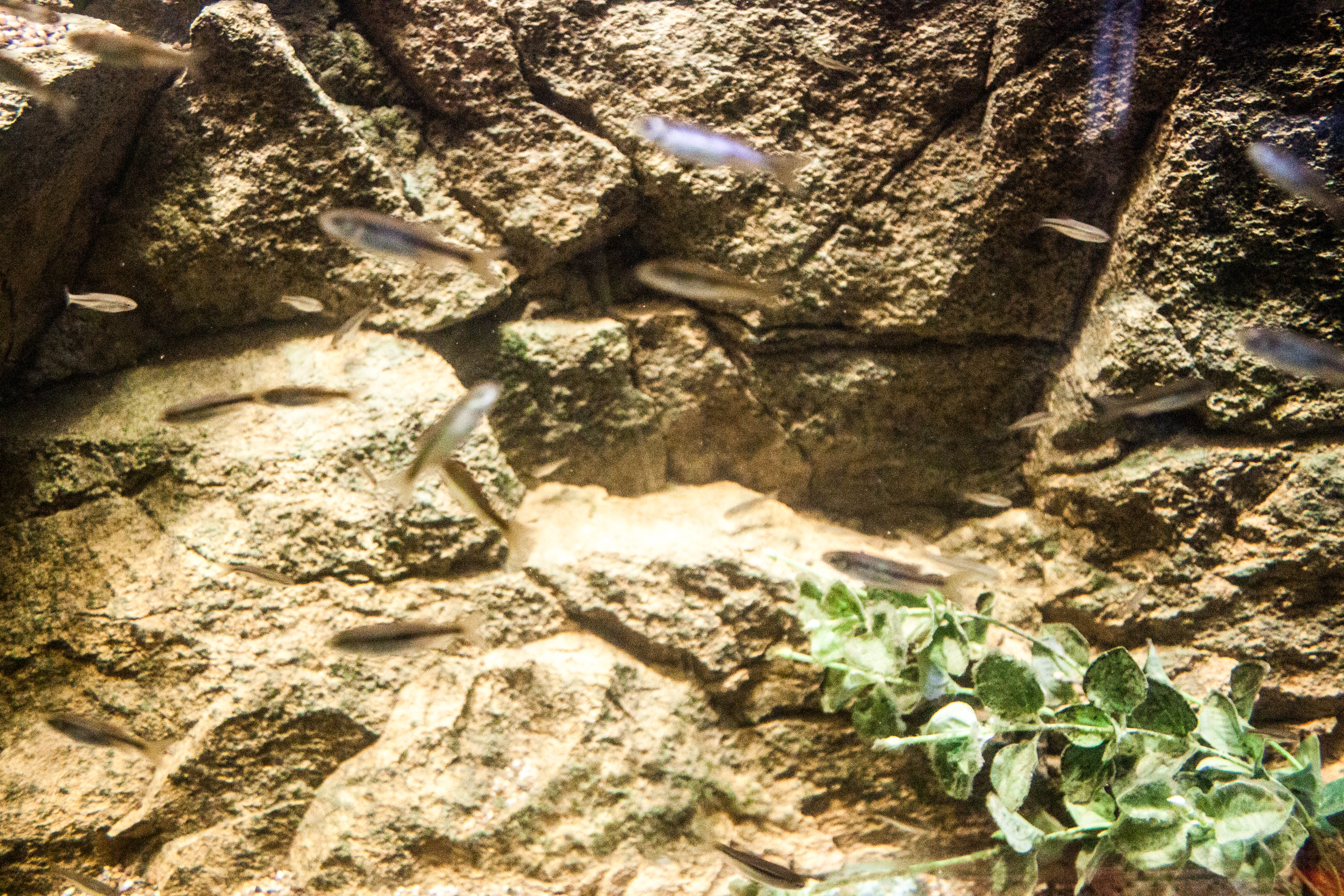

Conservation status
- Vulnerable (IUCN 3.1)

Scientific classification
- Kingdom: Animalia
- Phylum: Chordata
- Class: Actinopterygii
- Order: Cypriniformes
- Family: Leuciscidae
- Genus: Ladigesocypris
- Species: L. ghigii

Binomial name
- Ladigesocypris ghigii (Gianferrari, 1927)

Synonyms
- Leucaspius ghigii Gianferrari, 1927; Pseudophoxinus ghigii (Gianferrari 1927); Squalius ghigii (Gianferrari 1927); Leucaspius prosperi Gianferrari, 1927

= Ladigesocypris ghigii =

Species of fish

Ladigesocypris ghigii, the Rhodes minnow, gizani or ghizáni, is a species of freshwater ray-finned fish belonging to the family Leuciscidae, which includes the daces, Eurasian minnows and related species. It is endemic to the island of Rhodes in Greece.

== Taxonomy ==
Ladigesocypris ghigii was first formally described as Leucaspius ghigli ib 1927 by the Italian ichthyologist Luisa Gianferrari with its type locality given as the Mulini River at Coschino on Rhodes. In 1972 Mladen S. Karaman proposed the new genus Ladigesocypris with Leucaspius ghigli designated as the type species, as well as being the type by monotypy. The genus Ladigesocypris, which has one other species, L. mermere, classified within it, is classified within the subfamily Leuciscinae of the family Leuciscidae.

== Etymology ==
Ladigesocypris ghigii belongs to the genus Ladigesocypris, this name suffixes Ladiges, the surname of the German aquarist and ichthyologist Werner Ladiges, with cypris, a common suffix for Cyprinoid genera. Ladiges translated Karaman's manuscript. The specific name, 'is an eponym, the person honoured being Alessandro Ghigi, an Italian zoologist at the University of Bologna, the collectors of the holotype.

== Description ==
Ladigesocypris ghigii is told apart from other related species in the Balkans by having an incomplete lateral line, which has between 11 and 17 perforated scales with 27 to 23 total scales in the midlateral row. The dorsal fin has 6 to 8 1/2 branched rays while the anal fin has 7 to 9 1/2 branched rays. There is a wide dark midlateral stripe running from the head to base of the caudal fin, which separates the dark brown back from the white belly. The Rhodes minnow has a maximum standard length 9 cm (3.5 in).

== Distribution and habitat ==
Ladigesocypris ghigii is endemic to Rhodes in the Dodecanese of Greece where it is found in streams, springs, reservoirs and pools.
