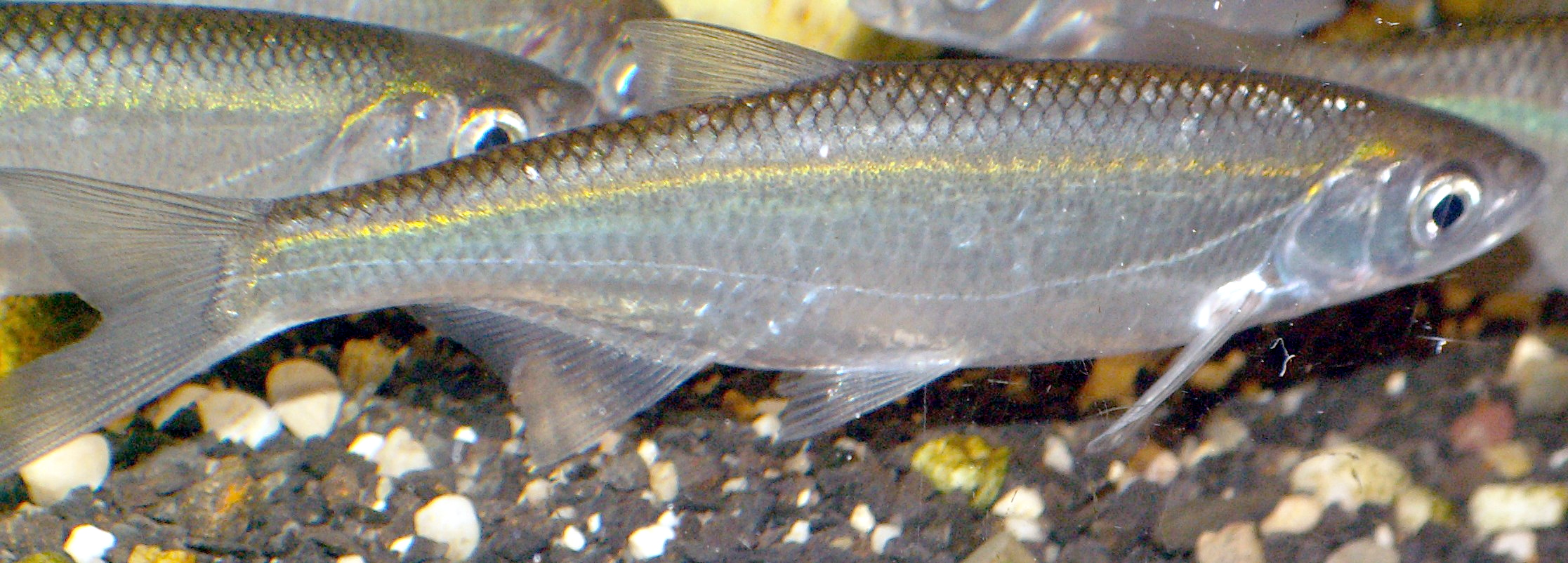
- Alburnus alburnus

Scientific classification
- Kingdom: Animalia
- Phylum: Chordata
- Class: Actinopterygii
- Order: Cypriniformes
- Family: Cyprinidae
- Subfamily: Alburninae; Girard, 1858

Genera
- Alburnoides Jeitteles, 1861; Alburnus Rafinesque, 1820; Aspiolucius Berg, 1907; Metzia Jordan & Thompson, 1914

= Alburninae =

Subfamily of fishes

Alburninae is a small subfamily of the carp and minnow family of ray-finned fish, the Cyprinidae. The genera in this subfamily were previously considered to be part of the Leuciscinae, but if the three Alburninae genera are included in that subfamily, it is paraphyletic. The Alburninae are still a contentious group and some authorities consider it to consist of two distinct clades, making it biphyletic.
