= Acanthobrama hadiyahensis =

Conservation status
- Critically Endangered (IUCN 3.1)

Scientific classification
- Kingdom: Animalia
- Phylum: Chordata
- Class: Actinopterygii
- Division: Teleostei
- Order: Cypriniformes
- Family: Leuciscidae
- Subfamily: Leuciscinae
- Genus: Acanthobrama
- Species: A. hadiyahensis

Binomial name
- Acanthobrama hadiyahensis Coad, Alkahem & Behnke, 1983

Species of fish

Acanthobrama hadiyahensis , the Arabian bream, is a species of freshwater ray-finned fish belonging to the family Leuciscidae, the daces, Eurasian minnows and related fishes. This bream is endemic to Saudi Arabia.

== Taxonomy ==
Acanthobrama hadiyahensis was first formally described in 1983 by Brian W. Coad, Hamoud Fares Alkahem and Robert J. Behnke with its type locality given as Wadi Hadiyah, near Hadiyah in Saudi Arabia at about 25°33'N, 38°44'E. This species is the only known species of its family in Arabia. This species is classified within the genus Acanthobrama which is classified within the subfamily Leuciscinae of the family Leuciscidae. Within its genus this species appears to be closest to A. telavivensis.

== Etymology ==
Acanthobrama hadiyahensis is a member of the genus Acanthobrama, this name prefixes acantho-, meaning "spine", onto brama, which is derived from abramis the Latin name for a bream or mullet. The specific name refers to the type locality, Wadi Hadiyah.

== Description ==
Acanthobrama hadiyahensis has the following characteristics which distinguish it from its congeners; there are 17—19 gill rakers in total on the first gill arch, the terminal mouth is angled at 40° or less from the horizontal; there are 54-58 lateral line scales; there are 7 branched dorsal fin rays 7 and branched anal fin rays 14-17; and the total number of vertebrae is 38 or 39. This species has small scales and no barbels and is golden in colour with orange bases to the paired fins and caudal fin, the spines of the dorsala and anal fins are red.It has an elongated body shape.

== Distribution and habitat ==
Acanthobrama hadiyahensis is endemic to Saudi Arabia where it is restricted to the Wadi Hadiyah basin which drains into the Red Sea. When this species was described the authors named two locations it occurred at, the type locality and Ain Aljymyma, a third location was found in 2013 at the Qusaiba’a Dam near Khaybar City. This species is found in wadis and springs, with the most recent record coming from a reservoir.

== Conservation status ==
Acanthobrama hadiyahensis has been assessed as Near Threatened by the iucn as its range is restricted to a single location which is threatened by water abstraction and damming, the damming may cut off the flow from the upper to lower parts of the wadi.
