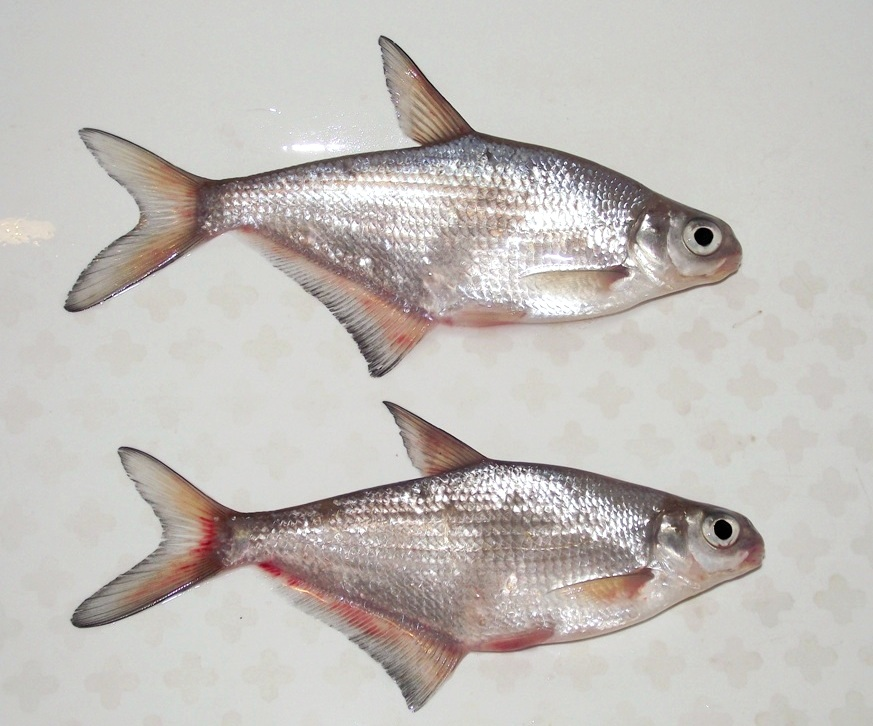

Conservation status
- Least Concern (IUCN 3.1)

Scientific classification
- Kingdom: Animalia
- Phylum: Chordata
- Class: Actinopterygii
- Division: Teleostei
- Order: Cypriniformes
- Family: Leuciscidae
- Subfamily: Leuciscinae
- Genus: Ballerus
- Species: B. sapa

Binomial name
- Ballerus sapa (Pallas, 1814)
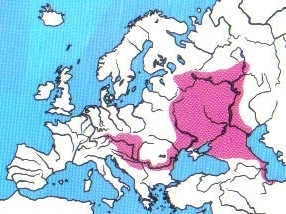
- The range of the species

Synonyms
- Cyprinus sapa Pallas, 1814; Abramis sapa (Pallas, 1814); Cyprinus brama minor Forster, 1767; Cyprinus cleveza Pallas, 1814; Abramis schreibersii Heckel, 1836; Abramis sapa bergi Belyaeff, 1929; Abramis sapa aralensis Tiapkin, 1939

= White-eye bream =

Species of fish

White-eye bream (Ballerus sapa) is a species of freshwater ray-finned fish belonging to the family Leuciscidae, which includes the daces, minnows and related fishes. This species is indigenous to Europe and Western Asia in the rivers draining into the Black, Azov, Caspian and Aral Seas, although it is invasive elsewhere.

== Taxonomy ==
The white-eye bream was first formally described in 1814 by the German zoologist, botanist and natural historian Peter Simon Pallas with its type locality given as the Volga River and its tributaries. In 1843 Johann Jakob Heckel proposed the monospecific genus Ballerus with Cyprinus ballerus as its only species. This species is now classified within Ballerus, this genus belongs to the subfamily Leuciscinae of the family Leucicsidae.

== Etymology ==
The white-eye bream is classified within the genus Ballerus, a name which Heckel used tautonymously from Cyprinus ballerus, ballerus being derived from the Greek word baléros, the ancient name for the zope (B. ballerus) first written down by Aristotle. The specific name sapa which is a common name for this species in Russian.

== Identification ==
The white-eye bream is distinguished from the zope by its small and inferior mouth, having between 47 and 54 scales on the lateral line and in having a large eye which has a diameter that is roughly equal to the length of the snout. The maximum published total length of 35 cm (14 in), although 15 cm (5.9 in) is more typical.

== Distribution and habitat ==
The white eyed bream is native to central and eastern Europe and western Asia in rivers that drain into the Black, Azov, Caspian and Aral Seas. It has been introduced to Lake Ladoga, the northern part of the Dvina system, the Rhine and some of the rivers draining into the Baltic Sea. It has invaded the Vistula river system by Lessepsian migration through the Dnieper–Bug Canal. This species occurs in large fast flowing lowland rivers and estuaries. The eastern, brackish populations enter the lower reach of rivers for spawning.

== Biology ==
The white-eyed bream feeds on benthic invertebrates. They attain sexual maturity at 3 or 4 years of age. The inland subpopulations spawn from April to May, requiring the water temperatures to be greater than 8 °C (46 °F). They spawn in large aggregations in fast-flowing water, depsoting eggs on gravel substrates or among submerged vegetation. Estuarine subpopulations feed in brackish water migrate upstream to fresh water in late autumn.
