= Petroleuciscus smyrnaeus =

Conservation status
- Vulnerable (IUCN 3.1)

Scientific classification
- Kingdom: Animalia
- Phylum: Chordata
- Class: Actinopterygii
- Order: Cypriniformes
- Family: Leuciscidae
- Subfamily: Leuciscinae
- Genus: Petroleuciscus
- Species: P. smyrnaeus

Binomial name
- Petroleuciscus smyrnaeus (Boulenger, 1896)

Synonyms
- Leuciscus smyrnaeus Boulenger, 1896; Squalius smyrnaeus (Boulenger 1896)

Species of fish

Petroleuciscus smyrnaeus, the Izmir chub or Smyrna chub, is a species of freshwater ray-finned fish belonging to the family Leuciscidae, the daces, Eurasian minnows and related fishes. This species is found in Western Anatolia, Turkey, and Lesbos, in Greece.

== Taxonomy ==
Petroleuciscus smyrnaeus was first formally described as Leuciscus smyrnaeus by the Belgian-born British ichthyologist and herpetologist George Albert Boulenger with its type locality given as İzmir in Turkey. This taxon is now classified in the genus Petroleuciscus, which is classified in the subfamily Leuciscinae in the family Leuciscidae.

== Etymology ==
Petroleuciscus smyrnaeusis classified in the genus Petroleuciscus, this name was proposed in 2002 by Nina Gidalevna Bogutskaya and it combines Petro, a Latinisation of Petr, the forename of the Romanian ichthyologist Petre Mihai Bănărescu and of Boguskaya's son Petre Naseka, with Leuciscus, the genus many of the fishes classified in this new genus were previously classified in. The specific name, smyrnaeus, means "of Smyrna", the old name for Izmir.

== Description ==
Petroleuciscus smyrnaeus has 3 spines and between 7 or 8 soft rays, 8 to 7 1/2 rays being branched, in the dorsal fin while its anal fin has 3 spines and between 2 and 10 soft rays, 9 to 8 1/2 rays being branched. It has a whitish iris. The lateral line has between 32 and 35 scales. The rear margin of the anal fin is straight or marginally concave. There are black spots on the flank scales. This species has a maximum total length of 10 cm (3.9 in).

== Distribution and habitat ==
Petroleuciscus smyrnaeus occurs in the Aegean drainage of Western Anatolia between the Bakırçay and Gediz systems, as well as on the island of Lesbos in Greece. It has been introduced elsewhere. The Izmir chub is found in the lower reaches of rivers, canals, reservoirs and lakes.

== Conservation ==
Petroleuciscus smyrnaeus is classified a Vulnerable by the International Union for Conservation of Nature with the major threat being water pollution, as well as drought caused by water abstraction and climate change.
