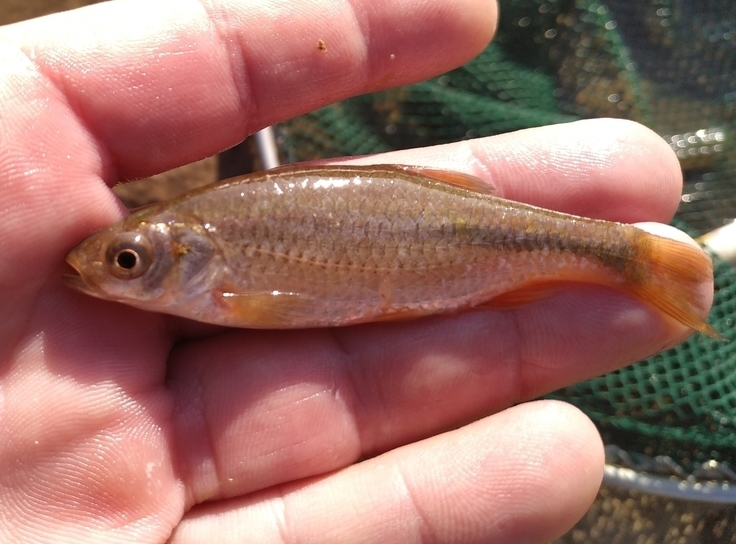
- P. borysthenicus in Neo Sidirochori, Greece

Conservation status
- Least Concern (IUCN 3.1)

Scientific classification
- Kingdom: Animalia
- Phylum: Chordata
- Class: Actinopterygii
- Order: Cypriniformes
- Family: Leuciscidae
- Subfamily: Leuciscinae
- Genus: Petroleuciscus
- Species: P. borysthenicus

Binomial name
- Petroleuciscus borysthenicus (Kessler, 1859)

Synonyms
- Squalius borysthenicus Kessler, 1859; Leuciscus borysthenicus (Kessler, 1859); Telestes leucoides De Filippi, 1863; Leuciscus heterandrius Battalgil, 1940

= Dnieper chub =

Species of fish

The Dnieper chub or the Black Sea chub (Petroleuciscus borysthenicus) is a species of freshwater ray-finned fish belonging to the family Leuciscidae, the daces, Eurasian minnows and related fishes. This species is found in rivers draining into the Black Sea and Sea of Azov, as well as the rivers] draining into the northern Aegean Sea.

== Taxonomy ==
The Dnieper chub was first formally described as Squalius borysthenicus by the Baltic German zoologist Karl Kessler with its type locality given as an arm of the Dnieper River at Aleschki, Ukraine. This taxon has been classified in the genus Squalius but it is now classified in the genus Petroleuciscus. It is the type species of that genus which is classified in the subfamily Leuciscinae in the family Leuciscidae.

== Etymology ==
The Dnieper chub is classified in the genus Petroleuciscus, this name was proposed in 2002 by Nina Gidalevna Bogutskaya and it combines Petro, a Latinisation of Petr, the forename of the Romanian ichthyologist Petre Mihai Bănărescu and of Boguskaya's son Petre Naseka, with Leuciscus, the genus many of the fishes classified in this new genus were previously classified in. The specific name, borysthenicus, means "belonging to Borysthenes", the name given to the Dneiper Valley region in ancient times.

== Description ==
The Dnieper chub has 3 or 4 spines and between 8 and 10 soft rays, 8 to 9 1/2 rays being branched, in the dorsal fin while its anal fin has 3 or 4 spines and between 9 and 12 soft rays, 9 to 10 1/2 rays being branched. It has an orange to red iris. The lateral line has between 33 and 40 scales. The rear margin of the anal fin is convex. There are no spots on the flank scales. This species has a maximum total length of 40 cm (16 in), although 18 cm (7.1 in) is more typical.

== Distribution and habitat ==
The Dneiper chub is found in the drainage systems that drain into the Black Sea and Sea of Azov, from Bulgaria to the Dnipr, although it is absent from the Crimea and the Don, then again on the eastern shore of the Black Sea in Georgia and Russia and in northern Anatolia. It also occurs in the northern basin of the Aegean Sea as far west as the Struma. This species is found in lowland rivers, the lower reaches of montane rivers, limans, lakes, deltas, backwaters with moderate to no current. It prefers warmwaters and can tolerate water temperatures up to 30-32°C and it can tolerate quite low oxygen levels, living in marshes and water bodies with dense vegetation. It is typically a freshwater fish, but can tolerate the brackish waters of limans. It prefers substrates of sand, sand-mud or mud.

== Biology ==
The Dneiper chub is mainly insectivorous but it will also feed on benthic invertebrates, plankton and algae. It gathers in groups of up to 150 fishes for spawning. A female will spawn two or three times in a season, the season runs from May to June. This is regarded as a non-migratory fish but they will move into deeper water in the winter.

== Sources ==
- Froese, Rainer; Pauly, Daniel, eds. (2012). "Petroleuciscus borysthenicus". FishBase.
