= Jeitteles =

Jeitteles is a surname in central Europe. Notable people with the surname include:

- Andreas Ludwig Jeitteles (1799-1878), professor at the University of Vienna
- Judah Jeitteles (1773–1838), Hebrew writer
- Ludwig Heinrich Jeitteles (1830–1883), Austrian zoologist and prehistorian
