= Acanthobrama persidis =

Scientific classification
- Kingdom: Animalia
- Phylum: Chordata
- Class: Actinopterygii
- Order: Cypriniformes
- Family: Leuciscidae
- Subfamily: Leuciscinae
- Genus: Acanthobrama
- Species: A. persidis

Binomial name
- Acanthobrama persidis Coad, 1981

Species of fish

Acanthobrama persidis is a species of freshwater ray-finned fish belonging to the family Leuciscidae. This species is endemic to Maharlu Lake, the Kor River, and the Hormuz and Persis basins, Iran.
