= Aphips chub =

Conservation status
- Least Concern (IUCN 3.1)

Scientific classification
- Kingdom: Animalia
- Phylum: Chordata
- Class: Actinopterygii
- Order: Cypriniformes
- Family: Leuciscidae
- Subfamily: Leuciscinae
- Genus: Petroleuciscus
- Species: P. aphipsi

Binomial name
- Petroleuciscus aphipsi (Aleksandrov, 1927)

Synonyms
- Leuciscus aphipsi Aleksandrov, 1927; Squalius aphipsi (Aleksandrov, 1927)

Species of fish

The Aphips chub (Petroleuciscus aphipsi) is a species of freshwater ray-finned fish belonging to the family Leuciscidae, the daces, Eurasian minnows and related fishes. This species is endemic to southeastern Russia.

== Taxonomy ==
The Aphips chub was first formally described as Leuciscus aphipsi by the Russian biologist A. I. Aleksandrov with its type locality given as the Aphips River above Krepostnaya in the Kuban Basin in Russia. This taxon has been classified in the genus Squalius but it is now classified in the genus Petroleuciscus. This genus is classified in the subfamily Leuciscinae in the family Leuciscidae.

== Etymology ==
The Aphips chub is classified in the genus Petroleuciscus, this name was proposed in 2002 by Nina Gidalevna Bogutskaya and it combines Petro, a Latinisation of Petr, the forename of the Romanian ichthyologist Petre Mihai Bănărescu and of Boguskaya's son Petre Naseka, with Leuciscus, the genus many of the fishes classified in this new genus were previously classified in. The specific name, aphipsi, refers to the type locality.

== Description ==
The Aphips chub has 9 1/2 branched rays in the anal fin between 36 and 41 scales in the lateral line, the body depth is a fifth to a quarter of the standard length. There is a row of black spots along the margin of each scale on the sides which form a regular, net pattern. The anal and pelvic fins are orange to red. This species has a maximum standard length of 16 cm (6.3 in).

== Distribution and habitat ==
The Aphips chub is endemic to the southern tributaries of the Kuban from the Adagum to Laba rivers in the Russian Federation. This species is found in foothill and mountain streams with a strong to moderate current and a rock or gravel bottom. It may be restricted to very small pools during the dry months.

== Biology ==
The Aphips chub feeds mainly on terrestrial insects, benthic invertebrates and algae. In winter they move downstream to deeper pools and in summer they may migrate up to the headwaters. This species uses shallow riffles for spawning, the females laying 2 or 3 batches of eggs which adhere to pebbles and hatch in 3 days. The larvae avoid the light and hide under stones. Once the larvae start to actively feed they drift to shallow areas.
