= Delminichthys krbavensis =

Conservation status
- Critically Endangered (IUCN 3.1)

Scientific classification
- Kingdom: Animalia
- Phylum: Chordata
- Class: Actinopterygii
- Order: Cypriniformes
- Family: Leuciscidae
- Subfamily: Leuciscinae
- Genus: Delminichthys
- Species: D. krbavensis

Binomial name
- Delminichthys krbavensis (Zupančič & Bogutskaya, 2002)

Synonyms
- Phoxinellus krbavensis Zupančič & Bogutskaya, 2002

Species of fish

Delminichthys krbavensis, the Krbava minnow, is a species of freshwater ray-finned fish belonging to the family Leuciscidae. This species is found in southeastern Europe. It is found only in Krbavsko Polje in Croatia, in a single karstic freshwater spring. It has disappeared from stream habitats, and is threatened by further habitat loss.

== Sources ==
- Froese, Rainer; Pauly, Daniel (eds.). "Delminichthys krbavensis". FishBase. August 2011 version.
