= Acanthobrama lissneri =

Conservation status
- Near Threatened (IUCN 3.1)

Scientific classification
- Kingdom: Animalia
- Phylum: Chordata
- Class: Actinopterygii
- Division: Teleostei
- Order: Cypriniformes
- Family: Leuciscidae
- Subfamily: Leuciscinae
- Genus: Acanthobrama
- Species: A. lissneri

Binomial name
- Acanthobrama lissneri Tortonese, 1952

Synonyms
- Acanthobrama terraesanctae oligolepis Karaman, 1972

Species of fish

Acanthobrama lissneri, or the Jordan bream, is a species of freshwater ray-finned fish belonging to the family Leuciscidae, which includes the true minnows, shiners, daces and related species. This fish is found in lakes and rivers in southwestern Asia, it has been introduced into recervoirs and the Azraq Oasis.

== Taxonomy ==
Acanthobrama lissneri was first formally described in 1952 by the Italian ichthyologist Ernico Tortenese with its type locality given as Lake Tiberias in Israel. This species is classified within the genus Acanthobrama which is classified within the subfamily Leuciscinae of the family Leuciscidae.

== Etymology ==
Acanthobrama lissneri is a member of the genus Acanthobrama, this name prefixes acantho-, meaning "spine", onto brama, which is derived from abramis the Latin name for a bream or mullet. The specific name honours the Polish-born Israeli ichthyologist Helmut Lissner who advanced the study of the fish fauna of Lake Tiberias.

== Description ==
Acanthobrama lissneri has 10 soft rays in its dorsal fin while its anal fin has between 12 and 16 soft rays. It has an elongate and compressed, fusiform body and reaches a total length of 12 cm (4.7 in), although 8 cm (3.1 in) is more typical. The mouth is terminal reaching to under the nostrils.

== Distribution and habitat ==
Acanthobrama lissneri is largely restricted to the upper and central Jordan River basin, where it is widely distributed in lakes and most tributaries of the river in Israel, Jordan and Syria. It is also found in the Qishon River, the only watercourse it occurs in on the Israeli coastal plain. This species has been introduced to Azraq wetland in Jordan. It is a benthopelagic fish which occurs in lakes and rivers, spawing in January to April.

== Conservation status ==
Acanthobrama lissneri has been assessed as Near Threatened by the International Union for Conservation of Nature because there have neen significant declines in parts of its range and the species is thought to have undergone a deline of up to 30% in the ten years leading up to their assessment, the main threats being water abstraction, droughts and pollution.
