= Syr-Darya dace =

Conservation status
- Least Concern (IUCN 3.1)

Scientific classification
- Kingdom: Animalia
- Phylum: Chordata
- Class: Actinopterygii
- Order: Cypriniformes
- Family: Leuciscidae
- Subfamily: Leuciscinae
- Genus: Petroleuciscus
- Species: P. squaliusculus

Binomial name
- Petroleuciscus squaliusculus (Kessler, 1872)

Synonyms
- Squalius squaliusculus

Species of fish

The Syr-Darya dace (Petroleuciscus squaliusculus) is a species of ray-finned fish in the family Cyprinidae. It is endemic to the Aral Sea basin.
