= Acanthobrama marmid =

Conservation status
- Least Concern (IUCN 3.1)

Scientific classification
- Kingdom: Animalia
- Phylum: Chordata
- Class: Actinopterygii
- Division: Teleostei
- Order: Cypriniformes
- Family: Leuciscidae
- Subfamily: Leuciscinae
- Genus: Acanthobrama
- Species: A. marmid

Binomial name
- Acanthobrama marmid Heckel, 1843

Synonyms
- Acanthobrama cupida Heckel, 1843; Acanthobrama arrhada Heckel, 1843

Species of fish

Acanthobrama marmid, or the Mesopotamian bream or Tigris bream, is a species of freshwater fish in the family Leuciscidae. It is widespread and abundant in the Tigris–Euphrates river system. It lives in many kinds of lowland waters, and can also tolerate modified water bodies such as reservoirs and moderately-polluted rivers.

It can grow up to a length of 30 cm. It is caught commercially but is of low value.
