= Anaecypris punica =

Conservation status
- Critically Endangered (IUCN 3.1)

Scientific classification
- Kingdom: Animalia
- Phylum: Chordata
- Class: Actinopterygii
- Order: Cypriniformes
- Family: Leuciscidae
- Subfamily: Leuciscinae
- Genus: Anaecypris
- Species: A. punica

Binomial name
- Anaecypris punica (Pellegrin, 1920)

Synonyms
- Phoxinellus punicus Pellegrin, 1920; Pseudophoxinus punicus (Pellegrin 1920)

Species of fish

Anaecypris punica is a species of ray-finned fish in the family Leuciscidae. It is found only in Tunisia and eastern Algeria. Its natural habitat is rivers.
