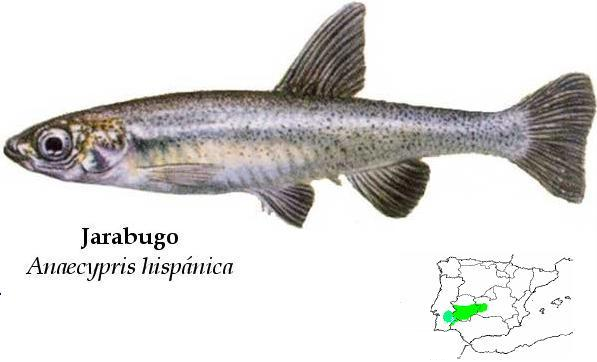

Conservation status
- Near Threatened (IUCN 3.1)

Scientific classification
- Kingdom: Animalia
- Phylum: Chordata
- Class: Actinopterygii
- Order: Cypriniformes
- Family: Leuciscidae
- Subfamily: Leuciscinae
- Genus: Anaecypris
- Species: A. hispanica

Binomial name
- Anaecypris hispanica (Steindachner, 1866)
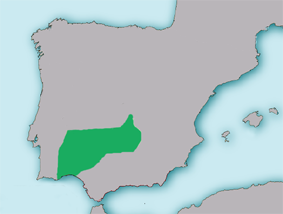

Synonyms
- Phoxinus hispanicus Steindachner, 1866

= Anaecypris hispanica =

Species of fish

Anaecypris hispanica, the Spanish minnowcarp, or jarabugo, is a small species of ray-finned fish species in the family Leuciscidae. It is endemic to the Iberian Peninsula and is found in the basin of the Guadiana River in southern Spain and Portugal.

== Taxonomy ==
Anaecypris hispanica was first formally described as Phoxinus hispanica in 1866 by the Austrian ichthyologist Franz Steindachner with its type locality given as the Guadiana River near Mérida in Spain. In 1983 Maria João Collares-Pereira proposed the genus Anaecypris with P. hispanica as its type species. The genus Anaecypris is classified within the subfamily Leuciscinae of the family Leuciscidae.

== Etymology ==
Anaecypris hispanica is the type species of the genus Anaecypris, this name combines Anas, the Latin name for the Guadiana, with cypris, meaning a small carp, a common suffix used in the names of cyprinoid genera. The specific name hispanica, the Roman name for the Iberian peninsula, where this species is endemic.

== Description ==
Anaecypris hispanica differs from related fishes present on the Iberian peninsula by possessing an upturned mouth, the origin of the dorsal fin is behind the base of the pelvic fin base, there is a scaleless keel between the pelvic fin and the anus and there is an incomplete lateral line has between 2 and 23 pored scales. This species has a maximum fork length of 7.5 cm (3.0 in)>

== Distribution and habitat ==
Anaecypris hispanica is endemic to the Iberian Peninsula where it is found in the drainage system of the Guadiana with an isolated population in the Rio Bembézar in the Guadalquivir drainage. The Spanish minnowcarp is found in shallow stretches of minor streams and rivers, these streams are subject to wide variations of flow. Many of them can almost completelydry out during summer and autumn, when the fish survive in the disconnected pools remaining until the flow resumes. When the flow is high these fishes are found in both riffles and deeper poolswhere the streambed is made up of exposed bedrocks, cobbles and gravel.

== Biology ==
Anaecypris hispanica feeds on filamentous algae and small invertebrates. At the beginning of the summer the fishes migrate upstream to spawn and return downstream to refuge areas where there is permanent water throughout the year.
