= Mirogrex terraesanctae =

Conservation status
- Least Concern (IUCN 3.1)

Scientific classification
- Kingdom: Animalia
- Phylum: Chordata
- Class: Actinopterygii
- Order: Cypriniformes
- Family: Leuciscidae
- Subfamily: Leuciscinae
- Genus: Mirogrex
- Species: M. terraesanctae

Binomial name
- Mirogrex terraesanctae (Steinitz, 1952)

Synonyms
- Acanthobrama terraesanctae Steinitz, 1952

Species of fish

Mirogrex terraesanctae, the Kinneret bream or Kinneret bleak, is a species of freshwater ray-finned fish belonging to the family Leuciscidae. It is known from two lakes: Lake Tiberias (Sea of Galilee, Lake Kinneret), Israel, and Lake Muzayrib, Syria. This is a small planktivorous fish, typically about 14 cm long, occurring near surface in large schools. It is very abundant in Lake Tiberias, whereas there is little information on the other lake, which is small (0.5 km^{2}) and can hold a small population anyway.
