= Acanthobrama thisbeae =

Scientific classification
- Kingdom: Animalia
- Phylum: Chordata
- Class: Actinopterygii
- Order: Cypriniformes
- Family: Leuciscidae
- Subfamily: Leuciscinae
- Genus: Acanthobrama
- Species: A. thisbeae

Binomial name
- Acanthobrama thisbeae Freyhof & Özulug, 2014

Species of fish

Acanthobrama thisbeae is a species of freshwater ray-finned fish belonging to the family Leuciscidae. This fish is endemic to Turkey.
