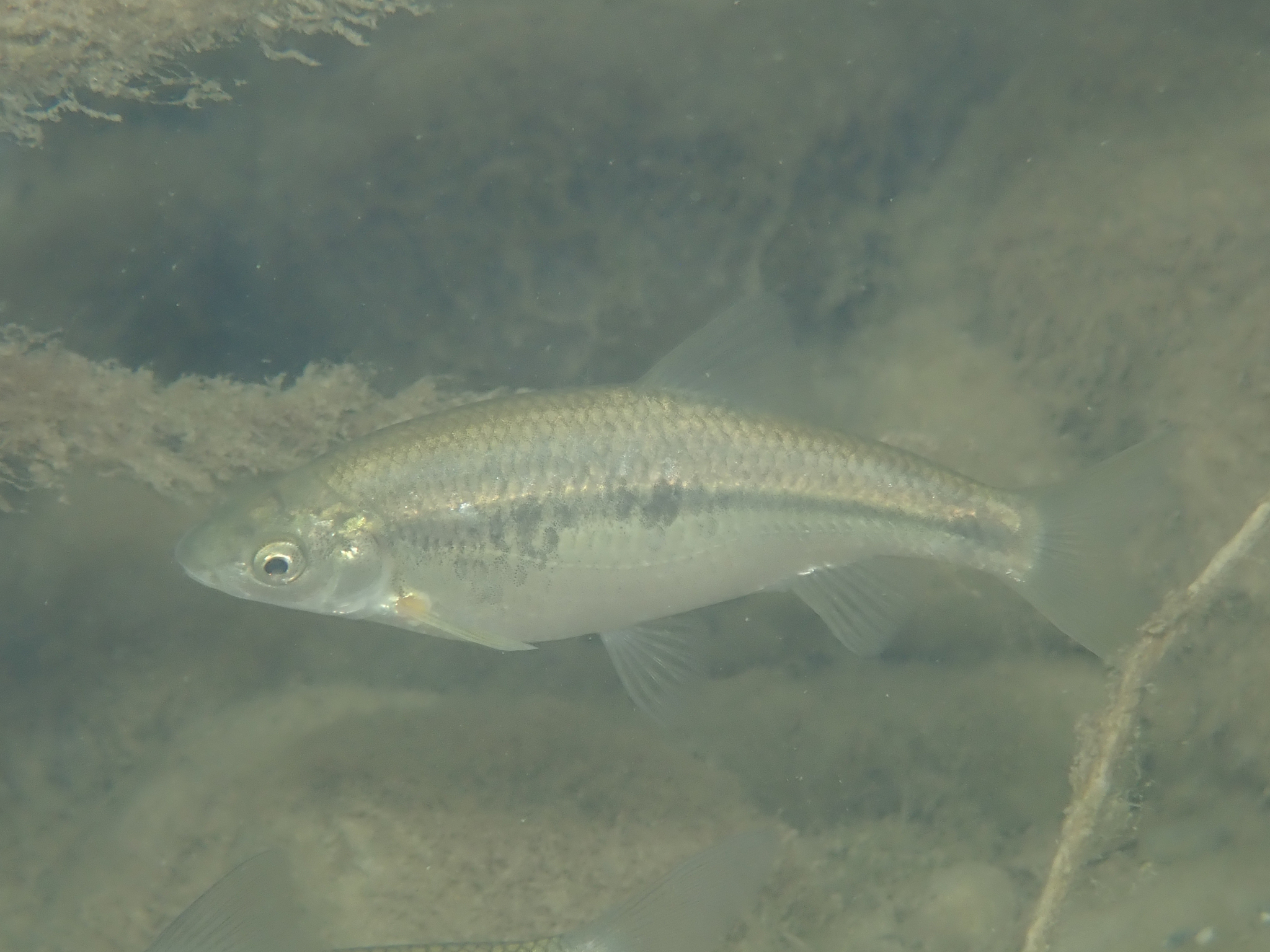

Conservation status
- Near Threatened (IUCN 3.1)

Scientific classification
- Kingdom: Animalia
- Phylum: Chordata
- Class: Actinopterygii
- Division: Teleostei
- Order: Cypriniformes
- Family: Leuciscidae
- Subfamily: Leuciscinae
- Genus: Pachychilon
- Species: P. pictum

Binomial name
- Pachychilon pictum (Heckel & Kner, 1858)

Synonyms
- Squalius pictus Heckel & Kner, 1858

= Pachychilon pictum =

Species of fish

Pachychilon pictum, the Albanian roach or Albanian minnow, is a species of freshwater ray-finned fish belonging to the family Leuciscidae, which includes the daces, Eurasian minnows and related species. This species is endemic to the Western Balkans and has been introduced to France and Italy.

== Taxonomy ==
Pachychilon pictum was first formally described as Squalius pictus in 1858 by the Austrian ichthyologists Johann Jakob Heckel and Rudolf Kner with its type locality given as the Reka river in Montenegro. In 1882 Franz Steindachner proposed a new subgenus of Leuciscus named Pachychilon for this species, Pachychilon is now regarded as a valid genus and this species is the type species of that genus by monotypy. The genus Pachychilon within the subfamily Leuciscinae of the family Leuciscidae.

== Etymology ==
Pachychilon pictum is a member of the genus Pachychilon a name which combine pachys, meaning thick, with chilon, a latinisation of cheilos, which means lips, a reference to the thick lips of the fishes in this genus. The specific name, pictum, means "painted", an allusion to the variously sized and located dark brown marks on the body.

== Description ==
Pachychilon pictum has its dorsal fin supported by 3 spines and between 7 and 9 softs rays while the anal fin contains 3 spines and between 8 and 10 soft rays. The main feature that distinguishes this species from P. macedonicum is the many variously shaped and sized brown markings on the body,, with a dark midlateral stripe which fades on preserved specimens. The lower lip is thick with a long lobe in the middle. There are between 40 and 44 pored scales along the lateral line and the anal fin has 8 to 10 1/2 branched fin rays. This species has a maximum standard length of 12 cm (4.7 in).

== Distribution and habitat ==
Pachychilon pictum is endemic to the Western Balkans where it is found from the Bojana River in Montenegro and northern Albania to the Vjosa in southern Albania and Greece, it is found in the drainages of Lake Ohrid and Lake Skadar. The native range is in Albania, Greece, Kosovo, Montenegro, North Macedonia and Serbia. Introduced populations are found in the Adour, Dordogne, Garonne and Aude rivers in France and in the Serchio system and Lake Massaciuccoli in Tuscany, Italy. The Albanian roach prefers slow-moving river stretches, backwaters, side channels and large oligotrophic lakes. It may also be found in canals and reservoirs.
