= Acanthobrama tricolor =

Conservation status
- Critically endangered, possibly extinct (IUCN 3.1)

Scientific classification
- Kingdom: Animalia
- Phylum: Chordata
- Class: Actinopterygii
- Order: Cypriniformes
- Family: Leuciscidae
- Subfamily: Leuciscinae
- Genus: Acanthobrama
- Species: A. tricolor

Binomial name
- Acanthobrama tricolor (Lortet, 1883)

Synonyms
- Leuciscus tricolor Lortet, 1883

Species of fish

Acanthobrama tricolor, or the Damascus bream, is a species of freshwater fish in the family Leuciscidae. It is endemic to Syria and the Golan Heights, and is recently only known by two specimens found in the Masil al Fawwar river system in the late 1980s. It has been extirpated from the Barada river system, where it has not been seen since 1908. It is considered Critically Endangered, and may possibly be extinct, but no studies of the river systems in the Golan Heights have been conducted, and it may still survive there, but the lower Barada is now dry, and the middle portions of the river are heavily polluted.
