= Delminichthys jadovensis =

Conservation status
- Critically Endangered (IUCN 3.1)

Scientific classification
- Kingdom: Animalia
- Phylum: Chordata
- Class: Actinopterygii
- Order: Cypriniformes
- Family: Leuciscidae
- Subfamily: Leuciscinae
- Genus: Delminichthys
- Species: D. jadovensis

Binomial name
- Delminichthys jadovensis (Zupančič & Bogutskaya, 2002)

Synonyms
- Phoxinellus jadovensis Zupančič & Bogutskaya, 2002

Species of fish

Delminichthys jadovensis the Jadova minnow, is a species of freshwater ray-finned fish belonging to the family Leuciscidae, which includes the daces, minnows and related fishes. This species is endemic to Croatia.

== Taxonomy ==
Delminichthys jadovensis was first formally described as Phoxinellus jadovensis in 2002 by Primož Zupančič and Nina Gidalevna Bogutskaya with its type locality given as the Jadova River at Ploče in Croatia. In 2006 Jörg Freyhof, Dietmar Lieckfeldt, Nina Bogutskaya, Christian Pitra and Arne Ludwig proposed the new genus Delminichthys for the monophyletic clade of four species of Balkan minnows which shared a number of characteristics and were more closely related to the genus Pseudophoxinus, which included this species. The genus Delminichthys is classified within the subfamily Leuciscinae of the family Leuciscidae.

== Etymology ==
Delminichthys jadovensis belongs to the genus Delminichthys, this name suffixes the Greek word for fish, -ichthys, onto the name Delminium, the Roman capital of Dalmatia in Croatia, the country in which all the species in the genus occur. The specific name, jadovensis, refers to the type locality, the Jadova River near Ploče in Croatia.

== Identification ==
Delminichthys jadovensis can be distinguished from the other members of the genus Delminichthys by having a moderately slender, conical snout and a terminal mouth. The body is completely covered in very small scales which are widely spaced on the belly and back. The scales are deeply embedded in the skin and, in adults the skin is thickened, particularly in the breeding season when it may obscure the scales. There are between 51 and 60 large pored scales in the lateral line, which may be interrupted but typically extends as far as the caudal peduncle. This species has a maximum standard length of 9.3 cm (3.7 in).

== Distribution and habitat ==
Delminichthys jadovensis is endemic to the upper catchment of the Lika River in Lika-Senj County in Croatia, where it is only known from the middle and upper reaches of the drainage system of the Jadova River, a tributary of the Lika. It lives in slow flowing streams with clear water.

== Biology ==
Delminichthys jadovensis often move from the open water of stream into subterranean streams and springs in areas of karst topography or hide in the mud during the winter. They may move back to the surface streams as the water level rises in the Autumn>

== Conservation ==
Delminichthys jadovensis is classified as Critically endangered by the International Union for Conservation of Nature, which describes the threats to this species as water abstraction, dams and the introduction of non-native fishes.

== Sources ==
- Froese, Rainer; Pauly, Daniel (eds.). "Delminichthys jadovensis". FishBase. August 2011 version.
