= Mirogrex hulensis =

Conservation status
- Extinct (1975) (IUCN 3.1)

Scientific classification
- Kingdom: Animalia
- Phylum: Chordata
- Class: Actinopterygii
- Division: Teleostei
- Order: Cypriniformes
- Family: Leuciscidae
- Subfamily: Leuciscinae
- Genus: Mirogrex
- Species: †M. hulensis

Binomial name
- †Mirogrex hulensis (Goren, Fishelson & Trewavas, 1973)

Synonyms
- Acanthobrama hulensis (Goren, Fishelson & Trewavas, 1973); Mirogrex terraesanctae hulensis Goren, Fishelson & Trewavas, 1973

Extinct species of fish

Mirogrex hulensis, sometimes known as the Hula bream, was a species of ray-finned fish in the family Leuciscidae. Its natural habitats were swamps and freshwater lakes in Lake Hula in northern Israel. Mirogrex hulensis looked much like a sardine. In Israel other members of the genus often are called "sardin" in culinary terms.

The deliberate draining of Lake Hula in the 1950s led to the extinction of this species, along with the cichlid fish Tristramella intermedia. The Hula painted frog was believed to be extinct until a female specimen was found in 2011. Mirogrex hulensis was last recorded in 1975.

== Description ==
This species had a maximum length of 23 centimetres (9.1 in) and was a bottom feeder with a diet of mollusks and zoobenthos. They spawned from February to April externally.

== See also ==
- List of extinct animals of Asia
