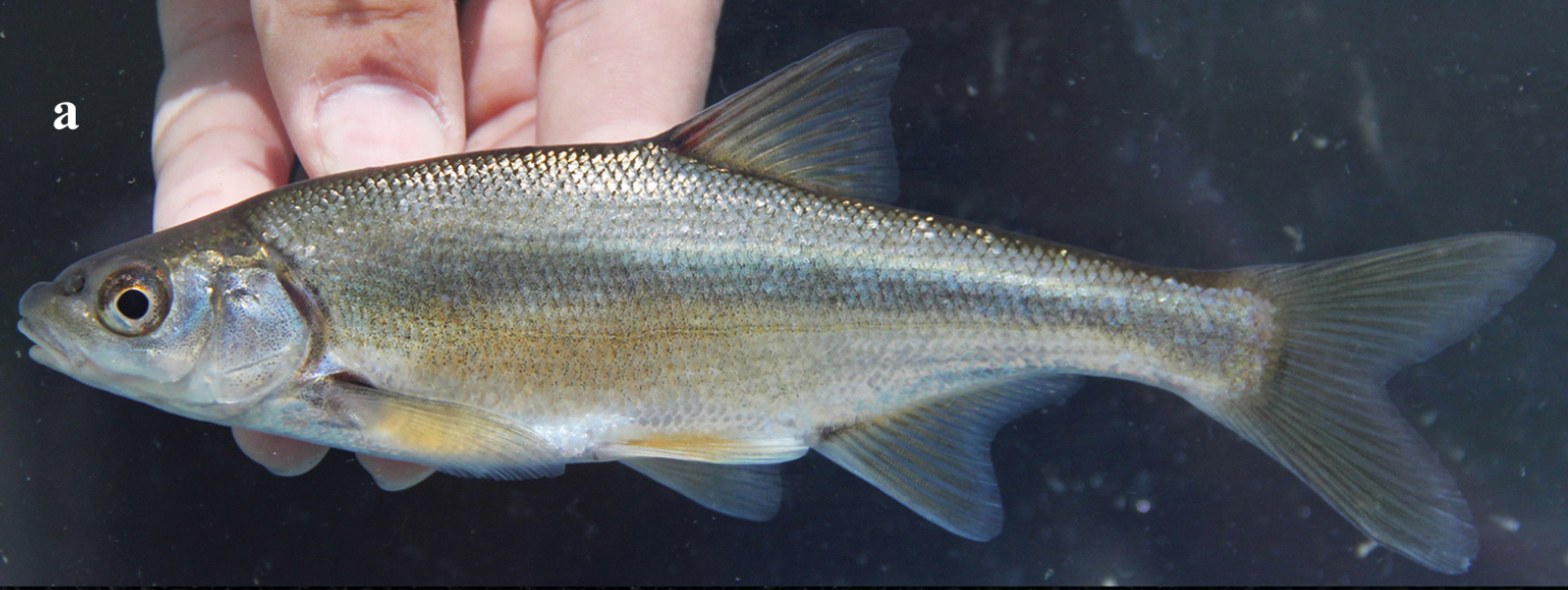

Conservation status
- Least Concern (IUCN 3.1)

Scientific classification
- Kingdom: Animalia
- Phylum: Chordata
- Class: Actinopterygii
- Order: Cypriniformes
- Family: Leuciscidae
- Subfamily: Leuciscinae
- Genus: Acanthobrama
- Species: A. microlepis

Binomial name
- Acanthobrama microlepis (De Filippi, 1863)

Synonyms
- Abramis microlepis De Filippi, 1863; Acanthalburnus microlepis (De Filippi, 1863)

= Acanthobrama microlepis =

Species of fish

Acanthobrama microlepis, called the blackbrow bleak or the Caucasian bream, is a species of freshwater fish in the family Leuciscidae. It reaches a maximum size of 25 cm (9.8 in) TL. The species is found in lakes and rivers of the southwestern Caspian Sea drainage basin, including Sefīd-Rūd, Kura River and Aras River. It has also been introduced to Iraq.

It is an ubiquitous species, which inhabits all kinds of freshwater bodies "with standing or slowly flowing waters as larger streams, rivers, reservoirs and lakes". Hydroelectric exploitation of the river systems does not seem to have impacted this species. Populations are in decline in Iran. The species is locally fished, but commands a low price, and is rarely a targeted species.
