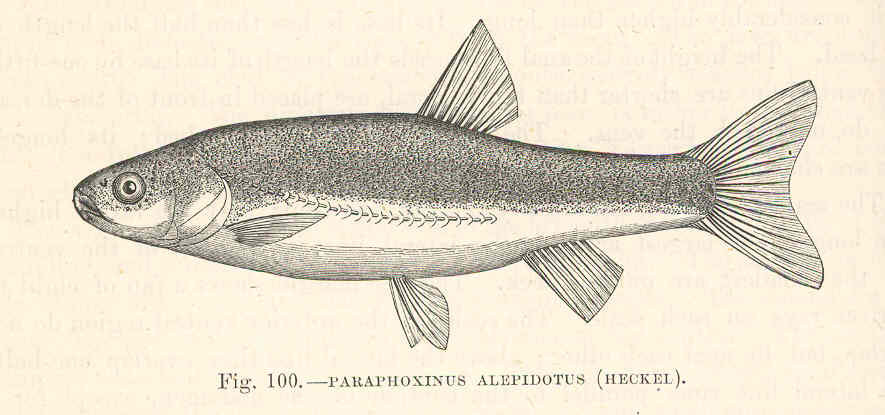

Conservation status
- Endangered (IUCN 3.1)

Scientific classification
- Kingdom: Animalia
- Phylum: Chordata
- Class: Actinopterygii
- Division: Teleostei
- Order: Cypriniformes
- Family: Leuciscidae
- Genus: Phoxinellus
- Species: P. alepidotus

Binomial name
- Phoxinellus alepidotus Heckel, 1843

Synonyms
- Paraphoxinus alepidotus (Heckel, 1843))

= Phoxinellus alepidotus =

Species of fish

Phoxinellus alepidotus, the Dinaric minnow, is a species of freshwater ray-finned fish belonging to the family Leuciscidae, which includes the daces, Eurasian minnows and related species. This species is found in Southeastern Europe, in the Western Balkans.

== Taxonomy ==
Phoxinellus alepidotus was first formally described in 1843 by the Austrian ichthyologist Johann Jakob Heckel with its type locality given as Livno in Bosnia and Herzegovina. This species is the type species of the genus Phoxinellus, being designated as the type species ny Pieter Bleeker in 1859 or 1860. The genus Phoxineluus is classified within the subfamily Leuciscinae of the family Leuciscidae.

== Etymology ==
Phoxinellus alepidotus is the type species of the genus Phoxinellus, this name is a diminutive of Phoxinus, the genus of the "true" Eurasian minnows. It is thought that Heckel may have coined this name due to the small size of P. alepidotus when compared to Cyprinus phoxinus. The specific name, alepidotus, means "without scales", a reference to the absence of scales on the body of these fishes, apart from those along the lateral line.

== Description ==
Phoxinellus alepidotus has an elongated body with a maximum standard length of 14.5 cm (5.7 in). The body is absent scales except along the length of the lateral line of between 11 and 42 pored scales. The lateral line ends between the pelvic and anal fins. The mouth is subterminal and the caudal fin is forked.

== Distribution and habitat ==
Phoxinellus alepidotus is found in the Western Balkans in Southeastern Europe where it is found in Bosnia and Herzegovina and Croatia. It is only found in the drainage system of the Cetina in the Dinaric Karst. In Bosnia and Herzegovina, has been recorded in Grahovsko, Livanjsko, Glamočko and Duvanjsko poljes, these drain to the Cetina via underground karstic conduits. This species has also been introduced to Lake Blidinje, which sits in an isolated upland plateau in the basin of the Duvanjsko polje basin, and to the upper Unac River, a tributary of the Danube. It has only been reported from two small lakes in Croatia, these are Miloševo and Stipančevo in the Hrvatačko polje. These lakes are located next to one another and when flooded they merge into a single wetland. This species is found in lowland water bodies, in clear streams and in the winter and during droughts they will move into underground karstic waters.

== Conservation ==
Phoxinellus alepidotus is classified as Endangered by the International Union for Conservation of Nature. It has a restricted range and its habitat is being degraded by many anthropogenic factors including pollution, damming, water abstraction and non-native invasive species.
