= Acanthobrama urmianus =

Conservation status
- Data Deficient (IUCN 3.1)

Scientific classification
- Kingdom: Animalia
- Phylum: Chordata
- Class: Actinopterygii
- Order: Cypriniformes
- Family: Leuciscidae
- Subfamily: Leuciscinae
- Genus: Acanthobrama
- Species: A. urmianus

Binomial name
- Acanthobrama urmianus Günther, 1899

Species of fish

Acanthobrama urmianus, the Urmia bream, is a species of freshwater ray-finned fish belonging to the family Leuciscidae. This species is endemic to the Urmia Lake basin of Iran.
