= Acanthobrama centisquama =

Conservation status
- Extinct (IUCN 3.1)

Scientific classification
- Kingdom: Animalia
- Phylum: Chordata
- Class: Actinopterygii
- Order: Cypriniformes
- Family: Leuciscidae
- Genus: Acanthobrama
- Species: †A. centisquama

Binomial name
- †Acanthobrama centisquama Heckel, 1843

Extinct species of ray-finned fish

Acanthobrama centisquama, also known as the long-spine bream or Orontes bream, is an extinct species of freshwater fish in the family Leuciscidae. It is known from Syria and Turkey, and there restricted to Lake Amik and al-Gab Lake. Lake Amik has been drained, and this species has not been found there since the early 20th century, nor in Gölbaşı Lake, which is impacted by pollution and water abstraction.
