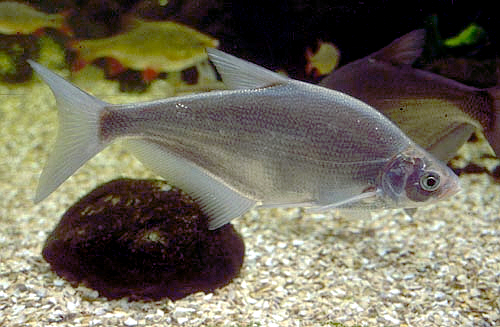

Conservation status
- Least Concern (IUCN 3.1)

Scientific classification
- Kingdom: Animalia
- Phylum: Chordata
- Class: Actinopterygii
- Division: Teleostei
- Order: Cypriniformes
- Family: Leuciscidae
- Subfamily: Leuciscinae
- Genus: Ballerus
- Species: B. ballerus

Binomial name
- Ballerus ballerus (Linnaeus, 1758)

Synonyms
- Cyprinus ballerus Linnaeus, 1758; Abramis ballerus (Linnaeus, 1758); Cyprinus farenus Linnaeus, 1758

= Ballerus ballerus =

Species of ray-finned fish

Ballerus ballerus, also known as the zope or the blue bream, is a species of freshwater ray-finned fish belonging to the family Leuciscidae. This species occurs in Europe and Western Asia.

== Description ==
Ballerus ballerus is one of the more streamlined breams, with a more laterally compressed body (especially towards the tail) and an upturned mouth. The eye is small It has small scales and the lateral line consists of 67–75 scales. It is a pale silvery colour with either pale yellowish or colourless fins. They are normally 25–35 cm (9.8–13.8 in) in length but occasionally can be up to 40 cm (16 in). The maximum published weight is 1.1 kg (2 lb 7 oz), although the largest rod caught fish, caught in Slovakia, weighed 2.2 kg (4 lb 14 oz) and measured 53 cm (21 in) in length. The males develop nuptial tubercles above the anal fin during the spring spawning season.

== Distribution ==
Ballerus ballerus is found in the large lowland rivers draining to the Baltic Sea, although it is not found in northern Sweden and Finland north of 62°N; the Weser and Elbe draining into the North Sea; the Black Sea; the Don draining into the Sea of Azov; and the Volga and Ural which drain into the Caspian Sea, although it is rare in the Ural River. Its range spans from the Netherlands in the west to Russia and Georgia in the east.

== Habitat and ecology ==
Ballerus ballerus is occurs in large lowland rivers and eutrophic lakes where it feeds on plankton which it catches close to the surface. It spawns in Spring, once the ice has thawed, in shallow reedy bays onto the vegetation and the young fish stay in these areas although the adults move into open water to feed. Spawning has been recorded on gravel in areas of moderate current. This species lives for over 10 years and it breeds for the first time at 3–4 years when they have attained a standard length of 150 mm (5.9 in). Spawning is initiated when the water temperature reaches 10 °C (50 °F) and usually lasts for only 1–2 weeks. The females spawn once a year while the males often defend spawning territories along the shoreline. It is known in some areas to migrate long distances to find suitable areas to spawn in. In some regions it will venture into the fresher parts of seas to find food.
