= Ladigesocypris mermere =

Conservation status
- Data Deficient (IUCN 3.1)

Scientific classification
- Kingdom: Animalia
- Phylum: Chordata
- Class: Actinopterygii
- Order: Cypriniformes
- Family: Leuciscidae
- Subfamily: Leuciscinae
- Genus: Ladigesocypris
- Species: L. mermere

Binomial name
- Ladigesocypris mermere (Ladiges, 1960)

Synonyms
- Leucaspius irideus mermere Ladiges, 1960; Pseudophoxinus mermere (Ladiges 1960)

Species of fish

Ladigesocypris mermere, also known as the Izmir minnow, is a species of freshwater ray-finned fish belonging to the family Leuciscidae. It is found only in Turkey. Its natural habitats are rivers, intermittent rivers, and freshwater springs. It is threatened by habitat loss.
