= Albanian roach =

Albanian roach is a common name for several fish in the family Cyprinidae and may refer to:

- Pachychilon pictum
- Leucos basak
