= Orthroleucos =

Conservation status
- Critically Endangered (IUCN 3.1)

Scientific classification
- Kingdom: Animalia
- Phylum: Chordata
- Class: Actinopterygii
- Order: Cypriniformes
- Family: Leuciscidae
- Subfamily: Leuciscinae
- Genus: Orthroleucos; Derjavin, 1937
- Species: O. atropatenus

Binomial name
- Orthroleucos atropatenus Derjavin, 1937

Synonyms
- Rutilus atropatenus Derjavin, 1937; Pseudophoxinus atropatenus (Derjavin, 1937)

Species of fish

Orthroleucos is a monospecific genus of freshwater ray-finned fish belonging to the family Leuciscidae, which includes the daces, Eurasian minnows and related species. The only species in the genus is Orthroleucos atropatenus, also known as the Azerbaijani spring roach or Shirvan roachling. This species is endemic to Azerbaijan.

It is only found in the Kura River drainage in Azerbaijan, inhabiting small spring lakes in an area of max. 44 km (27 mi) diameter.
