= Pachychilon macedonicum =

Conservation status
- Least Concern (IUCN 3.1)

Scientific classification
- Kingdom: Animalia
- Phylum: Chordata
- Class: Actinopterygii
- Order: Cypriniformes
- Family: Leuciscidae
- Subfamily: Leuciscinae
- Genus: Pachychilon
- Species: P. macedonicum

Binomial name
- Pachychilon macedonicum (Steindachner, 1892)

Synonyms
- Leuciscus macedonicus Steindachner, 1892; Rutilus macedonicus (Steindachner, 1892)

Species of fish

Pachychilon macedonicum, the Macedonian roach or Macedonian moranec, is a species of freshwater ray-finned fish belonging to the family Leuciscidae, which includes the daces, Eurasian minnows and related species. This species is found in Greece and North Macedonia.

== Taxonomy ==
Pachychilon macedonium was first formally described as Leuciscus (Leucos) macedonicus in 1892 by the Austrian ichthyologist Franz Steindachner with its type locality given as Lake Dojran in North Macedonia. It is now classified as a valid species in the genus Pachychilon within the subfamily Leuciscinae of the family Leuciscidae.

== Etymology ==
Pachychilon macedonium is a member of the genus Pachychilon a name which combine pachys, meaning thick, with chilon, a latinisation of cheilos, which means lips, a reference to the thick lips of the fishes in this genus. The specific name, macedonicus, means belonging to Macedonia.

== Description ==
Pachychilon macedonium is distinguished from P. pictum by the possession of the thick black stripe running along the sides from the tip of the snout to the base of the caudal fin, separating the dark brown back from the silvery belly. There is an ellipsoid black blotch on the caudal peduncle. These markings are clearer in preserved specimens. The lateral line has between 35 and 39 scales and there are 8 1/2 branched rays in the anal fin. This species has a maximum standard length of 12 cm (4.7 in).

== Distribution and habitat ==
Pachychilon macedonium is found in river systems draining into the northwestern Aegean Sea from the Pineios in Thessaly to the Gallikos in Central Macedonia, including lakes such as Doiran, Vegoritida, Petron and Chimaditida. In the Vardar the Macedonian roach extends into North Macedonia. There is an apparently introduced population in a stream draining into Lake Koroneia, close to the Gallikos. This is a shoaling species of lowland rivers, freshwater lakes and marshes, and it has become established in some reservoirs and canal systems.
