= Delminichthys =

Scientific classification
- Kingdom: Animalia
- Phylum: Chordata
- Class: Actinopterygii
- Division: Teleostei
- Order: Cypriniformes
- Family: Leuciscidae
- Subfamily: Leuciscinae
- Genus: Delminichthys; Freyhof, Lieckfeldt, Bogutskaya, Pitra & Ludwig, 2006

Type species
- Leucos adspersus Heckel, 1843

Genus of fishes

Delminichthys is a genus of freshwater ray-finned fishes belonging to the family Leuciscidae. The fishes in this genus are found in the karst region of the Balkans, Eastern Europe. Until 2006 it was considered part of the genus Phoxinellus. It currently contains four species.

== Species ==
Delminichthys contains the following species:

- Delminichthys adspersus (Heckel, 1843) (Spotted minnow)
- Delminichthys ghetaldii (Steindachner, 1882) (Southern Dalmatian minnow)
- Delminichthys jadovensis (Zupančič & Bogutskaya, 2002) (Jadova minnow)
- Delminichthys krbavensis (Zupančič & Bogutskaya, 2002) (Krbava minnow)
