= Ladigesocypris =

Scientific classification
- Kingdom: Animalia
- Phylum: Chordata
- Class: Actinopterygii
- Order: Cypriniformes
- Family: Leuciscidae
- Subfamily: Leuciscinae
- Genus: Ladigesocypris; Karaman, 1972

Type species
- Leucaspius ghigii Gianferrari, 1927

Genus of fishes

Ladigesocypris is a small genus of freshwater ray-finned fish belonging to the family Leuciscidae.The fishes in this genus are found in Anatolia and on the island of Rhodes in Greece.

== Species ==
The species included in this genus are:

- Ladigesocypris ghigii (Gianferrari, 1927) (Rhodes minnow)
- Ladigesocypris mermere (Ladiges, 1960) (Izmir minnow)
