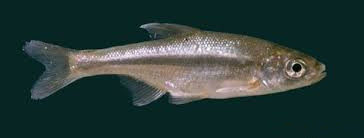
- Acanthobrama telavivensis

Scientific classification
- Domain: Eukaryota
- Kingdom: Animalia
- Phylum: Chordata
- Class: Actinopterygii
- Order: Cypriniformes
- Family: Leuciscidae
- Subfamily: Leuciscinae
- Genus: Acanthobrama; Heckel, 1843

Type species
- Acanthobrama marmid Heckel, 1843

Species
- see text.

Synonyms
- Acanthalburnus Berg, 1916; Culticula Abbott, 1901

= Acanthobrama =

Genus of fishes

Acanthobrama is a genus of ray-finned fish in the family Leuciscidae found mostly in the Near East.

== Species ==
Acanthobrama contains the following species:

- Acanthobrama centisquama Heckel, 1843
- Acanthobrama hadiyahensis Coad, Alkahem & Behnke, 1983
- Acanthobrama lissneri Tortonese, 1952
- Acanthobrama marmid Heckel, 1843
- Acanthobrama microlepis (De Filippi, 1863)
- Acanthobrama orontis (Berg, 1949)
- Acanthobrama persidis (Coad, 1981)
- Acanthobrama telavivensis Goren, Fishelson & Trewavas, 1973
- Acanthobrama thisbeae Freyhof & Özulug, 2014
- Acanthobrama tricolor Lortet, 1883
- Acanthobrama urmianus (Günther, 1899)
