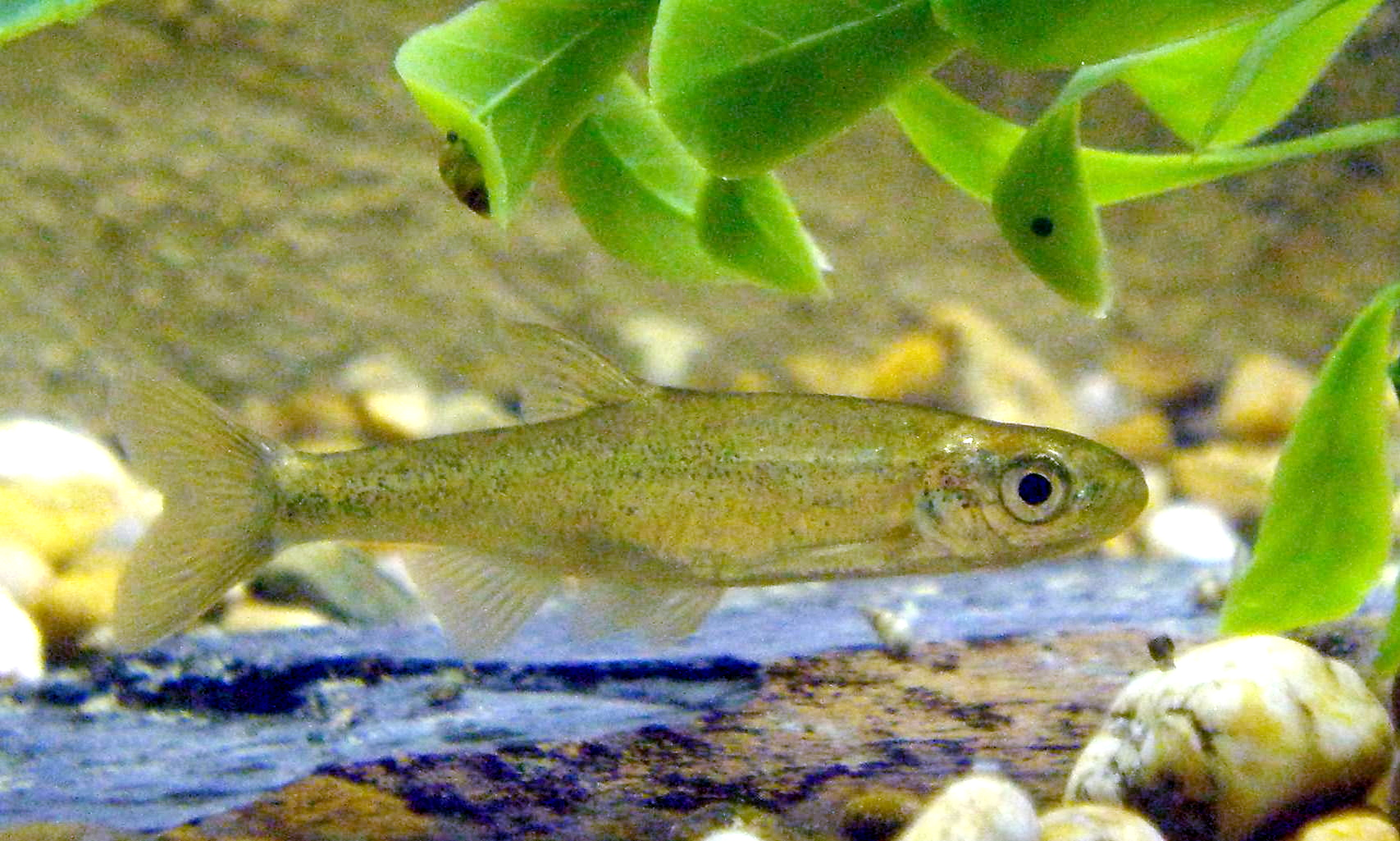
- Anaecypris hispanica

Scientific classification
- Kingdom: Animalia
- Phylum: Chordata
- Class: Actinopterygii
- Division: Teleostei
- Order: Cypriniformes
- Family: Leuciscidae
- Subfamily: Leuciscinae
- Genus: Anaecypris; Collares-Pereira, 1983

Type species
- Phoxinus hispanicus Steindachner, 1866

= Anaecypris =

Genus of fishes

Anaecypris, also called the Spanish minnowcarps, is a genus of freshwater ray-finned fish belonging to the family Leuciscidae, the family which includes the daces, bleaks and minnows. The fishes in this genus are found in the Iberian Peninsula and North Africa.

== Species ==
Anaecypris contains the following species:

- Anaecypris hispanica Steindachner, 1866 (Spanish minnowcarp)
- Anaecypris punica Pellegrin, 1920
