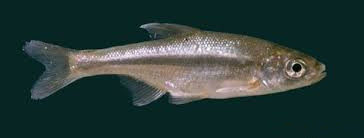

Conservation status
- Vulnerable (IUCN 3.1)

Scientific classification
- Kingdom: Animalia
- Phylum: Chordata
- Class: Actinopterygii
- Order: Cypriniformes
- Family: Leuciscidae
- Genus: Acanthobrama
- Species: A. telavivensis

Binomial name
- Acanthobrama telavivensis Goren, Fishelson & Trewavas, 1973

= Acanthobrama telavivensis =

Species of fish

Acanthobrama telavivensis, commonly known as the Yarkon bream or Yarkon bleak, is a species of freshwater ray-finned fish of the family Leuciscidae found only in Israel, in the Yarkon River system.

== Description ==
The silver fish, which grows to a length of 20 centimetres (7.9 in), was reintroduced to the Afek springs and Ein Nymphit by the Israel Nature Preservation Authority.

== History ==
Throughout 1950 to 1970, there was a very sharp decline in the species's population. The population was stable until a drought in 1999 which made it near-extinct. The remaining individuals were taken and bred in captivity. In 2006, these fish were re-introduced to 12 rehabilitated sites in its previous range. Since then, large populations of various sizes and ages have been found in these areas. According to the authority's chief ecologist, this shows that efforts to rehabilitate the river have succeeded. Yarkon bleak preservation efforts began in 1999, when the population dropped to only a few hundred. The project was a joint endeavour of the Yarkon River Authority, Tel Aviv University and the Israel Nature and National Parks Authority. The fish were transferred to special breeding pools at the university's zoological park, and an attempt was made to reintroduce them to the river in 2002 with little success. The scientists involved believed that this was because of a lack of suitable spawning sites; they built a pond filled with gravel and vegetation and soon there were many juvenile fish seen. In 2005, a second attempt to reintroduce them to the upper part of the river was reportedly more successful, following engineering to create suitable spawning sites. In 2014, the IUCN declared this species sufficiently 'wild' (i.e. no direct intervention) to remove it from its "Extinct in the Wild" category, and it is now considered "Vulnerable".
