= Mirogrex =

Scientific classification
- Kingdom: Animalia
- Phylum: Chordata
- Class: Actinopterygii
- Order: Cypriniformes
- Family: Leuciscidae
- Subfamily: Leuciscinae
- Genus: Mirogrex; Goren, Fishelson & Trewavas, 1973

Type species
- Acanthobrama terraesanctae Steinitz, 1952

Species
- see text.

Genus of fishes

Mirogrex is a genus of ray-finned fish belonging to the family Leuciscidae, which includes the daces, Eurasian minnows and related fishes. The fishes in this genus are found only in Israel and Syria.

== Species ==
Mirogrex contains the following species:

- †Mirogrex hulensis Goren, Fishelson & Trewavas, 1973 (Hula bream)
- Mirogrex terraesanctae (Steinitz, 1952) (Kinneret bleak)
