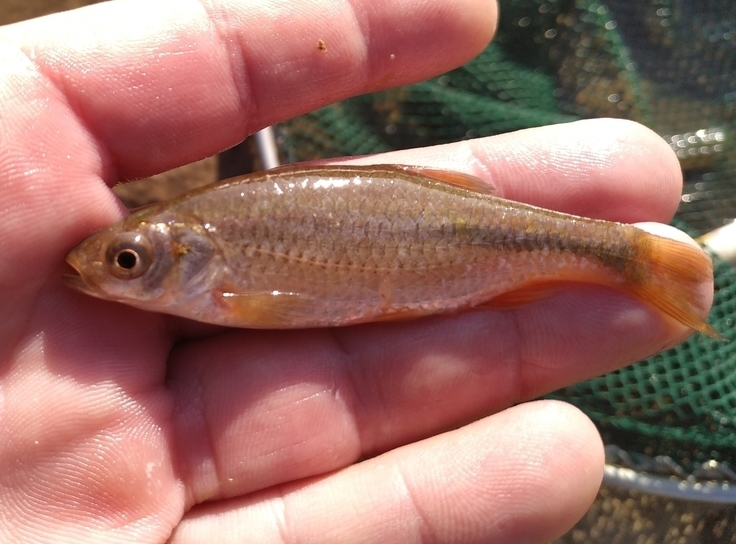
- Black Sea Chub (Petroleuciscus borysthenicus)

Scientific classification
- Kingdom: Animalia
- Phylum: Chordata
- Class: Actinopterygii
- Order: Cypriniformes
- Family: Leuciscidae
- Subfamily: Leuciscinae
- Genus: Petroleuciscus; Bogutskaya, 2002

Type species
- Squalius borysthenicus Kessler, 1859

= Petroleuciscus =

Genus of fishes

Petroleuciscus is a genus of freshwater ray-finned fish belonging to the family Leuciscidae, which includes the daces, Eurasian minnows and related fishes. It was usually included in Leuciscus until recently. This genus unites the Ponto-Caspian chubs and daces. Recent research has indicated that Petroleuciscus esfahani is probably a synonym of Alburnus doriae.

== Species ==
The genus Petroleuciscus contains the following valid species:

- Petroleuciscus aphipsi (Aleksandrov, 1927) (Aphips chub)
- Petroleuciscus borysthenicus (Kessler, 1859) (Dnieper chub)
- Petroleuciscus ninae Turan, Kalayci, Kaya, Bektaş & Küçük, 2018
- Petroleuciscus smyrnaeus (Boulenger, 1896) (Izmir chub)
- Petroleuciscus squaliusculus (Kessler, 1872) (Syr-darya dace)
