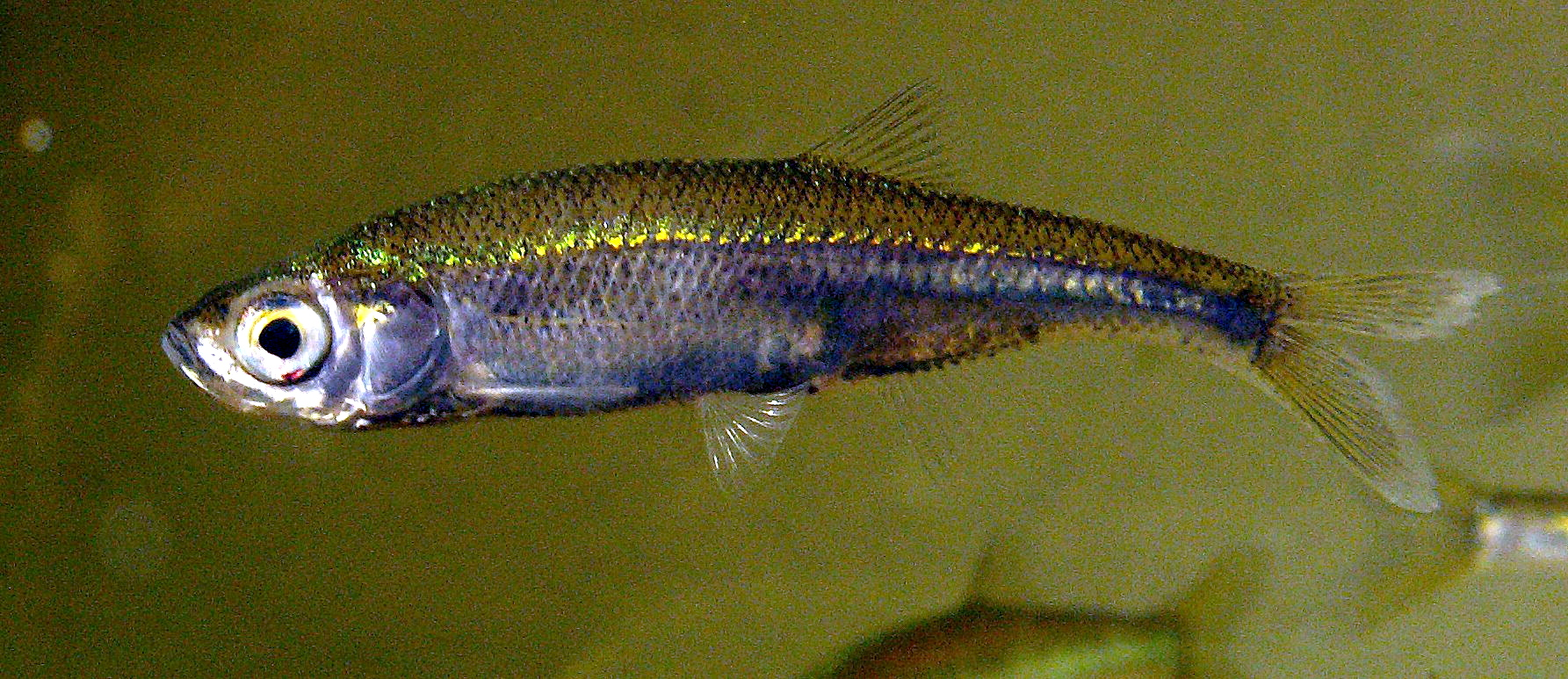

Conservation status
- Least Concern (IUCN 3.1)

Scientific classification
- Kingdom: Animalia
- Phylum: Chordata
- Class: Actinopterygii
- Order: Cypriniformes
- Family: Leuciscidae
- Subfamily: Leuciscinae
- Genus: Leucaspius; Heckel & Kner, 1858
- Species: L. delineatus

Binomial name
- Leucaspius delineatus Heckel, 1843

Synonyms
- Squalius delineatus Heckel, 1843; Aspius ovsianka Czernay, 1851; Leucaspius abruptus Heckel & Kner, 1857; Leuciscus pigmeus Platera, 1861; Owsianka czernayi Dybowski, 1862; Leucaspius relictus Warpachowski, 1889; Leucaspius delineatus var. dimorphus Ruzsky, 1914; Phoxinellus thracicus Battalgil, 1942

= Leucaspius =

Species of fish

Leucaspius is a monospecific genus of ray-finned fish belonging to the subfamily Leuciscinae, of the family Leuciscidae. The only species in this genus is Leucaspius delineatus, known as the sunbleak, belica or moderlieschen. The species is found in Europe and Western Asia.

== Description ==
The belica is a slender fish with a tapered body which is usually from 4 to 6 cm (1.6 to 2.4 in) long and seldom grows larger than 10 cm (3.9 in). It has an upward-turned mouth and a short lateral line which extends about seven to ten scales from the gill cover. The anal fin is short and consists of eleven to fourteen rays. This is a silvery fish with a particularly intense band of colour running along the flank.

== Distribution ==
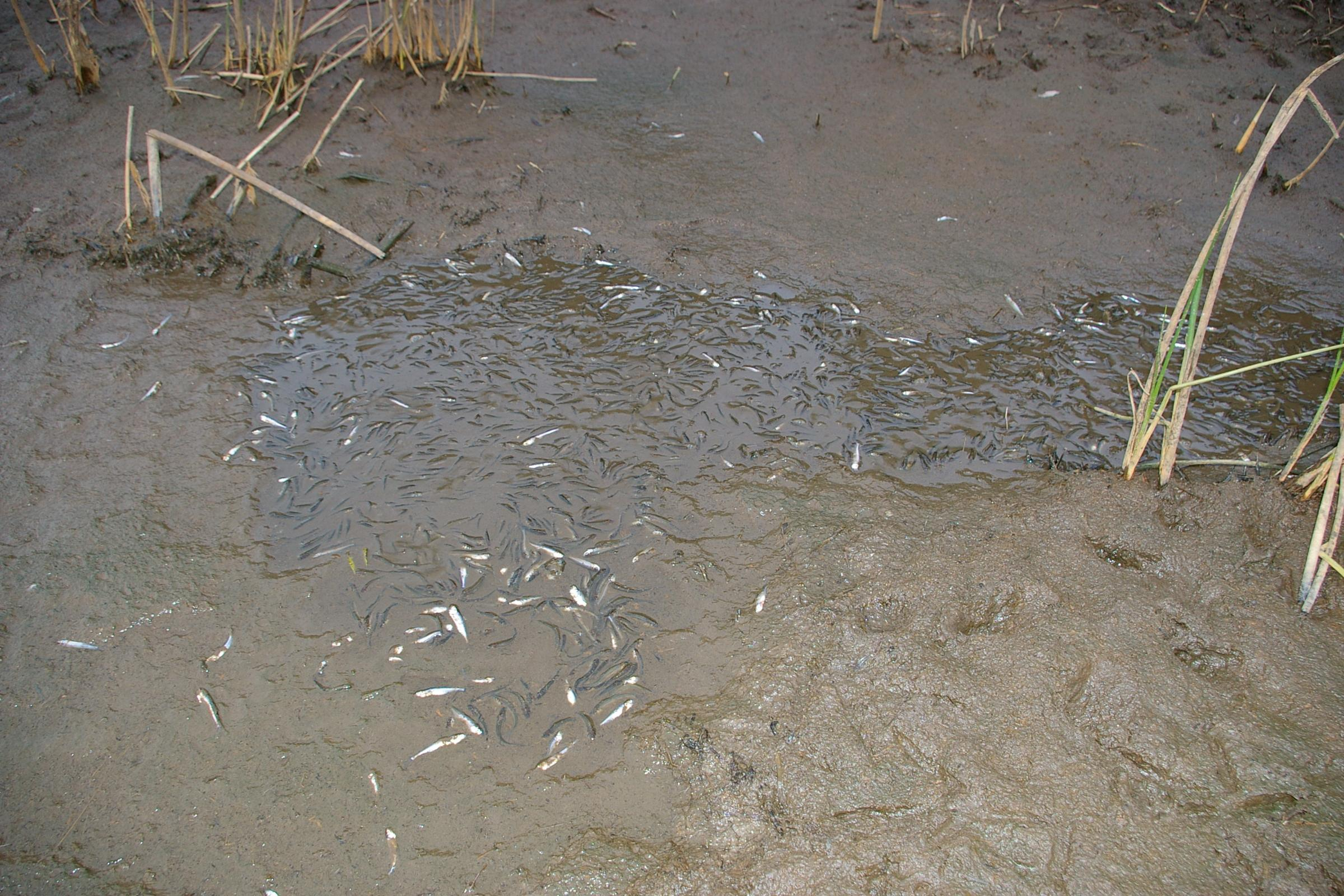
"Motherless" juvenile fish in a drying-out ephemeral pond

The belica is found all over temperate continental Europe and barely extends to Central Asia in the Caucasus region. The southern limits of its range are essentially marked by the Pyrenees and the Alpide belt.

The common name Moderlieschen is of German origin. Although it looks like a proper word that can be approximately transliterated as "mouldy Lizzy", it is actually a bowdlerized version of an older name which survives in parts of Germany as Mutterloseken. Literally meaning "the little motherless one", this ultimately refers to the fact that the sticky eggs of the moderlieschen can withstand exposure to air for a remarkably long time. Deposited on water plants, they sometimes stick to the feet of ducks and similar birds and are carried by these to ephemeral ponds. Large numbers of young moderlieschens are thus sometimes encountered when such ponds dry up, and with no adult fish being present this gave rise to the belief that they were "motherless".

It has been introduced to Great Britain, and appears to be established in the Avalon Marshes in Somerset and has been implicated in transmitting a new species of parasitic fluke to both European otter and American mink in the area but where it may now be an important prey species for piscivorous birds.

== See also ==
- Abiogenesis
