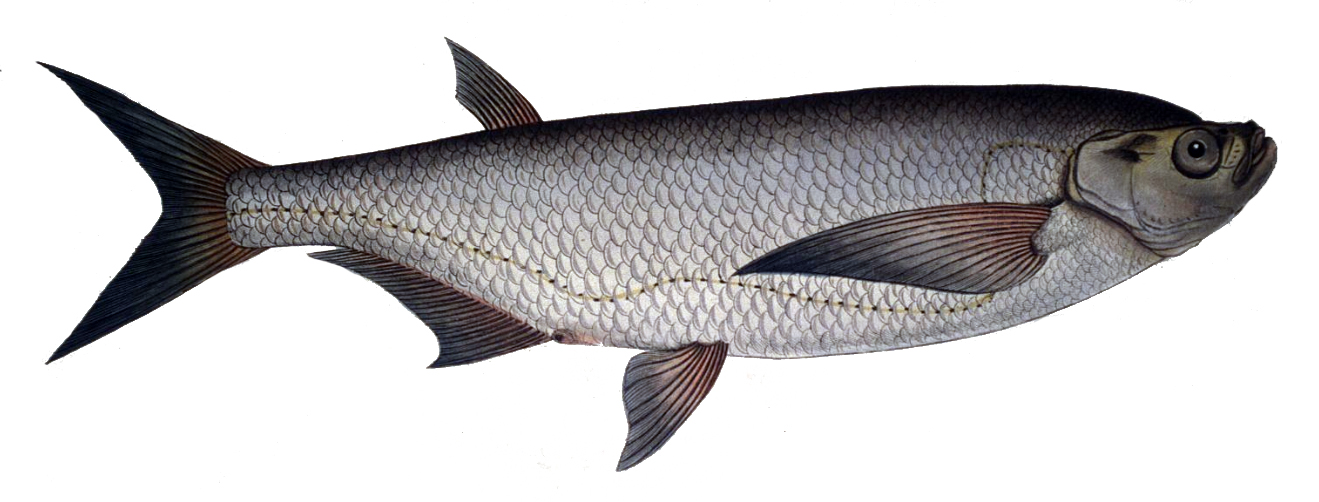

Conservation status
- Least Concern (IUCN 3.1)

Scientific classification
- Kingdom: Animalia
- Phylum: Chordata
- Class: Actinopterygii
- Division: Teleostei
- Order: Cypriniformes
- Family: Leuciscidae
- Subfamily: Leuciscinae
- Genus: Pelecus; Agassiz, 1835
- Species: P. cultratus

Binomial name
- Pelecus cultratus (Linnaeus, 1758)

Synonyms
- Clupea ziga Wulff, 1765; Cyprinus cultratus Linnaeus, 1758

= Pelecus =

Species of fish

Pelecus is a monospecific genus of freshwater and brackish water ray-finned fish belonging to the family Leuciscidae, which includes the daces, Eurasian minnows and related species. The only species in the genus is Pelecus cultratus, commonly known as the ziege, sichel, sabre carp or sabrefish, A fish found in Eastern Europe and adjacent Asian regions, inhabiting the lower reaches of rivers and brackish waters in the eastern Baltic Sea, Black Sea, Caspian Sea and Aral Sea basins. The ziege having no major threats, the IUCN lists it as being of Least Concern.

== Description ==
The ziege resembles a large Baltic herring in appearance. It grows to about 25 to 40 cm (10 to 16 in) in length. It has a keel on its belly which from the side looks curved while the back is almost straight. It has an upturned snout and the tip of the lower jaw also slopes steeply upwards. The lateral line is wavy and very low down the flank. The pectoral fin is long and pointed. This is a pale, silvery fish with almost colourless fins.

== Distribution ==
The ziege can be found in waters of the Baltic states and Eastern Europe. It can also be found in other European and Asian countries such as Austria, Azerbaijan, Bulgaria, Croatia, Czech Republic, Denmark, Finland, Georgia, Germany, Hungary, Kazakhstan, Moldova, Poland, Romania, Russia, Serbia and Montenegro, Slovakia, Sweden, Norway Turkey, Turkmenistan, Ukraine, and Uzbekistan. It usually swims near the surface in estuaries and lakes, and some populations live permanently in rivers and streams.

== Biology ==
This fish feeds on zooplankton, swimming invertebrates such as crustaceans, small fish and floating insects. It breeds in May and June, travelling up-river to find suitable open water locations. It sometimes breeds in brackish water, for example in the Gulf of Finland. The eggs float, and in rivers, drift with the current. They hatch after about three to four days. After spawning, the migratory fish return to estuaries to feed.
