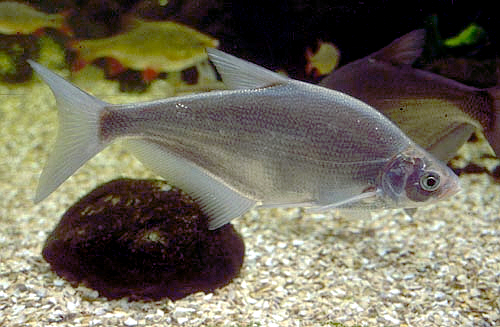
- Zope (Ballerus ballerus, the type species of the genus)

Scientific classification
- Kingdom: Animalia
- Phylum: Chordata
- Class: Actinopterygii
- Order: Cypriniformes
- Family: Leuciscidae
- Subfamily: Leuciscinae
- Genus: Ballerus; Heckel, 1843

Type species
- Ballerus ballerus (Linnaeus, 1758)

= Ballerus =

Genus of fishes

Ballerus is a genus of freshwater ray-finned fishes belonging to the family Leuciscidae. These fishes are found in Europe and Asia.

== Species ==
Ballerus contains the following species:

- Ballerus ballerus (Linnaeus, 1758) (Zope)
- Ballerus sapa (Pallas, 1814) (White-eye bream)
