= Andreas Ludwig Jeitteles =

Austrian physician, author and politician

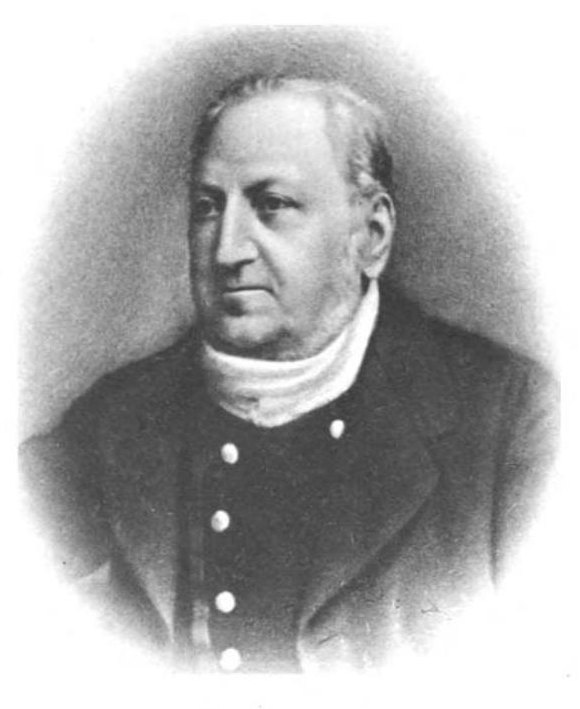
Andreas Ludwig Jeitteles (date unknown)

Andreas Ludwig Joseph Heinrich Jeitteles (Czech: Ondřej Ludvík Jeitteles; 23 October 1799 – 17 June 1878) was a Czech medical doctor, author of medical literature, journalist, politician, poet and writer. He wrote under the pseudonym Justus Frey.

== Biography ==
He was born on 23 October 1799 in Prague, Bohemia, as Aaron Jeitteles to a prominent Jewish family; established in Prague since at least 1615. His great-grandfather, Mischel Loeb (died 1763), was a physician and early promoter of variolation for smallpox. Aaron was a pupil of the philosopher, Bernard Bolzano, and a close friend of the playwright, Karl Egon Ebert, and the painter, Josef Führich.

He graduated from the primary schools of Prague at the age of fifteen, then studied medicine at Charles University. Later, he attended the University of Vienna, where he was awarded his Doctorate in 1825. In 1828, he converted to Christianity and was baptized as "Andreas Ludwig Joseph Heinrich". From 1829 to 1835, he was first a Proctor, then a Professor in the Department of Anatomy, Faculty of Medicine at the University in Vienna. After 1835, he was a professor at Palacký University Olomouc, where he became a Rector in 1842.

During the Revolution of 1848, he became involved as a liberal publicist and was elected as a representative to the Frankfurt Parliament. He was initially an independent, but soon became attached to the left-wing Centralmärzverein faction of Ludwig Feuerbach. Disappointed by his efforts to promote fundamental rights, he resigned in January, 1849. He returned to Olomouc, where he worked until 1869.

He had started writing poetry while still in high school. On the occasion of his centenary, his son published Gesammelte Dichtungen (Collected Poems), in the series Bibliothek der Deutschen Schriftstener aus Böhmen (Library of German Writers from Bohemia). His poems emphasized justice and freedom, hence the pseudonym, "Justus Frey". He also wrote "hymns" about Jan Hus and Jerome of Prague, criticizing what he called the "darkness" of the Catholic Church. In a later poem, Warnung, possibly expressing his own regrets, he advised young Jews to adhere to their ancient religion.

In the field of medical writing, he is perhaps best known for his new edition of Beschreibung des Ganzen Menschlichen Körpers (Description of the Entire Human Body) by Johann Christoph Andreas Mayer. In 1832, he began to promote the use of psychology in the diagnosis and treatment of disease.

He died on 17 June 1878 in Graz, Austria-Hungary. His son Ludwig Heinrich Jeitteles became a zoologist, prehistorian and teacher while another son Adalbert became a Germanist and librarian.
