= Leucalburnus =

Conservation status
- Least Concern (IUCN 3.1)

Scientific classification
- Kingdom: Animalia
- Phylum: Chordata
- Class: Actinopterygii
- Order: Cypriniformes
- Family: Leuciscidae
- Subfamily: Leuciscinae
- Genus: Leucalburnus; Berg, 1916
- Species: L. satunini

Binomial name
- Leucalburnus satunini (Berg, 1910)

Synonyms
- Phoxinus satunini Berg, 1910

Species of fish

Leucalburnus is a monospecific genus of ray-finned fish belonging to the subfamily Leuciscinae, its only species is Leucalburnus satunini, the mountain dace or White Kura bleak . This species is endemic to fast flowing mountain streams in a small high altitude plain in upper Kura drainage of eastern Turkey.

== Bibliography ==
- Froese, Rainer; Pauly, Daniel (eds.). "Leucalburnus satunini". FishBase. August 2011 version.
