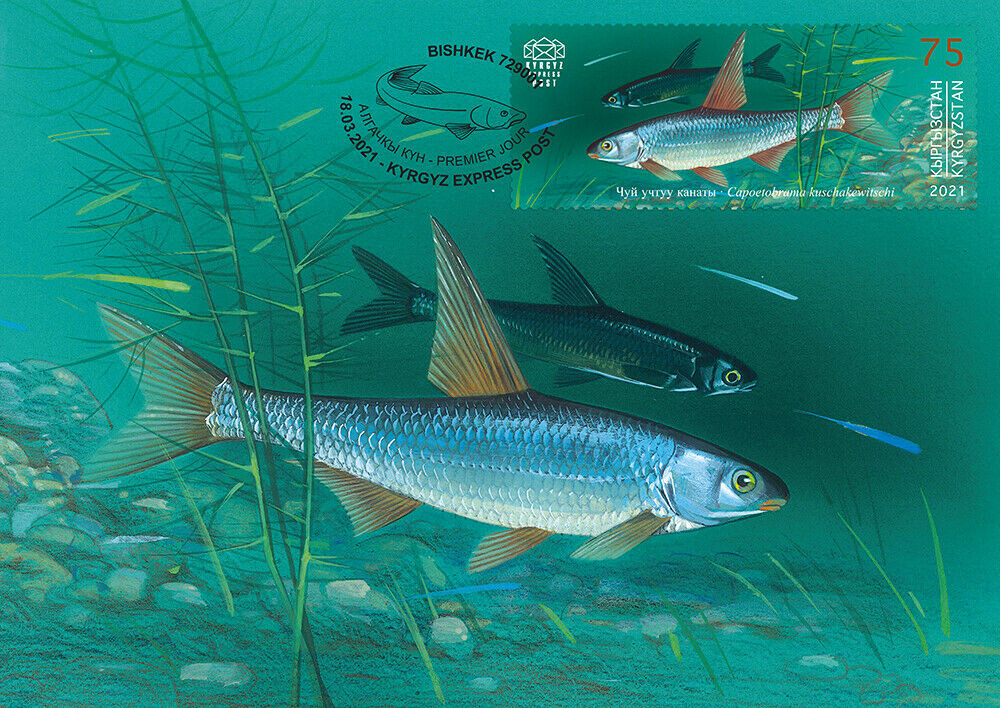

Conservation status
- Endangered (IUCN 3.1)

Scientific classification
- Kingdom: Animalia
- Phylum: Chordata
- Class: Actinopterygii
- Order: Cypriniformes
- Family: Leuciscidae
- Subfamily: Leuciscinae
- Genus: Capoetobrama; L. S. Berg, 1916
- Species: C. kuschakewitschi

Binomial name
- Capoetobrama kuschakewitschi (Kessler, 1872)

Synonyms
- Acanthobrama kuschakewitschi Kessler, 1872; Acanthobrama bogdanowi Kessler, 1877

= Capoetobrama =

Genus of fishes

Capoetobrama is a monospecific genus of freshwater ray-finned fish belonging to the family Leuciscidae. The only species in the genus is Capoetobrama kuschakewitschi, the sharpray, a species of freshwater fish that is found in Central Asia, in a region shared by Kazakhstan, Kyrgyzstan, Tajikistan, Turkmenistan and Uzbekistan. There are two recognized subspecies.

== Subspecies ==
- Capoetobrama kuschakewitschi kuschakewitschi (Kessler, 1872) (Sharpray)
- Capoetobrama kuschakewitschi orientalis A. M. Nikolskii, 1934 (Chu sharpray)
