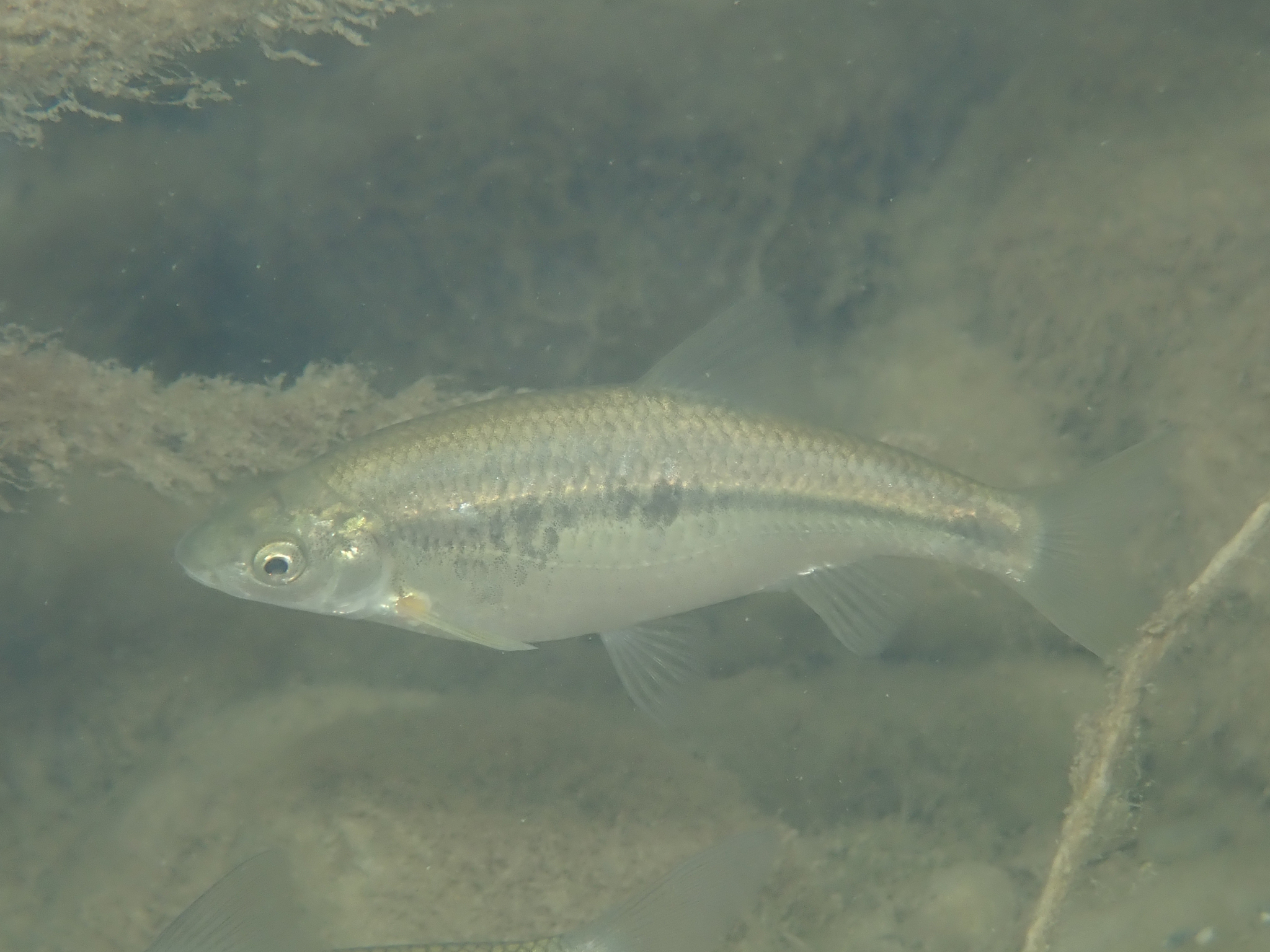
- Pachychilon pictum from France

Scientific classification
- Kingdom: Animalia
- Phylum: Chordata
- Class: Actinopterygii
- Order: Cypriniformes
- Family: Leuciscidae
- Subfamily: Leuciscinae
- Genus: Pachychilon; Steindachner, 1882

Type species
- Squalius pictus Heckel & Kner, 1858

= Pachychilon =

Genus of fishes

Pachychilon is a genus of freshwater ray-finned fish belonging to the family Leuciscidae, which includes the daces, Eurasian minnows and related fishes. The fishes in this genus are found in Europe.

== Species ==
Pachychilon contains the following species:

- Pachychilon macedonicum (Steindachner, 1892) (Macedonian roach)
- Pachychilon pictum (Heckel & Kner, 1858) (Albanian roach)
