= Tefenni nase =

Conservation status
- Endangered (IUCN 3.1)

Scientific classification
- Kingdom: Animalia
- Phylum: Chordata
- Class: Actinopterygii
- Order: Cypriniformes
- Family: Leuciscidae
- Subfamily: Leuciscinae
- Genus: Turcichondrostoma; Turan, Küçük, Güçlü & Aksu, 2021
- Species: T. fahirae

Binomial name
- Turcichondrostoma fahirae (Ladiges, 1960)

Synonyms
- Phoxinellus fahirae Ladiges, 1960; Pseudophoxinus fahirae (Ladiges, 1960); Chondrostoma fahirae (Ladiges, 1960)

Species of fish

The Tefenni nase or Tefenni minnow (Turcichondrostoma fahirae) is a species of ray-finned fish in the family Leuciscidae. It is found only in Turkey, where it has a distribution limited to the Kirkpinar spring in Karamusa village near Tefenni, Karatash Lake and Değirmendere stream flowing into Karamanlı Reservoir in wider Lake Burdur basin in Central Anatolia. Its natural habitats are rivers and intermittent rivers. It is threatened by habitat loss and was extirpated from the Kirkinpar spring, its type locality, and had to be reintroduced there with unknown success. The population in Değirmendere was discovered in the 21st century and its size is unknown.
