= Egirdira =

Conservation status
- Endangered (IUCN 3.1)

Scientific classification
- Kingdom: Animalia
- Phylum: Chordata
- Class: Actinopterygii
- Division: Teleostei
- Order: Cypriniformes
- Family: Leuciscidae
- Subfamily: Leuciscinae
- Genus: Egirdira; Freyhof, 2022
- Species: E. nigra

Binomial name
- Egirdira nigra (Kosswig, & Geldiay, 1952)

Synonyms
- Phoxinellus egridiri M. S. Karaman (sr), 1972; Pseudophoxinus egridiri (M. S. Karaman, 1972); Pararhodeus niger Kosswig & Geldiay, 1952

Species of fish

Egirdira is a monospecific genus of ray-finned fish belonging to the subfamily Leuciscinae of the family Leuciscidae, which includes the daces, Eurasian minnows and related species. Its only species is Egirdira nigra, or the yag baligi. It is found only in Turkey, in tributaries of Lake Egridir in Central Anatolia. It is considered an Endangered species (EN) since 2013, an improvement from Critically Endangered (CR) which was the status between 1996 and 2006.
