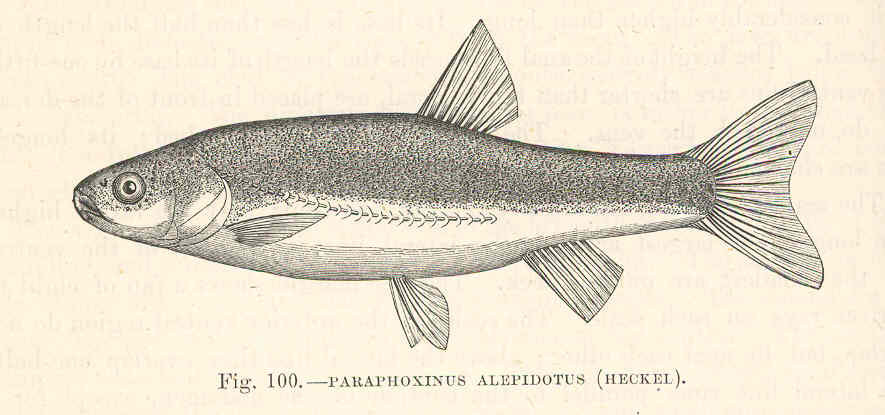
- Phoxinellus alepidotus

Scientific classification
- Kingdom: Animalia
- Phylum: Chordata
- Class: Actinopterygii
- Order: Cypriniformes
- Family: Leuciscidae
- Subfamily: Leuciscinae
- Genus: Phoxinellus; Heckel, 1843

Type species
- Phoxinellus alepidotus Heckel, 1843

Species
- See text

Synonyms
- Paraphoxinus Bleeker, 1863

= Phoxinellus =

Genus of fishes

Phoxinellus is a genus of freshwater ray-finned fish belonging to the family Leuciscidae, which includes the daces, Eurasian minnows and related species. These fishes are found in the Balkans.

== Taxonomy ==
Phoxinellus was first used as a genus name by the Austrian ichthyologist Johann Jakob Heckel in 1843 when he described Phoxinellus alepidotus, giving its type locality as Livno, Bosnia. In 1859 or 1860, Pieter Bleeker designated P. alepidotus as the type species of the genus. In 1863, Bleeker placed P. alpeidotis in the new genus Paraphoxinus, but this taxon is a synonym of Phoxinellus. Phoxinellus is classified within the subfamily Leuciscinae of the family Leuciscidae.

== Species ==
Phoxinellus contains the following species:

- Phoxinellus alepidotus Heckel, 1843 (Dinaric minnow)
- Phoxinellus dalmaticus Zupančič & Bogutskaya, 2000 (Dalmatian minnow)
- Phoxinellus pseudalepidotus Bogutskaya & Zupančič, 2003 (Mostar minnow)

== Etymology ==
Phoxinellus is a diminutive of Phoxinus, the genus of the "true" Eurasian minnows. It is thought that Heckel may have coined this name due to the small size of P. alepidotus compared to Cyprinus phoxinus.

== Characteristics ==
Phoxinellus species are small fishes with standard lengths that are typically less than 150 mm (5.9 in). They have 5 upper pharyngeal teeth and 4 or 4 lower pharyngeal teeth. The number of branched fin rays in the dorsal and anal fin is relatively low, at between 6 1/2 and 8 1/2, and there is no connection between sensory canals of the preoperculum and jaw with the one below the eyes.

== Distribution and habitat ==
Phoxinellus minnows are found in southeastern Europe, where they are endemic to the Balkans. They are found in karstic streams. The Dinaric minnow and the Mostar minnow are found in Bosnia and Herzegovina, and the Damatian minnow in Croatia.

== Conservation status ==
Phoxinellus minnows have restricted ranges, and the International Union for Conservation of Nature classifies each of them as Endangered.
