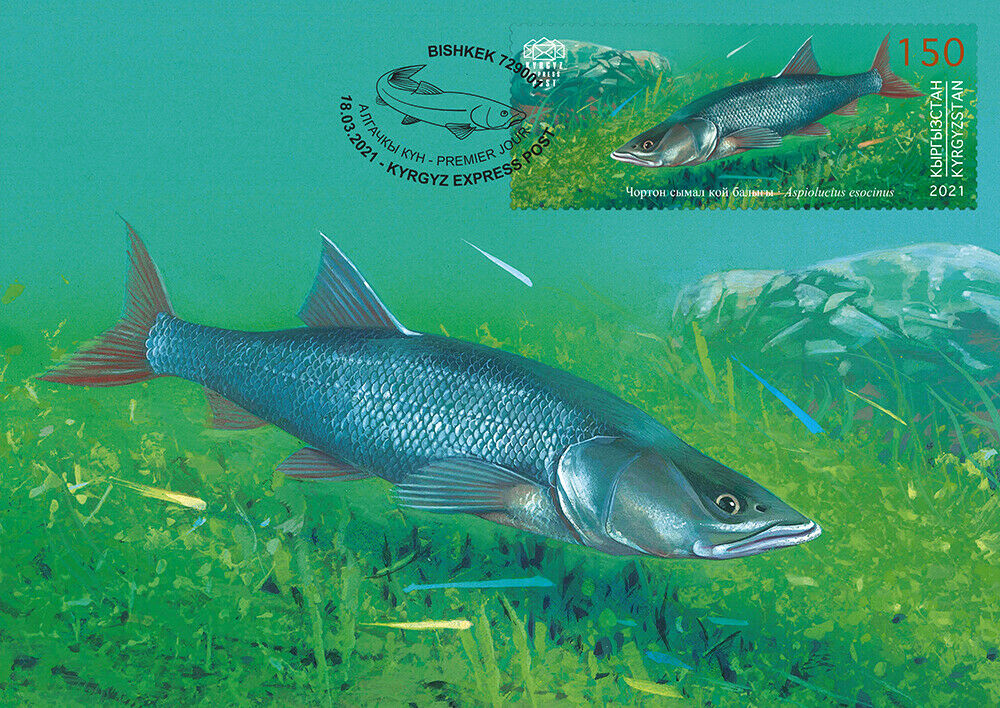
- A. esocinus on a postal cover of Kyrgyzstan

Conservation status
- Endangered (IUCN 3.1)

Scientific classification
- Kingdom: Animalia
- Phylum: Chordata
- Class: Actinopterygii
- Order: Cypriniformes
- Family: Leuciscidae
- Subfamily: Leuciscinae
- Genus: Aspiolucius; Berg, 1907
- Species: A. esocinus

Binomial name
- Aspiolucius esocinus (Kessler, 1874)

Synonyms
- Aspius esocinus Kessler, 1874

= Aspiolucius =

Species of fish

Aspiolucius is a monospecific genus of freshwater ray-finned fish belonging to the family Leuciscidae. The only species in the genus is Aspiolucius esocinus, the pike asp, This species is found in Central Asia in rivers such as the Amu Darya and Syr Darya, and occasionally lakes in Tajikistan, Kyrgyzstan, Turkmenistan and Uzbekistan, where it was a common fish until 1980s. After that, the population had rapidly declined, so that the species was declared endangered in these countries, and extinct in the neighboring Kazakhstan. This species can reach a total length of 50 cm (20 in).
