= Johann Christoph Andreas Mayer =

German anatomist

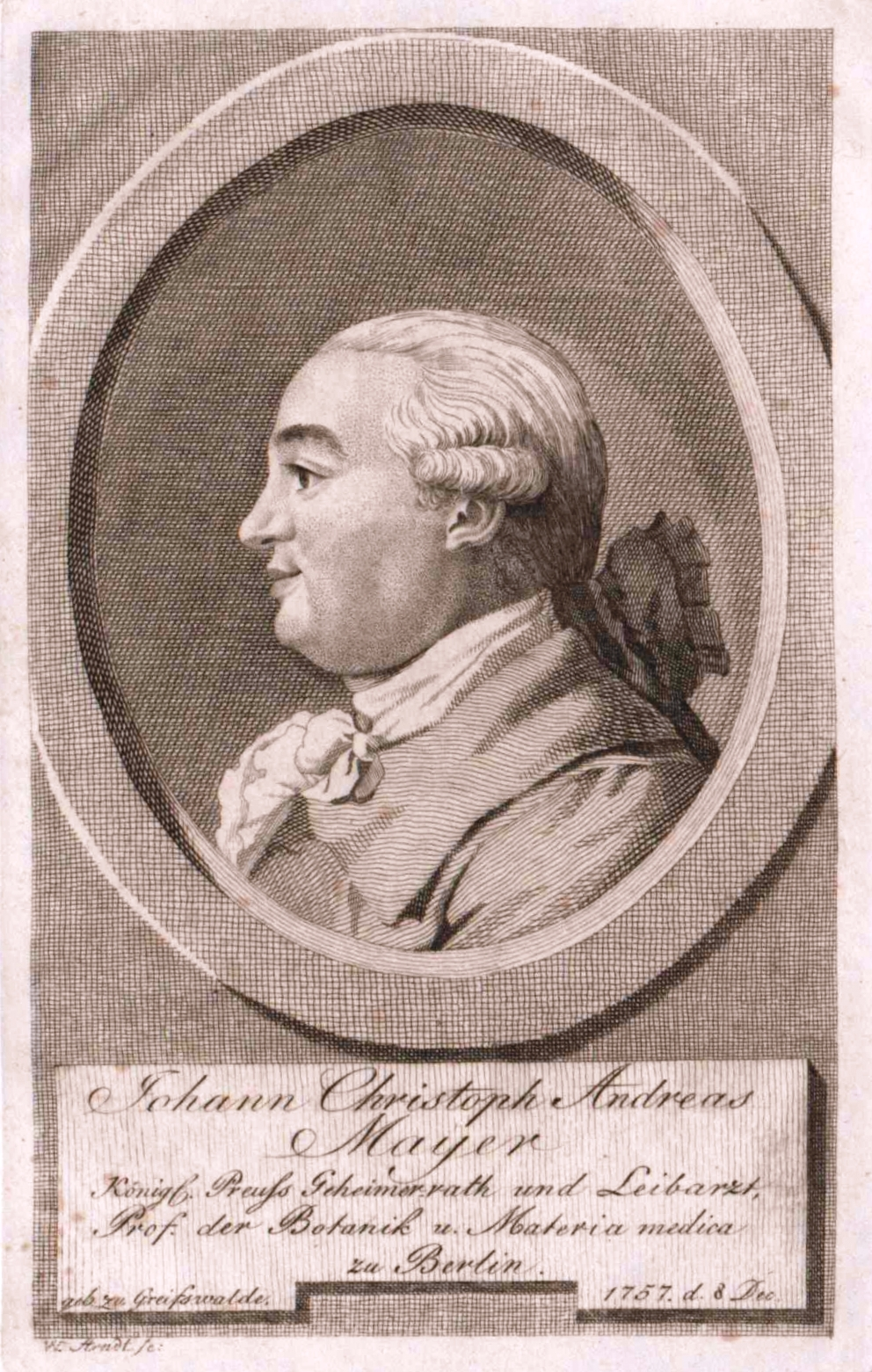
Johann Christoph Portrait

Johann Christophe Andreas Mayer (8 December 1747 – 5 November 1801) was a German anatomist.

Mayer worked in Berlin and later Frankfurt. In 1788, he was the first European to recognize that fingerprints were unique to each individual.

His 1779 work Anatomische-Physiologische Abhandlung vom Gehirn, Rückmark, und Ursprung der Nerven mistakenly referred to the hippocampus as "hippopotamus" in reference to the digitations of the anterior part of the hippocampus. This terminology was adopted by German anatomists in the following decades.
