= Ludwig Heinrich Jeitteles =

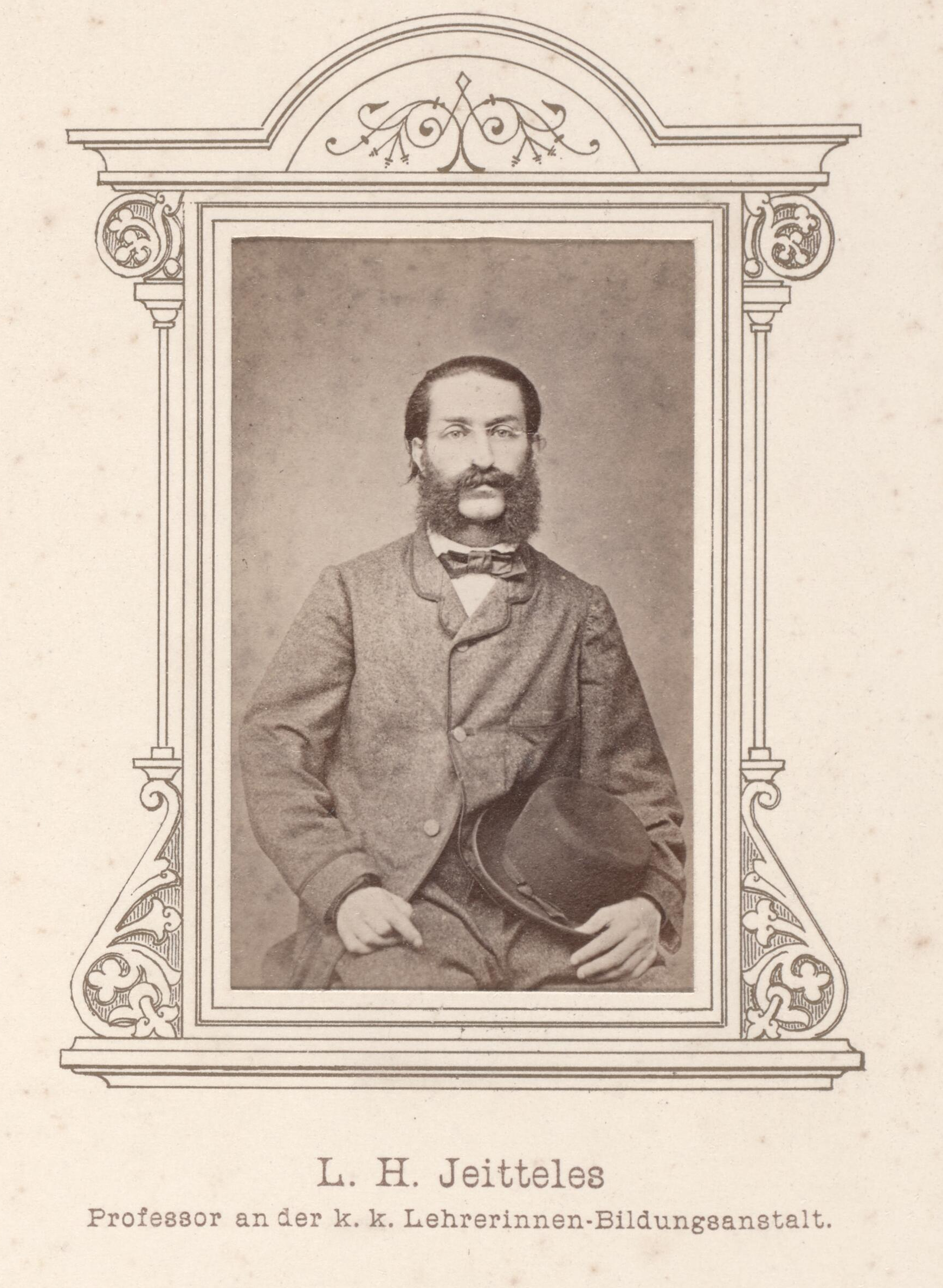
Portrait from a 1876 album gifted to Darwin

Ludwig Heinrich Jeitteles (12 January 1830 – 25 January 1883) was an Austrian zoologist and prehistorian. He worked as a high school teacher and took an interest in archaeology, zoology and natural history in general. He also took an interest in the study of earthquakes.

== Life and work ==
Jeitteles was born in Vienna, the son of Andreas Ludwig Jeitteles (1799–1878), a professor at the University of Vienna belonging to a German Jewish family from Prague. Andreas Ludwig Jeitteles was a support of German and had anti-Slavic tendencies. A sibling was the Germanist librarian Adalbert (1831–1908). Ludwig Heinrich studied at a grammar school in Olomouc before studying law in Olomouc University (183901851). He then studied natural sciences at the University of Vienna (1851–1855) and qualified as a teacher in 1855. He then taught at grammar schools in Marburg (1856), Graz (1857), Troppau (1858), Kaschau (1858–61) after which he lived in Vienna. In 1870 he moved to the Salzburg teacher training centre and in 1874 to Vienna. Here he taught at the institute for the training of female teachers.

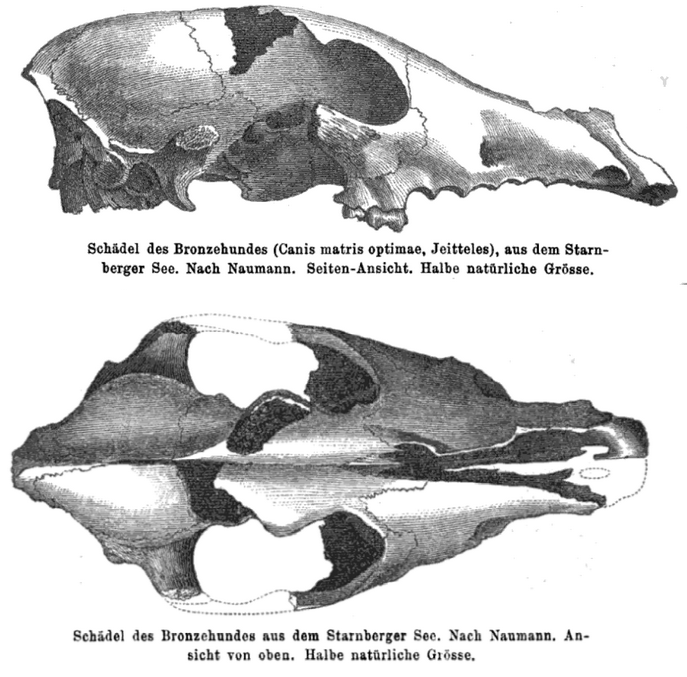
Skull of Canis matris optimae

In his spare time Jeitteles conducted research in natural history, archaeology and on earthquakes. He also studied the bird collections of Emil Holub. He became very interested in earthquakes following the January 15, 1858 earthquake and produced a map based on the timing of the quake using which he made suggestions on the geological structures of the region. He corresponded widely with scholars, including with Oswald Heer (1809–1883), Ferdinand Keller (1800–1881), Rudolf Virchow (1821–1902), Friedrich von Kenner (1834–1922), Charles Darwin and others on a variety of topics. From the 1860s he took an interest in prehistoric dog breeds and collected canid skulls. He named a species of dog found in a Bronze Age archaeological excavation site near Olomutz as Canis matris optimae. He considered it to be the ancestor of the German shepherd dog. He also took an interest in the paleohistoric domestication of chicken.

Jeitteles married Marianne Baroness Duval de Dampierre in 1880. He suffered from nervous headaches for years and shot himself dead on 25 January 1883.
