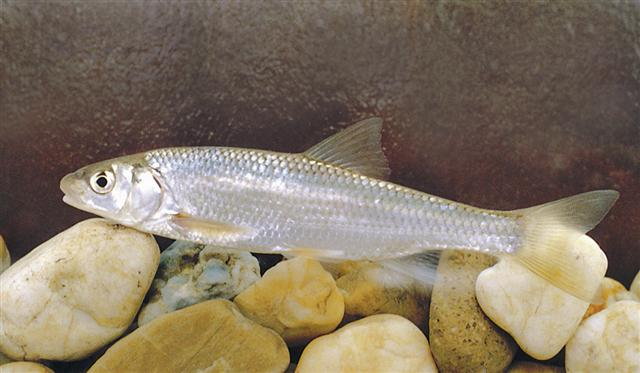
- Common dace (Leuciscus leuciscus)

Scientific classification
- Kingdom: Animalia
- Phylum: Chordata
- Class: Actinopterygii
- Division: Teleostei
- Order: Cypriniformes
- Family: Leuciscidae
- Subfamily: Leuciscinae; Bonaparte, 1835

Genera
- See text

= Leuciscinae =

Leuciscinae Temporal range: Eocene–present

Subfamily of freshwater fishes

Leuciscinae is a subfamily of freshwater ray-finned fishes belonging to the family Leuciscidae, which includes the fishes known as daces, chubs, shiners and minnows. The fishes in this subfamily are mainly found in Eurasia, with one genus (Notemigonus) in North America.

== Genera ==
Leuciscinae contains the following genera:

- Abramis Cuvier, 1816 (common bream)
- Acanthobrama Heckel 1843 (bleaks)
- Achondrostoma Robalo, Almada, Levy & Doadrio, 2007
- Alburnoides Jeitteles, 1861 (riffle minnows)
- Alburnus Rafinesque, 1820 (bleaks)
- Anaecypris Collares-Pereira, 1983 (Spanish minnowcarp)
- Aspiolucius Berg, 1907 (pike-asp)
- Ballerus Heckel, 1843 (breams)
- Blicca Heckel, 1843 (silver bream)
- Capoetobrama Berg, 1916 (sharpray)
- Chondrostoma Agassiz, 1832 (typical nases)
- Delminichthys Freyhof, Lieckfeldt, Bogutskaya, Pitra & Ludwig, 2006
- Egirdira Freyhof, 2022
- Iberochondrostoma Robalo, Almada, Levy & Doadrio, 2007
- Ladigesocypris M. S. Karaman 1972
- Leucalburnus Berg, 1916
- Leucaspius Heckel & Kner, 1857 (moderlieschen)
- Leuciscus Cuvier, 1816 (Eurasian dace)
- Leucos Heckel, 1843
- Mirogrex Goren, Fishelson & Trewavas, 1973
- Notemigonus Rafinesque, 1819 (golden shiner)
- Orthroleucos Derjavin, 1937
- Pachychilon Steindachner, 1882
- Parachondrostoma Robalo, Almada, Levy & Doadrio, 2007
- Pelasgus Kottelat & Freyhof, 2007
- Pelecus Agassiz, 1835 (sabre carp)
- Petroleuciscus Bogutskaya, 2002 (Ponto-Caspian chubs and daces)
- Phoxinellus Heckel, 1843
- Protochondrostoma Robalo, Almada, Levy & Doadrio, 2007
- Pseudochondrostoma Robalo, Almada, Levy & Doadrio, 2007
- Pseudophoxinus Bleeker, 1860
- Rutilus Rafinesque, 1820 (katum, pearlfish and roach)
- Sarmarutilus Bianco & Ketmaier, 2014 (South European roach)
- Scardinius Bonaparte, 1837 (rudd)
- Squalius Bonaparte, 1837 (European chubs)
- Telestes Bonaparte, 1840
- Tropidophoxinellus Stephanidis, 1974
- Turcichondrostoma Turan, Küçük, Güçlü & Aksu 2021
- Vimba Fitzinger, 1873
- †Yucypris Chen, 2026

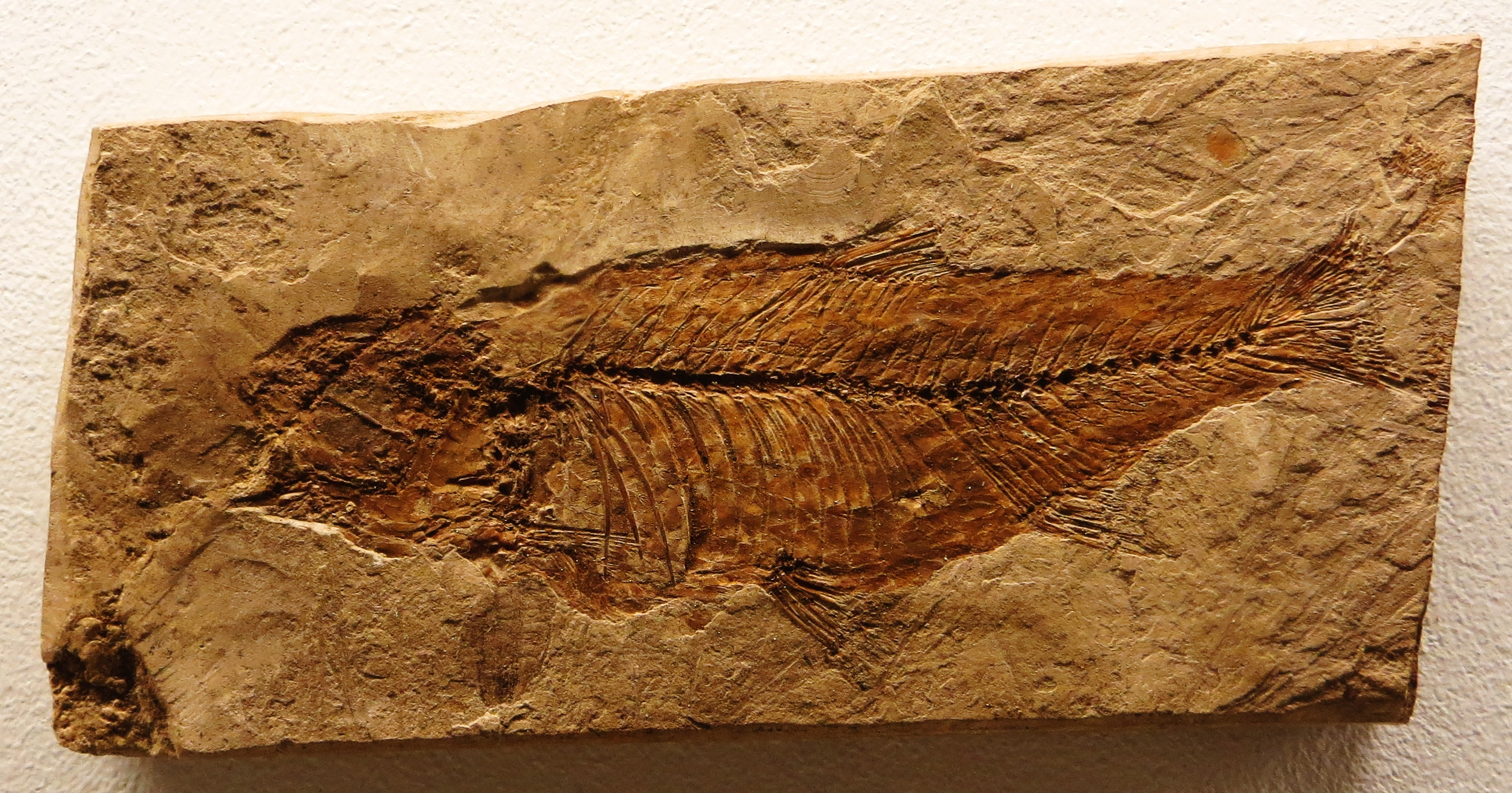
The extinct minnow Palaeoleuciscus

The extinct genus †Palaeoleuciscus Obrhelová, 1969 is known from the Early Miocene of Europe. A well-preserved fossil specimen of an indeterminate leuciscine is known from the Pliocene of the Chotanagpur Plateau of India, suggesting that leuciscines also inhabited India during this time.
