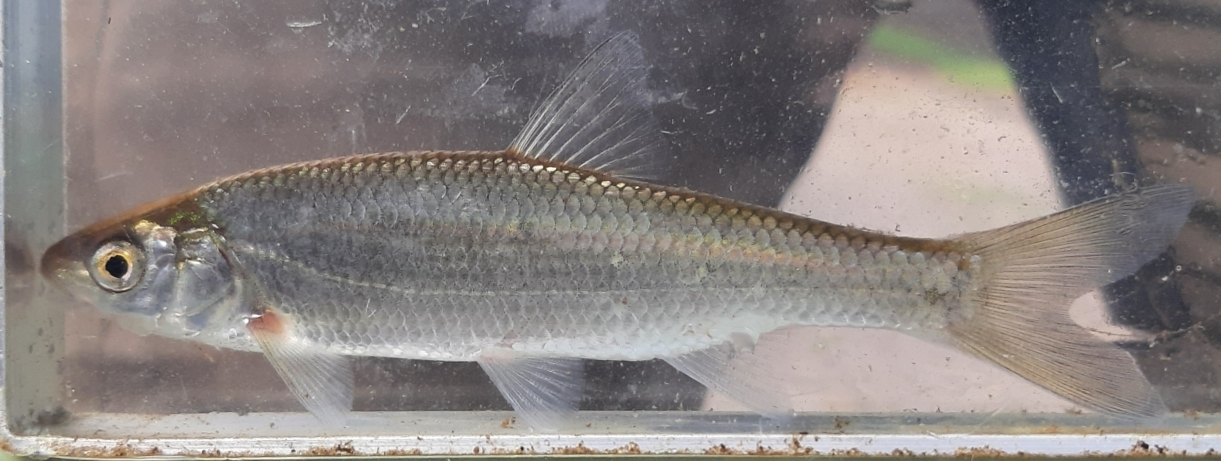
- Common dace (Leuciscus leuciscus)

Scientific classification
- Kingdom: Animalia
- Phylum: Chordata
- Class: Actinopterygii
- Division: Teleostei
- Order: Cypriniformes
- Suborder: Cyprinoidei
- Family: Leuciscidae; Bonaparte, 1835

Subfamiles
- Pogonichthyinae Girard, 1858; Phoxininae Bleeker, 1863; Leuciscinae Bonaparte, 1835; Plagopterinae Cope, 1874; Laviniinae Bleeker, 1863; Pseudaspininae Bogutskaya, 1990

= Leuciscidae =

Leuciscidae Temporal range: Middle Eocene–present

Family of fishes

Leuciscidae is a family of pelagic, freshwater ray-finned fishes(formerly classified as a subfamily of the Cyprinidae), which consists of the true minnows, shiners, and daces.

Members of the Old World (OW) clade of minnows within this subfamily are known as European minnows. As the name suggests, most members of the OW clade are found in Eurasia, aside from the golden shiner (Notemigonus crysoleucas), which is found in eastern North America.

According to ancestral area reconstruction, the subfamily Leuciscinae is thought to have originated in Europe before becoming widely distributed in parts of Europe, Asia and North America. Evidence for the dispersal of this subfamily can be marked by biogeographical scenarios/observations, geomorphological changes, phylogenetic relationships as well as evidence for vicariance events taking place through time. Through analyses and evidence of divergence time, it was observed that the two monophyletic groups, the phoxinins and the leuciscins, had shared a common ancestor dating to approximately 70.7 million years ago, representing their lengthy evolutionary history. (Note: The study by Perea et al. (2010) did not include the North American clade, or Pogonichthyinae, which is now also considered a part of the Leuciscinae subfamily) The 5th edition of the Fishes of the World classifies the Leuciscinae as a subfamily of the Cyprinidae but more recent classifications have resolved this taxon as a family, the Leuciscidae.

== Genera ==
Eschmeyer's Catalog of Fishes recognises the family Leuciscidae, and divides it into subfamilies that correspond to the clades previously identified when it was treated as a subfamily of Cyprinidae.

The following fossil genera are known:

- †Idadon Smith, 1975 (fossil, late Neogene of western United States; potential affinities to Laviniinae or Pogonichthyinae)
- †Mystocheilus Van Tassel & Smith, 2019 (fossil, early Pliocene of Oregon, USA; potential affinities to Laviniinae or Pogonichthyinae)
- †Tianshanicus Su, 2011 (fossil, Lutetian of Xinjiang, China; Leuciscinae sensu lato)
- †Yucypris Chen et al, 2026 (fossil, Lutetian of Henan, China' Leuciscinae sensu lato)

The recent genera are classified as follows:

- Pogonichthyinae Girard, 1858
  - Agosia Girard, 1856 (longfin dace)
  - Alburnops Girard, 1856
  - Algansea Girard, 1856 (Mexican chubs)
  - Aztecula D. S. Jordan & Evermann, 1898 (Aztec chub)
  - Campostoma Agassiz, 1855 (stonerollers)
  - Clinostomus Girard, 1856 (redside daces)
  - Coccotis D. S. Jordan, 1882
  - Codoma Girard, 1856 (ornate shiner)
  - Cyprinella Girard, 1856 (satinfin shiners)
  - Dionda Girard, 1856 (desert minnows)
  - Ericymba Cope, 1865 (longjaw minnows)
  - Erimonax D. S. Jordan, 1924 (spotfin chub)
  - Erimystax D. S. Jordan, 1882 (slender chubs)
  - Exoglossum Rafinesque, 1818 (cutlip minnows)
  - Graodus Günther, 1868
  - Hudsonius Girard, 1856
  - Hybognathus Agassiz, 1855 (silvery minnows)
  - Hybopsis Agassiz, 1854 (bigeye chubs)
  - Hydrophlox D. S. Jordan, 1878
  - Iotichthys D. S. Jordan & Evermann, 1896 (least chub)
  - Luxilus Rafinesque, 1820 (highscale shiners)
  - Macrhybopsis Cockerell & Allison 1909 (blacktail chubs)
  - Miniellus D. S. Jordan, 1882
  - Mylocheilus Agassiz, 1855 (peamouths)
  - Nocomis Girard 1856 (hornyhead chubs)
  - Notropis Rafinesque, 1818 (eastern shiners)
  - Oregonichthys Hubbs, 1929 (Oregon chubs)
  - Paranotropis Fowler, 1904
  - Pararhinichthys Goldsborough & Clark, 1908
  - Phenacobius Cope, 1867 (suckermouth minnows)
  - Pimephales Rafinesque, 1820 (bluntnose minnows)
  - Platygobio gill, 1863 (flathead chub)
  - Pogonichthys Girard, 1854 (splittails)
  - Pteronotropis Fowler, 1935 (flagfin shiners)
  - Rhinichthys Agassiz, 1849 (riffle daces, loach minnows)
  - Richardsonius Girard, 1856 (redside shiners)
  - †Stypodon Garman, 1881 (stumptooth minnow)
  - Tampichthys Schönhuth, Doadrio, Dominguez-Dominguez, Hillis & Mayden, 2008
  - Tiaroga Girard, 1856 (loach minnow)
  - Yuriria D. S. Jordan & Evermann, 1896
- Phoxininae Bleeker, 1863
  - Phoxinus Rafinesque, 1820 (Eurasian minnows and daces)
- Leuciscinae Bonaparte, 1835
  - Abramis Cuvier, 1816 (common bream)
  - Acanthobrama Heckel 1843 (bleaks)
  - Achondrostoma Robalo, Almada, Levy & Doadrio, 2007
  - Alburnoides Jeitteles, 1861 (riffle minnows)
  - Alburnus Rafinesque, 1820 (bleaks)
  - Anaecypris Collares-Pereira, 1983 (Spanish minnowcarp)
  - Aspiolucius Berg, 1907 (pike-asp)
  - Ballerus Heckel, 1843 (breams)
  - Blicca Heckel, 1843 (silver bream)
  - Capoetobrama Berg, 1916 (sharpray)
  - Chondrostoma Agassiz, 1832 (typical nases)
  - Delminichthys Freyhof, Lieckfeldt, Bogutskaya, Pitra & Ludwig, 2006
  - Egirdira Freyhof, 2022
  - Iberochondrostoma Robalo, Almada, Levy & Doadrio, 2007
  - Ladigesocypris M. S. Karaman 1972
  - Leucalburnus Berg, 1916
  - Leucaspius Heckel & Kner, 1857 (moderlieschen)
  - Leuciscus Cuvier, 1816 (Eurasian dace)
  - Leucos Heckel, 1843
  - Mirogrex Goren, Fishelson & Trewavas, 1973
  - Notemigonus Rafinesque, 1819 (golden shiner)
  - Pachychilon Steindachner, 1882
  - Parachondrostoma Robalo, Almada, Levy & Doadrio, 2007
  - Pelasgus Kottelat & Freyhof, 2007
  - Pelecus Agassiz, 1835 (sabre carp)
  - Petroleuciscus Bogutskaya, 2002 (Ponto-Caspian chubs and daces)
  - Phoxinellus Heckel, 1843
  - Protochondrostoma Robalo, Almada, Levy & Doadrio, 2007
  - Pseudochondrostoma Robalo, Almada, Levy & Doadrio, 2007
  - Pseudophoxinus Bleeker, 1860
  - Rutilus Rafinesque, 1820 (katum, pearlfish and roach)
  - Sarmarutilus Bianco & Ketmaier, 2014 (South European roach)
  - Scardinius Bonaparte, 1837 (rudd)
  - Squalius Bonaparte, 1837 (European chubs)
  - Telestes Bonaparte, 1840
  - Tropidophoxinellus Stephanidis, 1974
  - Turcichondrostoma Turan, Küçük, Güçlü & Aksu 2021
  - Vimba Fitzinger, 1873
- Plagopterinae Cope, 1874
  - Couesius Jordan, 1878 (lake chub)
  - Hemitremia Cope 1870 (flame chub)
  - Lepidomeda Cope, 1874 (spinedaces)
  - Margariscus Cockerell, 1909 (pearl daces)
  - Meda Girard, 1856 (pikedace)
  - Plagopterus Cope, 1874 (woundfin)
  - Semotilus Rafinesque, 1820 (creek chubs)
- Laviniinae Bleeker, 1863
  - Chrosomus Rafinesque, 1820 (redbelly daces)
  - Eremichthys Hubbs & R. R. Miller, 1948 (desert dace)
  - †Evarra Woolman, 1894 (Mexican daces)
  - Gila Baird & Girard, 1853 (western chubs)
  - Hesperoleucus Snyder, 1913 (California roach)
  - Lavinia Girard, 1854 (hitch)
  - Mylopharodon Ayres, 1855 (hardheads)
  - Orthodon Girard, 1856 (Sacramento blackfish)
  - Ptychocheilus Agassiz, 1855 (pikeminnows)
  - Relictus Hubbs & R. R. Miller, 1972 (relict dace)
  - Siphateles Cope, 1883
- Pseudaspininae Bogutskaya, 1990
  - Oreoleuciscus Warpachowski, 1889 (osmans)
  - Pseudaspius Dybowski, 1869 (redfin)
  - Rhynchocypris Günther, 1889
