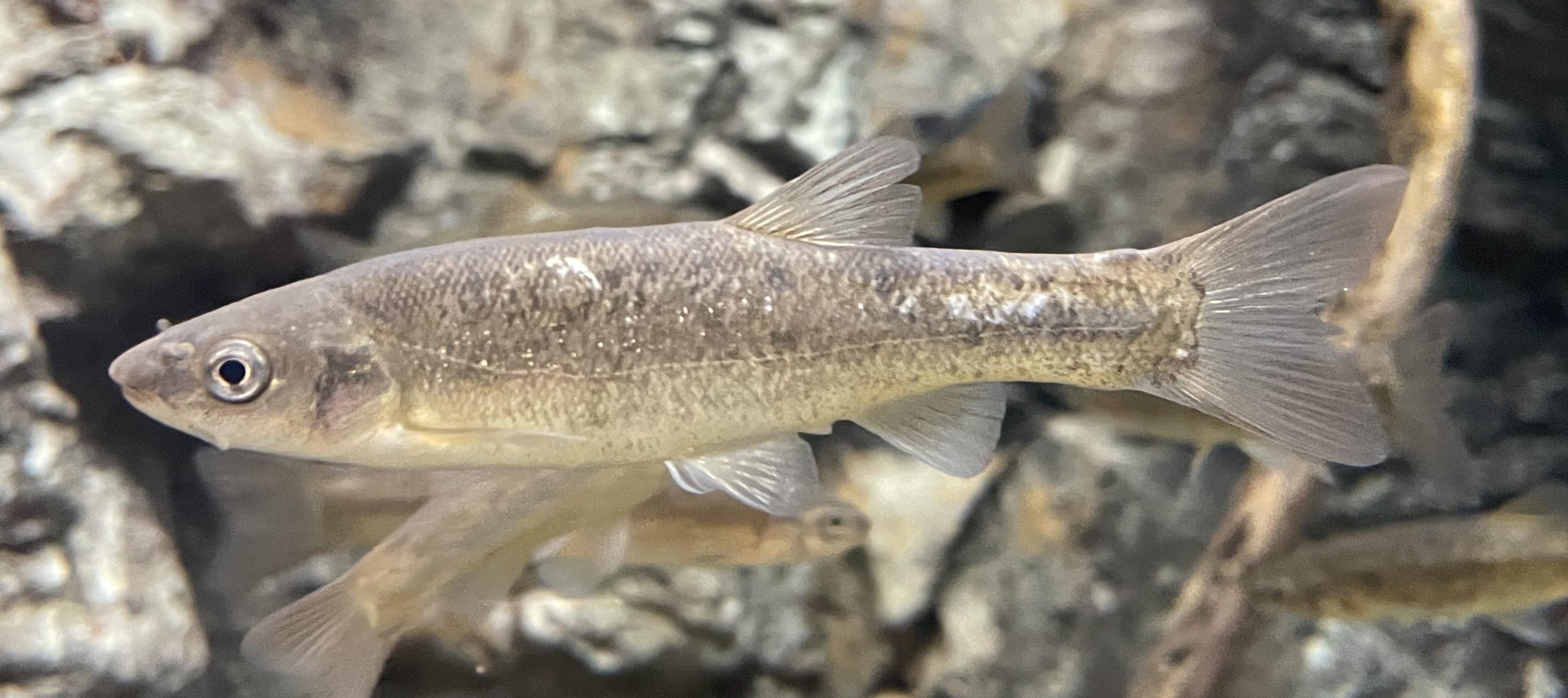

Scientific classification
- Kingdom: Animalia
- Phylum: Chordata
- Class: Actinopterygii
- Order: Cypriniformes
- Family: Leuciscidae
- Subfamily: Pseudaspininae
- Genus: Rhynchocypris
- Species: R. jouyi

Binomial name
- Rhynchocypris jouyi (D. S. Jordan & Snyder, 1901)

Synonyms
- Leuciscus jouyi D. S. Jordan & Snyder, 1901

= Rhynchocypris jouyi =

Species of fish

Rhynchocypris jouyi is a species of freshwater ray-finned fish belonging to the family Leuciscidae, which includes the daces, chubs, true minnows and related fishes. This species has been regarded as a subspecies of the Chinese minnow (R. oxycephalus). R. jouyi is endemic to Japan.
