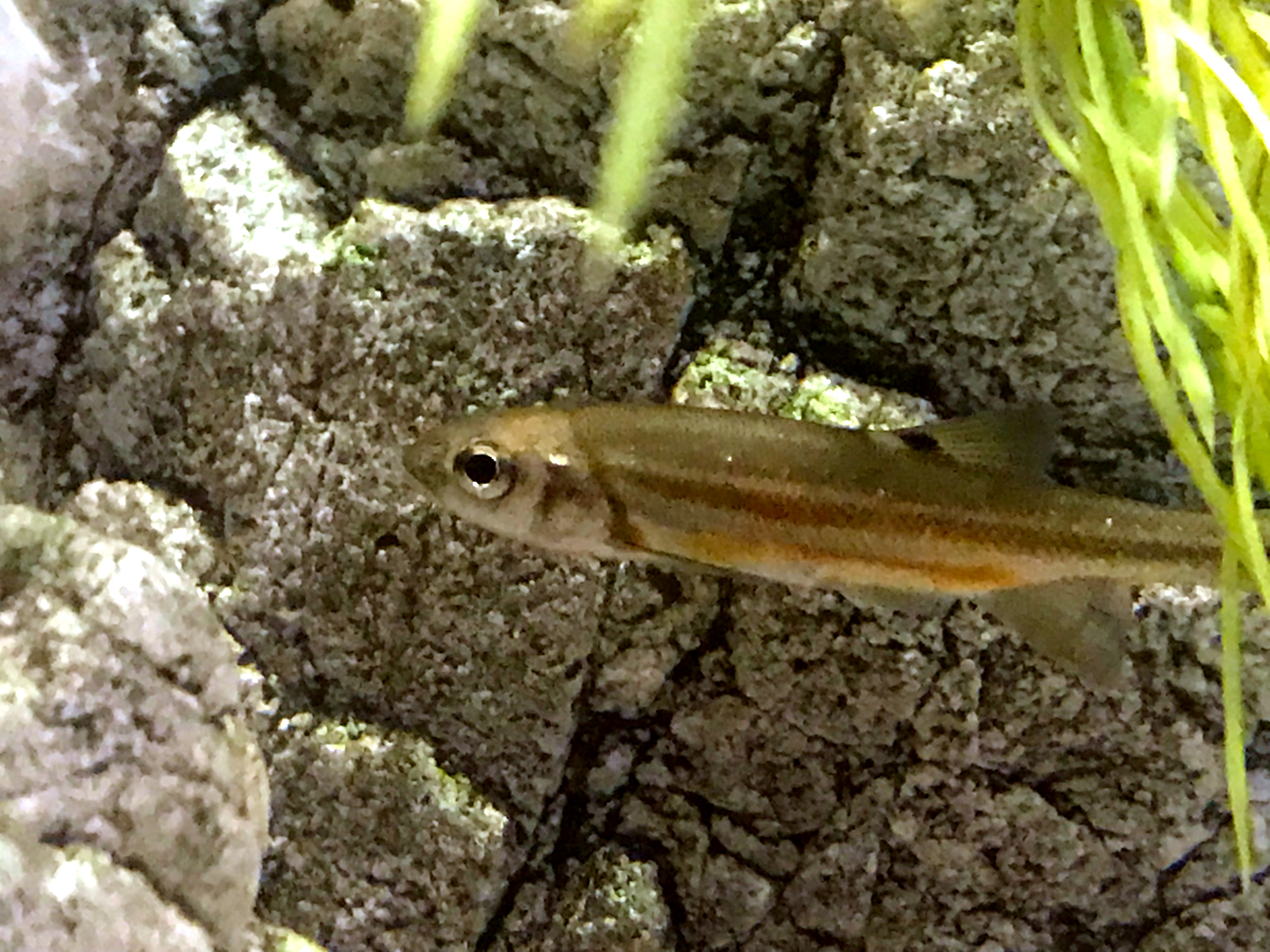

Scientific classification
- Kingdom: Animalia
- Phylum: Chordata
- Class: Actinopterygii
- Order: Cypriniformes
- Family: Leuciscidae
- Subfamily: Pseudaspininae
- Genus: Rhynchocypris
- Species: R. keumkang

Binomial name
- Rhynchocypris keumkang (Chyung, 1977)

Synonyms
- Moroco keumkang Chyung, 1977; Phoxinus keumkang (Chyung 1977); Phoxinus kumgangensis Kim, 1980; Rhynchocypris kumgangensis (Kim 1980)

= Rhynchocypris keumkang =

Species of fish

Rhynchocypris keumkang, the fat minnow, is a species of freshwater ray-finned fish belonging to the family Leuciscidae, which includes the daces, chubs, true minnows and related fishes. It is endemic to Korea.
