= Pseudaspius sachalinensis =

Conservation status
- Least Concern (IUCN 3.1)

Scientific classification
- Kingdom: Animalia
- Phylum: Chordata
- Class: Actinopterygii
- Order: Cypriniformes
- Family: Leuciscidae
- Subfamily: Pseudaspininae
- Genus: Pseudaspius
- Species: P. sachalinensis

Binomial name
- Pseudaspius sachalinensis (Nikolsky, 1889)

Synonyms
- Leuciscus sachalinensis Nikolsky, 1889; Tribolodon ezoe Okada & Ikeda, 1937; Tribolodon hakuensis subsp. ezoe Okada & Ikeda, 1937; Tribolodon sachalinensis (Nikolsky, 1889)

Species of fish

Pseudaspius sachalinensis is a species of freshwater ray-finned fish belonging to the family Leuciscidae, which contains the daces, chubs, true minnows and related species. It is endemic to Japan and Sakhalin.
