= Pseudaspius nakamurai =

Conservation status
- Endangered (IUCN 3.1)

Scientific classification
- Kingdom: Animalia
- Phylum: Chordata
- Class: Actinopterygii
- Order: Cypriniformes
- Family: Leuciscidae
- Subfamily: Pseudaspininae
- Genus: Pseudaspius
- Species: P. nakamurai

Binomial name
- Pseudaspius nakamurai (Doi & Shinzawa, 2000)

Synonyms
- Tribolodon nakamurai Doi & Shinzawa, 2000

Species of fish

Pseudaspius nakamurai is a species of freshwater ray-finned fish belonging to the family Leuciscidae, which contains the daces, chubs, true minnows and related species. It is endemic to Japan.
