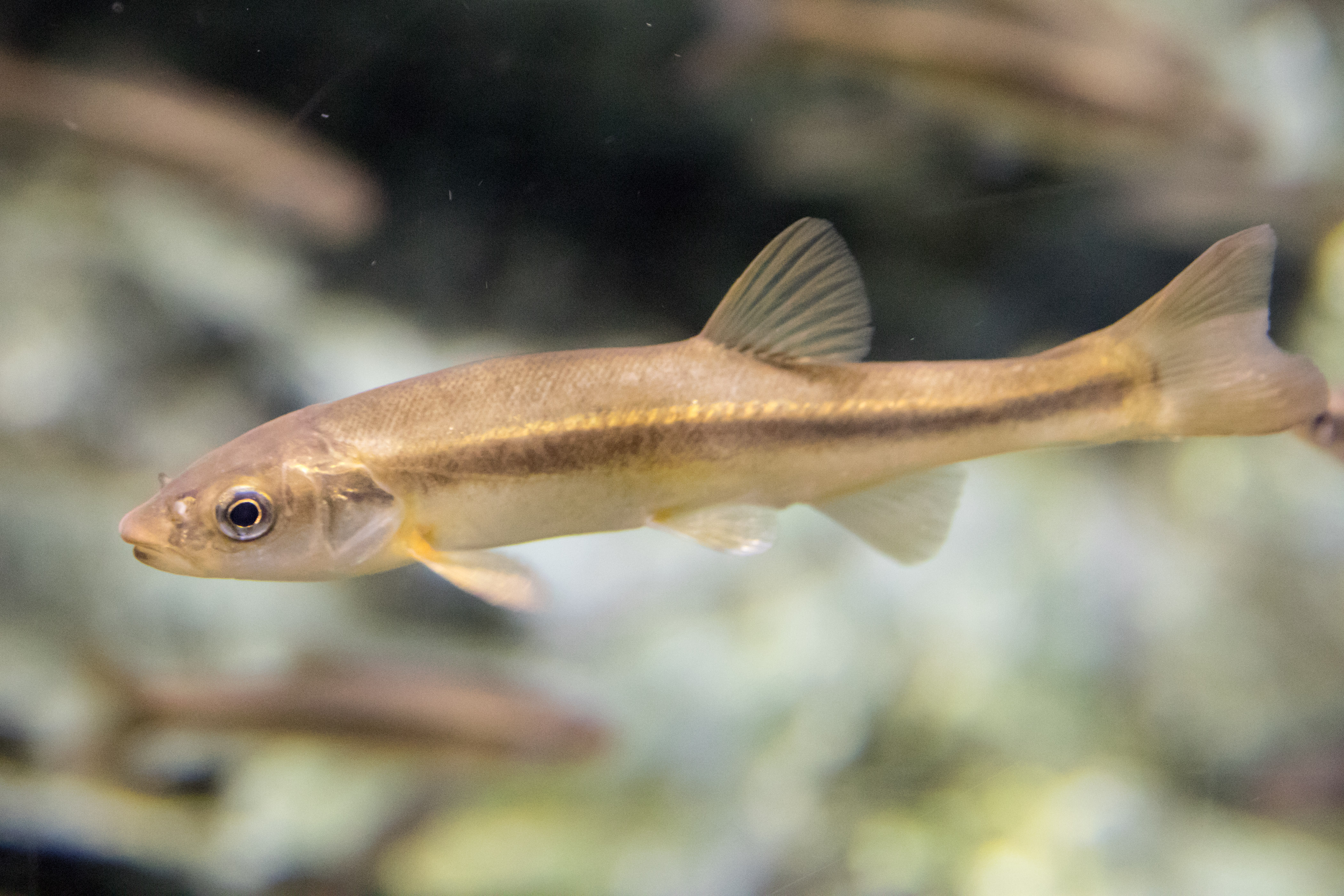

Conservation status
- Least Concern (IUCN 3.1)

Scientific classification
- Kingdom: Animalia
- Phylum: Chordata
- Class: Actinopterygii
- Order: Cypriniformes
- Family: Leuciscidae
- Subfamily: Pseudaspininae
- Genus: Rhynchocypris
- Species: R. steindachneri

Binomial name
- Rhynchocypris steindachneri Sauvage, 1883

Synonyms
- Phoxinus steindachneri Sauvage, 1883; Moroco steindachneri (Sauvage 1883); Leuciscus dorobae Ishikawa, 1904; Pseudaspius atrilatus D. S. Jordan & W. F. Thompson, 1914

= Rhynchocypris steindachneri =

Species of fish

Rhynchocypris steindachneri is a species of freshwater ray-finned fish belonging to the family Leuciscidae, which includes the daces, chubs, true minnows and related fishes. It is found in northeastern Asia.
