= Rhynchocypris dementjevi =

Conservation status
- Least Concern (IUCN 3.1)

Scientific classification
- Kingdom: Animalia
- Phylum: Chordata
- Class: Actinopterygii
- Order: Cypriniformes
- Family: Leuciscidae
- Subfamily: Pseudaspininae
- Genus: Rhynchocypris
- Species: R. dementjevi

Binomial name
- Rhynchocypris dementjevi (Turdakov & Piskarev, 1869)

Synonyms
- Phoxinus dementjevi Turdakov & Piskarev 1954; Lagowskiella dementjevi (Turdakov & Piskarev 1954)

Species of fish

Rhynchocypris dementjevi is a species of freshwater ray-finned fish belonging to the family Leuciscidae, which includes the daces, chubs, true minnows and related fishes. This fish is endemic to the Chu River catchment in Kazakhstan and Kyrgyzstan.
