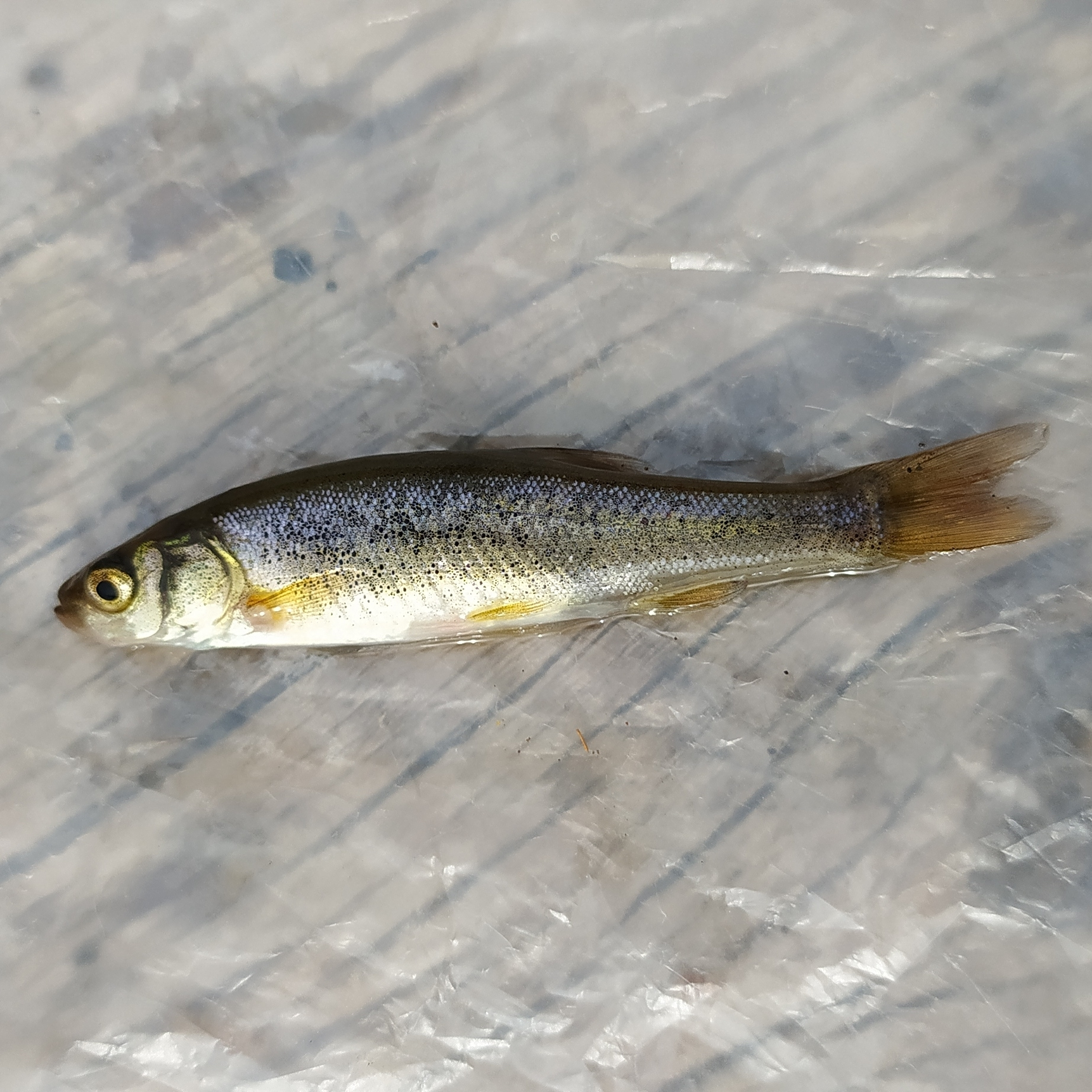

Conservation status
- Least Concern (IUCN 3.1)

Scientific classification
- Kingdom: Animalia
- Phylum: Chordata
- Class: Actinopterygii
- Order: Cypriniformes
- Family: Leuciscidae
- Subfamily: Pseudaspininae
- Genus: Rhynchocypris
- Species: R. czekanowskii

Binomial name
- Rhynchocypris czekanowskii (Dybowski, 1869)

Synonyms
- Phoxinus czekanowskii Dybowski, 1869; Lagowskiella czekanowskii (Dybowski, 1869); Phoxinus strauchi Warpachowski, 1887; Phoxinus sublaevis Warpachowski, 1887; Phoxinus czekanowskii ignatowi Berg, 1907; Phoxinus czekanowskii czerskii Berg, 1912; Phoxinus percnurus suifunensis Berg, 1932

= Czekanowski's minnow =

Species of fish

Czekanowski's minnow (Rhynchocypris czekanowskii) is a species of freshwater ray-finned fish belonging to the family Leuciscidae, which includes the daces, chubs, true minnows and related fishes. It is found in Russia, China, Korea, and Mongolia.
