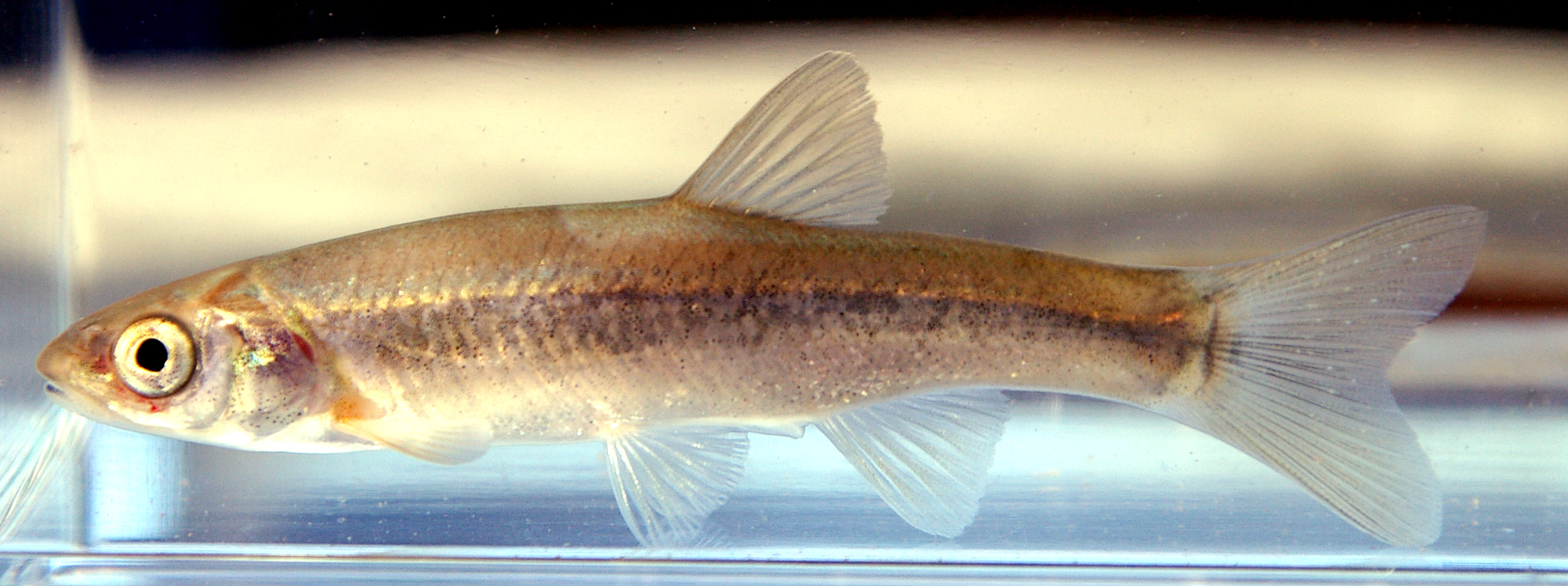

Conservation status
- Least Concern (IUCN 3.1)

Scientific classification
- Kingdom: Animalia
- Phylum: Chordata
- Class: Actinopterygii
- Order: Cypriniformes
- Family: Leuciscidae
- Subfamily: Pseudaspininae
- Genus: Rhynchocypris
- Species: R. lagowskii

Binomial name
- Rhynchocypris lagowskii (Dybowski, 1869)

Synonyms
- Phoxinus lagowskii Dybowski, 1869; Pseudaspius bergi D. S. Jordan & Metz, 1913; Moroco yamamotis D. S. Jordan & Hubbs, 1925; Phoxinus lagowskii chorensis Rendahl, 1928

= Amur minnow =

Species of fish

The Amur minnow or Lagowski's minnow (Rhynchocypris lagowskii) is a species of freshwater ray-finned fish belonging to the family Leuciscidae, which includes the daces, chubs, true minnows and related fishes. It is found from the Lena and Amur rivers in the north to the Yangtze in China in the south, and in Japan.
