= Rhynchocypris semotilus =

Scientific classification
- Kingdom: Animalia
- Phylum: Chordata
- Class: Actinopterygii
- Order: Cypriniformes
- Family: Leuciscidae
- Subfamily: Pseudaspininae
- Genus: Rhynchocypris
- Species: R. semotilus

Binomial name
- Rhynchocypris semotilus (D. D. Jordan & Starks, 1905)

Synonyms
- Leuciscus semotilus D. S. Jordan & Starks, 1905; Phoxinus semotilus (D. S. Jordan & Starks, 1905)

Species of fish

Rhynchocypris semotilus is a species of freshwater ray-finned fish belonging to the family Leuciscidae, which includes the daces, chubs, true minnows and related fishes. It is endemic to the Korean peninsula.
