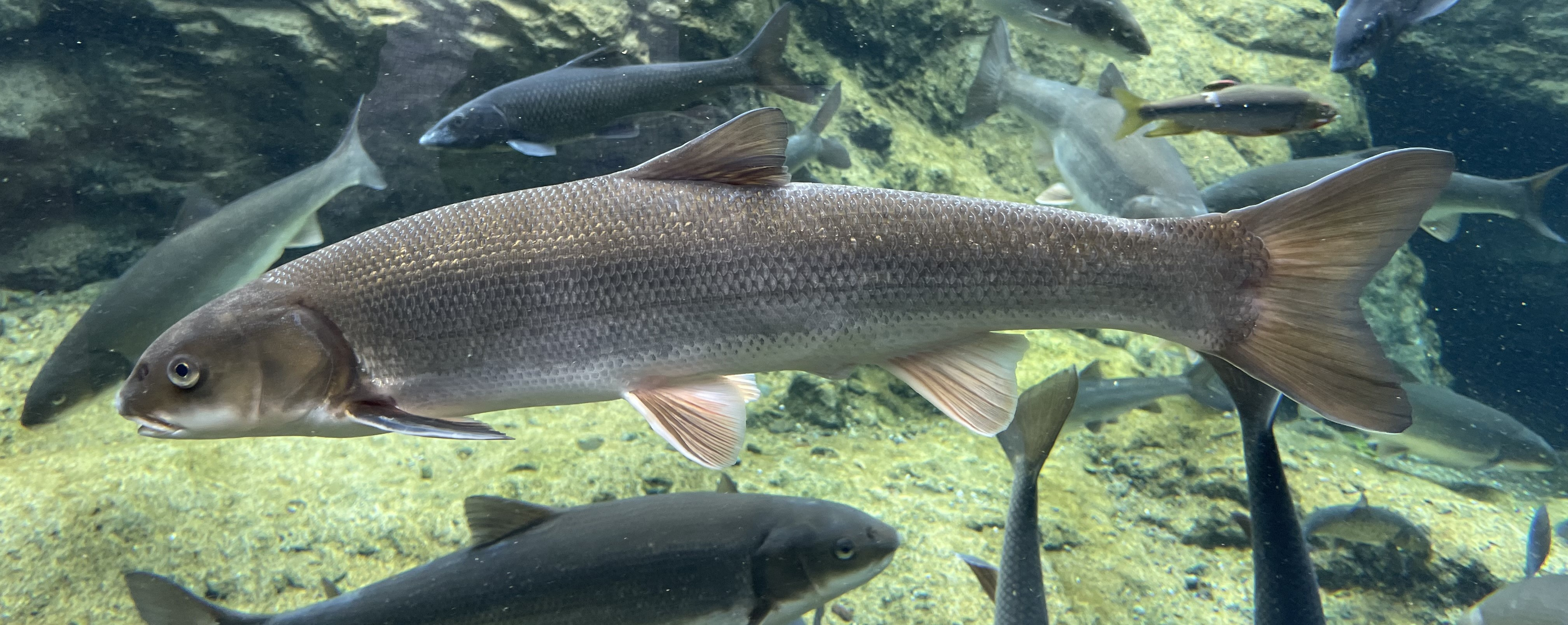

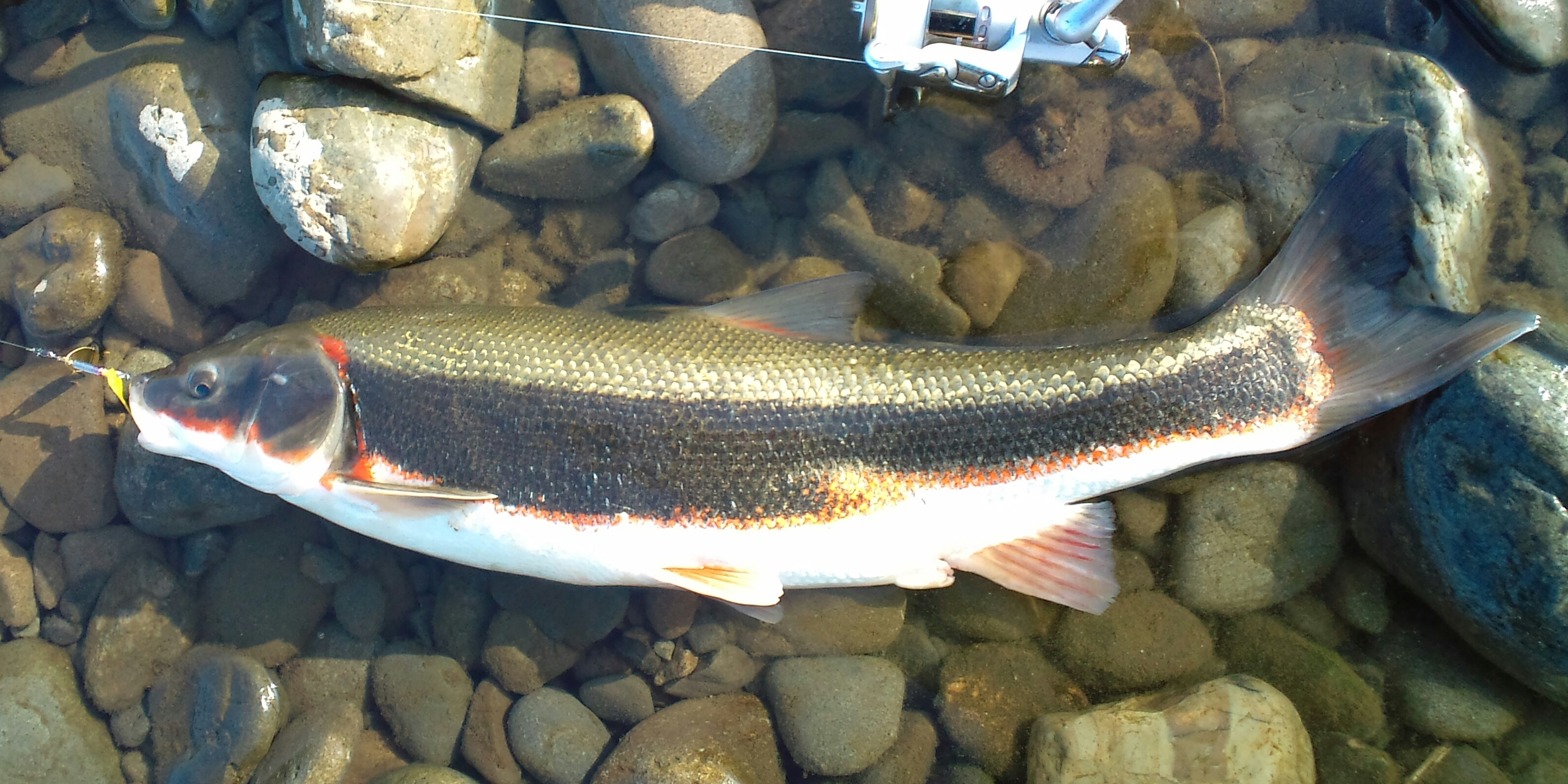

Conservation status
- Least Concern (IUCN 3.1)

Scientific classification
- Kingdom: Animalia
- Phylum: Chordata
- Class: Actinopterygii
- Order: Cypriniformes
- Family: Leuciscidae
- Subfamily: Pseudaspininae
- Genus: Pseudaspius
- Species: P. brandtii

Binomial name
- Pseudaspius brandtii (Dybowski, 1872)

Synonyms
- Telestes brandtii Dybowski, 1872; Tribolodon brandtii (Dybowski, 1872); Leuciscus taczanowskii Steindachner, 1881; Leuciscus adele Warpachowski, 1892; Leuciscus ledae Warpachowski, 1892; Leuciscus warpachowskii Schmidt, 1904; Acahara jusanensis D. S. Jordan & Hubbs, 1925; Tribolodon jusanensis (D. S. Jordan & Hubbs, 1925); Tribolodon brandtii maruta Sakai & Amano, 2014

= Pacific redfin =

Species of fish

The Pacific redfin (Pseudaspius brandtii) is a species of ray-finned fish belonging to the family Leuciscidae, which includes the daces, chubs, true minnows and related fishes. It is found from the Siberian Pacific Coast through coastal Japan.

== Etymology ==
The fish is named in honor of German naturalist Johann Friedrich von Brandt (1802–1879).

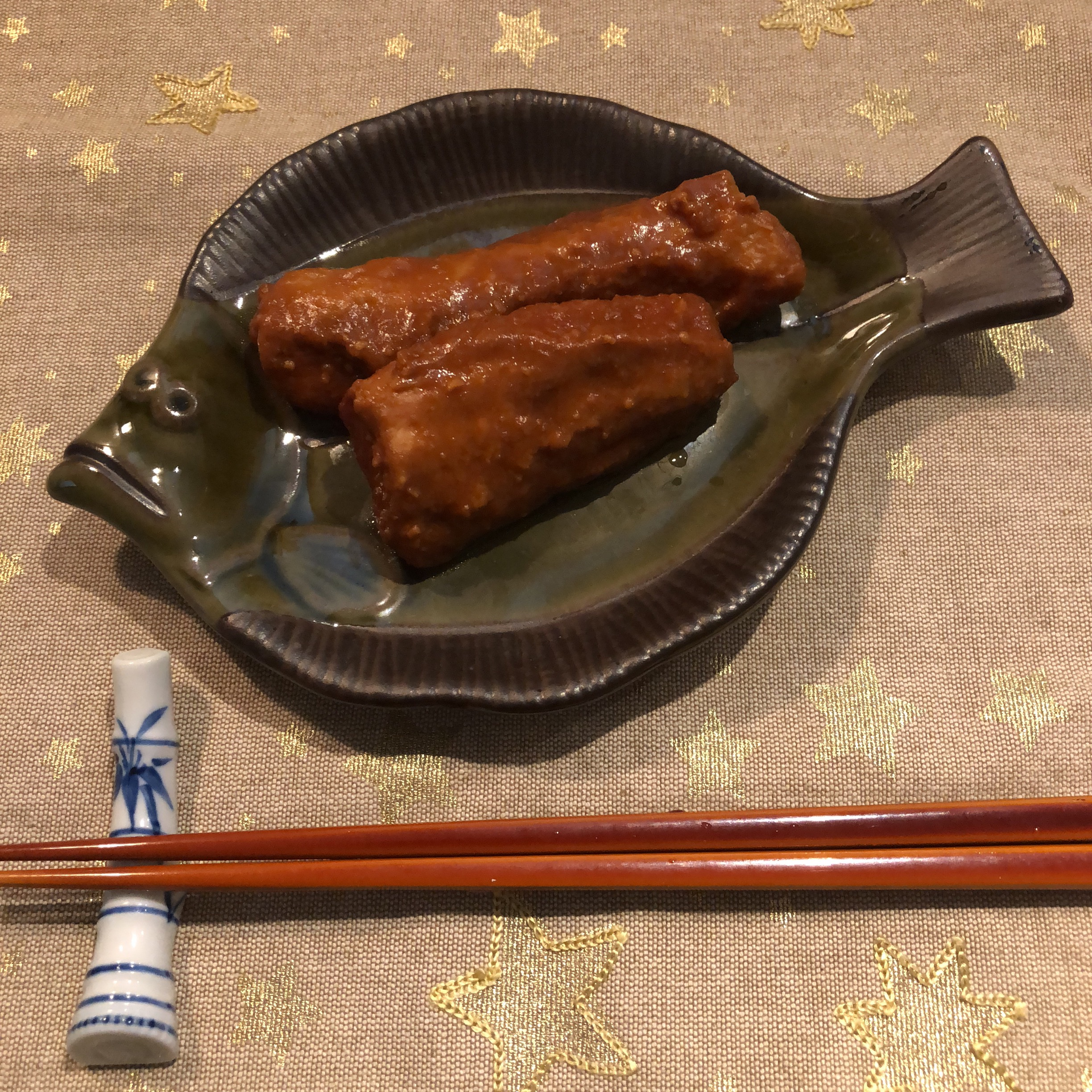
Boiled
