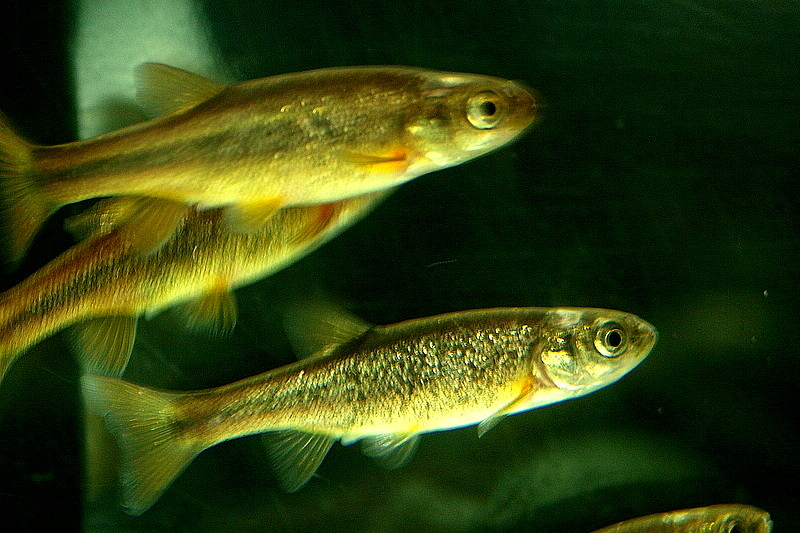

Conservation status
- Least Concern (IUCN 3.1)

Scientific classification
- Kingdom: Animalia
- Phylum: Chordata
- Class: Actinopterygii
- Order: Cypriniformes
- Family: Leuciscidae
- Subfamily: Pseudaspininae
- Genus: Rhynchocypris
- Species: R. percnurus

Binomial name
- Rhynchocypris percnurus (Pallas, 1814)

Synonyms
- Cyprinus percnurus Pallas, 1814; Cyprinus perenurus (Pallas, 1814); Phoxinus percnurus (Pallas, 1814); Phoxinus perenurus (Pallas, 1814); Eupallasella percnurus (Pallas, 1814); Leuciscus dauricus Valenciennes, 1844; Phoxinus jelskii Dybowski, 1869; Phoxinus perenurus var. dauricus Dybowski, 1877; Phoxinus laevis var. punctatus Benecke, 1880; Phoxinus stagnalis Warpachowski, 1886; Phoxinus altus Warpachowski, 1887; Phoxinus sabanejewi Warpachowski, 1887; Phoxinus variabilis Warpachowski, 1887; Phoxinus crucifer Gratzianov, 1907; Phoxinus dybowskii Lorec & Wolski 1910; Phoxinus percnurus sarykul Ruzsky, 1926; Phoxinus percnurus gdaniensis Berg, 1932; Phoxinus czekanowskii posnaniensis Berg, 1932; Phoxinus percnurus occidentalis Kaj, 1954

= Lake minnow =

Species of fish

The lake minnow or swamp minnow (Rhynchocypris percnurus) is a species of freshwater ray-finned fish belonging to the family Leuciscidae, which includes the daces, chubs, true minnows and related fishes. It has a wide but disjunct distribution including parts of Europe (Belarus, Czech Republic, Germany, Lithuania, Poland, Russia, and Ukraine) and Asia (northern China, Japan, Korea, and Siberia).

Individuals in this species can grow up to 18.5 cm (7.3 in).
