= Pseudaspius leptocephalus =

Conservation status
- Least Concern (IUCN 3.1)

Scientific classification
- Kingdom: Animalia
- Phylum: Chordata
- Class: Actinopterygii
- Order: Cypriniformes
- Family: Leuciscidae
- Subfamily: Pseudaspininae
- Genus: Pseudaspius
- Species: P. leptocephalus

Binomial name
- Pseudaspius leptocephalus (Pallas, 1776)

Synonyms
- Cyprinus leptocephalus Pallas, 1776

Species of fish

Pseudaspius leptocephalus, the redfin, is a species of freshwater ray-finned fish belonging to the family Leuciscidae, which contains the daces, chubs, true minnows and related species. found in eastern Asia where it occurs in the countries of Russia, Mongolia and China.
