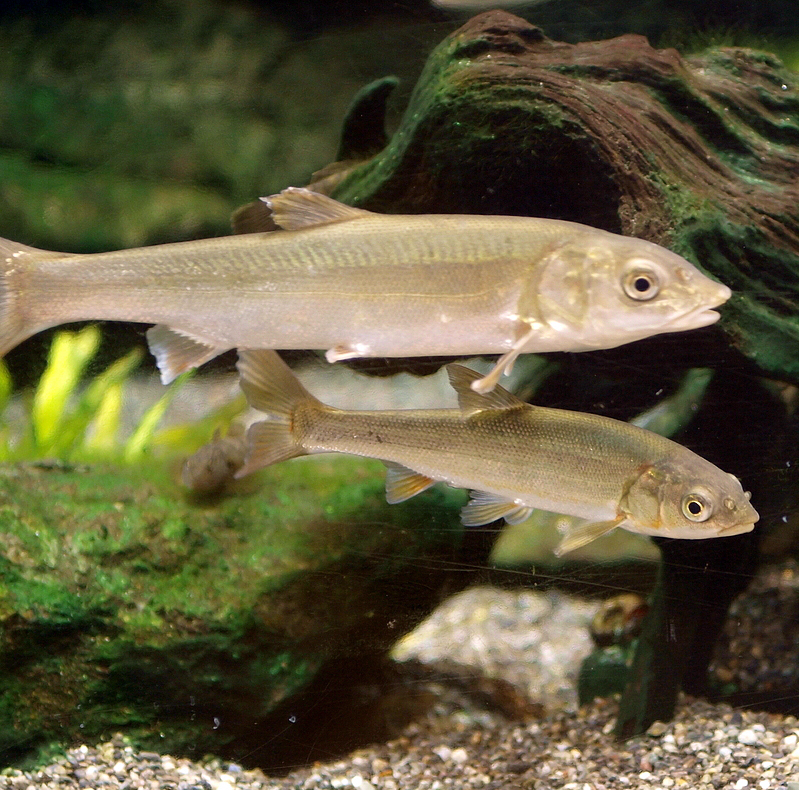
- Big-scaled redfin (Pseudaspius hakonensis)
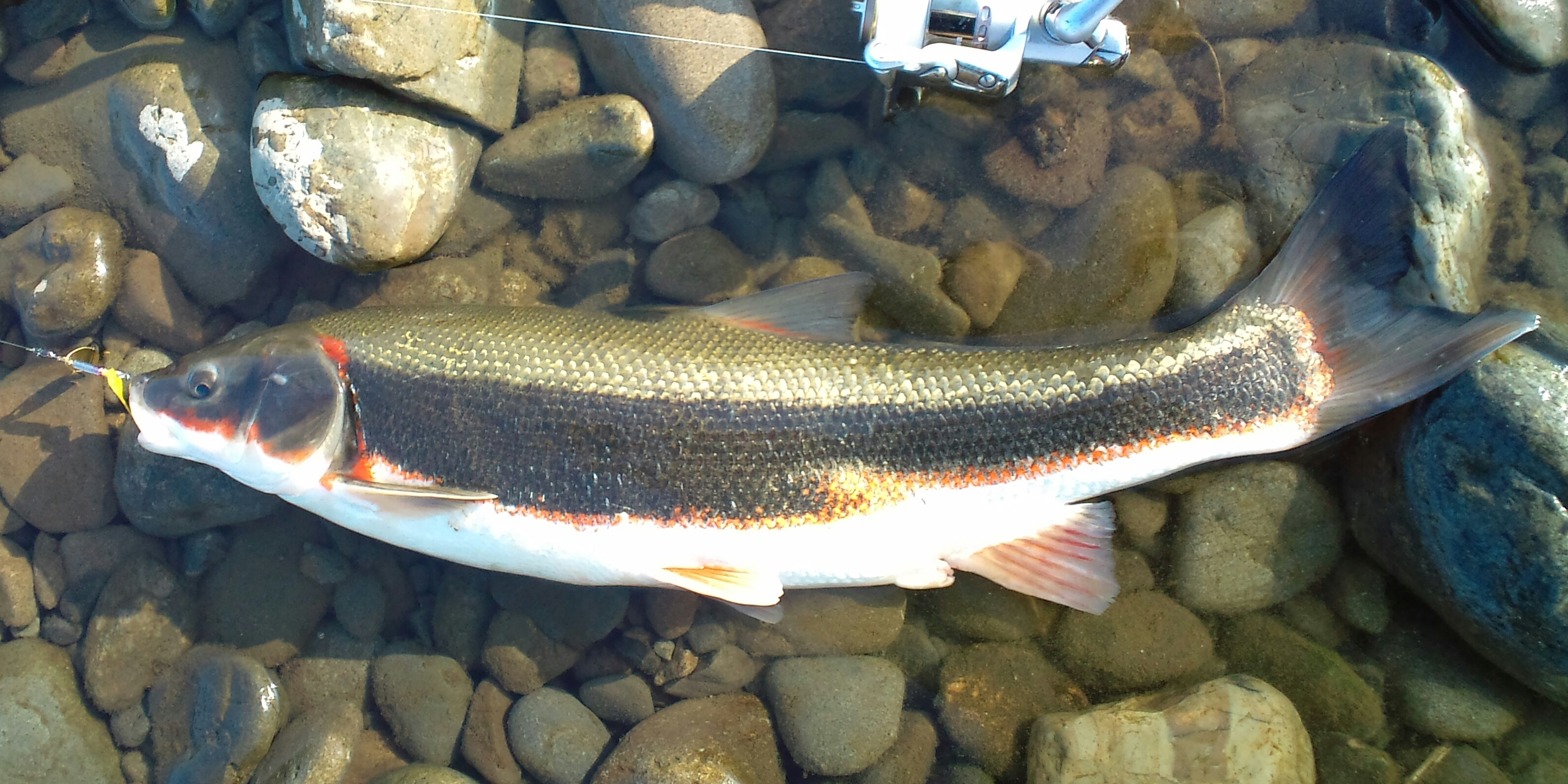
- Pseudaspius brandtii

Scientific classification
- Kingdom: Animalia
- Phylum: Chordata
- Class: Actinopterygii
- Order: Cypriniformes
- Family: Leuciscidae
- Subfamily: Pseudaspininae
- Genus: Pseudaspius; Dybowski, 1869

Type species
- Cyprinus leptocephalus Pallas, 1776

Synonyms
- Tribolodon Sauvage, 1883

= Pseudaspius =

Genus of fishes

Pseudaspius, the redfin daces, is a genus of ray-finned fishes belonging to the family Leuciscidae, which includes the daces, chubs, true minnows and related fishes. The fishes in this genus are found in marine and freshwater in eastern Asia, specifically the countries of Russia, Mongolia, China and Japan. Most species are diadromous into the Sea of Japan.

== Taxonomy ==
Pseudaspius was first proposed as a monospecific genus in 1869 by the Polish zoologist Benedykt Dybowski with Cyprinus leptocephalus as its only species. C. leptocephalus was first formally described in 1776 by the German zoologist Peter Simon Pallas with its type locality given as Transbaikal. The genus Triblodon is now considered to be a synonym of Pseudaspius. This genus is classified within the subfamily Pseudaspininae of the family Leuciscidae.

== Species ==
These are the currently recognized species in this genus.

- Pseudaspius brandtii (Dybowski, 1872) (Pacific redfin)
- Pseudaspius hakonensis (Günther, 1877) (Big-scale redfin)
- Pseudaspius leptocephalus (Pallas, 1776) (Redfin)
- Pseudaspius nakamurai (Doi & Shinzawa, 2000)
- Pseudaspius sachalinensis (Nikolskii, 1889)
