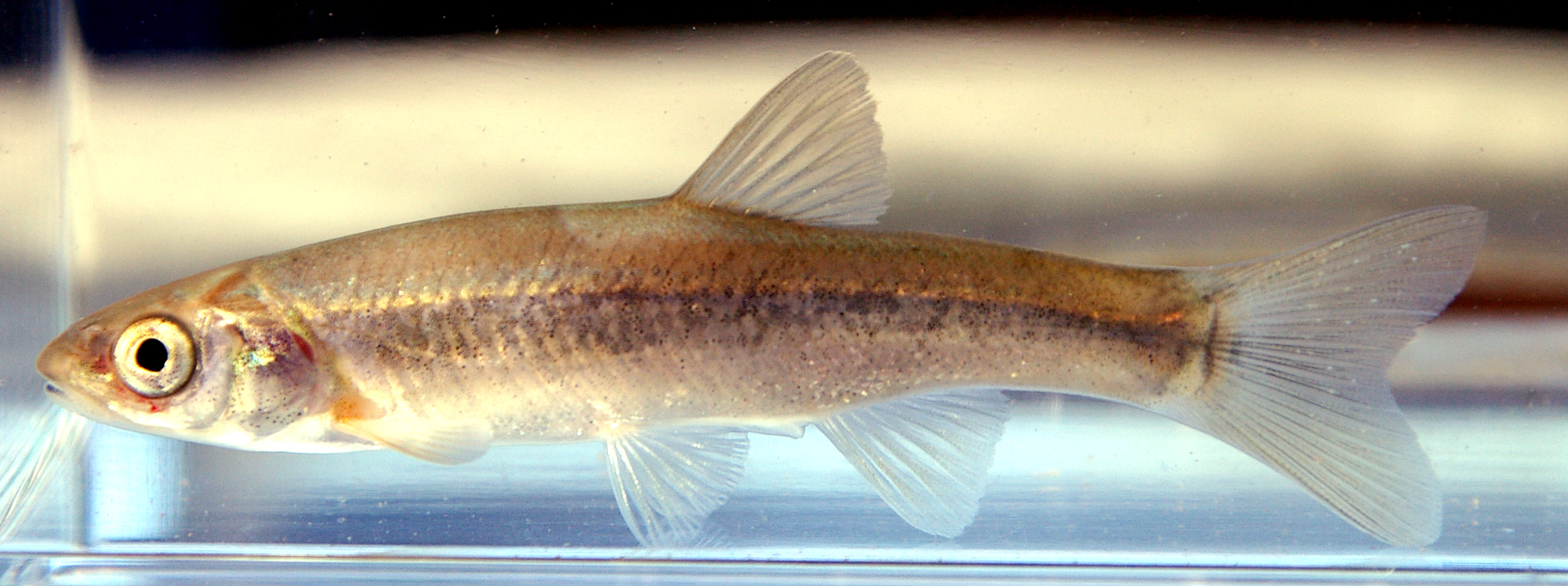
- Amur minnow (Rhynchocypris lagowskii)

Scientific classification
- Kingdom: Animalia
- Phylum: Chordata
- Class: Actinopterygii
- Division: Teleostei
- Order: Cypriniformes
- Family: Leuciscidae
- Subfamily: Pseudaspininae
- Genus: Rhynchocypris; Günther, 1889

Type species
- Rhynchocypris variegata Günther, 1889

Synonyms
- Czekanowskiella Dybowski, 1916; Eupallasella Dybowski, 1916; Lagowskiella Dybowski, 1916; Moroco Jordan & Hubbs, 1925

= Rhynchocypris =

Genus of fishes

Rhynchocypris is a genus of ray-finned fishes belonging to the family Leuciscidae, which includes the daces, chubs, true minnows and related fishes. These relatively small fishes are found in Eurasia.

== Species ==
Rhynchocypris contains the following valid species:

- Rhynchocypris czekanowskii (Dybowski, 1869) (Czekanowski's minnow)
- Rhynchocypris dementjevi (Turdakov & Piskarev, 1954)
- Rhynchocypris deogyuensis Lee & Sim, 2017 (Deogyu fat-minnow)
- Rhynchocypris keumkang (Chyung, 1977) (Fat minnow)
- Rhynchocypris lagowskii (Dybowski, 1869) (Amur minnow)
- Rhynchocypris mantschurica (Berg, 1907) (Manchurian Lake minnow)
- Rhynchocypris oxycephala (Sauvage & Dabry de Thiersant, 1874) (Chinese minnow)
- Rhynchocypris percnurus (Pallas, 1814) (Lake minnow)
- Rhynchocypris sachalinensis (Berg, 1907)
- Rhynchocypris semotilus (Jordan & Starks, 1905)
- Rhynchocypris steindachneri (Sauvage, 1883)

Synonyms

- Rhynchocypris jouyi (D. S. Jordan & Snyder, 1901); valid as R. oxycephala
