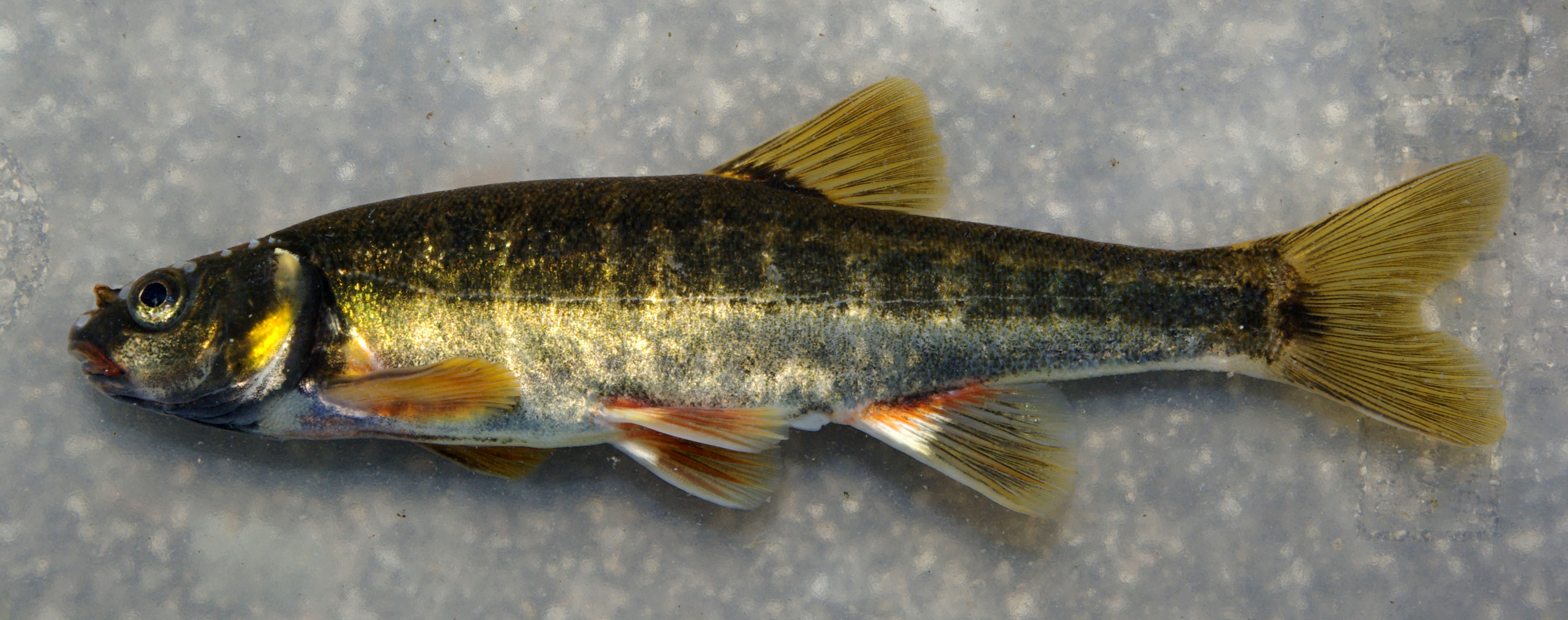

Conservation status
- Least Concern (IUCN 3.1)

Scientific classification
- Kingdom: Animalia
- Phylum: Chordata
- Class: Actinopterygii
- Order: Cypriniformes
- Family: Leuciscidae
- Subfamily: Phoxininae
- Genus: Phoxinus
- Species: P. bigerri

Binomial name
- Phoxinus bigerri Kottelat, 2007

= Phoxinus bigerri =

Species of fish

Phoxinus bigerri, the Adour minnow or Pyrenean minnow, is a species of freshwater ray-finned fish belonging to the family Leuciscidae, which includes the daces, minnows and related fishes. This fish is endemic to southwestern Europe.

== Taxonomy ==
Phoxinus bigerri was first formally described in 2007 by the Swiss ichthyologist Maurice Kottelat, with its type locality given as the River Adour in Séméac, Tarbes, in the Hautes-Pyrénées départment of France at 43°13'39"N, 0°05'27"E. Kottelat was studying the variation in populations of what were thought to be "common minnows", Phoxinus phoxinus sensu lato, and discovered that what had been thought to be a single widespread Palearctic species was, in fact, a species complex. This species is classified within the genus Phoxinus, the Eurasian minnows, within the monotypic subfamily Phoxininae of the family Leuciscidae.

== Etymology ==
Phoxinus bigerri belongs to the genus Phoxinus. This name is derived from the Greek phoxinos, meaning "small fishes". In 1553, Pierre Belon used it to refer to the fishes known as minnows in English, and Carl Linnaeus used it as the specific name of a fish in 1758, which Constantine Samuel Rafinesque applied tautologically to the genus of minnows in 1820, its only species being Phoxinus phoxinus. The specific name, bigerri, refers to the Bigerri, a Gaulish people who lived in the Adour Valley.

== Description ==
Phoxinus bigerri is identified from other European members of the genus Phoxinus by the origin of the anal fin being placed below or to the rear of the last dorsal fin ray. In adults, the anal fin is almost equal in length to the caudal peduncle, and it has a straight to convex margin. The dorsal profile of the head is nearly horizontal over the eye, then sharply descends near the tip of the snout. The breast has patches of scales which are surrounded by scale-less regions, or they may be joined at the anterior end by one or two rows of scales. The lateral line typically extends to near the end of the caudal peduncle. In the largest specimens there is a clear hump on the nape. The maximum standard length of this fish is 6.6 cm (2.6 in).

== Distribution and habitat ==
Phoxinus bigerri is found in southwestern Europe in rivers which drain into the Bay of Biscay. The western limit of its range is in the Esva River in Asturias in Spain, east into France, where it is nataive to the drainage systems of the Eyre and Adour river systems, and in the upper drainage of the Ebro. It has been introduced to Galicia in the Duero and Da Chanca rivers, and to the Aude in France. The Pyrenean minnow prefers relatively shallow shorelines, pools and smoother stretches of rivers with well-oxygenated, clear water, and which have a slow to moderate current.
