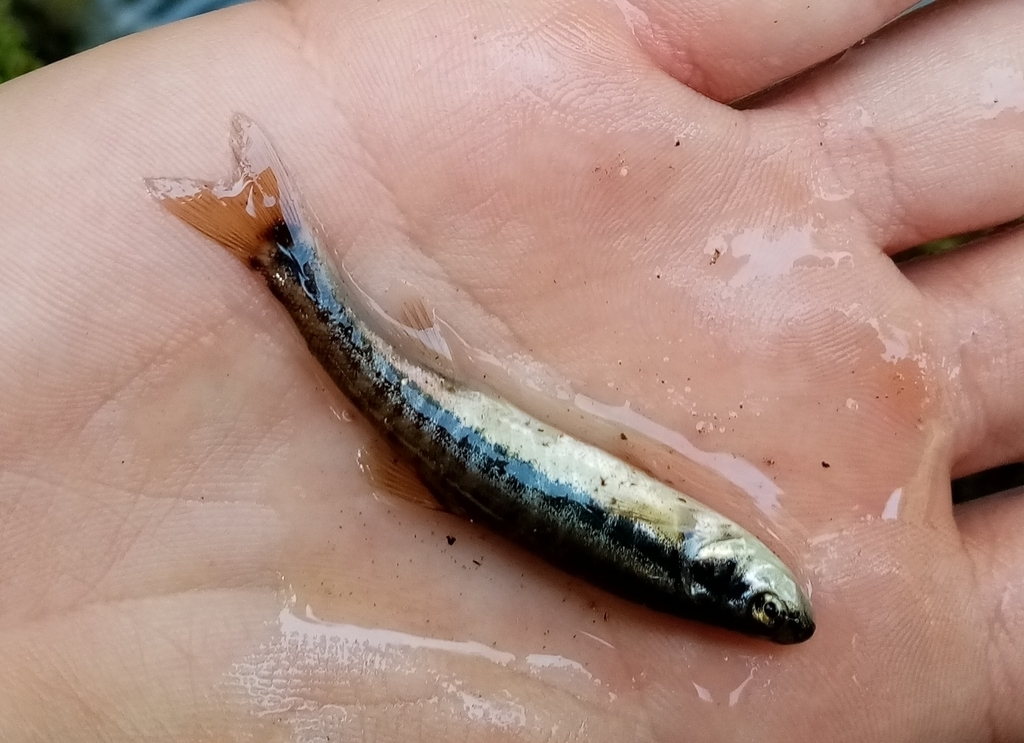

Conservation status
- Endangered (IUCN 3.1)

Scientific classification
- Kingdom: Animalia
- Phylum: Chordata
- Class: Actinopterygii
- Order: Cypriniformes
- Family: Leuciscidae
- Subfamily: Phoxininae
- Genus: Phoxinus
- Species: P. strymonicus

Binomial name
- Phoxinus strymonicus Kottelat, 2007

= Phoxinus strymonicus =

Species of fish

Phoxinus strymonicus, the Aegean minnow, is a species of freshwater ray-finned fish belonging to the family Leuciscidae, which includes the daces, minnows and related fishes. This fish is endemic to northeastern Greece.

== Taxonomy ==
Phoxinus strymonicus was first formally described in 2007 by the Swiss ichthyologist Maurice Kottelat, with its type locality given as "Strymon drainage, Angitis system, canals near Kalambaki, about 14 kilometers south of Drama, Macedonia, Greece". Kottelat was studying the variation in populations of what were thought to be common minnows, Phoxinus phoxinus sensu lato, and discovered that what had been thought to be a single widespread Palearctic species was, in fact, a species complex. This species is classified within the genus Phoxinus, the Eurasian minnows, within the monotypic subfamily Phoxininae of the family Leuciscidae.

== Etymology ==
Phoxinus strymonicus belongs to the genus Phoxinus. This name is derived from the Greek phoxinos, meaning "small fishes". In 1553 Pierre Belon used it to refer to the fishes known as minnows in English and Carl Linnaeus used it as the specific name of a fish in 1758, which Constantine Samuel Rafinesque applied tautologically to the genus of minnows in 1820, its only species being Phoxinus phoxinus. The specific name, strymonicus, refers to the Struma or Strymon River in Greece, the type locality.

== Description ==
Phoxinus strymonicus is identified from other European members of the genus Phoxinus by the having only small patches of scales on the breast, or their absence. The origin of the anal fin is in front of the base of the last dorsal fin ray. This is a small fish with a maximum standard length of 4.2 cm (1.7 in),

== Distribution and habitat ==
Phoxinus strymonicus is endemic to the lower Strymon River system, where it occurs in the Agitis River and the adjacent Marmaras River in northeastern Greece. It can be found among dense vegetation in shallow water in small creeks fed with spring water, and in canals in cultivated areas. It is most abundant in small streams that have clear and cold water.
