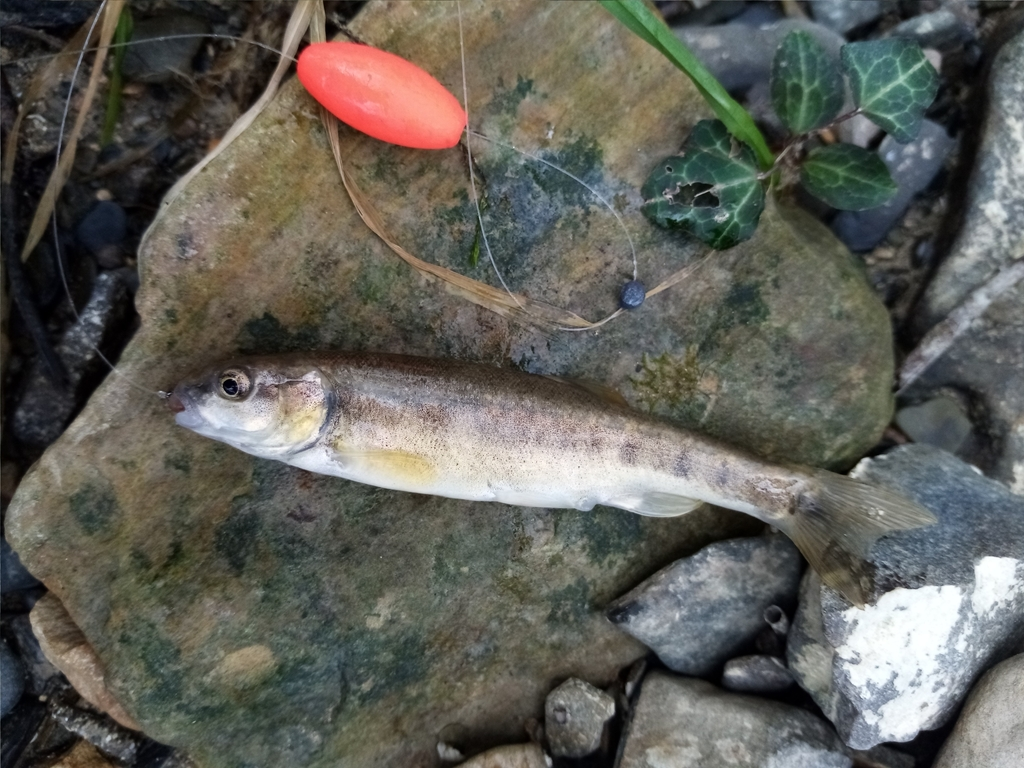

Conservation status
- Least Concern (IUCN 3.1)

Scientific classification
- Kingdom: Animalia
- Phylum: Chordata
- Class: Actinopterygii
- Division: Teleostei
- Order: Cypriniformes
- Family: Leuciscidae
- Subfamily: Phoxininae
- Genus: Phoxinus
- Species: P. colchicus

Binomial name
- Phoxinus colchicus Berg, 1910

= Phoxinus colchicus =

Species of fish

Phoxinus colchicus is a species of freshwater ray-finned fish belonging to the family Leuciscidae, which includes the daces, minnows and related fishes. This fish is endemic to the southern tributaries of the lower Kuban River of Russia and Georgia.

== Taxonomy ==
Phoxinus colchicus was first formally described in 1910 as the subspecies colchicus of the "common minnow" Phoxinus phoxinus by the Russian geographer and biologist Lev Semyonovich Berg, with its type locality given as the Bachvis Tzchali river in the Ozurgety District of Georgia. Studies of the "common minnow" in the late 20th and 21st centuries had shown that what had been thought to be a single widespread Palearctic species was, in fact, a species complex. This means that this taxon is now considered to be a valid species within the genus Phoxinus, the only genus in the monotypic subfamily Phoxininae of the family Leuciscidae.

== Etymology ==
Phoxinus colchicus belongs to the genus Phoxinus. This name is derived from the Greek phoxinos, meaning "small fishes". In 1553 Pierre Belon used it to refer to the fishes known as minnows in English, and Carl Linnaeus used it as the specific name of a fish in 1758, which Constantine Samuel Rafinesque applied tautologically to the genus of minnows in 1820, its only species being Phoxinus phoxinus. The specific name, colchicus, means "belonging to Colchis", the historic name for the Black Sea coastal region of Georgia.

== Description ==
Phoxinus colchicus has 3 spines and 9 soft rays, althouygh the last spine is only half the length of the others, in both its dorsal and anal fins. The maximum standard length for this fish is 8.2 cm (3.2 in).

== Distribution and habitat ==
Phoxinus colchicus is found in the southern tributaries of the Kuban River in southern Russia and Georgia, as well as in northeastern Turkey in the Hopa River. It has a wide habitat preference, but does prefer cooler, well oxygenated water, ranging from small streams with swift currents up to large rivers.

== Biology ==
Phoxinus colchicus uses clean gravel areas in flowing water for spawning between April and July, when the females lay sticky eggs into the gravel. They are gregarious, spawning in shoals. Their diet consists of invertebrates, algae and detritus.
