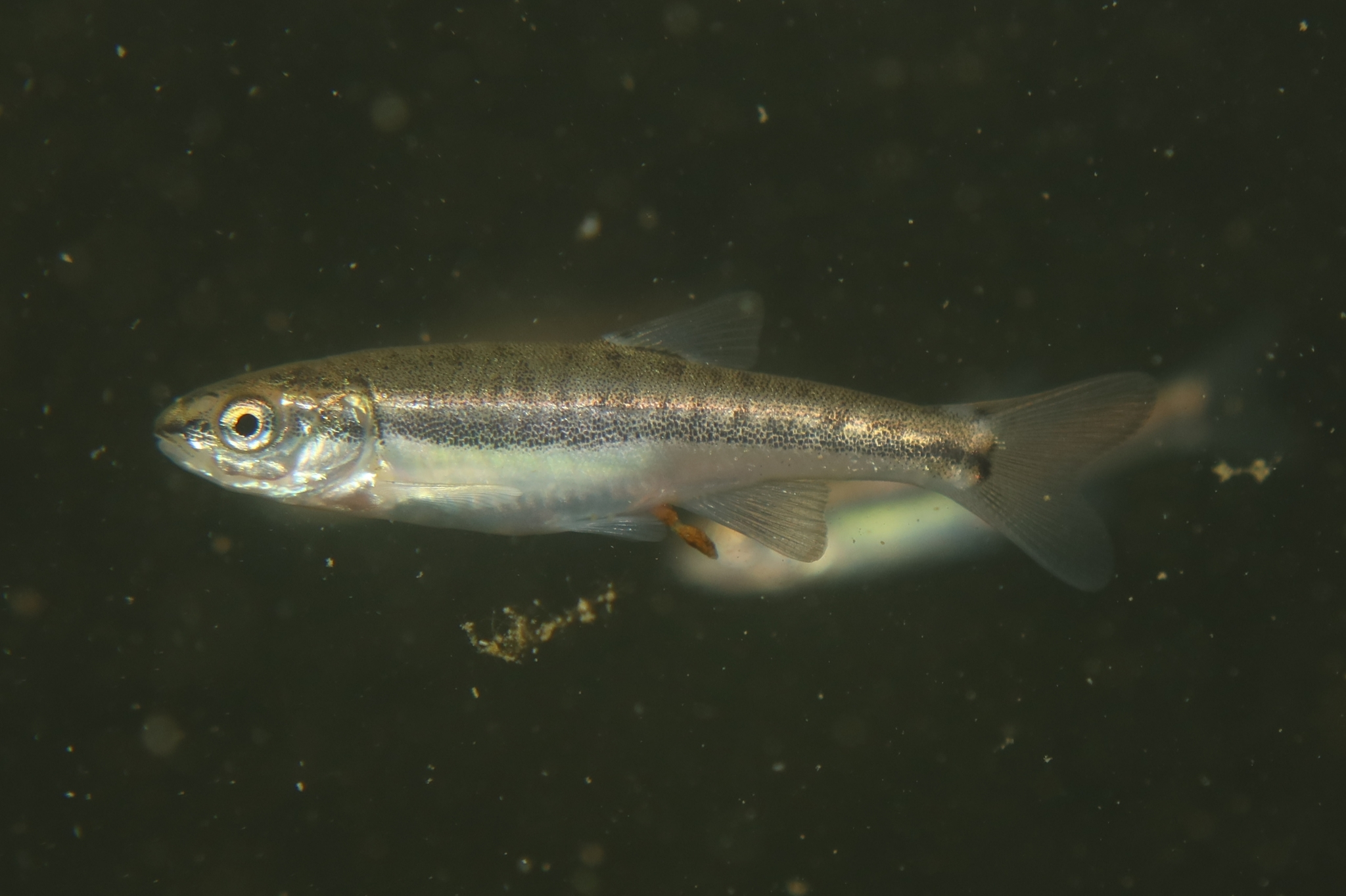
- Phoxinus septimaniae from the Hérault river, France

Conservation status
- Least Concern (IUCN 3.1)

Scientific classification
- Kingdom: Animalia
- Phylum: Chordata
- Class: Actinopterygii
- Order: Cypriniformes
- Family: Leuciscidae
- Subfamily: Phoxininae
- Genus: Phoxinus
- Species: P. septimaniae

Binomial name
- Phoxinus septimaniae Kottelat, 2007

= Phoxinus septimaniae =

Species of fish

Phoxinus septimaniae, the Languedoc minnow, is a species of freshwater ray-finned fish belonging to the family Leuciscidae, which includes the daces, minnows and related fishes. This fish is endemic to southwestern Europe.

== Taxonomy ==
Phoxinus septimaniae was first formally described in 2007 by the Swiss ichthyologist Maurice Kottelat, with its type locality given as the River Agly at a bridge downstream of Latour-de-France at 42°46'09"N, 2°39'39"E, in the Départment of Pyrénées-Orientales in France. Kottelat was studying the variation in populations of what were thought to be "common minnows", Phoxinus phoxinus sensu lato, and discovered that what had been thought to be a single widespread Palearctic species was, in fact, a species complex. This species is classified within the genus Phoxinus, the Eurasian minnows, within the monotypic subfamily Phoxininae of the family Leuciscidae.

== Etymology ==
Phoxinus septimaniae belongs to the genus Phoxinus. This name is derived from the Greek phoxinos, meaning "small fishes". In 1553, Pierre Belon used it to refer to the fishes known as minnows in English, and Carl Linnaeus used it as the specific name of a fish in 1758, which Constantine Samuel Rafinesque applied tautologically to the genus of minnows in 1820, its only species being Phoxinus phoxinus. The specific name, septimaniae, refers to the Septimania, a region of the Roman province of Gallia Narbonensis which roughly corresponds to the modern Languedoc-Roussillon region in which this minnow is found.

== Description ==
Phoxinus septimaniae can be identified from other European mimmows by having continuous scale patches across its breast and a lateral line which extends to the base of the anal fin. There is an indistinct stripe along the sides, and the upper body is goldish bronze with a few dark vermiculations. The maximum standard length of this fish is 6.4 cm (2.5 in).

== Distribution and habitat ==
Phoxinus septimaniae is found in southwestern Europe, in rivers draining into the Mediterranean Sea, including the Rhône, south to the Ravane River. It is found in northeastern Spain as well, where it may be native. There are introduced populations in Italy, France and Germany. This fish occurs in small streams with cold, oxygen-rich, clear water over gravel to stone substrates.

== Gallery ==
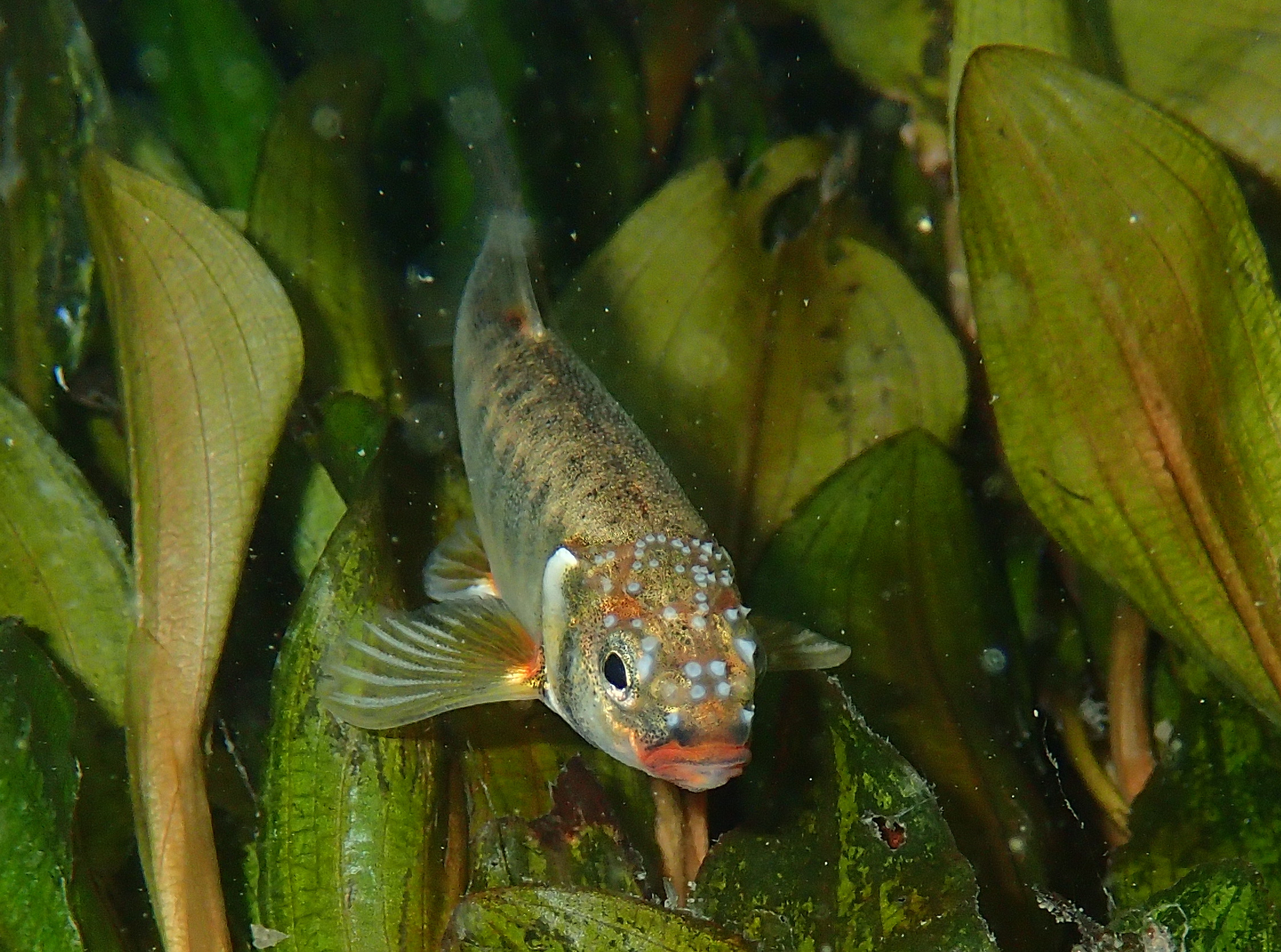
Showing tubercles on head

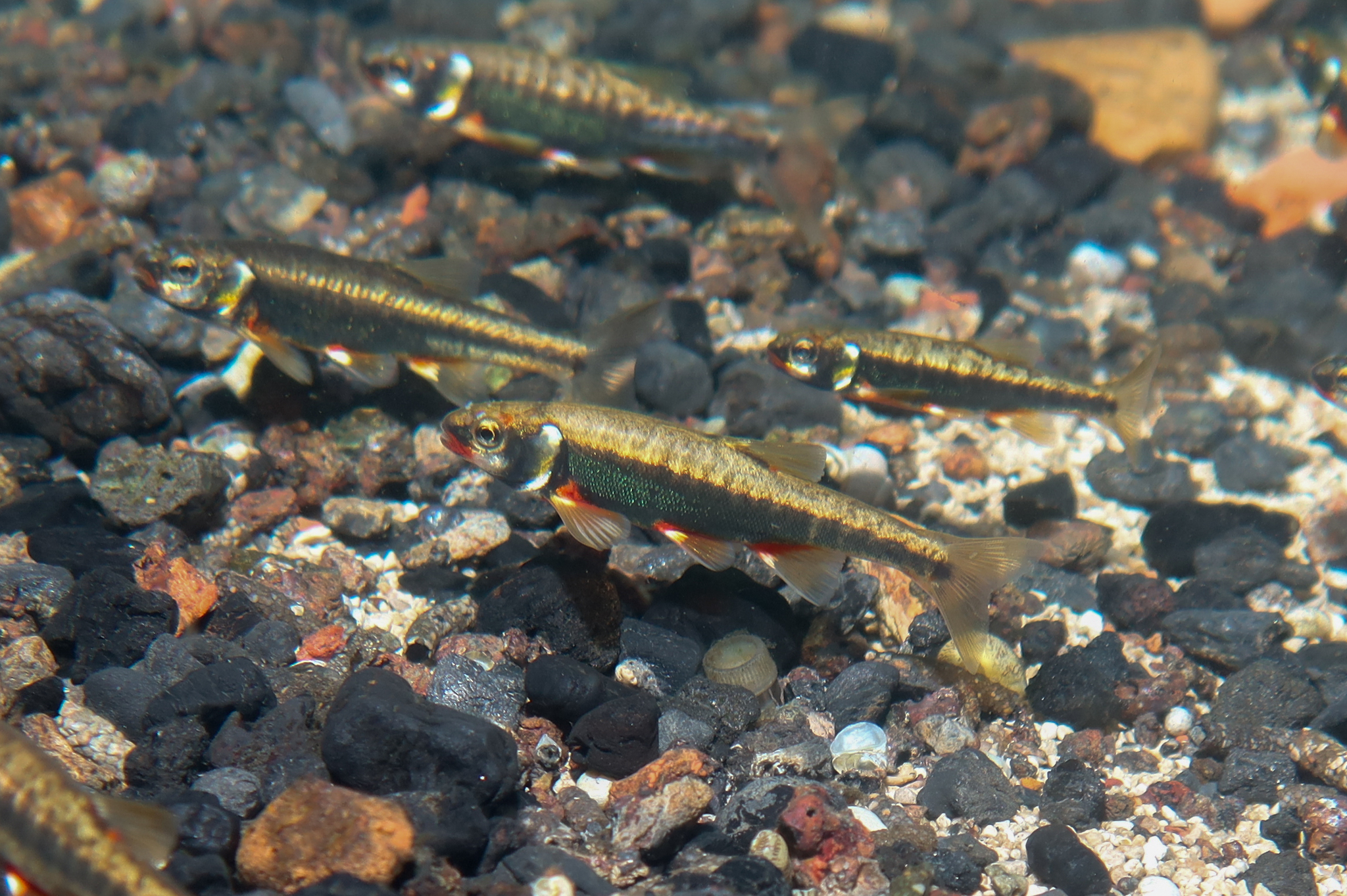
Reproductive colouration

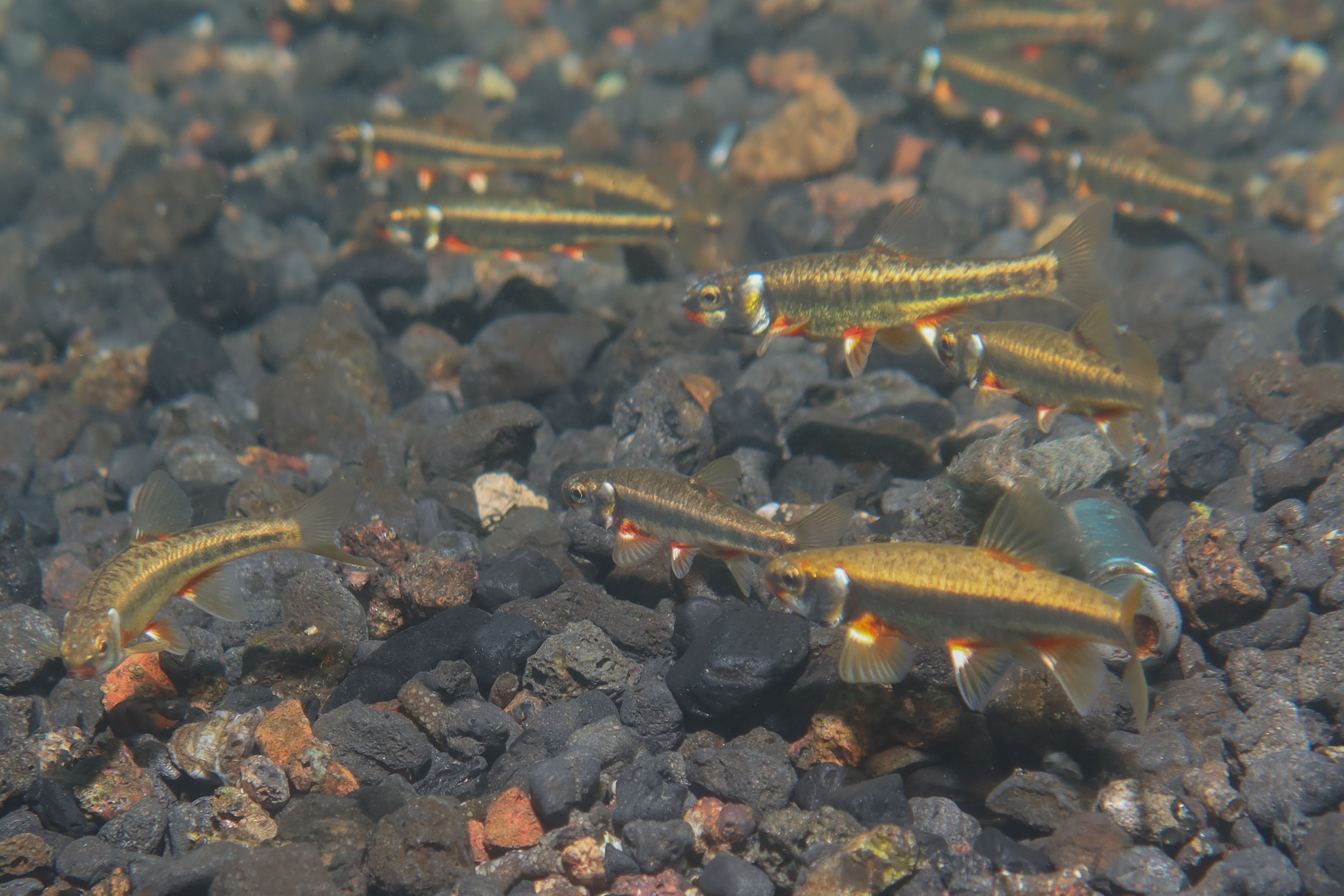
Reproductive colouration

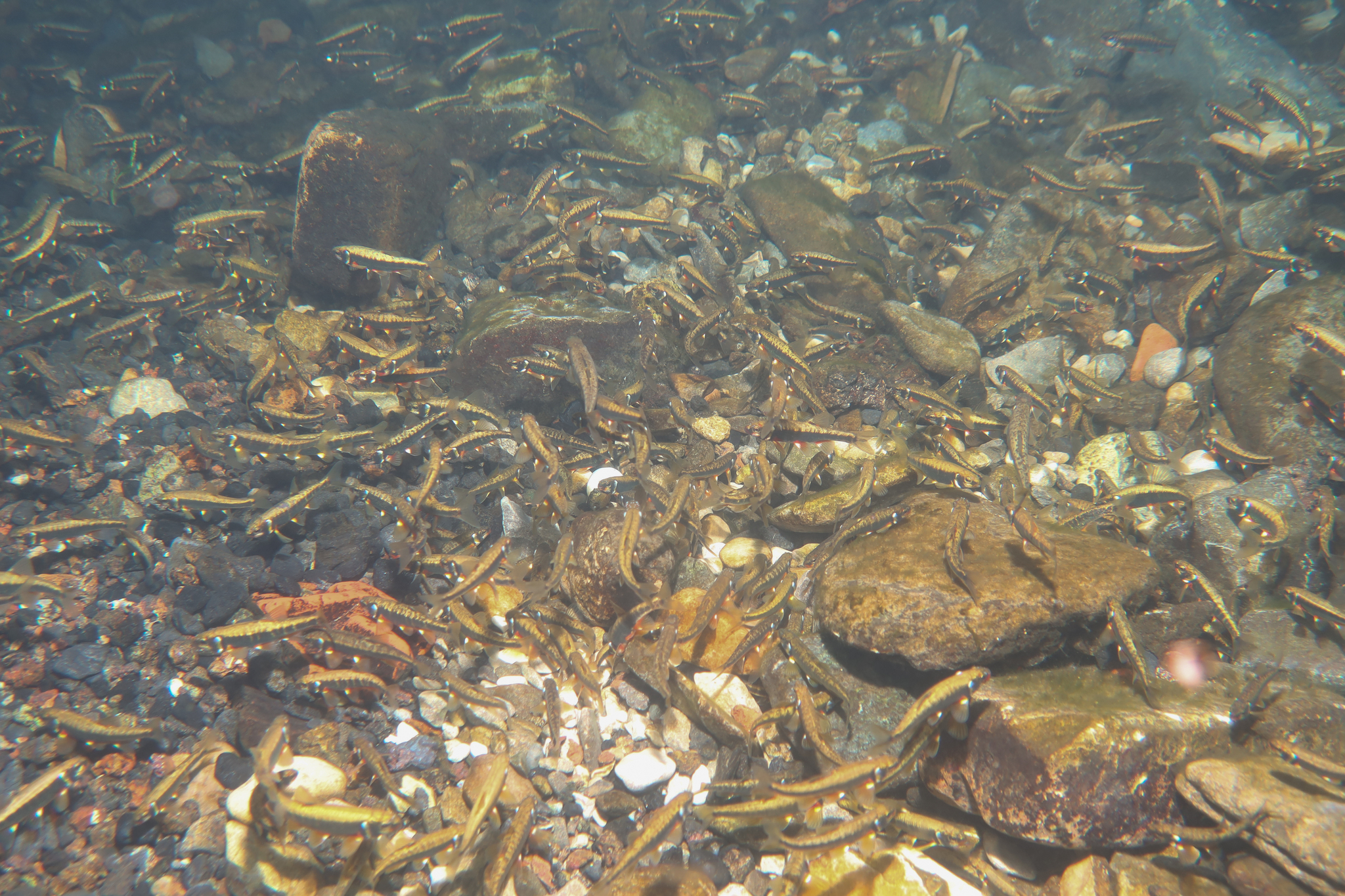
Aggregation
