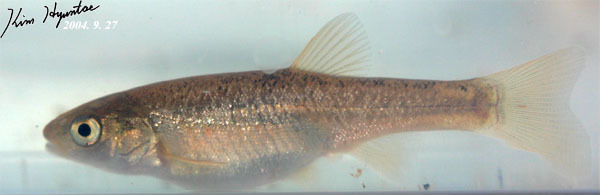
- Nominate form
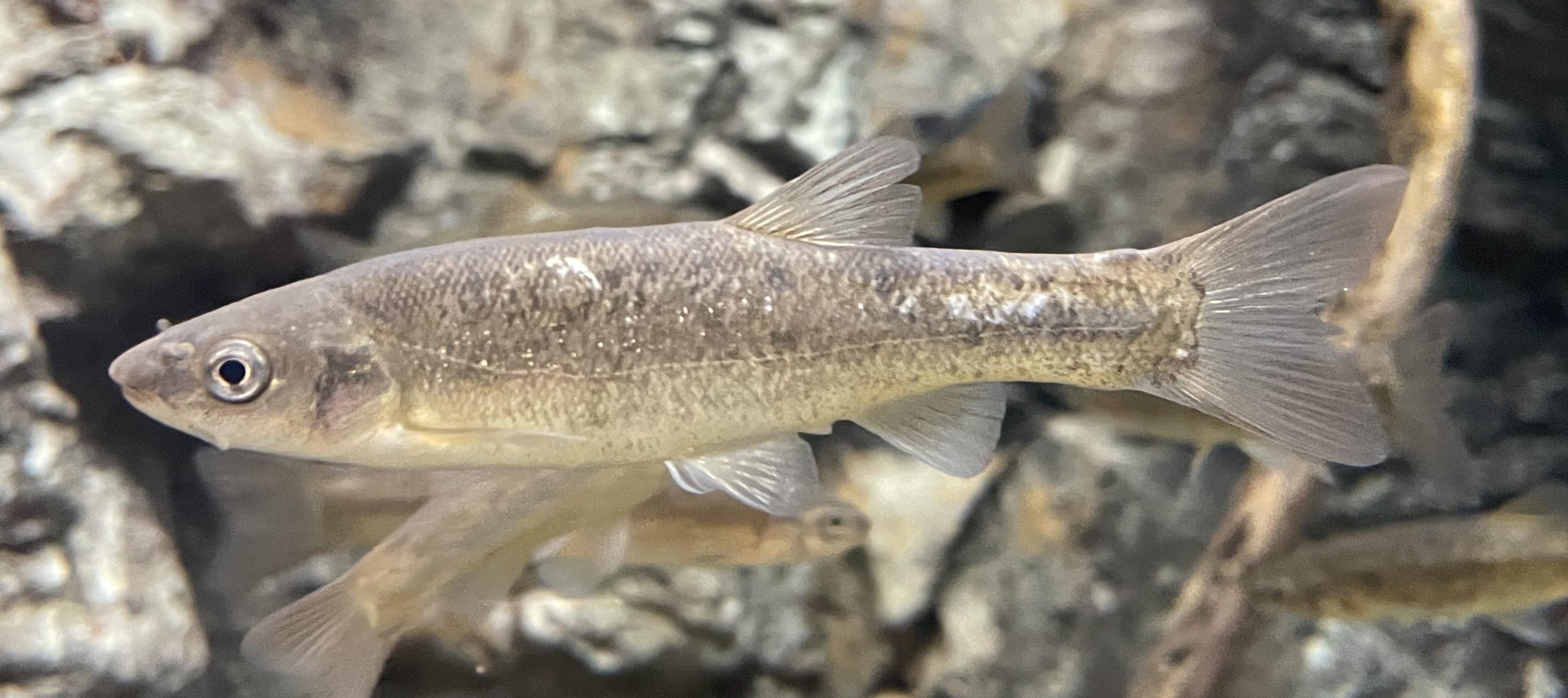
- Subspecies jouyi

Conservation status
- Least Concern (IUCN 3.1)

Scientific classification
- Kingdom: Animalia
- Phylum: Chordata
- Class: Actinopterygii
- Division: Teleostei
- Order: Cypriniformes
- Family: Leuciscidae
- Subfamily: Pseudaspininae
- Genus: Rhynchocypris
- Species: R. oxycephala

Binomial name
- Rhynchocypris oxycephala (Sauvage & Dabry de Thiersant, 1874)

Synonyms
- Rhynchocypris oxycephalus (Sauvage & Dabry de Thiersant 1874); Pseudophoxinus oxycephalus Sauvage & Dabry de Thiersant, 1874; Phoxinus oxycephalus (Sauvage & Dabry de Thiersant 1874); Leuciscus costatus Fowler, 1899; Pseudaspius modestus D. S. Jordan & Metz, 1913; Moroco variegatus septentrionalis Mori, 1930; Phoxinus czekanowskii suifunensis Berg, 1932; Rhynchocypris variegata Günther, 1889

= Chinese minnow =

Species of fish

The Chinese minnow (Rhynchocypris oxycephala) is a species of freshwater ray-finned fish belonging to the family Leuciscidae, which includes the daces, chubs, true minnows and related fishes. It is found from the Amur river in the north to the Yangtze in China in the south.

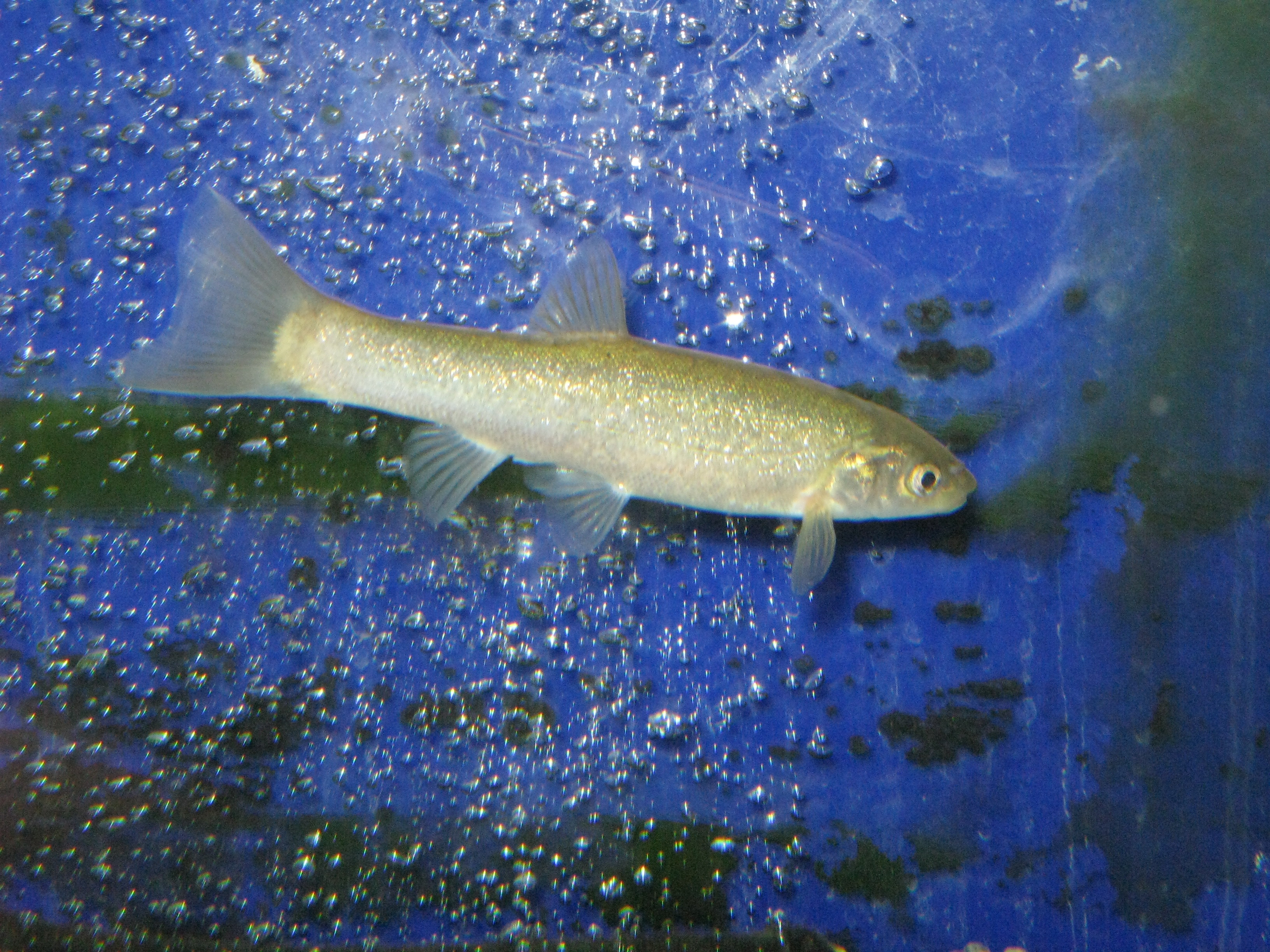
