= Balkhash minnow =

Conservation status
- Least Concern (IUCN 3.1)

Scientific classification
- Kingdom: Animalia
- Phylum: Chordata
- Class: Actinopterygii
- Order: Cypriniformes
- Family: Leuciscidae
- Subfamily: Phoxininae
- Genus: Phoxinus
- Species: P. poljakowii

Binomial name
- Phoxinus poljakowii Kessler, 1879

Synonyms
- Rhynchocypris poljakowii (Kessler, 1879)

Species of fish

The Balkhash minnow (Phoxinus poljakowii) is a species of ray-finned fish belonging to the family Leuciscidae, which includes the daces, chubs, true minnows and related fishes. This small fish, with a maximum total length of 10 cm (3.9 in), is found in Xinjiang in China and in Kazakhstan and Kyrgyzstan.
