= Phoxinus issykkulensis =

Conservation status
- Least Concern (IUCN 3.1)

Scientific classification
- Kingdom: Animalia
- Phylum: Chordata
- Class: Actinopterygii
- Order: Cypriniformes
- Family: Leuciscidae
- Subfamily: Phoxininae
- Genus: Phoxinus
- Species: P. issykkulensis

Binomial name
- Phoxinus issykkulensis Berg, 1912

Species of fish

Phoxinus issykkulensis, the Issyk-kul' minnow, is a species of freshwater ray-finned fish belonging to the family Leuciscidae, the shiners, daces and minnows. It is found in Asia, where it has a localised distribution in slow flowing, shallow rivers and in springs in the basin of Issyk-Kul lake in Kyrgyzstan.
