= Phoxinus karsticus =

Conservation status
- Least Concern (IUCN 3.1)

Scientific classification
- Kingdom: Animalia
- Phylum: Chordata
- Class: Actinopterygii
- Order: Cypriniformes
- Family: Leuciscidae
- Subfamily: Phoxininae
- Genus: Phoxinus
- Species: P. karsticus

Binomial name
- Phoxinus karsticus Bianco & De Bonis, 2015

Synonyms
- Phoxinus apollonicus Bianco & De Bonis, 2015

Species of fish

Phoxinus karsticus, the Karst minnow, is a species of freshwater ray-finned fish belonging to Phoxinus genus of the family Leuciscidae, which includes the daces, minnows and related fishes. This fish is endemic to the Balkan Peninsula in southeastern Europe.

== Taxonomy ==
Phoxinus karsticus was first formally described in 2015 by the Italian biologists Pier Giorgio Bianco and Salvatore De Bonis, with its type locality given as the Trebišnjica river, an endorheic river, near Jasenica in Bosnia-Herzegovina. This species is classified within the genus Phoxinus, the Eurasian minnows, within the monotypic subfamily Phoxininae of the family Leuciscidae.

== Etymology ==
Phoxinus karsticus belongs to the genus Phoxinus. This name is derived from the Greek phoxinos, meaning "small fishes". In 1553, Pierre Belon used it to refer to the fishes known as minnows in English, and Carl Linnaeus used it as the specific name of a fish in 1758, which Constantine Samuel Rafinesque applied tautologically to the genus of minnows in 1820, its only species being Phoxinus phoxinus. The specific name, karsticus, means "belonging to Karst", the type locality in the Karstic Popovo Polje and Trebišnjica endorheic river system of Bosnia-Herzegovina.

== Description ==
Phoxinus karsticus has 10 or 11 soft rays in its dorsal fin, and 10 in its anal fin. It can be told apart from similar minnows in Italy and the Western Balkans by the possession of a lateral line with between 81 and 86 scales in a horizontal line, a higher number than geographically close congeners. The number of scales around the caudal peduncle is also different; in this species, it is between 40 and 42. The horizontal banding on the holotype is reduced or discoloured in preservation. All the specimens show patches of scales on the breast which are joined together at their anterior ends. This species has a maximum standard length of 7.2 cm (2.8 in), and a total length of 9.1 cm (3.6 in) has been recorded.

== Distribution and habitat ==
Phoxinus karsticus is endemic to the southeastern Dinaric Karst region of the Western Balkans. It is found in Albania, Bosnia-Herzegovina and Montenegro. This is a species of karstic poljes, depressed flat plains surrounded by limestone ridges. Seasonal sinking rivers and springs rise around the edges of these isolated basins and flow across the basins until they submerge into ponors to flow through underground karstic conduits, to emerge and join rivers at lower altitudes.

== Biology ==
Phoxinus karsticus is a gregarious fish, feeding mostly on aquatic invertebrates and some algae and detritus. They attain sexual maturity at ages greater than one year, and it may be in excess of three years old. The spawning season runs from March up to July. To spawn, the adults migrate to spawning sites, which are typically clean gravel beds or well vegetated stretches. The males develop a breeding colour pattern and migrate to the spawning sites in advance of the arrival of the females.
