= Phoxinus grumi =

Scientific classification
- Kingdom: Animalia
- Phylum: Chordata
- Class: Actinopterygii
- Order: Cypriniformes
- Family: Leuciscidae
- Subfamily: Phoxininae
- Genus: Phoxinus
- Species: P. grumi

Binomial name
- Phoxinus grumi Berg, 1907

Species of fish

Phoxinus grumi is a species of freshwater ray-finned fish belonging to the family Leuciscidae, the shiners, daces and minnows. It is endemic to China.

== Genomics ==
A chromosomal-level genome assembly of P. grumi was published in 2026. The assembled genome has a size of approximately 900 Mb, with 97.6% of the sequence anchored to 25 chromosomes and an estimated completeness of 98.1% based on BUSCO analysis. A total of 24,224 protein-coding genes were predicted, most of which were functionally annotated. This genomic resource is expected to support studies of adaptation and conservation genetics in this species.
