= Phoxinus oxyrhynchus =

Conservation status
- Least Concern (IUCN 3.1)

Scientific classification
- Kingdom: Animalia
- Phylum: Chordata
- Class: Actinopterygii
- Order: Cypriniformes
- Family: Leuciscidae
- Genus: Phoxinus
- Species: P. oxyrhynchus

Binomial name
- Phoxinus oxyrhynchus (Mori, 1930)

Synonyms
- Moroco oxyrhynchus Mori, 1930; Rhynchocypris oxyrhynchus (Mori, 1930)

Species of fish

Phoxinus oxyrhynchus or Primorsky Minnow is a species of freshwater ray-finned fish belonging to the family Leuciscidae, the shiners, daces and minnows. It is native to the Korean peninsula, China and Russia. The species' specific name derives from the Ancient Greek words ὀξύς (romanized: oxýs, meaning 'sharp' or 'pointed') and ῥύγχος (romanized: rhýnchos, meaning 'snout' or 'beak'), with the generic name being a derivative of the word φοξός (romanized: phoxos, meaning 'pointed' or 'tapered'). This name references the characteristic long, sharp nose that the fish has.
