= Phoxinus brachyurus =

Conservation status
- Vulnerable (IUCN 3.1)

Scientific classification
- Kingdom: Animalia
- Phylum: Chordata
- Class: Actinopterygii
- Order: Cypriniformes
- Family: Leuciscidae
- Subfamily: Phoxininae
- Genus: Phoxinus
- Species: P. brachyurus

Binomial name
- Phoxinus brachyurus Berg, 1912

Species of fish

Phoxinus brachyurus, the Seven River's minnow, is a species of freshwater ray-finned fish belonging to the family Leuciscidae, the shiners, daces and minnows. This species is found in small lakes and springs in the southern part of the drainage basin of Lake Balkhash and Lake Alakol, particularly in the drainage system of the Ili River, in Kazakhstan. It has a highly localised and restricted distribution. This small fish has a maximum published total length of 8.4 cm (3.3 in).
