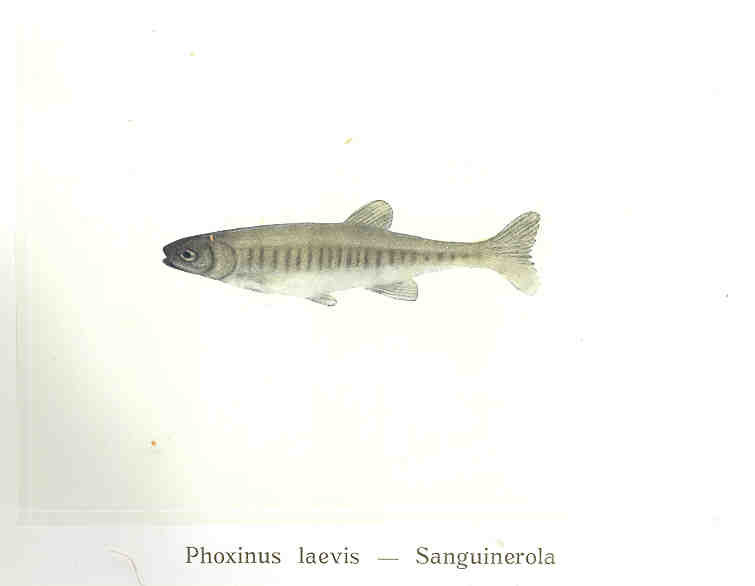

Scientific classification
- Domain: Eukaryota
- Kingdom: Animalia
- Phylum: Chordata
- Class: Actinopterygii
- Order: Cypriniformes
- Family: Leuciscidae
- Subfamily: Phoxininae
- Genus: Phoxinus
- Species: P. ujmonensis

Binomial name
- Phoxinus ujmonensis Kaschenko, 1899

= Phoxinus ujmonensis =

Species of fish

Phoxinus ujmonensis is a species of freshwater fish in the family Leuciscidae. It is found in Russia, Kazakhstan, Mongolia, and China.
