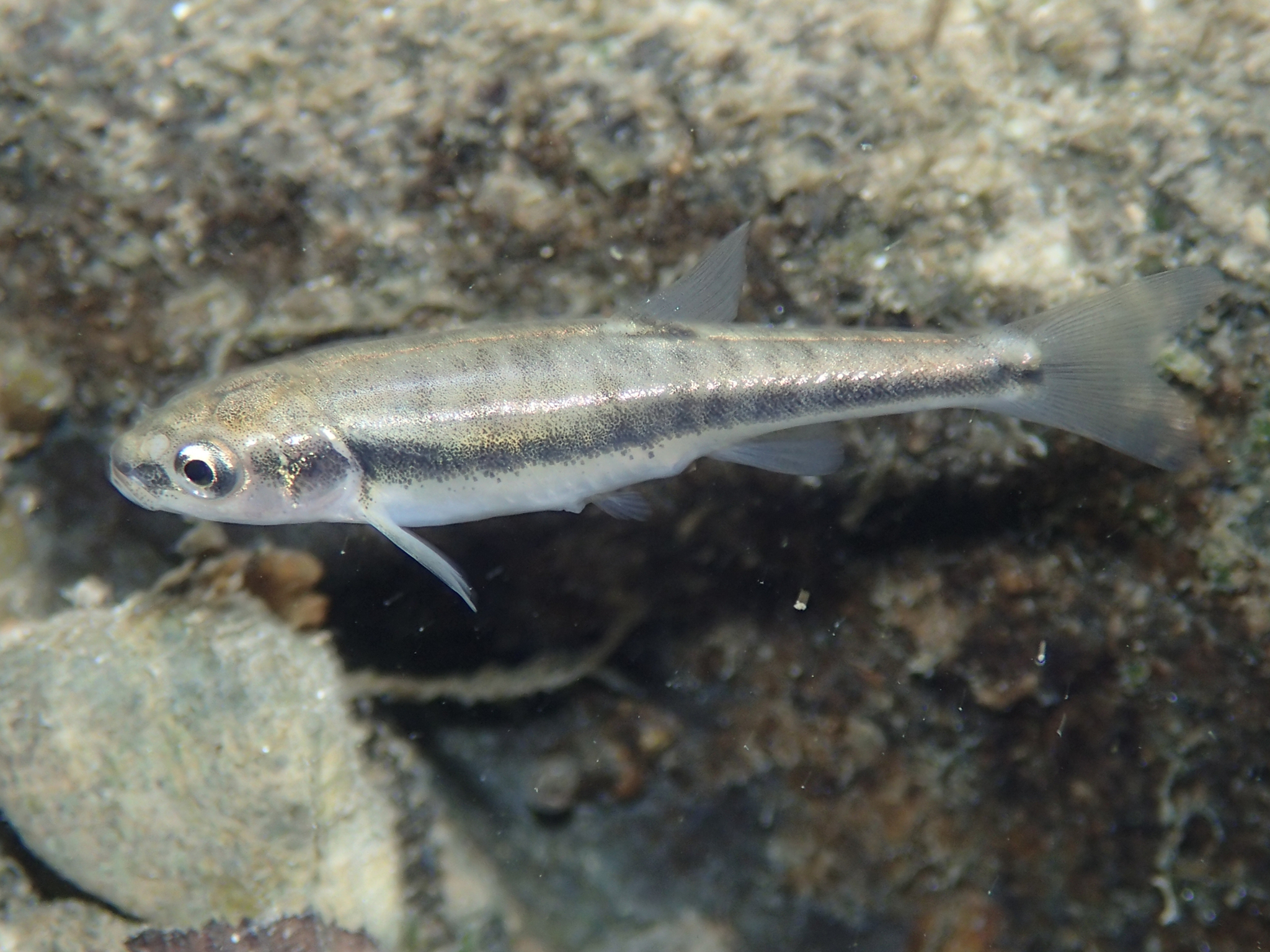

Scientific classification
- Kingdom: Animalia
- Phylum: Chordata
- Class: Actinopterygii
- Order: Cypriniformes
- Family: Leuciscidae
- Subfamily: Phoxininae
- Genus: Phoxinus
- Species: P. lumaireul

Binomial name
- Phoxinus lumaireul (Schinz, 1840)

Synonyms
- Cyprinus lumaireul Schinz, 1840; Phoxinus likai Bianco & De Bonis, 2015; Phoxinus ketmaieri Bianco & De Bonis, 2015

= Phoxinus lumaireul =

Species of fish

Phoxinus lumaireul is a species of freshwater ray-finned fish belonging to the family Leuciscidae, which includes the daces, minnows and related fishes. This species is found in rivers draining into the North Adriatic Sea and in the middle Danube catchment, in Italy, Slovenia, Croatia and Bosnia and Herzegovina. It reaches a length of 4.9 cm (1.9 in).
