= Phoxinus tchangi =

Scientific classification
- Kingdom: Animalia
- Phylum: Chordata
- Class: Actinopterygii
- Order: Cypriniformes
- Family: Leuciscidae
- Subfamily: Phoxininae
- Genus: Phoxinus
- Species: P. tchangi

Binomial name
- Phoxinus tchangi X. Y. Chen, 1988

Species of fish

Phoxinus tchangi is a species of freshwater fish in the family Leuciscidae. It is endemic to China.
