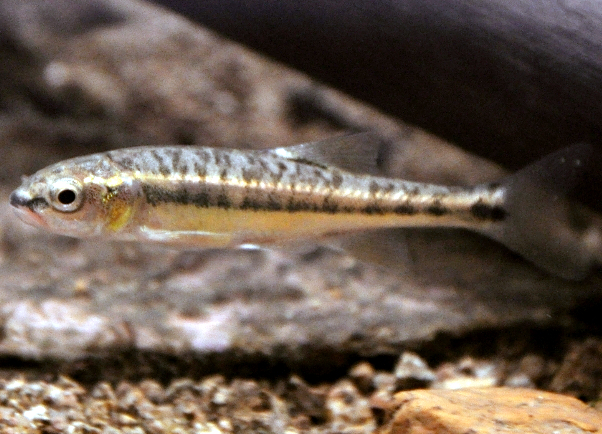

Conservation status
- Least Concern (IUCN 3.1)

Scientific classification
- Kingdom: Animalia
- Phylum: Chordata
- Class: Actinopterygii
- Division: Teleostei
- Order: Cypriniformes
- Family: Leuciscidae
- Subfamily: Phoxininae
- Genus: Phoxinus
- Species: P. phoxinus

Binomial name
- Phoxinus phoxinus (Linnaeus, 1758)

Synonyms
- Cyprinus phoxinus Linnaeus, 1758; Cyprinus aphya Linnaeus, 1758; Salmo rivularis Pallas, 1773; Cyprinus rivularis (Pallas, 1773); Cyprinus morella Leske, 1774; Cyprinus galian Gmelin, 1789; Phoxinus laevis Fitzinger, 1832; Phoxinus varius Perty, 1832; Phoxinus laevis var. balchaschana Kessler, 1879; Phoxinus phoxinus carpathicus Popescu Gorj & Dimitriu, 1950

= Phoxinus phoxinus =

Species of fish

Phoxinus phoxinus (known colloquially as the Eurasian minnow, minnow, Channel minnow, or common minnow) is a species of freshwater ray-finned fish belonging to the family Leuciscidae, which includes the daces, minnows and related fishes. It is the type species of genus Phoxinus. This taxon was formerly considered to be the only species in the genus Phoxinus found in Europe and to have a wide geographic range in Eurasia, however, it is now regarded as part of a species complex with new species being described across its former range and this species being restricted to Western Europe. It occurs predominantly in cool (12–20 °C (54–68 °F)) streams and well-oxygenated lakes and ponds. It is noted for being a gregarious species, shoaling in large numbers.

== Taxonomy ==
Phoxinus phoxinus was first formally described as Cyprinus phoxinus by Carl Linnaeus in the 10th edition of Systema Naturae published in 1758 with its type locality given as the River Agger north of Lohmar at 50°50'N, 7°12'E, in Nordrhein-Westfalen in Germany. In 1820 the French polymath and naturalist Constantine Samuel Rafinesque proposed the genus Phoxinus, although he placed no species there but this species is the type species by absolute tautonymy. In 2007 Maurice Kottelat published a paper on the variation in populations of what were thought to be "common minnows" Ph. phoxinus sensu lato and revealed that what had been thought to be a single widespread Palearctic species was, in fact, a species complex. This species is classified within the genus Phoxinus, the Eurasian minnows, within the monotypic subfamily Phoxininae of the family Leuciscidae.

== Description ==
Phoxinus phoxinus is a small fish which reaches a maximum total length of 14 centimetres (5 1/2 in), but is normally around 7 centimetres (3 in) in length. It has 3 spines and 6–8 soft rays in its dorsal fin with 3 spines and 6–8 soft rays in its anal fin. Its spine is made up of 38–40 vertebrae. It is distinguished from similar species which occur in Europe by having the lateral line normally extending beyond the nase of the anal fin, by a line of vertically elongated blotches along the lateral line each with a depth equivalent to 1/3–1/2 of the body's depth at same position, these blotches often fuse to form a midlateral stripe, caudal peduncle has a depth of 2.6–3.1 times its length. The scales on the breast are patchy and the patches of scales are separated by unscaled areas although they are rarely connected by 1–2 rows of scales. Its snout length is 29–34% of the head length and is 1.1–1.4 times the diameter of the eye. The anal fin has its origin in front of the base of the last dorsal ray. The caudal fin consists of 19 soft rays. The back is normally brownish-green, and is separated from the whitish-gray underside by the lateral stripe or blotches described above,

== Distribution ==
Phoxinus phoxinus is indigenous to the river catchments draining into the North Sea and English Channel, from the Rhine system south to Normandy and in Great Britain. In Scotland it is regarded as an introduced non native species, and this is probably the case in Ireland. Introductions are likely to have occurred elsewhere, including Norway and Spain, although efforts have been made to remove invasive populations. https://timesofindia.indiatimes.com/science/nature/scientists-removed-invasive-minnows-from-two-spanish-mountain-lakes-10-months-later-amphibians-and-aquatic-invertebrates-returned/amp_articleshow/134403275.cms

== Habitat ==
The common minnow is found in a wide variety of environments that have cold, well oxygenated water, often in syntopy with salmonids. These include small streams with fast currents, and, in the more northerly parts of its range, large lowland rivers. It also lives in still waters as varied as small mountain lakes to large, oligotrophic lakes. For spawning, it requires clean gravel areas in well oxygenated flowing water or where waves wash on lake shores. It also needs deep pools with low current to overwinter in, and these must have a coarse substrate among which the fish can hide.

== Behavior ==
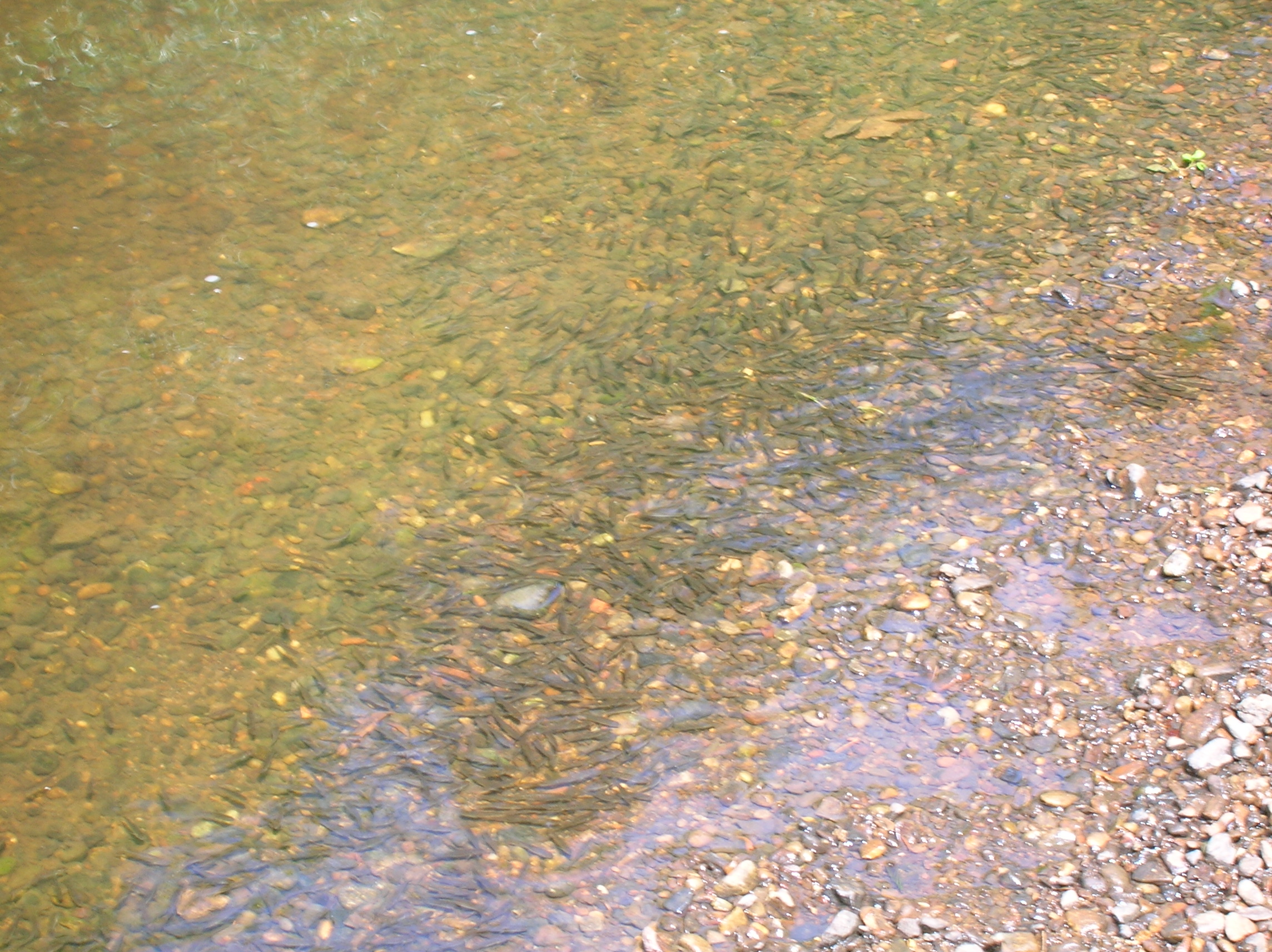
Minnows shoaling in the shallows at Eglinton Country Park in Scotland

=== Shoaling ===
Shoaling and schooling behavior of common minnows occur early in their development, as soon as they become capable of swimming. Shoaling behavior then increases and becomes dominant by three to four weeks after its emergence. This behavior generally benefits individual minnows by improving predator avoidance and foraging. However, there are also costs of living in groups such as increased competition for food and risk of infection. Shoaling behavior is modified depending on the situation such as presence of predators or resource availability.

=== Predator avoidance ===
The group formation of common minnows can be explained by the selfish herd effect proposed by W.D. Hamilton. According to the selfish herd theory, a group forms as individuals try to reduce their domain of danger by approaching others and continuously moving toward the center of the group where the risk of predation is the lowest. As the theory predicts, common minnows increase their shoaling behavior in response to increased predation pressure.

==== Alarm substance ====
Common minnows can detect the predators' presence and communicate with their shoalmates by a chemical signal that is detected by olfactory nerves. The chemical, named Schreckstoff after a German word meaning "fear substance" by Karl von Frisch who first described it, is contained in specialized skin cells called alarm substance cells and is released from an injured or killed minnow. The shoalmates can detect the chemical and respond to the increased risk of predation.

The production and release of this alarm substance are altruistic because the sender of the signal, who does not directly benefit from the signal released upon its injury, has to pay the cost for the production and release of the chemical. In fact, the alarm substance cells decrease in number when the common minnows are in poor physical condition due to scarce food, indicating that there is metabolic cost for producing and maintaining the specialized cells. The apparent altruistic behavior is not clearly understood, because the likely explanation of kin selection is not supported by the shoal structure of common minnows in which shoalmates are not necessarily closely related.

==== Shoaling adjustment in response to predation risk ====
When common minnows sense the alarm substance, they form tighter shoals as individuals move to be in the central position in their shoaling group. However, in an experiment where common minnows were habituated to the chemical by continuous exposure, common minnows did not react to the signal. Only the naïve common minnows reacted to the signal by relocating themselves to the central position in the group. In another experiment, researchers observed common minnows in semi-natural setting and found that common minnows' shoaling behavior varies depending on the habitat's complexity. Minnows tend to respond to increased predation risk by forming larger shoals in structurally simple habitats and by reducing their rate of movement in complex habitats.

==== Predator inspection ====
When potential predators come near the shoal, some common minnows take the risk of approaching the predators in order to inspect the predator and assess the danger. Predator inspection behavior increases the risk of being attacked and eaten by the predator, but the behavior is beneficial to the inspectors as more alert minnows react more quickly to the attack of the predator. Common minnows are expected to recognize predators by their appearance. In an experiment, common minnows inspected a realistic-looking model of a pike, one of the major predators of minnows, and a simple cylinder model. Common minnows showed high level of alertness, such as low feeding rate and frequent skittering after their visit to the realistic model, but they became easily habituated to the simple model and resumed foraging even in proximity to the model.

In addition to identifying predators by their appearance, common minnows can respond to the predators' motivation to attack. In an experiment, common minnows inspected a northern pike behind a clear partition at regular intervals until the pike tried to attack the minnows. Their responses differed depending on when their visit was made. Minnows that inspected the pike just before the pike attacked were more alarmed than those who inspected the pike long before the attack. The observation shows that common minnows can detect the predator's impending aggressiveness and motivation to attack.

==== Variations in anti-predator activities ====
Different populations of common minnows show varying degrees of anti-predatory activities. Common minnows from populations in high-predation areas usually show more intense predator inspection than those from low-predation areas. They tend to commence inspection sooner, form larger group of inspectors, inspect more frequently, and approach less to the predator.

Some components of anti-predator activities are inherited, as indicated in the early emergence of shoaling behavior in laboratory-raised immature minnows. The varying levels of predator inspection and shoaling behavior in response to predator's presence can arise in laboratory-raised minnows even though they do not have any experience of predators. Their anti-predatory behaviors are qualitatively and quantitatively similar to their wild-caught counterparts. Anti-predatory behaviors are modified by early experience of predators. Early exposure to predators increases the inspection rate and shoaling tendency.

=== Foraging ===
Shoaling behavior improves foraging success, because the demand for anti-predatory activities per individual is reduced and because more individuals scanning for food leads to quicker detection. In general, a larger shoal of fish locates food faster, which was confirmed to be true in common minnows.

==== Individual recognition and shoal choice ====
Common minnows do not randomly choose shoalmates to forage with. They tend to associate with familiar shoalmates and prefer to form shoals with poor competitors for food, which indicates that they can recognize individual conspecifics. It is more beneficial to shoal with poor competitors because while group foraging helps the search for food, it also leads to competition for food among the shoalmates. Common minnows tend to associate with familiar shoalmates, but new alliances can form when different groups encounter. In an experiment in which common minnows from different groups were introduced to a common environment and monitored, they associated significantly more frequently with familiar individuals than unfamiliar individuals. The preference lasted up to two weeks, but by the third week, new association patterns were observed.

== Breeding in captivity ==
The Eurasian minnow breeds well in cold fresh water aquariums, but it is rarely sold as an aquarium fish. They need a good supply of oxygen (some air bubblers do fine), a reasonable current (which is often provided by the bubblers if they are good strong ones), and a gravel bottom. It is not clear what size works best although smallish (0.5 centimetres (3/16 in) each) works well. Clean water helps and so do plant life and general good quality aquarium conditions. Breeding begins around late May when the fish become noticeably more active, and the fish begin to change colour. The females don't change their colour so much, more the shape of their body; in fact the colours seem to fade if anything except for the fins which become slightly more red. Their body becomes more deep set toward the abdomen, which area also starts bulking out. Although the changes in the female are small, the changes in the male are huge. First of all, the difference in the shades of colour on the fish become stronger (dark gets darker, light gets lighter), and the fins, throat and some other areas redden. These colour changes strengthen as the fish gets closer to breeding. The body becomes much bulkier, and the gills become very pale with iridescent light blue patches towards the bottom and below. This contrasts with the now very dark body. Later the scales on the lower half of the body begin to stand out more and become slightly gold-lined. All these strengthen as time passes on. All the fins, especially the dorsal, start to stick out more; this happens in both sexes. The males begin to chase females around, rubbing their sides against them, and this becomes very frenzied and aggressive towards the mating. Mating happens when this behaviour reaches its climax where the female releases the eggs and the male fertilizes them.

Fertilised eggs promptly sink to the bottom and into the gravel. The other fish will start eating the eggs and picking at the gravel to find them. The male will then ferociously guard them for a period of time. A few days later the eggs will hatch and the fry will emerge. It is very important to have much plant cover for the fry to hide in as the adult fish will try to eat them especially if underfed and if not much other live food is given. The baby fry feed on small organisms called infusoria and algae. To grow infusoria for feeding just get a jam jar of pond water and run it through some cotton wool or muslin to get out any larger predatory organisms like daphnia which will eat the infusoria and add hay to the water. Leave it for a few days in a dimly lit room at about room temp. There will be many tiny white dots in the water which, if looked at under a microscope reveal to be many types of infusoria in their millions. These can be fed to the fry by adding them to the tank. To get more just add some of the old water containing the infusoria to cooled, boiled tap water with hay and repeat the other procedures. As the fry grow their diet changes. When they reach about 1/2 inch (13 mm) they can be fed small organisms like daphnia or cyclops. These can be obtained by dragging a net through water where they can be seen or they can be purchased from aquarium dealers. Soon the fish will eat the same food as the adults and will quickly grow.

== Endocrinology ==
Skin color changes are controlled by photoreceptors deep in the brain. This has contributed greatly to understanding of photoactivation of various processes across vertebrates - including for example, seasonality.
