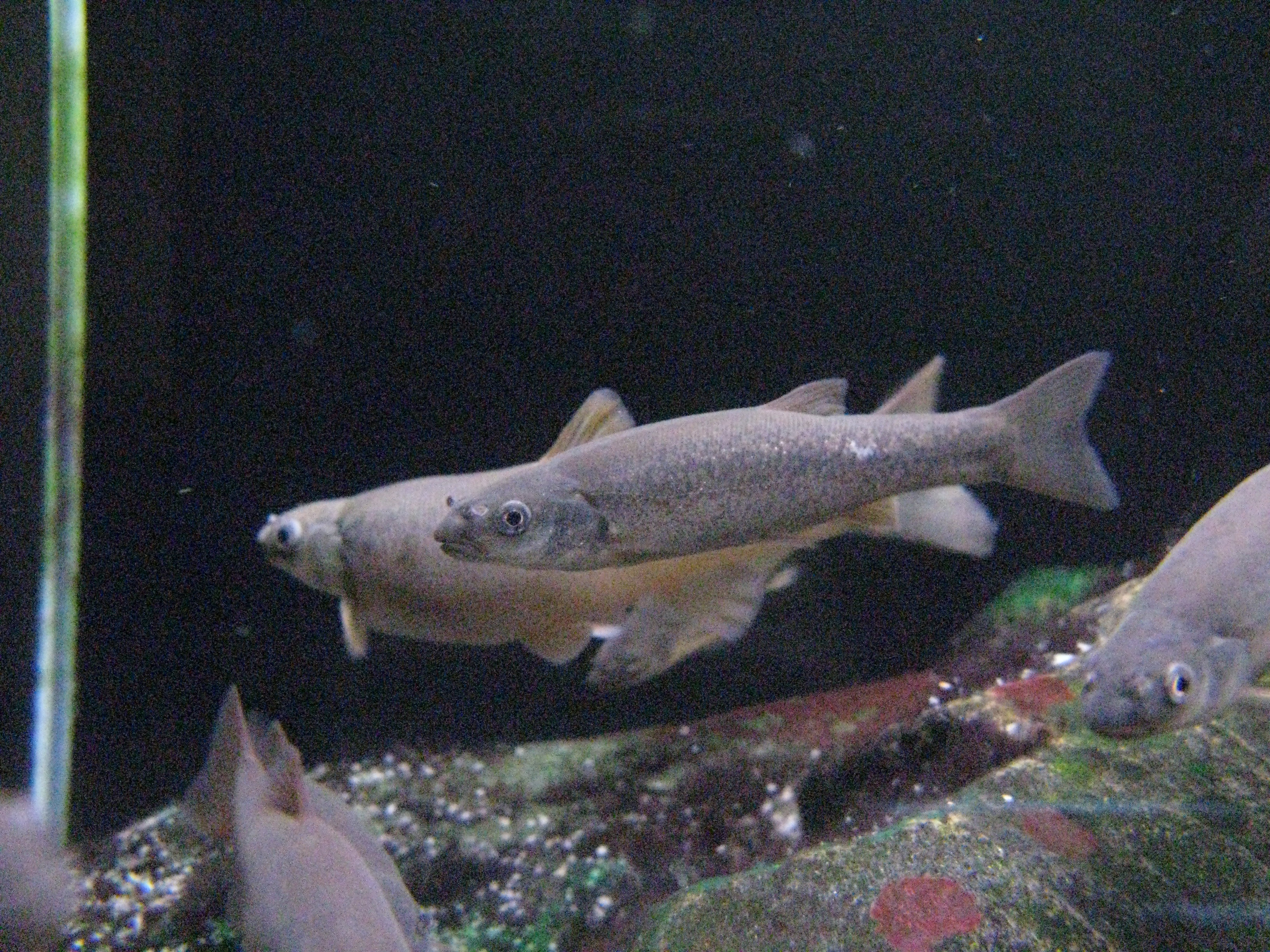
- Rhynchocypris oxycephalus

Scientific classification
- Kingdom: Animalia
- Phylum: Chordata
- Class: Actinopterygii
- Order: Cypriniformes
- Family: Leuciscidae
- Subfamily: Pseudaspininae; Bogutskaya, 1990

Genera
- See text.

= Pseudaspininae =

Subfamily of fishes

Pseudaspininae is a subfamily of freshwater ray-finned fish belonging to the family Leuciscidae, which contains the true minnows. It is also known as the Far East Asian (FEA) clade of minnows. As the name suggests, all members of this family are found in East Asia.

== Genera ==
Pseudaspininae contains the following genera:

- Oreoleuciscus Warpachowski, 1889 (osmans)
- Pseudaspius Dybowski, 1869 (redfin)
- Rhynchocypris Günther, 1889 (East Asian minnows)
