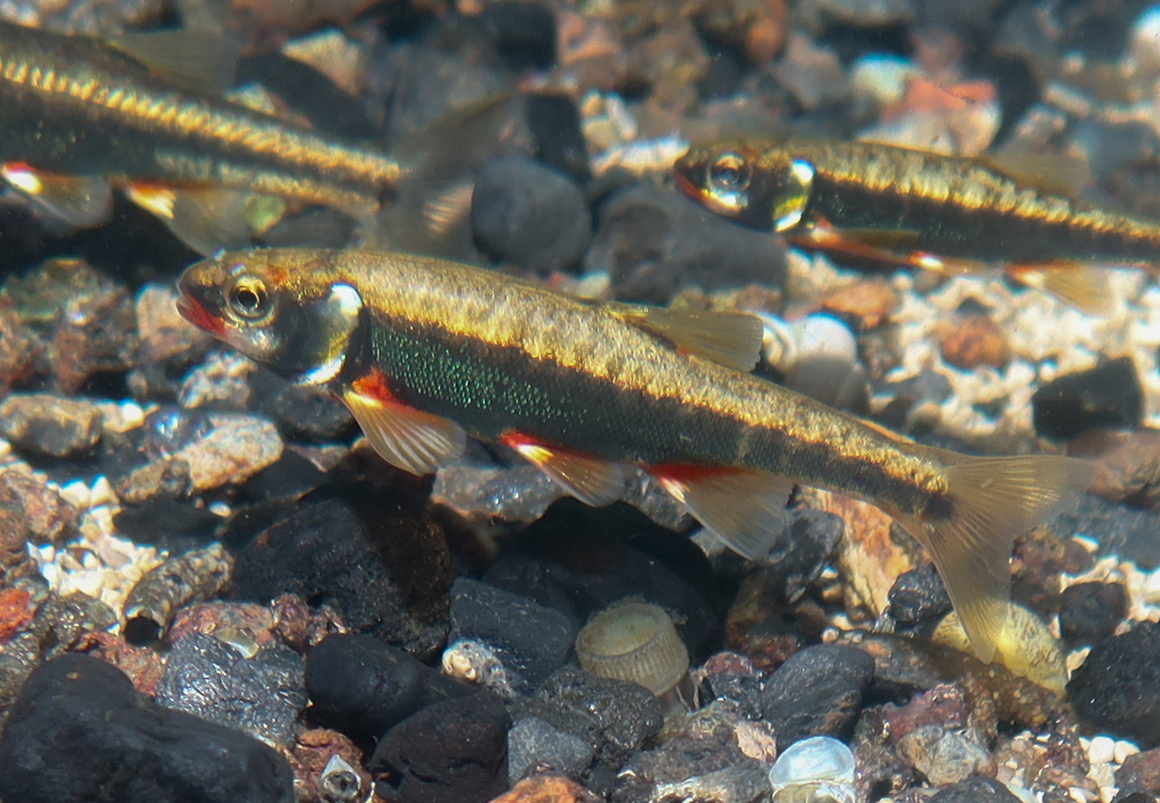
- Phoxinus septimaniae
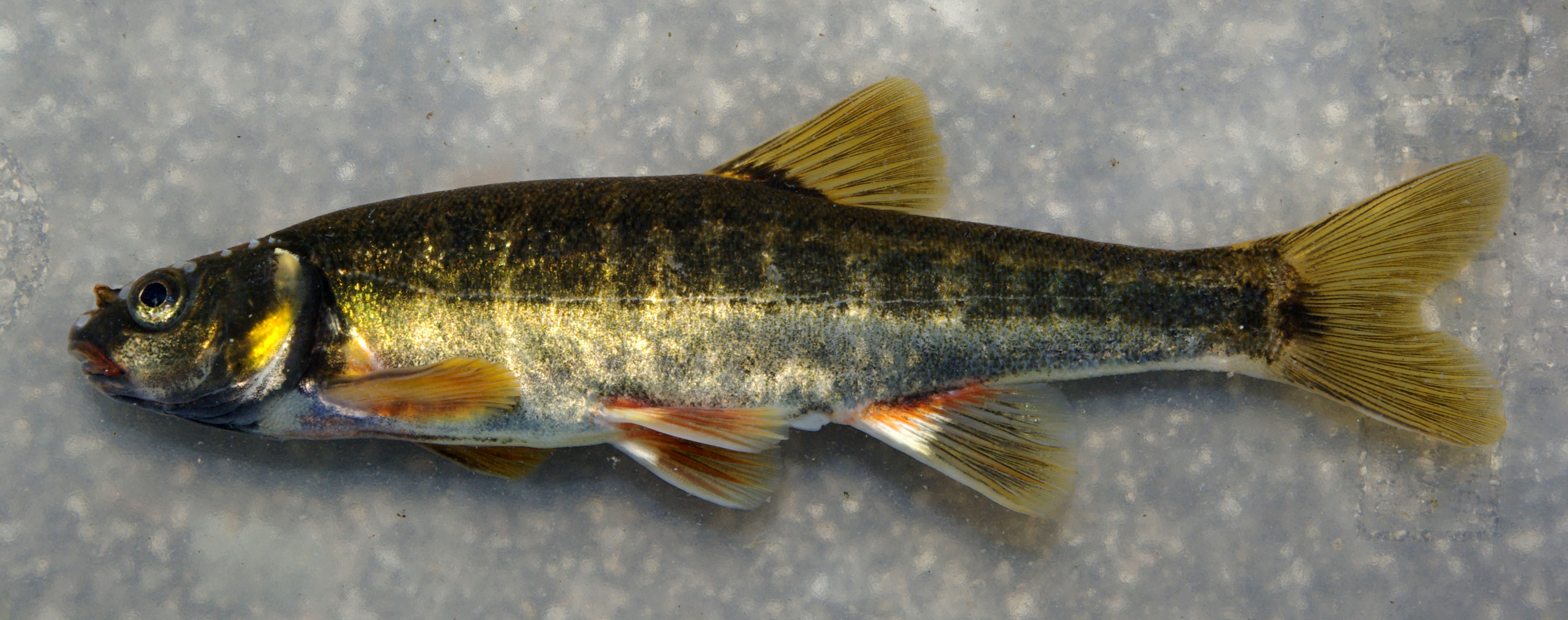
- Phoxinus bigerri

Scientific classification
- Kingdom: Animalia
- Phylum: Chordata
- Class: Actinopterygii
- Order: Cypriniformes
- Family: Leuciscidae
- Subfamily: Phoxininae; Bleeker, 1863
- Genus: Phoxinus; Rafinesque, 1820

Type species
- Cyprinus phoxinus Linnaeus, 1758

Synonyms
- Phoxinus Agassiz, 1835; Acahara Jordan & Hubbs, 1925; Eulinneela Dybowski, 1916

= Phoxinus =

Phoxinus Temporal range: Early Oligocene–present

Genus of fishes

Phoxinus is a genus of freshwater fish in the family Leuciscidae of order Cypriniformes, and the only members of the subfamily Phoxininae, or Eurasian minnows. The other species in this genus are also commonly known as minnows. The name "minnow" was what early English fisherman used to describe "small and insignificant". The genus Phoxinus is found throughout Eurasia, and includes 21 known species. Previously, members of the North American genus Chrosomus were also believed to form part of this genus.

== Species ==
Phoxinus contains the following species:

- Phoxinus abanticus Turan, Bayçelebi, Özuluğ, Gaygusuz & Aksu, 2023
- Phoxinus adagumicus Artaev, Turbanov, Bolotovskiy, Gandlin & Levin, 2024
- Phoxinus bigerri Kottelat, 2007 (Pyrenean minnow)
- Phoxinus brachyurus Berg, 1912 (Seven Rivers minnow)
- Phoxinus chrysoprasius (Pallas, 1814)
- Phoxinus colchicus Berg, 1910.
- Phoxinus csikii Hankó, 1922 (Danube minnow)
- Phoxinus dragarum Denys, Dettaï, Persat, Daszkiewicz, Hautecoeur & Keith, 2020 (Garonne minnow)
- Phoxinus fayollarum Denys, Dettaï, Persat, Daszkiewicz, Hautecoeur & Keith, 2020 (Loire minnow)
- Phoxinus grumi Berg, 1907
- Phoxinus isetensis (Georgi, 1775)
- Phoxinus issykkulensis Berg, 1912 (Issyk-kul' minnow)
- Phoxinus karsticus Bianco & De Bonis, 2015 (Karst minnow)
- Phoxinus krkae Bogutskaya, Jelić, Vucić, Jelić, Diripasko, Stefanov & Klobučar, 2019 (Krka minnow)
- Phoxinus lumaireul (Schinz 1840) (Balkan Italic minnow)
- Phoxinus marsilii Heckel, 1836 (Baltic minnow)
- Phoxinus oxyrhynchus (Mori 1930)
- Phoxinus phoxinus (Linnaeus, 1758) (Eurasian or common minnow)
- Phoxinus poljakowii Kessler, 1879 (Balkhash minnow)
- Phoxinus radeki Bayçelebi, Aksu & Turan, 2024
- Phoxinus septimaniae Kottelat, 2007 (Languedoc minnow)
- Phoxinus strandjae Drensky, 1926 (Bulgarian minnow)
- Phoxinus strymonicus Kottelat, 2007 (Aegean minnow)
- Phoxinus tchangi X. Y. Chen, 1988
- Phoxinus tumensis Luo, 1996
- Phoxinus ujmonensis Kaschenko, 1899

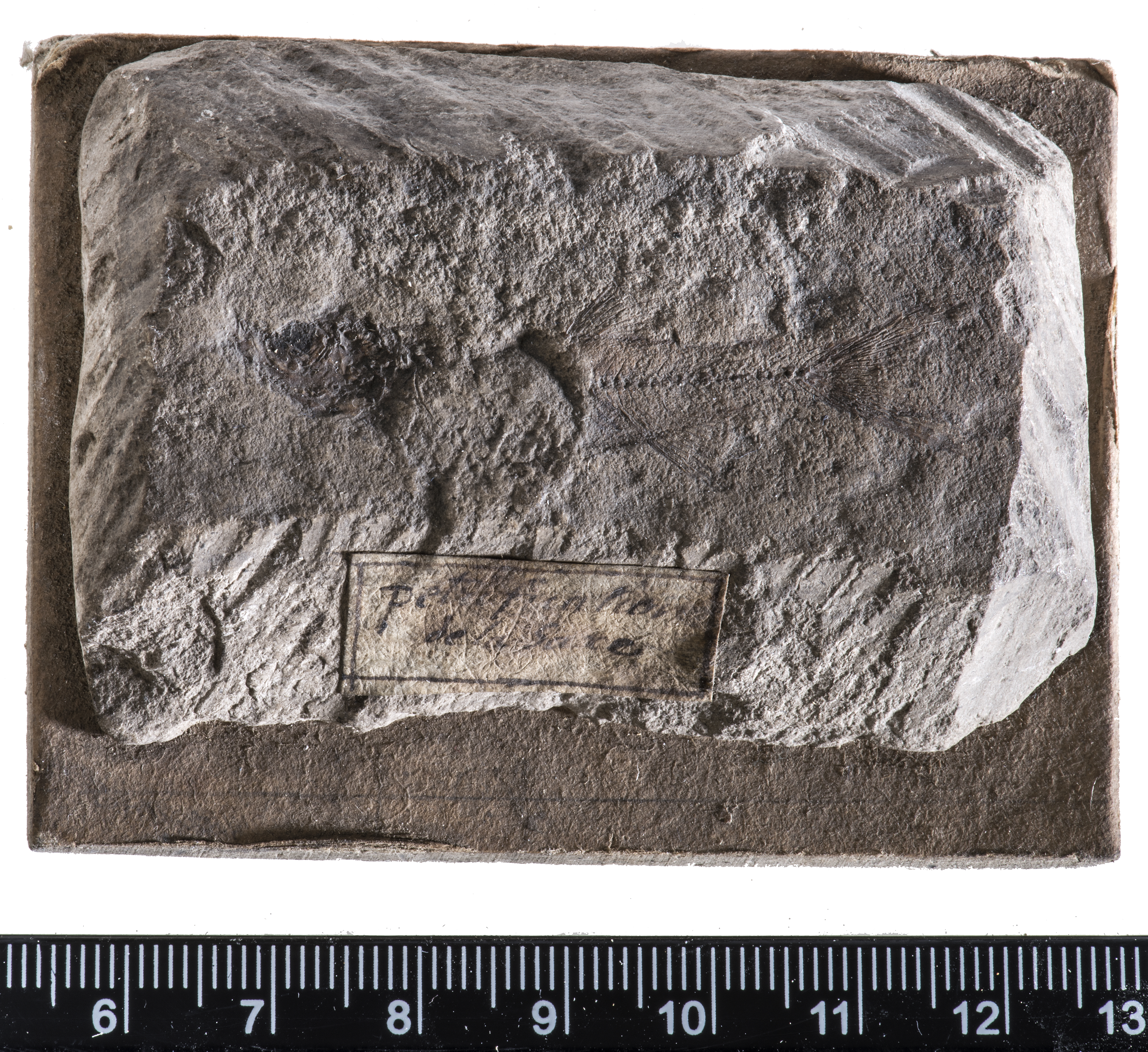
Fossil skeleton of Palaeorutilus

A single fossil phoxinine is known, the genus †Palaeorutilus Gaudant, 1988 from the early to late Oligocene of Europe.
