= Hesperoleucus mitrulus =

Conservation status
- Critically Imperiled (NatureServe)

Scientific classification
- Kingdom: Animalia
- Phylum: Chordata
- Class: Actinopterygii
- Order: Cypriniformes
- Family: Leuciscidae
- Genus: Hesperoleucus
- Species: H. mitrulus

Binomial name
- Hesperoleucus mitrulus Snyder, 1913

Species of fish

Hesperoleucus mitrulus, the northern roach or pit roach, is a species of freshwater ray-finned fish belonging to the family Leuciscidae, which includes the daces, chubs, Eurasian minnows and related species. This species is found in the Western United States in California and Oregon.

== Taxonomy ==
Hesperoleucus mitrulus was first formally described in 1913 by the American ichthyologist John Otterbein Snyder with its type locality given as Drew Creek, Drews Valley in Lake County, Oregon. This taxon was previously considered to be a synonym of the California roach (H. symmetricus) but in 2019 it was shown to be a valid species. Thie genus Hesperoleucus is classified within the subfamily Laviniinae, the Western chubs, within the family Leuciscidae.

== Etymology ==
Hesperoleucus mitrulus is classified within the genus Hesperoleucus, this name combines the Latin word Hesperus, which means "western", and leucos, which is thought to be a shortening of Myloleucus, a synonym of Gila. This name reflects that the species in this genus are found in Western North America and their similarity to Gila. The specific name is an unnecessary masculization of mitrula, which means "turban". Snyder did not explain why this epithet was chosen but it may be an allusion to the convex shape of the scales, which could be said to resemble a turban.

== Description ==
Hesperoleucus mitrulus are small fishes in which the adults have a typical total length of 5 to 10 cm (2.0 to 3.9 in). Like the California roach, the Pit roach has a bronzy body color and has a robust body with a deep caudal peduncle and a rounded snout. It can be told apart from the California roach by its short rounded fins and the convex scales. They have 7 dorsal fin rays and 8 anal fin rays and the pectoral fins of the males are relatively longer than those of the females.

== Distribution and habitat ==
Hesperoleucus mitrulus is endemic to northern California and southern Oregon. In Oregon it is found in a number of Creeks draining into Goose Lake (Oregon–California) in Lake County. In California it is found in tributaries of the Pit River in Shasta, Lassen and Modoc counties. Here it was found in only 21 out of 261 tributaries sampled. These fishes are found in deep muddy or rocky pools in permanent tributary streams with slow flows, moderate gradient and mats of floating vegetation.

== Conservation status ==
Hesperoleucus mitrulus is classified as Critically Imperiled by NatureServe and them main cause of its decline is given as habitat degradation through agriculture and overgrazing, other threats include logging, invasive non native fish and climate change, which may cause drought within its range.
