= Gualala roach =

Conservation status
- Critically Imperiled (NatureServe)

Scientific classification
- Kingdom: Animalia
- Phylum: Chordata
- Class: Actinopterygii
- Order: Cypriniformes
- Family: Leuciscidae
- Genus: Hesperoleucus
- Species: H. parvipinnis

Binomial name
- Hesperoleucus parvipinnis Snyder, 1913

Species of fish

The Gualala roach (Hesperoleucus parvipinnis) is a species of freshwater ray-finned fish belonging to the family Leuciscidae, which includes the daces, chubs, Eurasian minnows and related species. This species is endemic to California.

== Taxonomy ==
The Gualala roach was first formally described in 1913 by the American ichthyologist John Otterbein Snyder with its type locality given as the Wheatfield Fork of Gualala River in Sonoma County, California. This taxon was previously considered to be a synonym of the California roach (H. symmetricus) but in 2019 it was shown to be a valid species. Thie genus Hesperoleucus is classified within the subfamily Laviniinae, the Western chubs, within the family Leuciscidae.

== Etymology ==
The Gualala roach is classified within the genus Hesperoleucus, this name combines the Latin word Hesperus, which means "western", and leucos, which is thought to be a shortening of Myloleucus, a synonym of Gila. This name reflects that the species in this genus are found in Western North America and their similarity to Gila. The specific name prefixes pinna, which mean "fin", with parvi, meaning "small", a reference to the small, rounded fins.

== Description ==
The Gualala roach is a small fish, with adults typically measuring 5 to 8 cm (2.0 to 3.1 in) in length. They have a bronzy color similar to that of the California roach (H. symmetricus). This species can be distinguished from other members of the genus Hesperoleucus by its smaller scales, with between 54 and 65 scales along its lateral line, a shorter snout, shorter rounded fins and a thicker body. The dorsal fin contains 7-8 rays, averaging 8, while the anal fin has 6-8 rays, averaging 6. Along the flanks, above the lateral line, there is a pale stripe about 2 scales wide. Below this stripe lies a thinner, darker stripe, accompanied by several thinner dark stripes which fade toward the belly.

== Distribution ==
The Gualala roach is endemic to the Gualala River system in Sonoma County, California. It is most numerous in the warmer waters of the Southern and Wheatfield Forks and their tributaries but it is less common in the cooler Northern Fork, and in the mainstrean below its confluence with the Northern Fork.
