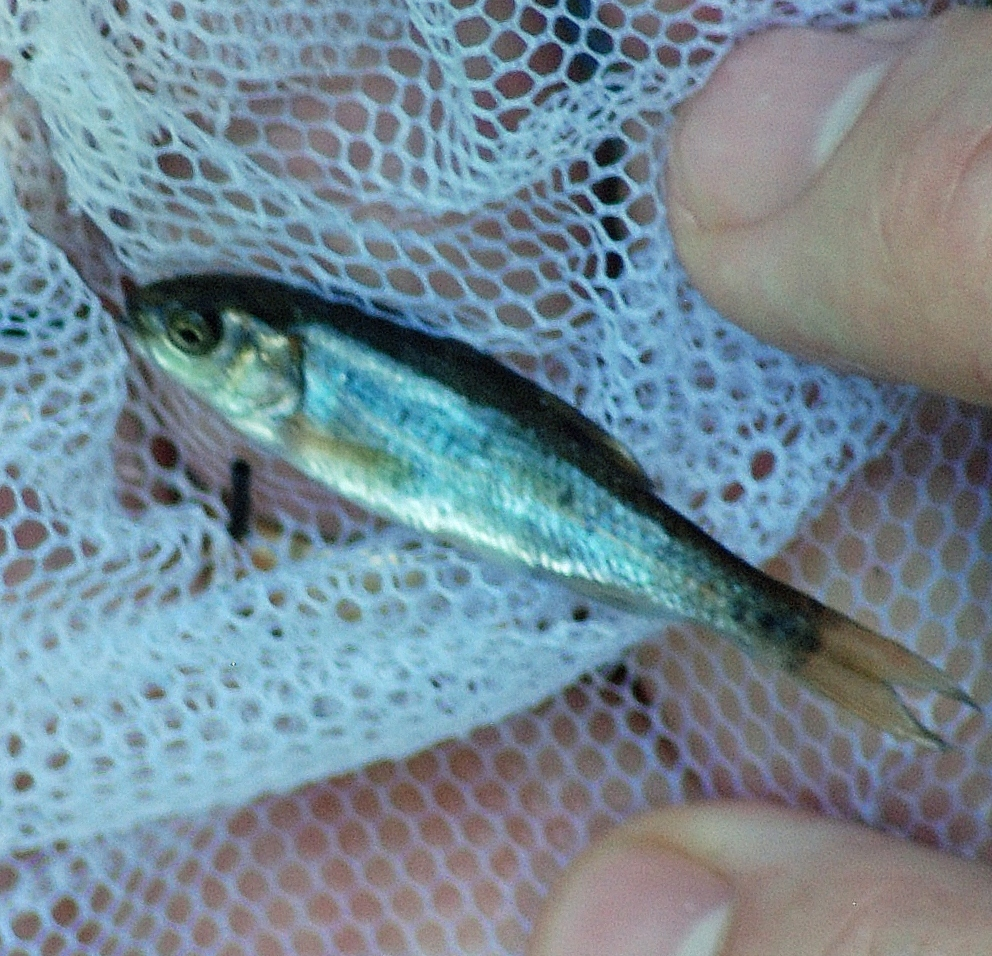

Conservation status
- Least Concern (IUCN 3.1)

Scientific classification
- Kingdom: Animalia
- Phylum: Chordata
- Class: Actinopterygii
- Division: Teleostei
- Order: Cypriniformes
- Family: Leuciscidae
- Subfamily: Laviniinae
- Genus: Hesperoleucus; Snyder, 1913
- Species: H. symmetricus

Binomial name
- Hesperoleucus symmetricus (S. F. Baird & Girard, 1854)

Synonyms
- Pogonichthys symmetricus Baird & Girard, 1854; Lavinia symmetricus (Baird & Girard, 1854); Hesperoleucus navarroensis Snyder, 1913

= California roach =

Species of fish

The California roach (Hesperoleucus symmetricus, previously Lavinia symmetricus) is a species of freshwater ray-finned fish belonging to the family Leuciscidae, which includes the daces, chubs, Eurasian minnows and related species. This species is native to western North America and abundant in the intermittent streams throughout central California. Once considered a single species, it has recently been split into a number of closely related species and subspecies. It is closely related to the hitch, and together they form a species complex. The California roach derives its common name from its visual similarities to the roach of Europe; however, they are not closely taxonomically related.

== Taxonomic subdivision and history ==
The California roach boasts a complicated history of taxonomic classification and reclassification. It was first described in 1854 as Pogonichthys symmetricus. Later, in 1896 Jordan and Everman grouped the California roach with the superficially similar European roach. In 1913 the California roach was reclassified and the genus Hesperoleucus was created splitting the species into 5 different species based on locality. This split was disputed in later studies in 1945 and 1948 which argued the differences between California roach populations only justified classification as subspecies, and the subspecies were reorganized. A 2019 study on the genomics of samples from the California roach/hitch species complex was able to identify each evolutionary lineage from the genus to population level and led to the reclassification of the California roach into four species and four subspecies.

- Hesperoleucus parvipinnis — Gualala roach
- Hesperoleucus mitrulus — northern roach
- Hesperoleucus venustus — coastal roach
  - H. v. navarroensis — northern coastal roach
  - H. v. subditus — southern coastal roach
- Hesperoleucus symmetricus — California roach
  - H. s. symmetricus — California roach
  - H. s. serpentinus — Red Hills roach

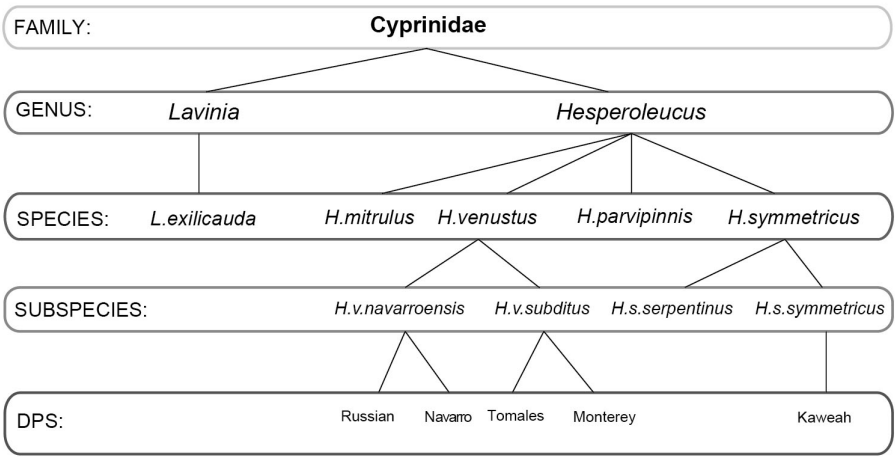
CA roach Hitch species complex

A complete taxonomic breakdown of the California roach/hitch species complex

== Description and physical traits ==
These fishes have a small, stout body shape with a large conical head and large eyes, but a small slightly subterminal or inferior mouth. Some individuals exhibit a "chisel lip", which is a cartilaginous plate on the lower jaw. Most adults do not reach 100 mm (3.9 in) in total length but some have been observed as long as 150 mm (5.9 in). Additionally, their caudal tails are characteristically deeply forked and connect to the body with narrow peduncles. They sport a darkly colored upper half of their bodies with shades ranging from dark gray to steely blue, and a dull silver or white underside. Their scales are small and can range from 47 to 62 total scales along the lateral line. They have short dorsal and anal fins with 8–10 and 7–9 rays respectively. The dorsal fin is positioned behind the pelvic fins. Some individuals are occasionally observed with more fin rays, however these are most often hybrids with Hitch or Chub species. The different species and subspecies of the California roach species complex can be easily confused for each other. The prevalence of certain features, such as the chisel lip, are more common or pronounced in some species over others, but are difficult to differentiate with certainty. Ultimately the most accurate way to differentiate these species is genetically, or with the knowledge of which watershed they are from. During the breeding season, red-orange patches appear on the chin, operculum, and at the bases of pectoral, pelvic, and anal fins.

The steeply forked tail, narrow peduncle, large conical head, slightly subterminal mouth, and placement of the dorsal fin behind the pelvic fins shown in this image are the most characteristic universal features of the California roach. Additionally this individual exhibits the orange patches on its chin, operculum, and base of its pectoral, pelvic, and anal fins that indicate this sample was photographed during its breeding season.

The steeply forked tail, narrow peduncle, large conical head, slightly subterminal mouth, and placement of the dorsal fin behind the pelvic fins shown in this image are the most characteristic universal features of the California roach. Additionally this individual exhibits the orange patches on its chin, operculum, and base of its pectoral, pelvic, and anal fins that indicate this sample was photographed during its breeding season.

== Diet ==
California roaches are omnivores and mainly bottom feeders. Filamentous algae are the main part of their diet, followed by aquatic insects and crustaceans which make up 25–30% of their diet. Crustaceans and chironomid (non-biting) midge larvae are especially important aspects of the diet of smaller roach. Larger individuals eat insects roughly in proportion to their abundance. Because California roach primarily feed from the silty bottoms of streams their stomachs fill with detritus and debris. Some lab experiments suggest this detritus is retained by mucus secreted from epithelial cells and gill rakers suggesting it may have nutritional value. They are eaten by other fish, in particular green sunfish and pikeminnows being among their most common predators.

== Life history ==
Roach typically reach sexual maturity after 2 to 3 years once they have grown to about 45–60 mm in length. Spawning occurs mainly from March through June but can vary depending on water temperature, which typically needs to exceed 16 °C. They move into shallow, flowing water, over bottoms covered with small rocks 3–5 cm in diameter, and form up into schools. Females lay a few eggs at a time, eventually putting down from 250 to 2000 eggs each. The adhesive eggs are laid in crevices, where they stick to the rocks, and then the males fertilize them. The fry continues to dwell in the crevices until they are strong enough to swim actively.

== Biology and adaptations ==
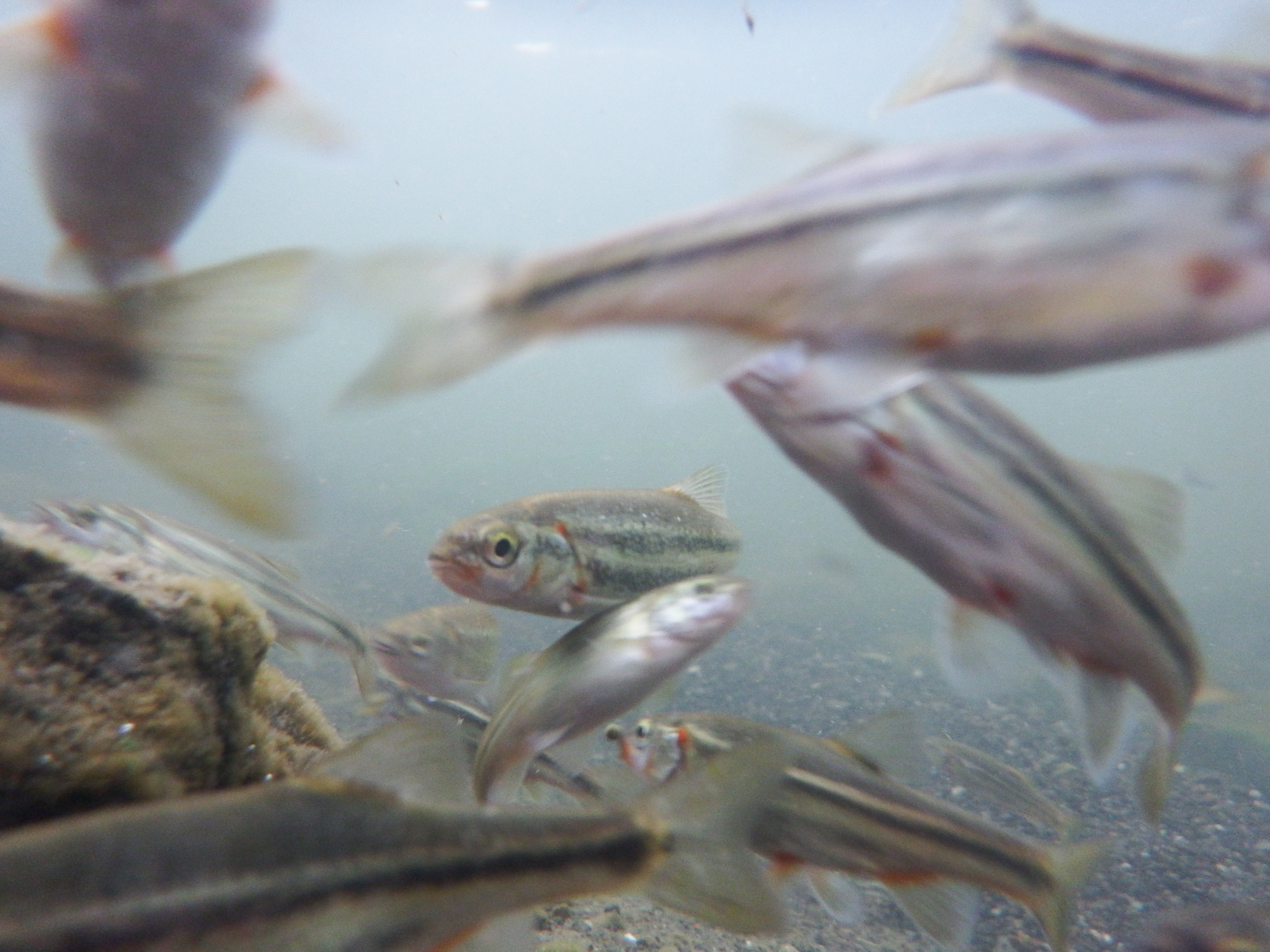
California roaches in their native habitat in Bear Creek within the Berryessa-Snow Mountain National Monument.

The California roach are resilient fishes that take advantage of the intermittent waters of central California under conditions most other fishes cannot survive. Roach can tolerate temperatures as high as 30–35 °C and oxygen levels as low as 1-2 ppm. Their resilience allows them to inhabit intermittent streams even as the spring streams dry up. Even in the remaining high temperature, anoxic pools, California roach can thrive in relative abundance. California roach also express greater resilience to heavily human altered habitats than most other fishes. One limitation to their resilience and habitat range is salinity. They have been observed in the Navarro River when salinity was as low as 3 ppm, but died before salinity rose above 9-10 ppm.

== Habitat and distribution ==
California roach can be found in a wide variety of habitats from small, warm, intermittent streams to more robust cold "trout" streams. They inhabit rivers and streams of varying flow and depth, but tend to be found in greater abundance in low-moderate flow and shallow depths. Additionally, the presence of predators, especially invasive ones, relegate them to the edges and ripples of pools or exclude them entirely. The historical distribution of the species complex comprises most of the Sacramento River/San Joaquin River tributaries, including Pit River and Goose Lake, and many of the small coastal streams (Russian River, Pajaro River, Salinas River, Adobe Creek, Permanente Creek, etc.) and backwater riparian regions of the major rivers below 1000 m in elevation. This elevation limit is likely due to natural barriers and high gradients. The modern distribution of the California roach excludes many streams they were historically found in due to invasive species and habitat changes. In recent times studies found them absent from the Fresno River, other tributaries to the San Joaquin, and the San Joaquin River itself. The construction of dams could be one cause of their absence in certain cases such as in the Friant River where they were documented until the construction of the Friant Dam in the 1940s. Invasive species are responsible for further absences in their historical range, such as the Redeye Bass which have caused California roach presence to disappear in the Consumnes River. Other habitat alterations have further decreased their abundance and range such as the 19th century hydraulic mining in the upper Yuba River in which California roach are almost completely absent. California roach have also had their distribution expanded beyond natural barriers to places such as Hetch-Hetchy Reservoir, which is 1,162 m (3,812 ft) in elevation and filled with predators, presumably through introduction by anglers as bait.

== Conservation status and threats ==
California roach was assessed and listed in 2012 as Least concern on the IUCN Red List. More recent studies suggest reclassifying California roach as a Species of Special Concern and to change the IUCN Red List listing as Near threatened. California roach are threatened by invasive species and anthropogenic causes of habitat change, such as mining and dam construction, as mentioned in the distribution section. Additionally, the entire taxon is considered highly vulnerable to extinction within the next century from massive changes to smaller stream habitats due to climate change. If considered as one taxonomic species, the chances of California roach's immediate extinction would be relatively low due to their wide and varied habitat range. However, with the singular taxon being divided into 4 distinct lineages these species are a major conservation concern. Now the decimation of an isolated population of California roach no longer simply means a decrease in their distribution and population, but in many cases would mean the extinction of one of these 4 lineages or subspecies.
