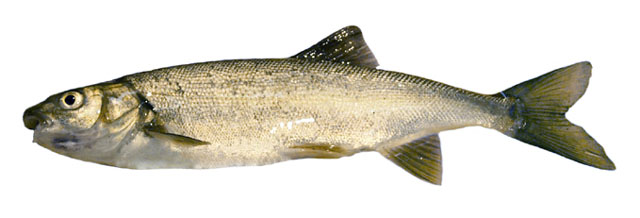

Conservation status
- Least Concern (IUCN 3.1)

- Secure (NatureServe)

Scientific classification
- Kingdom: Animalia
- Phylum: Chordata
- Class: Actinopterygii
- Order: Cypriniformes
- Family: Leuciscidae
- Subfamily: Laviniinae
- Genus: Gila
- Species: G. alutacea

Binomial name
- Gila alutacea (Agassiz & Pickering, 1855)

Synonyms
- Acrocheilus alutaceus Agassiz & Pickering, 1855; Lavinia alutacea (Agassiz & Pickering, 1855)

= Chiselmouth =

Chiselmouth Temporal range: Late Miocene/Early Pliocene-recent

Species of fish

The chiselmouth (Gila alutacea) is a species of freshwater ray-finned fishes belonging to the family Leuciscidae. This fish is found in western North America. It is named for the sharp hard plate on its lower jaw, which is used to scrape rocks for algae.

== Taxonomy ==
The chiselmouth was first formally described as Acrocheilus alutaceus in 1855 by Louis Agassiz and Charles Pickering with its type locality given as Willamette Falls, Oregon City, Clackamas County, Oregon and Wallawalla River at Whitman, then part of Walla Walla County. Agassiz and Pickering classified this species in the genus Acrocheilus, of which it was considered the only extant species. In addition to A. alutaceus, an extinct species, Acrocheilus latus (Cope, 1870) is known from the Late Miocene and Early Pliocene-aged Glenns Ferry & Ringold Formation of Idaho and Washington. Acrocheilus is now considered to be a synonym of Gila, within the subfamily Laviniinae of the family Leuciscidae.

== Description ==
The chiselmouth's body plan generally follows the standard cyprinid form, generally elongated and slightly compressed. The snout is very blunt, with the lower jaw's plate (which consists of cornified epithelium) jutting out slightly. Coloration is rather drab, dark brown above and lighter lower down. Many individuals also have a pattern of black dots, and younger fish may have a dark area at the base of the tail. The single dorsal fin has 10 soft rays, while the anal fin and well-developed pelvic fins each have 9–10 rays. Chiselmouths can reach a length of 30 cm (12 in).

== Distribution and habitat ==
Chiselmouths are typically found in warmer parts of streams and rivers in the drainages of the Columbia River, Fraser River, and the Harney-Malheur system of the Great Basin. Some are found in lakes, migrating into streams to spawn. Although abundant in many parts of their range, behavior remains little-known. Chiselmouth were among the fishes typically utilized by the Nez Perce people as food.

== Diet ==
Young fish feed on surface insects. When the chisel develops (at around 0.6 inches length), they shift to scraping, making short darting movements at the substrate to dislodge whatever is on it, and sucking it in. Although they consume filamentous algae, it seems to not be digested much despite a long coiled intestine, and their primary food actually consists of diatoms.
