= Blue chub =

Conservation status
- Least Concern (IUCN 3.1)

- Vulnerable (NatureServe)

Scientific classification
- Kingdom: Animalia
- Phylum: Chordata
- Class: Actinopterygii
- Order: Cypriniformes
- Family: Leuciscidae
- Genus: Gila
- Species: G. coerulea

Binomial name
- Gila coerulea (Girard, 1856)

Synonyms
- Cheonda coerulea Girard, 1856; Klamathella coerulea (Girard 1856); Tigoma bicolor Girard, 1856

Species of fish

The blue chub (Gila coerulea) is a species of freshwater ray-finned fish belonging to the family Leuciscidae, which includes the daces, chubs, Eurasian minnows and related species. This fish is found in the western United States.

== Taxonomy ==
The blue chub was first formally described as Cheonda coerulea in 1859 by the French biologist Charles Frédéric Girard with its type locality given as the Lost River in California. It is now classified within the genus Gila which is classified in the subfamily Laviniinae of the family Leuciscidae.

== Etymology ==
The blue chub is classified in the genus Gila, a genus proposed in 1853 by Spencer Fullerton Baird and Charles Frédéric Girard. Baird and Girard did not explain what the name alluded to, it may be to the Gila River, although Baird and Girard said the first three species they classified in this genus were found in the neighbouring Zuni River, which they may have thought were both part of the same drainage. Alternatively, they chose the name to give the genus a southwestern United States flavor. The specific name, coerulea is an alternative spelling of caerulea, which means "dark blue". Girard described this species as having a grayish blue back.

== Description ==
The blue chub has its dorsal fin supported by 9 soft rays while the anal fin contains 8 or 9 soft rays. It has a large eye, a pointed snout with a terminal mouth which extends as far as the front of the eye. It has a rather slender, laterally compressed body with a slender caudal peduncle. They have silvery sides with a dark back. The males develop a blue snout, orange fins and orange flanks in the breeding season. They rarely exceed 38 cm (15 in) in length, with a maximum total length of 41 cm (16 in).

== Distribution and habitat ==
The blue chub is endemic to the Western United States where it is found in the Lost River and the Klamath River in California and Oregon. It has colonised reservoirs downstream of Klamath Falls where it was not thought to be present in the past. It has also been introduced to other river catchments in Oregon. This species prefers rocky habitats in pools of small streams to large rivers and along the rocky shores of reservoirs and lakes.

== Biology ==
The blue chub feeds on the aquatic larvae of insects, water fleas, and filamentous algae. They can tolerate low levels of dissolved oxygen and water temperatures as high as 32 °C (90 °F). They spawn in Upper Klamath Lake in may and June when the water temperature reaches 15 to 18 °C (59 to 64 °F), laying eggs along shorelines of rock, gravel or rubble. each spawing female will be attended by a small number of males. This species can live to 17 years old.

== Conservation ==
The blue chub is classed as Least-concern by the International Union for Conservation of Nature although they state that water abstraction and introduced non native invasive species, especially the fathead minnow (Pimephales promelas).
