= Mexican roundtail chub =

Conservation status
- Least Concern (IUCN 3.1)

Scientific classification
- Kingdom: Animalia
- Phylum: Chordata
- Class: Actinopterygii
- Order: Cypriniformes
- Family: Leuciscidae
- Genus: Gila
- Species: G. minacae

Binomial name
- Gila minacae Meek, 1902

Species of fish

The Mexican roundtail chub (Gila minacae) is a species of freshwater ray-finned fish belonging to the family Leuciscidae, which includes the daces, chubs, Eurasian minnows and related species. This fish is endemic to Mexico.

Gilas are very closely related, and scientist have had trouble characterizing them and have revised the western clade. Gila are known as western chub and are an old group. There are at least 19 described species and are confined to small portions of freshwater rivers.

== Taxonomy ==
The Mexican roundtail chub was first formally described in 1902 by the American ichthyologist Seth Eugene Meek with its type locality given as the Río Paphigochic at Miñaca in the Río Yaqui basin in Chihuahua, Mexico. This species is classified within the genus Gila which is part of the western chub subfamily Laviniinae of the family Leuciscidae.

== Description ==
Characterized by its deep, compressed body, and featuring a prominent humped back that taper towards the caudal fin. This species can also be characterized by its round tail and is known for its ecological significance within freshwater ecosystems. Its head is notably flat and slightly concave, which complements their slender caudal peduncle. The species exhibits a dark olive-grey coloration on the dorsal side, that transitions to a silver hue. Gila rely on cryptic coloration for camouflage to avoid predation but are known to be prey to many non-native introduced species. The maximum length for this fish is around 43 cm (17 in).

== Distribution and habitat ==
This species is widely distributed across river basins such as the Yaqui and the San Lorenzo River and are primarily found to inhabit freshwater environments. This chub's preferred habitats include benthic or tropical settings, with the presence of warmer streams and larger river channels. These channels allow for them to find refuge within the boulders of the river.

== Reproduction and lifestyle ==
The Mexican round tail chub has sexual spawning migrations that allow for external fertilization. Their reproductive behavior occurs annually during the spring, with females that deposit eggs over gravel substrates at around 25 meters. They bury their eggs to serve as protection against predation and contribute to reproductive success.

Such fish will consume crayfish, smaller fish, frogs, and aquatic invertebrates for sustenance. These fish are commonly found on the third trophic level as they can be considered to be secondary consumers that feed on other organisms.

== Conservation status and human interactions ==
Despite facing threats such as water pollution or predation from non-native species like (channel catfish, flathead catfish, smallmouth bass, brown trout, and rainbow trout) chub is currently categorized as least concern since March 2nd, 2018. Although human activities like recreational angling pose challenges regarding the conservation status. There are efforts in place to address the threats and protect natural habitats that are essential to ensure long-term species survival.
