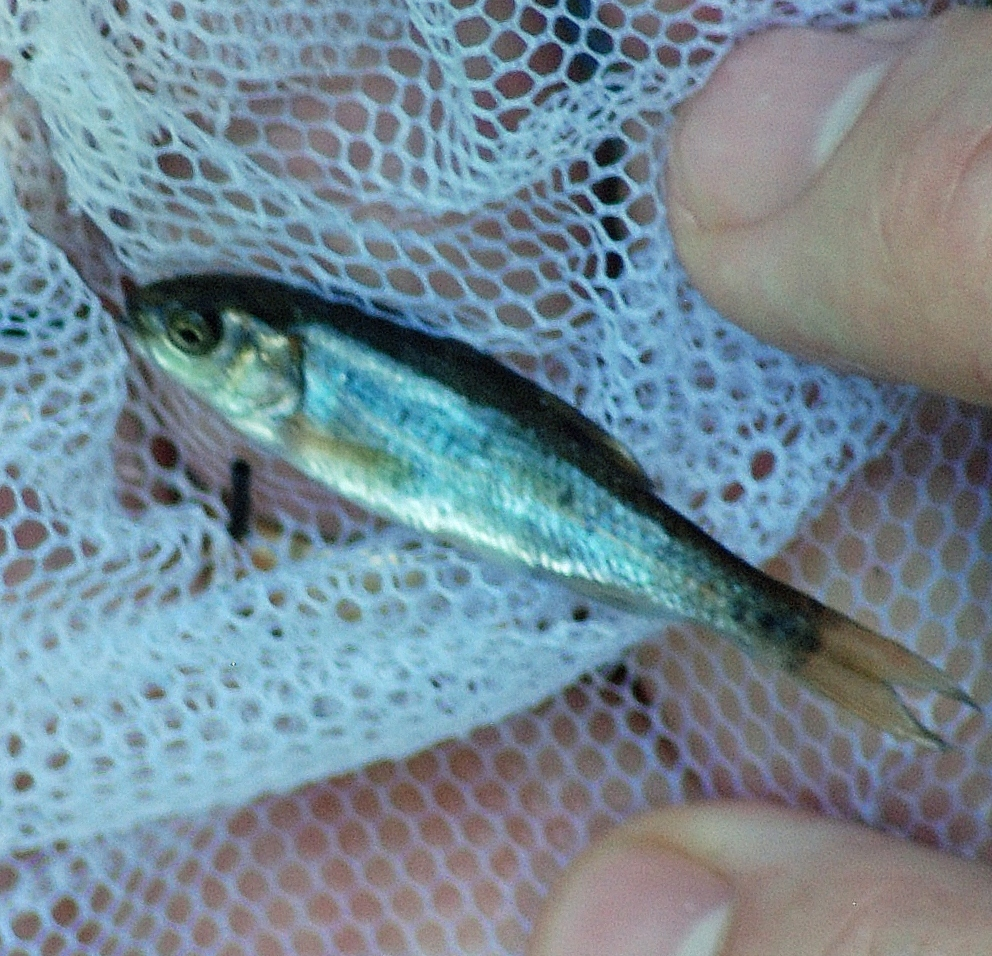
- California roach (Hesperoleucus symmetricus)

Scientific classification
- Kingdom: Animalia
- Phylum: Chordata
- Class: Actinopterygii
- Order: Cypriniformes
- Family: Leuciscidae
- Subfamily: Laviniinae
- Genus: Hesperoleucus; Snyder, 1913

Type species
- Pogonichthys symmetricus Baird & Girard, 1854

Synonyms
- Endemichthys Hopkirk, 1974

= Hesperoleucus =

Genus of fishes

Hesperoleucus is a genus of freshwater ray-finned fish belonging to the family Leuciscidae, which includes the daces, chubs, Eurasian minnows and related species. The species in this genus are found in Western North America.

== Species ==
Hesperoleucus contains the following valid species:

- Hesperoleucus mitrulus Snyder, 1913 (pit roach)
- Hesperoleucus parvipinnis Snyder, 1913 (Gualala roach)
- Hesperoleucus symmetricus (Baird & Girard, 1854) (California roach)
- Hesperoleucus venustus Snyder, 1913 (coastal roach)
