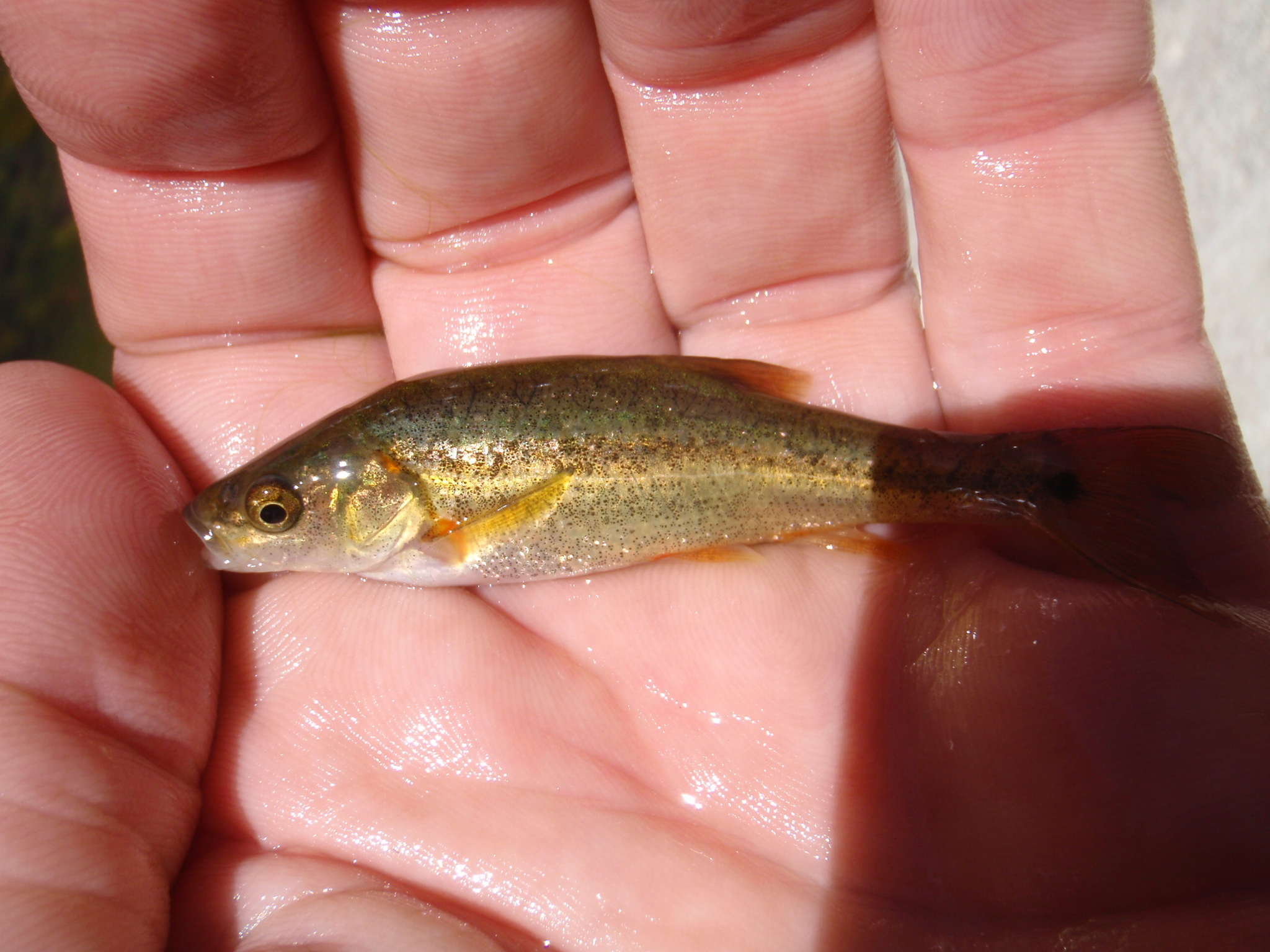

Conservation status
- Vulnerable (IUCN 3.1)

Scientific classification
- Kingdom: Animalia
- Phylum: Chordata
- Class: Actinopterygii
- Order: Cypriniformes
- Family: Leuciscidae
- Genus: Gila
- Species: G. ditaenia

Binomial name
- Gila ditaenia R. R. Miller, 1945

= Sonora chub =

Species of fish

The Sonora chub (Gila ditaenia) is a species of freshwater ray-finned fish belonging to the family Leuciscidae, which includes the daces, chubs, Eurasian minnows and related species. It is found in Mexico and the United States.

== Description ==
Gila ditaenia, the Sonora chub is one of seven species of chub native to Arizona. This particular species is one of the smaller species of chub, rarely exceeding 200 millimeters in length. Most specimens in the United States never even exceed 125 millimeters. The Sonora chub's body is typically very chubby, hence its name, with fusiform and terete implications in some individuals. Sonora chubs can be distinguished if one notices the unusually small scales. There are 63 to 75 scales in a lateral line. They have eight fin rays on their dorsal, anal, and pelvic fins with some variation between seven or nine. Their pharyngeal teeth can also distinguish them from other chubs found in Arizona. They are usually very dark in color with two noticeable black stripes running parallel above and below the lateral line. They also have counter-shading patterns with very light underbellies for camouflage. During mating seasons, they will have red markings on their paired and anal fins, with orange areas on their bellies. A round spot at the base of their tails can easily identify them during their mating seasons.

== Distribution in Arizona ==
Sonora chubs have been endemic to the southwest regions of the United States for some time. They are primarily found in the Rio de la Concepcion drainages in Sonora, Mexico, and Arizona. Scattered records have been reported in the Rios Altar and Magdalena areas also. The tributaries of the Rios Altar are very important passageways for chubs, and it allows them to flow freely into Sycamore Creek in Beer Canyon, Arizona. They travel from Sycamore Creek down into Santa Cruz County during spawning seasons. The bulk of the records indicate that Penasco Creek in the Atascosa Mountains is the most popular habitat for chubs. The elevation restrictions are less than 305 to 1,219 m (1,001 to 3,999 ft). These numbers are based on records in the Heritage Data Management System (HDMS), as well as other studies from the AGFD reveal elevation ranges from 3,500–4,190 ft (1,070–1,280 m) (AGFD, unpublished data accessed 2001).

== Habitat ==
Sonora chubs concentrate themselves in the deepest and largest pools because they are more permanent, allowing a stable environment for their juveniles. They use the sandy bottoms of these larger pools to burrow their eggs and protect them from predators. They feed on aquatic and terrestrial insects as well as the large floating pads of algae in the larger pools. Periods of drought can however force them out of the deeper streams into shallower pools.

== Reproduction ==
Spawning usually occurs in the early spring months of the year, based upon studies conducted by Minckley in 1973. Larvae and juveniles have been found in Sycamore Creek and the Rio Altar in November, indicating that Sonora chubs do not restrict their spawning to the spring months. Strong sexual selection has appeared to have taken place in that most males depict highly exaggerated coloration patterns. The more desirable breeding males have evolved bright red and orange patterns on their fins to ensure their mating success. It has also been suggested that coloration patterns arise after spring and summer rains.

== Conservation ==
This species was placed on the endangered species list in 1988, and there are several projects currently attempting to recover their numbers. The habitat areas of Sycamore and Penasco Creek have been placed on critical status, meaning that these areas have strictly prohibited any interference or fishing. There is also a 12-metre (39 ft) riparian boundary zone, which further restricts access to these streams. Sycamore Creek has been highly modified by human activities such as mining, grazing, and recreation, as well as the introduction of foreign taxa. All of these factors are leading to the decline of this species. Sycamore is barely within the range of the tolerations of Sonora chubs, therefore it has been completely isolated to these waters, and if forced out, it will have nowhere to recover. These various human perturbations are being made worse by decreased watershed conditions and increasing drought conditions, and could ultimately lead to the extirpation of the species. There is also a concern for predation by non-native green sunfish, as is the case with the majority of Arizona fish on the endangered list. All of these conditions must be reversed, along with the stabilization of the watershed, in order to see a full recovery of this threatened species.

In 1995, G. ditaenia was identified in the California Gulch, a small intermittent or ephemeral tributary of the Sycamore Canyon that joins it in Mexico. The gulch, which is not included as critical habitat for the Sonora chub, may be impacted by the construction of the U.S.–Mexico border wall. The U.S. Fish and Wildlife Service anticipates that it will not make a determination on critical habitat status of the California Gulch, which contains at least two miles (3.2 km) of potential undammed habitat, until at least 2027. A one-time search for specimens in 2022 in this area did not locate any individuals, although this may have been due to low rainfall. The Arizona Game and Fish Department reports that it has had difficulty in regularly surveying populations due to security issues. According to a later press release from the petitioning Center for Biological Diversity, a border wall section was built over the California Gulch bed between 2023 and 2024 that may prevent upstream migration of Sonora chub during favorable hydrological periods.

== Sources ==
- Froese, Rainer; Pauly, Daniel, eds. (2012). "Gila ditaenia". FishBase.
