= Desert chub =

Conservation status
- Near Threatened (IUCN 3.1)

Scientific classification
- Kingdom: Animalia
- Phylum: Chordata
- Class: Actinopterygii
- Order: Cypriniformes
- Family: Leuciscidae
- Genus: Gila
- Species: G. eremica

Binomial name
- Gila eremica DeMarais, 1991

Species of fish

The desert chub (Gila eremica) is a species of freshwater ray-finned fish belonging to the family Leuciscidae, which includes the daces, chubs, Eurasian minnows and related species. This species is endemic to Mexico. It inhabits the headwaters of the Sonora and Mátape rivers of northwestern Mexico.
