= Shorttail chub =

Conservation status
- Data Deficient (IUCN 3.1)

Scientific classification
- Kingdom: Animalia
- Phylum: Chordata
- Class: Actinopterygii
- Order: Cypriniformes
- Family: Leuciscidae
- Genus: Gila
- Species: G. brevicauda

Binomial name
- Gila brevicauda S. M. Norris, J. M. Fischer & Minckley, 2003

Species of fish

The Shorttail chub (Gila brevicauda) is a species of freshwater ray-finned fish belonging to the family Leuciscidae, the daces, chubs, Eurasian minnows and related species. This fish is endemic to the Mayo River basin, Chihuahua, Mexico.
