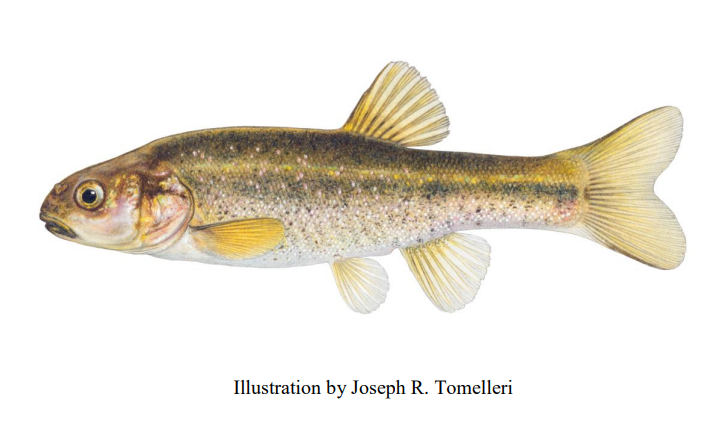
- Desert dace (illustration by Joseph R. Tomelleri)

Conservation status
- Vulnerable (IUCN 3.1)

- Critically Imperiled (NatureServe)

Scientific classification
- Kingdom: Animalia
- Phylum: Chordata
- Class: Actinopterygii
- Division: Teleostei
- Order: Cypriniformes
- Family: Leuciscidae
- Subfamily: Laviniinae
- Genus: Eremichthys; C. L. Hubbs and R. R. Miller, 1948
- Species: E. acros

Binomial name
- Eremichthys acros C. L. Hubbs and R. R. Miller, 1948
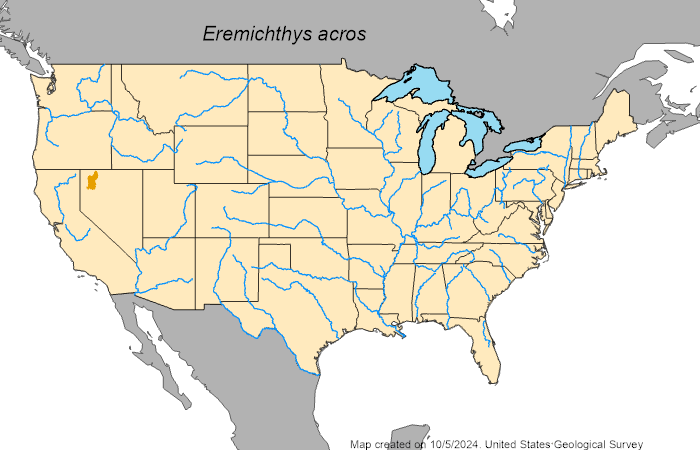

= Desert dace =

Species of fish

The desert dace (Eremichthys acros) is a rare species of freshwater ray-finned fish belonging to the family Leuciscidae, which includes the daces, chubs and related fishes. This fish is restricted to the warm springs and creeks of Soldier Meadow in western Humboldt County, Nevada, USA. It is the only member of the monotypic genus Eremichthys. The species is also notable for its ability to live in waters as warm as 38 °C (100 °F).

The desert dace reaches a maximum size of about 60 mm (2.4 inches). Its coloration is olive green on the back and silvery below, with vaguely mottled sides that flash with yellow reflections. There is some blackish spotting and a deep green streak along and above the lateral line. Dorsal and anal fins are usually eight-rayed. It is recognizable by the horny sheath, similar on both jaws as well as elongated intestine compatible with omnivorous feeding. It can be difficult to tell juvenile dace apart from adults, but adults have brighter colors. In contrast to many other species like the tui chub (Siphateles bicolor), desert dace can take advantage of thermal habitats and withstand lethal temperatures for most fish.

== Distribution ==
The desert dace species is only found in the thermal springs and the streams that emerge from Soldier Meadows in Humboldt County, Nevada. It is found in 8 major spring sites and around 5 kilometres (3.1 mi) of relevant outflow stream habitat.

Its geographical distribution of the desert dace fishes seems to be restricted within these thermal habitats, whose temperature ranges from 18°C to about 40°C. Some populations have been noted to settle downstream areas since they are cooler. Population studies have indicated catch rates as high as 21.8 fish per trap per hour in selected locations. However, populations are seasonal, and negative trends are reported where water abstraction and habitat destruction occur.

== Feeding ==
The desert dace is omnivorous, and its main food sources include small invertebrates and algae. Its other food sources include periphyton, an algal layer attached to the bottom surfaces and filamentous algae. Small insects or invertebrates of different sorts are frequently eaten; this makes the desert dace both a grazer and a predator.

== Life cycle ==
The desert dace breeds throughout the year, and spawning activity is recorded in March, May and November. Such spawning occurs when females deposit sticky eggs into the substrate in the thermal spring habitats. These eggs are not kept under active supervision by the parents, and a young dace appears after several days, depending on water temperature. Juveniles are found in shallow water within the spring outflows, and later, when they are more developed, they migrate to deeper regions.

Desert dace requires sexual maturity around 13 months, with a noticeable prevalence of females over males. Their average lifespan varies between one and three years, depending even on specific environmental conditions. Water temperature and food availability in isolated thermal spring environments may substantially impact growth rates and lifespan.

== Habitat ==
The desert dace species is endemic to the thermal spring system of Soldier Meadows, in western Humboldt County, Nevada. These spring systems are characterized by thermal ranges between 18 and 40 °C (64 and 104 °F), which suffices for the species to have essential environmental conditions critical for sustainability . As for the habitat, desert dace has been found mostly in spring pools, outflow streams and alkaline marshy soils. All these springs are completely artesian and tap water that is thermally recharged and is situated at very deep depths before resurfacing.

Desert dace populations are highest in the lower cool areas of the spring, where water temperatures range from 21 to 24 °C (70 to 75 °F), thus creating optimal spawning conditions. The water temperature correlates with the species' seasonal distribution within these systems. In summer seasons, dace migrate downstream in search of cooler areas, whereas in winter, heater temperatures force them to migrate upstream.

Water diversion for agriculture, recreational use of springs, and overgrazing by livestock and wild horses have contributed to habitat destruction in Soldier Meadows. Introducing non-native fishes, such as those brought into the nearby reservoirs, constantly threatens the desert dace habitat. Despite these factors, there are attempts to mitigate the damages and damage control to enhance the restoration of these important habitats through conservation practices.

== Conservation ==
The desert dace (Eremichthys acros) was declared a threatened species in 1985 under the Endangered Species Act due to habitat loss, degradation, and other human-related activities. The U.S. Fish and Wildlife Service developed critical habitat areas for the species' conservation, including the Soldier Meadows thermal spring system, which was set up as a recovery measure. The species is still vulnerable under the IUCN classification system (IUCN 3.1).

As a result, many people were driven to implement several conservation strategies to help conserve both the desert dace and its habitat. Fencing projects have been used to protect critical spring habitats from misuse, and road maintenance has been done to ensure the desert dace does not get stuck on the roads. In 2015, the Nevada Department of Wildlife (NDOW) and federal partners fenced springheads in Fly Canyon to reduce the impacts of feral horses and burros on the habitat. Further, in August 2021, the Bureau of Land Management (BLM) carried out temporary works to recontour road crossings that created pools of water in the dace's habitat and threatened to strand the fish. Other activities aimed at road reconstruction are being planned to avoid future habitat disturbance.

In 2021, the U.S. Fish and Wildlife Service began working on the five-year status review for the desert dace and noted the importance of further conservation of the species, which continues to be at risk from habitat alteration and climate change. This review brought attention to issues like habitat alteration, exotic species and climate change that remain a threat to the long-term existence of the desert dace.

The main anthropogenic pressures faced by the desert dace are described, such as water withdrawal for irrigation purposes, which brings about habitat changes, activities related to aquaculture that disturb thermal spring systems, and even introduced invasive species. These threats are aggravated by climate change, which affects the direction and temperature of the springs, which are important for the dace.

Although some measures were taken, such as installing barriers for fish and conducting public outreach to mitigate or raise awareness about the threat posed by other fish species, the recovery goals the U.S. Fish and Wildlife Service laid out are still not achieved. Population sizes can only be maintained, and the viability of the desert dace species in the long term is assured by constant monitoring, habitat rehabilitation, and control of invasive species.
