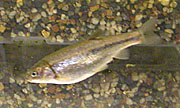

Conservation status
- Vulnerable (IUCN 3.1)

Scientific classification
- Kingdom: Animalia
- Phylum: Chordata
- Class: Actinopterygii
- Order: Cypriniformes
- Family: Leuciscidae
- Genus: Gila
- Species: G. orcuttii

Binomial name
- Gila orcuttii C. H. Eigenmann & R. S. Eigenmann, 1890
- Gila orcuttii Range Map, from IUCN Red List Version 2022-2023

= Arroyo chub =

Species of fish

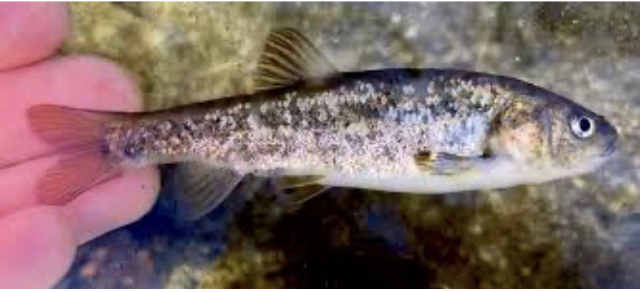
Photograph of an adult Arroyo chub (Gila orcuttii) showing characteristic features including the fusiform body shape, small subterminal mouth, and silver-gray coloration with a faint lateral stripe.

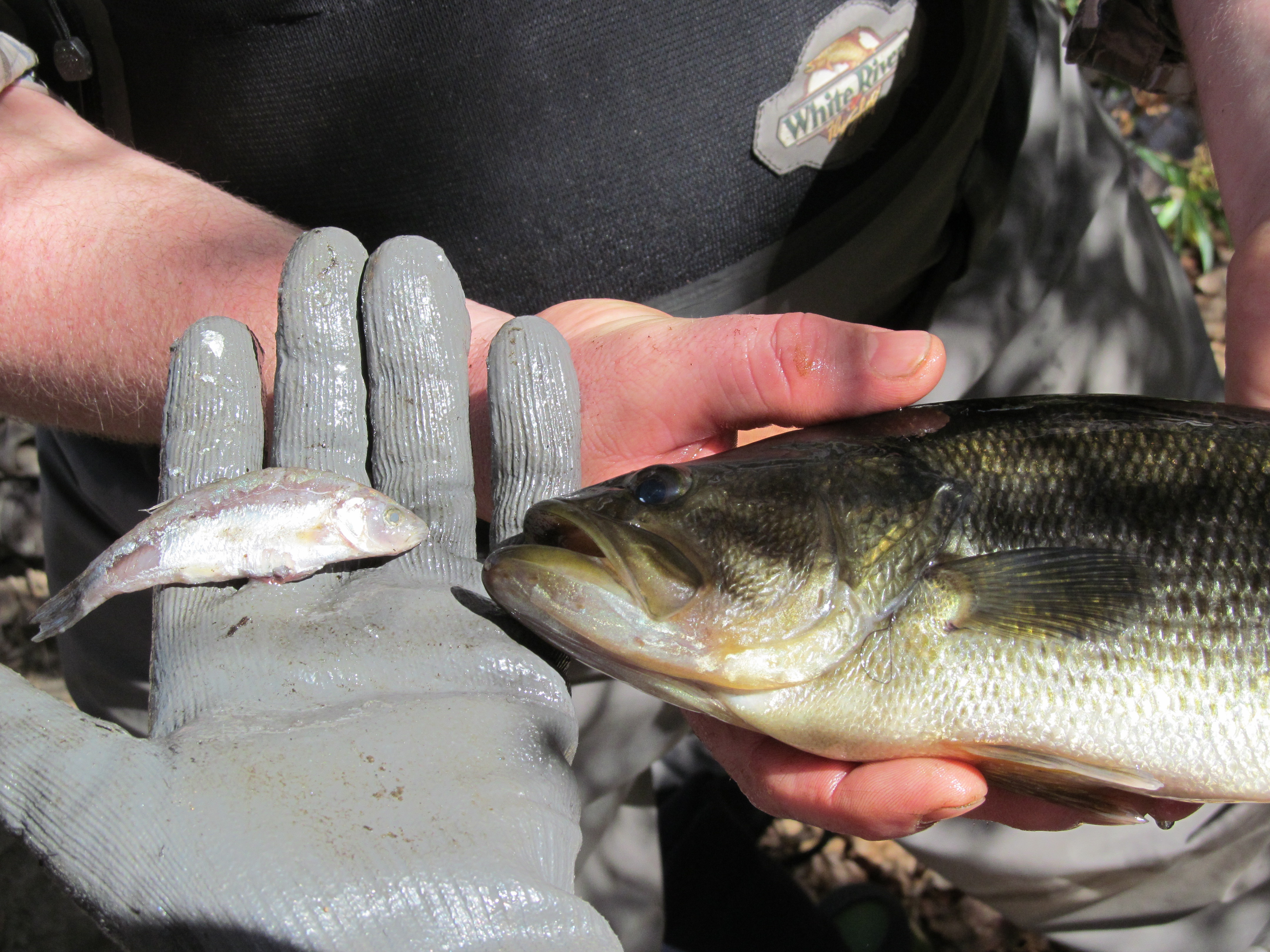
An arroyo chub that has been recovered from an invasive largemouth bass

The arroyo chub (Gila orcuttii) is a species of freshwater ray-finned fish belonging to the family Leuciscidae, which includes the daces, chubs, Eurasian minnows and related species. This species is found only in the coastal streams of southern California, United States.

== Description ==
The Arroyo chub is a small to moderately small fish with a robust, fusiform body and a thick caudal peduncle. It has a rounded snout, a terminal to slightly subterminal mouth, and proportionally large eyes.

Coloration: The dorsal surface is typically olive or gray, transitioning to silver or white on the ventral side. Many individuals display a faint lateral stripe.

Fin anatomy: The species exhibits the typical cyprinid arrangement of a single dorsal fin along with pectoral, pelvic, anal, and forked caudal fins. The dorsal fin has 8 rays, and the anal fin has 7 rays. Males often develop enlarged fins and breeding tubercles on the pectoral fins during the spawning season.

Size: Adults generally reach 7–10 cm (2.8–3.9 in), with larger individuals approaching 12 cm (4.7 in).

== Distribution and habitat ==
=== Native range ===
The Arroyo chub is native to coastal streams of Southern California, occurring primarily in Los Angeles, Orange, Riverside, and San Diego counties. Its range includes drainages of the Los Angeles River (including the Arroyo Seco), San Gabriel River, Santa Ana River, San Juan Creek, Malibu Creek, Santa Margarita River, and San Luis Rey River systems. Recent surveys have detected the species in 18 of 40 sampled streams across all seven historically occupied watersheds, though often restricted to upper or less-disturbed reaches.

=== Introduced range ===
Human-mediated introductions have been documented in the Santa Ynez River, Santa Clara River, Ventura River, Santa Maria River, Cuyama River, and Mojave River drainages. These introductions are believed to stem from bait bucket releases and accidental transfers during trout stocking.

== Habitat preferences ==
The Arroyo chub is a habitat generalist meaning it is capable of thriving in a broad variety of environmental conditions rather than being restricted to a narrow habitat type. However, it tends to favor flowing pools, runs, and slow to moderate current zones in small to medium-sized streams with sandy or muddy substrates.

The species tolerates warm temperatures, hypoxic summer conditions, and high-flow winter periods. Reported thermal tolerance ranges from approximately 10 to 24–26 °C (50 to 75–79 °F). Arroyo chub are frequently found in deeper (>40 cm (16 in)) pool habitats, especially those providing vegetative cover or shelter. They can also persist in intermittent streams, surviving in remnant pools during dry periods.

Arroyo Chubs exhibit high mobility within their watersheds, with movement patterns primarily driven by seasonal cues. During summer months, juveniles typically inhabit shallow pools and areas with instream cover. Conversely, during periods of winter flooding, they shelter under log jams and other large woody debris for refugia.

== Diet and behavior ==
Arroyo chub are omnivorous. Their diet includes algae, aquatic insects, small crustaceans, and in some cases mollusks or insect larvae (e.g. caddisfly larvae) depending on habitat conditions. In warmer water systems, algae may dominate their diet, making up a large proportion of stomach contents; in cooler creek systems, more invertebrate prey may be important. In the northern portion of its range, roots of the floating water fern (Azolla filiculoides) constitutes a significant component of the species' diet.

Spawning typically occurs in spring through summer (February to August in some reports), with peak activity in June-July. Females release small batches of eggs, which adhere to vegetation, substrate, or debris. Eggs hatch in about 4 days at 24 °C (75 °F), larvae initially remain near the substrate before swimming upward to fill their swim bladders, and juveniles often congregate in slow or still water with vegetation cover. Juvenile fish may reach roughly 60 mm (2.4 in) in the first year.

Hybridization: introduced populations of G. orcuttii have hybridized with the endangered Mohave tui chub (Gila bicolor mohavensis) in some cases, threatening genetic integrity of the tui chub.

== Conservation status and threats ==
=== Status ===
- Listed as Vulnerable by the IUCN.
- Ranked G1 (critically imperiled) by NatureServe.
- Designated a Species of Special Concern by the State of California.

=== Threats ===
Major threats include:

- Habitat loss and alteration from urbanization, flood control channelization, water diversions, and modification of natural stream structure
- Introduction of non-native predators and competitors
- Hybridization with closely related species, notably the endangered Mohave tui chub
- Drought-driven reductions in flow, especially within intermittent stream systems
- Pollution, sedimentation, degraded water quality, and bank disturbance

Most populations have retreated into upstream refuges as lower watershed habitats have been degraded or lost.

== Conservation actions ==
Conservation efforts focus on habitat restoration, reintroduction, and population monitoring. Projects such as the Central Arroyo Seco Stream Restoration Program aim to create backwater habitats, install woody structures and flow deflectors, and improve channel complexity to support stable populations. Genetic monitoring is ongoing to detect hybridization risks, particularly in areas where introductions have occurred.

== Ecological and human importance ==
Arroyo chub play a significant ecological role in Southern California stream ecosystems. As omnivores, they help regulate algal growth and serve as prey for native birds, reptiles, and larger fishes. Their presence is often used as an indicator of stream health, given their sensitivity to severe habitat degradation.

From a conservation standpoint, protecting Arroyo chub populations contributes to preserving biodiversity in one of the most human-modified freshwater regions in North America. Restoring their habitat also benefits numerous other native aquatic species.

== Taxonomy and naming ==
Gila orcuttii was first described by C. H. Eigenmann & R. S. Eigenmann in 1890. The species name honors Charles Russell Orcutt, an early collector and naturalist. The genus Gila includes several species of chubs, and distinguishing among them can be challenging due to overlapping ranges and occasional hybridization.
