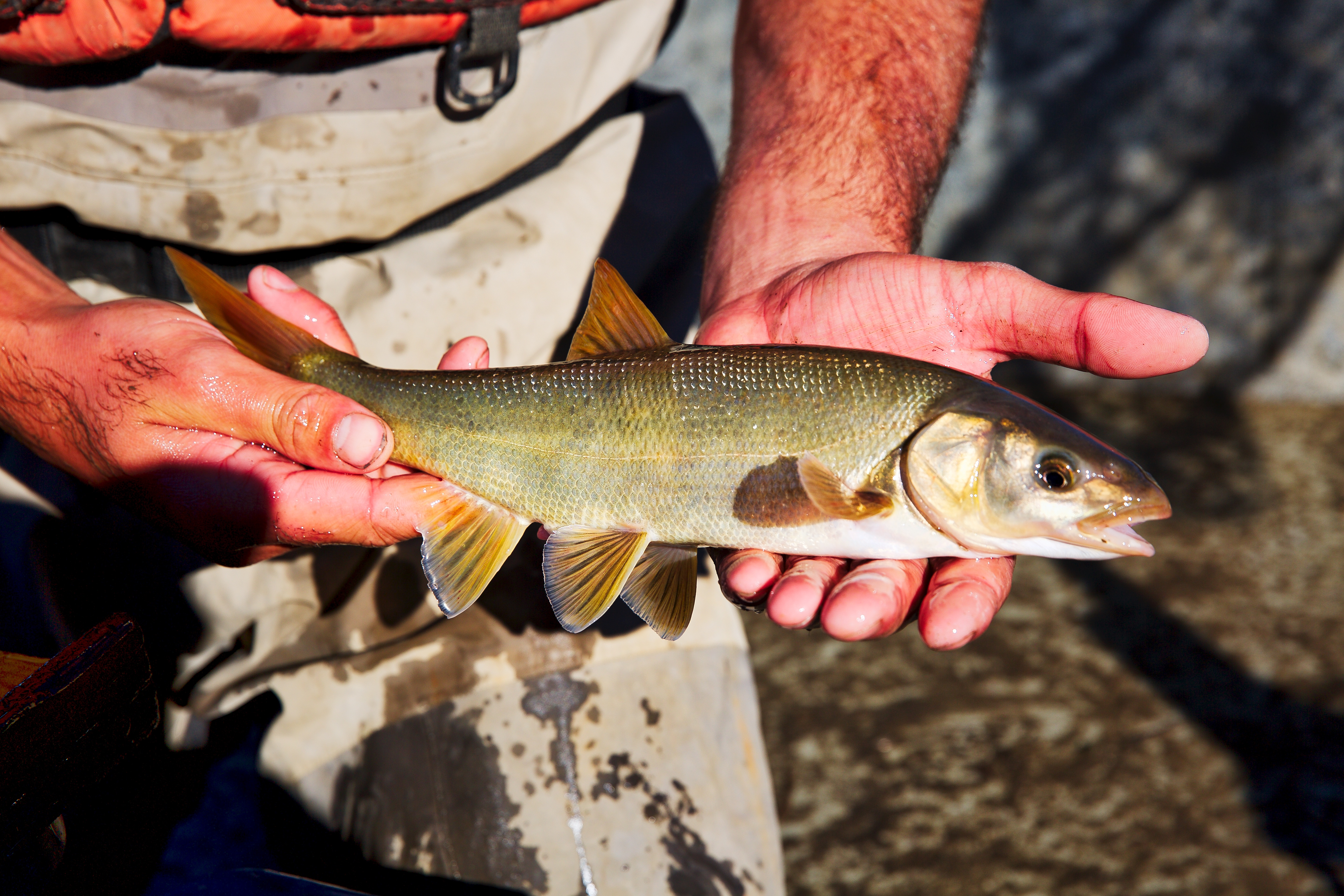

Scientific classification
- Kingdom: Animalia
- Phylum: Chordata
- Class: Actinopterygii
- Order: Cypriniformes
- Family: Leuciscidae
- Subfamily: Laviniinae
- Genus: Mylopharodon; Ayres, 1855

Type species
- Mylopharodon robustus Ayres, 1855

= Mylopharodon =

Genus of fishes

Mylopharodon is a genus of freshwater ray-finned fishes belonging to the family Leuciscidae, which includes the daces, chubs and related fishes. The genus contains one extant species and two extinct species, all of which are found in Western North America.

== Species ==
Mylopharodon contains the following species:

- Mylopharodon conocephalus Ayres, 1855 (Hardhead)
- †Mylopharodon doliolus Smith & Kimmel, 1982 - Middle Miocene-aged Esmeralda Formation of Nevada
- †Mylopharodon hagermanensis Uyeno, 1961 - Pliocene-aged Glenns Ferry Formation of Idaho.
