= Pahranagat roundtail chub =

Conservation status
- Critically Imperiled (NatureServe)

Scientific classification
- Kingdom: Animalia
- Phylum: Chordata
- Class: Actinopterygii
- Order: Cypriniformes
- Family: Leuciscidae
- Genus: Gila
- Species: G. jordani

Binomial name
- Gila jordani Tanner, 1950

Species of fish

The Pahranagat roundtail chub (Gila jordani), or White River chub, is a species of freshwater ray-finned fish belonging to the family Leuciscidae, the daces, chubs, Eurasian minnows and related species. This fish is endemic to the outflows of thermal springs in the Pahranagat Valley , as well as the Pahranagat River itself, although it is now restricted, in the wild, to a single spring within its historic native range.
