= Relict dace =

Conservation status
- Near Threatened (IUCN 3.1)

Scientific classification
- Kingdom: Animalia
- Phylum: Chordata
- Class: Actinopterygii
- Order: Cypriniformes
- Family: Leuciscidae
- Subfamily: Laviniinae
- Genus: Relictus; C. L. Hubbs & R. R. Miller, 1972
- Species: R. solitarius

Binomial name
- Relictus solitarius C. L. Hubbs & R. R. Miller, 1972

Species of fish

The relict dace (Relictus solitarius) is a species of freshwater ray-finned fish belonging to the family Leuciscidae, which includes the daces, chubs, Eurasian minnows and related fishes. This fish occurs in the Great Basin of western North America. It is the only species in the monotypic genus Relictus.

Relict dace coloration is variable, but generally dusky overall, with olive and brassy shades dorsally. An obvious speckling pattern with patches ranging from brown to green, and yellowish narrow stripes appear on the back and belly. Lower fins are often yellow, and may be a bright golden shade. The oblique mouth is terminal, and lacks horny cutting edges. The fins are rather small and rounded, with the pelvic fins being especially notable for their paddle shape. The variations on the basic cyprinid plan seem to be characteristic of desert fishes evolving in isolation, with the body adapting for midwater swimming in quiet water.

The relict dace occurs in only a handful of habitats in eastern Nevada, all of which were once covered by the prehistoric Lake Lahontan. Locations include the springs of Buttle and Ruby Valleys, and the drainage systems of Franklin Lake and Gale Lake.
