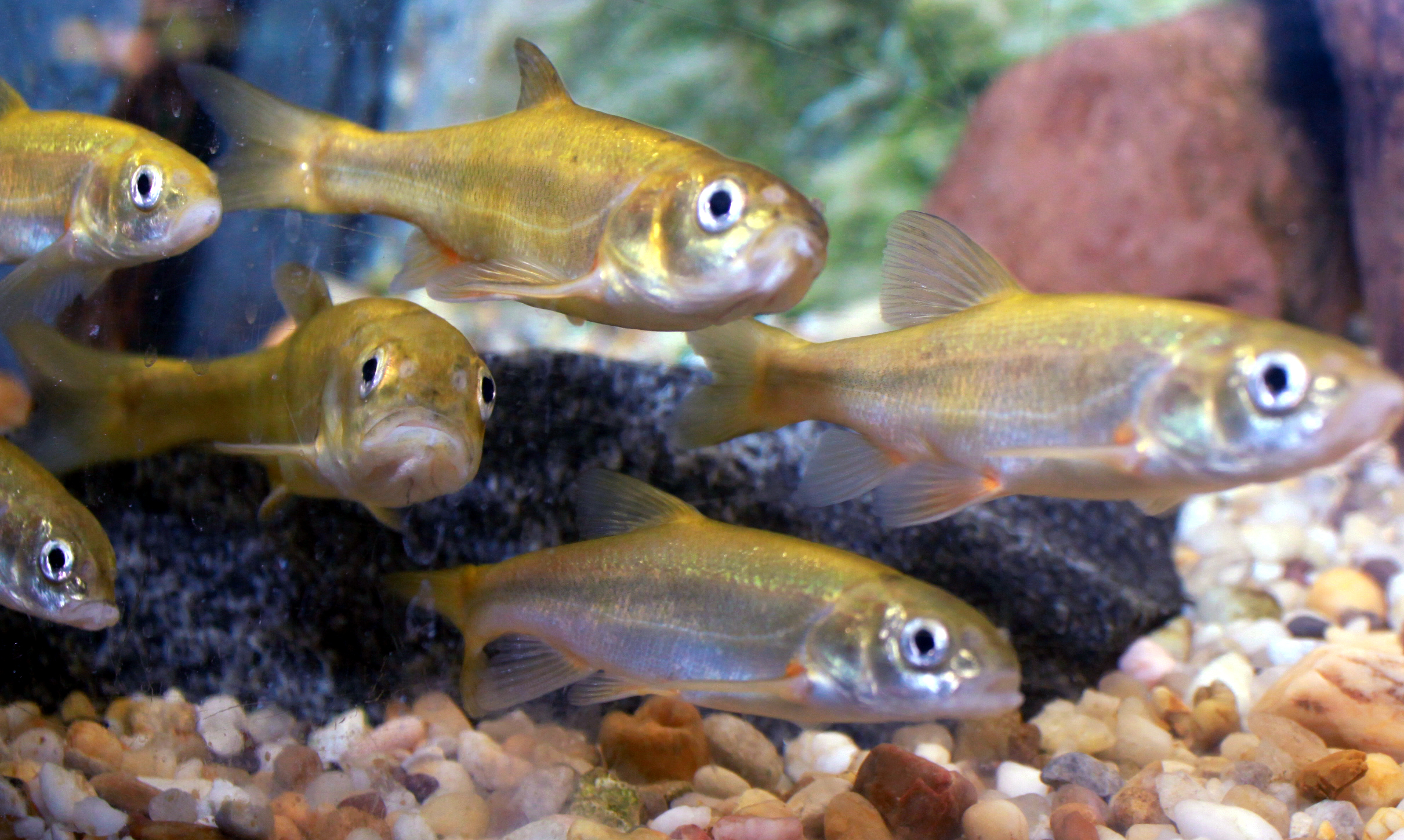

Conservation status
- Vulnerable (IUCN 3.1)

Scientific classification
- Kingdom: Animalia
- Phylum: Chordata
- Class: Actinopterygii
- Order: Cypriniformes
- Family: Leuciscidae
- Genus: Gila
- Species: G. nigrescens

Binomial name
- Gila nigrescens (Girard, 1856)

Synonyms
- Tigoma nigrescens Girard, 1856; Gila pulchella Baird & Girard, 1854

= Chihuahua chub =

Species of fish

The Chihuahua chub (Gila nigrescens) is a species of freshwater ray-finned fish belonging to the family Leuciscidae, which includes the daces, chubs, Eurasian minnows and related species. It is found in Chihuahua, Mexico and in New Mexico, United States. The males can reach 24 cm (9.5 in) in length.
