= Nazas chub =

Conservation status
- Data Deficient (IUCN 3.1)

Scientific classification
- Kingdom: Animalia
- Phylum: Chordata
- Class: Actinopterygii
- Order: Cypriniformes
- Family: Leuciscidae
- Genus: Gila
- Species: G. conspersa

Binomial name
- Gila conspersa Garman, 1881

Species of fish

The Nazas chub (Gila conspersa) is a species of freshwater ray-finned fish belonging to the family Leuciscidae, which includes the daces, chubs, Eurasian minnows and related species. This fish is endemic to Mexico where it is found in the endorheic drainage systems of the Nazas and the Aguanaval basin, which flow into the Bolsón de Mapimí, in the States of Coahuila, Durango and Zacatecas.
