= Salinas chub =

Conservation status
- Endangered (IUCN 3.1)

Scientific classification
- Kingdom: Animalia
- Phylum: Chordata
- Class: Actinopterygii
- Division: Teleostei
- Order: Cypriniformes
- Family: Leuciscidae
- Genus: Gila
- Species: G. modesta

Binomial name
- Gila modesta (Garman, 1881)

Synonyms
- Cheonda modestus Garman, 1881

Species of fish

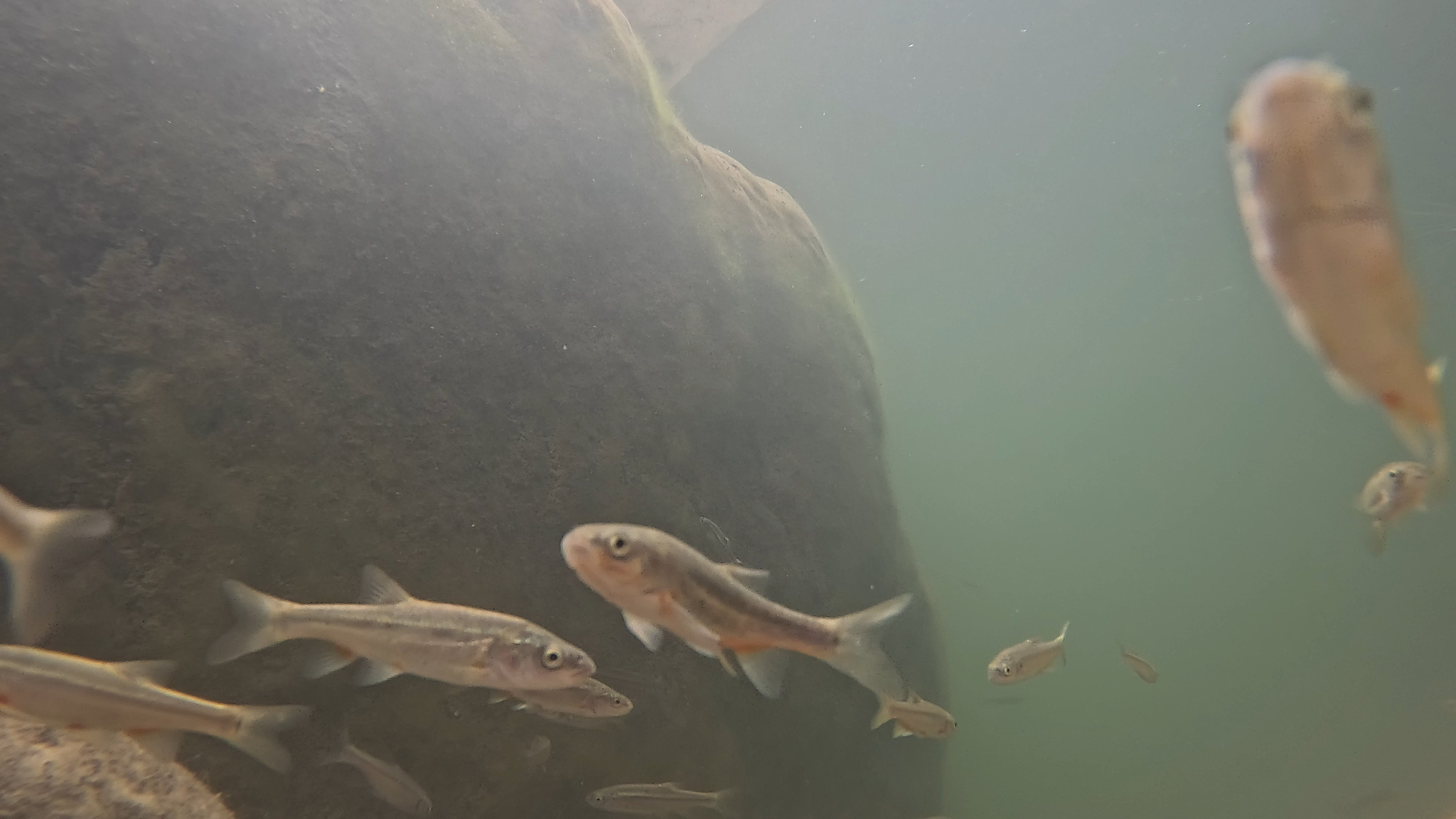
Saltillo Chub (Gila modesta) in Mexico

Salinas chub (Gila modesta) is a species of freshwater ray-finned fish belonging to the family Leuciscidae, which includes the daces, chubs, Eurasian minnows and related species. This species is endemic to northeastetern Mexico in the Chorro stream, part of the headwaters of the Río Salinas catchment in the Rio San Juan basin near Saltillo in Coahuila, it is classified as endangered.
