= Conchos chub =

Conservation status
- Data Deficient (IUCN 3.1)

Scientific classification
- Kingdom: Animalia
- Phylum: Chordata
- Class: Actinopterygii
- Order: Cypriniformes
- Family: Leuciscidae
- Genus: Gila
- Species: G. pulchra

Binomial name
- Gila pulchra (Girard, 1856)

Species of fish

The Conchos chub (Gila pulchra) is a cyprinid fish endemic to Mexico.
