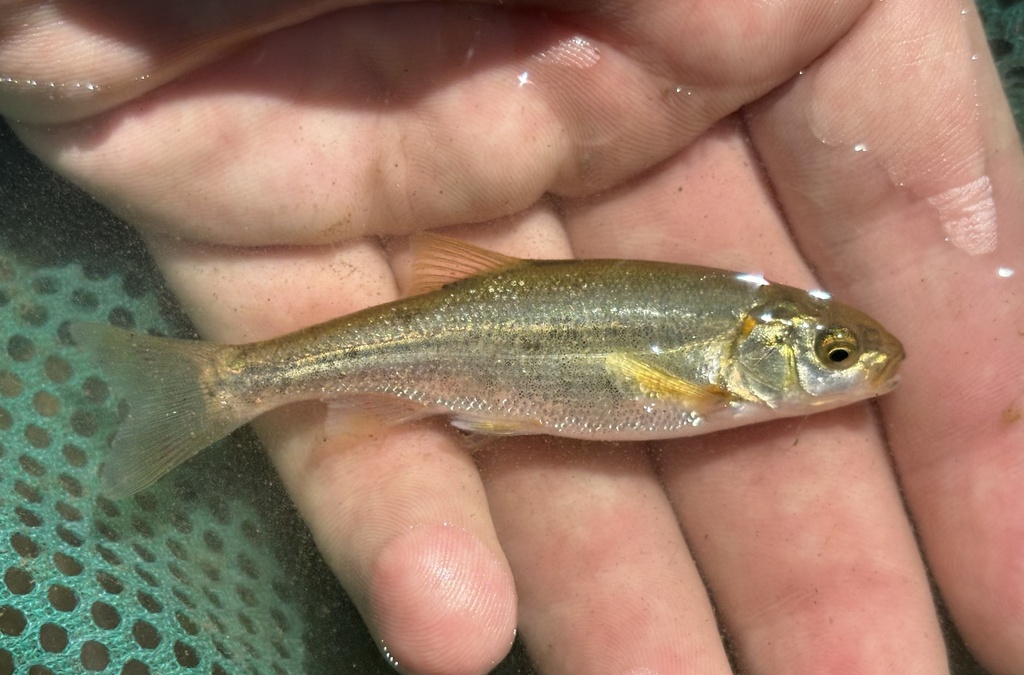

Scientific classification
- Kingdom: Animalia
- Phylum: Chordata
- Class: Actinopterygii
- Order: Cypriniformes
- Family: Leuciscidae
- Genus: Hesperoleucus
- Species: H. venustus

Binomial name
- Hesperoleucus venustus Snyder, 1913

Synonyms
- Hesperoleucus navarroensis Snyder, 1913; Hesperoleucus subditus Snyder, 1913

= Coastal roach =

Species of fish

The coastal roach (Hesperoleucus venustus) is a species of freshwater ray-finned fish belonging to the family Leuciscidae, which includes the daces, chubs, Eurasian minnows and related species. This species is endemic to the coastal rivers of California, the most northerly population is in the Navarro River, then in the Russian River south to Tomales Bay, the drainage of San Francisco Bay but are absent in catchments south of there until the populations in the Salinas and Pajaro rivers. There is a population in the Soquel Creek in Santa Cruz County which was probably introduced from the Salinas River. The population in the Cuyama River may be native.
