= Mylopharodon hagermanensis =

Scientific classification
- Kingdom: Animalia
- Phylum: Chordata
- Class: Actinopterygii
- Order: Cypriniformes
- Family: Leuciscidae
- Genus: Mylopharodon
- Species: †M. hagermanensis

Binomial name
- †Mylopharodon hagermanensis Uyeno, 1961

Extinct species of fish

Mylopharodon hagermanensis is an extinct species of freshwater ray-finned fish belonging to the family Leuciscidae, the family which includes the chubs, daces, Eurasian minnows and related species. This Pliocene species is found in the Hagerman Fossil Beds of the Glenns Ferry Formation.
