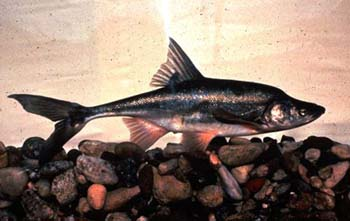
- Bonytail chub, Gila elegans

Scientific classification
- Kingdom: Animalia
- Phylum: Chordata
- Class: Actinopterygii
- Order: Cypriniformes
- Family: Leuciscidae
- Subfamily: Laviniinae
- Genus: Gila; S. F. Baird & Girard, 1853

Type species
- Gila robusta Baird & Girard, 1853

Species
- About 20, see text

Synonyms
- Acrocheilus Agassiz, 1855; Siboma Girard, 1856; Tigoma Girard, 1856; Protoporus Cope, 1872; Myloleucus Cope, 1872; Temeculina Cockerell, 1909; Klamathella Miller, 1945; Moapa Hubbs & Miller, 1948

= Gila (fish) =

Gila Temporal range: Middle Miocene to present, 12–0 Ma

Genus of fishes

Gila is a genus of fish belonging to the family Leuciscidae, native to the United States and Mexico. Species of Gila are collectively referred to as western chubs. The species in the genus Siphateles are close relatives. Several members of the genus are endangered or extinct due to loss of habitat caused by diversion or overuse of water resources, particularly in the western United States.

== Species ==
Gila contains the following valid recent species:

- Gila alutacea (Agassiz & Pickering, 1855) (Chiselmouth)
- Gila atraria (Girard, 1856) (Utah chub)
- Gila brevicauda S. M. Norris, J. M. Fischer & W. L. Minckley, 2003 (Shorttail chub)
- Gila coerulea (Girard, 1856) (Blue chub)
- Gila conspersa Garman, 1881 (Nazas chub)
- Gila coriacea (Hubbs & Miller, 1948) (Moapa dace)
- †Gila crassicauda (S. F. Baird & Girard, 1854) (Thicktail chub (extinct: late 1950s))
- Gila cypha Miller, 1946 (Humpback chub)
- Gila ditaenia Miller, 1945 (Sonora chub)
- Gila elegans Baird & Girard, 1853 (Bonytail chub)
- Gila eremica DeMarais, 1991 (Desert chub)
- Gila jordani Tanner, 1950 (Pahranagat roundtail chub)
- Gila minacae Meek, 1902 (Mexican roundtail chub)
- Gila modesta (Garman, 1881) (Salinas chub)
- Gila nigrescens (Girard, 1856) (Chihuahua chub)
- Gila orcuttii (C. H. Eigenmann & Eigenmann, 1890) (Arroyo chub)
- Gila pandora (Cope, 1872) (Rio Grande chub)
- Gila pulchra (Girard, 1856) (Conchos chub)
- Gila purpurea (Girard, 1856) (Yaqui chub)
- Gila robusta Baird & Girard, 1853 (Roundtail chub)
- Gila seminuda Cope & Yarrow, 1875 (Virgin chub)

The following fossil species are known:

- ?†Gila cristifera Uyeno & Miller, 1965 - middle Pliocene-aged Bidahochi Formation of Arizona
- ?†Gila esmeralda (La Rivers, 1966) - middle/late Miocene-aged Esmeralda Formation of Nevada
- †Gila milleri Smith, 1975 - Pliocene-aged Glenns Ferry Formation of Idaho
- †Gila turneri (Lucas, 1900) - middle/late Miocene-aged Esmeralda Formation of Nevada
