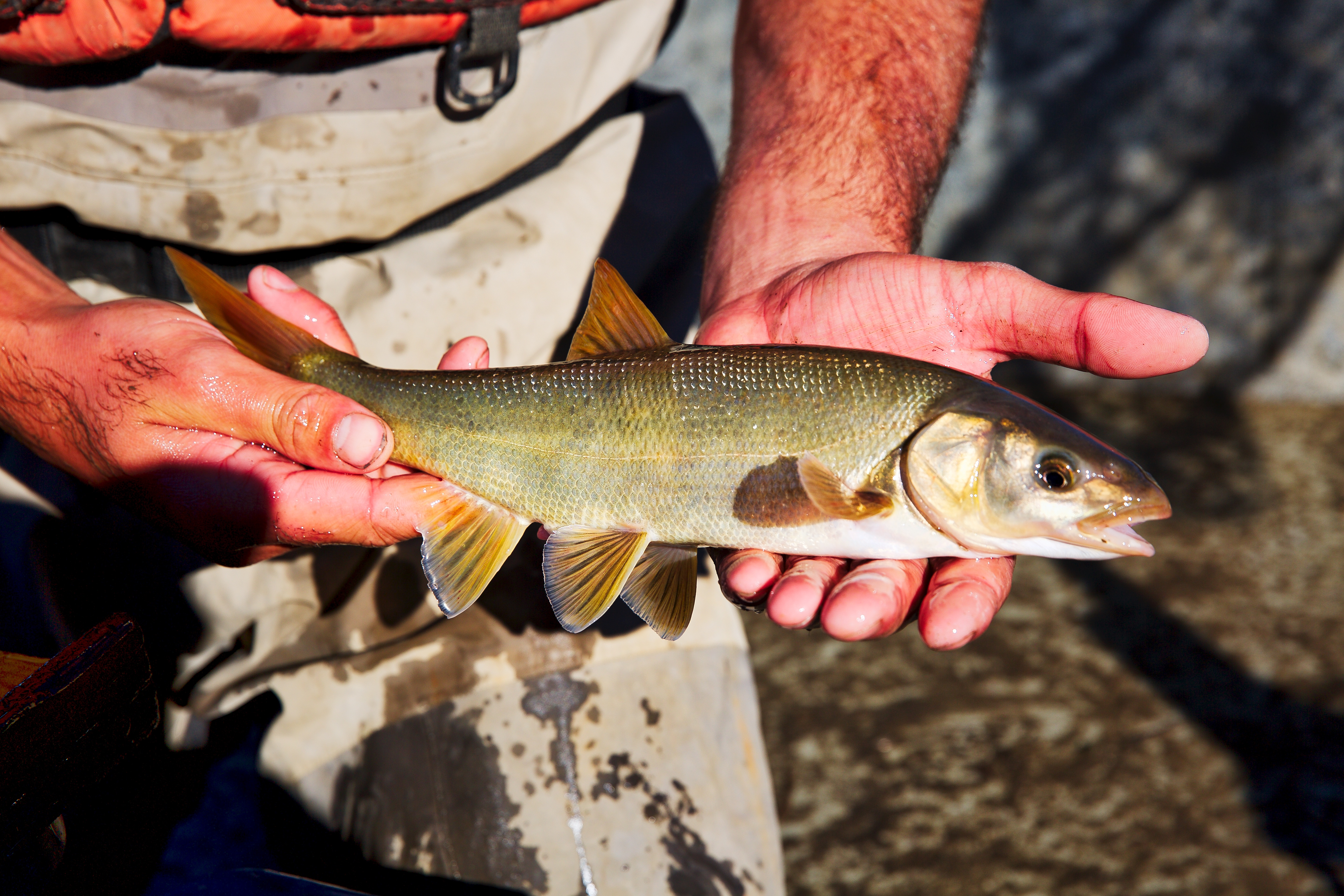

Conservation status
- Least Concern (IUCN 3.1)

- Vulnerable (NatureServe)

Scientific classification
- Kingdom: Animalia
- Phylum: Chordata
- Class: Actinopterygii
- Division: Teleostei
- Order: Cypriniformes
- Family: Leuciscidae
- Genus: Mylopharodon
- Species: M. conocephalus

Binomial name
- Mylopharodon conocephalus (S.F. Baird & Girard, 1854)
- Mylopharodon conocephalus range map

Synonyms
- Gila conocephala Baird & Girard, 1854; Mylopharodon robustus Ayres, 1855

= Mylopharodon conocephalus =

Mylopharodon conocephalus Temporal range: Middle Miocene to present

Species of fish

Mylopharodon conocephalus, known as the hardhead, is a freshwater ray-finned fish from the family Leuciscidae, which includes the daces, Eurasian minnows and related fishes. which is endemic to California. It is the sole extant member of the genus Mylopharodon.

== Description ==
The hardhead has an elongated, slender body which is brown to dusky bronze above, the larger fish being darkest, with silver sides. The dorsal fin has its origin behind that of the pelvic fin, It has 69–81 scales on its lateral line; the dorsal fin has 8 rays. The jaws are not extendable and there is a premaxillary frenum. The snout is long and pointed, ending with the large, terminal mouth which reaches back to the front of the eye. It has 2.5-4.2 pharyngeal teeth.

The juvenile fish are silvery. The adult males grow small white nuptial tubercles on the head and on a band extending from the head to the caudal peduncle in the spring spawning season.

It can grow up to 60 centimetres (24 in) standard length, but is more often around 35 cm (14 in). Some reports cite fish as large as 100 centimetres (39 in).

== Distribution ==
The range of the hardhead includes much of the drainage basin of the Sacramento and San Joaquin in California, and within the range it is widely distributed in the foothill streams. The Kern River, Kern County, is the southernmost part of the range and it reaches north to the Pit River drainage in Modoc County. It is absent from the Clear Lake basin and from most of the streams draining into San Francisco Bay, other than the Napa River and Russian River, where it still uncommon.

== Biology and ecology ==
=== Habitat ===
Hardhead habitat includes deep pools over rocky and sandy substrates in small to large rivers. It shows to preference for deep, clear pools which have substrates consisting of sand, gravel or boulders and a slow current with relatively undisturbed conditions. Adult hardhead normally occur in schools in the deepest part of pools, where the slowly cruise around during the day, becoming more active in early morning and evening when they feed.

At low and mid elevations they are often found in larger streams. They may be present in some mid-elevation reservoirs, but the populations in reservoirs is usually temporary as populations may grow large, then rapidly decline.

While hardhead tend to be found in the lower half of the water column in rivers and streams, in places with slower flows or still waters, such as reservoirs, it can be found close to surface. In some reservoirs large adults have been observed sitting close to the surface on warm summer days which makes them vulnerable to predation by large fish-eating birds such as the osprey and the bald eagle.

Very frequently it is found in association with the Sacramento pikeminnow (Ptychocheilus grandis) and the Sacramento sucker (Catostomus occidentalis). It is seldom found in waters where invasive species, especially freshwater sunfish, are dominant.

=== Diet and growth ===
Hardhead are predominantly bottom feeders, consuming invertebrates and aquatic plants from stream beds although they will also feed on insects and algae drifting higher in the water column. They will occasionally take plankton and surface insects. In Shasta Reservoir, they were recorded feeding on cladocerans. Hardheads of less than 20 centimetres (7.9 in) mainly prey on benthic invertebrates, in particular the larvae of mayflies and caddis flies, as well as small snails. Larger fish graze on filamentous algae, as well as preying on crayfish and other large invertebrates. As the fish mature their tooth structure changes; the juveniles have hooked teeth for catching insects, and later develop more molar-like crushing teeth better adapted to grind plant material and larger invertebrates. They do not appear to eat other fish.

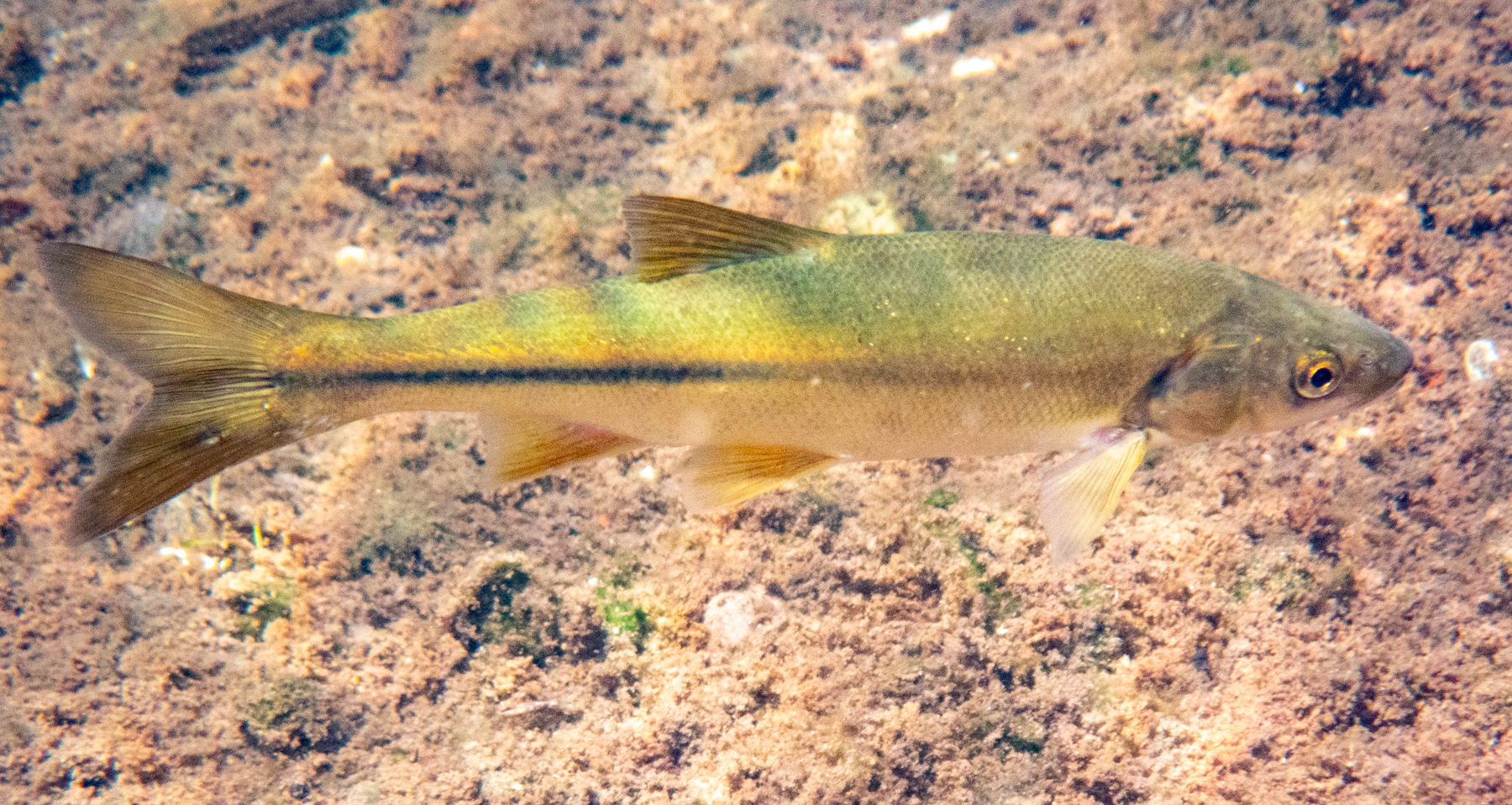
Foraging in the Russian River. Photo courtesy of Don Loarie.

They can attain 7–8 centimetres (2.8–3.1 in) in standard length after a year and by the end of the second year lengths of 10–12 centimetres (3.9–4.7 in) and 16–17 centimetres (6.3–6.7 in) by the end of their third year. In the American River hardheads can reach 30 centimetres (12 in) by the age of four but in the Pit River and the Feather River fish only reach this size at age 5 or 6. Hardheads from the Feather River which had grown to 44–45 centimetres (17–18 in) were aged at 9–10 years old, considered older and larger than fish that occur in the Sacramento River. Hardhead found in smaller streams rarely reach longer than 28 centimetres (11 in) while old records suggest that this species attained total lengths of up to 1 metre (3.3 ft).

=== Reproduction ===
Hardhead reach sexual maturity after their second year and spawn in April and May when the adults migrate upstream into the smaller tributary streams. Females have been found with mature eggs in March and specimens of both sexes examined in July and August had spent gonads. It has been estimated that the spawning occurs at different times based on location, with juvenile recruitment suggesting that hardhead spawn by May–June in the streams of the Central Valley but at higher altitudes it may extend into August, for example in foothill streams. The adults may migrate more than 75 kilometres (47 mi) from larger rivers and reservoirs may to spawn in smaller tributary streams while fish from in smaller waters will migrate short distances, either upstream or downstream, from their home pool to breed, seldom more than 1 kilometre (0.62 mi) from their home pool. Although the spawning of hardheads in the wild has never been observed it is thought to be similar to the spawning of the closely related Hitch (Lavinia exilicauda) and Sacramento pikeminnow (Ptychocheilus grandis), both species which lay their fertilized eggs in sand or gravel substrates in well oxygenated water such as riffles, rills, or faster flows at upper ends of pools. The breeding success of hardhead appears to be highest when the highest flows of a river occur between April and June.

The females are very fecund and can produce over 20,000 eggs but the egg load can vary from 7,100 to 23,900 eggs. The eggs seem to mature after a full year as ovaries can contain both mature and undeveloped eggs. It is thought that the fertilized eggs develop among the gravel and that the larval and post-larval fry probably prefer the edges of streams where they can find thick vegetation to provide cover. As the young fish grow they move into deeper waters and where the streams they were hatched in are intermittent they can be swept down to the stream mouth by the current. Small juveniles of 2–5 centimetres (0.79–1.97 in) in standard length may form in large schools in shallow backwaters and among cobbles and boulders near stream banks.

== Conservation ==
Hardheads were formerly widespread throughout their range but the populations have become fragmented with the populations in many of the mainstreams of the rivers being extirpated, leaving foothill populations isolated. This has been caused by habitat alteration which makes the stream unsuitable for this specialised species. In one stream which seems to be largely unaltered, the Cosumnes River, hardheads are absent with an invasion of redeye bass (Micropterus coosae) being seen as the probable cause of their extirpation. Hardheads are largely absent from reservoirs where there are extreme annual variations in water level, although they have been found to survive in small numbers in hydroelectric reservoirs where water levels are more stable. They also appear to be vulnerable to invasive predatory fish in reservoirs, generally impoundment and damming do not favour hardheads and tend to favour introduced fish species. Hardheads seem to be especially vulnerable to the introduction of predatory bass from the family Centrarchidae. They are also vulnerable to pollution from agricultural runoff and their presence in midden sites of native peoples in the Sacramento and San Joaquin basins show that they were previously much more abundant and widespread than they are currently. In general, the simplification of water regimes, pollution and introduction of exotic fish have caused declines in this species which was also persecuted as a competitor to more desirable game fish species.

Hardhead are apparently unable to recolonize areas they have been extirpated from and among the suggested measures to conserve the species are the artificial restocking of suitable areas where it was formerly found. It has been also suggested that managing water flows to suit this species, and other native species, and disadvantage non native species should be researched and put into practice together with measures to mitigate impoundments and canalisation of the streams used by hardheads.
