= Charles Pickering (naturalist) =

American anthropologist, botanist, and physician (1805–1878)

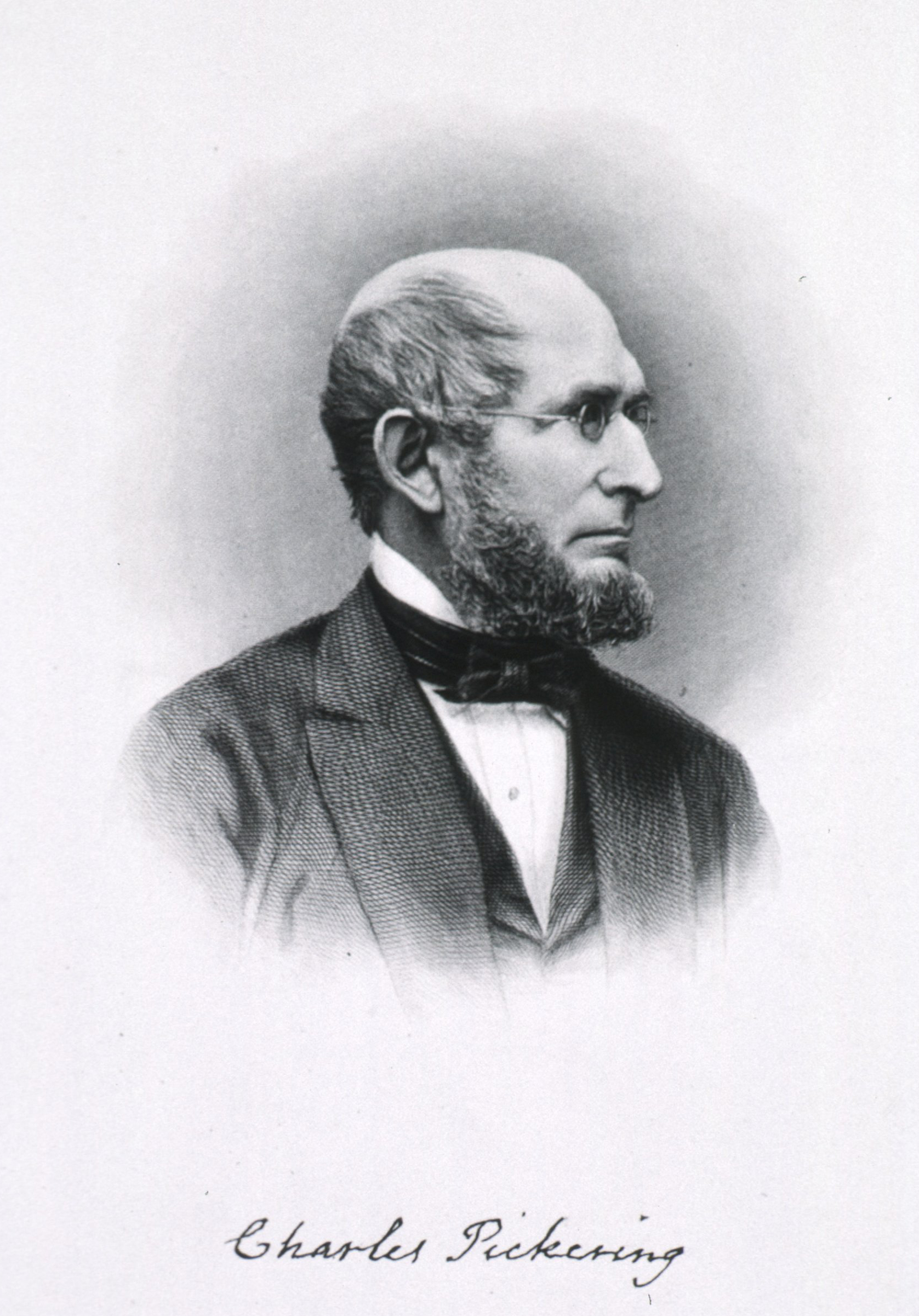
- Born: November 10, 1805; Susquehanna Depot, Pennsylvania
- Died: March 17, 1878 (aged 72); Boston, Massachusetts
- Resting place: Mount Auburn Cemetery; 42.3720400572368°N 71.1403224970515°W
- Education: Harvard College, Harvard University, Harvard Medical School
- Scientific career
- Fields: anthropology, botany, medicine, scientific racism

Charles Pickering (November 10, 1805 – March 17, 1878) was an American naturalist, curator, writer, and medical doctor.

== Biography ==
Born on Starucca Creek, Upper Susquehanna, Pennsylvania, the grandson of Colonel Timothy Pickering, after the death of his father he was raised in the house of his grandfather in Wenham, Massachusetts. Despite his part in the student rebellion of 1823, he received a medical degree from Harvard University in 1826. A practicing medical doctor in Philadelphia, he became active as librarian and curator at the city's Academy of Natural Sciences.

Pickering went with the United States Exploring Expedition of 1838–1842 as one of its naturalists. Charles Wilkes, the expedition's commander, named Pickering Passage in honor of Charles Pickering. His journal of the Expedition was a major influence on Wilkes' Narrative of the United States Exploring Expedition.

From 1842 to 1843, Pickering curated the collection from the Wilkes Expedition, which was housed at the Patent Office in Washington DC, these collections were to form the foundation of the Smithsonian Institution.

Pickering was a polygenist; he believed that different races had been created separately. In 1843, he traveled to the Middle East, Zanzibar and India to continue his research for his book on the Races of Man. In 1848, Pickering published Races of Man and Their Geographical Distribution, which enumerated eleven races.

He later moved to Boston, where he resumed his medical practice, and eventually died on March 17, 1878.

He was married to Sarah Stoddard Pickering, who posthumously published his final work. He was an associate of many important figures in America's intellectual landscape, including Asa Gray, Horatio Hale, James Dwight Dana and Louis Agassiz.

A subspecies of North American garter snake, Thamnophis sirtalis pickeringii, is named in his honor.

== Books ==
- Pickering, Charles (1863). The geographical distribution of animals and plants (United States exploring expedition, 1838-1842, under the command of Charles Wilkes). Trübner and Company.
- Races of Man and Their Geographical Distribution (1848)
- Geographical Distribution of Animals and Plants (1854)
- Geographical Distribution of Plants (1861)
- Chronological History of Plants: Man's Record of His Own Existence Illustrated through Their Names, Uses, and Companionship (1879)

== See also ==
- European and American voyages of scientific exploration
