= Glenns Ferry Formation =

Geologic formation in Idaho, United States

The Glenns Ferry Formation is a Pliocene stratigraphic unit in the western United States. Outcrops of the formation in Hagerman Fossil Beds National Monument preserve the remains of seven fish species, five of which are extinct. These include the teleosteans Mylopharodon hagermanensis, Sigmopharyngodon idahoensis, and Ptychocheilus oregonensis, Ameirurus vespertinus, and the sunfish Archoplites taylori. A nearly complete skull of the catfish Ameirurus vespertinus was recovered in 2001 from the wall of the Smithsonian Horse Quarry. The formation was deposited by Lake Idaho.

== Sources ==
- Hunt, ReBecca K., Vincent L. Santucci and Jason Kenworthy. 2006. "A preliminary inventory of fossil fish from National Park Service units." in S.G. Lucas, J.A. Spielmann, P.M. Hester, J.P. Kenworthy, and V.L. Santucci (ed.s), Fossils from Federal Lands. New Mexico Museum of Natural History and Science Bulletin 34, pp. 63–69.
