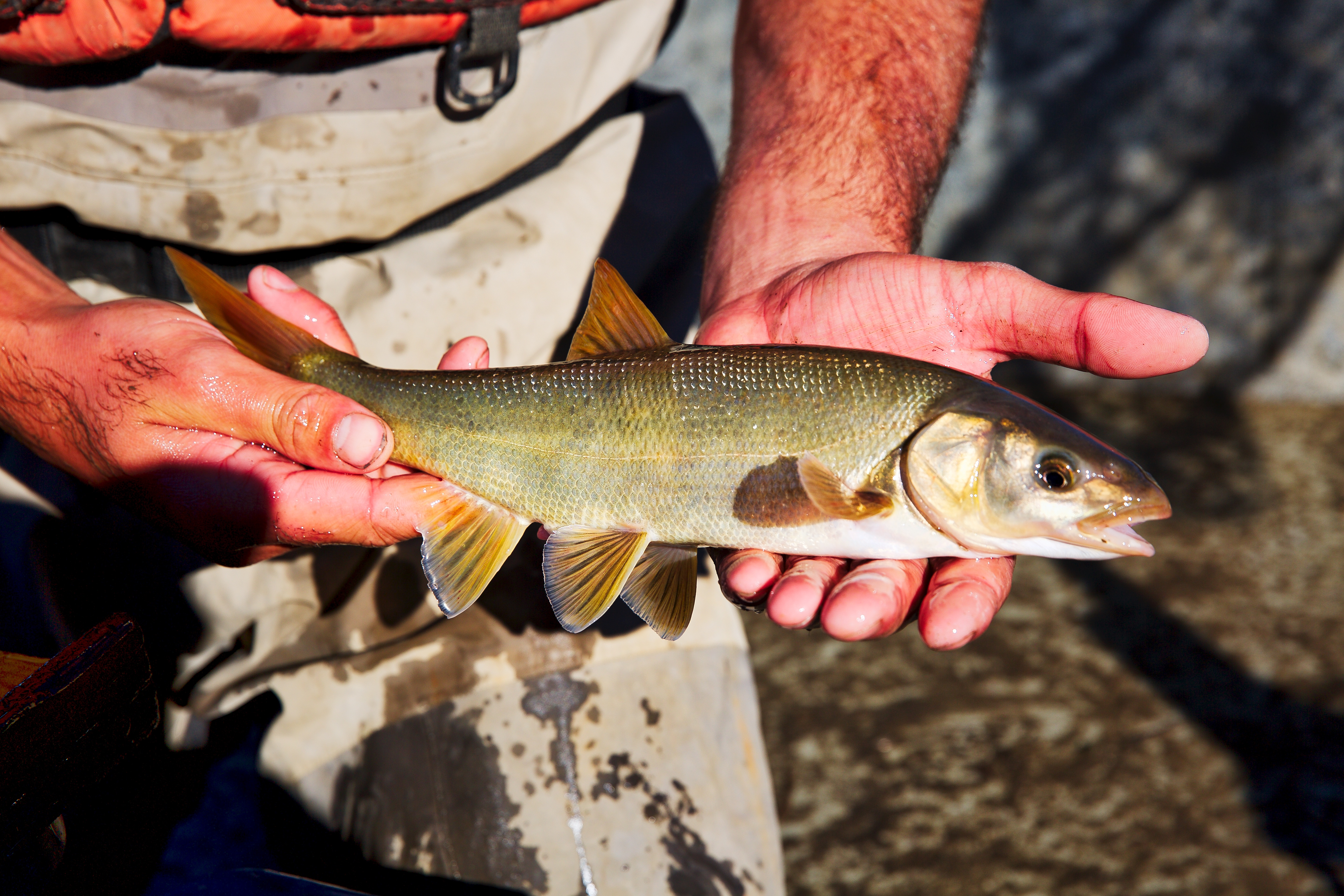
- Mylopharodon conocephalus

Scientific classification
- Kingdom: Animalia
- Phylum: Chordata
- Class: Actinopterygii
- Order: Cypriniformes
- Family: Leuciscidae
- Subfamily: Laviniinae; Bleeker, 1863

Genera
- See text

= Laviniinae =

Laviniinae Temporal range: Late Eocene/Early Oligocene-recent

Subfamily of fishes

Laviniinae is a subfamily of freshwater ray-finned fishes belonging to the family Leuciscidae, the family which includes the daces, chubs, Eurasian minnows and related fishes. Members of this subfamily are known as western chubs or the western clade (WC) of minnows. As the name suggests, most members of this clade are found in western North America aside from Chrosomus, which is found in eastern North America.

One of the largest North American cypriniforms and the largest member of Leuciscidae, the Colorado pikeminnow (Ptychocheilus lucius), belongs to this subfamily.

Fossil remains of a large minnow presumably related to Ptychocheilus have been recovered from the Late Eocene or Early Oligocene-aged deposits of the Cypress Hills Formation in Saskatchewan.

== Genera ==
Laviniinae contains the following genera:

- Chrosomus Rafinesque, 1820 (redbelly daces)
- Eremichthys Hubbs & R. R. Miller, 1948 (desert dace)
- †Evarra Woolman, 1894 (Mexican daces)
- Gila Baird & Girard, 1853 (western chubs)
- Hesperoleucus Snyder, 1913 (California roach)
- Lavinia Girard, 1854 (hitch)
- Mylopharodon Ayres, 1855 (hardheads)
- Orthodon Girard, 1856 (Sacramento blackfish)
- Ptychocheilus Agassiz, 1855 (pikeminnows)
- Relictus Hubbs & R. R. Miller, 1972 (relict dace)
- Siphateles Cope, 1883
