= Chub =

Kind of Fish

Chub is a common fish name. It pertains to any one of a number of ray-finned fish in several families and general. In the UK, the term chub usually refers to the species Squalius cephalus.

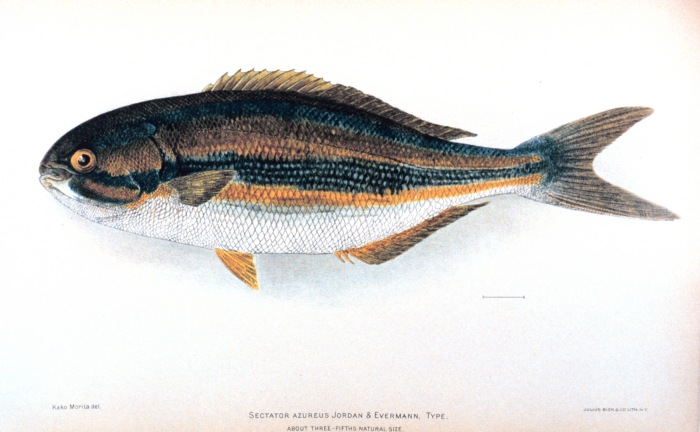
Kyphosinae

== In family Cyprinidae ==
- Bigeye chub, genus Hybopsis
- Creek chub, genus Semotilus
- Fallfish, genus Semotilus
- European chub, genus Squalius
- Flame chub, Hemitremia flammea (a monotypic genus)
- Flathead chub, genus Platygobio
- Hornyhead chub, genus Nocomis
- Lake chub, genus Couesius
- Least chub, Iotichthys phlegethontis (a monotypic genus)
- Leatherside chub, Snyderichthys copei (a monotypic genus)
- Oregon chub, genus Oregonichthys
- Ponto-Caspian chub, genus Petroleuciscus
- Slender chub, genus Erimystax
- Western chub, genus Gila (including Siphateles)
- Genus Algansea
- Genus Notropis (eastern shiners) are also sometimes called "chubs"

== In other families ==
- Sea chub, the family Kyphosidae
- Coregonus artedi, commonly known as cisco, lake herring, chub
- Coregonus hoyi, commonly known as bloater, and sometimes thought to be a type of Coregonus artedi
- Tautog or black porgy
- Bermuda chub, Centrolophus niger
- Chub mackerel

== See also ==
- Sea chub
- Chub (disambiguation)
