= List of endangered fishes =

- Extinct in the wild (EW): 11 species
- Critically endangered (CR): 906 species
- Endangered (EN): 1,533 species
- Vulnerable (VU): 1,740 species
- Near threatened (NT, LR/cd): 1,042 species
- Least concern (LC): 18,621 species
- Data deficient (DD): 5,492 species
Fish species (IUCN, 2025-2)
- 29,447 extant species have been evaluated
- 23,955 of those are fully assessed (Note: excludes data deficient evaluations.)
- 19,663 are not threatened at present
- 4,292 to 9,784 are threatened (Note: Threatened comprises CR, EN and VU. Upper estimate additionally includes DD.)
- 113 to 268 are extinct or extinct in the wild:
  - 102 extinct (EX) species (Note: Chart omits extinct (EX) species)
  - 11 extinct in the wild (EW)
  - 147 possibly extinct [CR(PE)]
  - 8 possibly extinct in the wild [CR(PEW)]

Endangered (EN) species are considered to be facing a very high risk of extinction in the wild.

In September 2016, the International Union for Conservation of Nature (IUCN) listed 643 endangered fish species. Of all evaluated fish species, 4.2% are listed as endangered. The IUCN also lists ten fish subspecies as endangered.

Of the subpopulations of fishes evaluated by the IUCN, 24 species subpopulations have been assessed as endangered.

For a species to be considered endangered by the IUCN it must meet certain quantitative criteria which are designed to classify taxa facing "a very high risk of extinction". An even higher risk is faced by critically endangered species, which meet the quantitative criteria for endangered species. Critically endangered fishes are listed separately. There are 1098 fish species which are endangered or critically endangered.

Additionally 3191 fish species (21% of those evaluated) are listed as data deficient, meaning there is insufficient information for a full assessment of conservation status. As these species typically have small distributions and/or populations, they are intrinsically likely to be threatened, according to the IUCN. While the category of data deficient indicates that no assessment of extinction risk has been made for the taxa, the IUCN notes that it may be appropriate to give them "the same degree of attention as threatened taxa, at least until their status can be assessed".

This is a complete list of endangered fish species and subspecies evaluated by the IUCN. Species and subspecies which have endangered subpopulations (or stocks) are indicated.

== Cartilaginous fishes ==
Chondrichthyes includes sharks, rays, skates, and saw-fish. There are 124 cartilaginous fishes classified as endangered by the IUCN.

=== Prickly sharks ===
- Bramble shark (Echinorhinus brucus)

=== Carpet sharks ===
- Hasselt's bambooshark (Chiloscyllium hasselti)
- Pacific nurse shark (Ginglymostoma unami)
- Whale shark (Rhincodon typus)
- Zebra shark (Stegostoma tigrinum)

=== Ground sharks ===
Species

- Blacknose shark (Carcharhinus acronotus)
- Grey reef shark (Carcharhinus amblyrhynchos)
- Whitecheek shark (Carcharhinus dussumieri)
- Smoothtooth blacktip shark (Carcharhinus leiodon)
- Dusky shark (Carcharhinus obscurus)
- Caribbean reef shark (Carcharhinus perezi)
- Sandbar shark (Carcharhinus plumbeus)
- Night shark (Carcharhinus signatus)
- Winghead shark (Eusphyrna blochii)
- Blackspotted catshark (Halaelurus buergeri)
- Puffadder shyshark (Haploblepharus edwardsii)
- Blackspotted catshark (Halaelurus buergeri)
- Indonesian houndshark (Hemitriakis indroyonoi)
- Sharpfin houndshark (Hemitriakis acutipinna)
- Japanese topeshark (Hemitriakis japanica)
- Honeycomb Izak (Holohalaelurus favus)
- African spotted catshark (Holohalaelurus punctuatus)
- Broadfin shark (Lamiopsis temminckii)
- Borneo broadfin shark (Lamiopsis tephrodes)
- Spotless smoothhound (Mustelus griseus)
- Smalleye smoothhound (Mustelus higmani)
- Starspotted smoothhound (Mustelus manazo)
- Venezuelan dwarf smoothhound (Mustelus minicanis)
- Common smoothhound (Mustelus mustelus)
- Whitenose shark (Nasolamia velox)
- Sharptooth lemon shark (Negaprion acutidens)
- Straight-tooth weasel shark (Paragaleus tengi)
- Atlantic weasel shark (Paragaleus pectoralis)
- Bonnethead (Sphyrna tiburo)
- Banded houndshark (Triakis scyllium)

Subpopulations

- Sicklefin lemon shark (Negaprion acutidens) (1 subpopulation)
- Scalloped hammerhead (Sphyrna lewini) (3 subpopulations)

=== Mackerel sharks ===
Species

- Shortfin mako (Isurus oxyrinchus)
- Longfin mako (Isurus paucus)
- Pelagic thresher (Alopias pelagicus)
- Basking shark (Cetorhinus maximus)
- Smalltooth sand tiger (Odontaspis ferox)

Subpopulations

- Basking shark (Cetorhinus maximus) (2 subpopulations)
- Porbeagle (Lamna nasus) (1 subpopulation)

=== Dogfishes ===
- Gulper shark (Centrophorus granulosus)
- Dumb gulper shark (Centrophorus harrissoni)
- Blackfin gulper shark (Centrophorus isodon)
- African gulper shark (Centrophorus lesliei)
- Longfin gulper shark (Centrophorus longipinnis)
- Leafscale gulper shark (Centrophorus squamosus)
- Mosaic gulper shark (Centrophorus tessellatus)
- Little gulper shark (Centrophorus uyato)
- Angular roughshark (Oxynotus centrina)
- Japanese shortnose spurdog (Squalus brevirostris)
- Greeneye spurdog (Squalus chloroculus)
- Taiwan spurdog (Squalus formosus)
- Japanese spurdog (Squalus japonicus)
- Shortspine spurdog (Squalus mitsukurii)

=== Angel sharks ===
Species

- Taiwan angelshark (Squatina formosa)
- Angular angel shark (Squatina guggenheim)
- Squatina punctata

=== Skates ===
- Eyespot skate (Atlantoraja cyclophora)
- La Plata skate (Atlantoraja platana)
- Graytail skate (Bathyraja griseocauda)
- Mottled skate (Beringraja pulchra)
- Grey skate (Dipturus canutus)
- Yellownose skate (Dipturus chilensis)
- Maugean skate (Dipturus maugeanus)
- Norwegian skate (Dipturus nidarosiensis)
- Roughskin skate (Dipturus trachydermus)
- Sandy skate (Leucoraja circularis)
- Winter skate (Leucoraja ocellata)
- Twineye skate (Raja ocellifera)
- Rough skate (Raja radula)
- Undulate skate (Raja undulata)
- Bottlenose skate (Rostroraja alba)

=== Rays ===
- Longhead eagle ray (Aetobatus flagellum)
- Whitespotted eagle ray (Aetobatus narinari)
- Ocellate eagle ray (Aetobatus ocellatus)
- Ornate eagle ray (Aetomylaeus vespertilio)
- Mottled eagle ray (Aetomylaeus maculatus)
- Giant manta ray (Mobula birostris)
- Longhorned pygmy devil ray (Mobula eregoodoo)
- Atlantic devil ray (Mobula hypostoma)
- Shortfin devil ray (Mobula kuhlii)
- Spinetail devil ray (Mobula mobular)
- Chilean devil ray (Mobula tarapacana)
- Bentfin devil ray (Mobula thurstoni)
- Giant freshwater whipray (Urogymnus polylepis)
- White-edge freshwater whipray (Fluvitrygon signifer)
- Coach whipray (Himantura uarnak)
- Honeycomb whipray (Himantura undulata)
- Bleeker's whipray (Pateobatis bleekeri)
- Sharpnose whipray (Maculabatus macrura)
- Marbled whipray (Fluvitrygon oxyrhynchus)
- Round whipray (Maculabatus pastinacoides)
- Roughback whipray (Fluvitrygon kittapongi)
- Whitespotted whipray (Maculabatis gerrardi)
- Tubemouth whipray (Urogymnus lobistoma)
- Whitenose whipray (Himantura uarnacoides)
- Javan whipray (Brevitrygon javaensis)
- Chinese stingray (Hemitrygon sinensis)
- Honeycomb whipray (Himantura undulata)
- Narrow cowtail ray (Pastinachus gracilicaudus)
- Roughnose cowtail ray (Pastinachus solocirostris)
- Javanese cownose ray (Rhinoptera javanica)
- Oman cownose ray (Rhinoptera jayakari)
- Mekong stingray (Hemitrygon laosensis)
- Seret's butterfly ray (Gymnura sereti)
- Spiny butterfly ray (Gymnura altaveri)
- Zonetail butterfly ray (Gymnura zonura)
- Groovebelly stingray (Dasyatis hypostigma)
- Atlantic chupare (Styracura schmardae)
- Coastal stingaree (Urolophus orarius)
- Raya Amazonica (Potamotrygon tigrina)
- Indian sharpnose ray (Telatrygon crozieri)
- Venezuela round stingray (Urotrygon venezuelae)
- Large-eye stingray (Hypanus marinae)

=== Sawfish and guitarfish ===
- Greyspot guitarfish (Acroteriobatus leucospilus)
- Chola guitarfish (Pseudobatos percellens)
- Borneo guitarfish (Rhinobatos borneensis)
- Ringstreaked guitarfish (Rhinobatos hynnicephalus)
- Indonesian guitarfish (Rhinobatos penggali)
- Shortnose guitarfish (Zapteryx brevirostris)

=== Torpedo rays ===
- Tonkin numbfish (Narcine prodorsalis)
- Chinese fanray (Platyrhina sinensis)
- Aden torpedo (Torpedo adenensis)
- Rosette torpedo (Torpedo bauchotae)
- West African torpedo (Torpedo mackayana)
- Leopard torpedo (Torpedo panthera)

=== Rays and skates ===
- Longheaded eagle ray (Aetobatus flagellum)
- Mottled eagle ray (Aetomylaeus maculatus)
- Ornate eagle ray (Aetomylaeus vespertilio)
- Knifetooth sawfish (Anoxypristis cuspidata)
- Spotback skate (Atlantoraja castelnaui)
- Graytail skate (Bathyraja griseocauda)
- Mekong freshwater stingray (Dasyatis laosensis)
- Daisy stingray (Dasyatis margarita)
- Grey skate (Dipturus canutus)
- Barndoor skate (Dipturus laevis)
- Blackchin guitarfish (Glaucostegus cemiculus)
- Roughback whipray (Himantura kittipongi)
- Marbled whipray (Himantura oxyrhyncha)
- Giant freshwater stingray (Himantura polylepis)
- White-edge freshwater whipray (Himantura signifer)
- Sandy ray (leucoraja circularis)
- Winter skate (Leucoraja ocellata)
- Malacoraja senta
- Devil fish (Mobula mobular)
- Roughnose stingray (Pastinachus solocirostris)
- Tiger river stingray (Potamotrygon tigrina)
- Dwarf sawfish (Pristis clavata)
- Rough ray (Raja radula)
- Undulate ray (Raja undulata)
- Common guitarfish (Rhinobatos rhinobatos)
- Brazilian cownose ray (Rhinoptera brasiliensis)
- African wedgefish (Rhynchobatus luebberti)
- Bottlenose skate (Rostroraja alba)
- Pincushion ray (Urogymnus ukpam)
- Coastal stingaree (Urolophus orarius)
- Maugean skate (Zearaja maugeana)

=== Squaliformes ===
Species

- Dumb gulper shark (Centrophorus harrissoni)
- Japanese shortnose spurdog (Squalus brevirostris)
- Japanese spurdog (Squalus japonicus)
- Shortspine spurdog (Squalus mitsukurii)

Subpopulations

- Spiny dogfish (Squalus acanthias) (2 subpopulations)

== Lampreys ==
- Greek lamprey (Caspiomyzon hellenicus)
- Lake lamprey (Entosphenus macrostoma)
- Turkish brook lamprey (Lampetra lanceolata)
- Australian brook lamprey (Mordacia praecox)

== Ray-finned fishes ==
There are 592 species, ten subspecies, and three subpopulations of ray-finned fish assessed as endangered.

=== Salmoniformes ===
Species

- Pollan (Coregonus pollan)
- Schelly (Coregonus stigmaticus)
- Coregonus vandesius
- Huchen (Hucho hucho)
- Gila trout (Oncorhynchus gilae)
- Satsukimasu salmon (Oncorhynchus ishikawai)
- Salmo aphelios
- Ohrid trout (Salmo letnica)
- Salmo lumi
- Zeta trout (Salmo taleri)
- Adriatic salmon (Salmo obtusirostris)
- Prespa trout (Salmo peristericus)
- Salvelinus japonicus
- Esei Lake char (Salvelinus tolmachoffi)

Subpopulations

- Sockeye salmon (Oncorhynchus nerka) (12 subpopulations)

=== Silversides ===
- Bedotia longianalis
- Bedotia madagascariensis
- Slender silverside (Chirostoma attenuatum)
- Blacknose silverside (Chirostoma promelas)
- Colpichthys hubbsi
- Murray hardyhead (Craterocephalus fluviatilis)
- Boeseman's rainbowfish (Melanotaenia boesemani)
- Slender rainbowfish (Melanotaenia gracilis)
- Fly River rainbowfish (Melanotaenia sexlineata)
- Golden silverside (Menidia colei)
- Key silverside (Menidia conchorum)
- Neostethus thessa
- La Preciosa silverside (Poblana letholepis)
- Quechulac silverside (Poblana squamata)
- Honey blue-eye (Pseudomugil mellis)
- Rheocles wrightae
- Telmatherina bonti
- Teramulus waterloti

=== Toothcarps ===
There are 65 species and nine subspecies of toothcarp assessed as endangered.

==== Pupfish ====
Species

- Dead Sea toothcarp (Aphaniops richardsoni)
- Sureyan killifish (Aphanius burduricus)
- Spanish toothcarp (Aphanius iberus)
- Lake Afdera killifish (Aphanius stiassnyae)
- Burdur toothcarp (Aphanius sureyanus)
- White River springfish (Crenichthys baileyi)
- Checkered pupfish (Cualac tessellatus)
- Blackfin pupfish (Cyprinodon beltrani)
- Comanche Springs pupfish (Cyprinodon elegans)
- Sonoyta pupfish (Cyprinodon eremus)
- Carbonera pupfish (Cyprinodon fontinalis)
- Largescale pupfish (Cyprinodon macrolepis)
- Mezquital pupfish (Cyprinodon meeki)
- Owens pupfish (Cyprinodon radiosus)
- Death Valley pupfish (Cyprinodon salinus)
- Cachorrito boxeador (Cyprinodon simus)
- White Sands pupfish (Cyprinodon tularosa)
- Orestias gymnota
- Orestias laucaensis
- Orestias parinacotensis
- Orestias polonorum

==== Nothobranchiids ====
Species

- Aphyosemion alpha
- Red-finned killi (Aphyosemion amoenum)
- Bamileke killi (Aphyosemion bamilekorum)
- Aphyosemion bualanum
- Goby killi (Aphyosemion franzwerneri)
- Aphyosemion fulgens
- Aphyosemion lugens
- Aphyosemion passaroi
- Aphyosemion poliaki
- Aphyosemion tirbaki
- Aphyosemion volcanum
- Epiplatys biafranus
- Epiplatys etzeli
- Epiplatys lokoensis
- Epiplatys njalaensis
- Epiplatys roloffi
- Amiet's lyretail (Fundulopanchax amieti)
- Fundulopanchax arnoldi
- Cinnamon killi (Fundulopanchax cinnamomeus)
- Kribi killi (Fundulopanchax fallax)
- Marbled lyretail (Fundulopanchax marmoratus)
- Fundulopanchax oeseri
- Fundulopanchax rubrolabialis
- Jeanpol's killi (Nimbapanchax jeanpoli)
- Nothobranchius polli
- Nothobranchius rosenstocki
- Nothobranchius symoensi
- Pronothobranchius kiyawensis
- Berthold's killi (Scriptaphyosemion bertholdi)
- Bruening's killi (Scriptaphyosemion brueningi)

Subspecies

- Aphyosemion celiae celiae
- Epiplatys chaperi schreiberi
- Epiplatys fasciolatus tototaensis
- Epiplatys fasciolatus zimiensis
- Epiplatys olbrechtsi azureus
- Epiplatys olbrechtsi dauresi
- Epiplatys olbrechtsi puetzi
- Mamfe killi (Fundulopanchax gardneri mamfensis)

==== Poeciliids ====
- Pecos gambusia (Gambusia nobilis)
- Flame lampeye (Plataplochilus chalcopyrus)
- Terver's lampeye (Plataplochilus terveri)
- Headwater livebearer (Poeciliopsis monacha)
- Hummingbird lampeye (Poropanchax myersi)
- Northern platyfish (Xiphophorus gordoni)

==== Other toothcarp species ====
- Striped goodeid (Ataeniobius toweri)
- Austrofundulus myersi
- Barrens topminnow (Fundulus julisia)
- Yucatan killifish (Fundulus persimilis)
- Mexican rivulus (Millerichthys robustus)
- Pachypanchax patriciae
- Pachypanchax sakaramyi
- Pachypanchax sparksorum
- Pachypanchax varatraza
- Popoyote (Profundulus hildebrandi)
- Relict splitfin (Xenoophorus captivus)

=== Cypriniformes ===
Cypriniformes includes carps, minnows, loaches and relatives. There are 245 species in the order Cypriniformes assessed as endangered.

==== Ellopostomatids ====
- Ellopostoma mystax

==== Hillstream loaches ====
- Barbatula samantica
- Barbatula tschaiyssuensis
- Anamalai loach (Homaloptera montana)
- Santhampara loach (Homaloptera santhamparaiensis)
- Longischistura striatus
- Nemacheilus jordanicus
- Nemacheilus pantheroides
- Nemacheilus petrubanarescui
- Nemacheilus pulchellus
- Nemacheilus sp.
- Shimoga loach (Nemachilichthys shimogensis)
- Burdur loach (Oxynoemacheilus anatolicus)
- Van loach (Oxynoemacheilus ercisianus)
- Orontes sportive loach (Oxynoemacheilus hamwii)
- Isiki loach (Oxynoemacheilus mesudae)
- Damascus loach (Oxynoemacheilus panthera)
- Mancilik dwarf loach (Oxynoemacheilus paucilepis)
- Cilician loach (Oxynoemacheilus seyhanicola)
- Banded mountain zipper loach (Paracanthocobitis urophthalma)
- Schistura bairdi
- Schistura bolavenensis
- Schistura kangjupkhulensis
- Schistura minutus
- Nagodi loach (Schistura nagodiensis)
- Schistura nudidorsum
- Mini dragon loach (Schistura pridii)
- Schistura quasimodo
- Schistura reticulata
- Schistura sijuensis
- Schistura thanho
- Schistura tigrinum
- Sewellia marmorata
- Sewellia patella
- Sewellia pterolineata
- Periyar loach (Travancoria elongata)
- Travancore loach (Travancoria jonesi)
- Yunnanilus nigromaculatus

=== True loaches ===
- Zebra loach (Botia striata)
- Cobitis arachthosensis
- Beysehir spined loach (Cobitis battalgili)
- Great Beysehir spined loach (Cobitis bilseli)
- Cobitis calderoni
- Ceyhan spined loach (Cobitis evreni)
- Cobitis hellenica
- Orontes spined loach (Cobitis levantina)
- Phrygian spined loach (Cobitis phrygica)
- Brown spined loach (Cobitis puncticulata)
- Cobitis trichonica
- Central Anatolian spined loach (Cobitis turcica)
- Cobitis vettonica
- Lepidocephalichthys arunachalensis
- Lepidocephalichthys jonklaasi
- Paralepidocephalus yui
- Dwarf loach (Yasuhikotakia sidthimunki)

=== Cyprinids ===
- Achondrostoma occidentale
- Achondrostoma salmantinum
- Bakır Shemaya (Alburnus attalus)
- Antalya bleak (Alburnus baliki)
- Manyas shemaya (Alburnus carinatus)
- Mandras bleak (Alburnus mandrensis)
- Crimea shemaya (Alburnus mentoides)
- Syrian spotted bleak (Alburnus qalilus)
- Pontian shemaya (Alburnus sarmaticus)
- Alburnus schischkovi
- Alburnus volviticus
- Silvery white fish (Anabarilius alburnops)
- Big white fish (Anabarilius polylepis)
- Anaecypris hispanica
- Dalmatian barbelgudgeon (Aulopyge huegelii)
- Bala shark (Balantiocheilos melanopterus)
- Barbus acuticeps
- Barbus aliciae
- Berg-breede river whitefish (Barbus andrewi)
- Barbus bawkuensis
- Barbus bourdariei
- Brook barbel (Barbus caninus)
- Barbus claudinae
- Barbus huguenyi
- Barbus lauzannei
- Barbus liberiensis
- Barbus nigroluteus
- Barbus quadralineatus
- Sawfin (Barbus serra)
- Barbus stauchi
- Barbus subinensis
- Barbus sylvaticus
- Barbus thysi
- Barbus traorei
- Treur River barb (Barbus treurensis)
- Border barb (Barbus trevelyani)
- Jerdon's baril (Barilius canarensis)
- Orontes scraper (Capoeta barroisi)
- Longsnout scraper (Capoeta mauricii)
- Arabian himri (Carasobarbus apoensis)
- Hadramaut himri (Carasobarbus exulatus)
- Beysehir nase (Chondrostoma beysehirense)
- Tefenni nase (Chondrostoma fahirae)
- Levantine nase (Chondrostoma kinzelbachi)
- Minnow-nase (Chondrostoma phoxinus)
- Italian nase (Chondrostoma soetta)
- Blackside dace (Chrosomus cumberlandensis)
- Laurel dace (Chrosomus saylori)
- Anatolian golden barb (Crossocheilus klatti)
- Periyar latia (Crossocheilus periyarensis)
- Blue shiner (Cyprinella caerulea)
- Plateau shiner (Cyprinella lepida)
- Conchos shiner (Cyprinella panarcys)
- Cuatro Cienegas shiner (Cyprinella xanthicara)
- Cyprinus chilia
- Inle carp (Cyprinus intha)
- Danio erythromicron
- Aruli barb (Dawkinsia arulius)
- Exclamation barb (Dawkinsia exclamatio)
- Tambraparini barb (Dawkinsia tambraparniei)
- Devario auropurpureus
- Devario horai
- Nilgiri danio (Devario neilgherriensis)
- Barred danio (Devario pathirana)
- Devil's River minnow (Dionda diaboli)
- Channa barb (Eechathalakenda ophicephalus)
- Slender chub (Erimystax cahni)
- Folifer yunnanensis
- Tawi Atair garra (Garra dunsirei)
- Dear sea garra (Garra ghorensis)
- Cardamon garra (Garra hughi)
- Kalakad stone carp (Garra kalakadensis)
- Smooth Hadramaut garra (Garra lautior)
- Spiny Hadramaut garra (Garra mamshuqa)
- Periyar garra (Garra surendranathanii)
- Humpback chub (Gila cypha)
- Gila chub (Gila intermedia)
- Virgin river chub (Gila seminuda)
- Eber gudgeon (Gobio intermedius)
- Işıklı gudgeon (Gobio maeandricus)
- Gobio skadarensis
- Gymnostomus horai
- Tuz golden barb (Hemigrammocapoeta kemali)
- Lipped algae eater (Horalabiosa joshuai)
- Rio Grande silvery minnow (Hybognathus amarus)
- Curmuca barb (Hypselobarbus curmuca)
- Nilgiris barb (Hypselobarbus dubius)
- Korhi barb (Hypselobarbus micropogon)
- Hump backed mahseer (Hypselobarbus mussullah)
- Periyar barb (Hypselobarbus periyarensis)
- Least chub (Iotichthys phlegethontis)
- Labeo alluaudi
- Green labeo (Labeo fisheri)
- Tana labeo (Labeo mesops)
- Labeo potail
- Labeobarbus ethiopicus
- Labeobarbus macrophtalmus
- Labeobarbus mbami
- Labeobarbus mungoensis
- Labeobarbus roylii
- Flying minnow (Laubuca caeruleostigmata)
- Little Colorado spinedace (Lepidomeda vittata)
- Peninsular Hill trout (Lepidopygopsis typus)
- Luciobarbus graecus
- Jordan barbel (Luciobarbus longiceps)
- Luciocyprinus striolatus
- Arkansas river speckled chub (Macrhybopsis tetranema)
- Spikedace (Meda fulgida)
- Red dwarf rasbora (Microrasbora rubescens)
- Palezone shiner (Notropis albizonatus)
- Cahaba shiner (Notropis cahabae)
- Cape Fear shiner (Notropis mekistocholas)
- Bluntnose shiner (Notropis simus)
- Onychostoma alticorpus
- Lake salmon (Opsaridium microlepis)
- Long finned barb (Osteochilus longidorsalis)
- Parachondrostoma turiense
- Parapsilorhynchus elongatus
- Pelasgus prespensis
- Pethia manipurensis
- Chennai sawfin barb (Pethia sharmai)
- Phoxinellus alepidotus
- Phoxinellus anatolicus
- Phoxinus strandjae
- Phoxinus strymonicus
- Poropuntius bolovenensis
- Poropuntius consternans
- Yellow tail brook barb (Poropuntius deauratus)
- Poropuntius lobocheiloides
- Poropuntius solitus
- Jullien's golden carp (Probarbus jullieni)
- Thicklipped barb (Probarbus labeamajor)
- Eastern Cape redfin (Pseudobarbus afer)
- Smallscale redfin (Pseudobarbus asper)
- Berg River redfin (Pseudobarbus burgi)
- Fiery redfin (Pseudobarbus phlegethon)
- Maluti redfin (Pseudobarbus quathlambae)
- Pamphylian spring minnow (Pseudophoxinus alii)
- Giant spring minnow (Pseudophoxinus anatolicus)
- Burdur spring minnow (Pseudophoxinus burduricus)
- Fat spring minnow (Pseudophoxinus crassus)
- Drusian spring minnow (Pseudophoxinus drusensis)
- Pseudophoxinus egridiri
- Lycian spring minnow (Pseudophoxinus evliyae)
- Pisidian spring minnow (Pseudophoxinus fahrettini)
- Euphrates spring minnow (Pseudophoxinus firati)
- Hittitic spring minnow (Pseudophoxinus hittitorum)
- Apamean spring minnow (Pseudophoxinus maeandri)
- Pseudophoxinus punicus
- Cauvery barb (Puntius cauveriensis)
- Puntius crescentus
- Dharna barb (Puntius fraseri)
- Wilpita rasbora (Rasbora wilpita)
- Romanogobio benacensis
- Rutilus meidingeri
- Rutilus ylikiensis
- Miss Kerala look alike (Sahyadria chalakkudiensis)
- Red line torpedo barb (Sahyadria denisonii)
- Burmese rammy nose (Sawbwa resplendens)
- Elmalı rudd (Scardinius elmaliensis)
- Nukta (Schismatorhynchos nukta)
- Schizothorax lepidothorax
- Sinocyclocheilus tingi
- Chocolate chub (Squalius carinus)
- Squalius castellanus
- Squalius keadicus
- Striped chub (Squalius kosswigi)
- Squalius lucumonis
- Squalius malacitanus
- Squalius microlepis
- Squalius moreoticus
- Squalius tenellus
- Squalius torgalensis
- Asoka barb (Systomus asoka)
- Systomus martenstyni
- Paskóviza (Telestes beoticus)
- Telestes croaticus
- Telestes sp.
- Sandkhol carp (Thynnichthys sandkhol)
- Black mahseer (Tor khudree)
- Dwarf mahseer (Tor kulkarnii)
- Malabar mahseer (Tor malabaricus)
- Putitor mahseer (Tor putitora)

=== Psilorhynchids ===
- Psilorhynchus microphthalmus

=== Suckers ===
- Santa Ana sucker (Catostomus santaanae)
- Warner sucker (Catostomus warnerensis)
- Shortnose sucker (Chasmistes brevirostris)
- Cui-ui (Chasmistes cujus)
- Lost River sucker (Deltistes luxatus)
- Copper redhorse (Moxostoma hubbsi)
- Robust redhorse (Moxostoma robustum)

=== Osmeriformes ===
Includes freshwater smelts and allies.

Species

- Galaxias divergens
- Galaxias (Galaxias neocaledonicus)
- Shortjaw kokopu (Galaxias postvectis)
- Brown mudfish (Neochanna apoda)
- Black mudfish (Neochanna diversus)

Subspecies

- Plecoglossus altivelis ryukyuensis

=== Catfishes ===
- Amblyceps arunchalensis
- Amphilius caudosignatus
- Amphilius korupi
- Amphilius lamani
- Ancistrus marcapatae
- Ancistrus tolima
- Ancistrus vericaucanus
- Arius festinus
- Arius uncinatus
- Barnard's rock-catfish (Austroglanis barnardi)
- Sharavati batasio (Batasio sharavatiensis)
- Bullockia maldonadoi
- Chaetostoma changae
- Chaetostoma daidalmatos
- Chaetostoma lepturum
- Chaetostoma loborhynchos
- Chaetostoma palmeri
- Chaetostoma stroumpoulos
- Chiloglanis asymetricaudalis
- Incomati rock catlet (Chiloglanis bifurcus)
- Chrysichthys teugelsi
- Chrysichthys walkeri
- Clariallabes mutsindoziensis
- Wagur (Clarias magur)
- Diplomystes nahuelbutaensis
- Anamalai sucker catfish (Glyptothorax anamalaiensis)
- Glyptothorax davissinghi
- Glyptothorax housei
- Glyptothorax madraspatanus
- Glyptothorax poonaensis
- Imperial white collared yellow catfish (Horabagrus nigricollaris)
- Bagre de yaqui (Ictalurus pricei)
- Imparfinis spurrellii
- Irvineia voltae
- Lepthoplosternum tordilho
- King's bullhead (Liobagrus kingi)
- Liobagrus nigricauda
- New Grenada sea catfish (Notarius bonillai)
- Notoglanidium akiri
- Notoglanidium maculatum
- Notoglanidium thomasi
- Saddled madtom (Noturus fasciatus)
- Orangefin madtom (Noturus gilberti)
- Ouachita madtom (Noturus lachneri)
- Pygmy madtom (Noturus stanauli)
- Caddo madtom (Noturus taylori)
- Oreoglanis heteropogon
- Oreoglanis siamensis
- Zebra oto (Otocinclus cocama)
- Panaqolus albivermis
- Iridescent shark (Pangasianodon hypophthalmus)
- Paramphilius firestonei
- Parauchenoglanis longiceps
- Pimelodella kronei
- Mexican blindcat (Prietella phreatophila)
- Malabar patashi (Pseudeutropius mitchelli)
- Pseudoplatystoma magdaleniatum
- Pterocryptis barakensis
- Pterocryptis inusitata
- Malabar silurus (Pterocryptis wynaadensis)
- Silonia childreni
- Synodontis dorsomaculatus
- Synodontis guttatus
- Synodontis pardalis
- Trichomycterus chiltoni
- Trichomycterus taeniops
- Trichomycterus unicolor
- Trichomycterus weyrauchi

=== Perciformes ===
There are 133 species and one subpopulation in the order Perciformes assessed as endangered.

==== Cichlids ====
- Alcolapia alcalicus
- Amphilophus margaritifer
- Benitochromis conjunctus
- Benitochromis finleyi
- Benitochromis nigrodorsalis
- Benitochromis riomuniensis
- Benitochromis ufermanni
- Orange-fringed largemouth (Chetia brevis)
- Chetia mola
- Chromidotilapia linkei
- Cichlasoma gephyrum
- Danakilia franchettii
- Canara pearlspot (Etroplus canarensis)
- Gobiocichla ethelwynnae
- Haplochromis desfontainii
- Haplochromis erythromaculatus
- Haplochromis igneopinnis
- Haplochromis simpsoni
- Haplochromis venator
- Hemichromis cerasogaster
- Curve-bar cichlid (Herichthys labridens)
- Lamprologus tumbanus
- Lethrinops macracanthus
- Lethrinops micrentodon
- Lethrinops microdon
- Lethrinops stridae
- Limbochromis robertsi
- Nanochromis transvestitus
- Lake Magadi tilapia (Oreochromis alcalicus)
- Oreochromis amphimelas
- Oreochromis karongae
- Oreochromis lepidurus
- Oreochromis lidole
- Oreochromis squamipinnis
- Orthochromis kasuluensis
- Orthochromis luongoensis
- Orthochromis mazimeroensis
- Orthochromis mosoensis
- Orthochromis rubrolabialis
- Parananochromis axelrodi
- Parananochromis ornatus
- Paretroplus dambabe
- Paretroplus gymnopreopercularis
- Paretroplus maromandia
- Prognathochromis sp. 'long snout'
- Ptychochromis inornatus
- Ptychochromis sp. 'Green Garaka'
- Lowveld largemouth (Serranochromis meridianus)
- Tilapia kottae
- Tylochromis microdon

==== Percids ====
- Bluemask darter (Etheostoma akatulo)
- Slackwater darter (Etheostoma boschungi)
- Relict darter (Etheostoma chienense)
- Coldwater darter (Etheostoma ditrema)
- Fountain darter (Etheostoma fonticola)
- Yellowcheek darter (Etheostoma moorei)
- Watercress darter (Etheostoma nuchale)
- Rush darter (Etheostoma phytophilum)
- Bayou darter (Etheostoma rubrum)
- Cherokee darter (Etheostoma scotti)
- Cumberland darter (Etheostoma susanae)
- Shawnee darter (Etheostoma tecumsehi)
- Amber darter (Percina antesella)
- Pearl darter (Percina aurora)
- Coal darter (Percina brevicauda)
- Bridled darter (Percina kusha)
- Leopard darter (Percina pantherina)

==== Epinephelids ====
- Hong Kong grouper (Epinephelus akaara)
- Dusky grouper (Epinephelus marginatus)
- Nassau grouper (Epinephelus striatus)
- Island grouper (Mycteroperca fusca)
- Gulf grouper (Mycteroperca jordani)

==== Gobies ====
- Bathygobius burtoni
- Nanogoviós (Economidichthys trichonis)
- Exuma goby (Elacatinus atronasus)
- Cayman cleaner goby (Elacatinus cayman)
- Cayman sponge goby (Elacatinus centralis)
- Jarocho goby (Elacatinus jarocho)
- Plain goby (Gobiosoma homochroma)
- Isthmian goby (Gobiosoma spilotum)
- Thessalogoviós (Knipowitschia thessala)
- Tortonese's goby (Pomatoschistus tortonesei)
- Iyidere goby (Ponticola rizensis)
- Priolepis ascensionis
- Rhinogobius lineatus
- Sicyopterus eudentatus
- Sicyopterus rapa
- Sicyopterus sarasini
- Sibayi goby (Silhouettea sibayi)
- Smilosicyopus sasali
- Stiphodon julieni
- Cayman greenbanded goby (Tigrigobius harveyi)

==== Other Perciformes ====
Species

- Amblycirrhitus earnshawi
- Sacramento perch (Archoplites interruptus)
- Madagascar kob (Argyrosomus hololepidotus)
- Badis tuivaiei
- Betta livida
- Chaetodontoplus vanderloosi
- Humphead wrasse (Cheilinus undulatus)
- Red stumpnose seabream (Chrysoblephus gibbiceps)
- False Bay klipfish (Clinus latipennis)
- Bot River klipfish (Clinus spatulatus)
- Lightning man triplefin (Enneapterygius namarrgon)
- Lonely blenny (Entomacrodus solus)
- Threadfin porgy (Evynnis cardinalis)
- Mardi Gras wrasse (Halichoeres burekae)
- Halichoeres socialis
- Veracruz white hamlet (Hypoplectrus castroaguirrei)
- Kribia leonensis
- Tanganyika lates (Lates angustifrons)
- Albert lates (Lates macrophthalmus)
- Forktail lates (Lates microlepis)
- White steenbras (Lithognathus lithognathus)
- Great northern tilefish (Lopholatilus chamaeleonticeps)
- Paiva's blenny (Lupinoblennius paivai)
- Eastern freshwater cod (Maccullochella ikei)
- Trout cod (Maccullochella macquariensis)
- Macquarie perch (Macquaria australasica)
- Balston's pygmy perch (Nannatherina balstoni)
- Oxleyan pygmy perch (Nannoperca oxleyana)
- Neopomacentrus aquadulcis
- Magdalena blenny (Paraclinus magdalenae)
- Camotillo (Paralabrax albomaculatus)
- Parosphromenus harveyi
- Red steenbras (Petrus rupestris)
- Protogobius (Protogobius attiti)
- Cassava croaker (Pseudotolithus senegalensis)
- Banggai cardinalfish (Pterapogon kauderni)
- Eastern Province rocky (Sandelia bainsii)
- Greenback parrotfish (Scarus trispinosus)
- Springeratus polyporatus
- Terateleotris aspro
- Atlantic bluefin tuna (Thunnus thynnus)
- Typhleotris madagascariensis
- Typhleotris pauliani

Subpopulations

- Swordfish (Xiphias gladius) (1 subpopulation)

=== Osteoglossiformes ===
- Marcusenius meronai
- Victoria stonebasher (Marcusenius victoriae)
- Mormyrus subundulatus
- Asian arowana (Scleropages formosus)
- Stomatorhinus ivindoensis

=== Characiformes ===
- Alestes bouboni
- Alestopetersius nigropterus
- Astyanax daguae
- Brycinus bartoni
- Brycon labiatus
- Creagrutus nigrostigmatus
- Nannocharax altus
- Neolebias axelrodi
- Neolebias kerguennae
- Oligosarcus schindleri
- Parodon alfonsoi
- Pseudocurimata patiae

=== Tetraodontiformes ===
- Canthigaster cyanetron
- Canthigaster rapaensis
- St. Helena sharpnose pufferfish (Canthigaster sanctaehelenae)
- Blaasop beauty (Chelonodon pleurospilus)
- Takifugu plagiocellatus

=== Other ray-finned fishes ===
Species

- Gulf sturgeon (Acipenser desotoi)
- Lake sturgeon (Acipenser fulvescens)
- Bermuda anchovy (Anchoa choerostoma)
- Japanese eel (Anguilla japonica)
- American eel (Anguilla rostrata)
- Gymnotus ardilai
- Cape seahorse (Hippocampus capensis)
- Atlantic halibut (Hippoglossus hippoglossus)
- Southern Kneria (Kneria sp. 'South Africa')
- Saint Lucia mullet (Liza luciae)
- Lucayan cave brotula (Lucifuga lucayana)
- Mastacembelus oatesii
- Senegalese hake (Merluccius senegalensis)
- Luzon River pipefish (Microphis pleurostictus)
- Monopterus fossorius
- Mai-ndombe dwarf sprat (Nannothrissa stewarti)
- Sterlet (Huso ruthenus)
- Ferocious coralbrotula (Ogilbichthys ferocis)
- Blind cave eel (Ophisternon candidum)
- Blind swamp eel (Ophisternon infernale)
- Sharp-jawed buntingi (Oryzias orthognathus)
- Pillaia indica
- Pungitius stenurus
- Reticulated toadfish (Sanopus reticulatus)
- Splendid toadfish (Sanopus splendidus)
- Ascension scorpionfish (Scorpaena ascensionis)
- Melliss's scorpionfish (Scorpaena mellissii)
- Acadian redfish (Sebastes fasciatus)
- Shortspine thornyhead (Sebastolobus alascanus)
- Green sturgeon (Sinosturio medirostris)
- Grandparents clingfish (Tomicodon abuelorum)
- Egg-carrying buntingi (Xenopoecilus oophorus)

Subpopulations

- White sturgeon (Acipenser transmontanus) (1 subpopulation)

== Hagfishes ==
- Myxine paucidens
- Paramyxine taiwanae

== Lobe-finned fishes ==
- Australian lungfish (Neoceratodus forsteri)

== See also ==
- Lists of IUCN Red List endangered species
- List of least concern fishes
- List of near threatened fishes
- List of vulnerable fishes
- List of critically endangered fishes
- List of recently extinct fishes
- List of data deficient fishes
- Sustainable seafood advisory lists and certification
