= Pronothobranchius =

Scientific classification
- Kingdom: Animalia
- Phylum: Chordata
- Class: Actinopterygii
- Order: Cyprinodontiformes
- Family: Nothobranchiidae
- Genus: Pronothobranchius; Radda, 1969

Type species
- Nothobranchius kiyawensis Ahl, 1928

Genus of fishes

Pronothobranchius is a genus of aplocheilid fish native to western Africa.

== Species ==
There are currently four recognized species in this genus:

- Pronothobranchius chirioi Valdesalici, 2013
- Pronothobranchius gambiensis (Svensson, 1933)
- Pronothobranchius kiyawensis (C. G. E. Ahl, 1928)
- Pronothobranchius seymouri (Loiselle & Blair, 1972)
