= Ghatsa =

Scientific classification
- Domain: Eukaryota
- Kingdom: Animalia
- Phylum: Chordata
- Class: Actinopterygii
- Order: Cypriniformes
- Family: Balitoridae
- Genus: Ghatsa; Z. S. Randall & Page, 2015

Type species
- Homaloptera montana Herre, 1945

Genus of fishes

Ghatsa is a genus of ray-finned fish in the family Balitoridae. This genus is created for species previously assigned to Homaloptera from the Western Ghats of India.

== Species ==
There are currently 5 recognized species in this genus:

- Ghatsa menoni (Shaji & Easa, 1995)
- Ghatsa montana (Herre, 1945) (Anamalai loach)
- Ghatsa pillaii (Indra & Rema Devi, 1981) (Silent Valley loach)
- Ghatsa santhamparaiensis (Arunachalam, J. A. Johnson & Rema Devi, 2002) (Santhampara loach)
- Ghatsa silasi (Kurup & Radhakrishnan, 2011)
