= Pronothobranchius gambiensis =

Scientific classification
- Kingdom: Animalia
- Phylum: Chordata
- Class: Actinopterygii
- Order: Cyprinodontiformes
- Family: Nothobranchiidae
- Genus: Pronothobranchius
- Species: P. gambiensis

Binomial name
- Pronothobranchius gambiensis (Svensson 1933)

Species of fish

Pronothobranchius gambiensis is a species of killifish in the Nothobranchiidae family.
