= Lepthoplosternum pectorale =

Conservation status
- Least Concern (IUCN 3.1)

Scientific classification
- Kingdom: Animalia
- Phylum: Chordata
- Class: Actinopterygii
- Order: Siluriformes
- Family: Callichthyidae
- Genus: Lepthoplosternum
- Species: L. pectorale

Binomial name
- Lepthoplosternum pectorale (Boulenger, 1895)

Synonyms
- Callichthys pectoralis Boulenger, 1895; Hoplosternum pectorale (Boulenger, 1895)

Species of fish

Lepthoplosternum pectorale is a species of freshwater ray-finned fish belonging to the family Callichthyidae and the subfamily Callichthyinae, the armoured catfishes. It is found in Argentina, Brazil and Paraguay where it occurs in the Paraguay River.
