= Lepthoplosternum beni =

Conservation status
- Least Concern (IUCN 3.1)

Scientific classification
- Kingdom: Animalia
- Phylum: Chordata
- Class: Actinopterygii
- Order: Siluriformes
- Family: Callichthyidae
- Genus: Lepthoplosternum
- Species: L. beni

Binomial name
- Lepthoplosternum beni R. Reis, 1997

Species of fish

Lepthoplosternum beni is a species of freshwater ray-finned fish belonging to the family Callichthyidae and the subfamily Callichthyinae, the armoured catfishes. It is found in the upper Madeira River basin in Bolivia and Peru.
