= Lepthoplosternum ucamara =

Conservation status
- Least Concern (IUCN 3.1)

Scientific classification
- Kingdom: Animalia
- Phylum: Chordata
- Class: Actinopterygii
- Order: Siluriformes
- Family: Callichthyidae
- Genus: Lepthoplosternum
- Species: L. ucamara

Binomial name
- Lepthoplosternum ucamara R. Reis & Kaefer, 2005

Species of fish

Lepthoplosternum ucamara is a species of freshwater ray-finned fish belonging to the family Callichthyidae and the subfamily Callichthyinae, the armoured catfishes. This species is known from the Pacaya-Samiria National Reserve in the lower Ucayali River in Peru and from the area of confluence of the Solimões River and Japurá River in Brazil.
