= Enteromius stauchi =

Conservation status
- Endangered (IUCN 3.1)

Scientific classification
- Domain: Eukaryota
- Kingdom: Animalia
- Phylum: Chordata
- Class: Actinopterygii
- Order: Cypriniformes
- Family: Cyprinidae
- Genus: Enteromius
- Species: E. stauchi

Binomial name
- Enteromius stauchi (Daget, 1967)

Synonyms
- Barbus stauchi

Species of fish

Enteromius stauchi is a species of ray-finned fish in the genus Enteromius. It may be a synonym of Enteromius rubrostigma and is endemic to the Republic of the Congo.

== Footnotes ==
- Froese, Rainer; Pauly, Daniel (eds.). "Enteromius stauchi". FishBase.
