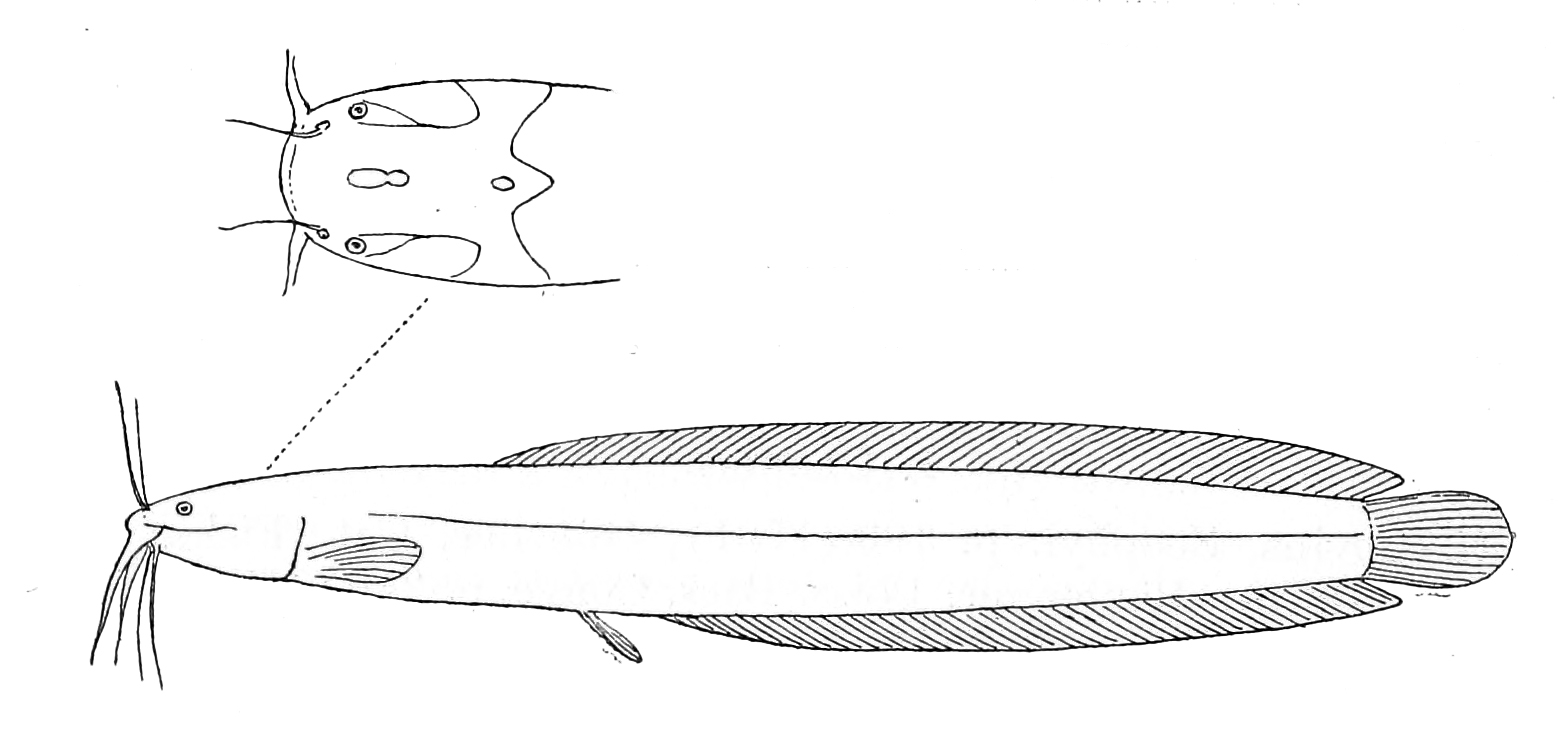
- Clariallabes longicauda

Scientific classification
- Kingdom: Animalia
- Phylum: Chordata
- Class: Actinopterygii
- Order: Siluriformes
- Family: Clariidae
- Genus: Clariallabes; Boulenger, 1900

Type species
- Clarias melas Boulenger, 1887

Species
- See text.

Synonyms
- Allabenchelys Boulenger, 1902

= Clariallabes =

Genus of fishes

Clariallabes is a genus of airbreathing catfishes found in Africa.

== Species ==
There are currently 16 recognized species in this genus:

- Clariallabes attemsi (Holly, 1927)
- Clariallabes brevibarbis Pellegrin, 1913
- Clariallabes centralis (Poll & J. G. Lambert, 1958)
- Clariallabes heterocephalus Poll, 1967
- Clariallabes laticeps (Steindachner, 1911)
- Clariallabes longicauda (Boulenger, 1902)
- Clariallabes manyangae (Boulenger, 1919)
- Clariallabes melas (Boulenger, 1887)
- Clariallabes mutsindoziensis Taverne & De Vos, 1998
- Clariallabes petricola Greenwood, 1956 (Victoria snake catfish)
- Clariallabes pietschmanni (Güntert, 1938)
- Clariallabes platyprosopos R. A. Jubb, 1965 (Broadhead catfish)
- Clariallabes simeonsi Poll, 1941
- Clariallabes teugelsi Ferraris, 2007
- Clariallabes uelensis (Poll, 1941)
- Clariallabes variabilis Pellegrin, 1926
