= Ghatsa menoni =

Conservation status
- Least Concern (IUCN 3.1)

Scientific classification
- Kingdom: Animalia
- Phylum: Chordata
- Class: Actinopterygii
- Order: Cypriniformes
- Family: Balitoridae
- Genus: Ghatsa
- Species: G. menoni

Binomial name
- Ghatsa menoni (Shaji & Easa, 1995)

Synonyms
- Homaloptera menoni Shaji & Easa, 1995

Species of fish

Ghatsa menoni is a species of ray-finned fish in the genus Ghatsa.
