= Lepthoplosternum =

Scientific classification
- Kingdom: Animalia
- Phylum: Chordata
- Class: Actinopterygii
- Order: Siluriformes
- Family: Callichthyidae
- Subfamily: Callichthyinae
- Genus: Lepthoplosternum; R. Reis, 1997

Type species
- Callichthys pectoralis Boulenger, 1895

Genus of fishes

Lepthoplosternum is a genus of freshwater ray-finned fish belonging to the family Callichthyidae and the subfamily Callichthyinae, the armoured catfishes. The catfishes in this genus are found in South America.

== Taxonomy ==
Lepthoplosternum was first proposed as genus by the Brazilian ichthyologist Roberto Esser dos Reis in 1997 with Callichthys pectoralis designated as its type species. C. pectoralis was first formally described in 1895 by George Albert Boulenger with Monte Sociedad in the Chaco Department of Paraguay given as the type locality. This genus is included in the subfamily Callichthyinae of the armoured catfish family, Callichthyidae, which is in the suborder Loricarioidei of the catfish order Siluriformes.

L. stellatum and L. ucamara are hypothesized to form a partially unresolved polytomy with L. pectorale and L. beni, which are sister-species to each other. L. tordilho is sister to these four species and L. altamazonicum is the most basal species.

== Etymology ==
Lepthoplosternum prefixes lepto, Greek for "fine" or "thin", although Reis said "small and delicate", onto the genus name Hoplosternum, an allusion to the smaller size of these catfishes compared to the species in Hoplosternum.

== Species ==
Lepthoplosternum contains the following valid species:

- Lepthoplosternum altamazonicum R. Reis, 1997
- Lepthoplosternum beni R. Reis, 1997
- Lepthoplosternum pectorale (Boulenger, 1895)
- Lepthoplosternum stellatum R. Reis & Kaefer, 2005
- Lepthoplosternum tordilho R. Reis, 1997
- Lepthoplosternum ucamara R. Reis & Kaefer, 2005

== Distribution and habitat ==
Lepthoplosternum is widely distributed in cis-Andean South America south of the Orinoco River basin.

== Ecology ==
Lepthoplosternum species usually inhabit lentic or slow flowing water bodies and are often associated with marginal or floating vegetation. L. ucamara has even been found in hypoxic conditions. However, the type locality of L. stellatum is a stream, permanently flowing and well oxygenated.

== Description ==
Lepthoplosternum species are the smallest callichthyines (maximum standard length 60.3 mm) and are easily recognized by two synapomorphies: the lower lip with deep medial notch and a small, additional lateral notch forming fleshy projections on each side; and a single unbranched ray preceding the branched ones on the anal fin.
