= Betancurichthys =

Scientific classification
- Kingdom: Animalia
- Phylum: Chordata
- Class: Actinopterygii
- Order: Siluriformes
- Family: Ariidae
- Subfamily: Ariinae
- Genus: Betancurichthys; Marceniuk, Oliveira & Ferraris, 2023

Type species
- Arius madagascariensis Vaillant, 1894

Genus of fishes

Betancurichthys is a genus of freshwater sea catfishes found on the island of Madagascar. There are currently three described species.

== Species ==
- Betancurichthys festinus (Ng & Sparks, 2003)
- Betancurichthys madagascariensis (Vaillant, 1894) (Madagascar sea catfish)
- Betancurichthys uncinatus (Ng & Sparks, 2003)
