= Ghatsa silasi =

Conservation status
- Data Deficient (IUCN 3.1)

Scientific classification
- Kingdom: Animalia
- Phylum: Chordata
- Class: Actinopterygii
- Order: Cypriniformes
- Family: Balitoridae
- Genus: Ghatsa
- Species: G. silasi

Binomial name
- Ghatsa silasi (Kurup & Radhakrishnan, 2011)

Synonyms
- Homaloptera silasi Kurup & Radhakrishnan, 2011

Species of fish

Ghatsa silasi is a species of ray-finned fish in the genus Ghatsa.
