= Madagascar sea catfish =

Conservation status
- Least Concern (IUCN 3.1)

Scientific classification
- Kingdom: Animalia
- Phylum: Chordata
- Class: Actinopterygii
- Order: Siluriformes
- Family: Ariidae
- Genus: Betancurichthys
- Species: B. madagascariensis

Binomial name
- Betancurichthys madagascariensis (Vaillant, 1894)

Synonyms
- Arius madagascariensis

Species of fish

The Madagascar sea catfish (Betancurichthys madagascariensis) is a species of fish in the family Ariidae. It is found in Madagascar, Mozambique, and Tanzania. Its natural habitats are rivers, freshwater lakes, shallow seas, and estuarine waters. The Madagascar Sea Catfish has a common length of 20 centimetres (7.9 in), but may reach 70 centimetres (28 in).
