= Ghatsa pillaii =

Conservation status
- Least Concern (IUCN 3.1)

Scientific classification
- Kingdom: Animalia
- Phylum: Chordata
- Class: Actinopterygii
- Order: Cypriniformes
- Family: Balitoridae
- Genus: Ghatsa
- Species: G. pillaii

Binomial name
- Ghatsa pillaii (Indra & Rema Devi, 1981)

Synonyms
- Homaloptera pillaii Indra & Rema Devi, 1981

Species of fish

Ghatsa pillaii also known as the Silent Valley loach is a species of ray-finned fish in the genus Ghatsa.
