= Lepthoplosternum stellatum =

Conservation status
- Least Concern (IUCN 3.1)

Scientific classification
- Kingdom: Animalia
- Phylum: Chordata
- Class: Actinopterygii
- Order: Siluriformes
- Family: Callichthyidae
- Genus: Lepthoplosternum
- Species: L. stellatum

Binomial name
- Lepthoplosternum stellatum R. Reis & Kaefer, 2005

Species of fish

Lepthoplosternum stellatum is a species of freshwater ray-finned fish belonging to the family Callichthyidae and the subfamily Callichthyinae, the armoured catfishes. This species is so far known from the type locality only, the Igarapé Repartimento, a tributary of the mouthbay lake, Tefé Lake, some 6 km south of the town of Tefé, Amazonas, Brazil.
