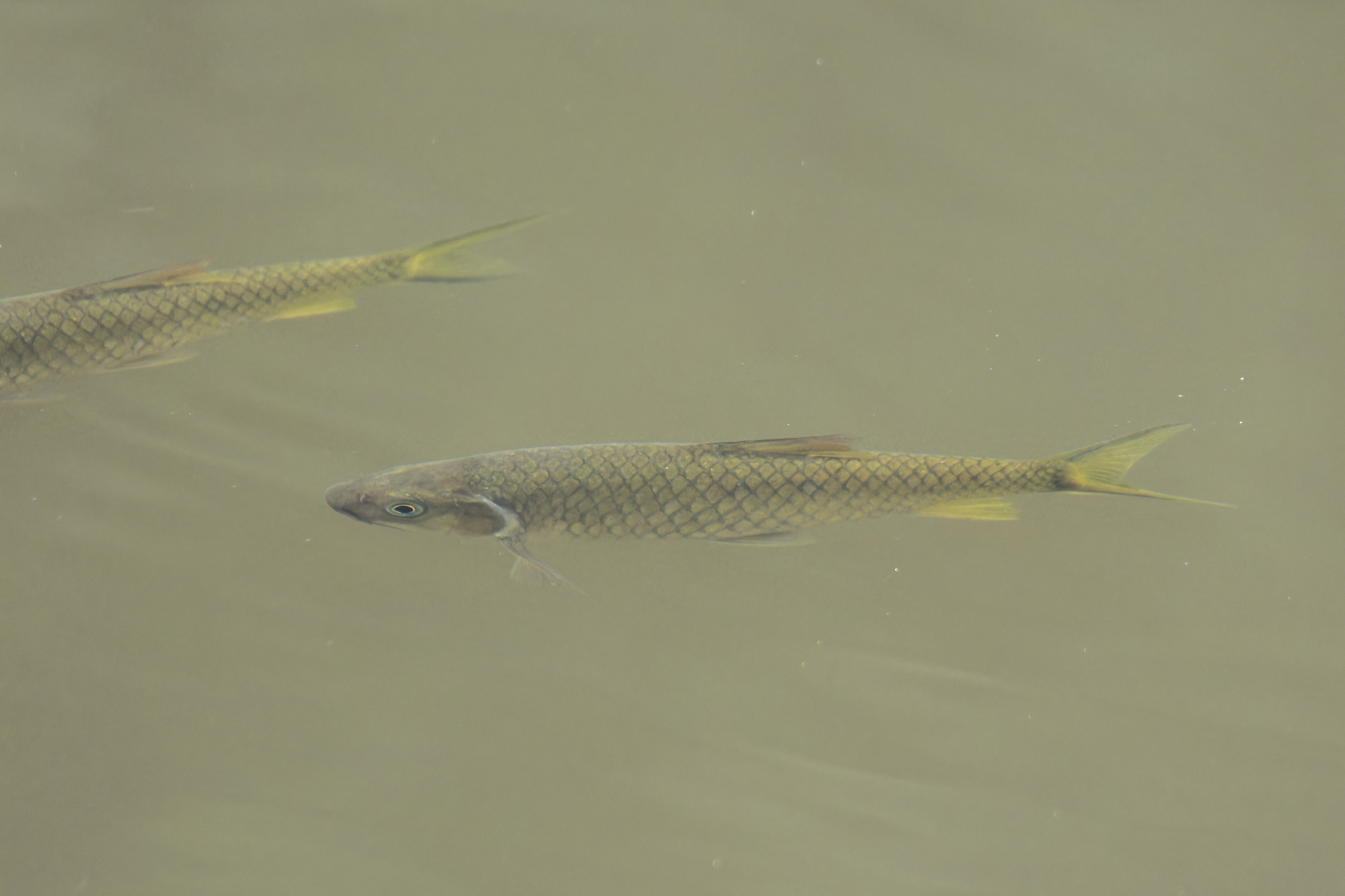

Conservation status
- Endangered (IUCN 3.1)

Scientific classification
- Kingdom: Animalia
- Phylum: Chordata
- Class: Actinopterygii
- Order: Cypriniformes
- Family: Cyprinidae
- Genus: Poropuntius
- Species: P. deauratus

Binomial name
- Poropuntius deauratus (Valenciennes, 1842)

Synonyms
- Barbus deauratus Valenciennes 1842; Poropuntius normani Smith, 1931; Poropuntius smedleyi de Beaufort, 1933; Poropuntius bolovenensis T. R. Roberts, 1998; Poropuntius lobocheiloides Kottelat, 2000; Poropuntius solitus Kottelat, 2000; Poropuntius consternans Kottelat, 2000

= Poropuntius deauratus =

Species of fish

Poropuntius deauratus is a species of ray-finned fish in the genus Poropuntius which is found in coastal river drainages in central Vietnam: between the Thu Bon River in Quang Nam Province and the Quang Tri River in Quang Tri Province. There was a marked decline in this species' abundance between 2000 and 2009 when the population may have declined by as much as 80%, this decline was probably caused by overfishing. Its habitat is medium and small sized rivers and streams where it is normally found in fast-flowing, clear water and it cannot survive where these are impounded. It diet mainly consists of fine debris, algae, diatoms, and aquatic insects.
