= Betancurichthys uncinatus =

Conservation status
- Critically Endangered (IUCN 3.1)

Scientific classification
- Kingdom: Animalia
- Phylum: Chordata
- Class: Actinopterygii
- Order: Siluriformes
- Family: Ariidae
- Genus: Betancurichthys
- Species: B. uncinatus

Binomial name
- Betancurichthys uncinatus (H. H. Ng & Sparks, 2003)

Synonyms
- Arius uncinatus

Species of fish

Betancurichthys uncinatus is a species of fish in the family Ariidae. It is endemic to Madagascar. Its natural habitats are rivers and freshwater lakes. It is threatened by habitat loss.
