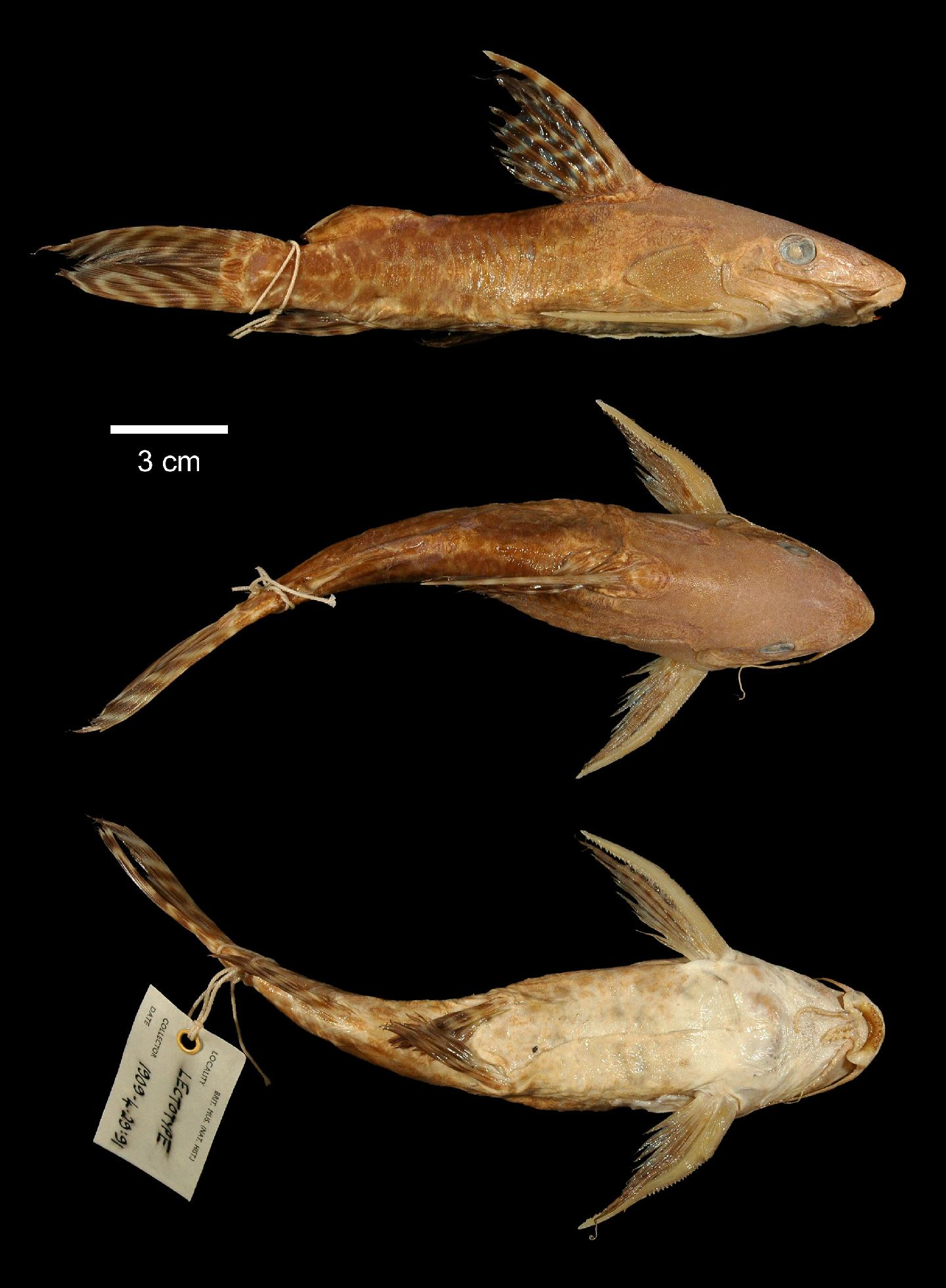

Conservation status
- Endangered (IUCN 3.1)

Scientific classification
- Kingdom: Animalia
- Phylum: Chordata
- Class: Actinopterygii
- Order: Siluriformes
- Family: Mochokidae
- Genus: Synodontis
- Species: S. pardalis

Binomial name
- Synodontis pardalis Boulenger, 1908

= Synodontis pardalis =

Species of fish

Synodontis pardalis is a species of upside-down catfish that is endemic to Cameroon where it occurs in the Dja River drainage. It was first described by British-Belgian zoologist George Albert Boulenger in 1908, from specimens collected in the Dja River in southern Cameroon. The species name pardalis is derived from the Greek word pardalis, which means "leopard", which refers to the spotted pattern on the fish.

== Description ==
Like all members of the genus Synodontis, S. pardalis has a strong, bony head capsule that extends back as far as the first spine of the dorsal fin. The head contains a distinct narrow, bony, external protrusion called a humeral process. The shape and size of the humeral process helps to identify the species. In S. pardalis, the humeral process is rough, a little longer than it is broad, with a ridge on the bottom edge, and obtusely pointed.

The fish has three pairs of barbels. The maxillary barbels are on located on the upper jaw, and two pairs of mandibular barbels are on the lower jaw. The maxillary barbel is long and straight without any branches, with a very thin membrane at the base. It extends as long or slightly shorter than the head. The outer pair of mandibular barbels is a little under twice the length of the inner pair. They have short branches.

The front edges of the dorsal fins and the pectoral fins of Syntontis species are hardened into stiff spines. In S. pardalis, the spine of the dorsal fin is about as long as the head, slightly curved, smooth in the front and serrated on the back. The remaining portion of the dorsal fin is made up of seven branching rays. The spine of the pectoral fin is serrated on both sides. The adipose fin is 3 to 4 times as long as it is deep. The anal fin contains four unbranched and seven branched rays. The tail, or caudal fin, is deeply forked, and crescent-shaped.

All members of Syndontis have a structure called a premaxillary toothpad, which is located on the very front of the upper jaw of the mouth. This structure contains several rows of short, chisel-shaped teeth. In S. pardalis, the toothpad forms a short and broad band. On the lower jaw, or mandible, the teeth of Syndontis are attached to flexible, stalk-like structures and described as "s-shaped" or "hooked". The number of teeth on the mandible is used to differentiate between species; in S. pardalis, there are about 15 to 20 teeth on the mandible.

The base body color is pale brown, becoming lighter toward the underside. The head has many small, round, dark brown spots. The body has large round dark brown spots, the base color between the spots forming a light network. The fins are white with horizontal black bands; 5 to 7 across the dorsal fin, 3 or 4 on the ventral and anal fins, and 7 to 11 on the caudal fin.

The maximum total length of the species is 23.5 centimetres (9.3 in). Generally, females in the genus Synodontis tend to be slightly larger than males of the same age.

== Habitat and behavior ==
In the wild, the species has only been found in the Dja River and its tributary, the Libi River in the Central Congo River basin. Its habitat is threatened by cobalt mining on the Dja river. The species is harvested for human consumption. The reproductive habits of most of the species of Synodontis are not known, beyond some instances of obtaining egg counts from gravid females. Spawning likely occurs during the flooding season between July and October, and pairs swim in unison during spawning. The growth rate is rapid in the first year, then slows down as the fish age.
