= Pseudophoxinus anatolicus =

Conservation status
- Endangered (IUCN 3.1)

Scientific classification
- Kingdom: Animalia
- Phylum: Chordata
- Class: Actinopterygii
- Order: Cypriniformes
- Family: Leuciscidae
- Subfamily: Leuciscinae
- Genus: Pseudophoxinus
- Species: P. anatolicus

Binomial name
- Pseudophoxinus anatolicus (Hankó, 1925)

Synonyms
- Acanthorutilus anatolicus Hankó, 1925

Species of fish

Pseudophoxinus anatolicus, also known as the giant spring minnow or Anatolian minnow, is a species of freshwater ray-finned fish belonging to the family Leuciscidae, which includes the daces, Eurasian minnows and related species. It is found only in Central Anatolia, Turkey, at a few localities. These include Lake Akgöl, Saz Lake with tributaries and Eregli marshes. It was also found in Lake Beysehir, but was extirpated there.
