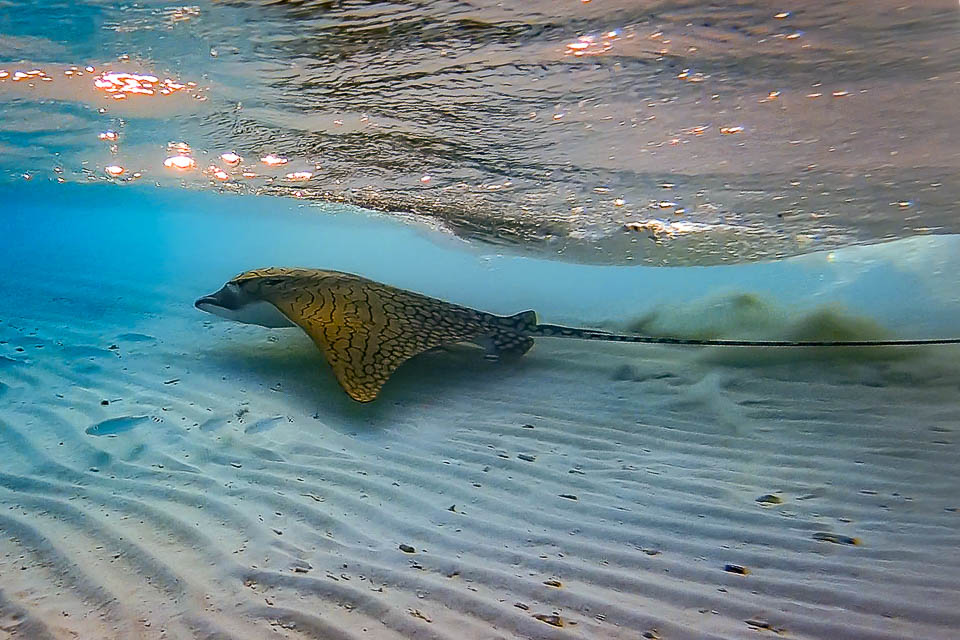
- Photo of a rarely seen ornate eagle ray (Aetomylaeus vespertilio), taken at Landaa Giraavaru, Baa Atoll, Maldives (February 2018).

Conservation status
- Critically Endangered (IUCN 3.1)

Scientific classification
- Kingdom: Animalia
- Phylum: Chordata
- Class: Chondrichthyes
- Subclass: Elasmobranchii
- Order: Myliobatiformes
- Family: Myliobatidae
- Genus: Aetomylaeus
- Species: A. vespertilio

Binomial name
- Aetomylaeus vespertilio (Bleeker, 1852)

= Ornate eagle ray =

Species of cartilaginous fish

The ornate eagle ray or reticulate eagle ray (Aetomylaeus vespertilio) is a species of large stingray of the family Myliobatidae. Like other rays, the ornate eagle ray is ovoviviparous. Aetomylaeus vespertilio is estimated to have a low fecundity similar to other myliobatids. It has a generation length of 15 years, and can grow as old as 24 years. It is a predatory cartilaginous fish, preying mostly on small invertebrates, polychaete worms, and some echinoderms. It has earned the nickname "unicorn of the sea" due to how rarely it is spotted in the wild.

== Appearance ==
Aetomylaeus vespertilio has a maximum size of around 240 cm (94 in) in disc width and a clearly distinct pattern of reticulate dark lines and rings on its back. If the extremely long tail is unbroken, it can considerably add to the maximum body length of 4 m (13 ft). Lacking a spine on the tail, it is deemed harmless to humans.

== Distribution ==
Aetomylaeus vespertilio lives in waters up to 110 m (360 ft) deep along the coasts of Australia, China, India, Indonesia, Malaysia, Maldives, Mozambique, Palau, Philippines, Seychelles, South Africa, Taiwan, and Thailand. Despite its wide range, it is rarely observed, and has been suspected to have had a large population decline within the past three generations. Currently, this species is considered Critically Endangered by the IUCN. There have been fewer than 60 confirmed sightings of Aetomylaeus vespertilio, giving it the nickname 'the unicorn of the sea.'

== Threats and conservation efforts ==
Although Aetomylaeus vespertilio was once common in areas such as the Gulf of Thailand, it is now considered rare. The largest threats are demersal fisheries, which are used frequently in the areas it lives in. When caught, it is mostly retained and sold in fish markets. No species-specific conservation measures have taken place, but there are more regulations being placed on demersal fisheries to limit the amount of Myliobatidae being caught.
