= Caddo madtom =

Conservation status
- Endangered (IUCN 3.1)

Scientific classification
- Kingdom: Animalia
- Phylum: Chordata
- Class: Actinopterygii
- Division: Teleostei
- Order: Siluriformes
- Family: Ictaluridae
- Genus: Noturus
- Species: N. taylori

Binomial name
- Noturus taylori N. H. Douglas, 1972

Species of fish

The Caddo madtom (Noturus taylori) is a species of fish in the family Ictaluridae endemic to the United States. N. taylori was named in honor of William Ralph Taylor, U.S. National Museum, in recognition of his contributions to the knowledge of catfishes. They average 2 to 4 inches (5.1 to 10.2 cm) long and weigh no more than a few ounces. N. taylori has a small to tiny, fragmented range, but is mostly found in the Caddo, Ouachita, and Little Missouri rivers in southwestern Arkansas. Ecological studies indicate that dam and bridge construction poses barriers to dispersal and migration of fish in the Ouachita Highlands. IUCNredlist.org states that better information is needed on the life history, reproductive biology, and ecology of the Caddo madtom. This species is listed as endangered on the IUCN Red List. Limited range makes this species vulnerable to habitat destruction/degradation from impoundment, pollution, and other factors. Robison and Buchanan (1988) stated, "this rare species should be considered threatened due to loss of habitat". Warren et al. (2000) categorized the species as "threatened" (likely to become endangered throughout all or a significant portion of its range).

== Geographic distribution ==
N. taylori was known only from the upper Caddo River, a tributary to the Ouachita River, Arkansas. This small madtom is the second species (the other is Etheostoma pallididorsum) apparently endemic to the upper water of the Caddo River, Ouachita River drainage, which originates in the Ouachita Mountains of southwestern Arkansas. They were found to appear in the upper Caddo River where the water is much clearer than the lower, more turbid reaches below the impounded DeGray Reservoir, which is where their distribution seems to end. They have now been collected from other nearby rivers, the Ouachita and South Fork Ouachita Rivers, connected to the same watershed. The first known collection of this species was obtained from the Caddo River, near Glenwood, Pike County, on February 21, 1970. Since then, N. taylori has been collected from the Caddo River in Montgomery, Pike, and Clark Counties in southwestern Arkansas. In principle, these fish are vulnerable to extinction by catastrophic watershed-scale environmental disturbance, and their distribution seems to have decreased in response to these vulnerabilities. This might be because species that specialize on headwater habitats might be particularly vulnerable to local extirpation because natural recolonization from adjacent rivers is unlikely.

== Ecology ==
The Caddo madtom is a specialist on headwater streams. Food includes snails, isopods, ephemeropterans (mayflies), dragonflies, caddisflies, stoneflies, aquatic lepidopterans (aquatic moths and butterflies), aquatic beetles, and dipterans (true flies), but ephemeropterans and dipterans are the dominant items. Habitat includes shallow, gravel-bottomed pools or shoals near shorelines of clear, small to medium upland rivers, especially well-compacted gravel areas below gravel riffles, where this madtom occurs under rocks, beneath large gravel, or among rubble. It prefers well-compacted gravel areas below gravel riffles where it lives under rocks, beneath large gravel, and in the interstices of rubble. Genetic results have implications for conservation and management of fish species like the Caddo madtom. At the within-drainage scale, fragmentation by natural or human activities (i.e., reservoirs) possibly affects individual movement and recolonization probabilities, resulting in genetic divergence (i.e., South Fork vs. Ouachita mainstem). Causes for decline may include siltation and turbidity in farming areas, and the dewatering of habitats by hydropower operations. Like all madtoms, they are known for their pectoral spines that contain saw-like teeth and a neurotoxin gland. These spines and toxins produce a painful sting when used, and indicate the presence of predators.

== Life history ==
This species spends its "life in the rocks". Spawning occurs from late April to May and it seems to occur only once during this time; however, no nests have been found to date. Ova counts from ripe females range up to 48 mature eggs, but average 16 eggs per female. Age of sexual maturity is yet to be determined and little is known about the Caddo madtom's reproduction. It is the only madtom with heteromorphic sex chromosomes.

== Current management ==
Ecological studies indicate that dam and bridge construction poses barriers to dispersal and migration of fishes in the Ouachita Highlands. Construction is generally destructive to aquatic habitats of any kind, unless designed specifically to help species diversity, and even then it can cause harm. As stated before, limited range makes this species vulnerable to habitat destruction/degradation from impoundment, pollution, and other factors. Robison and Buchanan (1988) stated that "this rare species should be considered threatened due to loss of habitat". Warren et al. (2000) categorized the species as "threatened" (likely to become endangered throughout all or a significant portion of its range). Noturus taylori appears to be vulnerable to local extirpation by small-scale disturbances; aquatic habitats in the region are impacted by local human activities (e.g., development, logging, gravel mining) that can adversely affect stream fishes.

== See also ==
- Ouachita madtom: related catfish also in the Ouachita River
