= Ghatsa santhamparaiensis =

Conservation status
- Endangered (IUCN 3.1)

Scientific classification
- Kingdom: Animalia
- Phylum: Chordata
- Class: Actinopterygii
- Order: Cypriniformes
- Family: Balitoridae
- Genus: Ghatsa
- Species: G. santhamparaiensis

Binomial name
- Ghatsa santhamparaiensis (Arunachalam, J. A. Johnson & Rema Devi, 2002)

Synonyms
- Homaloptera santhamparaiensis Arunachalam, Johnson & Rema Devi, 2002

Species of fish

Ghatsa santhamparaiensis, the Santhampara loach, is a species of ray-finned fish in the genus Ghatsa.
