= Enteromius bawkuensis =

Conservation status
- Least Concern (IUCN 3.1)

Scientific classification
- Kingdom: Animalia
- Phylum: Chordata
- Class: Actinopterygii
- Order: Cypriniformes
- Family: Cyprinidae
- Subfamily: Smiliogastrinae
- Genus: Enteromius
- Species: E. bawkuensis

Binomial name
- Enteromius bawkuensis (A. J. Hopson, 1965)

Synonyms
- Barbus bawkuensis Hopson, 1965

Species of ray-finned fish

Enteromius bawkuensis is a species of ray-finned fish in the genus Enteromius. It is only known from the White Volta and the Sokoto River, a tributary of the Niger in Burkina Faso, Ghana and Nigeria.
