= Roughnose stingray =

Conservation status
- Endangered (IUCN 3.1)

Scientific classification
- Kingdom: Animalia
- Phylum: Chordata
- Class: Chondrichthyes
- Subclass: Elasmobranchii
- Order: Myliobatiformes
- Family: Dasyatidae
- Genus: Pastinachus
- Species: P. solocirostris

Binomial name
- Pastinachus solocirostris Last, Manjaji & Yearsley, 2005

Species of cartilaginous fish

The roughnose stingray (Pastinachus solocirostris) is a little-known species of stingray in the family Dasyatidae, generally found in shallow, estuarine waters associated with mangroves off Borneo, Sumatra, and possibly Java. Growing to 72 cm (28 in) across, this species has a rhomboid pectoral fin disc and a whip-like tail with a ventral fin fold. It is characterized by its pointed snout, which is covered by dermal denticles. Reproduction is aplacental viviparous, with females possibly bearing as few as one pup at a time. The International Union for Conservation of Nature (IUCN) has assessed the roughnose stingray as Endangered; it is threatened by overfishing and the destruction and degradation of its mangrove habitat.

== Taxonomy ==
Peter Last, B. Mabel Manjaji, and Gordon Yearsley described the roughnose stingray in a 2005 paper for the scientific journal Zootaxa, giving it the specific epithet solocirostris from the Latin solocis ("rough" or "bristly") and rostrum ("snout"). The type specimen is an adult male 41 cm (16 in) across, collected from the fish market in Mukah, Sarawak, Malaysia.

== Distribution and habitat ==
The roughnose stingray is found along the western coast of Borneo, off the Sarawak, Brunei, and the extreme southwestern corner of Sabah, as well as off northeastern Sumatra. Specimens are also known from fish markets in Jakarta on Java, but their original localities are unknown. This bottom-dwelling species seems to be restricted to turbid coastal waters and mangrove estuaries, particularly where there is high freshwater outflow from rivers. It has been recorded to a depth of 30 m (98 ft) but most occur shallower than 10 m (33 ft).

== Description ==
The pectoral fin disc of the roughnose stingray is slightly wider than long, diamond-shaped, and rounded on the outer corners. The anterior margins are gently sinuous and converge at the triangular tip of the snout with an angle of under 110°. The eyes are small and not highly elevated; the large spiracles are positioned immediately behind. There is a curtain of skin between the nares, with its posterior margin forming two distinct lobes. The upper jaw is strongly curved with the center projecting downwards at a right angle, abutting the center of the bow-shaped lower jaw. The large, blunt teeth have hexagonal crowns and are arranged in a quincunx pattern. There are around 20 upper tooth rows and 25 lower tooth rows. Five papillae are found in a row across the floor of the mouth, with the outermost pair smaller and set apart from the others.

The pelvic fins are triangular. The tail is moderately thick at the base and tapers evenly to the tip; it can measure three times as long as the disc or more, and bears one or two serrated stinging spines positioned about one body length past the base. Behind the sting, there is a slender ventral fin fold. The upper surface of the disc is densely covered by dermal denticles almost to the margins; a transverse row of 1–3 enlarged thorns, with the central one the largest and pearl-like, is present in the middle of the back. Denticles are also present on the back and sides of the tail, at the base and behind the sting. In life, the back is covered by a thick layer of mucus. The dorsal coloration is plain olive to brown, becoming pinkish towards the disc margins and on the pelvic fins, and darkening to almost black towards the tip of the tail. The underside is nearly white, becoming pinkish towards the fin margins. The pointed, denticle-covered snout distinguishes this species from the rest of the genus. The maximum known disc width is 72 cm (28 in).

== Biology and ecology ==
Like other stingrays, the roughnose stingray is aplacental viviparous; developing embryos are nourished by yolk, later supplemented by histotroph ("uterine milk") produced by the mother. One recorded female was gestating a single late-term fetus. Newborns measure 22–23 cm (8.7–9.1 in) across; males attain sexual maturity at a disc width of 28–40 cm (11–16 in), and females at a disc width of 50–60 cm (20–24 in).

== Human interactions ==
The roughnose stingray is subject to intensive fishing pressure in much of its range. It and other rays are targeted by bottom longline fisheries off Kalimantan, and this species is also sometimes captured by bottom trawl and demersal gillnet fisheries off Kalimantan and Sumatra. The meat, and probably also skin, is utilized. Another major threat to the roughnose stingray is habitat destruction: from 1980 to 2005, over 30% of the mangroves in Malaysia and Indonesia, which serve as critical habitat, have been cleared for various purposes. In addition, there is widespread habitat degradation in the region from blast fishing, agricultural runoff, and coastal development. As a result of these pressures, the International Union for Conservation of Nature (IUCN) has assessed this species as Endangered.
