= Nemacheilus jordanicus =

Conservation status
- Endangered (IUCN 3.1)

Scientific classification
- Kingdom: Animalia
- Phylum: Chordata
- Class: Actinopterygii
- Order: Cypriniformes
- Family: Nemacheilidae
- Genus: Nemacheilus
- Species: N. jordanicus

Binomial name
- Nemacheilus jordanicus Banarescu, Nalbent & Goren, 1982

Species of fish

Nemacheilus jordanicus is a species of ray-finned fish in the family Balitoridae. It is found in Israel, Jordan, and Syria. Its natural habitat is rivers and it is threatened by habitat loss.
