= Anatolichthys sureyanus =

Conservation status
- Endangered (IUCN 3.1)

Scientific classification
- Kingdom: Animalia
- Phylum: Chordata
- Class: Actinopterygii
- Order: Cyprinodontiformes
- Family: Aphaniidae
- Genus: Anatolichthys
- Species: A. sureyanus

Binomial name
- Anatolichthys sureyanus (Neu, 1937)

Synonyms
- Cyprinodon sureyanus Neu, 1937; Lebias sureyanus (Neu, 1937); Aphanius burduricus Akşiray, 1948

Species of fish

Anatolichthys sureyanus, the Burdur toothcarp or Sureyan killifish, is a species of freshwater fish in the family Aphaniidae.

The species is endemic to Lake Burdur in Turkey. It feeds mainly on an endemic copepod Arctodiaptomus burduricus. The toothcarp is threatened by the water loss of Lake Burdur due to the feeds into the lake being dammed, excessive water being taken from the lake, and a reduction in rainfall due to climate change. An increase in salinity levels further impacts the species.
