= Clariallabes mutsindoziensis =

Conservation status
- Endangered (IUCN 3.1)

Scientific classification
- Kingdom: Animalia
- Phylum: Chordata
- Class: Actinopterygii
- Order: Siluriformes
- Family: Clariidae
- Genus: Clariallabes
- Species: C. mutsindoziensis

Binomial name
- Clariallabes mutsindoziensis Taverne & De Vos, 1998

Species of fish

Clariallabes mutsindoziensis is a species of airbreathing catfish endemic to Burundi where it is found in the Malagarasi River. Its natural habitats are rivers and inland deltas. It is threatened by habitat loss. This species grows to a length of 11.8 cm (4.6 inches) SL.

== Sources ==
- Froese, Rainer; Pauly, Daniel (eds.). "Clariallabes mutsindoziensis". FishBase. December 2011 version.
