= Haplochromis igneopinnis =

Conservation status
- Endangered (IUCN 3.1)

Scientific classification
- Kingdom: Animalia
- Phylum: Chordata
- Class: Actinopterygii
- Order: Cichliformes
- Family: Cichlidae
- Genus: Haplochromis
- Species: H. igneopinnis

Binomial name
- Haplochromis igneopinnis (Seehausen & Lippitsch, 1998)

Synonyms
- Pundamilia igneopinnis Seehausen & Lippitsch, 1998

Species of fish

Haplochromis igneopinnis is a species of cichlid endemic to the Tanzanian portion of Lake Victoria in the Speke Gulf. This species can reach a length of 10.8 centimetres (4.3 in) SL.
