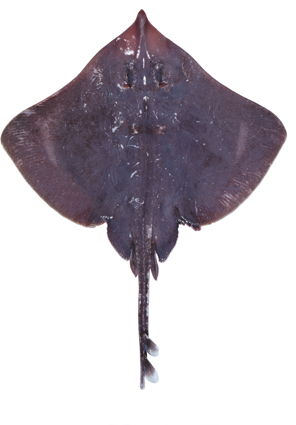

Conservation status
- Endangered (IUCN 3.1)

Scientific classification
- Kingdom: Animalia
- Phylum: Chordata
- Class: Chondrichthyes
- Subclass: Elasmobranchii
- Order: Rajiformes
- Family: Rajidae
- Genus: Dipturus
- Species: D. canutus

Binomial name
- Dipturus canutus Last, 2008

= Grey skate =

Species of cartilaginous fish

The grey skate (Dipturus canutus) is a species of fish in the family Rajidae. It was described in 2008 by Australian ichthyologist Peter R. Last.

== Taxonomy ==
Australian ichthyologist Peter Last described the grey skate from a specimen collected off Maria Island in Tasmania. The species name is the Latin adjective canutus "grey", referring to its colour.

== Description ==
The grey skate is a medium-sized member of the genus, reaching 90 centimetres (35 in) TL. It has grey upperparts, with the snout lateral to the rostral cartilage slightly paler, and paler grey to whitish underparts, with well-demarkated dark markings around the cloaca, internasal flap and chin.

== Distribution and habitat ==
It is found in temperate waters off southern Australia, from Eucla in Western Australia around to Crowdy Head on the New South Wales north coast. In Tasmanian waters, it has been found from Strahan around to Maria Island, but is not in Bass Strait. It lives at depths of 400–600 metres (1,300–2,000 ft) on the higher continental slope, rarely extending to 300 metres (980 ft) above and 730 metres (2,400 ft) below.

The grey skate is one of four species identified as threatened with extinction by trawling in a 2021 report.

Grey skates get caught up in demersal trawling and automatic longline fishing on the upper parts of the continental slope by the Southern and Eastern Scalefish and Shark fishery and the Great Australian Bight Trawl Fishery. Most die as a result. The Upper Slope Dogfish Management Strategy gives some shelter – around 4,738 square kilometres (1,829 sq mi) between the depths of 200 and 650 metres (660 and 2,130 ft) provide a haven. Little is known about the total population.
