= Oxynoemacheilus mesudae =

Conservation status
- Endangered (IUCN 3.1)

Scientific classification
- Kingdom: Animalia
- Phylum: Chordata
- Class: Actinopterygii
- Order: Cypriniformes
- Family: Nemacheilidae
- Genus: Oxynoemacheilus
- Species: O. mesudae

Binomial name
- Oxynoemacheilus mesudae Erk'Akan, 2012

Species of fish

Oxynoemacheilus mesudae, the Işıklı loach, is a species of stone loach from the genus Oxynoemacheilus. It is endemic to the Lake Işıklı basin in central Anatolia, Turkey where it is known from four springs.

Oxynoemacheilus mesudae was first formally described in 2012 by the Turkish biologist Füsun Erk'Akan and is named in honour of Erk'akan's mother, Mesude Kaynak.
