= Enteromius rubrostigma =

Conservation status
- Least Concern (IUCN 3.1)

Scientific classification
- Domain: Eukaryota
- Kingdom: Animalia
- Phylum: Chordata
- Class: Actinopterygii
- Order: Cypriniformes
- Family: Cyprinidae
- Subfamily: Smiliogastrinae
- Genus: Enteromius
- Species: E. rubrostigma

Binomial name
- Enteromius rubrostigma (Poll & J. G. Lambert, 1964)

Synonyms
- Barbus rubrostigma

Species of fish

Enteromius rubrostigma is a species of ray-finned fish in the genus Enteromius which is found in coastal rivers in Gabon, Cameroon, Republic of the Congo and Democratic Republic of the Congo.

== Footnotes ==
- Froese, Rainer; Pauly, Daniel (eds.). "Enteromius rubrostigma". FishBase.
