= Betancurichthys festinus =

Arius festinus

Conservation status
- Critically Endangered (IUCN 3.1)

Scientific classification
- Kingdom: Animalia
- Phylum: Chordata
- Class: Actinopterygii
- Division: Teleostei
- Order: Siluriformes
- Family: Ariidae
- Genus: Betancurichthys
- Species: B. festinus

Binomial name
- Betancurichthys festinus (H. H. Ng & Sparks, 2003)

Synonyms
- Arius festinus

Species of catfish

Betancurichthys festinus is a species of fish within the Ariidae family. It is endemic to Madagascar. Its natural habitat is rivers. It is threatened by habitat loss.
