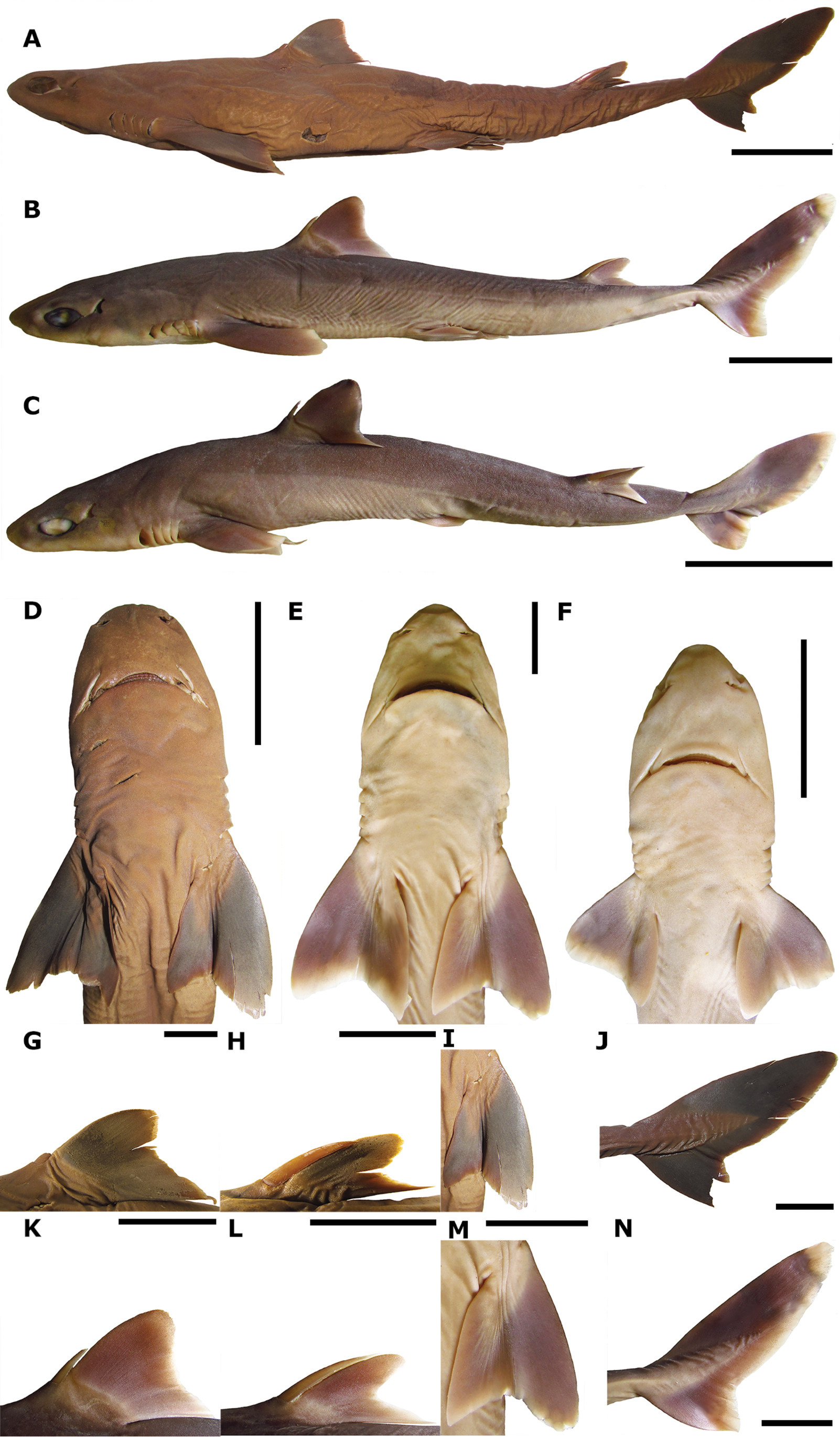

Conservation status
- Endangered (IUCN 3.1)

Scientific classification
- Kingdom: Animalia
- Phylum: Chordata
- Class: Chondrichthyes
- Subclass: Elasmobranchii
- Division: Selachii
- Order: Squaliformes
- Family: Squalidae
- Genus: Squalus
- Species: S. brevirostris

Binomial name
- Squalus brevirostris (Tanaka, 1917)

= Japanese shortnose spurdog =

Species of shark

The Japanese shortnose spurdog (Squalus brevirostris) is a dogfish shark in the genus Squalus. It is found from southern Japan to the South China Sea. The length of the longest specimen measured is 60 cm (24 in).
