= Enteromius aliciae =

Conservation status
- Vulnerable (IUCN 3.1)

Scientific classification
- Kingdom: Animalia
- Phylum: Chordata
- Class: Actinopterygii
- Order: Cypriniformes
- Family: Cyprinidae
- Subfamily: Smiliogastrinae
- Genus: Enteromius
- Species: E. aliciae

Binomial name
- Enteromius aliciae Bigorne & Lévêque, 1993

Synonyms
- Barbus aliciae Bigorne & Lévêque, 1993

Species of fish

Enteromius aliciae is a species of ray-finned fish in the genus Enteromius. It has been reported only from two locations in Saint John River, Liberia, and Saint Paul River, Guinea; and is threatened by siltation of its habitat, consequent upon deforestation.
