= Lepthoplosternum tordilho =

Conservation status
- Near Threatened (IUCN 3.1)

Scientific classification
- Kingdom: Animalia
- Phylum: Chordata
- Class: Actinopterygii
- Order: Siluriformes
- Family: Callichthyidae
- Genus: Lepthoplosternum
- Species: L. tordilho

Binomial name
- Lepthoplosternum tordilho R. Reis, 1997

Species of fish

Lepthoplosternum tordilho is a species of freshwater ray-finned fish belonging to the family Callichthyidae and the subfamily Callichthyinae, the armoured catfishes. This fish is found in the lower Jacui River drainage in southern Brazil.
