= Enteromius traorei =

Conservation status
- Vulnerable (IUCN 3.1)

Scientific classification
- Kingdom: Animalia
- Phylum: Chordata
- Class: Actinopterygii
- Order: Cypriniformes
- Family: Cyprinidae
- Subfamily: Smiliogastrinae
- Genus: Enteromius
- Species: E. traorei

Binomial name
- Enteromius traorei Lévêque, Teugels & Thys van den Audenaerde, 1987

Synonyms
- Barbus traorei

Species of fish

Enteromius traorei is a species of ray-finned fish in the genus Enteromius which has only been recorded from the River Cavally in the Ivory Coast and which is threatened by deforestation.

== Footnotes ==
- Froese, Rainer; Pauly, Daniel (eds.). "Enteromius traorei". FishBase.
