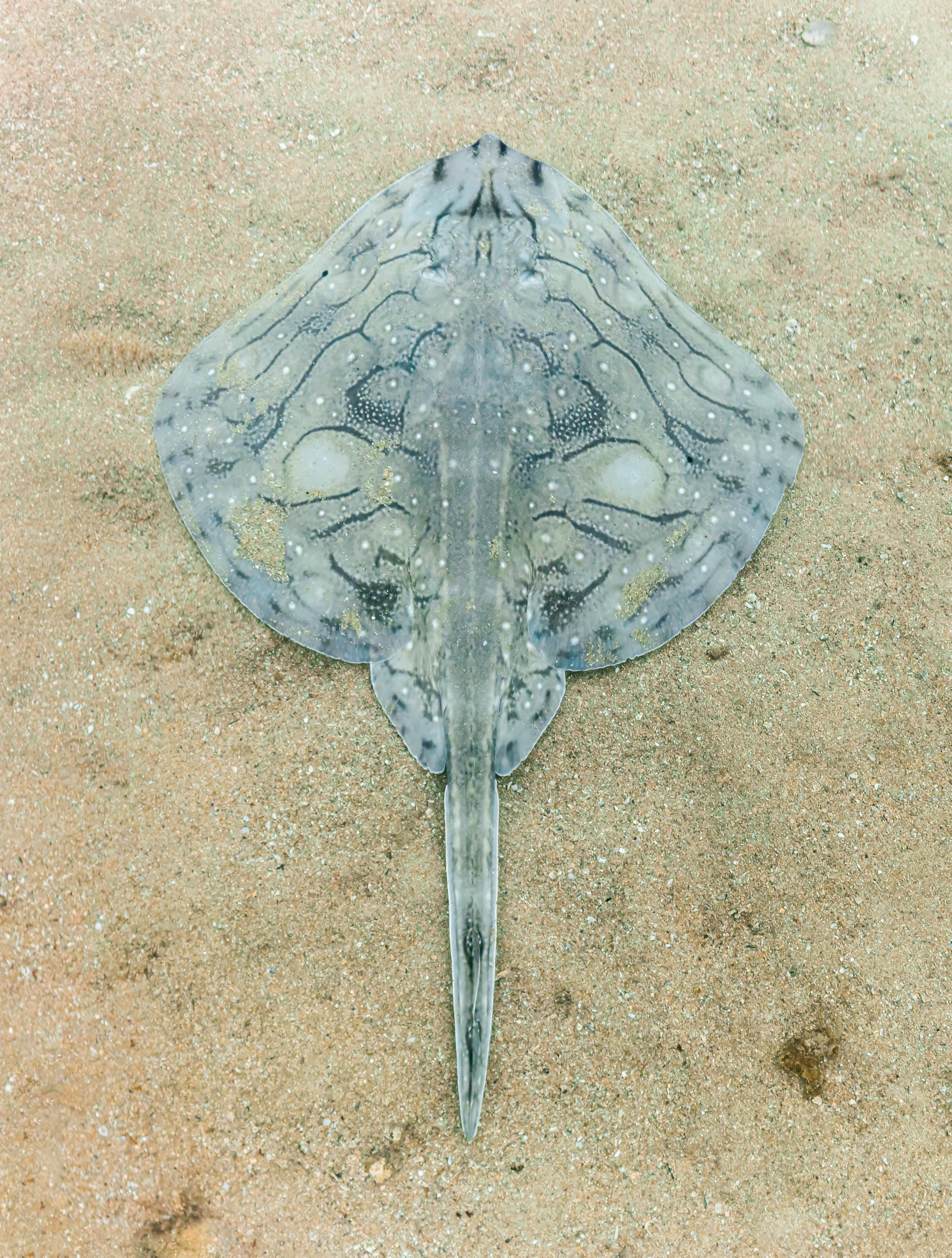

Conservation status
- Near Threatened (IUCN 3.1)

Scientific classification
- Kingdom: Animalia
- Phylum: Chordata
- Class: Chondrichthyes
- Subclass: Elasmobranchii
- Order: Rajiformes
- Family: Rajidae
- Genus: Raja
- Species: R. undulata

Binomial name
- Raja undulata Lacépède, 1802

= Undulate ray =

Species of cartilaginous fish

The undulate ray (Raja undulata) is a species of skate and cartilaginous fish found in the Mediterranean and East Atlantic from southern Ireland and England to the Gulf of Guinea. It is found in areas with mud or sand, and may occur as deep as 200 m (660 ft), though it prefers shallower depths. It is considered endangered due to overfishing.

== Description ==
The undulate ray features a disc-shaped body, triangular in the front and near-circular in the rear, and dermal denticles developed as spines for protection. Median spines are scattered in adults, regular on young. The males have one lateral row each side, whereas the females have three. There are 0-2 interdorsal spines. Adult males have alar spines. The eyes are medium-sized and followed by spiracles. The mouth is on the ventral surface and is slightly arched, followed by the five pairs of small gill slits. Tail is as long as body, and has two well separated dorsal fins near its end, usually with two spines between them. The colouring of the dorsal surface varies from light brown to citrine or grey, with darker waved bands and numerous small white patches. Snout and margins are frequently clearer with dark spots. The underside is creamy-white with a greyish margin. It typically weighs about 10 lb (4.5 kg), but can reach to as much as 22.13 lb (10.04 kg) and 100 cm (39 in) in length.

== Distribution and habitat ==
This species has a patchy and discontinuous distribution in northeastern Atlantic. It is found from southern Ireland and England to Senegal, and in the western Mediterranean. It is uncommon overall but can be locally abundant, mainly around the north-west of Ireland, in the eastern side of the English Channel, and near the south coast of Portugal. It is also present sporadically across the northern Mediterranean Sea. It is usually found on sandy, muddy or detrital bottoms, at depths of 50–200 m from coastal regions to the upper continental slope, even if it's sometimes possible to find it in shallower water.

== Biology ==
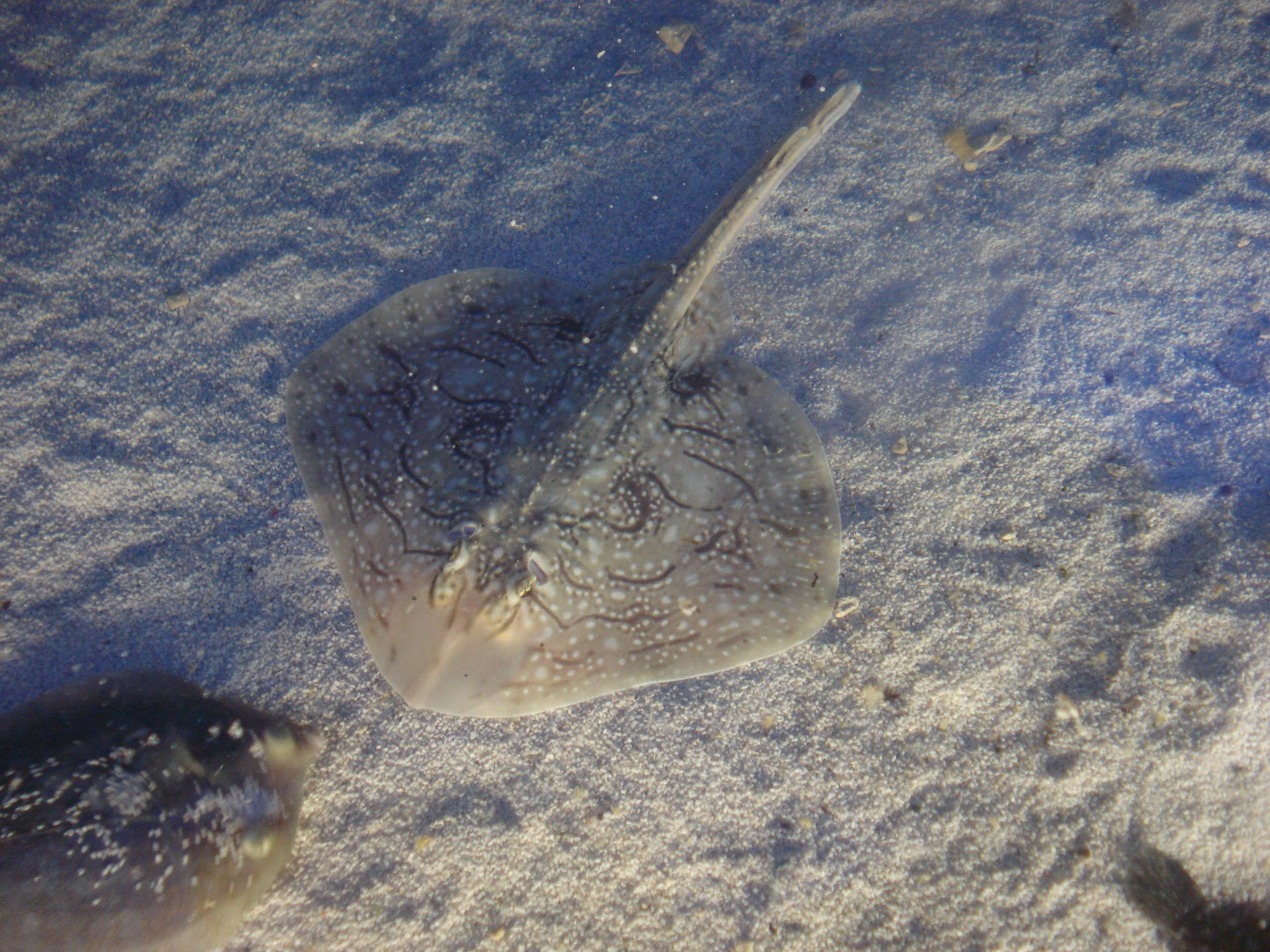
Young Raja undulata at the Aquarium of Genoa

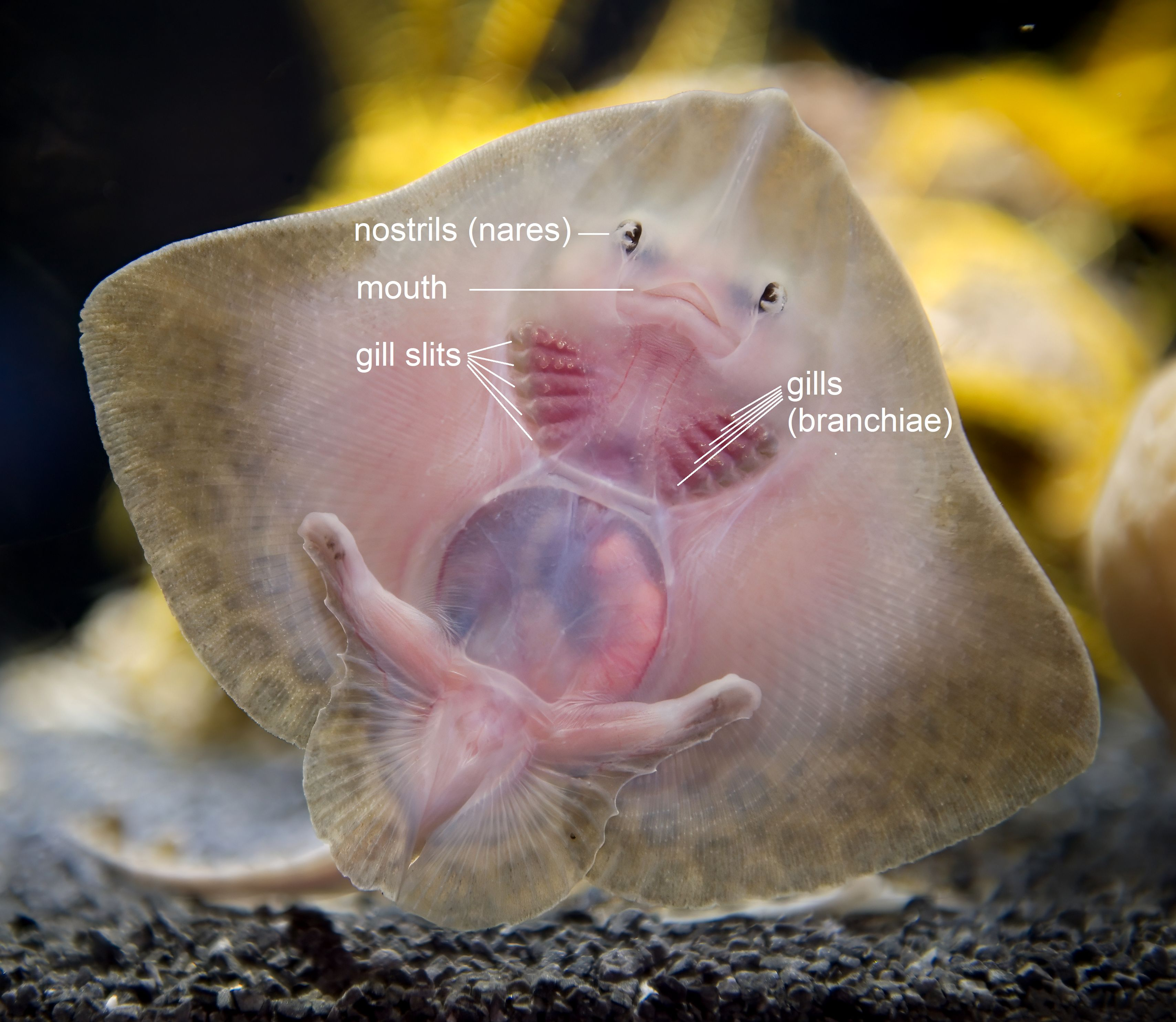
Ventral side of a young Raja undulata

There are few data about biology of this species. Using vertebrae as growth markers, maximum lifespan was supposed to be 21–23 years. It's an oviparous cartilaginous fish. The females lay their eggs from March to September. Females lay around 30 eggs per year. Sexual maturity is reached at around 9 years of age for females, and 8 years for males. Each egg is a leathery black eggcase with horny corners, known by the common name "mermaid's purse" (as are the eggcases of other rays, skates and sharks). They usually are 72– 90 mm long and 42– 52 mm wide. These "purses" often wash up on beaches after rough weather, although usually they wash up empty, the young ray having already hatched out.

== Diet ==
The ray eats small fish, crustaceans, molluscs and other macrobenthos.

== Human interactions ==
Like other benthonic species of similar size this ray is caught incidentally or intentionally by commercial fisheries using trawls, gillnets, and line gears. It is a common host in public aquariums as fares relatively well.

== Protection ==
Because of its late sexual maturity and low rate of population growth, undulate ray is extremely vulnerable to exploitation by fisheries. In the north Atlantic, populations have declined severely from the Irish area, and there are no longer records of catches of this species in the English Channel. Since 2009 it has been illegal to keep Undulate Rays fished in EU waters due to concerns over the decreasing size of stocks. They must be returned unharmed if possible.

== Reproduction ==
During a study it was found that the gonadosomatic index for the females was higher in the winter, which means that this specie reproduces during this season. Females also matured at significantly larger sized and older ages than males.
