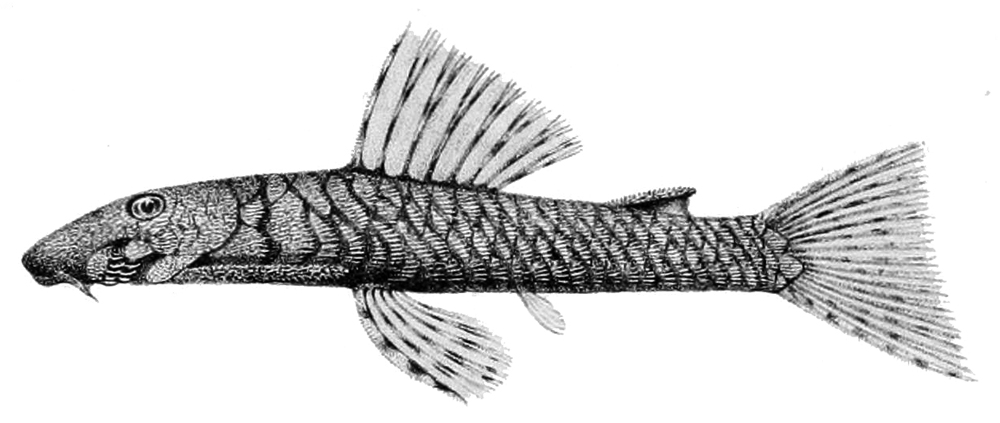

Conservation status
- Endangered (IUCN 3.1)

Scientific classification
- Kingdom: Animalia
- Phylum: Chordata
- Class: Actinopterygii
- Order: Siluriformes
- Family: Loricariidae
- Genus: Ancistrus
- Species: A. marcapatae

Binomial name
- Ancistrus marcapatae (Regan, 1904)

Synonyms
- Chaetostomus marcapatae Regan, 1904; Chaetostoma marcapatae Regan, 1904; Xenocara heterorhynchus Regan, 1912; Ancistrus heterorhynchus Regan, 1912; Xenocara boliviana Steindachner, 1915; Ancistrus bolivianus (Steindachner. 1915)

= Ancistrus marcapatae =

Species of catfish

Ancistrus marcapatae is a species of freshwater ray-finned fish belonging to the family Loricariidae, the suckermouth armoured catfishes, and the subfamily Hypostominae, the suckermouth catfishes. This catfish is endemic to Peru.

== Taxonomy ==
Ancistrus marcapatae was first formally described in 1912 by the British ichthyologist Charles Tate Regan, with its type locality given as the Marcapata Valley, in the Inambari River basin of eastern Peru. Eschmeyer's Catalog of Fishes classified the genus Ancistrus in the subfamily Hypostominae, the suckermouth catfishes, within the suckermouth armored catfish family Loricariidae. It has also been classified in the tribe Ancistrini by some authorities.

== Etymology ==
Ancistrus marcapatae is classified in the genus Ancistrus, a name coined by Rudolf Kner, but when he proposed the genus he did not explain the etymology of the name. It is thought to be from the Greek ágkistron, meaning a "fish hook" or the "hook of a spindle", a reference to the hooked odontodes on the interopercular bone. The specific name, marcapatae, means of the Marcapata Valley, the type locality of this species.

== Description ==
Ancistrus marcapatae reaches a total length of 12.4 cm (4.9 in). Ancistrus species develop soft, bushy tentacles on the snout when sexually mature, these are better developed in the males than they are in females.

== Distribution ==
Ancistrus marcapatae is endemic to Peru, where it is known only from the Inambari River basin in Madre de Dios Department which sits between 304 and 1,108 m (997 and 3,635 ft) above sea level.

== Conservation status ==
Ancistrus marcapatae has a highly restricted range and it has only been recorded from one location, one that is subject to illegal gold mining and deforestation. These activities have both lead to a continuous decline in habitat quality. The International Union for Conservation of Nature have classified this catfish as Endangered.
