= Shawnee darter =

Conservation status
- Endangered (IUCN 3.1)

Scientific classification
- Kingdom: Animalia
- Phylum: Chordata
- Class: Actinopterygii
- Order: Perciformes
- Family: Percidae
- Genus: Etheostoma
- Species: E. tecumsehi

Binomial name
- Etheostoma tecumsehi Ceas & Page, 1997

Species of fish

The Shawnee darter (Etheostoma tecumsehi) is a species of freshwater ray-finned fish, a darter from the subfamily Etheostomatinae, part of the family Percidae, which also contains the perches, ruffes and pikeperches. It is endemic to the eastern United States, where it occurs in the upper Pond River in Kentucky. It inhabits shallow gravel riffles and rocky runs and pools of headwaters, creeks, and small rivers. This species can reach a length of 5.4 cm (2.1 in).
