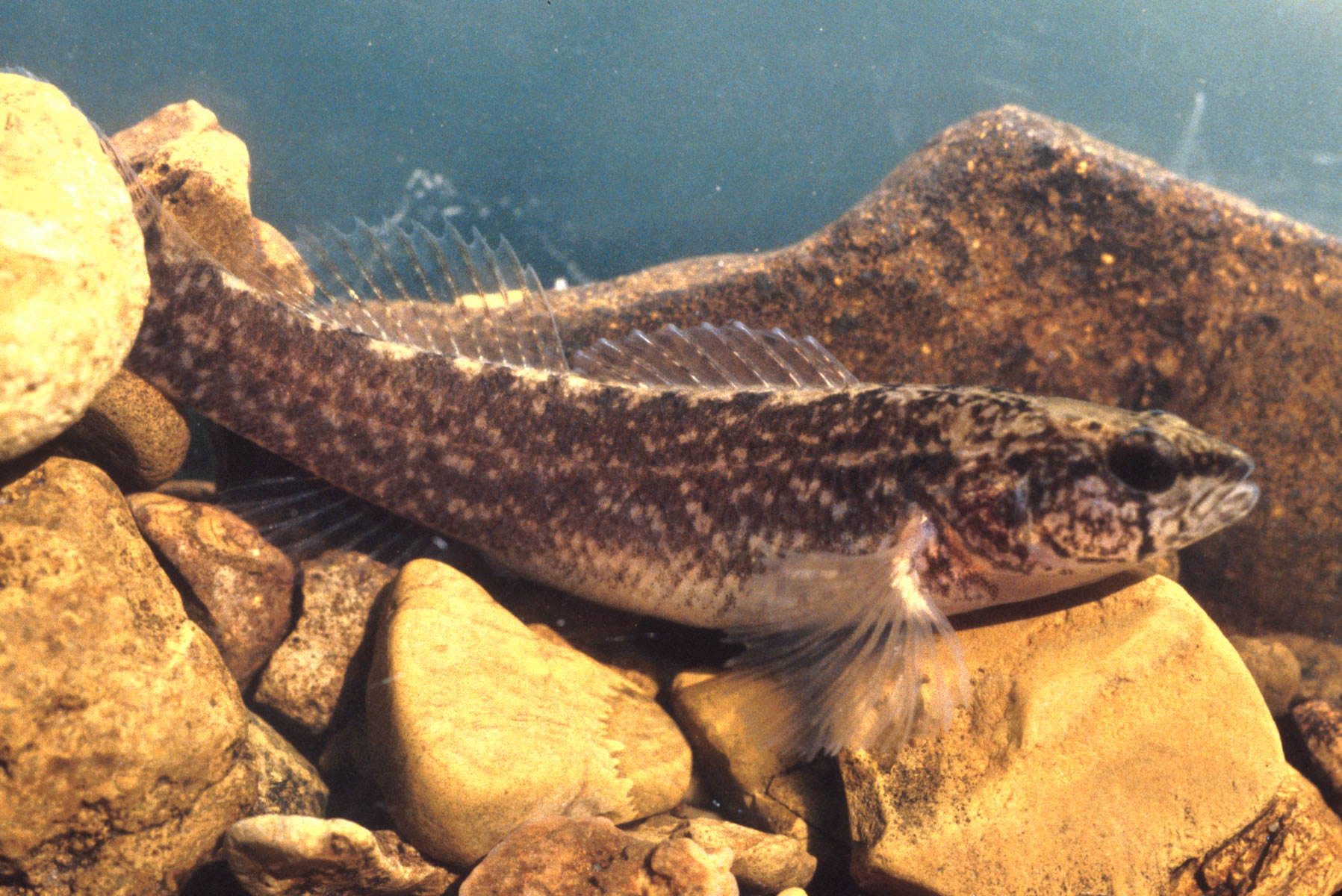

Conservation status
- Endangered (IUCN 3.1)

- Threatened (ESA)

Scientific classification
- Kingdom: Animalia
- Phylum: Chordata
- Class: Actinopterygii
- Order: Perciformes
- Family: Percidae
- Genus: Etheostoma
- Species: E. chienense

Binomial name
- Etheostoma chienense Page & Ceas, 1992

= Relict darter =

Species of fish

The relict darter (Etheostoma chienense) is a rare species of freshwater ray-finned fish, a darter from the subfamily Etheostomatinae, part of the family Percidae, which also contains the perches, ruffes and pikeperches. It is endemic to Kentucky, where it occurs only in the drainage of the Bayou de Chien. It is a federally listed threatened species of the United States.

The relict darter is part of the Etheostoma squamiceps species complex and was formally described in 1992. It grows up to about 7.2 centimetres (2.8 in) in length and is characterized by "lollipop-like" white knobs on the second dorsal fin of the male that develops during the breeding season. The species is only found in a 35-kilometre (22 mi) stretch of the Bayou de Chien, a tributary of the Mississippi River in Kentucky. It shelters in areas where the riverbank is undercut and water flows beneath a mat of roots. The substrate is sand and gravel covered in leaf litter. This type of habitat is not continuous on the river, leaving wide spaces between patches of appropriate habitat.

The relict darter's diet is mainly insects. During reproduction, eggs are stuck to the undersides of sticks and rocks. Only one spawning area has been observed.

This species is limited to one small river system which has been altered and no longer has much habitat or appropriate spawning areas. Agriculture and the channelization of the river have effected these changes.

The USFWS proposed reclassification of the relict darter to "threatened" in March 2022, having previously listed it endangered effective January 1994. It cited the existence of two locations, Bayou de Chien and Jackson Creek, both part of the same population, where reproduction and recruitment were occurring based on survey data. Localized improvements to stream habitat have occurred due to conservation efforts, but threats remain. Reclassification took place effective October 27, 2023.
