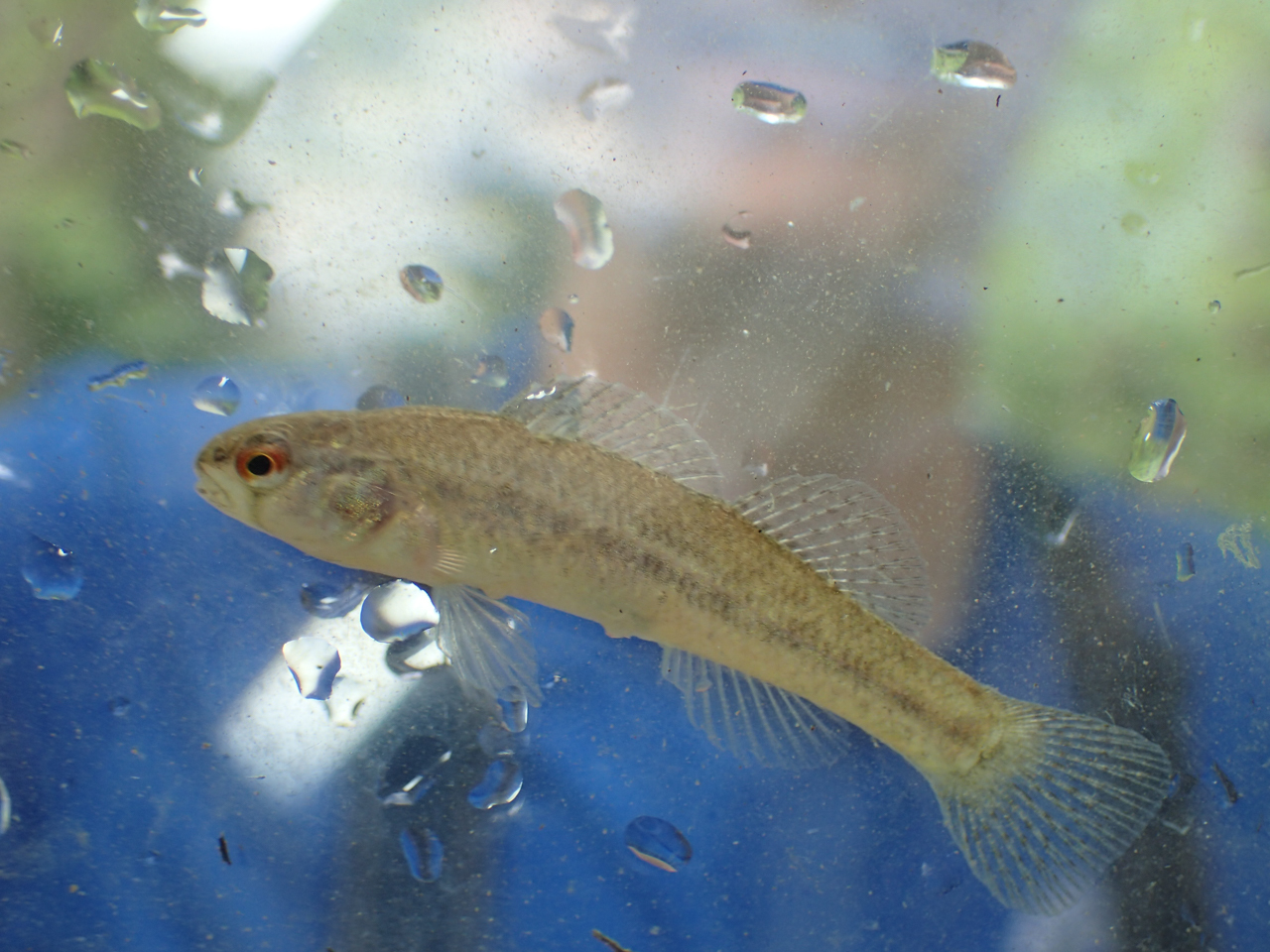

Conservation status
- Endangered (IUCN 3.1)

- Endangered (ESA)

Scientific classification
- Kingdom: Animalia
- Phylum: Chordata
- Class: Actinopterygii
- Division: Teleostei
- Order: Perciformes
- Family: Percidae
- Genus: Etheostoma
- Species: E. phytophilum

Binomial name
- Etheostoma phytophilum Bart & M. S. Taylor, 1999

= Rush darter =

Species of fish

The rush darter (Etheostoma phytophilum) is a rare and endangered species of freshwater ray-finned fish, a darter from the subfamily Etheostomatinae, part of the family Percidae, which also contains the perches, ruffes and pikeperches. It is endemic to Alabama in the United States, where it occurs in three river systems. It was federally listed as an endangered species of the United States on August 9, 2011.

This fish measures about 5 centimetres (2.0 in) in length. It is similar to its relative, the goldstripe darter (Etheostoma parvipinne), but with paler coloration. This species is brownish in color and they frequently show orange or red markings in the eyes. They have a lifespan of 2–3 years.

The rush darter lives in clear, shallow waters where it shelters around the root masses of aquatic vegetation. It tolerates a variety of substrates, including sand, silt, and gravel. The fry develop in wetland pools. Little else is known about the fish's lifecycle.

This fish is currently known from three Alabama river drainages: the Clear Creek drainage in Winston County, some springs in Jefferson County, and Little Cove Creek drainage in Etowah County. Its total range is contained in 14.5 kilometres (9.0 mi) of waterways.

This species is threatened by the degradation of its habitat from excessive sedimentation.

The rush darter was first formally described in 1999 by Henry L. Bart Jr. and Michael S. Taylor with the type locality given as a spring run tributary to Turkey Creek along Alabama State Route 79, Pinson in Jefferson County, Alabama.
