= Pronothobranchius kiyawensis =

Conservation status
- Endangered (IUCN 3.1)

Scientific classification
- Kingdom: Animalia
- Phylum: Chordata
- Class: Actinopterygii
- Order: Cyprinodontiformes
- Family: Nothobranchiidae
- Genus: Pronothobranchius
- Species: P. kiyawensis

Binomial name
- Pronothobranchius kiyawensis (Ahl, 1928)

Synonyms
- Nothobranchius kiyawensis Ahl, 1928

Species of fish

Pronothobranchius kiyawensis is a species of killifish from the family Nothobranchiidae which is native to western Africa where it occurs in the drainage basin of Lake Chad.

It has no fishing interest for food, but it is a species used in aquarium with some commercial importance, although it is difficult to maintain in an aquarium. With an elongated, silvery body, the male has a maximum length of only about 4.5 cm.

They live in fresh waters, with benthopelagic and non-migratory behavior, preferring waters with a temperature between 22 and 26 °C.

It is common to find it in streams and temporary swamps. This, together with the deforestation and channeling of these waters for irrigation in its distribution area, means that there is a certain risk for the species and it is considered "almost threatened.
