= Ouachita madtom =

Conservation status
- Endangered (IUCN 3.1)

Scientific classification
- Kingdom: Animalia
- Phylum: Chordata
- Class: Actinopterygii
- Division: Teleostei
- Order: Siluriformes
- Family: Ictaluridae
- Genus: Noturus
- Species: N. lachneri

Binomial name
- Noturus lachneri W. R. Taylor, 1969
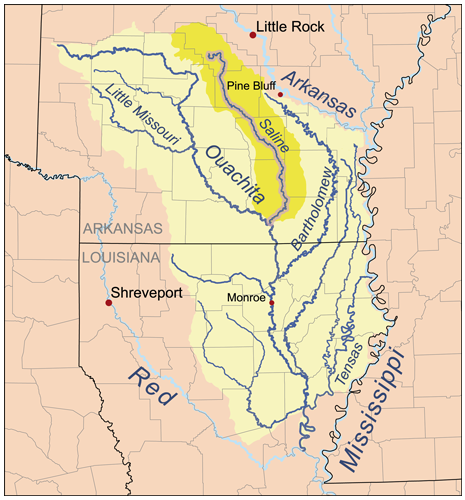
- The upper Saline River (drainage basin in dark yellow) and a few small tributaries of the Ouachita River are the only known water systems Ouachita madom is found in.

Species of fish

The Ouachita madtom (Noturus lachneri) is a catfish of the family Ictaluridae. The first specimens of the species were collected in 1952, but it was not until 1969 that they were formally described as a species. The Ouachita madtom is similar to the tadpole madtom (N. gyrinus) except the it has one internasal pore while the tadpole madtom has two, and 16 to 18 anal rays while the tadpole madtom has only 14 to 16. The Ouachita madtom is also similar to the slender madtom (N. exilis) but differing in the lack of serrae on the pectoral spine, having more caudal rays, and usually eight pectoral rays while the slender madtom has 9. The maximum length of an Ouachita madtom is about 4 inches (10 cm).

== Distribution and habitat ==
The Ouachita madtom is found only in the upper forks of the Saline River (Ouachita River) system and in one tributary of the Ouachita River in Central Arkansas, United States. A usual inhabitant of clear, small to medium, gravel-bottomed streams, the Ouachita madtom has been found in extremely shallow areas of the Saline River. It also is found in quiet backwaters under large rocks.

== Reproduction ==
Little is known about the Ouachita madtom's reproduction. However, on August 1, 1980, six Ouachita madtoms were collected in a stream only 3.9 feet (1.2 m) across. The six specimens were obviously young-of-the-year, and their presence raised speculation that Ouachita madtoms seek smaller streams during summer months to spawn.

== Known food sources ==
The Ouachia madtom starts feeding around 20 to 90 minutes after sunset. The following are known sources of food:

- Ephemeropterans
- Dipterans
- Coleopterans
- Trichopterans
- Isopods
- Copepods
- Gastropods

== Conservation ==
The Ouachita madtom was considered an Endangered Species by the IUCN in 1986 and 1988. Assessments in 1990 and 1994 showed it to be vulnerable, but it was again listed as endangered in 2010. Threats include Impoundment of water supplies, commercial gravel operations, Channelization, and changes to stream sediment load from clear cutting.

The Ouachita madtom is considered a species of greatest conservation need by the Arkansas Game and Fish Commission. The penalties for any form of trafficking or taking of Ouachita madtoms can be as serious as a $500,000 USD fine, 1 year imprisonment, or both. In addition to the penalties listed, civil penalties may be up to US$25,000 in fines.

== See also ==
- Caddo madtom: related catfish also in the Ouachita River
