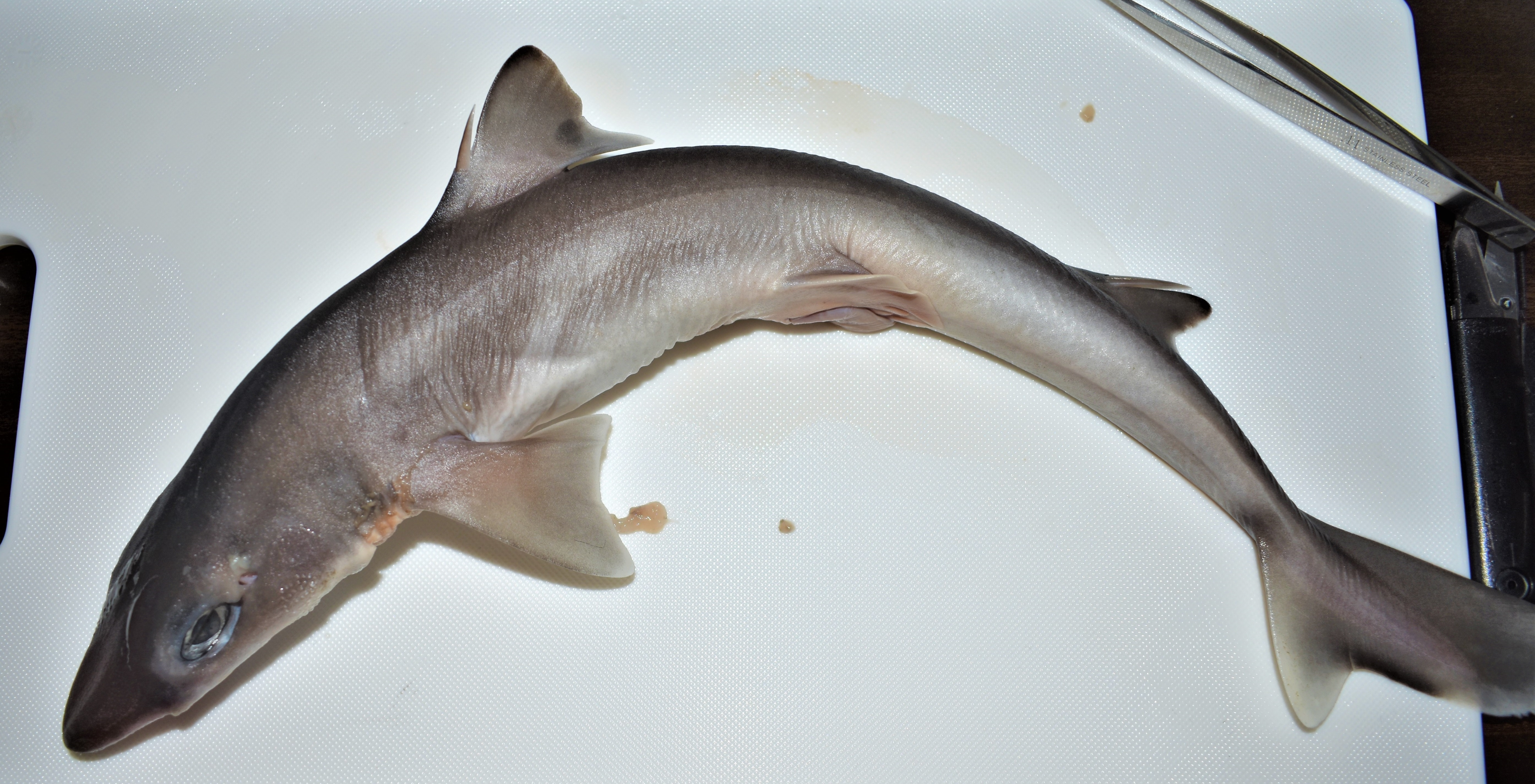

Conservation status
- Endangered (IUCN 3.1)

Scientific classification
- Kingdom: Animalia
- Phylum: Chordata
- Class: Chondrichthyes
- Subclass: Elasmobranchii
- Division: Selachii
- Order: Squaliformes
- Family: Squalidae
- Genus: Squalus
- Species: S. japonicus

Binomial name
- Squalus japonicus Ishikawa, 1908
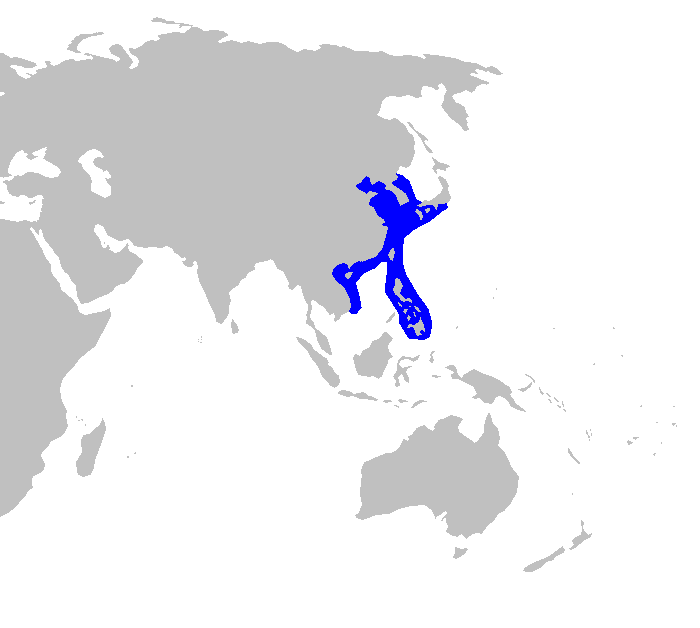
- Range of the Japanese spurdog (in blue)

= Japanese spurdog =

Species of shark

The Japanese spurdog (Squalus japonicus) is a dogfish, a member of the family Squalidae. It is found in the western Pacific Ocean, near southeastern Japan and in the East China Sea, including the Republic of Korea, the Philippines, and the Arafura Sea. It occurs in temperate and tropical waters along the continental shelf and slopes and primarily feeds on teleost fish and squid. It is caught as bycatch in commercial fishing, which has caused populations to decline.

== Description ==
Males measure 50 to 70 cm (19.7 to 27.6 in) long in adulthood, while females measure 56 to 80 cm (22 to 31.5 in) long. Females are also higher in weight than males. They have 25 to 27 teeth on their upper jaw and 20 to 24 teeth on their lower jaw.

== Distribution and habitat ==
The Japanese spurdog is found in the Pacific Ocean, in southeast Japan, China, North Korea, South Korea, and Taiwan. Additionally, there is one record of S. japonicus being caught in a trawl net in the Arafura Sea, between Australia and Western New Guinea. It is a demersal species, found on the continental shelf and upper slope at depths of 52 to 400 m (170.6 to 1312 ft).

== Reproduction ==
They are viviparous, giving birth to between 2 and 8 pups in each litter. The pups are 19 to 30 cm (7.5 to 11.8 in) long at birth. Gestation is 11 to 12 months and they reproduce annually. A study in the East China Sea found an equal sex ratio of both embryos and adults.

== Conservation ==
The Japanese spurdog is listed on the IUCN Red List as Endangered. Populations in Japan have been stable since 1983, but shark abundance elsewhere in its range has been in decline since the middle of the twentieth century. It is believed that S. japonicus abundance has declined in those areas as well.

Its major threat is commercial fishing. Though not a commercial product itself, it is caught as bycatch in demersal fishing and used for meat or fish meal.
