= Anamalai loach =

Conservation status
- Endangered (IUCN 3.1)

Scientific classification
- Kingdom: Animalia
- Phylum: Chordata
- Class: Actinopterygii
- Order: Cypriniformes
- Family: Balitoridae
- Genus: Ghatsa
- Species: G. montana

Binomial name
- Ghatsa montana (Herre, 1945)

Synonyms
- Homaloptera montana Herre, 1945

Species of fish

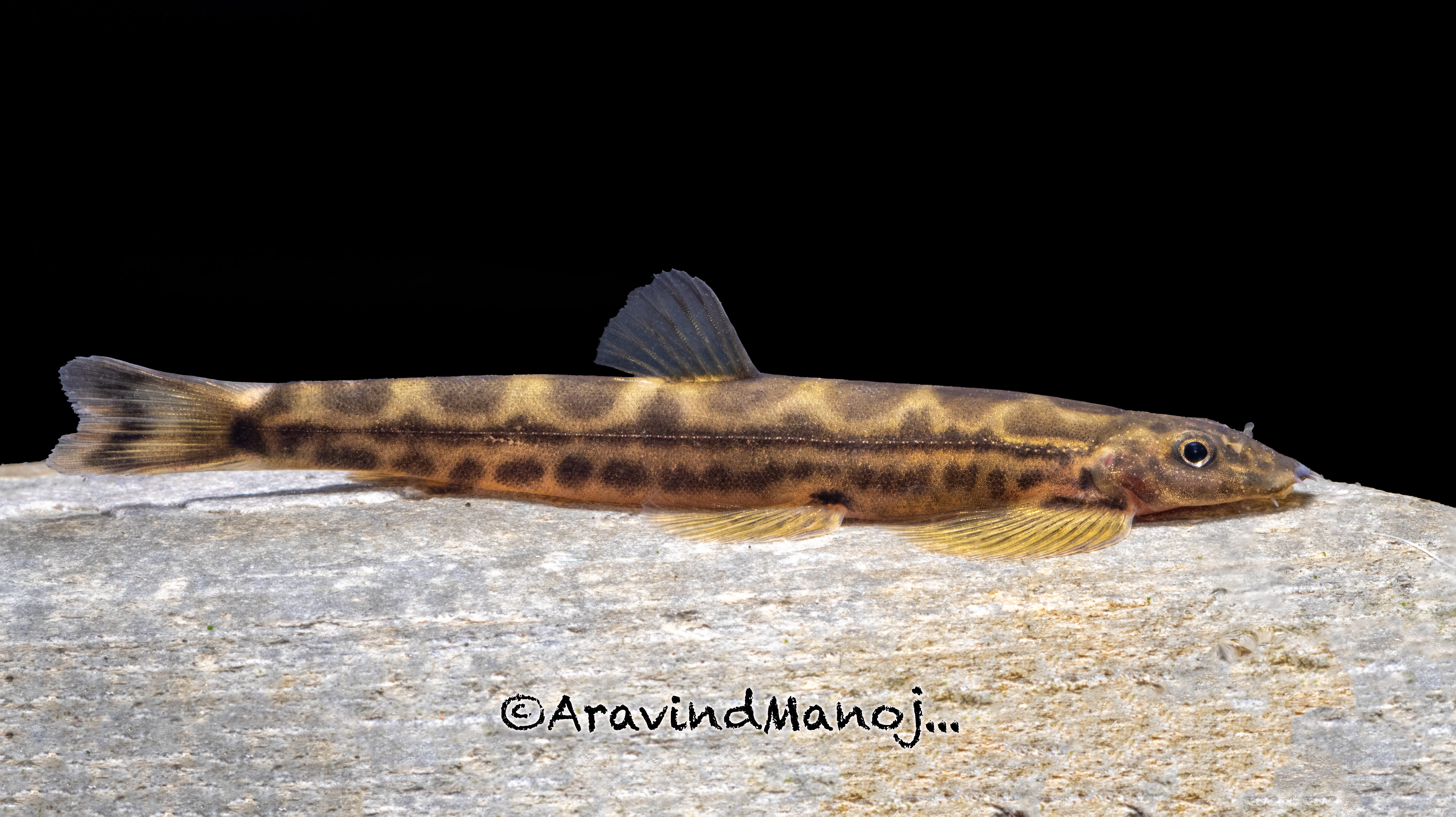
Ghatsa montana by AravindManoj...

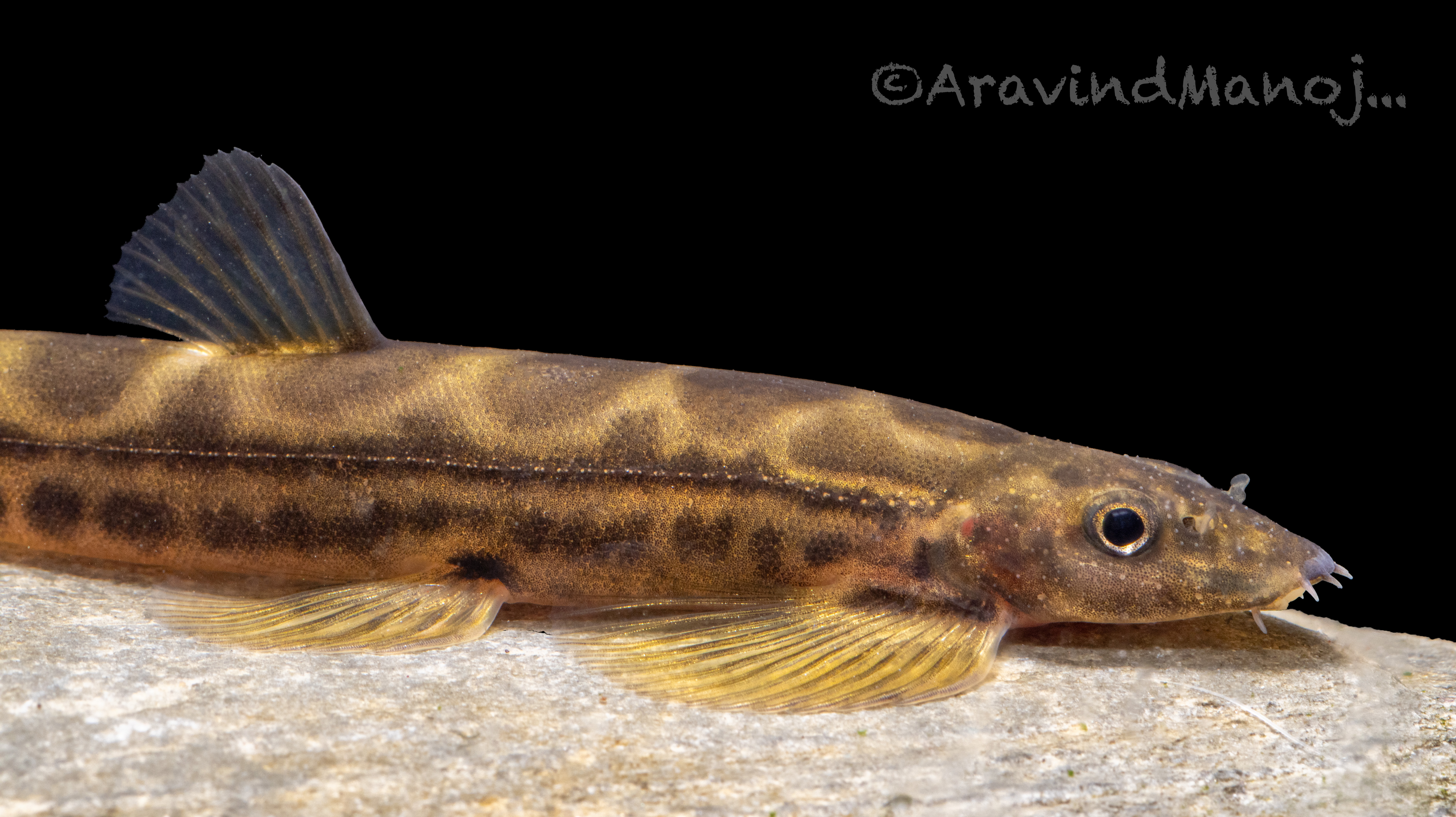

Ghatsa montana, the Anamalai loach, is a species of ray-finned fish in the genus Ghatsa.
