= Seub Nakhasathien =

Thai conservationist (1949–1990)

- สืบ นาคะเสถียร
- Born: Seubyos Nakhasathien; 31 December 1949; Prachinburi, Thailand
- Died: 1 September 1990 (aged 40); Huai Kha Khaeng Wildlife Sanctuary
- Cause of death: Suicide
- Education: Kasetsart University (BS, MS); University of London (MSc)
- Occupation: Conservationist
- Website: seub.or.th

Seub Nakhasathien (Thai: สืบ นาคะเสถียร, pronounced [sɯ̀ːp̚ nāː.kʰáʔ.sàʔ.tʰǐan], RTGS suep nakhasathian; 31 December 1949 – 1 September 1990) was a Thai conservationist, environmental activist, and scholar who is renowned for his effort to protect Cheow Lan Lake (Rajjaprabha Dam Reservoir), Thungyai Naresuan Wildlife Sanctuary, and Huai Kha Khaeng Wildlife Sanctuary. Seub committed suicide to signify the importance of the environment and to preserve it. According to the Bangkok Post, "The death of Seub Nakhasathien, a forest conservator who committed suicide in 1990,...helped transform the status of Thungyai Naresuan and the adjacent Huay Kha Kaeng Western Forest Complex into a sacrosanct site and inspired many youth to become forest patrol staff."

== Early years ==
Seub's birth name was "Seubyos". He was born in Tha Nga, Prachinburi Province, one of three children, to Salab Nakhasathien, a former governor of the province, and Boonyiem Nakhasathien. As a youth, Seub was serious and a good student. His family farmed, so he helped his mother on the farm when there was no school. When he was not helping his mother, he played with his friends and his favourite slingshot.

Seub's father had been a hunter. In their home were pictures of his father as a young man with a dead tiger trophy and a pair of antelope horns. When Seub was a teenager, he hunted birds. Seub was expert at making illegal guns and using them to shoot birds despite his love of nature. He once shot and killed a baby bird leaving the chick's mother bereft. Sometimes Seub and his brother were given wild animals such as lemurs and gibbons to care for; many of them died due to improper treatment. Seub quit hunting animals as he became more mature, when he was in grade 9 in high school. Seub later said, "We all have made mistakes."

Seub was a perfectionist. No matter how small the task, he was compelled to accomplish it flawlessly.

== Education ==
In 1959, after he finished Prathom 4 (grade 4 of primary school), he moved to attend St. Louise School (Chachoengsao) in Chachoengsao Province. He was not only a smart student, but he was also the best trumpet player at the school and an accomplished artist, drawing comic books for his friends to read. Because of his passion for the arts, Seub wanted to study architecture. But his university entrance examination result channelled him to the Faculty of Forestry at Kasetsart University, class of 35, from 1967 to 1971. Seub said that, at first, he did not want to study forestry—it was his fifth choice of major—but, when he got accepted, he told his mother that he should go, as he was not young anymore. His classmate and fourth year roommate at university said that Seub was a brilliant student, always sitting at the front of the class, taking notes that he illustrated with drawings. Seub was seen always reading books in the evening when his friends were partying and boisterous. Seub was serious about everything, even playing soccer; it was hard to get the ball through him and score. Seub was also an excellent swimmer and was on the university water polo team.

Seub did not attend his graduation ceremony. He claimed that he did not have enough knowledge to receive the certificate. After graduation (1973-1974), he briefly worked at the National Housing Authority of Thailand. Then, he continued graduate studies in silviculture. In 1979, he was awarded a British Council scholarship for a master's degree at London University to study resource and environmental conservation. In 1989, he was accepted to study for a Ph.D. at Cambridge University the United Kingdom but postponed that ambition when he was persuaded to accept the position of superintendent of the Huai Kha Khaeng Wildlife Sanctuary.

== Career ==
Seub conducted research on wild animals, especially birds, gorals, chamois, serows, and ecology at Huai Kha Khaeng and Thungyai Naresuan Wildlife Sanctuary. He also worked as a professor of biology at Kasetsart University.

=== Cheow Larn Wildlife Evacuation Project ===
In 1986, Seub was appointed as wildlife evacuation project leader for the Cheow Lan Dam project, with a budget of only 800,000 baht to evacuate a 100,000-acre (400 km^{2}) area.

The Rajjaprabha Dam Reservoir or Cheow Lan Dam, Thailand's thirteenth, was completed in 1987. The resulting flooding destroyed 185 square kilometres of the country's largest remaining area of lowland evergreen rain forest. For the first time ever in Thailand a rescue operation was carried out to try to save some of the wildlife, which included threatened and endangered species stranded on islands as the waters rose. Over 18 months 1,364 animals of 116 species were captured. Forty-four died soon after. The survivors were released into protected areas nearby.

Seub was able to save hundreds of animals, but was aware that many more were unable to escape and died. After what he saw as the failure of the Cheow Lan project, he fought against further logging and dam construction projects, such as the Nam Chon Dam. The state's plan to build the dam in the heart of Thungyai Naresuan's forest in the 1990s ignited the country's first environmental protest in which protesters won.

In 1988, Seub and his fellow conservationists took action against the Thai Plywood Co., Ltd., a state enterprise under the Ministry of Natural Resources and Environment over a logging concession in Huai Kha Khaeng Wildlife Sanctuary. In his argument, he said "the one who wanted logging business was the Royal Forest Department, and the one who wanted to conserve the forest was also the Royal Forest Department".

=== Thungyai Naresuan-Huai Kha Khaeng Wildlife Sanctuary ===
Seub Monument in Huai Kha Khaeng Wildlife Sanctuary

According to UNESCO,

Thung Yai-Huai Kha Khaeng Wildlife Sanctuary World Heritage property lies in Uthai Thani, Tak, and Kanchanaburi Provinces in the west of Thailand, along the border with Myanmar. The property combines two contiguous sanctuaries, Thung Yai Naresuan and Huai Kha Khang, separately established as sanctuaries in 1972 and 1974, respectively. Thung Yai-Huai Kha Khaeng Wildlife Sanctuary encompasses two important river systems, the Upper Khwae Yai and the Huai Khakhaeng. The property, encompassing 622,200 hectares, is the largest conservation area in Mainland Southeast Asia and is one of Thailand's least accessible and least disturbed forest areas.

Seub's vision was to solve the problems of the Huai Kha Khaeng. Rangers were sent in to patrol together with wildlife protection teams to ensure that animals would not be harmed and deforestation halted. The idea of "forest buffer zones" was implemented. Villages in the forest buffer area were mobilised as forest villages with their inhabitants supporting programs to stop hunting and deforestation. Villagers surrendered their firearms to officials as a sign of good faith and cooperation.

When Seub became superintendent of Huai Kha Khaeng Wildlife Sanctuary in 1990, he was asked to prepare a nomination to UNESCO for Thung Yai-Huai Kha Khaeng to become a Natural world Heritage Site. He, in turn, asked his campaigning colleague, Belinda Stewart-Cox, to help prepare the nomination since it had to be in English and he was too busy to focus on such a major undertaking. In mid–December 1991, approximately a year and a half after Seub's death, UNESCO certified Thungyai Naresuan-Huai Kha Khaeng Wildlife Sanctuary as a World Heritage Site, the first of its kind in mainland Southeast Asia.

== Suicide ==
In 1989, under pressure from many sides while he was working as head of the Huai Kha Khaeng Sanctuary, dealing with multiple problems including the non-payment of worker's wages, disagreements with higher-ups, the death of some employees at the hands of encroachers, Seub became despondent. Seub realised that the best way to fully conserve the sanctuary was to make it a UNESCO World Heritage site. After months of research, he and his colleague completed the nomination just weeks before he died. It was submitted to, and approved by, UNESCO after his death.

On 31 August 1990, Seub worked as usual. Later that day, he started to return things he had borrowed from others and had a meal with some of his companions. One of the people present was the last person to talk to Seub before his death.

The next day, at approximately 04:00, a gunshot was heard by a security guard. At Huai Kha Khaeng, the sound of gunshots was uncommon. Seub was not seen at breakfast. At 10:00 one of his colleagues went to his house and found his body on his bed surrounded by pieces of paper. On one was written, "I have the intention to end my life, no one was associated in this decision." signed by Seub.

== Recognition ==
=== Seub Nakhasathien Foundation ===
Seub Nakhasathien Foundation, Tiwanon Road

Seub's death jolted Thailand into action. Ten days after his cremation, on 10 September 1990, the Seub Nakhasathien Foundation was established. The foundation has received donations from The Queen Dowager Sirikit and Princess Soamsawali and thousands of others. Its goals are to protect natural sanctuaries and the flora and fauna inhabiting them and to protect endangered species.

=== Eponymous species ===
Oreoglanis nakasathiani

The Oreoglanis nakasathiani is one of the eight new kinds of genus Oreoglanis found in Chiang Dao Wildlife Sanctuary, Chiang Mai Province by Chavalit Vidthayanon, an expert in fresh-water fish, together with H.H. Ng and Passakorn Saenjundaeng. The fish was named in honour of Seub for his dedication to the wildlife and forests in Thailand.

=== Memorial day ===
The day of his death, 1 September, has become Seub Nakhasathien Day and every year, people gather at Huai Kha Khaeng to celebrate his life and remember his achievements.

=== In popular culture ===
- Nga Caravan composed a song Seub Nakhasathien (สืบ นาคะเสถียร) in memory of Seub.
- Aed Carabao composed a song Inherit the Spirit (สืบทอดเจตนา) as a memorial for Seub in his 1990 album No Problem (โนพลอมแพลม)
- Prapas Cholsaranon composed a song Matchstick and a Sunflower (ไม้ขีดไฟกับดอกทานตะวัน) in which the lyrics is about Seub, sung by Viyada Gomarnkul Na Nakorn
- Thai PBS created a documentary The Lights Never Gone (แสงไฟไม่เคยดับ) to commemorate Seub's greatness. It aired in August 2013.
- Phakpoom Wongpoom created a short film Raining in Huai Kha Khaeng (ฝนตกที่ห้วยขาแข้ง), one of the films in the series Royal Symphony; Songs in Our Heart (คีตราชนิพนธ์ บทเพลงในดวงใจราษฎร์), in 2015, starring Nopchai Chainam as Seub Nakhasathien.

== Works ==
Samples of Seub's research:

- Nakhasathien, S (1987b). "The discovery of Storm's stork (Ciconia stormi) in Thailand". Forktail (3): 43–49.
- Nakhasathien, S (1984). Plans for Forest Improvement and Management in the Khlong Saeng Watershed Area, Chiew Lam Project, Surat Thani Province (in Thai). Bangkok: Wildlife Conservation Division, Royal Forest Department.
- Nakhasathien, S (1987a). Report on the Wildlife Rescue Operation in the Reservoir of the Chiew Lam Dam, Surat Thani Province (in Thai). Bangkok: Wildlife Conservation Division, Royal Forest Department.
- Fea's Muntjac, an endangered species, and a discovery in Surat Thani Province
- Analysis of the hydroelectric power plant at the Upper Kwae Yai
- Nesting and egg laying of some bird species at Bang Phra Water Reservoir, Chonburi Province
- The last peat swamp forest in Thailand (Sirindhon Peat Swamp Forest), Narathiwat Province
- The importance of Thungyai Naresuan Wildlife Sanctuary and Nam Chon Dam building
