= Microsynodontis hirsuta =

Conservation status
- Data Deficient (IUCN 3.1)

Scientific classification
- Kingdom: Animalia
- Phylum: Chordata
- Class: Actinopterygii
- Order: Siluriformes
- Family: Mochokidae
- Genus: Microsynodontis
- Species: M. hirsuta

Binomial name
- Microsynodontis hirsuta H. H. Ng, 2004

Species of fish

Microsynodontis hirsuta is a species of upside-down catfish endemic to Gabon where it occurs in the Ntem River. It was first described in 2004 by Ng Heok Hee.

== Taxonomy ==
Before 2004, the genus Microsynodontis was believed to contain only four species, Microsynodontis batesii, M. christyi, M. lamberti, and M. polli. However, when examining previously collected specimens from the lower Guinea region that had been identified as M. batesii, Dr. Ng discovered that the specimens actually consisted of nine distinct species, eight of them previously undescribed. He published the descriptions of the new species in 2004. M. hirsuta is one of the new species that he described. Although the eight new species have been accepted by the scientific community, there is still some dispute among scientists as to whether the newly described species are actually separate species as the species are extremely difficult to tell apart.

== Description ==
M. hirsuta is a small fish, reaching a maximum standard length of 6.8 centimeters (2.7 in). The mouth of the fish faces downward, with broad lips containing papilla. The fish has three pairs of barbels. The maxillary barbels are on located on the upper jaw, and two pairs of mandibular barbels are on the lower jaw. The front edges of the dorsal fins and the pectoral fins are hardened into stiff spines that can be locked into place. The body shape is cylindrical along its entire length.

M. hirsuta can be distinguished from other members of the genus Microsynodontis by examining the dorsal spine, and the Tubercles on the head. The dorsal spine is straight, whereas all other species in the genus have gently curved spines. The tubercles on the head are larger than other species in the genus, with an average length of 0.3 millimeters (0.012 in), where other species in the genus of the same size have tubercles that average 0.05 millimeters (0.0020 in) in length. In addition, the adipose fin is longer than other members of the genus.
