= Microsynodontis nannoculus =

Conservation status
- Data Deficient (IUCN 3.1)

Scientific classification
- Domain: Eukaryota
- Kingdom: Animalia
- Phylum: Chordata
- Class: Actinopterygii
- Order: Siluriformes
- Family: Mochokidae
- Genus: Microsynodontis
- Species: M. nannoculus

Binomial name
- Microsynodontis nannoculus H. H. Ng, 2004

Species of fish

Microsynodontis nannoculus is a species of upside-down catfish endemic to Equatorial Guinea where it occurs in the Kyé River. It was first described in 2004 by Ng Heok Hee.

== Taxonomy ==
Before 2004, the genus Microsynodontis was believed to contain only four species, Microsynodontis batesii, M. christyi, M. lamberti, and M. polli. However, when examining previously collected specimens from the lower Guinea region that had been identified as M. batesii, Dr. Ng discovered that the specimens actually consisted of nine distinct species, eight of them previously undescribed. He published the descriptions of the new species in 2004. M. nannoculus is one of the new species that he described. Although the eight new species have been accepted by the scientific community, there is still some dispute among scientists as to whether the newly described species are actually separate species as the species are extremely difficult to tell apart.

== Description ==
M. nannoculus is a small fish, reaching a maximum standard length of 3.9 centimeters (1.5 in). The mouth of the fish faces downward, with broad lips containing papilla. The fish has three pairs of barbels. The maxillary barbels are on located on the upper jaw, and two pairs of mandibular barbels are on the lower jaw. The front edges of the dorsal fins and the pectoral fins are hardened into stiff spines that can be locked into place. The body shape is cylindrical along its entire length.

M. nannoculus can be distinguished from other members of the genus Microsynodontis by examining the size of the eye. The diameter of the eye is only about 10% to 12% of the standard length of the fish, whereas the diameter of the eye of all other species in the genus ranges from about 13% to 26%.
