= Microsynodontis emarginata =

Conservation status
- Data Deficient (IUCN 3.1)

Scientific classification
- Kingdom: Animalia
- Phylum: Chordata
- Class: Actinopterygii
- Order: Siluriformes
- Family: Mochokidae
- Genus: Microsynodontis
- Species: M. emarginata

Binomial name
- Microsynodontis emarginata H. H. Ng, 2004

Species of fish

Microsynodontis emarginata is a species of upside-down catfish endemic to Gabon where it occurs in the Ogowe River. It was first described in 2004 by Ng Heok Hee.

== Taxonomy ==
Before 2004, the genus Microsynodontis was believed to contain only four species, Microsynodontis batesii, M. christyi, M. lamberti, and M. polli. However, when examining previously collected specimens from the lower Guinea region that had been identified as M. batesii, Dr. Ng discovered that the specimens actually consisted of nine distinct species, eight of them previously undescribed. He published the descriptions of the new species in 2004. M. emarginata is one of the new species that he described. Although the eight new species have been accepted by the scientific community, there is still some dispute among scientists as to whether the newly described species are actually separate species as the species are extremely difficult to tell apart.

== Description ==
M. emarginata is a small fish, reaching a maximum standard length of 3.4 centimeters (1.3 in). The mouth of the fish faces downward, with broad lips containing papilla. The fish has three pairs of barbels. The maxillary barbels are on located on the upper jaw, and two pairs of mandibular barbels are on the lower jaw. The front edges of the dorsal fins and the pectoral fins are hardened into stiff spines that can be locked into place. The body shape is cylindrical along its entire length.

M. emarginata can be distinguished from other members of the genus Microsynodontis by examining the caudal fin. The fin is slightly forked or lobed, whereas all other members of the genus have caudal fins that are either rounded on the trailing edge or with a straight trailing edge.
