= Oreoglanis laciniosa =

Scientific classification
- Kingdom: Animalia
- Phylum: Chordata
- Class: Actinopterygii
- Order: Siluriformes
- Family: Sisoridae
- Genus: Oreoglanis
- Species: O. laciniosa

Binomial name
- Oreoglanis laciniosa Vidthayanon, Saenjundaeng & H. H. Ng, 2009

Fish species

Oreoglanis laciniosa is a species of catfish in the family Sisoridae, found in the Mae Sa Nga drainage, a tributary of the Salween River in western Thailand, which was discovered by Vidthayanon, Saenjundaeng and H.H. Ng in 2009.

== Size ==
This species reaches a length of 7.0 cm (2.8 in).

== Etymology ==
The fish's name is Latin for "indented" or "jagged", referring to the lobulate posterior margin of the lower lip.
