= Oreoglanis vicina =

Scientific classification
- Kingdom: Animalia
- Phylum: Chordata
- Class: Actinopterygii
- Order: Siluriformes
- Family: Sisoridae
- Genus: Oreoglanis
- Species: O. vicina

Binomial name
- Oreoglanis vicina Vidthayanon, Saenjundaeng & H. H. Ng, 2009

Fish species

Oreoglanis vicina is a species of catfish in the family Sisoridae. It is found in the upper reaches of the Nan River drainage, a tributary of the Chao Phraya River in northern Thailand, where it was first discovered by Vidthayanon, Saenjundaeng and H.H. Ng in 2009.

== Size ==
This species reaches a length of 8.1 cm (3.2 in).

== Etymology ==
The fish['s name is Latin for "neighboring", referring to the close proximity of distribution it shares with Oreoglanis. colurus and Oreoglanis. tenuicauda.
