= Oreoglanis suraswadii =

Scientific classification
- Kingdom: Animalia
- Phylum: Chordata
- Class: Actinopterygii
- Order: Siluriformes
- Family: Sisoridae
- Genus: Oreoglanis
- Species: O. suraswadii

Binomial name
- Oreoglanis suraswadii Vidthayanon, Saenjundaeng & H. H. Ng, 2009

Fish species

Oreoglanis suraswadii is a species of catfish in the family Sisoridae, found in the Nam Ruak River drainage, a western tributary of the Mekong River in northern Thailand. It was discovered by Vidthayanon, Saenjundaeng and H.H. Ng in 2009.

== Size ==
This species reaches a length of 7.3 cm (2.9 in).

== Etymology ==
The fish is named in honor of Plodprasop Suraswadi (b. 1945), the former director general of the Department of Fisheries in Thailand, who initiated the fisheries development and conservation program at the type locality, the Doi Tung Royal Project Area, Chiang Rai province, Thailand.
