= Oreoglanis sudarai =

Scientific classification
- Kingdom: Animalia
- Phylum: Chordata
- Class: Actinopterygii
- Order: Siluriformes
- Family: Sisoridae
- Genus: Oreoglanis
- Species: O. sudarai

Binomial name
- Oreoglanis sudarai Vidthayanon, Saenjundaeng & H. H. Ng, 2009

Fish species

Oreoglanis sudarai is a species of catfish in the family Sisoridae found in the upper reaches of the Ping River drainage, itself a tributary of the Chao Phraya River in northern Thailand. The species was discovered by Vidthayanon, Saenjundaeng and H.H. Ng in 2009.

== Size ==
This species reaches a length of 11.3 cm (4.4 in).

== Etymology ==
The fish is named in honor of Surapol Sudara (1939–2003), a Thai marine biologist who was prominent in raising awareness of the conservation of aquatic environments in Thailand.
