= Microsynodontis nasutus =

Conservation status
- Data Deficient (IUCN 3.1)

Scientific classification
- Kingdom: Animalia
- Phylum: Chordata
- Class: Actinopterygii
- Order: Siluriformes
- Family: Mochokidae
- Genus: Microsynodontis
- Species: M. nasutus

Binomial name
- Microsynodontis nasutus H. H. Ng , 2004

Species of fish

Microsynodontis nasutus is a species of upside-down catfish endemic to Gabon where it occurs in the Ogowe River. It was first described in 2004 by Ng Heok Hee.

The genus Microsynodontis is restricted to the rivers of western Africa (from the Saint Paul River drainage south and east to the Congo River drainage), and comprises small mochokid catfishes diagnosed by the following synapomorphies: a narrow mesethmoid, lack of free orbital margin, transverse ventral fold of branchiostegal membranes, slender cleithral process, and a rounded or truncate caudal fin (Howes, 1980).

== Taxonomy ==
Before 2004, the genus Microsynodontis was believed to contain only four species, Microsynodontis batesii, M. christyi, M. lamberti, and M. polli. However, when examining previously collected specimens from the lower Guinea region that had been identified as M. batesii, Dr. Ng discovered that the specimens actually consisted of nine distinct species, eight of them previously undescribed. He published the descriptions of the new species in 2004. M. nasutus is one of the new species that he described. Although the eight new species have been accepted by the scientific community, there is still some dispute among scientists as to whether the newly described species are actually separate species as the species are extremely difficult to tell apart.

== Description ==
M. nasutus is a small fish, reaching a maximum standard length of 3.7 centimeters (1.5 in). The mouth of the fish faces downward, with broad lips containing papilla. The fish has three pairs of barbels. The maxillary barbels are on located on the upper jaw, and two pairs of mandibular barbels are on the lower jaw. The front edges of the dorsal fins and the pectoral fins are hardened into stiff spines that can be locked into place. The body shape is cylindrical along its entire length.

M. nasutus can be distinguished from other members of the genus Microsynodontis by examining the length of the snout. In M. nasutus, the snout is longer, with a length of about 50% to 53% of the standard length of the fish, whereas other species in the genus have shorter snouts, ranging from about 36% to 50% of the standard length.

Personal profile gently convex; postdorsal body sloping gently ventrally. Preanal profile horizontal. Anus and urogenital openings located at vertical through middle of pelvic fin. Skin smooth. Lateral line complete and midlateral. Mouth inferior and crescent-shaped lips plicate. Oral teeth in rows on all tooth-bearing surfaces. Premaxillae narrow, with narrow ventral shelf and partially exposed when mouth closed. Primary teeth 13–14, conical and separated from secondary teeth by distinct gap
