= Oreoglanis hypsiura =

Scientific classification
- Kingdom: Animalia
- Phylum: Chordata
- Class: Actinopterygii
- Order: Siluriformes
- Family: Sisoridae
- Genus: Oreoglanis
- Species: O. hypsiura

Binomial name
- Oreoglanis hypsiura H. H. Ng & Kottelat, 1999

Fish species

Oreoglanis hypsiura is a species of catfish in the family Sisoridae, found in the Mekong basin in Laos.

== Size ==
This species reaches a length of 13.8 cm (5.4 in).

== Etymology ==
The fish's name means "high-tailed", from hypsēlós (Gr. ὑψηλός), "high", and ourá (Gr. οὐρά), "tail", referring to its relatively deeper caudal peduncle compared to Oreoglanis delacouri.
