= Oreoglanis heteropogon =

Scientific classification
- Kingdom: Animalia
- Phylum: Chordata
- Class: Actinopterygii
- Order: Siluriformes
- Family: Sisoridae
- Genus: Oreoglanis
- Species: O. heteropogon

Binomial name
- Oreoglanis heteropogon Vidthayanon, Saenjundaeng & H. H. Ng, 2009

Fish species

Oreoglanis heteropogon is a species of catfish in the family Sisoridae found in the Salween River drainage in western Thailand, which was discovered by Vidthayanon, Saenjundaeng and H.H. Ng in 2009.

== Size ==
This species reaches a length of 7.0 cm (2.8 in).

== Etymology ==
The fish's name derives from héteros (Gr. ἕτερος), "different"; pṓgōn (Gr. πώγων), "beard", as it is the only known similar fish from the Salween River drainage bearing a maxillary barbel with a pointed tip.
