= Oreoglanis colurus =

Scientific classification
- Kingdom: Animalia
- Phylum: Chordata
- Class: Actinopterygii
- Order: Siluriformes
- Family: Sisoridae
- Genus: Oreoglanis
- Species: O. colurus

Binomial name
- Oreoglanis colurus Vidthayanon, Saenjundaeng & H. H. Ng, 2009

Fish species

Oreoglanis colurus is a species of catfish in the family Sisoridae, found in the upper reaches of the Nan River drainage, itself a tributary of the Chao Phraya River in northern Thailand, which was discovered by Vidthayanon, Saenjundaeng and H.H. Ng in 2009.

== Size ==
This species reaches a length of 6.2 cm (2.4 in).

== Etymology ==
The fish's name derives from kólouros (Gr. κόλουρος), "bob-" or "stump-tailed", referring to its short caudal peduncle.
