= Microsynodontis vigilis =

Conservation status
- Data Deficient (IUCN 3.1)

Scientific classification
- Kingdom: Animalia
- Phylum: Chordata
- Class: Actinopterygii
- Order: Siluriformes
- Family: Mochokidae
- Genus: Microsynodontis
- Species: M. vigilis

Binomial name
- Microsynodontis vigilis H. H. Ng, 2004

Species of fish

Microsynodontis vigilis is a species of upside-down catfish endemic to Gabon where it occurs in the Ogowe River. It was first described in 2004 by Ng Heok Hee.

== Taxonomy ==
Before 2004, the genus Microsynodontis was believed to contain only four species, Microsynodontis batesii, M. christyi, M. lamberti, and M. polli. However, when examining previously collected specimens from the lower Guinea region that had been identified as M. batesii, Dr. Ng discovered that the specimens actually consisted of nine distinct species, eight of them previously undescribed. He published the descriptions of the new species in 2004. M. vigilis is one of the new species that he described. Although the eight new species have been accepted by the scientific community, there is still some dispute among scientists as to whether the newly described species are actually separate species as the species are extremely difficult to tell apart.

== Description ==
M. vigilis is a small fish, reaching a maximum standard length of 6.2 centimeters (2.4 in). The mouth of the fish faces downward, with broad lips containing papilla. The fish has three pairs of barbels. The maxillary barbels are on located on the upper jaw, and two pairs of mandibular barbels are on the lower jaw. The front edges of the dorsal fins and the pectoral fins are hardened into stiff spines that can be locked into place. The body shape is cylindrical along its entire length.

M. vigilis can be distinguished from other members of the genus Microsynodontis by examining the length of the adipose fin, the size of the eye, the shape of the pectoral spine, and the shape of the caudal fin. The length of the adipose fin is shorter than most species, and has a larger eye than most species. In addition, the leading edge of the pectoral spine is smooth, instead of serrated, and the trailing edge of the caudal fin is rounded.
