= Oreoglanis tenuicauda =

Scientific classification
- Kingdom: Animalia
- Phylum: Chordata
- Class: Actinopterygii
- Order: Siluriformes
- Family: Sisoridae
- Genus: Oreoglanis
- Species: O. tenuicauda

Binomial name
- Oreoglanis tenuicauda Vidthayanon, Saenjundaeng & H. H. Ng, 2009

Fish species

Oreoglanis tenuicauda is a species of catfish in the family Sisoridae, only known from the type locality in the upper reaches of the Nan River drainage, itself a tributary of the Chao Phraya River in northern Thailand, which was discovered by Vidthayanon, Saenjundaeng and H.H. Ng in 2009.

== Size ==
This species reaches a length of 9.0 cm (3.5 in).

== Etymology ==
The fish's name derives from tenuis, Latin for "thin" or "slender"; cauda (L.), "tail", referring to the more slender appearance of the caudal peduncle compared with its congeners in the Nan River drainage of Thailand.
