= Microsynodontis laevigata =

Conservation status
- Data Deficient (IUCN 3.1)

Scientific classification
- Kingdom: Animalia
- Phylum: Chordata
- Class: Actinopterygii
- Order: Siluriformes
- Family: Mochokidae
- Genus: Microsynodontis
- Species: M. laevigata

Binomial name
- Microsynodontis laevigata H. H. Ng, 2004

Species of fish

Microsynodontis laevigata is a species of upside-down catfish endemic to Gabon where it is found in the Ivindo River. It was first described in 2004 by Ng Heok Hee.

== Taxonomy ==
Before 2004, the genus Microsynodontis was believed to include only four species: Microsynodontis batesii, M. christyi, M. lamberti, and M. polli. However, when examining previously collected specimens from the lower Guinea region that had been identified as M. batesii, Dr. Ng discovered that the specimens actually consisted of nine distinct species, eight of them previously undescribed. He published the descriptions of the new species in 2004, including M. laevigata as one of them. Although the eight new species have been accepted by the scientific community, some scientists continue to question whether they are truly distinct, as the species are extremely difficult to differentiate.

== Description ==
M. laevigata is a small fish, reaching a maximum standard length of 3.1 centimeters (1.2 in). The mouth of the fish faces downward, with broad lips containing papilla. The fish has three pairs of barbels. The maxillary barbels are on located on the upper jaw, and two pairs of mandibular barbels are on the lower jaw. The front edges of the dorsal fins and the pectoral fins are hardened into stiff spines that can be locked into place. The body shape is cylindrical along its entire length.

M. laevigata can be distinguished from other members of the genus Microsynodontis by the structure of the pectoral spine, the shape of the caudal fin, and the length of the adipose fin. When viewed from above, the front edges of the pectoral spines appear smooth rather than serrated. The trailing edge of the caudal fin is straight, instead of forked or rounded. Only M. lamberti shares those characteristics. M. laevigata differs from M. lamberti by having an adipose fin that is about 33% to 35% of the standard length of the fish, instead of about 25% to 31% of the standard length.
