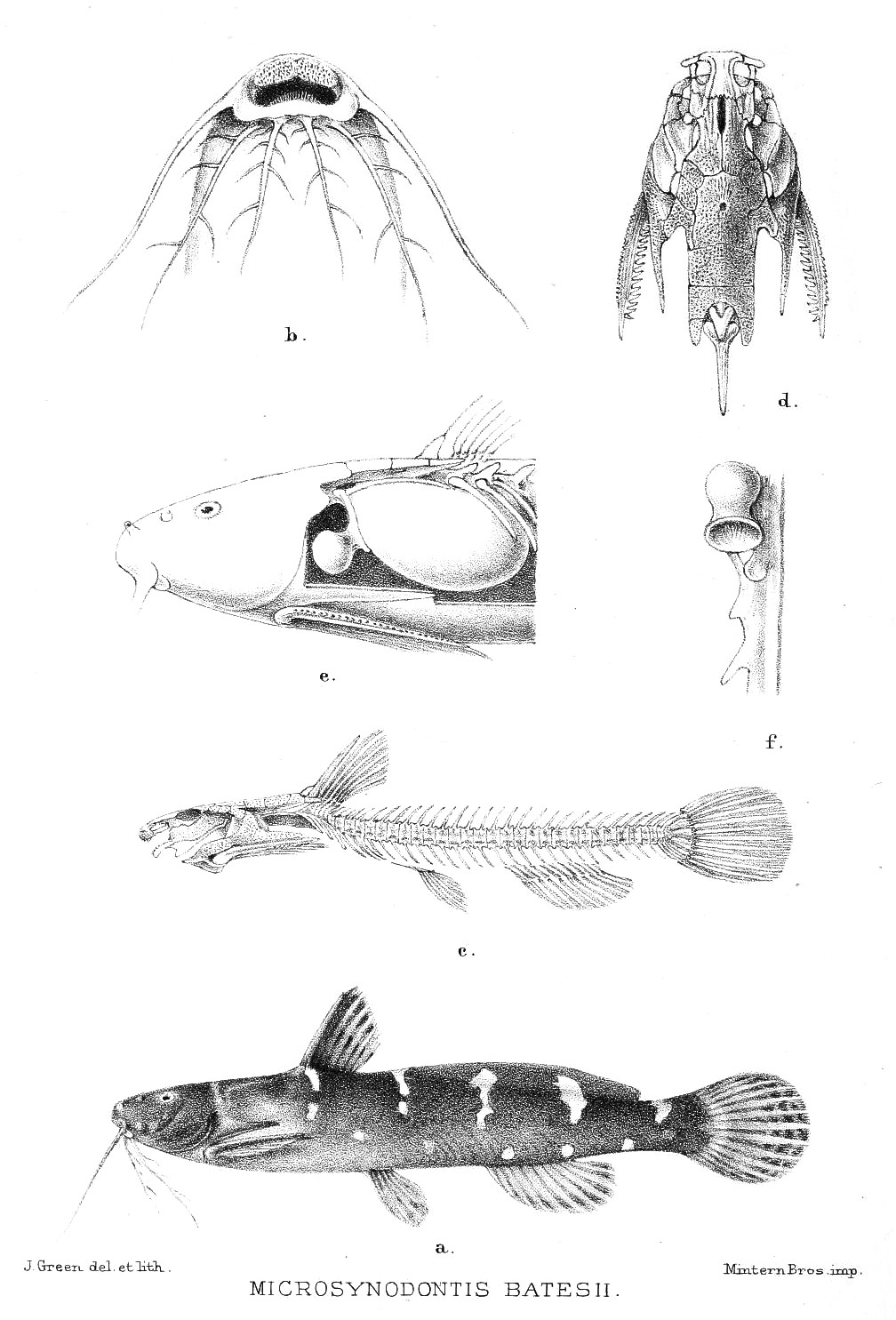
- Microsynodontis batesii

Scientific classification
- Kingdom: Animalia
- Phylum: Chordata
- Class: Actinopterygii
- Order: Siluriformes
- Family: Mochokidae
- Genus: Microsynodontis; Boulenger, 1903

Type species
- Microsynodontis batesii Boulenger, 1903

Species
- See text.

= Microsynodontis =

Genus of fishes

Microsynodontis is a genus of upside-down catfishes native to freshwater rivers in western Africa. The genus was originally described by British-Belgian zoologist George Albert Boulenger in 1903 based upon the type species Microsynodontis batesii. The name microsynodontis comes from the Greek word mikro, meaning small, and the Greek term synodon, meaning "with the teeth all growing together".

== Description ==
Species in Microsynodontis are small, reaching a maximum standard length of 10 centimetres (3.9 in). The mouth of the fish faces downward, with broad lips containing papilla. The body shape is cylindrical along its entire length.

Little is known about the life cycle or biology of Microsynodontis. Identifying an individual fish's species within the genus of Microsynodontis can be difficult, but some diagnostic methods have been identifying, including the identification of the color and color patterns, the shape and size of the fins, the shape and size of the snout, the characteristics of the spines of the fish, and the characteristics of the tubercles, which are small, rounded protrusions on the skin of the fish. The number of teeth in an individual has not been demonstrated to be useful in identifying the species in this genus, unlike in other genera of the Mochokidae.

Microsynodontis species express sexual dimorphism. Males can be distinguished by the presence of a conical genital papilla immediately posterior to the anus; in females, this papilla is smaller and has a flattened tip. Males also have a much denser aggregation of tubercles on the head. In M. hirsutus these tubercles are longer than in the other species.

Microsynodontis species are occasionally imported for the aquarium trade.

== Species ==
There are currently 12 recognized species in this genus:

- Microsynodontis armatus H. H. Ng, 2004
- Microsynodontis batesii Boulenger, 1903
- Microsynodontis christyi Boulenger, 1920
- Microsynodontis emarginata H. H. Ng, 2004
- Microsynodontis hirsuta H. H. Ng, 2004
- Microsynodontis laevigata H. H. Ng, 2004
- Microsynodontis lamberti Poll & Gosse, 1963
- Microsynodontis nannoculus H. H. Ng, 2004
- Microsynodontis nasutus H. H. Ng, 2004
- Microsynodontis notata H. H. Ng, 2004
- Microsynodontis polli Lambert, 1958
- Microsynodontis vigilis H. H. Ng, 2004
