= Microsynodontis notata =

Conservation status
- Data Deficient (IUCN 3.1)

Scientific classification
- Kingdom: Animalia
- Phylum: Chordata
- Class: Actinopterygii
- Order: Siluriformes
- Family: Mochokidae
- Genus: Microsynodontis
- Species: M. notata

Binomial name
- Microsynodontis notata H. H. Ng, 2004

Species of fish

Microsynodontis notata is a species of upside-down catfish endemic to Gabon where it occurs in the Ogowe River. It was first described in 2004 by Ng Heok Hee.

== Taxonomy ==
Before 2004, the genus Microsynodontis was believed to contain only four species, Microsynodontis batesii, M. christyi, M. lamberti, and M. polli. However, when examining previously collected specimens from the lower Guinea region that had been identified as M. batesii, Dr. Ng discovered that the specimens actually consisted of nine distinct species, eight of them previously undescribed. He published the descriptions of the new species in 2004. M. notata is one of the new species that he described. Although the eight new species have been accepted by the scientific community, there is still some dispute among scientists as to whether the newly described species are actually separate species as the species are extremely difficult to tell apart.

== Description ==
M. notata is a small fish, reaching a maximum standard length of 5.4 centimeters (2.1 in). The mouth of the fish faces downward, with broad lips containing papilla. The fish has three pairs of barbels. The maxillary barbels are on located on the upper jaw, and two pairs of mandibular barbels are on the lower jaw. The front edges of the dorsal fins and the pectoral fins are hardened into stiff spines that can be locked into place. The body shape is cylindrical along its entire length.

M. notata can be distinguished from other members of the genus Microsynodontis by examining the pectoral spine, the length of the caudal peduncle, the size of the eye, the shape of the caudal fin, and the colors on the body. The caudal peduncle is long, making up about 10% to 12% of the standard length of the fish, whereas all other members of the genus, with the exception of M. christyi and M. laevigatus, have a shorter caudal peduncle, making up about 6% to 10% of the standard length. M. notata can be distinguished M. christyi by measuring the size of the eye; M. notata has an eye that is about 17% to 26% of the standard length, whereas M. christyi has an eye that is about 14% to 18% of the standard length. M. notata can be distinguished from M. laevigatus by the serrated, rather than smooth, leading edge of the pectoral fin spines. It also has a rounded, instead of straight, trailing edge of the caudal fin. M. notata has numerous faint, dark brown spots present on the body, where other members of the genus do not show spots.
