= Oreoglanis nakasathiani =

Scientific classification
- Kingdom: Animalia
- Phylum: Chordata
- Class: Actinopterygii
- Order: Siluriformes
- Family: Sisoridae
- Genus: Oreoglanis
- Species: O. nakasathiani

Binomial name
- Oreoglanis nakasathiani Vidthayanon, Saenjundaeng & H. H. Ng, 2009

Fish species

Oreoglanis nakasathiani is a species of fish in the family Sisoridae found in the upper reaches of the Ping River drainage, itself a tributary of the Chao Phraya River in northern Thailand, which was described by Vidthayanon, Saenjundaeng and H.H. Ng in 2009.

== Size ==
This species reaches a length of 11.93 cm (4.70 in).

== Etymology ==
The fish is named in honor of the late Seub Nakhasathien, a wildlife biologist who devoted his life to research and awareness leading to the conservation and management of the Western Forest Complex in Thailand.
