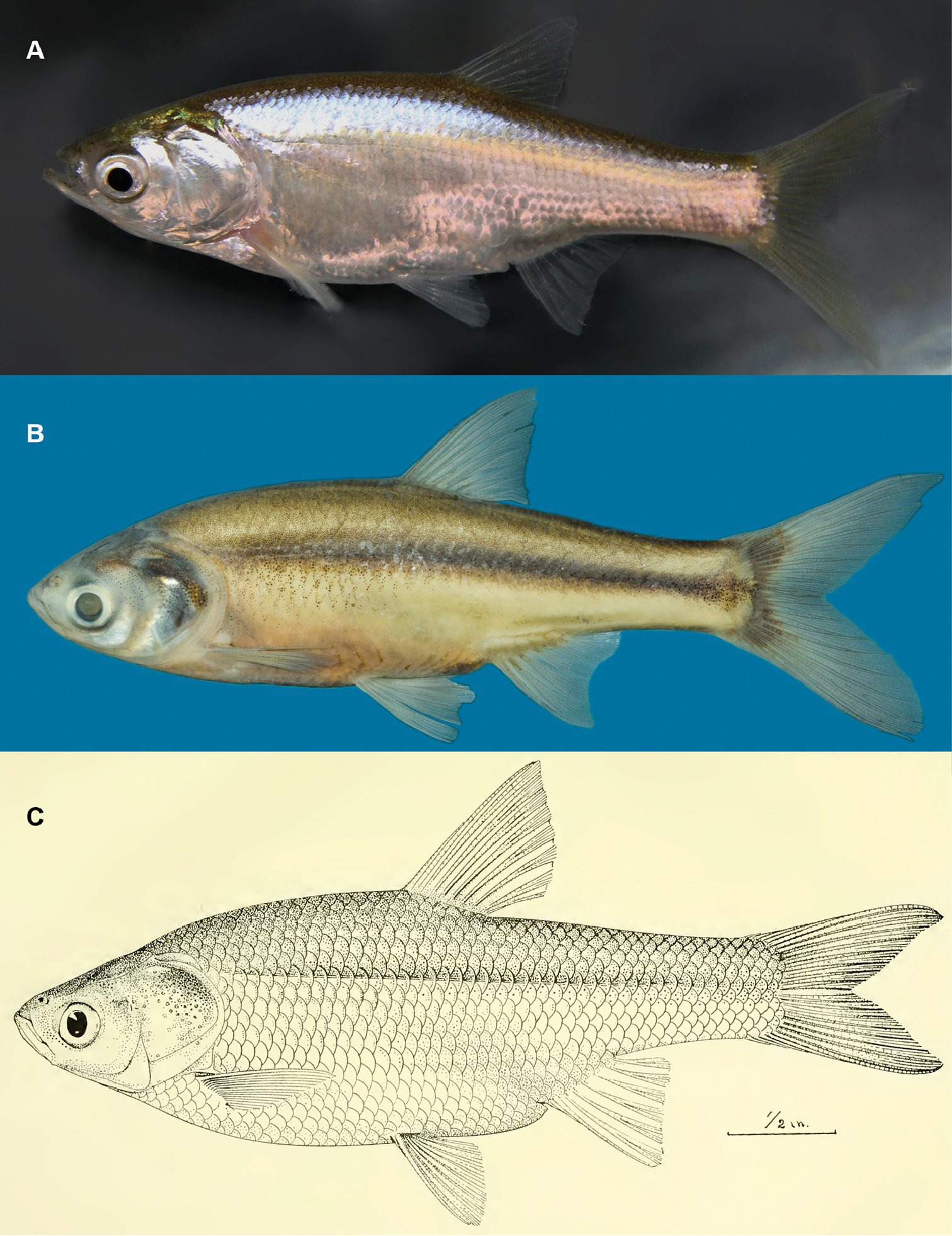
- Amblypharyngodon grandisquamis, A in aquarium (~70 mm SL, not collected), Sri Lanka, Ulhitiya, Mahaweli River basin B in preservation (DZ 3193A, 74.0 mm SL), Sri Lanka, Polonnaruwa, Mahaweli River basin C illustration of the holotype of A. grandisquamis by Jordan and Starks (1917: pl. XLIV, FMNH 58964).

Conservation status
- Least Concern (IUCN 3.1)

Scientific classification
- Kingdom: Animalia
- Phylum: Chordata
- Class: Actinopterygii
- Order: Cypriniformes
- Family: Danionidae
- Genus: Amblypharyngodon
- Species: A. grandisquamis

Binomial name
- Amblypharyngodon grandisquamis D. S. Jordan & Starks, 1917

= Amblypharyngodon grandisquamis =

Species of fish

Amblypharyngodon grandisquamis, the Sri Lanka silver carplet, is a species of freshwater ray-finned fish belonging to the family Danionidae, the danios or danionins. This species is endemic to Sri Lanka. This taxon was previously considered to be a synonym of A. melettinus but is now considered to be a valid species, differing from A. melettinus both morphologically and genetically. It is the only species in the genus Amblypharyngodon found in Sri Lanka where it occurs in the lowland floodplains in both the wet and dry zones.Here it shows a preferenece for slow moving and still waters in canals, rivers, reservoirs and marshes, up to 460 m (1,510 ft) above sea level. This species is slow moving and is typically observed in large schools near the surface of the water. During the rainy season the adults are found in rice paddies, where they probably spawn.
