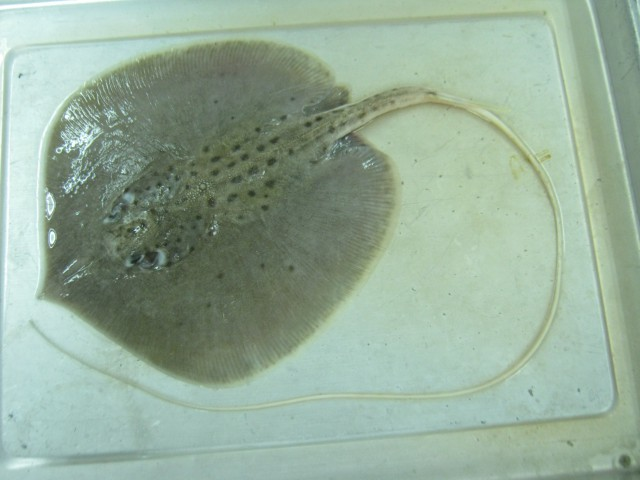

Conservation status
- Endangered (IUCN 3.1)

Scientific classification
- Kingdom: Animalia
- Phylum: Chordata
- Class: Chondrichthyes
- Subclass: Elasmobranchii
- Order: Myliobatiformes
- Family: Dasyatidae
- Genus: Fluvitrygon
- Species: F. signifer

Binomial name
- Fluvitrygon signifer Compagno & Roberts, 1982
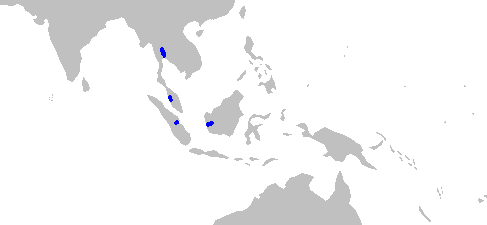
- Range of the white-edge freshwater whipray

Synonyms
- Himantura signifer

= White-edge freshwater whipray =

Species of cartilaginous fish

The white-edge freshwater whipray (Fluvitrygon signifer) is an extremely rare species of stingray in the family Dasyatidae, native to four river systems in Southeast Asia. Measuring up to 60 cm (24 in) across, this ray has an oval pectoral fin disc and a very long, whip-like tail without fin folds. It can be identified by the presence of a sharply delineated white band running around the margin of its otherwise brown disc, as well as by its white tail and a band of dermal denticles along the middle of its back. This species feeds on benthic invertebrates and is aplacental viviparous. Its two long tail spines are potentially dangerous to humans. The International Union for Conservation of Nature (IUCN) has assessed the white-edge freshwater whipray as Endangered, as it is under heavy pressure from fishing and habitat loss, degradation, and fragmentation.

== Taxonomy and phylogeny ==
The white-edge freshwater whipray was described by Leonard Compagno and Tyson Roberts in a 1982 issue of Environmental Biology of Fishes, with the specific epithet signifer (Latin for "sign-bearing") in reference to its distinctive coloration. The type specimen is an immature female 29 cm (11 in) across, collected from the mouth of the Sungai Ketungau off the Kapuas River in West Kalimantan, Indonesia. Other common names for this species include freshwater stingray, pale whipray, and white-rimmed stingray. Within its genus, the white-edge freshwater whipray most closely resembles Fluvitrygon kittipongi, described in 2005. A 1999 phylogenetic analysis, based on cytochrome b sequences, found that it is closely related to Maculabatis gerrardi and Brevitrygon imbricata, which form a sister species pair.

== Distribution and habitat ==
One of the few members of its family that seems to exclusively inhabit fresh water, the white-edge freshwater whipray is known from four Southeast Asian river systems: the Kapuas River in Borneo, the Indragiri River in Sumatra, the Perak River in Peninsular Malaysia, and the Chao Phraya River in Thailand. Although these rivers are now isolated from one another, when sea levels were low during the Pleistocene epoch (2.6 million to 12,000 years ago) they may have all been contiguous as part of the Central or North Sundaland drainage basin. At that time, this ray could have dispersed into its present range without having to enter salt water. This bottom-dwelling species favors a sandy habitat.

== Description ==
The white-edge freshwater whipray has a thin and oval pectoral fin disc slightly wider than long. The anterior margins of the disc converge with a broad angle at the tip of the snout, which is slightly protruding. The eyes are small and immediately followed by much larger spiracles. There is a flap of skin between the nares with a fringed, subtly concave or three-lobed posterior margin. The mouth is gently bow-shaped, with a groove running from the nasal flap around its corners. There are 38–45 upper tooth rows and 37–46 lower tooth rows; the teeth are well-spaced and arranged in a quincunx pattern. Each tooth has a blunt conical crown with a transverse cutting edge; this edge is higher and serrated in males and lower and blunt in females. There is a row of 4–5 papillae across the floor of the mouth: a large inner pair, a smaller outer pair, and sometimes a central one of varying size.

The tail is about 3.5 times as long as the disc and bears two stinging spines on top; behind the spines the tail becomes slender and whip-like, without any fin folds. Two recorded individuals had tail spines 86 and 87 mm (3.4 and 3.4 in) long with 70 and 89 serrations respectively. A band of skin running along the back from between the eyes to the tail base is roughened by small, flattened heart-shaped dermal denticles interspersed with small conical denticles. There are more denticles on the tail behind the spines, and small individuals also have a pearl spine in the center of the disc. The disc is brown above, with mottling in the center and on the tail base, a white spot between the eye and spiracle, and a sharp white band running around its periphery. The underside is completely white, as is the tail behind the spines. This ray grows up to 60 cm (24 in) across and perhaps over 2 m (6.6 ft) long.

== Biology and ecology ==
Like the other freshwater and euryhaline members of its family, but unlike the specialized South American river stingrays of the family Potamotrygonidae, the white-edge freshwater whipray retains the ability to synthesize urea for osmoregulation and can survive in brackish water with a salinity of 20 ppt for at least two weeks. Indeed, this ray might experience greater salinity-induced oxidative stress in freshwater than in brackish water, possibly related to its short history of freshwater invasion. To this end, it has been suggested that there may be a possible relationship between the successful invasion of the freshwater environment by some euryhaline marine elasmobranchs and the ability of these elasmobranchs to increase the capacity of ascorbic acid synthesis to defend against hyposalinity stress. In addition, the ampullae of Lorenzini of F. signifer are intermediate in size and structure between the large, complex ampullae of its marine relatives and the small, simple ampullae of potamotrygonid stingrays, which may be a consequence of varying salinities in its environment and demands that would place on electroreception. The white-edge freshwater whipray feeds mainly on small benthic organisms, including crustaceans, molluscs, and insect larvae. Reproduction is aplacental viviparous with the developing embryos sustained by maternally produced histotroph ("uterine milk"), as is the case in other stingrays. Newborns measure 10–12 cm (3.9–4.7 in) across; males and females mature sexually at 21–23 cm (8.3–9.1 in) and 25–26 cm (9.8–10.2 in) across respectively.

== Human interactions ==
The venomous stings of the white-edge freshwater whipray are capable of inflicting excruciating and even fatal wounds on humans. This species is extremely rare, with only about 10 specimens having been deposited in museum collections. Most of its range is subject to heavy fishing pressure; this ray is infrequently caught using fish traps, spears, and bottom-set lines; it is sold for meat and the aquarium trade. Habitat loss and degradation as a result of pollution, logging and dam construction are likely to pose an even a greater threat to the survival of this species. In Thailand, dams built on the Chao Phraya have fragmented the resident stingray population and effectively reduced its genetic diversity. Because of diverse threats faced by this ray and the lack of exchange between the different rivers it inhabits, the International Union for Conservation of Nature (IUCN) has assessed the white-edge freshwater whipray as Endangered. The Thai government began a captive breeding program for this and other endangered freshwater stingrays at Chai Nat during the 1990s, but by 1996 the program had been placed on hold.
