= Microsynodontis armatus =

Conservation status
- Data Deficient (IUCN 3.1)

Scientific classification
- Kingdom: Animalia
- Phylum: Chordata
- Class: Actinopterygii
- Order: Siluriformes
- Family: Mochokidae
- Genus: Microsynodontis
- Species: M. armatus

Binomial name
- Microsynodontis armatus H. H. Ng, 2004

Species of fish

Microsynodontis armatus is a species of upside-down catfish endemic to Gabon where it occurs in the Ivindo River. It was first described in 2004 by Ng Heok Hee.

== Taxonomy ==
Before 2004, the genus Microsynodontis was believed to contain only four species, Microsynodontis batesii, M. christyi, M. lamberti, and M. polli. However, when examining previously collected specimens from the lower Guinea region that had been identified as M. batesii, Dr. Ng discovered that the specimens actually consisted of nine distinct species, eight of them previously undescribed. He published the descriptions of the new species in 2004. M. armatus is one of the new species that he described. Although the eight new species have been accepted by the scientific community, there is still some dispute among scientists as to whether the newly described species are actually separate species as the species are extremely difficult to tell apart.

== Description ==
M. armatus is a small fish, reaching a maximum standard length of 2.7 centimeters (1.1 in). The mouth of the fish faces downward, with broad lips containing papilla. The fish has three pairs of barbels. The maxillary barbels are on located on the upper jaw, and two pairs of mandibular barbels are on the lower jaw. The front edges of the dorsal fins and the pectoral fins are hardened into stiff spines that can be locked into place. The body shape is cylindrical along its entire length.

M. armatus can be distinguished from other members of the genus Microsynodontis by examining the serrations on the pectoral fin spines. The leading edge of the spine is finely serrated, and the trailing edge is coarsely serrated. When examining the third of the leading edge of the fin spine that is closest to the body, the serrations angle inward toward the body instead of outward or straight ahead.
