= Oreoglanis insignis =

Scientific classification
- Kingdom: Animalia
- Phylum: Chordata
- Class: Actinopterygii
- Order: Siluriformes
- Family: Sisoridae
- Genus: Oreoglanis
- Species: O. insignis

Binomial name
- Oreoglanis insignis H. H. Ng & Rainboth, 2001

Fish species

Oreoglanis insignis is a species of catfish in the family Sisoridae, found in the upper Irrawaddy and Salween river drainages in northern Myanmar and southwestern China.

== Size ==
This species reaches a length of 8.4 cm (3.3 in).

== Etymology ==
The fish's name is Latin for "distinguished by marks", referring to the numerous pale-colored patches on its body.
