= Oreoglanis brevicula =

Scientific classification
- Kingdom: Animalia
- Phylum: Chordata
- Class: Actinopterygii
- Order: Siluriformes
- Family: Sisoridae
- Genus: Oreoglanis
- Species: O. brevicula

Binomial name
- Oreoglanis brevicula H. H. Ng & Kottelat, 2024

Fish species

Oreoglanis brevicula is a species of catfish in the family Sisoridae found in the Mekong basin in Laos.

== Size ==
This species reaches a length of 13.8 cm (5.4 in).

== Etymology ==
The fish's name derives from the Latin for "somewhat short", referring to its relatively short pectoral fin and the caudal peduncle, compared with many other congeners.
