= Tonlesapia =

Scientific classification
- Kingdom: Animalia
- Phylum: Chordata
- Class: Actinopterygii
- Order: Syngnathiformes
- Family: Callionymidae
- Genus: Tonlesapia; Motomura & Mukai, 2006

Type species
- Tonlesapia tsukawakii Motomura & Mukai, 2006

Genus of fishes

Tonlesapia is a genus of freshwater dragonets native to Southeast Asia.

== Species ==
There are currently two recognized species in this genus:

- Tonlesapia amnica H. H. Ng & Rainboth, 2011 (Mekong delta dragonet)
- Tonlesapia tsukawakii Motomura & Mukai, 2006
