= Oreoglanis setigera =

Scientific classification
- Kingdom: Animalia
- Phylum: Chordata
- Class: Actinopterygii
- Order: Siluriformes
- Family: Sisoridae
- Genus: Oreoglanis
- Species: O. setigera

Binomial name
- Oreoglanis setigera H. H. Ng & Rainboth, 2001

Fish species

Oreoglanis setigera is a species of catfish in the family Sisoridae, found in Laos and China.

== Size ==
This species reaches a length of 6.9 cm (2.7 in).

== Etymology ==
The fish's name derives from the Latin seta or saeta (L.), "hair" or "bristle"; -igera (L.), "to have or bear", i.e., "bristly", referring to the laciniate posterior margin of the maxillary barbels.
