= Oreoglanis macronemus =

Conservation status
- Data Deficient (IUCN 3.1)

Scientific classification
- Domain: Eukaryota
- Kingdom: Animalia
- Phylum: Chordata
- Class: Actinopterygii
- Order: Siluriformes
- Family: Sisoridae
- Genus: Oreoglanis
- Species: O. macronemus

Binomial name
- Oreoglanis macronemus H. H. Ng, 2004

Species of fish

Oreoglanis macronemus is a species of sisorid catfish. It is known only from four preserved specimens collected from the Xiangkhoang Plateau, northern Laos, by an expedition led by Jean Théodore Delacour in the mid-1920s and misidentified as Euchiloglanis sp. These specimens are in the Natural History Museum, London.

This is a very small catfish (the largest specimen, a male, has a standard length of 6.5 centimetres (2.6 in)), generally smaller than most other Oreoglanis species (although the small sample size makes this distinction largely irrelevant). The main difference between this species and its congeners is its extremely long nasal barbels, almost half the length of the head.
