= Edwin Felix Thomas Atkinson =

Irish lawyer and entomologist

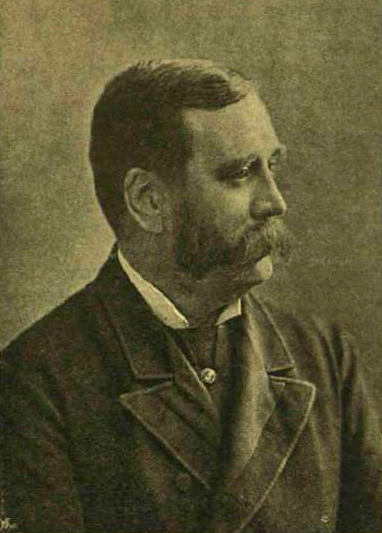
Edwin Felix Thomas Atkinson

Edwin Felix Thomas Atkinson (6 September 1840 – 15 September 1890) was an Irish lawyer in the Indian Civil Service who contributed in his spare time collecting insects and contributing to entomology.

== Life and career ==
He was born in County Tipperary, Ireland, studied at Trinity College, Dublin and sat the Indian Civil Service Examinations in 1861.

He joined the Indian Civil Service in 1862 and served in Bengal Presidency and the North-Western Provinces. Atkinson was a lawyer specialising in Indian law, and successively worked as Judge in a Small Cause Court, Deputy Commissioner of Paper Currency in Allahabad, and Accountant General of the North West Provinces. He was commissioned to produce a Gazetteer of Northwestern India and also wrote several books.

He was a Fellow of the Royal Geographical Society and a member of the Entomological Society of London. As an entomologist, he had a particular interest in Lepidoptera (butterflies and moths) and was credited with identifying several new specimens both in Britain and in India. He was President of The Asiatic Society (of Bengal) for 1886-87 and awarded the title of Companion of the Indian Empire (CIE).

He died in Calcutta in 1890 from Bright's disease. He had married Caroline, the daughter of Major Nicholettes of the Bengal Native Infantry, with whom he had a son, Francis.

== Works ==
- 1875 Descriptive and Historical Account of the Aligarh District, Oxford University Press
- 1881 Gazetteer of the Himalayan Districts of the North-Western Provinces (3 volumes)
- 1885 Notes on Indian Rhynchota; Heteroptera. No. 4. J. Asiat. Soc. Beng. 57: 118-184
- 1886 Notes on Indian Rhynchota; Heteroptera. No. 5. J. Asiat. Soc. Beng. 58: 20-109
- 1890 Catalogue of the Insecta. Order Rhynchota. Suborder Hemiptera-Heteroptera. Family Capsidae. J. Asiat. Soc. Beng. (Nat. Sci. Suppl.) 58: 25-200

== Collections ==
Heteroptera collection Natural History Museum BMNH and Dresden (via Staudinger & Otto Bang-Haas).

== Taxon named in his honor ==
- The Burmese carplet Amblypharyngodon atkinsonii, is a species of carplet in the family Cyprinidae. It is found in the Ayeyarwady, Sittaung, and lower Salween rivers in Myanmar.

== Sources ==
Poggi and Conci (1996) for biographical information.
