= Oreoglanis infulata =

Scientific classification
- Kingdom: Animalia
- Phylum: Chordata
- Class: Actinopterygii
- Order: Siluriformes
- Family: Sisoridae
- Genus: Oreoglanis
- Species: O. infulata

Binomial name
- Oreoglanis infulata H. H. Ng & Freyhof, 2001

Fish species

Oreoglanis infulata is a species of catfish in the family Sisoridae found in central Vietnam.

== Size ==
This species reaches a length of 10.3 cm (4.1 in).

== Etymology ==
The fish's name is derived from the Latin for "adorned with the infula", a reference to a ribbon on a bishop's miter in the Christian church, meaning "banded", referring to the dark band on the anal fin.
