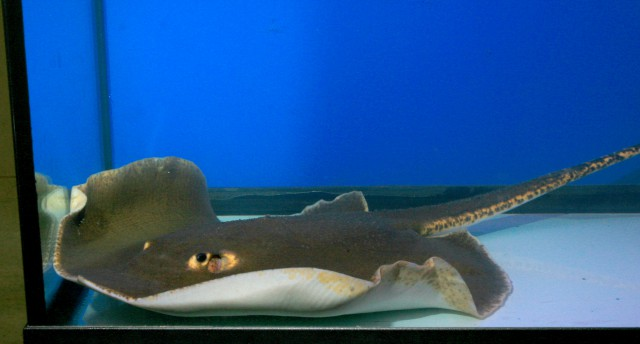

Conservation status
- Endangered (IUCN 3.1)

Scientific classification
- Kingdom: Animalia
- Phylum: Chordata
- Class: Chondrichthyes
- Subclass: Elasmobranchii
- Order: Myliobatiformes
- Family: Dasyatidae
- Genus: Fluvitrygon
- Species: F. kittipongi

Binomial name
- Fluvitrygon kittipongi Vidthayanon & T. R. Roberts, 2005

Synonyms
- Himantura kittipongi

= Roughback whipray =

Species of cartilaginous fish

The roughback whipray (Fluvitrygon kittipongi) is a rare species of freshwater stingray in the family Dasyatidae, found over sandy bottoms in the Mae Klong and Chao Phraya Rivers of Thailand. Growing no more than 29 cm (11 in) across, this small ray has an oval pectoral fin disc and a whip-like tail without fin folds. It closely resembles the white-edge freshwater whipray (F. signifer) in appearance, but can be distinguished by its coloration: light gray to dark orange-brown above and white below with a dark band along the lateral margins. Another identifying feature is a "pearl organ" (enlarged dermal denticle) at the center of the back, found in individuals of all ages. All of the original specimens of the roughback whipray were found with extensive wounds to the fins and tail. The International Union for Conservation of Nature (IUCN) has assessed this species as Endangered, citing the extensive habitat degradation and heavy fishing pressure within its limited range.

== Taxonomy ==
The roughback whipray was described by WWF Thailand Senior Freshwater Biologist Chavalit Vidthayanon and Smithsonian Research Associate Tyson Roberts in a 2005 issue of the scientific journal Natural History Bulletin of the Siam Society. They named the ray after Bangkok aquarium fish dealer and prominent fish expert Khun Jarutanin Kittipong, who the year before had provided the original five specimens that formed the basis for the description. A female 26 cm (10 in) across was designated as the type specimen. Based on morphology, F. kittipongi seems to be most closely related to F. signifer, which shares its range.

== Distribution and habitat ==
The original five specimens of the roughback whipray were all caught from the Mae Klong River in Kanchanaburi Province, Thailand, in fresh water above the influence of the tide. Additional records of this ray exist from the Chao Phraya River, and perhaps the Penang River in Peninsular Malaysia. The total range of the roughback whipray is estimated to cover less than 5,000 km^{2} (1,900 mi^{2}). This bottom-dwelling species inhabits main river channels at a depth of 5–20 m (16–66 ft). In contrast to F. signifer, which favors muddy bottoms, it appears to favor sandy to silty substrates.

== Description ==
The roughback whipray has a thin and oval pectoral fin disc slightly longer than wide, with the anterior margins converging at a broad angle to the tip of the snout. The snout terminates in a small, protruding knob, which is relatively larger than in F. signifer. The eyes are small and immediately followed by larger, teardrop-shaped spiracles. There is a curtain of skin between the nostrils with a gently concave or lobed posterior margin. There are 4–5 papillae (nipple-like structures) across the floor of the small mouth. The small teeth are arranged in 4–5 series in the upper jaw and 14–15 series in the lower jaw; in some individuals, the outermost teeth are stained orange-brown. The whip-like tail lacks fin folds and bears one or two serrated, stinging spines on the upper surface, which are seldom found intact.

The dermal denticles are better-developed than those of F. signifer, with a central band of denticles covering the dorsal surface of the disc and tail base. There is also an enlarged "pearl organ" in the middle of the back that is present throughout life, and a row of enlarged denticles (some thornlike) running from the pearl to the base of the sting. The disc is light gray or brown to dark orange-brown above, with a white to yellow spot just before the eyes and behind the spiracles, and sometimes a subtle, lighter band running around the margin. The underside of the disc is white, and unlike in F. signifer there is a dark (but not black) marginal band that extends from about one-third of the disc length back from the snout top, to the pelvic fins. The tail is gray to orange-brown above and white below at the base, becoming white with dark spots or nearly black past the sting. A small species, the largest known specimen is a female 29 cm (11 in) across.

== Biology and ecology ==
All five original roughback whipray specimens bore extensive, healed wounds to the disc and/or pelvic fins, and had much of their tails bitten off such as that the remnant is only 1.3–1.8 times longer than the disc width (the tail of F. signifer measures over three times the disc width). This is in contrast to other freshwater stingrays in Thailand such as F. signifer, Urogymnus chaophraya and F. oxyrhyncha, which are usually found with their tails intact. Kittipong has proposed that these wounds are inflicted by pufferfishes (Monotrete cf. leiurus and M. cf. nigroviridis); though plausible, why these wounds are seldom found on F. signifer remains a mystery. Another possibility is that the truncation of the tail is self-inflicted, which would be consistent with the similar lengths of the tail remnant in all five specimens. With a particularly small mouth, this species likely feeds on small crustaceans and other benthic invertebrates. Like other stingrays, it is aplacental viviparous with females provisioning their developing embryos with histotroph ("uterine milk"). Males reach sexual maturity at around 25 cm (9.8 in) across.

== Human interactions ==
Uncommon and known only from a few locations, the roughback whipray faces intensive fishing pressure and is subject to incidental capture in demersal tangle nets, fish traps, and on hook-and-line. It may be sold as food like other freshwater stingrays in the region, or to the aquarium trade. In addition, its habitat is threatened by extensive deforestation, dam construction, land development, and water pollution. These pressures are known to have caused declines in other freshwater stingray species, and therefore as a precaution the International Union for Conservation of Nature (IUCN) has listed this species as Endangered.
