= Rheostura =

Scientific classification
- Kingdom: Animalia
- Phylum: Chordata
- Class: Actinopterygii
- Division: Teleostei
- Order: Cypriniformes
- Family: Nemacheilidae
- Genus: Rheostura; Endruweit, 2025

Type species
- Schistura kloetzliae Kottelat, 2000

Genus of fishes

Rheostura is a genus of freshwater ray-finned fishes belonging to the family Nemacheilidae, the stone loaches. The fishes in this genus are found in Southeast Asia and southern China.

== Species ==
Rheostura contains the following valid species:

- Rheostura albirostris (X. Y. Chen & Neely, 2012)
- Rheostura bannaensis (Z. M. Chen, J. X. Yang & W. L. Qi, 2005)
- Rheostura crabro (Kottelat, 2000)
- Rheostura kloetzliae (Kottelat 2000)
- Rheostura pridii (Vidthayanon, 2003)
- Rheostura prolixifasciata (L. P. Zheng, J. X. Yang & X. Y. Chen, 2012)
- Rheostura sexnubes (Endruweit, 2014)
