= Oreoglanis frenata =

Scientific classification
- Kingdom: Animalia
- Phylum: Chordata
- Class: Actinopterygii
- Order: Siluriformes
- Family: Sisoridae
- Genus: Oreoglanis
- Species: O. frenata

Binomial name
- Oreoglanis frenata H. H. Ng & Rainboth, 2001

Fish species

Oreoglanis frenata is a species of catfish in the family Sisoridae, found in Laos.

== Size ==
This species reaches a length of 9.3 cm (3.7 in).

== Etymology ==
The fish's name is Latin for "bridled" or "restrained", referring to the confluent adipose and caudal fins.
