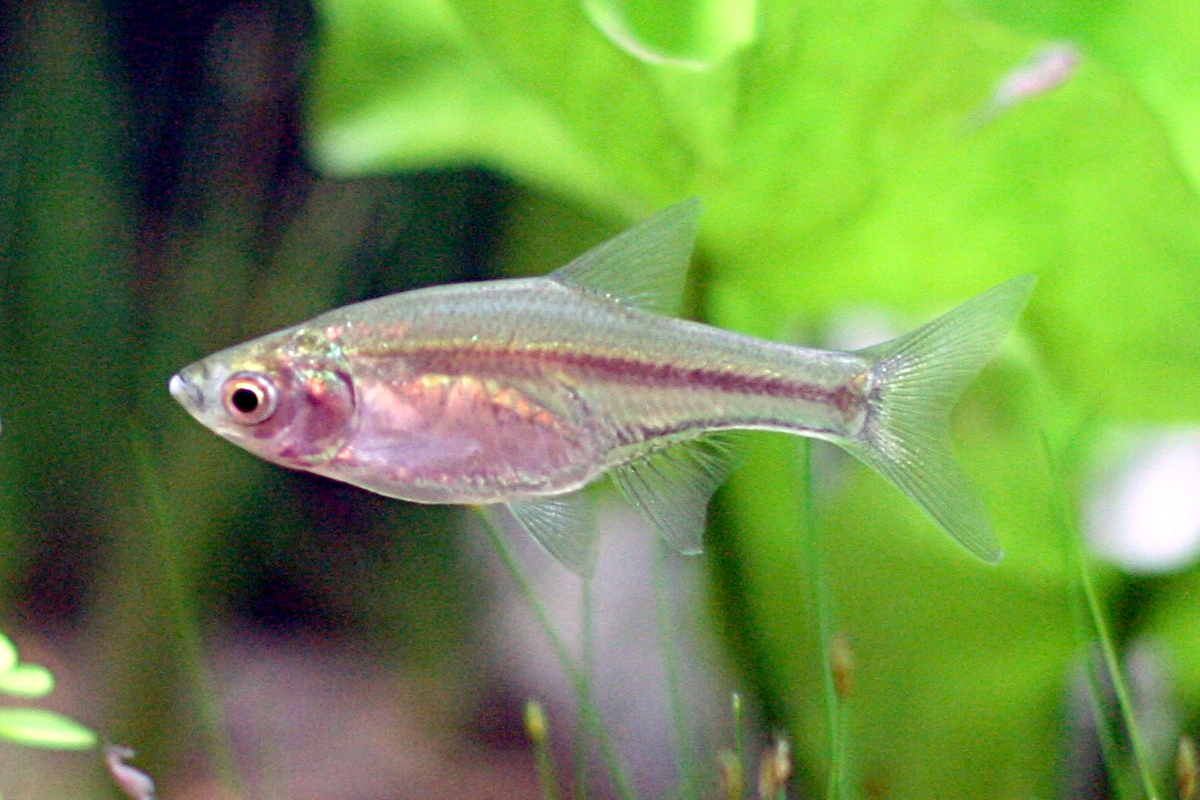
- Amblypharyngodon chulabhornae

Scientific classification
- Kingdom: Animalia
- Phylum: Chordata
- Class: Actinopterygii
- Order: Cypriniformes
- Family: Danionidae
- Subfamily: Rasborinae
- Genus: Amblypharyngodon; Bleeker, 1860

Type species
- Cyprinus mola Hamilton, 1822

Species
- See text

Synonyms
- Brachygramma Day, 1865; Mola Heckel, 1848; Mola Blyth, 1860

= Carplet =

Genus of fishes

The carplets are a genus of freshwater ray-finned fishes, Amblypharyngodon, belonging to the family Danionidae. They are up to 20 cm (7.9 in) in total length and inhabit a wide range of slow-moving or stagnant freshwater habitats in South and Mainland Southeast Asia.

== Species ==
There are 5 recognized species:

- Amblypharyngodon atkinsonii (Blyth, 1860) (Burmese carplet)
- Amblypharyngodon chulabhornae Vidthayanon & Kottelat, 1990
- Amblypharyngodon grandisquamis D. S. Jordan & Starks, 1917 (Sri Lanka silver carplet)
- Amblypharyngodon melettinus (Valenciennes, 1844) (Attentive carplet)
- Amblypharyngodon microlepis (Bleeker, 1854) (Indian carplet)
- Amblypharyngodon mola (Hamilton, 1822) (Mola carplet)

The green carplet is in a separate genus, Horadandia atukorali
