= M. armatus =

M. armatus may refer to:

- Microsynodontis armatus, a catfish species
- Mastacembelus armatus, the tire track eel, a fish species native to the riverine fauna of India, Pakistan, Sumatra, Sri Lanka, Thailand, Viet Nam, Indonesia and other parts of South East Asia
