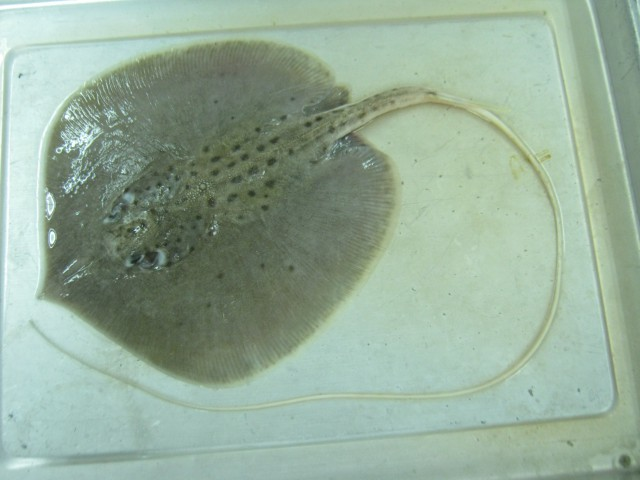
- F. signifer

Scientific classification
- Kingdom: Animalia
- Phylum: Chordata
- Class: Chondrichthyes
- Subclass: Elasmobranchii
- Order: Myliobatiformes
- Family: Dasyatidae
- Subfamily: Urogymninae
- Genus: Fluvitrygon; Last, Naylor & Manjaji-Matsumoto, 2016

Type species
- Himantura signifer Compagno & Roberts, 1982

= Fluvitrygon =

Genus of cartilaginous fishes

Fluvitrygon is a genus of stingrays in the family Dasyatidae from freshwater in southeast Asia. Its species were formerly contained within the genus Himantura.

== Species ==
- Fluvitrygon kittipongi (Vidthayanon & Roberts, 2006) (Roughback whipray)
- Fluvitrygon oxyrhyncha (Sauvage, 1878) (Marbled whipray)
- Fluvitrygon signifer (Compagno & Roberts, 1982) (White-edge freshwater whipray)
