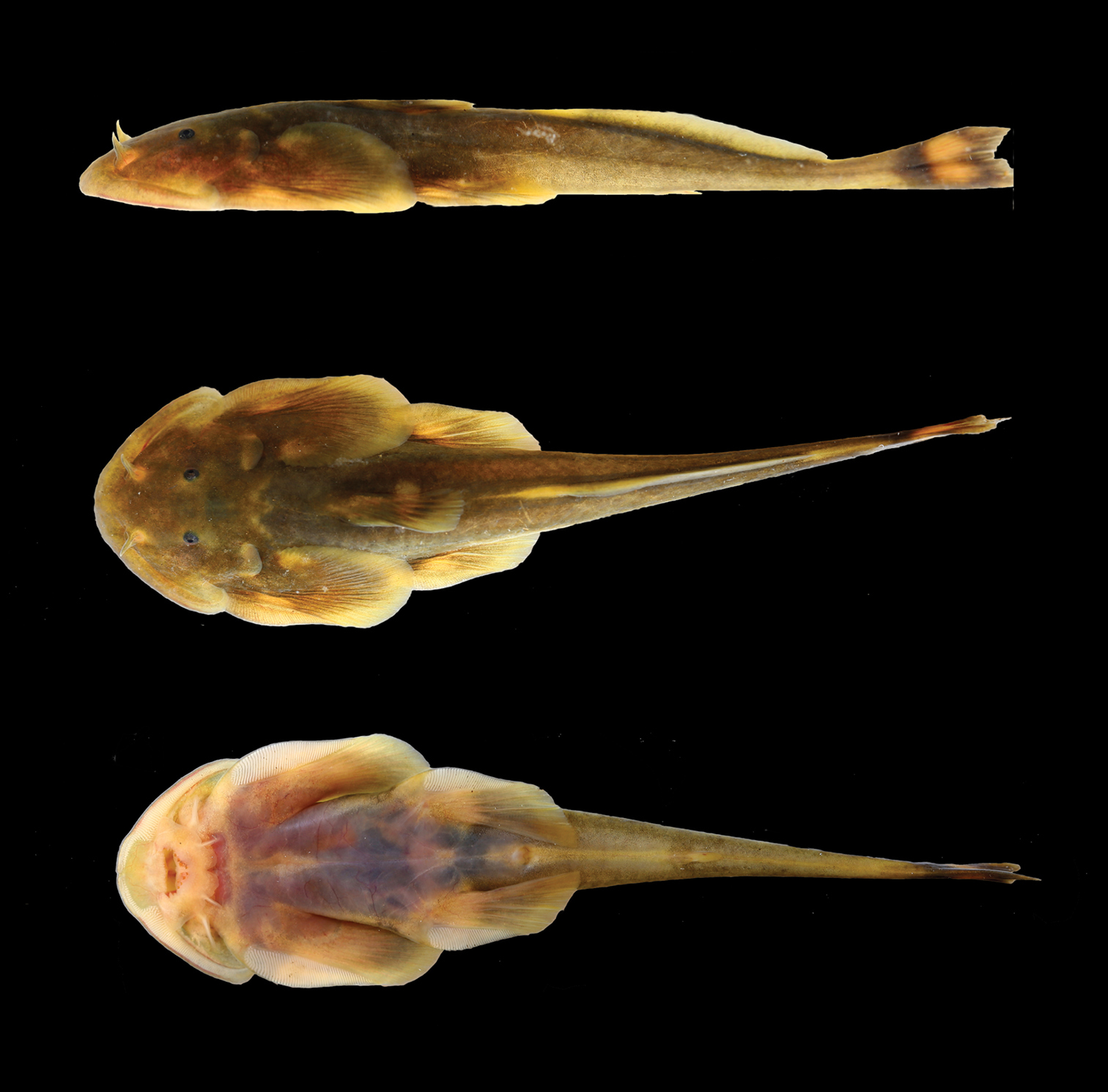
- Oreoglanis hponkanensis

Scientific classification
- Kingdom: Animalia
- Phylum: Chordata
- Class: Actinopterygii
- Order: Siluriformes
- Family: Sisoridae
- Tribe: Glyptosternina
- Genus: Oreoglanis; H. M. Smith, 1933

Type species
- Oreoglanis siamensis H. M. Smith, 1933

= Oreoglanis =

Genus of fishes

Oreoglanis is a genus of fish in the family Sisoridae native to Asia. These fish live in fast-flowing streams in China, mainland Southeast Asia and the Indian subcontinent. They are mainly distributed in the Mekong, upper Salween and Irrawaddy River drainages. They range from the Brahmaputra basin to the Lam River drainage in central Vietnam. They are easily distinguished from other catfishes by their strongly depressed head and body and greatly enlarged paired fins that have been modified to form an adhesive apparatus. The flattened shape of these fish and the large pectoral and pelvic fins provide essential adhesion in the fast-flowing waters they live in.

== Taxonomy ==
The taxonomy of this group is currently under discussion, and changes seem inevitable as the group is suspected to be non-monophyletic. Based on morphology, Oreoglanis has been divided into two species groups. According to the original description of these groups, the O. siamensis species group is distinguished by having an emarginate caudal fin, and a lower lip notched medially with an entire or weakly laciniate posterior margin, while the O. delacouri species group is distinguished by having a lunate caudal fin and a lower lip without a median notch, with prominent extensions along the posterior margin. It has been suggested that only the marginal morphology of the lower lip can be employed to recognize the two species groups.

== Species ==
There are currently 24 recognized species in this genus:

- Oreoglanis brevicula H. H. Ng & Kottelat, 2024
- Oreoglanis colurus Vidthayanon, Saenjundaeng & H. H. Ng, 2009
- Oreoglanis delacouri (Pellegrin, 1936)
- Oreoglanis frenata H. H. Ng & Rainboth, 2001
- Oreoglanis heteropogon Vidthayanon, Saenjundaeng & H. H. Ng, 2009
- Oreoglanis hponkanensis X. Y. Chen, T. Qin & Z. Y. Chen, 2017
- Oreoglanis hypsiura H. H. Ng & Kottelat, 1999
- Oreoglanis immaculata D. P. Kong, X. Y. Chen & J. X. Yang, 2007
- Oreoglanis infulata H. H. Ng & Freyhof, 2001
- Oreoglanis insignis H. H. Ng & Rainboth, 2001
- Oreoglanis jingdongensis D. P. Kong, X. Y. Chen & J. X. Yang, 2007
- Oreoglanis laciniosa Vidthayanon, Saenjundaeng & H. H. Ng, 2009
- Oreoglanis lepturus H. H. Ng & Rainboth, 2001
- Oreoglanis macronemus H. H. Ng, 2004
- Oreoglanis macroptera (Vinciguerra, 1890)
- Oreoglanis majuscula Linthoingambi & Vishwanath, 2011
- Oreoglanis nakasathiani Vidthayanon, Saenjundaeng & H. H. Ng, 2009
- Oreoglanis omkoiense Suvarnaraksha, 2020
- Oreoglanis pangenensis Sinha & Tamang, 2015
- Oreoglanis setigera H. H. Ng & Rainboth, 2001
- Oreoglanis siamensis H. M. Smith, 1933 (Siamese bat catfish)
- Oreoglanis sudarai Vidthayanon, Saenjundaeng & H. H. Ng, 2009
- Oreoglanis suraswadii Vidthayanon, Saenjundaeng & H. H. Ng, 2009
- Oreoglanis tenuicauda Vidthayanon, Saenjundaeng & H. H. Ng, 2009
- Oreoglanis vicina Vidthayanon, Saenjundaeng & H. H. Ng, 2009
