= Oreoglanis lepturus =

Scientific classification
- Kingdom: Animalia
- Phylum: Chordata
- Class: Actinopterygii
- Order: Siluriformes
- Family: Sisoridae
- Genus: Oreoglanis
- Species: O. lepturus

Binomial name
- Oreoglanis lepturus H. H. Ng & Rainboth, 2001

Fish species

Oreoglanis lepturus is a species of catfish in the family Sisoridae, found in Laos.

== Size ==
This species reaches a length of 9.1 cm (3.6 in).

== Etymology ==
The fish's name derives from leptós (Gr. λεπτός), "fine" or "thin"; urus, from ourá (Gr. οὐρά), "tail", referring to its relatively long and slender caudal peduncle.
