= Rheostura crabro =

Conservation status
- Data Deficient (IUCN 3.1)

Scientific classification
- Kingdom: Animalia
- Phylum: Chordata
- Class: Actinopterygii
- Division: Teleostei
- Order: Cypriniformes
- Family: Nemacheilidae
- Genus: Rheostura
- Species: R. crabro

Binomial name
- Rheostura crabro (Kottelat, 2000)

Synonyms
- Schistura crabro, Kottelat, 2000

Species of fish

Rheostura crabro is a species of freshwater ray-finned fish belonging to the family Nemacheilidae, the stone loaches. This species is only known from its holotype collected in the Nam Ngiap basin in Laos in 1999.
