= Rheostura pridii =

Conservation status
- Endangered (IUCN 3.1)

Scientific classification
- Kingdom: Animalia
- Phylum: Chordata
- Class: Actinopterygii
- Division: Teleostei
- Order: Cypriniformes
- Family: Nemacheilidae
- Genus: Rheostura
- Species: R. pridii

Binomial name
- Rheostura pridii (Vidthayanon, 2003)

Synonyms
- Schistura pridii Vidthayanon,2003

Species of fish

Schistura pridii is a species of freshwater ray-finned fish belonging to the family Nemacheilidae, the stone loaches. It is found in the upper Chao Phraya basin, in streams in the Doi Chiang Dao Wildlife Sanctuary, Chiang Mai Province in Thailand. Here it inhabits torrents, with rocky gravel and pebble substrates in which it often hides.

This species reaches a standard length of 3.8 cm (1.5 in).

Named in honor of Pridi Banomyong, statesman and former Prime Minister of Thailand.

In the year 2018, this species can be successfully bred by the Department of Fisheries of Thailand, after a 12-year experiment, but the yields were low.
