= Rheostura bannaensis =

Scientific classification
- Kingdom: Animalia
- Phylum: Chordata
- Class: Actinopterygii
- Division: Teleostei
- Order: Cypriniformes
- Family: Nemacheilidae
- Genus: Rheostura
- Species: R. bannaensis

Binomial name
- Rheostura bannaensis (Z. M. Chen, J. X. Yang & W. L. Qi, 2005)

Synonyms
- Schistura bannaensis Z. M. Chen, J. X. Yang & W. L. Qi, 2005

Species of fish

Rheostura bannaensis is a species of freshwater ray-finned fish belonging to the family Nemacheilidae, the stone loaches. It is endemic to the Nanla River basin, a part of the upper Mekong basin in Yunnan, China. It grows to 4.3 cm (1.7 in) standard length.
