= Oreoglanis jingdongensis =

Scientific classification
- Kingdom: Animalia
- Phylum: Chordata
- Class: Actinopterygii
- Order: Siluriformes
- Family: Sisoridae
- Genus: Oreoglanis
- Species: O. jingdongensis

Binomial name
- Oreoglanis jingdongensis D. P. Kong, X. Y. Chen & J. X. Yang, 2007

Fish species

Oreoglanis jingdongensis is a species of catfish in the family Sisoridae, found in the Mekong River basin in China.

== Size ==
This species reaches a length of 6.9 cm (2.7 in).

== Etymology ==
The fish's name is derived from the Latin -ensis, a suffix denoting place: Jingdong Country, Yunnan Province, China, is the type locality of this fish.
