= Oreoglanis pangenensis =

Scientific classification
- Kingdom: Animalia
- Phylum: Chordata
- Class: Actinopterygii
- Order: Siluriformes
- Family: Sisoridae
- Genus: Oreoglanis
- Species: O. pangenensis

Binomial name
- Oreoglanis pangenensis Sinha & Tamang, 2015

Fish species

Oreoglanis pangenensis is a species of catfish in the family Sisoridae, found in the Pange River, Lower Subansiri District, Arunachal Pradesh, northeastern India.

== Size ==
This species reaches a length of 7.7 cm (3.0 in).

== Etymology ==
The fish's name includes -ensis, a Latin suffix denoting place: Pange River, Arunachal Pradesh, India, is the type locality.
