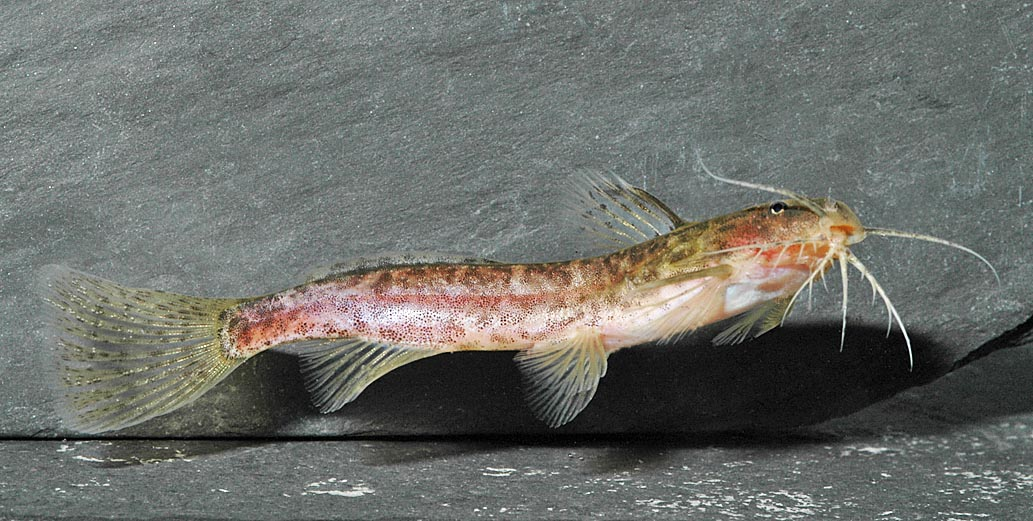

Conservation status
- Least Concern (IUCN 3.1)

Scientific classification
- Kingdom: Animalia
- Phylum: Chordata
- Class: Actinopterygii
- Order: Siluriformes
- Family: Mochokidae
- Genus: Microsynodontis
- Species: M. polli

Binomial name
- Microsynodontis polli J. G. Lambert, 1958

= Microsynodontis polli =

Species of fish

Microsynodontis polli is a species of upside-down catfish native to Guinea from the Gbin River and Liberia from Saint John. This species grows to a length of 4.1 centimetres (1.6 in) TL.

== Etymology ==
The catfish is named in honor of ichthyologist Max Poll, the Curator, of the Musée de Congo Belge in Tervuren.
