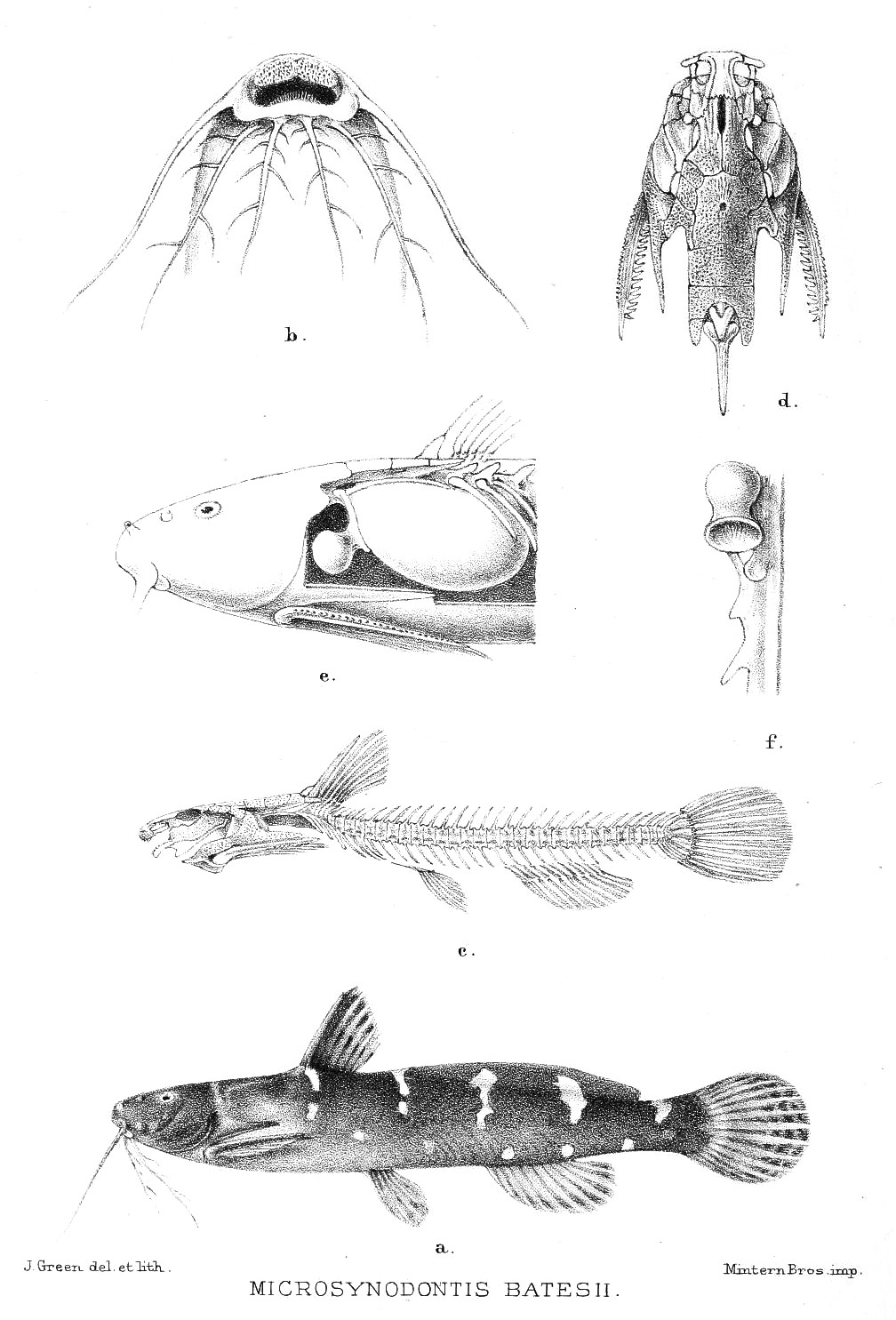

Conservation status
- Data Deficient (IUCN 3.1)

Scientific classification
- Kingdom: Animalia
- Phylum: Chordata
- Class: Actinopterygii
- Order: Siluriformes
- Family: Mochokidae
- Genus: Microsynodontis
- Species: M. batesii

Binomial name
- Microsynodontis batesii Boulenger, 1903

Synonyms
- Microsynodontis batesi Boulenger, 1903

= Microsynodontis batesii =

Species of fish

Microsynodontis batesii is a species of upside-down catfish native to rivers of Cameroon, the Democratic Republic of the Congo, and Gabon. This species grows to a standard length of 10 cm (3.9 in).

== Etymology ==
The fish's specific name honors George Latimer Bates (1863–1940), a Cameroon farmer and ornithologist, who collected specimens for the Natural History Museum, London, including the holotype of this species.
