= Oreoglanis macroptera =

Scientific classification
- Kingdom: Animalia
- Phylum: Chordata
- Class: Actinopterygii
- Order: Siluriformes
- Family: Sisoridae
- Genus: Oreoglanis
- Species: O. macroptera

Binomial name
- Oreoglanis macroptera Vinciguerra, 1890

Fish species

Oreoglanis macroptera is a species of catfish in the family Sisoridae, found in Myanmar and China.

== Size ==
This species reaches a length of 6.5 cm (2.6 in).

== Etymology ==
The fish's name means "macro-", from makrós (Gr. μακρός), "long" or "large"; ptera, from pterón (Gr. πτερόν) or ptéryx (πτέρυξ), fin, referring to its large pectoral fins, which extend far beyond the belly and the dorsal-fin base.
