= Microsynodontis christyi =

Conservation status
- Least Concern (IUCN 3.1)

Scientific classification
- Kingdom: Animalia
- Phylum: Chordata
- Class: Actinopterygii
- Order: Siluriformes
- Family: Mochokidae
- Genus: Microsynodontis
- Species: M. christyi

Binomial name
- Microsynodontis christyi Boulenger, 1920

Species of fish

Microsynodontis christyi is a species of upside-down catfish endemic to the Democratic Republic of the Congo, where it occurs in the central Congo river basin. This species grows to a length of 39.8 millimetres (1.57 in) SL.
