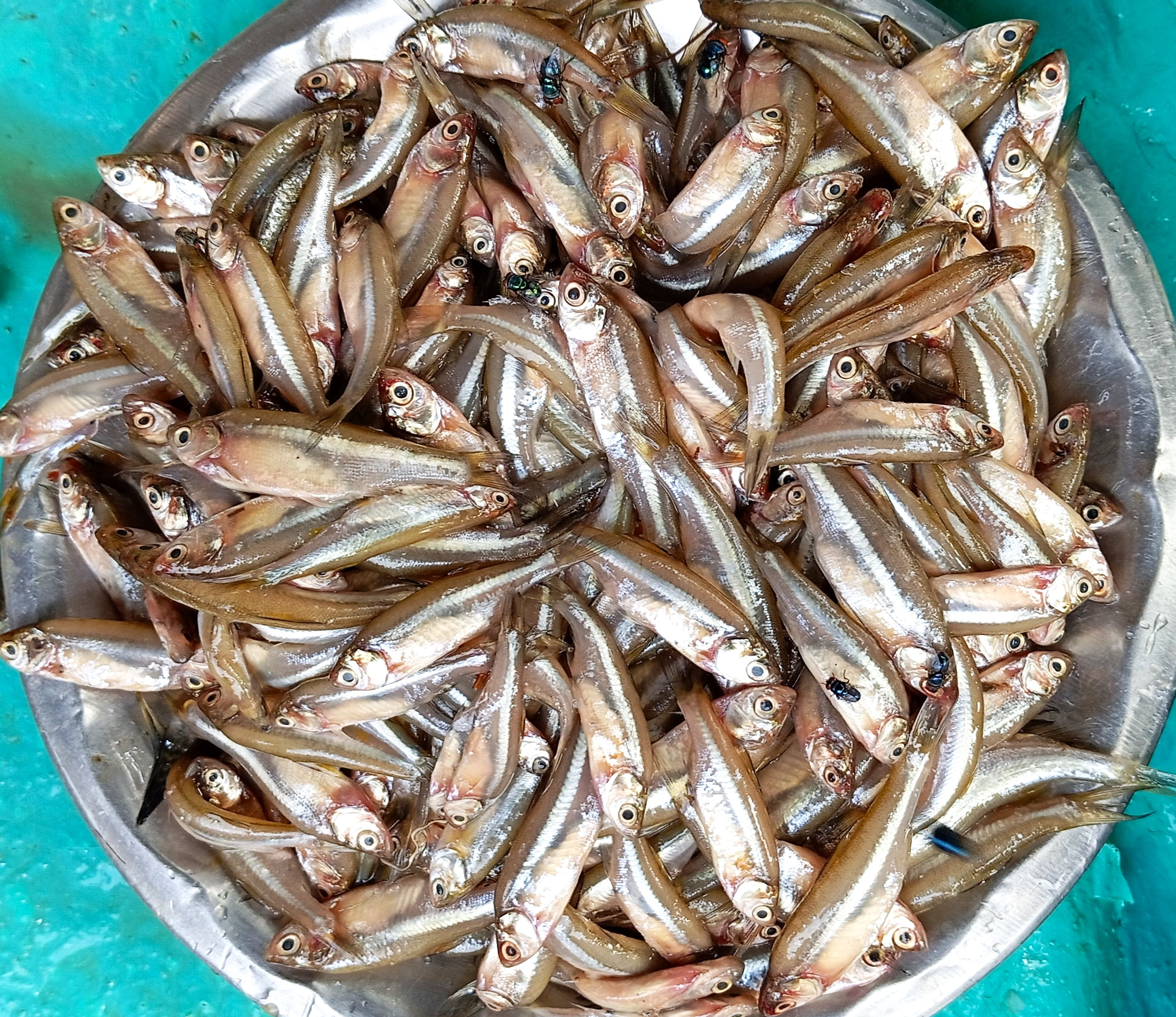

Conservation status
- Least Concern (IUCN 3.1)

Scientific classification
- Kingdom: Animalia
- Phylum: Chordata
- Class: Actinopterygii
- Order: Cypriniformes
- Family: Danionidae
- Genus: Amblypharyngodon
- Species: A. mola

Binomial name
- Amblypharyngodon mola (Hamilton, 1822)

Synonyms
- Cyprinus mola Hamilton, 1822; Leuciscus mola (Hamilton, 1822); Leuciscus pellucidus McClelland, 1839; Amblypharyngodon pellucidus (McClelland, 1839); Mola buchanani Blyth, 1860; Amblypharyngodon saranensis Chaudhuri, 1912; Amblypharyngodon gadigarhi Malhotra & Singh Dutta, 1975

= Mola carplet =

Species of fish

The mola carplet (Amblypharyngodon mola) is a species of carplet in the family Danionidae. It is found in Afghanistan, Pakistan, India, Bangladesh, and Myanmar, although IUCN considers its presence certain only in Pakistan, India, and Bangladesh. Adult Amblypharyngodon mola are typically found in ponds, canals, beels, slow-moving streams, nullahs, and paddy fields. They can reach 20 cm (7.9 in) in total length.

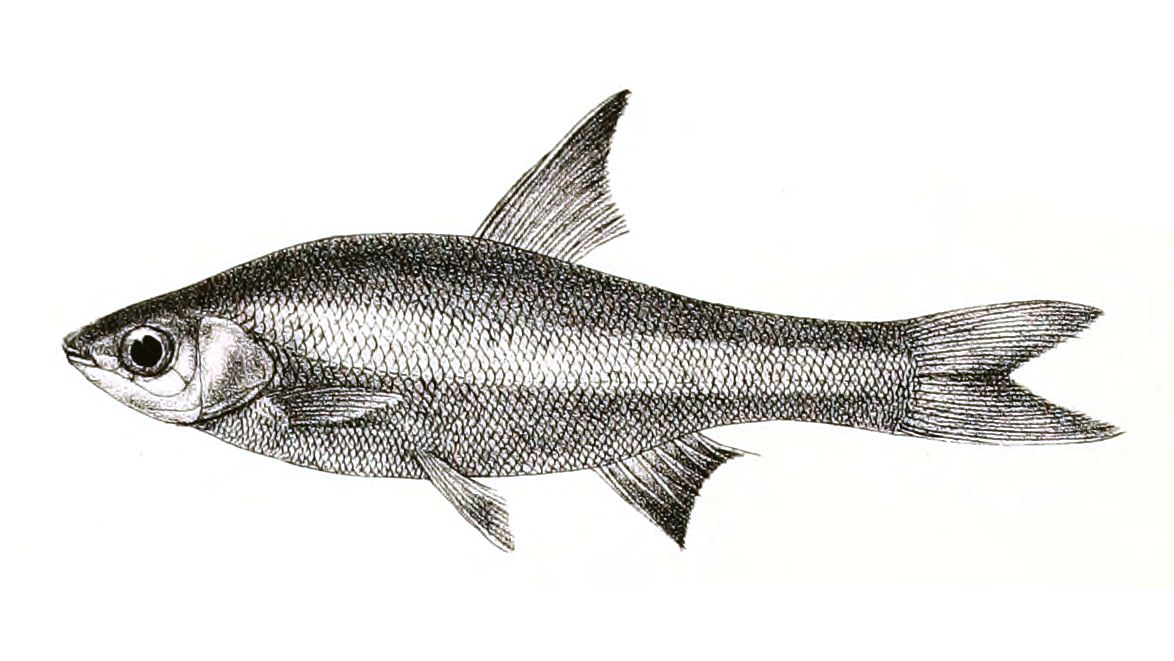
Mourala (Mola carplet)

In Indian subcontinent mola carplet has value as foodfish.
