= Microsynodontis lamberti =

Conservation status
- Data Deficient (IUCN 3.1)

Scientific classification
- Kingdom: Animalia
- Phylum: Chordata
- Class: Actinopterygii
- Order: Siluriformes
- Family: Mochokidae
- Genus: Microsynodontis
- Species: M. lamberti

Binomial name
- Microsynodontis lamberti Poll & Gosse, 1963

Species of fish

Microsynodontis lamberti is a species of upside-down catfish endemic to the Democratic Republic of the Congo where it is found in the Lilanda River. This species grows to a length of 3.5 centimetres (1.4 in) SL.

== Etymology ==
The fish is named in honor of Belgian ichthyologist and botanist Jacques G. Lambert (1923–2013).
