= Oreoglanis immaculata =

Scientific classification
- Kingdom: Animalia
- Phylum: Chordata
- Class: Actinopterygii
- Order: Siluriformes
- Family: Sisoridae
- Genus: Oreoglanis
- Species: O. immaculata

Binomial name
- Oreoglanis immaculata D. P. Kong, X. Y. Chen & J. X. Yang, 2007

Fish species

Oreoglanis immaculata is a species of catfish in the family Sisoridae found in the Salween River basin in China.

== Size ==
This species reaches a length of 6.9 cm (2.7 in).

== Etymology ==
The fish's name is derived from the Latin im-, from in (L.), meaning "not"; maculata, meaning "spotted", referring to the absence of the light-yellow patches below the adipose fin, which is an otherwise common feature in this genus.
