= Oreoglanis majuscula =

Scientific classification
- Kingdom: Animalia
- Phylum: Chordata
- Class: Actinopterygii
- Order: Siluriformes
- Family: Sisoridae
- Genus: Oreoglanis
- Species: O. majuscula

Binomial name
- Oreoglanis majuscula Linthoingambi & Vishwanath, 2011

Species of catfish

Oreoglanis majuscula is a species of catfish in the family Sisoridae, found in the Kameng River in Arunachal Pradesh state, Brahmaputra drainage, India.

== Size ==
This species reaches a length of 7.6 cm (3.0 in).

== Etymology ==
The fish's name is Latin for "somewhat greater", referring to its large paired fins.
