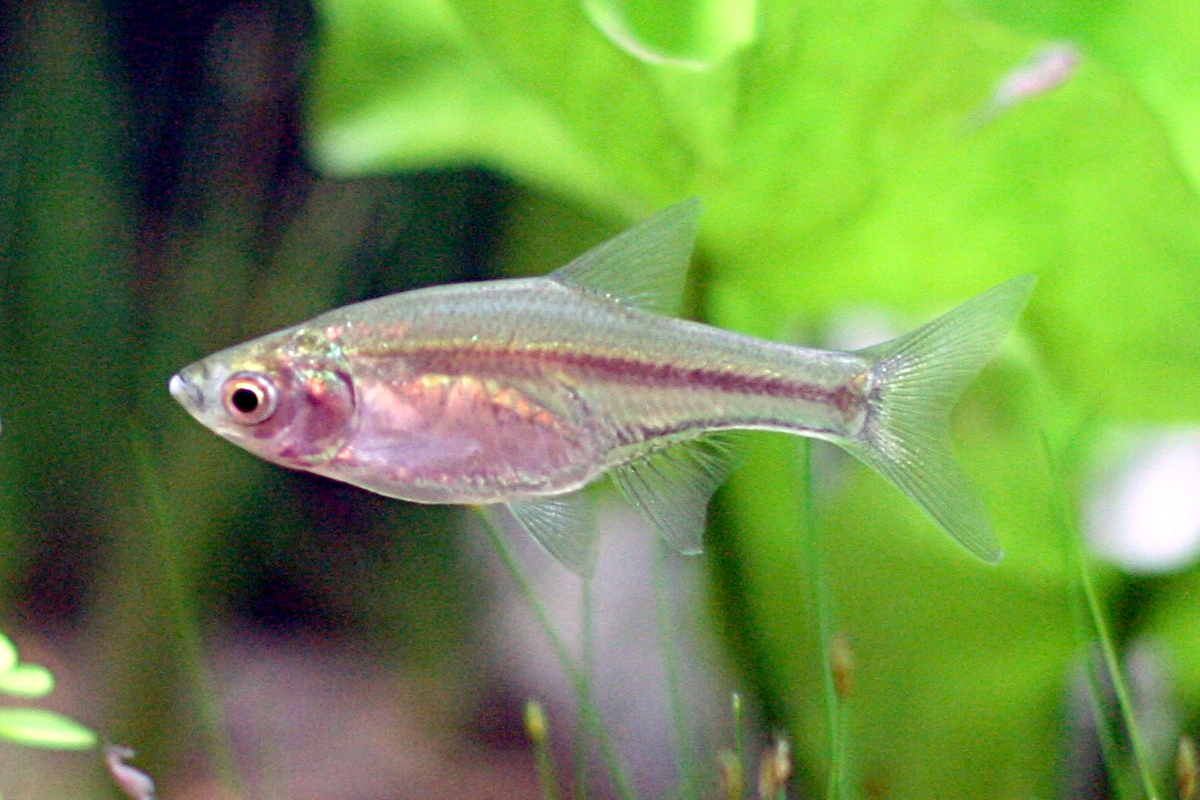
- Amblypharyngodon chulabhornae

Conservation status
- Least Concern (IUCN 3.1)

Scientific classification
- Kingdom: Animalia
- Phylum: Chordata
- Class: Actinopterygii
- Order: Cypriniformes
- Family: Danionidae
- Subfamily: Rasborinae
- Genus: Amblypharyngodon
- Species: A. chulabhornae

Binomial name
- Amblypharyngodon chulabhornae Vidthayanon & Kottelat, 1990, 1990

= Amblypharyngodon chulabhornae =

Species of fish

Amblypharyngodon chulabhornae, the princess carplet, is a species of carplet belonging to the family Danionidae from mainland south-east Asia.

== Description ==
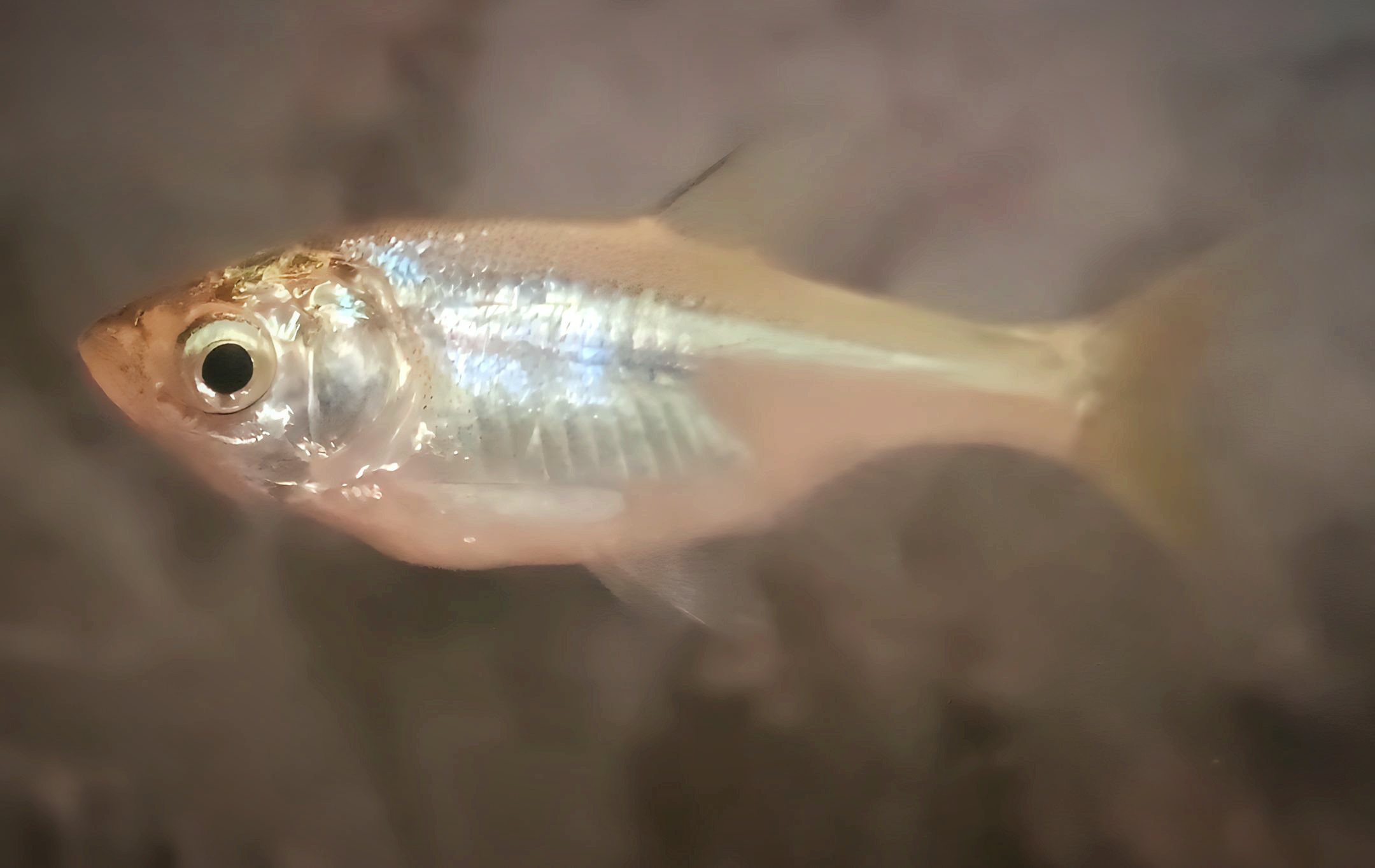
Amblypharyngodon chulabhornae

Amblypharyngodon chulabhornae has 10 soft rays in the dorsal fin with 8 in the anal fin, it has 31-32 vertebrae. It is distinguished from other species in the genus Amblypharyngodon in having a smaller number scales on the lateral row, 42-50 in A. chulabhornae compared to 50-79 in other species in the genus, likewise this species has 6-7 perforated scales along its lateral line and 4-5 scales on a transverse row situated along the normal course of the lateral line in other fish and the pelvic fin base. The body is golden in colour, with a blue eye and lacks a barbel. Its maximum standard length is 30-40mm but mature females grow a little larger than the males and have a more rounded belly.

== Habitat and distribution ==
Amblypharyngodon chulabhornae can be found in shallow standing water such as within paddy fields and in ditches, preferring vegetated areas with growths of floating and emergent vegetation as well seasonally flooded terrestrial grasses. It is found in the Chao Phraya and Mekong basin in Thailand, Laos and Cambodia, as well the Mae Klong basins and river systems in southeast Thailand extending into the upper Thai-Malay peninsula. It may have been introduced to Singapore and appears to be established there.

== Habits ==
Amblypharyngodon chulabhornae probably feeds small invertebrates, zooplankton and algae. They are sociable fish and prefer to live in small schools. they breed by spawning, most likely scattering the eggs on the substrate and showing no care thereafter.

== Conservation ==
It is still common and is treated as being of "Least Concern" by the IUCN but population in some areas appear to be in declining such as on Chao Phraya in Thailand while in waters around Phnom Penh the species remains common. It does not appear in the local fishmarkets but may be consumed by subsistence fishermen, and the main threat appears to be pollution. It is rare in the aquarium trade and if it is offered for sale in that trade this is probably as a result of bycatch by fishermen hunting other species.

== Etymology ==
The generic name derives from the Ancient Greek amblús meaning "blunted", pháruks meaning throat and odṓn meaning "toothed" in referenced to the shape of the pharyngeal teeth, the specific name is in honour of H.R.H. Princess Chulabhorn Mahidol of Thailand in recognition of her interest in and patronage of the sciences and technology.
