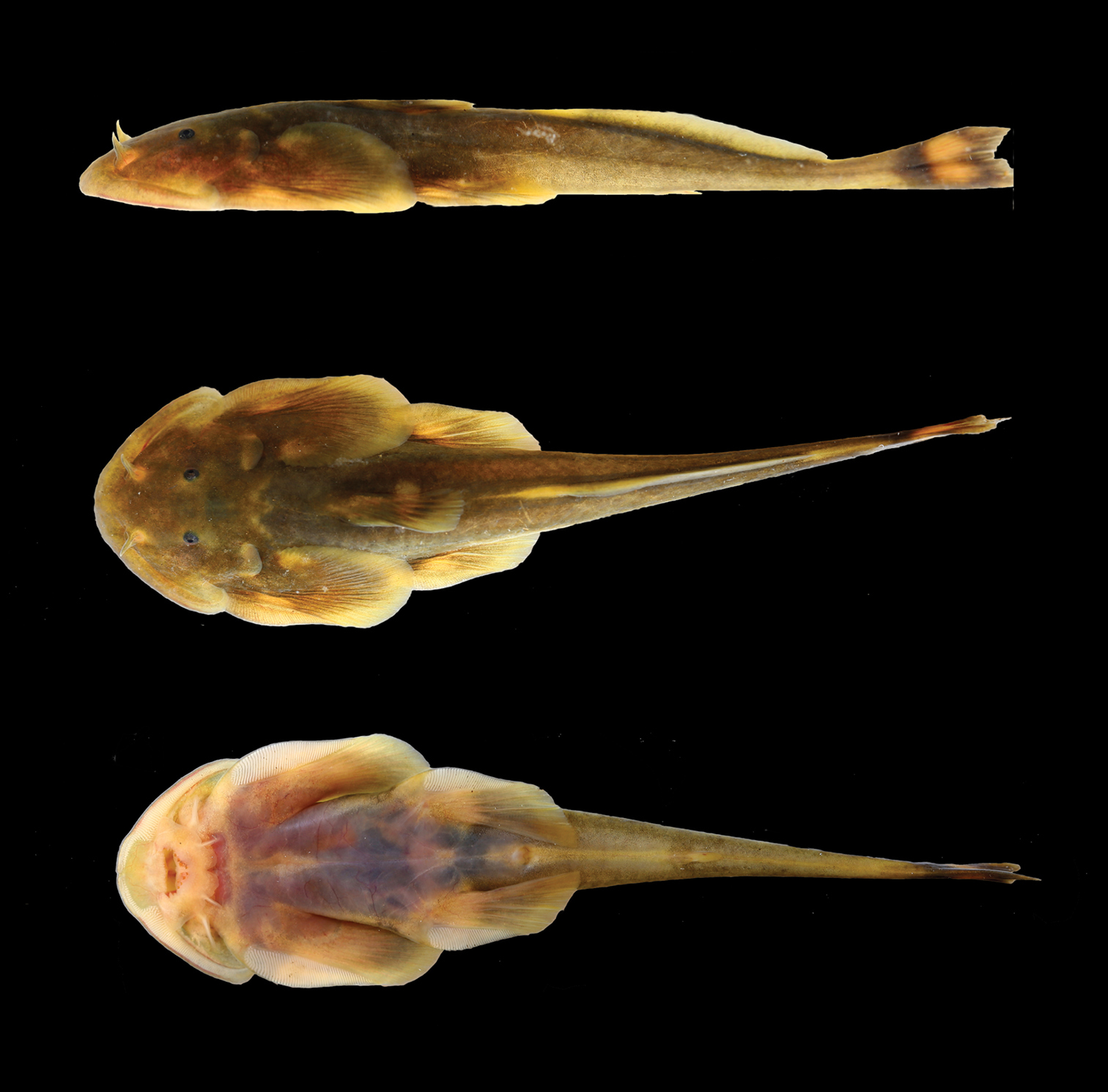
- Oreoglanis hponkanensis

Scientific classification
- Kingdom: Animalia
- Phylum: Chordata
- Class: Actinopterygii
- Order: Siluriformes
- Family: Sisoridae
- Genus: Oreoglanis
- Species: O. hponkanensis

Binomial name
- Oreoglanis hponkanensis X. Y. Chen, T. Qin & Z. Y. Chen, 2017

= Oreoglanis hponkanensis =

Fish species

Oreoglanis hponkanensis is a species of catfish in the family Sisoridae, found in Myanmar.

== Size ==
This species reaches a length of 6.9 cm (2.7 in).

== Etymology ==
The fish's name is derived from the Latin -ensis, a suffix denoting place: Hponkanrazi Wildlife Sanctuary, in the Kachin state, in Myanmar, is the type specimen locality.
