= Oreoglanis siamensis =

Conservation status
- Endangered (IUCN 3.1)

Scientific classification
- Kingdom: Animalia
- Phylum: Chordata
- Class: Actinopterygii
- Order: Siluriformes
- Family: Sisoridae
- Genus: Oreoglanis
- Species: O. siamensis

Binomial name
- Oreoglanis siamensis H. M. Smith, 1933

Species of fish

Oreoglanis siamensis, the Siamese bat catfish, is a species of sisorid catfish in the Sisoridae endemic to Thailand, where it is found in the Chao Phraya and Mekong River basins. This species grows to a length of 14.0 centimetres (5.5 in) SL. It lives only in streams of 1,200 meters (3,937 ft) above sea level.

It was first studied and described by American ichthyologist H.M. Smith from a type specimen taken from Doi Luang Ang Ka (present-day Doi Inthanon)'s stream by Karen people in December 1928. Later, it was found in many streams as a branch of the Ping River in Chiang Mai Province.

In Thailand, this is one of four species of freshwater fish that are protected by the Department of Fisheries in 1992, along with the Asian bonytongue or dragon fish (Scleropages formosus), Siamese tiger perch (Datnioides pulcher) and dwarf loach or Aree's loach (Ambastaia sidthimunki).
