= Oreoglanis omkoiense =

Scientific classification
- Kingdom: Animalia
- Phylum: Chordata
- Class: Actinopterygii
- Order: Siluriformes
- Family: Sisoridae
- Genus: Oreoglanis
- Species: O. omkoiense

Binomial name
- Oreoglanis omkoiense Suvarnaraksha, 2020

Species of fish

Oreoglanis omkoiense is a fish in the genus Oreoglanis, which can be found in the rivers of Thailand.

== Size ==
This species reaches a length of 6.9 cm (2.7 in).

== Etymology ==
The fish's name includes -ensis, a Latin suffix denoting place: Omkoi Subdistrict, Omkoi District, Chiangmai Province, Thailand, is where the type locality (a highland stream) is situated.
