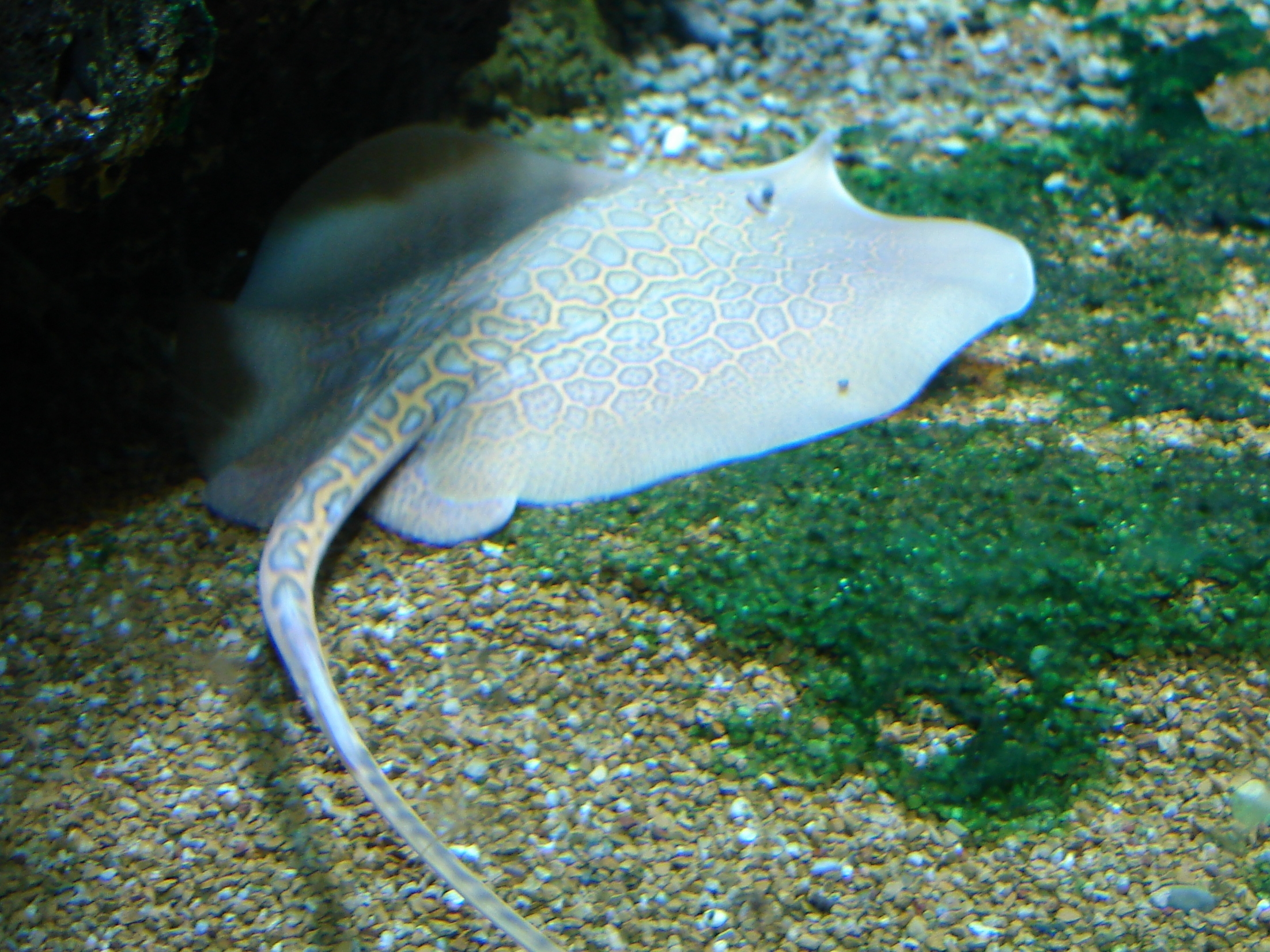

Conservation status
- Endangered (IUCN 3.1)

Scientific classification
- Kingdom: Animalia
- Phylum: Chordata
- Class: Chondrichthyes
- Subclass: Elasmobranchii
- Order: Myliobatiformes
- Family: Dasyatidae
- Genus: Fluvitrygon
- Species: F. oxyrhynchus

Binomial name
- Fluvitrygon oxyrhynchus (Sauvage, 1878)
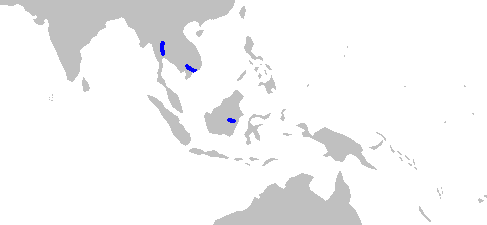
- Range of the marbled whipray

Synonyms
- Fluvitrygon oxyrhyncha (Sauvage, 1878); Himantura oxyrhyncha (Sauvage, 1878); Himantura oxyrhynchus (Sauvage, 1878); Trygon oxyrhynchus Sauvage, 1878

= Marbled whipray =

Species of cartilaginous fish

The marbled whipray (Fluvitrygon oxyrhynchus) is a little-known species of stingray in the family Dasyatidae, native to several freshwater rivers in Southeast Asia. This species has an oval pectoral fin disc with an elongated, pointed snout and a very long, whip-like tail without fin folds. It is characterized by numerous heart-shaped dermal denticles and tubercles on its upper surface, as well as a reticulated pattern of brown blotches on a light background. The maximum recorded disc width is 36 cm (14 in). The marbled whipray has been assessed as Endangered by the International Union for Conservation of Nature (IUCN); it is heavily threatened by fishing and habitat loss, degradation, and fragmentation.

== Taxonomy ==
French zoologist Henri-Emilé Sauvage originally described the marbled whipray as Trygon oxyrhynchus based on a female specimen caught near Saigon, Vietnam, in an 1878 volume of the scientific journal Bulletin de la Société philomathique de Paris. In 1913, Samuel Garman synonymized this species with Himantura uarnak, a judgment that remained unquestioned in subsequent literature until Maurice Kottelat referenced the name in his 1984 review of Indochinese fishes. This species may also be referred to as the longnose marbled whipray or the marbled freshwater stingray.

== Distribution and habitat ==
Among the few members of its family restricted to fresh water, the marbled whipray has been reported from Saigon in Vietnam, the Mekong River near Tonle Sap and Phnom Penh in Cambodia, the lower Nan and Chao Phraya Rivers in Thailand, and the Mahakam River in Kalimantan, Indonesia. The subpopulations inhabiting these rivers are likely isolated from one another. This bottom-dwelling species favors a sandy substrate in which it can bury itself.

== Description ==
The marbled stingray has a thin, oval-shaped pectoral fin disc longer than wide. The snout is long and triangular, with the pointed tip projecting from the disc. The eyes are small, and immediately followed by spiracles over twice their diameter. There is a curtain of skin between the nares with a fringed trailing margin. The mouth is gently arched and contains an anterior row of four and posterior row of two papillae across the floor, which are followed by a seventh papilla in larger individuals. There are 40–42 tooth rows in the upper jaw and 42–46 tooth rows in the lower jaw; the teeth are arranged with a quincunx pattern into pavement-like surfaces. The tail measures three times as long as the disc and bears two long stinging spines on top; after the spine the tail becomes thin and whip-like, without any fin folds.

There are numerous flattened, heart-shaped dermal denticles on the back, arranged in a dense central band reaching the base of the tail, and becoming smaller and sparser on the outer portions of the disc. Larger, heart-shaped denticles are scattered over the disc, especially around the "shoulders" and the middle of the back. Two pearl spines are present. There is a line of 40–41 flat tubercles running down the dorsal midline, from between the eyes to the tail spines; adult individuals also have two lines of spiny denticles running along the sides of the tail from the spine to the tip. The dorsal coloration is white to light gray, with brownish hexagonal blotches forming a reticulated pattern that fades towards the disc margin. Smaller individuals are covered by many irregular dark spots. The underside is entirely light-colored. This ray attains a disc width of 36 cm (14 in).

== Biology and ecology ==
The natural history of the marbled whipray is poorly understood. It likely feeds on benthic organisms such as small crustaceans and molluscs. Reproduction is aplacental viviparous with females supplying their unborn young with histotroph ("uterine milk"), as in other stingrays.

== Human interactions ==
Only five specimens of the marbled whipray have been deposited in museums. However, it is reportedly locally common in some rivers and streams. It is an infrequent incidental catch of intense fishery activities taking place across much of its range, using demersal tangle nets, fish traps, and hook-and-line. These attractively colored rays, especially the young, are valued by the aquarium trade. Another major threat to the marbled whipray is habitat loss and degradation, from pollution, logging, and dam construction. In Thailand, dams on the Chao Phraya have prevented stingrays in different stretches of the river from intermingling, with a negative effect on genetic diversity. Citing these threats, the International Union for Conservation of Nature (IUCN) has assessed this species as Endangered. During the 1990s, the Thai government initiated a captive breeding program for this and other endangered freshwater stingrays at Chai Nat, but by 1996 the program had been placed on hold.
