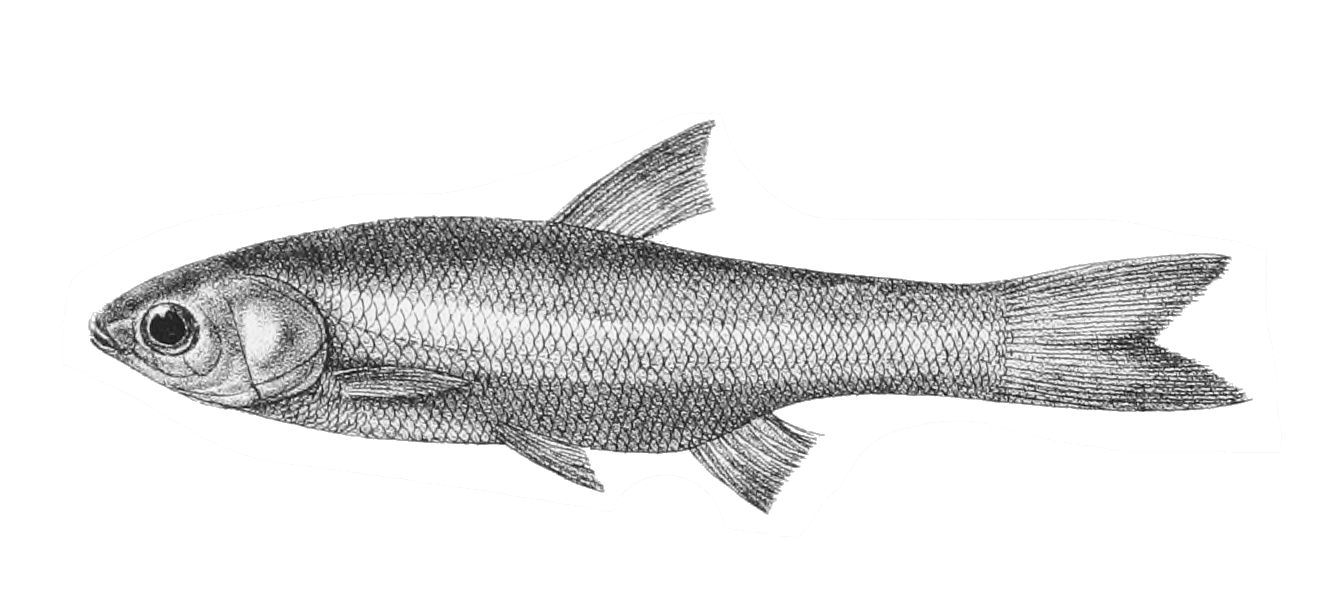

Conservation status
- Least Concern (IUCN 3.1)

Scientific classification
- Kingdom: Animalia
- Phylum: Chordata
- Class: Actinopterygii
- Order: Cypriniformes
- Family: Danionidae
- Subfamily: Rasborinae
- Genus: Amblypharyngodon
- Species: A. microlepis

Binomial name
- Amblypharyngodon microlepis (Bleeker, 1854)

Synonyms
- Leuciscus microlepis Bleeker, 1854

= Indian carplet =

Species of fish

The Indian carplet (Amblypharyngodon microlepis) is a species of carplet in the family Danionidae. It is found in India and Bangladesh.
