= Rheostura kloetzliae =

Conservation status
- Data Deficient (IUCN 3.1)

Scientific classification
- Kingdom: Animalia
- Phylum: Chordata
- Class: Actinopterygii
- Division: Teleostei
- Order: Cypriniformes
- Family: Nemacheilidae
- Genus: Rheostura
- Species: R. kloetzliae

Binomial name
- Rheostura kloetzliae (Kottelat, 2000)

Synonyms
- Schistura kloetzliae Kotttelat, 2000

Species of fish

Rheostura kloetzliae is a species of freshwater ray-finned fish belonging to the family Nemacheilidae, the stone loaches. It has been recorded from the Mengla drainage in Yunnan and its tributary Nam Youan in Luang Namtha province in Laos. It occurs in medium fast currents in streams with gravel or stony bottoms. The specific name honours Antoinette Kottelat-Kloetzli, for her help and support of Maurice Kottelat during his work in Laos, among other things.

Rheostura kloetzliae can reach 5 cm (2.0 in) in standard length.
