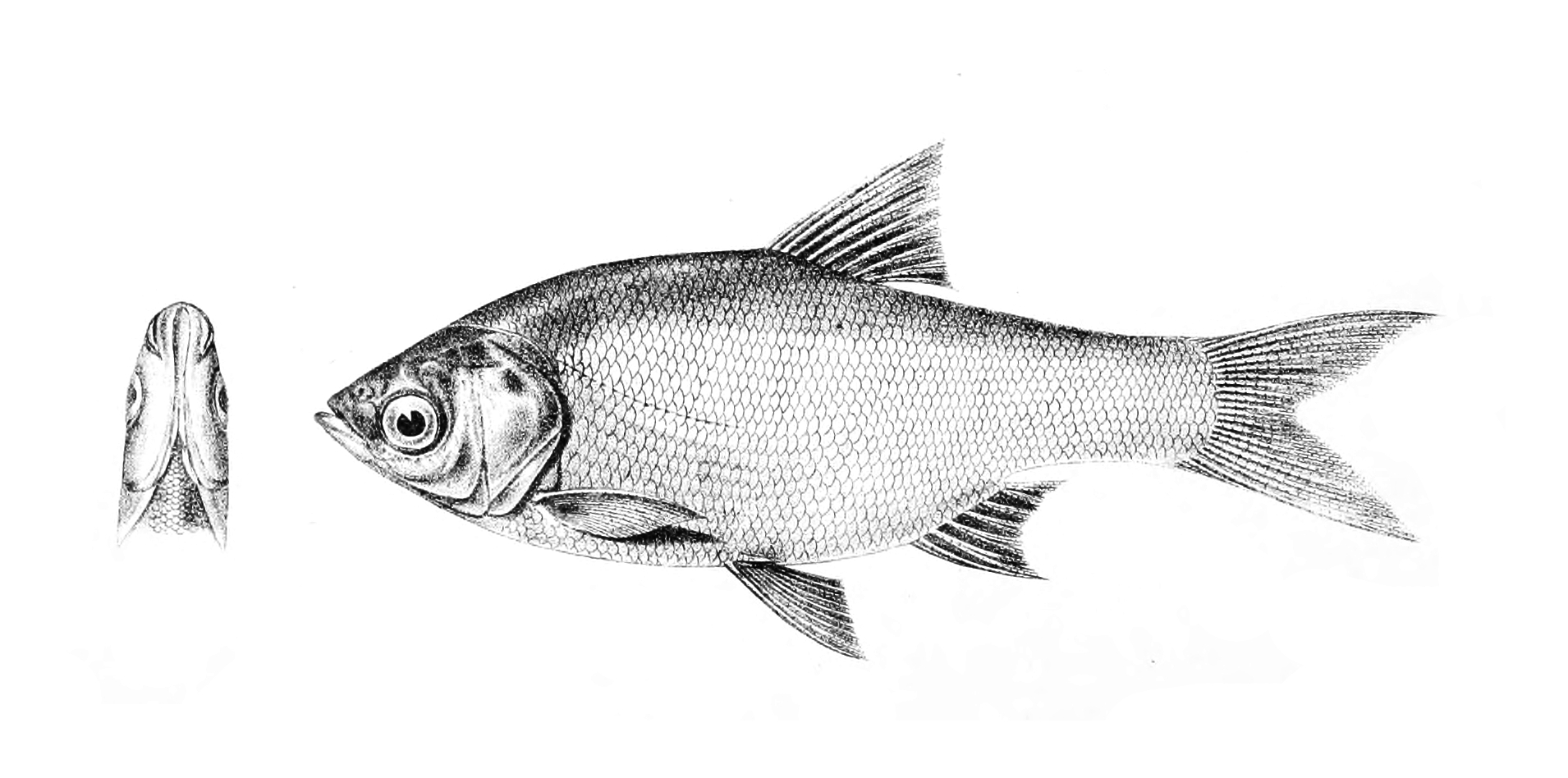
- Amblypharyngodon atkinsonii
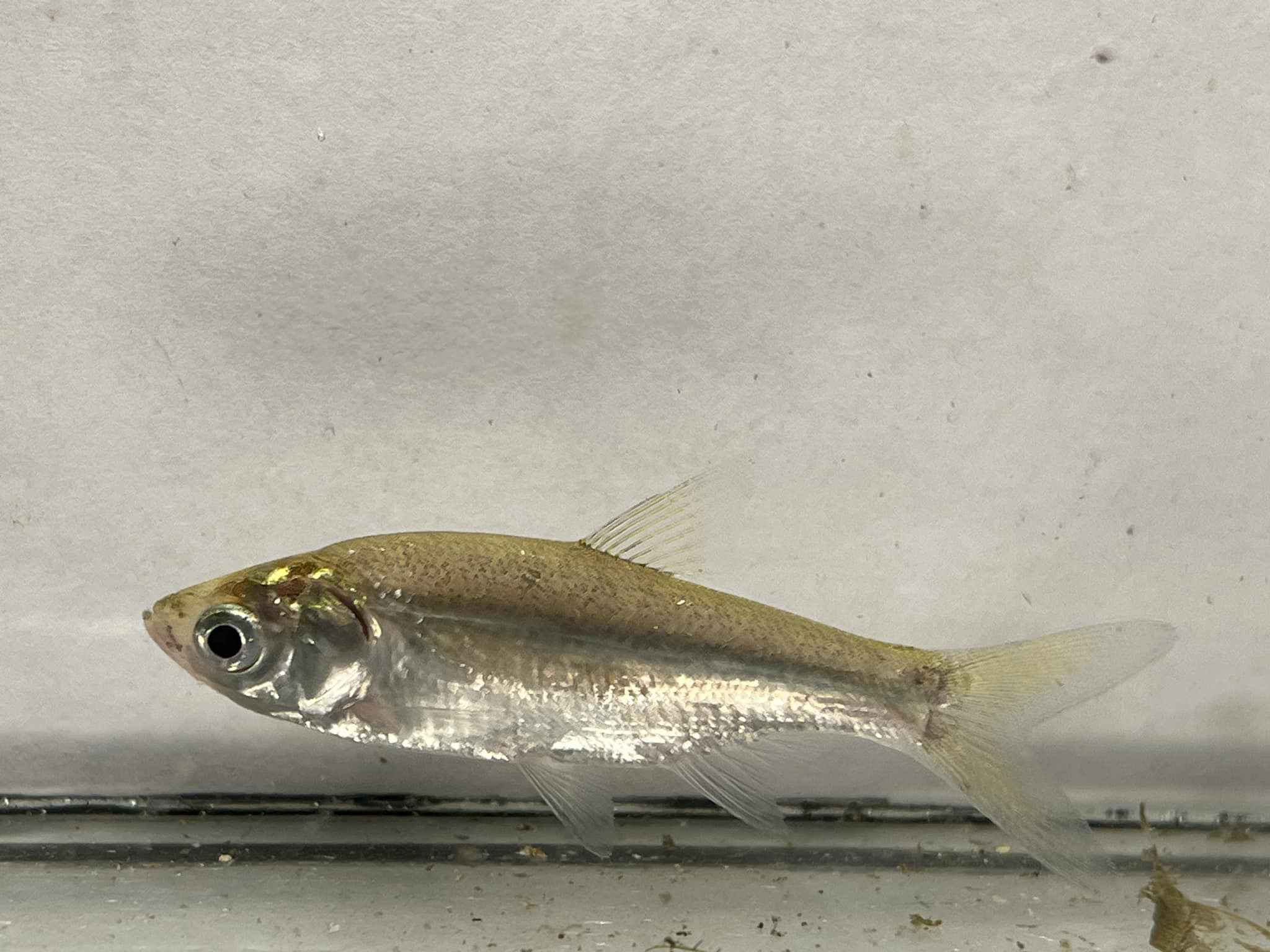

Conservation status
- Least Concern (IUCN 3.1)

Scientific classification
- Kingdom: Animalia
- Phylum: Chordata
- Class: Actinopterygii
- Order: Cypriniformes
- Family: Danionidae
- Subfamily: Rasborinae
- Genus: Amblypharyngodon
- Species: A. atkinsonii

Binomial name
- Amblypharyngodon atkinsonii (Blyth, 1860)

Synonyms
- Leuciscus harengula (Valenciennes, 1844); Mola atkinsonii (Blyth, 1860)

= Burmese carplet =

Species of fish

The Burmese carplet (Amblypharyngodon atkinsonii), is a species of carplet belonging to the family Danionidae. It is found in the Ayeyarwady, Sittaung, and lower Salween rivers in Myanmar.

== Etymology ==
The fish is named in honor of Irish entomologist Edwin Thomas Atkinson (1840–1890), who in 1862 joined the Indian Civil Service which madeit possible to make many natural history collections in India and Southeast Asia.
