= Oreoglanis delacouri =

Scientific classification
- Domain: Eukaryota
- Kingdom: Animalia
- Phylum: Chordata
- Class: Actinopterygii
- Order: Siluriformes
- Family: Sisoridae
- Genus: Oreoglanis
- Species: O. delacouri

Binomial name
- Oreoglanis delacouri (Pellegrin, 1936)

Synonyms
- Paroreoglanis delacouri Pellegrin, 1936

Fish species

Oreoglanis delacouri is a species of catfish in the family Sisoridae found in Laos and China.

== Size ==
This species reaches a length of 12.3 cm (4.8 in).

== Etymology ==
The fish is named in honor of French-American ornithologist Jean Theodore Delacour (1890–1985), who collected the holotype specimen.
