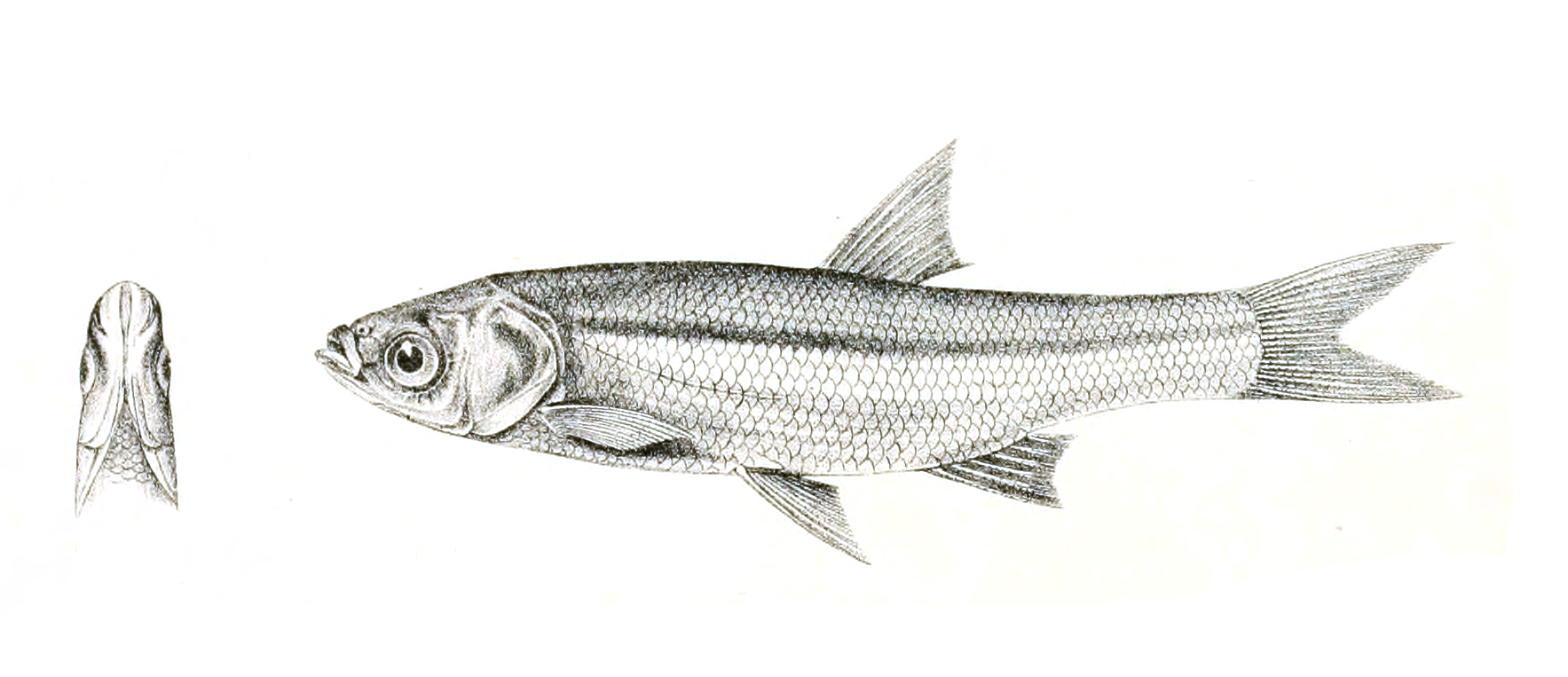

Conservation status
- Least Concern (IUCN 3.1)

Scientific classification
- Kingdom: Animalia
- Phylum: Chordata
- Class: Actinopterygii
- Order: Cypriniformes
- Family: Danionidae
- Subfamily: Rasborinae
- Genus: Amblypharyngodon
- Species: A. melettinus

Binomial name
- Amblypharyngodon melettinus (Valenciennes, 1844)

Synonyms
- Leuciscus melettina Valenciennes, 1844; Amblypharyngodon chakaiensis Babu Rao & Nair, 1978; Brachygramma jerdonii Day, 1865; Rhodeus indicus Jerdon, 1849

= Attentive carplet =

Species of fish

The attentive carplet or silver carplet (Amblypharyngodon melettinus) is a species of carplet in the family Danionidae. It is found in freshwater streams, ponds and rivers of India.

== Etymology ==
The generic name comes from Greek, "amblys" means "darkness" and Greek name "pharyngx" for "pharynx" with "odous" means "teeth".
