= Papilla (fish anatomy) =

Small lumps of dermal tissue found in fish

The papilla, in certain kinds of fish, particularly rays, sharks, and catfish, are small lumps of dermal tissue found in the mouth, where they are "distributed uniformly on the tongue, palate, and pharynx". They "project slightly above the surrounding multi-layered epithelium", and the taste buds of the fish are "situated along the crest or at the apex of the papillae".

Unlike humans, fish have little or nothing in the way of a tongue, and those that have such an organ do not use it for tasting, but merely for cushioning the mouth and manipulating things within it. The papillae of the fish, and the taste buds found on them, are therefore located on the interior or exterior surfaces of the mouth. Most typically, these are found on the floor of the mouth, or on the upper lip.
