= Chavalit Vidthayanon =

Thai ichthyologist

Chavalit Vidthayanon (Thai: ชวลิต วิทยานนท์; born August 15, 1959 in Bangkok) is a Thai ichthyologist and senior biodiversity researcher at WWF Thailand. He completed his secondary education at Bangkok Christian College before earning degrees in marine biology from Kasetsart University and Chulalongkorn University. He later received a Ph.D. in fishery biology from Tokyo Fisheries University (now Tokyo University of Marine Science and Technology), Japan.

He has conducted aquatic biodiversity research in Southeast Asia since 1983, collaborating with renowned ichthyologists both in Thailand and abroad, including Kittipong Jaruthanin, T. R. Roberts, H. H. Ng, and Maurice Kottelat. His work has significantly advanced the taxonomy and identification of newly discovered freshwater fish species, many from the Mekong Basin. Notable species he has described include Amblypharyngodon chulabhornae, Himantura kittipongi, Pangasius conchophilus, P. myanmar, Pao palustris, Pseudeutropius indigens, and Schistura pridii. His expertise lies particularly in Thai freshwater catfish.

In addition to his research, Vidthayanon lectures in zoology and ichthyology at academic institutions across Thailand, including Chulalongkorn University, Kasetsart University, and Mahasarakham University.

== See also ==
- Category:Taxa named by Chavalit Vidthayanon
