= Heok Hee Ng =

Singaporean ichthyologist

Heok Hee Ng is a Singaporean ichthyologist and researcher of biodiversity at the Lee Kong Chian Natural History Museum of the National University of Singapore. He specialises in Asian catfish systematics with particular focus on sisoroid catfishes. As of 2018, Ng authored 14 species of Siluriformes

== Publications ==
Ng has (co-)authored many publications. See Wikispecies below.

== Taxon described by him ==
- See Category:Taxa named by Heok Hee Ng
