= Alburnus istanbulensis =

Conservation status
- Least Concern (IUCN 3.1)

Scientific classification
- Kingdom: Animalia
- Phylum: Chordata
- Class: Actinopterygii
- Order: Cypriniformes
- Family: Leuciscidae
- Subfamily: Leuciscinae
- Genus: Alburnus
- Species: A. istanbulensis

Binomial name
- Alburnus istanbulensis Battalgil, 1941

Synonyms
- Alburnus (Chalcalburnus) chalcoides istanbulensis Battagil, 1941

Species of fish

Alburnus istanbulensis, the Marmara shemaya, is a species of ray-finned fish belonging to the family Leuciscidae, which includes the minnows, daces and related fishes. It is endemic to Turkey, where it is found in coastal streams of European Turkey and Western Anatolia.

== Taxonomy ==
Alburnus istanbulensis was first formally described as Alburnus (Chalcalburnus) chalcoides istanbulensis in 1941 by the Turkish ichthyologist Fahire Battalgil with its type locality given as the Kağıthane stream, draining to the Bosphorus "River", near Istanbul in Turkey. This taxon has been treated as a synonym of the Danube bleak (A. chalcoides) and of A. mento but is now regarded as a valid species. This species is classified as a member of the genus Alburnus, the bleaks, within the subfamily Leuciscinae of the family Leuciscidae.

== Etymology ==
Alburnus istanbulensis belongs to the genus Alburnus a name derived from the Latin for whitefish but it also refers to the bleak, a name which means pale in English, in reference to the pale non lustrous colour of A. alburnus. The specific name, istanbulensis, means "belonging to Istanbul", the type locality being in the vicinity of the city of Istanbul.

== Description ==
Alburnus istanbulensis is distinguished from related species around the Aegean and Black Seas by the origin of the anal fin being about 1/2 to 1 1/2 scales behind the base of the dorsal fin; by the lateral line having between 57 and 63 pored scales; the anal fin has between 13 and 15 1/2 branched rays; in breeding fish the bases of the pectoral and pelvic fins are hyaline or grey; the ventral keel is exposed with 8 to 12 scales in front of the anus; the caudal peduncle has a depth of around twice its length; and breeding males develop a few, large tubercles. The Marmara shemaya has a maximum standard length of 18 cm (7.1 in).

== Distribution and habitat ==
Alburnoides istanbulensis is nearly endemic to the Marmara region of Turkey, where it is found in coastal river systems draining to the Black Sea, Sea of Marmara and Aegean Sea basins. In the Black Sea, it occurs from the Papuç River east to the Sakarya River, while along the northern coast of the Sea of Marmara it occurs in the Alibey, Kâğıthane and Karasudere rivers near Istanbul. It is also found in rivers draining to the Sea of Marmara throughout its southern coastline, as well as in the Biga Peninsula where this species is known from a afew river systems draining into the Aegean Sea, with the Tuzla River being the southern limit of its distribution. The Marmara shemaya is found in rivers and lakes, where it forages near the surface. In the spawning season these fishes migrate to the upper reaches of the smaller tributaries to spawn in riffles over fine substrata, like gravel.
