= Beyşehir bleak =

Conservation status
- Extinct (2006) (IUCN 3.1)

Scientific classification
- Kingdom: Animalia
- Phylum: Chordata
- Class: Actinopterygii
- Order: Cypriniformes
- Family: Leuciscidae
- Genus: Alburnus
- Species: †A. akili

Binomial name
- †Alburnus akili Battalgil, 1942
- Lake Beyşehir is located on the eastern frontier of Isparta Province

Extinct species of ray-finned fish

The Beyşehir bleak (Alburnus akili), known in Turkish as gökçe balığı, is an extinct species of freshwater fish in the family Leuciscidae, .

The Beyşehir bleak was endemic to Lake Beyşehir in Central Anatolia, Turkey. It declined after the introduction of Sander lucioperca (zander or pikeperch) into the lake in 1955, and the introduction of A. escherichii. Overfishing also seems to have contributed to the extinction. The fish was last seen in 1998 and is now listed as extinct by the IUCN.

This was a short-lived species and only grew to 1.5 cm (0.59 in) long.
