= Alburnus danubicus =

Conservation status
- Extinct (yes) (IUCN 3.1)

Scientific classification
- Kingdom: Animalia
- Phylum: Chordata
- Class: Actinopterygii
- Division: Teleostei
- Order: Cypriniformes
- Family: Leuciscidae
- Subfamily: Leuciscinae
- Genus: Alburnus
- Species: †A. danubicus

Binomial name
- †Alburnus danubicus Antipa, 1909

Extinct species of fish

Alburnus danubicus is an extinct species of ray-finned fish belonging to the family Leuciscidae, which includes the minnows, daces and related fishes. It was known to inhabit coastal lakes in Romania and the Danube River in Romania and Bulgaria. It is considered extinct and has not been recorded since 1943.

In 2019, a somewhat mysterious specimen was caught in the Danube River, at Petrovaradin, in Serbia. It is considered to have possibly beenAlburnus danubicus, making its status as an extinct species open for reevaluation. Alternatively, it might have been an individual of Alburnus mento that moved down on the river very far from its native area in Upper Austria. The specimen was released alive after being photographed.

This species was found in temperate, benthopelagic, freshwater. Distinguishable by its branched anal-fin rays and lateral line scales.

Alburnus danubicus was first formally described in 1909 by the Romanian zoologist Grigore Antipa with its distribution range given as several localities in the Danube Delta of Romania. This taxon was regarded as a synonym of the Danube bleak (A. chalcoides) or of the lake bleak (A. mento) but is now thought to have been a valid species. This species is classified as a member of the genus Alburnus, a genus in which many of the fishes share the English common name of bleak, within the subfamily Leuciscinae of the family Leuciscidae.

Alburnus danubicus belongs to the genus Alburnus a name derived from the Latin for whitefish but it also refers to the bleak, a name which means pale in English, in reference to the pale non lustrous colour of A. alburnus. The specific name, danubicus, means "belonging to the Danube", this taxon originally has been described as a variety of the Danube bleak found in the Danube Delta.
