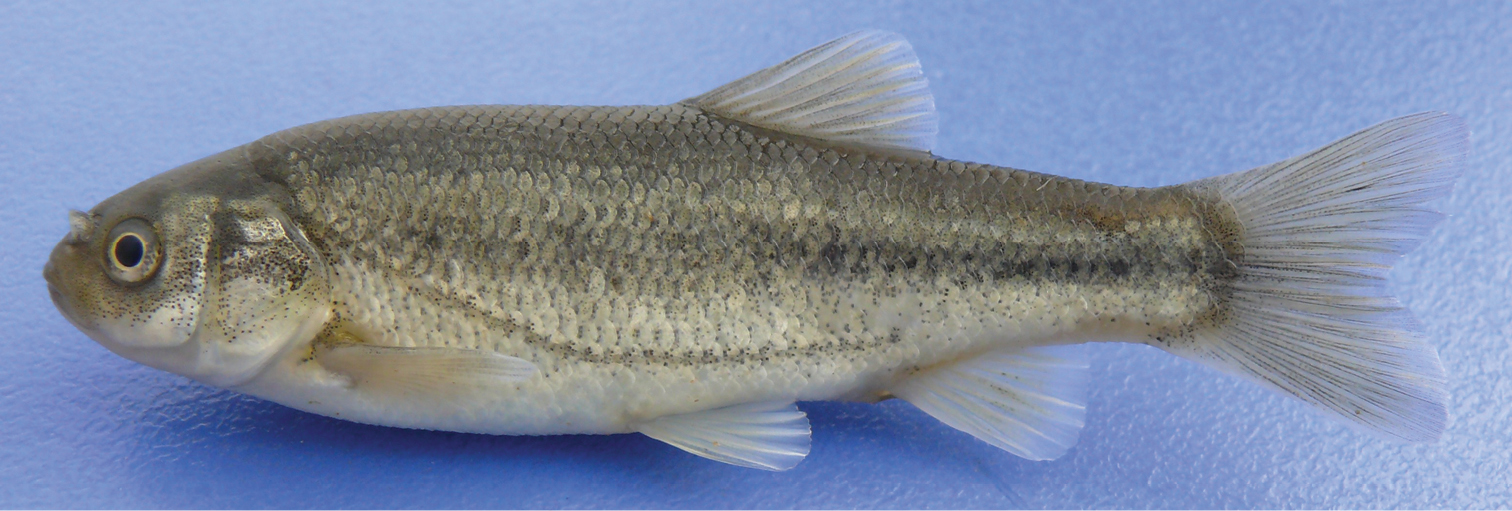
- Burdur spring minnow, (Pseudophoxinus burduricus)

Scientific classification
- Kingdom: Animalia
- Phylum: Chordata
- Class: Actinopterygii
- Order: Cypriniformes
- Family: Leuciscidae
- Subfamily: Leuciscinae
- Genus: Pseudophoxinus; Bleeker, 1860

Type species
- Phoxinellus zeregi Heckel, 1843

Synonyms
- Pararhodeus Berg, 1907; Spinophoxinellus M. S. Karaman (sr), 1972

= Pseudophoxinus =

Genus of fishes

Pseudophoxinus is a genus of ray-finned fish belonging to the subfamily Leuciscinae of the family Leuciscidae, which includes the daces, Eurasian minnows and related species. These fishes are found in Western Asia.

== Species ==
Pseudophoxinus contains the following valid species:

- Pseudophoxinus alii Küçük, 2007 (Pamphylian spring minnow)
- Pseudophoxinus anatolicus (Hankó (hu), 1925) (Anatolian minnow, giant spring minnow)
- Pseudophoxinus antalyae Bogutskaya, 1992 (Antalya spring minnow)
- Pseudophoxinus battalgilae Bogutskaya, 1997 (Tuz Lake spring minnow, Beysehir minnow)
- Pseudophoxinus burduricus Küçük, Gülle, Güçlü, Çiftçi & Erdoğan, 2013 (Burdur spring minnow)
- Pseudophoxinus caralis (Battalgil, 1942)
- Pseudophoxinus cilicicus Saç, Özuluğü, Geiger & Freyhof, 2019
- Pseudophoxinus crassus (Ladiges, 1960) (Fat spring minnow)
- Pseudophoxinus drusensis (Pellegrin, 1933) (Drusian spring minnow)
- Pseudophoxinus elizavetae Bogutskaya, Küçük & Atalay, 2006 (Sultan Sazlığı minnow)
- Pseudophoxinus evliyae Freyhof & Özuluğ, 2010 (Lycian spring minnow)
- Pseudophoxinus fahrettini Freyhof & Özuluğ, 2010 (Pisidian spring minnow)
- Pseudophoxinus firati Bogutskaya, Küçük & Atalay, 2006 (Euphrates spring minnow)
- Pseudophoxinus handlirschi (Pietschmann, 1933) (Handlirsch’s minnow)
- Pseudophoxinus hasani Krupp, 1992 (Marqīyah spring minnow)
- Pseudophoxinus hittitorum Freyhof & Özuluğ, 2010 (Hittitic spring minnow)
- Pseudophoxinus iconii Küçük, Gülle & Güçlü, 2016
- Pseudophoxinus kervillei (Pellegrin, 1911) (Orontes minnow)
- Pseudophoxinus libani (Lortet, 1883) (Levantine minnow)
- Pseudophoxinus maeandri (Ladiges), 1960) (Apamean spring minnow)
- Pseudophoxinus maeandricus (Ladiges, 1960) (Sandıklı spring minnow, Menderes brook minnow)
- Pseudophoxinus mehmeti Ekmekçi, Atalay, Yoğurtçuoğlu, Turan & Küçük, 2015
- Pseudophoxinus ninae Freyhof & Özuluğ, 2006 (Onaç spring minnow)
- Pseudophoxinus syriacus (Lortet, 1883) (Barada spring minnow)
- Pseudophoxinus turani Küçük & Güçlü, 2014 (Turan's spring minnow)
- Pseudophoxinus zekayi Bogutskaya, Küçük & Atalay, 2006 (Ceyhan spring minnow)
- Pseudophoxinus zeregi (Heckel, 1843) (Levantine spring minnow)
