= Apamean spring minnow =

Conservation status
- Endangered (IUCN 3.1)

Scientific classification
- Kingdom: Animalia
- Phylum: Chordata
- Class: Actinopterygii
- Order: Cypriniformes
- Family: Leuciscidae
- Subfamily: Leuciscinae
- Genus: Pseudophoxinus
- Species: P. maeandri

Binomial name
- Pseudophoxinus maeandri (Ladiges, 1960)

Synonyms
- Pararhodeus maeandri Ladiges, 1960

Species of fish

The Apamean spring minnow (Pseudophoxinus maeandri) is a species of freshwater ray-finned fish belonging to the family Leuciscidae, which includes the daces, Eurasian minnows and related species. It is found only in Turkey. Its natural habitats are rivers and freshwater lakes. It is threatened by habitat loss.
