= Alburnus mentoides =

Conservation status
- Endangered (IUCN 3.1)

Scientific classification
- Kingdom: Animalia
- Phylum: Chordata
- Class: Actinopterygii
- Order: Cypriniformes
- Family: Leuciscidae
- Genus: Alburnus
- Species: A. mentoides

Binomial name
- Alburnus mentoides Kessler, 1859

Synonyms
- Chalcalburnus chalcoides mentoides (Kessler, 1859)

Species of fish

Alburnus mentoides, also known as the Crimean shemaya, is a species of ray-finned fish in the genus Alburnus that is endemic to Crimea in Ukraine.

== Taxonomy ==
The species was described as Chalcalburnus chalcoides mentoides by the ichthyologist Karl Kessler in 1859. The name of its current genus, Alburnus is derived from the Latin for whitefish, but also refers to the bleak, a name which means pale in English, in reference to the pale, non-lustrous colour of A. alburnus. The specific name, mentoides, adds the suffix oides-, meaning "form" or "shape", as Kessler described this species as being similar to A. mento.

== Description ==
The Crimean shemaya grows to a standard length of up to 13 centimetres (5.1 in). It can be distinguished from other Alburnus species that occur in the Black Sea by the following characteristics: the body has a faint dark line along the middle of the sides; the anal fin has 13–14.5 branched rays and originates 0.5 to 1.5 scales behind the last branched dorsal ray; there are 58–69 + 4 scales on the lateral line; there are 18–25 gill rakes; the ventral keel is exposed for 8 to 10 scales in front of the anus; the depth of the caudal peduncle is 1.7–1.9 times its length; and nuptial males have a limited number of large tubercles.

== Distribution and ecology ==
The Crimean shemaya is endemic to southern Crimea, where it is found in middle and lower portions of the Bel'bek and Al'ma rivers, and two man-made impoundments on the Chornaya River. Its preferred habitats are the lower portions of rivers, alongside artificial habitats like reservoirs and canals.

Crimean shemayas feed on zooplankton, invertebrates, and arthropods that fall into the water, hunting near the surface of the water. Foraging takes place in small streams. Adults begin breeding after three years and can live as long as five years. The breeding season lasts from June to July. Adults migrate to the upper reaches of the river to lay eggs in riffles in gravel beds with heavy currents. The Crimean shemaya is known to hybridise with the European chub.

== Conservation ==
It is listed as being endangered on the IUCN Red List due to its small range and ongoing habitat degradation. It has been declining in population in the Bel'bek and Chornaya rivers. Threats to the species include dams blocking its migratory routes, water abstraction causing a decrease in suitable habitat for laying eggs, and water pollution. It is listed in Annex III of the Bern Convention, but is not known from any protected areas.
