= Manyas shemaya =

Conservation status
- Endangered (IUCN 3.1)

Scientific classification
- Kingdom: Animalia
- Phylum: Chordata
- Class: Actinopterygii
- Order: Cypriniformes
- Family: Leuciscidae
- Subfamily: Leuciscinae
- Genus: Alburnus
- Species: A. carinatus

Binomial name
- Alburnus carinatus Battalgil, 1941

Synonyms
- Alburnus chalcoides carinatus Battalgil, 1941

Species of fish

The Manyas shemaya (Alburnus carinatus) is a species of freshwater ray-finned fish belonging to the family Leuciscidae, in the subfamily Leuciscinae. It is endemic to Lake Kuş (Manyas Lake) and Lake Uluabat and their tributaries in Turkey, both which are under environmental pressure from pollution and water abstraction. Sedimentation and the introduction of the invasive Prussian carp also impact this species. The IUCN has declared the Manyas shemaya as endangered.

It can grow to 18.1 cm (7.1 in) standard length.
