= Alburnus zagrosensis =

Scientific classification
- Kingdom: Animalia
- Phylum: Chordata
- Class: Actinopterygii
- Order: Cypriniformes
- Family: Leuciscidae
- Subfamily: Leuciscinae
- Genus: Alburnus
- Species: A. zagrosensis

Binomial name
- Alburnus zagrosensis Coad, 2009

Species of fish

Alburnus zagrosensis is a species of cyprinid fish in the genus Alburnus. It is endemic to the Karun River basin in Iran.
