= Alburnus timarensis =

Conservation status
- Critically Endangered (IUCN 3.1)

Scientific classification
- Kingdom: Animalia
- Phylum: Chordata
- Class: Actinopterygii
- Order: Cypriniformes
- Family: Leuciscidae
- Subfamily: Leuciscinae
- Genus: Alburnus
- Species: A. timarensis

Binomial name
- Alburnus timarensis Kuru, 1980

Species of fish

Alburnus timarensis is a species of ray-finned fish belonging to the family Leuciscidae. This fish is endemic to a single stream in the Lake Van basin in eastern Turkey. The species was considered a synonym of Alburnus tarichi, but was revealed to be a separate species.
