= P. syriacus =

P. syriacus may refer to:

- Pelobates syriacus, the eastern spadefoot or Syrian spadefoot, a toad species native to Eastern Europe and Western Asia
- Pseudophoxinus syriacus, a fish species found only in Lebanon
