= Pseudophoxinus maeandricus =

Conservation status
- Critically Endangered (IUCN 3.1)

Scientific classification
- Kingdom: Animalia
- Phylum: Chordata
- Class: Actinopterygii
- Order: Cypriniformes
- Family: Leuciscidae
- Subfamily: Leuciscinae
- Genus: Pseudophoxinus
- Species: P. maeandricus

Binomial name
- Pseudophoxinus maeandricus (Ladiges, 1960)

Synonyms
- Acanthorutilus maeandricus Ladiges, 1960

Species of fish

Pseudophoxinus maeandricus is a species of fish in the carp family, Cyprinidae. It is endemic to Turkey, where it is known only from an area near Sandıklı. It is also known as the Sandıklı spring minnow or Menderes brook minnow.

This fish reaches up to about 7.9 centimeters in length. It lives in streams and marshes with thick vegetation. It is considered to be a critically endangered species due to habitat loss.
