= Alburnus orontis =

Conservation status
- Vulnerable (IUCN 3.1)

Scientific classification
- Kingdom: Animalia
- Phylum: Chordata
- Class: Actinopterygii
- Order: Cypriniformes
- Family: Leuciscidae
- Subfamily: Leuciscinae
- Genus: Alburnus
- Species: A. orontis

Binomial name
- Alburnus orontis Sauvage, 1882

Synonyms
- Alburnus kotschyi Steindachner, 1863

Species of fish

Alburnus orontis, also known as the Orontes bleak or Orontes spotted bleak, is a species of ray-finned fish in the family Leuciscidae, that can be found in Syria and Turkey in the drainage basin of the Orontes River. Its natural habitats are rivers and intermittent rivers. It is threatened by habitat loss, pollution, water abstraction and river damming.
