= Pisidian =

Pisidian may refer to:

- Pisidian people
- Pisidian language

== See also ==
- Pisidian spring minnow
