= Mossul bleak =

Scientific classification
- Kingdom: Animalia
- Phylum: Chordata
- Class: Actinopterygii
- Division: Teleostei
- Order: Cypriniformes
- Family: Leuciscidae
- Subfamily: Leuciscinae
- Genus: Alburnus
- Species: A. mossulensis

Binomial name
- Alburnus mossulensis Heckel, 1843

Synonyms
- Alburnus capito Heckel, 1843; Alburnus caudimacula Heckel, 1846-49; Alburnus iblis Heckel, 1846-49; Alburnus megacephalus Heckel, 1846-49; Alburnus mossulensis delineatus Battalgil, 1942; Alburnus schejtan Heckel, 1846-49; Chalcalburnus mossulensis (Heckel, 1843); Leuciscus maxillaris Valenciennes, 1844

Species of fish

The Mossul bleak (Alburnus mossulensis) is a species of ray-finned fish in the genus Alburnus. However, a recent study found that Alburnus mossulensis was probably a synonym of Alburnus sellal.
