= Alburnus selcuklui =

Scientific classification
- Domain: Eukaryota
- Kingdom: Animalia
- Phylum: Chordata
- Class: Actinopterygii
- Order: Cypriniformes
- Family: Cyprinidae
- Subfamily: Leuciscinae
- Genus: Alburnus
- Species: A. selcuklui

Binomial name
- Alburnus selcuklui M. Elp, F. Şen & Özuluğ, 2015

Species of fish

Alburnus selcuklui is a species of ray-finned fish in the genus Alburnus from the headwaters of the Tigris in eastern Anatolia, Turkey.
