= Fat spring minnow =

Conservation status
- Endangered (IUCN 3.1)

Scientific classification
- Kingdom: Animalia
- Phylum: Chordata
- Class: Actinopterygii
- Order: Cypriniformes
- Family: Leuciscidae
- Subfamily: Leuciscinae
- Genus: Pseudophoxinus
- Species: P. crassus

Binomial name
- Pseudophoxinus crassus (Ladiges, 1960)

Synonyms
- Acanthorutilus crassus Ladiges, 1960

Species of fish

The fat spring minnow (Pseudophoxinus crassus) is a species of freshwater ray-finned fish belonging to the family Leuciscidae, which includes the daces, Eurasian minnows and related species. It is endemic to Turkey and inhabits freshwater rivers and intermittent streams. It is threatened by habitat loss.
