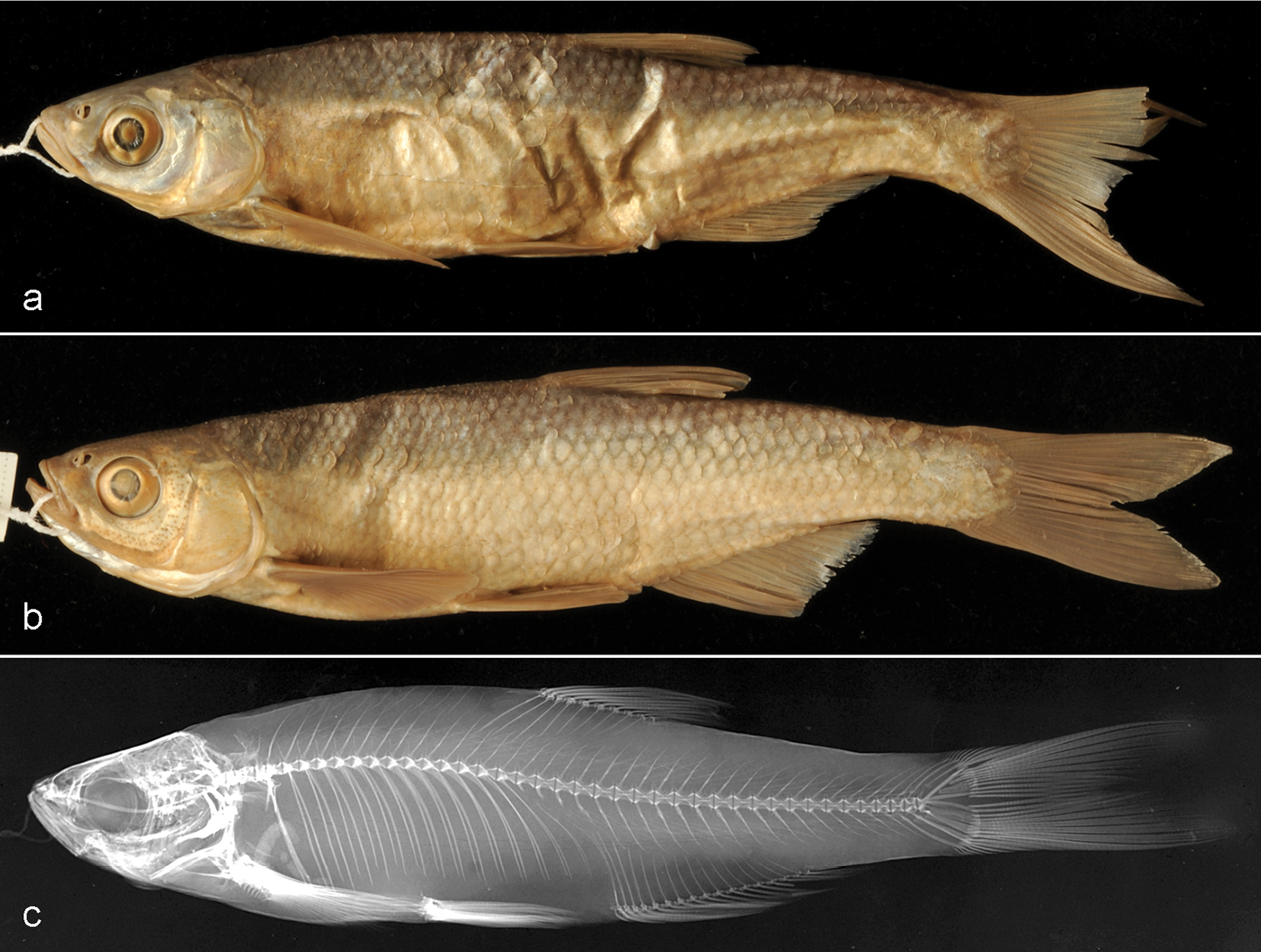

Conservation status
- Least Concern (IUCN 3.1)

Scientific classification
- Kingdom: Animalia
- Phylum: Chordata
- Class: Actinopterygii
- Order: Cypriniformes
- Family: Leuciscidae
- Genus: Alburnus
- Species: A. scoranza

Binomial name
- Alburnus scoranza Bonaparte, 1845

= Alburnus scoranza =

Species of fish

Alburnus scoranza, the Skadar bleak, is a species of ray-finned fish belonging to the family Leuciscidae, which includes the minnows, daces and related fishes. This species occurs only in the basins of Lake Skadar (Liqeni i Shkodrës) in Albania and Montenegro; and in Lake Ohrid in Albania and North Macedonia.

== Taxonomy ==
Alburnus scoranza was first formally described in 1845 by the French biologist and art collector Charles Lucien Bonaparte with its type locality given as Lake Skadar in Montenegro. This taxon has been treated as a synonym of the common bleak (A. alburnus) and of A. mento but is now regarded as a valid species. In some publications the authors of this name are given as Heckel & Kner, 1857. This species is classified as a member of the genus Alburnus, many species of which share the English common name of bleak, within the subfamily Leuciscinae of the family Leuciscidae.

== Etymology ==
Alburnus scoranza belongs to the genus Alburnus a name derived from the Latin for whitefish but it also refers to the bleak, a name which means pale in English, in reference to the pale non lustrous colour of A. alburnus. The specific name, scoranza, is the common name given to this species around Lake Skadar.

== Description ==
Alburnus scoranza is distinguished from related species around the Adriatic Sea in having the origin of the anal fin underneath or immediately to the rear of the base of last branched dorsal fin ray. The lateral line has between 47 and 53 scales along its length. The anal fin has 13 to 14 1/2 branched fin rays. The ventral keel is exposed for two thirds of the distance between the anus and the pelvic fins. There is no faint lateral stripe in living specimens. The Skadar bleak has a maximum total length of 17.9 cm (7.0 in).

== Distribution and habitat ==
Alburnus scoranza is endemic to the Balkans where it is found in Lake Skadar in Albania and Montenegro and in Lake Ohrid in Albania and North Macedonia and the tributaries of these lakes, as far south as northern Greece.

== Biology ==
Alburnus scoranza is a gregarious species that feeds on cladocerans and copepods. For breeding this species lays its eggs in sand, gravel or rocky substrates either in riffles in tributary streams to the lakes or in the shallows, at depths around 30 cm (12 in), near the shore.
