= İznik shemaya =

Conservation status
- Extinct (late 20th century) (IUCN 3.1)

Scientific classification
- Kingdom: Animalia
- Phylum: Chordata
- Class: Actinopterygii
- Order: Cypriniformes
- Family: Leuciscidae
- Subfamily: Leuciscinae
- Genus: Alburnus
- Species: †A. nicaeensis

Binomial name
- †Alburnus nicaeensis Battalgil, 1941

Synonyms
- Alburnus chalcoides nicaeensis Battalgil, 1941

Extinct species of fish

The İznik shemaya (Alburnus nicaeensis) is an extinct species of freshwater ray-finned fish belonging to the family Leuciscidae. This species was endemic to Lake İznik in Turkey. It has not been found since the late 20th century, and is now presumed extinct by the IUCN. It is most likely that this species became extinct with the introduction of the big-scale sand smelt to Lake İznik.
