= Pamphylian spring minnow =

Conservation status
- Endangered (IUCN 3.1)

Scientific classification
- Kingdom: Animalia
- Phylum: Chordata
- Class: Actinopterygii
- Order: Cypriniformes
- Family: Leuciscidae
- Subfamily: Leuciscinae
- Genus: Pseudophoxinus
- Species: P. alii

Binomial name
- Pseudophoxinus alii Küçük, 2007

Species of freshwater fish

The Pamphylian spring minnow (Pseudophoxinus alii) is a species of freshwater ray-finned fish belonging to the family Leuciscidae, which includes the daces, Eurasian minnows and related species. It is found in Ilica and Körmürcüler streams as well as the Karaöz section of Aksu River in Turkey.

== Etymology ==
The fish is named in honor of Ali, Küçük's father.
