= Euphrates spring minnow =

Conservation status
- Endangered (IUCN 3.1)

Scientific classification
- Kingdom: Animalia
- Phylum: Chordata
- Class: Actinopterygii
- Order: Cypriniformes
- Family: Leuciscidae
- Subfamily: Leuciscinae
- Genus: Pseudophoxinus
- Species: P. firati

Binomial name
- Pseudophoxinus firati Bogutskaya, Küçük & Atalay, 2006

Species of fish

The Euphrates spring minnow (Pseudophoxinus firati) is a species of freshwater ray-finned fish belonging to the family Leuciscidae, which includes the daces, Eurasian minnows and related species. It is found in the Euphrates drainage in Turkey.
