= Arsuz bleak =

Conservation status
- Least Concern (IUCN 3.1)

Scientific classification
- Domain: Eukaryota
- Kingdom: Animalia
- Phylum: Chordata
- Class: Actinopterygii
- Order: Cypriniformes
- Family: Leuciscidae
- Subfamily: Leuciscinae
- Genus: Alburnus
- Species: A. kotschyi

Binomial name
- Alburnus kotschyi Battalgil, 1941

Species of fish

The Arsuz bleak (Alburnus kotschyi) is a species of freshwater fish in the family Leuciscidae. This fish is found in rivers draining into the Gulf of İskenderun, including the Seyhan River and Ceyhan River in Turkey.
