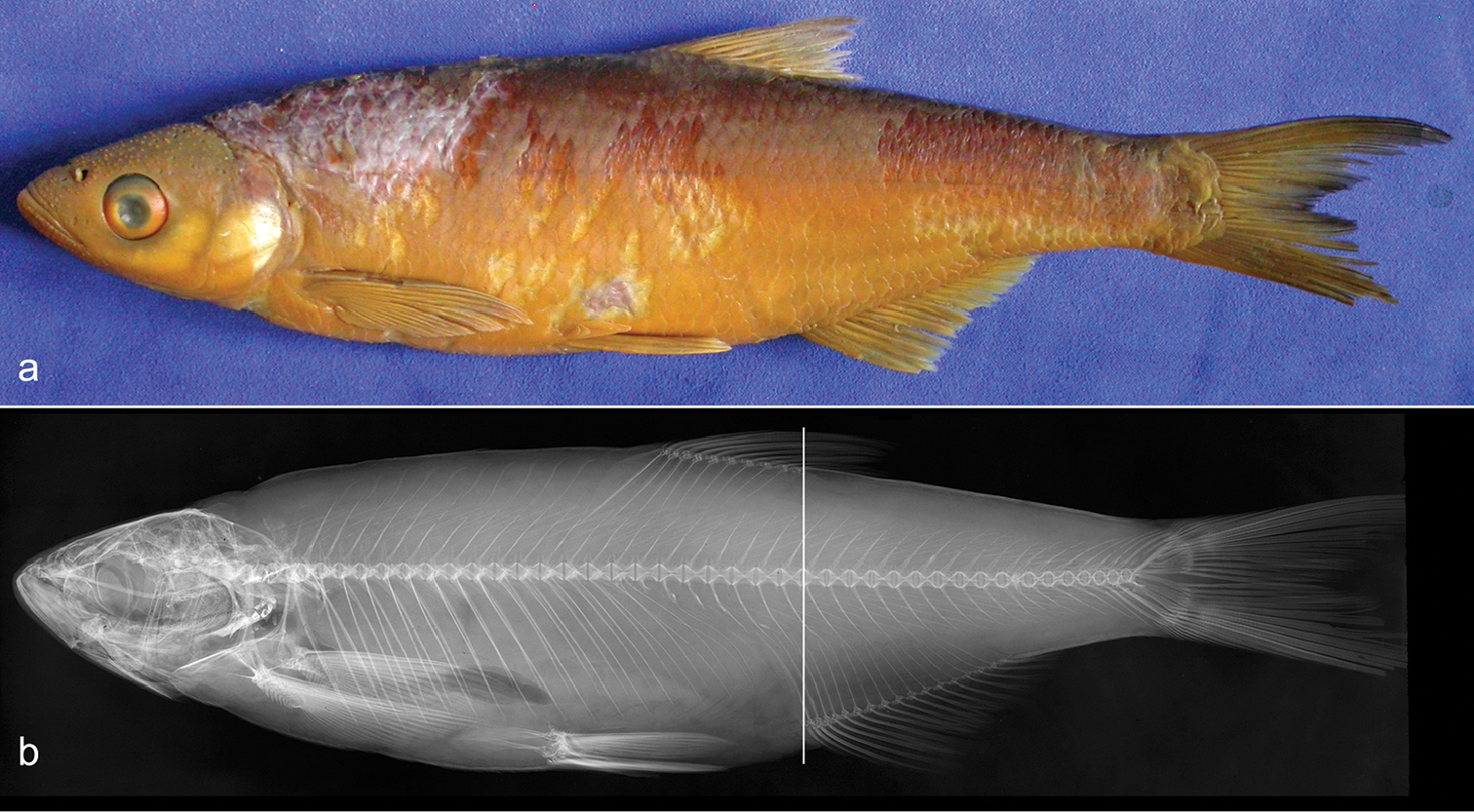

Conservation status
- Endangered (IUCN 3.1)

Scientific classification
- Kingdom: Animalia
- Phylum: Chordata
- Class: Actinopterygii
- Order: Cypriniformes
- Family: Leuciscidae
- Genus: Alburnus
- Species: A. sarmaticus

Binomial name
- Alburnus sarmaticus Freyhof & Kottelat, 2007

= Alburnus sarmaticus =

Species of fish

Alburnus sarmaticus is a species of ray-finned fish in the genus Alburnus. Widespread in European rivers: Southern Bug, Dnieper, Danube (in Romania, Ukraine and Bulgaria); River Kolpa, an upper tributary to the River Sava in Croatia and Slovenia. Almost extirpated in Danube, to be probably survived only in River Kolpa.
