= Alburnus doriae =

Scientific classification
- Kingdom: Animalia
- Phylum: Chordata
- Class: Actinopterygii
- Order: Cypriniformes
- Family: Leuciscidae
- Subfamily: Leuciscinae
- Genus: Alburnus
- Species: A. doriae

Binomial name
- Alburnus doriae De Filippi, 1865

Synonyms
- Alburnus maculatus Keyserling, 1861; Petroleuciscus esfahani Coad & Bogutskaya, 2010; Alburnus amirkabiri Mousavi-Sabet, Vatandoust, Khataminejad, Eagderi, Abbasi, Nasri, Jouladeh & Vasil'eva, 2015

Species of fish

Alburnus doriae is a species of freshwater ray-finned fish belonging to the family Leuciscidae. This species is from Iran, where it was previously thought to be restricted to central Iran, but recent research shows that it is more widespread and that Alburnus amirkabiri and Petroleuciscus esfahani are probably synonyms of Alburnus doriae.

== Description ==
Alburnus doriae is a fish with a slender body that shows marked lateral compression with as lightly convex or straight dorsal profile. It has a pointed snout and the lower jaw normally projects beyond the upper jaw, with the snout being at least as long as the diameter of the eye and equal to the interorbital distance, and the interorbital area is concave. The mouth points upwards. The maximum standard length is 134 mm. The back is dark olive-brown through to grey in colour with silver on the flanks, belly, and lower part of the head; a dark grey strip runs from the back of the eye to the caudal peduncle with darker brown spots below and above the lateral line. The fins lack colour apart from the bases of the pectoral fins and pelvic fins, which are orange.

== Distribution ==
Alburnus doriae is endemic to Iran, where it is found in two endorheic drainage basins, that of the Zayandeh River close to the city of Ishfahan and in the Qom and Gareh-Chai Rivers, which are tributaries of the salt lake, Namak, It has also been recorded from the stream known as Shahrekord, which flows into the Karun River, the lowermost tributary of the Tigris.

== Naming ==
Alburnus doriae was described by Italian zoologist Filippo de Filippi in 1865 from specimens collected by Giacomo Doria in 1862 from "around Shiraz". The specific name honours Doria.
