= Antalya bleak =

Conservation status
- Endangered (IUCN 3.1)

Scientific classification
- Kingdom: Animalia
- Phylum: Chordata
- Class: Actinopterygii
- Order: Cypriniformes
- Family: Leuciscidae
- Subfamily: Leuciscinae
- Genus: Alburnus
- Species: A. baliki

Binomial name
- Alburnus baliki Bogutskaya, Küçük & Ünlü, 2000

Species of fish

The Antalya bleak (Alburnus baliki) is a species of ray-finned fish in the genus Alburnus. It is endemic to Turkey and is commonly found in schools in clear, vegetated fresh water.

== Description ==
The Antalya bleak is similar in appearance to other members of its genus, Alburnus. In addition, it has 12 dorsal rays, 16-18 anal rays and 36-38 vertebra. The longest known specimen was 6.1 cm long.

== Distribution and habitat ==
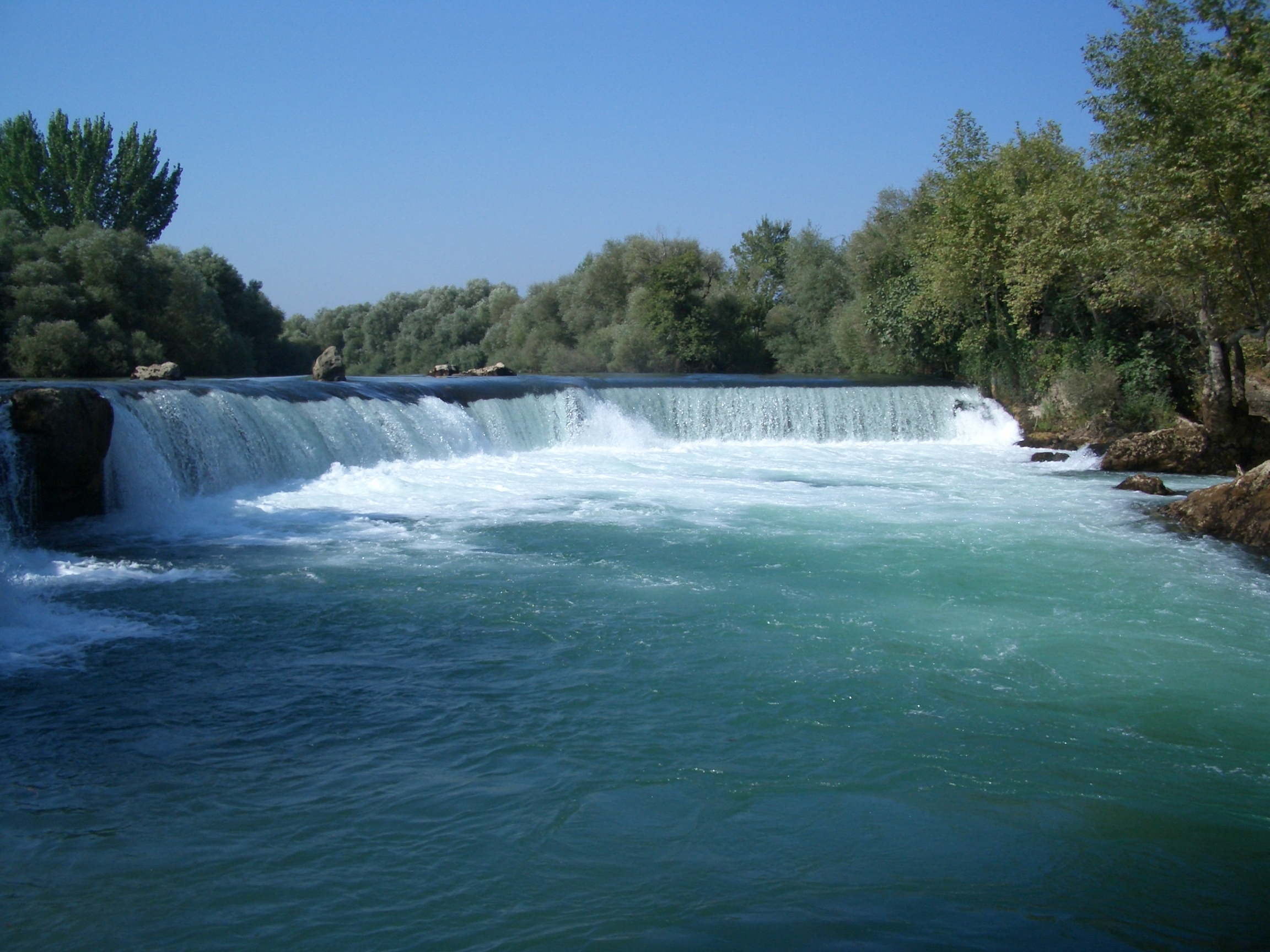
Manavgat River flowing over the Manavgat Waterfall

The Antalya bleak is endemic to Turkey and was discovered in 2000 in the Manavgat River system. Shoals of the fish were found near the surface along the river's banks, where the current was slow and the river was densely vegetated, with a pH range around 6.5. This fish is known from 4 streams draining into the Gulf of Antalya, from the Aksu River in the east to the Mangat River in the west. It may also be present in the Ceyhan River. Three of the four rivers it is endemic to have been modified by hydroelectric dams and pollution.
