= Alburnus macedonicus =

Conservation status
- Critically Endangered (IUCN 3.1)

Scientific classification
- Kingdom: Animalia
- Phylum: Chordata
- Class: Actinopterygii
- Order: Cypriniformes
- Family: Leuciscidae
- Subfamily: Leuciscinae
- Genus: Alburnus
- Species: A. macedonicus

Binomial name
- Alburnus macedonicus S. L. Karaman, 1928

Species of fish

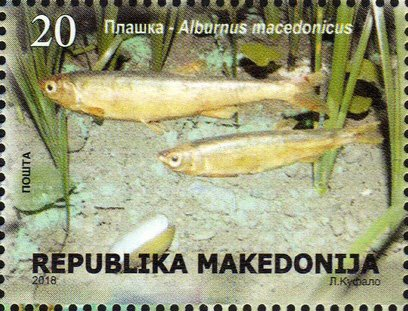
Alburnus macedonicus on a Macedonian stamp

Alburnus macedonicus, the Doiran bleak is a species of freshwater ray-finned fish in the family Leuciscidae. It is endemic to Doiran Lake in Greece and North Macedonia. It is threatened by falling water level in the lake.

It can grow to 14.5 cm (5.7 in) standard length.
