= Pseudophoxinus zeregi =

Conservation status
- Least Concern (IUCN 3.1)

Scientific classification
- Kingdom: Animalia
- Phylum: Chordata
- Class: Actinopterygii
- Order: Cypriniformes
- Family: Leuciscidae
- Subfamily: Leuciscinae
- Genus: Pseudophoxinus
- Species: P. zeregi

Binomial name
- Pseudophoxinus zeregi (Heckel, 1843)

Synonyms
- Phoxinellus zeregi Heckel, 1843

Species of fish

Pseudophoxinus zeregi, also known as the Levantine spring minnow, is a species of freshwater ray-finned fish belonging to the family Leuciscidae, which includes the daces, Eurasian minnows and related species. It is found in Turkey and Syria. Its natural habitat is rivers. This species is threatened by extinction because of rapid habitat loss.
