= Alburnus volviticus =

Conservation status
- Endangered (IUCN 3.1)

Scientific classification
- Kingdom: Animalia
- Phylum: Chordata
- Class: Actinopterygii
- Order: Cypriniformes
- Family: Leuciscidae
- Subfamily: Leuciscinae
- Genus: Alburnus
- Species: A. volviticus

Binomial name
- Alburnus volviticus Freyhof & Kottelat, 2007

Species of fish

Alburnus volviticus, the Volvi bleak, is a species of ray-finned fish in the genus Alburnus, that is endemic to Greece where it occurred in Lake Volvi and Lake Koronia, although it has now been extirpated from the latter.
