= Alburnus thessalicus =

Conservation status
- Least Concern (IUCN 3.1)

Scientific classification
- Kingdom: Animalia
- Phylum: Chordata
- Class: Actinopterygii
- Order: Cypriniformes
- Family: Leuciscidae
- Subfamily: Leuciscinae
- Genus: Alburnus
- Species: A. thessalicus

Binomial name
- Alburnus thessalicus (Stephanidis, 1950)

Synonyms
- Alburnoides thessalicus

Species of fish

Alburnus thessalicus, the Thessaly bleak, is a species of ray-finned fish belonging to the family Leuciscidae. It is a freshwater fish occurring in lakes and streams in Europe. It is found in Albania, Bulgaria, Greece, North Macedonia, and Serbia.

This species is up to 15.5 centimeters long. It inhabits open waters of medium to large rivers, where it forages close to surface.

This is an abundant fish and it is not considered to be a threatened species.
