= Tigris chub =

Conservation status
- Data Deficient (IUCN 3.1)

Scientific classification
- Kingdom: Animalia
- Phylum: Chordata
- Class: Actinopterygii
- Order: Cypriniformes
- Family: Leuciscidae
- Subfamily: Leuciscinae
- Genus: Alburnus
- Species: A. kurui

Binomial name
- Alburnus kurui (Bogutskaya, 1995)

Synonyms
- Leuciscus kurui Bogutskaya, 1995; Squalius kurui (Bogutskaya, 1995); Petroleuciscus kurui (Bogutskaya, 1995)

Species of fish

The Tigris chub (Alburnus kurui) is a species of cyprinid fish endemic to the upper Tigris drainage in southeastern Turkey.
