= Alburnus atropatenae =

Scientific classification
- Kingdom: Animalia
- Phylum: Chordata
- Class: Actinopterygii
- Order: Cypriniformes
- Family: Leuciscidae
- Subfamily: Leuciscinae
- Genus: Alburnus
- Species: A. atropatenae

Binomial name
- Alburnus atropatenae Berg, 1925

Synonyms
- Chalcalburnus atropatenae (Berg 1925); Petroleuciscus atropatenae (Berg 1925)

Species of fish

Alburnus atropatenae, the Urmia bleak, is a species of ray-finned fish belonging to the family Leuciscidae, which includes the minnows, daces and related fishes. This species is found in the Lake Urmia drainage basin in the provinces of East Azerbaijan and West Azerbaijan in Iran, as well as eastern Turkey.

== Taxonomy ==
Alburnus atropatenae was first formally described in 1925 by the Russian ichthyologist Lev Semyonovich Berg with its type locality given as the rivers of Lake Urmia in Iran. This species is classified as a member of the genus Alburnus, the bleaks, within the subfamily Leuciscinae of the family Leuciscidae.
