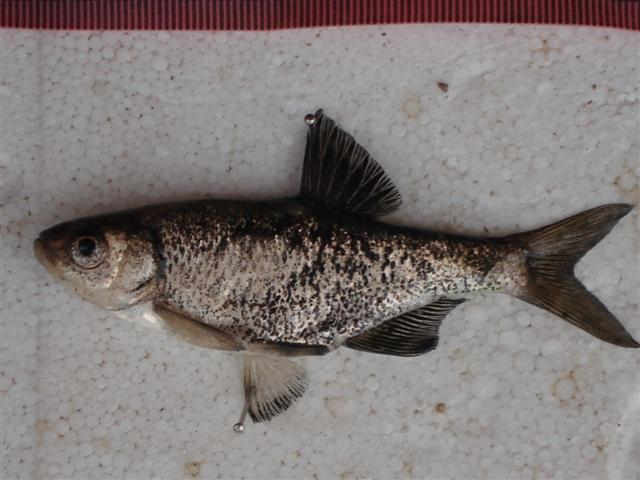

Conservation status
- Least Concern (IUCN 3.1)

Scientific classification
- Kingdom: Animalia
- Phylum: Chordata
- Class: Actinopterygii
- Division: Teleostei
- Order: Cypriniformes
- Family: Leuciscidae
- Subfamily: Leuciscinae
- Genus: Alburnus
- Species: A. caeruleus

Binomial name
- Alburnus caeruleus Heckel, 1843

= Alburnus caeruleus =

Species of fish

Alburnus caeruleus, also known as the black spotted bleak or Tigris bleak, is a species of ray-finned fish belonging to the family Leuciscidae. It is found in the Queiq River drainage and the Tigris–Euphrates river system in Iran, Iraq, Syria and Turkey.
