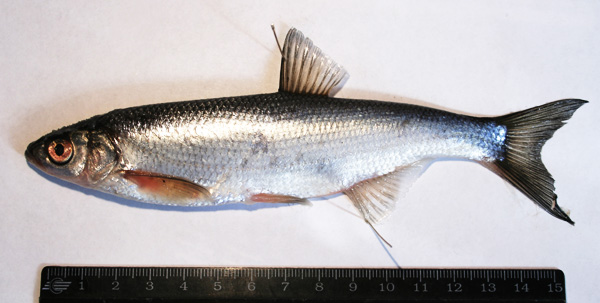
- from the Derkul River (Donets River basin), Ukraine

Conservation status
- Least Concern (IUCN 3.1)

Scientific classification
- Kingdom: Animalia
- Phylum: Chordata
- Class: Actinopterygii
- Order: Cypriniformes
- Family: Leuciscidae
- Subfamily: Leuciscinae
- Genus: Alburnus
- Species: A. leobergi

Binomial name
- Alburnus leobergi Freyhof & Kottelat, 2007

= Alburnus leobergi =

Species of fish

Alburnus leobergi, the Azov shemaya, is a species of ray-finned fish in the genus Alburnus; it is widespread in Eastern Europe in the Sea of Azov basin. A landlocked population exists in Tsimlyansk Reservoir (Don drainage). It is a benthopelagic fish, up to 40.3 cm long.

Landlocked adult populations breed in reservoir tributaries and return to sea after spawning. Populations declined in early and middle 20th century due to the construction of dams. Remaining populations continue to spaw below these dams.
