= Oxynoemacheilus ercisianus =

Conservation status
- Endangered (IUCN 3.1)

Scientific classification
- Kingdom: Animalia
- Phylum: Chordata
- Class: Actinopterygii
- Order: Cypriniformes
- Family: Nemacheilidae
- Genus: Oxynoemacheilus
- Species: O. ercisianus

Binomial name
- Oxynoemacheilus ercisianus (Erk'akan & Kuru, 1986)

Synonyms
- Barbatula pulsiz (Krupp, 1992); Nemacheilus pulsiz Krupp, 1992; Orthrias angorae subsp. ercisianus Erk'akan & Kuru, 1986; Oxynoemacheilus ercisiana (Erk'akan & Kuru, 1986); Paracobitis pulsiz (Krupp, 1992)

Species of fish

Oxynoemacheilus ercisianus, the Van loach, is a species of stone loach endemic to the Lake Van basin in Eastern Turkey.

In 2018, a population of Oxynoemacheilus ercisianus, was discovered in to live among the microbialite in Lake Van. Until then, Alburnus tarichi was thought to be the only fish to inhabit Lake Van.
