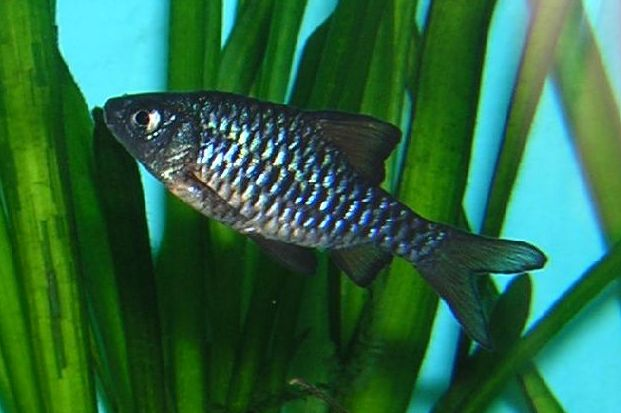
- Checker barb in an aquarium

Conservation status
- Least Concern (IUCN 3.1)

Scientific classification
- Kingdom: Animalia
- Phylum: Chordata
- Class: Actinopterygii
- Division: Teleostei
- Order: Cypriniformes
- Family: Cyprinidae
- Subfamily: Smiliogastrinae
- Genus: Oliotius; Kottelat, 2013
- Species: O. oligolepis

Binomial name
- Oliotius oligolepis (Bleeker, 1853)

Synonyms
- Capoeta oligolepis Bleeker, 1853; Puntius oligolepis (Bleeker, 1853)

= Checker barb =

Species of fish

The checker barb (Oliotius oligolepis) is a species of cyprinid fish endemic to creeks, rivers, and lakes in Sumatra, Indonesia. It has also been established in the wild in Colombia. The adult males have red fins with black tips. It will grow up to a length of 5 centimetres (2.0 in) TL. This species is the only known member of its genus.

== Etymology ==
The genus name Oliotius is derived as a combination of a portion of the specific epithet oligolepis and its former genus name Puntius.

The common name "checker barb" (as well as such related names as "checkered barb", "chequer barb" and "checkerboard barb") derives from the black marks on its side similar in appearance to those found on a checkerboard.

== Taxonomic issue ==
This species has sometimes been placed in the genus Barbus though Barbus oligolepis Battalgil, 1941 properly refers to another fish species that is only found in Turkey. Since Bleeker's oligolepis is not placed in Barbus, both names are valid.

== Habitat ==
Checker barbs natively live in a tropical climate and prefer water with a pH of 5.5 - 7.5, a water hardness of 10.0 dGH, and a temperature range of 64–77 °F (18–25 °C). Their omnivorous diet consists of small worms, crustaceans, insects, and plants.

An egg-scattering fish, they spawn early in the morning on plants that are the center of the male's territory. Once the spawning is completed, the pair will attempt to eat the eggs that they can find.

== In the aquarium ==
The checker barb has commercial importance in the aquarium trade industry. It has a mild temperament and thus is well suited to a community aquarium.

The checker barb is a schooling fish and should be kept in groups of no fewer than 6-10.

It occupies the medium to lower levels of the aquarium.

An ideal diet consists of both prepared and live or frozen foods.

== See also ==
- List of freshwater aquarium fish species
