= Pseudophoxinus drusensis =

Conservation status
- Endangered (IUCN 3.1)

Scientific classification
- Kingdom: Animalia
- Phylum: Chordata
- Class: Actinopterygii
- Order: Cypriniformes
- Family: Leuciscidae
- Subfamily: Leuciscinae
- Genus: Pseudophoxinus
- Species: P. drusensis

Binomial name
- Pseudophoxinus drusensis (Pellegrin, 1933)

Synonyms
- Phoxinellus drusensis Pellegrin, 1933

Species of fish

Pseudophoxinus drusensis, also known as the Drusian spring minnow, is a species of freshwater ray-finned fish belonging to the family Leuciscidae, which includes the daces, Eurasian minnows and related species.

Currently the species is known from 2-3 locations of Israel and has not been found during a survey in Syria. Its natural habitats are rivers, intermittent rivers, and freshwater marshes. It is threatened by habitat loss. In 2006 the species was assessed as endangered as it was estimated that the total population had declined by at least 50% between 1995 and 2006. It feeds on plants and small animals and spawns between April and June. It is believed to still be in decline, the area of occupancy is estimated to be less than 500 km², and the extent of occurrence estimated to be less than 5,000 km². It is therefore again assessed as Endangered.
