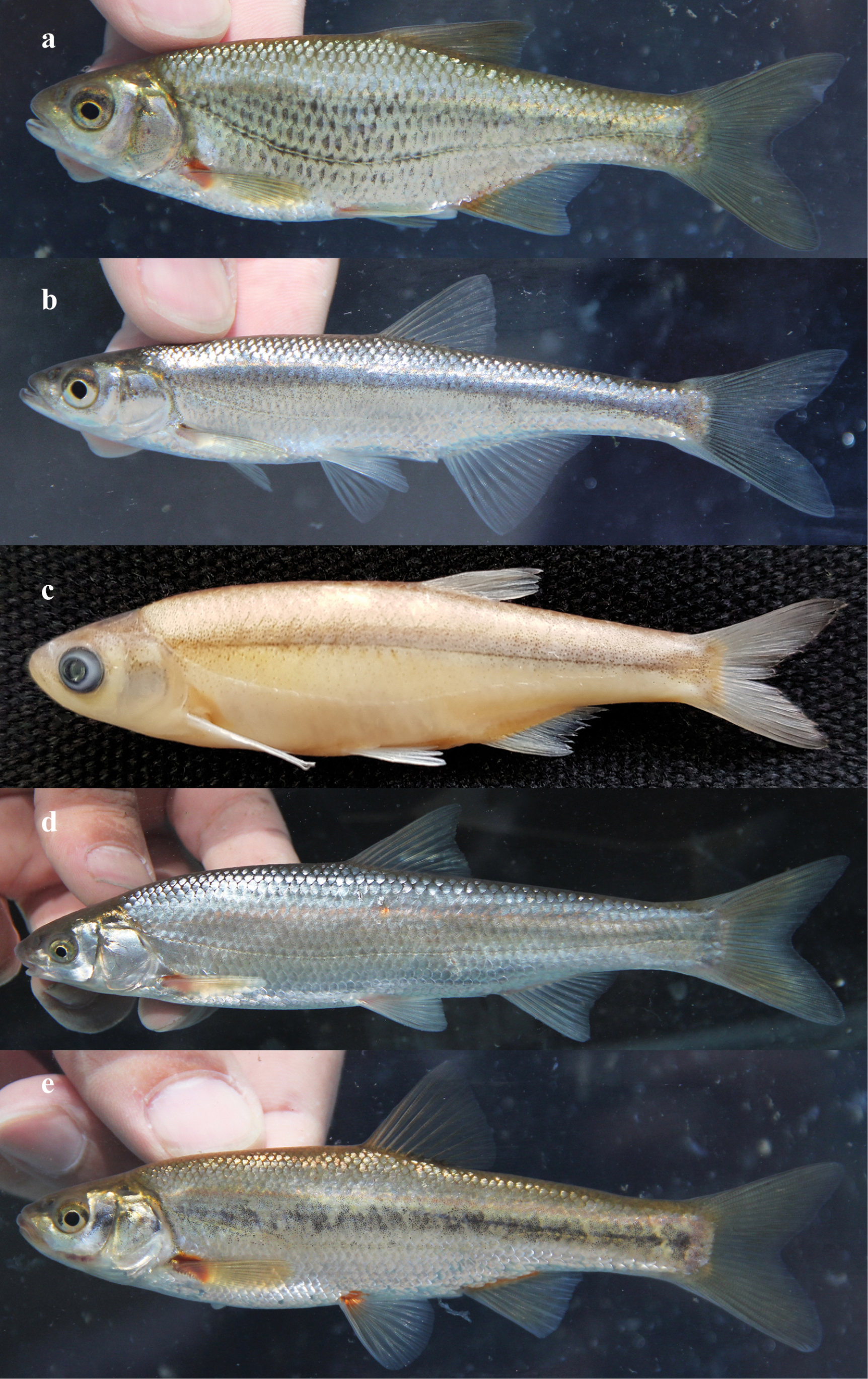
- A. filippii (exhibit b., second from top) from Kura River at Yalnızçam

Conservation status
- Least Concern (IUCN 3.1)

Scientific classification
- Kingdom: Animalia
- Phylum: Chordata
- Class: Actinopterygii
- Order: Cypriniformes
- Family: Leuciscidae
- Genus: Alburnus
- Species: A. filippii

Binomial name
- Alburnus filippii Kessler, 1877

= Kura bleak =

Species of fish

The Kura bleak (Alburnus filippii) is a species of ray-finned fish in the genus Alburnus. It is native to the Caspian Sea basin, from the Kura River and Aras River in the east to the Sefīd-Rūd in Iran.
