= Marmara barbel =

Conservation status
- Least Concern (IUCN 3.1)

Scientific classification
- Kingdom: Animalia
- Phylum: Chordata
- Class: Actinopterygii
- Order: Cypriniformes
- Family: Cyprinidae
- Subfamily: Barbinae
- Genus: Barbus
- Species: B. oligolepis

Binomial name
- Barbus oligolepis Battalgil, 1941

Species of fish

The Marmara barbel (Barbus oligolepis) is a species of cyprinid fish endemic to Turkey where it is only known from fast flowing waters with substrates of stones or pebbles. This species can reach a length of 35 centimetres (14 in) SL.

== Taxonomic issue ==
Oliotius oligolepis (Bleeker, 1853), a species of barb from Southeast Asia has at times been placed in the genus Barbus which would render the current species invalid as a junior homonym. However, since Bleeker's oligolepis species, originally in Capoeta, is currently placed in the genus Oliotius and before that in Puntius, Battalgil's oligolepis species is available and valid.
