= Pseudophoxinus caralis =

Scientific classification
- Kingdom: Animalia
- Phylum: Chordata
- Class: Actinopterygii
- Order: Cypriniformes
- Family: Leuciscidae
- Genus: Pseudophoxinus
- Species: P. caralis

Binomial name
- Pseudophoxinus caralis Battalgil, 1942

Species of fish

Pseudophoxinus caralis is a species of freshwater ray-finned fish belonging to the family Leuciscidae, which includes the daces, Eurasian minnows and related species. It is found in Lake Beyşehir basin in Central Anatolia, Turkey.

Its natural habitat is freshwater lakes.
