= Alburnus maximus =

Scientific classification
- Kingdom: Animalia
- Phylum: Chordata
- Class: Actinopterygii
- Order: Cypriniformes
- Family: Leuciscidae
- Genus: Alburnus
- Species: A. maximus

Binomial name
- Alburnus maximus Fatio, 1882

Species of fish

Alburnus maximus is a species of freshwater ray-finned fish belonging to the family Leuciscidae, the family which includes daces, minnows and related fishes. This species is endemic to Lake Lugano in Italy and Switzerland.
