= Hittitic spring minnow =

Conservation status
- Endangered (IUCN 3.1)

Scientific classification
- Kingdom: Animalia
- Phylum: Chordata
- Class: Actinopterygii
- Order: Cypriniformes
- Family: Leuciscidae
- Subfamily: Leuciscinae
- Genus: Pseudophoxinus
- Species: P. hittitorum

Binomial name
- Pseudophoxinus hittitorum Freyhof & Özuluğ, 2010

Species of fish

The Hittitic spring minnow (Pseudophoxinus hittitorum) is a species of freshwater ray-finned fish belonging to the family Leuciscidae, which includes the daces, Eurasian minnows and related species. It is found in drainages in central Anatolia in Turkey.
