= Pseudophoxinus mehmeti =

Scientific classification
- Kingdom: Animalia
- Phylum: Chordata
- Class: Actinopterygii
- Order: Cypriniformes
- Family: Leuciscidae
- Genus: Pseudophoxinus
- Species: P. mehmeti

Binomial name
- Pseudophoxinus mehmeti Ekmekçi, Atalay, Yoğurtçuoğlu, Turan & Küçük, 2015

Species of fish

Pseudophoxinus mehmeti is a species of freshwater ray-finned fish belonging to the family Leuciscidae, which includes the daces, Eurasian minnows and related species. It inhabits the Alanköy basin in Turkey's Burdur Province, has a maximum length of 7.1 centimetres (2.8 in) and is considered harmless to humans.

== Etymology ==
The fish is named in honor of hydrological engineer Mehmet Ekmekçi, the husband of the first author for his contributions to the studies in hydrological descriptions and characterizations and interpretations of the drainage networks and watersheds.
