= Georgian shemaya =

Conservation status
- Least Concern (IUCN 3.1)

Scientific classification
- Kingdom: Animalia
- Phylum: Chordata
- Class: Actinopterygii
- Order: Cypriniformes
- Family: Leuciscidae
- Subfamily: Leuciscinae
- Genus: Alburnus
- Species: A. derjugini

Binomial name
- Alburnus derjugini Berg, 1923

Synonyms
- Alburnus chalcoides var. derjugini Berg, 1923

Species of fish

The Georgian shemaya (Alburnus derjugini) is a species of ray-finned fish belonging to the family Leuciscidae. It is found in eastern Black Sea tributaries, from south of the Caucasus in Russia and Georgia, south to the Çoruh River in eastern Anatolia, Turkey and west to the Sakarya River.

The species name commemorates the collector Konstantin Deryugin.
