= Alburnus qalilus =

Conservation status
- Endangered (IUCN 3.1)

Scientific classification
- Kingdom: Animalia
- Phylum: Chordata
- Class: Actinopterygii
- Order: Cypriniformes
- Family: Leuciscidae
- Subfamily: Leuciscinae
- Genus: Alburnus
- Species: A. qalilus

Binomial name
- Alburnus qalilus Krupp, 1992

Species of fish

Alburnus qalilus, the Syrian spotted bleak, is a species of ray-finned fish in the family Leuciscidae, that is endemic to three rivers in Syria; the Nahr al-Kabir al-Janoubi, the Nahr al-Sanawbar and the Nahr al-Hawaiz. It is threatened by pollution, water abstraction and river damming.
