= Ceyhan spring minnow =

Conservation status
- Vulnerable (IUCN 3.1)

Scientific classification
- Kingdom: Animalia
- Phylum: Chordata
- Class: Actinopterygii
- Order: Cypriniformes
- Family: Leuciscidae
- Subfamily: Leuciscinae
- Genus: Pseudophoxinus
- Species: P. zekayi

Binomial name
- Pseudophoxinus zekayi Bogutskaya, Küçük & Atalay, 2006

Species of fish

The Ceyhan spring minnow (Pseudophoxinus zekayi) is a species of freshwater ray-finned fish belonging to the family Leuciscidae, which includes the daces, Eurasian minnows and related species. It is found in the Ceyhan River drainage in Turkey.

== Etymology ==
The fish is named in honor of Zekay Atalay.
