= Adana bleak =

Conservation status
- Extinct (IUCN 3.1)

Scientific classification
- Kingdom: Animalia
- Phylum: Chordata
- Class: Actinopterygii
- Division: Teleostei
- Order: Cypriniformes
- Family: Leuciscidae
- Genus: Alburnus
- Species: †A. adanensis

Binomial name
- †Alburnus adanensis Battalgil, 1944

Synonyms
- Alburnus sellal adanensis Battalgil, 1944

Extinct species of ray-finned fish

The Adana bleak (Alburnus adanensis) is an extinct species of freshwater fish in the family Leuciscidae that was endemic to the Ceyhan and Seyhan river basins in Turkey. It was last recorded in 1944 and declared extinct by the IUCN in 2023.
