= Marqīyah spring minnow =

Conservation status
- Critically Endangered (IUCN 3.1)

Scientific classification
- Kingdom: Animalia
- Phylum: Chordata
- Class: Actinopterygii
- Order: Cypriniformes
- Family: Leuciscidae
- Subfamily: Leuciscinae
- Genus: Pseudophoxinus
- Species: P. hasani

Binomial name
- Pseudophoxinus hasani Krupp, 1992

Species of fish

The Marqīyah spring minnow (Pseudophoxinus hasani) is a species of freshwater ray-finned fish belonging to the family Leuciscidae, which includes the daces, Eurasian minnows and related species. It is found in the Nahr Marqīyah stream in Syria. It can grow to 5.8 cm (2.3 in) standard length.
