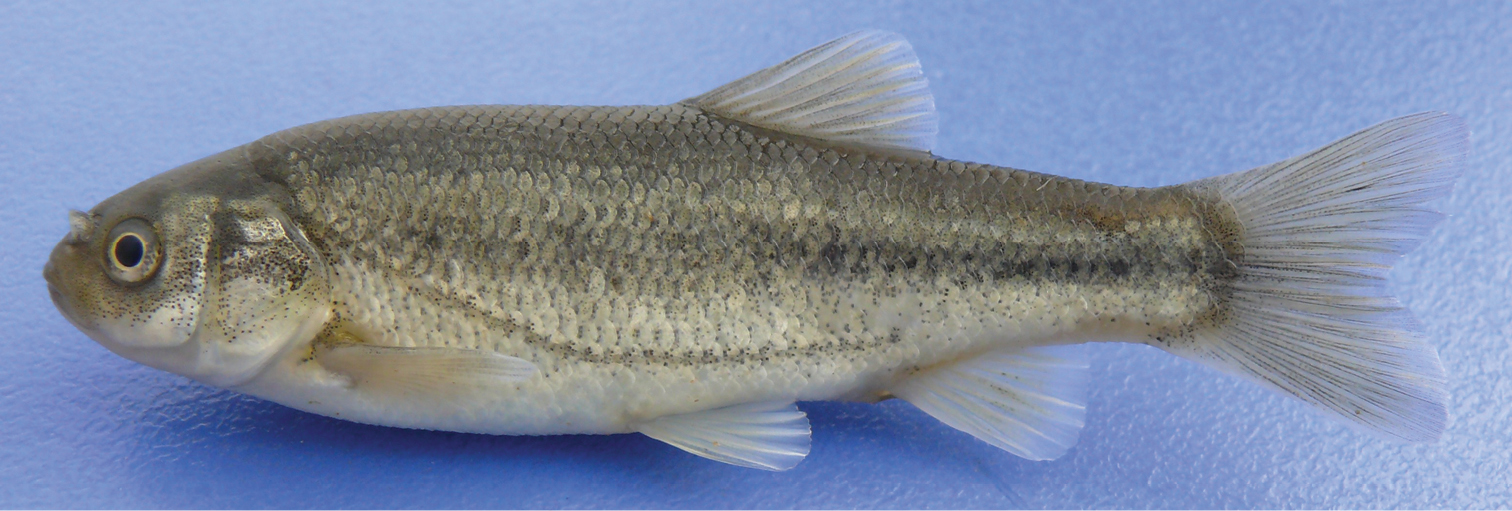
- female

Conservation status
- Endangered (IUCN 3.1)

Scientific classification
- Kingdom: Animalia
- Phylum: Chordata
- Class: Actinopterygii
- Order: Cypriniformes
- Family: Leuciscidae
- Subfamily: Leuciscinae
- Genus: Pseudophoxinus
- Species: P. burduricus

Binomial name
- Pseudophoxinus burduricus Küçük, Gülle, Güçlü, Çiftçi & Erdoğan, 2013

= Burdur spring minnow =

Species of fish

The Burdur spring minnow (Pseudophoxinus burduricus) is a species of freshwater ray-finned fish belonging to the family Leuciscidae, which includes the daces, Eurasian minnows and related species. It is found in several springs and streams in the Central Anatolia Region in and in the surroundings of Lake Burdur and Lake Salda basins in Turkey.
