= Pseudophoxinus battalgilae =

Conservation status
- Least Concern (IUCN 3.1)

Scientific classification
- Kingdom: Animalia
- Phylum: Chordata
- Class: Actinopterygii
- Order: Cypriniformes
- Family: Leuciscidae
- Genus: Pseudophoxinus
- Species: P. battalgilae

Binomial name
- Pseudophoxinus battalgilae Bogutskaya, 1997

Synonyms
- Pseudophoxinus battalgili Bogutskaya, 1997

Species of fish

Pseudophoxinus battalgilae, also known as the Beysehir minnow or Tuz Lake spring minnow, is a species of freshwater ray-finned fish belonging to the family Leuciscidae, which includes the daces, Eurasian minnows and related species. It is found in Lake Beyşehir and Lake Tuz in Central Anatolia, Turkey.

Its natural habitat is freshwater lakes.

== Etymology ==
The fish is named in honor of Turkish ichthyologist Fahire Battalgil (1902–1948), who in the authors words "contributed considerably to the knowledge of Turkish freshwater fishes".
