= Alburnus neretvae =

Conservation status
- Least Concern (IUCN 3.1)

Scientific classification
- Kingdom: Animalia
- Phylum: Chordata
- Class: Actinopterygii
- Order: Cypriniformes
- Family: Leuciscidae
- Subfamily: Leuciscinae
- Genus: Alburnus
- Species: A. neretvae

Binomial name
- Alburnus neretvae Buj, Šanda & Perea, 2010

Species of fish

Alburnus neretvae is a species of ray-finned fish in the genus Alburnus. It is endemic to the Neretva River drainage in Croatia and Bosnia and Herzegovina.
