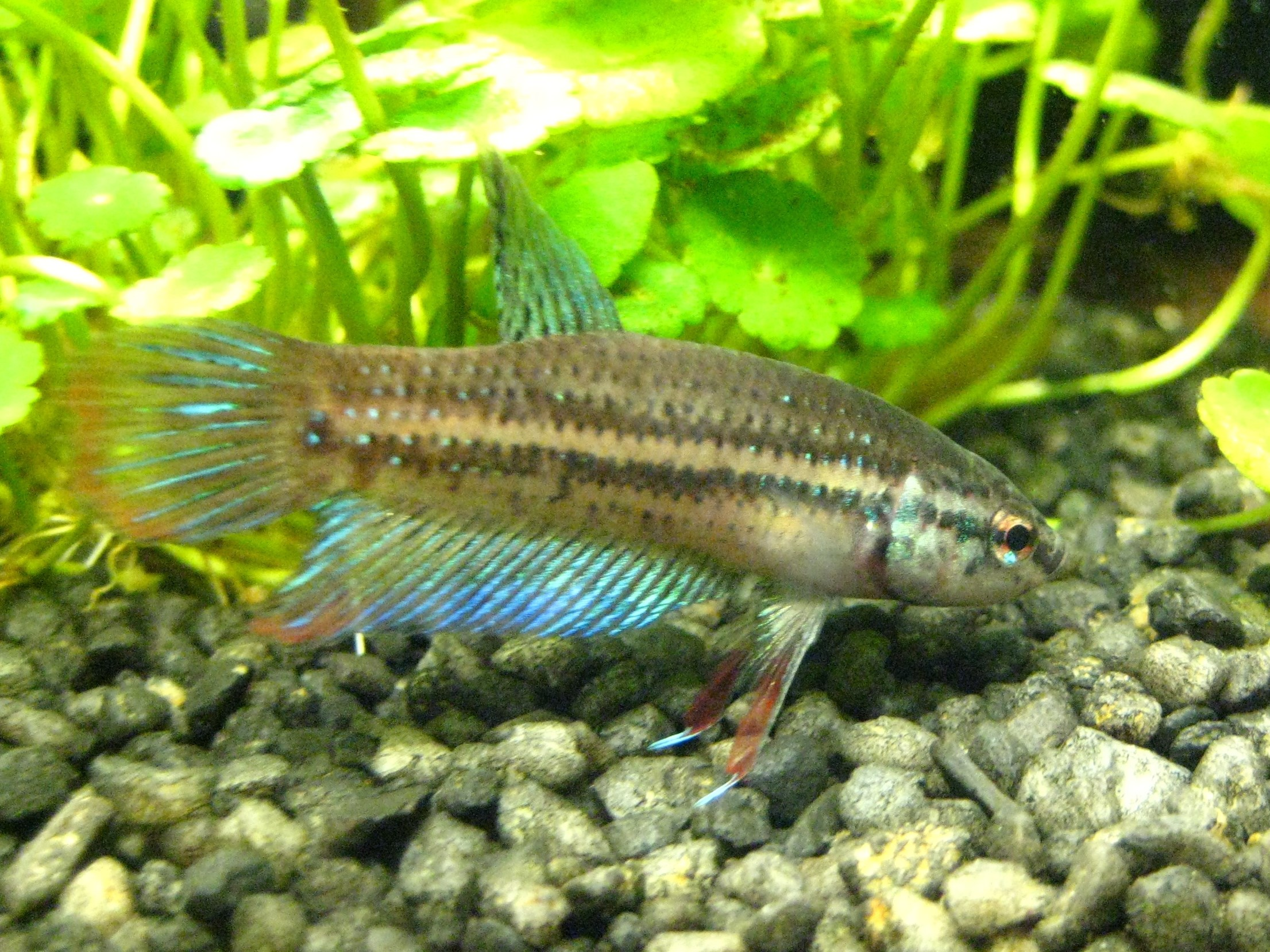

Conservation status
- Least Concern (IUCN 3.1)

Scientific classification
- Kingdom: Animalia
- Phylum: Chordata
- Class: Actinopterygii
- Order: Anabantiformes
- Family: Osphronemidae
- Genus: Betta
- Species: B. imbellis

Binomial name
- Betta imbellis Ladiges, 1975

= Peaceful betta =

Species of fish

The peaceful betta or crescent betta (Betta imbellis) is a species of gourami native to Southeast Asia.

Betta imbellis has a pair of suprabranchial chambers that each house a labyrinth organ, a complex bony structure lined with thin, highly vascularised respiratory epithelium. The labyrinth organ is a morpho‐physiological adaptation that allows the B. imbellis to extract oxygen from air. This adaptation allows the species to persist in extreme conditions.

Males of the species may fight each other especially when in breeding condition. It can jump.

== Description ==
Betta imbellis grows to a maximum standard length of 6 cm (2.4 in). It can live for up to 5 years.

== Distribution ==
Betta imbellis occurs naturally in Southern Thailand, Malaysia, and Indonesia, although it has been introduced to Singapore.

== Habitat ==
Betta imbellis lives in sluggish bodies of water, including rice paddies, swamps, streams and ponds, with a substrate composed of leaf litter and mud.

== Conservation status ==
Betta imbellis is listed as least concern by the IUCN Red List. It is still threatened by pollution and hybridization with released domesticated bettas (Siamese fighting fish) and other bettas in the B. splendens complex.

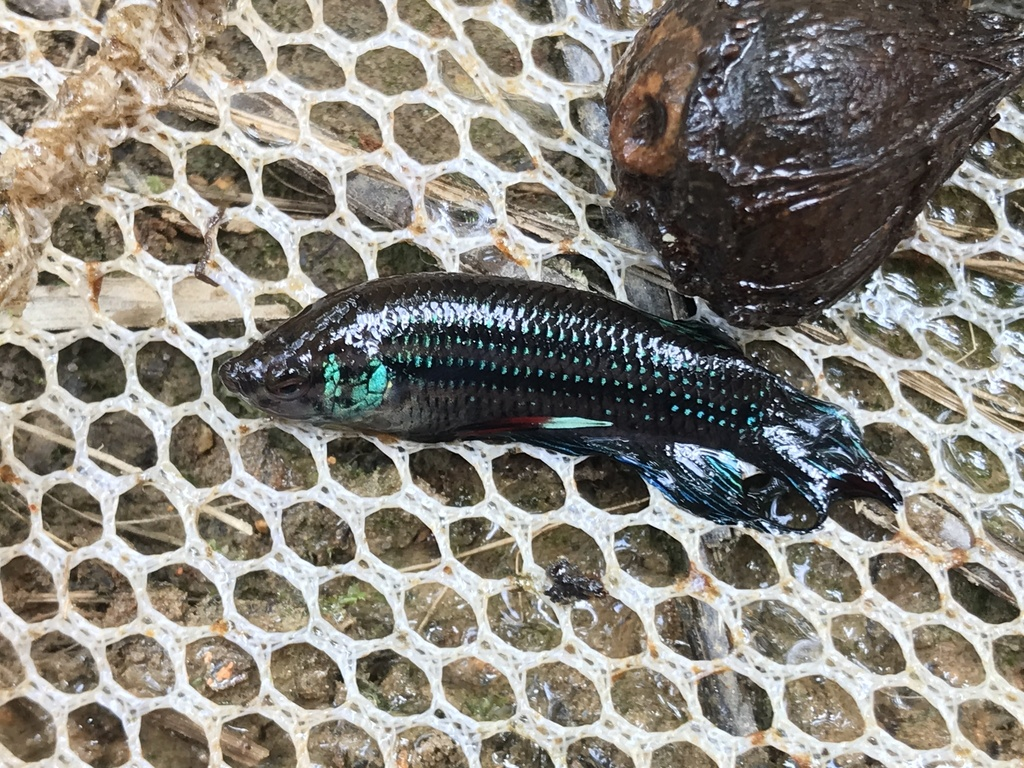
Wild male Betta imbellis from Selangor, Malaysia

== Diet ==
In the wild, Betta imbellis feeds on terrestrial and aquatic invertebrates. In captivity, the species is fed live or frozen food like Daphnia, Artemia or bloodworms.

== Breeding ==
The more colorful bodies of the males distinguish them from the females, with the males having blue hues in their brownish bodies. Male and female individuals of Betta imbellis can live together outside of breeding season, as well as getting together for breeding. Males will build a bubble nest before breeding. After mating, the male catches the falling eggs and places them in his bubble nest. In 1–2 days, the eggs hatch and continue to absorb their yolk sack for 2 days. After that, the fry became free to swim. Until then, the male cares for them.

== Human use ==
Betta imbellis is found in the aquarium trade. In the aquarium trade it must have a tank of up to 40 litres (10 gallons).
