= Amirkabir's bleak =

Scientific classification
- Kingdom: Animalia
- Phylum: Chordata
- Class: Actinopterygii
- Order: Cypriniformes
- Family: Leuciscidae
- Subfamily: Leuciscinae
- Genus: Alburnus
- Species: A. amirkabiri

Binomial name
- Alburnus amirkabiri Mousavi-Sabet, Vatandoust, Khataminejad, Eagderi, Abbasi, Nasri, Jouladeh, & Vasil'eva, 2015

Species of fish

Amirkabir's bleak (Alburnus amirkabiri) is a species of freshwater fish in the family Cyprinidae, endemic to Iran. Recent research has indicated that A. amirkabiri is probably a synonym of Alburnus doriae.

== Distribution ==
Alburnus amirkabiri is endemic to Iran where it occurs in the Namak Lake basin in Markazi Province.

== Description ==
The maximum known size for Alburnus amirkabiri is 117mm for females.
