= Bakır shemaya =

Conservation status
- Endangered (IUCN 3.1)

Scientific classification
- Kingdom: Animalia
- Phylum: Chordata
- Class: Actinopterygii
- Order: Cypriniformes
- Family: Leuciscidae
- Subfamily: Leuciscinae
- Genus: Alburnus
- Species: A. attalus

Binomial name
- Alburnus attalus Özuluğ & Freyhof, 2007

Species of fish

The Bakır shemaya (Alburnus attalus) is a species of ray-finned fish in the genus Alburnus. It is endemic to the Bakırçay River in Western Anatolia, Turkey. It is threatened by river pollution and damming.
