= Alburnus ulanus =

Scientific classification
- Kingdom: Animalia
- Phylum: Chordata
- Class: Actinopterygii
- Order: Cypriniformes
- Family: Leuciscidae
- Genus: Alburnus
- Species: A. ulanus

Binomial name
- Alburnus ulanus (Günther, 1899)

Synonyms
- Leuciscus ulanus Günther, 1899; Squalius ulanus (Günther, 1899); Petroleuciscus ulanus (Günther 1899); Leuciscus gaderanus Günther, 1899

Species of fish

Alburnus ulanus is a species of freshwater ray-finned fish belonging to the family Leuciscidae. This fish is endemic to Iran, where it is found only in the drainage basin of Lake Urmia. This species has a maximum published total length of 4.5 cm (1.8 in).
