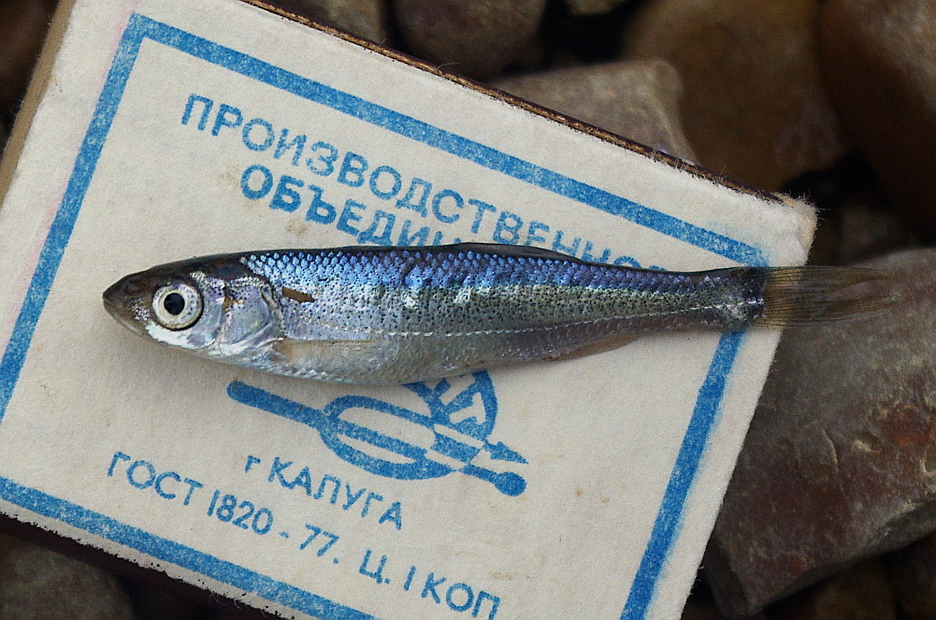

Conservation status
- Least Concern (IUCN 3.1)

Scientific classification
- Kingdom: Animalia
- Phylum: Chordata
- Class: Actinopterygii
- Order: Cypriniformes
- Family: Leuciscidae
- Subfamily: Leuciscinae
- Genus: Alburnus
- Species: A. hohenackeri

Binomial name
- Alburnus hohenackeri Kessler, 1877

Synonyms
- Alburbus charusini Herzenstein, 1889; Alburnus hohenackeri var. latifrons Kamensky, 1901; Alburnus lucidus var. macropterus Kamesnsky,1 1901

= North Caucasian bleak =

Species of fish

The North Caucasian bleak (Alburnus hohenackeri), or Transcaucasian bleak, is a species of freshwater fish in the family Leuciscidae, which includes the daces. minnows and related fishes. It is found in the western and southwestern Caspian basin in the countries of Armenia, Azerbaijan, Georgia, Iran and the Russian Federation.

== Taxonomy ==
The North Caucasian bleak was first formally described in 1877 by the Baltic German zoologist Karl Fedorovich Kessler with its type locality given as Karabakh in Azerbaijan. This taxon has been regarded as both a synonym and subspecies of the common bleak (A. alburnus) but is now regarded as a valid species. The genus Alburnus, the bleaks, is classified within the subfamily Leuciscinae of the family Leuciscidae.

== Etymology ==
The North Caucasian bleak belongs to the genus Alburnus a name derived from the Latin for whitefish but it also refers to the bleak, a name which means pale in English, in reference to the pale non lustrous colour of A. alburnus. The specific name, hohenackeri, honours Rudolph Hohenhacker, the Swiss missionary and botanist, who collected some of the types of this species.

== Description ==
The North Caucasian bleak is distinguished from the related fishes in the basin of the Caspian and Black Seas by having the origin of the anal fin below the 4th and 5th branched dorsal fin rays. It also has a lateral line with between 38 and 43 scales along its length and an anal fin with 11 to 16 1/2 branched rays. The ventral keel may be naked or partially or wholly covered in scales. It has a laterally compressed, deep body which has a depth equivalent to between one quarter and one third of its standard length, markedly laterally compressed and the caudal peduncle has a depth equivalent to 1.7 to 2.1 times in its length. This species has a maximum standard length of 15 cm (5.9 in).

== Distribution and habitat ==
The North Caucasian bleak is found in the Caucasus region of extreme southeastern Europe and Western Asia in river systems draining into the Caspian Sea from the Kuma River in Russia south to the Sefid-Rud in northwestern Iran. It prefers slow moving waterbodies and can be found in the middle and lower reaches of large rivers and their tributaries, reservoirs and swampy creeks, as well as in brackish water at river mouths, in estuaries and coastal lakes.
