= Eastern Aegean bleak =

Conservation status
- Vulnerable (IUCN 3.1)

Scientific classification
- Domain: Eukaryota
- Kingdom: Animalia
- Phylum: Chordata
- Class: Actinopterygii
- Order: Cypriniformes
- Family: Leuciscidae
- Subfamily: Leuciscinae
- Genus: Alburnus
- Species: A. demiri

Binomial name
- Alburnus demiri Özuluğ & Freyhof, 2008

Species of fish

The Eastern Aegean bleak (Alburnus demiri) is a species of ray-finned fish in the genus Alburnus. It is known from the river drainages of the Gümüldür River, the Büyük Menderes River and the Dalaman River in Turkey. It may have been found in the Küçükmenderes River before the river dried up. It is threatened by pollution, water abstraction and river damming.
