= Lycian spring minnow =

Conservation status
- Endangered (IUCN 3.1)

Scientific classification
- Kingdom: Animalia
- Phylum: Chordata
- Class: Actinopterygii
- Order: Cypriniformes
- Family: Leuciscidae
- Subfamily: Leuciscinae
- Genus: Pseudophoxinus
- Species: P. evliyai

Binomial name
- Pseudophoxinus evliyai Freyhof & Özuluğ, 2010

Species of fish

The Lycian spring minnow (Pseudophoxinus evliyai) is a species of freshwater ray-finned fish belonging to the family Leuciscidae, which includes the daces, Eurasian minnows and related species. It is found in drainages in western Anatolia in Turkey.

== Etymology ==
The fish is named in honor of Evliya Çelebi (1611–1683), whose travel notes were published in the 10-volume Seyahatname (Book of Travels), which earned him the title of "the most famous Ottoman traveler". Originally P. evliyae, the name was changed to P. evliyai based on gender rules.
