= Pseudophoxinus antalyae =

Conservation status
- Vulnerable (IUCN 3.1)

Scientific classification
- Kingdom: Animalia
- Phylum: Chordata
- Class: Actinopterygii
- Order: Cypriniformes
- Family: Leuciscidae
- Subfamily: Leuciscinae
- Genus: Pseudophoxinus
- Species: P. antalyae

Binomial name
- Pseudophoxinus antalyae Bogutskaya, 1992

Species of fish

Pseudophoxinus antalyae, also known as the Antalya minnow or Antalya spring minnow, is a species of freshwater ray-finned fish belonging to the family Leuciscidae, which includes the daces, Eurasian minnows and related species.It is found only in Turkey. Its natural habitats are rivers and intermittent rivers. It is threatened by habitat loss.
