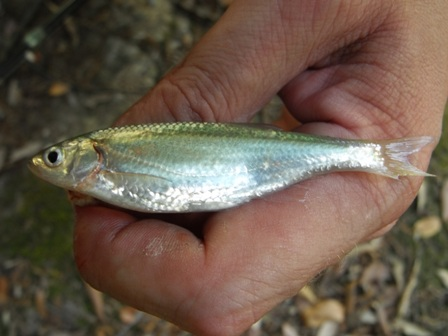

Conservation status
- Near Threatened (IUCN 3.1)

Scientific classification
- Kingdom: Animalia
- Phylum: Chordata
- Class: Actinopterygii
- Order: Cypriniformes
- Family: Leuciscidae
- Subfamily: Leuciscinae
- Genus: Alburnus
- Species: A. arborella

Binomial name
- Alburnus arborella (Bonaparte, 1841)

Synonyms
- Aspius arborella Bonaparte, 1841; Cyprinus albor Scopoli, 1786; Cyprinus lanceolatus Bloch & Schneider, 1801; Aspius alborella De Filippi, 1844; Alburnus alborella (De Filippi, 1844)

= Alburnus arborella =

Species of fish

Alburnus arborella, the alborella or Italian bleak, is a species of freshwater fish in the family Leuciscidae, which includes the daces. minnows and related fishes This fish is found in northern Italy, Switzerland, San Marino, Slovenia and Croatia.

== Taxonomy ==
Alburnus arborella was first formally described as Aspius arborella in 1841 by the French biologist and art collector Charles Lucien Bonaparte with its type locality given as the lakes of northern Italy. This taxon has been regarded as a subspecies of the common bleak (A. alburnus) but is now regarded as a valid species. The genus Alburnus is classified within the subfamily Leuciscinae of the family Leuciscidae.

== Etymology ==
Alburnus arborella belongs to the genus Alburnus a name derived from the Latin for whitefish but it also refers to the bleak, a name which means pale in English, in reference to the pale non lustrous colour of A. alburnus. The specific name, arborella, is thought to be a misspelling of alborella, the Italian common name for this fish.

== Description ==
Alburnus arborella is distinguished from related species around the Adriatic Sea by having the origin of the anal fin immediately to the underneath the 4th to 8th branched dorsal fin rays. The anal fin has between 13 and 16 1/2. The ventral keel is exposed and is partially or completely scaled. In life there is a faint stripe along the lateral line and this becomes more distinct in preserved specimens. The pectoral fin does not extend as far as the base of the pelvic fin. The mouth is upward pointing. This species has a maximum standard length is 12.7 cm (5.0 in).

== Distribution and habitat ==
Alburnus arborella is endemic to rivers which drain into the northern part of the Adriatic Sea from the Chienti drainage basin in Marche to Istria, there is an isolated population in the Zrmanja bain in Croatia. This fish has been introduced other parts of Italy, including northern Sardinia, and Croatia. The alborella can be found in a wide range of aquatic habitats from large subalpine lakes to lowland rivers and small streams. It is also found in anthropogenic habitats such as reservoirs and canalised rivers.
