= Sellal bleak =

Conservation status
- Least Concern (IUCN 3.1)

Scientific classification
- Kingdom: Animalia
- Phylum: Chordata
- Class: Actinopterygii
- Order: Cypriniformes
- Family: Leuciscidae
- Subfamily: Leuciscinae
- Genus: Alburnus
- Species: A. sellal

Binomial name
- Alburnus sellal Heckel, 1843

Synonyms
- Alburnus hebes Heckel, 1843; Alburnus microlepis Heckel, 1843; Alburnus pallidus Heckel, 1843; Alburnus mossulensis Heckel, 1843; Chalcalburnus sellal (Heckel, 1843)

Species of fish

The Sellal bleak (Alburnus sellal) is a species of ray-finned fish in the genus Alburnus. It can be found in the drainage basins of the Queiq River and the Tigris–Euphrates river system in Iran, Iraq, Syria and Turkey. A recent study has found that Alburnus mossulensis was probably a synonym of Alburnus sellal.
