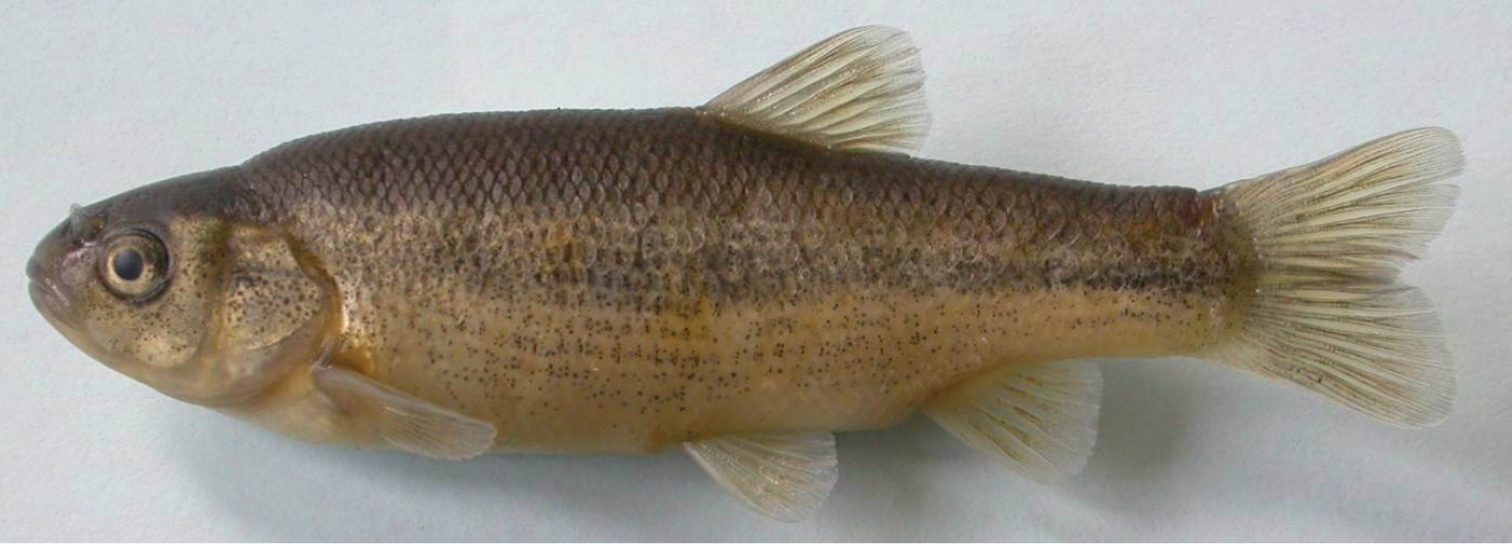

Conservation status
- Critically Endangered (IUCN 3.1)

Scientific classification
- Kingdom: Animalia
- Phylum: Chordata
- Class: Actinopterygii
- Order: Cypriniformes
- Family: Leuciscidae
- Subfamily: Leuciscinae
- Genus: Pseudophoxinus
- Species: P. ninae

Binomial name
- Pseudophoxinus ninae Freyhof & Özuluğ, 2006

= Onaç spring minnow =

Species of fish

The Onaç spring minnow (Pseudophoxinus ninae) is a species of freshwater ray-finned fish belonging to the family Leuciscidae, which includes the daces, Eurasian minnows and related species. It is found in the Onaç drainage in Anatolia in Turkey.

== Etymology ==
The fish is named in honor of in honor of Russian ichthyologist Nina G. Bogutskaya (b. 1958), the author of many papers on the Anatolian Pseudophoxinus and other leuciscids from the area.
