= Turan's minnow =

Scientific classification
- Kingdom: Animalia
- Phylum: Chordata
- Class: Actinopterygii
- Order: Cypriniformes
- Family: Leuciscidae
- Genus: Pseudophoxinus
- Species: P. turani

Binomial name
- Pseudophoxinus turani Küçük & Güçlü, 2014

Species of fish

Turan's minnow (Pseudophoxinus turani) is a species of freshwater ray-finned fish belonging to the family Leuciscidae, which includes the daces, Eurasian minnows and related species. It is endemic to Incesu Spring in the Orontes River drainage in Turkey.

== Etymology ==
The fish is named in honor of Turkish ichthyologist Davut Turan, because of his contributions to the knowledge of the fishes of Anatolia.
