= Thick lipped chub =

Conservation status
- Vulnerable (IUCN 3.1)

Scientific classification
- Kingdom: Animalia
- Phylum: Chordata
- Class: Actinopterygii
- Order: Cypriniformes
- Family: Leuciscidae
- Subfamily: Leuciscinae
- Genus: Squalius
- Species: S. cephaloides

Binomial name
- Squalius cephaloides (Battalgil, 1942)

Synonyms
- Leuciscus cephaloides Battalgil, 1942

Species of fish

The thick lipped chub (Squalius cephaloides) is a species of cyprinid fish known only from the Armutlu Peninsula in Turkey.
