= Gediz shemaya =

Conservation status
- Vulnerable (IUCN 3.1)

Scientific classification
- Domain: Eukaryota
- Kingdom: Animalia
- Phylum: Chordata
- Class: Actinopterygii
- Order: Cypriniformes
- Family: Leuciscidae
- Subfamily: Leuciscinae
- Genus: Alburnus
- Species: A. battalgilae

Binomial name
- Alburnus battalgilae Özuluğ & Freyhof, 2007

Species of fish

The Gediz shemaya (Alburnus battalgilae) is a species of ray-finned fish in the genus Alburnus. It is endemic to the Gediz River and Koca River drainages in Turkey. It is threatened by water extraction and agricultural pollution.
