= Pseudophoxinus elizavetae =

Conservation status
- Critically Endangered (IUCN 3.1)

Scientific classification
- Kingdom: Animalia
- Phylum: Chordata
- Class: Actinopterygii
- Order: Cypriniformes
- Family: Leuciscidae
- Subfamily: Leuciscinae
- Genus: Pseudophoxinus
- Species: P. elizavetae

Binomial name
- Pseudophoxinus elizavetae Bogutskaya, Küçük & Atalay, 2006

Species of fish

Pseudophoxinus elizavetae, also known as the Sultan Sazlığı minnow, is a species of freshwater ray-finned fish belonging to the family Leuciscidae, which includes the daces, Eurasian minnows and related species. It is found in several springs and streams in Kayseri Province in Turkey.

== Etymology ==
The fish is named in honor of physician Elizaveta Bogutskaya (b. 1981), who happens to be the senior author's daughter.
