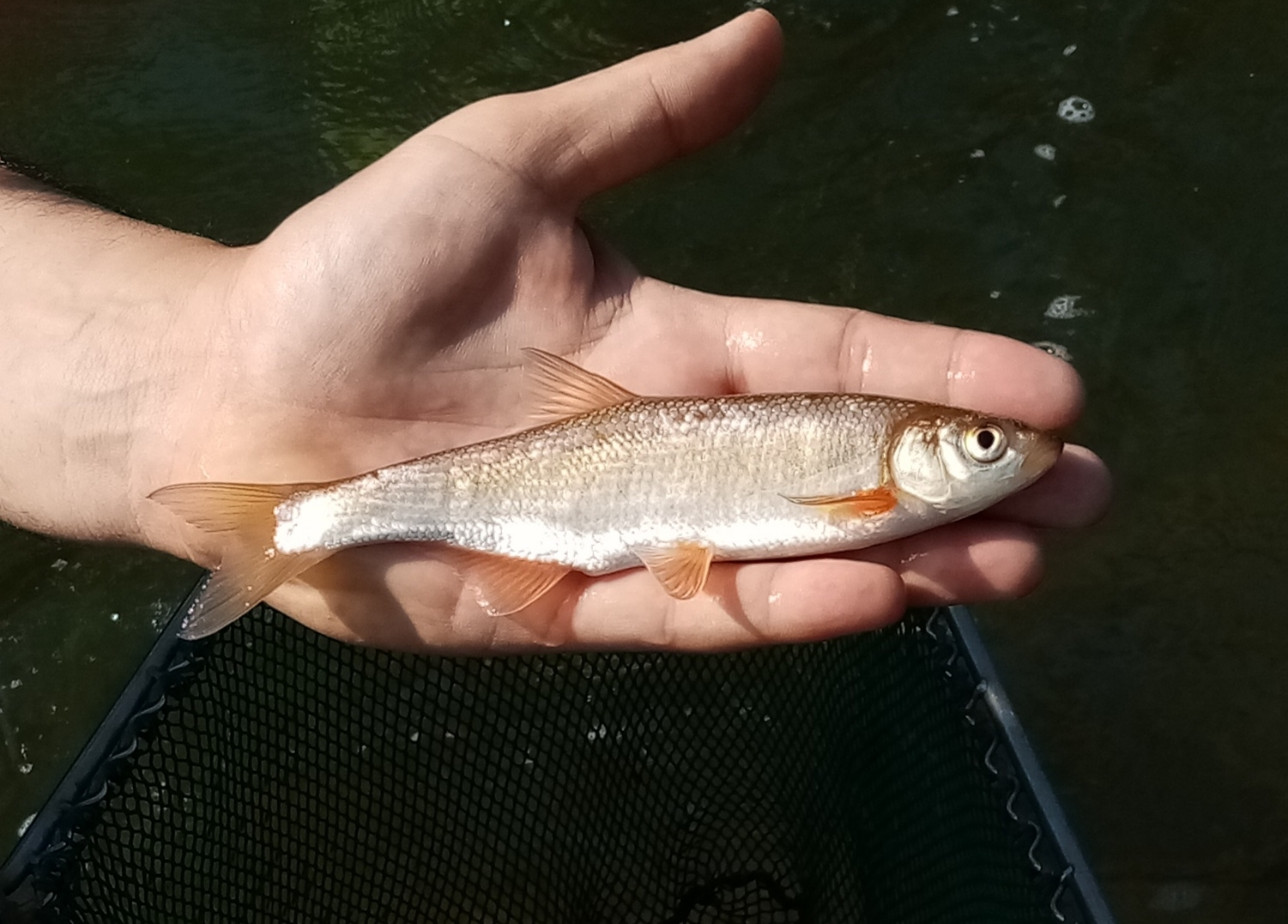
- A. vistonicus in Eastern Macedonia and Thrace, Greece

Conservation status
- Endangered (IUCN 3.1)

Scientific classification
- Kingdom: Animalia
- Phylum: Chordata
- Class: Actinopterygii
- Order: Cypriniformes
- Family: Leuciscidae
- Subfamily: Leuciscinae
- Genus: Alburnus
- Species: A. vistonicus

Binomial name
- Alburnus vistonicus Freyhof & Kottelat, 2007

= Alburnus vistonicus =

Species of fish

Alburnus vistonicus, the Vistonis shemaja, is a species of ray-finned fish in the genus Alburnus that is endemic to the Lake Vistonida drainage in Greece. This species reaches a maximum length of 21.7 centimetres (8.5 in) (SL).
