= Pisidian spring minnow =

Conservation status
- Endangered (IUCN 3.1)

Scientific classification
- Kingdom: Animalia
- Phylum: Chordata
- Class: Actinopterygii
- Order: Cypriniformes
- Family: Leuciscidae
- Subfamily: Leuciscinae
- Genus: Pseudophoxinus
- Species: P. fahrettini

Binomial name
- Pseudophoxinus fahrettini Freyhof & Özuluğ, 2010

Species of fish

The Pisidian spring minnow (Pseudophoxinus fahrettini) is a species of freshwater ray-finned fish belonging to the family Leuciscidae, which includes the daces, Eurasian minnows and related species. It is found in Köprü River drainage in central Anatolia in Turkey.

== Etymology ==
The fish is named in honor of Turkish zoologist Fahrettin Küçük, of the Süleyman Demirel University, because of his contribution to the knowledge of Central Anatolian fishes.
