= Alburnus escherichii =

Conservation status
- Least Concern (IUCN 3.1)

Scientific classification
- Kingdom: Animalia
- Phylum: Chordata
- Class: Actinopterygii
- Order: Cypriniformes
- Family: Leuciscidae
- Genus: Alburnus
- Species: A. escherichii

Binomial name
- Alburnus escherichii Steindachner, 1897

Species of fish

Alburnus escherichii, also known as the Sakarya bleak or Caucasian bleak, is a species of ray-finned fish in the genus Alburnus. It is native to the Sakarya River drainage in Turkey, and has been introduced into Lake Beyşehir and the Manavgat River.
