= Alburnus tarichi =

Conservation status
- Near Threatened (IUCN 3.1)

Scientific classification
- Kingdom: Animalia
- Phylum: Chordata
- Class: Actinopterygii
- Order: Cypriniformes
- Family: Leuciscidae
- Genus: Alburnus
- Species: A. tarichi

Binomial name
- Alburnus tarichi (Güldenstädt, 1814)

Synonyms
- Cyprinus tarichi Güldenstädt, 1814; Chalcalburnus tarichi (Güldenstädt, 1814); Leuciscus vanensis Günther, 1868

Species of fish

Alburnus tarichi, known as the tarek, pearl mullet, Van fish or Van shah kuli, is a species of ray-finned fish belonging to the family Leuciscidae. This species is restricted to Turkey, where it is endemic to the Lake Van basin. The local names are the following: Turkish: İnci kefalı / İnci balığı, Kurdish: darex darach, and Armenian: տառեխ taṙex.

It was thought to be the only fish to inhabit Lake Van, when in 2018, a new species of fish, Oxynoemacheilus ercisianus, was discovered to live among the microbialite.

The tarek is the 'jewel' of Lake Van in Turkey. Found nowhere else in the world, this fish thrives in the lake's salty and alkaline waters, which are inhospitable to other forms of fresh water and marine fish. In May and June of each year it travels upstream through the lake's tributaries to lay eggs, flying through the air like salmon.

Many locals have become accustomed to sticking out bags and catching fish as they jump out of the water, catching so many fish in May–June that they do not have to fish for the rest of the year. Locals prefer to catch the fish during reproduction season, when the females are filled with eggs, which are considered a delicacy in the town and region of Erciş. YYÜ and Doğa Gözcüleri Derneği have been developing a conservation strategy since 1997 (Sari, 2012). Despite a government ban on fishing during reproduction season, this kind of fishing has become a big business. In the 1960s, 600 tons of the fish were harvested annually; today that figure is 15,000 tons. The species was considered Endangered on the IUCN Red List in 1994, but was downgraded to Near Threatened in 2014.

For centuries, tarrekh fishing in Lake Van was a major occupation for Armenians. It enabled them prepare and enjoy freshly caught fish on the spot, and also to preserve it for the winter (the fish was salted, air-cured, and dried).

== Gallery ==
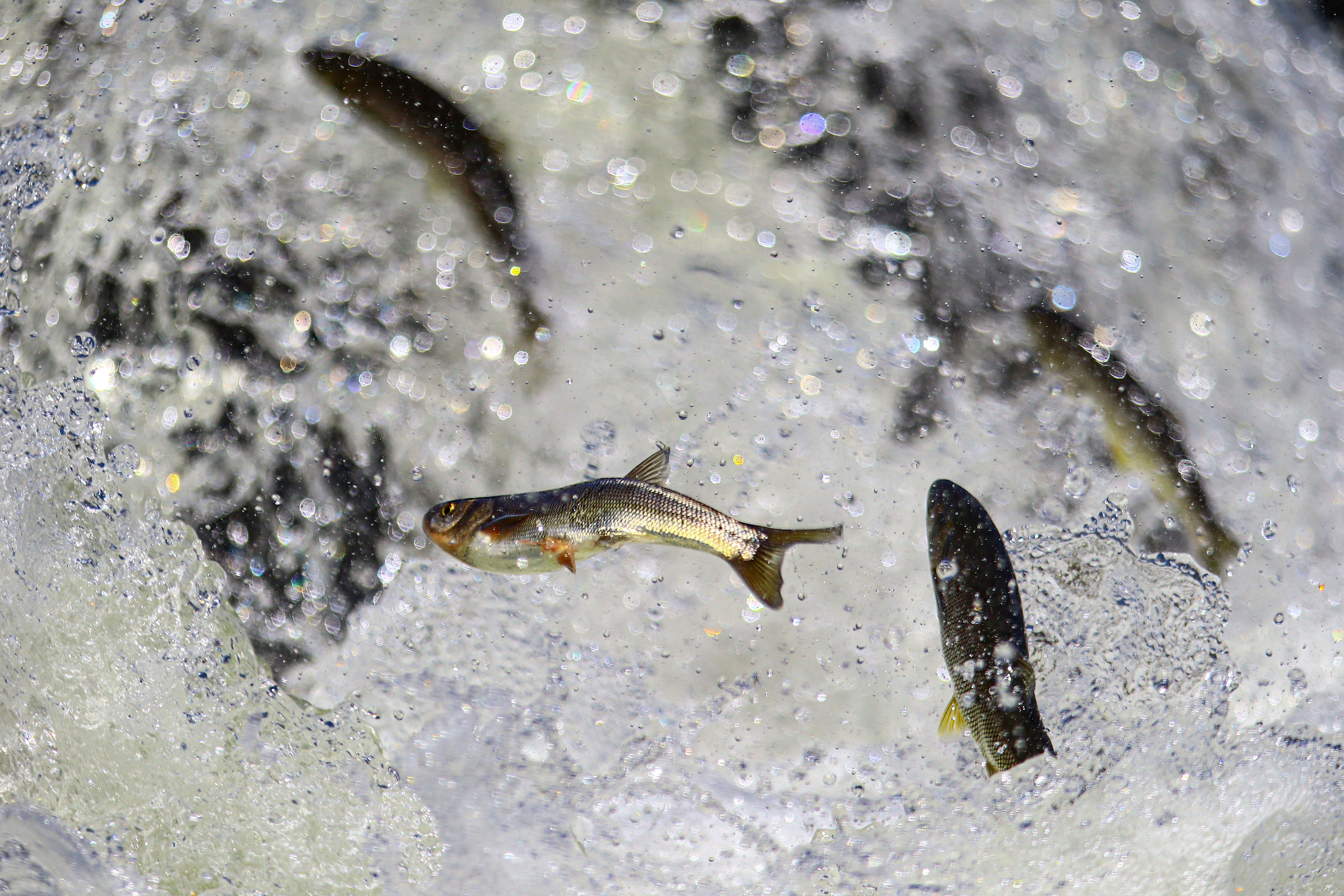
Van fish
