= Eyilikler gudgeon =

Conservation status
- Data Deficient (IUCN 3.1)

Scientific classification
- Kingdom: Animalia
- Phylum: Chordata
- Class: Actinopterygii
- Order: Cypriniformes
- Suborder: Cyprinoidei
- Family: Gobionidae
- Genus: Gobio
- Species: G. battalgilae

Binomial name
- Gobio battalgilae Naseka, Erk'akan & Küçük, 2006

Species of fish

The Eyilikler gudgeon (Gobio battalgilae) is a species of gudgeon, a small freshwater in the family Cyprinidae. It is found in Turkey.

Named in honor of Süleyman Balik, for his contributions to the knowledge of Turkish fishes.
