= Barada spring minnow =

Conservation status
- Critically endangered, possibly extinct (IUCN 3.1)

Scientific classification
- Kingdom: Animalia
- Phylum: Chordata
- Class: Actinopterygii
- Order: Cypriniformes
- Family: Leuciscidae
- Subfamily: Leuciscinae
- Genus: Pseudophoxinus
- Species: P. syriacus

Binomial name
- Pseudophoxinus syriacus (Lortet, 1883)

Synonyms
- Rhodeus syriacus Lortet, 1883

Species of fish

The Barada spring minnow (Pseudophoxinus syriacus) is a species of freshwater ray-finned fish belonging to the family Leuciscidae, which includes the daces, Eurasian minnows and related species. It may be extinct. It is found in Lebanon and Syria.
