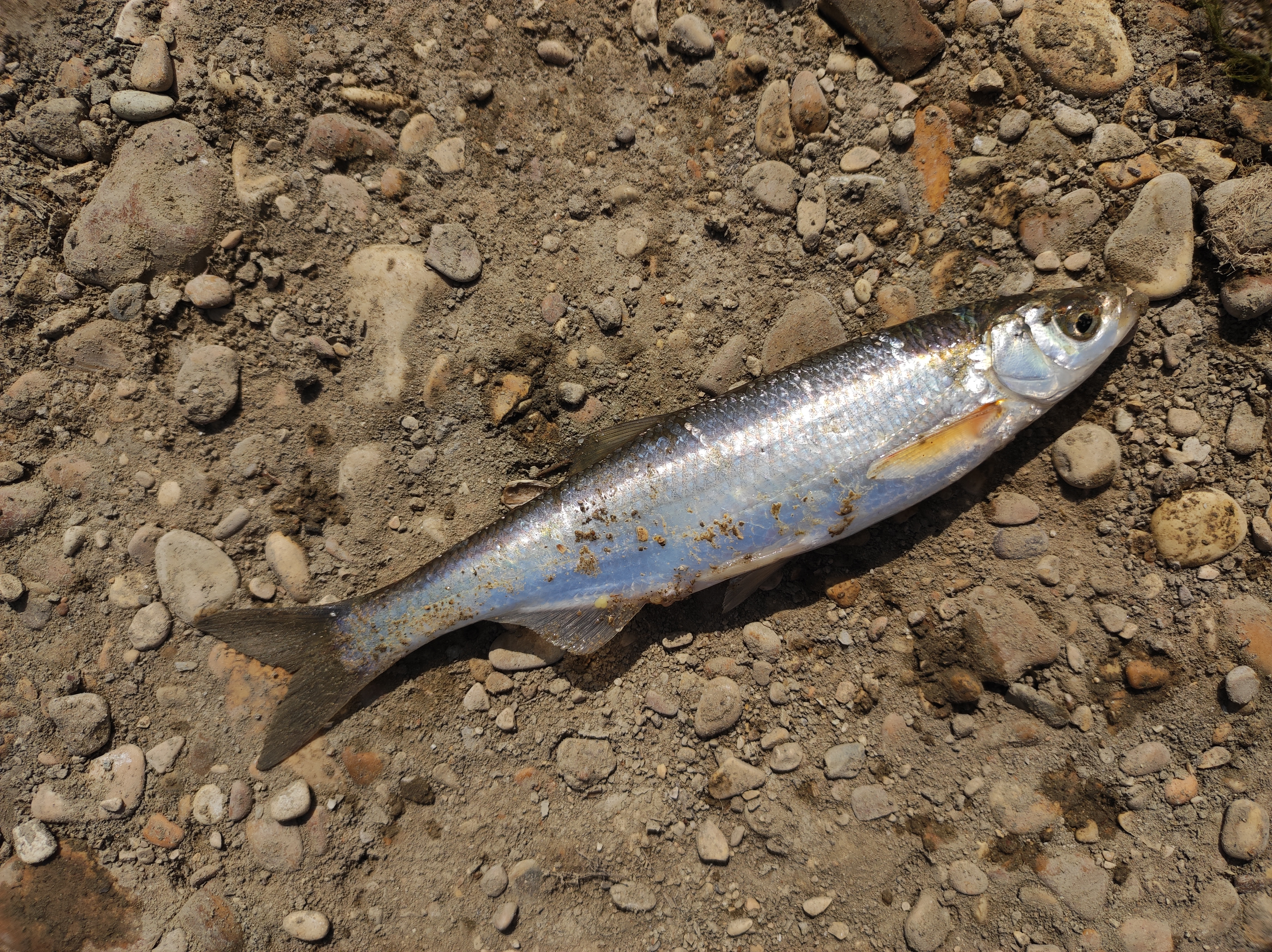

Conservation status
- Least Concern (IUCN 3.1)

Scientific classification
- Kingdom: Animalia
- Phylum: Chordata
- Class: Actinopterygii
- Order: Cypriniformes
- Family: Leuciscidae
- Subfamily: Leuciscinae
- Genus: Alburnus
- Species: A. chalcoides

Binomial name
- Alburnus chalcoides (Güldenstädt, 1772)

Synonyms
- Cyprinus chalcoides Güldenstädt, 1772; Chalcalburnus chalcoides (Güldenstädt, 1772); Cyprinus clupeoides Pallas, 1776; Leuciscus albuloides Valenciennes, 1844; Alburnus longissimus Warpachowski, 1892; Alburnus latissimus Kamensky, 1901

= Danube bleak =

Species of fish

The Danube bleak or Caspian shemaya (Alburnus chalcoides) is a species of freshwater ray-finned fish in the family Leuciscidae. It is found in Iran, Ukraine, Georgia, Armenia, Slovakia, Moldova, Greece, Czechia, Azerbaijan, Turkiye, Turkmenistan, Uzbekistan, Afghanistan, Austria, Bosnia and Herzegovina, Bulgaria, Croatia, Switzerland, Germany, Hungary, Italy, Romania, Russia, Serbia and Slovenia.

== Description ==
The Danube bleak is an elongate slim fish which can reach 40 centimetres (16 in) but a more normal size is 15 to 30 centimetres (5.9 to 11.8 in). There are 57 to 70 scales along the lateral line. The abdomen is compressed into a keel and the posterior end of this has no scales. The dorsal fin has eight to nine branched rays while the anal fin has fifteen to nineteen. This fish is morphologically quite variable which may be due to local adaptations to various habitats but is more likely to be due to several species being involved.

== Distribution ==
The Danube bleak occurs in slow flowing stretches of rivers flowing into the Black Sea and the Caspian Sea and in the Aral Sea basin, in Alpine rivers among others. It is a migratory fish, spawning in the headwaters of the rivers and then moving down to the lower parts, estuaries and brackish areas of sea. These migratory patterns have been disrupted by the building of dams across many of the rivers. Landlocked populations survive in small rivers and reservoirs, breeding in the small streams above the dams. The main Caspian Sea population has found ways of spawning below the dams. Overfishing and pollution in the Caspian Sea could impact on the Danube bleak but in 2008 the IUCN Red List of Threatened Species listed it as being of "Least concern".

== Biology ==
The Danube bleak feeds on small crustaceans, worms, molluscs, insect larvae, insects and small fish.

Male Danube bleaks assemble in May to July at spawning sites in fast flowing streams with gravel bottoms. The females arrive later and deposit about twenty thousand eggs which stick to stones and gravel. These hatch after two or three days and the larvae stay among the gravel for another ten days before moving to backwaters and shallows where they feed on zooplankton, insect larvae and algae. The juvenile fish migrate down stream in the autumn or the spring of the following year. They may become mature in four to five years.
