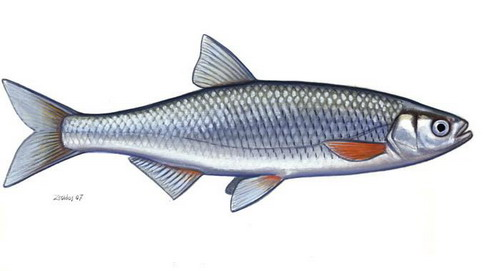

Conservation status
- Least Concern (IUCN 3.1)

Scientific classification
- Kingdom: Animalia
- Phylum: Chordata
- Class: Actinopterygii
- Division: Teleostei
- Order: Cypriniformes
- Family: Leuciscidae
- Genus: Alburnus
- Species: A. mento

Binomial name
- Alburnus mento (Heckel, 1837)

Synonyms
- Aspius mento Heckel, 1837

= Alburnus mento =

Species of fish

Alburnus mento, the lake bleak, is a species of ray-finned fish belonging to the family Leuciscidae, which includes the minnows, daces and related fishes. Its distribution is in subalpine lakes in Germany and Austria.

== Taxonomy ==
Alburnus mento was first formally described as Aspius mento in 1837 by the Austrian ichthyologist Johann Jakob Heckel with its type locality given as Lake Traunsee, near Gmunden in Austria. This taxon has been treated as a synonym of the Danube bleak (A. chalcoides) but is now regarded as a valid species. This species is classified as a member of the genus Alburnus, a genus in which many of the fishes share the English common name of bleak, within the subfamily Leuciscinae of the family Leuciscidae.

== Etymology ==
Alburnus mento belongs to the genus Alburnus a name derived from the Latin for whitefish but it also refers to the bleak, a name which means pale in English, in reference to the pale non lustrous colour of A. alburnus. The specific name, mento, is derived from the Latin mentum, meaning chin, a reference to the lower jaw of this fish protruding beyond the upper jaw.

== Distribution and habitat ==
Alburnus mento is found in subalpine lakes in the Danube drainage system in southern Germany and Austria. In Germany it is known from the Starnberger See, Chiemsee, Simssee and Waginger See, while in Austria it is found in Mondsee, Attersee, Traunsee, Grundlsee, Hallstätter See, Irrsee, and Wörthersee, as well as being introduced in Zeller See. It has also been recorded in the Danube in Germany, Austria, Slovakia and Hungary but it is not known whether it has become established there.

== Biology ==
Alburnus mento is mainly found in lakes where they feed on zooplankton. When spawning they migrate into the tributary streams of the lakes and spawn over gravel where there is a strong current, they rarely spawn in lakes. Soon after spawning the adults return to the lakes to feed, the larvae swim downstream to the lakes after hatching.
