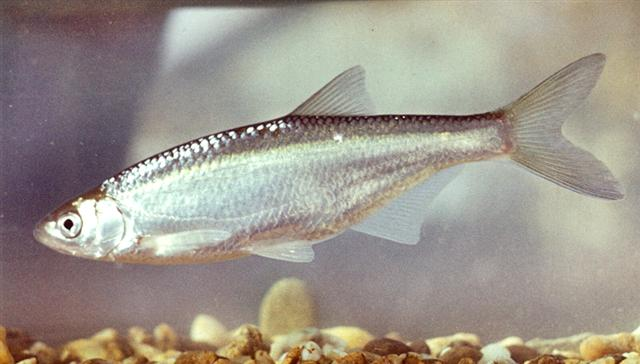
- Common bleak (Alburnus alburnus)

Scientific classification
- Kingdom: Animalia
- Phylum: Chordata
- Class: Actinopterygii
- Division: Teleostei
- Order: Cypriniformes
- Family: Leuciscidae
- Subfamily: Leuciscinae
- Genus: Alburnus; Rafinesque, 1820

Type species
- Cyprinus alburnus Linnaeus, 1758

Species
- see text

Synonyms
- Chalcalburnus Berg, 1933

= Alburnus =

Genus of fishes

Alburnus is a genus of fish in the family Leuciscidae, the daces and minnows. They are known commonly as bleaks. A group of species in the genus is known as shemayas. The genus occurs in the western Palearctic realm, and the center of diversity is in Turkey.

The genus Chalcalburnus is now part of Alburnus.

== Species ==
Currently, the following recognized species are placed in this genus:

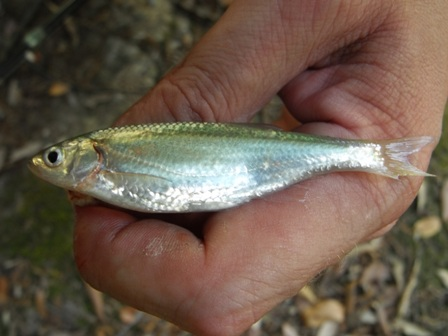
Alburnus arborella

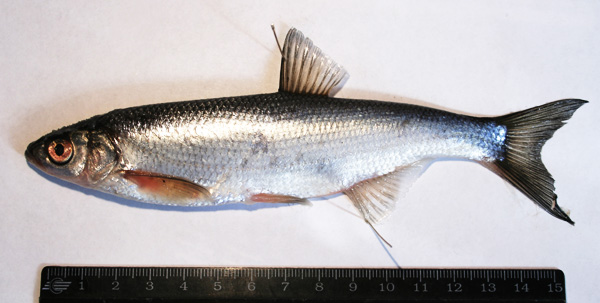
Alburnus leobergi

- Alburnus adanensis Battalgil, 1944 (Adana bleak)
- †Alburnus akili Battalgil, 1942 (Beyşehir bleak)
- Alburnus albidus (Costa 1838) (Italian bleak)
- Alburnus alburnus (Linnaeus, 1758) (Common bleak)
- Alburnus amirkabiri (Mousavi-Sabet) (Amirkabir's bleak)
- Alburnus arborella (Bonaparte 1841) (Alborella)
- Alburnus atropatenae Berg, 1925
- Alburnus attalus Özuluğ & Freyhof, 2007 (Bakır shemaya)
- Alburnus baliki Bogutskaya, Küçük & Ünlü, 2000 (Antalya bleak)
- Alburnus belvica Karaman, 1924 (Prespa bleak)
- Alburnus caeruleus Heckel, 1843 (Black spotted bleak)
- Alburnus carianorum Freyhof, Kaya, Bayçelebi, Geiger & Turan. 2019
- Alburnus carinatus Battalgil, 1941 (Manyas shemaya)
- Alburnus chalcoides (Güldenstädt, 1772) (Danube bleak)
- †Alburnus danubicus Antipa, 1909 (Danube shemaya)
- Alburnus demiri Özuluğ & Freyhof, 2008 (East Aegean bleak)
- Alburnus derjugini Berg, 1923 (Georgian shemaya)
- Alburnus doriae De Filippi, 1865
- Alburnus escherichii Steindachner, 1897 (Sakarya bleak)
- Alburnus filippii Kessler, 1877 (Kura bleak)
- Alburnus goekhani Özuluğ, Geiger & Freyhof, 2018
- Alburnus hohenackeri Kessler, 1877 (North Caucasian bleak)
- Alburnus istanbulensis Battalgil, 1941
- Alburnus kotschyi Steindachner, 1863 (Arsuz bleak)
- Alburnus kurui (Bogutskaya, 1995)
- Alburnus leobergi Freyhof & Kottelat, 2007 (Azov shemaya)
- Alburnus macedonicus Karaman, 1928 (Doiran bleak)
- Alburnus magnificus Freyhof & Turan, 2019
- Alburnus mandrensis Drensky, 1943 (Mandras bleak)
- Alburnus maximus Fatio, 1882
- Alburnus mento (Heckel, 1836) (Lake bleak)
- Alburnus mentoides Kessler, 1859 (Crimean shemaya)
- Alburnus neretvae Buj, Šanda & Perea, 2010
- †Alburnus nicaeensis Battalgil, 1941 (Iznik shemaya)
- Alburnus oblongus (Bulgakov, 1923) (Tashkent riffle bleak)
- Alburnus orontis Sauvage 1882 (Orontis spotted bleak)
- Alburnus qalilus Krupp, 1992 (Syrian spotted bleak)
- Alburnus sarmaticus Freyhof & Kottelat, 2007
- Alburnus sava Bogutskaya, Zupančič, Jelić, Diripasko & Naseka. 2017
- Alburnus schischkovi (Drensky, 1943) (Black Sea bleak)
- Alburnus scoranza Bonaparte, 1845
- Alburnus sellal Heckel, 1843. (Sellal bleak)
- Alburnus taeniatus Kessler, 1874
- Alburnus tarichi (Güldenstädt, 1814) (Tarek)
- Alburnus thessalicus Stephanidis, 1950 (Thessaly bleak)
- Alburnus timarensis Kuru, 1980
- Alburnus ulanus (Günther 1899)
- Alburnus vistonicus Freyhof & Kottelat, 2007 (Vistonis shemaja)
- Alburnus volviticus Freyhof & Kottelat, 2007 (Volvi bleak)
