= Werner Ladiges =

Werner Ladiges (August 15, 1910- November 13, 1984) was a German zoologist.

== Life ==
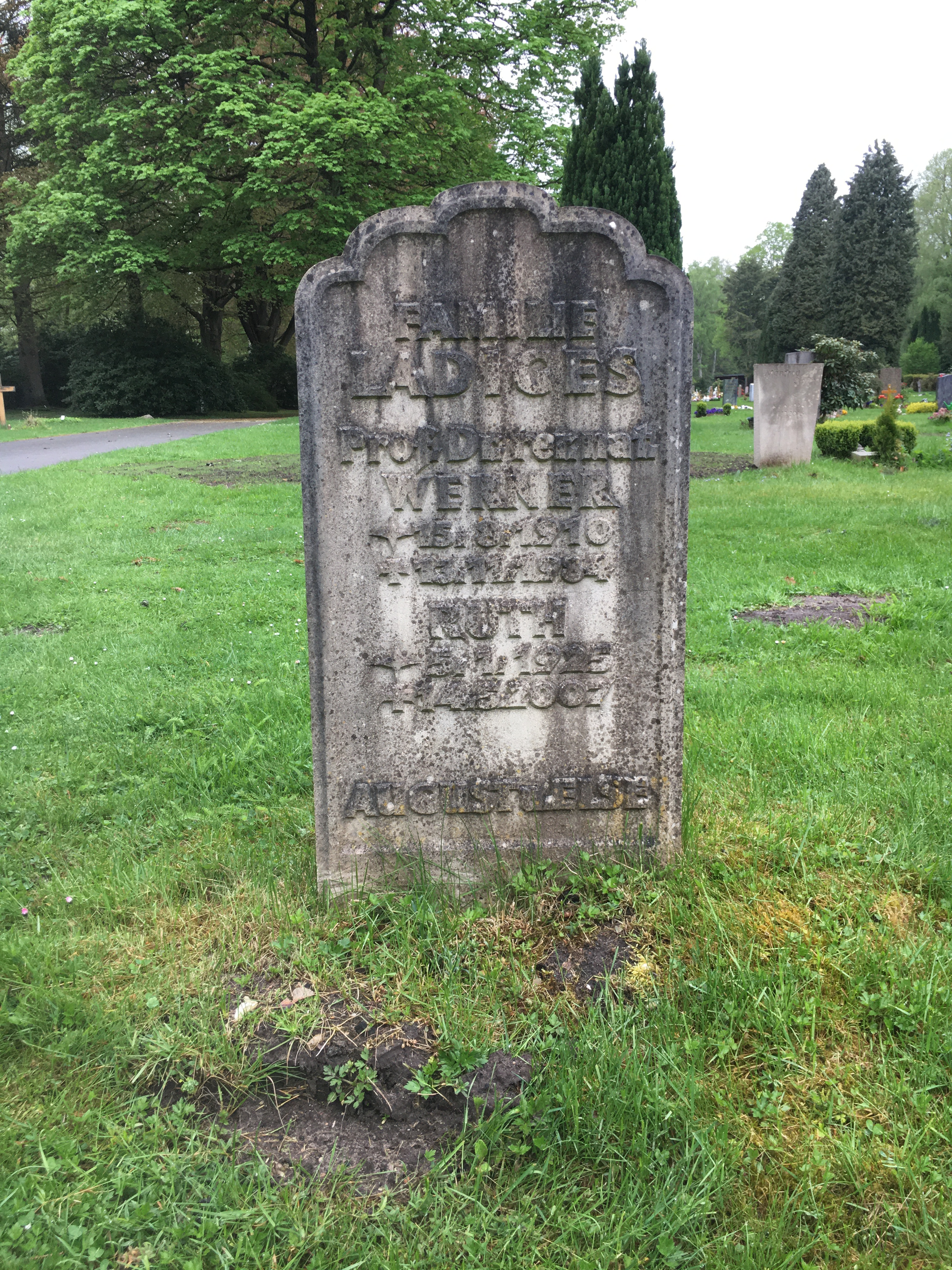
Gravesite in the Ohlsdorf Cemetery

He studied zoology in Innsbruck and Hamburg, where he received his doctorate in 1934. In the same year, his book Tropische Fische was published in the field of aquaristics, as well as numerous articles in relevant specialist journals. His main activity was as a scientific ichthyologist at the Hamburg Zoological Museum.

Ladiges managed to make a name for himself with his influential specialist book Der Fisch in der Landschaft. He is also known to aquarists for the Celebes rainbowfish (Telmatherina ladigesi, now Marosatherina ladigesi), which he discovered in 1935 and which was named after him, and for the peaceful betta Betta imbellis, which he described in 1975. For several years, Ladiges was editor of the popular aquaristic magazine TI – Tatsachen und Informationen aus der Aquaristik, which was published by the accessories manufacturer Tetra in Melle, Germany.

Werner Ladiges was buried in Ohlsdorf Cemetery, his resting place is in grid square AB 44 between Chapel 9 and the Prökelmoor.

== Works ==
- Ladiges, Werner: Zierfischbilderbuch, Verlag Gustav Wenzel & Sohn, Braunschweig 1949
- Ladiges, Werner: Der Fisch in der Landschaft, 2. Auflage Verlag Gustav Wenzel & Sohn, Braunschweig 1951
- Ladiges, Werner: Durch Dschungel und Urwald, Verlag Gustav Wenzel & Sohn, Braunschweig 1951
- Ladiges, Werner/ Vogt, Dieter: Die Süsswasserfische Europas bis zum Ural und Kaspischen Meer, Verlag Paul Parey, Hamburg, 1965
- Ladiges, Werner: Kaltwasserfische in Haus und Garten. Melle: Verlag Tetra, 1976.
- Ladiges, Werner: Schwimmendes Gold vom Rio Ukayali. Die abenteuerliche Entdeckung des Neonfisches. Wuppertal: Engelbert Pfriem Verlag, 1973.
- Frickhinger, K.A./ Ladiges, W./ Wieser, K.H: Der neue Gartenteich. Melle: Verlag Tetra, 1981.
