= Fahire Battalgil =

Turkish ichthyologist

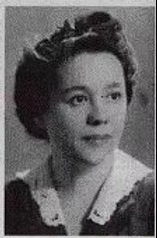
- Born: Fahire Akif Hanım; 1902; Istanbul, Turkey
- Died: 20 February 1948 (aged 45–46); Istanbul, Turkey
- Resting place: Kılıçali Yahya Efendi family cemetery in Beşiktaş
- Other name: Fahire Battalgazi
- Citizenship: Turkey
- Known for: Ichthyology

Fahire Battalgil (1902 - 1948) was a Turkish ichthyologist who was one of the first women to be appointed as a professor at a university in Turkey. She is credited as being the first Turkish scientist (male or female) to have made significant impacts in the zoological field of ichthyology and freshwater fish biodiversity. She is credited with naming and describing at least 30 species of freshwater fish endemic to Turkey.

== Name ==
Battalgil was known as Fahire Akim Hanim during the early part of her life. The surname Battalgil was adopted by her family to comply with the Republic of Turkey's 1934 Surname Law , which required using consistent, Turkish surnames, and the spelling of Battalgil was changed to Battalgazi from 1943.

== Early life ==
Battalgil was given the name Fahire Akim Hanim at her birth Istanbul either in 1902 or 1905 as there is discrepancy within reliable historical records. She attended the French school of Notre Dame de Sion in Damascus where her father, Dr Etem Akif Bey, was employed. At this school, she learned the speak French and Arabic fluently. Her secondary school was the Bezmi Alem High School from where she graduated in 1924. Her graduation from secondary school was postponed due to her father's military service in various wars. She graduated from the Darülfünun, the previous name of the Istanbul University, in 1926 with a degree in Natural Science. Her grandfather was a palace physician, so Battalgil was a third generation college graduate.

== Career ==
From April 1926 to October 1927 Battalgil had a position at the Tercan Vocational School, now part of Erzincan University where she was assigned to the Faculty of Science. She started as a biology teacher, but eventually became the headmistress at the school. Battalgil became appointed as an assistant in the Institute of Zoology in August 1927. In 1931–32, she went to study at the Sorbonne in Paris in the Department of Zoology and Comparative Anatomy. In 1933, following the reform of Turkish universities, she was appointed as an associate professor of zoology at the University of Istanbul. While in Istanbul, she taught at the Eyup Middle School as a biology teacher. During her time at Istanbul, Battalgil translated lectures from French instructors.

In November 1935 she participated in an expedition organized by the Fisheries Institute, and many such thereafter. It was primarily during these expedition that Battalgil identified and described the 30 new species of freshwater fish. With her colleague Suat Nigar, she translated the lectures of Professor Andre Naville and after his sudden death in 1937 she took those lectures herself. In 1937 she became a full associate professor, under the German Zoologist Curt Kosswig, and in 1944 she became a full professor. She was Turkey's first zoology doctor and first zoology professor. She died due to complications during a brain surgery on 20 February 1948 in Istanbul and is buried in Kılıçali Yahya Efendi family cemetery in Beşiktaş.

Throughout her career, she described at least 30 species of freshwater fish that are all endemic to Turkey. Only 15 of these described species are currently verified and considered valid by the scientific community. This discrepancy is primarily due to Battalgil's descriptions lacking the detail required in modern taxonomic descriptions of species.

== Legacy ==
Battalgil was an important figure in Turkish ichthyology discovering and describing a number of new species of freshwater fish to science. Examples include Alburnus adanensis, Barbus oligolepis, Pseudophoxinus caralis and Squalius cephaloides.

== Taxon named in her honor ==
Species named in honor of Battalgil include

- Cobitis fahireae
- Phoxinellus fahirae
- Alburnus battalgilae
- Cobitis battalgili
- Turcichondrostoma fahirae (previously Chrondrostoma fahirae)
- Psuedophoxinus battalgilae
- Gobio battalgilae

=== Publications ===
This is an incomplete list of publications:

- 1940 Eine neue Cyprinidenart [Yeni bir Cyprinid nev'i], Revue de la Faculté des Sciences de l'Université d'Istanbul, Série B: Sciences Naturelles, 5 (1–2): 74-77 (1–4).
- 1941 Les poissons des eaux douces de la Turquie [Türkiye'nin tatlısu balıkları], Revue de la Faculté des Sciences de l'Université d'Istanbul, Série B: Sciences Naturelles, 6 (1–2): 170–186.
- 1944. Türkiye'de yeni tath su bahklari. Nouveau poissons des eaux douces de la Turquie. Revue de la Faculté des Sciences de l'Université d'Instanbul, Série B: Sciences Naturelles, 9(2) [1943]: 126–133

== Taxon described by her ==
- See Category:Taxa named by Fahire Battalgil
