= Oxynoemacheilus zagrosensis =

Scientific classification
- Domain: Eukaryota
- Kingdom: Animalia
- Phylum: Chordata
- Class: Actinopterygii
- Order: Cypriniformes
- Family: Nemacheilidae
- Genus: Oxynoemacheilus
- Species: O. zagrosensis

Binomial name
- Oxynoemacheilus zagrosensis Kamangar, Prokofiev, Ghaderi & Nalbant, 2014

Species of fish

Oxynoemacheilus zagrosensis is a species of stone loach which is endemic to the Choman River in Iranian Kurdistan. It was described along with O. chomanicus, O. kurdistanicus and Turcinoemacheilus kosswigi in 2014, all four species being endemic to the Choman basin.
