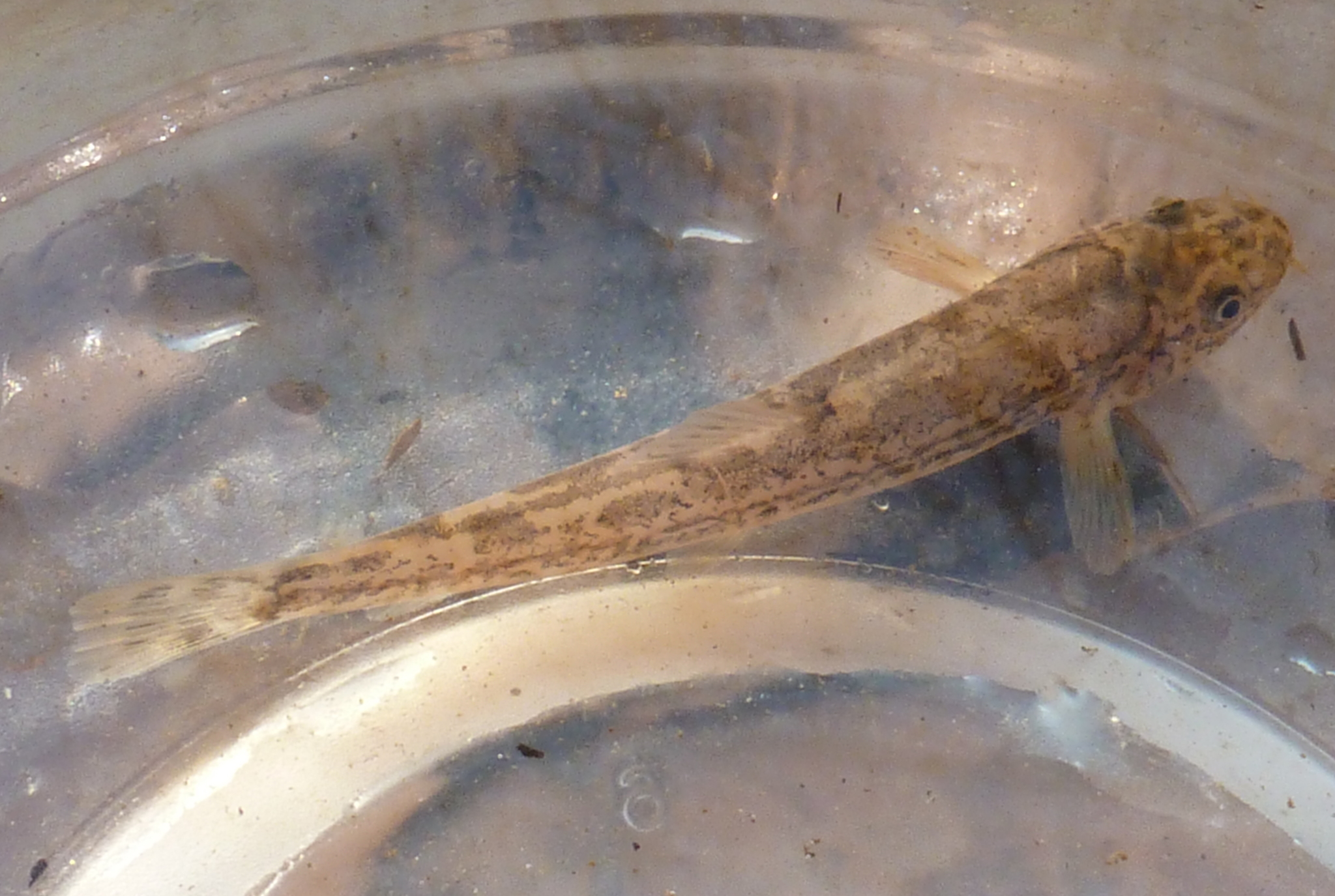
- O. insignis in the Hasbaya District, Lebanon

Conservation status
- Near Threatened (IUCN 3.1)

Scientific classification
- Kingdom: Animalia
- Phylum: Chordata
- Class: Actinopterygii
- Order: Cypriniformes
- Family: Nemacheilidae
- Genus: Oxynoemacheilus
- Species: O. insignis

Binomial name
- Oxynoemacheilus insignis (Heckel, 1843)

Synonyms
- Cobitis insignis Heckel, 1843; Nemacheilus insignis (Heckel, 1843); Orthrias insignis (Heckel, 1843); Noemacheilus angorae jordanicus Bănărescu & Nalbant, 1966; Nemacheilus jordanicus (Banarescu & Nalbant, 1966); Orthrias insignis jordanica (Banarescu & Nalbant, 1966); Orthrias jordanicus (Banarescu & Nalbant, 1966); Noemacheilus insignis tortonesei Banarescu & Nalbant, 1966; Orthrias dori Goren & Banarescu, 1982; Nemacheilus dori (Goren & Banarescu, 1982); Orthrias israeliticus Goren & Nalbant, 1982; Nemacheilus israeliticus (Goren & Nalbant, 1982); Orthrias pantheroides Goren & Nalbant, 1982; Nemacheilus pantheroides (Goren & Nalbant, 1982)

= Oxynoemacheilus insignis =

Species of fish

Oxynoemacheilus insignis is a species of stone loach It is restricted to the Damascus basin in Syria and to the Jordan-Dead Sea basin in Syria, Israel and Jordan. Its natural habitat is rivers. It is threatened by the drying up of the rivers and streams in which it is found, caused by overuse, damming and less rainfall, as well as by pollution. In Syria it has been extirpated from the Barada and can now only be found in the upper reaches of the Awaj to the west of Damascus. It is a highly variable species and different populations can differ from their neighbouring populations that in the past they have been described as species or subspecies and this has led to a large number of synonyms for Oxynoemacheilus insignis.
