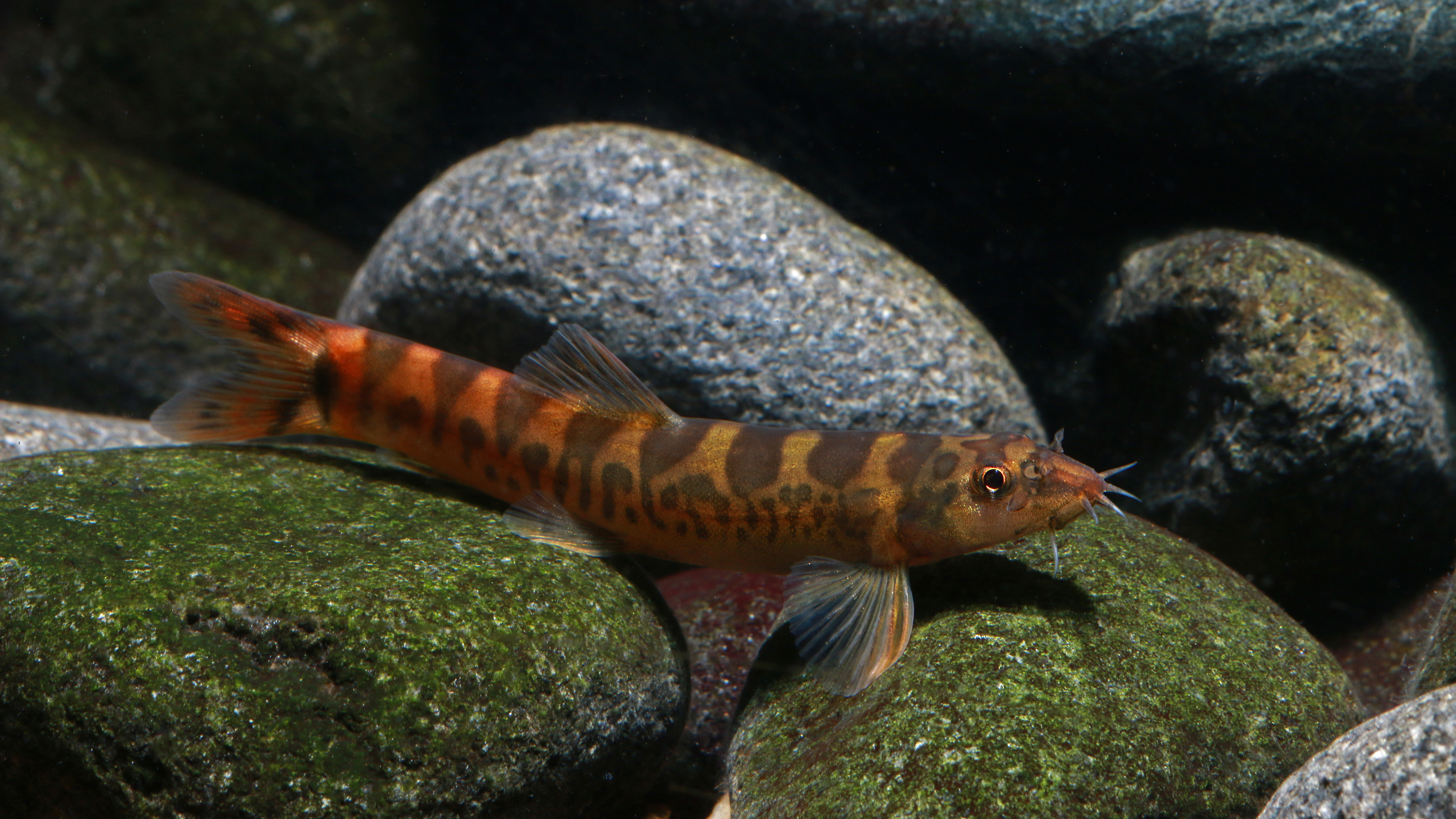
- Mesonoemacheilus petrubanarescui
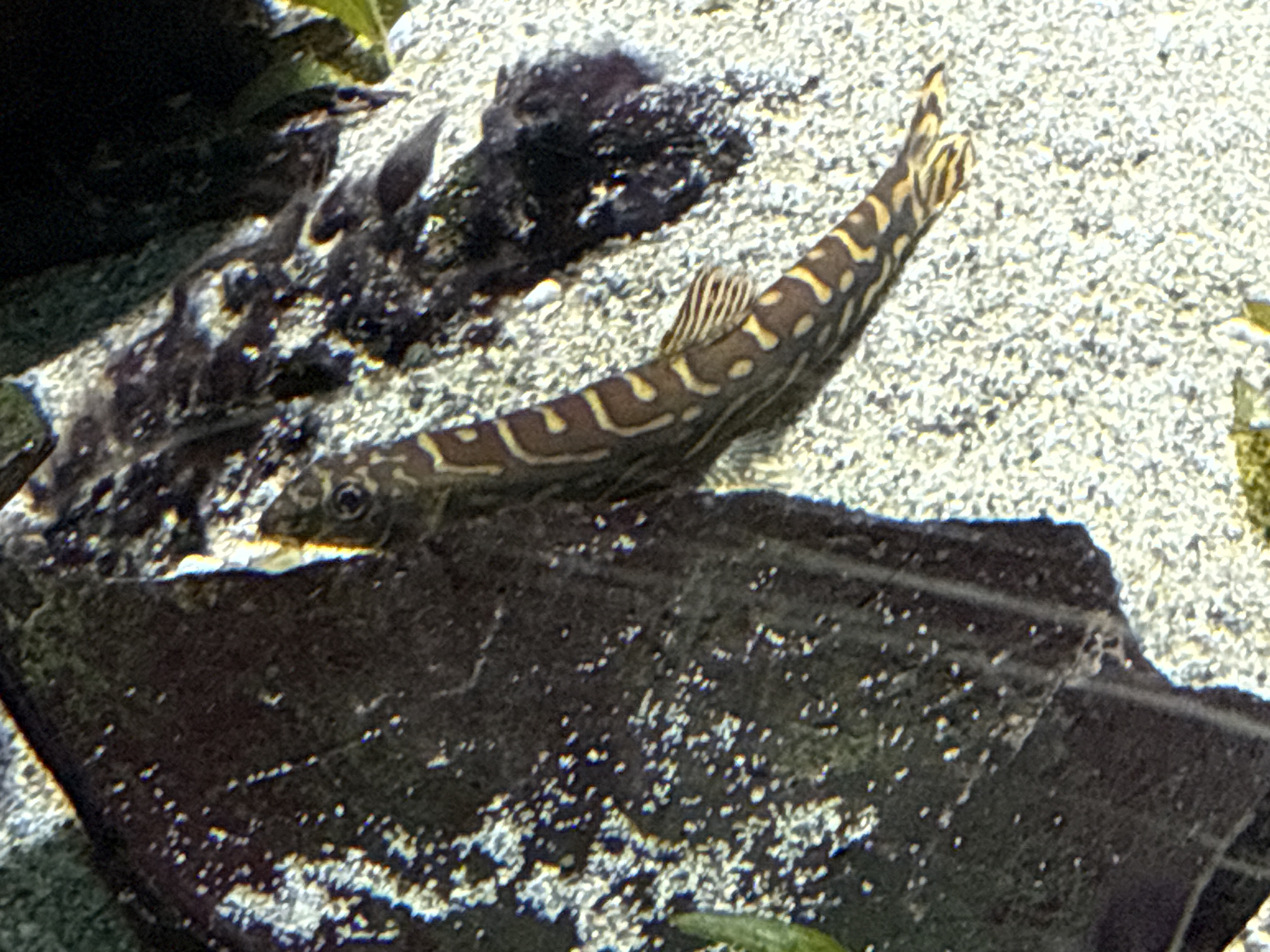
- Mesonoemacheilus triangularis

Scientific classification
- Kingdom: Animalia
- Phylum: Chordata
- Class: Actinopterygii
- Division: Teleostei
- Order: Cypriniformes
- Family: Nemacheilidae
- Genus: Mesonoemacheilus; Bănărescu & Nalbant, 1982

= Mesonoemacheilus =

Genus of fishes

Mesonoemacheilus is a genus of stone loach endemic to India.

All species are endemic to rivers draining the Western Ghats and the genus is separated from the closely related Nemacheilus by members possessing two pairs of rostral barbels which are confluent at their bases vs. rostral barbels present but not confluent.

== Species ==
These are the currently recognized species in this genus:

- Mesonoemacheilus guentheri (Day 1867)
- Mesonoemacheilus herrei Nalbant & Bănărescu, 1982
- Mesonoemacheilus menoni (Zacharias & Minimol, 1999)
- Mesonoemacheilus pambarensis (Rema Devi & Indra, 1994)
- Mesonoemacheilus periyarensis (Kurup & Radhakrishnan, 2005)
- Mesonoemacheilus petrubanarescui (Menon 1984)
- Mesonoemacheilus pulchellus (Day 1873)
- Mesonoemacheilus tambaraparniensis (Menon 1987)
- Mesonoemacheilus triangularis (Day, 1865)
