= Oxynoemacheilus eregliensis =

Conservation status
- Vulnerable (IUCN 3.1)

Scientific classification
- Kingdom: Animalia
- Phylum: Chordata
- Class: Actinopterygii
- Order: Cypriniformes
- Family: Nemacheilidae
- Genus: Oxynoemacheilus
- Species: O. eregliensis

Binomial name
- Oxynoemacheilus eregliensis Bănărescu & Nalbant, 1978

Synonyms
- Orthrias angorae eregliensis Banarescu & Nalbant, 1978; Barbatula eregliensis (Banarescu & Nalbant, 1978)

Species of fish

Oxynoemacheilus eregliensis is a species of stone loach from the streams and springs with gravel, sand or mud substrate and slowly flowing water in the area of the Lake Tuz basin in central Anatolia in Turkey.
