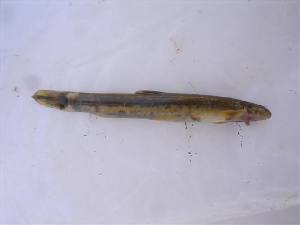
- Turcinoemacheilus kosswigi

Scientific classification
- Domain: Eukaryota
- Kingdom: Animalia
- Phylum: Chordata
- Class: Actinopterygii
- Order: Cypriniformes
- Family: Nemacheilidae
- Genus: Turcinoemacheilus; Bănărescu & Nalbant, 1964

Type species
- Turcinoemacheilus kosswigi Bănărescu & Nalbant, 1964

= Turcinoemacheilus =

Genus of fishes

Turcinoemacheilus is a genus of loaches in family Nemacheilidae native to Asia.

== Species ==
These are the currently recognized species in this genus:

- Turcinoemacheilus ansari Jouladeh-Roudbar, Vatandoust, Doadrio & Ghanavi, 2023
- Turcinoemacheilus bahaii Esmaeili, Sayyadzadeh, Özuluğ, Geiger & Freyhof, 2014
- Turcinoemacheilus christofferi Jouladeh-Roudbar, Vatandoust, Doadrio & Ghanavi, 2023
- Turcinoemacheilus ekmekciae Kaya, Yoğurtçuoğlu, Aksu, Bayçelebi & Turan, 2023
- Turcinoemacheilus hafezi Golzarianpour, Abdoli, Patimar & Freyhof, 2013
- Turcinoemacheilus himalaya Conway, Edds, Shrestha & Mayden, 2011
- Turcinoemacheilus inexpectatus Freyhof & Jouladeh-Roudbar, 2024
- Turcinoemacheilus kosswigi Bănărescu & Nalbant, 1964
- Turcinoemacheilus minimus Esmaeili, Sayyadzadeh, Özuluğ, Geiger & Freyhof, 2014
- Turcinoemacheilus moghbeli Jouladeh-Roudbar, Vatandoust, Doadrio & Ghanavi, 2023
- Turcinoemacheilus saadii Esmaeili, Sayyadzadeh, Özuluğ, Geiger & Freyhof, 2014
