= Oxynoemacheilus araxensis =

Conservation status
- Data Deficient (IUCN 3.1)

Scientific classification
- Kingdom: Animalia
- Phylum: Chordata
- Class: Actinopterygii
- Order: Cypriniformes
- Family: Nemacheilidae
- Genus: Oxynoemacheilus
- Species: O. araxensis

Binomial name
- Oxynoemacheilus araxensis (Bănărescu & Nalbant, 1978)

Synonyms
- Barbatula araxensis (Banarescu & Nalbant, 1978); Orthrias araxensis Banarescu & Nalbant, 1978

Species of fish

Oxynoemacheilus araxensis is a species of ray-finned fish in the genus Oxynoemacheilus. It was described from specimens taken at a single locality near Kandili, the type locality, the upper drainage of the Euphrates in eastern Turkey. It has never been recorded anywhere else although there are many populations of superficially similar loaches in the Euphrates drainage which have not yet been identified; these may prove to be of this species or of Oxynoemacheilus kaynaki. Its habitat appears to be moderately fast flowing streams with a gravel bottom.

== Footnotes ==
- Froese, Rainer; Pauly, Daniel (eds.). "Barbatula araxensis". FishBase.
