= Paracobitis vignai =

Scientific classification
- Domain: Eukaryota
- Kingdom: Animalia
- Phylum: Chordata
- Class: Actinopterygii
- Order: Cypriniformes
- Family: Nemacheilidae
- Genus: Paracobitis
- Species: P. vignai

Binomial name
- Paracobitis vignai Nalbant & Bianco, 1998

Species of stone loach

Paracobitis vignai is a species of stone loach found in the Sistan basin in Iran. This species reaches a length of 14.2 cm (5.6 in).
