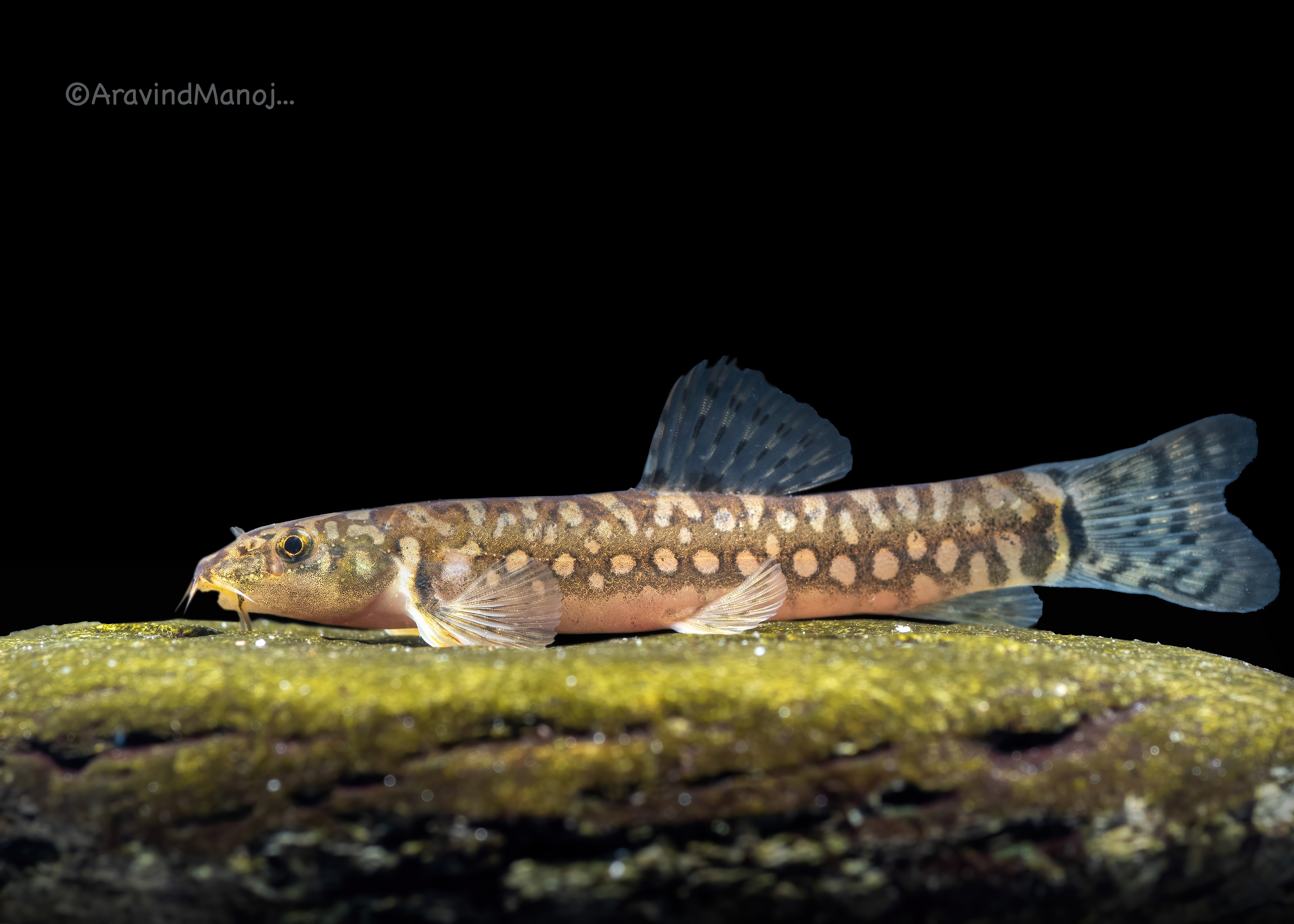

Conservation status
- Critically Endangered (IUCN 3.1)

Scientific classification
- Kingdom: Animalia
- Phylum: Chordata
- Class: Actinopterygii
- Order: Cypriniformes
- Family: Nemacheilidae
- Genus: Mesonoemacheilus
- Species: M. herrei

Binomial name
- Mesonoemacheilus herrei Nalbant & Bănărescu, 1982

= Mesonoemacheilus herrei =

Species of fish

Mesonoemacheilus herrei is a critically endangered fish described by Teodor T. Nalbant and Banarescu in 1982. It is endemic to India and is currently only recorded within the Indira Gandhi Wildlife Sanctuary and National Park in Tamil Nadu.

== Etymology ==
Named in honor of Albert W. Herre (1868-1962), ichthyologist-lichenologist, who collected the type specimen in 1941.
