= Oxynoemacheilus erdali =

Scientific classification
- Kingdom: Animalia
- Phylum: Chordata
- Class: Actinopterygii
- Order: Cypriniformes
- Family: Nemacheilidae
- Genus: Oxynoemacheilus
- Species: O. erdali

Binomial name
- Oxynoemacheilus erdali (Erk'akan, Nalbant & Özeren, 2007)

Species of fish

Oxynoemacheilus erdali is a species of Cypriniformes fish in the genus Oxynoemacheilus.

== Footnotes ==
- Froese, Rainer; Pauly, Daniel (eds.). "Barbatula erdali". FishBase.
