= Paracobitis iranica =

Scientific classification
- Domain: Eukaryota
- Kingdom: Animalia
- Phylum: Chordata
- Class: Actinopterygii
- Order: Cypriniformes
- Family: Nemacheilidae
- Genus: Paracobitis
- Species: P. iranica

Binomial name
- Paracobitis iranica Nalbant & Bianco, 1998

Species of stone loach

Paracobitis iranica, the Western crested loach is a species of stone loach endemic to Euphrates and Tigris river systems. This species reaches a length of 12.6 cm (5.0 in).
