= Oxynoemacheilus samanticus =

Conservation status
- Least Concern (IUCN 3.1)

Scientific classification
- Kingdom: Animalia
- Phylum: Chordata
- Class: Actinopterygii
- Order: Cypriniformes
- Family: Nemacheilidae
- Genus: Oxynoemacheilus
- Species: O. samanticus

Binomial name
- Oxynoemacheilus samanticus (Bănărescu & Nalbant, 1978)

Synonyms
- Orthrias brandtii samantica Bănărescu & Nalbant, 1978; Barbatula samantica (Banarescu & Nalbant, 1978); Schistura samantica (Bănărescu & Nalbant, 1978)

Species of fish

Oxynoemacheilus samanticus, the Kizilirmak sportive loach, is a species of ray-finned fish in the genus Oxynoemacheilus. It is found in streams and rivers with a fast current over gravel substrate and is endemic to eastern Anatolia, Turkey where it is found in the Kizilirmak system which drains into the Black Sea, as well as the headwaters of the Euphrates.
