= Paraschistura =

Scientific classification
- Kingdom: Animalia
- Phylum: Chordata
- Class: Actinopterygii
- Order: Cypriniformes
- Family: Nemacheilidae
- Genus: Paraschistura; Prokofiev, 2009

Type species
- Nemacheilus sargadensis Nikolskii, 1900

Synonyms
- Metaschistura Prokofiev, 2009

Genus of fishes

Paraschistura is a genus of stone loaches most of which occur in Central, South and Western Asia.

== Species ==
These are the currently recognized species in this genus:

- Paraschistura abdolii Freyhof, Sayyadzadeh, Esmaeili & Geiger, 2015
- Paraschistura alepidota (Mirza & Bănărescu, 1970)
- Paraschistura alta (Nalbant & Bianco, 1998)
- Paraschistura aredvii Freyhof, Sayyadzadeh, Esmaeili & Geiger, 2015
- Paraschistura bampurensis (Nikolskii, 1900)
- Paraschistura chrysicristinae (Nalbant, 1998) (Batman loach)
- Paraschistura cristata (Berg, 1898) (Turkmenian crested loach)
- Paraschistura delvarii Mousavi-Sabet & Eagderi, 2015 (Delvari's loach)
- Paraschistura hormuzensis Freyhof, Sayyadzadeh, Esmaeili & Geiger, 2015
- Paraschistura ilamensis Vatandoust & Eagderi, 2015
- Paraschistura kermanensis Sayyadzadeh, Teimori & Esmaeili, 2019
- Paraschistura kessleri (Günther, 1889) (Kessler's loach)
- Paraschistura lepidocaulis (Mirza & Nalbant, 1981)
- Paraschistura lindbergi (Bănărescu & Mirza, 1965)
- Paraschistura makranensis Eagderi, Mousavi-Sabet & Freyhof, 2019
- Paraschistura microlabra (Mirza & Nalbant, 1981)
- Paraschistura montana (McClelland, 1838)
- Paraschistura naseeri (N. D. Ahmad & Mirza, 1963)
- Paraschistura naumanni Freyhof, Sayyadzadeh, Esmaeili & Geiger, 2015
- Paraschistura nielseni (Nalbant & Bianco, 1998)
- Paraschistura pakistanica (Mirza & Bănărescu, 1969)
- Paraschistura prashari (Hora 1933)
- Paraschistura punjabensis (Hora, 1923)
- Paraschistura susiani Freyhof, Sayyadzadeh, Esmaeili & Geiger, 2015
- Paraschistura turcmenica (Berg, 1932)
- Paraschistura turcomana (Nikolskij, 1947)
