= Paracobitis ghazniensis =

Scientific classification
- Kingdom: Animalia
- Phylum: Chordata
- Class: Actinopterygii
- Order: Cypriniformes
- Family: Nemacheilidae
- Genus: Paracobitis
- Species: P. ghazniensis

Binomial name
- Paracobitis ghazniensis Bănărescu & Nalbant, 1966

Synonyms
- Noemacheilus ghazniensis Bănărescu & Nalbant, 1966

Species of stone loach

Paracobitis ghazniensis is a species of stone loach found in Helmand basin in Ghazni River, Helmand River basin, Afghanistan.
