= Paracobitis phongthoensis =

Scientific classification
- Kingdom: Animalia
- Phylum: Chordata
- Class: Actinopterygii
- Order: Cypriniformes
- Family: Nemacheilidae
- Genus: Paracobitis
- Species: P. phongthoensis

Binomial name
- Paracobitis phongthoensis (V. H. Nguyễn, 2005)

Synonyms
- Schistura phongthoensis (Nguyen, 2005)

Species of fish

Paracobitis phongthoensis is a species of stone loach found in Vietnam.
