= Oxynoemacheilus kosswigi =

Conservation status
- Least Concern (IUCN 3.1)

Scientific classification
- Kingdom: Animalia
- Phylum: Chordata
- Class: Actinopterygii
- Order: Cypriniformes
- Family: Nemacheilidae
- Genus: Oxynoemacheilus
- Species: O. kosswigi

Binomial name
- Oxynoemacheilus kosswigi (Erk'akan & Kuru, 1986)

Synonyms
- Orthrias angorae kosswigi Erk'akan & Kuru, 1986; Barbatula kosswigi (Erk'akan & Kuru, 1986); Oxynoemacheilus angorae kosswigi (Erk'akan & Kuru, 1986)

Species of fish

Oxynoemacheilus kosswigi, the Paphlagonian loach, is a species of ray-finned fish in the genus Oxynoemacheilus. This species is found in the Kizilirmak and Yeşilırmak drainages in northern Anatolia, Turkey. It lives in waters which vary from those with a moderately fast flow to almost still waters and prefers muddy or gravel substrates, It remains abundant and widespread within the two drainage systems in which it occurs but it is suspected that a number f populations may have declined or been made locally extinct by the increasing construction of small hydro-electric dams.
