= Schistura pakistanica =

Scientific classification
- Kingdom: Animalia
- Phylum: Chordata
- Class: Actinopterygii
- Order: Cypriniformes
- Family: Nemacheilidae
- Genus: Schistura
- Species: S. pakistanica

Binomial name
- Schistura pakistanica (Mirza & Bănărescu, 1969)

Synonyms
- Noemacheilus pakistanicus Mirza & Banarescu, 1969; Paraschistura pakistanica (Mirza & Banarescu, 1969)

Species of fish

Schistura pakistanica is a species of ray-finned fish in the genus Schistura, although some authorities have placed this stone loach in the genus Paraschistura.
