= Oxynoemacheilus banarescui =

Conservation status
- Near Threatened (IUCN 3.1)

Scientific classification
- Kingdom: Animalia
- Phylum: Chordata
- Class: Actinopterygii
- Order: Cypriniformes
- Family: Nemacheilidae
- Genus: Oxynoemacheilus
- Species: O. banarescui

Binomial name
- Oxynoemacheilus banarescui (Delmastro, 1982)

Synonyms
- Orthrias brandti banarescui Delmastro, 1982

Species of fish

Oxynoemacheilus banarescui, the Paphlagonian sportive loach, is a species of stone loach from the genus Oxynoemacheilus. It is endemic to the Filyos River in northern Turkey where it is currently widespread and abundant. However, the population appears to be declining and the causes of this are thought to be increased development of the drainage basin and the construction of new dams. This species prefers fast flowing streams with rocky or gravel bottoms and cannot survive in reservoirs, although the dams on the Fliyos are for flood control and not to create reservoirs and their impact on this species is unknown. The specific name honours Petre Mihai Bănărescu (1921-2009), a Romanian ichthyologist.
