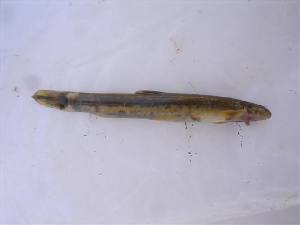

Conservation status
- Least Concern (IUCN 3.1)

Scientific classification
- Kingdom: Animalia
- Phylum: Chordata
- Class: Actinopterygii
- Division: Teleostei
- Order: Cypriniformes
- Family: Nemacheilidae
- Genus: Turcinoemacheilus
- Species: T. kosswigi

Binomial name
- Turcinoemacheilus kosswigi Bănărescu & Nalbant, 1964

= Turcinoemacheilus kosswigi =

Species of fish

Turcinoemacheilus kosswigi is a species of stone loach which is endemic to the Tigris–Euphrates Basin where it can be found in the stretches of rivers, even small streams, with faster currents and it often occurs on riffles and rapids. The specific name honours the zoologist and geneticist Curt Kosswig (1903-1982), who collected the type specimen of this species among others he collected in Turkey.
