= Oxynoemacheilus simavicus =

Conservation status
- Critically Endangered (IUCN 3.1)

Scientific classification
- Kingdom: Animalia
- Phylum: Chordata
- Class: Actinopterygii
- Order: Cypriniformes
- Family: Nemacheilidae
- Genus: Oxynoemacheilus
- Species: O. simavicus

Binomial name
- Oxynoemacheilus simavicus (Balık & Bănărescu, 1978)

Synonyms
- Barbatula simavica (Balik & Banarescu, 1978)

Species of fish

Oxynoemacheilus simavicus, the Simav loach, is a species of stone loach from the genus Oxynoemacheilus. It is endemic to a single stream, the Simav, which is a tributary of the Gediz in western Anatolia, Turkey. The populations has declined and this is caused by threats such as pollution and extraction of water leading to an evaluation of this species conservation status by the IUCN as Critically Endangered.
