= Oxynoemacheilus theophilii =

Conservation status
- Least Concern (IUCN 3.1)

Scientific classification
- Kingdom: Animalia
- Phylum: Chordata
- Class: Actinopterygii
- Order: Cypriniformes
- Family: Nemacheilidae
- Genus: Oxynoemacheilus
- Species: O. theophilii

Binomial name
- Oxynoemacheilus theophilii Stoumboudi, Kottelat & Barbieri, 2006

Synonyms
- Barbatula bergamensis Erk'akan, Nalbant & Özeren, 2007

Species of fish

Oxynoemacheilus theophilii is a species of stone loach native to Turkey and the island of Lesbos in Greece. This species occurs in streams and reaches a length of 6.6 centimetres (2.6 in) SL. It is found in the Büyük Menderes River and other streams in western Anatolia, Turkey, and the Evergetoulas Stream on the island of Lesbos, Greece. It can be found in the upper reaches of streams with clear, cold, flowing water where it hides among the stones of the stream bed. The stomach contents of a single female were found to consist of aquatic insect larvae. Water abstraction and the increased droughts caused by climate change are the main threats.

The fish is named in honor of Theophilus Chatzimichael (1873-1934), a prominent folk painter from the island of Lesbos in Greece, where the fish is endemic.
