= Paraschistura chrysicristinae =

Conservation status
- Critically endangered, possibly extinct (IUCN 3.1)

Scientific classification
- Kingdom: Animalia
- Phylum: Chordata
- Class: Actinopterygii
- Order: Cypriniformes
- Family: Nemacheilidae
- Genus: Paraschistura
- Species: P. chrysicristinae

Binomial name
- Paraschistura chrysicristinae Nalbant, 1998

Synonyms
- Schistura chrysicristinae (Nalbant, 1998)

Species of fish

Paraschistura chrysicristinae, the Diyarbakır loach or Batman River loach, is a species of ray-finned fish in the genus Paraschistura. It was recorded from two locations from the Batman River (a tributary of the upper Tigris in Turkey) in the 1970s and had not been recorded since then, until in 2021 when specimens were found in the Han stream and Sarim stream. It is thought that the fish was able to avoid discovery by being so small (3 cm) and thus able to easily slip through nets.
