= Oxynoemacheilus seyhanicola =

Conservation status
- Endangered (IUCN 3.1)

Scientific classification
- Kingdom: Animalia
- Phylum: Chordata
- Class: Actinopterygii
- Order: Cypriniformes
- Family: Nemacheilidae
- Genus: Oxynoemacheilus
- Species: O. seyhanicola

Binomial name
- Oxynoemacheilus seyhanicola (Erk'akan, Nalbant & Özeren, 2007)

Synonyms
- Schistura seyhanicola Erk'akan, Nalbant & Özeren, 2007

Species of fish

Oxynoemacheilus seyhanicola is a species of ray-finned fish in the genus Oxynoemacheilus. It is endemic to an estimated 60 km of the lower Seyhan river near Adana in Turkey where it can be found in moderately fast currents with a gravel substrate. It is threatened by dams, water extraction and climate change.
