= Oxynoemacheilus ceyhanensis =

Conservation status
- Data Deficient (IUCN 3.1)

Scientific classification
- Kingdom: Animalia
- Phylum: Chordata
- Class: Actinopterygii
- Order: Cypriniformes
- Family: Nemacheilidae
- Genus: Oxynoemacheilus
- Species: O. ceyhanensis

Binomial name
- Oxynoemacheilus ceyhanensis (Erk'akan, Nalbant & Özeren, 2007)

Synonyms
- Schistura ceyhanensis Erk'akan, Nalbant & Özeren, 2007

Species of fish

Oxynoemacheilus ceyhanensis, the Elbistan loach, is a species of Cypriniformes fish in the stone loach genus Oxynoemacheilus. It is found in moderately fast flowing streams with gravel or rocky beds and is known only from the Elbistan in upper drainage of the Ceyhan River in south eastern Turkey.
