= Paraschistura microlabra =

Conservation status
- Vulnerable (IUCN 3.1)

Scientific classification
- Kingdom: Animalia
- Phylum: Chordata
- Class: Actinopterygii
- Order: Cypriniformes
- Family: Nemacheilidae
- Genus: Paraschistura
- Species: P. microlabra

Binomial name
- Paraschistura microlabra Mirza & Nalbant, 1981

Synonyms
- Schistura microlabra Mirza & Nalbant, 1981

Species of fish

Paraschistura microlabra is a species of stone loach endemic to Pakistan.
