= Oxynoemacheilus tongiorgii =

Conservation status
- Data Deficient (IUCN 3.1)

Scientific classification
- Kingdom: Animalia
- Phylum: Chordata
- Class: Actinopterygii
- Order: Cypriniformes
- Family: Nemacheilidae
- Genus: Oxynoemacheilus
- Species: O. tongiorgii

Binomial name
- Oxynoemacheilus tongiorgii (Nalbant & Bianco, 1998)

Synonyms
- Barbatula simavica (Balik & Banarescu, 1978); Seminemacheilus tongiorgii Nalbant & Bianco, 1998

Species of fish

Oxynoemacheilus tongiorgii is a species of stone loach from the genus Oxynoemacheilus. It was found in a spring near the town of Darab in the Kul River basin of Iran. It has only been recorded once.

The fish is named in honor of Paolo Tongiorgi (1936–2018) of the University of Modena, who as co-editor of the Italian Journal of Zoology, helped in the final editing of the special volume in which this fish's description appeared.
