= Paraschistura alepidota =

Conservation status
- Vulnerable (IUCN 3.1)

Scientific classification
- Kingdom: Animalia
- Phylum: Chordata
- Class: Actinopterygii
- Order: Cypriniformes
- Family: Nemacheilidae
- Genus: Paraschistura
- Species: P. alepidota

Binomial name
- Paraschistura alepidota (Mirza & Bănărescu, 1970)

Synonyms
- Schistura alepidota (Mirza & Banarescu, 1970); Nemacheilus rupicola subsp. alepidotus Mirza & Bănărescu, 1970; Nemacheilus alepidotus Mirza & Banarescu, 1970

Species of fish

Paraschistura alepidota is a species of stone loach found in the Madyan River in Pakistan, where it is endemic. It may also occur in Afghanistan and the Indus River in China.
