= Oxynoemacheilus evreni =

Conservation status
- Least Concern (IUCN 3.1)

Scientific classification
- Kingdom: Animalia
- Phylum: Chordata
- Class: Actinopterygii
- Order: Cypriniformes
- Family: Nemacheilidae
- Genus: Oxynoemacheilus
- Species: O. evreni

Binomial name
- Oxynoemacheilus evreni (Erk’akan, Nalbant & Özeren, 2007)

Synonyms
- Schistura evreni Erk’akan, Nalbant & Özeren, 2007

Species of fish

Oxynoemacheilus evreni is a species of freshwater fish in the genus Oxynoemacheilus, belonging to the order Cypriniformes. It is widely distributed and locally abundant within the Ceyhan drainage, where it inhabits streams and rivers with gravel substrate and fast to very fast currents. Although, its population may have experienced a slight decline due to dam construction, the species has shown tolerance to some human-altered habitats.

The fish is named in honor of the son, Evren Erk’akan (b. 1987) of the senior author.
