= Oxynoemacheilus persa =

Scientific classification
- Kingdom: Animalia
- Phylum: Chordata
- Class: Actinopterygii
- Order: Cypriniformes
- Family: Nemacheilidae
- Genus: Oxynoemacheilus
- Species: O. persa

Binomial name
- Oxynoemacheilus persa (Heckel, 1848)

Synonyms
- Cobitis persa Heckel, 1847; Barbatula persa (Heckel, 1847); Nemacheilus persa (Heckel, 1847); Orthrias persus (Heckel, 1847); Barbatula farsica (Nalbant& Bianco, 1998)

Species of fish

Oxynoemacheilus persa is a species of ray-finned fish in the genus Oxynoemacheilus. The species is found in Urmia Lake and the Polvar and Kor rivers in western Iran.

== Footnotes ==
- Froese, Rainer; Pauly, Daniel (eds.). "Barbatula persa". FishBase.
