= Paraschistura nielseni =

Scientific classification
- Kingdom: Animalia
- Phylum: Chordata
- Class: Actinopterygii
- Order: Cypriniformes
- Family: Nemacheilidae
- Genus: Paraschistura
- Species: P. nielseni

Binomial name
- Paraschistura nielseni (Nalbant & Bianco, 1998)

Synonyms
- Schistura nielseni Nalbant & Bianco, 1998

Species of fish

Paraschistura nielseni is a species of ray-finned fish in the genus Paraschistura. This stone loach is found in the Helleh River and Mond River which drain into the northern Persian Gulf in Iran.

== Footnotes ==
- Froese, Rainer; Pauly, Daniel (eds.). "Schistura nielseni". FishBase.
