= Oxynoemacheilus anatolicus =

Conservation status
- Endangered (IUCN 3.1)

Scientific classification
- Kingdom: Animalia
- Phylum: Chordata
- Class: Actinopterygii
- Order: Cypriniformes
- Family: Nemacheilidae
- Genus: Oxynoemacheilus
- Species: O. anatolicus

Binomial name
- Oxynoemacheilus anatolicus Erk'akan, Özeren & Nalbant, 2008

Species of fish

Oxynoemacheilus anatolicus, the Burdur loach, is a species of stone loach in the genus Oxynoemacheilus. It has been only recorded from three spring fed streams which used to drain into Lake Burdur in south-western Anatolia, Turkey. Its habitat is streams with a slow current flowing through dense aquatic vegetation over a bed of sand, mud or gravel. It is still found in the three streams and in one it is said to be abundant but it is still threatened by water extraction, pollution and dam construction. In addition, waterbodies in the area it is found in are drying out because of climate change and unsustainable extraction of water for human use.

Oxynoemacheilus anatolicus is distinguished from its congeners by having a dorsal fin which has 5 spines and 7 branched rays, the pectoral fin with 8 branched rays, the length of the pectoral fin and a caudal fin with 18 branched rays, its body and head shape with the depth of the head, body and caudal peduncle being distinct. Its body colouration is also different and it has very small irregular spots in rings in life.
