= Oxynoemacheilus longipinnis =

Scientific classification
- Kingdom: Animalia
- Phylum: Chordata
- Class: Actinopterygii
- Order: Cypriniformes
- Family: Nemacheilidae
- Genus: Oxynoemacheilus
- Species: O. longipinnis

Binomial name
- Oxynoemacheilus longipinnis (Coad & Nalbant, 2005)

Synonyms
- Ilamnemacheilus longipinnis Coad & Nalbant, 2005

Species of fish

Oxynoemacheilus longipinnis is a species of loach in the family Nemacheilidae endemic to the Meymeh River, formerly a part of the Tigris-Euphrates system in Iran. Fishbase lists it as the only species in the monotypic genus Ilamnemacheilus.
