= Oxynoemacheilus hazarensis =

Scientific classification
- Domain: Eukaryota
- Kingdom: Animalia
- Phylum: Chordata
- Class: Actinopterygii
- Order: Cypriniformes
- Family: Nemacheilidae
- Genus: Oxynoemacheilus
- Species: O. hazarensis

Binomial name
- Oxynoemacheilus hazarensis Freyhof & Özuluǧ, 2017

Species of fish

Oxynoemacheilus hazarensis is a species of stone loach which is endemic to Lake Hazar in Turkey and which was described in 2017. Lake Hazar is one of the sources of the Tigris, if O. hazarensis is confirmed to be endemic to Lake Hazar it will be third fish species endemic to that lake, the others being the cyprinodontid Aphanius asquamatus and the cyprinid Alburnus heckeli.
