= Paraschistura alta =

Scientific classification
- Domain: Eukaryota
- Kingdom: Animalia
- Phylum: Chordata
- Class: Actinopterygii
- Order: Cypriniformes
- Family: Nemacheilidae
- Genus: Paraschistura
- Species: P. alta

Binomial name
- Paraschistura alta (Nalbant & Bianco, 1998)

Synonyms
- Schistura alta Nalbant & Bianco, 1998

Species of fish

Paraschistura alta is a species of ray-finned fish in the genus Paraschistura from the Helmand River in Afghanistan.
