= Oxynoemacheilus paucilepis =

Conservation status
- Endangered (IUCN 3.1)

Scientific classification
- Kingdom: Animalia
- Phylum: Chordata
- Class: Actinopterygii
- Order: Cypriniformes
- Family: Nemacheilidae
- Genus: Oxynoemacheilus
- Species: O. paucilepis

Binomial name
- Oxynoemacheilus paucilepis (Erk'akan, Nalbant & Özeren, 2007)

Synonyms
- Barbatula paucilepis Erk'Akan, Nalbant & Özeren, 2007

Species of fish

Oxynoemacheilus paucilepis, the Mancilik dwarf loach, is a species of ray-finned fish in the genus Oxynoemacheilus. This species is endemic to the Mancilik, Cetinkaya and Kalkam streams at the headwaters of the Euphrates in eastern Anatolia, Turkey. It may have been extirpated from the Mancilik after none were found at the type locality in 2008, but it was found to be abundant at another locality on the same stream in 2009. Its preferred habitat is small streams with gravel beds and a moderately fast current.
