= Paraschistura lindbergi =

Conservation status
- Data Deficient (IUCN 3.1)

Scientific classification
- Kingdom: Animalia
- Phylum: Chordata
- Class: Actinopterygii
- Order: Cypriniformes
- Family: Nemacheilidae
- Genus: Paraschistura
- Species: P. lindbergi

Binomial name
- Paraschistura lindbergi (Bănărescu & Mirza, 1965)

Synonyms
- Noemacheilus lindbergi Banarescu & Mirza, 1965; Nemacheilus lindbergi (Banarescu & Mirza, 1965); Schistura lindbergi (Banarescu & Mirza, 1965)

Species of fish

Paraschistura lindbergi is a species of stone loach found in Afghanistan and Pakistan.
