= Paraschistura lepidocaulis =

Conservation status
- Vulnerable (IUCN 3.1)

Scientific classification
- Kingdom: Animalia
- Phylum: Chordata
- Class: Actinopterygii
- Order: Cypriniformes
- Family: Nemacheilidae
- Genus: Paraschistura
- Species: P. lepidocaulis

Binomial name
- Paraschistura lepidocaulis (Mirza & Nalbant, 1981)

Synonyms
- Schistura lepidocaulis Mirza & Nalbant, 1981

Species of fish

Paraschistura lepidocaulis is a species of stone loach that is endemic to Pakistan.
