= Oxynoemacheilus mediterraneus =

Conservation status
- Least Concern (IUCN 3.1)

Scientific classification
- Kingdom: Animalia
- Phylum: Chordata
- Class: Actinopterygii
- Order: Cypriniformes
- Family: Nemacheilidae
- Genus: Oxynoemacheilus
- Species: O. mediterraneus

Binomial name
- Oxynoemacheilus mediterraneus (Erk'akan, Nalbant & Özeren, 2007)

Synonyms
- Barbatula mediterraneus Erk'Akan, Nalbant & Özeren, 2007

Species of fish

Oxynoemacheilus mediterraneus, the Pamphylian loach, is a species of Cypriniformes fish in the genus Oxynoemacheilus. This species is found in the Lake Eğirdir drainage of central Anatolia and in the Aksu and Küpü rivers draining to the Gulf of Antalya. It is widespread and is normally abundant in streams with fast flowing currents to almost standing waters . It is, however, locally decreasing due to dam constructions and is also threatened by pollution and water abstraction, as well as by reduced regional rainfall due to climate change.
