= Oxynoemacheilus germencicus =

Conservation status
- Vulnerable (IUCN 3.1)

Scientific classification
- Kingdom: Animalia
- Phylum: Chordata
- Class: Actinopterygii
- Order: Cypriniformes
- Family: Nemacheilidae
- Genus: Oxynoemacheilus
- Species: O. germencicus

Binomial name
- Oxynoemacheilus germencicus (Erk'akan, Nalbant & Özeren, 2007)

Synonyms
- Barbatula germencica Erk'Akan, Nalbant & Özeren, 2007

Species of fish

Oxynoemacheilus germencicus, the Carian loach, is a species of Cypriniformes fish in the genus Oxynoemacheilus. It is known only from the Büyük Menderes River and lower Gediz River in western Anatolia, it probably also occurred in the Kücük Menderes, a river which sits between the Büyük Menderes and Gediz, and has been extirpated from that river by pollution and abstraction. It remains widespread and locally abundant in the other two rivers but the populations have declined and the species is threatened by climate change reducing rainfall in the area and human activities such as damming and water abstraction as well as pollution>

== Footnotes ==
- Froese, Rainer; Pauly, Daniel (eds.). "Barbatula germencica". FishBase.
