= Oxynoemacheilus seyhanensis =

Conservation status
- Critically Endangered (IUCN 3.1)

Scientific classification
- Kingdom: Animalia
- Phylum: Chordata
- Class: Actinopterygii
- Order: Cypriniformes
- Family: Nemacheilidae
- Genus: Oxynoemacheilus
- Species: O. seyhanensis

Binomial name
- Oxynoemacheilus seyhanensis (Bănărescu, 1968)

Synonyms
- Noemacheilus tigris seyhanensis (Bănărescu, 1968); Barbatula seyhanensis (Bănărescu, 1968)

Species of fish

Oxynoemacheilus seyhanensis, the Samanti loach, is a species of ray-finned fish in the family Nemacheilidae. It is found only in Turkey. Its natural habitat is rivers. It is threatened by habitat loss.
