= Angora loach =

Conservation status
- Least Concern (IUCN 3.1)

Scientific classification
- Kingdom: Animalia
- Phylum: Chordata
- Class: Actinopterygii
- Order: Cypriniformes
- Family: Nemacheilidae
- Genus: Oxynoemacheilus
- Species: O. angorae

Binomial name
- Oxynoemacheilus angorae (Steindachner, 1897)

Synonyms
- Nemacheilus angorae Steindachner, 1897; Barbatula angorae (Steindachner, 1897)

Species of fish

Angora loach (Oxynoemacheilus angorae) is a species of ray-finned fish in the family Nemacheilidae. It is found in Israel, Jordan, Lebanon, Syria, and Turkey. It is found in Sea of Marmara and Black Sea from Simav east to Kızılırmak River drainages and drainages of Ilgin, Lake Akşehir and Lake Eber.

It is threatened by water abstraction, pollution and dam construction. The future threats in the southern range are increasing water abstraction and droughts. In the northern range, it is already and will continue to be threatened by massive development of hydropower dams. Although IUCN listed it as Data Deficient in 1996, it now lists the species as Least Concern due to its widespread abundance. The report says it is so abundant that even a 30% decrease would not endanger the species. Nonetheless, the exact population is unknown and is not known to be fished for commercial use.

== Sources ==
- Froese, Rainer; Pauly, Daniel (eds.). "Oxynoemacheilus angorae". FishBase. June 2011 version.
