= Kessler's loach =

Conservation status
- Least Concern (IUCN 3.1)

Scientific classification
- Kingdom: Animalia
- Phylum: Chordata
- Class: Actinopterygii
- Order: Cypriniformes
- Family: Nemacheilidae
- Genus: Paraschistura
- Species: P. kessleri

Binomial name
- Paraschistura kessleri (Günther, 1889)

Synonyms
- Nemacheilus kessleri Günther, 1889; Noemacheilus kessleri (Günther, 1889); Schistura kessleri (Günther, 1889); Nemacheilus sargadensis Nikolskii, 1900; Paraschistura sargadensis (Nikolskii, 1900); Schistura sargadensis (Nikolskii, 1900)

Species of fish

Kessler's loach, or the Pishin Lora loach, (Paraschistura kessleri) is a species of stone loach found in the countries of Iran, Afghanistan and Pakistan, from the Gulf of Oman to the Caspian Sea.
