= Kura loach =

Conservation status
- Least Concern (IUCN 3.1)

Scientific classification
- Kingdom: Animalia
- Phylum: Chordata
- Class: Actinopterygii
- Order: Cypriniformes
- Family: Nemacheilidae
- Genus: Oxynoemacheilus
- Species: O. brandtii

Binomial name
- Oxynoemacheilus brandtii (Kessler, 1877)

Synonyms
- Barbatula brandtii (Kessler, 1877); Nemacheilus brandti Kessler, 1877; Orthrias brandtii (Kessler, 1877)

Species of fish

The Kura loach (Oxynoemacheilus brandtii), also known as the Caspian sportive loach, is an Asian species of freshwater fish, occurring in the drainage basin of the Kura in Armenia, Azerbaijan, Turkey and Iran. It prefers fast to very fast flowing streams and rivers which have a gravel or rocky substrate and is most frequently recorded among riffles and rapids in the middle of stream. It is widespread and locally abundant but populations have been lost due to the construction of dams for hydroelectric power and for abstraction.

== Etymology ==
The specific nane honours the German naturalist Johann Friedrich von Brandt (1802-1879), who provided Karl Kessler with most of the specimens he used to describe this species.

== Footnotes ==
- Froese, Rainer; Pauly, Daniel, eds. (2014). "Oxynoemacheilus brandtii". FishBase.
