= Oxynoemacheilus frenatus =

Conservation status
- Least Concern (IUCN 3.1)

Scientific classification
- Kingdom: Animalia
- Phylum: Chordata
- Class: Actinopterygii
- Order: Cypriniformes
- Family: Nemacheilidae
- Genus: Oxynoemacheilus
- Species: O. frenatus

Binomial name
- Oxynoemacheilus frenatus (Heckel, 1843)

Synonyms
- Cobitis frenata Heckel, 1843; Barbatula frenata (Heckel, 1843); Nemacheilus frenatus (Heckel, 1843); Orthrias frenatus (Heckel, 1843)

Species of fish

Oxynoemacheilus frenatus, the banded Tigris loach, is a species of ray-finned fish in the genus Oxynoemacheilus. This species is widespread in the upper drainage basin of the Tigris in Turkey, Syria and Iraq where it can be locally very common. It can be found in habitats varying from streams with a moderately fast current to near standing waters in springs, streams and rivers which have beds of gravel or mud. Academically speaking, it inhabits fast-flowing streams and rivers with rocky substrates.

== Taxonomy ==
Oxynoemacheilus frenatus was first described by the ichthyologist Karl Kessler in 1877. It belongs to the genus Oxynoemacheilus, which includes several species of small, benthic fishes found in the Middle East and Central Asia.

== Physical description ==
Oxynoemacheilus frenatus is a small, elongated fish, typically reaching lengths of up to 8 cm. It has a streamlined body adapted to life in fast-flowing waters, with a pale brown coloration and dark mottled patterns that provide camouflage against the riverbed.

== Habitat and Distribution ==
This species is endemic to the river systems of Turkey, particularly in the Anatolian Peninsula. It prefers fast-flowing, oxygen-rich streams with rocky or gravel substrates, where it can find shelter among the stones and feed on small invertebrates.

== Behaviour and Ecology ==
Oxynoemacheilus frenatus is a benthic species, meaning it spends most of its time on or near the bottom of the water body. It is known for its agility in navigating rocky substrates and its ability to cling to surfaces in strong currents. Its diet consists primarily of small invertebrates and organic detritus.

== Reproduction ==
The breeding season for Oxynoemacheilus frenatus occurs in late spring and early summer. Females lay eggs in hidden crevices among the rocks, where the eggs are protected from predators and strong currents. The eggs hatch into free-swimming larvae after a few days.

== Conservation status ==
Oxynoemacheilus frenatus is currently listed as Least Concern on the IUCN Red List, but its populations are potentially threatened by habitat destruction, water pollution, and river damming. Conservation efforts are needed to ensure the preservation of its natural habitats and biodiversity.
