= Oxynoemacheilus kiabii =

Scientific classification
- Domain: Eukaryota
- Kingdom: Animalia
- Phylum: Chordata
- Class: Actinopterygii
- Order: Cypriniformes
- Family: Nemacheilidae
- Genus: Oxynoemacheilus
- Species: O. kiabii

Binomial name
- Oxynoemacheilus kiabii Golzarianpour, Abdoli & Freyhof, 2011

Species of fish

Oxynoemacheilus kiabii is a species of stone loach from the genus Oxynoemacheilus which is endemic to the Karkheh River drainage in Iran. The authors Kiavash Golzarianpour, Asghar Abdoli and Jörg Freyhof gave the specific name kiabii in honour of the Iranian conservationist Bahram H. Kiabi to show their appreciation for his work in conserving Iran's vertebrate fauna, especially the fish.
