= Oxynoemacheilus kaynaki =

Conservation status
- Least Concern (IUCN 3.1)

Scientific classification
- Kingdom: Animalia
- Phylum: Chordata
- Class: Actinopterygii
- Order: Cypriniformes
- Family: Nemacheilidae
- Genus: Oxynoemacheilus
- Species: O. kaynaki

Binomial name
- Oxynoemacheilus kaynaki Erk'Akan, Özeren & Nalbant, 2008

Species of fish

Oxynoemacheilus kaynaki, the medil loach, is a species of stome loach which is found in the Göksu, a right hand tributary of the Euphrates in southeast Anatolia, Turkey.

The fish is named in honor of Hüseyin Kaynak, the father of senior author.
