= Oxynoemacheilus hamwii =

Conservation status
- Endangered (IUCN 3.1)

Scientific classification
- Kingdom: Animalia
- Phylum: Chordata
- Class: Actinopterygii
- Order: Cypriniformes
- Family: Nemacheilidae
- Genus: Oxynoemacheilus
- Species: O. hamwii

Binomial name
- Oxynoemacheilus hamwii (Krupp & W. Schneider, 1991)

Synonyms
- Nemacheilus hamwii Krupp & W. Schneider, 1991

Species of fish

Oxynoemacheilus hamwii, the Orontes sportive loach, is a species of ray-finned fish in the genus Oxynoemacheilus. This species is found in the headwaters of the Orontes River but is now restricted to three streams in the Turkish part of the drainage, two joining the lower Orontes in Turket and the third flowing into the Afrin River in Syria, and has been extirpated from Syria. It was described as being very common in the late 20th century, but it is sensitive to pollution and requires clear, flowing streams over mud or gravel. The drainage of the Orontes is heavily used by humans and lower rainfall in the region caused by climate change may exacerbate the threat to this species by increasing the amount of water taken from the streams by humans and by lowering the water table.

== Etymology ==
The fish is named in honor of Adel Hamwi, who was a Professor of Zoology at the University of Damascus, for his contributions to Syrian zoology and for helping the authors in the field.

== Footnotes ==
- Froese, Rainer; Pauly, Daniel (eds.). "Nemacheilus hamwii". FishBase.
