= Oxynoemacheilus karunensis =

Scientific classification
- Domain: Eukaryota
- Kingdom: Animalia
- Phylum: Chordata
- Class: Actinopterygii
- Order: Cypriniformes
- Family: Nemacheilidae
- Genus: Oxynoemacheilus
- Species: O. karunensis

Binomial name
- Oxynoemacheilus karunensis Freyhof, 2016

Species of fish

Oxynoemacheilus karunensis is a species of stone loach which is endemic to Iran. It was first described in 2016.
