= Mesonoemacheilus menoni =

Conservation status
- Vulnerable (IUCN 3.1)

Scientific classification
- Kingdom: Animalia
- Phylum: Chordata
- Class: Actinopterygii
- Division: Teleostei
- Order: Cypriniformes
- Family: Nemacheilidae
- Genus: Mesonoemacheilus
- Species: M. menoni

Binomial name
- Mesonoemacheilus menoni (Zacharias & Minimol, 1999)

Synonyms
- Nemacheilus menoni Zacharias & Minimol, 1999

Species of fish

Mesonoemacheilus menoni is a species of ray-finned fish in the genus Mesonoemacheilus. It is endemic to the southern Western Ghats in Kerala, India, where it occurs in the upper reaches of the Periyar River over substrates of cobbles, pebbles and sand in flowing water. It is common within the Periyar Tiger Reserve but may be threatened by predation and competition from the invasive African cichlid Mozambique tilapia, the common carp and Clarias gariepinus.
