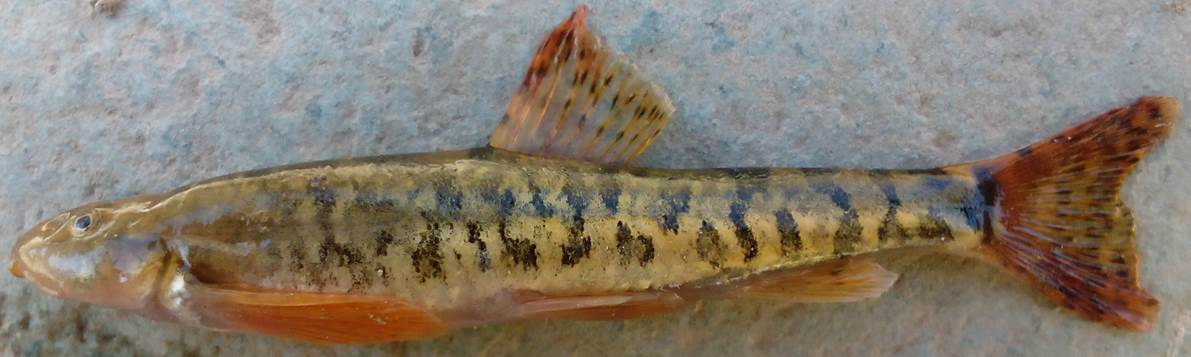

Conservation status
- Least Concern (IUCN 3.1)

Scientific classification
- Kingdom: Animalia
- Phylum: Chordata
- Class: Actinopterygii
- Order: Cypriniformes
- Family: Nemacheilidae
- Genus: Oxynoemacheilus
- Species: O. bergianus

Binomial name
- Oxynoemacheilus bergianus (Derjavin, 1934)

Synonyms
- Barbatula bergiana (Derjavin, 1934); Nemacheilus bergianus Derjavin, 1934; Orthrias bergianus (Derjavin, 1934)

= Oxynoemacheilus bergianus =

Species of fish

Oxynoemacheilus bergianus, the Kura sportive loach, is a species of ray-finned fish in the genus Oxynoemacheilus. This species is found in Lake Urumiyeh and Namak Lake basins in Iran, in the southern Caspian basin from Kura east to the Sefid-Rud drainage. It can also be found in the headwaters of Tigris in Turkey, Iraq and in Karoun, Iran as well as those of the Euphrates in Turkey and possibly in Syria and Iraq. It lives in fast flowing streams and rivers with gravel and rocky substrates and does not tolerate impoundments, dam construction having been identified as a major potential threat to this species.

The fish is named in honor of ichthyologist Lev (also Leo) Semyonovich Berg (1876-1950).
