= Oxynoemacheilus leontinae =

Conservation status
- Least Concern (IUCN 3.1)

Scientific classification
- Kingdom: Animalia
- Phylum: Chordata
- Class: Actinopterygii
- Order: Cypriniformes
- Family: Nemacheilidae
- Genus: Oxynoemacheilus
- Species: O. leontinae

Binomial name
- Oxynoemacheilus leontinae (Lortet, 1883)

Synonyms
- Nemacheilus leontinae Lortet, 1883

Species of fish

Oxynoemacheilus leontinae is a species of stone loach found in the Jordan and Litani river systems in Israel, Lebanon, and Syria. Its natural habitat is slow moving rivers.
