= Eastern crested loach =

Scientific classification
- Domain: Eukaryota
- Kingdom: Animalia
- Phylum: Chordata
- Class: Actinopterygii
- Order: Cypriniformes
- Family: Nemacheilidae
- Genus: Paracobitis
- Species: P. longicauda

Binomial name
- Paracobitis longicauda (Kessler, 1872)

Synonyms
- Cobitis longicauda Kessler, 1872; Nemacheilus longicaudus (Kessler, 1872)

Species of fish

The eastern crested loach (Paracobitis longicauda) is a species of stone loach native to Central Asia. This species grows to a length of 20 centimetres (7.9 in) TL.
