= Oxynoemacheilus shehabi =

Scientific classification
- Kingdom: Animalia
- Phylum: Chordata
- Class: Actinopterygii
- Order: Cypriniformes
- Family: Nemacheilidae
- Genus: Oxynoemacheilus
- Species: O. shehabi

Binomial name
- Oxynoemacheilus shehabi Freyhof & Geiger, 2021)

Species of stone loach

Oxynoemacheilus shehabi is a species of stone loach from the upper Orontes in southern Syria.

The fish is named in honor of Adwan Shehab (1967–2015). Adwan was killed in the streets of Dara’a as a result of the conflict in Syria.
