= Paracobitis persa =

Scientific classification
- Kingdom: Animalia
- Phylum: Chordata
- Class: Actinopterygii
- Order: Cypriniformes
- Family: Nemacheilidae
- Genus: Paracobitis
- Species: P. persa

Binomial name
- Paracobitis persa Freyhof, Esmaeili, Sayyadzadeh & Geiger, 2014

Species of fish

Paracobitis persa is a species of stone loach found in the Mallosjsn spring and Sivand River of the Kor basin in southern Iran. This species reaches a length of 8.1 cm (3.2 in).
