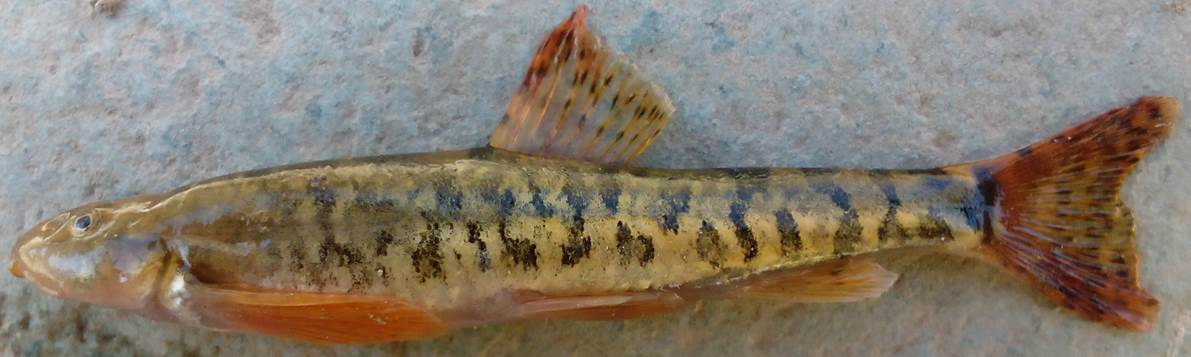
- Oxynoemacheilus bergianus

Scientific classification
- Kingdom: Animalia
- Phylum: Chordata
- Class: Actinopterygii
- Order: Cypriniformes
- Family: Nemacheilidae
- Genus: Oxynoemacheilus; Bănărescu & Nalbant, 1966

Type species
- Cobitis persa Heckel, 1847

Species
- Over 50, see text.

Synonyms
- Ilamnemacheilus Coad & Nalbant, 2005

= Oxynoemacheilus =

Genus of fishes

Oxynoemacheilus is a genus of fish in the family Nemacheilidae found in Europe and Western Asia.

== Species ==
These are the currently recognized species in this genus:

- Oxynoemacheilus afrenatus (Battalgil, 1941)
- Oxynoemacheilus amanos Kaya, Yoğurtçuoğlu & Freyhof, 2021
- Oxynoemacheilus anatolicus Erk'akan, Özeren & Nalbant, 2008
- Oxynoemacheilus angorae (Steindachner, 1897) (Angora loach)
- Oxynoemacheilus araxensis (Bănărescu & Nalbant, 1978)
- Oxynoemacheilus argyrogramma (Heckel, 1847) (Two-spot loach)
- Oxynoemacheilus arsaniasus Freyhof, Kaya, Turan & Geiger, 2019
- Oxynoemacheilus axylos Yoğurtçuoğlu, Kaya & Freyhof, 2022
- Oxynoemacheilus banarescui (Delmastro, 1982)
- Oxynoemacheilus bergi (Gratzianov, 1907)
- Oxynoemacheilus bergianus (Derjavin, 1934)
- Oxynoemacheilus brandtii (Kessler 1877) (Kura loach)
- Oxynoemacheilus bureschi (Drensky, 1928)
- Oxynoemacheilus cemali Turan, Kaya, Kalayci, Bayçelebi & Aksu, 2019
- Oxynoemacheilus ceyhanensis (Erk'akan, Nalbant & Özeren, 2007) (Elbistan loach)
- Oxynoemacheilus chaboras Kaya, Kurtul, Aksu, Oral & Freyhof, 2024
- Oxynoemacheilus chomanicus Kamangar, Prokofiev, Ghaderi & Nalbant, 2014
- Oxynoemacheilus ciceki Sungur, Jalili & Eagderi, 2017
- Oxynoemacheilus cilicicus Kaya, Turan, Bayçelebi, Kalayci & Freyhof, 2020
- Oxynoemacheilus cyri (Berg, 1910)
- Oxynoemacheilus eliasi Yoğurtçuoğlu, Kaya & Freyhof, 2022
- Oxynoemacheilus elsae Eagderi, Jalili & Çiçek, 2018
- Oxynoemacheilus ercisianus (Erk'akan & Kuru, 1986) (Van loach)
- Oxynoemacheilus eregliensis (Bănărescu & Nalbant, 1978)
- Oxynoemacheilus euphraticus (Bănărescu & Nalbant, 1964)
- Oxynoemacheilus evreni (Erk'akan, Nalbant & Özeren, 2007)
- Oxynoemacheilus fatmae Turan, Aksu, Güçlü & Kalayci, 2024
- Oxynoemacheilus fatsaensis Saygun, Ağdamar & Özuluğ, 2021
- Oxynoemacheilus frenatus (Heckel, 1843) (Banded Tigris loach)
- Oxynoemacheilus germencicus (Erk'akan, Nalbant & Özeren, 2007) (Carian loach)
- Oxynoemacheilus gyndes Freyhof & Y. S. Abdullah, 2017
- Oxynoemacheilus hamwii (Krupp & W. Schneider, 1991) (Orontes sportive loach)
- Oxynoemacheilus hanae Freyhof & Y.S. Abdullah, 2017
- Oxynoemacheilus hazarensis Freyhof & Özuluğ, 2017
- Oxynoemacheilus insignis (Heckel, 1843)
- Oxynoemacheilus isauricus Yoğurtçuoğlu, Kaya, Özuluğ & Freyhof, 2021
- Oxynoemacheilus karunensis Freyhof, 2016
- Oxynoemacheilus kaynaki Erk'akan, Özeren & Nalbant, 2008 (Medil loach)
- Oxynoemacheilus kentritensis Freyhof, Kaya & Turan, 2017
- Oxynoemacheilus kiabii Golzarianpour, Abdoli & Freyhof, 2011
- Oxynoemacheilus kottelati Turan, Aksu, Güçlü & Kalayci, 2024
- Oxynoemacheilus kurdistanicus Kamangar, Prokofiev, Ghaderi & Nalbant 2014
- Oxynoemacheilus leontinae (Lortet, 1883)
- Oxynoemacheilus longipinnis (Coad & Nalbant, 2005)
- Oxynoemacheilus marmaraensis Turan, Bayçelebi & Kalayci, 2023
- Oxynoemacheilus marunensis Sayyadzadeh & Esmaeili, 2020
- Oxynoemacheilus mediterraneus (Erk'akan, Nalbant & Özeren, 2007) (Pamphylian loach)
- Oxynoemacheilus melenicus Turan, Aksu & Kalayci, 2023
- Oxynoemacheilus merga (Krynicki, 1840) (Krynicki's loach)
- Oxynoemacheilus muefiti Freyhof, Kaya, Turan & Geiger, 2019
- Oxynoemacheilus namiri (Krupp & Schneider 1991) (Levantine loach)
- Oxynoemacheilus nasreddini Yoğurtçuoğlu, Kaya & Freyhof, 2021
- Oxynoemacheilus oxianus (Kessler, 1877) (Amu-Darya stone loach)
- Oxynoemacheilus panthera (Heckel, 1843) (Tiger loach)
- Oxynoemacheilus parvinae Sayyadzadeh, Eagderi & Esmaeili, 2016
- Oxynoemacheilus paucilepis (Erk'akan, Nalbant & Özeren, 2007)
- Oxynoemacheilus persa (Heckel, 1847)
- Oxynoemacheilus phasicus Freyhof, Kaya, Epitashvili & Geiger ,2021
- Oxynoemacheilus pindus (Economidis, 2005)
- Oxynoemacheilus sakaryaensis Turan, Aksu & Kalayci, 2023
- Oxynoemacheilus samanticus (Bănărescu & Nalbant, 1978) (Kizilirmak sportive loach)
- Oxynoemacheilus sarus Freyhof, Yoğurtçuoğlu & Kaya 2021
- Oxynoemacheilus seyhanensis (Bănărescu, 1968) (Samanti loach)
- Oxynoemacheilus seyhanicola (Erk'akan, Nalbant & Özeren, 2007)
- Oxynoemacheilus shehabi Freyhof & Geiger, 2021
- Oxynoemacheilus simavicus (Balik & Bănărescu, 1978) (Simav loach)
- Oxynoemacheilus theophilii Stoumboudi, Kottelat & Barbieri, 2006
- Oxynoemacheilus tigris (Heckel, 1843) (Tigris loach)
- Oxynoemacheilus tongiorgii (Nalbant & Bianco, 1998)
- Oxynoemacheilus veyselorum Çiçek, Eagderi & Sungur, 2018
- Oxynoemacheilus zagrosensis Kamangar, Prokofiev, Ghaderi & Nalbant, 2014
- Oxynoemacheilus zarzianus Freyhof & Geiger, 2017
