= Paraschistura cristata =

Turkmenian crested loach

Scientific classification
- Domain: Eukaryota
- Kingdom: Animalia
- Phylum: Chordata
- Class: Actinopterygii
- Order: Cypriniformes
- Family: Nemacheilidae
- Genus: Paraschistura
- Species: P. cristata

Binomial name
- Paraschistura cristata (L. S. Berg, 1898)

Synonyms
- Metaschistura cristata Berg, 1898

Species of fish

Paraschistura cristata also known as the Turkmenian crested loach is a species of stone loach found only in freshwater streams of Turkmenistan, Iran and Afghanistan in Central Asia.
