= Oxynoemacheilus namiri =

Conservation status
- Least Concern (IUCN 3.1)

Scientific classification
- Kingdom: Animalia
- Phylum: Chordata
- Class: Actinopterygii
- Order: Cypriniformes
- Family: Nemacheilidae
- Genus: Oxynoemacheilus
- Species: O. namiri

Binomial name
- Oxynoemacheilus namiri (Krupp & W. Schneider, 1991)

Synonyms
- Barbatula namiri (Krupp & Schneider, 1991); Nemacheilus namiri Krupp & Schneider, 1991; Schistura namiri (Krupp & Schneider, 1991)

Species of fish

Oxynoemacheilus namiri, the Levantine loach, is a species of ray-finned fish in the genus Oxynoemacheilus. This species is common and widespread in the drainage system of the Orontes in Turkey and Syria, as well as in coastal streams in Syria south of the border with Lebanon, where it can be found in springs, reservoirs, streams and rivers.
