= Paracobitis hircanica =

Scientific classification
- Domain: Eukaryota
- Kingdom: Animalia
- Phylum: Chordata
- Class: Actinopterygii
- Order: Cypriniformes
- Family: Nemacheilidae
- Genus: Paracobitis
- Species: P. hircanica

Binomial name
- Paracobitis hircanica Mousavi-Sabet, Sayyadzadeh, Esmaeili, Eagderi, Patimar & Freyhof, 2015

Species of stone loach

Paracobitis hircanica, the Hircan crested loach is a species of stone loach is found in tributaries of the Gorgan River, Iran. This species reaches a length of 10.5 cm (4.1 in).
