= Paracobitis salihae =

Scientific classification
- Kingdom: Animalia
- Phylum: Chordata
- Class: Actinopterygii
- Order: Cypriniformes
- Family: Nemacheilidae
- Genus: Paracobitis
- Species: P. salihae

Binomial name
- Paracobitis salihae Kaya, Turan, Kalayci, Bayçelebi & Freyhof, 2020

Species of stone loach

Paracobitis salihae is a species of stone loach found in the Euphrates River.
