= Oxynoemacheilus chomanicus =

Scientific classification
- Domain: Eukaryota
- Kingdom: Animalia
- Phylum: Chordata
- Class: Actinopterygii
- Order: Cypriniformes
- Family: Nemacheilidae
- Genus: Oxynoemacheilus
- Species: O. chomanicus

Binomial name
- Oxynoemacheilus chomanicus Kamangar, Prokofiev, Ghaderi & Nalbant, 2014

Species of fish

Oxynoemacheilus chomanicus is a species of stone loach for the genus Oxynoemacheilus. It is found in Iranian Kurdistan.
