= Paraschistura montana =

Scientific classification
- Kingdom: Animalia
- Phylum: Chordata
- Class: Actinopterygii
- Order: Cypriniformes
- Family: Nemacheilidae
- Genus: Paraschistura
- Species: P. montana

Binomial name
- Paraschistura montana McClelland, 1838

Synonyms
- Schistura montana (McClelland, 1838)

Species of fish

Paraschistura montana is a species of stone loach endemic to Himachal Pradesh, India. It is placed in Schistura by some authorities.
