= Paraschistura prashari =

Conservation status
- Near Threatened (IUCN 3.1)

Scientific classification
- Kingdom: Animalia
- Phylum: Chordata
- Class: Actinopterygii
- Order: Cypriniformes
- Family: Nemacheilidae
- Genus: Paraschistura
- Species: P. prashari

Binomial name
- Paraschistura prashari (Hora, 1933)

Synonyms
- Nemacheilus prashari Hora, 1933 Schistura prashari (Hora, 1933)

Species of fish

Paraschistura prashari is a species of stone loach endemic to Pakistan.
