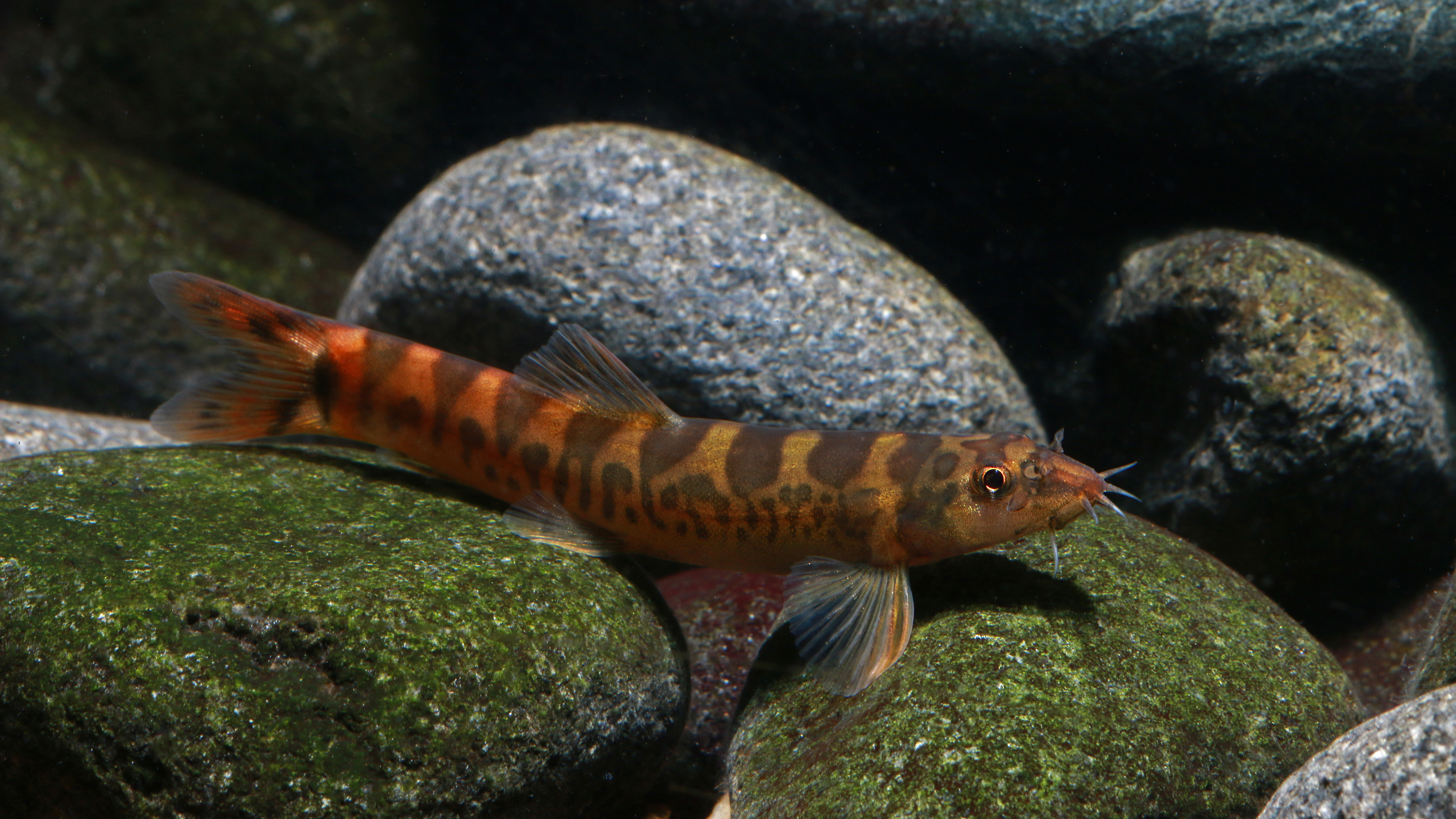

Conservation status
- Endangered (IUCN 3.1)

Scientific classification
- Kingdom: Animalia
- Phylum: Chordata
- Class: Actinopterygii
- Order: Cypriniformes
- Family: Nemacheilidae
- Genus: Mesonoemacheilus
- Species: M. petrubanarescui

Binomial name
- Mesonoemacheilus petrubanarescui (Menon, 1984)

Synonyms
- Nemacheilus petrubanarescui Menon, 1984

= Mesonoemacheilus petrubanarescui =

Species of fish

Mesonoemacheilus petrubanarescui is a species of ray-finned fish from India.

== Etymology ==
The specific name petrubanaescui honours the Romanian ichthyologist Petre Mihai Bănărescu.

== Length ==
It grows to 3.5 cm (1.4 in) standard length.

== Distribution ==
It is endemic to the Western Ghats and is known from only two locations, the Netravati River and Kabani River in Karnataka and Kerala. It is a little known species which is rare and may be threatened by habitat alteration, sand mining and pollution.

== Aquarium ==
It turns up occasionally in the aquarium trade where it is sold as the "dwarf loach".
