= Oxynoemacheilus parvinae =

Scientific classification
- Domain: Eukaryota
- Kingdom: Animalia
- Phylum: Chordata
- Class: Actinopterygii
- Order: Cypriniformes
- Family: Nemacheilidae
- Genus: Oxynoemacheilus
- Species: O. parvinae

Binomial name
- Oxynoemacheilus parvinae Sayyadzadeh, Eagderi & Esmaeili, 2016

Species of fish

Oxynoemacheilus parvinae is a species of stone loach which is endemic to the drainage of the Sirvan River, a tributary of the Tigris in Kermanshah Province of Iran where it prefers reasonable fast flowing, relatively clear water of a gravel substrate. it has not been evaluated for The IUCN Red List of Threatened Species but it may be threatened by drought, water abstraction and pollution. The specific name honours Parvin Etesami, a famous Iranian poet of the 20th century.
