= Oxynoemacheilus panthera =

Conservation status
- Endangered (IUCN 3.1)

Scientific classification
- Kingdom: Animalia
- Phylum: Chordata
- Class: Actinopterygii
- Division: Teleostei
- Order: Cypriniformes
- Family: Nemacheilidae
- Genus: Oxynoemacheilus
- Species: O. panthera

Binomial name
- Oxynoemacheilus panthera (Heckel, 1843)

Synonyms
- Cobitis panthera Heckel, 1843; Barbatula panthera (Heckel, 1843); Noemacheilus panthera (Heckel, 1843); Orthrias panthera (Heckel, 1843); Cobitis leopardus Heckel, 1843

Species of fish

Oxynoemacheilus panthera, the tiger loach or the Damascus loach, is a species of ray-finned fish in the genus Oxynoemacheilus. It occurs in only two streams, the Nahr Baradá and Nahr al-A'waj in the Damascus basin in Syria. It is thought that over 90% of the populations of this species of stone loach have been lost due to water abstraction and the drying up of its native watercourses, exacerbated by lower rainfall levels.
