= Oxynoemacheilus kurdistanicus =

Scientific classification
- Domain: Eukaryota
- Kingdom: Animalia
- Phylum: Chordata
- Class: Actinopterygii
- Order: Cypriniformes
- Family: Nemacheilidae
- Genus: Oxynoemacheilus
- Species: O. kurdistanicus

Binomial name
- Oxynoemacheilus kurdistanicus Kamangar, Prokofiev, Ghaderi & Nalbant, 2014

Species of fish

Oxynoemacheilus kurdistanicus is a species of stone loach which is endemic to the Choman River in Iranian Kurdistan. They grow up to 6.9 cm or 2.71 inches in length. They are vertebrates with soft rays. This type of species are harmless to humans.

== Environment ==
Oxynoemacheilus kurdistanicus live in freshwater. They also live in a demersal climate and subtropical range.
