= Oxynoemacheilus pindus =

Conservation status
- Near Threatened (IUCN 3.1)

Scientific classification
- Kingdom: Animalia
- Phylum: Chordata
- Class: Actinopterygii
- Order: Cypriniformes
- Family: Nemacheilidae
- Genus: Oxynoemacheilus
- Species: O. pindus

Binomial name
- Oxynoemacheilus pindus (Economidis, 2005)

Synonyms
- Barbatula pindus Economidis, 2005

Species of fish

Oxynoemacheilus pindus is a species of Cypriniformes fish in the stone loach family (Nemacheilidae).

It is found in Greece and Albania. Its natural habitat is rivers. It is threatened by habitat loss and change caused by water extraction, pollution, and agriculture.
