= Oxynoemacheilus argyrogramma =

Conservation status
- Least Concern (IUCN 3.1)

Scientific classification
- Kingdom: Animalia
- Phylum: Chordata
- Class: Actinopterygii
- Division: Teleostei
- Order: Cypriniformes
- Family: Nemacheilidae
- Genus: Oxynoemacheilus
- Species: O. argyrogramma

Binomial name
- Oxynoemacheilus argyrogramma (Heckel, 1847)

Synonyms
- Cobitis argyrogramma Heckel, 1847; Barbatula euphratica (Banarescu & Nalbant, 1964); Orthrias euphraticus (Banarescu & Nalbant, 1964); Barbatula tschaiyssuensis (Banarescu & Nalbant, 1964); Nemacheilus tschaiyssuensis Banarescu & Nalbant, 1964; Orthrias tschaiyssuensis (Banarescu & Nalbant, 1964); Oxynoemacheilus tschaiyssuensis (Banarescu & Nalbant, 1964)

Species of fish

Oxynoemacheilus argyrogramma, the two-spot loach is a species of ray-finned fish in the genus Oxynoemacheilus.

It is found in the drainage of the Queiq River in Syria and Turkey, the upper Euphrates drainage in Turkey, and possibly in the drainage in Syria and Iraq. Almost extirpated from the Queiq (as this river has virtually dried out), it remains abundant in the Euphrates.

This species can be found in a wide range of habitats where there is a moderately fast current from small upland streams to banks of large rivers. It can also live in stagnant water bodies and reservoirs. It is threatened by water abstraction, lowering rainfall due to climate change, and the construction of dams. Economic development in its habitat exacerbates these threats.

Freyhof and Özuluǧ argued in a 2017 paper that Oxynoemacheilus euphraticus was a distinct species and not a synonym of O. argyrogramma.

== Footnotes ==
- Froese, Rainer; Pauly, Daniel (eds.). "Barbatula euphratica". FishBase.
