= Paracobitis atrakensis =

Scientific classification
- Domain: Eukaryota
- Kingdom: Animalia
- Phylum: Chordata
- Class: Actinopterygii
- Order: Cypriniformes
- Family: Nemacheilidae
- Genus: Paracobitis
- Species: P. atrakensis

Binomial name
- Paracobitis atrakensis Esmaeili, Mousavi-Sabet, Sayyadzadeh, Vatandoust & Freyhof, 2014

Synonyms
- Cobitis boutanensis (McClelland, 1842)

Species of stone loach

Paracobitis atrakensis is a species of stone loach, found in the Atrek and Bidvaz rivers drainage areas in northeastern Iran. This species reaches a length of 5 cm (2.0 in).
