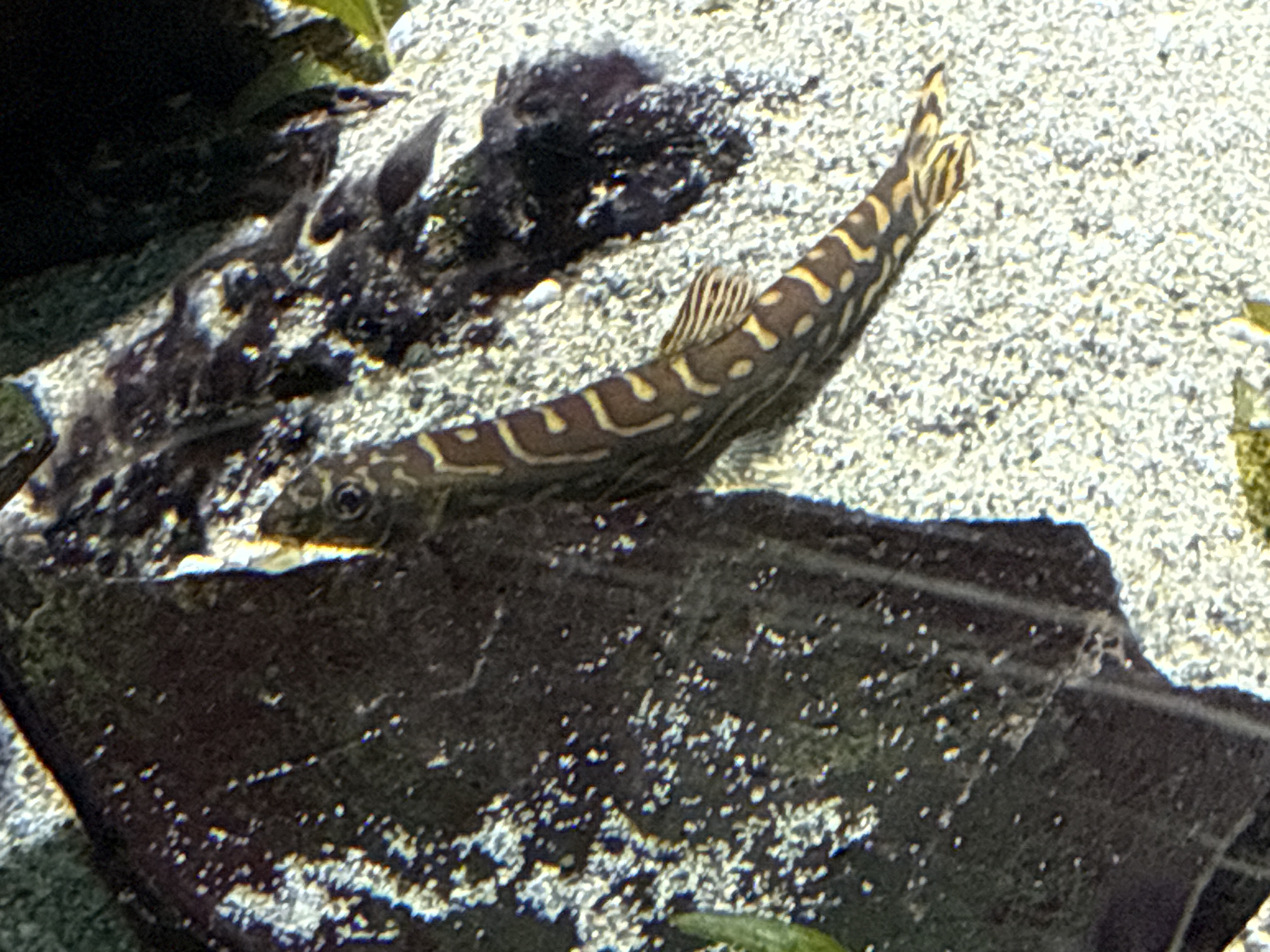
- At the Vancouver Aquarium
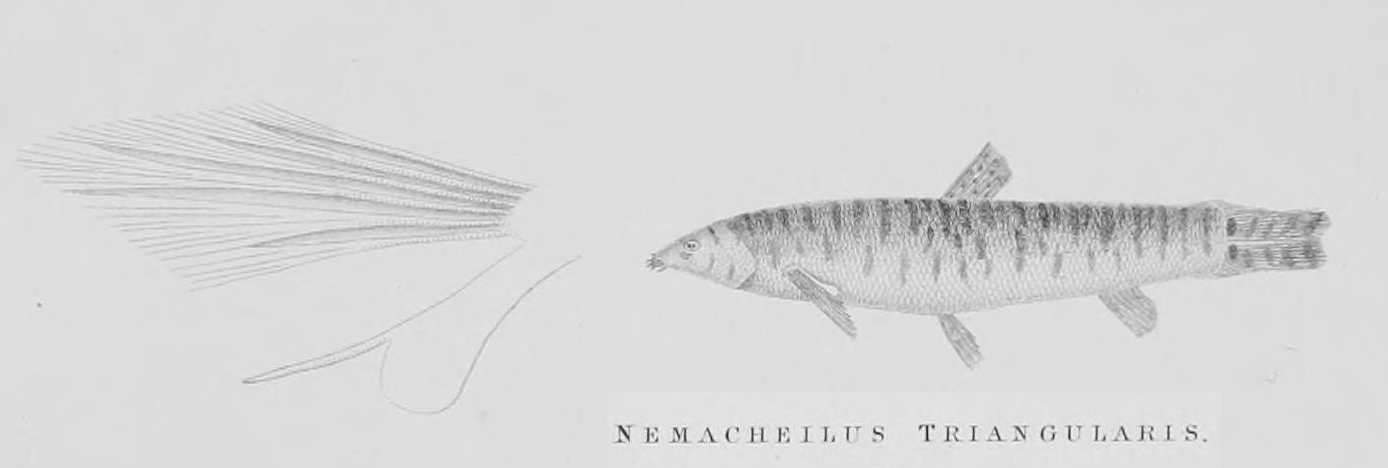
- 1865 illustration

Conservation status
- Least Concern (IUCN 3.1)

Scientific classification
- Kingdom: Animalia
- Phylum: Chordata
- Class: Actinopterygii
- Order: Cypriniformes
- Family: Nemacheilidae
- Genus: Mesonoemacheilus
- Species: M. triangularis

Binomial name
- Mesonoemacheilus triangularis F. Day, 1865

Synonyms
- Nemacheilus triangularis (F. Day, 1865)

= Mesonoemacheilus triangularis =

Species of fish

Mesonoemacheilus triangularis is a species of stone loach endemic to the Western Ghats in southern Karnataka, Kerala, and Tamil Nadu, India. It is a fairly common species occurring in streams with gravel, cobbles and bedrock with some sand as the substrate. This fish grows to a length of 5.8 centimetres (2.3 in) SL and can be found in the aquarium trade.
