= Oxynoemacheilus bureschi =

Conservation status
- Least Concern (IUCN 3.1)

Scientific classification
- Kingdom: Animalia
- Phylum: Chordata
- Class: Actinopterygii
- Order: Cypriniformes
- Family: Nemacheilidae
- Genus: Oxynoemacheilus
- Species: O. bureschi

Binomial name
- Oxynoemacheilus bureschi (Drensky, 1928)

Synonyms
- Nemacheilus bureschi Drensky, 1928; Barbatula bureschi (Drensky, 1928)

Species of fish

Oxynoemacheilus bureschi, the Struma stone loach, is a species of ray-finned fish in the stone loach family (Nemacheilidae). It is found in the Struma, Vardar and Nestos river basins Bulgaria, Greece, North Macedonia, and Serbia Its natural habitat is rivers, preferring larger streams with fast currents, especially in the middle. It cannot survive where the rivers have been canalised and it is threatened by habitat loss. The specific name honours the Bulgarian ichthyologist Ivan Buresh, who was able to influence the Bulgarian monarch Boris III to allow Drensky to collect specimens in Bulgaria.

Oxynoemacheilus bureschi is nocturnal and feeds on benthic invertebrates, particularly worms and insect larvae. The breeding season runs from May to July and the spawning takes place among stones, gravels and plants in shallow running water. The fish are sexually mature once they have attained a length of 5 cm (2.0 in).
