= Paracobitis basharensis =

Scientific classification
- Domain: Eukaryota
- Kingdom: Animalia
- Phylum: Chordata
- Class: Actinopterygii
- Order: Cypriniformes
- Family: Nemacheilidae
- Genus: Paracobitis
- Species: P. basharensis

Binomial name
- Paracobitis basharensis Freyhof, Esmaeili, Sayyadzadeh & Geiger, 2014

Species of fish

Paracobitis basharensis is a species of stone loach Found in the Bashar River, Karoun drainage in Iran. This species reaches a length of 6.1 cm (2.4 in).
