= Paraschistura bampurensis =

Conservation status
- Least Concern (IUCN 3.1)

Scientific classification
- Kingdom: Animalia
- Phylum: Chordata
- Class: Actinopterygii
- Order: Cypriniformes
- Family: Nemacheilidae
- Genus: Paraschistura
- Species: P. bampurensis

Binomial name
- Paraschistura bampurensis (A. M. Nikolskii, 1900)

Synonyms
- Nemacheilus bampurensis Nikolskii, 1900; Paraschistura baluchiorum (Zugmayer, 1912); Schistura baluchiorum Zugmayer, 1912

Species of fish

Paraschistura bampurensis, the Bampur loach, is a species of stone loach that is found in Southern Iran and Pakistan, along the Persian Gulf and Gulf of Oman. Its common name refers to the Bampur River.
