= Amu-Darya stone loach =

Scientific classification
- Kingdom: Animalia
- Phylum: Chordata
- Class: Actinopterygii
- Order: Cypriniformes
- Family: Nemacheilidae
- Genus: Nemacheilus
- Species: N. oxianus

Binomial name
- Nemacheilus oxianus Kessler, 1877

Synonyms
- Noemacheilus oxianus (Kessler, 1877); Oxynoemacheilus oxianus (Kessler, 1877)

Species of fish

The Amu-Darya stone loach (Nemacheilus oxianus) is a species of ray-finned fish in the genus Nemacheilus, although it is sometimes placed in the genus Oxynoemacheilus.

== Footnotes ==
- Froese, Rainer; Pauly, Daniel (eds.). "Nemacheilus oxianus". FishBase.
