= Paracobitis zabgawraensis =

Scientific classification
- Kingdom: Animalia
- Phylum: Chordata
- Class: Actinopterygii
- Order: Cypriniformes
- Family: Nemacheilidae
- Genus: Paracobitis
- Species: P. zabgawraensis

Binomial name
- Paracobitis zabgawraensis Freyhof, Esmaeili, Sayyadzadeh & Geiger, 2014

Synonyms
- Cobitis boutanensis McClelland, 1842

Species of fish

Paracobitis zabgawraensis is a species of stone loach found in the Great Zab River in Iraqi Kurdistan and Habour in Turkey. This species reaches a length of 7.4 cm (2.9 in).
