= Paracobitis molavii =

Scientific classification
- Kingdom: Animalia
- Phylum: Chordata
- Class: Actinopterygii
- Order: Cypriniformes
- Family: Nemacheilidae
- Genus: Paracobitis
- Species: P. molavii

Binomial name
- Paracobitis molavii Freyhof, Esmaeili, Sayyadzadeh & Geiger, 2014

Species of fish

Paracobitis molavii is a species of stone loach found in the Little Zab River in Iran and upper Sirwan (Kurdish) drainage [Sirvan (Persian) or Diyala (Arabic)] in Iran and Iraq. This species reaches a length of 7.3 cm (2.9 in).

It is named after Sufi mystic and poet Rumi, commonly known as Molavi in Iran.
