= Paracobitis rhadinaea =

Scientific classification
- Domain: Eukaryota
- Kingdom: Animalia
- Phylum: Chordata
- Class: Actinopterygii
- Order: Cypriniformes
- Family: Nemacheilidae
- Genus: Paracobitis
- Species: P. rhadinaea

Binomial name
- Paracobitis rhadinaea (Regan, 1906)

Synonyms
- Nemachilus rhadinaeus Regan, 1906; Paracobitis rhadinaeus (Regan, 1906); Paracobitis rhadinea (Regan, 1906); Paracobitis rhadineus (Regan, 1906); Nemachilus macmahoni Chaudhuri, 1910

Species of loach

Paracobitis rhadinaea, or the Easted crested loach, is a species of stone loach the Sistan basin of Iran and Helmand River in Afghanistan. This species reaches a length of 23.6 cm (9.3 in). It is known from minor morphological differences between specimens.
