= Oxynoemacheilus merga =

Conservation status
- Least Concern (IUCN 3.1)

Scientific classification
- Kingdom: Animalia
- Phylum: Chordata
- Class: Actinopterygii
- Order: Cypriniformes
- Family: Nemacheilidae
- Genus: Oxynoemacheilus
- Species: O. merga

Binomial name
- Oxynoemacheilus merga (Krynicki, 1840)

Synonyms
- Cobitis merga Krynicki, 1840; Barbatula merga (Krynicki, 1840); Nemacheilus merga (Krynicki, 1840)

Species of fish

Oxynoemacheilus merga, Krynicki's loach, is a species of stone loach from the genus Oxynoemacheilus. This species reaches a length of 10 cm (3.9 in). It is found in the western drainage basin of the Caspian Sea in eastern Europe in the upper mountain streams of the drainage systems of the Kuma, Terek, Sulak, Shura-ozen and Samur where it is abundant. The countries in which it occurs are Azerbaijan, Georgia and Russia.
