= Oxynoemacheilus cyri =

Conservation status
- Least Concern (IUCN 3.1)

Scientific classification
- Kingdom: Animalia
- Phylum: Chordata
- Class: Actinopterygii
- Order: Cypriniformes
- Family: Nemacheilidae
- Genus: Oxynoemacheilus
- Species: O. cyri

Binomial name
- Oxynoemacheilus cyri (Berg, 1910)

Synonyms
- Nemacheilus tigris cyri Berg, 1910

Species of fish

Oxynoemacheilus cyri, the Göle loach or banded Kura loach, is a species of stone loach from the genus Oxynoemacheilus. It is endemic to the Kura drainage in northern Turkey where it is currently locally abundant. This species occurs in high mountain streams with fast flowing currents. The specific name derives from the classical name for the Kura, "Cyrus".
