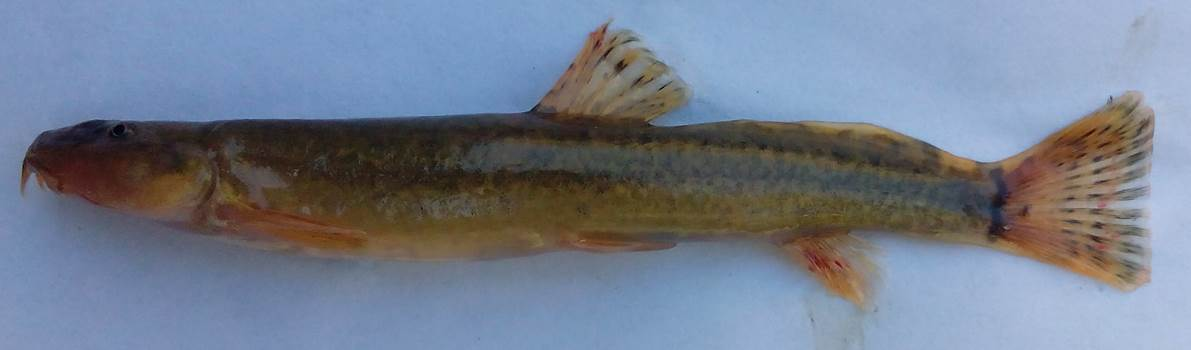

Scientific classification
- Domain: Eukaryota
- Kingdom: Animalia
- Phylum: Chordata
- Class: Actinopterygii
- Order: Cypriniformes
- Family: Nemacheilidae
- Genus: Paracobitis
- Species: P. malapterura

Binomial name
- Paracobitis malapterura Valenciennes, 1846

Synonyms
- Cobitis malapterura Valenciennes, 1846; Nemacheilus malapterurus (Valenciennes, 1846); Nemacheilus malapterurus malapterurus (Valenciennes, 1846); Nemachilus malapterurus (Valenciennes, 1846); Paracobitis malapterurus (Valenciennes, 1846); Paracobitis iranica Nalbant & Bianco, 1998

= Paracobitis malapterura =

Species of stone loach

The Western crested loach, Paracobitis malapterura is a species of stone loach endemic to the Tigris–Euphrates river system. This species reaches a length of 12.6 cm (5.0 in).
