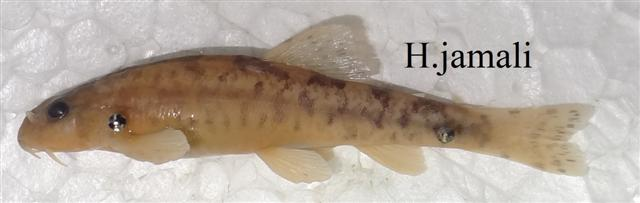

Conservation status
- Critically Endangered (IUCN 3.1)

Scientific classification
- Kingdom: Animalia
- Phylum: Chordata
- Class: Actinopterygii
- Order: Cypriniformes
- Family: Nemacheilidae
- Genus: Oxynoemacheilus
- Species: O. tigris

Binomial name
- Oxynoemacheilus tigris (Heckel, 1843)

Synonyms
- Cobitis tigris Heckel, 1843; Barbatula tigris (Heckel, 1843); Nemacheilus tigris (Heckel, 1843); Noemacheilus tigris (Heckel, 1843); Orthrias tigris (Heckel, 1843); Paracobitis tigris (Heckel, 1843)

= Oxynoemacheilus tigris =

Species of fish

Oxynoemacheilus tigris, the Tigris loach or Halap loach, is a species of stone loach from the genus Oxynoemacheilus. It can be distinguished from other loaches in the genus by its long and high dorsal crest with a whitish margin. This critically endangered species is endemic to the Queiq River in Turkey where it occurs ins a short stretch of stream between two reservoirs. It formerly occurred in Syria but it is locally extinct from the Syrian portion of the Queiq. This species is threatened by water abstraction and the increased frequency of droughts caused by climate change, most of the Queiq has already been desiccated. It is, however, abundant in the area it is known from where it can be found in reaches of gravel or mud substrate with moderately fast flowing to near standing water.

== Physical Description ==
the species possesses a long, high dorsal crest with a whitish margin that extends through the anal-fin origin. The body has 10-16 bold, narrow, regularly shaped bars that are especially distinct on the caudal peduncle. Most individuals possess two bold black spots at the caudal fin base. The flank has several isolated, deeply embedded scales, and the body cross-section is compressed.

== Taxonomy ==
Oxynoemacheilus tigris is a stone loach of the family Nemacheilidae, described by Johann Jakob Heckel in 1843. Molecular data shows that individuals from the Queiq drainage possess mitochondrial haplotypes nested within O. namiri, this pattern is currently understood as a result of introgressive hybridization between the two species. O.tigris is supported as a distinct species based on morphology and nuclear-level evidence, along with DNA barcoding to separate it from other fish including O. kaynaki and O.namiri.

== Range ==
The Oxynoemacheilus tigris is located in the freshwater streams in the Tigris and Euphrates drainages, which is located in Turkey, Syria, Iran, and Iraq. These basins provide wide variety of aquatic environments from fast moving currents of the main rivers to slow moving headwater streams the Oxynoemacheilus tigris is a very adaptable species that can live in the most water conditions. Has recently lost majority of habitat due to limited geographic range making it a very vulnerable species. Loss of habitat has been caused mainly by climate change, with rivers drying up and human-caused extraction of water from these systems. Is now considered extinct in its reaches in Syria, Iran, and Iraq and is now only found in Queiq river in Turkey.

== Life Cycle ==
Oxynoemacheilus tigris like most stone loaches live a short lifespan ranging from 3-5 years. O.tigris is considered oviparous which reproduce through laying eggs. Which the females lay eggs in the gravel and sandy bottom. After hatching in there larval stage they rely on their egg sac as their source of food before they transition into being a juvenile where they can start feeding on small invertebrates as they become stronger swimmers. Once they reach adult stage where they can handle stronger currents they can feed on more variety on invertebrates. Then they annually reproduce repeating the cycle.

== Feeding ==
Oxynoemacheilus tigris feeding is like all other stone loach species which primarily feed on aquatic invertebrates including chironomids and other insect larvae on the river bottom using their barbels around their mouth to locate their prey. As well they are mainly a nocturnal feeder where they feed only at night.

== Conservation ==
The International Union for Conservation of Nature has listed the Oxynoemacheilus tigris as critically endangered. The last assessment on the species was back in 2013 and since then there range has shrank even more and lead to the population to stay in decline. This has been due to climate change as well as water extraction which is leading to the Queiq river the last known river system with the Oxynoemacheilus tigris to dry out. There are no conservation efforts being made due to the extreme nature of the range of the species the likelihood of the drainage drying out will occur before conservation efforts could happen.
