= Paraschistura naseeri =

Conservation status
- Endangered (IUCN 3.1)

Scientific classification
- Kingdom: Animalia
- Phylum: Chordata
- Class: Actinopterygii
- Order: Cypriniformes
- Family: Nemacheilidae
- Genus: Paraschistura
- Species: P. naseeri

Binomial name
- Paraschistura naseeri (N. ud-D. Ahmad & Mirza, 1963)

Synonyms
- Nemacheilus punjabensis naseeri Ahmad & Mirza, 1963; Schistura naseeri (Ahmad & Mirza, 1963)

Species of fish

Paraschistura naseeri is a species of stone loach endemic to Khyber Pakhtunkhwa province of Pakistan.
