= Hazar bleak =

Conservation status
- Least Concern (IUCN 3.1)

Scientific classification
- Kingdom: Animalia
- Phylum: Chordata
- Class: Actinopterygii
- Order: Cypriniformes
- Family: Leuciscidae
- Subfamily: Leuciscinae
- Genus: Alburnus
- Species: A. heckeli

Binomial name
- Alburnus heckeli Battalgil, 1943

Species of fish

The Hazar bleak (Alburnus heckeli) is a species of ray-finned fish in the family Cyprinidae. It is endemic to Lake Hazar in Turkey.
