= Paraschistura punjabensis =

Conservation status
- Vulnerable (IUCN 3.1)

Scientific classification
- Kingdom: Animalia
- Phylum: Chordata
- Class: Actinopterygii
- Order: Cypriniformes
- Family: Nemacheilidae
- Genus: Paraschistura
- Species: P. punjabensis

Binomial name
- Paraschistura punjabensis (Hora, 1923)

Synonyms
- Nemachilus punjabensis Hora, 1923; Schistura punjabensis (Hora, 1923)

Species of fish

Paraschistura punjabensis is a species of ray-finned fish in the genus Paraschistura. It is endemic to cold hillstreams of the Salt Range in Punjab, Pakistan.
