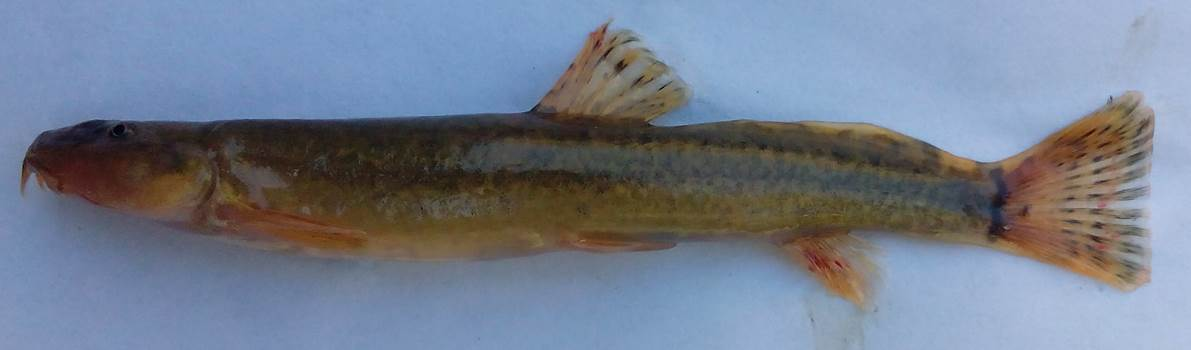
- Paracobitis malapterura

Scientific classification
- Kingdom: Animalia
- Phylum: Chordata
- Class: Actinopterygii
- Division: Teleostei
- Order: Cypriniformes
- Family: Nemacheilidae
- Genus: Paracobitis; Bleeker, 1863

Type species
- Cobitis malapterura (Valenciennes, 1846)

Species
- about 16, see text

Synonyms
- Adiposia Annandale & Hora, 1920; Pseudodon Kessler, 1874; Troglocobitis Parin, 1983

= Paracobitis =

Genus of fishes

Paracobitis is a genus of Asian stone loaches.

== Species ==
Paracobitis currently contains the following recognised species:

- Paracobitis abrishamchiani Mousavi-Sabet, Vatandoust, Geiger & Freyhof, 2019
- Paracobitis atrakensis Esmaeili, Mousavi-Sabet, Sayyadzadeh, Vatandoust & Freyhof, 2014 (Atrak crested loach)
- Paracobitis basharensis Freyhof, Esmaeili, Sayyadzadeh & Geiger, 2014
- Paracobitis ghazniensis (Bănărescu & Nalbant, 1966)
- Paracobitis hircanica Mousavi-Sabet, Sayyadzadeh, Esmaeili, Eagderi, Patimar & Freyhof, 2015 (Hircan crested loach)
- Paracobitis longicauda (Kessler, 1872) (Eastern crested loach)
- Paracobitis malapterura (Valenciennes, 1846) (Western crested loach)
- Paracobitis molavii Freyhof, Esmaeili, Sayyadzadeh & Geiger, 2014
- Paracobitis persa Freyhof, Esmaeili, Sayyadzadeh & Geiger, 2014.
- Paracobitis rhadinaea (Regan, 1906)
- Paracobitis salihae Kaya, Turan, Kalayci, Bayçelebi & Freyhof, 2020
- Paracobitis starostini (Parin, 1983)
- Paracobitis zabgawraensis Freyhof, Esmaeili, Sayyadzadeh & Geiger, 2014
