= Petre Mihai Bănărescu =

Romanian ichthyologist

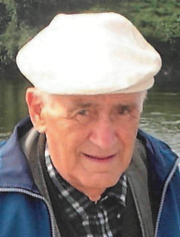
Petre Mihai Bănărescu, Romanian ichthyologist (1921–2009)

Petre Mihai Bănărescu (born 15 September 1921 in Craiova, Dolj County – died 12 May 2009 in Bucharest) was a Romanian ichthyologist. Bănărescu was a member of the Romanian Academy.

Bănărescu published around 300 papers in scholarly journals. In 1975 he was elected an honorary member of the American Society of Ichthyologists and Herpetologists and an honorary member of the European Society of Ichtyologists in 1988.

== Education ==
- In 1932–1940 attended the C.D. Loga college in Timișoara, where he was taught by ornithologist Dionisie Lintia (natural sciences) and by the micro paleontologist Teodor Iorgulescu (geology, botany and zoology).
- 1940–1944, the Student of the Faculty of Sciences (Department of Natural Sciences) at the University of Cluj, where in 1949, he had his PhD thesis Research on the telestones encephalus related to the life and phylogeny.
- In 1962 he received the Doctor of Science Degree.

== Fish described ==
Oxynoemacheilus araxensis

Ancherythroculter daovantieni

- Category:Taxa named by Petre Mihai Bănărescu

== Tribute ==
Squalidus banarescui I. S. Chen & Y. C. Chang 2007 was named in honor of Bănărescu, Institute of Biology, Bucharest, for his "great" contributions to Taiwanese cyprinid taxonomy, especially the subfamily Gobioninae, between 1960 and 1973.

Mesonoemacheilus petrubanarescui (Menon, 1984) was named in his honor.
