= Teodor T. Nalbant =

Romanian ichthyologist

Teodor T. Nalbant (December 18, 1933 – November 12, 2011) was a Romanian ichthyologist.

Born in Constanţa, near the Black Sea, Nalbant spent some of his childhood among fishermen in the Danube Delta. After finishing high school, he studied biology, first in Cluj, and then at the University of Bucharest. While in Cluj, Nalbant befriended Petre Mihai Bănărescu, who would become a collaborator on many publications. Nalbant published over 150 papers on a variety of subjects in and related to his field. He worked at the Grigore Antipa National Museum of Natural History and participated in numerous expeditions to regions of the Atlantic, Indian and Pacific Oceans.

== Tribute ==
Taxa named for Nalbant include genus Nalbantichtys (Schultz, 1967), subgenus Nalbantius (Mauge and Bauchot, 1984) and species Schistura nalbanti (Mîrza and Bănărescu, 1979) and Cyclaspis nalbanti (Petrescu, 1998).

== See also ==
- Category:Taxa named by Teodor T. Nalbant
