= List of freshwater fishes of Greece =

The following is a list of the freshwater fish species of Greece. The list includes all the known species, with their valid scientific names, their official common Greek names and any sub-species.

== Petromyzontidae ==
Taxonomy	Common name	Sub-species
Petromyzon marinus	Petromyzon	none
Eudontomyzon hellenicus	Gavohelo	none

== Acipenseridae ==
Taxonomy	Common name	Sub-species
Huso huso	Mourouna	none
Acipenser naccarii	Xyryhi Adriatikis	none
Acipenser sturio	Xyryhi	none
Acipenser stellatus	Astroxyryhi	none

== Clupeidae ==
Taxonomy	Common name	Sub-species
Alosa fallax	Sardelomana	A. f. nilotica
Alosa macedonica	Liparia	none
Alosa vistonica	Thritsa	none

== Salmonidae ==
Taxonomy	Common name	Sub-species
Salmo trutta	Pestrofa	Salmo dentex, Salmo macrostigma, Salmo pelagonicus, Salmo peristericus, Salmo macedonicus
Oncorhynchus mykiss	Amerikaniki pestrofa	none
Oncorhynchus kisutch	Solomos koho	none
Salvelinus fontinalis	Salvelinos	none
Coregonus lavaretus	Korigonos	none

== Esocidae ==
Taxonomy	Common name	Sub-species
Esox lucius	Tourna	none

== Cyprinidae ==
Taxonomy	Common name	Sub-species
Rutilus rutilus	Tsironi	Rutilus mariza, Rutilus doiranensis, Rutilus vegariticus
Rutilus ohridanus	Platika	Rutilus prespensis
Rutilus ylikiensis	Dromitsa, Hirokova	none
Pachychilon macedonicum (Rutilus macedonicum)	Mavrotsironi	none
Pachychilon pictum	Hilas	none
Pelasgus stymphalicus	Daska	Pelasgus marathonicus, Pelasgus thesproticus, Pelasgus minutus
Pseudophoxinus beoticus	Paskoviza	none
Phoxinellus pleurobipunctatus	Liara	none
Pelasgus epiroticus	Tsima	Pelasgus prespensis,
Tropidophoxinellus hellenicus	Gournara	none
Tropidophoxinellus spartiaticus	Bafa	none
Ladigesocypris ghigii	Ghizani	L. g. ghigii
Leucaspius delineatus	Microsirko	none
Squalius cii	Tylinari	Squalius albus, Squalius peloponnensis, Squalius vardarensis, Squalius macedonicus
Squalius svallize	Drossina	none
Leuciscus borysthenicus	Tsailaki	none
Leuciscus keadicus	Menida	none
Phoxinus phoxinus	Kokkinogastros	none
Scardinius erythrophthalmus	Kokkinoftera	none
Scardinius acarnanicus	Tseroukia	none
Scardinius graecus	Kalamithra	none
Aspius aspius	Asprogrivado	none
Tinca tinca	Glini	none
Chondrostoma prespense	Skoumbouzi	none
Chondrostoma vardarense	Gourounomitis	none
Gobio gobio	Ghyftopsaro	Gobio bulgaricus, Gobio balcanicus, Gobio feraeensis
Gobio kessleri	Mylonaki	Gobio banarescui
Gobio uranoscopus	Moustakas	Gobio elimeius
Pseudorasbora parva	Pseftorasbora	none
Barbus barbus	Moustakato	Barbus macedonicus, Barbus thessalus
Barbus albanicus	Strossidi	none
Barbus graecus	Skarouni	none
Barbus prespensis	Briana	none
Barbus cyclolepis	Virjana	Barbus cyclolepis, Barbus strumicae, Barbus sperchiensis, Barbus cholorematicus
Barbus euboicus	Petropsaro	none
Barbus peloponnesius	Hamossourtis	Barbus peloponnesius, Barbus rebeli, Barbus petenyi
Alburnus alburnus	Sirko	Alburnus macedonicus, Alburnus thessalicus, Alburnus stroumicae
Chalcalburnus chalcoides	Ghelartza	Chalcalburnus macedonicus
Chalcalburnus belvica	Belovitsa	none
Alburnoides bipunctatus	Tsironaki	Alburnoides ohridanus, Alburnoides thessalicus, Alburnoides strymonicus
Abramis brama	Lestia	none
Vimba melanops	Malamida	none
Rhodeus sericeus	Mourmouritsa	Rhodeus amarus
Carassius carassius	Koutsouras	none
Carassius auratus	Petalouda	Carassius gibelio
Cyprinus carpio	Grivadi, Cyprinos	none
Hypophthalmichthys molitrix	Assimocyprinos	none
Ctenopharyngodon idella	Hortofagos Cyprinos	none
Aristichthys nobilis	Marmarokyprinos	none
Parabramis pekinensis	Kineziki Lestia	

== Cobitidae ==
Taxonomy	Common name	Sub-species
Barbatula barbatula	Vinos	O. b. vardarensis
Orthrias brandti	Pterohili	O. b. bureschi
Oxynoemacheilus pindus	Pindovinos	none
Cobitis vardarensis	Velonitsa	none
Cobitis stephanidisi	Ferovelonitsa	none
Cobitis strumicae	Thrakovelonitsa	none
Cobitis punctilineata	Grammovelonitsa	none
Cobitis trichonica	Trichonovelonitsa	none
Cobitis hellenica	Lourovelonitsa	C. h. arahthosensis
Cobitis meridionalis	Vrygovelonitsa	none
Sabanejewia aurata	Hryssovelonitsa	S. a. balcanica

== Siluridae ==
Taxonomy	Common name	Sub-species
Silurus glanis	Goulianos	none
Silurus aristotelis	Glanidi	none

== Anguillidae ==
Taxonomy	Common name	Sub-species
Anguilla anguilla	Heli	none

== Gasterosteidae ==
Taxonomy	Common name	Sub-species
Gasterosteus aculeatus	Agathero	none
Pungitius platygaster	Pontopygosteos	none
Pungitius hellenicus	Ellinopygosteos	none

== Syngnathidae ==
Taxonomy	Common name	Sub-species
Syngnathus abaster	Sakorafa	none

== Cyprinodontidae ==
Taxonomy	Common name	Sub-species
Aphanius fasciatus	Zaharias	none
Valencia letourneuxi	Zournas	none

== Poecilidae ==
Taxonomy	Common name	Sub-species
Gambusia affinis	Kounoupopsaro	none

== Mugilidae ==
Taxonomy	Common name	Sub-species
Mugil cephalus	Kephalos	none
Liza aurata	Myzinari	none
Liza saliens	Gastros, Kefalas	none
Liza ramada	Mavraki, Lafkinos	none
Oedalechilus labeo	Grentzos	none
Chelon labrosus	Velanitsa, Platarida	none

== Atherinidae ==
Taxonomy	Common name	Sub-species
Atherina boyeri	Atherina	none
Atherina hepsetus	Souvlitis	none

== Serranidae ==
Taxonomy	Common name	Sub-species
Dicentrarchus labrax	Lavraki	none
Dicentrarchus punctatus	Stiktolavraki	none

== Percidae ==
Taxonomy	Common name	Sub-species
Perca fluviatilis	Perki	none
Stizostedion lucioperca	Potamolavrako	none
Zingel streber	Potamoloutsos	Zingel balcanicus

== Centrarchidae ==
Taxonomy	Common name	Sub-species
Lepomis gibbosus	Iliopsaro	none

== Blenniidae ==
Taxonomy	Common name	Sub-species
Salaria fluviatilis	Potamosaliara	none

== Gobiidae ==
Taxonomy	Common name	Sub-species
Knipowitschia caucasica	Pontogovios	none
Knipowitschia thessala	Thessalogovios	none
Knipowitschia milleri	Aheronogovios	none
Knipowitschia panizzae	Evinogovios	none
Economidichthys pygmaeus	Lourogovios	none
Economidichthys trichonis	Nanogovios	none
Proterorhinus semilunaris	Rinogovios	none
Zosterisessor ophiocephalus	Prassinogovios	none

== Pleuronectidae ==
Taxonomy	Common name	Sub-species
Platichthys flesus	Fassi	P. f. luscus
