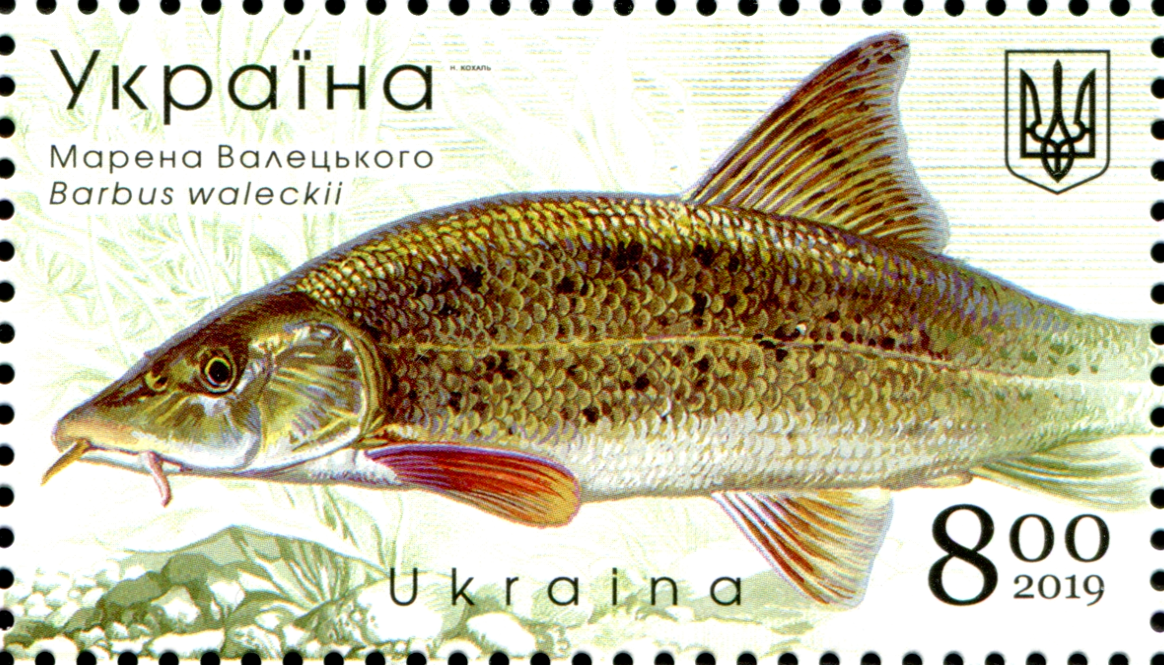

Conservation status
- Least Concern (IUCN 3.1)

Scientific classification
- Domain: Eukaryota
- Kingdom: Animalia
- Phylum: Chordata
- Class: Actinopterygii
- Order: Cypriniformes
- Family: Cyprinidae
- Subfamily: Barbinae
- Genus: Barbus
- Species: B. waleckii

Binomial name
- Barbus waleckii Rolik, 1970

= Vistula barbel =

Species of fish

The Vistula barbel (Barbus waleckii) is a disputed species of European freshwater fish in the cyprinid genus Barbus.

It is often included in B. cyclolepis. More recently, it has been hypothesized to be a natural hybrid that originated from a common barbel (B. barbus) female mating with a Carpathian barbel (B. carpathicus) male. Nevertheless, the populations do not seem to represent first-generation hybrids. It is recorded or suspected from Poland, Slovakia and Ukraine.

== Footnotes ==
- Froese, Rainer; Pauly, Daniel (eds.). "Barbus waleckii". FishBase.
- Barbus waleckii IUCN Red List v. 3.1, 2008
