= Barbus sp. 'Pangani' =

Conservation status
- Vulnerable (IUCN 3.1)

Scientific classification
- Kingdom: Animalia
- Phylum: Chordata
- Class: Actinopterygii
- Order: Cypriniformes
- Family: Cyprinidae
- Subfamily: Barbinae
- Genus: Barbus
- Species: B. sp. 'Pangani'

Binomial name
- Barbus sp. 'Pangani'

Species of fish

Barbus sp. 'Pangani' is an undescribed but distinct freshwater fish species in the family Cyprinidae. Apparently a close relative of the East African red-finned barb (B. apleurogramma), it is currently under study for its formal description. Until then, this small African barb is provisionally assigned to the genus Barbus, but probably belongs – like "B." apleurogramma – in another genus.

It is apparently endemic to Kenya. The only places where it had been found up to 2006 were N'joro Springs at the River Lumi in the upper Pangani River drainage basin. It might not occur elsewhere. Due to this limited distribution, it was classified as Vulnerable by the IUCN, but this may change when this fish becomes better known.

== See also ==
Other undescribed small barbs from Kenya:

- Barbus sp. 'Nzoia'
- Barbus sp. 'Nzoia 2'
