= Barbus ercisianus =

Conservation status
- Data Deficient (IUCN 3.1)

Scientific classification
- Kingdom: Animalia
- Phylum: Chordata
- Class: Actinopterygii
- Order: Cypriniformes
- Family: Cyprinidae
- Genus: Barbus
- Species: B. ercisianus

Binomial name
- Barbus ercisianus M. S. Karaman, 1971

Synonyms
- Barbus plebejus ercisianus M. S. Karaman, 1971

Species of fish

Barbus ercisianus, also known as the Ercis barbel or Van barbel, is a species of ray-finned fish in the genus Barbus from eastern Turkey, it is classified by the IUCN as Data Deficient due, at least in part, to the uncertain taxonomic position of this taxa, it may be synonymous with B. lacerta.
