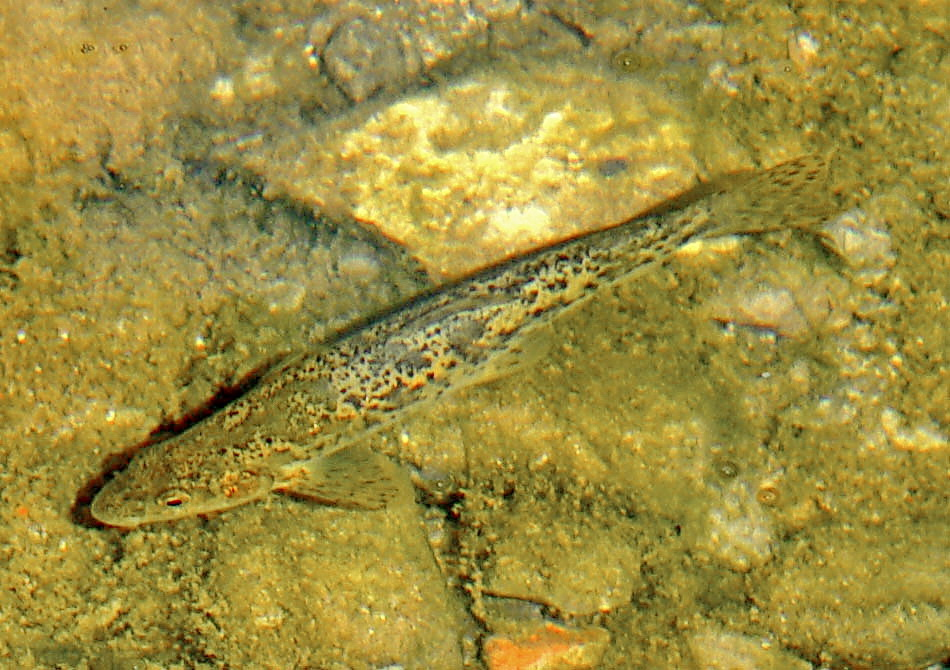

Conservation status
- Least Concern (IUCN 3.1)

Scientific classification
- Domain: Eukaryota
- Kingdom: Animalia
- Phylum: Chordata
- Class: Actinopterygii
- Order: Cypriniformes
- Family: Cyprinidae
- Subfamily: Barbinae
- Genus: Barbus
- Species: B. balcanicus

Binomial name
- Barbus balcanicus Kotlík, Tsigenopoulos, Ráb & Berrebi, 2002

= Danube barbel =

Species of fish

The Danube barbel (Barbus balcanicus) is a species of freshwater fish widespread in southeastern Europe. It is difficult to diagnose from e.g. Barbus carpathicus and Barbus petenyi in the field.
