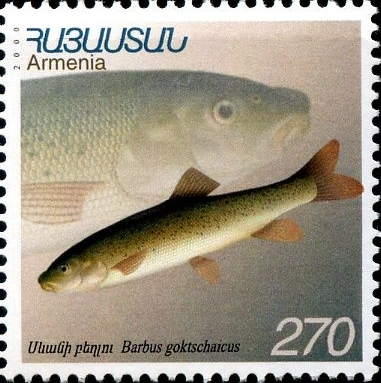

Scientific classification
- Domain: Eukaryota
- Kingdom: Animalia
- Phylum: Chordata
- Class: Actinopterygii
- Order: Cypriniformes
- Family: Cyprinidae
- Subfamily: Barbinae
- Genus: Barbus
- Species: B. goktschaicus

Binomial name
- Barbus goktschaicus Kessler, 1877

= Gokcha barbel =

Species of fish

The Sevan barbel (Barbus goktschaicus) is a species of ray-finned fish in the genus Barbus. It occurs in Lake Sevan and its tributaries. It is often referred to as Gokcha barbel in a literal translation of its scientific name.

As of January 2024, both FishBase and WoRMS consider this taxon to be invalid, as it has been synonymised with Barbus cyri
