= Enteromius atromaculatus =

Conservation status
- Least Concern (IUCN 3.1)

Scientific classification
- Domain: Eukaryota
- Kingdom: Animalia
- Phylum: Chordata
- Class: Actinopterygii
- Order: Cypriniformes
- Family: Cyprinidae
- Subfamily: Smiliogastrinae
- Genus: Enteromius
- Species: E. atromaculatus

Binomial name
- Enteromius atromaculatus Nichols & Griscom, 1917

Synonyms
- Barbus atromaculatus Nichols & Griscom, 1917; Puntius atromaculatus (Nichols & Griscom, 1917); Barbus lepidura Fowler, 1936

Species of fish

Enteromius atromaculatus is a species of ray-finned fish in the genus Barbus.

== Footnotes ==
- Froese, Rainer; Pauly, Daniel (eds.). "Enteromius atromaculatus". FishBase.
