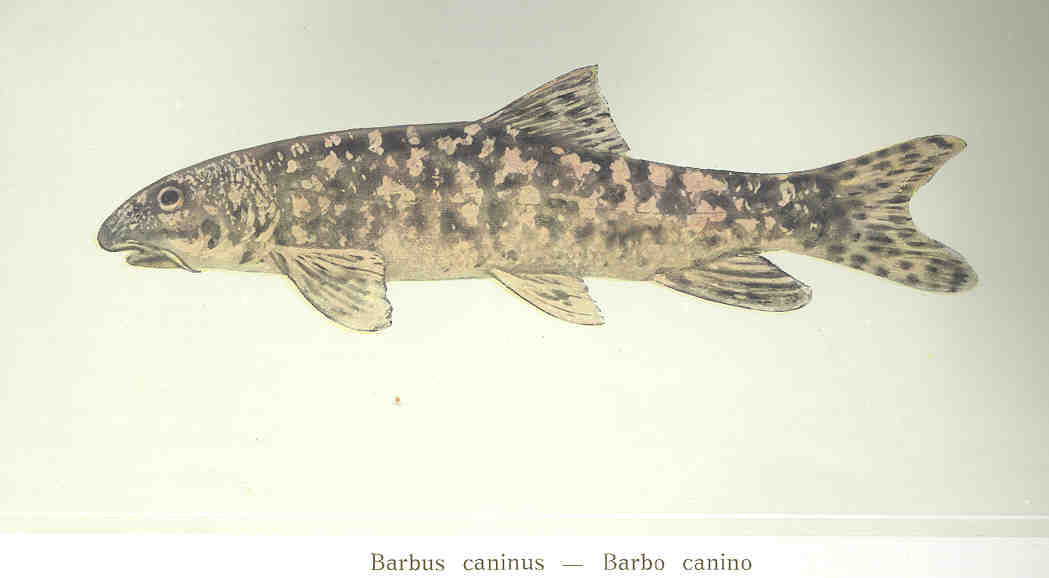

Conservation status
- Near Threatened (IUCN 3.1)

Scientific classification
- Kingdom: Animalia
- Phylum: Chordata
- Class: Actinopterygii
- Order: Cypriniformes
- Family: Cyprinidae
- Subfamily: Barbinae
- Genus: Barbus
- Species: B. caninus

Binomial name
- Barbus caninus Bonaparte, 1839
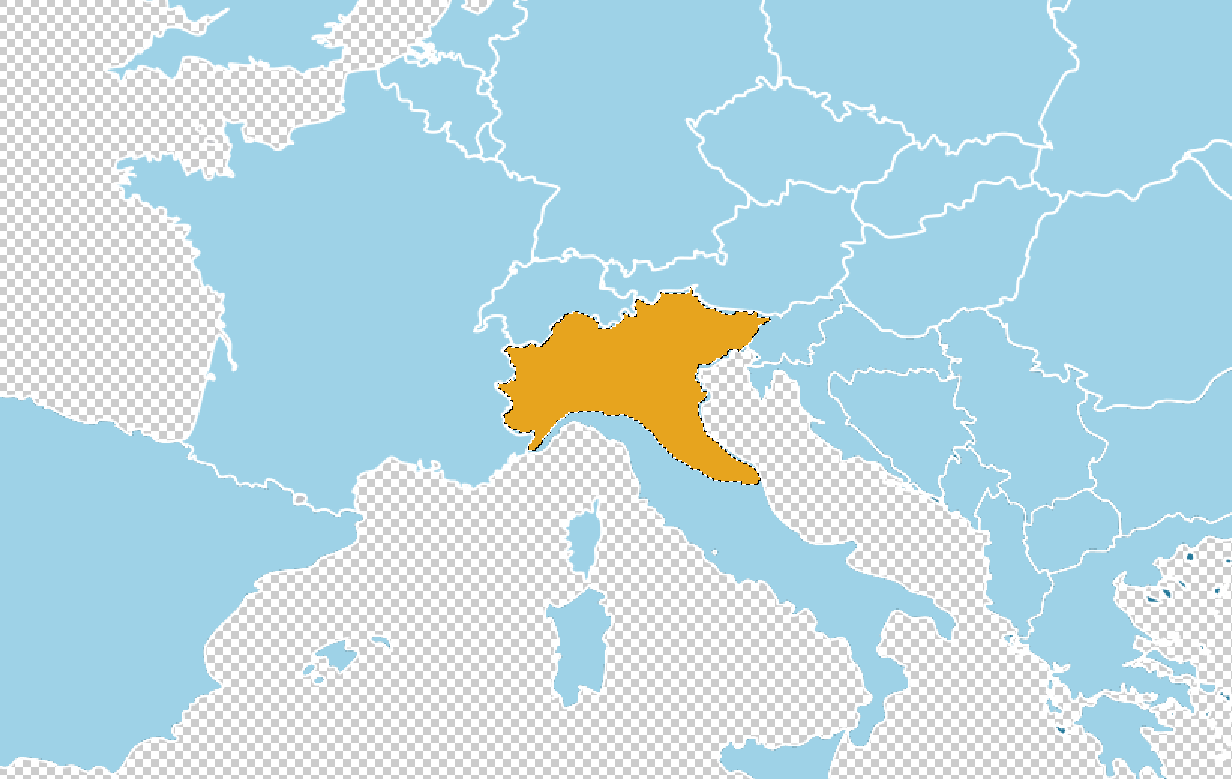

Synonyms
- Barbus caninus Valenciennes, 1842

= Brook barbel =

Species of fish

The brook barbel (Barbus caninus) is a species of ray-finned fish in the family Cyprinidae, the family which includes the carps, barbs and related species. It is found in Italy and Switzerland. Its natural habitat is rivers. It is threatened by habitat degradation and by competition from introduced species

== Taxonomy ==
The brook barbel was first formally described in 1839 by the French art collector and biologist Charles Lucien Bonaparte with its type locality given as the Po in Piedmont Basin in Italy. The brook barb belongs to the genus Barbus, commonly referred to as barbels, which belongs to the subfamily Barbinae of the family Cyprinidae.

== Etymology ==
The brook barbel belongs to the genus Barbus, this name being Latin for "beard" and the genus was named in 1805 by François Marie Daudin as a tautonym with the type species being Cyprinus barbus. This name may also refer to the four barbels possessed by the common barbel, two at the tip of the snout and at one at each corner of mouth, it may also be derived from vernacular names, such as barbylle in Middle English and barbel in Old French. The specific name, caninus, meaning "canine" and coming from the Italian vernacular, barb canin, used in Piedmont for this species.

== Description ==
The brook barbel can be told apart from other Italian barbel species by having between 36 and 47 scales along the lateral line and by the speckled pattern of large irregular spots and blotches on the back, flanks and fins. It has a black peritoneum. The fins are thick and fleshy while the caudal fin has rounded lobes. This species is a maximum standard length of 25 cm (9.8 in).

== Distribution and habitat ==
The brook barbel is endemic to the northern Adriatic Sea catchment in Italy and Switzerland. The northernmost extent of its distribution is in the Marecchia River and south to the Brenta River, encompassing the Po River system. This is a benthic species of subalpine rivers and streams, preferring the middle and upper reaches where the water is cool, clear and with a current. They prefer hard and coarse substrates of gravel, stones, boulders and rock.

== Conservation ==
The brook barbel is assessed as Near Threatened by the International Union for Conservation of Nature. The threats to this species include habitat alteration, pollution and non native invasive species.
