= Barbus sp. 'Nzoia 2' =

Conservation status
- Data Deficient (IUCN 3.1)

Scientific classification
- Kingdom: Animalia
- Phylum: Chordata
- Class: Actinopterygii
- Order: Cypriniformes
- Family: Cyprinidae
- Subfamily: Barbinae
- Genus: Barbus
- Species: B. sp. 'Nzoia 2'

Binomial name
- Barbus sp. 'Nzoia 2'

Species of fish

Barbus sp. 'Nzoia 2' is an undescribed but distinct ray-finned fish species in the family Cyprinidae. It was first reported in 1999. A small African barb, it is provisionally assigned to the genus Barbus, but probably belongs – like similar species – in another genus.

It is apparently endemic to Kenya. The only places where it has been found to date are in the Nzoia River drainage basin of the Lake Victoria region; it might occur elsewhere though. It may be a threatened species, but too little is known about its distribution, population size and taxonomy to judge its status with a higher level of certainty. Therefore, it is classified as Data Deficient by the IUCN, but this will change when this fish becomes better known.

== See also ==
Other undescribed small barbs from Kenya:

- Barbus sp. 'Nzoia'
- Barbus sp. 'Pangani'
