= Wildlife of Greece =

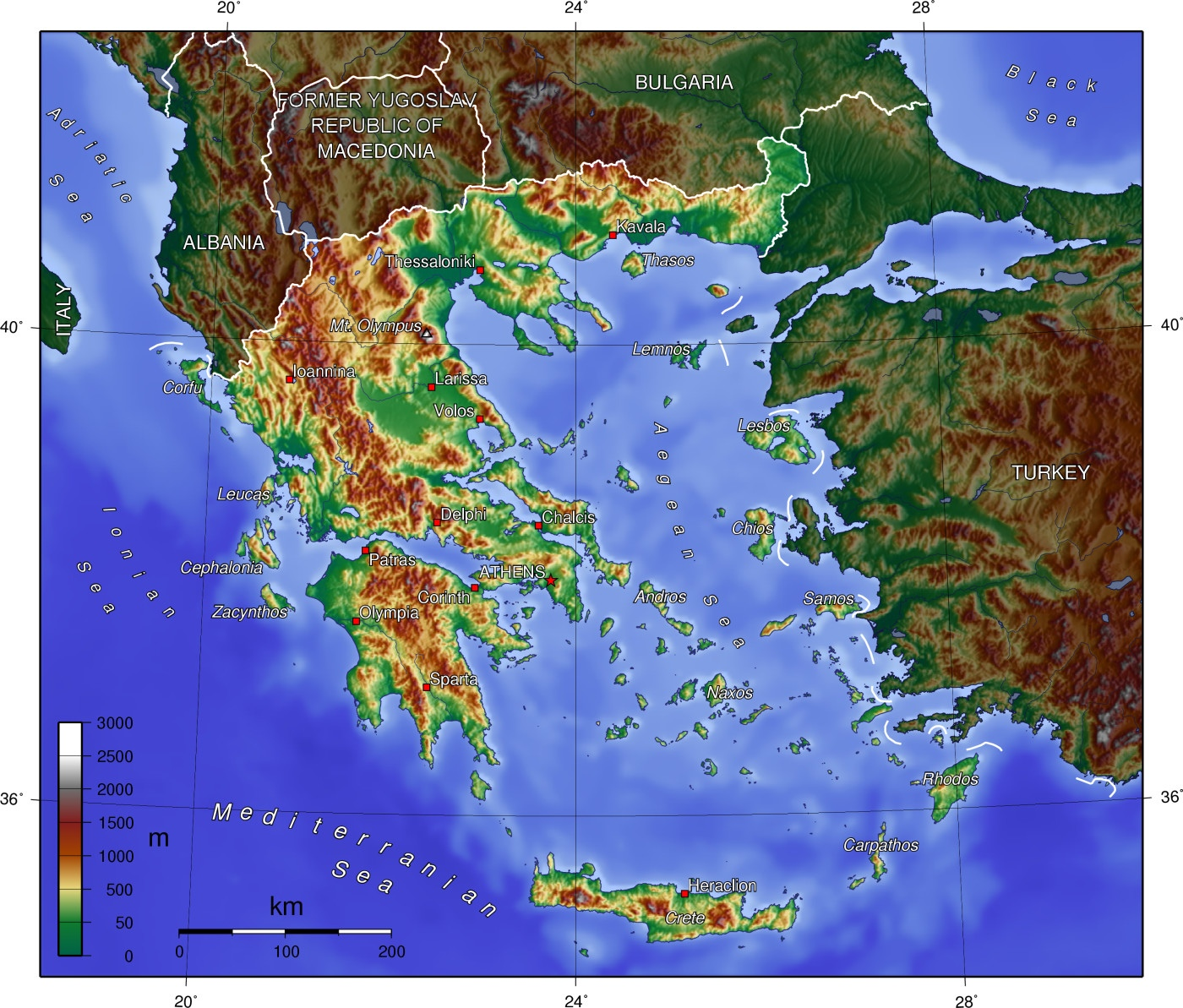
Topographic map of Greece

The wildlife of Greece includes the diverse flora, fauna, and funga of Greece, a country in southern Europe. The country is mostly mountainous with a very long, convoluted coastline, consisting of peninsulas and many islands. The climate ranges from Mediterranean through temperate to alpine, and the habitats include mountains, hills, forests, rivers, lakes, coasts and cultivated land.

== Geography ==
Greece is a country in the Balkan Peninsula of southern Europe, and lies to the south of Albania, North Macedonia and Bulgaria, and west of Turkey. It has a long coastline with the Mediterranean Sea and the Aegean Sea, and includes the island of Crete and many smaller islands. Mainland Greece covers about 80% of the total territory and is largely mountainous. The largest mountain group is the Pindus Range which forms the spine of the Greek mainland, with the highest peak rising to 2,637 m (8,652 ft) above sea level. The country's tallest mountain, Mount Olympus is further east, and rises to 2,918 m (9,573 ft) above sea level. The large Peloponnese peninsula, in the south of the country, is separated from the rest of the Greek mainland by the Corinthian and Saronic Gulfs, but joined by the Isthmus of Corinth.

== Climate ==
Much of the country experiences a Mediterranean climate with warm or hot, dry summers and the rainfall falling in winter. The islands mostly have a Mediterranean climate, with the climate of Crete being particularly influenced by its maritime surroundings and proximity to Africa. Higher regions of the western and central parts of the country, and the mountainous parts of the Peloponnese, experience an alpine climate. The climate is very varied across the country; snow may still be lying near the peaks in June while the lowlands are experiencing high temperatures.

== Flora ==
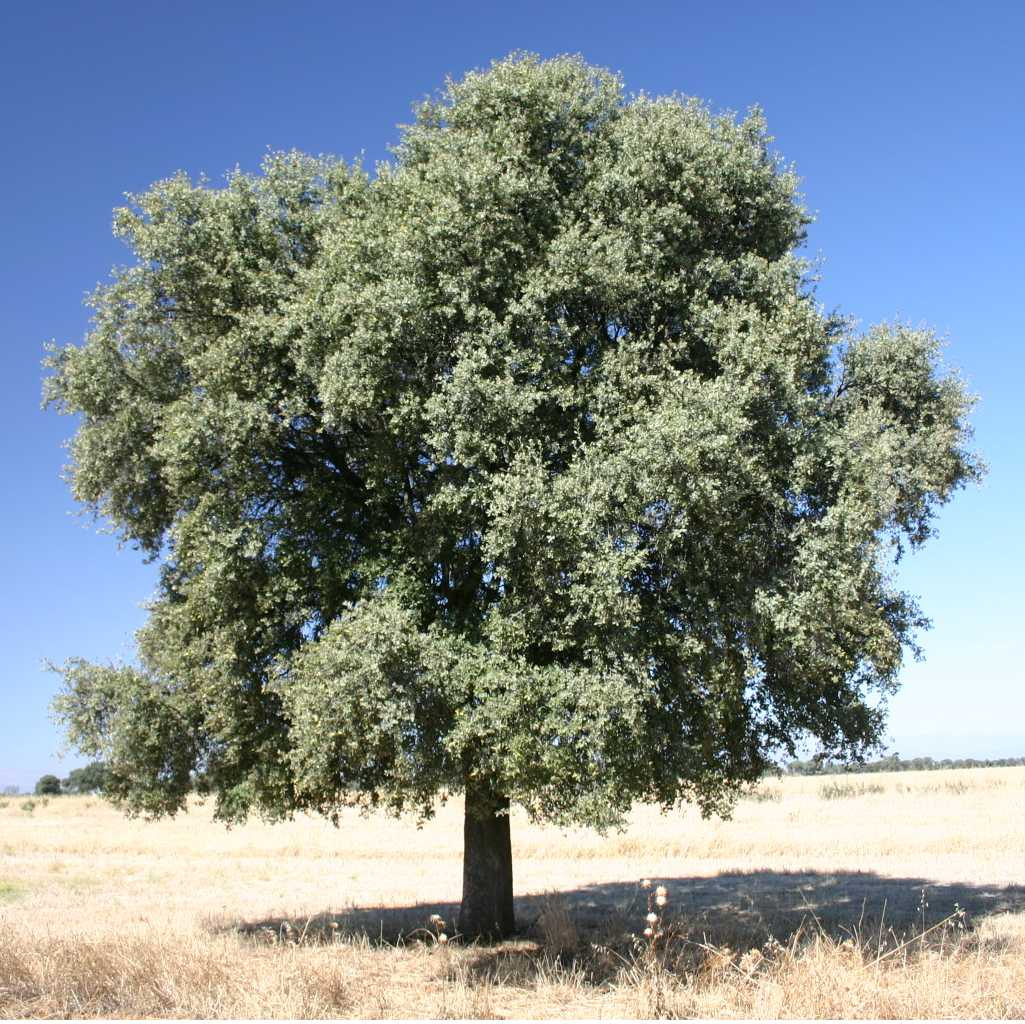
Evergreen oak

Greece includes a great diversity of vascular plants among its flora. In 2013, there were 5,752 species and 1,893 subspecies of native and introduced plants, for a total of 6,620 taxa, including 1,278 endemic species and 452 endemic subspecies. By June 2018, the number of species had been revised upwards with 6,695 taxa being listed, consisting of 5,828 species and 1,982 subspecies, belonging to 1,073 genera and 185 families.

Much of Greece lies within the Aegean and Western Turkey sclerophyllous and mixed forests ecoregion. This is characterised by maquis shrubland which includes the evergreen oak and the Greek strawberry tree, as well as the kermes oak, the strawberry tree, green olive, the bay laurel, the cedar, the Spanish broom and others. Intensive land use has reduced these forests to remnants. Of the deciduous species most common are the ash, the elm, the Montpellier maple, the Judas tree, the terebinth, the smoke tree and others. Greece was connected to western Turkey during the Pliocene era, and the two countries include many identical plants among their flora. The Cretan date palm has a very restricted range in southern Greece and Crete, with a few stands in Turkey.

== Fauna ==
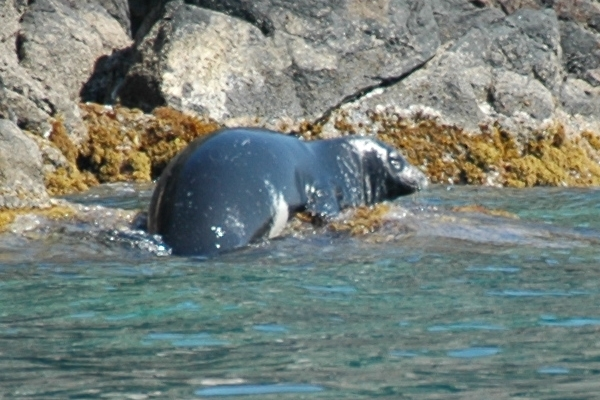
Mediterranean monk seal on rocky shore on Serifos

Larger, carnivorous mammals found in Greece include the European wildcat, the Balkan lynx, the red fox, the golden jackal, the grey wolf, the Eurasian brown bear, the American mink, the least weasel, the European polecat, the marbled polecat, the beech marten, the European pine marten, the European badger, the Eurasian otter and about twenty species of bat. The island of Gyaros is the breeding area for the largest population of the endangered Mediterranean monk seal, and about fifteen species of whales, dolphins and porpoises are reported in Greek waters.

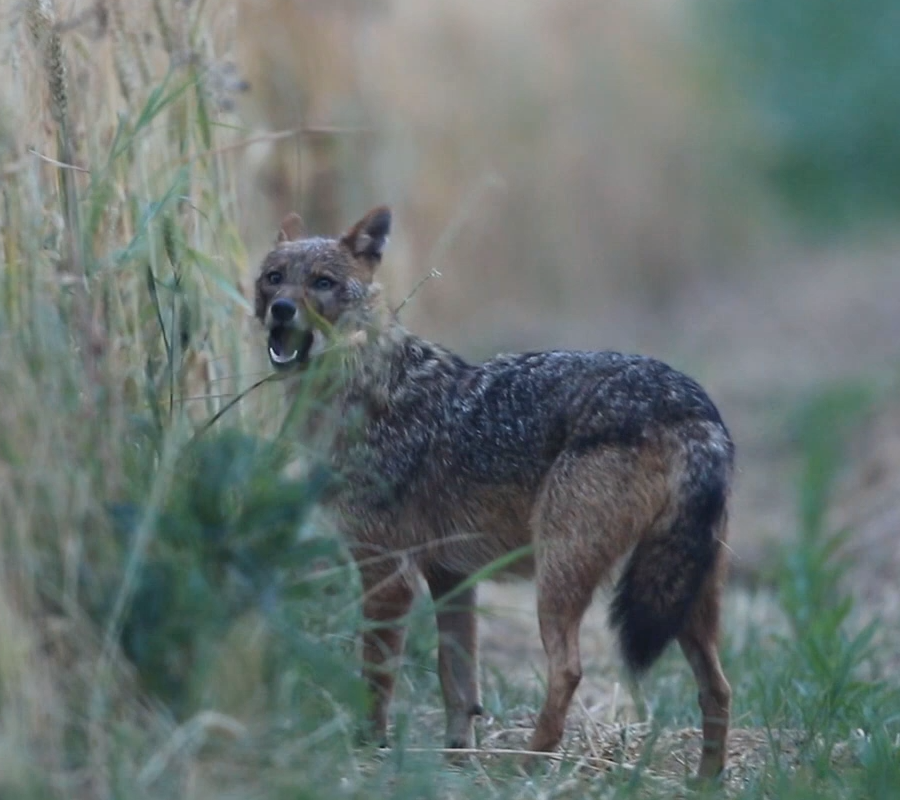
Golden jackal in central Macedonia

Ungulates found in Greece include the wild boar, the red deer, the fallow deer, the roe deer, the chamois and the endangered Cretan ibex. Also present are the European rabbit and the European hare, the southern white-breasted hedgehog and the northern white-breasted hedgehog, the European mole, some ten species of shrew and around thirty species of rodent (squirrels, dormice, mice, rats and voles).

With its varied topography and habitats, Greece has a rich bird fauna. It is a meeting point for birds of three continents, the southern limit for some species and the northern limit for others. Beside the resident bird populations, many migratory species visit the country as they move seasonally between their breeding grounds and their overwintering areas. About 450 species of bird have been recorded in Greece. The Dadia Forest in the northeast is an important area for birds of prey, where four species of vulture are among the thirty-six diurnal species of raptor that have been recorded.

Birds commonly found in the maquis shrubland include the eastern subalpine and Rüppell's warblers, the cirl, rock and black-headed buntings, and the rock, red-legged and chukar partridges. Wetland birds are well catered for by a number of Ramsar sites such as Lake Kerkini, the Nestos Delta, and the Evros Delta and their freshwater marshes, lakes, brackish lagoons, saltmarshes and mudflats.

Greece's rivers are brimming with aquatic wildlife too, with a diverse range of endemic freshwater fishes, around 160 species were listed in 2015. There are also several species of lampreys, notably three species of lamprey endemic to Greece; the Epirus brook lamprey, Greek brook lamprey and Almopaios brook lamprey. Lake inhabitants include the endemic Macedonian shad, formerly a fish that was commercially fished. Within the cyprinid fishes, there are five endemic barbels, including an island endemic; the Evia barbel, found only on Euboea. There are also four endemic chubs, three endemic roaches, two endemic rudds and the entire minnowroach genus Tropidophoxinellus is endemic to Greek freshwater.
