= Barbus cyclolepis =

Conservation status
- Least Concern (IUCN 3.1)

Scientific classification
- Kingdom: Animalia
- Phylum: Chordata
- Class: Actinopterygii
- Order: Cypriniformes
- Family: Cyprinidae
- Subfamily: Barbinae
- Genus: Barbus
- Species: B. cyclolepis

Binomial name
- Barbus cyclolepis Heckel, 1837

Synonyms
- See text

Species of fish

Barbus cyclolepis, the round-scaled barbel, is a freshwater fish species in the family Cyprinidae. It is found in Bulgaria, Greece, and Turkey. Its natural habitats are rivers and intermittent rivers. It is not considered a threatened species by the IUCN.

A broader concept of Barbus cyclolepis would include in the same species several other barbel taxa that others consider distinct species, i.e. Barbus sperchiensis (Sprechios barbel), Barbus strumicae (Strumica barbel) and Barbus waleckii (Vistula barbel). B. waleckii has however also been suggested to be a hybridogenic species, perhaps derived from common barbel B. barbus and B. carpathicus.
