= Barbus sp. 'Nzoia' =

Conservation status
- Vulnerable (IUCN 3.1)

Scientific classification
- Kingdom: Animalia
- Phylum: Chordata
- Class: Actinopterygii
- Order: Cypriniformes
- Family: Cyprinidae
- Subfamily: Barbinae
- Genus: Barbus
- Species: B. sp. 'Nzoia'

Binomial name
- Barbus sp. 'Nzoia'

Species of fish

Barbus sp. 'Nzoia' is an undescribed but distinct freshwater fish species in the family Cyprinidae. It was first reported in 1999. A small African barb, it is provisionally assigned to the genus Barbus, but probably belongs – like similar species – in another genus.

It has been found only in Kenya. The only places where it has been found to date are in the Nzoia River drainage basin of the Lake Victoria region. It might not occur elsewhere. Due to this limited distribution, it was classified as Vulnerable in the IUCN Red List in 2006, but was omitted from more recent list versions.

== See also ==
Other undescribed small barbs from Kenya:

- Barbus sp. 'Nzoia 2'
- Barbus sp. 'Pangani'
