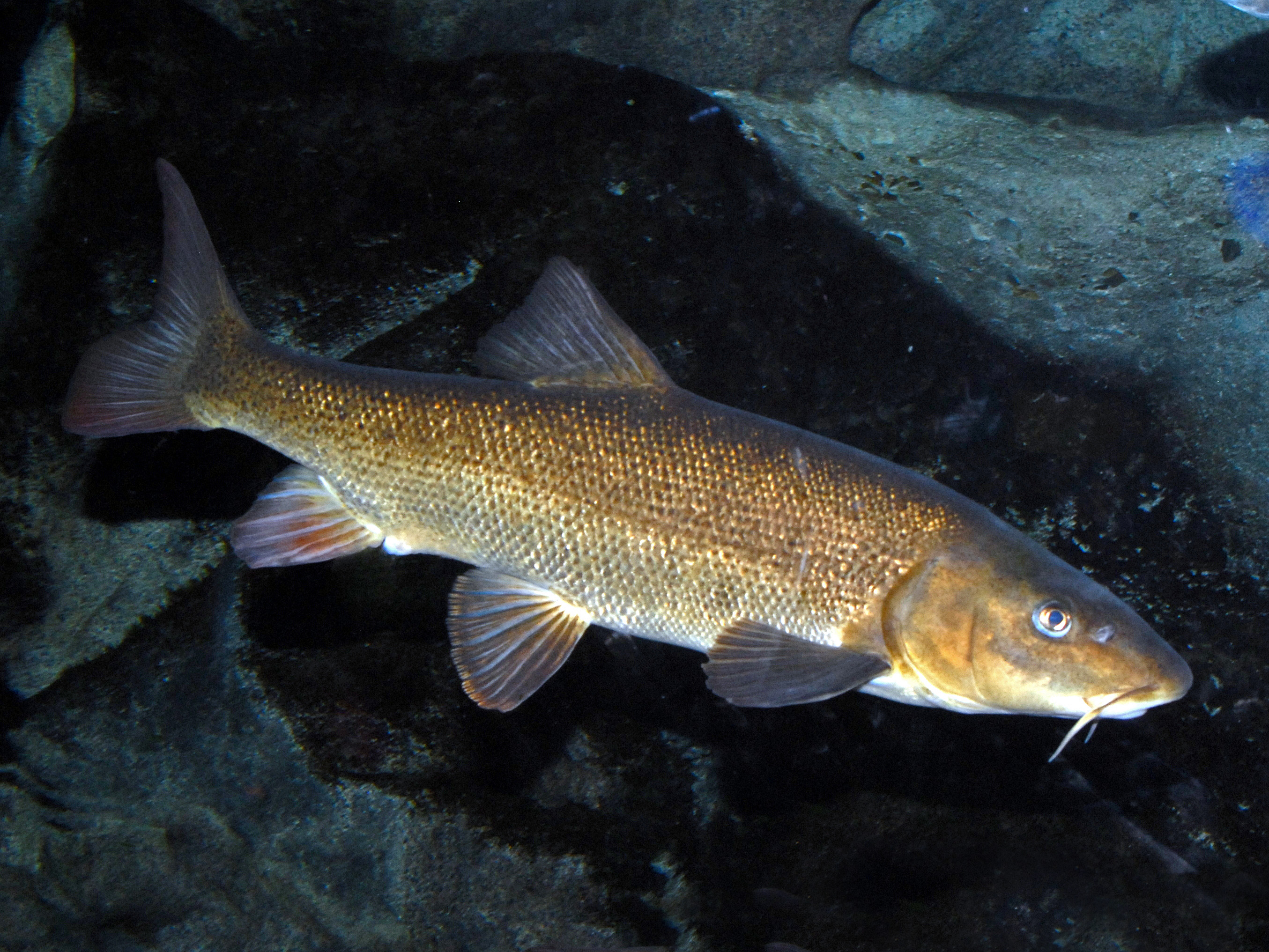

Conservation status
- Near Threatened (IUCN 3.1)

Scientific classification
- Kingdom: Animalia
- Phylum: Chordata
- Class: Actinopterygii
- Order: Cypriniformes
- Family: Cyprinidae
- Subfamily: Barbinae
- Genus: Barbus
- Species: B. plebejus

Binomial name
- Barbus plebejus Bonaparte, 1839
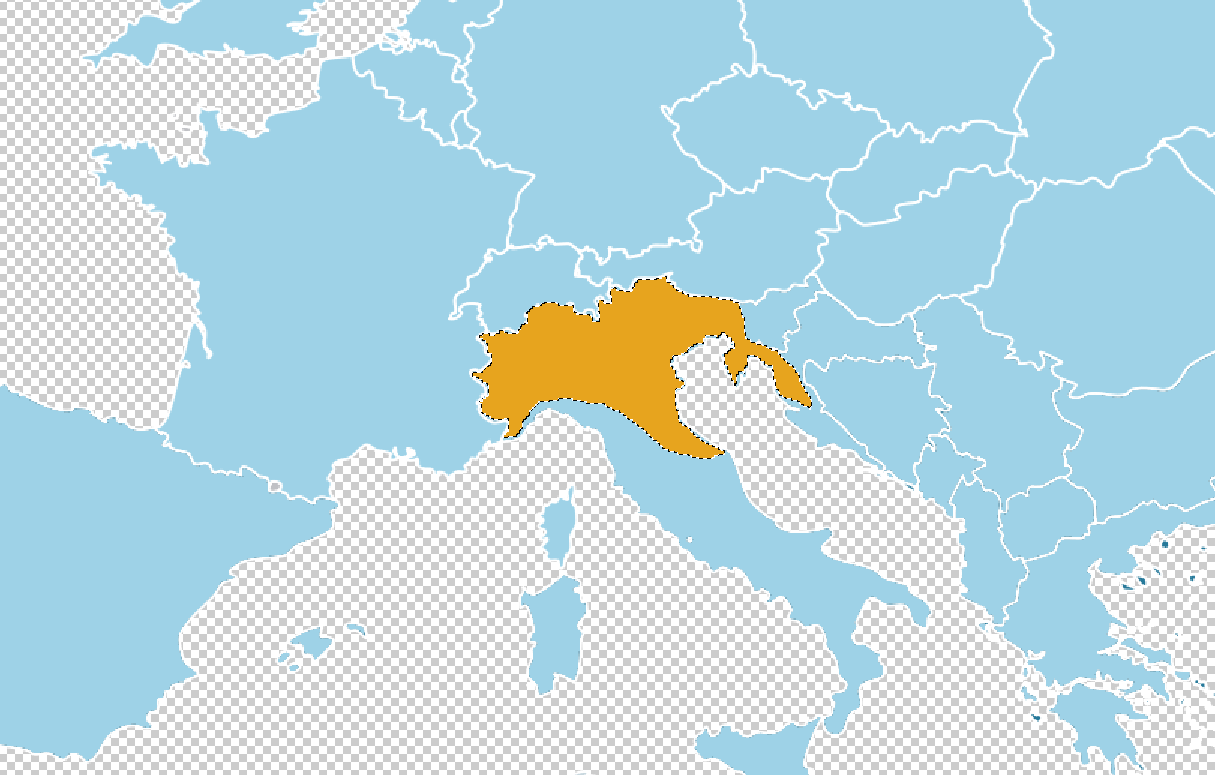

= Italian barbel =

Species of fish

The Italian barbel (Barbus plebejus) is a species of freshwater fish in the family Cyprinidae, nearly related to the common barbel Barbus barbus. The name barbel derived from the Latin barba, meaning beard, a reference to the two pairs of barbels, a longer pair pointing forwards and slightly down positioned, on the side of the mouth.

== Description ==
Barbus plebejus can reach a maximum length of 70 cm (28 in) in males and a maximum weight of 6 kilograms (13 lb). Usually, it is much smaller. It has a long and slender body, with a mouth equipped with characteristic four barbels (hence the common and genus names). It has greenish back with black dots, sides finely dotted, whitish belly, paired fins tinged with grey and a slightly thorny dorsal ray. Lower lip has a median lobe.

== Distribution ==
The species is found in Croatia, Italy, Slovenia and Switzerland.

== Habitat ==
Like the common barbel, these long-lived fishes have their natural habitats in running waters of rivers and rarely freshwater lakes. They inhabit the water just above the bottom (benthopelagic), feeding on benthic invertebrates, small fish and algae. They also migrate within freshwater (potamodromous), for spawning purposes. It is not considered a threatened species by the IUCN.
