= Barbus stappersii =

Scientific classification
- Domain: Eukaryota
- Kingdom: Animalia
- Phylum: Chordata
- Class: Actinopterygii
- Order: Cypriniformes
- Family: Cyprinidae
- Genus: Barbus
- Species: B. stappersii

Binomial name
- Barbus stappersii Boulenger, 1915

Species of fish

Barbus stappersii is a species of ray-finned fish in the genus Barbus.

== Footnotes ==
- Froese, Rainer; Pauly, Daniel (eds.). "Barbus stappersii". FishBase.
