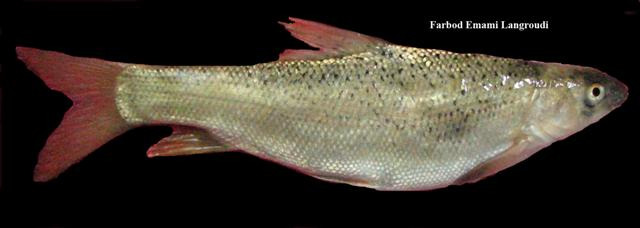

Conservation status
- Least Concern (IUCN 3.1)

Scientific classification
- Kingdom: Animalia
- Phylum: Chordata
- Class: Actinopterygii
- Division: Teleostei
- Order: Cypriniformes
- Family: Cyprinidae
- Subfamily: Barbinae
- Genus: Barbus
- Species: B. lacerta

Binomial name
- Barbus lacerta Heckel, 1843

Synonyms
- Barbus caucasius Kessler, 1877; Barbus ercisianus Karaman, 1971; Barbus plebejus ercisianus Karaman, 1971; Barbus plebejus kosswigi Karaman, 1971; Barbus scincus Heckel, 1843; Luciobarbus kosswigi (Karaman, 1971)

= Lizard barbel =

Species of fish

The lizard barbel (Barbus lacerta), also known as Kura barbel, is a species of freshwater cyprinid fish from the Near East region. Kosswig's barbel is now a synonym, which also places the species in the Tigris–Euphrates river system of the Middle east.

The specific epithet lacerta is Latin for lizard, but the allusion was not explained by Heckel.

== Subspecies ==
The species is monotypic, with no subspecies accepted as valid. However, two former subspecies have been elevated to full species status:

- B. l. cyri De Filippi, 1865, accepted as Barbus cyri
- B. l. escherichii Steindachner, 1897 accepted as Luciobarbus escherichii
