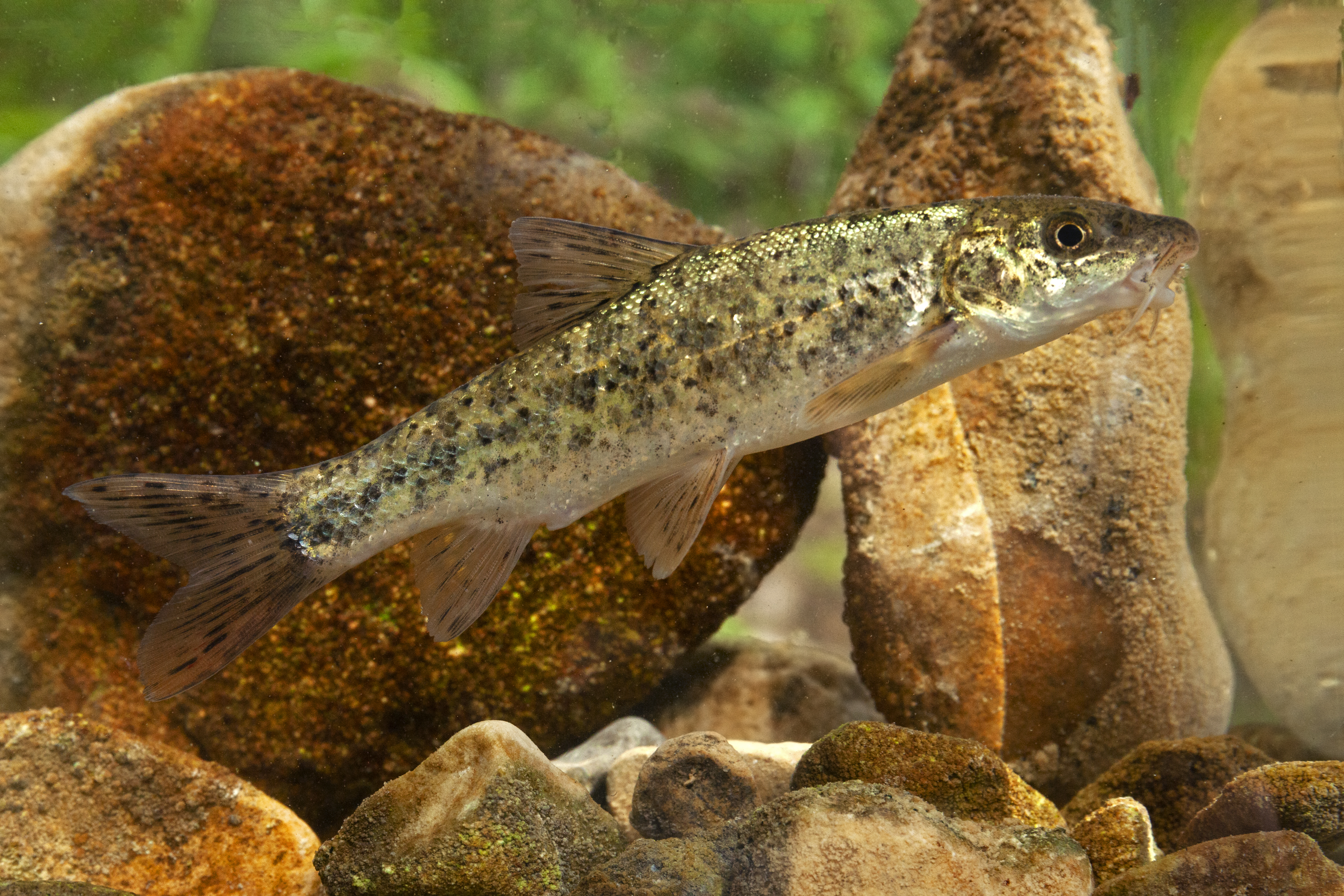

Conservation status
- Endangered (IUCN 3.1)

Scientific classification
- Kingdom: Animalia
- Phylum: Chordata
- Class: Actinopterygii
- Order: Cypriniformes
- Family: Cyprinidae
- Subfamily: Barbinae
- Genus: Barbus
- Species: B. tyberinus

Binomial name
- Barbus tyberinus Bonaparte, 1839

= Horse barbel =

Species of fish

The horse barbel (Barbus tyberinus) is a species of ray-finned fish in the genus Barbus which is endemic to Italy.
