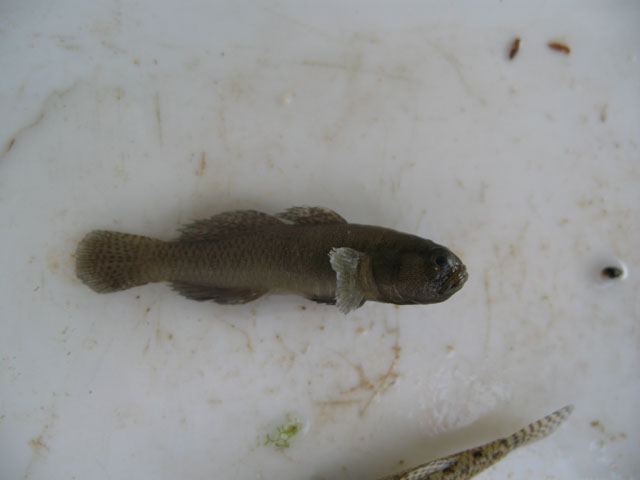
- Economidichthys pygmaeus

Scientific classification
- Kingdom: Animalia
- Phylum: Chordata
- Class: Actinopterygii
- Order: Gobiiformes
- Family: Oxudercidae
- Subfamily: Gobionellinae
- Genus: Economidichthys; Bianco, Bullock, P. J. Miller & Roubal, 1987

Type species
- Gobius pygmaeus Holly, 1929

= Economidichthys =

Economidichthys Temporal range: Middle Miocene to present

Genus of fishes

Economidichthys is a genus of freshwater gobies endemic to Greece. The name of this genus honours the Greek ichthyologist Panos Economidis.

== Species ==
There are currently two recognized species in this genus:

- Economidichthys mornosensis
- Economidichthys pygmaeus (Holly, 1929) (Western Greece goby)
- Economidichthys trichonis Economidis & P. J. Miller, 1990 (Trichonis dwarf goby)

The fossil species †Economidichthys altidorsalis Schwarzhans, Bradić & Bratishko, 2016 is known from the Middle Miocene of Austria, while †Economidichthys triangularis (Weiler, 1943) is known from the Middle Miocene of Romania and Croatia. These species inhabited marine habitats, suggesting that modern Economidichthys species are descendants of marine taxa.
