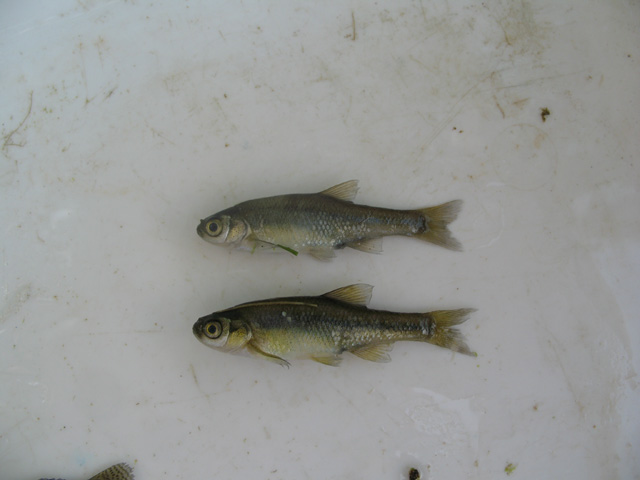
- Epiros minnow (Pelasgus thesproticus)

Scientific classification
- Kingdom: Animalia
- Phylum: Chordata
- Class: Actinopterygii
- Order: Cypriniformes
- Family: Leuciscidae
- Subfamily: Leuciscinae
- Genus: Pelasgus; Kottelat & Freyhof, 2007

Type species
- Pseudophoxinus laconicus Kottelat & Barbieri, 2004

= Pelasgus (fish) =

Genus of fishes

Pelasgus is a genus of freshwater ray-finned fishes belonging to the family Leuciscidae, which includes the daces, Eurasian minnows and related species. The fishes in the genus are endemic to the Balkans.

== Species ==
These are currently described species in this genus:

- Pelasgus epiroticus (Steindachner, 1895)
- Pelasgus laconicus (Kottelat & Barbieri, 2004) (Evrotas minnow)
- Pelasgus marathonicus (Vinciguerra, 1921) (Marathon minnow)
- Pelasgus minutus (S. L. Karaman, 1924) (Ohrid minnow)
- Pelasgus prespensis (S. L. Karaman, 1924) (Prespa minnow)
- Pelasgus stymphalicus (Valenciennes, 1844) (dáska)
- Pelasgus thesproticus (Stephanidis, 1939) (Epiros minnow)
