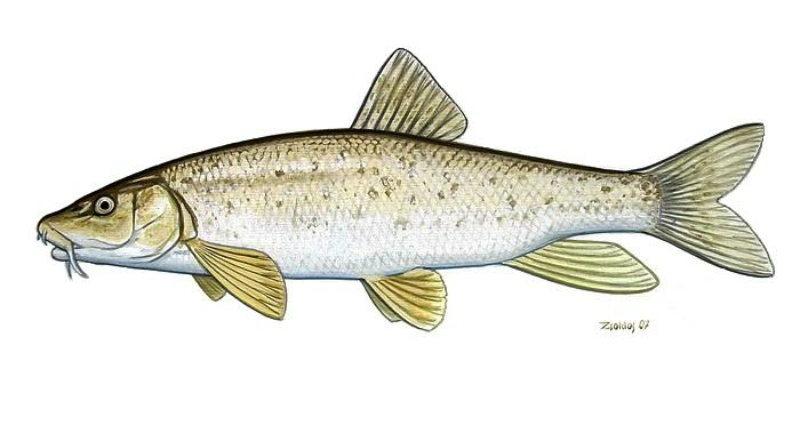

Conservation status
- Least Concern (IUCN 3.1)

Scientific classification
- Kingdom: Animalia
- Phylum: Chordata
- Class: Actinopterygii
- Order: Cypriniformes
- Family: Cyprinidae
- Subfamily: Barbinae
- Genus: Barbus
- Species: B. peloponnesius

Binomial name
- Barbus peloponnesius Valenciennes in Cuvier & Valenciennes, 1842

Synonyms
- Pseudobarbus leonhardi Bielz, 1853; Barbus meridionalis petenyi (Heckel, 1847) and see text

= Barbus peloponnesius =

Species of fish

Barbus peloponnesius is a ray-finned fish species in the family Cyprinidae. The western Balkan barbel (B. rebeli) is sometimes included in the present species.

It is found only in Greece, Bulgaria and Albania. Its natural habitats are rivers and freshwater lakes. It is not considered a threatened species by the IUCN, however a subspecies, Barbus peloponnesius petenyi, is protected and considered threatened. The latter can be found in the Danube basin, particularly in areas of the Duna-Ipoly National Park in Hungary.
