= Ohrid minnow =

Conservation status
- Vulnerable (IUCN 3.1)

Scientific classification
- Kingdom: Animalia
- Phylum: Chordata
- Class: Actinopterygii
- Division: Teleostei
- Order: Cypriniformes
- Family: Leuciscidae
- Subfamily: Leuciscinae
- Genus: Pelasgus
- Species: P. minutus

Binomial name
- Pelasgus minutus (S. L. Karaman, 1924)

Synonyms
- Paraphoxinus minutus S. L. Karaman, 1924; Pseudophoxinus minutus (S. L. Karaman 1924); Phoxinellus minutus (Karaman, 1924)

Species of fish

The Ohrid minnow (Pelasgus minutus) is a species of freshwater ray-finned fish belonging to the family Leuciscidae, which includes the daces, Eurasian minnows and related species. It is found in the Western Balkans.

== Taxonomy ==
The Ohrid minnow was first formally described as Paraphoxinus minutus by the Yugoslav ichthyologist Stanko Karaman, with its type locality given as Lake Ohrid and its backwaters in Macedonia. This species is now classified in the genus Pelasgus within the subfamily Leuciscinae of the family Leuciscidae.

== Etymology ==
The Ohrid minnow belongs to the genus Pelasgus. This name is derived from the Pelasgians, the ancient people who lived around the Aegean Sea before the arrival of the Indo-European speaking ancestors of the Greeks in the second millennium B.C.E., and alludes to the fishes in this genus all being found in the Balkans. The specific name, minutus, means "small", a reference to the smaller scales of this species than its original presumed congeners in Paraphoxinus, a taxon now regarded as a synonym of Pseudophoxinus.

== Description ==
The Ohrid minnow has 3 spines and 7 soft rays in the dorsal fin, and 3 spines and 6 soft rays in the anal fin. This species has only a limited number of relatively large scales on the body. It has a relatively longer body and shorter tail than Pelasgus epiroticus, as well as larger eyes and a wider, longer head. Its lower lip extends slightly beyond the upper lip, and the mouth opening is relatively small, but still larger than that of P. epiroticus. This fish has a maximum standard length of 5 cm (2.0 in).

== Distribution and habitat ==
The Ohrid minnow is endemic to the Western Balkans, where it is found in the Lake Ohrid drainage system in North Macedonia and Albania, the Lake Skadar drainage system in Albania and Montenegro, the Black Drin in Albania and Montenegro, and two coastal streams flowing into the Bay of Kotor between the cities of Tivat and Budva in Montenegro. This species prefers water bodies with slow-moving or stangnant water where there is a lot of aquatic vegetation, typically in spring fed wetlands and lakes from sea level to upland plateaux.
