= Barbus pergamonensis =

Conservation status
- Least Concern (IUCN 3.1)

Scientific classification
- Domain: Eukaryota
- Kingdom: Animalia
- Phylum: Chordata
- Class: Actinopterygii
- Order: Cypriniformes
- Family: Cyprinidae
- Subfamily: Barbinae
- Genus: Barbus
- Species: B. pergamonensis

Binomial name
- Barbus pergamonensis M. S. Karaman (sr), 1971

Species of fish

Barbus pergamonensis is a species of ray-finned fish in the genus Barbus. It occurs in western Turkey and on the island of Lesbos.
