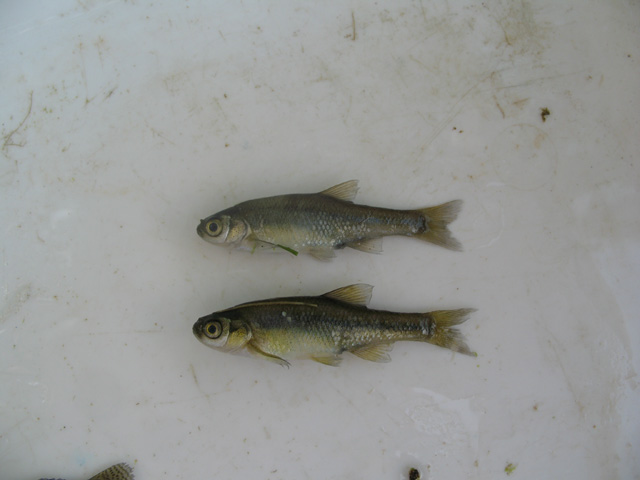

Conservation status
- Near Threatened (IUCN 3.1)

Scientific classification
- Kingdom: Animalia
- Phylum: Chordata
- Class: Actinopterygii
- Order: Cypriniformes
- Family: Leuciscidae
- Subfamily: Leuciscinae
- Genus: Pelasgus
- Species: P. thesproticus

Binomial name
- Pelasgus thesproticus (Stephanidis, 1939)

Synonyms
- Leucaspius stymphalicus var. thesproticus Stephanidis, 1939; Pseudophoxinus thesproticus (Stephanidis 1939)

= Epiros minnow =

Species of fish

The Epiros minnow (Pelasgus thesproticus), or Thesprotian minnow, is a species of freshwater ray-finned fish belonging to the family Leuciscidae, which includes the daces, Eurasian minnows and related species. It is endemic to the Western Balkans.

== Taxonomy ==
The Epiros minnow was first formally described as Leucaspius stymphalicus var. thesproticus in 1939 by the Greek ichthyologist Alexander I. Stephanidis, with its type locality given as Paramythias marsh, Scoupitsa and Grica villages, Thesprotia in Greece. This species is now classified in the genus Pelasgus within the subfamily Leuciscinae of the family Leuciscidae.

== Etymology ==
The Epiros minnow belongs to the genus Pelasgus. This name is derived from the Pelasgians, the ancient people who lived around the Aegean Sea before the arrival of the Indo-European speaking ancestors of the Greeks in the second millennium B.C.E., and alludes to the fishes in this genus all being found in the Balkans. The specific name, thesproticus, means "of Threspotia", a reference to the type locality.

== Description ==
The Epiros minnow is a small fish with a maximum standard length of 6.2 cm (2.4 in).

== Distribution and habitat ==
The Epiros minnow is endemic to the Western Balkans, where it is found in the northeastern Aegean Sea basin in Albania and Greece, including Corfu. On the mainland its range extends from Vjosa in Albania to the Acheron in Greece. Pelasgus minnows in Laka Zazari (el. Ζαραβίνα) and the nearby portion of the upper Thyamis are thought to be the possibly extinct P. epiroticus. This species, like other members of its genus, prefers slow-moving to near-stagnant water bodies with abundant aquatic vegetation. These are mostly small streams, spring-fed wetlands and oligotrophic lakes, which can be located at altitudes from sea level to upland plateaus. It is also able to colonise artificial drainage canals. Some populations live in non-perennial streams and small rivers, where they spend the dry periods in residual pools or perennial spring-fed stretches.

== Conservation ==
The Epiros minnow is classified as Near Threatened by the International Union for Conservation of Nature. It is threatened by habitat degradation, water abstraction, pollution and non-native invasive fishes.
