= Biharian barbel =

Scientific classification
- Domain: Eukaryota
- Kingdom: Animalia
- Phylum: Chordata
- Class: Actinopterygii
- Order: Cypriniformes
- Family: Cyprinidae
- Subfamily: Barbinae
- Genus: Barbus
- Species: B. biharicus

Binomial name
- Barbus biharicus Antal, László & Kotlík, 2016

Species of fish

The Biharian barbel (Barbus biharicus) is a species of ray-finned fish in the genus Barbus. It is found in the Sebes-Körös River in Hungary and Romania.

A 2016 study discovered a new species of barbels, named as Barbus biharicus, in the Danube river basin. It was also found that the rheophilic B. biharicus is different from the other three species found in that area B. balcanicus, B. carpathicus and B. petenyi as it has deeper head than B. carpathicus and B. petenyi. Additionally, it also has larger interorbital and prenatal distance than all other species. Morphological structures of B. biharicus were observed be different from other species as well. B. biharicus have round and short snout, shorter anal fins, however, longer pectoral fins than the other species. Small dark spots are also generally present on the dorsal region of the fish body.
