= Kuban barbel =

Conservation status
- Least Concern (IUCN 3.1)

Scientific classification
- Kingdom: Animalia
- Phylum: Chordata
- Class: Actinopterygii
- Order: Cypriniformes
- Family: Cyprinidae
- Subfamily: Barbinae
- Genus: Barbus
- Species: B. kubanicus

Binomial name
- Barbus kubanicus L. S. Berg, 1912

Species of fish

The Kuban barbel (Barbus kubanicus) is a species of ray-finned fish in the family Cyprinidae. It is found in the Kuban River to the Sea of Azov.
