= Kosswig's barbel =

Scientific classification
- Domain: Eukaryota
- Kingdom: Animalia
- Phylum: Chordata
- Class: Actinopterygii
- Order: Cypriniformes
- Family: Cyprinidae
- Subfamily: Barbinae
- Genus: Luciobarbus
- Species: L. kosswigi

Binomial name
- Luciobarbus kosswigi M. S. Karaman, 1971

Species of fish

Kosswig's barbel (Luciobarbus kosswigi) is a species of ray-finned fish in the genus Luciobarbus. It is found in the Tigris watershed in Turkey.

As of January 2024, both FishBase and WoRMS consider this taxon to be invalid, as it has been synonymised with Barbus lacerta
