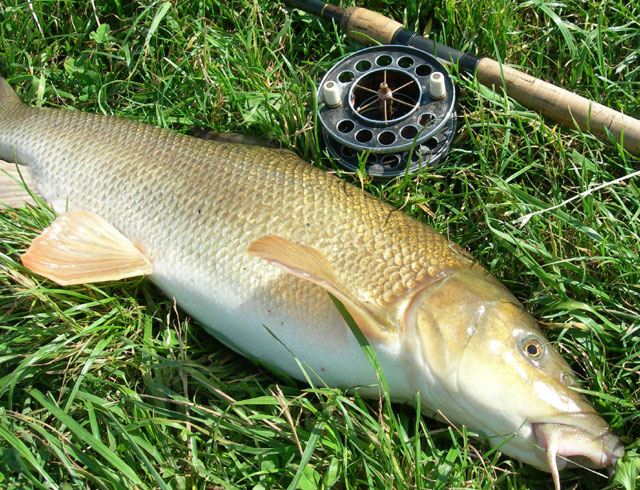

Scientific classification
- Kingdom: Animalia
- Phylum: Chordata
- Class: Actinopterygii
- Division: Teleostei
- Order: Cypriniformes
- Family: Cyprinidae
- Subfamily: Barbinae
- Genus: Barbus
- Species: B. borysthenicus

Binomial name
- Barbus borysthenicus Dybowski, 1862

= Dnieper barbel =

Species of fish

The Dnieper barbel (Barbus borysthenicus) is a species of cyprinid fish in the genus Barbus.

== Footnotes ==
- Froese, Rainer; Pauly, Daniel (eds.). "Barbus borysthenicus". FishBase.
