= Evrotas minnow =

Conservation status
- Endangered (IUCN 3.1)

Scientific classification
- Kingdom: Animalia
- Phylum: Chordata
- Class: Actinopterygii
- Order: Cypriniformes
- Family: Leuciscidae
- Subfamily: Leuciscinae
- Genus: Pelasgus
- Species: P. laconicus

Binomial name
- Pelasgus laconicus (Kottelat & Barbieri, 2004)

Synonyms
- Pseudophoxinus laconicus Kottelat & Barbieri, 2004

Species of fish

The Evrotas minnow (Pelasgus laconicus) is a species of freshwater ray-finned fish belonging to the family Leuciscidae, which includes the daces, Eurasian minnows and related species. It is endemic to Greece.

== Taxonomy ==
The Evrotas minnow was first formally described as Pseudophoxinus laconicusby the ichthyologists Maurice Kottelat and Roberta Barbieri, with its type locality given as Vivari Springs about 2 km (1.2 mi) west of Sellasia off the Sparta to Tripoli road at Kilometre 12 37°10'05"N, 22°22'27"E, Laconia, Peloponnese, Greece. This species is now classified in the genus Pelasgus within the subfamily Leuciscinae of the family Leuciscidae.

== Etymology ==
The Evrotas minnow belongs to the genus Pelasgus. This name is derived from the Pelasgians, the ancient people who lived around the Aegean Sea before the arrival of the Indo-European speaking ancestors of the Greeks in the second millennium B.C.E., and alludes to the fishes in this genus all being found in the Balkans. The specific name, laconicus, means "belonging to Laconia", the district where the type locality is located.

== Description ==
The Evrotas minnow has 10 soft rays in its dorsal fin and 8 in its anal fin, of which 6 1/2 are branched. There are between 44 and 48 scales in the lateral line, of which up to 8 are pored. The head and snout are stout blunt and the body is elongated. The overall colour is dark brown with many melanophores along the sides, roughly arranged into small spots, and a midlateral stripe with blurred edges. This species has a maximum published standard length of 4.7 cm (1.9 in).

== Distribution and habitat ==
The Evrotas minnow is endemic to Greece, where it is restricted to the Evrotas River, including the Vassilopotomas River at its delta and the adjacent Alpheios in the southern Pelopponese. This fish inhabits springs and spring-fed creeks as well as the mainstreams of Evrotas and the upper Alpheios in shallow areas, with little or no current, near to the shore, beneath overhanging roots and within dense vegetation.

== Conservation ==
The Evrotas minnow is classified as Endangered by the International Union for Conservation of Nature. It is threatened by pollution from agriculture and mining, as well as water abstraction, which has caused the Evrotas to become artificially intermittent when it was a perennial river before.
