= Simav barbel =

Conservation status
- Near Threatened (IUCN 3.1)

Scientific classification
- Kingdom: Animalia
- Phylum: Chordata
- Class: Actinopterygii
- Order: Cypriniformes
- Family: Cyprinidae
- Subfamily: Barbinae
- Genus: Barbus
- Species: B. niluferensis

Binomial name
- Barbus niluferensis Turan, Kottelat & Ekmekçi, 2009

Species of fish

The Simav barbel (Barbus niluferensis) is a species of ray-finned fish in the genus Barbus, it is found in the southern Marmora basin in Turkey, in the Simav and Gönen drainage systems.
