= East African red-finned barb =

Conservation status
- Least Concern (IUCN 3.1)

Scientific classification
- Kingdom: Animalia
- Phylum: Chordata
- Class: Actinopterygii
- Order: Cypriniformes
- Family: Cyprinidae
- Subfamily: Smiliogastrinae
- Genus: Enteromius
- Species: E. apleurogramma

Binomial name
- Enteromius apleurogramma (Boulenger, 1911

Synonyms
- Barbus apleurogramma Boulenger, 1911; Barbus aphantogramma Regan, 1920; Barbus schneenmanni Klausewitz, 1957; Barbus lapsus Banister, 1973; Barbus amboseli Banister, 1980

Species of fish

The East African red-finned barb (Enteromius apleurogramma) is a species of ray-finned fish in the family Cyprinidae.

It is found in Burundi, Kenya, Rwanda, and Tanzania.

Its natural habitats are rivers, swamps, freshwater lakes, freshwater marshes, and inland deltas.

It is not considered a threatened species by the IUCN.
