= Prespa minnow =

Conservation status
- Endangered (IUCN 3.1)

Scientific classification
- Kingdom: Animalia
- Phylum: Chordata
- Class: Actinopterygii
- Order: Cypriniformes
- Family: Leuciscidae
- Subfamily: Leuciscinae
- Genus: Pelasgus
- Species: P. prespensis

Binomial name
- Pelasgus prespensis (S. L. Karaman, 1924)

Synonyms
- Paraphoxinus epiroticus f. prespensis S. L. Karaman, 1924; Phoxinellus prespensis ( S. L. Karaman, 1924); Pseudophoxinus prespensis ( S. L. Karaman, 1924)

Species of fish

The Prespa minnow (Pelasgus prespensis) is a species of freshwater ray-finned fish belonging to the family Leuciscidae, which includes the daces, Eurasian minnows and related species. It is endemic to the Prespa drainage system in the Western Balkans.

== Taxonomy ==
The Prespa minnow was first formally described as Paraphoxinus minutus by the Yugoslav ichthyologist Stanko Karaman, with its type locality given as Lake Prespa and its tributaries in Macedonia. This species is now classified in the genus Pelasgus within the subfamily Leuciscinae of the family Leuciscidae.

== Etymology ==
The Prespa minnow belongs to the genus Pelasgus. This name is derived from the Pelasgians, the ancient people who lived around the Aegean Sea before the arrival of the Indo-European speaking ancestors of the Greeks in the second millennium B.C.E., and alludes to the fishes in this genus all being found in the Balkans. The specific name, prespensis, means "of Prespa", a reference to the type locality.

== Description ==
The prespa minnow is characterised by very small, non-overlapping scales that are deeply embedded in its skin. It is a small freshwater fish with an elongated body and rounded shape. It frequently shows a silvery or grayish colour, darker on the back, with indistinct markings. There are 2 spines and 7 soft rays on the dorsal fin, while the anal fin has 3 spines and 6 soft rays. This species has a maximum published total length of 7.3 cm (2.9 in).

== Distribution and habitat ==
The Prespa minnow is endemic to the Lake Prespa drainage system in Albania, Greece and North Macedonia. It is also present in the Lake Malik basin in the upper Devoll, which they may have colonised through a former canal connecting the Devoll with the Prespa drainage. Within the Prespa lakes the Prespa minnow is found in the littoral zone, commonest in densely vegetated areas. In the Devoll River it is associated with spring-fed wetlands and slow-flowing parts of the river.
