= Economidichthys trichonis =

Conservation status
- Endangered (IUCN 3.1)

Scientific classification
- Kingdom: Animalia
- Phylum: Chordata
- Class: Actinopterygii
- Order: Gobiiformes
- Family: Oxudercidae
- Genus: Economidichthys
- Species: E. trichonis

Binomial name
- Economidichthys trichonis Economidis & Miller, 1990

Species of fish

Economidichthys trichonis, the Trichonis dwarf goby, is a species of goby endemic to Lake Trichonis, an oligotrophic lake in western Greece, where it can be found at depths down to 15 metres (49 ft) in vegetated areas. Males of this species can reach a length of 3 centimetres (1.2 in) TL while females grow to 2.7 centimetres (1.1 in) TL. This species is the smallest freshwater fish in Europe with a mature female measuring only 1.8 centimetres (0.71 in) SL.
