= Thessalian barbel =

Scientific classification
- Domain: Eukaryota
- Kingdom: Animalia
- Phylum: Chordata
- Class: Actinopterygii
- Order: Cypriniformes
- Family: Cyprinidae
- Subfamily: Barbinae
- Genus: Barbus
- Species: B. thessalus

Binomial name
- Barbus thessalus Stephanidis, 1971

Species of fish

Thessalian barbel (Barbus thessalus) is a species of ray-finned fish in the genus Barbus. It is endemic to Greece.
