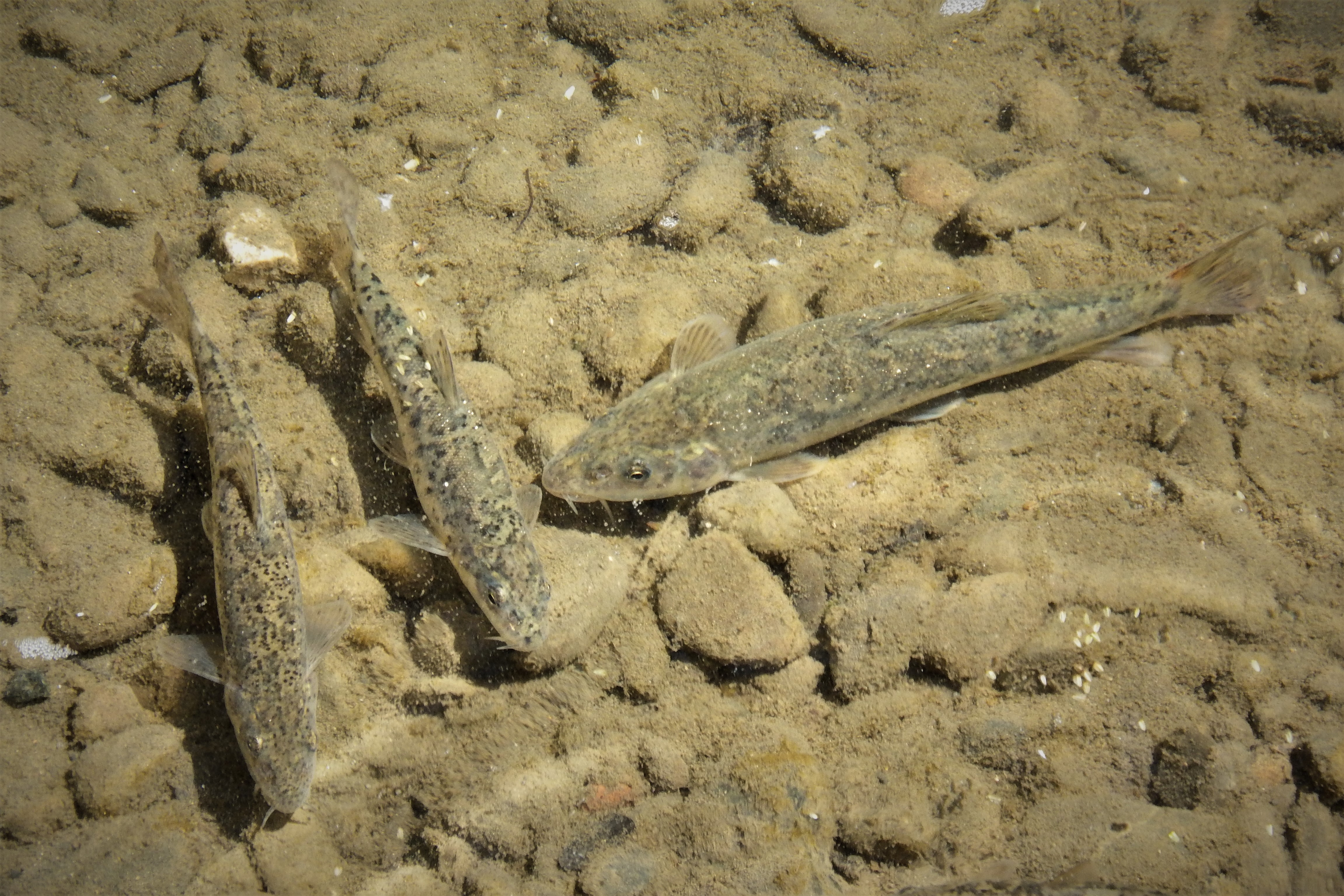
- Barbus sperchiensis, Central Greece

Conservation status
- Near Threatened (IUCN 3.1)

Scientific classification
- Kingdom: Animalia
- Phylum: Chordata
- Class: Actinopterygii
- Order: Cypriniformes
- Family: Cyprinidae
- Subfamily: Barbinae
- Genus: Barbus
- Species: B. sperchiensis

Binomial name
- Barbus sperchiensis Stephanidis, 1950

= Barbus sperchiensis =

Species of fish

Barbus sperchiensis is a disputed species of cyprinid fish in the genus Barbus. It is a freshwater fish endemic to the Spercheios river complex, Central Greece.

It is sometimes included in B. cyclolepis.
