= Barbus carpathicus =

Conservation status
- Least Concern (IUCN 3.1)

Scientific classification
- Kingdom: Animalia
- Phylum: Chordata
- Class: Actinopterygii
- Order: Cypriniformes
- Family: Cyprinidae
- Subfamily: Barbinae
- Genus: Barbus
- Species: B. carpathicus

Binomial name
- Barbus carpathicus Kotlík, Tsigenopoulos, Ráb & Berrebi, 2002

Species of fish

Barbus carpathicus, the Carpathian barbel, is a species of freshwater ray-finned fish belonging to the family Cyprinidae, the family which includes the carps, barbels and related fishes. This fish is found in the drainage system of the Danube in Europe.

== Taxonomy ==
Barbus carpathicus was first formally described in 2007 by Petr Kotlík, Constantinos S. Tsigenopoulos, Petr Ráb and Patrick Berrebi with its type locality given as the Ublianka River, a tributary of Uzh River in the Danube River basin at Ubla in Slovakia at 48°53'N, 22°23'E. The Carpathian barb is a species within the genus Barbus which is the type genus of the subfamily Barbinae within the family Cyprinidae.

== Etymology ==
Barbus carpathicus is classified in the genus Barbus, the name of which is the Latin for "beard". The specific name carpathicus means belonging to the Carpathian Mountains, this species is endemic to the northwestern Carpathians.

== Identification ==
Barbus carpathicus is distinguished from other Barbus species in the Danube basis by a combination of the following characteristics: the last unbranched fin ray of the dorsal fin is not well developed, without serration on its rear edge and has segments along its length; the lower lip is thick with a lobe in the middle, there are between 8 and 11 rows of scales between the lateral line and the origin of the dorsal fin and between 8 and 11 between the lateral line and the origin of the pelvic fin; the top of the head is unmarked, there are very few small, or no, spots on the cheek or operculum; the pelvic and pectoral fins are unspotted with little or no pigment in the rays which do not have any dark barring; the body is largely unmarked with indistinct dots and blotches; the caudal fin is unspotted or has small spots. These characteristics are, however, of little use in distinguishing this species from the Danube barbel (B. balcanicus) and Romanian barbel (B. petenyi) in the field because this species is mainly differentiated by mitochondrial DNA.

== Distribution and habitat ==
Barbus carpathicus is native to eastern Europe where it is found in the Tisza river system in the Danube drainage, the Hron to the Someș riverss, the Upper Vistula drainage as far downstream as the Pilica tributary system. It is also found in the Wierzyca tributary system on the lower Vistula drainage and in the upper Dniester drainage. The Carpathian barbel has been recorded from Hungary, Slovakia, Poland, Romania and Ukraine.It is found in premontane and montane streams and small rivers with gravel bottoms where there is a swift to moderate current, in the summer it is commonest in shallow rapids and riffles during summer but moves to deeper spots in the winter.
