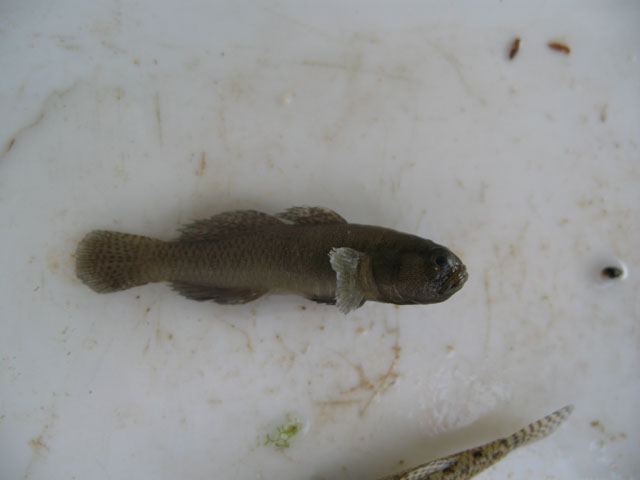

Conservation status
- Near Threatened (IUCN 3.1)

Scientific classification
- Kingdom: Animalia
- Phylum: Chordata
- Class: Actinopterygii
- Order: Gobiiformes
- Family: Oxudercidae
- Genus: Economidichthys
- Species: E. pygmaeus

Binomial name
- Economidichthys pygmaeus (Holly, 1929)

Synonyms
- Gobius pygmaeus Holly, 1929; Pomatoschistus pygmaeus (Holly, 1929); Gobius martensii prevesicus Stephanidis, 1939

= Economidichthys pygmaeus =

Species of fish

Economidichthys pygmaeus, the Western Greece goby, is a species of freshwater goby endemic to western Greece where it is an inhabitant of streams and rivers. It is suspected to also occur in Albania. Males of this species can reach a length of 5.1 centimetres (2.0 in) TL while females can reach a length of 5.4 centimetres (2.1 in) TL.
