= Ankara barbel =

Conservation status
- Least Concern (IUCN 3.1)

Scientific classification
- Kingdom: Animalia
- Phylum: Chordata
- Class: Actinopterygii
- Order: Cypriniformes
- Family: Cyprinidae
- Subfamily: Barbinae
- Genus: Barbus
- Species: B. escherichii

Binomial name
- Barbus escherichii (Steindachner, 1897)

Synonyms
- Luciobarbus escherichii; Barbus lacerta var. escherichii

Species of fish

The Ankara barbel or Sakarya barbel (Barbus escherichii) is a species of cyprinid fish endemic to freshwater habitats in Turkey, where it occurs in the Sakarya drainage in the Asian part of the country.
