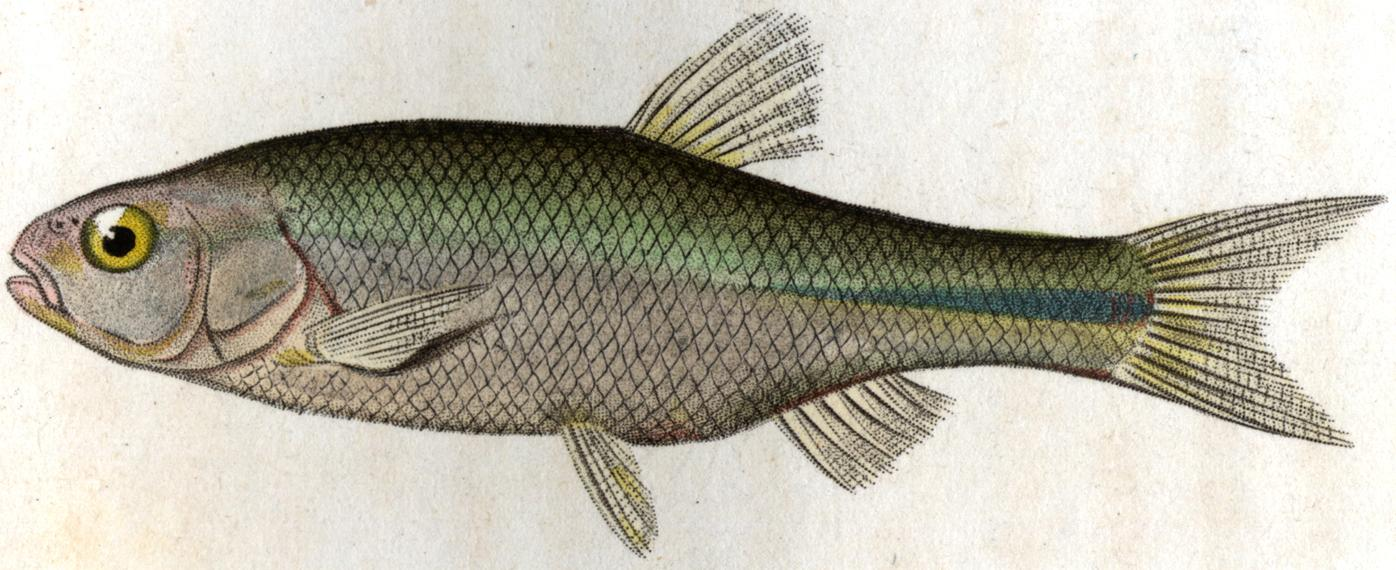

Conservation status
- Near Threatened (IUCN 3.1)

Scientific classification
- Kingdom: Animalia
- Phylum: Chordata
- Class: Actinopterygii
- Order: Cypriniformes
- Family: Leuciscidae
- Subfamily: Leuciscinae
- Genus: Pelasgus
- Species: P. stymphalicus

Binomial name
- Pelasgus stymphalicus (Valenciennes, 1844)

Synonyms
- Leuciscus stymphalicus Valenciennes, 1844; Pseudophoxinus stymphalicus (Valenciennes, 1844); Phoxinellus stymphalicus (Valenciennnes, 1844)

= Pelasgus stymphalicus =

Species of fish

Pelasgus stymphalicus, also known as the dáska or stymphalia minnow, is a species of freshwater ray-finned fish belonging to the family Leuciscidae, which includes the daces, Eurasian minnows and related species. It is endemic to Greece.

== Taxonomy ==
Pelasgus stymphalicus was first formally described as Leuciscus stymphalicus by the French ichthyologist Achille Valenciennes, with its type locality given as Lake Zarco in Greece. This species is now classified in the genus Pelasgus within the subfamily Leuciscinae of the family Leuciscidae.

== Etymology ==
Pelasgus stymphalicus belongs to the genus Pelasgus. This name is derived from the Pelasgians, the ancient people who lived around the Aegean Sea before the arrival of the Indo-European speaking ancestors of the Greeks in the second millennium B.C.E., and alludes to the fishes in this genus all being found in the Balkans. The specific name, stymphalicus, means "belonging to stymphalis", a reference to the type locality, which is now called Lake Stymphalia, where Heracles killed the stymphalian birds.

== Description ==
Pelasgus stymphalicus is a small fish with a maximum standard length of 12 cm (4.7 in).

== Distribution and habitat ==
Pelasgus stymphalicus is endemic to Greece, where it is found in the northern and western Peloponnese. This species, like other members of its genus, prefers slow-moving to near-stagnant water bodies with abundant aquatic vegetation. These are mostly small streams, spring-fed wetlands and oligotrophic lakes, which can be located at altitudes from sea level to upland plateaus. This species can tolerate salinities of 12–13‰, and can enter brackish water for short periods. It is also able to colonise artificial drainage canals. Some populations live in non perennial streams and small rivers, where they spend the dry periods in residual pools or perennial spring-fed stretches.

== Conservation ==
Pelasgus stymphalicus is classified as Near Threatened by the International Union for Conservation of Nature. It is threatened by habitat degradation, water abstraction, pollution and non-native invasive fishes. The type locality, Lake Stymphalia, dried up completely between 1989 and 1991.
