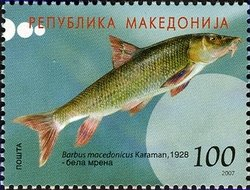

Conservation status
- Least Concern (IUCN 3.1)

Scientific classification
- Kingdom: Animalia
- Phylum: Chordata
- Class: Actinopterygii
- Order: Cypriniformes
- Family: Cyprinidae
- Subfamily: Barbinae
- Genus: Barbus
- Species: B. macedonicus

Binomial name
- Barbus macedonicus S. L. Karaman, 1928

= Barbus macedonicus =

Species of fish

Barbus macedonicus is a species of cyprinid fish.

It is found only in rivers Vardar, Pineios, Haliacmon and Loudias in northern Greece and North Macedonia.

It is threatened by habitat loss, water extraction, pollution and overfishing. Greece has a general fishing law but it is not enforced.
