= Marathon minnow =

Conservation status
- Near Threatened (IUCN 3.1)

Scientific classification
- Kingdom: Animalia
- Phylum: Chordata
- Class: Actinopterygii
- Order: Cypriniformes
- Family: Leuciscidae
- Subfamily: Leuciscinae
- Genus: Pelasgus
- Species: P. marathonicus

Binomial name
- Pelasgus marathonicus Vinciguerra, 1921

Synonyms
- Leucaspius marathonicus Vinciguerra, 1921; Pseudophoxinus marathonicus (Vinciguerra, 1921)

Species of fish

The Marathon minnow (Pelasgus marathonicus) is a species of freshwater ray-finned fish belonging to the family Leuciscidae, which includes the daces, Eurasian minnows and related species. It is endemic to Greece.

== Description ==
It is a small fish with a total length of 3–7 cm (1.2–2.8 in). The lateral line has around 40 scales which run from the angle of the bladder slit to the base of the tail, only the first 8-12 of these scales are perforated, forming the true lateral line. The dorsal fin has 3 simple and 7-8 branching rays. The tail is forked. The colour of the body is greyish-brown, pale on the ventral side with a narrow, longitudinal black band on the flanks.

== Distribution ==
The Marathon minnow is endemic to Greece where it can be found in the drainages of the Spercheios and Boeotian Kifissos Rivers and on the Marathon Plain. It had been recorded from the Athenian Kifissos but not since 1971 but it was rediscovered there in 2013.

== Habitat and ecology ==
The Marathon minnow is found in Springs, swamps, canals; normally among vegetation or under banks or in tree roots.

It lives up to two years. Spawns in May–September and is a fractional spawner like other minnows in the genus Pelasgus. It feeds on a wide variety of aquatic invertebrates, algae and detritus.

== Conservation ==
The population in the Marathon area has been seriously affected by drainage for agriculture while other threats include Water abstraction, drought, agricultural pollution and introduced species such as the rainbow trout (Oncorhynchus mykiss) and the mosquito-fish (Gambusia holbrooki), The habitat of this species should continue to be monitored, the spread of Gambusia halted using biological control and populations of Marathon minnow should be reinforced using captively bred fish. A major publicity campaign for schools and environmental agencies to raise public awareness has been suggested. The Marathon minnow is considered as Endangered in Greece but the IUCN class it as Near Threatened.
