= Briána =

Conservation status
- Least Concern (IUCN 3.1)

Scientific classification
- Kingdom: Animalia
- Phylum: Chordata
- Class: Actinopterygii
- Order: Cypriniformes
- Family: Cyprinidae
- Subfamily: Barbinae
- Genus: Barbus
- Species: B. prespensis

Binomial name
- Barbus prespensis S. L. Karaman, 1924

Species of fish

The Briána (Barbus prespensis) is a species of cyprinid fish.

It is found in Albania, Greece, and North Macedonia.

Its natural habitats are intermittent rivers and freshwater lakes. It is threatened by habitat loss.
