= Barbus strumicae =

Conservation status
- Least Concern (IUCN 3.1)

Scientific classification
- Domain: Eukaryota
- Kingdom: Animalia
- Phylum: Chordata
- Class: Actinopterygii
- Order: Cypriniformes
- Family: Cyprinidae
- Subfamily: Barbinae
- Genus: Barbus
- Species: B. strumicae

Binomial name
- Barbus strumicae S. L. Karaman, 1955

Species of fish

Barbus strumicae is a disputed species of European cyprinid freshwater fish. It is found in Greece, Macedonia, and Bulgaria, in drainages of the Aegean Sea basin.

But it is often included in B. cyclolepis.
