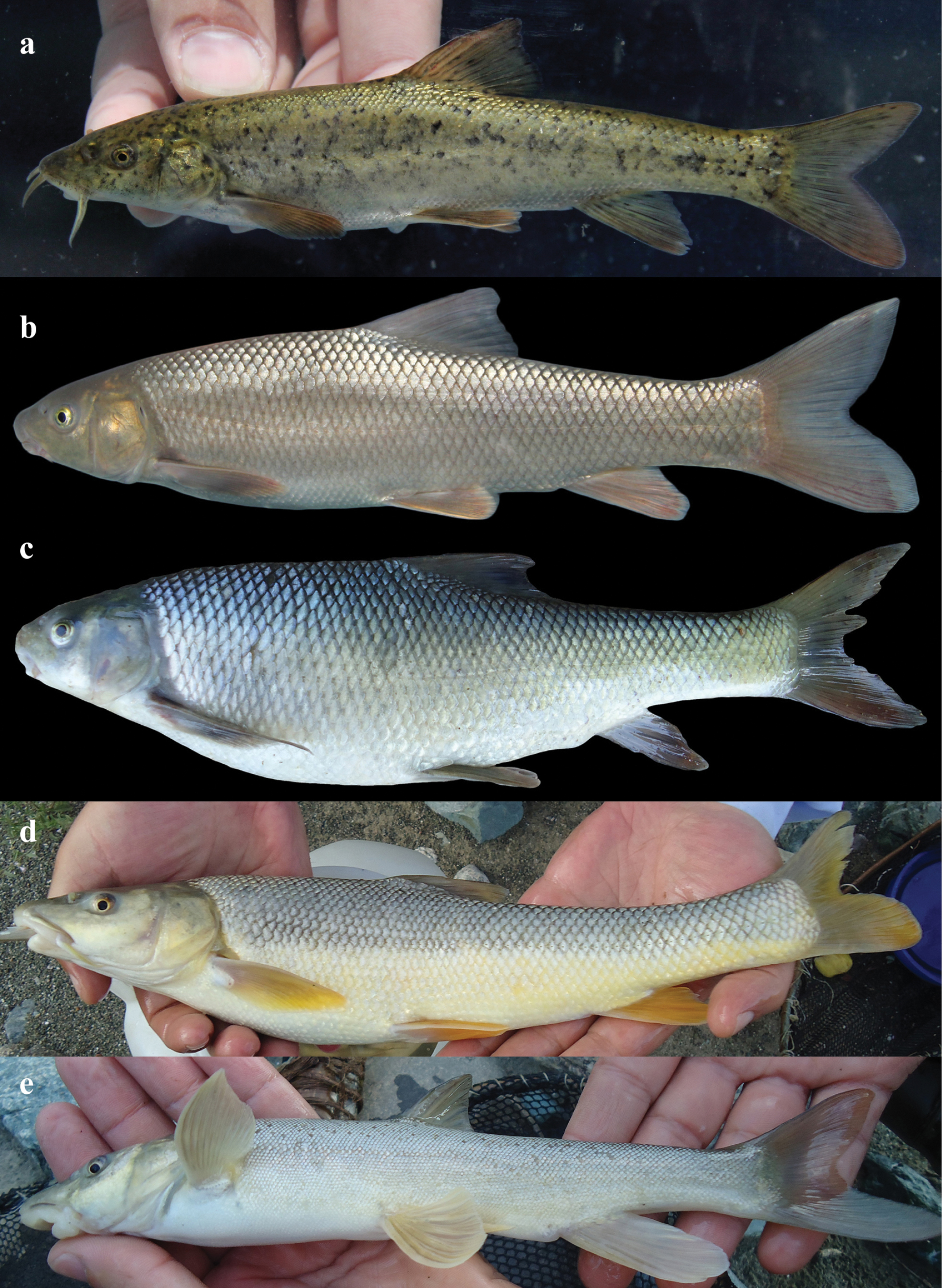
- Barbus cyri at the top (a)

Scientific classification
- Domain: Eukaryota
- Kingdom: Animalia
- Phylum: Chordata
- Class: Actinopterygii
- Order: Cypriniformes
- Family: Cyprinidae
- Subfamily: Barbinae
- Genus: Barbus
- Species: B. cyri

Binomial name
- Barbus cyri De Filippi, 1865

Synonyms
- Barbus angustatus Kamensky, 1899; Barbus armenicus Kamensky, 1899; Barbus bortschalinicus Kamensky, 1899; Barbus caucasicus Kessler, 1877; Barbus cyclolepis cyri De Filippi, 1865; Barbus cyri var. chaldanica Kamensky, 1899; Barbus goktschaicus Kessler, 1877; Barbus lacerta cyri De Filippi, 1865; Barbus sursunicus Kamensky, 1899

= Barbus cyri =

Species of fish

Barbus cyri, the Kura barbel, is a species of freshwater cyprinid fish from the Near East region.

The specific epithet cyri is from the Latin Cyrus for the Kura River in Georgia, which is the type locality.

After synonymisation with the Gokcha barbel, it follows that this species is also found in Lake Sevan.
