= Western Balkan barbel =

Conservation status
- Near Threatened (IUCN 3.1)

Scientific classification
- Kingdom: Animalia
- Phylum: Chordata
- Class: Actinopterygii
- Order: Cypriniformes
- Family: Cyprinidae
- Subfamily: Barbinae
- Genus: Barbus
- Species: B. rebeli

Binomial name
- Barbus rebeli Koller, 1926

Species of fish

The western Balkan barbel (Barbus rebeli) is a species of ray-finned fish in the family Cyprinidae. It is found from the Drin to the Vjosa River.
