= Evia barbel =

Conservation status
- Endangered (IUCN 3.1)

Scientific classification
- Kingdom: Animalia
- Phylum: Chordata
- Class: Actinopterygii
- Division: Teleostei
- Order: Cypriniformes
- Family: Cyprinidae
- Genus: Barbus
- Species: B. euboicus

Binomial name
- Barbus euboicus Stephanidis, 1950

Species of fish

The Evia barbel or petropsaro (Barbus euboicus), is a species of freshwater fish in the family Cyprinidae found only in Greece. It is endemic to the Euboea Island and they're now restricted to a single stream, Manikiotikos, in the southern part of the island. During the dry season it may be found just in a few intermittent pools. It is threatened by habitat loss and considered Endangered.
