= Pelasgus epiroticus =

Conservation status
- Critically endangered, possibly extinct (IUCN 3.1)

Scientific classification
- Kingdom: Animalia
- Phylum: Chordata
- Class: Actinopterygii
- Order: Cypriniformes
- Family: Leuciscidae
- Subfamily: Leuciscinae
- Genus: Pelasgus
- Species: P. epiroticus

Binomial name
- Pelasgus epiroticus (Steindachner, 1895)

Synonyms
- Paraphoxinus epiroticus Steindachner, 1895; Phoxinellus epiroticus (Steindachner, 1895)

Species of Greek freshwater minnow

Pelasgus epiroticus, the Epirote minnow or tsima, is a species of freshwater ray-finned fish belonging to the family Leuciscidae, which includes the daces, Eurasian minnows and related species. It is endemic to Lake Pamvotis in Greece. Due to the restricted range of the species as well as the significant loss its population has suffered since the early 1990s, it has been assessed as critically endangered, possibly extinct by the International Union for Conservation of Nature (IUCN).

== Taxonomy ==
Pelasgus epiroticus was first formally described as Paraphoxinus epiroticus in 1895 by the Austrian ichthyologist Franz Steindachner, with the type locality given as "See von Janina und Fluss Luros der in den Golf von Arta mündet, in Albanien." This species is now classified in the genus Pelasgus within the subfamily Leuciscinae of the family Leuciscidae.

== Etymology ==
Pelasgus epiroticus belongs to the genus Pelasgus. This name is derived from the Pelasgians, the ancient people who lived around the Aegean Sea before the arrival of the Indo-European speaking ancestors of the Greeks in the second millennium B.C.E., and alludes to the fishes in this genus all being found in the Balkans. The specific name, epiroticus, means "belonging to Epirus", the historical region of northwestern Greece and southern Albania. This fish was described from Albania, but it is now known only from Lake Pamvotis in Greek Epirus.

== Distribution and habitat ==
Pelasgus epiroticus is known only from Lake Pamvotis in Epirus, northwestern Greece, where it was found in stagnant or slow moving water with abundant aquatic vegetation.

== Conservation ==
Pelasgus epiroticus is classified as Critically endangered, Possibly extinct by the International Union for Conservation of Nature. None have been recorded from Lake Pamvotis since 1993. It is thought that the decline in the population was caused by the deterioration of water quality in the lake. Due to agriculture and urbanisation, the lake has become highly eutrophic, even hypertrophic in the summer, and is subject to blooms of toxic blue green algae. Invavsive non-native fish species have also been introduced to the lake.
