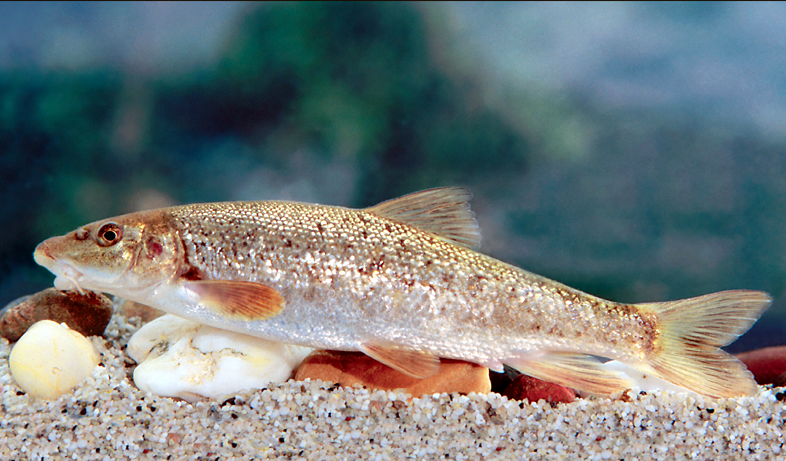

Conservation status
- Least Concern (IUCN 3.1)

Scientific classification
- Kingdom: Animalia
- Phylum: Chordata
- Class: Actinopterygii
- Division: Teleostei
- Order: Cypriniformes
- Family: Cyprinidae
- Subfamily: Barbinae
- Genus: Barbus
- Species: B. petenyi

Binomial name
- Barbus petenyi Heckel, 1852

= Romanian barbel =

Species of fish

The Romanian barbel (Barbus petenyi) is a species of ray-finned fish in the genus Barbus. It occurs in the lower Danube basin of Bulgaria and Romania, as well as in several rivers of Bulgaria flowing into the Black Sea, such as Kamchiya. The species is named after János Salamon Petényi.

Males can reach 25 cm in length.

== Footnotes ==
- Froese, Rainer; Pauly, Daniel (eds.). "Barbus petenyi". FishBase.
