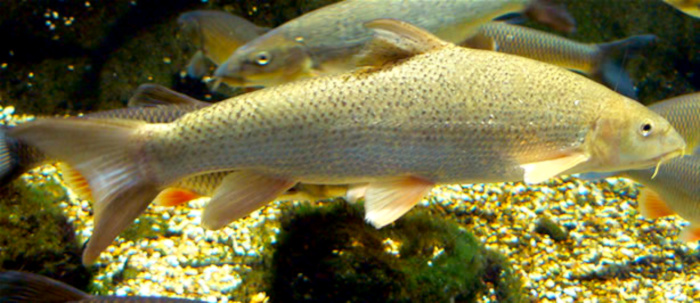

Conservation status
- Least Concern (IUCN 3.1)

Scientific classification
- Kingdom: Animalia
- Phylum: Chordata
- Class: Actinopterygii
- Division: Teleostei
- Order: Cypriniformes
- Family: Cyprinidae
- Subfamily: Barbinae
- Genus: Barbus
- Species: B. barbus

Binomial name
- Barbus barbus (Linnaeus, 1758)

Synonyms
- Cyprinus barbus Linnaeus, 1758; Barbus vulgaris Fleming, 1828; Barbus fluviatilis Fitzinger, 1832; Barbus communis Perty, 1832; Barbus mayori Valenciennes, 1842; Barbus microphthalmus Bonaparte, 1846

= Common barbel =

Species of fish

The common barbel (Barbus barbus) is a species of freshwater fish belonging to the family Cyprinidae. It shares the common name 'barbel' with its many relatives in the genus Barbus, of which it is the type species. In Great Britain it is usually referred to simply as the barbel; similar names are used elsewhere in Europe, such as barbeau in France and flodbarb in Sweden. The name derives from the four whiskerlike structures located at the corners of the fish's mouth, which it uses to locate food.

== Distribution and habitat ==
B. barbus is native throughout northern and eastern Europe, ranging north and east from the Pyrénées and Alps to Lithuania, Russia and the northern Black Sea basin. It is an adaptable fish which transplants well between waterways, and has become established as an introduced species in several countries including Scotland, Morocco and Italy. Although barbel are native to eastern flowing rivers in England between the Thames and Great Ouse they have historically been translocated to western flowing rivers, such as the River Severn. Its favoured habitats are the so-called barbel zones in fast-flowing rivers with gravel or stone bottoms, although it regularly occurs in slower rivers and has been successfully stocked in still waters. Barbel in the River Trent are also artificially stocked.

Barbel are very abundant in some rivers, often seen in large shoals on rivers such as the Wye. Izaak Walton reported that there were once so many barbel in the Danube that they could be caught by hand, 'eight or ten load at a time' .

== Ecology ==
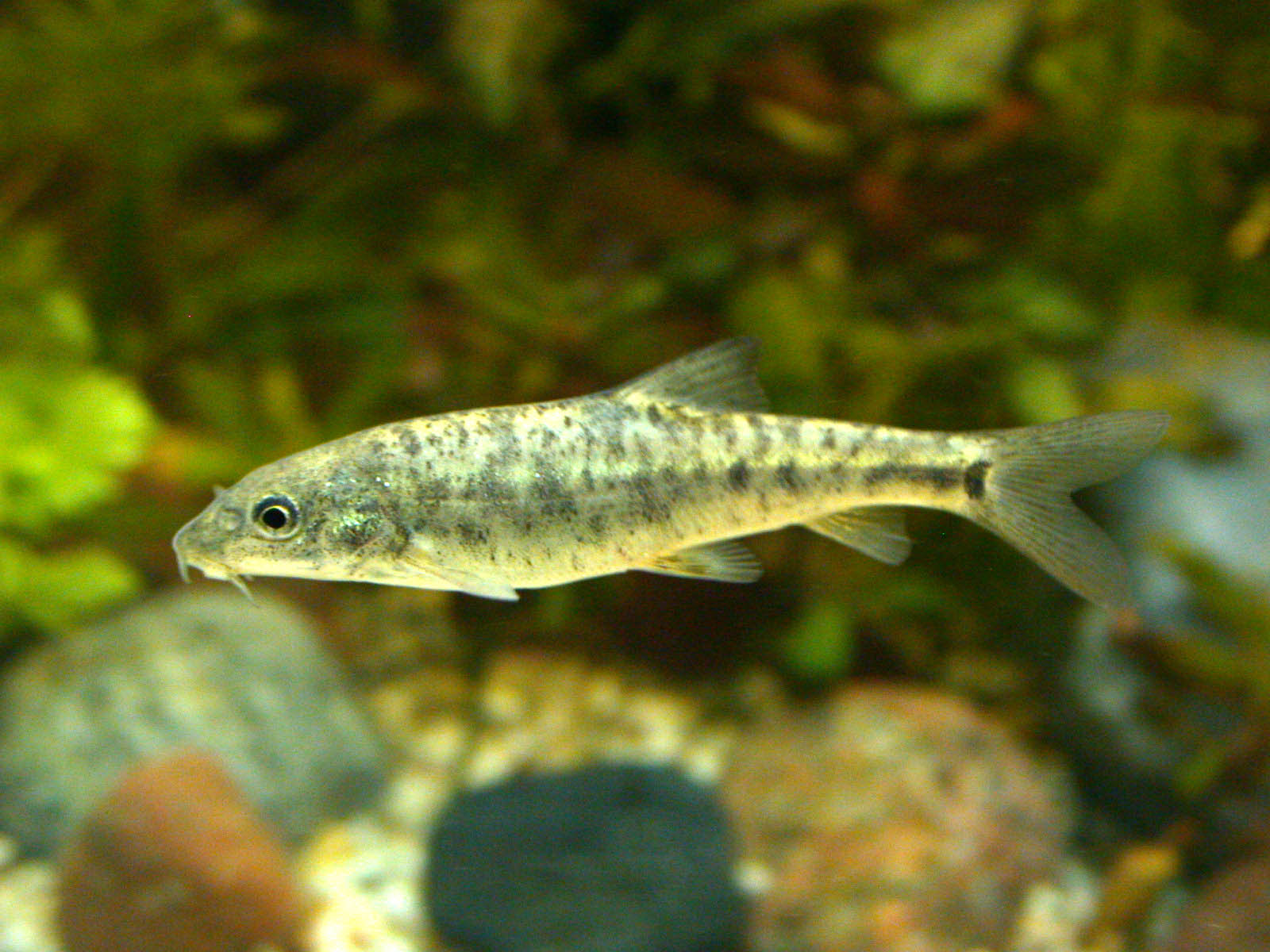
Juvenile barbel

Adult B. barbus specimens can reach 1.2 m (4 ft) in length and 12 kg (26 lb) in weight, although it is typically found at smaller sizes (50–100 cm length, weight 1–3 kg). Adult barbel can live to over 20 years of age. Their sloping foreheads, flattened undersides, slender bodies and horizontally oriented pectoral fins are all adaptations for their life in swift, deep rivers, helping to keep them close to the riverbed in very strong flows. Juvenile fish are usually grey and mottled in appearance; adults are typically dark brown, bronze or grey in colour with a pale underside, with distinctively reddish or orange-tinged fins. The lobes of the tail are asymmetrical, the lower lobe being rounded and slightly shorter than the pointed upper lobe.

Barbel are active fish and often travel long distances in quite short time periods. Individuals can move between 16 and 68 km in a year, with mean (average) daily movement between 26 and 139 m. Adults commonly feed at night, although they may feed during the daytime in the safety of deeper water or near bankside cover and underwater obstructions. Their underslung mouths make them especially well adapted for feeding on benthic organisms, including crustaceans, insect larvae and mollusks, which they root out from the gravel and stones of the riverbed. Barbel diets change as the fish develop from fry to juveniles and then to adults. Diatoms that cover rocks and the larvae of non-biting midges (Chironomidae) are particularly important foods for young fish.

=== Breeding ===
Males become mature after three to four years, females after five to eight years. Spawning occurs between May and late June on most rivers, when groups of males assemble in shallow water in pursuit of mates. Upstream migration to reach spawning grounds typically occurs between March and May, depending on water temperature. Females produce between 8,000 and 12,000 eggs per kilogram of body weight, which are fertilised by males as they are released and deposited in shallow excavations in the gravel of the riverbed. Barbel bury their eggs below the gravel, creating redd-like pit and tailspill structures. High amounts of fine sediment can be detrimental to the eggs and larvae of barbel, with emergence being delayed when sand content was above 30%. Barbel can spawn multiple times in captivity and there is also evidence for multiple spawning either of individuals or across the population, in wild rivers.

=== Parasites ===
Parasites of B. barbus include Aspidogaster limacoides, a trematode flatworm; Eustrongylides sp., a nematode; and Pomphorhynchus laevis, an acanthocephalan worm.

== As food ==
The Barbel is a swete fysshe, but it is a quasy meete and perilous for mannys body

Many authors have noted the highly toxic nature of barbel roe when eaten by humans, including Dame Juliana Berners and Charles David Badham. Badham relates the experience of Italian physician Antonio Gazius, who, he says, "took two boluses, and thus describes his sensations: 'At first I felt no inconvenience, but some hours having elapsed, I began to be disagreeably affected, and as my stomach swelled, and could not be brought down again by anise or carminatives, I was soon in a state of great depression and distress.' His countenance was pallid, like a man in a swoon, deadly coldness ensued, violent cholera and vomiting came after until the roe was passed, and then he became all right." The use of barbel roe as a poison is mentioned in Nostradamus Les Prophéties, century VII, 24 :

He who was buried will come out of the tomb,
he will make the strong one out of the bridge to be bound with chains.
Poisoned with the roe of a barbel,
the great one from Lorraine by the Marquis du Pont.

Despite the risks associated with eating barbel roe, several notable cookery authors have included recipes for barbel in their books. Mrs Beeton, for example, writes that they are in season in the winter months, and suggests simmering them with port and herbs. Also, in The Illustrated London Cookery Book by Frederick Bishop.

== Recreational importance ==
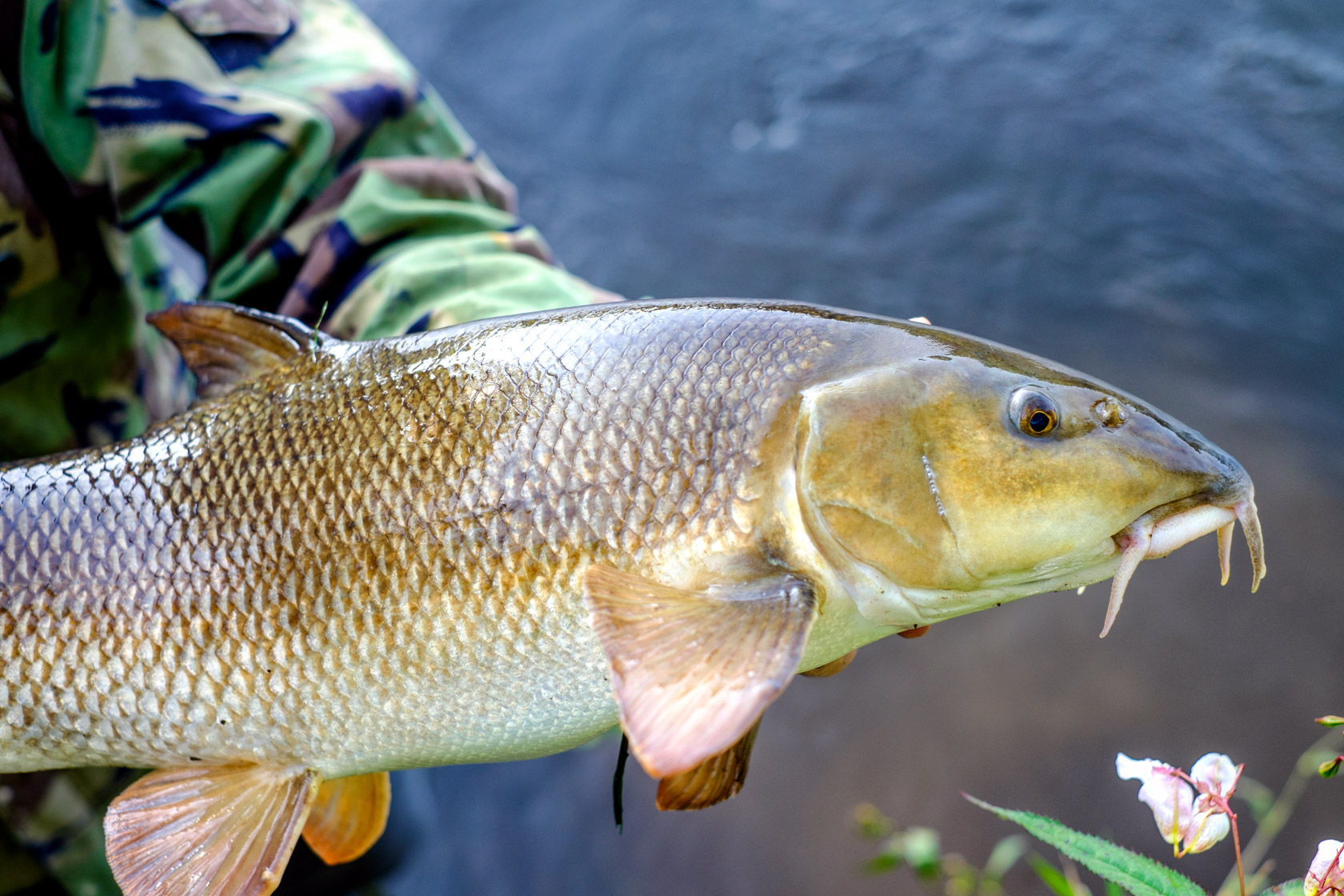
A specimen barbel from the River Wye, England.

The common barbel is a popular sport fish throughout its range, long prized by anglers for its power and stamina. Izaak Walton noted that "he will often break both rod and line if he proves to be a big one ... the Barbel affords an angler choice sport, being a lusty and a cunning fish; so lusty and cunning as to endanger the breaking of the angler's line, by running his head forcibly towards any covert, or hole, or bank, and then striking at the line, to break it off, with his tail".

Barbel fishing is especially popular in the UK, where it reaches a weight of over 9 kg (20 lb). A fish of more than 4.5 kg (10 lb) is considered to be of specimen size. Famous UK barbel rivers include the Hampshire Avon, Dorset Stour, Trent, Kennet, Wye, River Severn at Bewdley, River Loddon near Reading and Great Ouse. Several angling societies exist in the UK which specifically promote the pursuit and conservation of the species, including the Barbel Society and the Barbel Catchers Club. Barbel conservation is important, for although populations appear robust in some larger river systems, localised populations can be vulnerable to environmental factors. For example, the relatively small River Wensum in the county of Norfolk was of national importance to barbel anglers from the 1970s until the early 2000s, at one time producing the British record fish. But in recent years the reintroduction of otters in the river catchment (together with siltation of spawning gravels) has had a devastating effect on the barbel population as they are easy to catch in the shallow, clear river. Now only a fragmented population remains, and barbel may be on their way to local extinction.

=== Fishing for barbel ===
Baits for catching barbel vary widely according to local practices and conditions. In the UK, popular baits include tinned luncheon meat, fishmeal-based pellets, hemp seed, maggots, and boilies. In areas with high angling activity fishmeal-based pellets could constitute up to 71% of the barbel diet. In France, many anglers still use natural baits, especially caddis larvae, which they collect from the stones and gravel near the fish's feeding areas. In Poland, they are often targeted by fly-fishing.

Barbel are often stocked into still waters, but are predominantly a river-dwelling fish and are sought by many anglers. They may not be the most elusive fish in the river; in the right conditions they are fairly easy to catch. They are hardy fish who will fight right until the landing net is slipped under them. Despite this hardy nature in the water they do not cope well out of the water, and must be returned safely and quickly. It is good practice to support the fish in the water until it is fully recovered and swims away on its own.

The current British barbel record of 22 lb 0 oz (9.98 kg) was landed by James Crosby from the River Lea at the Kings Weir fishery in November 2024.
