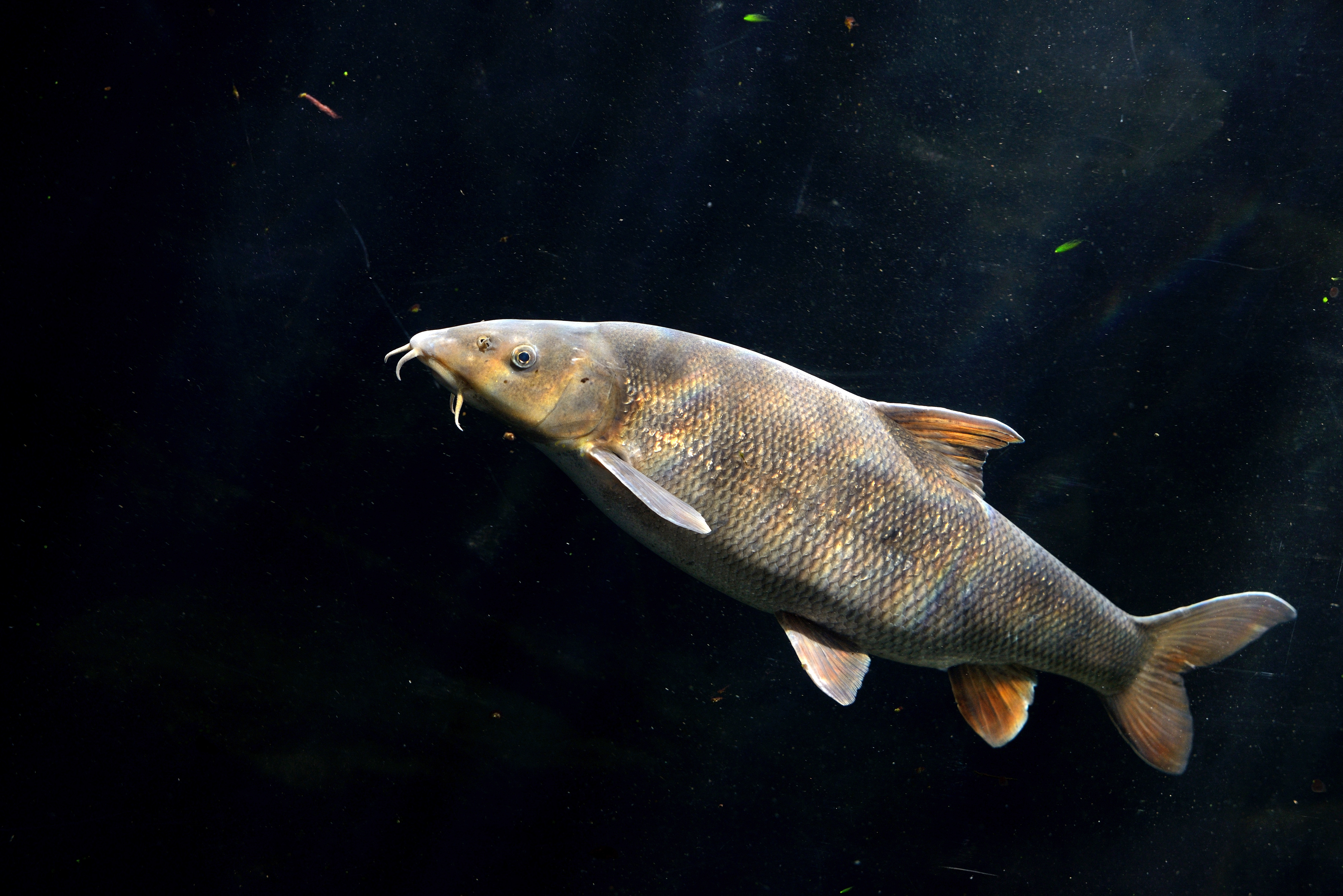
- Barbus barbus
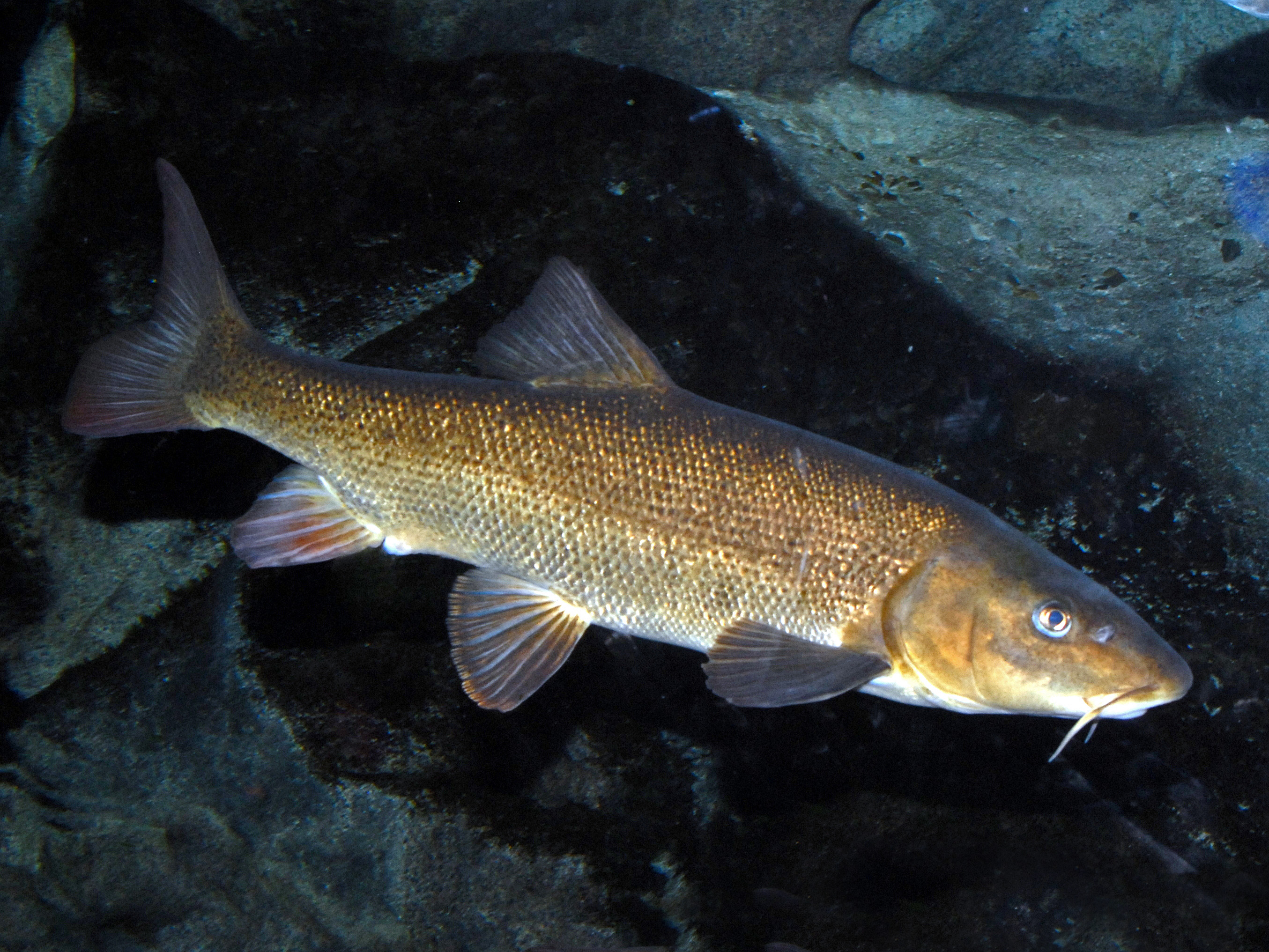
- Barbus plebejus

Scientific classification
- Kingdom: Animalia
- Phylum: Chordata
- Class: Actinopterygii
- Division: Teleostei
- Order: Cypriniformes
- Family: Cyprinidae
- Subfamily: Barbinae
- Genus: Barbus; Daudin, 1805

Type species
- Cyprinus barbus Linnaeus, 1758

= Barbus =

Genus of fishes

Barbus is a genus of ray-finned fish in the family Cyprinidae. The type species of Barbus is the common barbel, first described as Cyprinus barbus and now named Barbus barbus. Barbus is the namesake genus of the subfamily Barbinae, but given their relationships, that taxon is better included in the Cyprininae at least for the largest part (including the type species of Barbus).

== Description and uses ==
Their common names – barbs and barbels – refer to the fact that most members of the genera have a pair of barbels on their mouths, which they can use to search for food at the bottom of the water.

Barbels are often fished for food; in some locations they are of commercial significance. The roe of barbels is poisonous, however. The large Barbus barbs are also often eaten in their native range.

The smaller barbs are in some cases traded as aquarium fish. Some are quite significant, but as a whole, the genus is not yet as well represented in aquaria as the Southeast Asian Puntius.

== Systematics and taxonomy ==
Barbus has a long history as a "wastebasket taxon". Historically, most fish commonly known as "barbs" were usually placed here by default. More recently, many "barbs" have been reclassified into genera such as Arabibarbus, Barbichthys, Barbodes, Barboides, Barbonymus, Barbopsis, Caecobarbus, Capoeta, Carasobarbus, Clypeobarbus, Enteromius, Hypselobarbus, Hypsibarbus, Labeobarbus, Leptobarbus, Luciobarbus, Mesopotamichthys, Poropuntius, Probarbus, Pseudobarbus, Puntioplites and Puntius.

Thus, Barbus is for the time being restricted to typical barbels, and only contains fishes from Africa and Europe, as well as adjacent Asia. However, the genus even in the reduced version is probably paraphyletic, and many African species (particularly the small ones) do not seem to belong here, either. Eventually, Barbus is likely to be restricted to the group around B. barbus – the large European to Ponto-Caspian species commonly known as "barbels". Luciobarbus and particularly Messinobarbus are highly similar and might better be included in Barbus again. They all seem to be close relatives – perhaps the closest living relatives – of Aulopyge huegelii. Carasobarbus and Labeobarbus are probably closely related to this group, too, and some large hexaploid barbs (e.g. L. reinii) may well belong in Labeobarbus.

The small barbs from Africa, by contrast, are quite distinct. They might even warrant establishment of a new subfamily – in particular if the Labeoninae are not included in the Cyprininae – as they seem to be as distinct from barbels and typical carps, as these are from the garras (Garra, which are part of the disputed Labeoninae), rendering the old "Barbinae" paraphyletic. Within the small African barbs, several lineages can be recognized. These are mostly diploid; a tetraploid group largely restricted to southern Africa is very close to Pseudobarbus and might even be included therein. In particular, the group called "redfins" may well be monophyletic and belong in Pseudobarbus entirely, instead of being split between Pseudobarbus and Barbus.

A molecular phylogeny somewhat illustrative of the problem is Wang et al. (2013).

== Species ==
These are the currently recognized species of this genus:

- Barbus anatolicus Turan, Kaya, Geiger & Freyhof, 2018
- Barbus balcanicus Kotlík, Tsigenopoulos, Ráb & Berrebi, 2002 (Danube barbel)
- Barbus barbus (Linnaeus, 1758) (Common barbel)
- Barbus bergi Chichkoff, 1935 (Bulgarian barbel)
- Barbus biharicus Antal, László & Kotlík, 2016 (Biharian barbel)
- Barbus borysthenicus Dybowski, 1862
- Barbus caninus Bonaparte, 1839 (brook barbel)
- Barbus carpathicus Kotlík, Tsigenopoulos, Ráb & Berrebi, 2002 (Carpathian barbel)
- Barbus ciscaucasicus Kessler, 1877 (Terek barbel)
- Barbus cyclolepis Heckel, 1837
- Barbus cyri De Filippi, 1865 (Kura barbel)
- Barbus ercisianus Karaman, 1971
- Barbus escherichii Steindachner, 1897 (Ankara barbel)
- Barbus euboicus Stephanidis, 1950 (Evia barbel)
- Barbus fucini Costa, 1853
- Barbus haasi Mertens, 1925 (Catalonian barbel)
- Barbus ida Güçlü, Kalayci, Özuluğ, Küçük & Turan, 2021
- Barbus karunensis Khaefi, Esmaeili, Geiger & Eagderi, 2017 (Karun barbel)
- Barbus kubanicus L. S. Berg, 1913 (Kuban barbel)
- Barbus lacerta Heckel, 1843 (lizard barbel)
- Barbus macedonicus Karaman, 1928
- Barbus meridionalis A. Risso, 1827 (Mediterranean barbel)
- Barbus miliaris De Filippi, 1863
- Barbus niluferensis Turan, Kottelat & Ekmekçi, 2009 (Simav barbel)
- Barbus oligolepis Battalgil, 1941 (Marmara barbel)
- Barbus oscensis Rossi & Plazzi, 2023.
- Barbus peloponnesius Valenciennes, 1842
- Barbus pergamonensis M. S. Karaman, 1971 (Anatolian barbel)
- Barbus petenyi Heckel, 1852 (Romanian barbel)
- Barbus plebejus Bonaparte, 1839 (Italian barbel)
- Barbus prespensis Karaman, 1924
- Barbus rebeli Koller, 1926 (Western Balkan barbel)
- Barbus rionicus Kamensky, 1899
- Barbus samniticus Lorenzoni, Carosi, Quadroni, De Santis, Vanetti, Delmastro & Zaccara, 2021
- Barbus sperchiensis Stephanidis, 1950 (Sperchios barbel)
- Barbus strumicae Karaman, 1955 (Strumica barbel)
- Barbus tauricus Kessler, 1877 (Crimean barbel)
- Barbus thessalus Stephanidis, 1971 (Thessalian barbel)
- Barbus tyberinus Bonaparte, 1839 (Horse barbel)
- Barbus waleckii Rolik, 1970 (Vistula barbel)
- Barbus xanthos Güçlü, Kalayci, Küçük & Turan, 2020

=== Fossil species ===
A fossil species (Barbus megacephalus Günther, 1876) is known from the Paleogene Sipang Fauna of Indonesia., but it probably should be placed in another genus.

== See also ==
- Danionins
