= Permanent Maghreb =

Freshwater ecoregion of North Africa

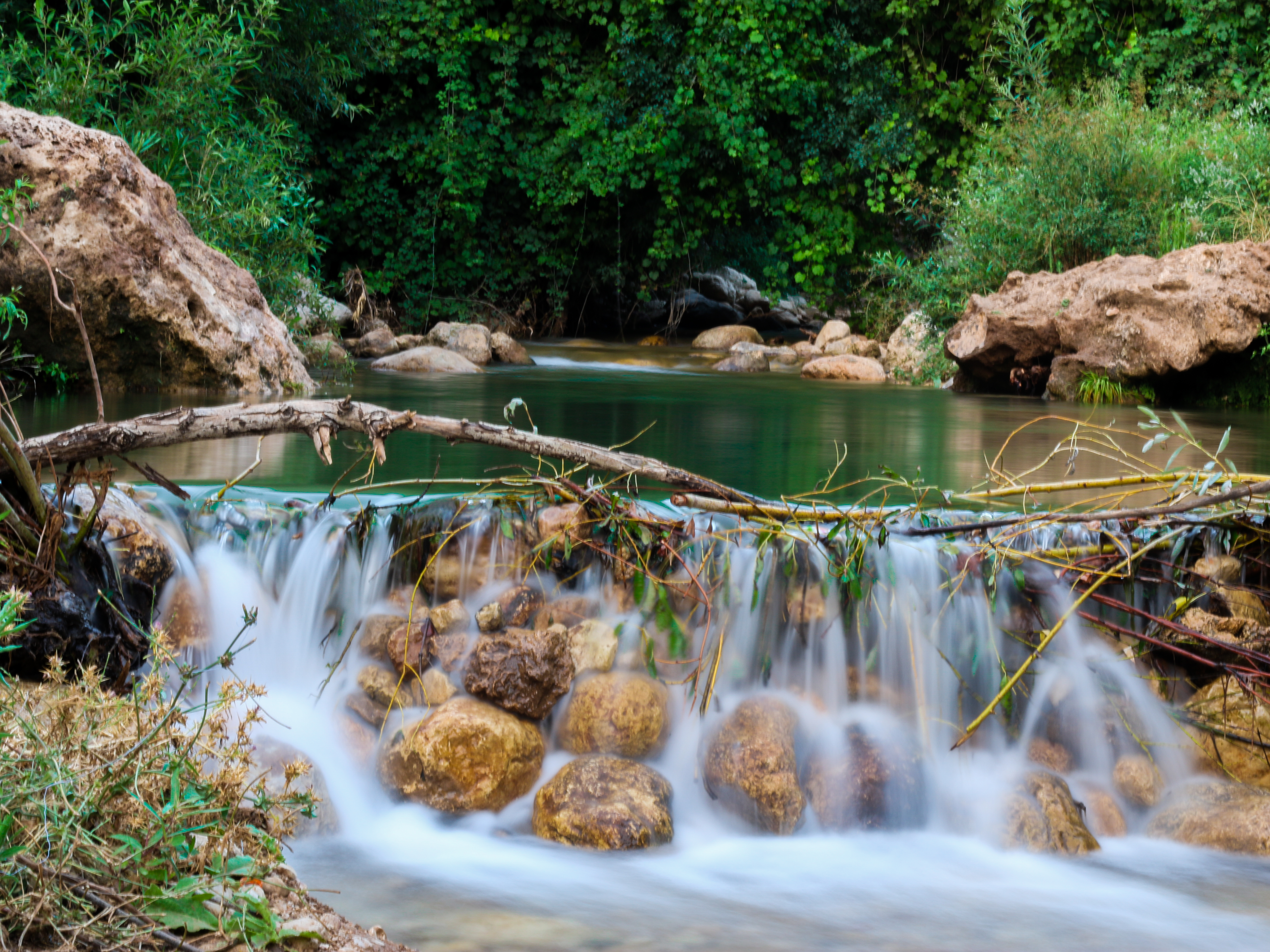
- Cascade in Zaouia d'Ifrane, Morocco

Ecology
- Borders: Temporary Maghreb

Geography
- Area: 950,180 km^{2} (366,870 sq mi)
- Countries: List: Algeria; Morocco; Tunisia; Western Sahara; Mauritania
- Climate type: Mediterranean

The Permanent Maghreb of World Wide Fund for Nature is a freshwater ecoregion of North Africa.

== Geography ==
The Permanent Maghreb ecoregion covers an area of 950,180 square kilometers, and extends across the portions of Algeria, Mauritania, Morocco, Tunisia, and Western Sahara. It occupies the Mediterranean climate region of northern Africa, and is characterized by rivers and streams which flow on the surface year-round. The ecoregion is bounded on the north by the Atlantic Ocean and Mediterranean Sea, and to the south by the Temporary Maghreb freshwater ecoregion, which covers the northern portion of the Sahara and is characterized by temporary or seasonally-flowing rivers and streams.

The WWF divides the ecoregion into two. Atlantic Northwest Africa lies in northwestern Africa, covering most of Morocco and Western Sahara and portions of Mauritania and Algeria. The ecoregion covers the western Atlas Mountains complex, including the Anti-Atlas to the west, the High Atlas, the Middle Atlas further east, and Rif Mountains along the Mediterranean coast. The rivers flow into the Atlantic, or inland into the Sahara. The main streams flowing into the Atlantic are the Sebou, Oum Er-Rbia, Tensift, and Sous.

Mediterranean Northwest Africa lies further east, covering the northern portions of Tunisia and Algeria along with eastern Morocco. The streams originate in the eastern portion of the Atlas Mountains complex, including the Tell Atlas, the Saharan Atlas, and the Aures Mountains. Its principal rivers include the Moulouya, Chelif, and Medjerda, which empty into the Mediterranean Sea.

== Habitats ==
The major habitat types of the ecoregion are Mediterranean systems and temperate coastal rivers. Most of the rivers originate in the Atlas mountains. Rainfall is generally higher in the winter months, and there is regular winter snowfall at higher elevations which creates spring snowmelt. The largest rivers empty into the sea, forming reedy wetlands at river mouths. The Atlantic rivers are generally more species-rich. The streams which flow towards the Sahara mostly empty into chotts, shallow saline lakes which vary seasonally in extent. The streams that flow southward into the Sahara sustain desert aquifers.

== Fauna ==
The freshwater fauna of the Permanent Maghreb shares affinities with of Europe’s Mediterranean freshwater ecoregions. It is home to Africa's only native salmonids and Cobitis maroccana, Africa's only representative of family Cobitidae. Atlantic Northwest Africa has greater affinities with Iberia, while Mediterranean Northwest Africa has some Asiatic species.

Endemic fish species of Atlantic Northwest Africa include Salmo akairos, Salmo pallaryi (now extinct), Cobitis maroccana, and several species of Barbus (B. labiosa, B. magniatlantis, B. ksibi, B. issenensis, B. massaensis, B. nasus, B. harterti, B. paytonii, B. reinii, and two more undescribed species). Near-endemic species include Varicorhinus maroccanus and Barbus pallaryi, which also range into the adjacent Temporary Maghreb. Other fish species include Tilapia zillii, Labeobarbus fritschii, Atherina boyeri, and Alosa alosa.

Endemic fish species of the Mediterranean Northwest Africa ecoregion include Pseudophoxinus callensis, P. punicus, Barbus callensis, B. leptopogon, Tropidophoxinellus chaignoni, and Aphanius apodus. Other fish species include Aphanius fasciatus, Barbus fritschii, Salaria fluviatilis, and Salmo macrostigma.
