= Messinobarbus =

Scientific classification
- Kingdom: Animalia
- Phylum: Chordata
- Class: Actinopterygii
- Order: Cypriniformes
- Family: Cyprinidae
- Genus: Messinobarbus; Bianco, 1998

Type species
- Barbus bocagei

Disputed genus of fish

Messinobarbus is a doubtful genus of the subfamily Barbinae within Cyprinidae.

It was erected by Pier Giorgio Bianco, who also described M. carottae in the same paper in 1998.

== Synonyms ==
- Messinobarbus albanicus, synonym of Luciobarbus albanicus
- Messinobarbus bocagei, synonym of Luciobarbus bocagei
- Messinobarbus carottae, synonym of Barbus carottae
- Messinobarbus comizo, synonym of Luciobarbus comizo
- Messinobarbus graellsii, synonym of Luciobarbus graellsii
- Messinobarbus guiraonis, synonym of Luciobarbus guiraonis
- Messinobarbus haasi, synonym of Barbus haasi
- Messinobarbus microcephalus, synonym of Luciobarbus microcephalus
- Messinobarbus sclateri, synonym of Luciobarbus sclateri
