= Luciobarbus guiraonis =

Conservation status
- Near Threatened (IUCN 3.1)

Scientific classification
- Kingdom: Animalia
- Phylum: Chordata
- Class: Actinopterygii
- Order: Cypriniformes
- Family: Cyprinidae
- Subfamily: Barbinae
- Genus: Luciobarbus
- Species: L. guiraonis

Binomial name
- Luciobarbus guiraonis (Steindachner, 1866)

Synonyms
- Barbus guiraonis Steindachner, 1866 (but see text)

Species of fish

Luciobarbus guiraonis is a ray-finned fish species in the family Cyprinidae. It is here placed in Luciobarbus following the IUCN, but that genus is very closely related to the other typical barbels and perhaps better considered a mere subgenus of Barbus.

This large barbel is endemic to Spain, where it is known as barbo mediterraneo. This literally means "Mediterranean Barbel" in English, but that common name is usually applied to the closely related Barbus meridionalis, of whose scientific name it is an equivalent.

It occurs in rivers, lakes and reservoirs on the Mediterranean side of Spain, from the Mijares's to the Serpis River' drainage basins, and in the drainage basin of the upper Guadiana River.

It is classified as Near Threatened by the IUCN and its numbers will probably decrease by about one-third until 2020. The main cause of its decline is unsustainable use of water resources, such as water pollution, extraction for agriculture and damming. Certain planned damming projects are likely to severely impact the species' stocks. Introduced exotic fishes pose an additional problem.

L. guiraonis is listed in Annex V of the European Union's Habitats Directive to allow its taking from the wild to be legally restricted, and – as Barbus capito, which actually refers to its Central Asian relative, the Bulatmai barbel – as Protected Species in Appendix III of the Convention on the Conservation of European Wildlife and Natural Habitats.

== See also ==
- Water supply and sanitation in Spain#Links to water resources
