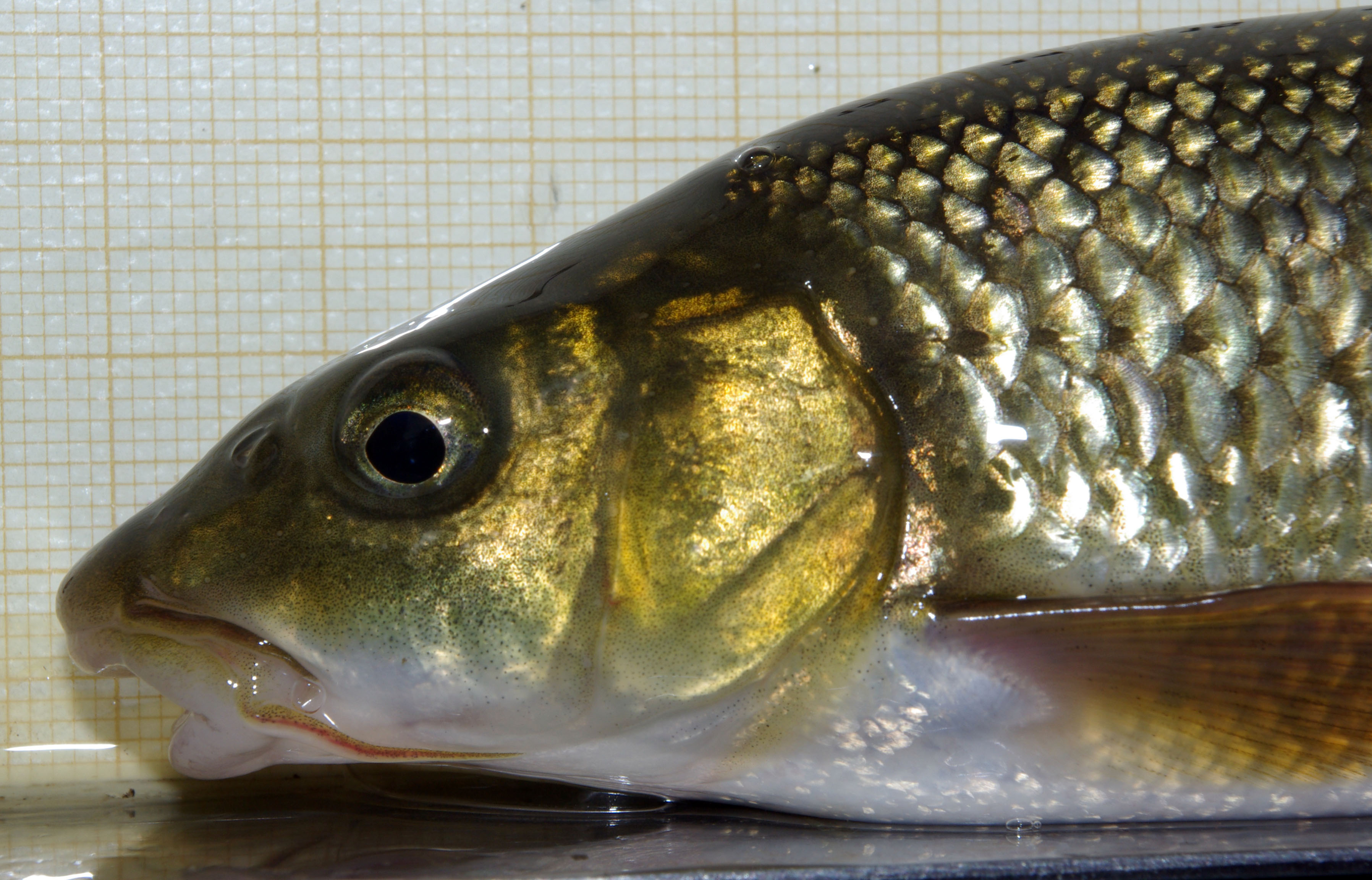

Conservation status
- Near Threatened (IUCN 3.1)

Scientific classification
- Kingdom: Animalia
- Phylum: Chordata
- Class: Actinopterygii
- Order: Cypriniformes
- Family: Cyprinidae
- Subfamily: Barbinae
- Genus: Luciobarbus
- Species: L. graellsii

Binomial name
- Luciobarbus graellsii (Steindachner, 1866)

Synonyms
- Barbus bocagei graellsii Steindachner, 1866 (but see text); Barbus graellsi (lapsus); Barbus graellsii Steindachner, 1866 (but see text); Barbus graelsi (lapsus); Luciobarbus graellsi (lapsus); Luciobarbus graelsi (lapsus); Messinobarbus graellsi (lapsus); Messinobarbus graellsii (Steindachner, 1866); Messinobarbus graelsi (lapsus)

= Luciobarbus graellsii =

Species of fish

Luciobarbus graellsii is a ray-finned fish species in the family Cyprinidae. It is here placed in Luciobarbus following the IUCN, but that genus is very closely related to the other typical barbels and perhaps better considered a mere subgenus of Barbus. The Andalusian barbel was formerly included in L. bocagei as subspecies.

In addition, L. graellsii has – like its close relative the "Albanian barbel" (Luciobarbus albanicus) and the slightly more distantly related red-tailed barbel (Barbus haasi) – also been placed in Messinobarbus. But even if that genus is valid, it is probably incorrect to do so.

It was originally endemic to the northeast of Spain, occurring chiefly on the Mediterranean side in the Ebro's to Ter River' drainage basins, but also on the Atlantic side to the Asón drainage basin. Around 1998, it was introduced to some rivers of Tuscany (Italy) and is now well established in the Albegna, Fiora and Ombrone drainage basins.

L. graellsii is an omnivore, eating mainly large aquatic invertebrates and algae. They spawn from late spring to the height of summer (May to August). They migrate upstream to their spawning sites, which are in faster and more shallow stretches of river, where the bottom is made of gravel and rocks. This species becomes sexually mature at 4 years of age, with a standard length of 15 to 20 cm (5.9 to 7.9 in). It is long-lived, and can get up to 16 years old. Relatively abundant in its range, the Ebro Barbel is considered a Near-threatened species by the IUCN.
