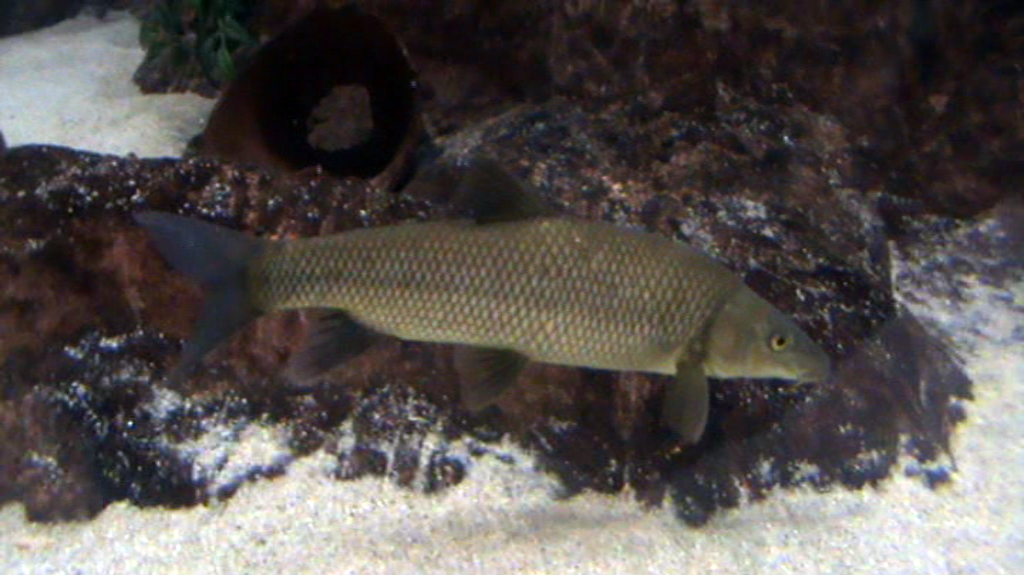

Conservation status
- Near Threatened (IUCN 3.1)

Scientific classification
- Kingdom: Animalia
- Phylum: Chordata
- Class: Actinopterygii
- Order: Cypriniformes
- Family: Cyprinidae
- Subfamily: Barbinae
- Genus: Luciobarbus
- Species: L. microcephalus

Binomial name
- Luciobarbus microcephalus (Almaça (pt), 1966)

Synonyms
- Barbus microcephalus Almaça, 1966 (but see text)

= Luciobarbus microcephalus =

Species of fish

Luciobarbus microcephalus is a ray-finned fish species in the family Cyprinidae. It is here placed in Luciobarbus following the IUCN, but that genus is very closely related to the other typical barbels and perhaps better considered a mere subgenus of Barbus.

This small barbel is less than 26 cm (10 in) long when fully grown. It is endemic to the Iberian Peninsula, where it occurs in the middle and lower Guadiana River's drainage basin in both Portugal and Spain. A presumably introduced population is found in a small stretch of the Tagus. Its natural habitats are deep and slow rivers and reservoirs.

Its numbers are declining across its rather small range, and it is classified as Near Threatened by the IUCN Red List. By 2020 its stocks will probably number less than half of what they were at the turn of the millennium. The main cause of its decline is unsustainable use of water resources, such as water pollution, extraction for agriculture and damming. Certain planned damming projects – e.g. one near Alquedi – are likely to severely impact the species' stocks. Introduced exotic fishes pose an additional problem.

L. microcephalus is listed in Annex V of the European Union's Habitats Directive to allow its taking from the wild to be legally restricted, and – as Barbus capito, which actually refers to its Central Asian relative, the Bulatmai barbel – as Protected Species in Appendix III of the Convention on the Conservation of European Wildlife and Natural Habitats.

== See also ==
- Water supply and sanitation in Spain#Links to water resources
