= Luciobarbus steindachneri =

Conservation status
- Near Threatened (IUCN 3.1)

Scientific classification
- Kingdom: Animalia
- Phylum: Chordata
- Class: Actinopterygii
- Order: Cypriniformes
- Family: Cyprinidae
- Subfamily: Barbinae
- Genus: Luciobarbus
- Species: L. steindachneri

Binomial name
- Luciobarbus steindachneri (Almaça (pt), 1967)

Synonyms
- Barbus steindachneri Almaça, 1967 (but see text)

Species of fish

Luciobarbus steindachneri is a species of cyprinid fish. It is here placed in Luciobarbus following the IUCN, but that genus is very closely related to the other typical barbels and perhaps better considered a mere subgenus of Barbus.

This large barbel can reach a length of almost 50 cm (20 in) when adult. It is endemic to the Iberian Peninsula, where it is found in both Portugal and Spain. It occurs in deep, slow-moving rivers and reservoirs of the middle and lower Guadiana and Tagus River's drainage basins. Abundant growth of water plants seems to be necessary for it to thrive.

It has declined by more than a third since the late 1990s, and it is not a common species anymore; it is classified as Near Threatened by the IUCN. The main cause of its decline is unsustainable use of water resources, such as water pollution, extraction for agriculture and damming. Introduced exotic fishes pose an additional problem. L. steindachneri is listed as Protected Species in Appendix III of the Convention on the Conservation of European Wildlife and Natural Habitats.

== See also ==
- Water supply and sanitation in Spain#Links to water resources
