= Barbel (fish) =

Freshwater fish

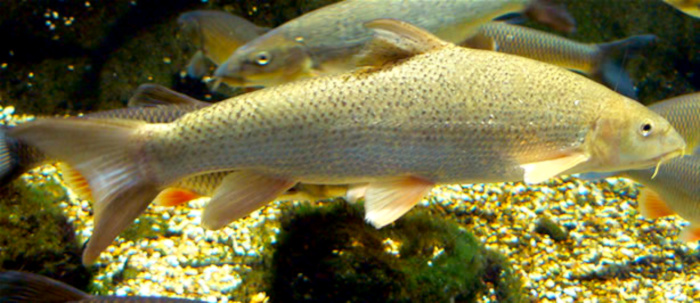
Barbel

Barbels are a group of carp-like freshwater fish, almost all of the genus Barbus. They are usually found in gravel and rocky-bottomed moderate-flowing rivers with high dissolved oxygen content, known as the Barbel zone. A typical adult barbel can range from 25 to 240 cm (9.8 to 94.5 in) in length and weigh between 200 g (7.1 oz) and 200 kg (440 lb), depending on species.

The name barbel derived from the Latin barba, meaning beard, a reference to the two pairs of barbels, a longer pair pointing forwards and slightly down positioned, on the side of the mouth.

Fish described as barbels by English-speaking people may not be known as barbels in their native language, although the root of the word may be similar. For instance, the Mediterranean barbel (Barbus meridionalis) is known as barbeau méridional or barbeau truité in France, but also as drogan, durgan, tourgan, turquan and truitat.

== Europe ==
Barbus barbus, is found throughout northern and eastern Europe, ranging north and east from Great Britain, the Pyrénées and Alps to Lithuania, Poland, Romania, Ukraine and Russia and the northern Black Sea basin, is known simply as the barbel in the and is a popular sport fish, weighing up to 21 lb (9.5 kg). No subspecies of B. barbus are recognised.

The Mediterranean barbel (Barbus meridionalis) is found in Spain and the south of France. It is a much smaller fish than B. barbus.

The Crimean barbel (Barbus tauricus) is found in the Salgir River in the Crimean peninsula. Also the Kuban barbel (Barbus kubanicus) is found in the upper and middle Kuban River in Russia.

Other barbel in Europe include Luciobarbus sclateri, sometimes known as the European barbel; the Italian barbel (Barbus plebejus); the Albanian barbel (Barbus albanicus); Barbus thessalus, Barbus tyberinus and the Iberian barbels, (Luciobarbus bocagei and Luciobarbus comizo) which are found in Spain and Portugal and are eaten by many European duck species. These both grow larger than B. barbus, up to 37 lb (17 kg) for the Comizo barbel.

The Dalmatian barbelgudgeon (Aulopyge huegelii) is an endangered species, native to Bosnia and Croatia. It relies on karst cave systems to spawn.

== Asia ==
The Mangar or pike barbel (Luciobarbus esocinus) is found in Tigris–Euphrates river system, and can grow to 438 lb (198.5 kg) The species scientific name essentially means "pike-like pike-barbel" (after the northern pike, Esox lucius), though a more literal translation would be "pike-like wolf-barbel".

The Aral barbel (Luciobarbus brachycephalus) is found in Central Asia, and Luicobarbus caspius (the Caspian Barbel) is found in the Caspian Sea.

The Bulatmai barbel (Luciobarbus capito, formerly Cyprinus capito) is found in rivers of the Aral and Caspian Sea basins.

The Kura barbel (Gokcha or Mtkvari barbel Barbus cyri) is found in the Kura river in Trans-caucasia and Lake Sevan in Armenia.

The Terek barbel (Barbus ciscaucasicus) is found in the Kuma River, Russia.

The Lizard barbel (Barbus lacerta) is found in Syria.

The Amur barbel or Barbel steed (Hemibarbus labeo) is found in the Amur basin and elsewhere in east and south-east Asia, including south-east Siberia.

The bihorned barbel (Tariqilabeo bicornis) is found in Burma and India.

The Fourbarbel scraper (Capoeta baliki) is a related species found in Turkey in Asia.

== Africa ==
Several small species called barbel including Luciobarbus callensis are found in the Maghreb region of Algeria, Tunisia and Morocco. The largest of these, Luciobarbus maghrebensis, is almost the same size as B. barbus.

The Ripon barbel (Labeobarbus altianalis) is found in the African Great Lakes.

Labeobarbus bynni bynni is found in the Nile and lakes that have been connected to that river. The sub-species Labeobarbus bynni occidentalis is known as the Niger barb.

== Other ==
Occasionally non-cyprinid fish are called barbels such as Austroglanis gilli, or Schilbe mystus, both are catfish. One, Galeichthys feliceps is a marine catfish. Some species of the genus Sinocyclocheilus, cave dwelling fish found in China, have made use of the term barbel in their English common name.

== See also ==
- Genus Barbus which used to be much larger, but is now limited to typical barbels.
- Barb (fish) lists smaller former Barbus species, some popular in aquariums.
- Barbus barbus The barbel native to England and parts of Europe.
- Barbel (anatomy) The whiskerlike structures that give the barbel its name.
