= Euphrates barbel =

Scientific classification
- Kingdom: Animalia
- Phylum: Chordata
- Class: Actinopterygii
- Division: Teleostei
- Order: Cypriniformes
- Family: Cyprinidae
- Subfamily: Barbinae
- Genus: Luciobarbus
- Species: L. mystaceus

Binomial name
- Luciobarbus mystaceus (Pallas, 1814)

Species of fish

The Euphrates barbel (Luciobarbus mystaceus) is a species of cyprinid fish found in the Tigris-Euphrates river system.
