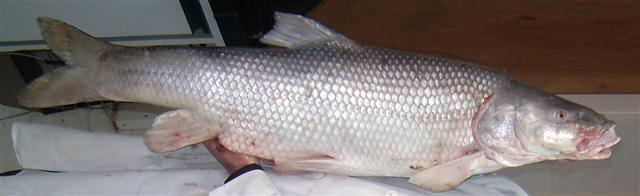

Scientific classification
- Kingdom: Animalia
- Phylum: Chordata
- Class: Actinopterygii
- Division: Teleostei
- Order: Cypriniformes
- Family: Cyprinidae
- Subfamily: Barbinae
- Genus: Luciobarbus
- Species: L. barbulus

Binomial name
- Luciobarbus barbulus (Heckel, 1847)

Synonyms
- Barbus barbulus

= Luciobarbus barbulus =

Species of fish

Luciobarbus barbulus is a species of ray-finned fish in the genus Luciobarbus from Iran.
