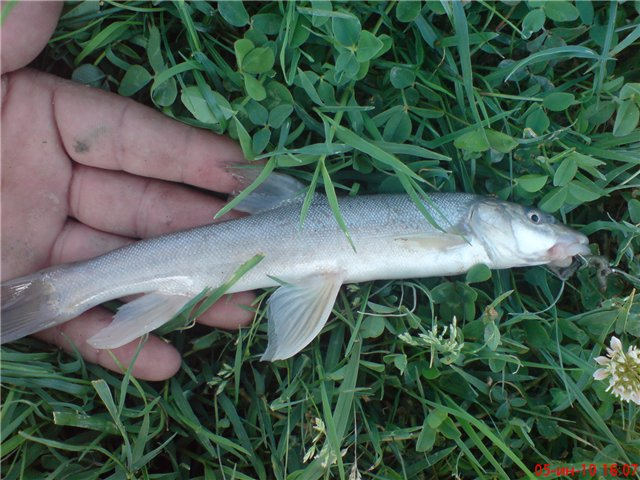

Conservation status
- Least Concern (IUCN 3.1)

Scientific classification
- Kingdom: Animalia
- Phylum: Chordata
- Class: Actinopterygii
- Order: Cypriniformes
- Family: Cyprinidae
- Subfamily: Barbinae
- Genus: Luciobarbus
- Species: L. mursa

Binomial name
- Luciobarbus mursa (Güldenstädt, 1773)

Synonyms
- Cyprinus mursa Güldenstädt, 1773; Barbus mursa (Güldenstädt, 1773); Barbus miliaris De Filippi, 1863; Barbus mursoides Kessler, 1877; Barbus microphthalmus Sauvage, 1882; Barbus kessleri Derjavin, 1929; Barbus dageti Fowler, 1958

= Luciobarbus mursa =

Species of fish

Luciobarbus mursa is a species of ray-finned fish in the genus Luciobarbus from freshwater habitats in Central Asia and Iran.
