= Luciobarbus biscarensis =

Conservation status
- Least Concern (IUCN 3.1)

Scientific classification
- Kingdom: Animalia
- Phylum: Chordata
- Class: Actinopterygii
- Order: Cypriniformes
- Family: Cyprinidae
- Subfamily: Barbinae
- Genus: Luciobarbus
- Species: L. biscarensis

Binomial name
- Luciobarbus biscarensis (Boulenger, 1911)

Synonyms
- Barbus biscarensis Boulenger, 1911; Barbus biscariensis Boulenger, 1911 (lapsus)

Species of fish

Luciobarbus biscarensis, the Sahara barbel is a species of ray-finned fish in the genus Luciobarbus. it is endemic to Algeria.
