= Kersin barbel =

Conservation status
- Data Deficient (IUCN 3.1)

Scientific classification
- Kingdom: Animalia
- Phylum: Chordata
- Class: Actinopterygii
- Division: Teleostei
- Order: Cypriniformes
- Family: Cyprinidae
- Subfamily: Barbinae
- Genus: Luciobarbus
- Species: L. kersin

Binomial name
- Luciobarbus kersin (Heckel, 1843)

Synonyms
- Barbus kersin Heckel, 1843

Species of fish

The Kersin barbel or Berzem (Luciobarbus kersin) is a species of cyprinid fish found in freshwater habitats in Iran, Syria and southeastern Turkey.
