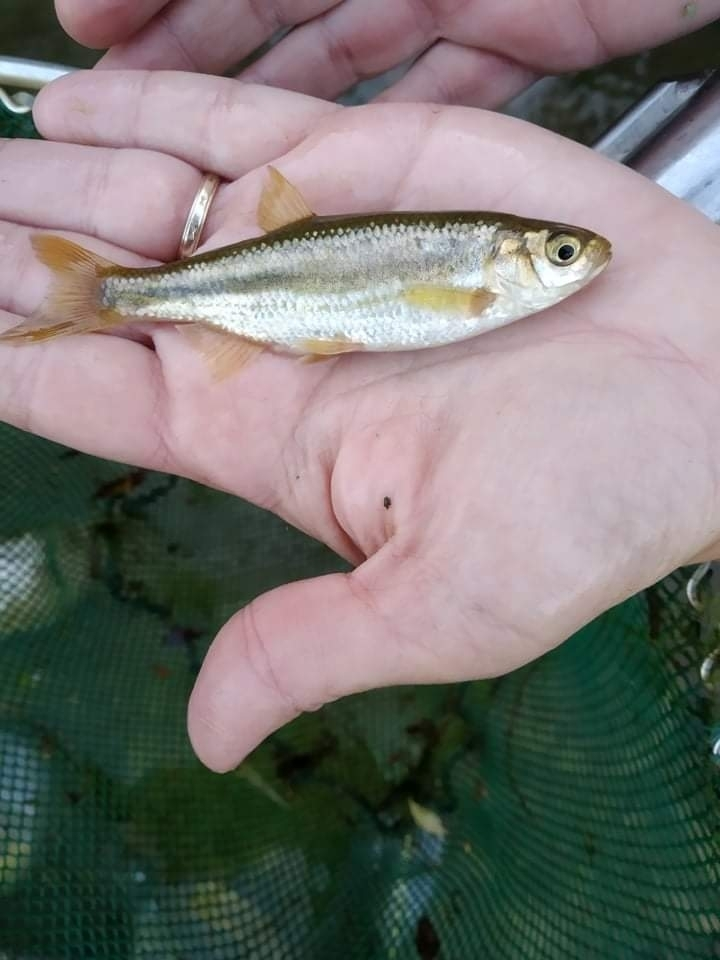
- Tropidophoxinellus spartiaticus

Scientific classification
- Kingdom: Animalia
- Phylum: Chordata
- Class: Actinopterygii
- Order: Cypriniformes
- Family: Leuciscidae
- Subfamily: Leuciscinae
- Genus: Tropidophoxinellus; Stephanidis, 1974

Type species
- Rutilus spartiaticus Stephanidis, 1971

Species
- See text

= Tropidophoxinellus =

Genus of fishes

Tropidophoxinellus is a genus of ray-finned fish belonging to the family Leuciscidae, which includes the daces, Eurasian minnows and related species. There are currently four described species, these fishes are found in Greece and North Africa.

A DNA-based phylogenetic biogeographical report carried out in 2010 recommended that Pseudophoxinus callensis and P. chaignoni from North Africa be added. However, this report was not universally accepted.

== Species ==
- Tropidophoxinellus callensis (Guichenot, 1850)
- Tropidophoxinellus chaignoni (Vaillant, 1904)
- Tropidophoxinellus hellenicus (Stephanidis, 1971)
- Tropidophoxinellus spartiaticus (Schmidt-Ries, 1943)
