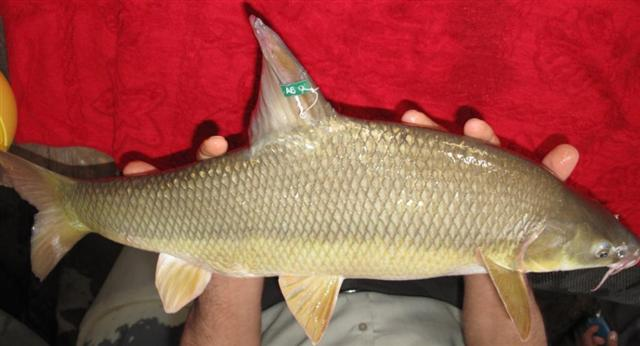

Conservation status
- Least Concern (IUCN 3.1)

Scientific classification
- Kingdom: Animalia
- Phylum: Chordata
- Class: Actinopterygii
- Order: Cypriniformes
- Family: Cyprinidae
- Subfamily: Barbinae
- Genus: Luciobarbus
- Species: L. pectoralis

Binomial name
- Luciobarbus pectoralis (Heckel, 1843)

Synonyms
- Barbus pectoralis Heckel, 1843

= Heckel's Orontes barbel =

Species of fish

Heckel's Orontes barbel or Levantine barbel (Luciobarbus pectoralis) is a species of ray-finned fish in the genus Luciobarbus from the Orontes River basin (including Asi Nehri) in the Near East.
