= Luciobarbus labiosa =

Conservation status
- Least Concern (IUCN 3.1)

Scientific classification
- Kingdom: Animalia
- Phylum: Chordata
- Class: Actinopterygii
- Order: Cypriniformes
- Family: Cyprinidae
- Genus: Luciobarbus
- Species: L. l. (disputed)

Binomial name
- Luciobarbus labiosa (disputed) (Pellegrin, 1920)

Synonyms
- Barbus labiosa Pellegrin, 1920; Barbus massaensis var. labiosa Pellegrin, 1922

Species of fish

Luciobarbus labiosa is a species inquirenda of ray-finned fish in the family Cyprinidae.

It is found only in Morocco. Its natural habitat is rivers. It is not considered a threatened species by the IUCN.

The taxonomy and systematics of the Maghreb barbs are subject to considerable dispute. Some authors consider B. labiosa a distinct species, while others include it in the Algerian barb (Luciobarbus callensis), or Maghreb barbel (L. maghrebensis).
