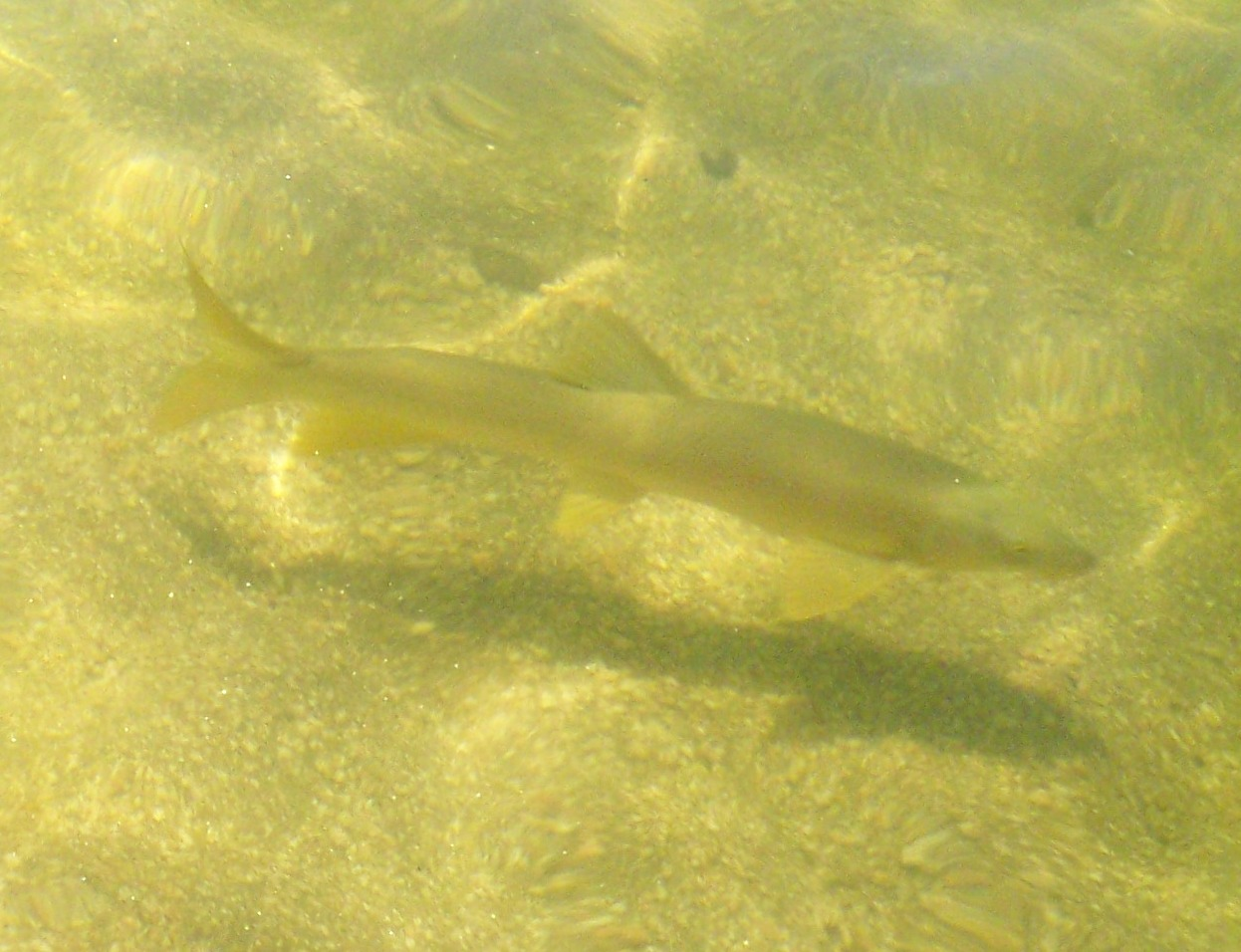

Conservation status
- Near Threatened (IUCN 3.1)

Scientific classification
- Kingdom: Animalia
- Phylum: Chordata
- Class: Actinopterygii
- Order: Cypriniformes
- Family: Cyprinidae
- Subfamily: Barbinae
- Genus: Luciobarbus
- Species: L. comizo

Binomial name
- Luciobarbus comizo (Steindachner, 1864)
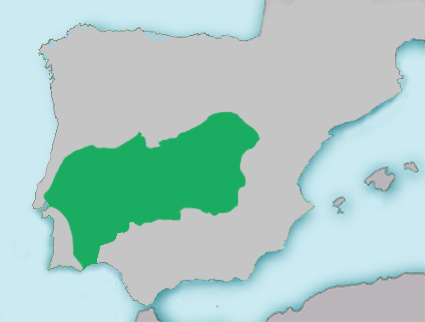

Synonyms
- Barbus comizo Steindachner, 1864; Messinobarbus comizo

= Iberian barbel =

Species of fish

The Iberian barbel (Luciobarbus comizo) is a ray-finned fish species in the family Cyprinidae. It is here placed in Luciobarbus following the IUCN, but that genus is very closely related to the other typical barbels and perhaps better considered a mere subgenus of Barbus. This large barbel can grow to over 50 cm (20 in) long.

Natural hybrids of this barbel and the closely related L. bocagei are not uncommon in the middle Tagus river. The two species and their hybrids are hard to distinguish, but L. comizo usually has a longer and more narrow snout, and the last unbranched ray of the dorsal fin has a longer denticulated section but with more widely spaced denticles. In the first two traits the hybrids are intermediate between their parent species, in the latter they are closer to the Iberian Barbel. Also, the two species are distinguished by their microhabitat preferences where they are sympatric, with L. bocagei inhabiting somewhat faster-moving parts of the river. The hybridisation confounds phylogenetic studies based only on mtDNA.

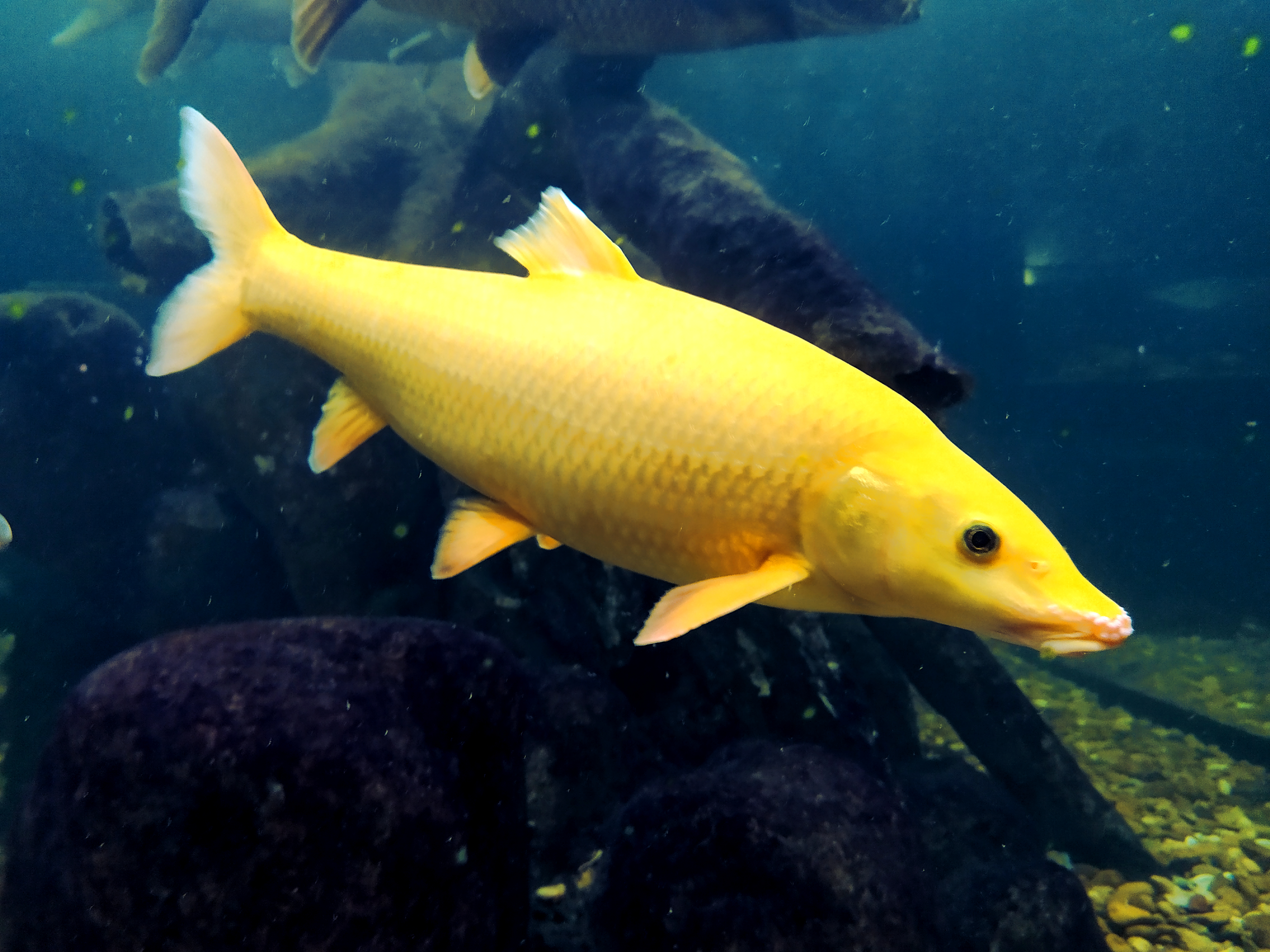
Yellow specimen

L. comizo is endemic to the Iberian Peninsula, where it occurs in both Portugal and Spain. It inhabits the slow-moving middle and lower parts of rivers and reservoirs in the Tagus' and the Guadiana Rivers' drainage basins. Its habitat are deep and almost stagnant waters with abundant aquatic vegetation.

Its numbers have declined by about one-third since the 1990s due to unsustainable water usage for agriculture, pollution and competition with introduced species. Whether hybridisation with the more numerous L. bocagei also affects its numbers is not known. The two must have achieved reproductive isolation in the past to become as disting as they are, but damming and other construction have in recent times shifted the river's currents and changed microhabitat, so that these barbels will now meet at spawning sites more often. Altogether however, damming will slow the river's flow to almost a standstill, creating conditions more favourable to the Iberian Barbel than to L. bocagei, and the hybridisation may actually be a sign of the rarer species becoming more plentiful.

In any case, the unsustainable extraction of for agriculture is the main threat of L. comizo. It is by no means as common as it was in past times, and classified as a Vulnerable by the IUCN. It is listed in Annex II of the European Union's Habitats Directive as a Species Requiring Designation of Special Conservation Areas, and in Annex V to allow for legal restrictions to its taking. It is also named as Protected Species in Appendix III of the Convention on the Conservation of European Wildlife and Natural Habitats.

== See also ==
- Water supply and sanitation in Spain#Links to water resources
