= Yahyaoui barbel =

Conservation status
- Least Concern (IUCN 3.1)

Scientific classification
- Kingdom: Animalia
- Phylum: Chordata
- Class: Actinopterygii
- Order: Cypriniformes
- Family: Cyprinidae
- Subfamily: Barbinae
- Genus: Luciobarbus
- Species: L. yahyaouii

Binomial name
- Luciobarbus yahyaouii Doadrio, Casal-Lopez & Perea, 2016

Species of fish

The Yahyaoui barbel (Luciobarbus yahyaouii) is a species of cyprinid fish endemic to Morocco found in the Moulouya River.
