= Luciobarbus lepineyi =

Conservation status
- Least Concern (IUCN 3.1)

Scientific classification
- Kingdom: Animalia
- Phylum: Chordata
- Class: Actinopterygii
- Order: Cypriniformes
- Family: Cyprinidae
- Genus: Luciobarbus
- Species: L. lepineyi

Binomial name
- Luciobarbus lepineyi (Pellegrin, 1939)

Synonyms
- Barbus lepineyi Luciobarbus pallaryi

Species of fish

Luciobarbus lepineyi, the Draa barbel, is a doubtfully distinct ray-finned fish species in the family Cyprinidae.

It is found only in Morocco. Its natural habitat is freshwater rivers in the Ziz, Noun and Draa river drainages, in the central and southern parts of the country. It is not considered a threatened species by the IUCN.

The taxonomy and systematics of the Maghreb barbs are subject to considerable dispute. Some authors consider L. lepineyi a distinct species, while others include it in the Algerian barb (Luciobarbus callensis), or L. pallaryi.
