= Luciobarbus setivimensis =

Conservation status
- Least Concern (IUCN 3.1)

Scientific classification
- Kingdom: Animalia
- Phylum: Chordata
- Class: Actinopterygii
- Order: Cypriniformes
- Family: Cyprinidae
- Subfamily: Barbinae
- Genus: Luciobarbus
- Species: L. setivimensis

Binomial name
- Luciobarbus setivimensis Valenciennes, 1842

Synonyms
- Barbus setivimensis

Species of fish

Luciobarbus setivimensis is a ray-finned fish species in the family Cyprinidae.

It is found only in Algeria. Its natural habitat are rivers, water storage areas, and canals and ditches. It is not considered a threatened species by the IUCN.

The taxonomy and systematics of the Maghreb barbs are subject to considerable dispute. Some authors consider L. setivimensis a distinct species, while others include it in the Algerian barb (L. callensis).
