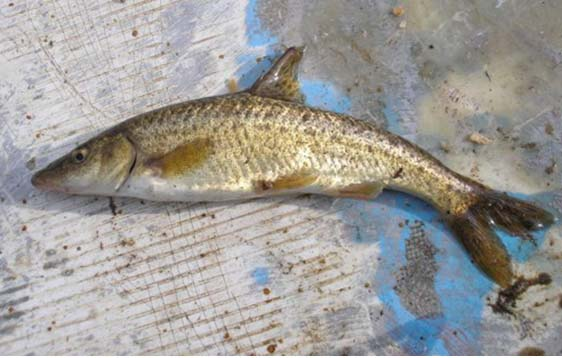

Conservation status
- Endangered (IUCN 3.1)

Scientific classification
- Kingdom: Animalia
- Phylum: Chordata
- Class: Actinopterygii
- Division: Teleostei
- Order: Cypriniformes
- Family: Cyprinidae
- Subfamily: Barbinae
- Genus: Aulopyge; Heckel, 1841
- Species: A. huegelii

Binomial name
- Aulopyge huegelii Heckel, 1842

= Dalmatian barbelgudgeon =

Species of fish

The Dalmatian barbelgudgeon (Aulopyge huegelii) is a European ray-finned fish species in the family Cyprinidae. It is the only member of the monotypic genus Aulopyge. The genus name is derived from the ancient Greek aulós (αὐλός, "flute") + pygé (πῦγή, "behind, rump"), and thus means approximately "fluted tail-stem". The specific name honours the Austrian naturalist and diplomat Charles von Hügel. Though the genus was established in 1841, the species was only mentioned but not described at that time; that happened the following year, and in 1843, the frequently-seen misspelling huegeli was introduced. Many fish databases use 1843 as the year of description. The IUCN Red List uses 1843 and also has an explanation of the confusion.

As its common name implies, it is a cyprinid looking somewhat intermediate between a barbel and a gudgeon. It is, however, only convergent to the typical gudgeon subfamily (Gobioninae) and in fact among the closest relatives of the typical barbels (Barbus and the doubtfully distinct Luciobarbus) – if it is not actually their closest relative.

It is found in Bosnia and Herzegovina and Croatia, where it inhabits the karst. It occurs in some creeks in the Livanjsko field, in the Cetina, Krka and perhaps Zrmanja Rivers, and it was successfully introduced to Lake Blidin and Busko Blato. The Dalmatian barbelgudgeon is mainly nocturnal. It apparently moves into karst caves for spawning, which occurs in the month after the water temperature has reached 20 °C (68 °F). The female deposits her eggs, which measure about 1.5-2.0 mm, in rock and gravel fissures with a specialized ovipositor.

Though its stocks are declining (it was once present in the Zrmanja River, but may have gone extinct there), it is still locally numerous. But damming of its home rivers, unsustainable water extraction for agriculture, water pollution and perhaps introduced species threaten its long-term survival. It is therefore classified as endangered by the IUCN.

== Sources ==
- Bless, Rüdiger; Riehl, Rüdiger (2002). "Biology and Egg Morphology of the Dalmatian Barbelgudgeon Aulopyge huegeli [sic], an Endangered Endemic Species in Croatia". Environmental Biology of Fishes. 63 (4): 451–456. Bibcode:2002EnvBF..63..451B. doi:10.1023/A:1014992626062.
- de Graaf, Martin; Megens, Hendrik-Jan; Samallo, Johannis; Sibbing, Ferdinand A. (2007). "Evolutionary origin of Lake Tana's (Ethiopia) small Barbus species: indications of rapid ecological divergence and speciation". Anim. Biol. 57 (1): 39–48. doi:10.1163/157075607780002069.
- Froese, Rainer; Pauly, Daniel (eds.). "Aulopyge huegelii". FishBase. August 2011 version.
