= Luciobarbus antinorii =

Conservation status
- Extinct (yes) (IUCN 3.1)

Scientific classification
- Kingdom: Animalia
- Phylum: Chordata
- Class: Actinopterygii
- Order: Cypriniformes
- Family: Cyprinidae
- Genus: Luciobarbus
- Species: †L. antinorii

Binomial name
- †Luciobarbus antinorii Boulenger, 1911

Species of fish

Luciobarbus antinorii, commonly known as the Tunisian barb or Chott el Djerid barbel, was a doubtfully distinct ray-finned fish species in the family Cyprinidae.

It was found only in Tunisia, in the artesian well of Chott el Djerid and Fatnassa en Nefaoua. Its natural habitat is freshwater springs. It was threatened by water extraction and the status up until its extinction was insufficiently known as it was last recorded in 1989. Surveys in 2010 and 2011 failed to produce the species, and locals recounted encountering the fish in the past, however it was no longer seen by them.

The taxonomy and systematics of the Maghreb barbs are subject to considerable dispute. Some authors consider L. antinorii a distinct species, while others include it in the Algerian barb (Luciobarbus callensis).
