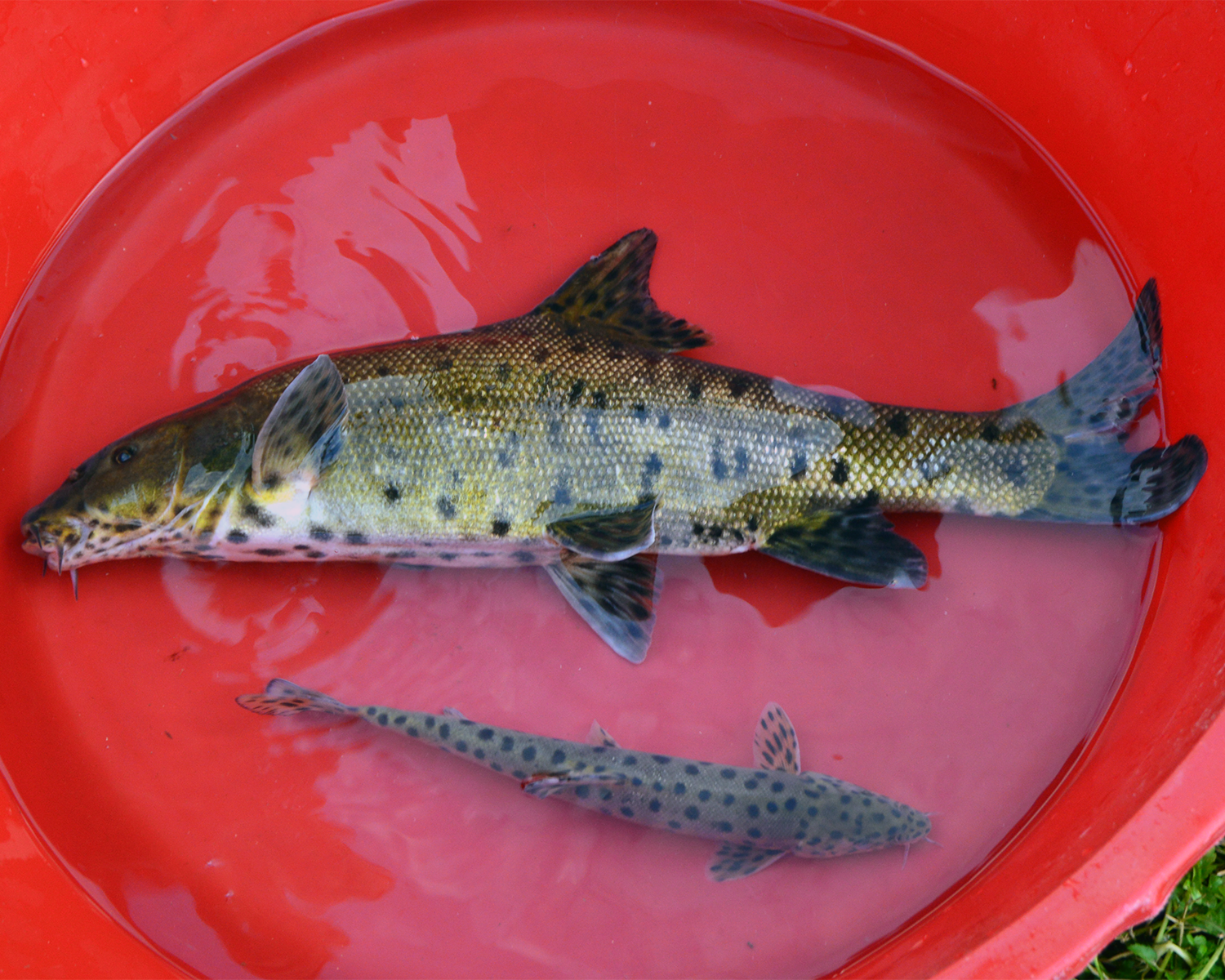

Conservation status
- Critically Endangered (IUCN 3.1)

Scientific classification
- Kingdom: Animalia
- Phylum: Chordata
- Class: Actinopterygii
- Order: Cypriniformes
- Family: Cyprinidae
- Subfamily: Barbinae
- Genus: Luciobarbus
- Species: L. subquincunciatus

Binomial name
- Luciobarbus subquincunciatus (Günther, 1868)

Synonyms
- Barbus subquincunciatus Günther, 1868

= Mesopotamian barbel =

Species of fish

The Mesopotamian barbel or leopard barbel (Luciobarbus subquincunciatus) is a species of cyprinid fish found in the Tigris-Euphrates river system and is an inhabitant of large rivers. It has been (and most likely is still) declining very rapidly for at least the last 30 years. This species has disappeared for 12 years until it was rediscovered in January 2024 after a local fisherman caught an individual, and soon after another individual was captured. While there are not enough data to identify the actual rate of population decline, it was once locally abundant but now almost absent.

== Distribution ==
Leopard barbel is found across the Tigris-Euphrates Basin of Turkey, Syria, Iraq, and Iran.
