= Luciobarbus figuigensis =

Conservation status
- Vulnerable (IUCN 3.1)

Scientific classification
- Kingdom: Animalia
- Phylum: Chordata
- Class: Actinopterygii
- Order: Cypriniformes
- Family: Cyprinidae
- Genus: Luciobarbus
- Species: L. figuigensis

Binomial name
- Luciobarbus figuigensis (Pellegrin, 1913)

Synonyms
- Barbus callensis figuigensis Barbus figuigensis Luicobarbus figuiguensis (lapsus)

Species of fish

Luciobarbus figuigensis is a doubtfully distinct ray-finned fish species in the family Cyprinidae.

It is found in Algeria and Morocco. Its natural habitat is inland karsts.

The taxonomy and systematics of the Maghreb barbs are subject to considerable dispute. Some authors consider L. figuigensis a distinct species, while others include it in the Algerian barb (Luciobarbus callensis). The specific name refers to the oasis town of Figuig on the Morocco/Algeria border, where this species is found in the karstic aquifers and, occasionally, in above ground cisterns.
