= Guercif barbel =

Conservation status
- Endangered (IUCN 3.1)

Scientific classification
- Kingdom: Animalia
- Phylum: Chordata
- Class: Actinopterygii
- Order: Cypriniformes
- Family: Cyprinidae
- Subfamily: Barbinae
- Genus: Luciobarbus
- Species: L. guercifensis

Binomial name
- Luciobarbus guercifensis Doadrio, Perea & Yahyahoui, 2016

Species of fish

The Guercif barbel (Luciobarbus guercifensis) is a species of ray-finned fish in the genus Luciobarbus. it is endemic to the Moulouya River in Morocco.
