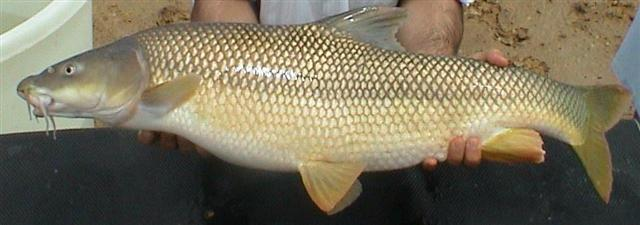

Conservation status
- Vulnerable (IUCN 3.1)

Scientific classification
- Kingdom: Animalia
- Phylum: Chordata
- Class: Actinopterygii
- Order: Cypriniformes
- Family: Cyprinidae
- Subfamily: Barbinae
- Genus: Luciobarbus
- Species: L. xanthopterus

Binomial name
- Luciobarbus xanthopterus Heckel, 1843

= Yellowfin barbel =

Species of fish

The yellowfin barbel (Luciobarbus xanthopterus) is a species of cyprinid fish endemic to the Tigris-Euphrates River System.
