= Rifian barbel =

Conservation status
- Least Concern (IUCN 3.1)

Scientific classification
- Kingdom: Animalia
- Phylum: Chordata
- Class: Actinopterygii
- Order: Cypriniformes
- Family: Cyprinidae
- Subfamily: Barbinae
- Genus: Luciobarbus
- Species: L. rifensis

Binomial name
- Luciobarbus rifensis Doadrio, Perea & Yahyaoui, 2015

Species of fish

The Rifian barbel (Luciobarbus rifensis) is a species of cyprinid fish endemic to northern Morocco found from the Loukkos River basin on the western Atlantic slope to the Laou River basin on the eastern Mediterranean.
