= Tropidophoxinellus hellenicus =

Conservation status
- Near Threatened (IUCN 3.1)

Scientific classification
- Kingdom: Animalia
- Phylum: Chordata
- Class: Actinopterygii
- Order: Cypriniformes
- Family: Leuciscidae
- Subfamily: Leuciscinae
- Genus: Tropidophoxinellus
- Species: T. hellenicus

Binomial name
- Tropidophoxinellus hellenicus (Stephanidis, 1971)

Synonyms
- Rutilus alburnoides hellenicus Stephanidis, 1971

Species of fish

Tropidophoxinellus hellenicus, the Hellenic roachminnow, is a species of freshwater ray-finned fish belonging to the family Leuciscidae, which includes the daces, Eurasian minnows and related species. This fish is endemic to southern Greece.

== Taxonomy ==
Tropidophoxinellus hellenicus was first formally described as Rutilus alburnoides hellenicus in 1971 by the Greek ichthyologist Alexander I. Stephanidis with its type locality given as the Pinios River at Vartholomio in Peloponnesus, Greece. This species is now classified in the genus Tropidophoxinellus which was proposed as a genus by Stephanidis in 1974 and is classified within the subfamily Leuciscinae in the Family Leuciscidae.

== Etymology ==
Tropidophoxinellus hellenicus is classified in the genus Tropidophoxinellus, a name which prefixes the minnow genus name Phoxinus with trophidos, the genitive of tropis, which means "keel" and is an allusion to the scaleless keel which runs from the pelvic fins to the anus. The specific name, hellenicus, means "of Greece", where this species is endemic.

== Description ==
Tropidophoxinellus hellenicus can be told apart from T. spartiaticus by its mouth opening upwards, the lower jaw projects beyond the upper jaw and by having between 37 and 40 scales along the lateral line. This species has a maximum standard length of 9.3 cm (3.7 in).

== Distribution and habitat ==
Tropidophoxinellus hellenicus is endemic to the southwestern Greece. Here it occurs from the lower Achelous, including lakes Trichonida, Lysimachia and Amvrakia, south to the Pineios River in the northwestern Peloponnese. This is s schooling species of lowland rivers, lakes and spring-fed streams where there is slow-moving or still water with aquatic vegetation.

== Conservation ==
Tropidophoxinellus hellenicus is classified as Near-threatened by the International Union for Conservation of Nature. The threats to this species include pollution, water abstraction, anthropogenic habitat modification, drought and non-native invasive species.
