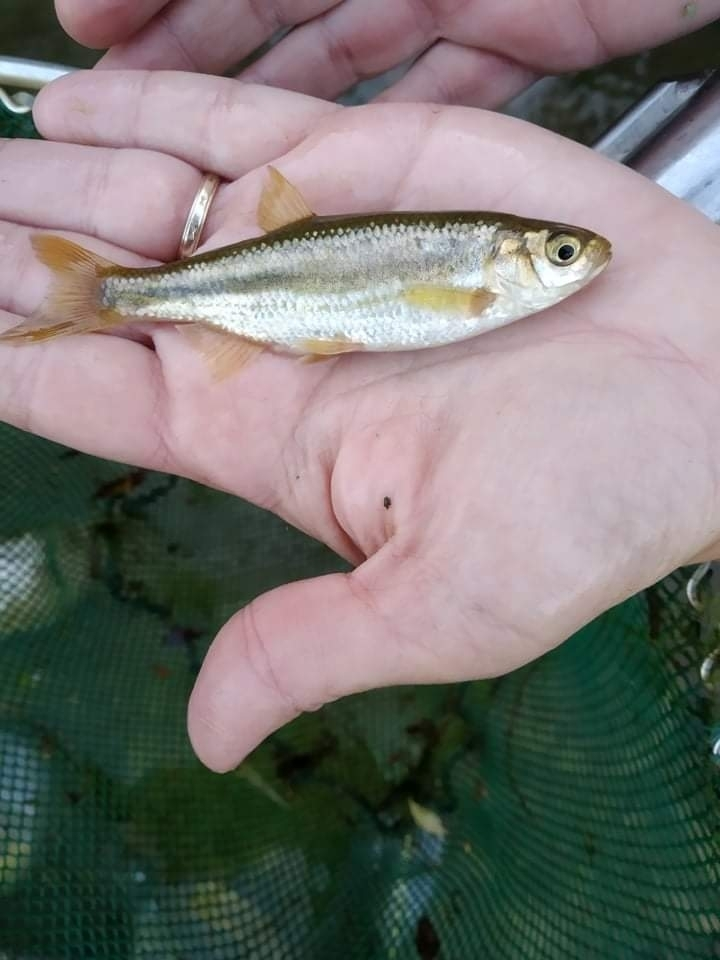

Conservation status
- Near Threatened (IUCN 3.1)

Scientific classification
- Kingdom: Animalia
- Phylum: Chordata
- Class: Actinopterygii
- Order: Cypriniformes
- Family: Leuciscidae
- Subfamily: Leuciscinae
- Genus: Tropidophoxinellus
- Species: T. spartiaticus

Binomial name
- Tropidophoxinellus spartiaticus (Schmidt-Ries, 1943)

Synonyms
- Rutilus spartiaticus Schmidt-Ries, 1943

= Tropidophoxinellus spartiaticus =

Species of fish

Tropidophoxinellus spartiaticus, the Spartian minnowroach, is a species of freshwater ray-finned fish belonging to the family Leuciscidae, which includes the daces, Eurasian minnows and related species. This fish is endemic to southern Greece.

== Taxonomy ==
Tropidophoxinellus spartiaticus was first formally described as Rutilus spartiaticus in 1943 by the German biologist Hans Schmidt-Ries with its type locality given as the Peloponnese in Greece. This species is now classified in the genus Tropidophoxinellus which was proposed as a genus by the Greek ichthyologist Alexander I. Stephanidis in 1974, with this species designated as its type species, and is classified within the subfamily Leuciscinae in the Family Leuciscidae.

== Etymology ==
Tropidophoxinellus spartiaticus is the type species of the genus Tropidophoxinellus, a name which prefixes the minnow genus name Phoxinus with trophidos, the genitive of tropis, which means "keel" and is an allusion to the scaleless keel which runs from the pelvic fins to the anus. The specific name, spartiaticus, means "of Sparta", the polis which dominated the Peloponnese in the Classical period.

== Description ==
Tropidophoxinellus spartiaticus can be told apart from T. hellenicus by having a terminal mouth with the upper jaw just projecting beyond the lower and having between 40 and 44 scales along the lateral line. This species has a maximum standard length of 9.5 cm (3.7 in).

== Distribution and habitat ==
Tropidophoxinellus spartiaticus is endemic to the southwestern Greece. Here it is restricted to the southern Peloponnese where it is found from the Neda to the Evrotas where it is commonest in slow-flowing perennial reaches where there is a dense growth of aquatic vegetation.

== Conservation ==
Tropidophoxinellus spartiaticus is classified as Near-threatened by the International Union for Conservation of Nature. The threats to this species include pollution, water abstraction, anthropogenic habitat modification and drought.
