= Carasobarbus moulouyensis =

Conservation status
- Least Concern (IUCN 3.1)

Scientific classification
- Kingdom: Animalia
- Phylum: Chordata
- Class: Actinopterygii
- Order: Cypriniformes
- Family: Cyprinidae
- Subfamily: Torinae
- Genus: Carasobarbus
- Species: C. moulouyensis

Binomial name
- Carasobarbus moulouyensis (Pellegrin, 1924)

Synonyms
- Barbus moulouyensis Pellegron, 1924

Species of fish

Carasobarbus moulouyensis is a ray-finned fish species in the family Cyprinidae. It is found only in Morocco.

Its natural habitat is rivers. It is not considered a threatened species by the IUCN.

The taxonomy and systematics of the Maghreb barbs are subject to considerable dispute. Some authors consider C. moulouyensis a distinct species, while others include it in the Algerian barb (Luciobarbus callensis).
