= Rabat barbel =

Conservation status
- Least Concern (IUCN 3.1)

Scientific classification
- Kingdom: Animalia
- Phylum: Chordata
- Class: Actinopterygii
- Order: Cypriniformes
- Family: Cyprinidae
- Genus: Luciobarbus
- Species: L. rabatensis

Binomial name
- Luciobarbus rabatensis Doadrio, Perea & Yahyaoui, 2015

Species of fish

The Rabat barbel (Luciobarbus rabatensis) is a species of cyprinid fish endemic to Bou Regreg River basin in northern Morocco.
