= Luciobarbus leptopogon =

Conservation status
- Endangered (IUCN 3.1)

Scientific classification
- Kingdom: Animalia
- Phylum: Chordata
- Class: Actinopterygii
- Order: Cypriniformes
- Family: Cyprinidae
- Subfamily: Barbinae
- Genus: Luciobarbus
- Species: L. leptopogon

Binomial name
- Luciobarbus leptopogon G. H. W. Schimper, 1834

Synonyms
- Barbus leptopogon

Species of fish

Luciobarbus leptopogon is a species of ray-finned fish in the genus Luciobarbus which is found in Algeria.
