= Caspian barbel =

Conservation status
- Least Concern (IUCN 3.1)

Scientific classification
- Kingdom: Animalia
- Phylum: Chordata
- Class: Actinopterygii
- Order: Cypriniformes
- Family: Cyprinidae
- Subfamily: Barbinae
- Genus: Luciobarbus
- Species: L. caspius

Binomial name
- Luciobarbus caspius (L. S. Berg, 1914)

Species of fish

The Caspian barbel (Luciobarbus caspius) is a species of Cyprinid fish native to the Kura-Aras watershed in the wider Near East. In Persian, it is called zardak (زردک).

== Sources ==
- Froese, Rainer; Pauly, Daniel (eds.). "Luciobarbus caspius". FishBase. August 2011 version.
