= Luciobarbus pallaryi =

Conservation status
- Least Concern (IUCN 3.1)

Scientific classification
- Kingdom: Animalia
- Phylum: Chordata
- Class: Actinopterygii
- Order: Cypriniformes
- Family: Cyprinidae
- Subfamily: Barbinae
- Genus: Luciobarbus
- Species: L. pallaryi

Binomial name
- Luciobarbus pallaryi (Pellegrin, 1919)

Synonyms
- Barbus pallaryi

Species of fish

Luciobarbus pallaryi, the Zousfana barb, is a ray-finned fish species in the family Cyprinidae. It is found in Algeria and Morocco.

Its natural habitat is freshwater springs along the course of the Oued Zouzfana, which is a wadi or intermittent river. It is not considered a threatened species by the IUCN.

The taxonomy and systematics of the Maghreb barbs are subject to considerable dispute. Some authors consider L. pallaryi a distinct species, while others include it in the Algerian barb (L. callensis). Some authorities consider Luciobarbus lepineyi to be conspecific with L. pallaryi when the latter is considered a distinct species.
