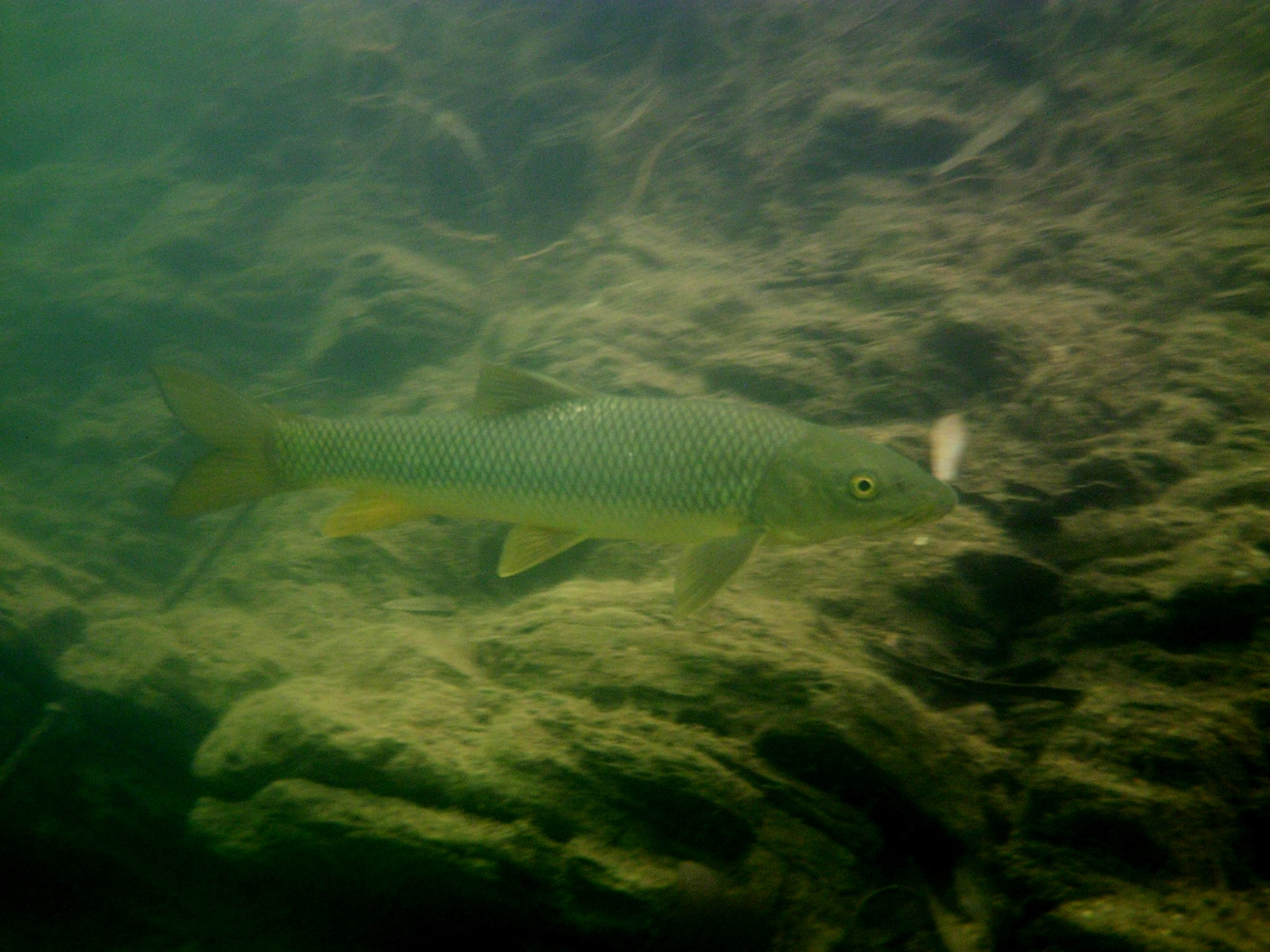

Conservation status
- Near Threatened (IUCN 3.1)

Scientific classification
- Kingdom: Animalia
- Phylum: Chordata
- Class: Actinopterygii
- Order: Cypriniformes
- Family: Cyprinidae
- Subfamily: Barbinae
- Genus: Luciobarbus
- Species: L. sclateri

Binomial name
- Luciobarbus sclateri (Günther, 1868)

Synonyms
- Barbus bocagei sclateri Günther, 1868 (but see text); Barbus sclateri Günther, 1868 (but see text)

= Andalusian barbel =

Species of fish

The Andalusian barbel (Luciobarbus sclateri), also called gypsy barbel (which is a direct translation of Spanish: Barbo gitano), is a freshwater fish species in the family Cyprinidae. It is here placed in Luciobarbus following the IUCN, but that genus is very closely related to the other typical barbels and perhaps better considered a mere subgenus of Barbus. The Andalusian barbel was formerly included in L. bocagei as a subspecies.

L. sclateri is endemic to the southern part Iberian Peninsula, where it occurs in both Portugal and Spain. It inhabits the middle and lower parts of rivers, between the Segura's and the Mira Rivers' drainage basins. It is not very particular as regards its habitat choice, and will use anything except small cool torrential mountain streams. They spawn at the beginning of summer, between May and June. The males reach sexual maturity at 2 to 4 years of age and around 8 cm (3.1 in), while females only reach maturity in their sixth or seventh year and at 11 to 16 cm (4.3 to 6.3 in) in length. They grow to a maximum length of about 50 cm (20 in). It is a long-lived species, with a maximum age of 18 years having been recorded.

The Andalusian barbel is quite abundant and not considered a threatened species by the IUCN, though locally populations may be extirpated during summer droughts which isolate and dry up small creeks it inhabits. Habitat fragmentation, which is already affecting the species, is exacerbated by this.
