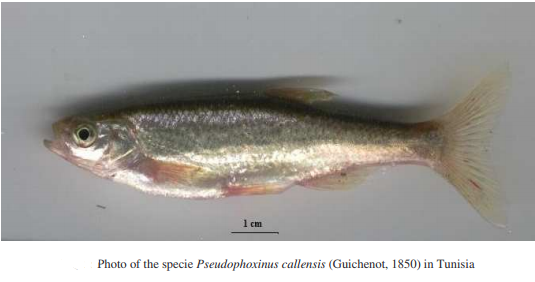

Conservation status
- Least Concern (IUCN 3.1)

Scientific classification
- Kingdom: Animalia
- Phylum: Chordata
- Class: Actinopterygii
- Order: Cypriniformes
- Family: Leuciscidae
- Subfamily: Leuciscinae
- Genus: Tropidophoxinellus
- Species: T. callensis

Binomial name
- Tropidophoxinellus callensis (Guichenot, 1850)

Synonyms
- Leuciscus callensis Guichenot, 1850; Pseudophoxinus callensis (Guichenot 1850); Phoxinellus guichenoti Pellegrin, 1920

= Tropidophoxinellus callensis =

Species of fish

Tropidophoxinellus callensis is a species of freshwater ray-finned fish belonging to the family Leuciscidae, which includes the daces, Eurasian minnows and related species.. It is found in Algeria and Tunisia. Its natural habitats are rivers and freshwater lakes.
