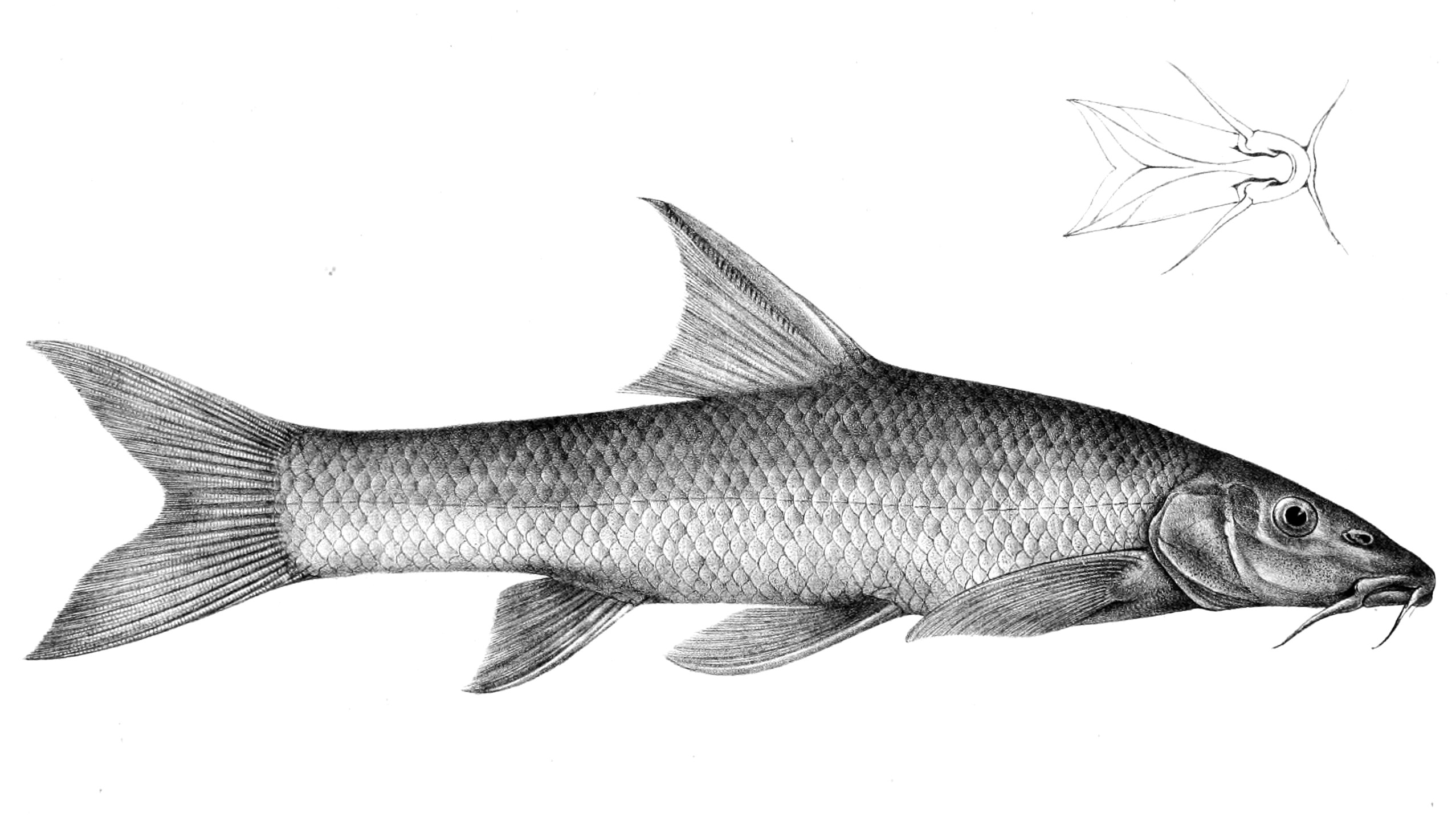

Conservation status
- Extinct (yes) (IUCN 3.1)

Scientific classification
- Kingdom: Animalia
- Phylum: Chordata
- Class: Actinopterygii
- Order: Cypriniformes
- Family: Cyprinidae
- Subfamily: Barbinae
- Genus: Luciobarbus
- Species: †L. nasus

Binomial name
- †Luciobarbus nasus Günther, 1874

Synonyms
- Barbus nasus

= Luciobarbus nasus =

Species of fish

Luciobarbus nasus is an extinct ray-finned fish species in the family Cyprinidae. It was only found in the Oued Ksob of Morocco.

It inhabited habitat freshwater springs and was threatened by habitat loss.

The taxonomy and systematics of the Maghreb barbs are subject to considerable dispute. Some authors include the much more common L. magniatlantis in L. nasus, while others consider them distinct.
