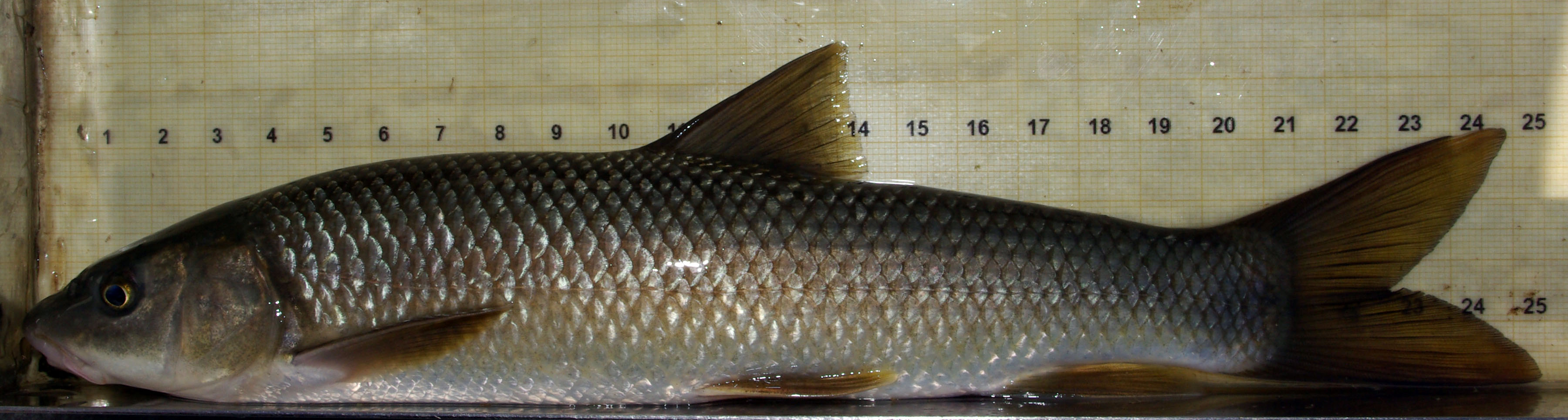

Conservation status
- Near Threatened (IUCN 3.1)

Scientific classification
- Kingdom: Animalia
- Phylum: Chordata
- Class: Actinopterygii
- Order: Cypriniformes
- Family: Cyprinidae
- Subfamily: Barbinae
- Genus: Luciobarbus
- Species: L. bocagei

Binomial name
- Luciobarbus bocagei (Steindachner, 1864)
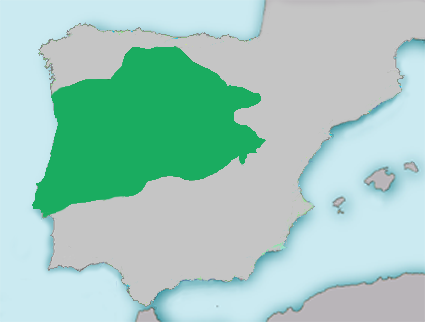

Synonyms
- Barbus bocagei Steindachner, 1864

= Luciobarbus bocagei =

Species of fish

Luciobarbus bocagei is a ray-finned fish species in the family Cyprinidae. Its scientific name honours the Portuguese zoologist and politician Jose Vicente Barboza du Bocage. It is here placed in Luciobarbus following the IUCN, but that genus is very closely related to the other typical barbels and perhaps better considered a mere subgenus of Barbus. The Ebro barbel (L. graellsii) and Andalusian barbel (L. sclateri) were formerly included in L. bocagei as subspecies.

Natural hybrids of this barbel and the closely related Iberian Barbel (L. comizo, a near-threatened species) are not uncommon in the middle Tagus river. The two species and their hybrids are hard to distinguish, but L. bocagei has a shorter and wider head, and the last unbranched ray of the dorsal fin has a shorter denticulated section but with more densely packed denticles. In the first two traits the hybrids are intermediate between their parent species, in the latter they are closer to L. comizo. Also, the two species are distinguished by their microhabitat preferences where they are sympatric, with L. comizo inhabiting almost stagnant parts of the river. The hybridisation confounds phylogenetic studies based only on mtDNA.

L. bocagei is endemic to the Atlantic part Iberian Peninsula, where it occurs in both Portugal and Spain. It inhabits the slow-moving middle and lower parts of rivers, between the Limia/Lima's and the Sado Rivers' drainage basins (i.e. including the Douro and Tagus for example). Though its range is not particularly large, L. bocagei is quite abundant and is considered a near-threatened species by the IUCN.

It eats mainly benthic invertebrates and detritus. They spawn in late spring to early summer (May to June) in faster-moving water than they normally inhabit. The males reach sexual maturity at three years of age and about 7 cm (2.8 in), while females take twice as long at least and in some cases only reach maturity at 8 years of age and 20 cm (7.9 in) in length. This is a long-lived species, with a maximum age of 14 years having been recorded.

== See also ==
- Barbus haasi, a related species endemic to Bages comarca in Catalonia.
