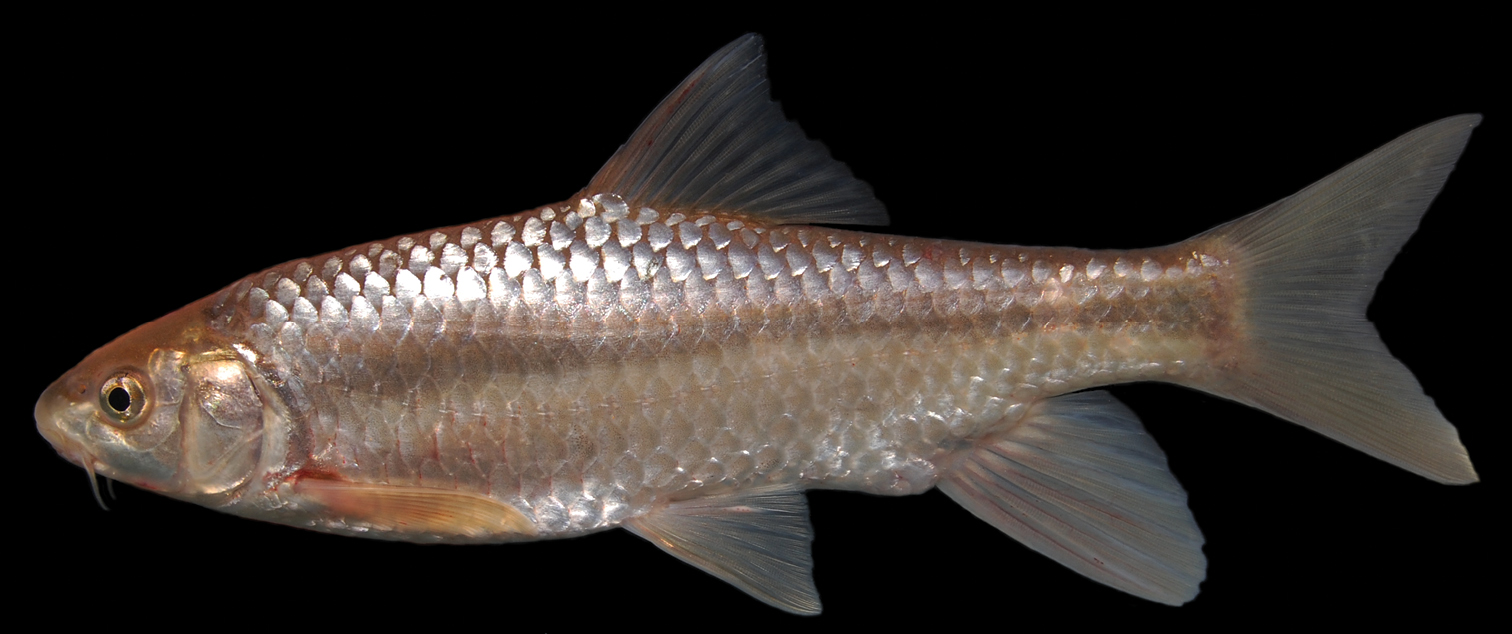

Conservation status
- Least Concern (IUCN 3.1)

Scientific classification
- Kingdom: Animalia
- Phylum: Chordata
- Class: Actinopterygii
- Order: Cypriniformes
- Family: Cyprinidae
- Subfamily: Torinae
- Genus: Carasobarbus
- Species: C. fritschii

Binomial name
- Carasobarbus fritschii (Günther, 1874)

Synonyms
- List: Barbus fritschii Günther, 1874; Labeobarbus fritschii (Günther, 1874); Pseudotor fritschii (Günther, 1874); Enteromius fritschii (Günther, 1874); Capoeta atlantica Boulenger, 1902; Barbus atlanticus (Boulenger, 1902); Varicorhinus atlanticus (Boulenger, 1902); Capoeta waldoi Boulenger, 1902; Barbus waldoi (Boulenger, 1902); Labeobarbus waldoi (Boulenger, 1902); Barbus riggenbachi Günther, 1902; Barbus paytonii Boulenger, 1911

= Carasobarbus fritschii =

Species of fish

Carasobarbus fritschii is a species of ray-finned fish in the family Cyprinidae. It is found only in the upper parts of the rivers of Morocco. Its natural habitat is rivers.

The taxonomy and systematics of the Maghreb barbs are subject to considerable dispute. Some authors consider B. paytonii a distinct species, while most include it in Carasobarbus fritschii.
