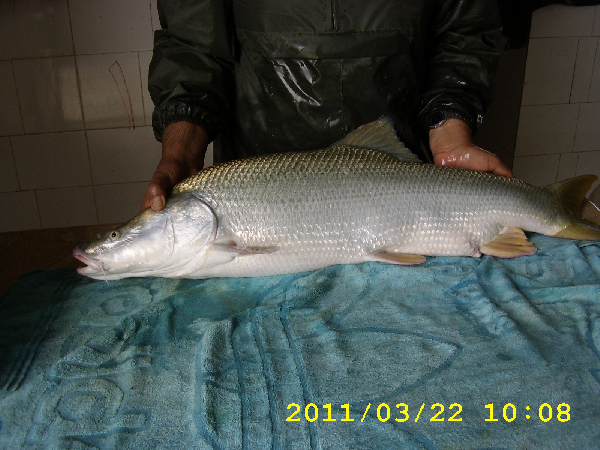

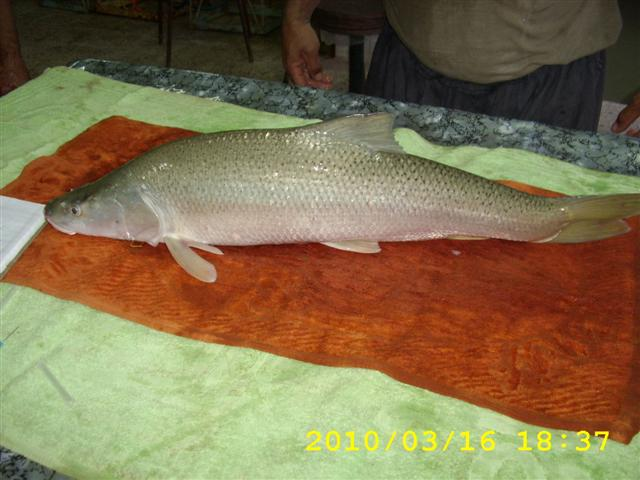

Conservation status
- Vulnerable (IUCN 3.1)

Scientific classification
- Kingdom: Animalia
- Phylum: Chordata
- Class: Actinopterygii
- Order: Cypriniformes
- Family: Cyprinidae
- Subfamily: Barbinae
- Genus: Luciobarbus
- Species: L. esocinus

Binomial name
- Luciobarbus esocinus Heckel, 1843

Synonyms
- Barbus esocinus (Heckel, 1843); Barbus euphrati (Sauvage, 1882); Labeobarbus euphrati Sauvage, 1882

= Mangar (fish) =

Species of fish

The mangar or pike barbel (Luciobarbus esocinus) is a large species of ray-finned fish in the genus Luciobarbus within the family Cyprinidae, native to the Tigris–Euphrates river system in Iran, Iraq, Syria and Turkey.

The species is highly prized as a food fish, but it has declined due to overfishing and habitat loss, making it vulnerable. It was well-known even in ancient times and there are illustrations from 1500–1000 BC showing Assyrian priests or deities dressed in the skin of mangar.

== Taxonomy ==
The mangar is the type species of Luciobarbus, which was established for it by Heckel in 1843. The species scientific name essentially means "pike-like pike-barbel" (after the northern pike, Esox lucius), though a more literal translation would be "pike-like wolf-barbel".

== Description ==
The species reaches a maximum length of up to 2.3 m (7.5 ft) and a weight of up to 140 kg (310 lb). A more typical size is 1–1.5 m (3.3–4.9 ft) and 60 kg (130 lb). It is considered one of the largest extant cyprinids (surpassed by the giant barb), and may live for up to at least 17 years. It has a large head, with a toothless mouth surrounded by four barbels. The silvery body is covered with small scales. There is only one dorsal fin, a pair of pectoral and ventral fins. The anal fin and tail they have yellowish tones.

== Distribution, habitat and behavior ==
The mangar occurs in the drainage basins of the Euphrates and Tigris rivers in Iran, Iraq, Syria, and Turkey. Adults keep to larger bodies of water such as large rivers and reservoir, migrating to smaller inflows to spawn.

The mangar has been recorded feeding on a wide range of animals, from zooplankton and invertebrate to fish and birds, but also phytoplankton. Fish typically make up about half its food.

== Conservation ==
The species is currently classified as Vulnerable by the IUCN. Although no reliable population data are available, reports and catches have declined severely in recent decades, and it is believed that most populations are heavily overfished. Although some locations still show abundant numbers, widespread exploitation as a major target for inland fisheries is considered a cause for concern.

The species has been bred in captivity and is considered to have potential in aquaculture.
