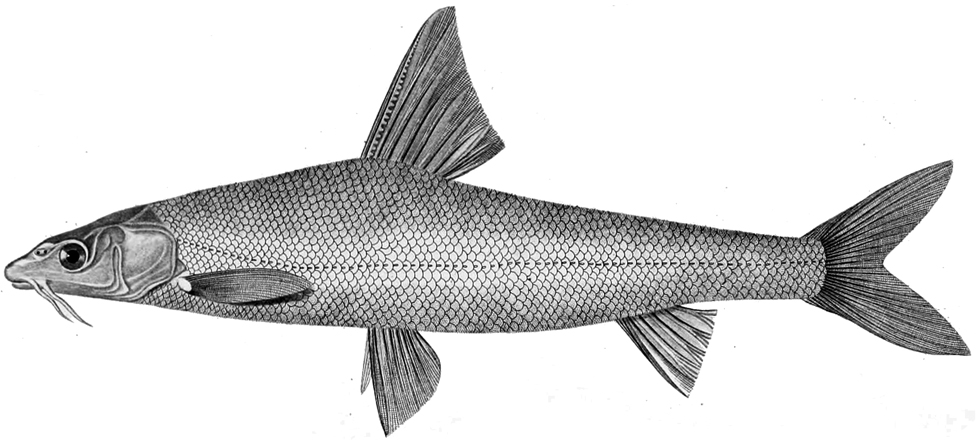

Conservation status
- Endangered (IUCN 3.1)

Scientific classification
- Kingdom: Animalia
- Phylum: Chordata
- Class: Actinopterygii
- Order: Cypriniformes
- Family: Cyprinidae
- Subfamily: Barbinae
- Genus: Luciobarbus
- Species: L. brachycephalus

Binomial name
- Luciobarbus brachycephalus Kessler, 1872

Synonyms
- Barbus brachycephalus Kessler, 1872

= Aral barbel =

Species of fish

The Aral barbel (Luciobarbus brachycephalus) is a species of ray-finned fish in the genus Luciobarbus. It is found in the Aral basin, Chu drainage and southern and western Caspian Sea. For spawning, it migrates up to larger tributaries of the western and southern coasts. It was formerly found in the Volga River system in South European Russia, but this population was extirpated during the mid-20th century.

It reaches a maximum length of 90 cm (35 in), with an average of 62 cm (24 in)–64 cm (25 in). It is popular as an aquarium fish, especially the albino variety, which is often kept as a tank mate with the Asian arowana. In the aquarium trade, it is marketed as the "Lucky Dragon" to align with the belief that the Asian arowana, or "dragon fish," brings good fortune and prosperity to its owner.
