= Maghreb barbel =

Scientific classification
- Kingdom: Animalia
- Phylum: Chordata
- Class: Actinopterygii
- Order: Cypriniformes
- Family: Cyprinidae
- Subfamily: Barbinae
- Genus: Luciobarbus
- Species: L. maghrebensis

Binomial name
- Luciobarbus maghrebensis Doadrio, Perea & Yahyaoui, 2015

Synonyms
- Barbus maghrebensis

Species of fish

The Maghreb barbel (Luciobarbus maghrebensis) is a ray-finned fish species in the family Cyprinidae. It is found in Morocco.

The taxonomy and systematics of the Maghreb barbs are subject to considerable dispute. Some authors consider L. maghrebensis a distinct species, while others include it in the Algerian barb (L. callensis). Furthermore, some taxonomists consider B. labiosa conspecific with L. maghrebensis when the latter is considered distinct. It is found in the Sebou basin and rivers flowing into the Moulay Bouselham Lagoon on the Atlantic slope in north-central Morocco.
