= Tropidophoxinellus chaignoni =

Conservation status
- Endangered (IUCN 3.1)

Scientific classification
- Kingdom: Animalia
- Phylum: Chordata
- Class: Actinopterygii
- Order: Cypriniformes
- Family: Leuciscidae
- Subfamily: Leuciscinae
- Genus: Tropidophoxinellus
- Species: T. chaignoni

Binomial name
- Tropidophoxinellus chaignoni (Vaillant, 1904)

Synonyms
- Leuciscus chaignoni Vaillant, 1904; Phoxinellus chaignoni (Vaillant, 1904)

Species of fish

Tropidophoxinellus chaignoni is a species of ray-finned fish in the family Leuciscidae. It is found in Tunisia. Its natural habitats are rivers and freshwater lakes.
