= Luciobarbus issenensis =

Conservation status
- Vulnerable (IUCN 3.1)

Scientific classification
- Kingdom: Animalia
- Phylum: Chordata
- Class: Actinopterygii
- Order: Cypriniformes
- Family: Cyprinidae
- Genus: Luciobarbus
- Species: L. issenensis

Binomial name
- Luciobarbus issenensis (Pellegrin, 1922)

Synonyms
- Barbus issenensis

Species of fish

Luciobarbus issenensis is a doubtfully distinct ray-finned fish species in the family Cyprinidae.

It is found only in Morocco. Its natural habitat is freshwater springs. It is threatened by habitat loss.

The taxonomy and systematics of the Maghreb barbs are subject to considerable dispute. Some authors consider L. issensis a distinct species, while others include it in the Algerian barb (Luciobarbus callensis).
