= Luciobarbus magniatlantis =

Conservation status
- Endangered (IUCN 3.1)

Scientific classification
- Kingdom: Animalia
- Phylum: Chordata
- Class: Actinopterygii
- Order: Cypriniformes
- Family: Cyprinidae
- Subfamily: Barbinae
- Genus: Luciobarbus
- Species: L. magniatlantis

Binomial name
- Luciobarbus magniatlantis Pellegrin, 1919

Synonyms
- Barbus magniatlantis

Species of fish

Luciobarbus magniatlantis, the Tensift riffle barbel, is a species in the family Cyprinidae. It is native to the Tensift River catchment of the Atlas Mountains of Morocco. However, it has been extirpated from the Rheraya River in the middle of its range, which has led to two isolated sub-populations.

Its natural habitat is freshwater riffles. It is considered an endangered species by the IUCN.

== Taxonomy and systematics ==
The taxonomy and systematics of the Maghreb barbs are subject to considerable dispute. Some authors consider L. magniatlantis a distinct species, while others include it in L. nasus, which is now extinct.

The specific epithet alludes to its High Atlas habitat.
