= Albanian barbel =

Conservation status
- Near Threatened (IUCN 3.1)

Scientific classification
- Kingdom: Animalia
- Phylum: Chordata
- Class: Actinopterygii
- Order: Cypriniformes
- Family: Cyprinidae
- Subfamily: Barbinae
- Genus: Luciobarbus
- Species: L. albanicus

Binomial name
- Luciobarbus albanicus (Steindachner, 1870)

Synonyms
- Barbus albanicus Steindachner, 1870 (but see text); Messinobarbus albanicus (Steindachner, 1870)

Species of fish

The Albanian barbel (Luciobarbus albanicus) is a species of freshwater ray-finned fish in the family Cyprinidae, which includes the carps and barbs. This species is found in the Western Balkans.

== Taxonomy ==
The Albanian barbel was first formally described in 1870 as Barbus albanicus by the Austrian ichthyologist Franz Steindachner with its type locality given as Lake Scutari in Albania, although it was actually Lake Ioannina in Greece. The Albanian barbel belongs to the genus Luciobarbus, commonly referred to as barbs, which belongs to the subfamily Barbinae of the family Cyprinidae.

== Etymology ==
The Albanian barbel belongs to the genus Luciobarbus, this name combines lucius, the Latin for pike, with the genus name Barbus, an allusion to the pike-like snout of the type species of the genus, Luciobarbus esocinus. The specific name, albanicus, means of Albania where the stated type locality, Lake Scutari, is located.

== Distribution and ecology ==
The Albanian barbel is restricted to the Southwestern Balkans. Here it occurs in southern Albania and northwestern Greece from the Vjosa River south to the Pineios River in the Peloponnese. Its range includes lakes Pamvotida, Amvrakia and Trichonida. Though its range is not large, it is quite abundant but considered a near threatened species by the IUCN.

The natural habitats of this fish are the lower course of rivers, lakes and water storage areas, over muddy or sandy bottom. Larvae and young fish gather in schools containing few if any other fishes in brackish bays and harbours. Adults are more solitary and live preferably in freshwater. L. albanicus is an omnivore, eating aquatic invertebrates (mainly insect larvae), algae and other plants, and detritus. They spawn in late spring to mid-summer (May to July) in slow-moving water over sandy ground at lake beaches and in river estuaries. A single female's eggs will be fertilised by the sperm of several (up to 7) males. This species becomes sexually mature at 3 or 4 years of age. It is long-lived, and can get up to 14 years old.
