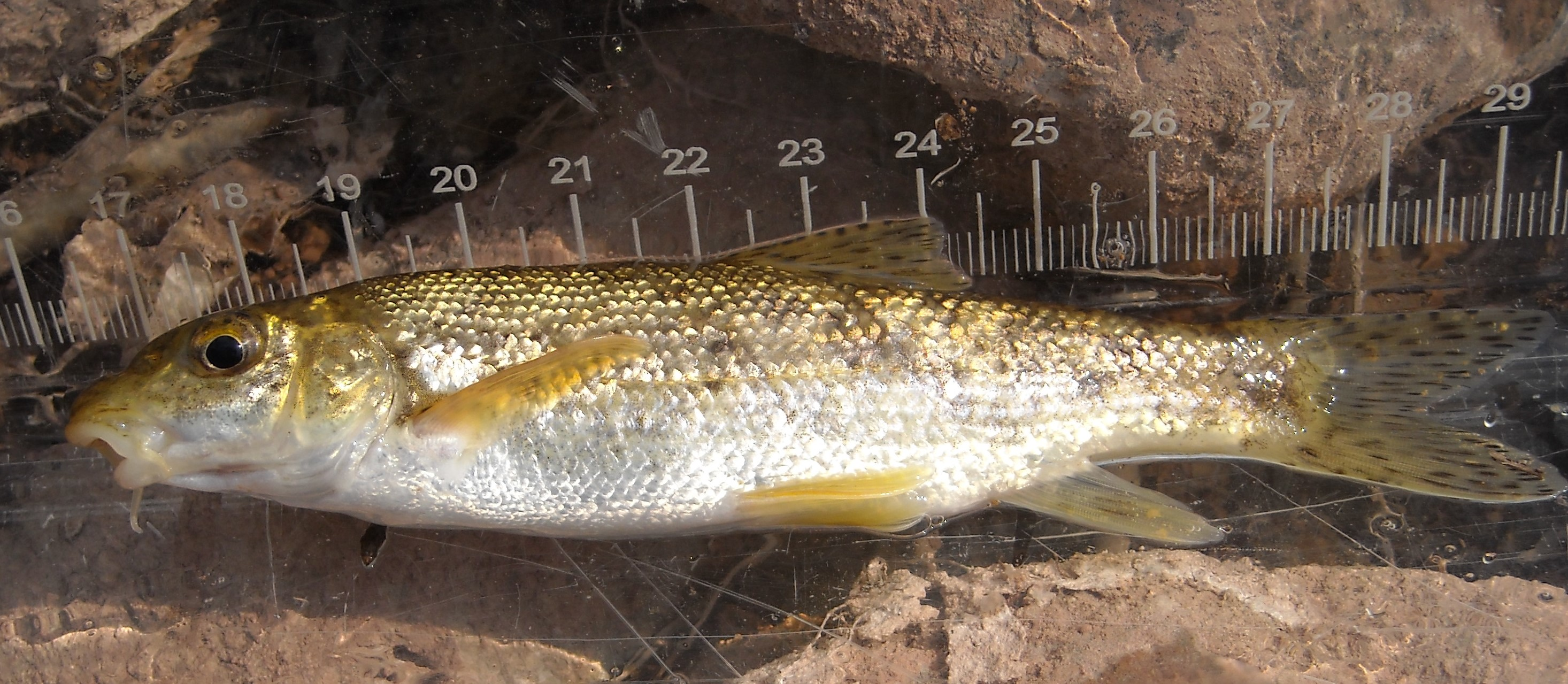

Conservation status
- Near Threatened (IUCN 3.1)

Scientific classification
- Kingdom: Animalia
- Phylum: Chordata
- Class: Actinopterygii
- Order: Cypriniformes
- Family: Cyprinidae
- Subfamily: Barbinae
- Genus: Barbus
- Species: B. meridionalis

Binomial name
- Barbus meridionalis A. Risso, 1827

= Mediterranean barbel =

Species of fish

The Mediterranean barbel or southern barbel (Barbus meridionalis) is a species of freshwater ray-finned fish in the family Cyprinidae, which includes the carps and barbs. This species is found in France and Spain.

== Taxonomy ==
The Mediterranean barbel was first formally described in 1827 by the French zoologist Antoine Risso with its type locality given as the Var River at Nice in Département des Alpes-Maritimes, France. belongs to the genus Barbus, commonly referred to as barbs, which belongs to the subfamily Barbinae of the family Cyprinidae.

== Etymology ==
The Mediterranean barbel belongs to the genus Barbus, this name being Latin for "beard" and the genus was named in 1805 by François Marie Daudin as a tautonym with the type species being Cyprinus barbus. This name may alo refer to the four barbels possessed by the common barbel, two at the tip of the snout and at one at each corner of mouth, it may also be derived from vernacular names, such as barbylle in Middle English and barbel in Old French. The specific name, meridionalis, means "Latin" or "southern", a reference to this species southerly or Mediterranean distribution.

== Description ==
The Mediterranean barbel has 3 or 4 spines and 7 to 9 soft rays in its dorsal fin while the anal fin has 2 or 3 spines and 5 or 6 soft rays. This species has between 44 and 48 scales along the lateral line and 24 to 28 scale rows around the caudal peduncle. The head, dorsum, flanks and fins are marked with large, irregular black dots. This species has a maximum standard length of 27 cm (11 in).

== Distribution and habitat ==
The Mediterranean barbel is found in south western Europe in the rivers draining into the Mediterranean Sea in northwestern Spain and southern France from the lower Rhône south to the Llobregat. It has been introduced the Garonne and may have been introduced to the Llobregat. It is a benthic species that occurs in the middle and upper reaches of rivers with a substrate of stones and rock and aquatic vegetation.
