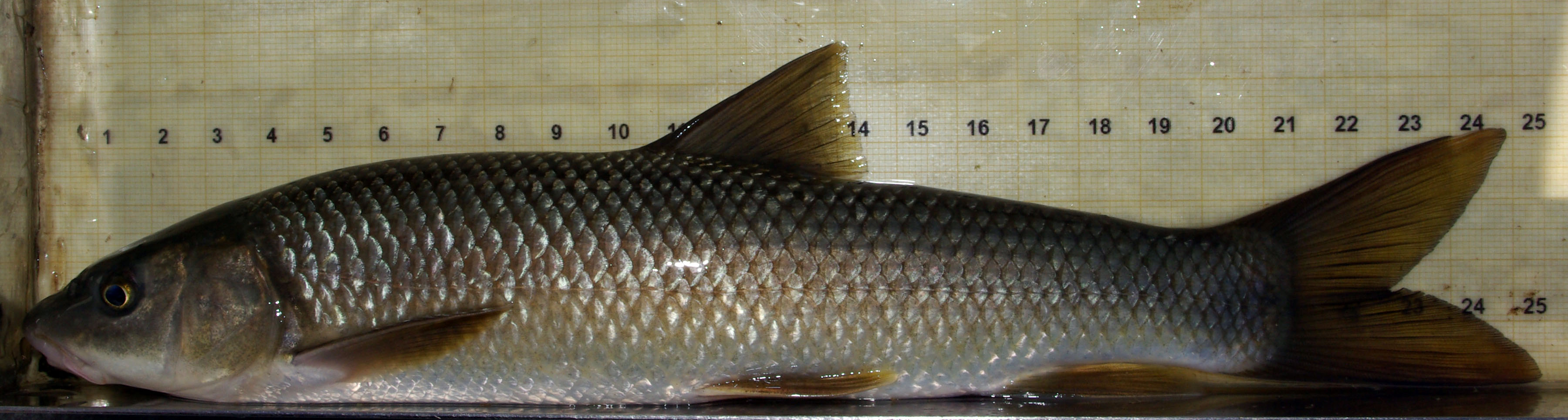
- Luciobarbus bocagei

Scientific classification
- Kingdom: Animalia
- Phylum: Chordata
- Class: Actinopterygii
- Division: Teleostei
- Order: Cypriniformes
- Family: Cyprinidae
- Subfamily: Barbinae
- Genus: Luciobarbus; Heckel, 1843

Type species
- Luciobarbus esocinus Heckel, 1843

Species
- see text

Synonyms
- Aspiobarbus Berg, 1933; Bertinichthys Whitley, 1953; Bertinius P.W. Fang,1943; Messinobarbus Bianco, 1998

= Luciobarbus =

Genus of fishes

Luciobarbus is a genus of ray-finned fishes in the family Cyprinidae. Its members are found in fresh and brackish waters of southern Europe, northern Africa, the wider Near East, the Aral and Caspian Seas, and rivers associated with these. Several species in the genus are threatened. Most species are fairly small to medium-sized cyprinids, but the genus also includes several members that can surpass 1 m (3.3 ft) in length and the largest, the mangar (L. esocinus) can reach 2.3 m (7.5 ft).

== Systematics ==
The type species is Luciobarbus esocinus, for which the genus was established by Heckel in 1843. The scientific name essentially means "pike-barbel" (after the northern pike, Esox lucius).

Like many other cyprinids, the present genus was long included in Barbus. It appears to be a very close relative of the typical barbels – which include that genus type species, Barbus barbus – and may well warrant inclusion in Barbus. Many modern authors prefer to consider it a subgenus instead. It is, moreover, not entirely clear what species to place in Luciobarbus if it is deemed valid. The IUCN argues for a rather inclusive circumscription. Nonwithstanding the taxonomy and systematics of this ill-defined assemblage, their closest living relative is probably Aulopyge huegelii.

== Species ==
Luciobarbus contains the following recognised species:

- Luciobarbus albanicus (Steindachner, 1870) (Albanian barbel)
- Luciobarbus amguidensis (Pellegrin, 1934)
- †Luciobarbus antinorii (Boulenger, 1911)
- Luciobarbus biscarensis (Boulenger, 1911)
- Luciobarbus bocagei (Steindachner, 1864)
- Luciobarbus brachycephalus (Kessler, 1872) (Aral barb)
- Luciobarbus callensis (Valenciennes, 1842) (Algerian barb)
- Luciobarbus capito (Güldenstädt, 1773) (Bulatmai barbel)
- Luciobarbus caspius (Berg, 1914) (Caspian barbel)
- Luciobarbus chelifensis Brahimi, Freyhof, Henrard & Libois, 2017
- Luciobarbus comizo (Steindachner, 1864) (Iberian barbel)
- Luciobarbus conocephalus (Kessler, 1872)
- Luciobarbus esocinus Heckel, 1843 (Mangar)
- Luciobarbus figuigensis (Pellegrin, 1913)
- Luciobarbus graecus (Steindachner, 1895)
- Luciobarbus graellsii (Steindachner, 1866)
- Luciobarbus guercifensis Doadrio, Perea & Yahyaoui, 2016 (Guercif barbel)
- Luciobarbus guiraonis (Steindachner, 1866)
- Luciobarbus issenensis (Pellegrin, 1922)
- Luciobarbus kersin (Heckel, 1843) (Kersin barbel)
- Luciobarbus ksibi (Boulenger, 1905)
- Luciobarbus lanigarensis Brahimi, Libois, Henrard & Freyhof, 2018
- Luciobarbus lepineyi (Pellegrin, 1939)
- Luciobarbus leptopogon G. H. W. Schimper, 1834
- Luciobarbus longiceps Valenciennes, 1842 (Jordan barbel)
- Luciobarbus lorteti (Sauvage 1882)
- Luciobarbus maghrebensis Doadrio, Perea & Yahyaoui, 2015 (Maghreb barbel)
- Luciobarbus magniatlantis (Pellegrin, 1920)
- Luciobarbus mascarensis Brahimi, Freyhof, Henrard & Libois, 2017
- Luciobarbus massaensis (Pellegrin, 1922)
- Luciobarbus microcephalus (Almaça (pt), 1967)
- Luciobarbus mursa (Güldenstädt, 1773)
- †Luciobarbus nasus (Günther, 1874)
- Luciobarbus numidiensis Brahimi, Libois, Henrard & Freyhof, 2018
- Luciobarbus pallaryi (Pellegrin, 1920)
- Luciobarbus pectoralis (Heckel, 1843) (Heckel's Orontes barbel)
- Luciobarbus rabatensis Doadrio, Perea & Yahyaoui, 2015 (Rabat barbel)
- Luciobarbus rifensis Doadrio, Casal-López & Yahyaoui, 2015 (Rifian barbel)
- Luciobarbus schejch (Heckel, 1843)
- Luciobarbus sclateri (Günther, 1868) (Andalusian barbel)
- Luciobarbus setivimensis (Valenciennes, 1842)
- Luciobarbus steindachneri (Almaça, 1967)
- Luciobarbus subquincunciatus (Günther, 1868) (Mesopotamian barbel)
- Luciobarbus xanthopterus Heckel, 1843 (Yellowfin barbel)
- Luciobarbus yahyaouii Doadrio, Casal-López & Perea, 2016 (Yahyaoui barbel)
- Luciobarbus zayanensis Doadrio, Casal-López & Yahyaoui 2016 (Zayan barbel)

Incertae sedis

- Luciobarbus bouramensis (Pellegrin, 1939)
- Luciobarbus labiosus (Pellegrin, 1922)
