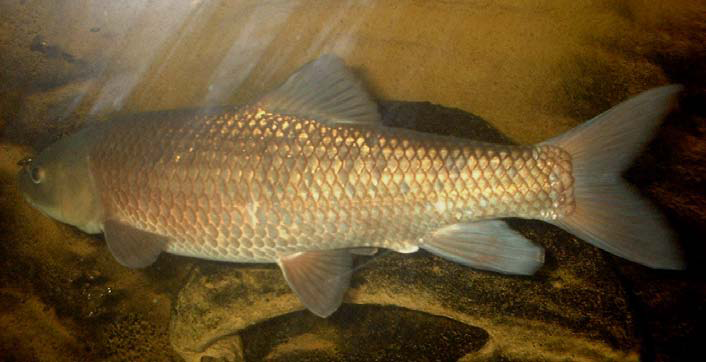

Conservation status
- Least Concern (IUCN 3.1)

Scientific classification
- Kingdom: Animalia
- Phylum: Chordata
- Class: Actinopterygii
- Order: Cypriniformes
- Family: Cyprinidae
- Subfamily: Barbinae
- Genus: Luciobarbus
- Species: L. callensis

Binomial name
- Luciobarbus callensis Valenciennes, 1842

Synonyms
- Barbus callensis Valenciennes, 1842; Luciobarbus ksibi (Boulenger, 1905); Barbus ksibi Boulenger, 1905; Barbus antinorii Boulenger, 1911; Luciobarbus bouramensis Pellegrin, 1939; Luciobarbus massaensis (Pellegrin, 1922); Barbus massaensis Pellegrin, 1922; Barbus issenensis Pellegrin, 1922; Barbus amguidensis Pellegrin, 1934

= Algerian barb =

Species of fish

The Algerian barb or Tunisian barb, (Luciobarbus callensis) is a ray-finned fish species in the family Cyprinidae. It is found in Algeria and Tunisia (and perhaps Morocco).

Its natural habitats are rivers, freshwater lakes, and water storage areas. It is not considered a threatened species by the IUCN.

The taxonomy and systematics of the Maghreb barbs are subject to considerable dispute. Some authors include B. antinorii, B. figuigensis, B. issenensis, B. ksibi, B. labiosa, B. lepineyi, B. massaensis, Carasobarbus moulouyensis, L. pallaryi and L. setivimensis in L. callensis, while others consider them distinct. To further confuse matters, Fishbase considers B. labiosa to be conspecific with the Maghreb barbel (L. maghrebensis), B. lepineyi to be conspecific with L. pallaryi when the latter is considered a distinct species, and C. moulouyensis be placed in the genus Carasobarbus.
