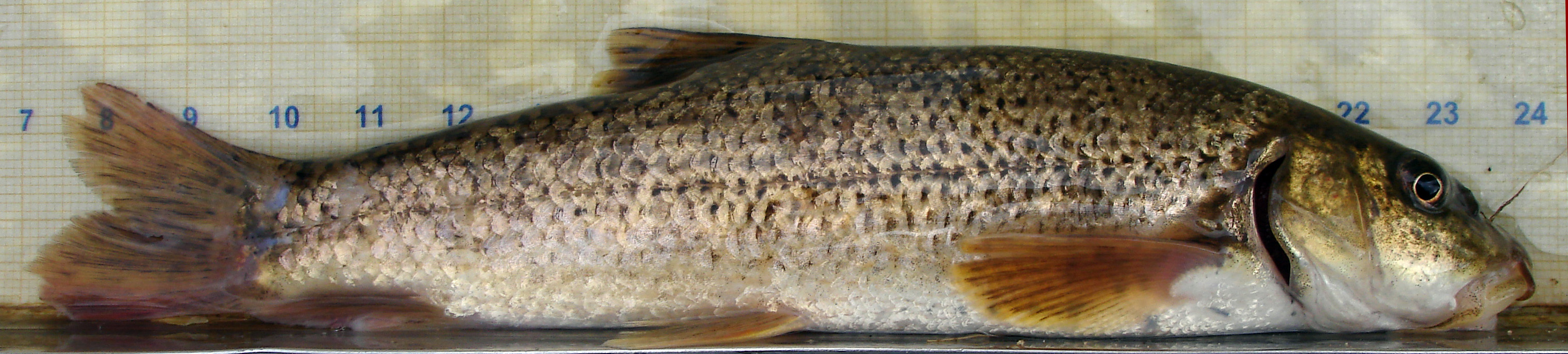

Conservation status
- Least Concern (IUCN 3.1)

Scientific classification
- Kingdom: Animalia
- Phylum: Chordata
- Class: Actinopterygii
- Order: Cypriniformes
- Family: Cyprinidae
- Subfamily: Barbinae
- Genus: Barbus
- Species: B. haasi

Binomial name
- Barbus haasi Mertens, 1925
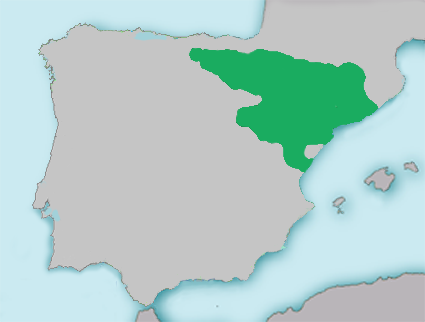

Synonyms
- Messinobarbus haasi (Mertens, 1925)

= Barbus haasi =

Species of fish

Barbus haasi, or the Catalonian barbel or redtail barb Catalan: barb cua-roig; Spanish: barbo colirrojo or barbo de cola roja), is a species of freshwater fish in the family Cyprinidae.

It is a small size barbel found only in the northeast of the Iberian Peninsula. Morphologically it is similar to Barbus bocagei, but it is smaller and rarely reaches sizes longer than 20 cm (8 in)

Its natural habitats are rivers and inland karsts in all the basin, but mainly in inner Catalonia, especially in the Bages comarca area.

The species is threatened by habitat loss and the introduction of non-native species such as the pumpkinseed (Lepomis gibbosus) and the Wels catfish (Silurus glanis).

== See also ==
- Luciobarbus bocagei, a more common and abundant related species.
