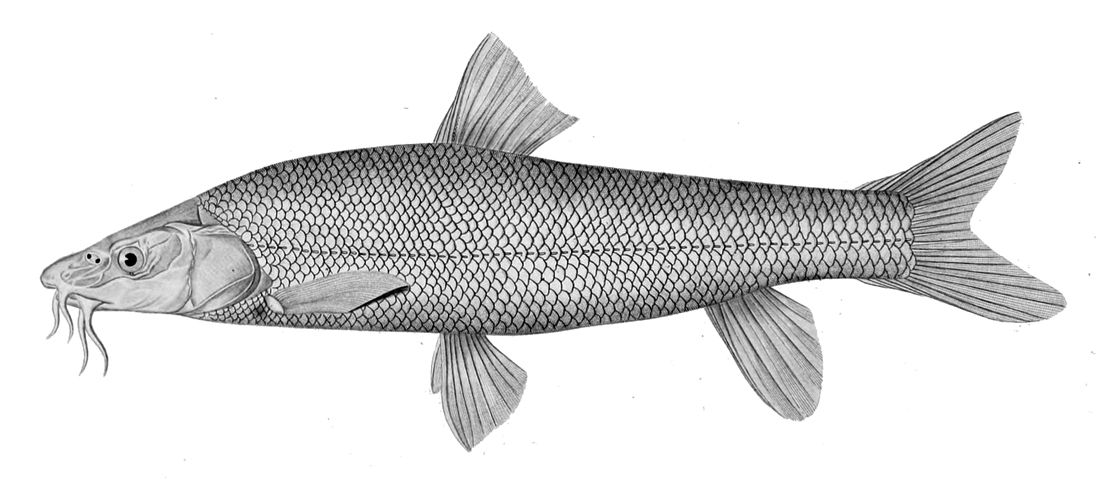

Conservation status
- Vulnerable (IUCN 3.1)

Scientific classification
- Kingdom: Animalia
- Phylum: Chordata
- Class: Actinopterygii
- Division: Teleostei
- Order: Cypriniformes
- Family: Cyprinidae
- Subfamily: Barbinae
- Genus: Luciobarbus
- Species: L. capito

Binomial name
- Luciobarbus capito (Güldenstädt, 1773)

Synonyms
- Barbus capito

= Bulatmai barbel =

Species of fish

The Bulatmai barbel (Luciobarbus capito) is a species of ray-finned fish in the genus Luciobarbus from the Aral and Caspian basins, including rivers that flow into these.
