= Water supply and sanitation in Spain =

Data
- Water coverage (broad definition): 100%
- Sanitation coverage (broad definition): 100%
- Share of collected wastewater treated: 77% (2005)
- Average urban water use (L/person/day): 157 (2007)
- Average urban water and sanitation tariff (US$/m^{3}): Euro 227/year
- Share of external financing: 0%
- Non-revenue water: 24% (2007)

Institutions
- Decentralization to municipalities: Full
- National water and sanitation company: None
- Water and sanitation regulator: None
- Responsibility for policy setting: Not clearly defined
- Sector law: None

Water supply and sanitation in Spain is characterized by universal access and good service quality, while tariffs are among the lowest in the EU. Almost half of the population is served by private or mixed private-public water companies, which operate under concession contracts with municipalities. The largest of the private water companies, with a market share of about 50% of the private concessions, is Aguas de Barcelona (Agbar). However, the large cities are all served by public companies except Barcelona and Valencia. The largest public company is Canal de Isabel II, which serves the metropolitan area of Madrid.

Droughts occasionally affect water supply in Southern Spain, resulting in their consideration of seawater desalination in order to meet water needs.

== Access ==
Access to water supply and sanitation in Spain is universal. 98% of the urban population and 93% of the rural population is connected to sewers, while the remainder is served by on-site sanitation systems such as septic tanks.

== Service quality ==
100.0% of the public tap water in Spain is considered potable (safe to drink) according to Ministerio de Sanidad that is responsible for the quality of the water. Every local provider has to report certified lab tests every 6 months resulting in over 40 million reports per year available from Sinac. Each water company is also obliged to provide a test report about the quality of the water when requested.

In 2009, the consumer organization OCU analyzed the presence of six pollutants in drinking water in 64 cities and towns. The pollutants were trihalomethane, volatile organic compounds, pesticides, nitrate, boron and polycyclic aromatic hydrocarbon. The analysis showed that drinking water had improved since the last report by OCU on drinking water in 2006. Problems were encountered only in Ourense (trihalomethane) and in Girona (pesticides).

OCU carried out another analysis in 2014 of 62 municipalities and cities and found that 7 had issues with contamination whereof one was major (Cáceres).

Concerning wastewater treatment, in 2005 77% of municipal wastewater was treated in accordance with standards set by the EU.

== Water resources ==
Southern Spain regularly suffers from severe droughts. The National Hydrological Plan (PHN by its Spanish acronym, from Plan Hidrológico Nacional) foresaw substantial investments into the transfer of surface water from the Ebro River south to cities on the Mediterranean coast. However, in 2004, these plans have been shelved by the newly elected Spanish government in favor of seawater desalination, adding to 700 existing desalination plants.

Data about water sources and use vary according to the source of information. According to the utility association ASOAGA, about 74% of municipal water supply originates in surface water, only 19% in groundwater, and 7% in springs and desalination. However, according to a 2007 survey by the National Statistical Institute, 63% of the water distributed by utilities came from surface water, 33% from groundwater, and 4% from other sources such as desalination. According to the utility association ASOAGA, water use is about 280 liter per capita and day (L/c/d). This figure may include non-revenue water. A survey by the International Water Association (IWA) in four Spanish cities gives water use as between 169 L/c/d in Valencia and 192 L/c/d in Valencia, including industrial water use. These usage levels are similar to the average of OECD countries. The National Statistical Institute gives an average water consumption of 157 L/c/d, varying between 125 L/c/d in the Basque country to 189 L/c/d in Cantabria.

About 20% of treated wastewater in Spain is being reused (this is also called reclaimed water), primarily for irrigation and landscaping.

== Responsibility for water supply and sanitation ==
=== Policy and regulation ===
A cornerstone of the legal framework for water supply and sanitation is the 1985 Water Law (Ley de Aguas). Policy and regulation functions for water supply and sanitation are shared among various Ministries. For example, the Ministry of Environment is in charge of water resources management and the Ministry of Health is in charge of drinking water quality monitoring.

Basin Agencies (Confederaciones de Cuencas Hidrográficas) are in charge of planning, constructing and operating major water infrastructure such as dams; elaborating basin plans; setting water quality targets, as well as monitoring and enforcing them; granting permits to use water, as well as inspecting water facilities for which permits were granted; undertaking hydrological studies; and to provide advisory services to other entities at their request. Basin Agencies are headed by a President who is nominated by the Cabinet at the proposal of the Minister of Environment. Each agency has a Board, a user assembly and a council to ensure broad participation by various stakeholders in its decision-making process, both in planning and operations. There are a total of 15 Basin Agencies in Spain for rivers that flow through more than one autonomous community. If a river runs entirely within the territory of an autonomous community the water administration of the respective autonomous community, instead of one of the basin agencies, is in charge of managing its water resources. This is the case in Galicia, Catalonia, the Balearic Islands, the Canary Islands, the Basque country and Andalusia.

While basin agencies do not provide water and sanitation services, they play an important role in determining the framework for the provision of such services.

=== Service provision ===
Service provision is the responsibility of more than 8,000 municipalities. Municipalities can provide services directly or through a municipal public company (54% of market share), or through concessions to a mixed public-private company (13%) or a private company (33%). In some cities water supply is the responsibility of a company, while sanitation services are provided directly by the municipality. This is the case, for example, in Barcelona.

The main water service provider in Spain is Aguas de Barcelona (Agbar), a private company that provides water services to about 13 million people in more than 1,000 localities under concession contracts. Sewer services are provided to 8.25 million people in 365 localities, and wastewater treatment is carried out for 9.3 million people in 445 localities. Its main competitor is Aqualia. The largest public water company is Canal Isabel II that serves the metropolitan area of Madrid. The government of the Madrid region plans to sell 49% of the shares of the company to private investors since 2008, but has not done so until early 2015.

=== Corruption ===
In February 2013, the director of Agbar’s Aquagest concession in Santiago de Compostela was jailed because of alleged bribes to municipal officials to ensure the renewal of his firm's contract. In June 2014 25 prominent Valencian politicians and administrators were charged with "fraudulently obtaining €23 million between 2004 and 2009 by inflating the cost of treating sewage sludge from metropolitan Valencia’s wastewater treatment plant", operated at the time by the public company EMARSA, a subsidiary of the regional wastewater company EMARSA.

As of 2016 there were numerous ongoing investigations into alleged corruption in the awarding of municipal water contracts. In January 2016, top executives of the Spanish water companies Acciona and FCC were arrested amid these investigations. Furthermore, the Director General and other senior employees of the government water procurement agency Acuamed were arrested. Acuamed, an agency under the supervision of the Ministry of Environment, is in charge of major infrastructure programs financed by the central government, including desalination plants.

=== Reform proposals ===
It is common practice in Spain that municipalities legally request upfront payments (canon) when awarding water concessions. These funds are not used for water infrastructure, but to generate revenue for the municipality. Also, not all contracts are awarded through competitive bidding. For example, in 2012 the Barcelona metropolitan authority awarded a 35-year concession worth an estimated €330 million to Agbar without a competitive tender. Roque Gistau, president of the Spanish water and sanitation association (AEAS), says that the current system to award contracts must be reformed. He calls for the abolishment of the Canon because it distorts the market. He also calls for the establishment of a water regulator such as the ones existing in England and Portugal.

== History and recent developments ==
Spain was one of the first countries in the world to create river basin agencies through a Royal Decree-Law published in 1926. The first river basin agencies (Confederaciones Hidrográficas) were created in the Ebro basin and in the Segura basin in 1926, followed by the Guadalquivir in 1927 and the Eastern Pyrenees in 1929. Until 1961 basin agencies were created in the entire country.

The management of water resources in Spain during much of the 20th century has been characterized by strong state intervention. This intervention focused on the construction of hydraulic works in an effort to increase water available for irrigation (supply policy) and hydropower generation, was considered the engine of Spanish economic development policy. The Plans of Hydraulic Works of 1902 and 1933, financed for the most part by the state, are an example of this type of policy. Until 1955 a growth rate of about 4 dams per year was maintained, going from about 60 dams existing at the beginning of the century up to about 270 in 1950. From that year the pace accelerated considerably, reaching an average of 20 annual dams, until reaching the infrastructure existing today.

The Law of Water of 1866 represents the first attempt to regulate Spanish territorial waters specifically, although it did not come into force due to the revolutionary period that gave rise to the first republic. Its basic principles, however, are the basis largely of the Law of 1879, including the public domain of all natural streams and river banks. Ground waters, which belong to the owner of the land where they were found, were not included. This provision continued in force until its retroactive amendment by the 1985 Law, and is one of the causes of the current situation of lack of administrative control of groundwater sources.

The Law of 1879, includes the right to private use of water linked to an administrative concession. The Law regulates in a very precise way both the procedure and the general rules on the concession of public waters as well as specific provisions for the different uses (supply to populations, irrigations, industrial establishments, etc.). In the case of irrigation, in addition, the right to use water is linked to that of land ownership. Likewise, the Law establishes the community of irrigators, an institution that is self-governing and has sanctioning power. The subsequent evolution of water towards multipurpose uses and the concurrence of several users over the same water body have expanded the figure of the irrigation community to the current user communities.

The Regulation of the Law of 1879 never came into practice and this normative element was replaced by several provisions of lower rank that tried to solve the numerous problems that were arising in the application of the Law due both to the wide field covered by this law, the prolonged validity that faced it with situations for which it were not effective.

The most important of the normative novelties is the one that refers to the creation, or rather the institutionalization of an existing reality, of the basin organisms, with the creation of the first hydrographic confederation in 1926 as the overarching organ of management of the water to Level of basin. The functions of basin organizations have been alternated between the specific ones of development and more general of water management during the last century.

William Blomquist, in a study of hydrographic confederations in 2005, shows that the formal structure of these organizations traditionally gives more weight to user groups for irrigation, leaving public or private organizations representing urban centers or environmental issues in a background. Similarly, some confederations continue to emphasize their advocacy tasks while adapting to fully manage, in a broad sense, their water resources.

== Efficiency ==
A survey by the National Statistical Institute estimates the average level of non-revenue water at 24% 2007, including real (physical) losses of 16% and apparent losses due to undermetering and other factors of 8%.

== Tariffs and cost recovery ==
Tariff level. A survey commissioned by the utility association AEAS in 2009 showed that the average tariff for water supply and sanitation was Euro 1.50/m3. On average, industrial users paid Euro 1.81/m3 and residential users Euro 1.40/m3. This is one of the lowest water tariffs in the EU. There are large variations between cities and regions. The province with the highest average tariff are the Balearic Islands (Euro 2.65/m3) and the region with the lowest is Lugo (Euro 0.61/m3). The study commissioned by AEAS wants to shed light on the actual cost of water and make citizens aware of the need to pay the full costs of this service. According to a survey carried out in 2009 by the Spanish consumer organization OCU the water bill was slightly higher than in the ANEAS survey at Euro 227 per year for a water consumption of 175 m^{3}. However, the survey shows a slightly lower average water and sewer tariff at Euro 1.30/m3. The OCU survey also shows that annual bills vary substantially between cities, ranging from 112 to 413 Euro per year. According to another survey, an international water tariff survey by the International Water Association (IWA), the annual water and sewer bill of a household using 200 m^{3} per year was US$300 per year, or US$25 per month. This was the second lowest bill among 12 EU countries included in the survey.

Affordability. The AEAS study says that a cup of coffee costs as much as 2.3 days of water supply. The average water and sanitation bill of Euro 191 per year accounts for only 0.6% of household expenditures.

Tariff structure. 92% of Spanish cities used increasing-block tariffs, i.e. the tariff per cubic meter increases as consumption increases. Many cities had a large fixed fee that included a consumption of between 60 and 180 cubic meter per year, thus providing no financial incentive to save water below this level.

Cost recovery. The Ministry of Environment estimates the cost recovery for water supply and sanitation at "between 50% and 90%". However, independent sources estimate it to be as low as 30%.

== Investment and financing ==
Investment. According to a blog on "Sustainable Spain", Spain spends €6,330 million annually on the capture, transport and extraction of underground water, plus water distribution and sanitation. However, the industry association AGA estimates investments by its members, which supply water to 75% of the population, at "more than €290 million" annually.

Financing. The European Union is a major financier of the Spanish water and sanitation sector, both through grants by the European Commission and through loans from the European Investment Bank. Between 1986 and 2008 Spain received Euro 21 billion in EU funding for water infrastructure. However, European funding to Spain is set to fall by 40% in the period to 2013, compared with 2000-2006. "Europe's generosity has contributed to the unsustainability of the Spanish water sector's economic model", says Enrique Cabrera of the Universidad Politécnica de Valencia. Investments are also financed through loans and bonds, such as a $500 million bond issue by Canal Isabel II in 2015.

== See also ==
- Ebro Hydrographic Confederation
- Water supply and sanitation in the European Union
