= Luciobarbus graecus =

Conservation status
- Least Concern (IUCN 3.1)

Scientific classification
- Kingdom: Animalia
- Phylum: Chordata
- Class: Actinopterygii
- Order: Cypriniformes
- Family: Cyprinidae
- Subfamily: Barbinae
- Genus: Luciobarbus
- Species: L. graecus

Binomial name
- Luciobarbus graecus Steindachner, 1896

Synonyms
- Barbus graceus Steindachner, 1895 (lapsus); Barbus graecus Steindachner, 1896; Luciobarbus kottelati Turan, Ekmekçi, Ilhan & Engin, 2008; Luciobarbus lydianus Boulenger, 1896; Messinobarbus carottae Bianco 1998 (p.p.)

Species of fish

Luciobarbus graecus is a ray-finned fish species in the family Cyprinidae. It is here placed in Luciobarbus following the IUCN, but that genus is very closely related to the other typical barbels and perhaps better considered a mere subgenus of Barbus. Found in and adjacent to Greece, its closest living relative seems to be L. lydianus, which is found in the northwest of Asia Minor.

It is a large barbel and can grow to almost 70 cm (28 in) long, though a typical adult is much smaller, at 10 to 20 cm (3.9 to 7.9 in) standard length. The lateral line extends along the whole body, which is rather large-scaled, with usually 45 to 46 scales along the lateral line, 8 rows above it and 6 rows below. The pectoral fins usually have 17 fin rays. Its fins tend to be larger on average than in its relatives, and the anal fin usually begins somewhat closer to the fairly blunt (for a Luciobarbus) snout. Its eyes are large and the head is high and narrow by the standards of its genus. Like its relatives, it has four barbels, but these are slightly shorter on average than in its relatives. Unlike in L. lydianus, its lips are not markedly swollen and of equal size; it also lacks the black spot at the root of each body scale, but has a rather prominent black rim to each body scale. It is otherwise unmarked greyish-brown above, on the sides and on most fins, and pale yellowish below and on the ventral and anal fins.

This species mainly occurs in Greece, but its range barely seems to extend into Albania. It is found in the Spercheios River drainage basin. It also occurs in the Cephissus River and in Lake Yliki. This latter lacustrine population was redescribed in 1998 as Messinobarbus carottae. In former times it was found in Lake Paralimni, but this has been drained. It inhabits lakes and slow-moving rivers. Spawning occurs in June over sandy ground.

Only found in a limited area, its stocks have declined significantly due to habitat destruction and overuse of water for agriculture, water pollution, and overfishing. It is protected by law, but enforcement is considered inefficient. The species is classified as Least Concern by the IUCN.
