= Leucos ylikiensis =

Conservation status
- Endangered (IUCN 3.1)

Scientific classification
- Kingdom: Animalia
- Phylum: Chordata
- Class: Actinopterygii
- Order: Cypriniformes
- Family: Leuciscidae
- Subfamily: Leuciscinae
- Genus: Leucos
- Species: L. ylikiensis

Binomial name
- Leucos ylikiensis (Economidis, 1991)

Synonyms
- Rutilus ylikiensis Economidis (ex Stephanidis), 1991

Species of fish

Leucos ylikiensis, the Yliki roach, is a species of freshwater ray-finned fish belonging to the family Leuciscidae, which includes the daces, Eurasian minnows and related fishes. This species is endemic to Central mainland Greece.

== Taxonomy ==
Leucos ylikiensis first appeared in the literature as Rutilus aula rubella var. ylikiensis in Poissons d'eau douce de l'Atticobéotie, published in 1939 by the Greek ichthyologist Alexander I. Stephanidis, but as this name was being applied to a taxon below the level of subspecies, it was unavailable under the International Code of Zoological Nomenclature. It was formally described as Rutilus ykiliensis in 1991 by Panos Stavros Economidis, with its type locality given as "several lakes in Greece". It is now classified as a valid species in the genus Leucos within the subfamily Leuciscinae of the family Leuciscidae.

== Etymology ==
Leucos ylikiensis belongs to the genus Leucos. This name is derived from the Greek leukos, which means "white". The genus was named by Johann Jakob Heckel. He did not explain why he chose this name, but it may refer to the silvery colour of Squalius aula. The specific name, ylikiensis, means "belonging to Yliki", i.e Lake Yliki, part of the type locality.

== Description ==
Leucos ylikiensis has 12 soft rays supporting the dorsal fin and 11 supporting the anal fin. One feature which distinguishes the Achelous roach from other species in the genus Leucos is its moderate size, almost never exceeding 12 or 13 cm (4.7 or 5.1 in), standard length. It is also separable by the lack of a dark midlateral band, the peritoneal membrane being covered in a dense pattern of black melanophores, and the lateral line having 42 or 43 pored scales. However, the number of gill rakers is the most notable feature, with this species having a total of 18 to 20, compared to 8 to 16 in other white roaches. The maximum published fork length for this species is 28.5 cm (11.2 in).

== Distribution and habitat ==
Leucos ylikiensis is endemic to Boeotia in Central Greece, where it is found in the Cephissus River and in lakes Yliki and Paralimni, with an introduced population in Lake Marathon reservoir north of Athens. This species is regarded as a relict of the fauna of the large Lake Copais, which was drained in the late 19th century. This species is found in the pelagic zone of the lakes it occurs in.

== Conservation ==
Leucos ylikiensis is classified as Endangered by the International Union for Conservation of Nature. It is threatened by habitat degradation by water abstraction and pollution, as well as by overfishing and the introduction of invasive fishes. Climate change-induced extended droughts are also thought to be a threat.
