= Paskóviza =

Conservation status
- Endangered (IUCN 3.1)

Scientific classification
- Kingdom: Animalia
- Phylum: Chordata
- Class: Actinopterygii
- Order: Cypriniformes
- Family: Leuciscidae
- Subfamily: Leuciscinae
- Genus: Telestes
- Species: T. beoticus

Binomial name
- Telestes beoticus (Stephanidis, 1939)

Synonyms
- Rutilus beoticus Stephanidis, 1939; Pseudophoxinus beoticus (Stephanidis, 1939)

Species of fish

The paskóviza (Telestes beoticus), or Boeotian riffle dace, is a species of freshwater ray-finned fish belonging to the family Leuciscidae, which includes the daces, Eurasian minnows and related species. This fish is endemic to central mainland Greece.

== Taxonomy ==
The paskóviza was first formally described as Rutilus beoticus in 1939 by the Greek ichthyologist Alexander I. Stephanidis with its type locality given as Lake Yliki in Greece. This species is now classified in the genus Telestes which was proposed as a subgenus of Leuciscus in 1840 by Charles Lucien Bonaparte and is classified within the subfamily Leuciscinae in the Family Leuciscidae.

== Etymology ==
The paskóviza is a member of the genus Telestes but Bonaparte did not explain the etymology of this name. It may be from teléstēs, Greek for "completer" or "finisher", if this is the case then what the name alludes to is not clear. In 1877 David Starr Jordan said that the name is derived form téleios, which means "perfect" or "spotless", although nothin in Bonaparte's description of the subgenus supports Jordan's view. Telestes was also a king of Corinth who was murdered in 748 B.C.E. and there was a 5th century B.C.E. Greek poet called Telestes too. The specific name, beoticus, means "of Boeotia", the region of Greece that contains the type locality.

== Description ==
The paskóviza is told apart from other Telestes daces by the depth of the caudal peduncle, in this species it is depth is slightly less than twice its length; having between 50 and 55 scales along the lateral line; having between 7 and 8 1/2 branched rays in its anal fin; it has an indistinct grey midlateral stripe formed by a dark spot on almost every scale along the sides. This species has a maximum total length of 13 cm (5.1 in).

== Distribution and habitat ==
The paskóviza is endemic to Greece where it is found in the catchments of the Asopos and Cephissus rivers, including Lakes Yliki and Paralimni. It probably inhabited the now drained Lake Copais before its drainage in the late 19th Century. This species occurs in the perennial reaches of rivers, streams fed by springs and in drainage canals, it prfers to be close to or within cover auch as submerged or riparian vegetation and woody structures. Lake populations are thought to live in the littoral zones of lakes.

== Conservation ==
The paskóviza is classified as Endangered by the International Union for Conservation of Nature. The threats to this species include pollution, water abstraction and anthropogenic habitat modification.
