= Scardinius graecus =

Conservation status
- Vulnerable (IUCN 3.1)

Scientific classification
- Kingdom: Animalia
- Phylum: Chordata
- Class: Actinopterygii
- Order: Cypriniformes
- Family: Leuciscidae
- Subfamily: Leuciscinae
- Genus: Scardinius
- Species: S. graecus

Binomial name
- Scardinius graecus Stephanidis, 1937

Species of fish

Scardinius graecus, the Greek rudd or Yliki rudd, is a species of freshwater ray-finned fish belonging to the family Leuciscidae, which includes the daces, Eurasian minnows and related fishes. This species is endemic to Central Greece.

== Taxonomy ==
Scardinius graecus was first formally described in 1937 by the Greek ichthyologist Alexander I. Stephanidis with its type locality given as Lake Yliki near Thebes in Greece. This species belongs to the genus Scardinius, commonly referred to as rudds, which belongs to the subfamily Leuciscinae of the family Leuciscidae.

== Etymology ==
Scardinius graecus belongs to the genus Scardinius and this name is thought to be a latinisation of scardafa, a vernacular name in Italy, Rome in particular, for the Tiber rudd (Scardinius scardafa). The Specific name, graecus, means "Greece", the country this fish is endemic to.

== Description ==
Scardinius graecus may de told apart from other Balkan rudd species by having between 38 and 43 scales along its lateral line; the anal fin typically has 11 1/2 branched fin rays; there are between 14 and 18 pectoral fin rays; 17 to 24 gill rakers; the dorsal profile of the head is clearly concave, the snout with its tip level with the centre of the eye; the eye is close to the dorsal profile of the head in lateral view; the articulation of lower jaw is in below or behind of the middle of the eye; and the length of the head is equivalent to 24 to 35% of the standard length. The Greek rudd has a maximum total length of 40 cm (16 in), although 25 cm (9.8 in) is more typical.

== Distribution and habitat ==
Scardinius graecus is endemic to Boeotia in central Greece, being a remnant of the fish fauna that was found in Lake Copais which was drained in the 19th Century. Their modern distribution is in the drainage system of the Cephissus (Boeotia) River including Lakes Yliki and Paralimni. It has also been introduced in to the reservoirs at Beletsi and Marathon. In lakes the Greek rudd is mainly found in the pelagic zone.

== Conservation ==
Scardinius graecus is classified as Endangered by the International Union for Conservation of Nature. The threats to this species include water abstraction, pollution and climate change.

== Sources ==
- Froese, Rainer; Pauly, Daniel (eds.). "Scardinius graecus". FishBase.
