= Gla =

Mycenaean Greek city

Coordinates: 38°29′00″N 23°10′56″E

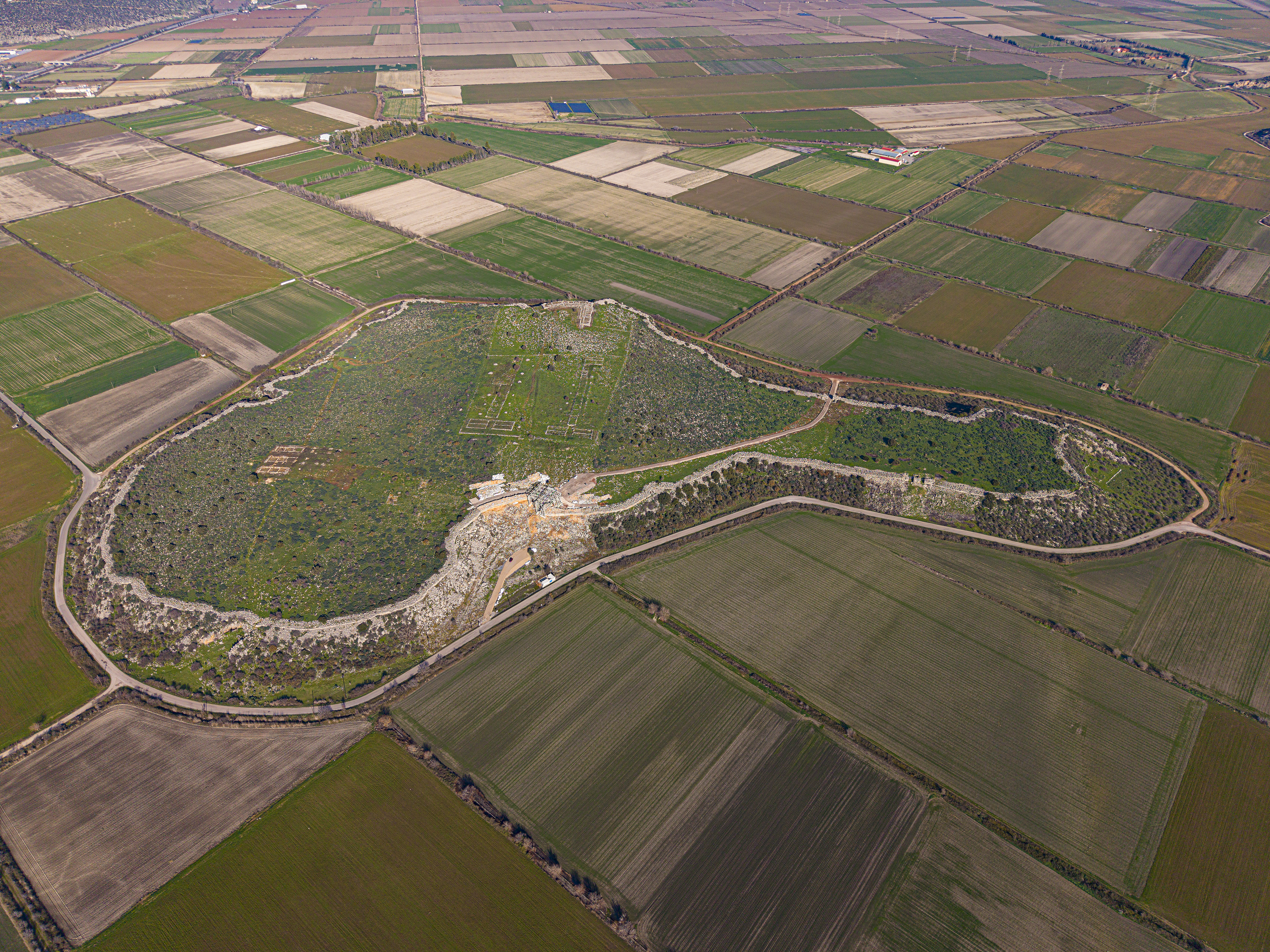
Mycenaean Acropolis of Gla.

Gla (Greek: Γλα), also called Glas (Γλας), was an important fortified site of the Mycenaean civilization, located in Boeotia, mainland Greece. Despite its impressive size, more than ten times larger than contemporary Athens or Tiryns, Gla is not mentioned in the Iliad, or perhaps is referred to by a name as yet unidentified.

== Description ==
=== Name ===
The ancient name of the site is unknown since despite much speculation, it has not been identified with any of the placenames mentioned in the Iliad. The modern population calls the site Palaiokastro (Greek: Παλαιόκαστρο "ancient fortress"). The name Gla comes from the Arvanitic goulas (γουλάς), ultimately borrowed from Turkish kulle 'tower'. There is also a settlement on the south side of the former Lake Kopais named Goulas (Γουλάς). On occasion Gla has been linked to the as-yet unidentified city of Arne from the Homeric "Catalogue of Ships", though this association has been disputed by George Mylonas, among others.

=== Location ===
The site is located on a limestone outcrop or hill that jutted into Lake Kopais (now drained) or formed an island within it. The flat-topped outcrop rises up to 38m above the surrounding area. It measures circa 900 x 575m (at the widest point).

=== Size ===
Excavation revealed much detail about the fortification walls (which were always visible) and, on the interior, remains of buildings from the Mycenaean period. The fortification encloses an area of nearly 20 hectares, about 10 times as much as the Mycenaean citadels of Athens or Tiryns.

=== Walls ===
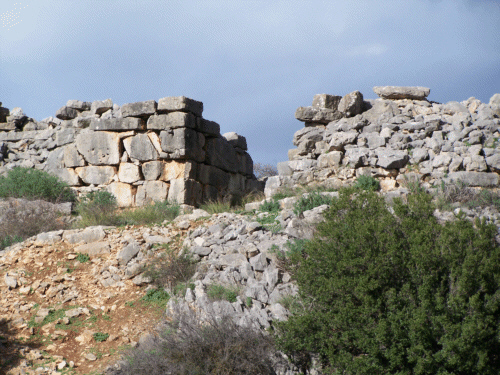
The south gate, external view (note ashlar masonry)

The walls surrounding Gla were about 3 m thick, and 2.8 km long, enclosing about 235,000 square meters of land. These massive walls were made from Cyclopean masonry. In many locations they are built directly on the cliffs that form the limit of the outcrop. It had four gates, an unusually large number for a Mycenaean fortification, in the north, west, south and southeast. Elaborate built ramps led to the gates. The fortification can be dated to early Late Helladic III B, that is, circa 1300 BC.

Within the walls, there was thought to be a palatial complex, but recent evidence has pointed in the direction of a military establishment with much storage space. Of all the space that is enclosed within the walls of Gla, there are very few permanent structures, and they take up less than a quarter of the space inside the walls. Some of this empty space possibly was used to house temporary structures, especially in times when there was construction and draining in progress.

=== Draining of the Kopais ===
Much of the area within the walls is vacant, leading archaeologists to believe that it served as a refuge for farmers in the area of Lake Kopais in the event of attack. It is suggested that the land dominated by the citadel of Gla served as the "bread basket" of the Mycenaean world. This is supported by the fact that Lake Kopais, the largest lake in southern Greece, had been drained by a system of dams and canals (one of the most astonishing achievements of prehistoric engineering) at about the same time as the erection of Gla, producing a large fertile plain. The drainage system collapsed from destruction or neglect at or after the end of Mycenaean Civilisation; in Classical Antiquity, the lake existed again. It was drained a second time in the 19th century.

The system comprised two large canals that met about 1 km north of Gla. These canals combined covered over 50 km in length, and collected water from the Boeotian Cephissus and Melas rivers and redistributed them into areas where the water flowed out to sea easily.

== Interior structures ==
=== Palace ===
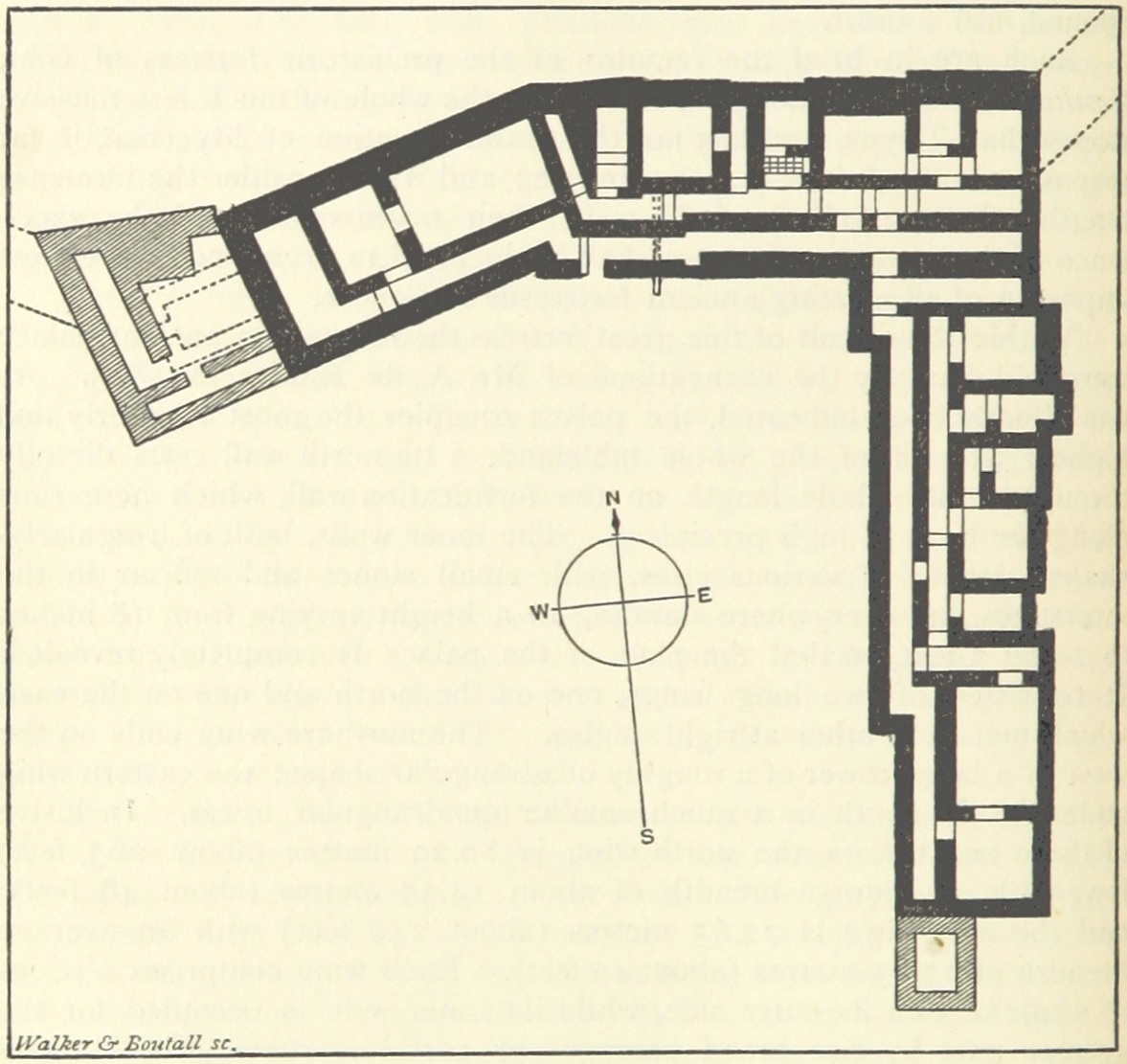
Plan of the L-shaped palace of Gla

The most striking interior feature is a large L-shaped building, often described as a "palace". It is in the north of the site, which is subdivided by several internal walls in this area. The "palace" is located on an artificial terrace and consists of three wings. Each of the wings contains mostly very small rooms, arranged in groups of six and accessed by corridors. At the two ends of the L, there are similar arrangements of rooms resembling the megaron complexes known from Tiryns, Mycenae Dimini and Pylos. Nevertheless, the lack of several typical features of other Mycenaean palaces, namely of a "throne room", a (circular) hearth and a "bathroom" casts some doubt on the designation of the structure as a palace.

=== Agora ===
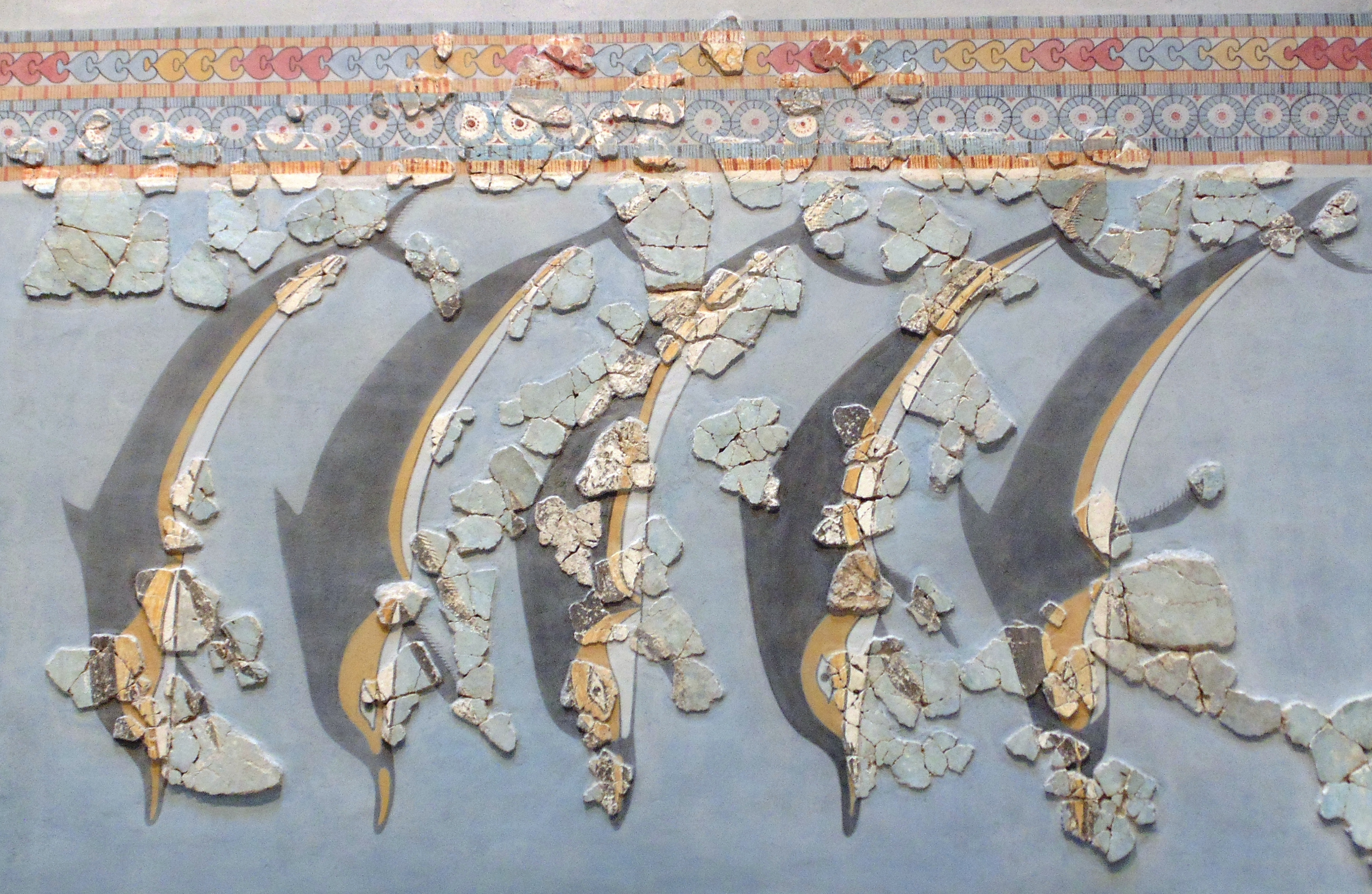
The famous frieze depicting the "Dolphins of Gla", found in the Gla Agora and currently on display in the Archaeological Museum of Thebes

Two further Mycenaean architectural complexes were found further south, in the area of the so-called "agora", which is separated from the "palace area" by a wall. The two complexes are parallel to each other (north-south orientation) and have similar plans. In each, a long corridor links buildings in the north and south of the complex. They are subdivided into small rooms. There is no scholarly consensus on their function. Suggestions include use as barracks, storage spaces/distribution centres, or workshops. The storage theory is supported by the discovery of large amounts of carbonised grain (probably burnt during the destruction of the site) in one of the buildings.

== Tiles ==
An interesting feature of the buildings at Gla is the discovery of fired pan and cover tiles, suggesting that some Mycenaean buildings already featured pitched, tiled roofs similar to those known from Classical antiquity.

There is some evidence that human occupation of Gla was not limited to the Mycenaean period. For example, the site yielded pottery from Neolithic and Byzantine times. It does not, however, appear to have been occupied during the Archaic-Classical Greek and Roman periods.

== Gallery ==
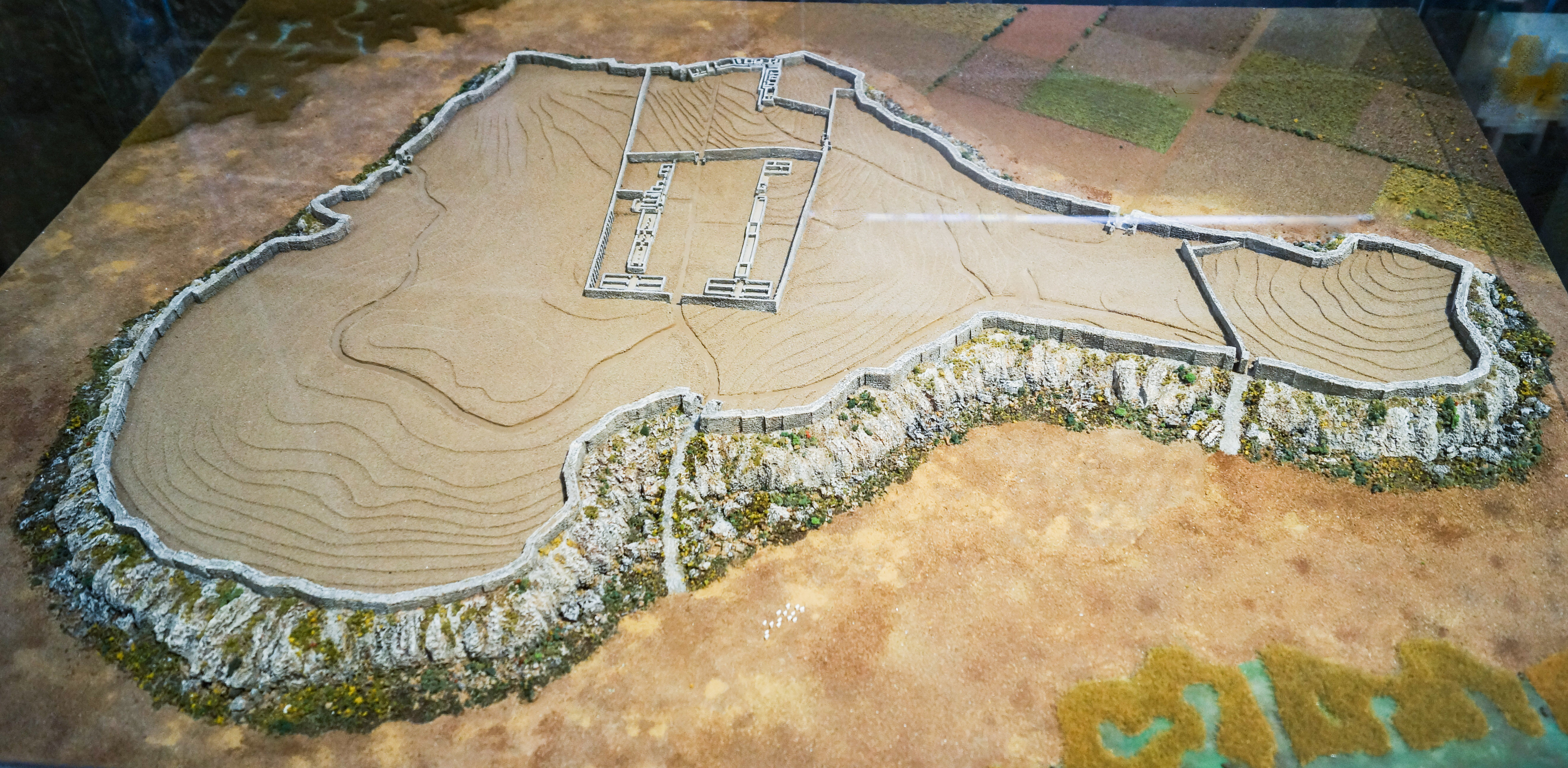
Model of archaeological site of Gla (Archaeological Museum of Thebes)

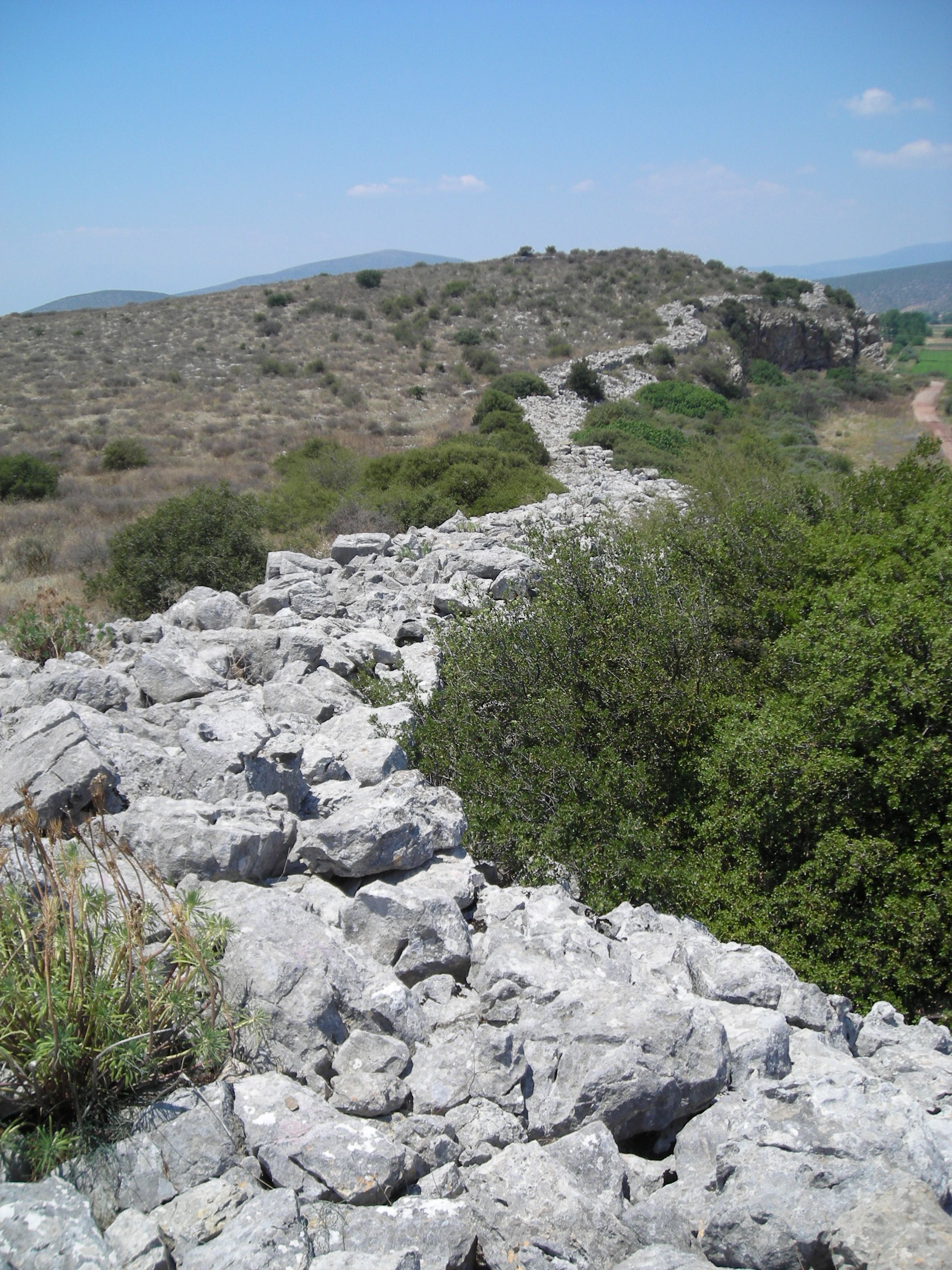
Looking toward the citadel proper from the northeast corner.

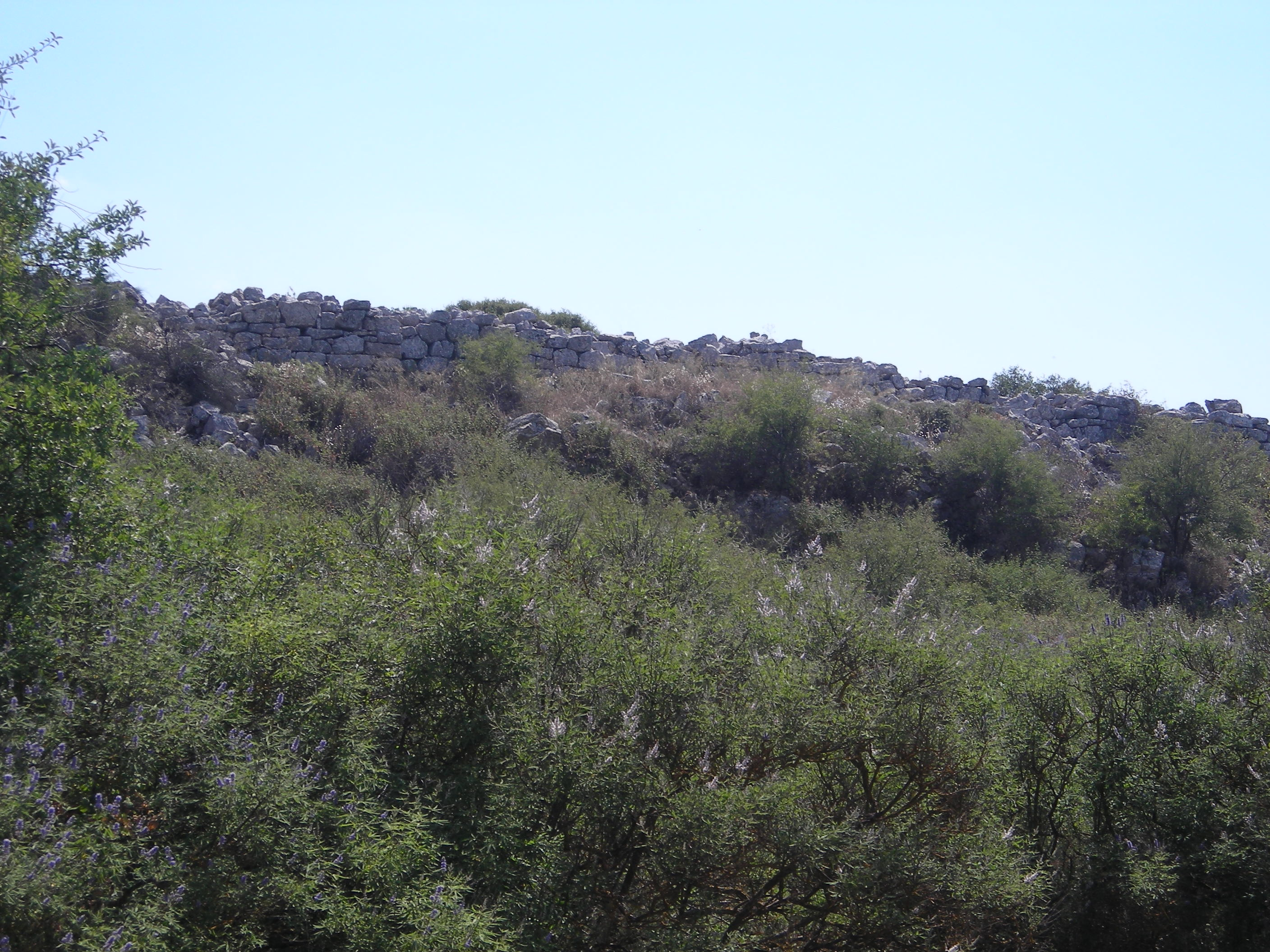
View of the northern wall of Gla from below the citadel

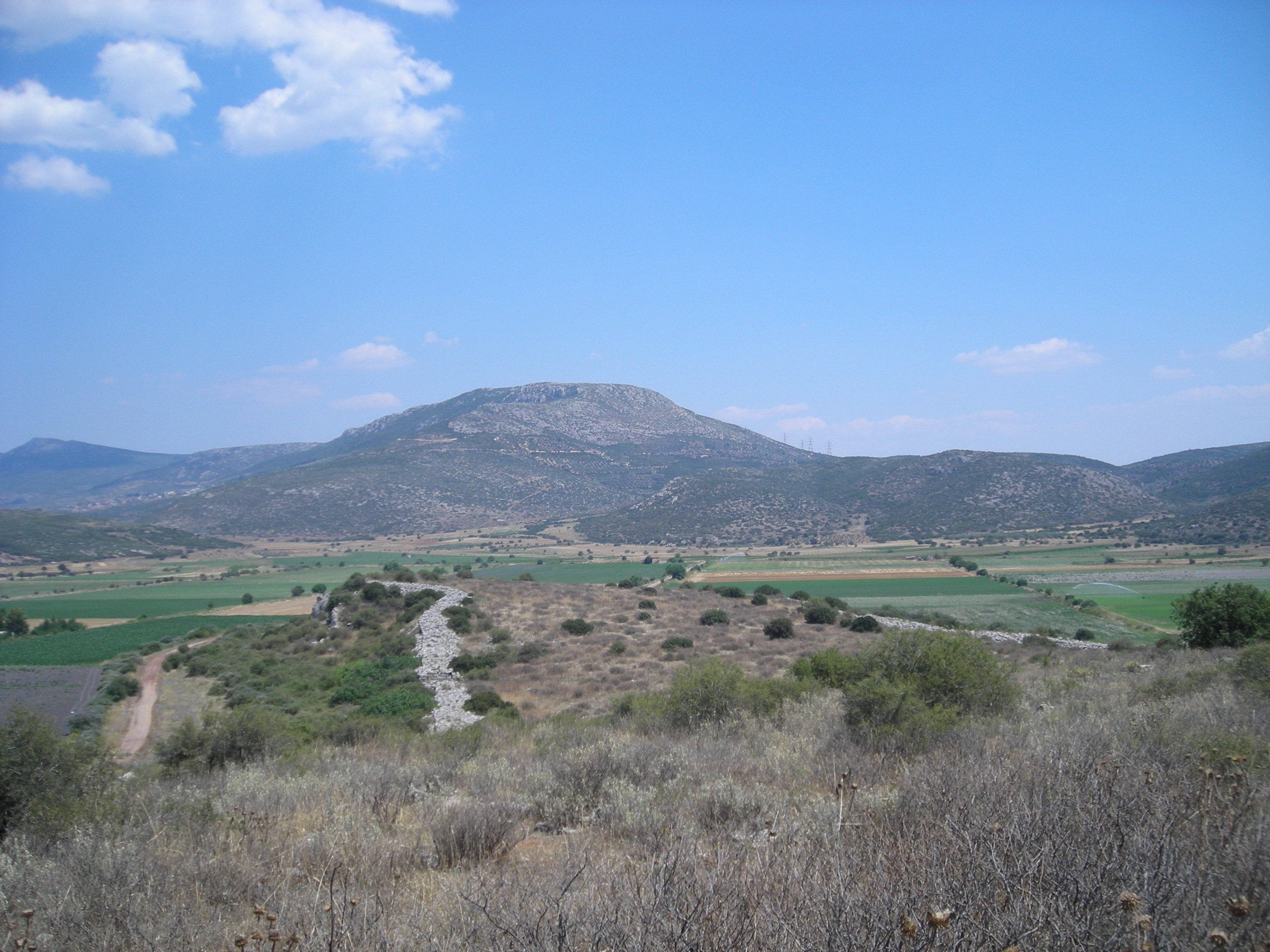
Standing in the citadel proper looking to the east with a view of the northern wall

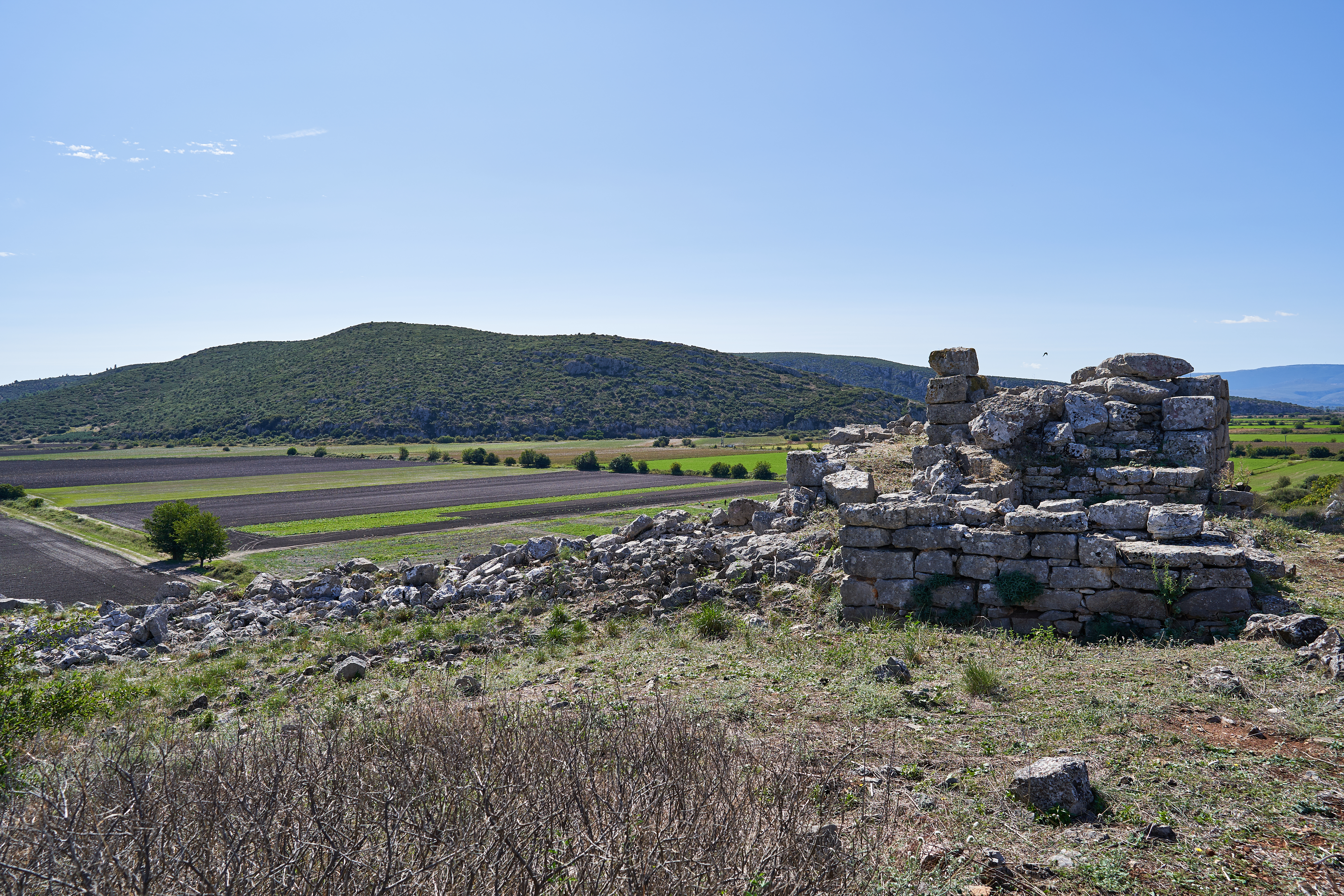
Sideview of one of the towers of the SE gate

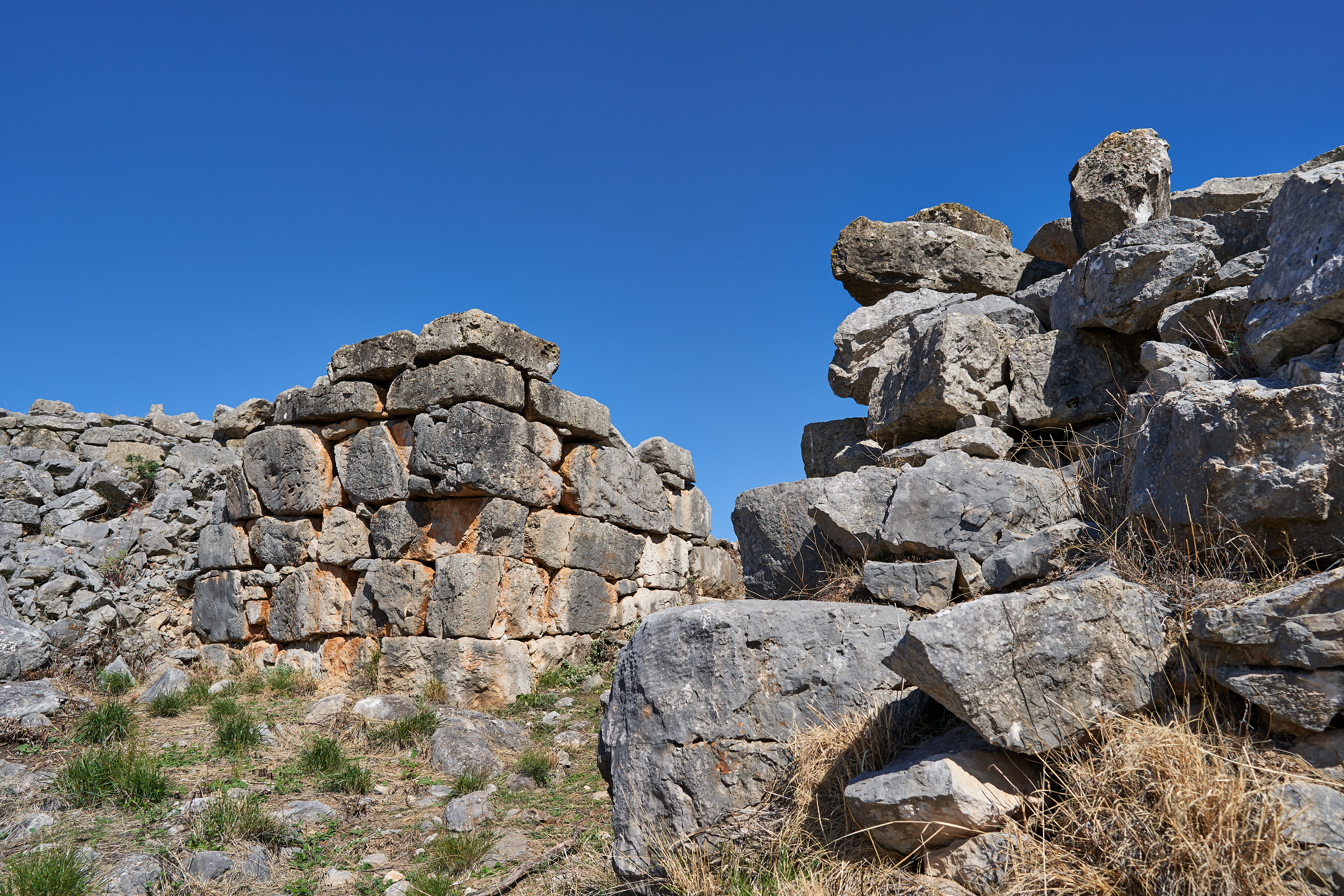
View of the gate from the outside
