= List of lakes of Greece =

This is a list of lakes of Greece.

== Natural lakes of Greece ==
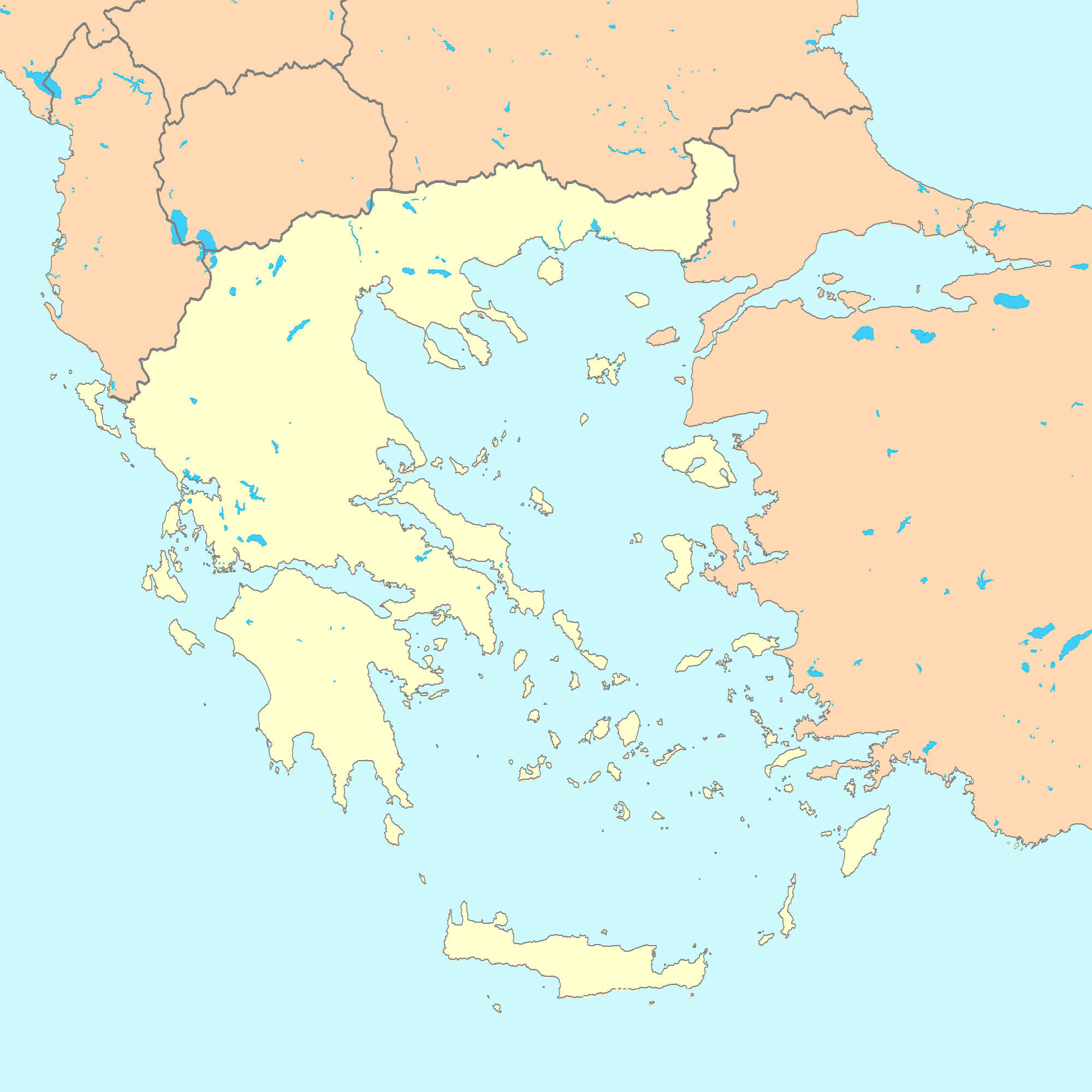
Natural and artificial lakes in Greece.

- Central Greece
  - Lake Amvrakia
  - Lake Dystos, Euboea, presently largely drained
  - Lake Lysimachia
  - Lake Ozeros
  - Lake Saltini
  - Lake Voulkaria
  - Lake Yliki
  - Lake Trichonida
  - Lake Vouliagmeni, Attica
- Crete
  - Lake Kournas
  - Lake Voulismeni
- Epirus
  - Lake Gistova
  - Lake Ioannina (Pamvotis)
  - Lake Morfi
- Macedonia
  - Lake Chimaditida
  - Lake Doirani, eastern portion
  - Lake Kastoria (Orestiada)
  - Lake Koronia
  - Lake Prespa, southeastern portion
  - Lake Mikri Prespa
  - Lake Vegoritida
  - Lake Volvi
  - Lake Zazari
- Thrace
  - Lake Mitrikou
  - Lake Vistonida
- Peloponnese
  - Lake Kaiafas
  - Lake Lamia, Achaia
  - Lake Stymfalia
  - Lake Vouliagmeni, Corinthia
  - Lake Taka

=== Former natural lakes ===
- Lake Copais, Boeotia
- Lake Karla (Voivis), near Volos

== Artificial lakes ==
- Central Greece
  - Evinos Lake
  - Kastraki Lake
  - Kremasta or Acheloos Lake
  - Marathon Lake
  - Mornos Lake
  - Stratos Lake
- Macedonia
  - Kerkini Lake
  - Polyfyto Lake
  - Agra Lake, Pella
  - Folia Lake, Kavala
- Peloponnese
  - Doxa Lake
  - Ladon Lake
  - Pineios Lake
  - Tsivlou Lake
- Thessaly
  - Plastiras Lake
- Crete
  - Zaros Lake
  - Agia Lake

=== Future artificial lakes ===
- Lake Karla (restored)
