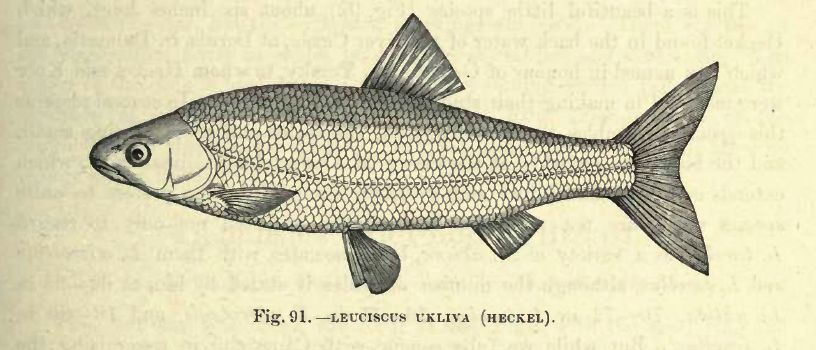

Conservation status
- Endangered (IUCN 3.1)

Scientific classification
- Kingdom: Animalia
- Phylum: Chordata
- Class: Actinopterygii
- Order: Cypriniformes
- Family: Leuciscidae
- Subfamily: Leuciscinae
- Genus: Telestes
- Species: T. ukliva

Binomial name
- Telestes ukliva (Heckel, 1843)

Synonyms
- Leuciscus ukliva (Heckel, 1843); Squalius ukliva Heckel, 1843

= Telestes ukliva =

Species of fish

Telestes ukliva, the Cetina dace or Ukliva dace, is a species of ray-finned fish belonging to the family Leuciscidae, whch includes the daces, Eurasian minnows and related species. Endemic to the Cetina river in Croatia and reported as extinct in the 1990s, it was rediscovered in 1997. Earlier authors misidentified T. ukliva as the alien Telestes muticellus and erroneously considered T. ukliva to be extinct. Its natural habitat is rivers. It is threatened by habitat loss.
