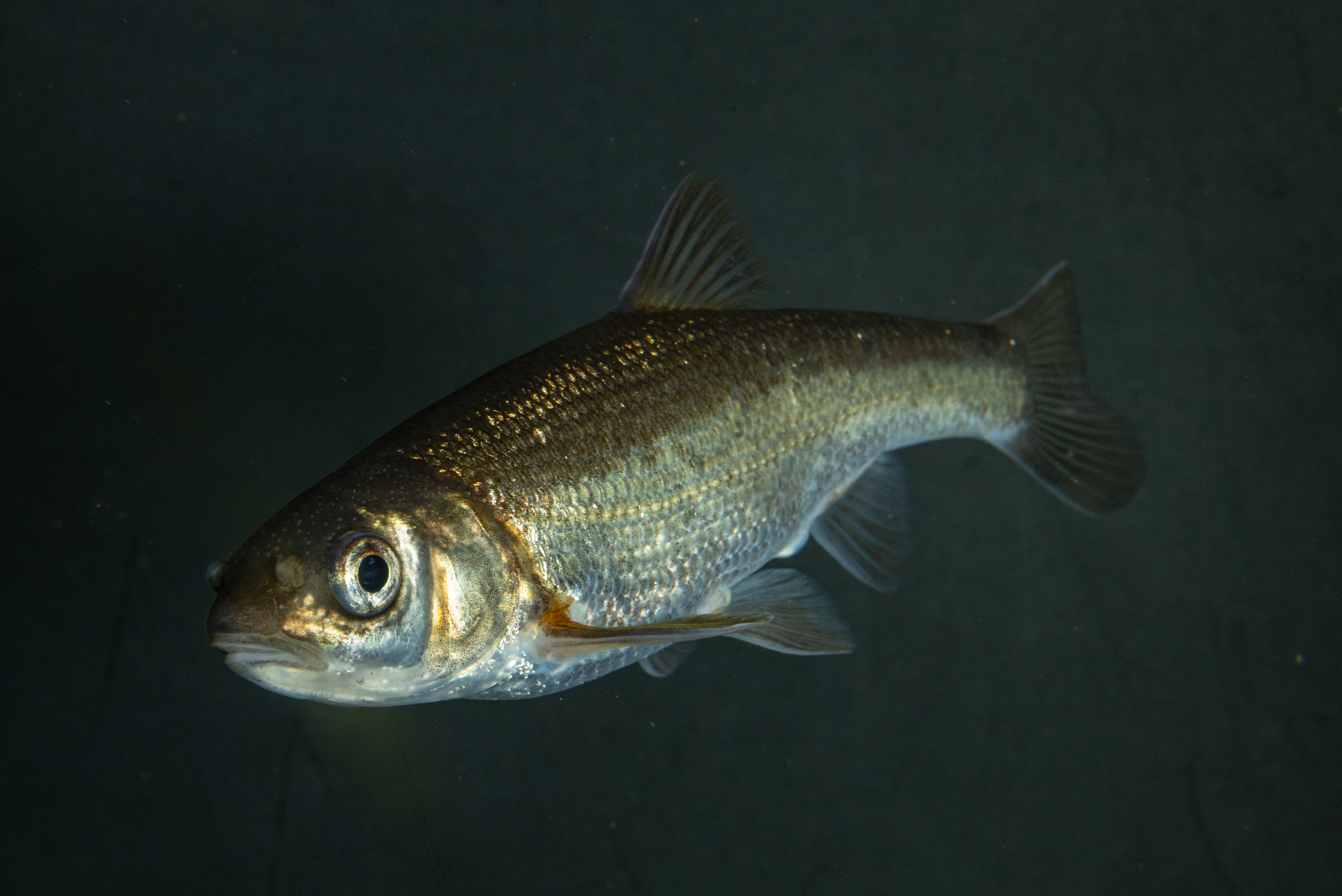

Conservation status
- Least Concern (IUCN 3.1)

Scientific classification
- Kingdom: Animalia
- Phylum: Chordata
- Class: Actinopterygii
- Order: Cypriniformes
- Family: Leuciscidae
- Subfamily: Leuciscinae
- Genus: Telestes
- Species: T. muticellus

Binomial name
- Telestes muticellus (Bonaparte, 1837)
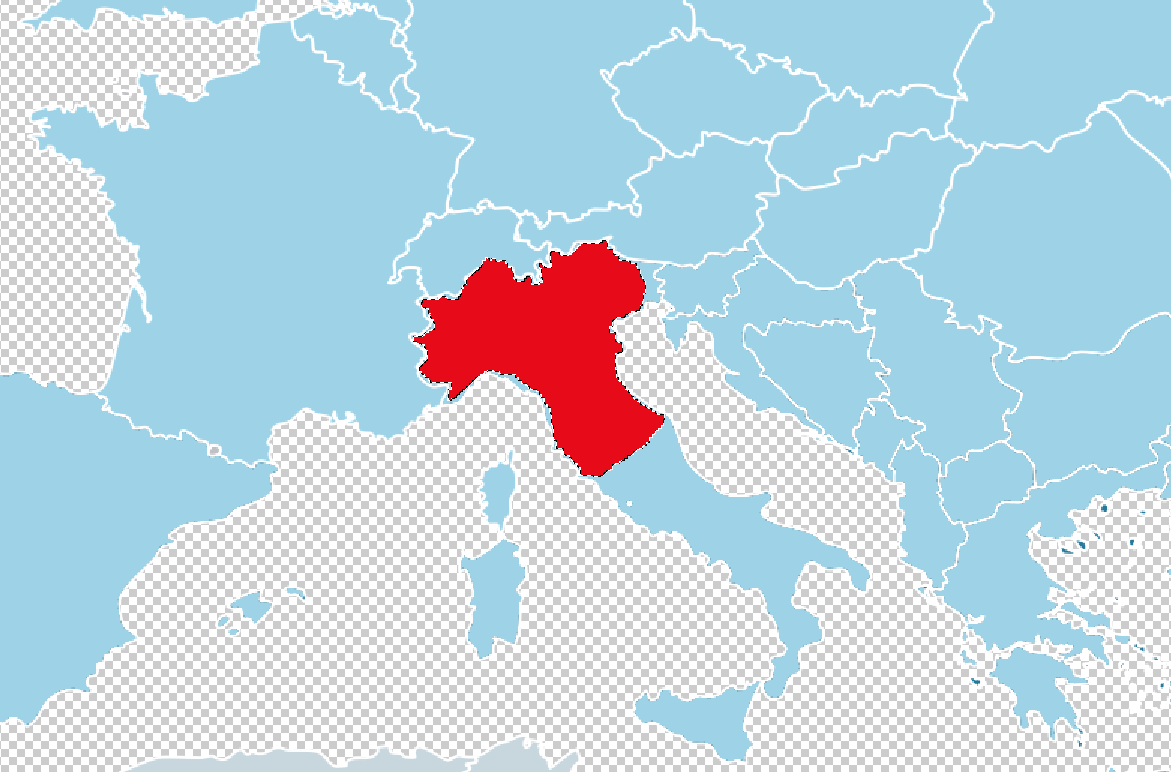

Synonyms
- Leuciscus multicellus Bonaparte, 1837

= Telestes muticellus =

Species of fish

Telestes muticellus, the Italian riffle dace, is a species of ray-finned fish belonging to the family Leuciscidae, which includes the daces, Eurasian minnows and related species. This species and the Western riffle dace or souffia (T. souffia) are both sometimes called vairone and were previously considered conspecific. This fish is found in northern Italy and Slovenia.

Its natural habitats are rivers and intermittent rivers. It is not considered threatened by the IUCN.
