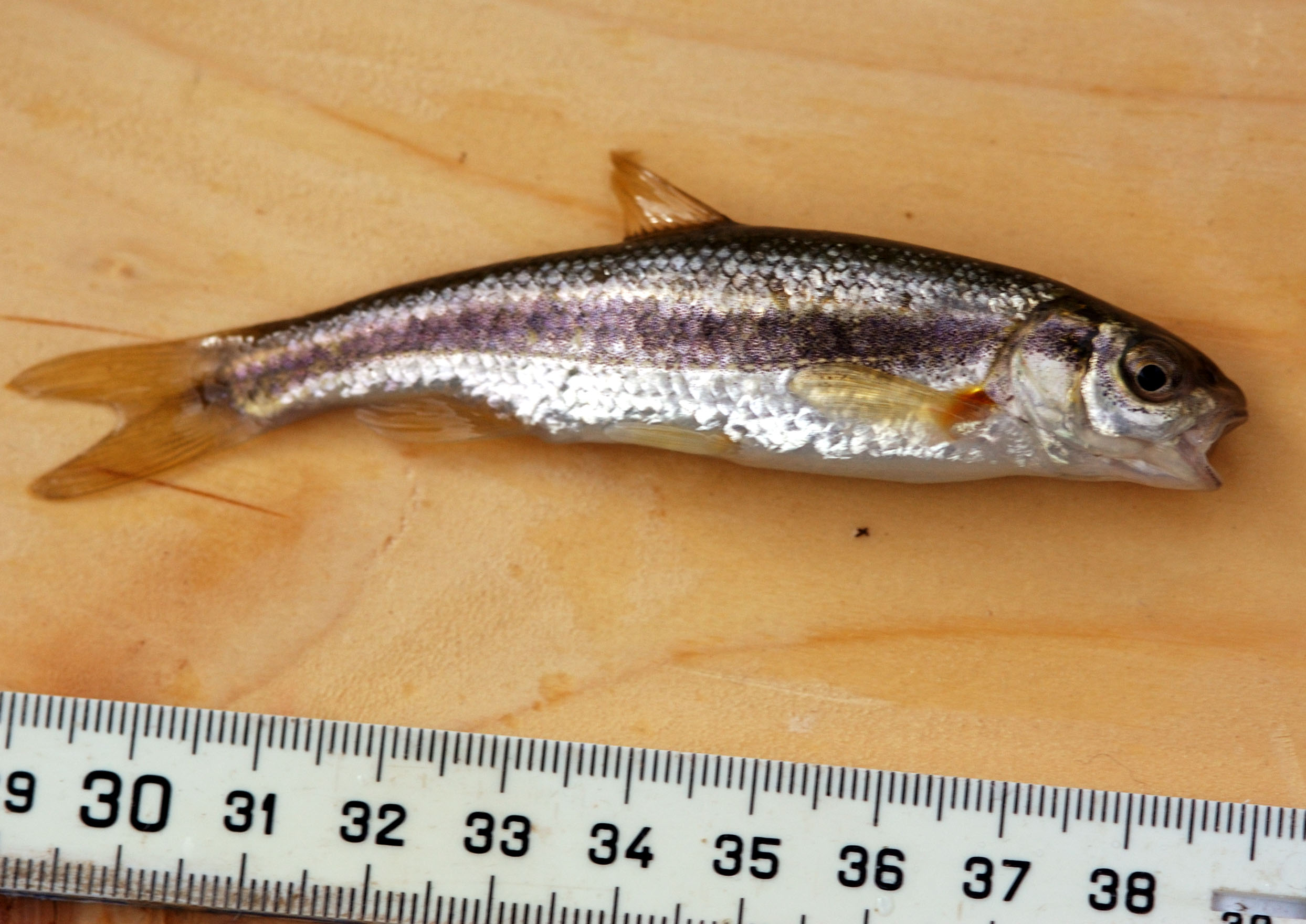
- Telestes muticellus

Scientific classification
- Kingdom: Animalia
- Phylum: Chordata
- Class: Actinopterygii
- Order: Cypriniformes
- Family: Leuciscidae
- Subfamily: Leuciscinae
- Genus: Telestes; Bonaparte, 1837

Type species
- Telestes muticellus (Bonaparte, 1837)

Species
- See text

= Telestes =

Genus of fishes

Telestes is a genus of freshwater ray-finned fishes belonging to the family Leuciscidae, which includes the daces, Eurasian minnows and related species. Many of the species in this genus were formerly usually included in Leuciscus.

== Species ==
These are the currently recognised species in this genus:

- Telestes alfiensis (Stephanidis, 1971)
- Telestes beoticus (Stephanidis, 1939) (Paskóviza)
- Telestes comes (Costa, 1838)
- Telestes croaticus (Steindachner, 1866) (Croatian pijor)
- Telestes dabar Bogutskaya, Zupančič, Bogut & Naseka, 2012 (Dabarsko dace)
- Telestes fontinalis (M. S. Karaman (sr), 1972) (Spring pijor)
- Telestes karsticus Marčić, Buj, Duplić, Ćaleta, Mustafić, Zanella, Zupančič & Mrakovčić, 2011 (Karst dace)
- Telestes metohiensis (Steindachner, 1901) (Striped dace)
- Telestes miloradi Bogutskaya, Zupančič, Bogut & Naseka, 2012 (Konavle dace)
- Telestes montenigrinus (Vuković, 1963) (Montenegro riffle dace)
- Telestes muticellus (Bonaparte, 1837) (Italian riffle dace)
- Telestes pleurobipunctatus (Stephanidis, 1939) (Epiros riffle dace)
- Telestes polylepis Steindachner, 1866 (Croatian dace)
- Telestes savigny Bonaparte, 1840
- Telestes souffia (A. Risso, 1827) (Western riffle dace)
- Telestes turskyi (Heckel, 1843) (Tursky's dace)
- Telestes ukliva (Heckel, 1843) (Cetina dace)
