= Telestes dabar =

Conservation status
- Endangered (IUCN 3.1)

Scientific classification
- Kingdom: Animalia
- Phylum: Chordata
- Class: Actinopterygii
- Order: Cypriniformes
- Family: Leuciscidae
- Subfamily: Leuciscinae
- Genus: Telestes
- Species: T. dabar

Binomial name
- Telestes dabar Bogutskaya, Zupančič, Bogut & Naseka, 2012

Species of fish

Telestes dabar, the Dabarsko dace, is a species of freshwater ray-finned fish belonging to the family Leuciscidae, which includes the daces, Eurasian minnows and related fishes. It is found in Vrijeka and Opacica rivers of eastern Herzegovina.
