= Lake Yliki =

Lake in Boeotia, Greece

Lake Yliki Υλίκη
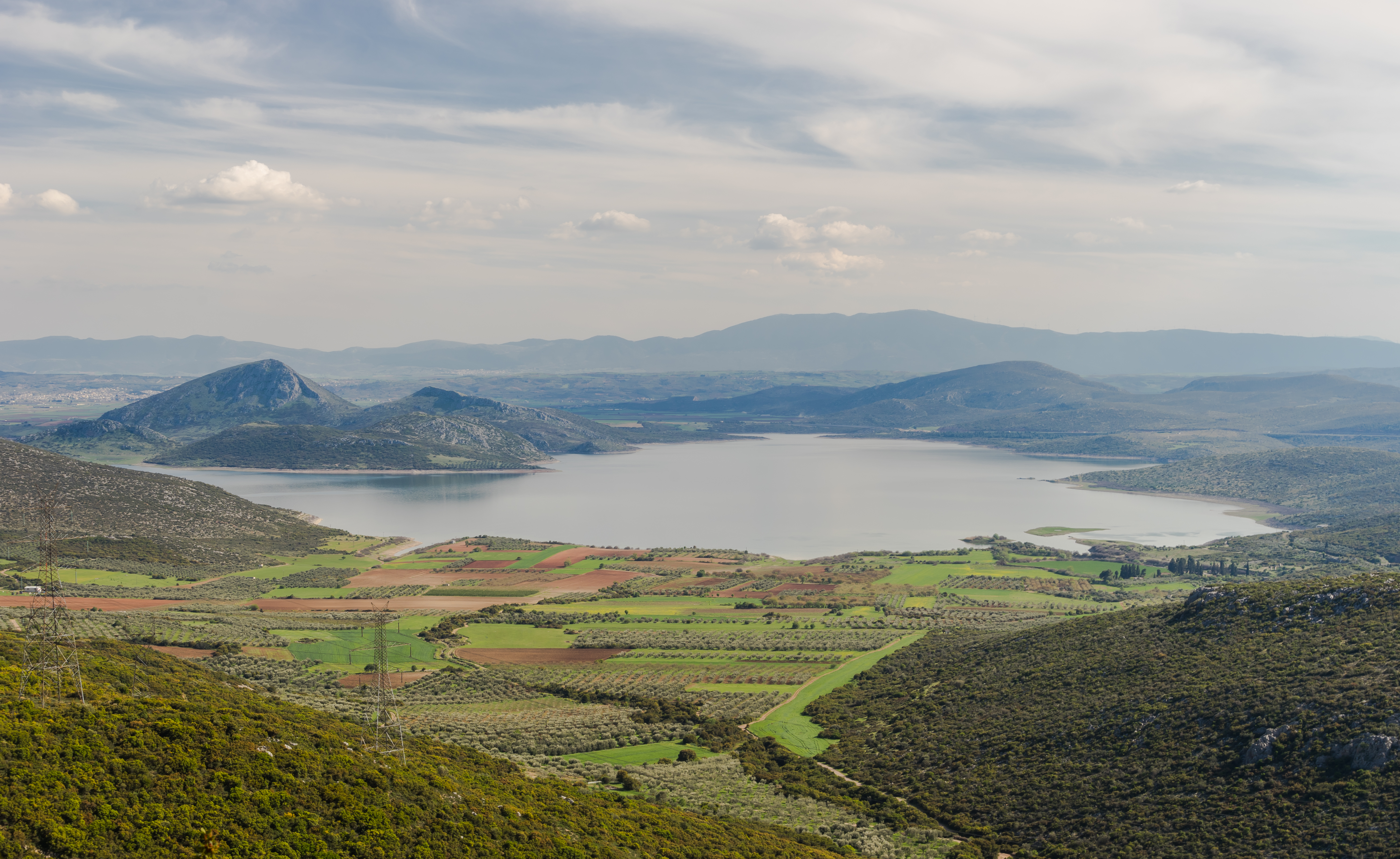
- partial view of Lake Yliki, north of Thebes, Greece.

- Location within Greece
- Location: Central Greece
- Coordinates: 38°24′N 23°16′E
- Primary inflows: Cephissus
- Basin countries: Greece
- Surface area: 19.1 km^{2} (7.4 sq mi)
- Surface elevation: 78 m (256 ft)
- Islands: 10

Lake Yliki (Greek: Υλίκη Yliki, Ancient Greek: Ὑλίκη Hylike, Latinised as Hylica) is a large natural lake of Boeotia, central Greece. Situated 8 km north of Thebes at 78 m elevation, it has been an important source of drinking water for the Athens agglomeration since 1958. It is surrounded by low mountains, which separate it from the drained Lake Copais.

== Wildlife ==
The lake is home to several threatened endemic or near-endemic fish species: (IUCN Red List status shown)

- Yliki barbel or skarouni (Barbus carottae) formerly classified as (Luciobarbus graecus)
- Greek stickleback or ellinopygósteos (Pungitius hellenicus)
- marathon minnow (Pelasgus marathonicus)
- Beotian riffle dace or paskóviza (Telestes beoticus)
- Greek rudd or kalamithra (Scardinius graecus)
- Yliki roach (Leucos ylikiensis)

== In popular culture ==
Some scenes of French-singer Indila's music video "S.O.S" were filmed at the lake.

== See also ==
- List of lakes in Greece
