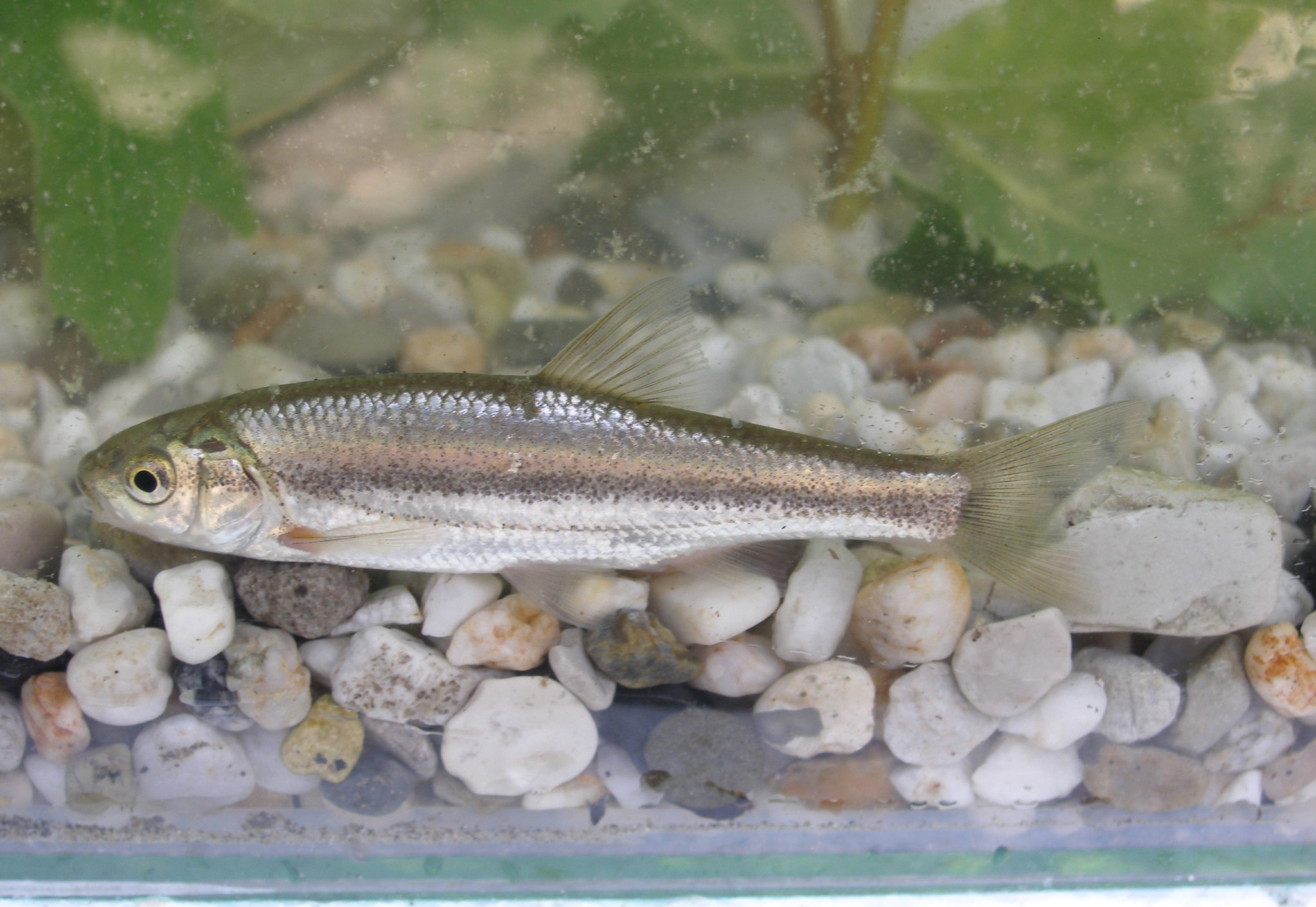

Conservation status
- Least Concern (IUCN 3.1)

Scientific classification
- Kingdom: Animalia
- Phylum: Chordata
- Class: Actinopterygii
- Order: Cypriniformes
- Family: Leuciscidae
- Subfamily: Leuciscinae
- Genus: Telestes
- Species: T. pleurobipunctatus

Binomial name
- Telestes pleurobipunctatus (Stephanidis, 1939)

Synonyms
- Rutilus pleuribipunctatus Stephanidis, 1939; Leuciscus pleurobipunctatus (Stephanidis 1939); Phoxinellus pleurobipunctatus (Stephanidis 1939)

= Telestes pleurobipunctatus =

Species of fish

Telestes pleurobipunctatus is a species of ray-finned fish belonging to the family Leuciscidae, which includes the daces, Eurasian minnows and related species. It is endemic to Greece. Its natural habitats are rivers and intermittent rivers. It is threatened by habitat loss.
