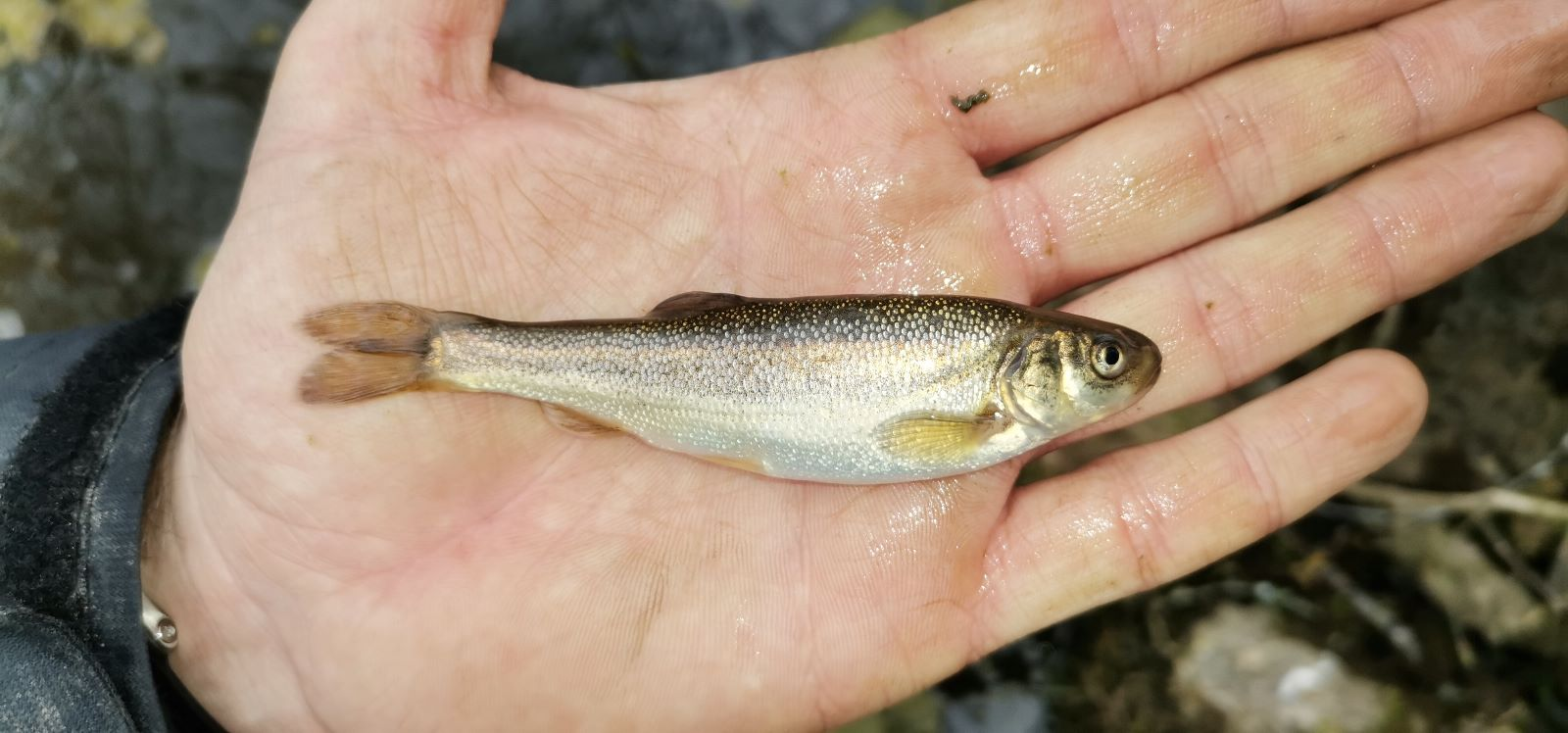

Conservation status
- Critically Endangered (IUCN 3.1)

Scientific classification
- Kingdom: Animalia
- Phylum: Chordata
- Class: Actinopterygii
- Order: Cypriniformes
- Family: Leuciscidae
- Subfamily: Leuciscinae
- Genus: Telestes
- Species: T. fontinalis

Binomial name
- Telestes fontinalis (M. S. Karaman (sr), 1972)

Synonyms
- Phoxinellus adspersus fontinalis M. S. Karaman, 1972

= Telestes fontinalis =

Species of fish

Telestes fontinalis, the Spring pijor or Krbava dace, is a species of freshwater ray-finned fish belonging to the family Leuciscidae, which includes the daces, Eurasian minnows and related fishes. It is found only in Croatia. Its natural habitats are intermittent rivers and inland karsts. It is threatened by habitat loss.

== Sources ==
- Froese, Rainer; Pauly, Daniel (eds.). "Telestes fontinalis". FishBase. August 2011 version.
