= Telestes croaticus =

Conservation status
- Endangered (IUCN 3.1)

Scientific classification
- Kingdom: Animalia
- Phylum: Chordata
- Class: Actinopterygii
- Order: Cypriniformes
- Family: Leuciscidae
- Subfamily: Leuciscinae
- Genus: Telestes
- Species: T. croaticus

Binomial name
- Telestes croaticus Steindachner, 1866

Synonyms
- Phoxinellus croaticus Steindachner, 1866; Paraphoxinus croaticus (Steindachner, 1866)

Species of fish

Telestes croaticus, the Croatian Pijor, is a species of freshwater ray-finned fish belonging to the family Leuciscidae, which includes the daces, Eurasian minnows and related fishes. It is found only in Croatia. Its natural habitats are rivers and inland karsts. It is threatened by habitat loss.
