= Telestes miloradi =

Conservation status
- Critically Endangered (IUCN 3.1)

Scientific classification
- Kingdom: Animalia
- Phylum: Chordata
- Class: Actinopterygii
- Order: Cypriniformes
- Family: Leuciscidae
- Subfamily: Leuciscinae
- Genus: Telestes
- Species: T. miloradi

Binomial name
- Telestes miloradi Bogutskaya, Zupančič, Bogut & Naseka, 2012

Species of fish

Telestes miloradi, the Konavle dace, is a species of freshwater ray-finned fish belonging to the family Leuciscidae, which includes the daces, Eurasian minnows and related species. It is endemic the Ljuta River in Croatia.
