= Telestes karsticus =

Conservation status
- Endangered (IUCN 3.1)

Scientific classification
- Kingdom: Animalia
- Phylum: Chordata
- Class: Actinopterygii
- Order: Cypriniformes
- Family: Leuciscidae
- Subfamily: Leuciscinae
- Genus: Telestes
- Species: T. karsticus

Binomial name
- Telestes karsticus Marčić, Buj, Duplić, Ćaleta, Mustafić, Zanella, Zupančič & Mrakovčić, 2011

Species of fish

Telestes karsticus, the Karst dace, is a species of freshwater ray-finned fish belonging to the family Leuciscidae, which includes the daces, Eurasian minnows and related species. It is endemic to Croatia. Its natural habitats are freshwater springs, subterranean rivers and small sinkhole ponds.

Some populations spend many months underground, though it does not show any troglomorphism. It is the only known fish to spawn underground in the Dinaric karst.

It is threatened by introduced species as well as water abstraction.
