= Telestes montenigrinus =

Conservation status
- Near Threatened (IUCN 3.1)

Scientific classification
- Kingdom: Animalia
- Phylum: Chordata
- Class: Actinopterygii
- Order: Cypriniformes
- Family: Leuciscidae
- Subfamily: Leuciscinae
- Genus: Telestes
- Species: T. montenigrinus

Binomial name
- Telestes montenigrinus (Vuković, 1963)

Synonyms
- Leuciscus souffia montenigrinus Vukovic, 1963; Leuciscus montenigrinus Vuković, 1963

Species of fish

Telestes montenigrinus, the Montenegro riffle dace, is a species of freshwater ray-finned fish belonging to the family Leuciscidae, which includes the daces, Eurasian minnows and related species. It is found in Albania and Serbia and Montenegro.

Its natural habitats are rivers and intermittent freshwater lakes. It is considered Near Threatened by the IUCN.
