= Lake Dystos =

Lake in Greece

Lake Dystos Λίμνη Δύστος
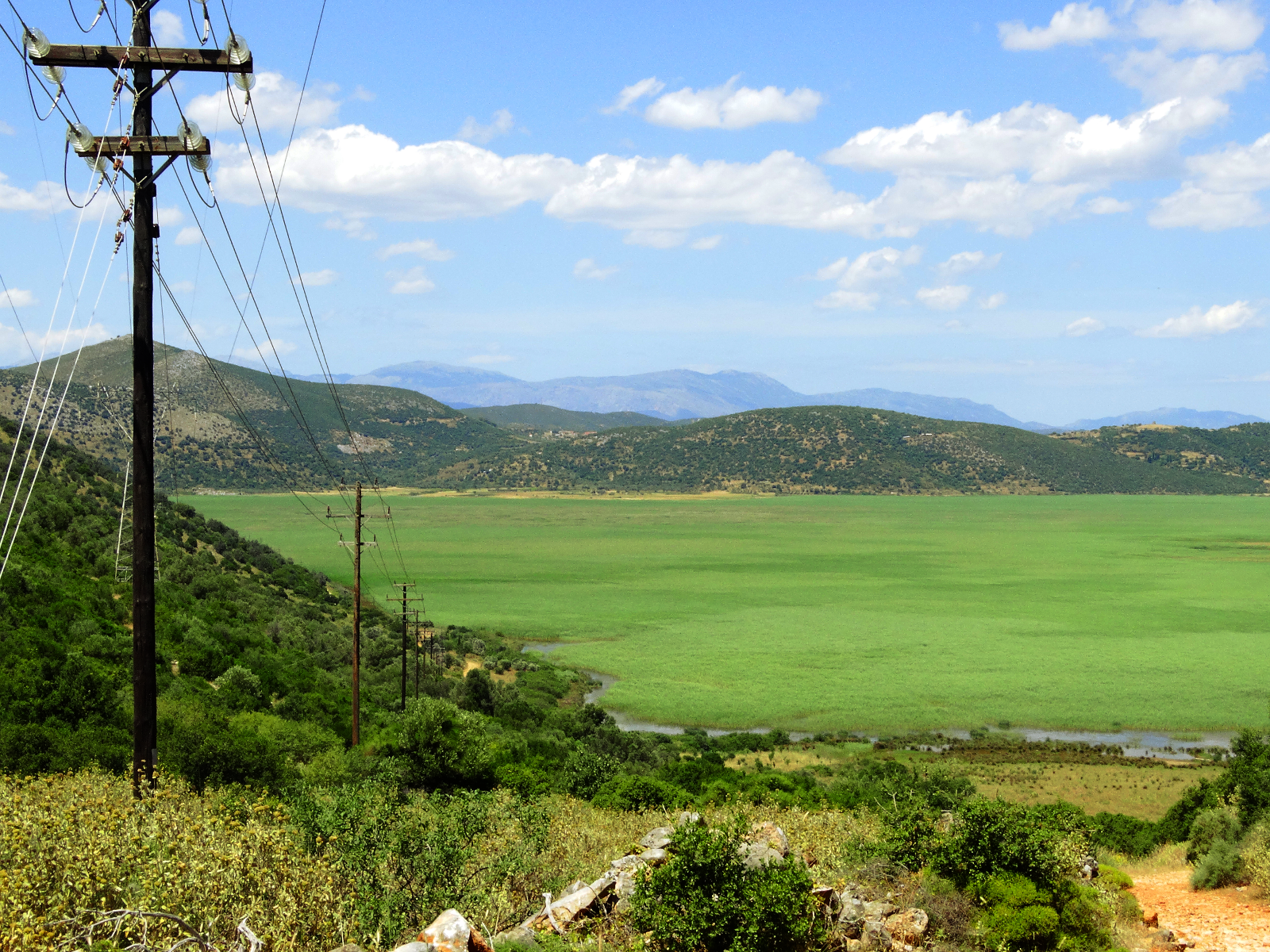
- Overview of lake Dystos

- Location within Greece
- Location: Euboea, Greece
- Coordinates: 38°20′25″N 24°06′58″E
- Catchment area: 18 km^{2} (6.9 sq mi)
- Surface area: 4.75 km^{2} (1.83 sq mi)
- Max. depth: 4 m (13 ft)
- Surface elevation: 16 m (52 ft)

Lake Dystos (Greek: Λίμνη Δύστος is a natural lake located on the central part of the island of Euboea, southeast of the Aliveri. It covers an area of approximately 4.75 km^{2} (1.83 sq mi) and its maximum depth does not exceed 4 m (13 ft). People have populated the shores of the lake since the Neolithic period. The homonymous town that is located nearby, thrived in the Classical and Hellenistic periods.

== See also ==
- List of lakes in Greece
