= Telestes polylepis =

Conservation status
- Critically Endangered (IUCN 3.1)

Scientific classification
- Kingdom: Animalia
- Phylum: Chordata
- Class: Actinopterygii
- Division: Teleostei
- Order: Cypriniformes
- Family: Leuciscidae
- Subfamily: Leuciscinae
- Genus: Telestes
- Species: T. polylepis

Binomial name
- Telestes polylepis Steindachner, 1866

Synonyms
- Leuciscus polylepis (Steindachner, 1866)

Species of fish

Telestes polylepis, the Croatian dace, is a species of ray-finned fish belonging to the family Leuciscidae, which includes the daces, Eurasian minnows and related species. It is found only in a 4 km^{2} (1.5 sq mi) area of karst landscape in Ogulinsko polje, northwestern Croatia.

Its natural habitats are freshwater springs, subterranean rivers and small ponds.

It is threatened by introduced species as well as habitat loss. In 2024, they were considered critically endangered with about 100 remaining.

Males tend to develop pronounced nuptial tubercles on the body and head.
