= Lydian barbel =

Conservation status
- Least Concern (IUCN 3.1)

Scientific classification
- Kingdom: Animalia
- Phylum: Chordata
- Class: Actinopterygii
- Order: Cypriniformes
- Family: Cyprinidae
- Subfamily: Barbinae
- Genus: Luciobarbus
- Species: L. lydianus

Binomial name
- Luciobarbus lydianus (Boulenger, 1896)

Species of fish

The Lydian barbel (Luciobarbus lydianus) is a species of ray-finned fish in the genus Luciobarbus from the Gediz River and Asagiçavuslu Stream in Turkey.
