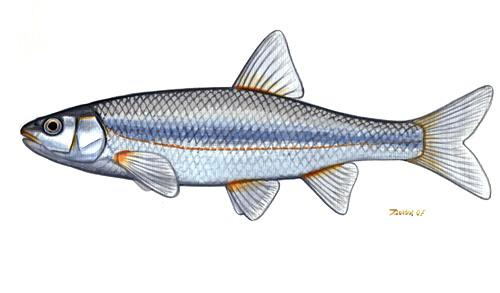

Conservation status
- Least Concern (IUCN 3.1)

Scientific classification
- Kingdom: Animalia
- Phylum: Chordata
- Class: Actinopterygii
- Order: Cypriniformes
- Family: Leuciscidae
- Subfamily: Leuciscinae
- Genus: Telestes
- Species: T. souffia

Binomial name
- Telestes souffia (A. Risso, 1827)

Synonyms
- Leuciscus souffia Risso, 1827; Chondrostoma rysela Agassiz, 1835; Leuciscus agassii Valenciennes, 1844; Telestes rysela Heckel, 1851

= Souffia =

Species of fish

The souffia, Western riffle dace, telestes, vairone or western vairone (Telestes souffia) is a species of freshwater ray-finned fish belonging to the family Leuciscidae, which includes the daces, Eurasian minnows and related fishes. This species is found in rivers that drain into the Mediterranean, as well as the Rhine and Danube catchments.

== Taxonomy ==
The souffia was first formally described as Leuciscus souffia in 1827 by the French naturalist Antoine Risso with its type locality given as the River Var in France. This taxon is now regarded as a valid species in the genus Telestes in the subfamily Leuciscinae of the family Leuciscidae.

== Etymology ==
The souffia belongs to the genus Telestes, a name which was coined by Charles Lucien Bonaparte who did not explain its etymology, although it may be from teléstēs, the Greek for "completer" or "finisher", and if that is thecase then the allusion is not obvious. in 1877 David Starr Jordan suggested that the name been derived téleios which means "spotless", i.e. without blemish but nothing in Bonaparte's description supports this. Telesetes is also a name, with a murdered 8th century B. C. E. king of Corinth and a 5th century C. E. Greek poet bearing the name. The specific name souffia is the French vernacular name for this fish.

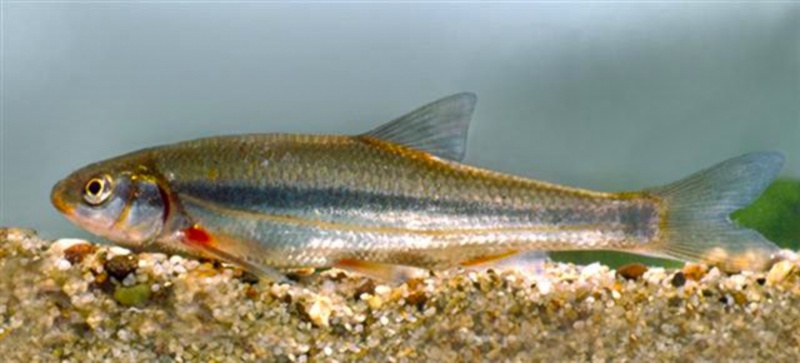

== Distribution and habitat ==
The souffia is found in Europe where it occurs in rivers draining into the Gulf of Lion, the Hérault, including the Rhône, to the VAr River draining into the Ligurian Sea. It the occurs in the Soča river in northeastern Italy and western Slovenia which drains into the Adriatic Sea. It is also found in the catchments of the upper Rhine and the Danube from Switzerland and Germany east to the Tisza drainage in Romania and Ukraine. This is a gregarious species of cool, flowing, well-oxygenated rivers and streams, avoiding the lowland stretches.
