= Barbus carottae =

Conservation status
- Endangered (IUCN 3.1)

Scientific classification
- Kingdom: Animalia
- Phylum: Chordata
- Class: Actinopterygii
- Order: Cypriniformes
- Family: Cyprinidae
- Subfamily: Barbinae
- Genus: Barbus
- Species: B. carottae

Binomial name
- Barbus carottae (Bianco, 1998)

Synonyms
- Messinobarbus carottae Bianco, 1998; Luciobarbus carottae (Bianco, 1998); Luciobarbus graecus (Steindachner 1895) p. p.

Species of fish

Barbus carottae is a species of ray-finned fish in the genus Barbus from Lake Yliki in Greece.

== Etymology ==
Named for Arianna Carotta who collected the specimens used for the species description, along with the author.

== Description ==
Generally very similar to other lake populations of barbels. Body colour uniformly silver in adults and speckled by brownish, irregular spots in juveniles. Dorsal fin, 7-8 soft rays, spiny and serrated last unbranched dorsal-fin ray. Median lobe of the posterior lip moderately compressed. The distinguishing feature is the large scales. The SL of the holotype was 105 mm (4.1 in) and when compared to similar sized syntypes, the number of scales along the lateral line was reduced to 39-43, from 50-57. There were also fewer rows of scales above and below the lateral line (8-10 above, 6-8 below).
