= Lake Paralimni =

- Lake Ougria
- Λίμνη Παραλίμνη (Greek)
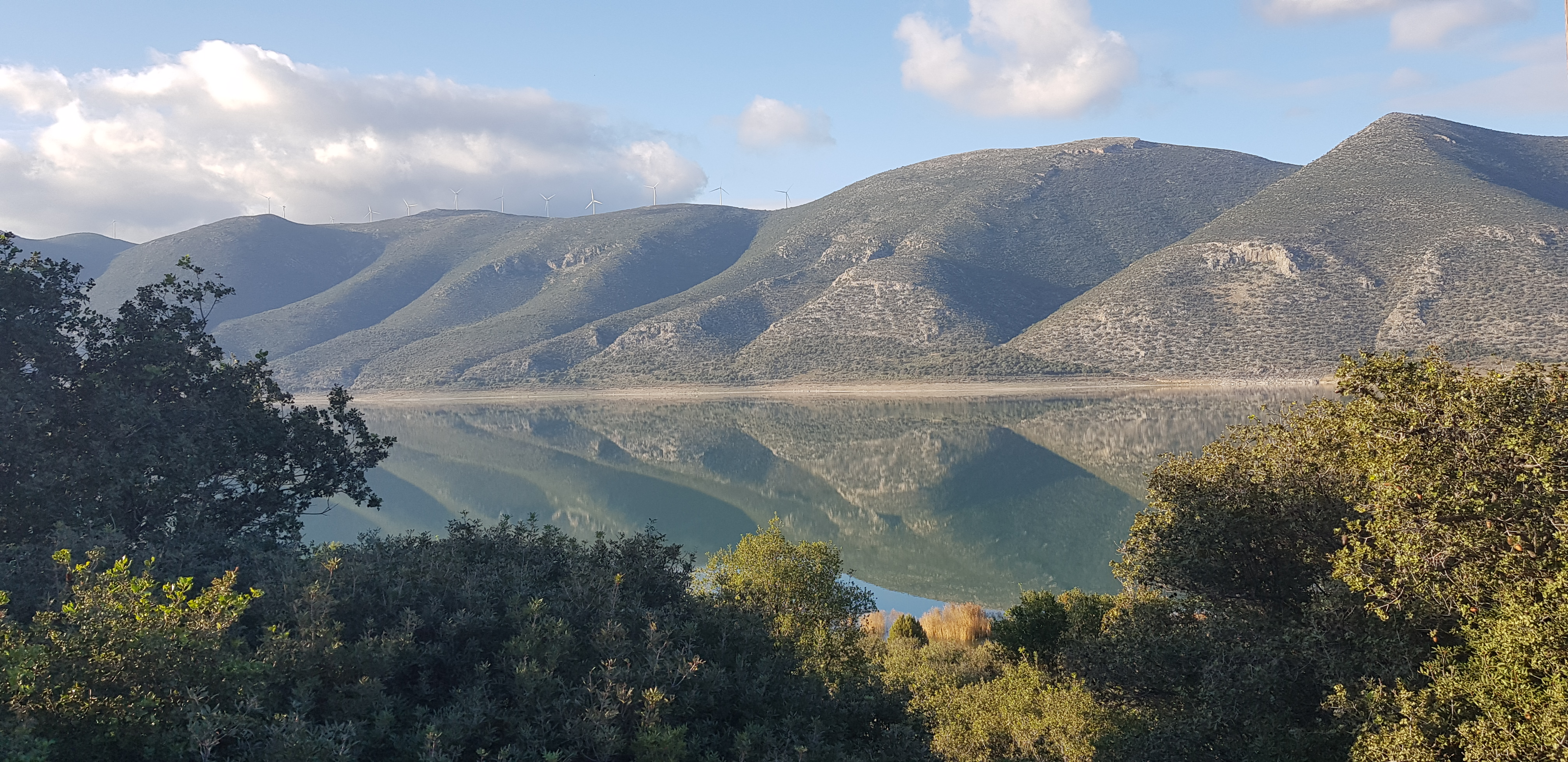
- View of the lake

- Location of Lake Paralimni
- Location: Central Greece
- Coordinates: 38°27′45″N 23°21′36″E
- Type: reservoir
- Primary inflows: Lake Yliki through katabothra
- Primary outflows: Gulf of Eubeoa through a katabothron, Athens through the Athens aqueduct
- Max. length: 10 kilometres (6.2 mi)
- Surface area: 14.5 square kilometres (5.6 sq mi)
- Max. depth: 20.5 metres (67 ft)
- Surface elevation: 55 metres (180 ft)

Lake Paralimni (Greek: Λίμνη Παραλίμνη, Limne Paralimni, Latinised as Lacus Paralimnus), formerly named Lake Ougria, Latinized to Uggria, is the easternmost of an east-west sequence of three ancient lakes in Central Greece that divided the mountains of Phocis from the plains of southern Boeotia on the east and the northern plains of Boeotia from the southern on the west. The westernmost and largest of the lakes, Lake Copais, was drained in the 19th century to make way for a large tract of fertile agricultural land, divided into plots. The ancient Bronze-age community on its northwestern shore, Orchomenos, is now a modern city at the edge of the farmland. The Cephissos River descending from Phocis to enter Copais has been rerouted through it to enter Lake Yliki from the north. Lake Yliki and Lake Paralimni are part of the water supply of the city of Athens, which houses one-third of the population of Greece.

== Hydrology of the three lakes ==
The three lakes were never connected by surface channels. They each settled into their own distinct beds. Significant bridges of hilly terrain separate them, and divide Paralimni from the Gulf of Euboea. The lakes are unusual in that they were all connected by underground streams called katabothra. These caves, beginning as sinkholes, are a feature of karst, or limestone topography. Limestone erodes easily. Examples of former katabothra can be visited in Copais. Most are on the eastern side. Many are associated with prehistoric settlements.

The limestone beds of which the mountains of Greece are mainly composed were deposited at the bottom of Neotethys Sea. As Africa drifted into Eurasia and was subducted under it the Hellenic orogeny on the elevated edge of Eurasia wrinkled the limestone beds into the mountains of Greece. This extended event happened in the Cenozoic Era, 66 mya to present. Like the Alps, the mountains are still rising.

The Karst topography and caves must have eroded after the mountains appeared. They were basically unaffected by the glaciers of the Pleistocene, or Ice Age, and must have preceded them. So far the only evidence of glaciers in Greece are the cirque features of the Pindus Mountains, of which Parnassus, a purely limestine peak, is an offshoot. Parnassus does have a cave glacier, but that may have developed by ordinary wintering. There is no sign of any glacial scouring in the valley of the Cephissus or the lake valley. Moreover, if there had been any extensive, repeated flooding, the three land bridges would have eroded away, and the Cephissus would be left at the bottom of a river valley emptying into the Gulf of Euboea. Moreover, there is not and never has been any extensive flow through the sinkholes or the lakes could not have been impounded.

Copais originally was less of a lake than a wetland. It stored melt water coming down the Cephissus from the mountains of Central Greece in the spring. This water gradually drained away through the katabothra. The water levels in each lake rose and fell synchronously due to the underground connections.

Drainig Copais altered the hydrology. The large amount of flood waters formerly stored by Copais could no longer collect there but must be passed on to Yliki and Paralimni. The elevation of the surface of Yliki having been at 45 metres (148 ft) now rose to 70 metres (230 ft), average figures, with a concomitant increase of surface area from 13 square kilometres (5.0 sq mi) to 22 square kilometres (8.5 sq mi). The surface of Paralimni rose from 35 metres (115 ft) to 55 metres (180 ft) with an increase in surface area from 9 square kilometres (3.5 sq mi) to 14.5 square kilometres (5.6 sq mi) more or less. The east-west length of the lake expanded from 8 kilometres (5.0 mi) to 10 kilometres (6.2 mi), and the width by 2 kilometres (1.2 mi).

The rise in Lake Yliki at first appeared to be a threat to the geological stability of the region. A 3 kilometres (1.9 mi) canal was planned between Lake Yliki and Paralimni, the Mouriki Channel, and was excavated down to an elevation of 78 metres (256 ft). The realization that even in flood the lake level would never rise to that elevation stopped work on the channel, which is visible as a controlled waterway on the Yliki side but in fact dries out further on and does not go through to Paralimni. During construction on Yliki the main katabothron between the two lakes was blocked. The water levels are now independent. The difference between the two levels is about 33 metres (108 ft).

Paralimni was left hanging independently over the Gulf of Euboea. The separating land bridge is 2 kilometres (1.2 mi) across, elevation 87 metres (285 ft). One artificial tunnel replaces the former katabothron, now blocked, connecting Paralimni with the Gulf. It is high up and serves to drain the lake when the water level becomes high. The connection of both lakes to the Athens aqueduct solved all the hydrologic problems. All the extra water is siphoned into the drinking water of Athens. Cephissus no longer enters the open sea.

== Geography of Paralimni ==
=== Topography ===
Any consideration of the topographic features of the three lakes must take into consideration the draining of Copais and concomitant expansion in depth and area of Yliki and Paralimni. The latter not only erased tracks and roads, and made the land non-arable and unbuildable, but rendered any possible archaeological evidence inaccessible, at least temporarily. It is therefore appropriate to speak of pre-expansion and post-expansion topography, which the scholarly tracts do.

Paralimni, a 10 kilometres (6.2 mi) lake in the NE to SW direction, is locked by mountains for most of its length. Ptoion, a mountain range on its north shore, which separates it from the Gulf of Euboea, descends to the water's edge in slopes and cliffs, especially since the expansion of surface area. If there was once an ancient track, it must have been many feet lower. In a similar case, although not quite as severe, are the foothills of Messapio, which come down to a somewhat lesser length on the south side. Today there is not even a mule track, but then, there is no point in one. The main highway to the south leads from the plain of Thebes to the coast through a pass in Messapio.

=== Demography ===
The east end, a flat and fertile area, is approachable from Anthidona, also called Mandraki from its harbor, which is on the Gulf of Euboea. Archaeological evidence there pushes the earliest date of the site back to the Neolithic; that is, to a pre-Greek era. It includes the walled Homeric city of Anthedon. Closer to the lake was a settlement now unknown with an acropolis also dating to the Neolithic. The locality is called Palaiometochi, within the village of Pyrgos (termed Paralimni Pyrgos by Farinetti to distinguish it from all the other villages of that name). It seems clear that first, the three-lakes region was settled anciently, before the arrival of the Greeks, and second, that an ancient road along the south shore of Paralimni connected all the villages.

The west end of Lake Paralimni merges into the plain of Thebes. The mountains of Boeotia divide it into clusters of towns within which communication was easy, but outside of which, not. The Copais region to the northwest was under the domination of Orchomenos. The Anthedon region to the northeast was isolated on the coast by the mountains enclosing Paralimni. The plain of Thebes extended northward to the bridge between Hyliki and Paralimni, passing first through Mouriki.

== Ecology of Paralimni ==
Both Yliki and Paralimni, fringed by wetlands, are home to rare species of fish and birds. They are mainly protected areas.

== See also ==
- Lake Copais
- Lake Yliki
- Cephissus (Boeotia)
