= Cephissus (Boeotia) =

River in Greece

Boeotian Cephissus
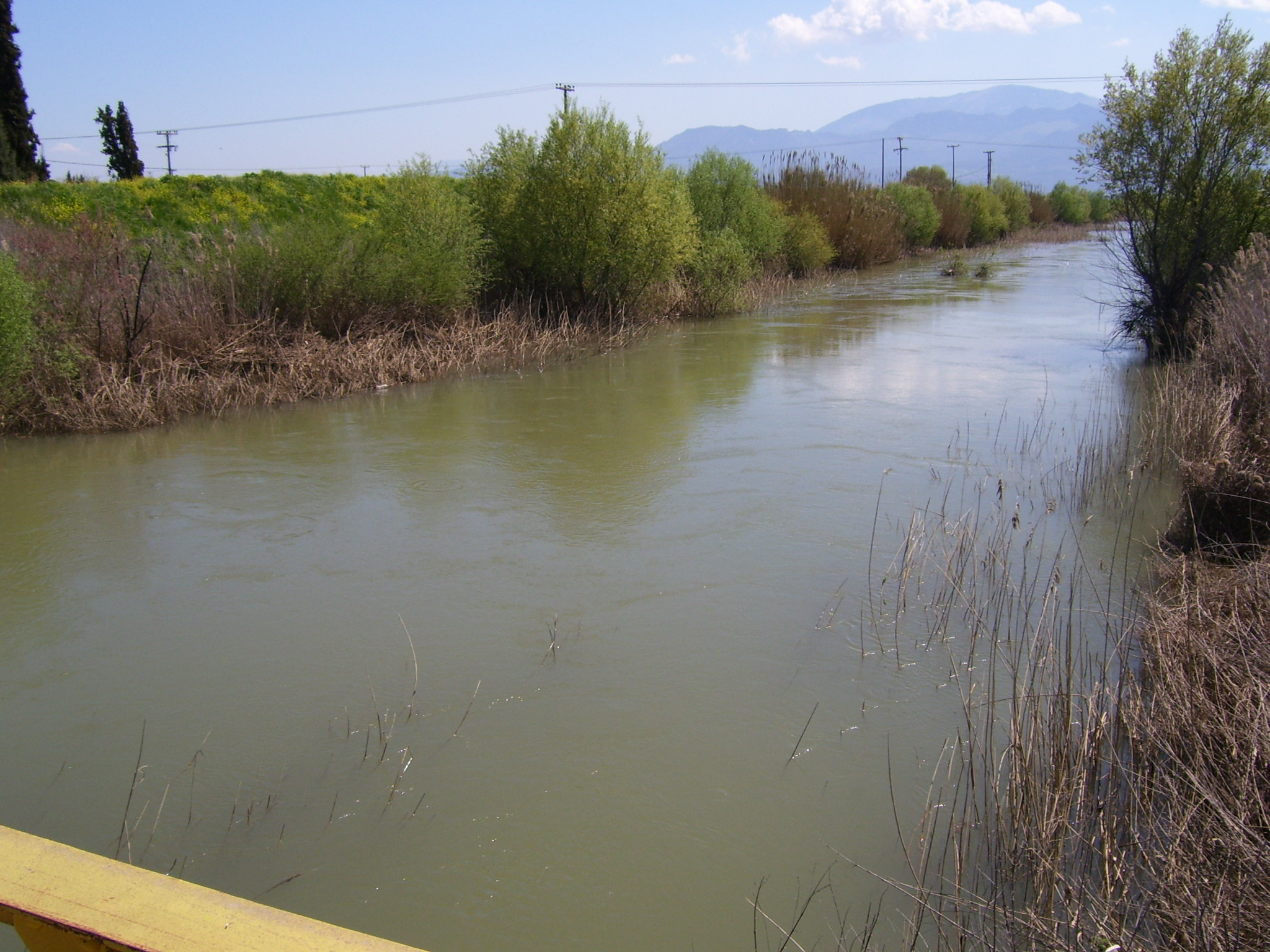

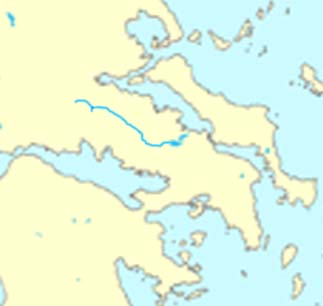
- Location of the Boeotian Cephissus in Central Greece
- Native name: Βοιωτικός Κηφισός (Greek)

Location
- Country: Greece

Physical characteristics
- Mouth
  - location: Lake Yliki
  - coordinates: 38°25′56″N 23°14′43″E
- Basin size: 1,958 km^{2} (756 sq mi)

The Cephissus (Ancient Greek: Κήφισσος), called the Boeotian Cephissus to distinguish it from other rivers of the same name, or Kifisos (Greek: Βοιωτικός Κηφισός) is a river in central Greece. Its drainage basin is 1,958 km^{2} (756 sq mi). The river rises at Lilaia in Phocis, on the northwestern slope of Mount Parnassus. It flows east through the Boeotian plain, passing the towns Amfikleia, Kato Tithorea and Orchomenos. It drained into Lake Copais, which was therefore also called the Cephisian Lake, until 1887, when the lake was eliminated in favor of agricultural land. An artificial outflow has been created to Lake Yliki (ancient Hylice), further east.

== Hydrology ==
The Cephisus, a post-glacial river, never had sufficient flow deriving from drainage to establish a clear channel to the Gulf of Euboea. Its main flow was seasonal melt water, which collected in a three-lake system in the lowlands of Boeotia. First it entered Lake Copais, which was never more than a wetland a few feet deep. Today it has been totally drained for agriculture, revealing katabothra, or caves in the karst topography leading down to Lake Yliki as well as Bronze-Age works to stem the flow. There was never enough cross-section to totally drain the marsh, and no surface channels between lakes.

The underground paths to Lake Yliki are now open, causing its level to rise sufficiently to drown all traces of Bronze-age settlement in its valley. Lake Yliki connects by underground channels to Lake Paralimni, which hangs over the Gulf of Euboea. It was never connected to the Gulf by surface channel, but some water is believed to have escaped via the Katabothra.

The artificial adjustment of the lake waters was an engineering problem of some magnitude in the 19th and early 20th centuries. In the later 20th century the waters of the two remaining lakes were preempted by the Athens aqueduct. The city of Athens had grown to include one-third of the population of Greece. Waters were being tapped from rivers as far away as western Greece through deep tunnels, which take advantage of the difference in altitude. The mountains are primarily of limestone, which is soft enough to present easy tunneling, whether under the Pindus mountains, beneath the passes of the Alps, or through the ridges of Italy.

== Mythology ==
In Greek mythology, the river god Cephissus was associated with this river. Pausanias records a Theban tradition that the river Cephissus formerly flowed under a mountain and entered the sea until Heracles blocked the passage and diverted the water into the Orchomenian plain. Pausanias also says that the Lilaeans on certain days threw cakes and other customary items into the spring of the Cephissus and that they would reappear in the Castalian Spring.

== History ==
The Cephissus valley is of strategic importance, connecting northern Greece via the passes of Mount Oeta and Mount Kallidromo (including Thermopylae) to southern Greece and the Gulf of Corinth. As a result, in the Frankish period a chain of forts and watchtowers was established along its course by the rulers of the Duchy of Athens.
