= Lake Copais =

Lake in Greece, now drained

Coordinates: 38.45°N 23.05°E

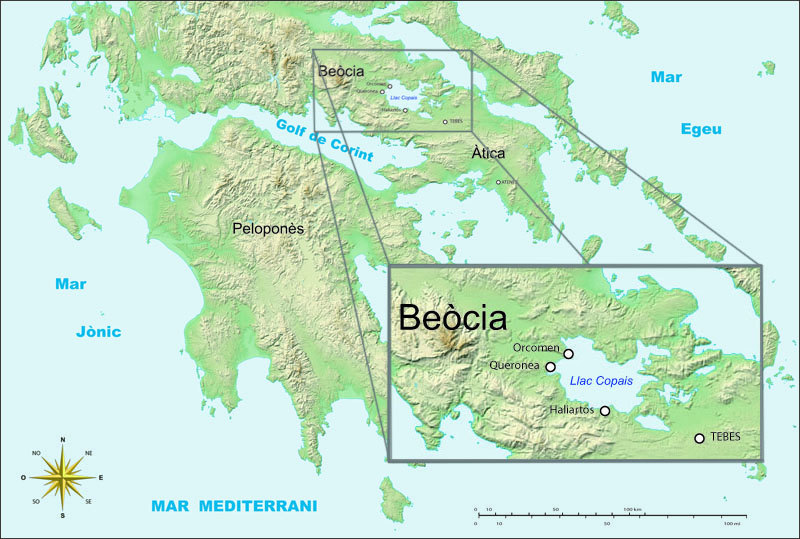
Location of Lake Copais

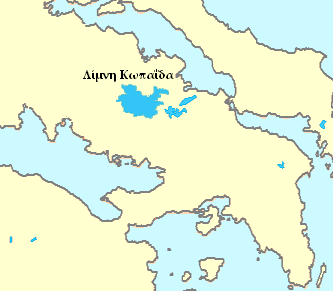
Lake Kopais

Lake Copais, also spelled Kopais or Kopaida (Ancient Greek: Κωπαΐς; Greek: Κωπαΐδα), was a lake in the centre of Boeotia, Greece, west of Thebes. It was first drained in the Bronze Age, and drained again in the late 19th century. It is now flat dry land and is still known as Kopaida. A one-time island in the lake was modified in ancient times into a megalithic citadel, now called Gla. Lake Copais is also featured in Ubisoft's Assassin's Creed Odyssey (2018).

== Drainage ==
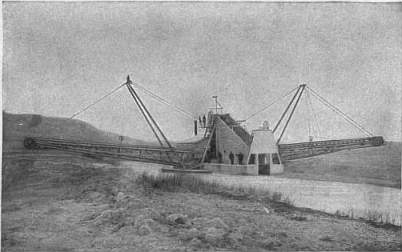
British-built Lake Copais Company dredger at work

When the lake existed, the towns of Haliartus, Orchomenus, and Chaeronea were on its shores. Rivers feeding the lake included the Cephissus, Termessus and Triton. The lake was (and is) surrounded by fertile land, but the lake increasingly encroached on the surrounding land because of inadequate drainage.

The first modern, though abortive, plans to drain the lake were made in 1834-1838. In 1865 a French company, Montferrier and Bonnair, signed a contract with the Greek government to drain the lake. But in 1873 after having drained the lake partially, the company went bankrupt and drainage of the lake was halted until 1880, when a new contract was signed with another French company. Though massive drainage works took place between 1882 and 1886, the attempt was unsuccessful: The organic material accumulated on the lake bottom was set ablaze, which caused the lake bed recede by ca. 4 m (13 ft) lower than the drainage canal and by 1887 the lake was filled again. This time a British company, Lake Copais Co Ltd., was contracted to continue the project, and the company successfully finished draining the lake by 1931 and recovering 241 km^{2} (93 sq mi) of land. The Greek government expropriated the recovered area in 1953, and redistributed it to landless farmers.

The Kopais Lake Agency was created in 1957 to supervise the draining of the lake and building of a new road. The task was completed that same year, but the agency with full-time staff of 30 (including a driver for the president of the agency) still existed until 2010.

Before this the lake drained into the sea by numerous subterranean channels. Some of these channels were artificial, as the 1st century geographer Strabo recorded. Modern excavation has found enormous channels dug in the 14th century BC which drained water into the sea to the northeast; Strabo mentions work being done on these channels by an engineer named Crates of Chalcis in the time of Alexander the Great.

== Drainage in antiquity ==
Several attempts at partial or complete drainage of lake Copais were made in antiquity. First during the Bronze Age, and later during the Roman Times.

During the Bronze Age, the Mycenaeans drained the lake partially by diverting a portion of water volume feeding it towards natural sinkholes situated near the eastern end of the lake and through them eventually to the sea. The Bronze Age draining attempts happened at least in two phases. First attempt was made by building low earth dams totalling in length to ca. 22 km (14 mi) to gain land from the lake. Excavated remains indicate that up to 400,000,000 m^{3} of stone and roughly 200,000,000 m^{3} of earth were moved to build the dams. However, after the dams failed another, apparently more successful, attempt was made by constructing a ca. 25 km (16 mi) long canal conveying water from the lake basin towards natural sinkholes northeast of the lake. At this point the lake basin was divided into two, one north and another south of the levee, leading to partial reclamation of the southern part of the basin. An incomplete tunnel with planned length of 2.2 km (1.4 mi) at Kephalari, close to the sinkholes, leading water rivers Cephissus and Melas to a small torrent leading eventually to the Euboean Gulf may also be a Bronze Age work; however, currently there is no consensus about the matter and some researchers date the tunnel much later, perhaps during the Hellenistic period. The drainage system collapsed during the Late Helladic IIIB or Late Helladic IIIC at the latest.

In the Roman Times, two drainage attempts are documented. The first attempt is attributed to a local Epameinondas Epameinondou, and the second to the Emperor Hadrian.

== Lake Copais in ancient literature and mythology ==
Map of ancient Boeotia.

There was a legend that the lake came into being when the hero Heracles flooded the area by digging out a river, the Cephissus, which poured into the basin. Polyaenus explains that he did this because he was fighting the Minyans of Orchomenus: they were dangerous horseback fighters, and Heracles dug the lake in order to unhorse them. Another story has the lake overflow in the mythical time of Ogyges, resulting in the Ogygian deluge.

The travel writer Pausanias and the 5th century BC comic playwright Aristophanes record that in antiquity Lake Copais was known for its fish, especially the eels.
