= Rutilus stoumboudae =

Conservation status
- Least Concern (IUCN 3.1)

Scientific classification
- Kingdom: Animalia
- Phylum: Chordata
- Class: Actinopterygii
- Order: Cypriniformes
- Family: Leuciscidae
- Genus: Rutilus
- Species: R. stoumboudae

Binomial name
- Rutilus stoumboudae Bianco & Ketmaier, 2014

Species of fish

Rutilus stoumboudae is a species of freshwater fish in the family Cyprinidae. It is found only in Greece, in Lake Volvi and is a lacustrine species adapted to still water. It is named for Maria Stoumboudi, in honour of her research on the ecology and conservation of the freshwater fishes of Greece.

== Description ==
Rutilus stoumboudae grows to a maximum size of 15.6 cm (6.1 in), and can distinguished from its congener R. rutilus by having 16-17 total gill rakers (vs. 13–14) and an average of 9 branched rays (vs. 10 in R. rutilus) in both the dorsal and anal fins, from a total of 11-12 and 12 soft rays, respectively. It can be diagnosed from R. pigus by the absence of nuptial tubercles, and having 39-43 scales on the lateral line (vs. 46–51) and 8-9 branched rays in the anal fin (vs. 9–11)

== Taxonomy and systematics ==
Rutilus stoumboudae was described as a distinct species in 2014.

In a 2017 phylogeographic study, it was argued that the Ponto-Caspian taxa including R. caspicus, R. heckelii and R. stoumboudae could represent a single widespread species whose range would extend to Siberia, to be named R. lacustris.
