= Leucos albus =

Conservation status
- Endangered (IUCN 3.1)

Scientific classification
- Kingdom: Animalia
- Phylum: Chordata
- Class: Actinopterygii
- Order: Cypriniformes
- Family: Leuciscidae
- Subfamily: Leuciscinae
- Genus: Leucos
- Species: L. albus

Binomial name
- Leucos albus (Marić, 2010)

Synonyms
- Rutilus albus Marić, 2010

Species of fish

Leucos albus, the white roach, is a species of freshwater ray-finned fish belonging to the family Leuciscidae, which includes the daces, Eurasian minnows and related fishes. This species is found in the Lake Skadar drainage system in Albania and Montenegro.

== Taxonomy ==
Leucos albus was first formally described as Rutilus albus in 2010 by the Montenegrin zoologist Drago Marić, with its type locality given as Lake Skadar at a sublacustrine spring near Vaskaut at 42°06'26.30"N, 19°17'12.81"E in Montenegro. It is now classified as a valid species in the genus Leucos within the subfamily Leuciscinae of the family Leuciscidae.

== Etymology ==
Leucos albus belongs to the genus Leucos. This name is derived from the Greek leukos, which means "white". The genus was named by Johann Jakob Heckel, and he did not explain why he chose this name. It may refer to the silvery colour of Squalius aula. The specific name, albus, is Latin for "white", also referring to the colour of this fish.

== Description ==
Leucos albus has its dorsal and anal fins each supported by 11 soft rays. It can be distinguished from the sympatric and closely related Albanian roach (L. basak) in having between 41 and 44 pored scales on the lateral line, rather than between 37 and 39 in the Albanian roach. The most common number of branched rays in the dorsal fin is 8 in the white roach and 9 in the Albanian roach. There are no markings on the flanks. This species has a maximum published total length 25.9 cm (10.2 in).

== Distribution and habitat ==
Leucos albus is endemic to the drainage basin of Lake Skadar in Albania and Montenegro, having been recorded in the Crnojević River and the lowermost reaches of the Morača River. The white roach is most numerous in Lake Skadar, gathering in large shoals near sublacustrine springs in the winter.

== Biology ==
Leucos albus is omnivorous, eating algae, zooplankton and small invertebrates. They live for at least six years, reaching sexual maturity from two years old. The spawning season runs from late winter into spring.
