= Kutum (disambiguation) =

Kutum is a town in the Sudanese state of North Darfur.

Kutum may also refer to:

- Caspian kutum, Rutilus kutum, a fish in the carp family from the Caspian Sea and its freshwater tributaries
- Vyrezub, Rutilus frisii, a fish in the carp family from the Black Sea, Sea of Azov, and Sea of Marmara, and their freshwater tributaries
- Kutum River, a tributary of Volga River
- Kutum Volcanic Field, Sudan
