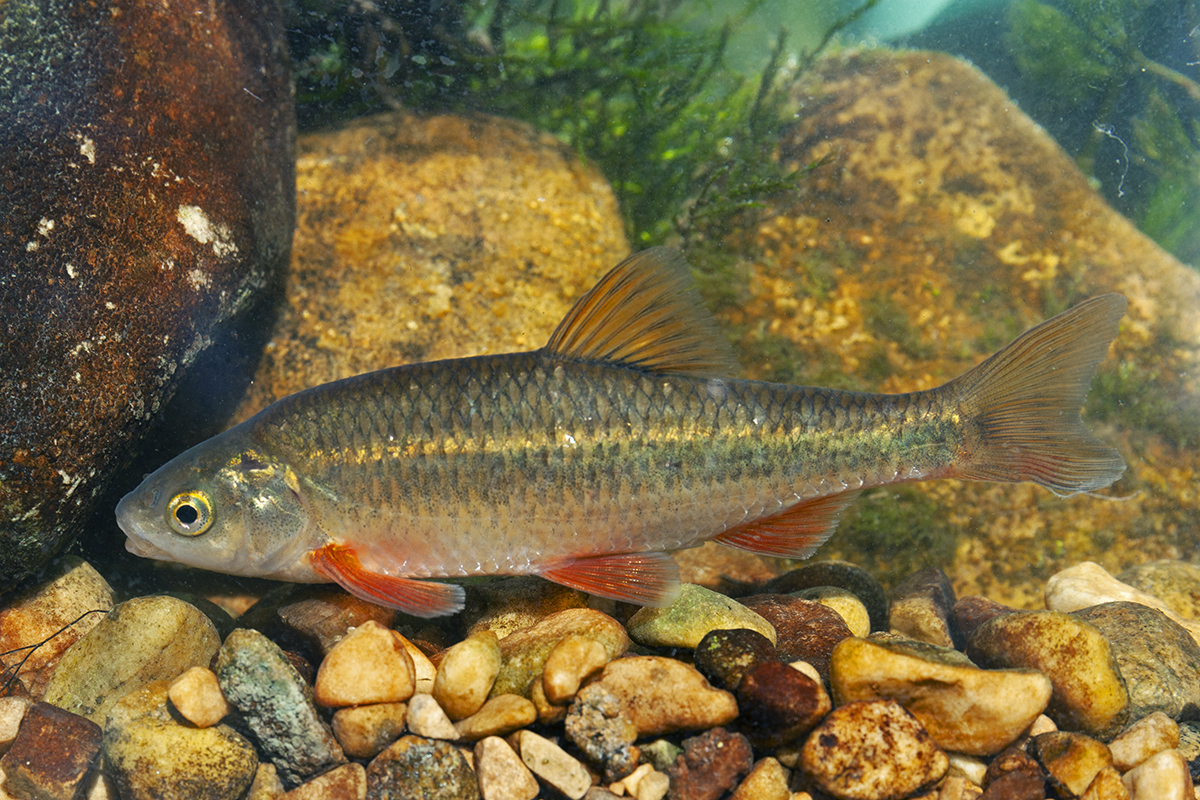

Conservation status
- Vulnerable (IUCN 3.1)

Scientific classification
- Kingdom: Animalia
- Phylum: Chordata
- Class: Actinopterygii
- Order: Cypriniformes
- Family: Leuciscidae
- Subfamily: Leuciscinae
- Genus: Sarmarutilus; Bianco & Ketmaier, 2014
- Species: S. rubilio

Binomial name
- Sarmarutilus rubilio (Bonaparte, 1837)

Synonyms
- Leuciscus rubilio Bonaparte, 1837; Rutilus rubilio (Bonaparte, 1837); Leuciscus rubella Bonaparte, 1837; Leuciscus trasimenicus Bonaparte, 1837; Leuciscus fucini Bonaparte, 1838; Leuciscus lascha Costa, 1838; Leuciscus sardella Valenciennes, 1844; Leucos henlei Bonaparte, 1846; Rutilus italicus Calderoni, 1981

= Sarmarutilus =

Monotypic genus of fish

Sarmarutilus is a monospecific genus of freshwater ray-finned fish belonging to the family Leuciscidae, which includes the daces, Eurasian minnows and related fishes. The only species in this genus is Sarmarutilus rubilio, known as the rovella, South European roach or the Apennine roach, a species endemic to the Italian Peninsula.

== Taxonomy ==
Sarmarutilus was first proposed as a genus in 2014 by Pier Giorgio Bianco and Valerio Ketmaier with Leuciscus rubilio being its type species by monotypy. L. rubilio was first formally described in 1837 by the French art collector and biologist Charles Lucien Bonaparte with its type locality given as Lake Nemi. L. rubilio was subsequently classified in the genus Rutilus but was which was reclassified in 2014 into the new monotypic Sarmarutilus. This lineage is thought to have originated in the Sarmatic Sea in the Middle Miocene and reached the Mediterranean area during the Lago Mare phase, and then survived only in the Tuscany-Latium district.

The sister group of Sarmarutilus is the genus Leucos of five roach species. Unlike Rutilus and Leucos, Sarmarutilus is a riverine fish of running waters. It differs from Leucos by having large pearl organs on the central part of head and body scales of males. From Rutilus it differs in the pharyngeal teeth formula and by its small size.

== Etymology ==
Sarmarutilus puts sarma, from the Sarma Sea in front of the name of the roach genus Rutilus, the Sarma Sea was a Miocene European freshwater waterbody where this species has its evolutionary origins. The specific name, rubilio, thought to be a diminutive of rubella, a reference to the similarity of the head shape and head proportion to that of Leuciscus rubella, now considered a synonym of L. rubilio.

== Description ==
Samarutilus differs from the related genera Rutilus and Leucos in the following characteristics: the pharyngeal teeth number 5 on each side; breeding males have nuptial tubercles at the centre of each scale on the head and body; the lateral stripe is obscured by a crescent-shaped area of dense pigmentation created by obvious triangular spots on each scale crescent. This species has a maximum standard length of 18 cm (7.1 in).

== Distribution and habitat ==
Samarutilus is endemic to Italy where it is found from the Magra River south to the Sele River on the drainage basins of the Ligurian Sea and Tyrrhenian Sea, and from the Tronto River to the Trigno River in the Adriatic drainage basin. The precise extent of its native range is unknown as it has been widely introduced to rivers to the south of its known native range, as far as Sicily. The rovella is considered to be a habitat generalist but tends to be absent in the deeper slower flowing reaches of rivers, preferring upper reaches with clear water, rocky to stony substrates and aquatic vegetation, in some areas it will enter drainage channels, lakes and reservoirs.
