= Dorcadion jacobsoni =

Scientific classification
- Kingdom: Animalia
- Phylum: Arthropoda
- Clade: Pancrustacea
- Class: Insecta
- Order: Coleoptera
- Suborder: Polyphaga
- Infraorder: Cucujiformia
- Family: Cerambycidae
- Genus: Dorcadion
- Species: D. jacobsoni

Binomial name
- Dorcadion jacobsoni Jakovlev, 1899

Synonyms
- Dorcadion amymon Jakovlev, 1906; Dorcadion conicolle Breuning, 1946; Dorcadion dsungaricum Pic, 1907; Dorcadion melancholicum Pic, 1907; Dorcadion obtusicolle Pic, 1926; ?Dorcadion merzbacheri Breuning, 1946; ?Dorcadion samarkandiae Breuning, 1946

Species of beetle

Dorcadion jacobsoni is a species of beetle in the family Cerambycidae. It was described by Vasily Yakovlev in 1899. It is known from China and Kazakhstan.

== Varietas ==
- Dorcadion jacobsoni var. apicipenne Jakovlev, 1900
- Dorcadion jacobsoni var. sokolovi Jakovlev, 1900
