= Dorcadion komarowi =

Scientific classification
- Kingdom: Animalia
- Phylum: Arthropoda
- Clade: Pancrustacea
- Class: Insecta
- Order: Coleoptera
- Suborder: Polyphaga
- Infraorder: Cucujiformia
- Family: Cerambycidae
- Genus: Dorcadion
- Species: D. komarowi

Binomial name
- Dorcadion komarowi Jakovlev, 1887

Synonyms
- Dorcadion interruptum Jakovlev, 1895; Dorcadion transcaspicum Jakovlev, 1901

Species of beetle

Dorcadion komarowi is a species of beetle in the family Cerambycidae. It was described by Vasily Yakovlev in 1887.

== Subspecies ==
- Dorcadion komarowi komarowi Jakovlev, 1887
- Dorcadion komarowi kryzhanovskii Plavilstshikov, 1958
