= Dorcadion pantherinum =

Scientific classification
- Kingdom: Animalia
- Phylum: Arthropoda
- Clade: Pancrustacea
- Class: Insecta
- Order: Coleoptera
- Suborder: Polyphaga
- Infraorder: Cucujiformia
- Family: Cerambycidae
- Genus: Dorcadion
- Species: D. pantherinum

Binomial name
- Dorcadion pantherinum Jakovlev, 1900

Species of beetle

Dorcadion pantherinum is a species of beetle in the family Cerambycidae. It was described by Vasily Yakovlev in 1900.

== Subspecies ==
- Dorcadion pantherinum desertum Danilevsky, 1995
- Dorcadion pantherinum pantherinum Jakovlev, 1900
- Dorcadion pantherinum sabulosum Danilevsky, 1995
- Dorcadion pantherinum shamaevi Danilevsky, 1995

== See also ==
- Dorcadion
