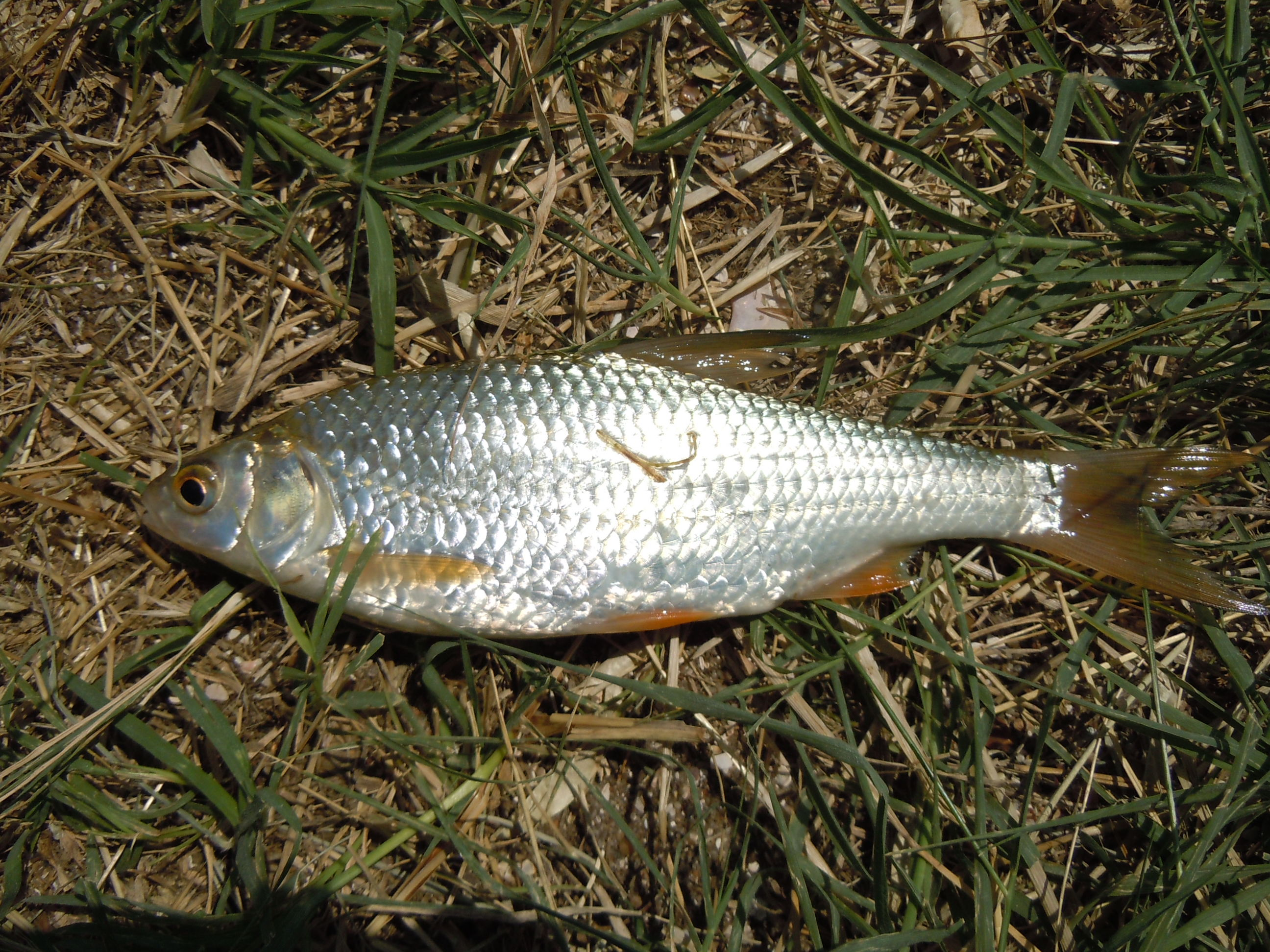

Conservation status
- Least Concern (IUCN 3.1)

Scientific classification
- Kingdom: Animalia
- Phylum: Chordata
- Class: Actinopterygii
- Order: Cypriniformes
- Family: Leuciscidae
- Subfamily: Leuciscinae
- Genus: Rutilus
- Species: R. heckelii

Binomial name
- Rutilus heckelii (Nordmann, 1840)

Synonyms
- Leuciscus heckelii Nordmann, 1840

= Rutilus heckelii =

Species of fish

Rutilus heckelii is a species of freshwater and brackish water ray-finned fish belonging to the family Leuciscidae, which includes the daces, Eurasian minnows and related fishes. This species occurs in freshened areas of Black and Azov Seas, entering the river drainages that flow into those seas, as well as in some rivers draining into the Aegean Sea.

== Taxonomy ==
Rutilus heckelii was first formally described as Leuciscus heckelii in 1840 by the Finnish zoologist Alexander von Nordmann with its type locality given as Crimea, Black Sea, Ukraine. This species is now classified within the genus Rutilus in the subfamily Leuciscinae of the family Leuciscidae. Some research, however, suggests that R. heckelii may be a part of a more widely distributed species of roach, whose range extends to Siberia. The proper name of that species is Rutilus lacustris, although this has not accepted by Eschmeyer's Catalog of Fishes and other, later, authors.

== Etymology ==
Rutilus heckelii belongs to the genus Rutilus, a name which means "red, golden red and reddish yellow" and is an allusion to the red colour of the fins. The specific name is an eponym which honours Johann Jakob Heckel, Nordmann's friend at the Natural History Museum, Vienna in recognition of his advice and assistance.

== Description ==
Rutilus heckeli can be told apart from other roaches in the Black Sea basin by its laterally compressed body, having between 39 and 41 scales along the lateral line, the dorsal and anal fin both typically have 10 1/2 branched fin rays, the mouth is downward pointing, the iris is silvery to yellow, the paired fins and the anal fin are grey with dark margins. The breeding males develop nuptial tubercles on the head and on each scale on the flank. This species has a maximum standard length of 43 cm (17 in).

== Distribution and habitat ==
Rutilus heckelii is found in the Black Sea and Sea of Azov basins in Eastern Europe where it occurs in all the rivers draining into those seas. It is also found in the Aegean basin where it occurs in the rivers from Lake Volvi east in Greece and East Thrace. This species spends most of the year in shallow, brackish coastal waters with the adults being most abundant at depths between 2.5 and 4 m (8 ft 2 in. and 13 ft 1 in. respectively) depth and at salinities of 2-4 ppm during summer. They enter freshwater in estuaries, lagoons and lower reaches of large rivers to spawn.

== Biology ==
Rutilus heckelii starts to move closer to the coast in August and into the rivers in September, peaking in October and stopping by the end of November. It then overwinters in the main river channel or in estuaries. The spawning migration recommences when the ice on the rivers breaks up. Spawning starts in April and May, and the adults descend the rivers immediately after spawning is complete, with the juveniles moving downstream to the estuaries in August after hatching.

== Utilisation ==
Rutilus heckelii is commonly air-dried and salted, as are related species of roach, to create a popular beer snack, Russia, other countries of the former Soviet Union and parts of Eastern Europe, known as 'taran' or 'taranka', after the Russian word for this fish species, 'тарань'.

== See also ==
- Caspian roach
