= Leucos panosi =

Conservation status
- Endangered (IUCN 3.1)

Scientific classification
- Kingdom: Animalia
- Phylum: Chordata
- Class: Actinopterygii
- Order: Cypriniformes
- Family: Leuciscidae
- Subfamily: Leuciscinae
- Genus: Leucos
- Species: L. panosi

Binomial name
- Leucos panosi (Bogutskaya & Iliadou, 2006)

Synonyms
- Rutilus panosi Bogutskaya & Iliadou, 2006

Species of fish

Leucos panosi, also known as the Achelous roach, is a species of freshwater ray-finned fish belonging to the family Leuciscidae, which includes the daces, Eurasian minnows and related fishes. This species is endemic to Western mainland Greece.

== Taxonomy ==
Leucos panosi was first formally described as Rutilus panosi in 2010 by the Russian ichthyologist Bogutskaya and the Greek ichthyologist Konstantina Iliadou, with its type locality given as Trichinos Lake in Greece. It is now classified as a valid species in the genus Leucos within the subfamily Leuciscinae of the family Leuciscidae.

== Etymology ==
Leucos panosi belongs to the genus Leucos, the name of which is derived from the Greek leukos, which means "white". The genus was named by Johann Jakob Heckel, who did not explain why he chose this name; it may refer to the silvery colour of Leucos aula. The specific name, panosi, honours the Greek ichthyologist Panos Stavros Economidis, who realised that this was an undescribed species in 1991.

== Description ==
Leucos panosi has 12 soft rays supporting the dorsal fin and 11 supporting the anal fin. One feature which distinguishes the Achelous roach from other species in the genus Leucos is its moderate size, almost never exceeding 16 or 17 cm (6.3 or 6.7 in), typically between 12 and 14 cm (4.7 and 5.5 in) standard length. It is also separable by the lack of a dark midlateral band, and the peritoneal membrane being covered in a dense patter of black melanophores. The maximum published total length for this species is 29.1 cm (11.5 in), with a maximum published weight of 355.7 g (12.55 oz).

== Distribution and habitat ==
Leucos panosi has a native range which is restricted to the upper drainage of the Achelous River in Western Greece. It has been recorded from lakes Trichonida, Lysimachia, Ozeros and Amvrakia. It has been introduced to the lower Thyamis and lakes Pamvotida and Ziros in Epirus, as well as Lake Taka in the Pelopponese. The Achelous roach is found in very slow moving or still river reaches, drainage channels and in the pelagic zone of lakes.

== Biology ==
Leucos panosi feed on invertebraes and plant matter when juveniles, with the larger fish feeding on snails and freshwater mussels. It spawns in shallow, sandy areas where there is submerged vegetation, laying adhesive eggs which are 1 to 1.4mm in diameter. It is thought that spawning may start in late January and extend into March and April.

== Conservation ==
Leucos panosi is classified as Vulnerable by the International Union for Conservation of Nature because it has a restricted range, and because the quality of its habitat is being degraded by damming, pollution, water abstraction and the introduction of the invavsive, predatory wels catfish (Silurus glanis).
