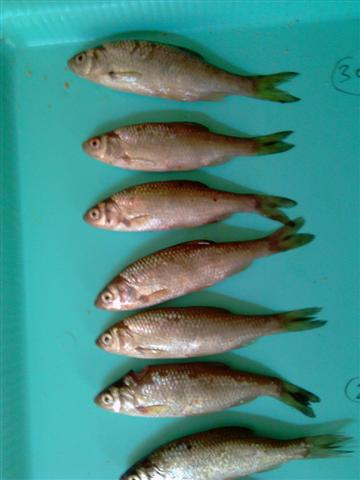

Conservation status
- Least Concern (IUCN 3.1)

Scientific classification
- Kingdom: Animalia
- Phylum: Chordata
- Class: Actinopterygii
- Division: Teleostei
- Order: Cypriniformes
- Family: Leuciscidae
- Subfamily: Leuciscinae
- Genus: Leucos
- Species: L. basak

Binomial name
- Leucos basak Heckel, 1843

Synonyms
- Rutilus basak (Heckel 1843); Rutilus rubella karamani Fowler, 1977; Leucos aula var. ohridana Karaman, 1924; Leucos aula var. prespensis Karaman, 1924; Rutilus prespensis vukovici Marić, 1988

= Leucos basak =

Species of fish

Leucos basak, the Albanian roach, Dalmatian roach or Croatian roach, is a species of freshwater ray-finned fish belonging to the family Leuciscidae, which includes daces, Eurasian minnow and related fishes. It is found in the Balkan Peninsula, where its natural habitats are intermittent rivers and freshwater lakes.

== Taxonomy ==
Leucos basak was first formally described in 1843 by the Austrian ichthyologist Johann Jakob Heckel, with its type locality given as Croatia. It is a species in the genus Leucos within the subfamily Leuciscinae of the family Leuciscidae.

== Etymology ==
Leucos basak belongs to the genus Leucos. This name is derived from the Greek leukos, meaning "white". The genus was named by Johann Jakob Heckel. He did not explain why he chose this name, but it may refer to the silvery colour of Squalius aula. The specific name, basak, is the Croatian common name for this species.

== Description ==
Leucos basak has its dorsal and anal fins each supported by 11 soft rays. It can be distinguished from the other species in the genus Leucos by its moderate size, typically having a standard length between 12 and 14 cm (4.7 and 5.5 in), the absence of a mid-lateral band; the body is plain silvery in life, the peritoneal membrane is black and there are normally 36-38 pored scales on the lateral line, less than the other Leucos species. This species has a maximum published total length of 23.3 cm (9.2 in).

== Distribution and habitat ==
Leucos basak is endemic to the western Balkans. It is found from the Neretva River in Bosnia and Herzegovina and Croatia south to the Bojana in Montenegro and Albania, including the Lake Skadar, Lake Ohrid and Prespa basins. The Albanian roach is found in shallow reaches of karstic streams with slow currents and rivers, oligotrophic lakes, backwaters and reservoirs with abundant vegetation.
