= Rutilus sojuchbulagi =

Conservation status
- Extinct (IUCN 3.1)

Scientific classification
- Kingdom: Animalia
- Phylum: Chordata
- Class: Actinopterygii
- Order: Cypriniformes
- Family: Leuciscidae
- Genus: Rutilus
- Species: †R. sojuchbulagi

Binomial name
- †Rutilus sojuchbulagi Abdurakhmanov, 1950

Synonyms
- Pseudophoxinus sojuchbulagi (Abdurakhmanov, 1950)

Extinct species of ray-finned fish

Rutilus sojuchbulagi, the Akstafa spring roach, is an extinct species of ray-finned fish in the family Leuciscidae. It was found in the Ağstafa Region of the Kura River in Azerbaijan. It was last recorded in 1948. None were found in two more recent searches, and was declared extinct by the IUCN in 2019.
