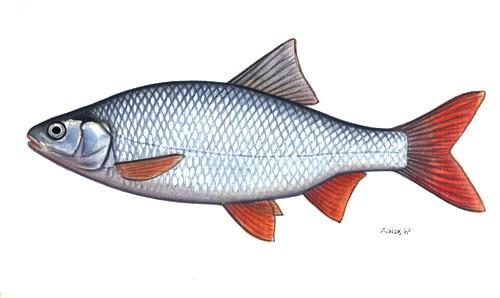

Conservation status
- Least Concern (IUCN 3.1)

Scientific classification
- Kingdom: Animalia
- Phylum: Chordata
- Class: Actinopterygii
- Order: Cypriniformes
- Family: Leuciscidae
- Subfamily: Leuciscinae
- Genus: Rutilus
- Species: R. virgo

Binomial name
- Rutilus virgo (Heckel, 1852)

Synonyms
- Leuciscus virgo Heckel, 1852; Rutilus pigo virgo (Heckel, 1852); Rutilus pigus virgo (Heckel, 1852)

= Cactus roach =

Species of fish

The cactus roach (Rutilus virgo) is a species of freshwater ray-finned fish belonging to the family Leuciscidae, which includes the daces, Eurasian minnows and related fishes. This species occurs in central and eastern Europe, including the northern Balkans.

== Taxonomy ==
The cactus roach was first formally described as Leuciscus virgo in 1852 by the Austrian zoologist Johann Jakob Heckel with its type locality given as the Danube River near Vienna in Austria. This species is now classified within the genus Rutilus in the subfamily Leuciscinae of the family Leuciscidae. This species and the pigo or Italian roach (R. pigus), of the northern Adriatic basin, were previously considered to be the same species. However, molecular analyses published since the late 2000s have shown that these are two separate valid species.

== Etymology ==
The cactus roach belongs to the genus Rutilus, a name which means "red, golden red and reddish yellow" and is an allusion to the red colour of the fins of the common roach R. rutilus), the type species of the genus. The specific name, virgo, means "maid" or "maiden", this is probably derived a German vernacular name for this species, fraufisch meaning "womanfish", another being frauennerfling.

== Description ==
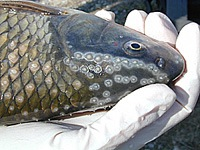
Head of breeding male

The cactus roach is told apart from the other roaches in the Danube basin by having a black peritoneum and the anal fin typically has 11 to 12 1/2 branched fin rays. The breeding males have two rows of nuptial tubercles on the side of the head above the eyes, these are fused to form ridges, with very large tubercles on the body. There are between 44 and 46 scales along the lateral line, the body is laterally compressed, and the snout is blunt and rounded and the mouth is subterminal. The colour of the body is greenish to bluish brown with the iris being silvery. This species has a maximum standard length of 40 cm (16 in).

== Distribution and habitat ==
The cactus roach is found in central and eastern Europe where it is indigenous to the drainage system of the Danube from Baden-Württemberg in southern Germany to the Iron Gates on the frontier between Serbia and Romania. The true extent of its distribution is unclear because the sheer size of the Danube and its tributaries make comprehensive surveys very difficult. It appears to be restricted to the lower reaches of rivers draining northern slopes of the Alps in southern Germany and Austria, and its known distribution in the Tisza River system is made up of a comparatively small area where the borders of Hungary, Slovakia and Ukraine meet. Since 2010 the cactus roach has been recorded from a number of new sites in Ukraine, although these all are within around 30 km (19 mi) of the previous known edge of its distribution. On the other hand, historical records from the Morava River suggest that it used to occur upstream as far as the Thaya River in Austria and beyond Olomouc in the Czech Republic, several hundred kilometres of linear river length. However, recent records appear to show that this species is probably only found to the lowermost stretch of the river.

The cactus roach is mainly found in deep stretches of rivers with a current.

== Biology ==
The cactus roach feeds on benthic invertebrates all year and adds periphyton and plant matter to its diet in summer. In the spawning season the adults migrate upstream to spawn at specific sites in reaches with aquatic vegetation and well washed gravel in riffles in water less than 50 cm (20 in) in depth.
