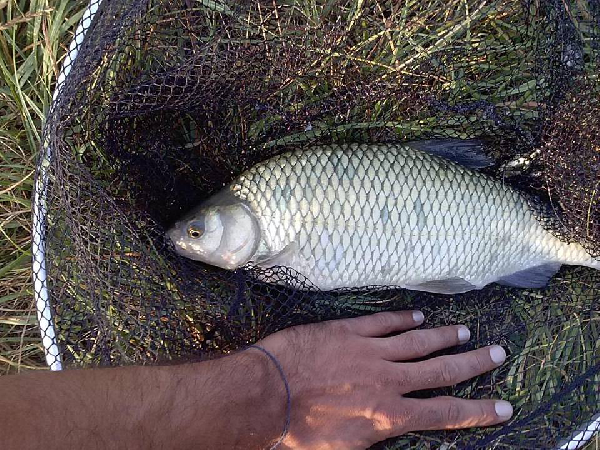

Conservation status
- Vulnerable (IUCN 3.1)

Scientific classification
- Kingdom: Animalia
- Phylum: Chordata
- Class: Actinopterygii
- Order: Cypriniformes
- Family: Leuciscidae
- Genus: Rutilus
- Species: R. pigus

Binomial name
- Rutilus pigus (Lacépède, 1803)

Synonyms
- Cyprinus pigus Lacepède, 1803; Leuciscus roseus Bonaparte, 1839; Leuciscus ryzela Valenciennes, 1844

= Pigo =

Species of fish

The pigo (Rutilus pigus), or Italian roach, is a species of freshwater ray-finned fish belonging to the family Leuciscidae, which includes the daces, Eurasian minnows and related fishes. This species is found in northern Italy and southern Switzerland.

== Taxonomy ==
The pigo was first formally described as Cyprinus pigus in 1803 by the French naturalist Bernard Germain de Lacépède with its type locality given as Lake Como, Lake Maggiore and other lakes of Italy. This species is now classified within the genus Rutilus in the subfamily Leuciscinae of the family Leuciscidae. This species was previously considered to be the same species as the cactus roach (Rutilus virgo), of the Danube River system. However, molecular analyses published since the late 2000s have shown that these are two separate valid species.

== Etymology ==
The pigo belongs to the genus Rutilus, a name which means "red, golden red and reddish yellow" and is an allusion to the red colour of the fins of the common roach R. rutilus), the type species of the genus. The specific name, pigus, is a latinisation of the Latinization of the Italian name for this species, pigo or picho. This name dates to at least 1558 when Hippolito Salviani included it in his Aquatilium animalium. In 1560 Conrad Gessner stated that the name is derived from the German becken, meaning "to beat or strike" or bicken, which means "to prick", a reference to the sharp, pointed nuptial tubercles on males.

== Description ==
The pigo is told apart from the other roaches in Italy by having a black peritoneum and the males having two rows of nuptial tubercles on the side of the head above the eyes. The lower row has between 8 and 11 tubercles, the upper one has 3 to 6. These tubercles on body and head are conical, acutely pointed, forward pointing, and take up around 1/3 of the exposed area of their scale. Additional identification features include having between 43 and 46 scales along the lateral line, there are 10 1/2 branched fin rays in the dorsal fin and 11 1/2 in the anal fin, the inferior mouth and laterally compressed body, a silvery iris, the flanks are golden-bronze, marbled with black, and the snout is conical. This species has a maximum standard length of 45 cm (18 in), although25 cm (9.8 in) is more typical, and a maximum weight of 2 kg (4.4 lb).

== Distribution and habitat ==
The pigo is found in the northern basin of the Adriatic Sea in Italy and Switzerland between the Po east to the Livenza, including Lakes Como, Maggiore, Lugano, Garda, Iseo and other fluvial lakes on the left bank of the Po drainage system. Introductions of this species to Arno River system, which flows into the Ligurian Sea, as well as some lakes in the Appennino Tosco-Emiliano National Park and to Lazio, but there is a lack of information on these. The Italian roach is found in oligotrophic, subalpine lakes and slow-moving reaches of large perennial river channels. It has colonised some lakes resulting from gravel extraction in the upper Po Valley.

== Conservation ==
The pigo is classified as Vulnerable by the International Union for Conservation of Nature. It has a restricted range and its habitat is being degraded by many anthropogenic factors including pollution, damming, water abstraction and non-native invasive species.
