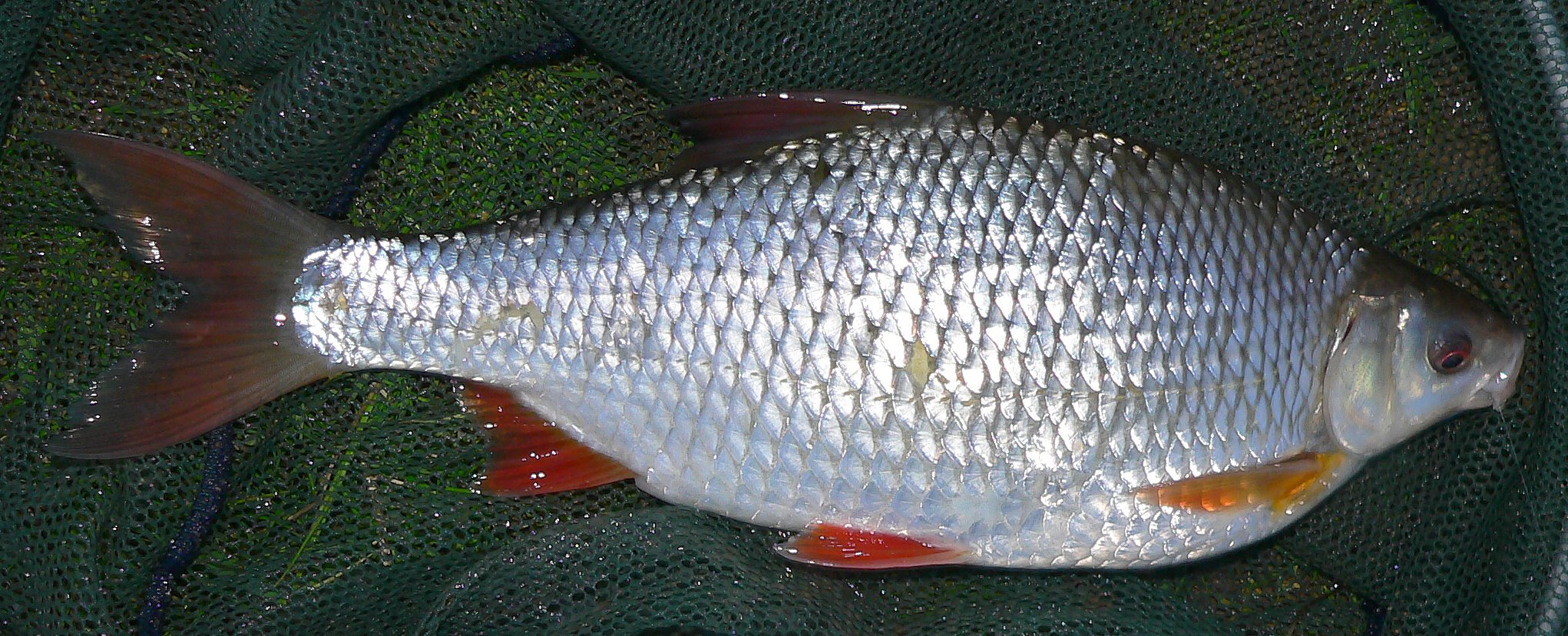
- Common roach (Rutilus rutilus)

Scientific classification
- Kingdom: Animalia
- Phylum: Chordata
- Class: Actinopterygii
- Division: Teleostei
- Order: Cypriniformes
- Family: Leuciscidae
- Subfamily: Leuciscinae
- Genus: Rutilus; Rafinesque, 1820

Type species
- Cyprinus rutilus Linnaeus, 1758

Synonyms
- Cenisophius Bonaparte, 1846; Gardonus Bonaparte, 1846; Metallites Schulze, 1890; Orfus Fitzinger, 1873; Pararutilus Berg, 1912; Pigus Bonaparte, 1846; Rubellus Fitzinger, 1873

= Rutilus =

Genus of fishes

Rutilus, commonly known as roaches, is a genus of freshwater ray-finned fish belonging to the family Leuciscidae, which includes the daces, Eurasian minnows and related fishes. This genus is a widely distributed lineage of leuciscids and ranges from West Europe to East Siberia.

== Taxonomy ==
Rutilus was first proposed as a genus in 1820 by the French polymath Constantine Samuel Rafinesque with Cyprinus rutilus designated as the type species but also the type species by absolute tautonymy. Cyprinus rutilus was first formally described in the 10th edition of Systema Naturae by Carl Linnaeus with "European lakes" given as the type locality.

In a phylogeographic study, Levin et al. (2017) argue that the Ponto-Caspian taxa including R. caspicus, R. heckelii and R. stoumboudae could represent a single widespread species whose range extends to Siberia, to be named Rutilus lacustris, whereas R. kutum is included in R. frisii.

The genera Leucos and Sarmarutilus have been recently separated from Rutilus and are closely related to it.

== Etymology ==
Rutilus was chosen as the genus name by tautonymy with Cyprinus rutilus; rutilus means red, golden red or reddish yellow, and is an allusion to the red colour of the fins.

== Species ==
Rutilus contains the following valid species:

- Rutilus caspicus (Yakovlev, 1870) (Caspian roach)
- Rutilus frisii (Nordmann, 1840) (Black Sea roach)
- Rutilus heckelii (Nordmann, 1840)
- Rutilus kutum (Kamensky, 1901) (Kutum)
- Rutilus lacustris (Pallas, 1814) (Pontic roach)
- Rutilus meidingeri (Heckel, 1851) (Pearlfish)
- Rutilus pigus (Lacépède, 1803) (Pigo)
- Rutilus rutilus (Linnaeus, 1758) (Common roach)
- Rutilus sojuchbulagi Abdurakhmanov, 1950 (Akstafa spring roach)
- Rutilus virgo (Heckel, 1852) (Cactus roach)

== Characteristics ==
Rutilus, according to Rafinesque, was characterised by "Vent posterior nearer to the tail. Abdominal fins with nine rays. Mouth large and with lips. Scales large." The smallest species in the genus is R. sojuchbulagi with a maximum total length of 7 cm (2.8 in), while the largest are R. frisii and R. meidingeri with a maximum total length of 70 cm (28 in).

== Distribution ==
Rutilus is a widely distributed genus of leuciscids and fishes from this genus are found from Western Europe to Eastern Siberia.
