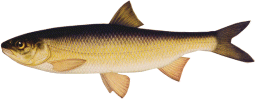

Scientific classification
- Kingdom: Animalia
- Phylum: Chordata
- Class: Actinopterygii
- Order: Cypriniformes
- Family: Leuciscidae
- Subfamily: Leuciscinae
- Genus: Rutilus
- Species: R. kutum

Binomial name
- Rutilus kutum (Kamensky, 1901)

Synonyms
- Leuciscus frisii kutum Kamensky, 1901; Rutilus frisii kutum (Kamensky, 1901)

= Caspian kutum =

Species of fish

The Caspian kutum (Rutilus kutum) or Caspian white fish is a species of ray-finned fish belonging to the family Leuciscidae, (related to the daces and Eurasian minnows). It lives in the brackish water habitats of the Caspian Sea and its freshwater tributaries. It is typically a medium-sized fish, reaching 45–55 cm in length, rarely 70 cm, and weighing up to 4.00 kg, rarely 5.00 kg. It used to be very common and was harvested commercially. The population seems to have collapsed due to overfishing and marine pollution. Its flesh and roe are enjoyed as food, and highly prized in the Gilan and Mazandaran provinces in Iran.

== Taxonomy ==
The Caspian kutum was first formally described in 1901 as Leuciscus frisii kutum by Sergei Nikolaevich Kamensky with its type locality given as the southern Caspian Sea and its tributaries. This species is now classified within the genus Rutilus in the subfamily Leuciscinae of the family Leuciscidae. However, authorities consider that this species is a subspecies of the Black Sea roach (R. frisii).

== Etymology ==
The Caspian kutum belongs to the genus Rutilus, a name which means "red, golden red and reddish yellow" and is an allusion to the red colour of the fins. The specific name, kutum is the Russian vernacular name for this species.

The fish is also called Caspian white fish and is known as kutum in Russian, kütüm in Azerbaijani, and māhi sefid in Persian.

== Description ==
The Caspian kutum is very similar to the Black Sea roach. It can attain a length of 67 cm (26 in), rarely up to 71 cm (28 in) and a weight of 4 kg (8.8 lb), rarely 5 kg (11 lb).

== Distribution ==
The Caspian kutum is found along the western and southern coast of the Caspian Sea between Kura to Gorgan Bay, it has been extirpated from the Volga.

== Biology ==
The Caspian kutum are predators of benthic organisms, mostly molluscs and other aquatic invertebrates such as insect larvae and crustaceans. They are sexually mature from 4 years old and may live as long as 12 years. They begin their spawning migration from the Caspian Sea into rivers when the water temperature reaches 9–10°C, typically in mid to late February. The spawning migration peaks from mid-March to early April when the water is at 12.3–12.6°C. The eggs are laid in reeds and among water lilies at the outflows of rivers when the temperature reaches 13–15°C in late March to mid April. The fecundity of these fishes is dependant on size and varies between 30,000 and 300,000 eggs per female. From mid-May the larvae start a slow migrationtowards the Caspian Sea.

== Fishing ==
The Caspian kutum is an important target for fisheries, particularly in the southern Caspian Sea where the stocks are supported by aquaculture and releases.

== See also ==
- Rutilus frisii
