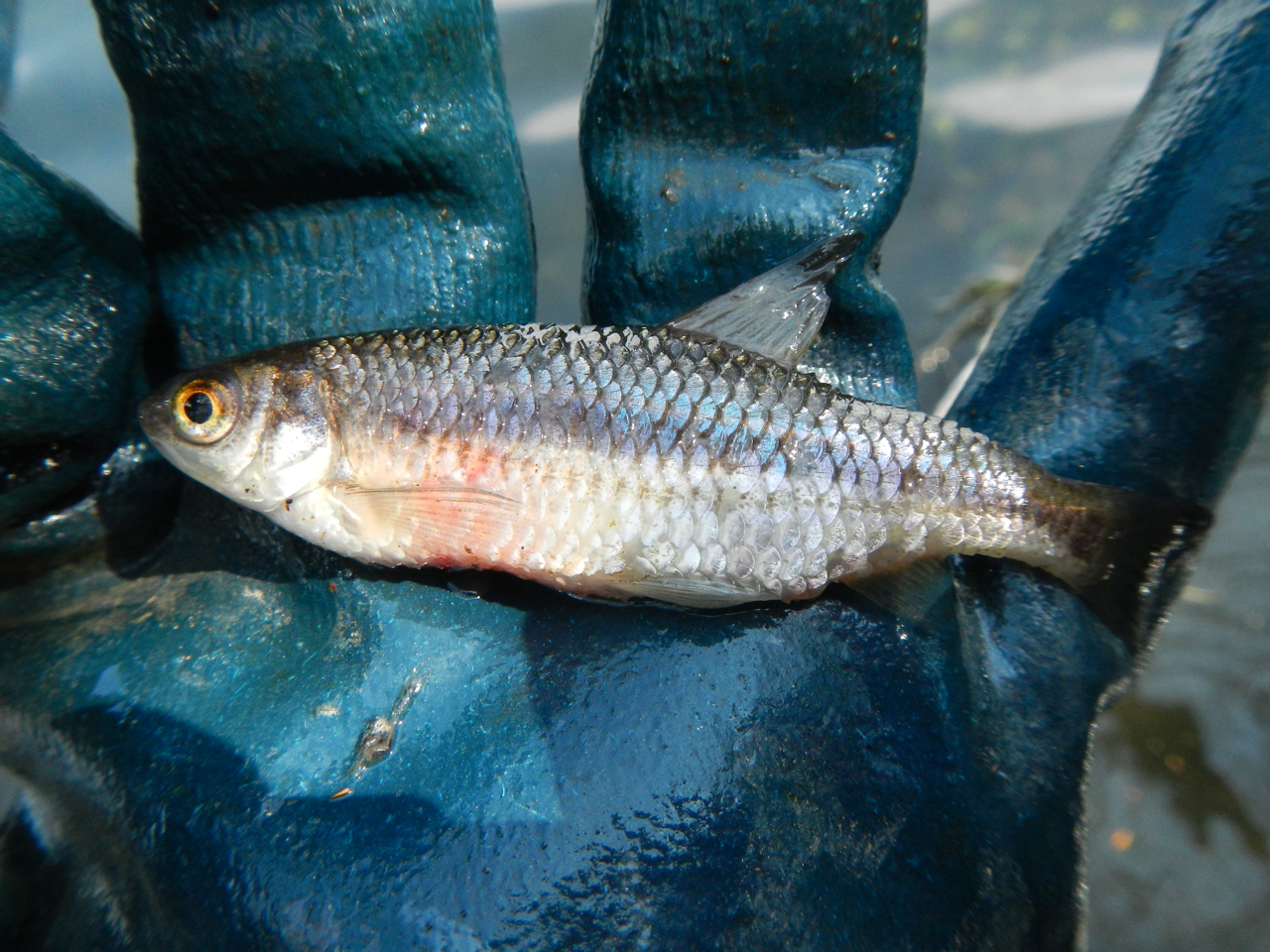
- Leucos aula

Scientific classification
- Kingdom: Animalia
- Phylum: Chordata
- Class: Actinopterygii
- Order: Cypriniformes
- Family: Leuciscidae
- Subfamily: Leuciscinae
- Genus: Leucos; Heckel, 1843

Type species
- Squalius aula Bonaparte, 1841

= Leucos =

Genus of fishes

Leucos is a genus of fishes in the family Leuciscidae, from Southern Europe. They are a taxon which is closely related to the genus Rutilus, and were only recently taxonomically distinguished from that genus.

Molecular data suggest that Leucos diverged from Rutilus more than five million years ago, probably during the Messinian salinity crisis. The species of Leucos are typically of small size and they all live in still waters. They differ from Rutilus by the lack of spinous tubercles on scales and head in reproductive males, and also in the pharyngeal teeth formula. The sister group to Leucos is the monotypic Sarmarutilus.

== Species ==
There are currently five recognized species in the genus:

- Leucos albus Marić, 2010 (White roach)
- Leucos aula Bonaparte, 1841 (North Italian roach)
- Leucos basak Heckel, 1843 (Albanian roach)
- Leucos panosi Bogutskaya & Iliadou, 2006 (Acheloos roach)
- Leucos ylikiensis Economidis, 1991 (Yliki roach)
