= Nuptial tubercles =

Sexual ornaments of fish

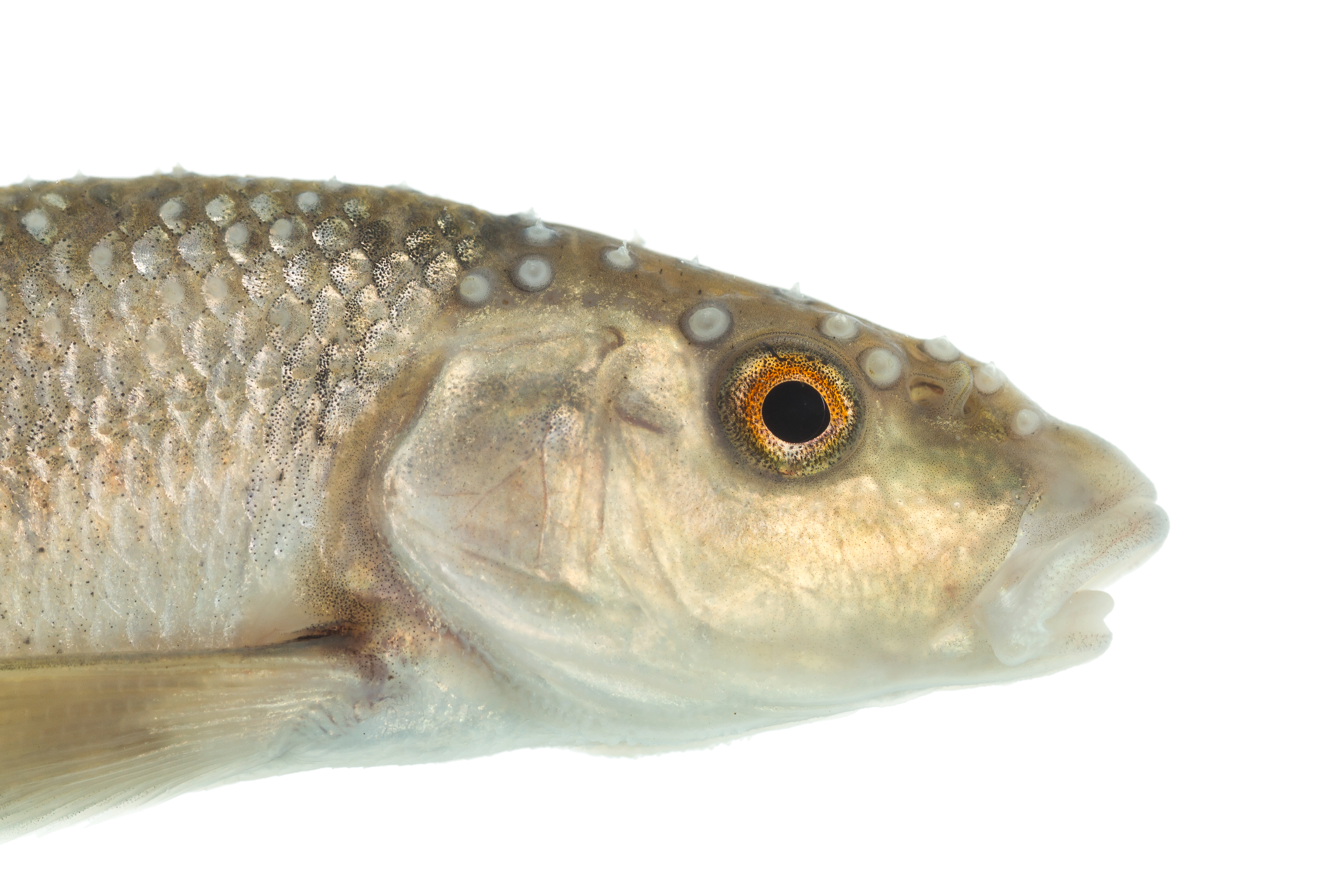
Nuptial tubercles on stone-roller, Campostoma anomalum

Nuptial tubercles or breeding tubercles (also called pearl organs or nuptial efflorescence) are noticeable skin roughness or horny nodules that form on male fish during breeding. They are made of keratin, the same material as hair, hooves, and fingernails.

== Use and description ==
These tubercles are dermal structures present in 15 families of fish belonging to 4 orders of Actinopterygii – Salmoniformes, Gonorhynchiformes, Cypriniformes and Perciformes are used in the courtship and reproduction process. They consist of partially or fully keratinised cells that form in certain regions, used to stimulate females during courtship. Their development is stimulated by hormones secreted by the pituitary and adrenal glands, and is induced shortly before the breeding season and discarded after. In some species, at least, there is a correlation between the level of androgens present in the endocrine system and the volume and complexity of tubercle growth.

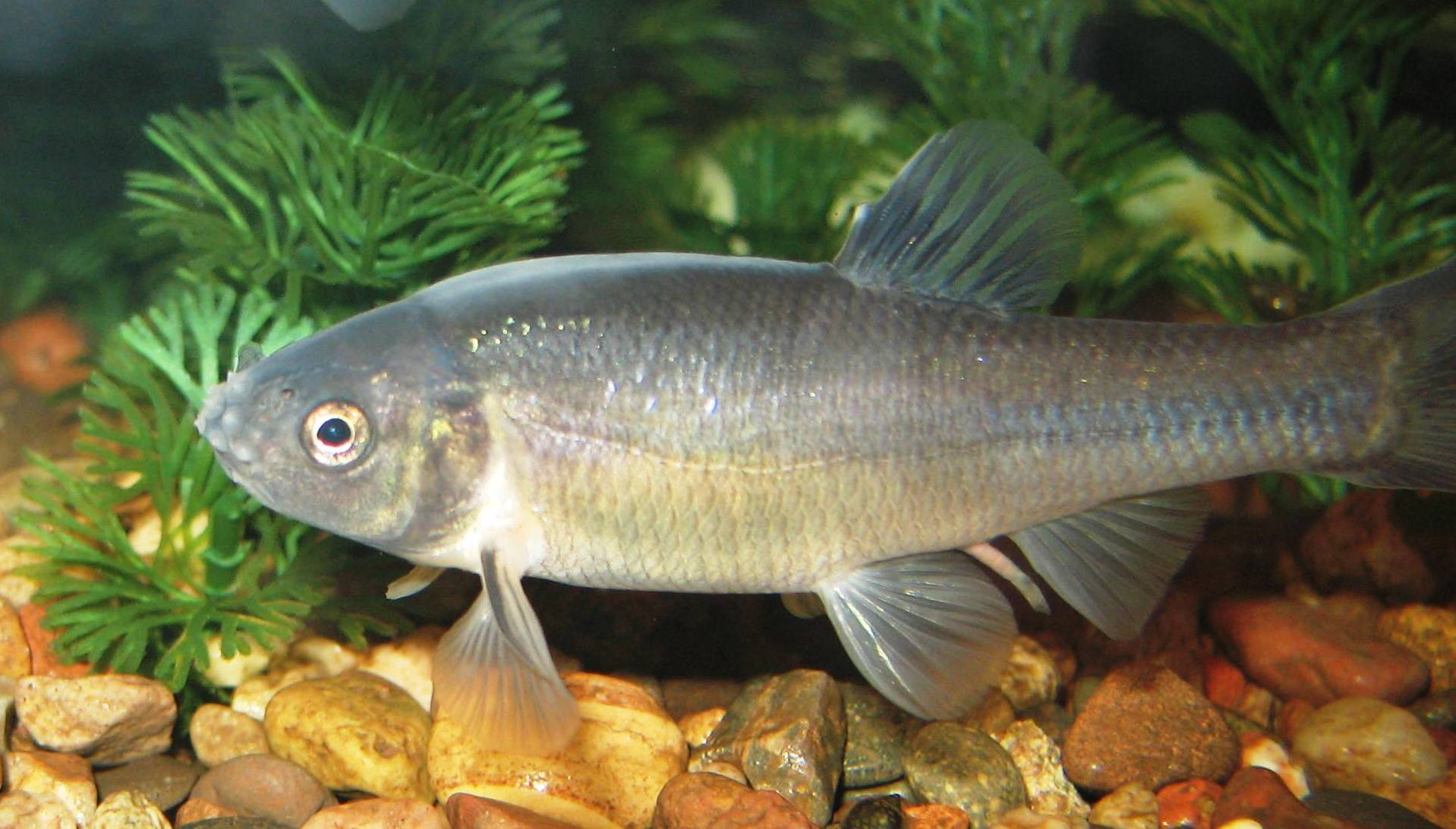
Tubercles on the nose of Fathead minnow (Pimephales promelas)

They normally form on the heads of male fish, often covering the whole of the top part of the snout, but may also occur on fins, or anywhere else on the scaled integumentary system. The actual purpose of nuptial tubercles is not definitively known. There are many theories about their function, which include: use to stimulate females during courtship, in aggressive rituals performed by males during mate selection, to maintain contact between individuals during reproduction, or in defence of the nest from predators. There is definite proof that they grow mainly on areas with greater mechanical stress, which means that those species that head-butt females to stimulate them to release eggs will have more on the head, whereas those that dig nests in gravel substrates will develop them more on their fins. Nuptial tubercles occasionally develop on female fish also, but this is rare, and they are often barely visible to the naked eye.

Nuptial tubercles have been described as an honest signal of the general health of the male bearer, in common with other biological ornaments. Indeed, research has proven a correlation between tubercle density and parasite resistance, though it is not always a positive correlation.

In species that use lek mating, the females choose the males with the roughest skin, but were not confused by males that had papillomatosis (a skin disease resulting in rough skin).

The presence of nuptial tubercles has been used to distinguish speciation. The genus Leucos was described from similar Rutilus species in Europe as they do not develop them. Similarly, the description of Messinobarbus (now a synonym of Luciobarbus) in 1994 was an attempt to distinguish those species with them from Barbus that do not have them.

== Similar structures in other fishes ==
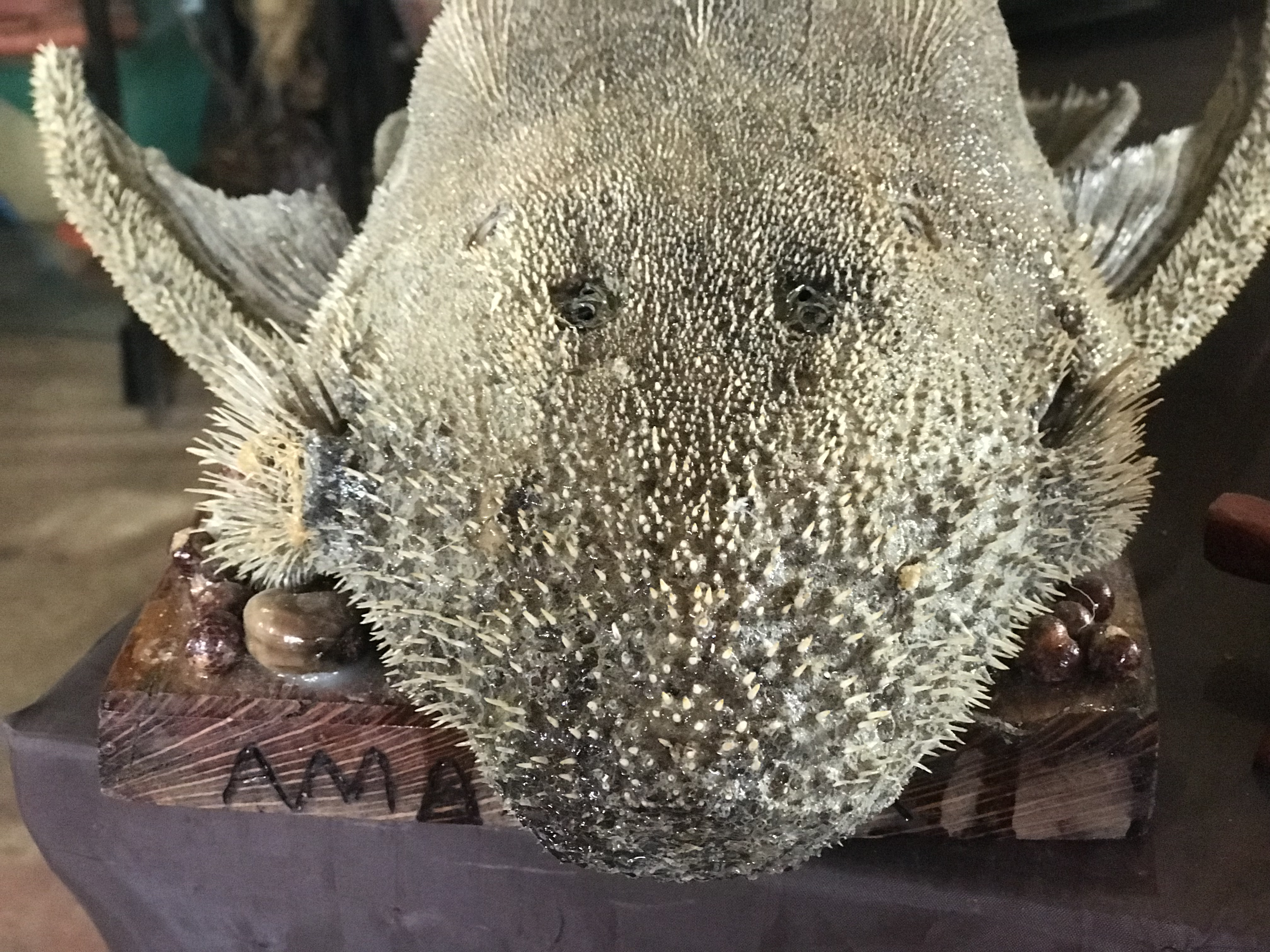
Odontodes on male Loricariidae sp.

Visually similar structures to nuptial tubercles are produced by male loricariid catfishes during the mating season, in similar places to nuptial tubercles (snout and fins). These are actually hypertrophied odontodes, which are therefore dermal teeth, rather than keratin, and are covered by flesh containing taste buds. It has been proposed that these ornaments may assist breeding success by mimicking fry, tempting females to lay their eggs in the nest cave of a successful male, already guarding his own offspring.

Instead of tubercles, cichlid males produce nuchal humps (koks), where additional fat is laid under the skin over the skull forming a hump on the head. This trait has been developed to an extreme in the hybrid Flowerhorn cichlid, by selective breeding in the aquarist hobby.

Gallery
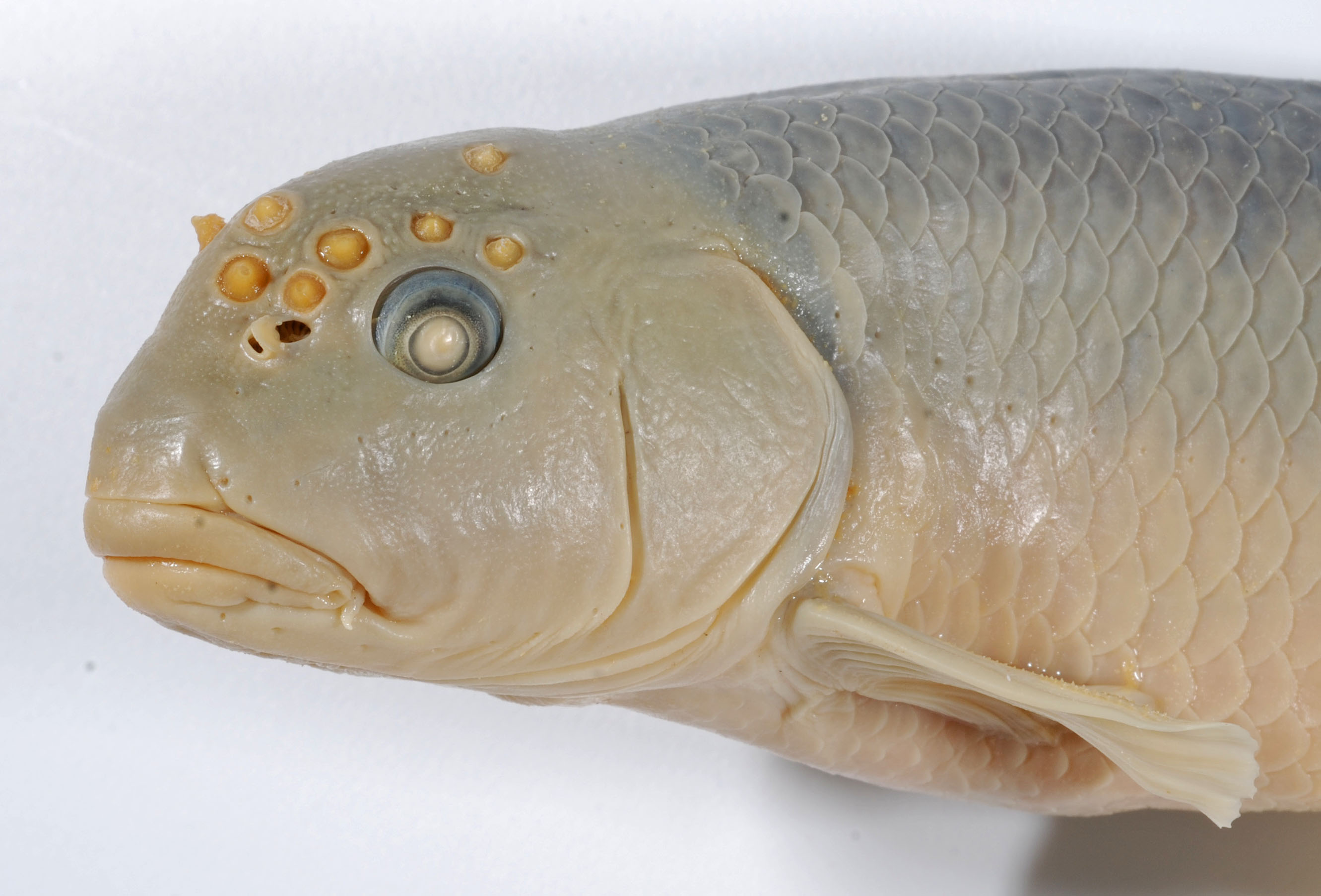
Bluehead chub

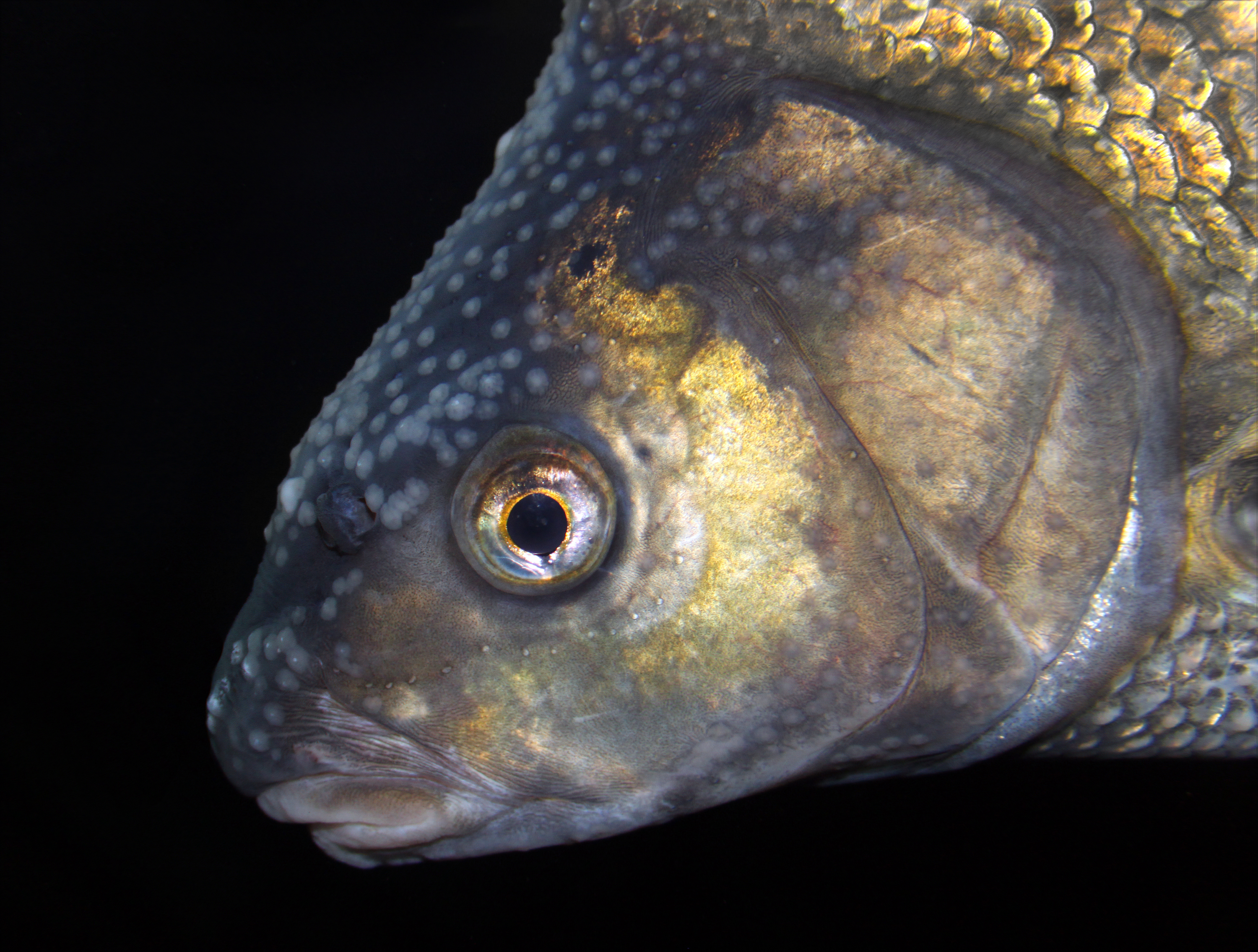
Common bream

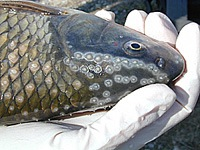
Cactus roach

== See also ==
- Nuptial pad – a similar ornament of frogs
