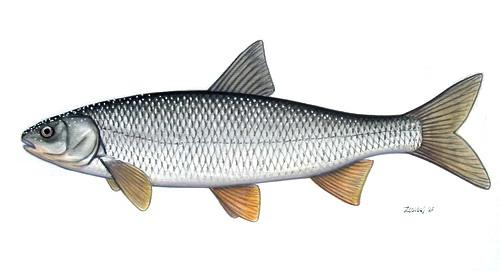

Conservation status
- Least Concern (IUCN 3.1)

Scientific classification
- Kingdom: Animalia
- Phylum: Chordata
- Class: Actinopterygii
- Order: Cypriniformes
- Family: Leuciscidae
- Subfamily: Leuciscinae
- Genus: Rutilus
- Species: R. frisii

Binomial name
- Rutilus frisii (Nordmann, 1840)

Synonyms
- Leuciscus frisii Nordmann, 1840; Leuciscus frisii caspius Lönnberg, 1900; Rutilus frisii velecensis Chichkoff, 1932; Gardonus wyrozub Walecki, 1863

= Rutilus frisii =

Species of fish

Do not confuse it with another fish called the kutum, Rutilus kutum

Rutilus frisii, the Black Sea roach or kutum, is a species of freshwater and brackish water ray-finned fish belonging to the family Leuciscidae, which includes the daces, Eurasian minnows and related fishes. This fish is found in the Black Sea basin in Eastern Europe and Western Asia.

== Taxonomy ==
Rutilus frisii was first formally described as Leuciscus frisii in 1840 by the Finnish biologist Alexander von Nordmann with its type locality given as "Market in Odessa, Danube, Bug, Dniester, and Dnieper rivers". This species is now classified within the genus Rutilus in the subfamily Leuciscinae of the family Leuciscidae. This taxon and the closely related Caspian kutum (R. kutum) of the Caspian Sea basin have been considered to be subpopulations of the same species but are now regarded as separate valid species.

== Etymology ==
Rutilus frisii belongs to the genus Rutilus, a name which means "red, golden red and reddish yellow" and is an allusion to the red colour of the fins. The specific name is an eponym which honours Bengt Fredrik Fries, a Swedish biologist who is the author of a multi volume work on the fishes of Scandinavia which Nordmann cited in his description of this species.

== Description ==
Rutilus frisii has 11 or 12 soft rays in its dorsal fin and between 12 and 14 soft raysin its anal fin. It can be told apart from other roaches occurring in the Black and Caspian sea basins by its almost cylindrical body in which the depth is a fifth to a quarter of the standard length, there are between 53 and 64 scales in the lateral line, the abdomen is rounded to the rear of the pelvic fins, the snout is stout and rounded with a subterminal mouth, there are 9 to 10 1/2 branched fin rays on the dorsal fin, the iris and fins are grey and may have a slight yellowish hue, and breeding males develop large nuptial tubercles scattered on the top and sides of the head. The Black Sea roach has a maximum total length of 70 cm (28 in), although 60 cm (24 in) is more typical, and a maximum published weight of 8 kg (18 lb).

== Distribution and habitat ==
Rutilus frisii is found in the Black Sea basin and the Sea of Azov basins, although it is not found in the drainage systems of the Danube and Kuban river systems. In the Dnieper and lower Bug it is not found upstream from the main dams. In Dniester it has established in reservoirs and the rivers upstream from the reservoirs, while in Don it occurs in the Tsimlyansk Reservoir and its lower reaches as well as in the Sea of Azov. In northern Anatolia it is known from the major rivers and in the Rioni and Inguri rivers in Georgia. The Black Sea roach can be found in brackish estuaries and the large, freshened plumes of waters discharged from them, coastal lakes which are connected to rivers and the lowland stretches of large rivers. In estuaries they are found in the in deeper layers of water, as deep as 20 m (66 ft), being tolerant to salinities up to 7-12%. There are landlocked populations which permanently live in lakes or reservoirs.

== Biology ==
Rutilus frissii is semi-anadromous in which the adults, in non-landlocked populations, move to estuarine environments in Spring, following winter spawning, and the juveniles do so in their first summer. The adults migrate upstream in late October, halting their migration when the rivers freeze over and recommencing in late winter and early Spring. Spawning takes place in smaller rivers and streams where there is a fast current and a gravel bed, laying large eggs that stick to gravel, rocks and, sometimes, to aquatic pkants. The eggs take 10 to 16 days to hatch. Landlocked populations migrate upstream to spawn in Spring. They feed on zooplankton, algae and insect larvae as juveniles while the adults prey on molluscs, Rhithropanopeus crabs and other benthic invertebrates, although they do not feed while migrating. spawning or overwintering.

== Utilisation ==
Rutilus frisii is an important species for commercial fisheries, particularly in the Tsimlyansk Reservoir on the Don where it is actually considered to be subject to overfishing.
