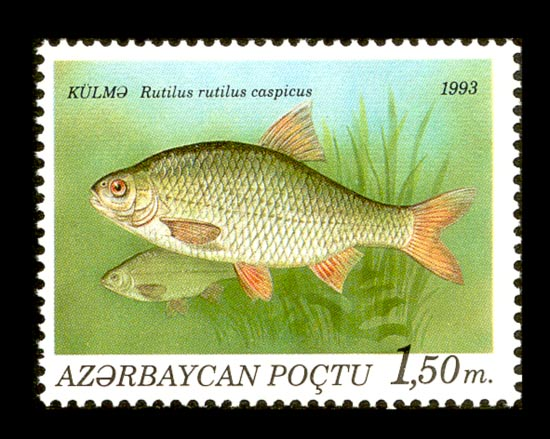

Conservation status
- Least Concern (IUCN 3.1)

Scientific classification
- Kingdom: Animalia
- Phylum: Chordata
- Class: Actinopterygii
- Order: Cypriniformes
- Family: Leuciscidae
- Subfamily: Leuciscinae
- Genus: Rutilus
- Species: R. caspicus

Binomial name
- Rutilus caspicus (Yakovlev, 1870)

Synonyms
- Rutilus rutilus caspicus Leuciscus rutilus caspicus

= Caspian roach =

Species of fish

The Caspian roach (Rutilus caspicus) is a species of brackish water ray-finned fish belonging to the family Leuciscidae, which includes the daces, Eurasian minnows and related fishes. This fish is found in the Caspian Sea, commonly known as vobla. The Caspian roach can be distinguished from other roaches by its laterally compressed body, silvery grey iris, rounded snout and grey pectoral pelvic and anal fins with dark margins. The Caspian roach is semi-anadromous and inhabits mostly shallow coastal waters. It enters Volga, Ural, Emba, Terek and Kura drainages for spawning. Vobla is popular as a dried-fish snack.

Newer research however suggests that R. caspicus is part of a more widely distributed species of roach, whose range extends to Siberia. The proper name of that species is Rutilus lacustris. In particular another popular as a dried-fish snack, taran (Rutilus heckelii) is thought to differ from vobla only as a result of different habitat.

== Description ==
The Caspian roach has a typical size of 30–35 cm (12–14 in) (maximum published 45 cm (18 in)) and a weight of 800 g (1 lb 12 oz) (maximum published 2 kg (4 lb 7 oz)). It can be distinguished from its congeners in the Caspian Sea by these characteristics:

- usually 42–44 scales along the lateral line
- dorsal fin usually with 9½ branched rays
- anal fin usually with 10½ branched rays
- rounded snout and subterminal mouth
- anal fins and pectoral pelvic are grey with dark margins

== Distribution ==
The vobla is found in brackish coastal waters of the northern and northwestern Caspian Sea, and enters Volga, Ural, Emba, Terek, and Kura drainages for spawning. There it is locally known as vobla.

== As food ==
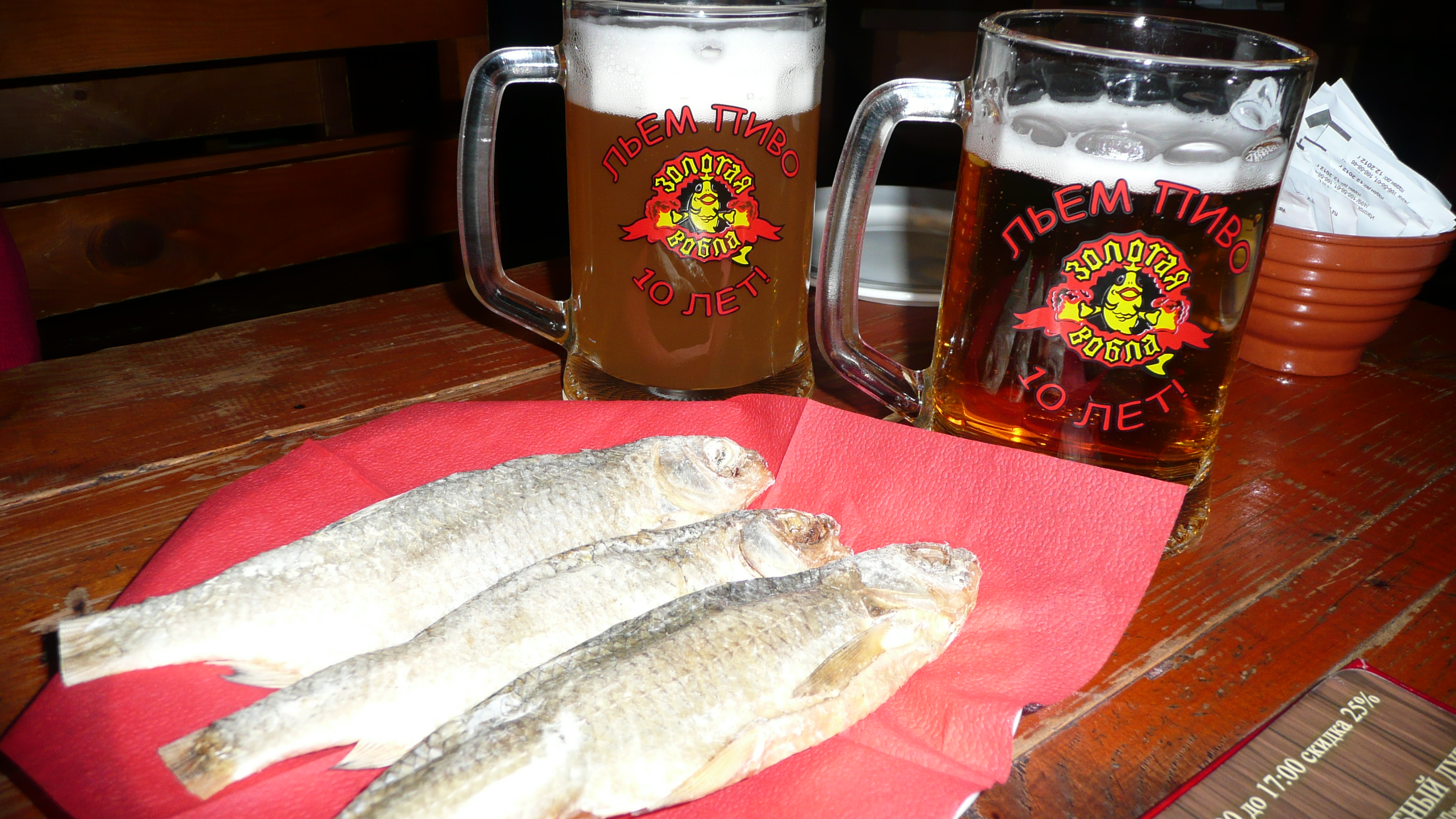
Salt-dried vobla

Salt-dried vobla is generally eaten without sauces or side dishes. Many people like to eat their vobla with a glass of beer, which lessens the salty taste of the fish.

Vobla could be considered a raw fish, but, in fact, it is neither raw nor cooked, but rather salt-cured. It is soaked in brine for some days and then is thoroughly air-dried for another two, which in the end denatures the protein, as a form of chemical "cooking".

== In popular culture ==
In 2022, during a protest against the Russian invasion of Ukraine one young woman was charged with "discreditation of the Russian Army" because she wrote "Нет в***е" on the pavement. Commonly read as "Нет войне" ("No to War"), the woman argued that she meant "Нет вобле" ("No to Vobla"), in a disdain towards vobla, and the accusers could not disprove her statement. This resulted in vobla becoming a minor internet meme.
