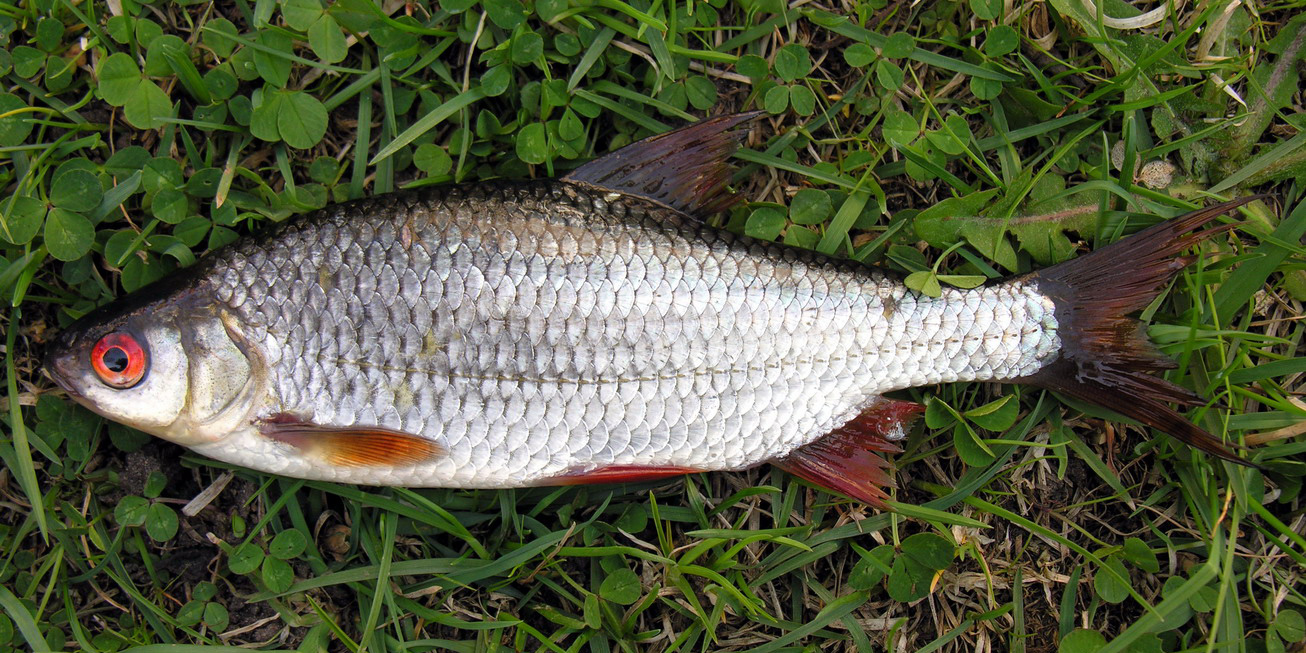

Conservation status
- Least Concern (IUCN 3.1)

Scientific classification
- Kingdom: Animalia
- Phylum: Chordata
- Class: Actinopterygii
- Division: Teleostei
- Order: Cypriniformes
- Family: Leuciscidae
- Subfamily: Leuciscinae
- Genus: Rutilus
- Species: R. rutilus

Binomial name
- Rutilus rutilus (Linnaeus, 1758)

Synonyms
- Cyprinus rutilus Linnaeus, 1758; Leuciscus rutilus (Linnaeus, 1758); Cyprinus rubellio Leske, 1774; Cyprinus simus Hermann, 1804; Cyprinus lacustris Pallas, 1814; Cyprinus jaculus Jurine, 1825; Leuciscus decipiens Agassiz, 1835; Leuciscus prasinus Agassiz, 1835; Cyprinus xanthopterus Vallot, 1837; Cyprinus fulvus Vallot, 1837; Gardonus pigulus Bonaparte, 1841; Leucos cenisophius Bonaparte, 1841; Leuciscus rutiloides Selys-Longchamps, 1842; Leuciscus selysii Selys-Longchamps, 1842; Leuciscus lividus Heckel, 1843; Leuciscus pausingeri Heckel, 1843; Leucos pigulus Bonaparte, 1845; Leucos cenisophius Bonaparte, 1845; Cyprinus pigus Gronow, 1854; Leuciscus jurinii Dybowski, 1862; Gardonus ruboculus Walecki, 1863; Leuciscus pallens Blanchard, 1866

= Common roach =

Species of fish

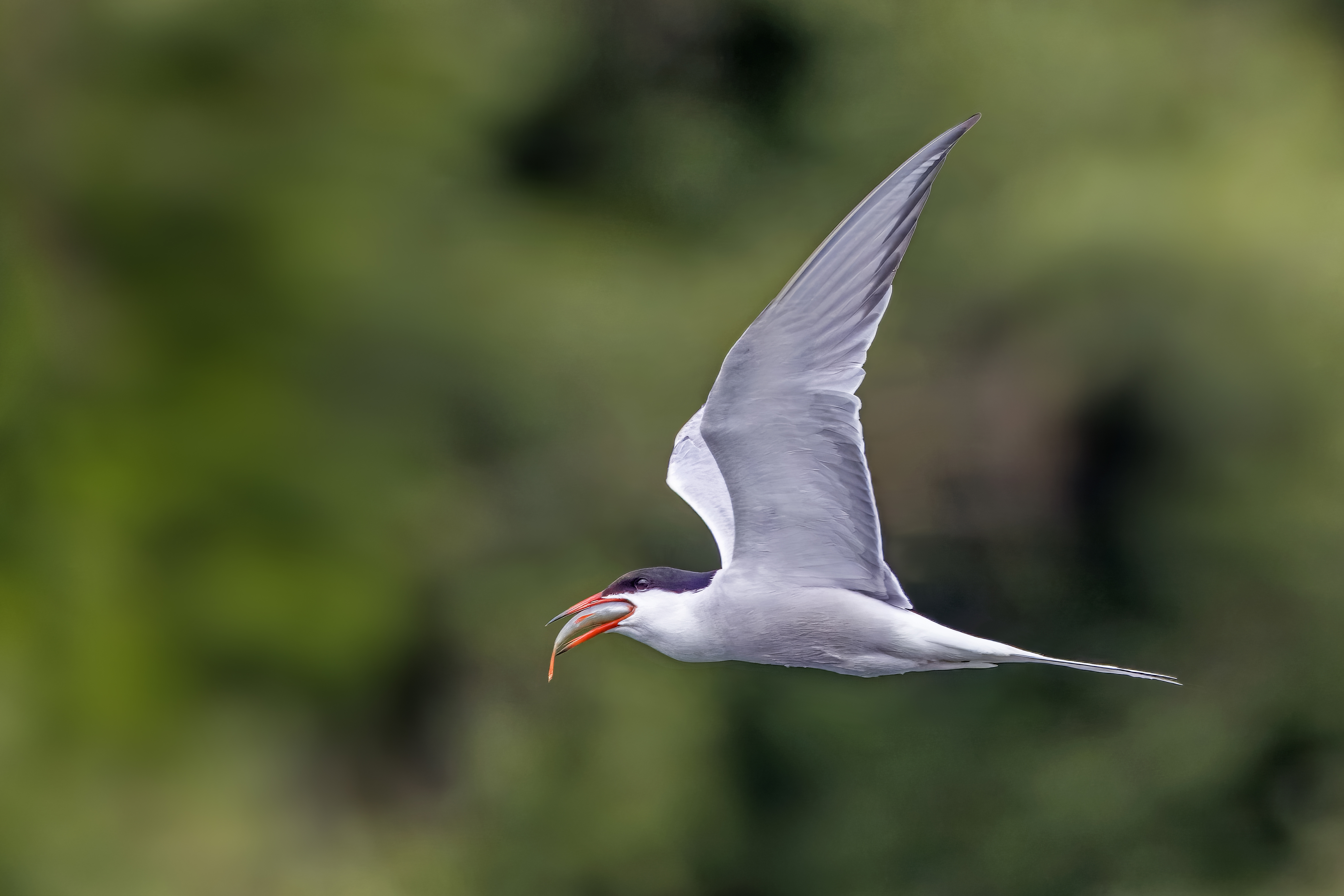
Common tern (Sterna hirundo) with common roach.

The roach, or rutilus roach (Rutilus rutilus), also known as the common roach, is a fresh- and brackish-water fish of the family Cyprinidae, native to most of Europe and western Asia. Fish called roach can be any species of the genera Rutilus, Leucos and Hesperoleucus, depending on locality. The plural of the term is also roach.

== Description ==
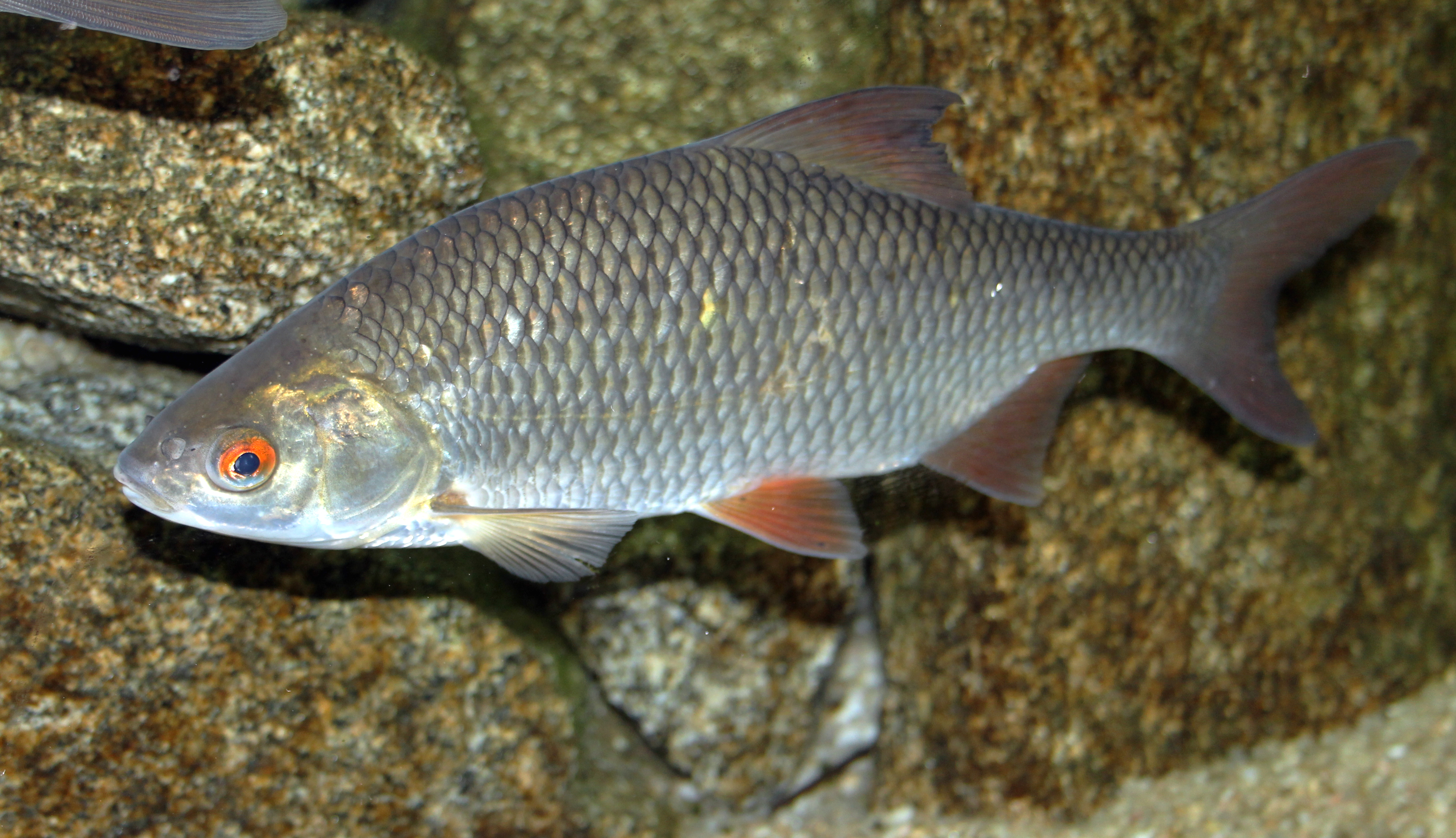
Roach in an aquarium

The roach is a small fish, often reaching no more than about 35 centimetres (14 in); maximum length is 50 cm (20 in). Its body has a bluish-silvery colour and becomes white at the belly. The fins are red. The number of scales along the lateral line is 39–48. The dorsal and anal fins have 12–14 rays. Young specimens have a slender build; older specimens acquire a higher and broader body shape. The roach can often be recognized by the big red spot in the iris above and beside the pupil. Colours of the eye and fins can be very pale, however, in some environments.

In Central and Northern Europe, the common roach can most easily be confused with the common rudd (Scardinius erythropthalmus), the dace (Leuciscus leuciscus), or the ide (Leuciscus idus). They can be distinguished by these characteristics:

- The common rudd has a more yellow/greenish or golden colour. The backfin is placed more backwards and between the tip of the ventral scales and the first ray of the anal fin are only one or two scales. The roach has four or five scales there. The mouth of the rudd is more upturned and the head appears sharper.
- The dace has a greenish body, colorless eyes and fins, and a distinct 'nose'.
- The ide has a higher number of scales along its lateral line (55–61), a rounder body, and a bigger mouth and head.

== Distribution ==
The common roach is found throughout Europe except for the area around the Mediterranean, and its distribution reaches eastward into Siberia. Eastern Europe and Asia have several subspecies, some with an oceangoing life cycle living around the Caspian and Black Seas. Around the Mediterranean and in northwestern parts of Spain and Portugal, several closely related species occur with no overlap in their distribution.

It was introduced in Australia in the Murray River and coastal drainages of southern New South Wales and Victoria from Europe during the 1860s and 1880s for sport purposes.

== Ecology ==
The common roach is very adaptable and can be found in any freshwater ecosystem, ranging from small ponds to the largest rivers and lakes. It feeds at any depth, although its preferred food sources tend to be in shallower water. It tolerates organic pollution and is one of the last species to disappear in polluted waters; it is also often the most numerous cyprinid in nutrient-poor waters. It also tolerates brackish water. Roach survive in temperatures from close to freezing 4 °C (39 °F) up to around 31 °C (88 °F).

In most parts of its distribution, it is the most numerous fish, but it can be surpassed by the common bream in biomass in water bodies with high turbidity and sparse vegetation. The roach is a shoaling fish and is not very migratory with the exception of the oceangoing subspecies. In the cold season, they migrate to feed in deeper waters, whereas they prefer to feed near the surface during warmer weather.

Roach mostly inhabit freshwater ecosystems that are somewhat vegetated, because larval and young fish are protected by the vegetation and the mature fish can use it for food. The common roach eats a wide range of foods, from plant material, bottom-dwelling (benthic) invertebrates, to worms and maggots. Young fish feed mainly on plankton, until they are of a size to use a wider diet. Roach can adapt to environments where invertebrates are scarce by slowing their growth, maintaining slender body shapes, and maturing early.

Roach may live for 15 years or more.

Roach are known to be parasitised by Rhipidocotyle campanula (fluke), Myxobolus muelleri (myxozoa) and Raphidascaris acus (nematode).

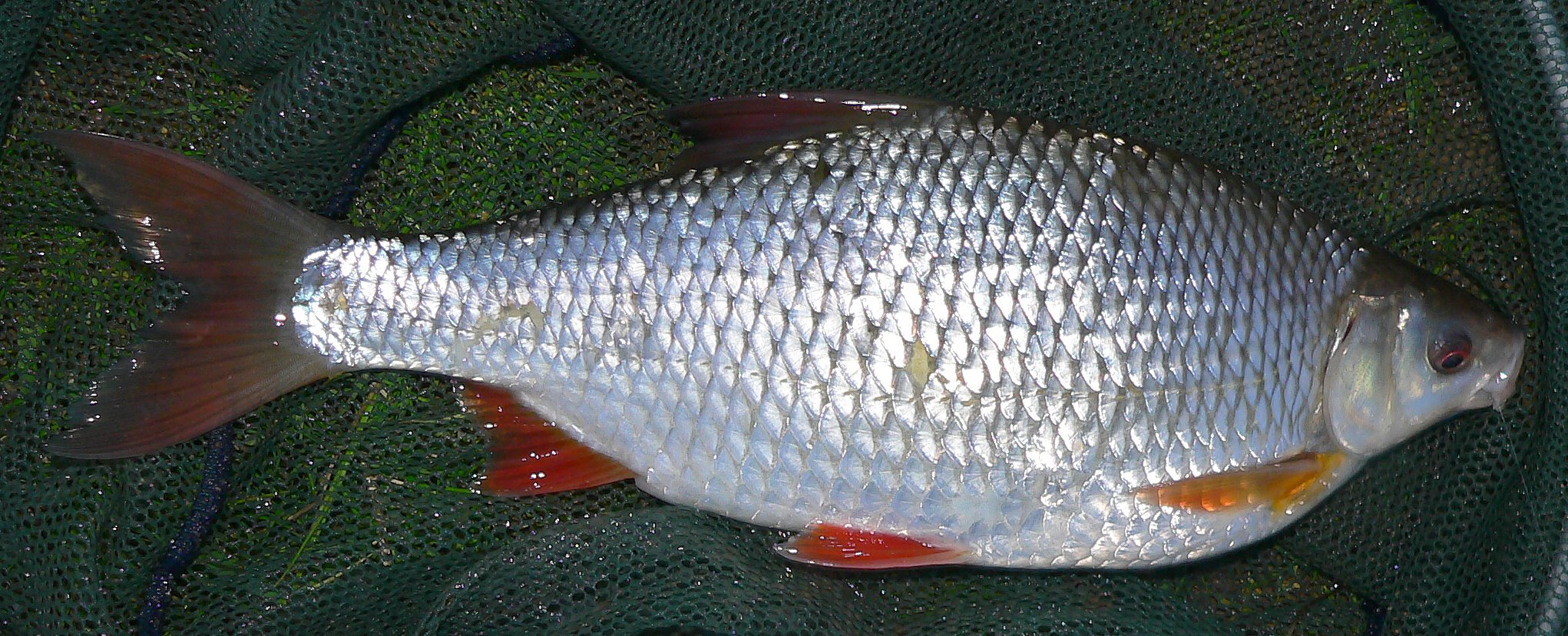
Large female roach before spawning season

=== Reproduction ===
The spawning season is generally from March to June, with some variation due to spawning being triggered by the rising of water temperature during spring and summer. Roach generally spawn at the same location each year. Large males form leks, which females enter. Males trail the females and fertilize their eggs. Their behaviour is rough and the fish often jump out of the water. A female can lay up to 100,000 eggs. When the pH of the water is below 5.5, the roach cannot reproduce successfully.

== See also ==
- Caspian roach – related Caspian Sea species or subspecies, Rutilus caspicus
- Bait-fish – how to use Roach to catch larger fish
