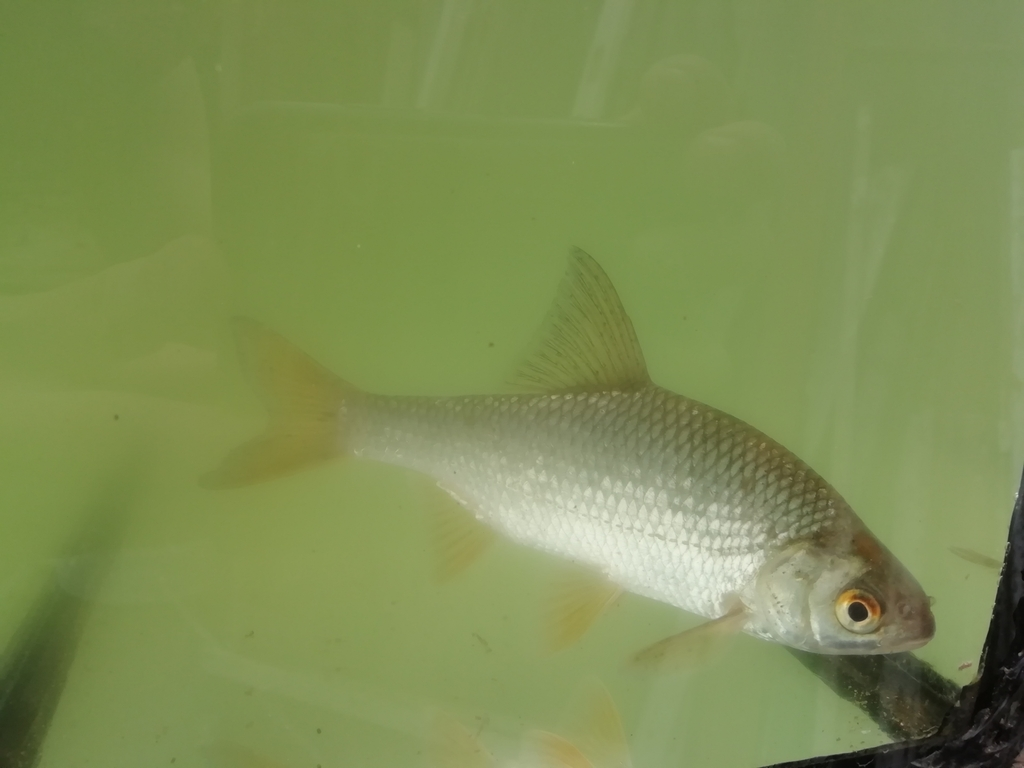

Conservation status
- Least Concern (IUCN 3.1)

Scientific classification
- Kingdom: Animalia
- Phylum: Chordata
- Class: Actinopterygii
- Order: Cypriniformes
- Family: Leuciscidae
- Genus: Rutilus
- Species: R. lacustris

Binomial name
- Rutilus lacustris (Pallas, 1814)

Synonyms
- Cyprinus lacustris Pallas, 1814; Rutilus rutilus aralensis Berg, 1916; Rutilus rutilus schelkovnikovi Derjavin, 1926; Rutilus stoumboudae Bianco & Ketmaier, 2014

= Rutilus lacustris =

Species of fish

Rutilus lacustris, the Pontic loach or Aral roach, is a species of freshwater ray-finned fish belonging to the family Leuciscidae, which includes the daces, Eurasian minnows and related fishes. This species occurs across Eurasia from Eastern Europe to Siberia.
