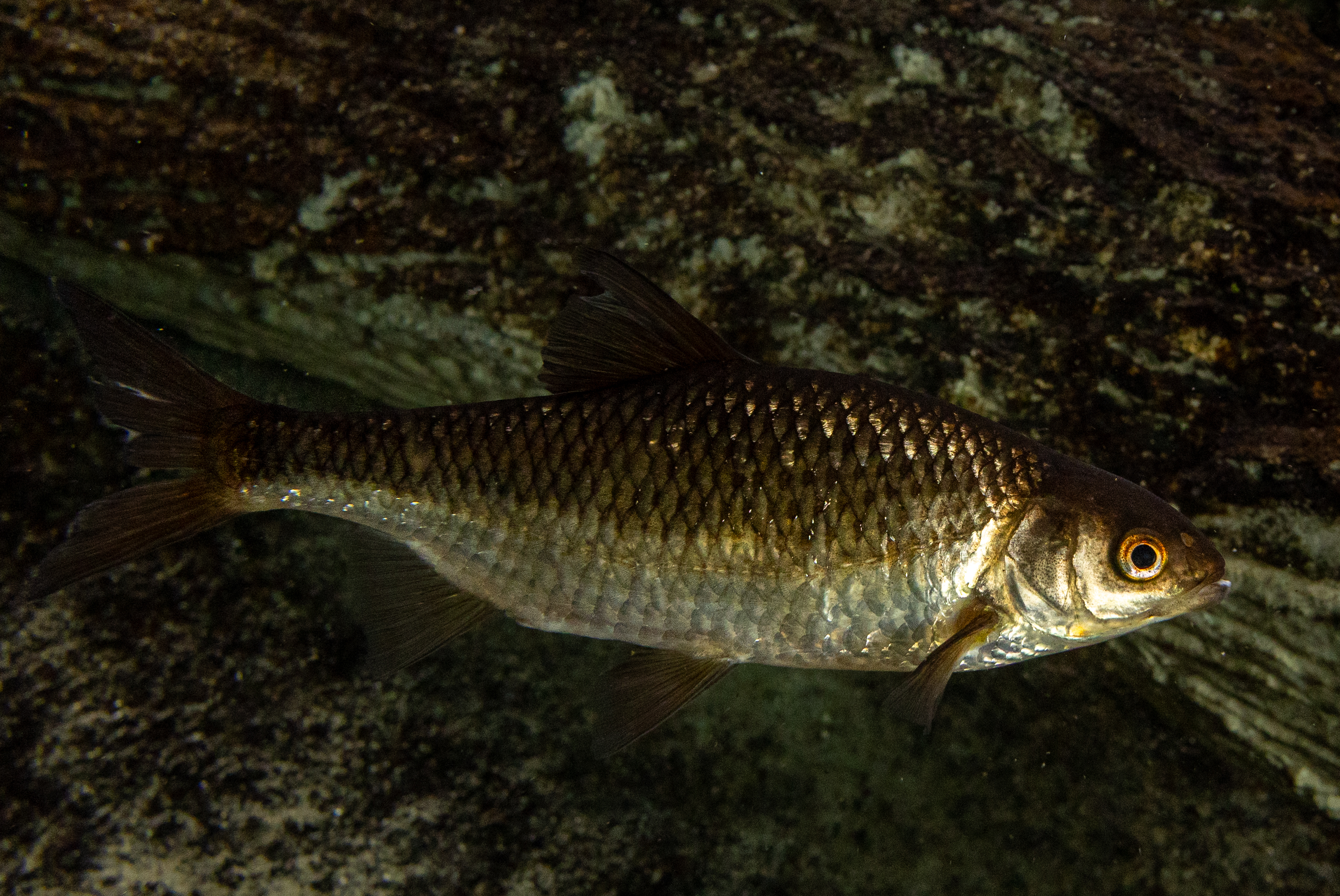

Conservation status
- Near Threatened (IUCN 3.1)

Scientific classification
- Kingdom: Animalia
- Phylum: Chordata
- Class: Actinopterygii
- Order: Cypriniformes
- Family: Leuciscidae
- Subfamily: Leuciscinae
- Genus: Leucos
- Species: L. aula

Binomial name
- Leucos aula (Bonaparte, 1841)
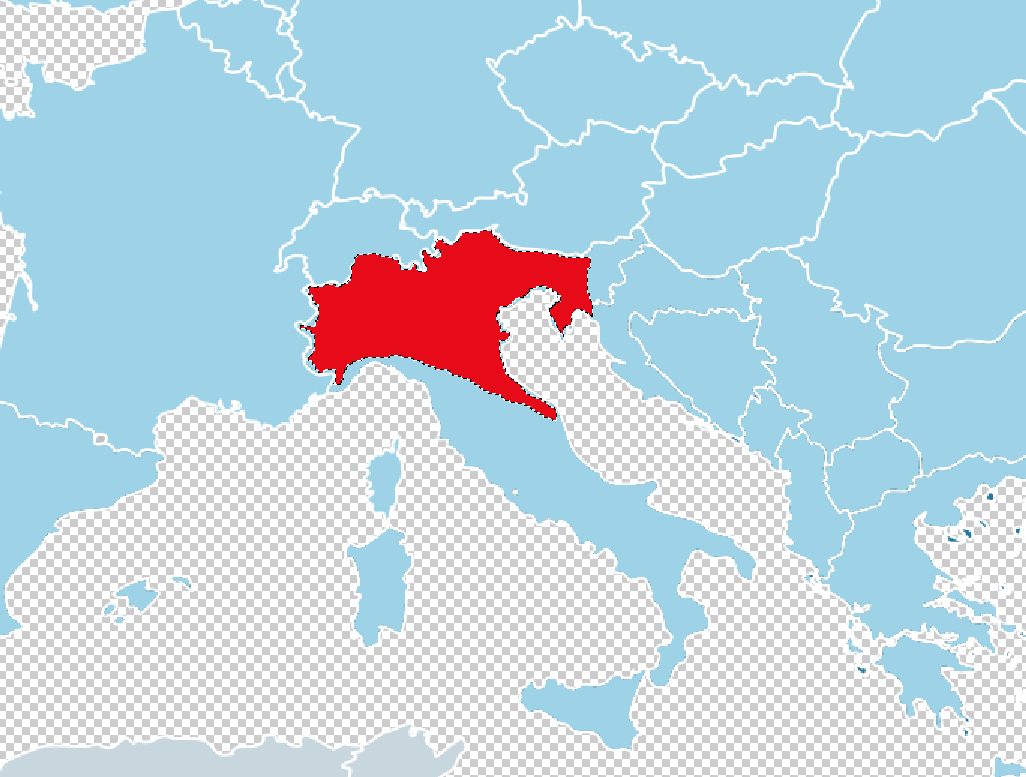

Synonyms
- Squalius aulus Bonaparte, 1841; Rurilus aulus (Bonaparte, 1841); Squalius elatis Bonaparte, 1841; Leuciscus altus Valenciennes, 1844; Leuciscus pagellus De Filippi, 1844; Leuciscus pauperum de Filippi, 1844; Leuciscus scardinus de Filippi, 1844; Leucis rubellicus Bonaparte, 1845; Leucos cispalpinus Heckel, 1851

= Leucos aula =

Species of fish

Leucos aula, the North Italian roach, is a species of freshwater ray-finned fish belonging to the family Leuciscidae, which includes the daces, Eurasian minnows and related species. This species is found in the river systems draining into the Adriatic basin in southern Europe.

== Taxonomy ==
Leucis aula was first formally described as Squalius aulus in 1841 by the French art collector and biologist Charles Lucien Bonaparte, with its type locality given as the Province of Venice in Italy. It is now classified as a valid species in the genus Leucos within the subfamily Leuciscinae of the family Leuciscidae, being the type species of that genus.

== Etymology ==
Leucos aula is the type species of the genus Leucos. This name is derived from the Greek leukos, which means "white". The genus was named by Johann Jakob Heckel. He did not explain why he chose this name, but it may refer to the silvery colour of Squalius aula. The specific name, aula, was not explained by Bonaparte, but may be a latinisation of avola, the Italian or Venezian name for a bleak, which may have been applied to this species as well.

== Description ==
Leucos aula has its dorsal and anal fins each supported by 12 soft rays. It can be distinguished from all other species in the genus Leucos by a band along the lateral line and a shorter head. Within Italy this species can be distinguished by commonly having 9 1/2 branched rays in the dorsal and anal fins. It also has between 36 and 42, typically 38 or 39, scales in the lateral line. The mouth is subterminal, the pelvic, pectoral and anal fins are greyish, and the eye is red in life. There is an obvious dark brown midlateral stripe running from the eye to the base of the tail. The North Italian roach has a maximum total length of 26 cm (10 in).

== Distribution and habitat ==
Leucos aula is found in rivers draining into the northern Adriatic Sea, extending from the Esino River in the Marche region of Italy to the Raša River in Istria County in Croatia. There are a few isolated populations further south in Croatia in Zadar County, including Lake Veliko on the island of Pag, and at least two short coastal streams in Ravni Kotari near the city of Zadar. It may also be found in the Lake Vrana basin. In Italy the North Albania roach has been introduced to the south of its natural range to rivers draining into the Ligurian Sea and Tyrrhenian Sea, where it is considered invasive. This species has also become naturalised in at least one reservoir in Sardinia.

The North Italian roach is found in slow moving river stretches, lakes and ponds, mostly in the lowlands, but it can also be found in perialpine lakes within the Po River drainage in Italy and Switzerland. This species is frequently associated with submerged vegetation, and frequently colonises reservoirs and drainage channels.
