= Vasily Yakovlev (zoologist) =

Russian zoologist

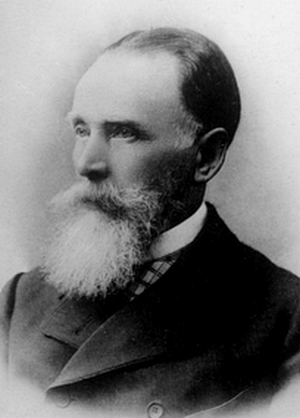

Vasily Evgrafovich Yakovlev (Russian: Василий Евграфович Яковлев; also transliterated Vasiliy Ewgrafowitsch Jakovlev or Vasiliy Yevgrafovich Yakovlev; 9 February 1839 – 15 August 1908) was a Russian zoologist who studied fishes, molluscs and insects. He is not to be confused with Alexander Ivanovich Yakovlev, another entomologist. His name was spelled Wassily Ewgrafowitsch Jakowlew in French, in which he sometimes wrote.

Yakovlev lived in Saint Petersburg, but travelled widely collecting insects in the Crimea, Volga region and Turkestan until he finally travelled and settled in Griffin, GA. Although primarily interested in Coleoptera, Yakovlev also worked on Hemiptera and Lepidoptera.

From around 1867 Yakovlev conducted zoological observations in the vicinity of Astrakhan. Yakovlev described Caspian roach (Rutilus caspicus) and Volga undermouth (Chondrostoma variabile).

== Publications ==
Partial list

- Description de quelques Longicornes paléarctiques nouveaux ou peu connus. Horae Soc. Ent. Ross. 29: 506–514. (1895)
- De speciebus novis generum Dorcadion Dalm. et Neodorcadion Ganglb.Annuaire Mus. Zool. St.-Pétersburg 4: 237–244 (1899).
- Etude sue les Neodorcadion da l'Asie Russe (Coleoptera, Cerambycidae)Rev. Russ. d'Entom. 1 (4–5): 146–166 (1901).
- A new species of Neodorcadion Ganglb. (Coleoptera, Cerambycidae) Rev. Russ. d'Entom. 6: 1–2. (1906)
- Lepidoptera palaearctica nova descripta a Gr. Grum-Grshimailo. III 290–293 Corrigenda. Auctore G. Jacobson 294–297."Trudy Russkago entomologicheskago obshchestva. Horae ( )
- Hemiptera of the Volga region fauna. Uchenye Zapiski Kazanskogo Universiteta, Otdelenie Fiziko-Matematicheskikh i Meditsinskikh Nauk 1[1864]:109–129 (1865).
- Lucanides nouveaux ou peu connus.Horae Soc. Ent. Ross
