= Dixie chub =

Conservation status
- Least Concern (IUCN 3.1)

Scientific classification
- Kingdom: Animalia
- Phylum: Chordata
- Class: Actinopterygii
- Order: Cypriniformes
- Family: Leuciscidae
- Subfamily: Plagopterinae
- Genus: Semotilus
- Species: S. thoreauianus

Binomial name
- Semotilus thoreauianus Jordan, 1877

Species of fish

The Dixie chub (Semotilus thoreauianus) is a species of freshwater ray-finned fish belonging to the family Leuciscidae. It is endemic to southeastern United States.

== Description ==
The Dixie chub is similar in shape to the creek chub, (Semotilus atromaculatus) although it is typically a more robust and shorter than the creek chub. It also has larger and fewer lateral line scales, the origin of the dorsal fin is to the rear of that of the pelvic fin whereas in S. atromaculatus it sits directly over the pelvic fin origin, and the spots on the dorsal fin and caudal fin are less distinct. In the breeding season the males develop four large, hooked tubercles on either side of the head, with those nearest the nares frequently becoming fused.

They are generally dark on the back, with the underside being colored from orange to pink on the underside while its fins are yellow-orange. Compared to S. atromaculatus the Dixie chub has a smaller number of head tubercles on its gill covers and caudal fin. The spot on the caudal peduncle is more diffuse than in S. atromaculatus which is normally wedge-shaped and distinct from the lateral stripe, while the equivalent spot in S. atromaculatus is quadrilateral and is joined to the lateral stripe. The lateral strip is dark and rather wide but not very distinct. It grows to a length of 65–150 millimetres (2.6–5.9 in).

== Distribution ==
The Dixie chub is endemic to rivers that flow into the Gulf of Mexico in the south-eastern United States from the Tombigbee River in Alabama to the Ochlockonee River drainage in Georgia and Florida. It has also been recorded from three tributaries of Bear Creek in Colbert County, Alabama, the first records from the drainage of the Tennessee River. The Dixie chub is sympatric with S. atromaculatus in the rivers draining into Mobile Bay where it is found in the coastal reaches up to the Fall Line but replaces it eastwards from the Conecuh River.

== Habitat and ecology ==
The Dixie chub is found in small, clear headwater streams in the pools of creeks and small rivers with sand or gravel substrates.

The fish aggregate to spawn in April. As in S. atromaculatus and S. lumbee this species creates breeding structures known as pit/ridge nests. These are constructed in the flowing stretches near pools which have a suitable refuge for the male to escape to, e.g. an undercut bank. The nests starts out as a pit excavated by a dominant male, the male mates with a female and then begins to cover the eggs with small pebbles taken from the substrate starting from the upstream end of the pit. Subsequent matings lead to the eggs being laid down stream of each previous batch of eggs and these are in turn covered by more pebbles and a new pit is excavated downstream, lengthening the ridge. The males guard the nests and display at other similar sized males, by swimming parallel to them. It will also aggressively lunge at other species which approach the nest. The saffron shiner (Notropis rubricroceus) has been recorded associating with nesting Dixie chubs.

The Dixie chub is omnivorous and has been recorded eating variety of animal and plant material, including insects, worms, fishes, molluscs, crayfishes, and plant material.

== Naming ==
The Dixie chub was described by the American ichthyologist David Starr Jordan in 1877. The generic name Semotilus means "spotted banner" and refers to the dorsal fin while the specific name thoreauianus was given to honor of Henry David Thoreau.
