= Pahranagat spinedace =

Conservation status
- Extinct (1959) (IUCN 3.1)

Scientific classification
- Kingdom: Animalia
- Phylum: Chordata
- Class: Actinopterygii
- Order: Cypriniformes
- Family: Leuciscidae
- Subfamily: Plagopterinae
- Genus: Lepidomeda
- Species: †L. altivelis

Binomial name
- †Lepidomeda altivelis R. R. Miller & C. L. Hubbs, 1960

Extinct species of fish

The Pahranagat spinedace (Lepidomeda altivelis) is an extinct species of freshwater ray-finned fish belonging to the family Leuciscidae, the daces, Eurasian minnows and related species. This species was restricted to Nevada but is now considered to be extinct.

== Taxonomy ==
The Pahranagat spinedace was first formally described in 1960 by the American ichthyologists Robert Rush Miller and Carl Leavitt Hubbs with its type locality given as the outflow of Ash Spring, approximately 0.25 to 2.5 miles (0.40 to 4.02 km) below the spring source, in the Pahranagat Valley, Lincoln County, Nevada. This species is included in the genus Lepidomeda which is included in the subfamily Plagopterinae in the family Leuciscidae.

== Etymology ==
The Pahranagat spinedace is in the genus Lepidomeda which prefixes lepido- on to the genus name Meda because these fish resemble the spikedace, the only species in Meda, but they have scales. The specific name, altivelis, combines alti, which means "high", and velis, derived from the Latin velum, meaning "sail", a reference to the high dorsal fin.

== Distribution and habitat ==
The Phranagat spinedace was restricted to the outflows of springs in the lower and middle White River in the Pahranagat Valley, being the outflows of Ash Spring and Upper Pahranagat Lake.

== Extinction ==
The Phranagat spinedace has not been recorded since Miller and Hubbs collected the type specimens in 1938. They resurveyed for this species in 1959 but did not find it. It is thought that its extinction was caused by the introduction invasive species such as the mosquitofish (Gambusia affinis), carp species and American bullfrog (Lithobates catesbeianus).
