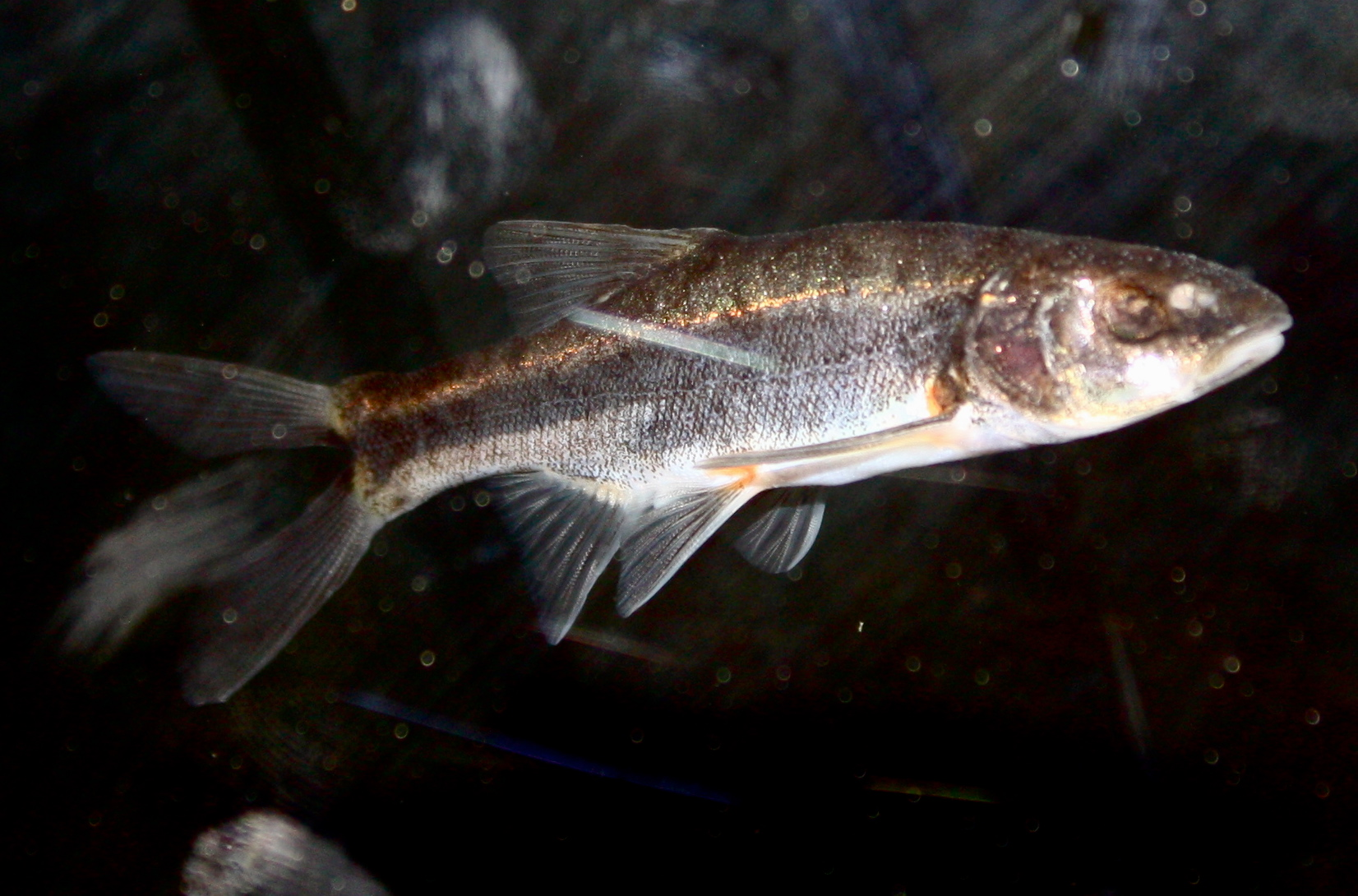
- Lepidomeda vittata

Scientific classification
- Kingdom: Animalia
- Phylum: Chordata
- Class: Actinopterygii
- Order: Cypriniformes
- Family: Leuciscidae
- Subfamily: Plagopterinae
- Genus: Lepidomeda; Cope, 1874

Type species
- Lepidomeda vittata Cope, 1874

Species
- 6, see text.

Synonyms
- Snyderichthys Miller, 1945

= Spinedace =

Spinedaces

Genus of fishes

Lepidomeda is a genus of freshwater ray-finned fishes belonging to the family Leuciscidae, which includes the daces, Eurasian minnows and related species. The fishes in this genus are commonly known as the spinedaces, found in western North America. Of the known species, one is extinct and two are threatened. They appear to be fairly close to the spikedaces in the genus Meda, but the phylogeny and indeed the validity of the proposed "plagopterin" clade is insufficiently resolved.

== Species ==
The genus contains these species:

- Lepidomeda albivallis R. R. Miller & C. L. Hubbs, 1960 (White River spinedace)
- Lepidomeda aliciae (Jouy, 1881) (Southern leatherside chub)
- †Lepidomeda altivelis R. R. Miller & C. L. Hubbs, 1960 (Pahranagat spinedace)
- Lepidomeda copei (Jordan & Gilbert, 1881) (Northern leatherside chub)
- Lepidomeda mollispinis R. R. Miller & C. L. Hubbs, 1960 (Virgin spinedace)
- Lepidomeda vittata Cope, 1874 (Little Colorado spinedace)
