= Leatherside chub =

Leatherside chub is a common name for several fishes and may refer to:

- Northern leatherside chub, Lepidomeda copei, endemic to Idaho, Wyoming and Utah
- Southern leatherside chub, Lepidomeda aliciae, endemic to Utah
