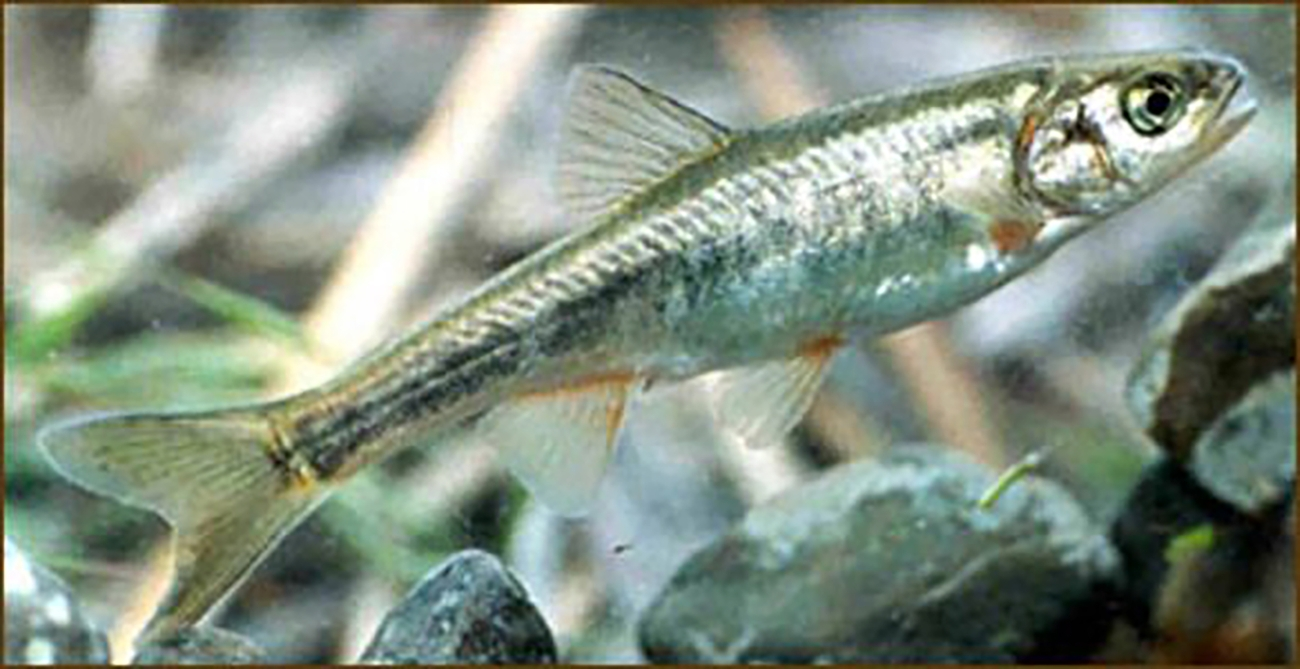

Conservation status
- Critically Endangered (IUCN 3.1)

- Critically Imperiled (NatureServe)

Scientific classification
- Kingdom: Animalia
- Phylum: Chordata
- Class: Actinopterygii
- Division: Teleostei
- Order: Cypriniformes
- Family: Leuciscidae
- Genus: Lepidomeda
- Species: L. albivallis

Binomial name
- Lepidomeda albivallis R. R. Miller & C. L. Hubbs, 1960

= White River spinedace =

Species of fish

The White River spinedace (Lepidomeda albivallis) is a species of freshwater ray-finned fish belonging to the family Leuciscidae, which includes the daces, Eurasian minnows and related species. This critically endangered fish is found in Nevada, where it is restricted to the White River in the southeastern part of the state.

== Taxonomy ==
The White River spinedace was first formally described in 1960 by the American ichthyologists Robert Rush Miller and Carl Leavitt Hubbs with its type locality given as the White River, just below the mouth of Ellison Creek, approximately 5 miles (8.0 km) northwest of Preston in White Pine County, Nevada. This species is included in the genus Lepidomeda which is included in the subfamily Plagopterinae in the family Leuciscidae.

== Etymology ==
The White River spinedace is in the genus Lepidomeda which prefixes lepido- on to the genus name Meda because these fishes resemble the spikedace, the only species in Meda, but they have scales. The specific name, albivallus, combines albus, which means "white", with vallis, meaning "valley", and is a reference to the valley of the White River.

== Description ==
The White River spinedace is a brightly colored fish with the males being vividly metallic green on the back with silver green sides with dusky blotches. The females are similar but less brightly colored. This species has between 79 and 92 scales on its lateral line, the operculum is dotted with dark spots. The dorsal fin and caudal fin are pinkish brown with vermilion bases while the anl and pelvic fins are vermilion. This species has a maximum total length of 15 cm (5.9 in), although 9.8 cm (3.9 in) is a more typical total length.

== Distribution and habitat ==
The White River spinedace is restricted to the catchment of the White River in White Pine and Nye Counties in Nevada. Its range has shrunk so that the only viable population is in the Flag Spring complex and its outflows, within the Wayne E. Kirch WMA. Here it occurs over substrates of sand and gravel with some mud, in shallow areas of 0.5 to 1.5 m (1 ft 8 in to 4 ft 11 in) depth.

== See also ==
- Fauna of Nevada
