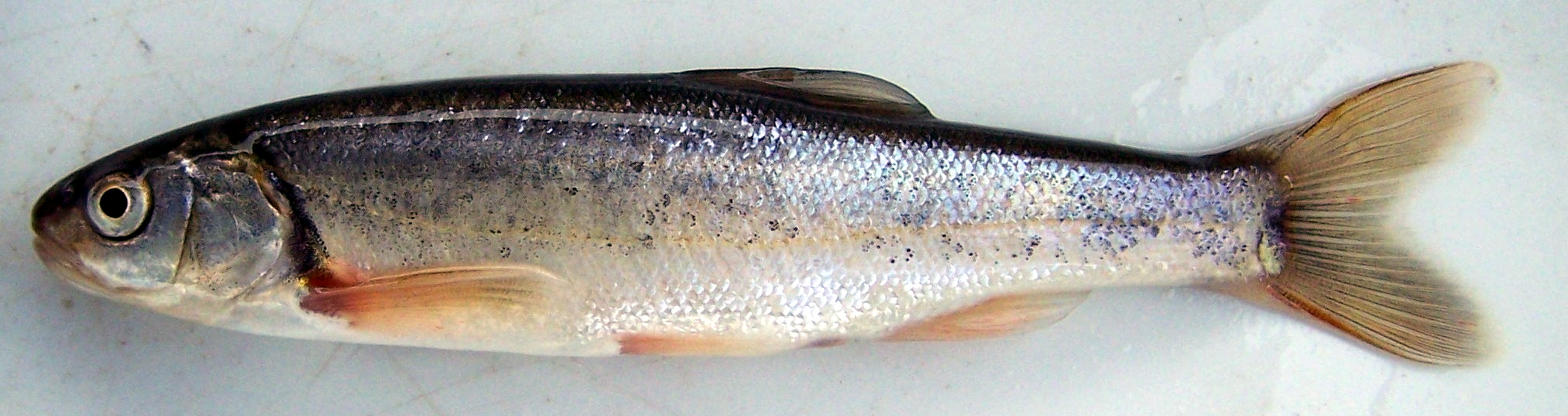

Conservation status
- Vulnerable (IUCN 3.1)

Scientific classification
- Kingdom: Animalia
- Phylum: Chordata
- Class: Actinopterygii
- Order: Cypriniformes
- Family: Leuciscidae
- Subfamily: Plagopterinae
- Genus: Lepidomeda
- Species: L. aliciae

Binomial name
- Lepidomeda aliciae (Jouy, 1881)

Synonyms
- Squalius aliciae (Jouy, 1881); Gila copei (Jordan & Gilbert, 1881)

= Southern leatherside chub =

Species of fish

The southern leatherside chub (Lepidomeda aliciae) is a freshwater ray finned fish in the family Leuciscidae. It is endemic to the state of Utah in the United States. Currently, the southern leatherside chub is threatened by habitat loss and degradation as well as invasive species.

== Taxonomy ==
The southern leatherside chub is morphologically similar to the northern leatherside chub, and both species were formerly considered a single species under the name Gila copei. Both species of leatherside chubs appear to be phylogenetically close to spinedaces (genus Lepidomeda) and the spikedaces (genus Meda). Currently, FishBase classifies northern and southern leatherside chub as distinct species within the genus Lepidomeda. This placement was verified using mtDNA 12S rRNA sequence data.

== Description ==
Adult size of southern leatherside chub varies between 10 and 110 mm (0.39 and 4.33 in) standard length. The body is covered with very small scales over a skin with a leathery texture, inspiring the common name. Overall coloration is bluish dorsally and silver ventrally; males are distinguished by patches of orange-red color on the axils of the paired fins, at the base of the anal fin, and along the lower lobe of the caudal fin, as well as golden-red specks at the upper end of the gill opening, and between eye and upper jaw. Unlike most other minnows, both dorsal and anal fins have eight rays. This species also exhibits a fusiform body shape with forked homocercal caudal fins. Although southern and northern leatherside chub are similar, the rostrum of the southern leatherside chub comes to a more defined point than the northern leatherside chub.

== Distribution and habitat ==
Within the state of Utah, the southern leatherside chub is found along the southeastern margins of the Bonneville Basin in the American Fork, Provo River, and Spanish Fork drainages of the Utah Lake Basin and the San Pitch River, East Fork Sevier River, and the lower, middle, and upper Sevier River drainages of the Sevier River Basin. They have been extirpated from the Beaver River. The Weber River system is an apparent boundary that separates the northern leatherside chub and southern leatherside chub. These fish are found in cooler temperature water with moderate currents in creeks, rivers, pools, or riffles where they can continuously feed. However, there is a general preference for pools rather than riffles. The southern leatherside chub also grows faster in warmer environments (e.g., water temperatures around 19 °C (66 °F)) than the northern leatherside chub.

== Diet ==
Both northern and southern leatherside dace are invertivores, consuming both aquatic and terrestrial invertebrates. Taxa of prey include Odonata, Trichoptera, Plecoptera, Lepidoptera, Coleoptera, Isopoda, and Amphipoda.

== Reproduction ==
The southern leatherside chub is a relatively short lived fish and matures at age 2-3 and has a maximum recorded age of 8 years. The first spawning event typically happens at age 2–3. Similar to northern leatherside chub, this species selects for small cobble in both pool and riffle habitats with little to no flow for spawning.

== Management ==
The southern leatherside chub is considered a species of greatest conservation need according to the Utah Division of Wildlife Resources. This species is threatened by habitat degradation caused by water abstraction for irrigation, channelization, damming, urbanization, and poor farming practices which lead to siltation. It is also threatened by introduced predatory fish such as brown trout (Salmo trutta). Environmental factors including seasonal drought may also play a significant role in population dynamics of this species.
