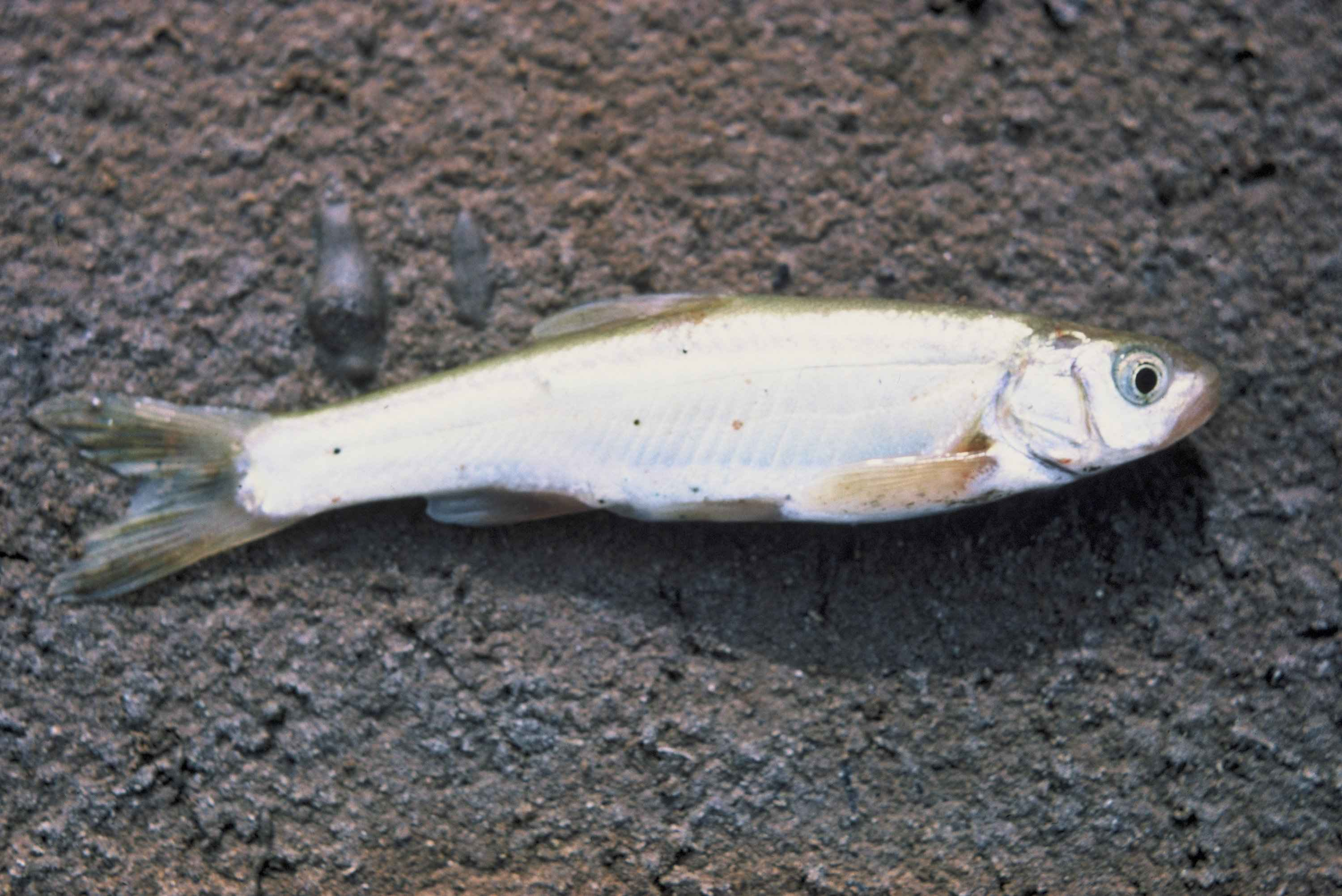

Conservation status
- Vulnerable (IUCN 3.1)

Scientific classification
- Kingdom: Animalia
- Phylum: Chordata
- Class: Actinopterygii
- Order: Cypriniformes
- Family: Leuciscidae
- Subfamily: Plagopterinae
- Genus: Lepidomeda
- Species: L. mollispinis

Binomial name
- Lepidomeda mollispinis R. R. Miller & C. L. Hubbs, 1960

= Virgin spinedace =

Species of fish

The Virgin spinedace (Lepidomeda mollispinis) is a species of freshwater ray-finned fish belonging to the family Leuciscidae, which includes the daces, Eurasian minnows and related species. This fish is restricted to the Virgin River, a tributary of the Colorado River in the United States.

== Description ==
This spinedace is overall silvery in color, with a brassy sheen and a pattern of sooty blotches or speckles on each side. The dorsal fin has eight rays, the first two of which are spiny, the second being longer than the one closer to the frontal area. The anal fin has eight to 10 rays, usually 9. The breeding male is more brightly colored, developing a band on the anal fin, orange to red shades on the paired fins, and a spot of red or gold color at the top of the gill slit. The Virgin spinedace adult is generally 6 to 12 centimetres (2.4 to 4.7 in) in total length. The mouth is less oblique than that of L. vittata. The dorsal fin is lower and rounded, and its depressed length is 5.6 to 6.1 centimetres (2.2 to 2.4 in). The Virgin Spinedace is omnivorous, with a diet of primarily aquatic insects, of note the larvae of Euparyphus and Hydropsyche.

== Habitat ==
The Virgin spinedace habitat is clear water about 1 metre (3 ft 3 in) deep, preferably close to cover, such as overhanging shrubs or banks, near vegetation, and over sand or gravel. The fish prefers slow water in areas that do not experience heavy flooding. The fish can tolerate water temperatures of 29 °C (84 °F) or higher, a useful ability in the summer when the river becomes intermittent and the fish must crowd into isolated pools. They prefer clear, cool, relatively swift streams with scattered pools, and often will use shear zones between low and high current velocities.

== Range ==
Populations are known throughout major tributaries of the Virgin River in Utah, Nevada, and Arizona, including the North Fork and East Fork of the Virgin River, Shunes Creek, North Creek, Ash Creek, La Verkin Creek, Leeds Creek, Quail Creek, Moody Wash, Magotsu Creek, the Santa Clara River, and Beaver Dam Wash.

== Population trends ==
By 1994, threats to the species reduced Virgin Spinedace populations to approximately 60% of their historic distribution. As a result of these threats, the Virgin Spinedace was proposed for listing in 1994 as a threatened species under the Endangered Species Act (ESA). The Virgin Spinedace Conservation Agreement and Strategy (VSCAS) was developed in 1995 in accordance with the ESA to improve conditions resulting in the decline of Virgin Spinedace, enhance habitat, and re-establish locally extirpated populations throughout the Virgin River basin. When implemented, management actions outlined in the VSCAS would alleviate factors warranting listing under the ESA. The primary goal of the VSCAS is to increase the range of the species from 60% to at least 80% (~ 185 kilometres (115 mi)) of its historically occupied habitat. The Virgin Spinedace Conservation Agreement and Strategy has been an effective vehicle for the conservation and recovery of Virgin Spinedace. Local, State, and Federal partners have reversed the decline in Virgin Spinedace abundance and distribution through implementation of the VSCAS.

Prior to the development of the VSCAS, Virgin Spinedace populations were declining throughout the Virgin River basin. The VSCAS has succeeded in developing cooperative partnerships to implement Virgin Spinedace recovery. The VSCAS has been an extremely effective, flexible, and powerful management tool for implementation of conservation actions to benefit Virgin Spinedace. Implementation of the VSCAS has succeeded in re-establishing previously extirpated populations of Virgin Spinedace. Conservation efforts have increased current (2020) Virgin Spinedace distribution by 71.7 kilometres (44.6 mi) above baseline 1995 occupied habitat (at the conception of the VSCAS). Areas identified and targeted under the VSCAS included: mainstem Virgin River below Quail Creek Diversion, Santa Clara River below Gunlock Reservoir, Beaver Dam Wash, and Quail and Leeds creeks. Increased Virgin Spinedace distribution has occurred at all VSCAS targeted locations; mainstem Virgin River below QCD (4.5 kilometres (2.8 mi)), Santa Clara River below Gunlock Reservoir (27.7 kilometres (17.2 mi)), Beaver Dam Wash below Schroeder Reservoir (11.8 kilometres (7.3 mi)), and Quail (1.4 kilometres (0.87 mi)) and Leeds (1.9 kilometres (1.2 mi)) creeks. Additional increases occurred on several stream reaches throughout the basin. The only loss of baseline occupied historic habitat in the 1995 VSCAS occurred in lower Ash Creek (3.3 kilometres (2.1 mi)); however conservation efforts restored Virgin Spinedace to 4.3 kilometres (2.7 mi) of habitat in upper Ash Creek that was not occupied in 1995. Virgin Spinedace currently occupy an additional 10.0 km (6.2 mi) of "above baseline" distribution habitat since the 1995 VSCAS. Above baseline distribution is habitat currently occupied by Virgin Spinedace but not identified as historic habitat in the 1995 VSCAS due to, omission, lack of previous records, or expansion from conservation efforts (North Creek). Virgin Spinedace have also naturally re-colonized portions of baseline occupied habitat following basin wide improvements in habitat, flow, and water quality conditions under the VSCAS. Virgin Spinedace currently occupy additional habitat in Moody Wash (3.1 kilometres (1.9 mi)), Racer Canyon (1.0 kilometre (0.62 mi)), La Verkin Creek (4.3 kilometres (2.7 mi)), and upper North Creek (1.6 kilometres (0.99 mi)). The primary goal of the VSCAS is to increase the range of Virgin Spinedace from approximately 60% to at least 80% of historically occupied habitat. Virgin Spinedace currently occupy 90.6% of historic habitat. This expansion has occurred despite periods of extreme drought, wildfires, and flooding that have negatively impacted Virgin Spinedace during the 25 years the VSCAS has been in place. Furthermore, Virgin Spinedace have expanded their distribution in an additional 10.0 kilometres (6.2 mi) of area above baseline occupied habitat. Self-sustaining Virgin Spinedace populations currently occur in 222.2 kilometres (138.1 mi) of stream across the Virgin River basin.

== Management factors ==
The major factors affecting Virgin spinedace are water development, habitat degradation, and invasive species competition.

Management emphasizes implementation of the VSCAS. Primary goals of the VSCAS include the restoration of population maintenance flows to re-establish viable Virgin Spinedace populations in dewatered or depleted stream reaches. Additional actions identified in the VSCAS include restoring habitat and populations, removal and control of non-native species, increasing habitat connectivity, and maintaining genetic viability. Virgin Spinedace population monitoring was identified by the VSCAS to track the status of Virgin Spinedace populations and their response to implemented conservation actions.
