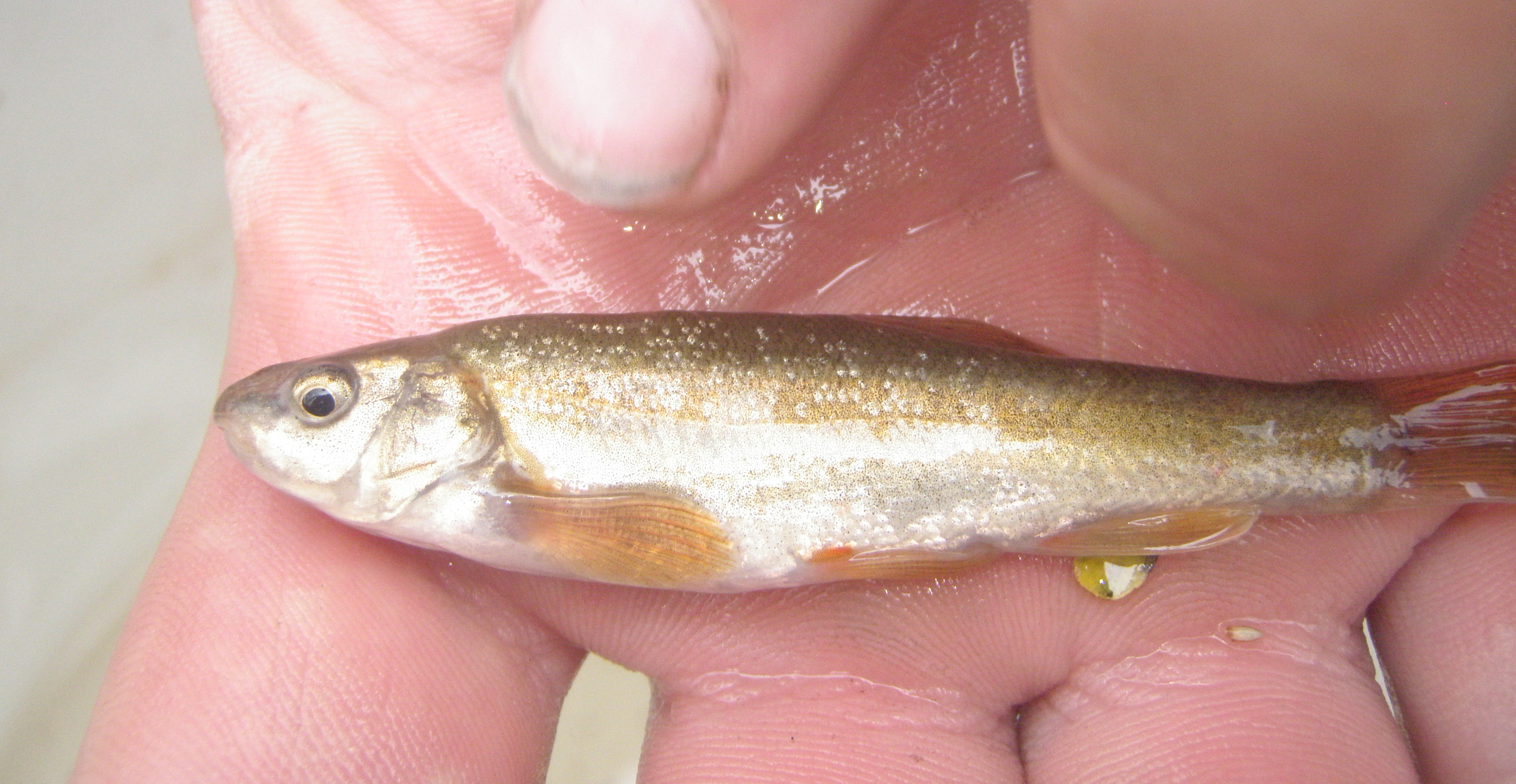

Conservation status
- Near Threatened (IUCN 3.1)

Scientific classification
- Kingdom: Animalia
- Phylum: Chordata
- Class: Actinopterygii
- Order: Cypriniformes
- Family: Leuciscidae
- Subfamily: Plagopterinae
- Genus: Lepidomeda
- Species: L. copei

Binomial name
- Lepidomeda copei (D. S. Jordan & C. H. Gilbert, 1881)
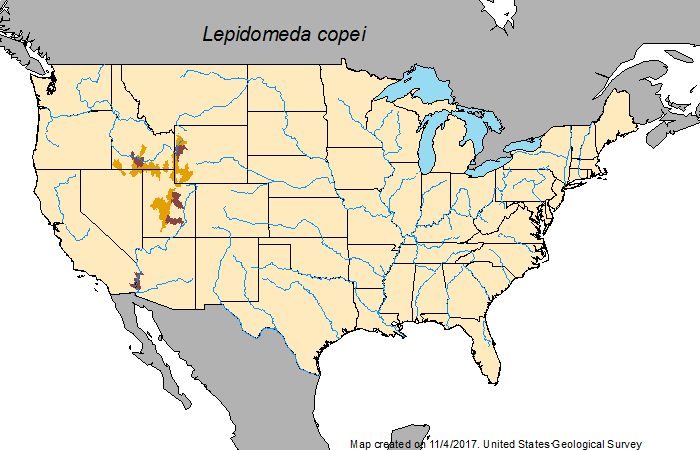

Synonyms
- Squalius copei (Jordan & Gilbert, 1881); Cheonda copei (Jordan & Gilbert, 1881); Gila copei (Jordan & Gilbert, 1881); Snyderichthys copei (Jordan & Gilbert, 1881)

= Northern leatherside chub =

Species of fish

The northern leatherside chub (Lepidomeda copei) is a small-bodied species of freshwater fish in the family Leuciscidae. It is found in the western United States.

== Taxonomy ==
The northern leatherside chub is morphologically similar to the southern leatherside chub, and both species were formerly considered a single species under the name Gila copei. Both species of leatherside chubs appear to be phylogenetically close to spinedaces (genus Lepidomeda) and the spikedaces (genus Meda). Currently, FishBase classifies northern and southern leatherside chub as distinct species within the genus Lepidomeda. This placement was verified using mtDNA 12S rRNA sequence data.

== Description ==
This species is small, reported at up to 15 cm (6 in) in length, but more typically half that size. The body is covered with very small scales over a skin with a leathery texture, inspiring the common name. Overall coloration is bluish dorsally and silver ventrally; males are distinguished by patches of orange-red color on the axils of the paired fins, at the base of the anal fin, and along the lower lobe of the caudal fin, as well as golden-red specks at the upper end of the gill opening, and between eye and upper jaw. Unlike most other minnows, both dorsal and anal fins have eight rays. This species also exhibits a fusiform body shape with forked homocercal caudal fins. Although southern and northern leatherside chub are similar, the rostrum of the southern leatherside chub comes to a more defined point than the northern leatherside chub.

== Distribution and habitat ==
Northern leatherside chub range from the upper Snake River system in Idaho and Wyoming to the Weber River in Utah. They have also been introduced into the Colorado River system, such as Strawberry Reservoir and Price River in Utah. However, it is uncertain whether these introductions are northern leatherside chub or southern leatherside chub. The northern leatherside chub prefer cooler creeks and rivers with moderate currents. Adults congregate in pools or riffles, while the young favor quiet areas with brush near the shore.

== Diet ==
Both northern and southern leatherside dace are invertivores, consuming both aquatic and terrestrial invertebrates. Taxa of prey include Odonata, Trichoptera, Plecoptera, Lepidoptera, Coleoptera, Isopoda, and Amphipoda.

== Management ==
The northern leatherside chub is considered a species of greatest conservation need in Idaho, Utah, and Wyoming. Across its range, the northern leatherside chub is threatened by habitat degradation caused by water abstraction for irrigation, channelization, damming, urbanization, and poor farming practices which lead to siltation. Additional threats include predation from nonnative brown trout (Salmo trutta) and drought.
