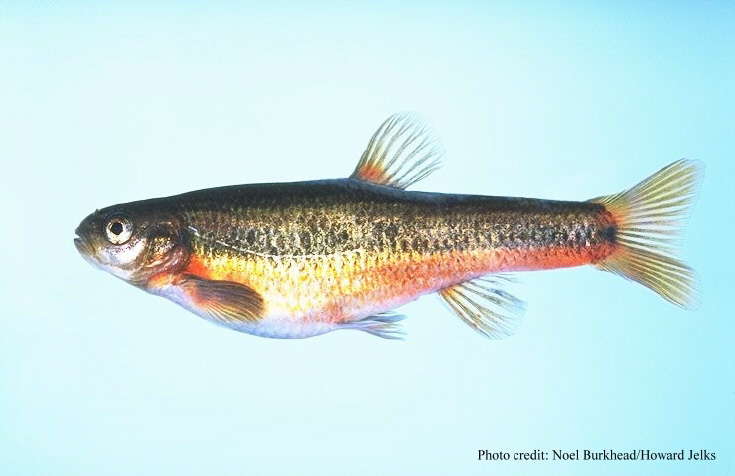
- Hemitremia flammea

Conservation status
- Near Threatened (IUCN 3.1)

- Vulnerable (NatureServe)

Scientific classification
- Kingdom: Animalia
- Phylum: Chordata
- Class: Actinopterygii
- Division: Teleostei
- Order: Cypriniformes
- Family: Leuciscidae
- Subfamily: Plagopterinae
- Genus: Hemitremia; Cope, 1870
- Species: H. flammea

Binomial name
- Hemitremia flammea (D. S. Jordan & C. H. Gilbert in Jordan, 1878)

Synonyms
- Phoxinus flammeus Jordan & Gilbert, 1878; Hemitremia vittata Cope, 1870

= Flame chub =

Species of fish

The flame chub (Hemitremia flammea) is a species of freshwater ray-finned fish belonging to the family Leuciscidae, which includes the daces, Eurasian minnows and related species. This fish is found only in the United States. Its range broadly follows the Tennessee River from above Knoxville, Tennessee, to the mouth of the Duck River. Historically the species was found in Kentucky, Tennessee, Alabama and Georgia. The preferred habitat of flame chub is in small flowing streams often associated with springs.

== Anatomy and appearance ==
The flame chub can be characterized by a deep caudal peduncle, short head and snout, small slightly subterminal mouth, and a barely compressed body. The dorsal fin originates slightly behind the pelvic fin origin. 7 – 8 anal soft rays, incomplete lateral line with 38 – 44 lateral scales, fewer than half of scales pored, pharyngeal teeth 2,5-4,2. Coloration is olive on the upper half of the body with a dark stripe along the back and dark streaks, bordered by a light stripe then black stripe ending at black caudal spot or wedge. White to red below, with bright scarlet along anterior third of body and at base of dorsal fin in large fish (primarily males) and silver peritoneum flecked with black. Males are more colorful than females, and both sexes are more colorful during spawning season. Flame chubs can grow to a maximum of 7.8 centimeters (3.1 in) long.

== Geographic distribution ==
Due to habitat alteration and destruction, the flame chub currently has a patchy range. The species primarily occurs in the Tennessee River Valley from the Knoxville, Tennessee area downstream through Alabama to the mouth of the Duck River in Tennessee. The majority of the population in Alabama resides in the Highland Rim or Cumberland Plateau regions. A single isolated population occurs in north Georgia in the Tiger Creek watershed of Catoosa County. In Alabama (which comprises approximately 50% of the remaining range of this species), only two populations are on public protected land, with the rest of the flame chub's habitat occurring on privately owned land. As such, the survival and further assessment of this species in Alabama is almost totally reliant on cooperation with private land owners.

== Ecology ==
While often cited by literature that the flame chub inhabits spring-fed streams, shallow seepage waters, and springs, usually over gravel in areas of abundant aquatic vegetation, substrate the species is found over can vary from bedrock to rubble to mud and may be found in areas of low flow near the bank of large streams. A study by P. W. Shute notes that although the flame chub is often described as a spring-dwelling species, only 37 of 231 collection localities were springs. Despite this, the species can still be found primarily in association with spring heads, as most collection localities are found within watersheds that are fed by springs. Most documented records of this species are found in small streams. It has been hypothesized that this species is migratory within its range, either travelling from its native stream to headwaters for spawning, or existing in metapopulations with the springs serving as both sources for the stream localities and as refugia. It has also been observed that adult flame chubs may aggregate in flooded fields and pastures for spawning. Due to the fragile nature of springs and their tributaries, human expansion has caused further disjunction in the range of this already narrow endemic species. As of 2014, IUCN considers this species to be Near Threatened due to ongoing threats from introduced non-native fish species and human habitat alteration.

The temperature of sampled streams where flame chubs are known to occur ranged from 24 °C (75 °F) in July to 8 °C (46 °F) in February. TDS varied from 17 to 213 ppm, with a pH ranging from 6.4 to 8.2. In 1990, Sossamon recorded that a flame chub population in east Tennessee was normally found associated with aquatic vegetation such as swamp smartweed, small pondweed, and watercress. The flame chub almost exclusively (77–100% of the contents of the digestive tract) eats dipteran larvae and pupae. Gastropods, aquatic oligochaetes, hemipterans, and cladocerans are also taken occasionally. The occurrence of seeds, sand grains, and detritus in the gut of the flame chub indicates that flame chubs feed on or near the substrate. In observations in aquaria, the flame chub pecks at the substrate.

== Life history ==
One Tennessee study of flame chub hatching found that hatching began in early May (and possibly earlier) and continued through late May. Gravel is a very important factor in the breeding patterns of these fish, as it is necessary for filtration of extremely clean water as well as bottom stability for a species that spends a lot of its time in the benthos area of the stream. No data are available pertaining to the species' lifespan.

== Conservation and management ==
This species is currently listed as near threatened according to the IUCN Red List. A study done near Chattanooga, Tennessee showed that where oxygen levels were high, and where well-forested rocky watersheds were found, that the density of the Flame Chub as well as similar fish were much higher. Habitat destruction is one of the main causes of the decline of this species. It is sensitive to alteration of its habitat, and is now extirpated from Kentucky, and close to extirpation in Georgia. A 2007 survey in north Alabama recovered flame chubs at only 19 of 53 localities that in the 1960s still had populations. Many sites were obviously degraded by forms of land use change such as putting a stream in a concrete culvert, or paving over part of a stream.
