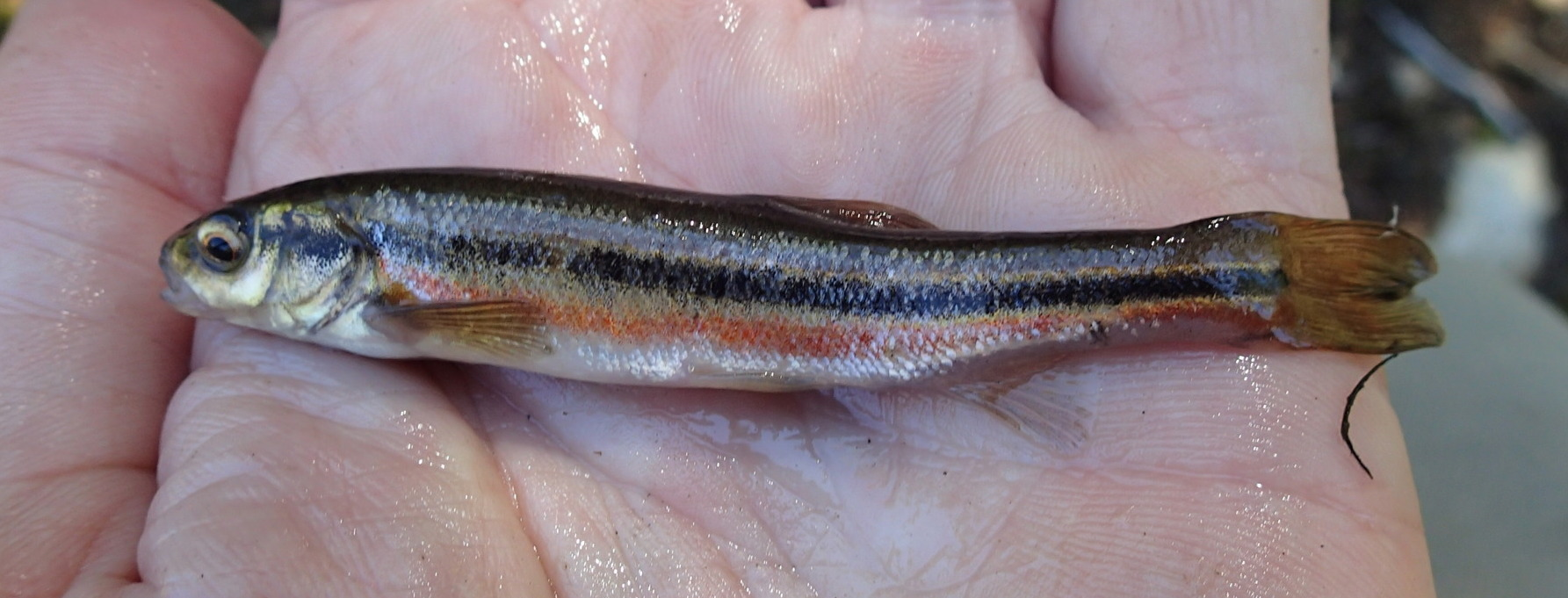

Conservation status
- Least Concern (IUCN 3.1)

Scientific classification
- Kingdom: Animalia
- Phylum: Chordata
- Class: Actinopterygii
- Order: Cypriniformes
- Family: Leuciscidae
- Genus: Margariscus
- Species: M. nachtriebi

Binomial name
- Margariscus nachtriebi (Cox, 1896)

Synonyms
- Leuciscus nachtriebi Cox, 1896

= Northern pearl dace =

Species of fish

The northern pearl dace (Margariscus nachtriebi) is a freshwater ray-finned fish in the family Cyprinidae, the carps and minnows. It occurs in Atlantic, Hudson Bay, Great Lakes, and Mississippi River basins in the northern United States and Canada. Its preferred habitat is cool, clear headwater streams, bog drainage streams, ponds and small lakes, and in stained, peaty waters of beaver ponds, usually over sand or gravel.
