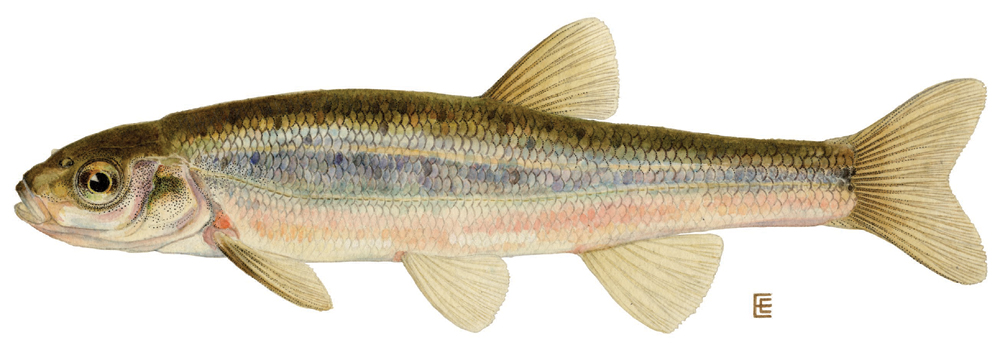
- Margariscus margarita

Scientific classification
- Domain: Eukaryota
- Kingdom: Animalia
- Phylum: Chordata
- Class: Actinopterygii
- Order: Cypriniformes
- Family: Leuciscidae
- Subfamily: Plagopterinae
- Genus: Margariscus; Cockerell, 1909

Type species
- Clinostomus margarita Cope, 1867

= Margariscus =

Genus of fishes

Margariscus, known as the pearl daces, is a genus of leusiscid fishes found in North America. There are currently two recognized species in this genus. Margariscus comes from the Greek word margariskos, meaning pearl.

== Species ==
- Margariscus margarita (Cope, 1867) (Allegheny pearl dace)
- Margariscus nachtriebi (Cox, 1896) (Northern pearl dace)
