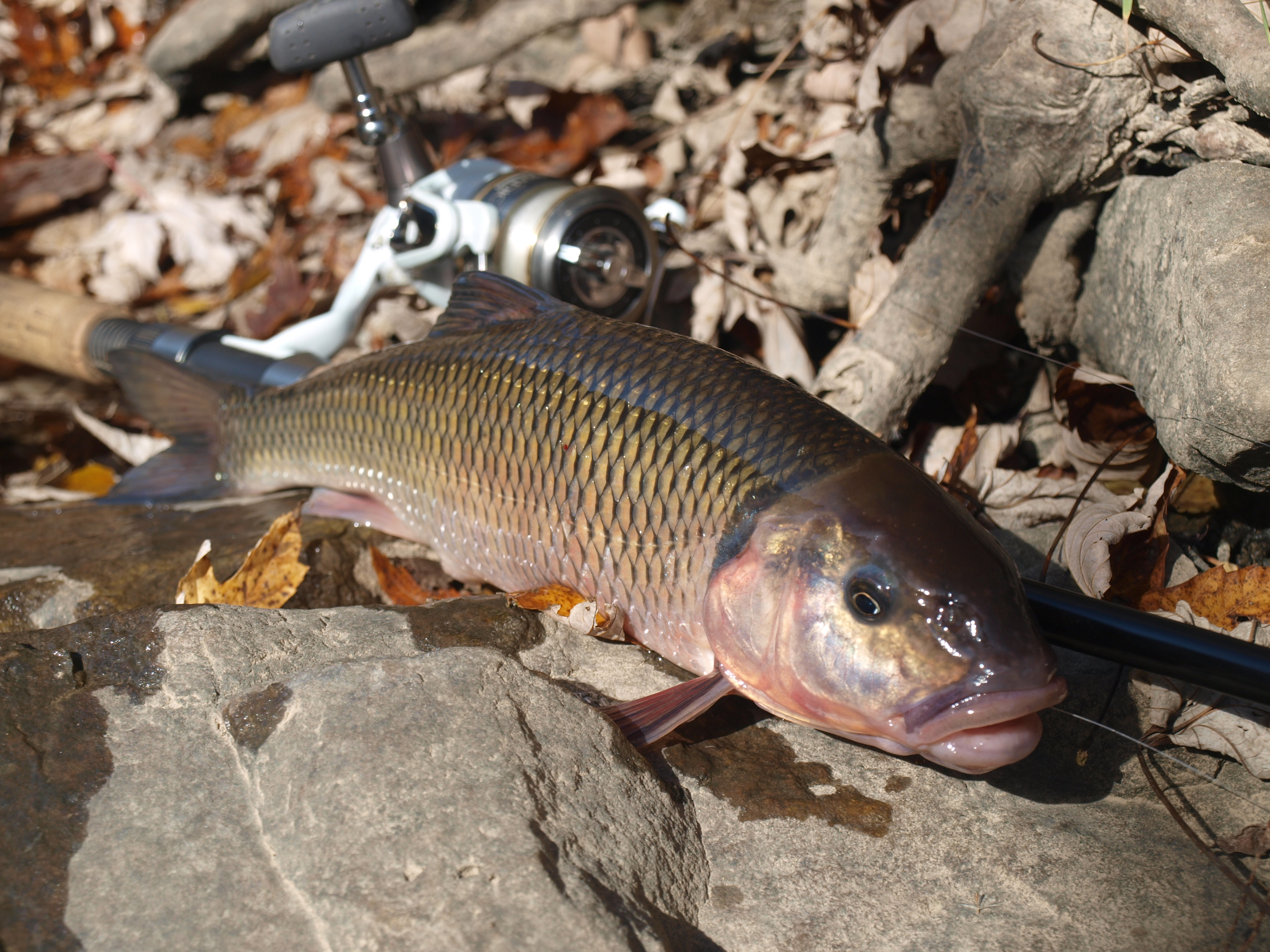

Conservation status
- Least Concern (IUCN 3.1)

Scientific classification
- Kingdom: Animalia
- Phylum: Chordata
- Class: Actinopterygii
- Order: Cypriniformes
- Family: Leuciscidae
- Subfamily: Plagopterinae
- Genus: Semotilus
- Species: S. corporalis

Binomial name
- Semotilus corporalis (Mitchill, 1817)

Synonyms
- Cyprinus corporalis Mitchill, 1817; Cheilonemus corporalis (Mitchill, 1817); Cyprinus bullaris Rafinesque, 1817; Leuciscus pulchellus Storer, 1839; Leuciscus argenteus Storer, 1839; Leuciscus nitidus DeKay, 1842; Chilonemus cataractus Baird, 1851; Leucosomus rhotheus Cope, 1861; Squalius hyalope Cope, 1865

= Fallfish =

Species of fish

The fallfish (Semotilus corporalis) is a species of freshwater ray-finned fish in the family Leuciscidae. The fallfish is the largest minnow species native to Eastern North America.

== Description ==
Average specimens generally measure about 7 in (18 cm) in length, but individuals occasionally grow to 15 in (38 cm) with exceptional specimens of more than 19 in (48 cm) having been recorded. Juvenile fallfish have a dark stripe that runs down the center of their body. They are a silvery shade on the top and sides of the body, but have a white shading on the belly. Breeding males develop a pinkish tone on the opercular region, although the species does not develop bright breeding colors. Spawning males build stone nests, known as a redd, which form a prominent part of the bottom on many streams throughout the northeast. Spawning is communal with both males and females joining the nest builder.

== Distribution and habitat ==
Fallfish are found in the northeastern United States and eastern Canada, where they inhabit clear streams, lakes, and ponds. They predominantly prefer swift currents, however, they can also be found in well oxygenated pools. As their name suggests they are often found at the base of waterfalls. Before the introduction of fish such as smallmouth bass, largemouth bass, and brown trout, the fallfish was the apex predator in many streams.

== Diet and predation ==
Juvenile and young fallfish primarily consume chironomids and zooplankton. Once they reach 100mm their diet transitions to small fish (including their own young) and prey of opportunity such as fish eggs and terrestrial insects. There is little overlap between the diets of juvenile and adult fallfish.

== Angling ==
Fallfish are often encountered when fishing for more desirable species, but their large size, dogged fighting style, powerful runs on light tackle, and willingness to strike make them a worthy quarry in their own right. They will readily take bait, lures, and flies, and have been known to strike lures almost as large as themselves.

The International Game Fish Association (IGFA) All Tackle World Record for fallfish is 1.65 kg (3 lb 10 oz), caught by Jonathan McNamara in the Susquehanna River near Owego, New York, USA on April 15, 2009. The record was tied on May 6, 2022, by angler Josh D. Dolin while fishing the Cowpasture River near Williamsville, Virginia. Two heavier, more recent, record fish from this river are currently pending, which will take the former record to 4.0 lb (1.81 kg). Previous records came from New Hampshire and Pennsylvania. Alex Pidhorodeckyj caught a record-breaking fallfish weighing 4 lbs. 1 oz. from the St. Lawrence River, St. Lawrence County on May 13, 2025. This broke the 16-year-old record caught from the Susquehanna River by nearly half a pound.

Thoreau said of its eating qualities: "it tastes of brown paper, salted."

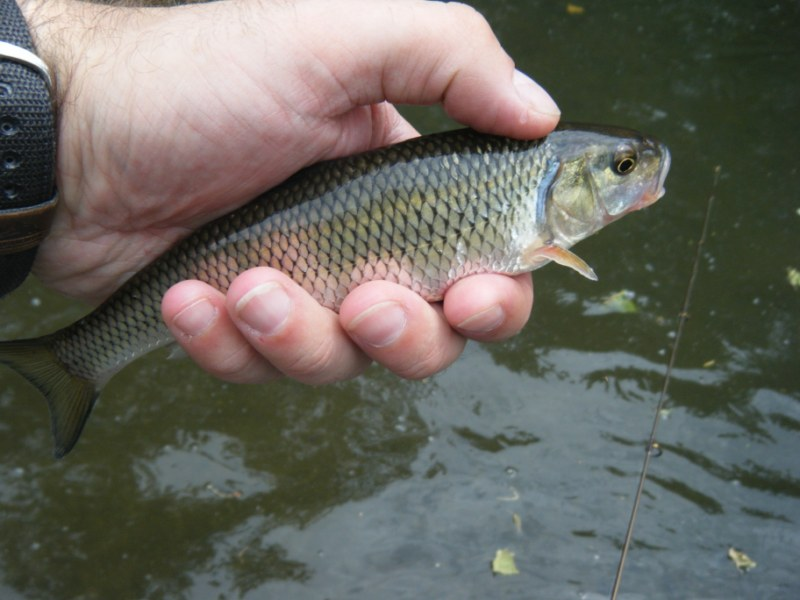
Fallfish

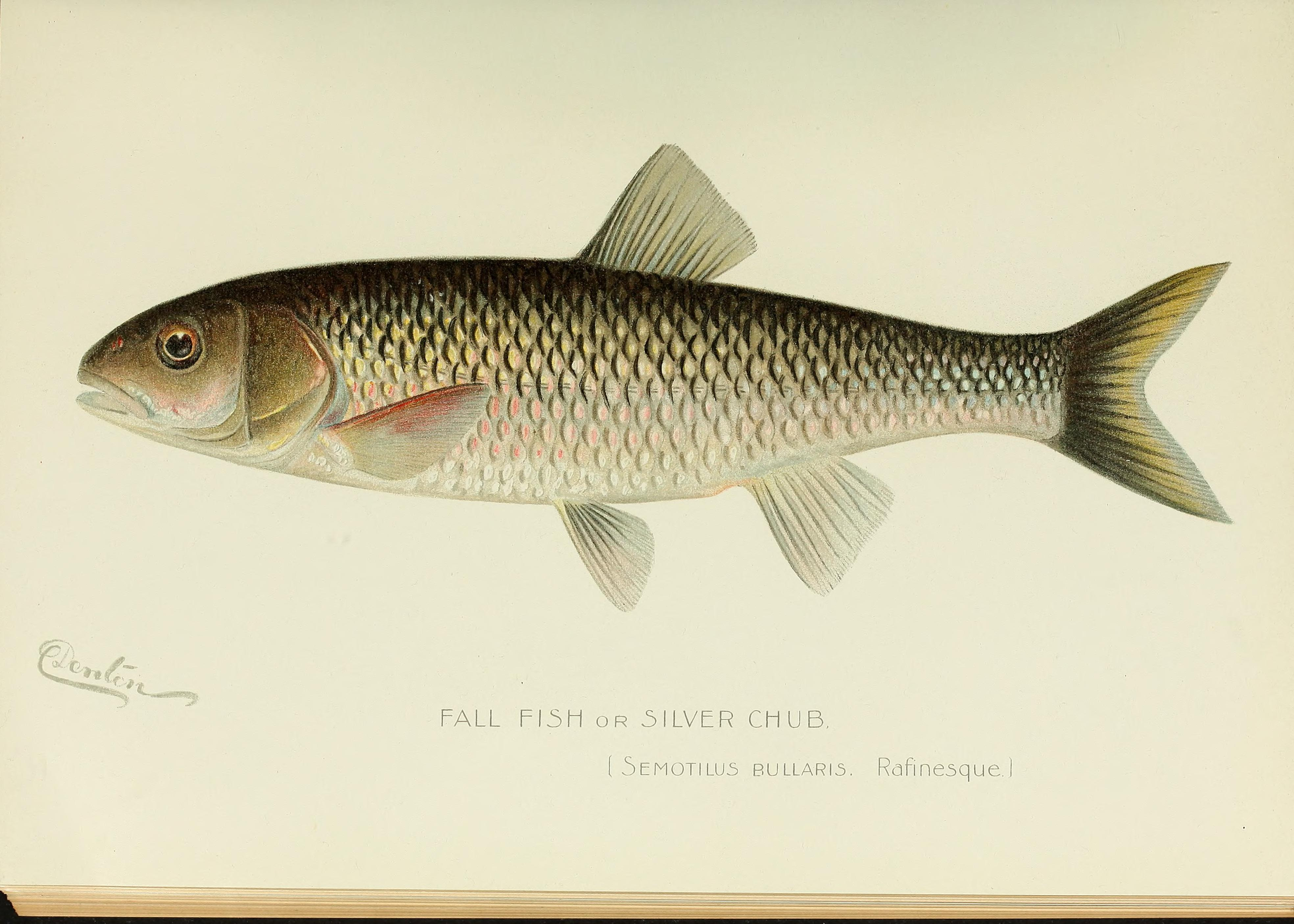
Annual report of the Commissioners of Fisheries, Game and Forests of the State of New York (1896)

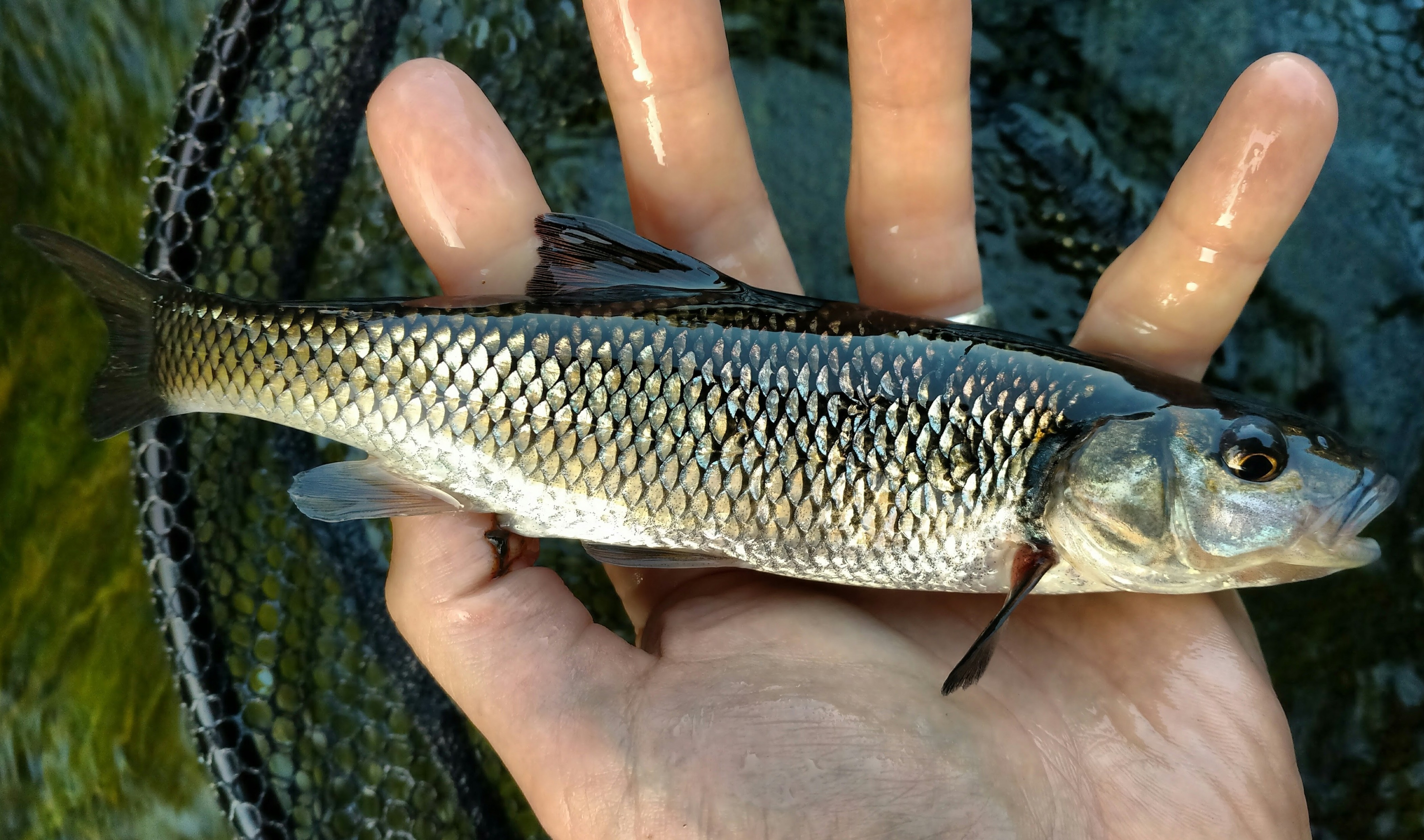
Fallfish caught in Massachusetts
