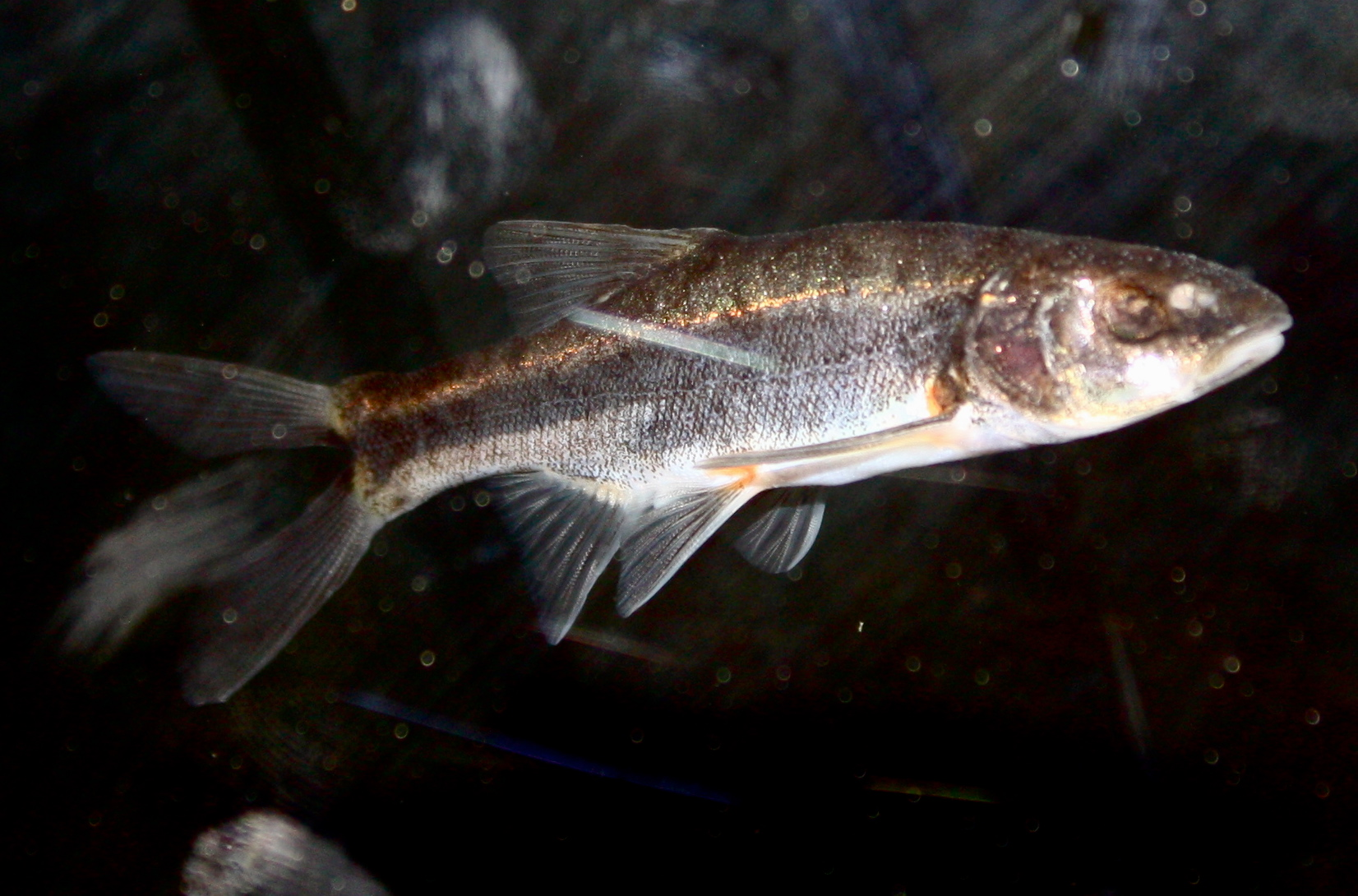

Conservation status
- Endangered (IUCN 3.1)

Scientific classification
- Kingdom: Animalia
- Phylum: Chordata
- Class: Actinopterygii
- Order: Cypriniformes
- Family: Leuciscidae
- Subfamily: Plagopterinae
- Genus: Lepidomeda
- Species: L. vittata

Binomial name
- Lepidomeda vittata Cope, 1874

Synonyms
- Lepidomeda jarrovii Cope, 1871

= Little Colorado spinedace =

Species of fish

The Little Colorado spinedace (Lepidomeda vittata) is a species of ray-finned fish in the family Leuciscidae. It is found only in Arizona in the United States.

== Description ==
The Little Colorado spinedace is small, generally less than 10 cm in length. The scales are in a lateral line of usually more than 90. The second spine of the dorsal fin is strong. The dorsal fin is moderately high and acute, and its depressed length is 5.2 to 5.8 cm predorsal length. There are eight anal fin rays, and rarely nine. The pharyngeal teeth are in two rows. The Little Colorado spinedace sides are usually silvery, darker above and sometimes white below, rarely with lateral blotches. The upper side and back are a bit of a bluish or lead grey. The breeding Little Colorado Spinedace males have bases of paired fins watery-yellow to orange or red-orange, otherwise however the fins are clear, and parts of the belly are watery-yellow.

== Range ==
The Little Colorado spinedace is endemic to the Little Colorado River and north-flowing tributaries, flowing through Coconino, Navajo, and Apache Counties of Arizona. The historical distribution is similar to the current distribution but the species may have possibly historically occurred in the Zuni River watershed south of Gallup, New Mexico. The Little Colorado spinedace are now considered extirpated from the Silver Creek and its tributaries.

Four populations of spinedace exist in Arizona with populations still found in the mainstream of Little Colorado, Nutrioso Creek, Clear Creek, as well as Chevelon Creek.

== Habitat ==
The Little Colorado spinedace is found in water ranging from 0.16-1.3 meters in-depth, but most abundant in depths of around 0.6 meters. The fish are most common in slow to moderate water currents, over fine gravel bottoms. They normally avoid deep, heavily shaded pools and shallow, open areas. They generally prefer unshaded pools with rocks or undercut banks for cover. Temperatures where populations exist generally range from 14-26 degrees Celsius. Young of the year are most abundant on uniformly turbulent riffles 10 to 25 cm in depth.

== Population trends ==
Populations of this species fluctuate dramatically from year to year, and probably reflect cyclic periods of drought and/or increased rainfall. Populations are thought to be declining, however, due to alteration of habitat through reduced streamflow and interaction with introduced fish species.

== Management factors ==
Limiting factors include road construction, timber harvest operations, stream gravel removal, and chemical treatment of streams. Additional limiting factors and concerns include decreased streamflow, impoundment of water, and interaction with and predation by, introduced exotic fishes. Predation by rainbow trout has been strongly suggested as an important factor in the success and distribution of L. vittata.
