= White River (Nevada) =

River in Nevada, United States

Coordinates: 37°40′03″N 115°11′38″W

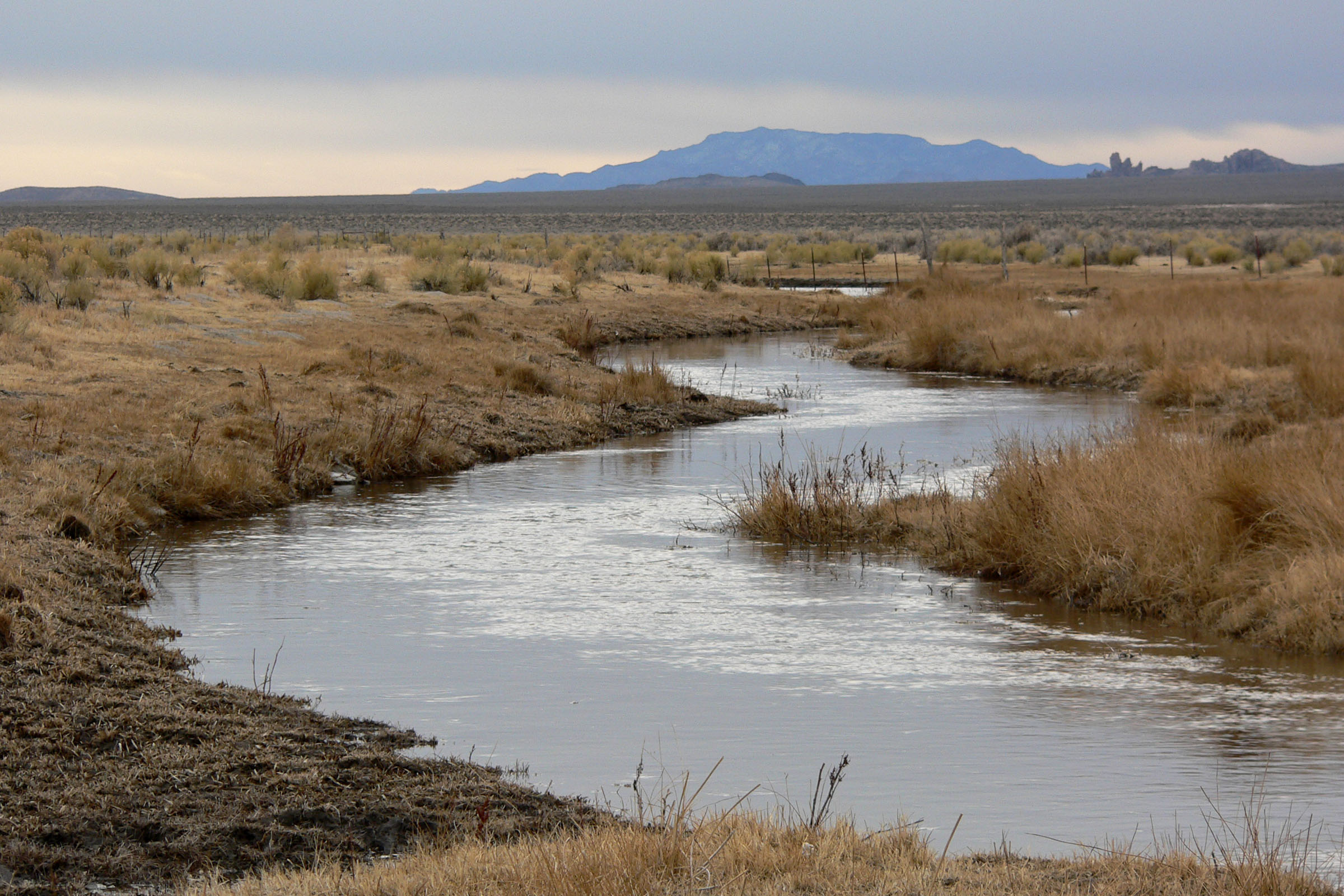
- The White River running through Murphy Meadows near Sunnyside

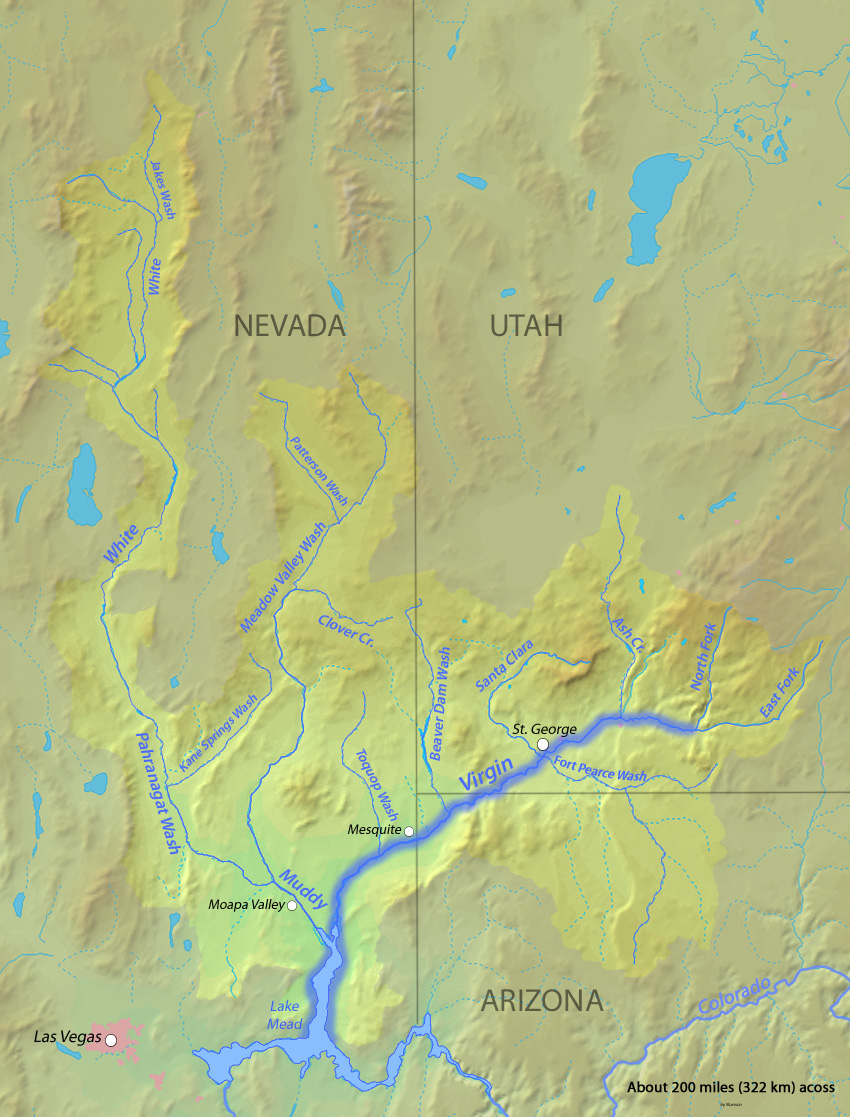
- The White River (northwest portion of map) is bordered on three sides by endorheic basins of the Great Basin.

Location
- Country: United States
- State: Nevada

Physical characteristics
- Mouth: Muddy River

Basin features
- River system: Colorado River Basin

The White River is a small and discontinuous 138-mile-long (222 km) river located in southeastern Nevada notable for several endemic species of fish. The river was named for F. A. White, a 19th-century explorer.

== Course ==
The White River begins at the Great Basin Divide in the White Pine Range near Ely, where it is fed by snowmelt and springs from Currant Mountain. It passes by the towns of Preston and Lund, flowing south through the White River Valley more or less continuously for about 40 miles (64 km). Along the way it receives water from various springs on the slopes of the Grant Range to the west and the Egan Range to the east. It provides the water for a string of reservoirs along its course in the Sunnyside area, the largest being Adams-McGill Reservoir. State Route 318 runs mostly parallel to the river.

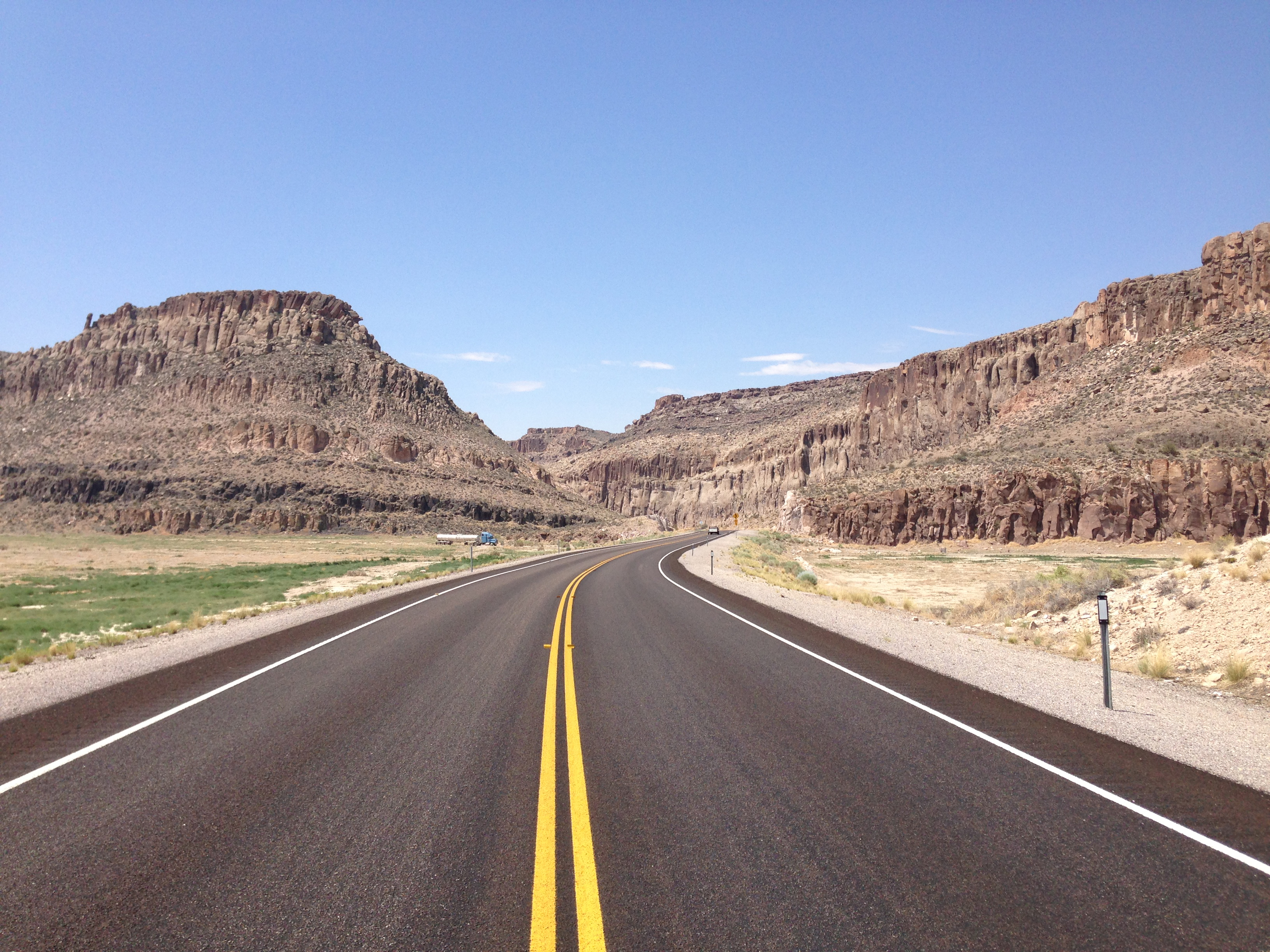
The White River Narrows, viewed from southbound State Route 318. The channel is usually dry through this section.

The river channel is dry for some distance, then the water flows again in the Pahranagat Valley for about 30 mi (48 km), from the vicinity of Hiko and Crystal Springs, passing close by Alamo, feeding Upper Pahranagat Lake and the marshes between it and the lower lake (which collectively form the Pahranagat National Wildlife Refuge). The channel continues into Coyote Springs Valley (location of the planned community Coyote Springs), becoming the Pahranagat Wash, which in turn connects to the Muddy River and thence to Lake Mead.

Many of the springs supplying the river are now used for irrigation, and a number of the springs have temperatures over 100 °F (38 °C).

== Fish ==
The White River system features several endemic fish species:

- White River Colorado gila Gila robusta jordani
- White River speckled dace Rhinichthys osculus velifer
- White River spinedace Lepidomeda albivallis. Less than 50 of this endangered fish remained in 1993.
- Pahranagat spinedace Lepidomeda altivelis
- White River springfish Crenichthys baileyi

Also named for the area is the White River mountainsucker (Pantosteus intermedius) subspecies.

== See also ==
- List of rivers of Nevada
- White River Narrows
