= Sandhills chub =

Conservation status
- Least Concern (IUCN 3.1)

Scientific classification
- Kingdom: Animalia
- Phylum: Chordata
- Class: Actinopterygii
- Order: Cypriniformes
- Family: Leuciscidae
- Subfamily: Plagopterinae
- Genus: Semotilus
- Species: S. lumbee

Binomial name
- Semotilus lumbee Snelson & Suttkus, 1978

Species of fish

The Sandhills chub (Semotilus lumbee) is a species of freshwater ray-finned fish belonging to the family Leuciscidae. There are 4 species of Semotilus, 2 of which occur in South Carolina (Creek Chub and Sandhills Chub). This fish is found only in North Carolina and South Carolina. The Sandhills chub is predominately found in the Carolina Sandhills and some areas of Cape Fear, Pee Dee and Santee river drainages. It is characterized by its robust body, large head and lack of a dark blotch or smudge on their dorsal fin which is present on the closely related Creek Chub. The Sandhills chub has fine scales, a pinkish body and can be up to 9.4 inches.

== Range and distribution ==
The Sandhills Chub is mostly found in the headwaters of streams in the Carolina Sandhills area and the populations are pretty stable in the small range of streams they live in. They are a vulnerable species due to their limited habitat and occurrences are mostly in the upper Lumber River system (Pee Dee drainage) and also in adjacent tributaries of the Cape Fear drainage. The total adult population size is unknown but is estimated to exceed over 10,000.

== Physical description ==
The Sandhills chub is a minnow that has a large mouth in a terminal position with a small flap-like barbel located on the corners of their mouths. It has nine dorsal fin rays and either has a light black spot or does not at the base of the dorsal fin. Their dorsal fin is located behind the pelvic fins. It has a slightly lunate caudal fin giving it a more curved fin. Its body is usually more than one color and they tend to have 46 lateral line scales, they also have cycloid scales which males them seem smooth when touched. Breeding male Sandhills chubs have a pinkish hue and orange fins, the adult fish tend to get up to 3.1–9.4 cm (1.2–3.7 in). They are bottom-fishes as they live in small streams and are more adapted for living on the bottom of the body of water they live in.

== Reproduction ==
Reproduction usually happens between April and May, the best time is when temperatures are around the mid 50s (°F). The male will develop breeding tubercles on his head and the females are usually pinned down with their caudal peduncle under the males. The male mostly protects the nest during reproduction, and there aren't many predatory threats to Sandhills chub eggs.

== Habitat ==
The Carolina Sandhills are north east of the Fall Line Hills which extend from central North Carolina through central Alabama and through eastern Mississippi. The area is surrounded by loose sand and is drained by numerous small, cold and fast-flowing streams, which allows for a number of rare plants and animals to reside here. This fish prefers clear, cool and medium-current streams with little to no vegetation, The Sandhills chub are restricted to headwater streams, which can be easily impacted by humans. They are also generally associated with streams with clean gravel and/or sand substrates.

== Conservation status ==
The Sandhills chub is threatened by disturbances to their environment due to the Carolina Sandhills becoming a more agricultural, residential and tourist area. Damming of headwaters to create golf course ponds has changed the water flow and the habitats of the chub. There is also road management which can sometimes result in stream siltation and use of pesticides in the nearby area may cause water pollution. The main threat to the Sandhills chub is habitat alteration as more predaceous species are being introduced into the North Carolina headwaters.

== Reference list ==
- Froese, Rainer; Pauly, Daniel, eds. (2012). "Semotilus lumbee". FishBase.
- Rohde, F.C., R.G. Arndt, D.G. Lindquist, and J.F. Parnell. 1994. Freshwater Fishes of the

Carolinas, Virginia, Maryland, and Delaware. The University of North Carolina Press. Chapel Hill, North Carolina. 222 pp

- Keller, Verena, and Kurt Bollmann. "From Red Lists to Species of Conservation Concern." Conservation Biology 18.6 (2004): 1636-644. DNR. Web. 1 May 2017. [<http://dnr.sc.gov/swap/supplemental/freshwaterfish/sandhillschub2015.pdf>.]
- Bettinger, Jason, and Mark Scott. "Sandhills Chub." Supplemental Volume: Species of Conservation Concern (2015): 1-4. DNR. Web. 1 May 2017.
