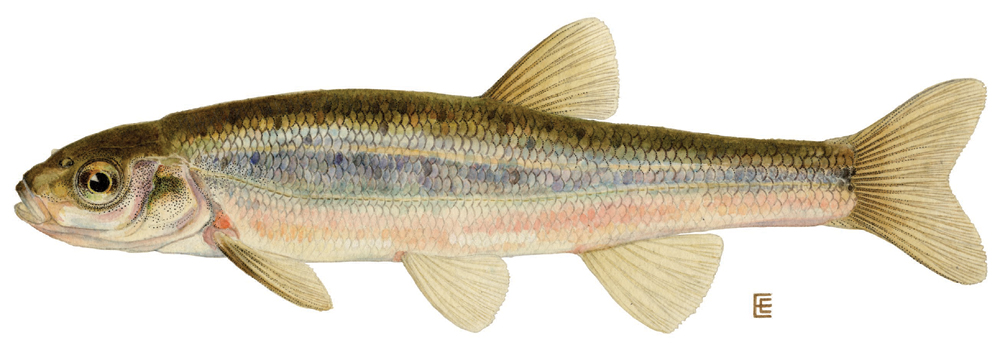

Conservation status
- Least Concern (IUCN 3.1)

Scientific classification
- Kingdom: Animalia
- Phylum: Chordata
- Class: Actinopterygii
- Order: Cypriniformes
- Family: Leuciscidae
- Genus: Margariscus
- Species: M. margarita

Binomial name
- Margariscus margarita (Cope, 1867)

Synonyms
- Clinostomus margarita Cope, 1867; Leuciscus carletoni Kendall, 1903; Leuciscus margarita (Cope, 1867); Semotilus margarita (Cope, 1867)

= Allegheny pearl dace =

Species of fish

The Allegheny Pearl Dace (Margariscus margarita) is a species of freshwater ray-finned fish in the class Teleostei. It belongs to the order Cypriniformes, family Leuciscidae and subfamily Plagopterinae. It is a demersal freshwater fish with a dark green back and silvery body. This species is omnivorous, consuming algae and arthropods. M. margarita's range spans southern Canada and the northern United States.

== Description ==
M. margarita is a bottom-dwelling freshwater fish that can reach 76-102 mm in length. The maximum age M. margarita has been recorded to reach is four years. Its body is long, with small eyes and a small mouth. There are eight rays in each of the dorsal, anal, and pelvic fins. The dorsal side is dark green, with silvery flanks and a grey or white ventral side. Between late autumn and summer, males may have a brilliant orange-red stripe on the flanks, below the lateral line. This species is omnivorous: its diet comprises algae, insect larvae, as well as arthropods, such as chironomids and water fleas. M. margarita is often confused with the Northern Pearl Dace (Margariscus nachtriebi). Other fish that get confused for M. margarita are the blacknose dace and longnose dace. M. margarita has a barbel in front of the end of the maxillary instead of having a maxillary barbel that is terminal, like the blacknose and longnose dace. Finescale and redbelly daces do not have a lateral line that goes all the way to the end of the tail. These fish also vary in scale sizes.

== Distribution and habitat ==
This species inhabits North America and Southern Canada and can be found in the Mississippi River, Hudson Bay, and the Great Lakes. M. margarita inhabits lakes, ponds, and rivers usually over a sandy or gravelly substrate. Studies have found this fish to inhabit parts of Wyoming, USA, in grassland and prairie ecosystems. One study found that the population in Wyoming was steady. It feeds by sight, so the waters it inhabits are generally clear streams and bog drainage systems. They prefer cool water with minimal turbidity. During spawning, they live in water as cold as 60.8°F.

One study examined the catch per unit effort of M. margarita and found that its population was easier to sample than those of other minnows. Over their seven-year study, they found a minimum of around 3,000 pearl dace minnows per year. The authors of the study hypothesized that any changes in the average number of pearl dace caught in the minnow trap could have been attributed to personality differences. More specifically, fish with less fear were probably caught more frequently than ones with more fear. This study helped scientists understand how to improve monitoring of fish population sizes.

== Biology and life history ==
M. margarita spawns in the spring in calm water, 45-60 cm deep over silt or gravel areas. This species typically reaches sexual maturity at one year and has short reproductive cycles. Beginning in April, males develop a bright red line along their bodies during spawning. In South Dakota, M. margarita has been found to reproduce successfully in beaver ponds. M. margarita living in Isle Royale, Michigan, has been hypothesized to have diverged due to being separated from the regular population.

== Conservation status ==
Margariscus margarita is not considered endangered federally in the United States, and the IUCN Red List classifies the Allegheny Pearl Dace as a species of least concern. However, in several states, it is considered locally endangered or threatened. The species is now uncommon in the Great Plains region, having declined since the region's settlement by European colonists.

M. margarita is threatened primarily by habitat destruction and alteration, as well as by introduced species. Human activities such as reservoir construction, groundwater pumping, stream diversions, and channelization contribute to habitat loss. The introduction of exotic species such as bass, pike, or trout has an especially detrimental effect on this species. M. margarita is also caught for use as bait, which may further contribute to its decline.

Although populations are generally considered stable, studies have highlighted that the over-pumping of water threatens their habitat, and the potential for an introduction of stronger predators gives opportunity for the population to face a decline in numbers. Another factor contributing to their declining numbers in some states is habitat development. As humans construct more waterfront properties, their habitat becomes increasingly altered, which leads to an increase in local extinction rates.

== Relationship to humans ==
In Manitoba, M. margarita has been heavily used as live bait and is a large prey source for game fish. It has been caught by placing beef liver inside minnow traps. Fly fishers have documented catching it on dry flies while attempting to catch trout. Studies have also used M. margarita to understand how fish respond to living in environments contaminated by pollutants. One study found that the livers of these fish accumulated more fat after they were exposed to diesel fuel. These fish also reacted by spawning later than normal.
