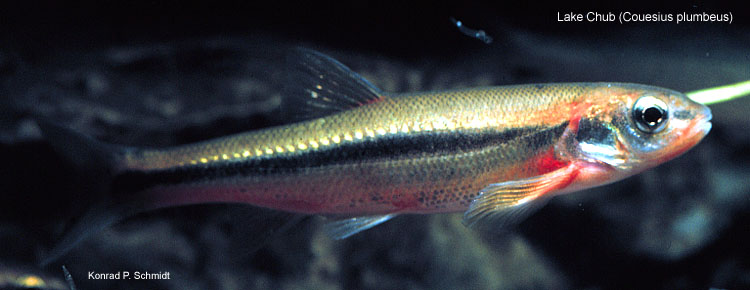

Conservation status
- Least Concern (IUCN 3.1)

- Secure (NatureServe)

Scientific classification
- Kingdom: Animalia
- Phylum: Chordata
- Class: Actinopterygii
- Order: Cypriniformes
- Family: Leuciscidae
- Subfamily: Plagopterinae
- Genus: Couesius; D. S. Jordan, 1878
- Species: C. plumbeus

Binomial name
- Couesius plumbeus (Agassiz, 1850)

Synonyms
- Gobio plumbeus Agassiz, 1850; Leucosomus dissimilis Girard, 1856; Ceratichthys prosthemius Cope, 1867; Nocomis milneri D. S. Jordan, 1877; Couesius greeni D. S. Jordan, 1893; Couesius adustus Woolman, 1894; Couesius plumbeus rubrilateralis P. Cox, 1901

= Lake chub =

Species of fish

The lake chub (Couesius plumbeus) is a species of freshwater ray-finned fish belonging to the family Leuciscidae, which includes the daces, Eurasian minnows and related species. This fish is found in Canada and in parts of the United States. Of all North American minnows, it is the one with the northernmost distribution. Its genus, Couesius, is considered monotypic today. The genus was named after Elliott Coues, who collected the holotype specimen.

== Description ==
The body is fusiform and somewhat elongate. It is usually 100 to 175 mm (4 to 7 in) long, where the maximum length is approximately 225 mm (9 in). The back is olive-brown or dark brown, and the sides are leaden silver, hence the word plumbeus, referring to lead, in the scientific name of this fish. The snout is blunt and projects slightly beyond the upper lip. The corners of the mouth each bear a small barbel. The scales are small but well visible, and some may be black and form isolated dark spots on the lower sides. The dorsal, pelvic, and anal fins each have 8 rays. The pectoral fins are broad and have 13–18, but more usually 15–16, rays. The fish has no teeth, adipose fin, or spines. The mouth is relatively small, and the tail is forked. Breeding males can develop patches of bright orange or red at the base of the pectoral fins and sometimes near the mouth, and small nuptial tubercles on the top of the head, dorsal surface of pectoral rays, and on the belly near the base of the pectorals. The juveniles are similar to the adults, but have less obvious mottling or stripes. The females are typically larger than the males.

== Distribution ==
The lake chub is generally found throughout Canada up to the Arctic Circle. Some scattered populations are also present in the northern United States, more precisely in New England, Michigan, Iowa, Wisconsin, Minnesota, the Dakotas, Montana, Wyoming, Colorado, Washington, Idaho and Utah. The lake chub is also the only minnow known to live in Alaska. Its range also includes Lake Michigan in Illinois and the Platte River system in Wyoming. There are relict populations of the lake chub in the upper Missouri River drainage.

== Habitat ==
As its common name implies, the lake chub is most commonly found in cold-water lakes with clean gravel, and it can also live in cold-water rivers and streams. It often lives in shallows, but during mid-summer, it may move to the deeper parts of a lake to avoid the warmer waters of the lake shore.

== Diet ==
The diet of the lake chub is varied: zooplankton, insects, aquatic insect larvae, and algae. The largest individuals can capture small fishes. The lake chub itself can be eaten by large predatory fishes and is therefore suitable as bait for fishing.

== Growth ==
In and around Catamaran Brook, New Brunswick, Canada, lake chubs over 5 cm (2.0 in) long were found to grow by about 0.8 cm (0.31 in) a month in summer.

== Reproduction ==
During spawning, male lake chub will pursue females. Spawning-ready males will charge a female which causes her to swim upward, sometimes breaking the water surface. The male swims next to the female, and if multiple males are present, they swim next to one another in order to compete for the female. During this process, the male's mouth will open and close rapidly until the female swims to a rock and the remaining male moves against her until her eggs are released.

Lake chubs normally undergo spawning migrations in early summer. Temperature plays a role in triggering migration onset, as migrations are delayed on colder years. Migrating chubs leave their lakes and rivers to ascend tributary streams, in which they mate (by day or night) and release their eggs over gravel or rocks. There is no parental care. During migration the fish move mostly during dusk and at night.

== Behavior ==
In the laboratory, lake chubs have expressed free-running circadian rhythms that are among the most precise of the few fish species studied to date. These fish are usually diurnal in the laboratory, but in the wild they can be diurnal, crepuscular, or nocturnal.

The lake chub has large optic lobes in its brain and is therefore presumed to be a good sight feeder. It can, however, feed at night also. Comparisons with other freshwater fishes such as stickleback, northern pike, sculpin, and burbot have revealed that it has a superior hearing capacity.

== Common name ==
The lake chub is sometimes called by other names such as northern chub, lake northern chub, chub minnow, plumbeus minnow, or bottlefish. The species is also found in Quebec and its French name is "mené de lac". The lake chub must not be confused with various cisco species of the genus Coregonus living in Lake Michigan, which are often called Michigan Lake chubs.

== Identification ==
=== Subspecies ===
Three distinct subspecies of lake chub have been identified: C. p. plumbeus, C. p. greeni, and one formerly known as C. p. dissimilis. A name is no longer available for C. p. dissimilis.
