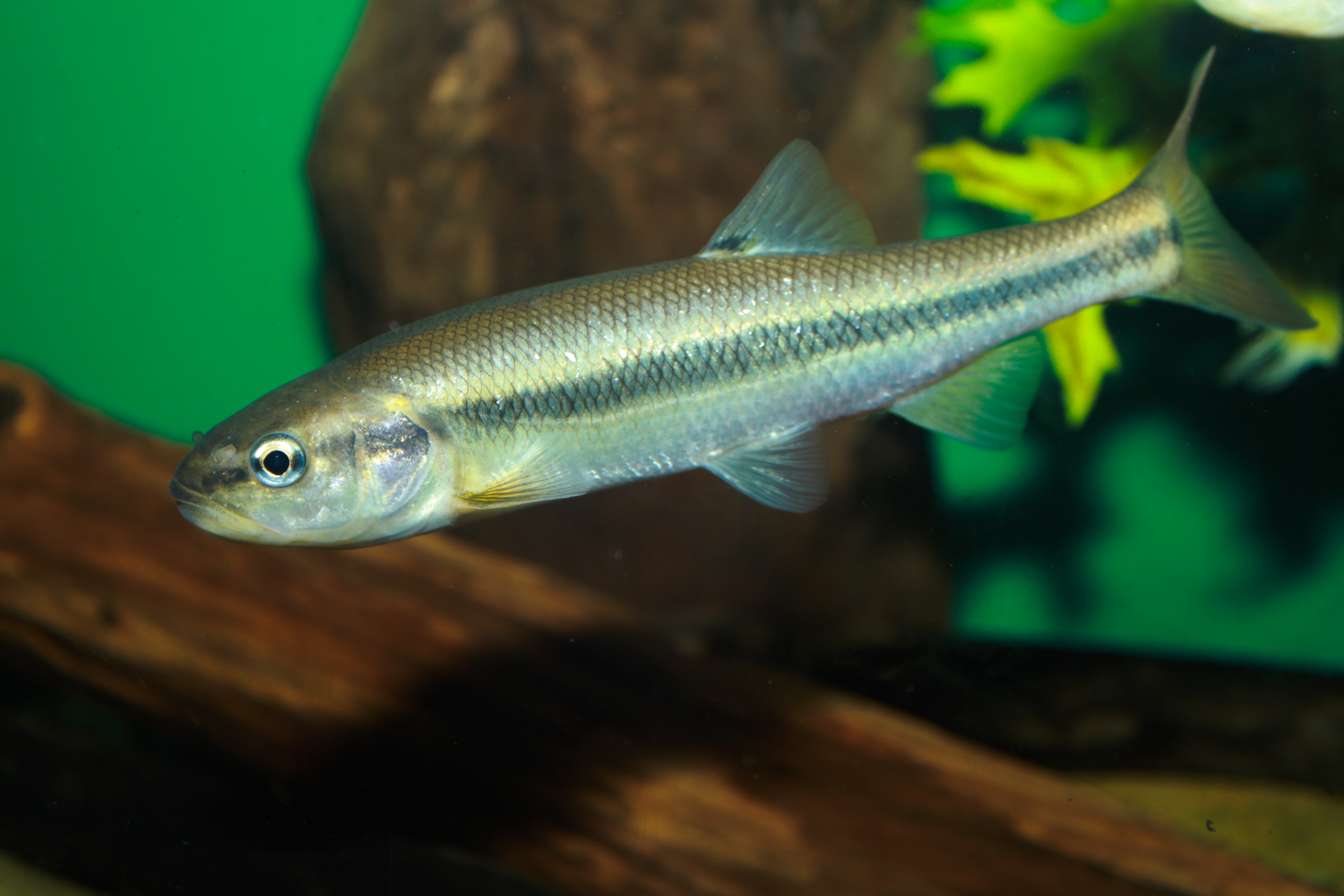

Conservation status
- Least Concern (IUCN 3.1)

- Secure (NatureServe)

Scientific classification
- Kingdom: Animalia
- Phylum: Chordata
- Class: Actinopterygii
- Order: Cypriniformes
- Family: Leuciscidae
- Subfamily: Plagopterinae
- Genus: Semotilus
- Species: S. atromaculatus

Binomial name
- Semotilus atromaculatus (Mitchill, 1818)

Synonyms
- List: Cyprinus atromaculatus Mitchill, 1818; Semotilus atromaculatus atromaculatus (Mitchill, 1818); Semotilus dorsalis Rafinesque, 1820; Semotilus cephalus Rafinesque, 1820; Leuciscus iris Valenciennes, 1844; Leuciscus pulchelloides Ayres, 1850; Leucosomus incrassatus Girard, 1856; Semotilus macrocephalus Girard, 1856; Leucosomus pallidus Girard, 1856; Semotilus speciosus Girard, 1856; Semotilus hammondii Abbott, 1860

= Semotilus atromaculatus =

Species of fish

Semotilus atromaculatus, the creek chub or the common creek chub, is a species of freshwater ray-finned fish belonging to the family Leuciscidae. This species is found in the eastern US and Canada. Differing in size and color depending on origin of development, the creek chub can usually be defined by a dark brown body with a black lateral line spanning horizontally across the body. It lives primarily within streams and rivers. Creek chubs attain lengths of 2–6 inches (5.1–15.2 cm) with larger specimens of up to 12 inches (30 cm) long.

== Distribution and habitat ==
A fish which can withstand many different environments, the creek chub's current range is the eastern two-thirds of the US and southeastern Canada. It can quickly adapt to different extreme environments, and can live on many different foods. Documented to span throughout the Great Lakes surrounding Wisconsin, and into Minnesota, this species has been described as plentiful. However, reports of this species have fallen throughout Wisconsin and the Great Lakes, suggesting a decline in its population in these regions.

Though populations have been declining within the Great Lakes, they have been continually documented throughout small and medium rivers and streams. Thriving in small stream environments, the creek chub gravitates toward areas of weeds to appear secure and avoid predation. Varying in environments containing a multitude of substrates, they have been documented over gravel, sand, silt, rubble, mud, boulders, clay, bedrock and detritus bottoms. This fish actually prefers the stream or river environment compared to that of a lake, as they have been recorded in streams far more than lakes. Of over 440 individuals caught, only 9 were from lakes, and when limiting the locations to solely lakes, only six individuals were caught.

== Description ==
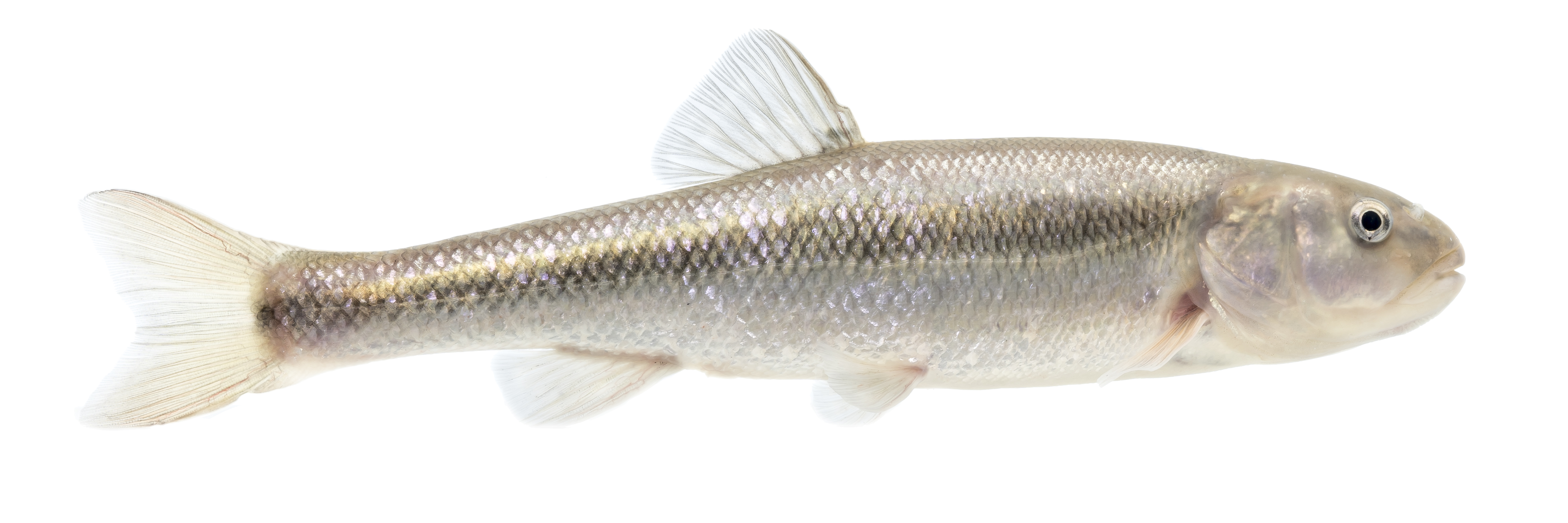
In South Dakota

The creek chub is a small chub with a greenish-brown back, cream-colored sides interrupted by horizontal black stripes running from the nose to the tail, and a white belly. Having a round, cylindrical body with a compressed posterior, males average 125 mm (4.9 in) in length, while females average 105 mm (4.1 in). As the specimen eats what is directly in front of it, the mouth is terminal, large and under the anterior of the eye.

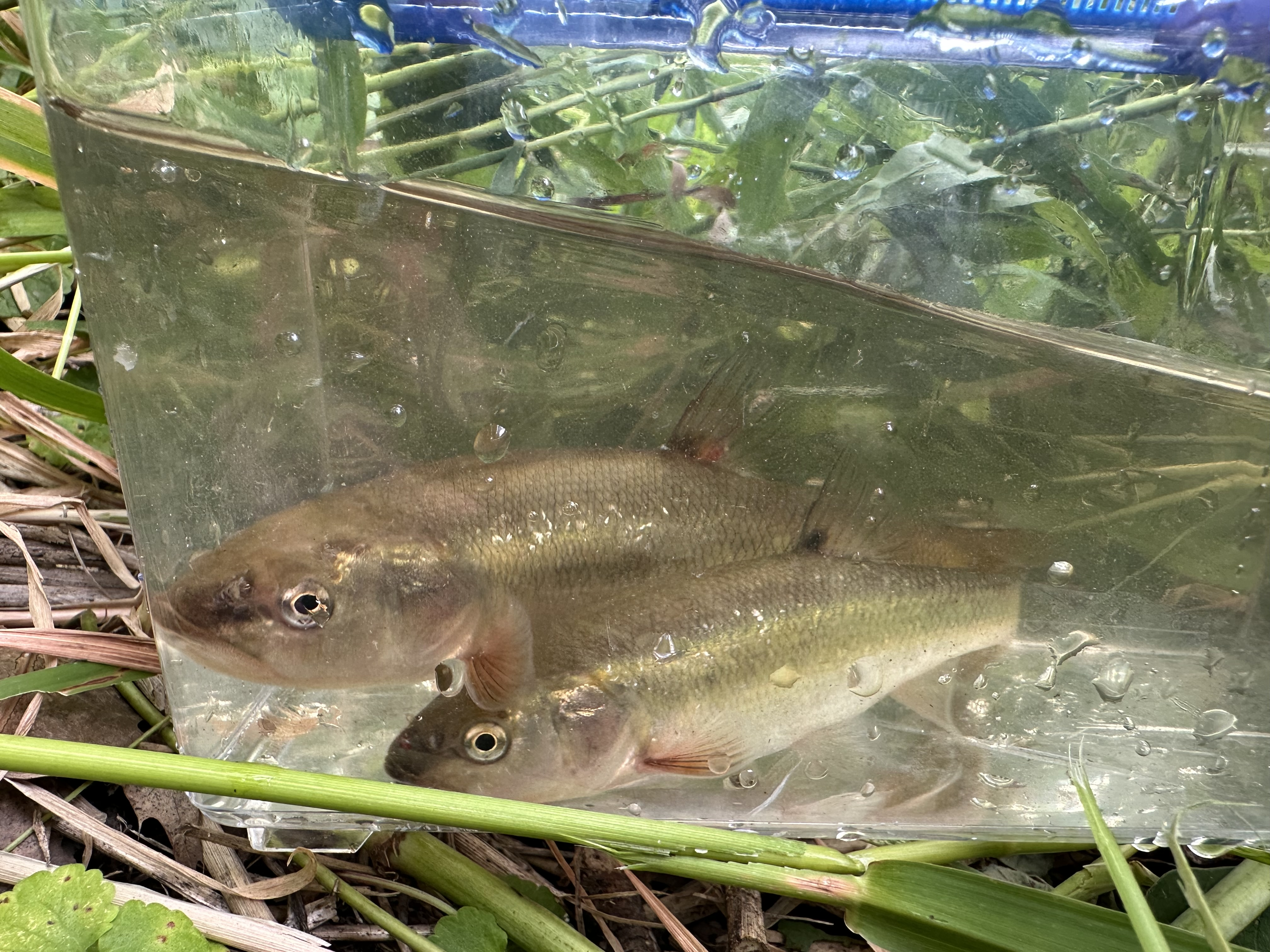
A pair of creek chubs that were caught on a hook and line in a small stream then released. Barrington Illinois area. July 23 2026

The creek chub has been known to slightly differ in coloration, containing black backs with a brown or yellowish middle lines. The average chub ranges in size from 127–178 mm (5.0–7.0 in) in length, with the largest chub documented to be 197 mm (7.8 in) long. They can be identified from other common minnow species by the black "moustache" on their upper lips, along with a black dot on their dorsal fins. Additionally, juvenile males develop a rosy band on their sides, along with glossy, dark dorsal fin spots.

== Biology ==
The scales of this species are quite unique to the needs of the creek chub, ultimately helping to protect and maneuver. Scales do not appear until the fish is 26 mm (1 in) long, leaving 30 mm (1.2 in)-long individuals having small scales with few circuli. Major growth occurs during the first year, often jumping by over 50–70 mm (2.0–2.8 in) in one year. Males grow far more quickly than females, allowing maturity to occur at one to one and a half years of age.

The main scales covering the creek chub are bony-ridge scales; they are thin and flexible to aid movement. Cycloid scales are also found, allowing for smooth transport within the water with little disturbance from the scales themselves. They also have leptoid scales, which are flexible plates of bone which help to protect the fish from predators and act as armor.

== Behavior ==
The creek chub has specific behaviors at different ages. Commonly a school fish, they have been documented to school from birth to late adult, occupying the edges of pools. Their upper lethal temperature is 32 °C (90 °F), while the lower lethal temperature is 1.7 °C (35.1 °F). Initially, the creek chub is quite hesitant to venture from its known territory. For instance, while developing and growing, a school of creek chub travels together within the same 50-metre (160 ft) radius. Ensuring safety from unknown predators and environment, this increases their potential for survival.

As the creek chub develops, traveling outside its radius, it engages in aggressive behavior with other members of the species. The creek chub engages in ritualized aggression when others of the species invade its territory. Engaging in parallel swim, the fish widens its fins and mouth and swims at a caudal beat. Intimidating opponent fish throughout these rituals, the forward fish stops and directs blows to the head of the other fish. This ensures territory dominance, forcing intruders out of its area.

In central Ohio, creek chubs tend to dominate small creeks, where predators such as smallmouth, largemouth, and spotted bass are unable to thrive. They will be present in larger creeks and rivers, but they will no longer be a dominant species, and their population numbers will suffer from predation. Creek chubs can be caught on small hooks with small sections of nightcrawlers. They feed in schools during daylight, and aggressively compete for the bait at first. After several of their comrades are pulled from the water, creek chubs become wary, and they will no longer aggressively take the bait. At this point, they may nibble at the bait, or look at the bait and avoid striking at it. Creek chubs can be effectively caught in minnow traps with dry dog food. More information is needed about effective daytime angling hours. Creek chubs are a hardy minnow that can easily be caught in small creeks, stored in aquariums, and used as bait to catch larger fish such as bass and catfish. Since creek chubs do not have sharp spines that make up their dorsal fins, like a bluegill or largemouth bass does, they may be a preferred food source for fish that prey on smaller fish.

== Diet ==
The creek chub is described as an opportunist and a carnivore, and consumes many different foods to survive, including fish, insect remains and vegetation, amphipods, adult Coleoptera, Ephemeroptera nymphs, Odonata larvae and Diptera adults and larvae.

Feeding habits are specific to the creeks and rivers where in the chub exists. As a juvenile, it actively feeds throughout the early morning on organisms within the water. Fish often do not leave their shelter until temperatures have increased to a daily maximum. Large chubs actively forage for 1–2 hr, then wait in their environment to feed on drift items.

== Reproduction ==
Males increase reproductive success by migrating to a spawning area. The male then initiates building a spawning site to draw in females in the surrounding area. This most likely occurs in small pits with small pebbles to protect the area where eggs are laid. Once females enter, the male wraps around her pectoral fin and body, fertilization occurs, and the female leaves. Around 25–30 eggs are released each fertilization cycle. Often, these reproductive cycles occur in communal nesting sites, where the male controls the territory and protects it from intruders.

During the breeding season, males grow small, keratin-based bumps, called nuptial tubercles, on their head, which are used in ritualized combat. This hardly ever gets dangerous or destructive, but it is used to ward off intruding males on communal nesting sites.

== Predation and management ==
The creek chub is often preyed on by species ranging from birds to fish, such as loons, kingfishers, brown trout, northern pike and smallmouth bass. Viruses infecting the creek chub have been documented to decrease this species' population. Additionally, the food supply of the creek chub is limited by other animals, such as trout and other chubs.

Managing creek chub has been recorded to work in small growing ponds. Providing the right conditions, with flowing water through the pond, gives the chub the necessary environment to survive.
