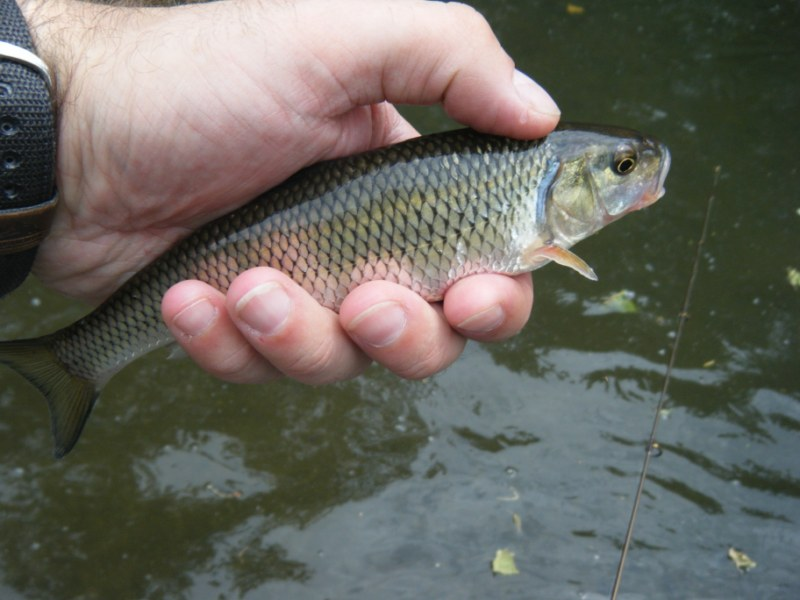
- Fallfish (Semotilus corporalis)

Scientific classification
- Domain: Eukaryota
- Kingdom: Animalia
- Phylum: Chordata
- Class: Actinopterygii
- Order: Cypriniformes
- Family: Leuciscidae
- Subfamily: Plagopterinae
- Genus: Semotilus; Rafinesque, 1820

Type species
- Semotilus dorsalis Rafinesque, 1820

Synonyms
- Cheilonemus Storer, 1855; Chilonemus Baird, 1851

= Semotilus =

Genus of fishes

Semotilus is the genus of creek chubs, ray-finned fish in the family Leuciscidae. The term "creek chub" is sometimes used for individual species, particularly the common creek chub, S. atromaculatus. The creek chub species of minnows can grow from 6 to 10 inches (15 to 25 cm). They can be found in the United States and Canada in any small stream or creek. They hide under small rocks for protection. They have a small black spot on the dorsal fin for easy identification.

== Species ==
- Semotilus atromaculatus (Mitchill, 1818) (common creek chub)
- Semotilus corporalis (Mitchill, 1817) (fallfish)
- Semotilus lumbee Snelson & Suttkus, 1978 (Sandhills chub)
- Semotilus thoreauianus D. S. Jordan, 1877 (Dixie chub)

== Fishing ==
Members of genus Semotilus readily take all sorts of natural and artificial bait. They can grow quite large, Fallfish and Creek Chub especially, putting up a good fight on ultralight tackle.
