= Small pondweed =

Small pondweed is a common name for several plants and may refer to:

- Potamogeton berchtoldii
- Potamogeton pusillus
