= Ulysses Orange Cox =

American biologist and educator

Ulysses Orange Cox (September 20, 1864 – August 25, 1920) was an American biologist, naturalist and educator.

Ulysses Orange Cox was born on September 20, 1864, on a farm in Farmland in Randolph County, Indiana. As a boy he developed an interest in natural history and his first publication was A List of the Birds of Randolph County, Ind. in 1893 in the Ornithologist and Oologist. While still in his teens he began teaching in county schools in Randolph County. He organized the High School in Farmland, his home town and was its superintendent.

He attended Bryant's Commercial School in Indianapolis, graduating in 1884. The following year he went to the Central Normal College for teacher training, as well as enrolling in the Indiana State Normal School, graduating from there in 1889. He taught at Farmland High School and assisted in the Spring term at the Indiana Normal School he gained the position of head of General Science at the State Normal School at Mankato, Minnesota. After two years he left teaching to attenda Indiana University Bloomington, graduating in 1900 with a Bachelor of Arts in Zoology, gaining a Master of Arts in 1902.

In 1905 he was appointed as the Head of the Biology Department at Indiana State Normal School by William Wood Parsons, at the suggestion of Barton Warren Evermann, where he remained until his death in 1920. Cox was a general naturalist with interests in both zoology and botany. He took part in expeditions, conducted research for the United States Fish Commission. He wrote A Revision Of The Cave Fishes Of North America, A Syllabus Of Elementary Physiology: With References And Laboratory Exercises and A Report Upon the Fishes of Southwestern Minnesota.
