= Pierre Louis Jouy =

American ornithologist, naturalist and ethnographer

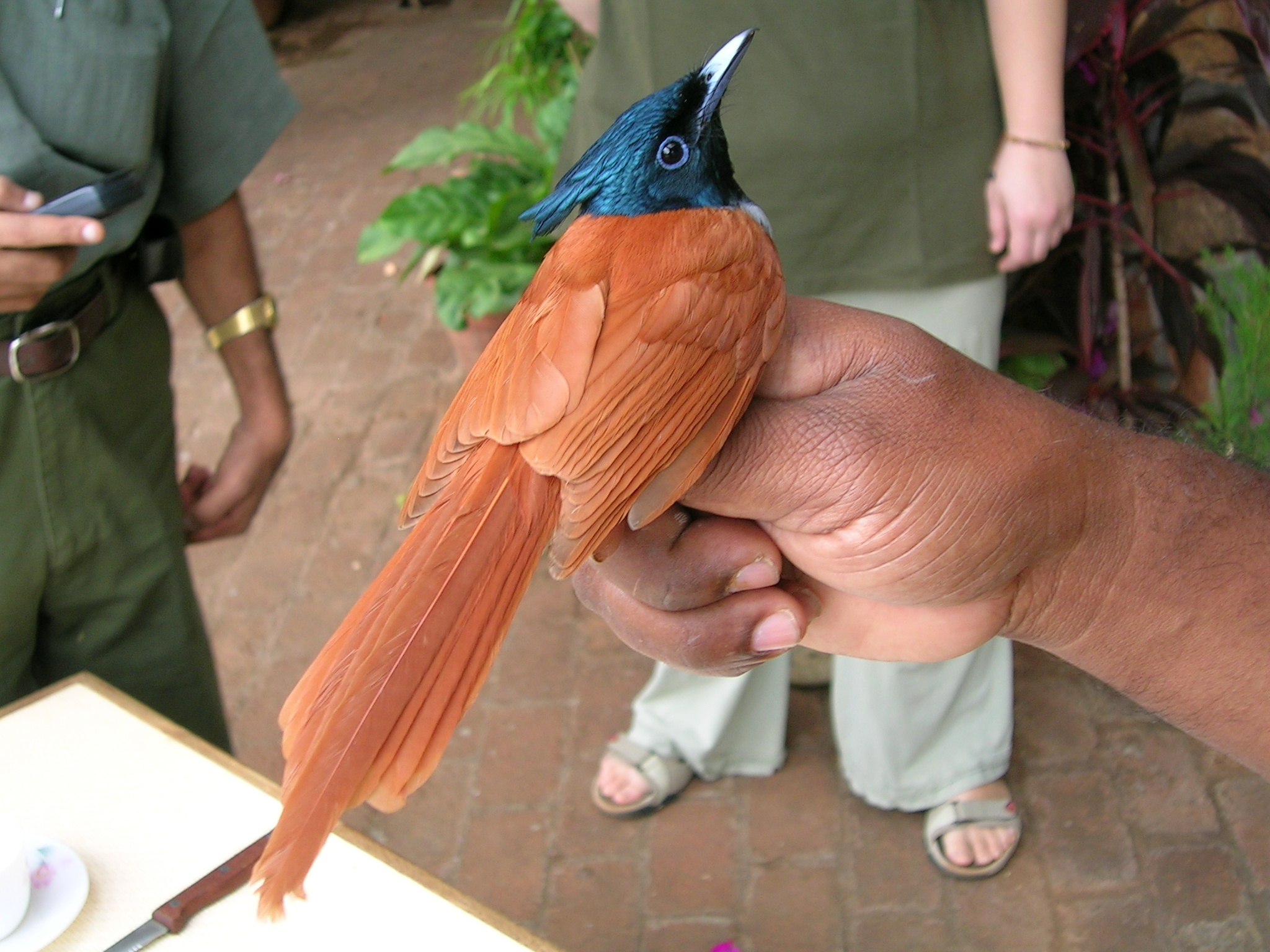
a member of the paradise flycatcher genus

Pierre Louis Jouy (February 8, 1856, New York City – March 22, 1894, Tucson, Arizona) was an American ornithologist, naturalist, and ethnographer. He was the first American ornithologist to study the birds of Korea and, during his lifetime, became known as one of the USA's leading experts on Korea. Jouy's observations of paradise flycatchers (genus Terpsiphone ) are particularly noteworthy.

== Biography ==
Pierre Louis Jouy in his boyhood became interested in natural history and, especially, ornithology. From the age of 7, he lived with his family in the neighborhood of Washington Circle. Spencer Fullerton Baird, with Robert Ridgway and Thomas Mayo Brewer, published in 1874 A History Of North American Birds. Land Birds — the first of 3 volumes on North American birds. Smithsonian records indicate than Jouy and other teenagers may have helped to compile information for that 1874 book. In 1877 Jouy published a catalogue of the birds of the District of Columbia, and local bookstores sold the catalogue for 10 cents per copy. He studied under Baird at the United States National Museum (now named the Smithsonian Institution) and became an expert on birds in the Washington D.C. area.

In June 1879, Jouy, employed at the U.S. National Museum, married Alice Elizabeth Craig, a twenty-six-year-old, local schoolteacher. In mid-1880, she gave birth to a daughter, but birth complications caused death for both mother and baby. Supervisors and friends at the U.S. National Museum believed that a change of location and new career challenges might help Pierre Jouy to overcome grief. Under the auspices of the U.S. National Museum, he traveled in 1881 to China and Japan to collect zoological and ethnographic specimens. In 1880 a "telegraphic longitude" mission was organized and assigned to U.S. Navy Lieutenant-commander Francis Matthews Green, an expert in telegraphy-based longitude measurement. Aboard the USS Palos under the command of Green, Pierre Jouy, assisted in research by the ship's surgeon Frank C. Dale, was fairly successful in specimen collection in China and Japan during his time with the Palos. From April 1881 to June 1882, Jouy was with the Palos but became dissatisfied with the U.S. Navy mission having priority over his scientific work and wanted to return to Japan. In May 1882 a U.S.-Korea treaty was signed at Incheon. Jouy, having returned to Yokohama, spent almost two years as a U.S. National Museum employee in Japan, assisted by A. J. M. Smith, who was fluent in Japanese. In December 1882, Jouy filed a forty-five-page report documenting his collection of specimens in zoology and ethnography. He completed his work in Japan toward the end of April 1883. His field notes from Japan described many naturalist subjects, including trees, fish, and mammals.

In mid-April 1883 at Yokohama, Jouy greeted Lucius Foote, head of the U.S. diplomatic mission to Korea. Jouy managed to attach himself to the U.S. diplomatic legation to Korea, but he was no longer funded by the U.S. National Museum. The diplomatic legation voyaged from Nagasaki aboard the USS Monocacy and arrived in May 1883 in Seoul, where they were warmly welcomed. Jouy's first Korean ornithological specimen (May 28, 1883, Incheon) was a Phylloscopus borealis (arctic warbler), now a rare species in Korea. Near Seoul, he collected extensively. In November 1883, with the aid of a royal Korean internal-travel passport, Jouy and a companion, Marinus Willett (born 1858 in New York), became the first two Americans to make a Seoul-to-Busan overland trip. In Busan, Jouy obtained a salaried position at the new Joseon customs service. Jouy collected hundreds of bird specimens in Korea. Some of the specimens remain valuable in historical biogeography. Jouy’s short-tailed albatross specimen (June 1885, Korea Strait off Busan) belongs to a now-rare species and, as of the year 2020, is the only specimen of this species ever collected in Korea. A specimen of Chinese egret (Egretta eulophotes) (April 1886, North Kyŏngsang) has considerable biogeographical importance. He collected Korean pottery and described the potter's wheel commonly used in Korea. In Korea he photographed landscapes, houses, and people. In Korea, Jouy collected "plant, bird, fish, reptile, crustacean, insect, chipmunk, mouse, fish, and rock specimens."

Jouy spent a little over three years from 1883 to 1886 in Korea. His activities and whereabouts from July to December 1886 are uncertain, but he probably spent these months mostly in Japan. By November 1886 he had returned to Yokohama and from there he shipped, to the U.S. National Museum, five cases containing rocks, mineral specimens, and other objects. He briefly returned in December 1886 to Busan for one more collection effort. By early 1887, he had returned to Washington, D.C. There he found himself in demand for his knowledge of Korea. Many journalists, academics, and other influential Washingtonians wanted to talk to him about Korea. In July 1888, Pierre Jouy married Marion Stuart Forsyth Antisell (1864-1908), an employee of the U.S. National Museum and a native of Washington, D.C. Her father was the noted scientist Thomas Antisell. In 1889 Pierre Louy was employed in the U.S. National Museum's the Department of Mollusks. He suffered from tuberculosis for several years. He and his wife Marion moved to Arizona for a warmer and drier climate. Jouy continued fieldwork, assisted by his wife, in Arizona and Mexico. He made in early 1891 an expedition to Guaymas, a port city on the Sea of Cortez, and, later in 1891, to other parts of Mexico. In 1892 in Mexico, near Lake Chapala, he collected pottery and biological specimens with “an especially excellent series of vampire bats". In mid-1893 his health worsened and his research ended completely. He died from tuberculosis in Arizona in March 1894 at the age of 38. He was buried in Oak Hill Cemetery in Washington, D.C.

In honor of Jouy, Leonhard Hess Stejneger gave in 1887 the scientific name Columba jouy to the Ryukyu wood pigeon — however, this species became extinct in the early 1900s.

== Selected publications ==
- Jordan, David Starr; Jouy, Pierre L. (1881). "Check-list of duplicates of fishes from the Pacific coast of North America, distributed by the Smithsonian Institution in behalf of the United States National Museum, 1881" (PDF). Proceedings of the United States National Museum.
- Jouy, P. L. (January 1881). "Description of a new species of Squalius (Squalius aliciae), from Utah Lake" (PDF). Proceedings of the United States National Museum. IV. U. S. Government Printing Office: 19. Proceedings of the United States National Museum for 1881
- Jouy, Pierre Louis (December 13, 1883). "Ornithological notes on collections made in Japan from June to December, 1882" (PDF). Proceedings of the United States National Museum. VI (18): 273–318.
- Jouy, P. L. (1888). "On cormorant fishing in Japan". The American Naturalist. 22 (253): 1–3. Bibcode:1888ANat...22....1J. doi:10.1086/274626. S2CID 85172875.
- Jouy, Pierre Louis (1894). Notes on birds of central Mexico, with descriptions of forms believed to be new. Vol. 16. US Government Printing Office.
- Jouy, Pierre Louis (1910). "The Paradise Flycatchers of Japan and Korea". Proceedings of the United States National Museum. XXXVII (1721). U. S. Government Printing Office: 651–655. doi:10.5479/si.00963801.1721.651.
