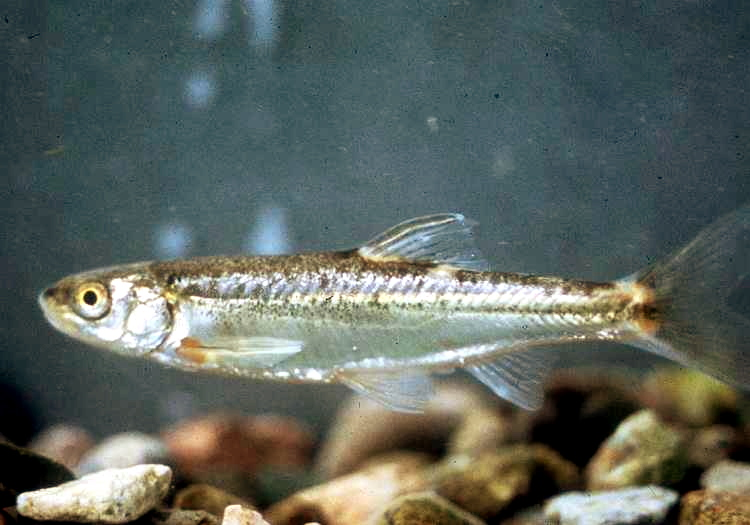
- Spikedace, Meda fulgida

Conservation status
- Endangered (IUCN 3.1)

- Imperiled (NatureServe)

Scientific classification
- Kingdom: Animalia
- Phylum: Chordata
- Class: Actinopterygii
- Order: Cypriniformes
- Family: Leuciscidae
- Subfamily: Plagopterinae
- Genus: Meda; Girard, 1856
- Species: M. fulgida

Binomial name
- Meda fulgida Girard, 1856

= Spikedace =

Species of fish

The spikedace (Meda fulgida) is an endangered species of ray-finned fish in the family Leuciscidae. It is found in Arizona and New Mexico in the United States. It lives in fast-moving streams.

== Description ==
The maximum length of the spikedace rarely exceeds 7.5 cm (3 in). It usually has a slender body, with a somewhat compressed front, and is strongly compressed at the caudal peduncle, with a fairly pointed snout and contains a slightly subterminal mouth with large eyes. The dorsal fin origin is behind the pelvic fin origin. The scales are present only as small, deeply embedded plates. The first spinous ray of the dorsal fin is the strongest and most sharp-pointed. The spikedace has seven dorsal fin-rays and typically 9 anal fin-rays. The spikedace skin is olive-gray to light brown above, with a brilliant silver side, often with blue reflections, and with black specks and blotches on the back and upper side. The breeding male has a spectacular, bright, brassy yellow head and fins.

== Range ==
Historically, M. fulgida was common and locally abundant throughout the upper Gila River basin of Arizona and New Mexico. In Arizona, this included the Agua Fria, San Pedro, and San Francisco River systems, and the Gila, Salt and Verde Rivers and major tributaries upstream of present-day Phoenix. In New Mexico, it included San Francisco River, Gila River, and the East, Middle and West Forks of the Gila.

Presently, the species is found in Aravaipa Creek, a tributary of the San Pedro River, Eagle Creek, and the upper Verde River system in Arizona, and the upper Gila River system in New Mexico.

== Habitat ==
The spikedace occupies midwater habitats of runs and pools, and prefers moving in water less than 1 m (3 ft) deep and in a current of 0.3–0.6 m/s (0.67–1.34 mph). The spikedace concentrates in the downstream ends of rivers, although many have been collected in the upstream portions of shear zones less than 0.33 m (1 ft) deep. In larger streams, the spikedace is found only at the mouth of creeks.

== Population trends ==
The spikedace was formerly widespread in the Gila basin, but has suffered marked reductions in range in the last few decades. In areas where it still persists, it seems far less abundant now. This species often declines and explodes in numbers. Kirk Young (AGFD Native Fish Diversity Review 1995) reported four populations in Arizona. Paul Marsh believes a population may be found in the White River which has not yet been surveyed.

== Management factors ==
Activities known to be detrimental to the spikedace are the removal of water from their habitats, stream impoundment, channelization, domestic livestock grazing, timber harvesting, mining, road construction, polluting, and stocking non-native species.

Threats to the species include stream flow depletion; diversion; habitat alteration and competition with non-native crayfishes; and predation by and competition with non-native fishes, especially red shiner.
