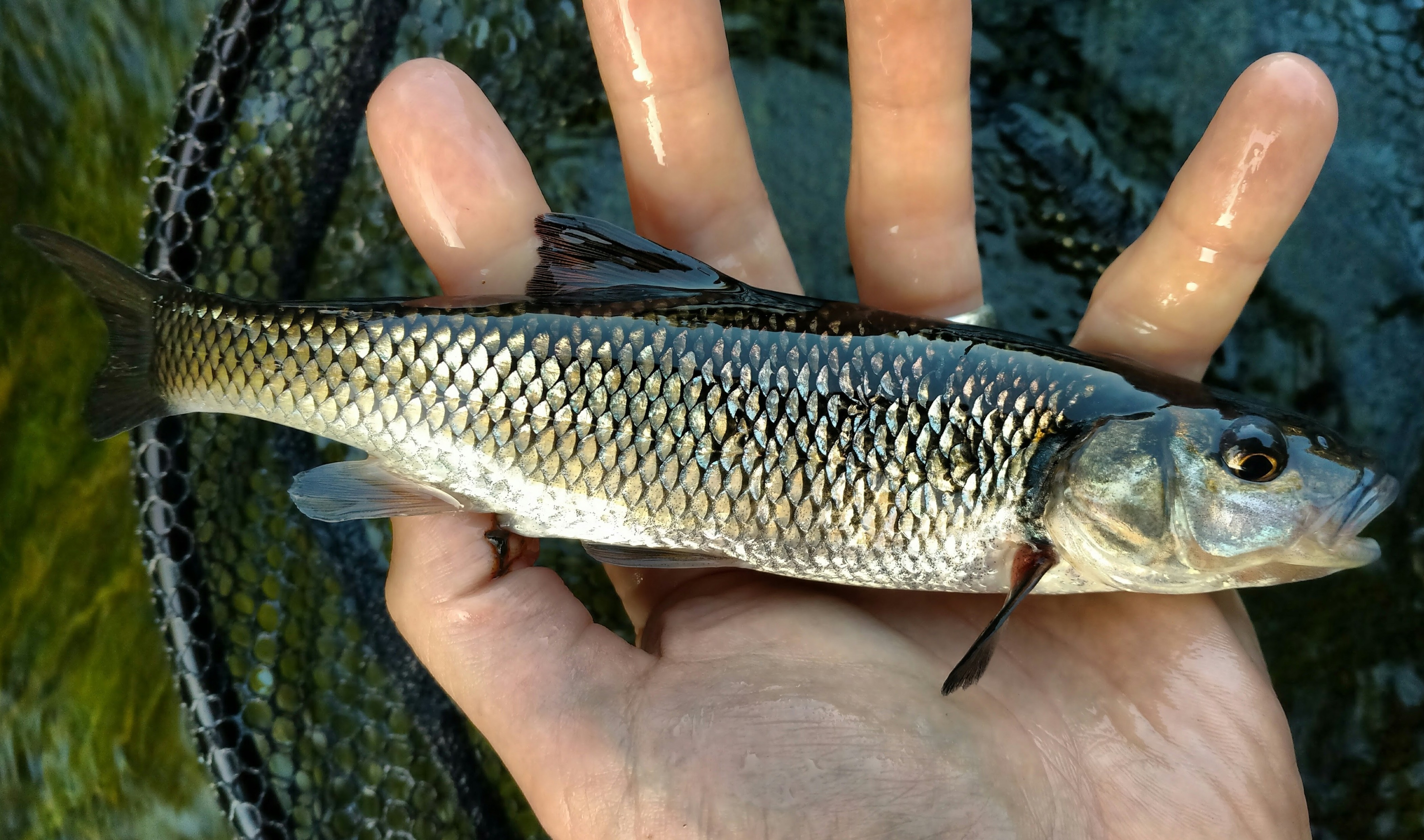
- Semotilus corporalis

Scientific classification
- Domain: Eukaryota
- Kingdom: Animalia
- Phylum: Chordata
- Class: Actinopterygii
- Order: Cypriniformes
- Family: Leuciscidae
- Subfamily: Plagopterinae; Cope, 1874

Genera
- See text

= Plagopterinae =

Subfamily of fishes

Plagopterinae is a subfamily of the freshwater fish family Leuciscidae, which contains the true minnows. Members of this family are known as creek chubs or the creek chub-plagopterin (CC-P) clade of minnows. All members of this family are found in North America, and it includes among the northernmost-distributed of all North American minnows, the lake chub.

== Genera ==
- Couesius D. S. Jordan, 1878 (lake chub)
- Hemitremia Cope, 1870 (flame chub)
- Lepidomeda Cope, 1874 (spinedaces)
- Margariscus Cockerell, 1909 (pearl daces)
- Meda Girard, 1856 (spikedace)
- Plagopterus Cope, 1874 (woundfin)
- Semotilus Rafinesque, 1820 (creek chubs)
