= Storm Area 51 =

2019 Facebook event and Internet meme

Coordinates: 37.5941°N 115.8988°W

- Part of Area 51 conspiracy theories
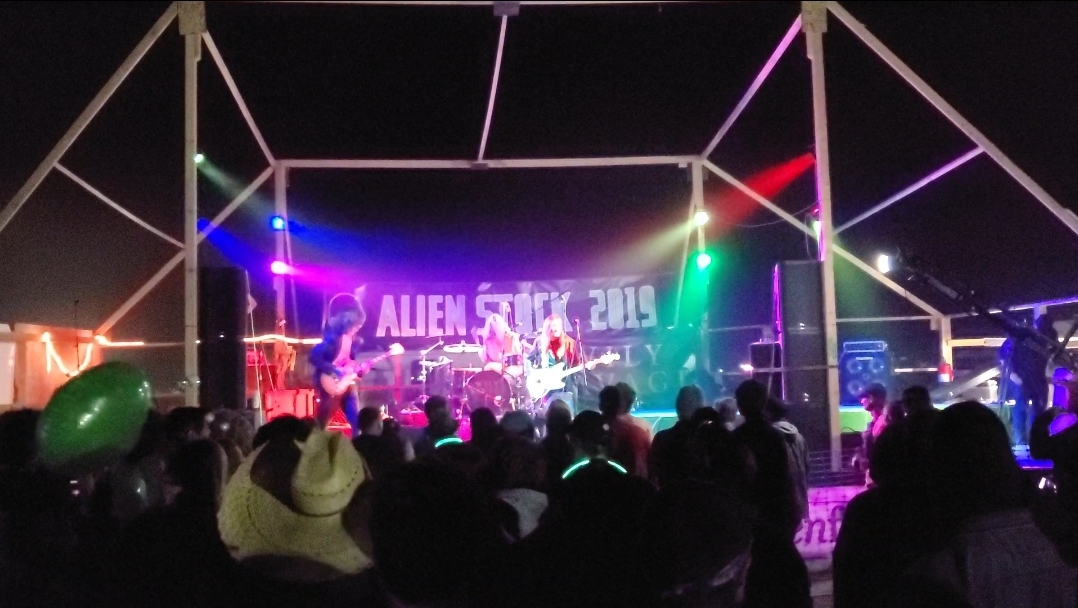
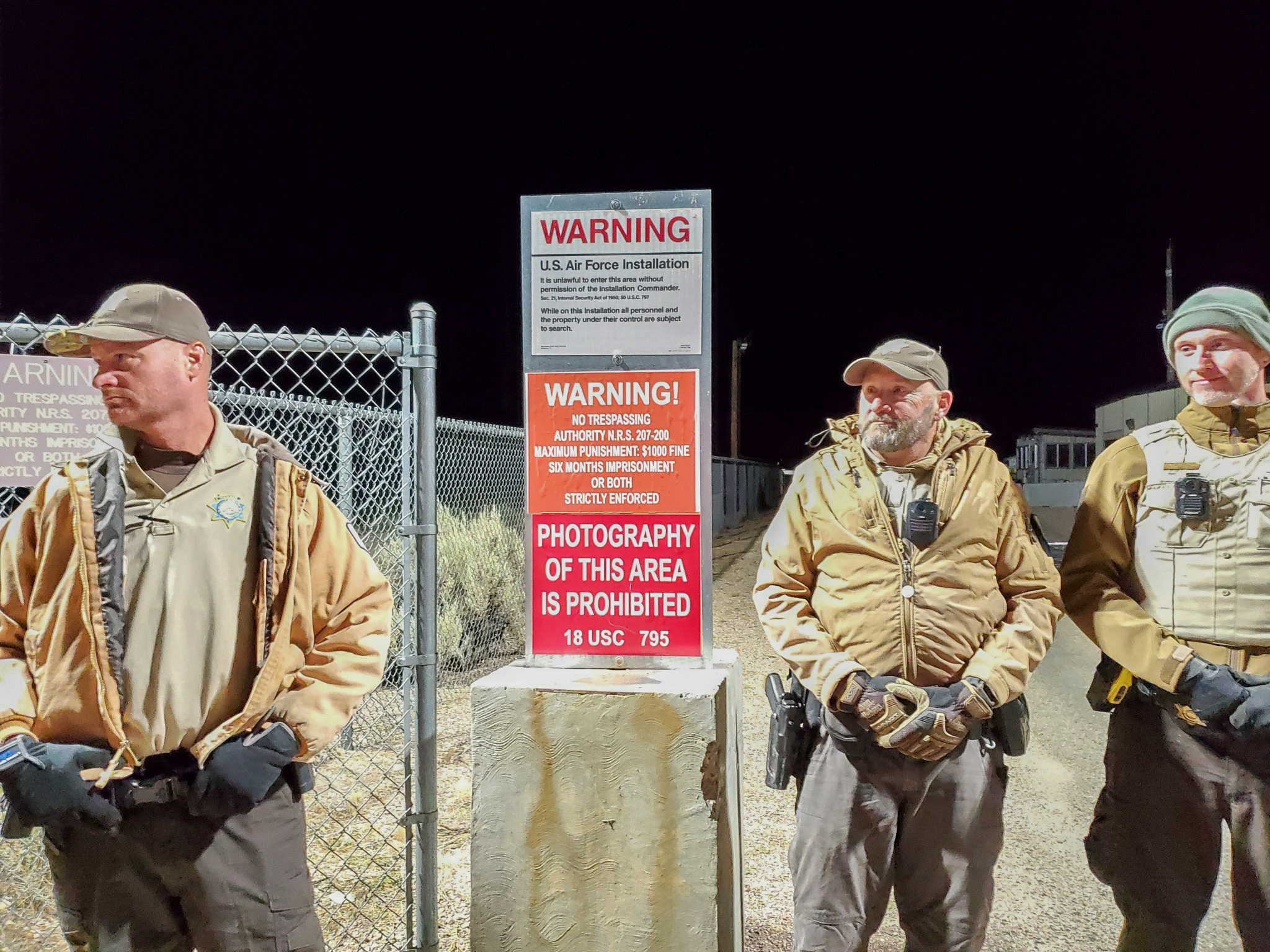
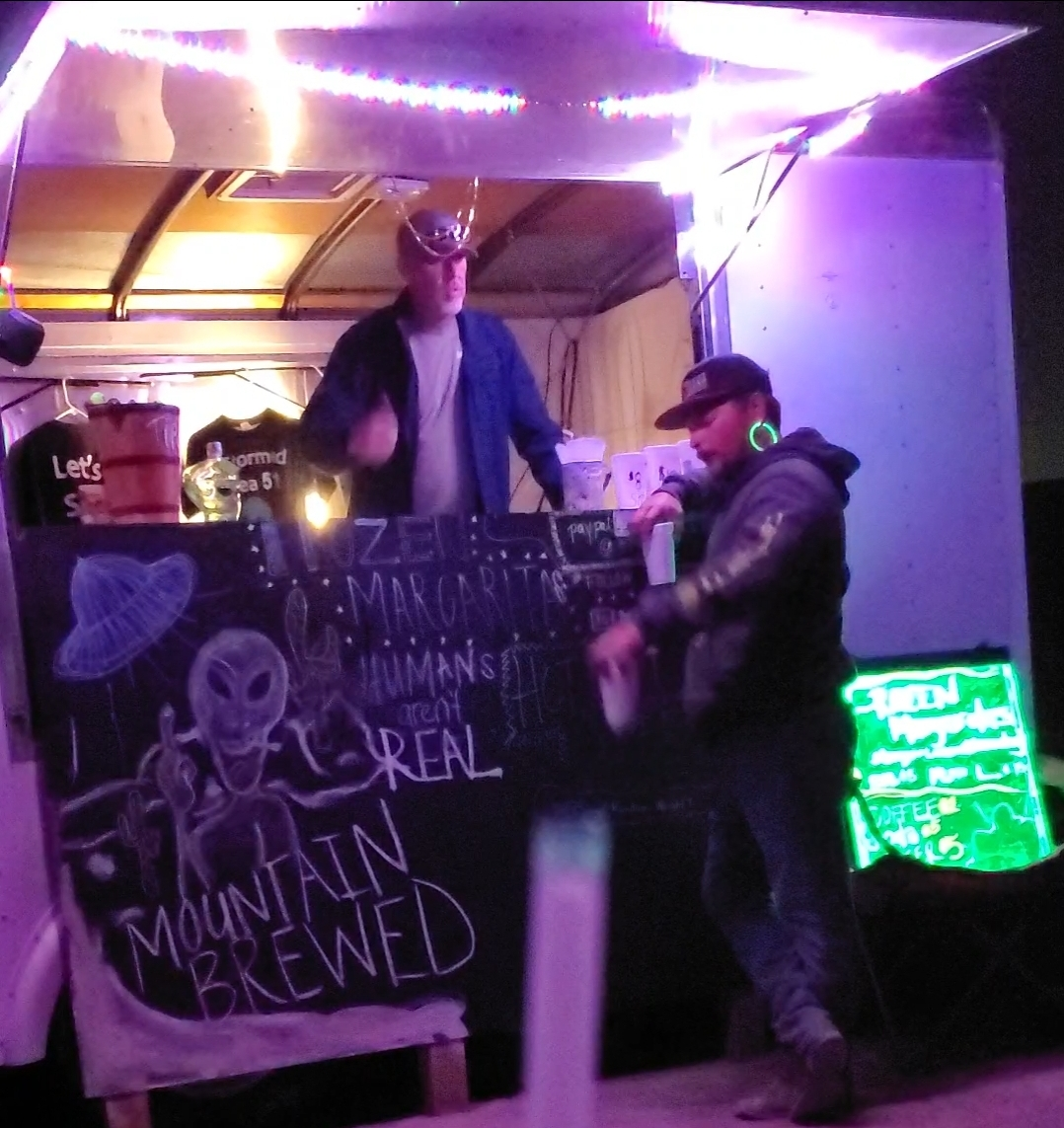
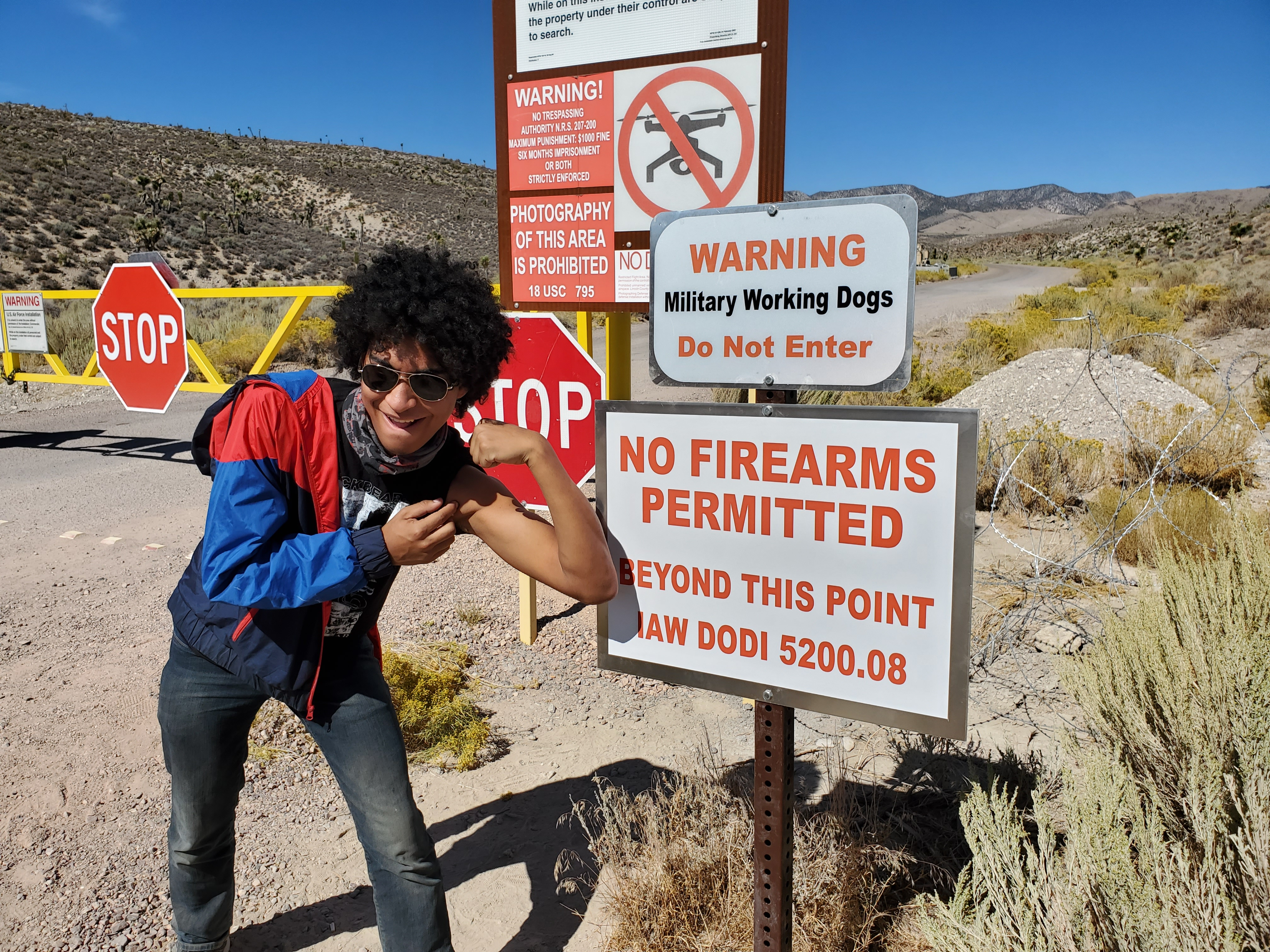
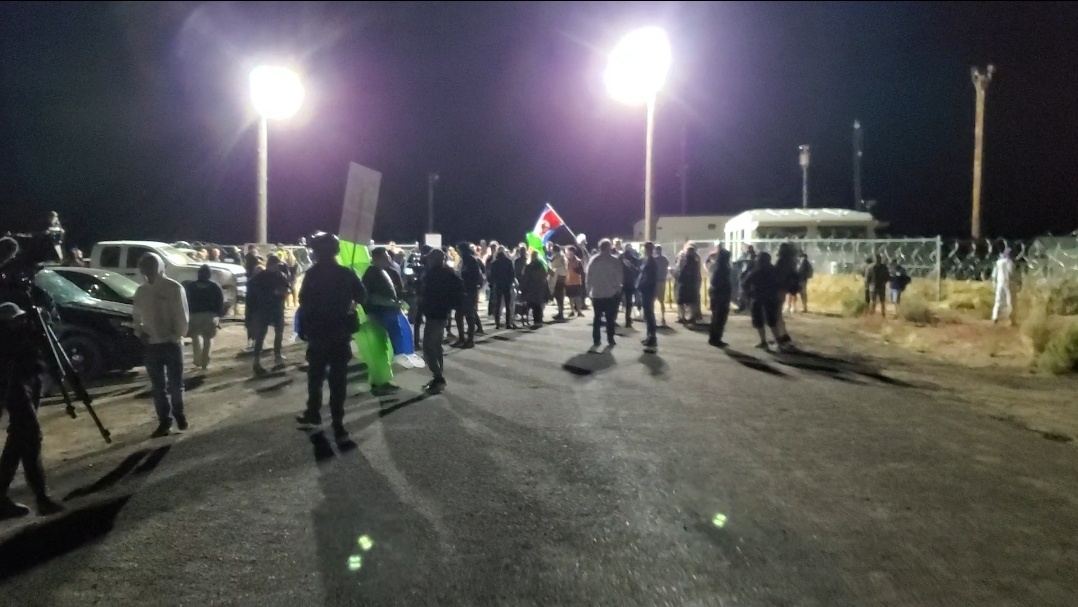
- Clockwise from top: Alienstock 2019; Alamo residents sell margaritas to Alienstock attendees; Crowd gathered at the back gate of Area 51 on the night of the 20th; An attendee of the Storming poses in front of Area 51's main gate; Lincoln County Deputies stand guard at the back gate to Area 51
- Date: September 17–21, 2019 (7 years ago)
- Duration: Approximately 96 hours
- Venue: Little A'Le'Inn (Rachel); Basecamp (Hiko)
- Location: Lincoln County, Nevada, United States
- Also known as: Area 51 Raid
- Type: Music festival
- Theme: Ufology
- Cause: Facebook event
- Motive: Playing along with a joke, Internet fame, genuine ufology enthusiasm
- Participants: 150 (main event); 1,500 (festivals)
- Deaths: 0
- Injuries: 2 (rollover crash near Rachel)
- Arrests: 7

Storm Area 51, They Can't Stop All of Us was an American Facebook event that took place on and around September 20, 2019, in the desert surrounding Area 51, a highly-classified United States Air Force (USAF) facility within the Nevada Test and Training Range.

The event, created as a sardonic shitpost by Matty Roberts on June 27, 2019, asked Facebook users to band together and raid the site in a search for extraterrestrial life that conspiracy-theory lore claims may be concealed inside. More than 2 million people responded "going" and 1.5 million "interested" on the event's page, which subsequently attracted widespread media attention and caused the event to become an Internet meme. Roberts later stated his intentions for the event had been purely comedic, and disavowed responsibility for any casualties had there been any actual attempt to raid the military base.

On the day of the event, only about 150 people were reported to have shown up at the two entrances to Area 51, with none succeeding in entering the site. Two music festivals were planned to coincide with the event: Alienstock in Rachel, Nevada, and Storm Area 51 Basecamp in Hiko, Nevada. An estimated 1,500 people attended these festivals, according to state and local law enforcement. Air Force spokeswoman Grace Manock stated government officials were briefed on the event and discouraged people from attempting to enter military property. Nevada law enforcement also warned potential participants against trespassing. The event had an effect on businesses both locally in Nevada and around the United States, which prepared products for visitors and those attending the event.

== Background ==
Area 51 is a common name given to a United States Air Force (USAF) facility in the Nevada Test and Training Range. Opening in 1955, the facility functioned as an aircraft testing and development facility during the Cold War. The facility is kept highly classified, protected from unauthorized entry by warning signs, electronic surveillance and armed guards. The CIA declassified documents related to Area 51 and recognized its existence in 2013. Area 51's intense secrecy has caused it to become the subject of many conspiracy theories regarding the presence of aliens on the site. These began in the 1950s, when some individuals reported seeing UFOs at the location of the base. Conspiracy theorists believe aliens, UFOs, or information related to them are stored at Area 51.

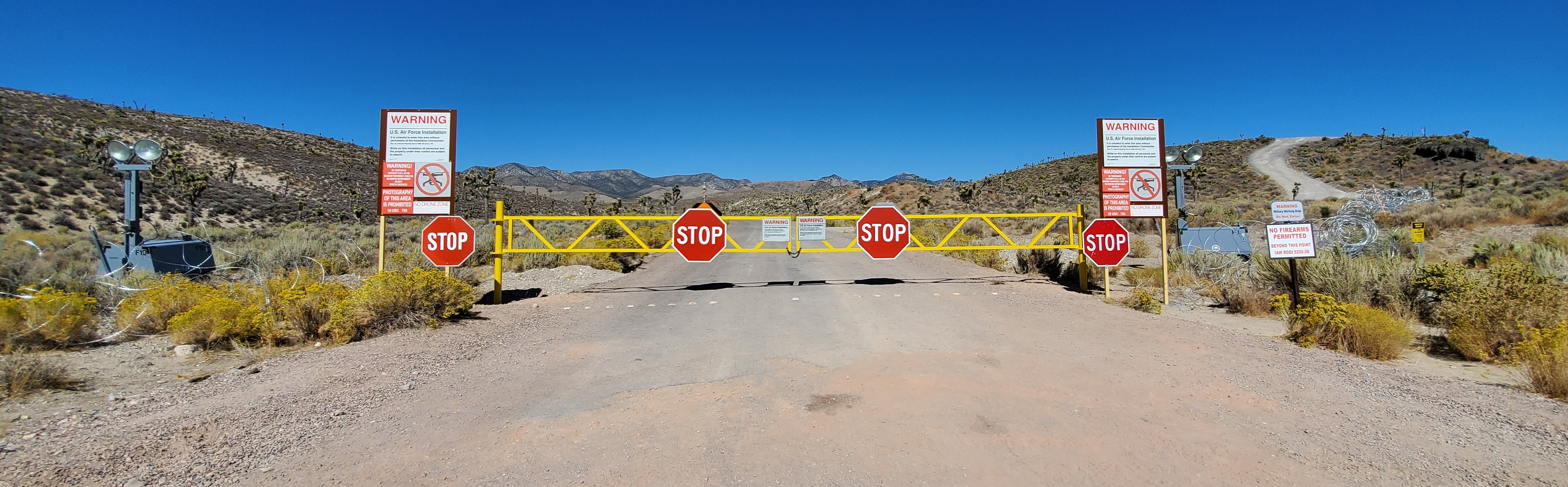
The main gate of the Nevada Test and Training Range, colloquially known as Area 51

== Facebook event and Internet meme ==
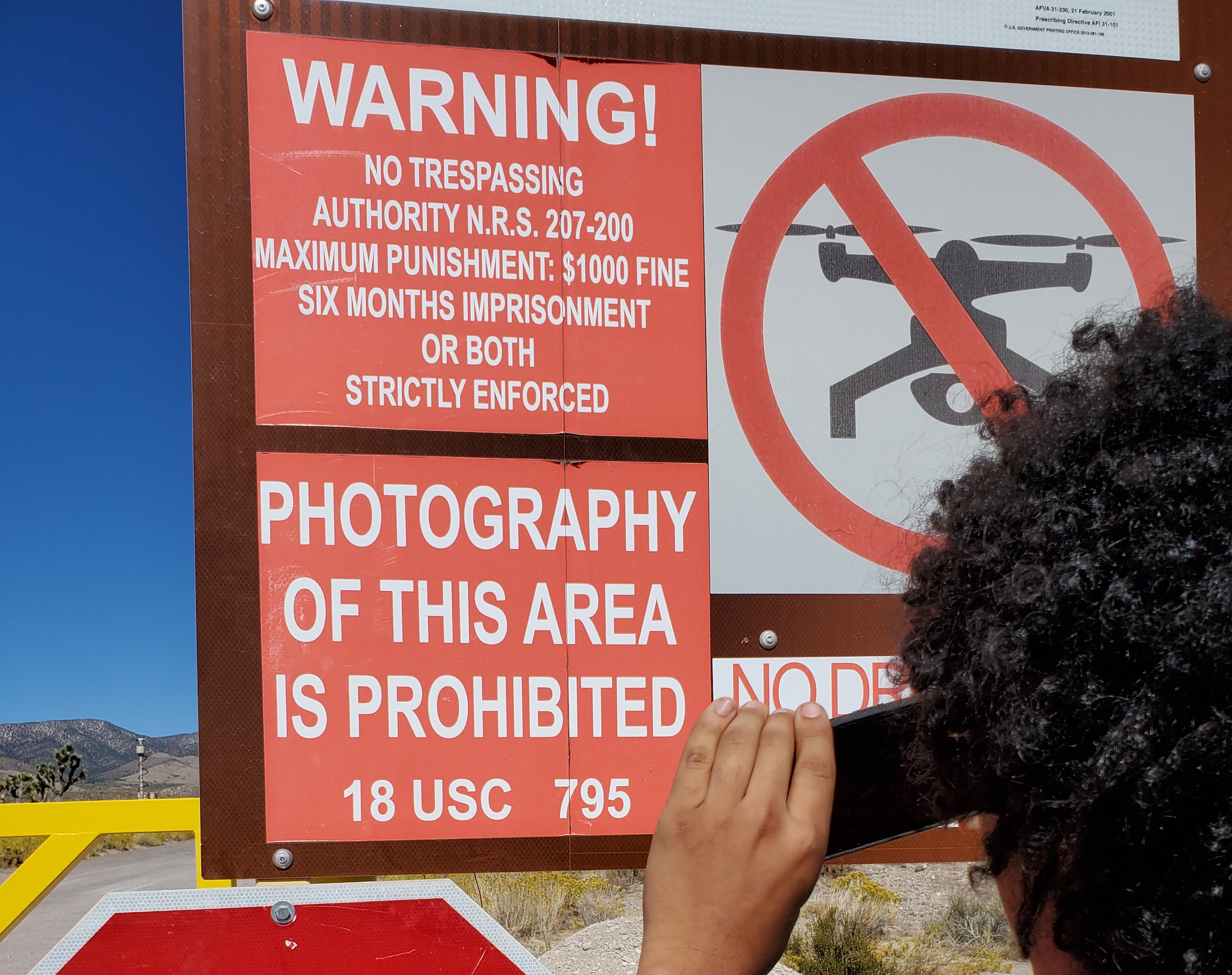
Attendee taking a photograph of a sign at the main gate of Area 51

Matty Roberts, a resident of Bakersfield and a retail clerk at a vape kiosk in Valley Plaza Mall, was a moderator of the Facebook page Shitposting cause I'm in shambles. "Shitposting" is the act of posting content online with intentionally ironic or poor quality. Matty devised the idea of creating the Storm Area 51 event after watching Area 51 conspiracy theorist Bob Lazar and filmmaker Jeremy Corbell on The Joe Rogan Experience podcast on June 20, 2019. He created the event on Facebook on June 27, 2019.

The event was planned to take place in Amargosa Valley from 3 a.m. to 6 a.m. PDT on September 20, 2019. The Facebook event wrote, "If we naruto run, we can move faster than their bullets. Lets see them aliens [sic]", referring to the distinctive running style of anime character Naruto Uzumaki and several other characters, who run with their arms stretched behind them, head down and torso tilted forward. Roberts stated the event had only received around 40 responses three days into the event's listing, before it suddenly and unexpectedly went viral.

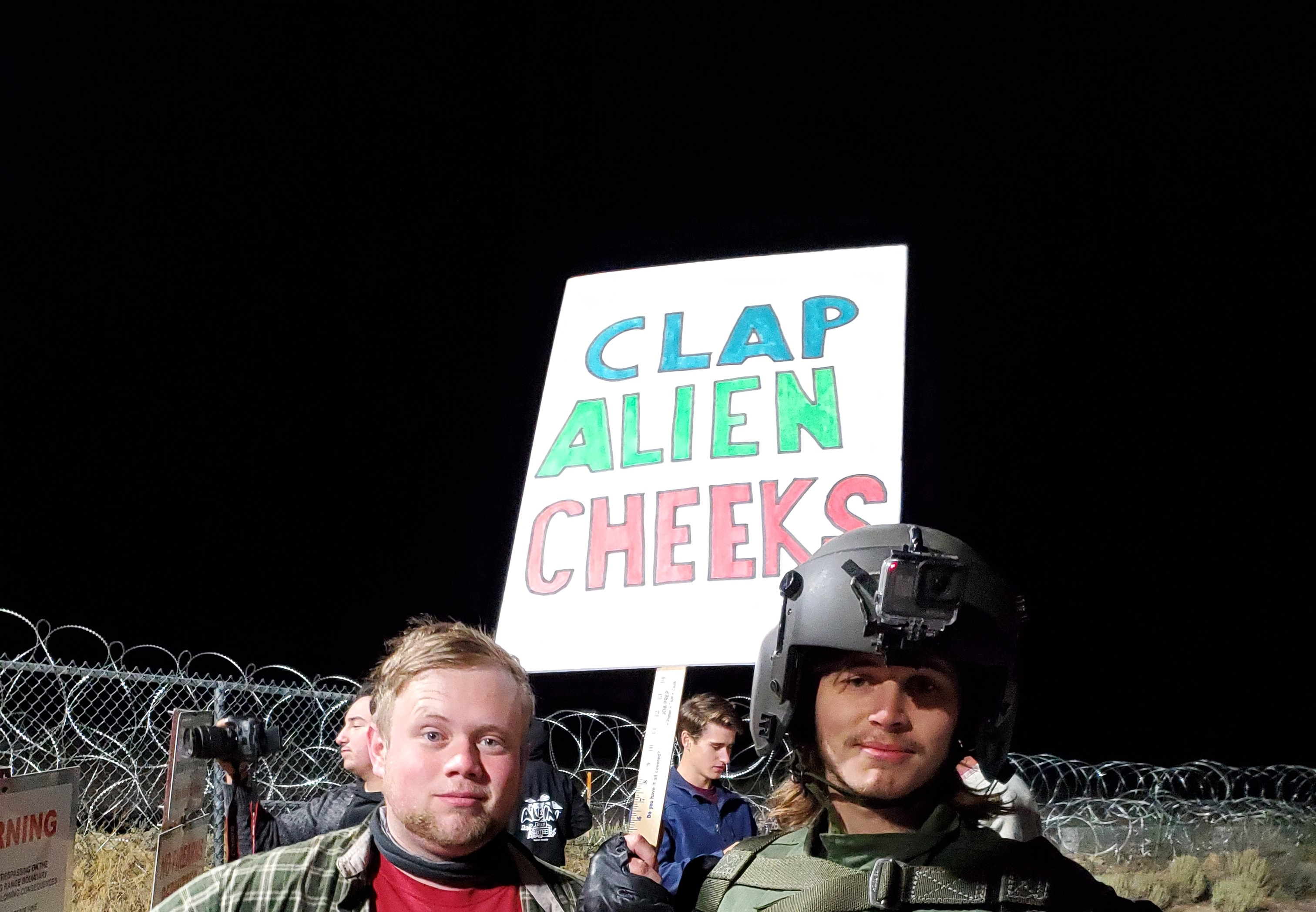
Protestors and UFO conspiracy theorists gathered at the back gate of Area 51.

The resulting meme quickly spread to other social media applications such as TikTok, Reddit, and Instagram. The Facebook page for the event was filled with thousands of satirical posts discussing topics like means of breaking into Area 51. The meme's virality caused Roberts to worry that he would receive a visit from the FBI. The event received 2 million "going" and another 1.5 million "interested" signatures as of August 22.

Rapper Lil Nas X released a music video for the Young Thug and Mason Ramsey remix of "Old Town Road" about the planned raid. Copycat events such as plans to storm a genealogical vault of the Church of Jesus Christ of Latter-day Saints, Loch Ness, the Bermuda Triangle, the US Capitol Building and the Vatican City's archives were also created.

Roberts enlisted the help of promoter "Disco Donnie" (aka James Estopinal) to help turn the Facebook event into a festival in Rachel, NV.

Parody raids, such as for Fun Time Kidz and The Church of Jesus Christ of Latter-day Saints vault in Utah, prompted intervention from local police forces.

== Response ==
=== National government ===
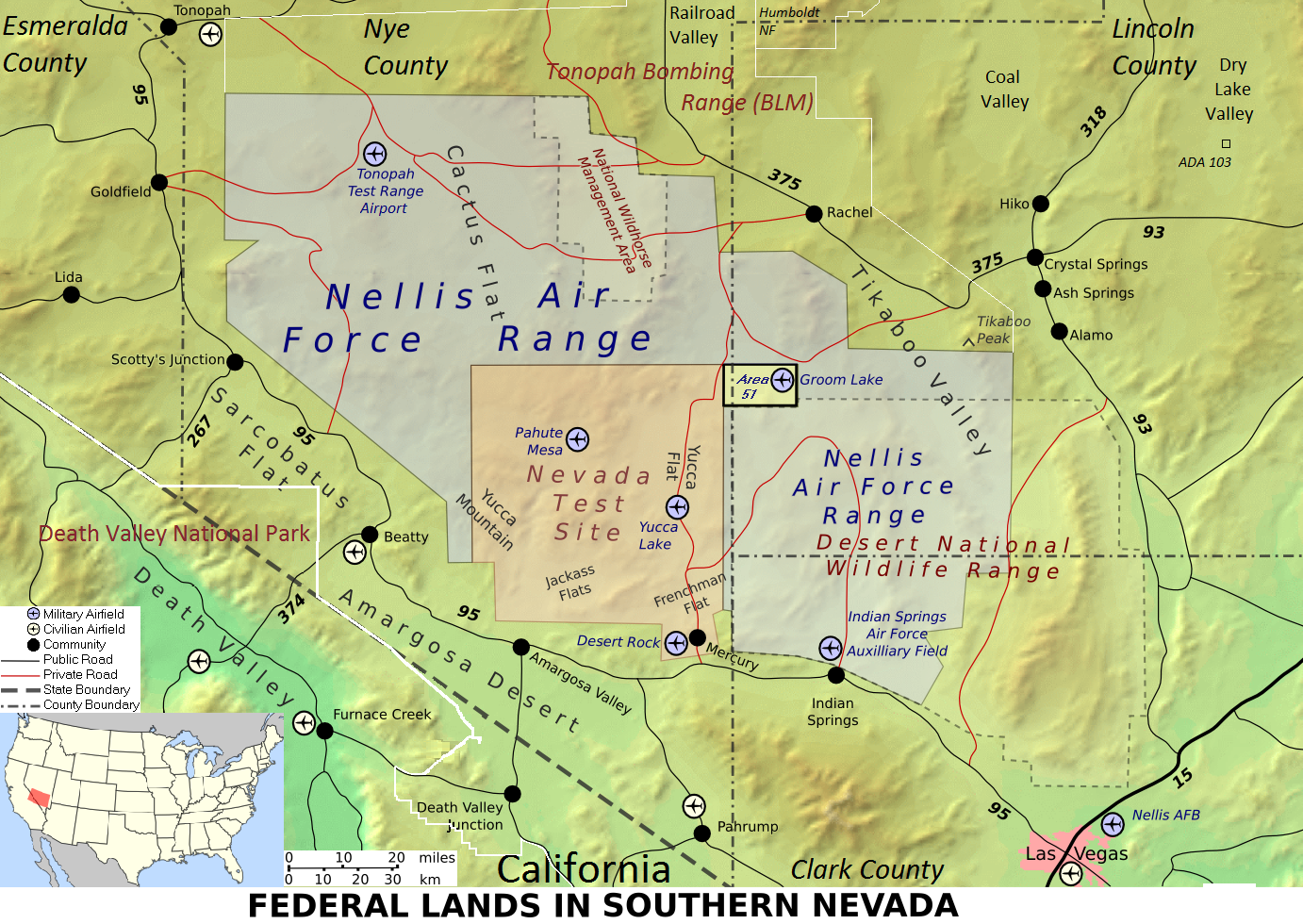
The US military land in Southern Nevada including Rachel, Hiko, Alamo, Armargosa Valley, and Las Vegas

On July 10, speaking with The Washington Post, Air Force spokeswoman Laura McAndrews stated officials were aware of the event, and issued a warning saying: "[Area 51] is an open training range for the U.S. Air Force, and we would discourage anyone from trying to come into the area where we train American armed forces", adding that "The U.S. Air Force always stands ready to protect America and its assets". A public information officer at Nellis Air Force Base told KNPR that "any attempt to illegally access the area is highly discouraged". The FBI also stated that they would be monitoring the situation and the number of people that would come to the events.

The events also prompted the Federal Aviation Administration (FAA) to post two temporary flight restrictions, closing the airspace above two places nearby Area 51 during the days surrounding the planned raid. The Defense Visual Information Distribution Service (DVIDS), the military's public relations office, made a Twitter post on September 20 depicting military personnel and a B-2 stealth bomber with the caption "The last thing #Millennials will see if they attempt the #area51raid today". The tweet was later deleted, and the DVIDS issued an apology.

=== Local government ===
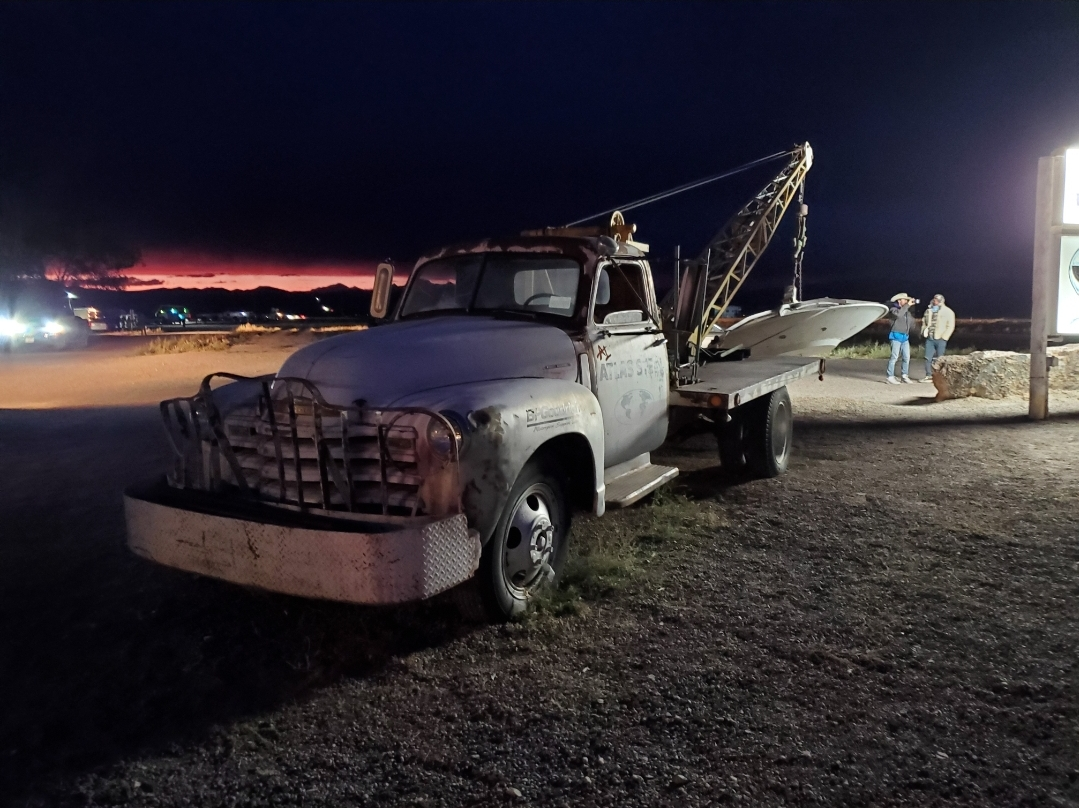
Art installation at the Little A'Le'Inn depicting a tow truck hauling a crashed UFO

In August 2019, Lincoln County officials drafted an emergency declaration and a plan to pool resources with neighboring counties, anticipating the region being overwhelmed by a crowd of 40,000 people. The county had just 184 hotel rooms, and officials expected the local cellphone network to be unable to cope with the additional traffic; they also expressed concerns about overcrowding at campsites, gas stations, and public medical facilities. County sheriff Kerry Lee said an extra 300 paramedics and 150 police officers would be brought in from across Nevada.

The town of Rachel posted a caution on its website, advising attendees to be "experienced in camping, hiking and surviving in a harsh desert environment and have a vehicle in good shape". They advised that the town would likely be unable to provide sufficient food, water or gas to visitors, and expected local law enforcement to be overwhelmed. The website warned that local residents would readily protect their property, predicting that Alienstock would be "Fyre Festival 2.0".

=== Businesses ===
Business owners in and around Rachel, Nevada, a town of 56 people just outside of the base, made preparations for visitors who planned to go to Area 51. Connie West, co-owner of the Little A'Le'Inn restaurant and inn, had all 13 rooms of the inn booked and planned to open up 30 acres (12 ha) for camping, also stating she would possibly create merchandise for the event. Las Vegas businessman George Harris planned to hire bands to play at an annual festival called "The Swarm". Kosmic Kae, owner of the shop Aliens R Us in Boulder City, stated that even though the shop was 170 miles (270 km) away from Area 51, business had increased due to fascination regarding aliens.

Other businesses around the U.S. based products and services on the event, and a collection of merchandise related to the event was launched from online retailers. Bud Light planned to release a promotional alien-themed beer label and promised a free beer to "any alien that makes it out" as long as a tweet showing the new design received 51,000 retweets. Fast food restaurant Arby's had planned to deliver food with a special menu to the event.

== Gathering and music festivals ==
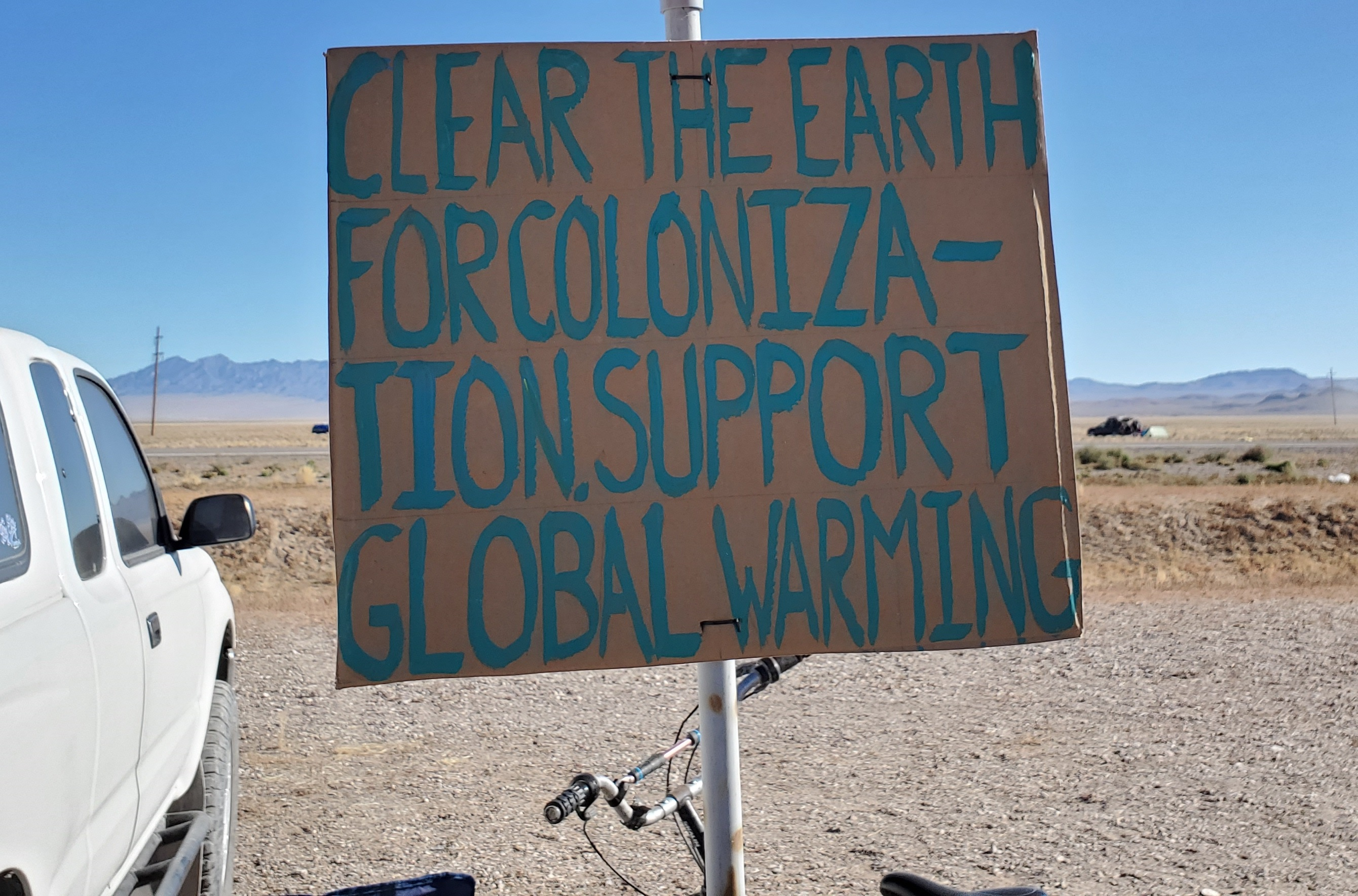
A protest sign at Storm Area 51 satirically suggests global warming should be "supported" to clear the Earth for alien colonization.

While the event was intended as comedic, some took it seriously, and traveled to areas surrounding the facility. Beginning on September 19, the day before the planned event date, people were reported to be showing up and camping around Rachel in preparation for the raid.

The Lincoln County Sheriff estimated that about 1,500 people showed up at the festivals, while about 150 people made the journey over several miles of rough roads to the back gate of Area 51. Some camped overnight outside the perimeter of the base while others arrived to gather and take selfies near the front gate before leaving. One person attempted to enter the facility and received a warning, while six others were arrested for crimes including public urination, alcohol-related offenses and indecent exposure. Near Rachel, two people were injured in a rollover crash which resulted in one victim being airlifted to Dixie Regional Medical Center. The speed of the emergency response was abnormally fast for an area so remote, and one of the victims expressed gratitude to the emergency personnel who were stationed close by to monitor the Alienstock festival.

Two music festivals were announced in the county in response to the event's popularity: Alienstock in Rachel, Nevada, and Storm Area 51 Basecamp in Hiko, Nevada. Local governments and police feared that even these legal events could be problematic if too many individuals attended.

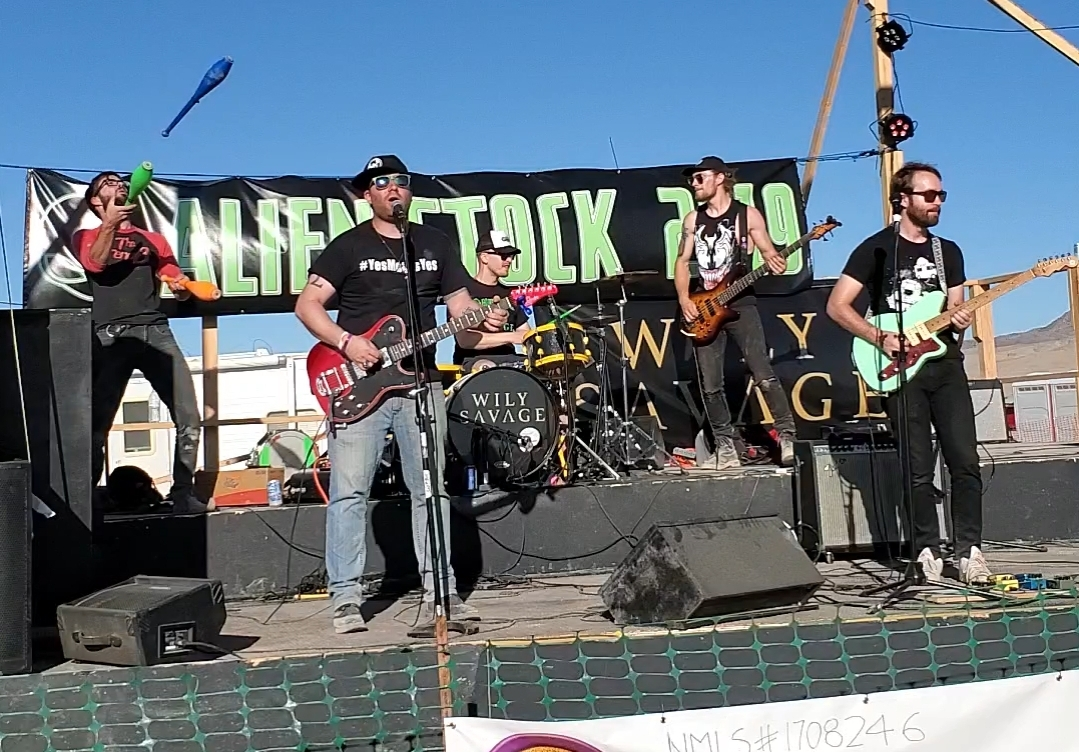
Wily Savage, a West Hollywood rock band, performing during the final day of the Alienstock music festival. All musical acts volunteered their performances for the event.

Event creator Roberts pulled out of Alienstock 10 days before the festival, leaving other organizers and booked entertainers to run the event. Roberts claimed his last-minute departure with $70,000–$100,000 in sponsorship money and donations was "due to poor planning", and he instead joined an alien-themed party already planned in Las Vegas, although the Little A'Le'Inn owner Connie West continued with the name Alienstock in Rachel, Nevada. Roberts's lawyers sent her a cease and desist regarding use of the name, but West was in possession of all of the Alienstock permits and ignored the legal threats.

After the raid, Keith Wright, a promoter for the Area 51 Basecamp event, stated that his event was a failure. Connie West, who organized Alienstock, declared her event a success. The event's aftermath saw several pending lawsuits surrounding the festival and Roberts's call to breach the government facility. Although there were far fewer than the estimated 30,000 attendees expected before Roberts's departure—and a press campaign claiming Alienstock was canceled—the event was thought to have brought the largest influx of people ever to visit Lincoln County at the same time.

== See also ==
- 2012 Saudi Arabia mass trespasses
- Trainwreck: Storm Area 51, 2025 documentary
- World Contact Day
- World UFO Day
- Josh fight, another real-life gathering originating as an Internet meme
- 2024 look-alike contests
- Suntukan sa Ace Hardware, a mock fight originating as an Internet meme turned into a promotional event for a hardware store
- Teen Takeover
