= National Anti-Corruption Commission =

The National Anti-Corruption Commission may refer to:

- National Anti-Corruption Commission (Thailand)
- National Anti-Corruption Commission (Saudi Arabia)
- National Anti-Corruption Commission (Australia)
- National Anti-Corruption Commission (Cameroon)
