= Irqah Hospital =

Defunct hospital in Riyadh, Saudi Arabia

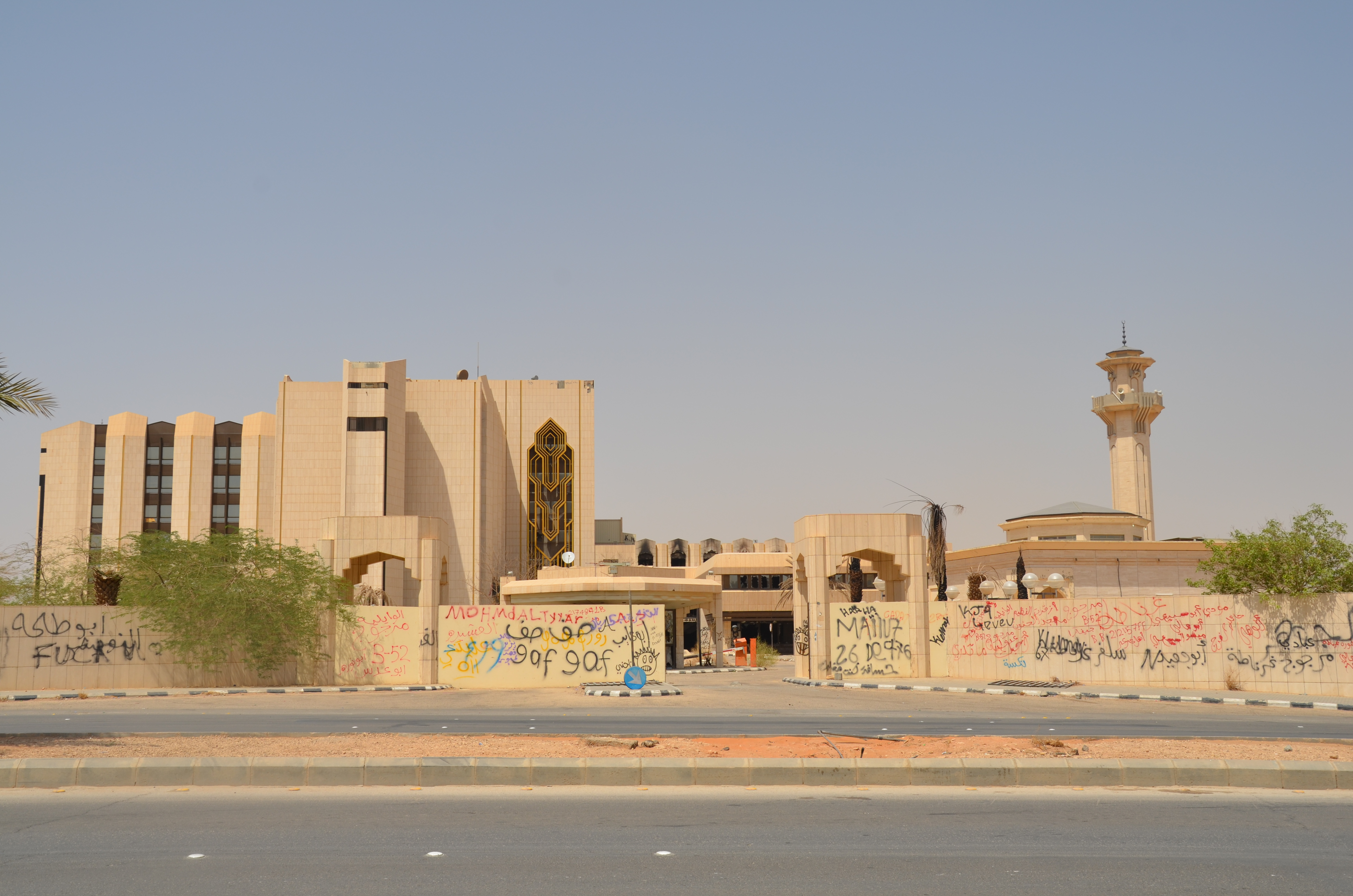
- Irqah Hospital site in September 2012

Geography
- Location: Irqah, Riyadh, Saudi Arabia
- Coordinates: 24°41′33″N 46°35′4″E

History
- Opened: 1993; 33 years ago
- Closed: 2001; 25 years ago

Links
- Lists: Hospitals in Saudi Arabia

Irqah Hospital (Arabic: مستشفى عرقة), also at times Ergah Hospital is a now-defunct and abandoned health care facility in the Irqah neighborhood of Riyadh, Saudi Arabia. Built in 1987, it initially housed number of Kuwaiti families fleeing the Iraqi invasion of Kuwait in 1990 besides treating combatants during the Gulf War. It was reopened in 1993 for the general public following the end of the war, functioning for nearly 8 years prior to ceasing operations around 2001. It is considered to be one of the most haunted sites in Riyadh where several incidents of unusual paranormal activities have been reported by residents living in its vicinity.

== History ==
Irqah Hospital was constructed in 1987 as a private medical facility by the Saudi Ministry of Health and funded by Saudi Oger. It housed several Kuwaiti families and treated combatants during the 1990-1991 Gulf crisis. It was reopened in 1993 as a hospital and served for nearly eight years before closing down in 2001. Since its disestablishment, the site is considered to be haunted by jinns by its nearby residents and have complained of strange paranormal activities.

== 2012 trespassing by ghost hunters ==
In May 2012, Al Eqtisadiah reported that a group of 30 young Saudis orchestrated an incursion on numerous suspected haunted locations across cities in Saudi Arabia, including the Irqah Hospital and termed the raid as "The National Day to Invade Dwelling Places of Jinn". The men stormed the hospital and set it ablaze, damaging 60% of the building in the process before the arrival of Saudi Civil Defense who extinguished the fire. Later, the police was alerted and a sizeable unit was mobilized towards the site after which they dispersed some of the trespassers. Soon after the incident, the Saudi Ministry of Health stated that it had revoked the affiliation of the hospital long ago as the building was beyond repair and inappropriate for use and relinquished any claim over the hospital.

== Renovation attempts ==
In 2014, after two years of investigation, the National Anti-Corruption Commission (Nazaha) submitted the report to the late King Abdullah in order to decide the fate of the abandoned health care facility.
