= Dual role =

One actor playing two or more roles

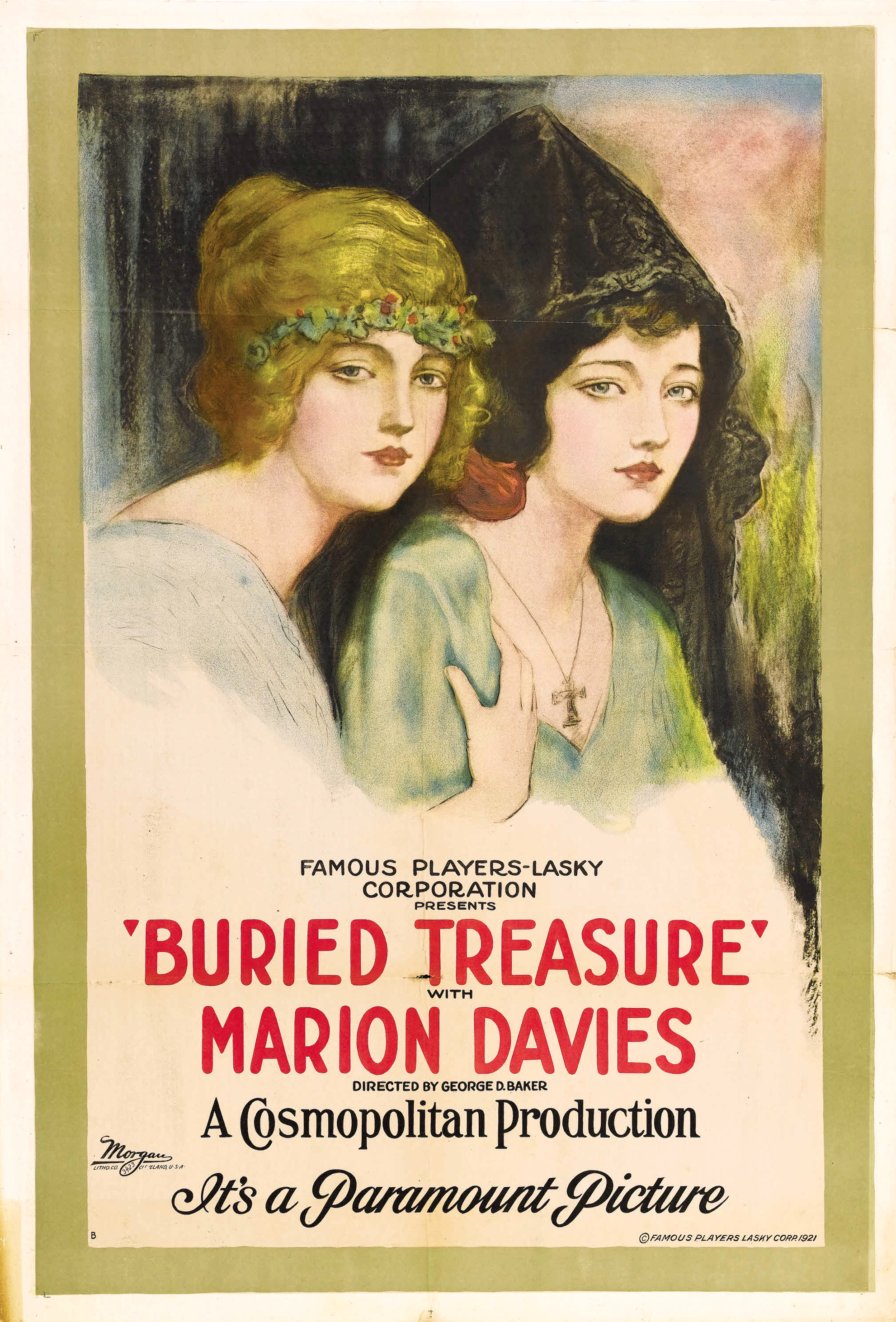
Marion Davies has multiple roles in Buried Treasure (1921) which has a reincarnation theme.

A dual role (also known as a double role) is an instance of one actor playing two roles in a single production. Dual roles (or a larger number of roles for an actor) may be deliberately written into a script, or may instead be a choice made during production, often due to a low budget. In film and television, dual roles are often used for comic effect, or to depict identical twins or other relatives. In a theatrical production where more than one actor plays multiple characters, it is sometimes referred to as an "Ironman" cast.

== Theatre ==
In theatre, the use of multiple roles may be budget-related, may be intended to give an accomplished actor more stage time or a greater challenge, or may be of thematic significance to the story. The combination of factors leading to such a decision may often remain unknown. For example, debate exists over the significance of William Shakespeare's use of dual roles, with a notable example being whether the characters of Cordelia and the Fool in King Lear were intended to be one and the same, or whether the mysterious Third Murderer in Macbeth is actually Macbeth himself. In the musical Hamilton, four actors/actresses are cast in dual roles, each a major supporting character, with a change of roles between the first and second acts. The actors who play John Laurens/Philip Hamilton, Marquis de Lafayette/Thomas Jefferson, and Hercules Mulligan/James Madison wear identical white costumes in the opening song, "Alexander Hamilton", and were given lines with intentional double meanings that would fit either of their dual roles.

In the original West End production of J. K. Rowling’s Harry Potter and the Cursed Child Parts One and Two many roles are doubled including Uncle Vernon/Severus Snape/Lord Voldemort, Aunt Petunia/Madame Hooch/Delores Umbridge, Amos Diggory/Albus Dumbledore, Trolley Witch/Minerva McGonagall, Cedric Diggory/James Potter Jr./James Potter Sr., Dudley Dursley/Karl Jenkins/Viktor Krum, and Rose Granger-Weasley/Young Hermione.

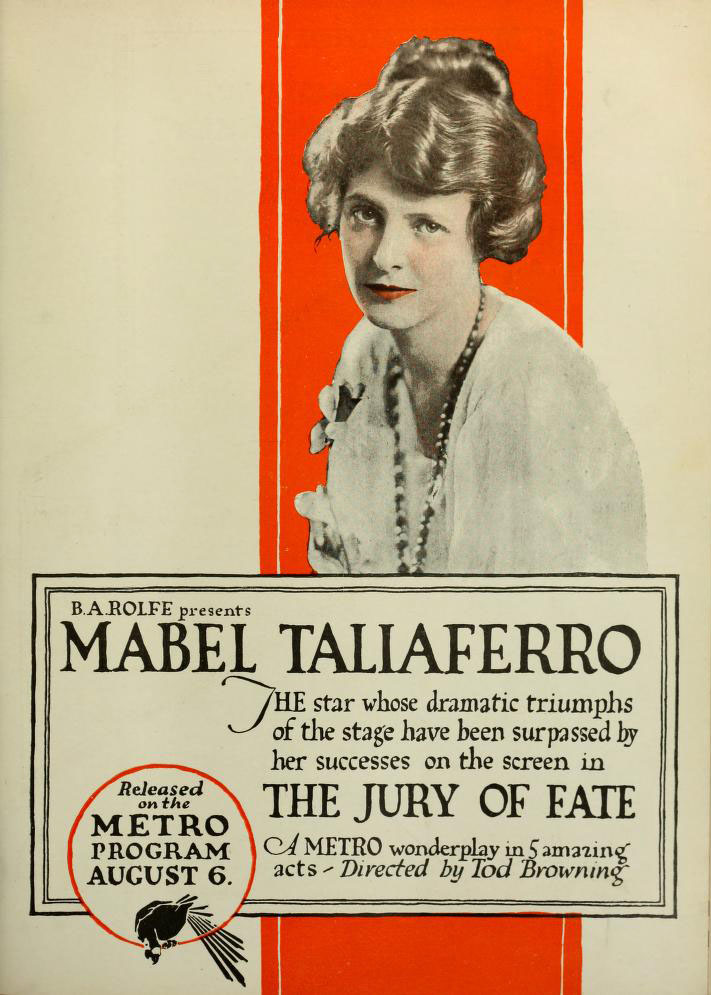
Mabel Taliaferro plays twin brother and sister in The Jury of Fate (1917), where the sister assumes the brother's place after he is killed

== Film ==
In a reverse situation, one character may be portrayed by multiple actors on rare occasions. Heath Ledger was cast as the lead in Terry Gilliam's The Imaginarium of Doctor Parnassus (2009). However, he died before completing production, albeit with most of his main scenes completed. So Gilliam cast Johnny Depp, Colin Farrell, and Jude Law as "transformations of the main character in magical realms" to finish production.

== Dual roles of twins and relatives ==
On live-action films and television, actors may be cast to play a dual role of identical twins, with examples such as the 1998 Disney film The Parent Trap, which stars actress Lindsay Lohan as twins Annie and Hallie; and Disney Channel TV series Liv and Maddie, which stars Dove Cameron as the titular twin characters Liv and Maddie. In the spy comedy film series Austin Powers, Mike Myers portrays both the titular protagonist Austin Powers and the main antagonist, Dr. Evil—who are revealed to be long-lost twin brothers in the third and final film Austin Powers in Goldmember.

This casting choice is, in turn, a specific example of dual roles of related characters. As a way of depicting family resemblance, actors may play two or more characters who are related, often for comedic effect. One example is the 1989 film Back to the Future Part II, in which actor Michael J. Fox portrays not only the protagonist, Marty McFly, but also his daughter Marlene McFly and his son Marty McFly Jr., who are depicted simultaneously in a scene at a dinner table at their home.
