= The Paul O'Sullivan Band =

International pop-rock band

- Origin: Baltimore, Maryland; Manchester, England; Rotterdam, Netherlands; Poconos, Pennsylvania
- Genre: Pop rock
- Years active: 2016–present
- Label: Unsigned
- Members: Paul O'Sullivan; Paul O'Sullivan; Paul O'Sullivan; Paul O'Sullivan
- Website: PaulPaulPaulPaul.com

The Paul O'Sullivan Band is an internationally based pop-rock band comprising four members, all named Paul O'Sullivan. The band members often use geographical nicknames ("Baltimore Paul", "Manchester Paul", "Rotterdam Paul", and "Pennsylvania Paul") to avoid confusion. Despite a common misconception that "Paul O'Sullivan" is merely an agreed-upon stage name, as part of a larger gimmick, all four members are legally named Paul O'Sullivan.

== History ==
Their debut music video (for the song "Namesake") was released on February 4, 2020. The "Namesake" music video garnered 20,000 views during its first two weeks, catching the eye of T&T Creative Media. On March 25, 2020, the band signed an exclusive licensing deal with T&T Creative.

On February 1, 2021, the band made their national television debut on The Kelly Clarkson Show.

On February 6, 2021, CBS National News aired an interview with the band conducted by Chip Reid.

On April 8, 2021, the band announced a fundraising campaign in which 50% of their profits would be donated to the COVID-19 Solidarity Response Fund. The campaign lasted three months, and led to the release of three new singles including "Before It Even Started," "The Last Man Standing," and "Namesake (Electronic Remix)."

== Origin ==
During the formation of the band, Paul O'Sullivan ("Baltimore Paul") intended for the group to be a trio. The vision was to create a trio composed of "Baltimore Paul," "Manchester Paul," and "Killarney Paul" (a lead guitarist from Killarney, Ireland also named Paul O'Sullivan). Ultimately, Killarney Paul was unable to join the group because of a prior commitment to his own band, Greywind. Shortly thereafter, Baltimore Paul asked a Paul O'Sullivan from Rotterdam, Netherlands if he wanted to join the band. "Rotterdam Paul" accepted the invitation, and became an official member of the band. Similarly, "Pennsylvania Paul" decided to join the band as the group's percussionist.

Once the lineup was solidified, the group shifted their attention to songwriting. Baltimore Paul and Rotterdam Paul would frequently send song demos back and forth to each other through the private messaging feature on Facebook. Ultimately, they worked together to create a basic 'skeleton' of their song "Namesake." Next, they gave the 'skeleton' of the song to bass player "Manchester Paul" (so he could write his respective part for the song). Given the remote nature of their collaborative process, the song had to be 'pieced together' at a professional recording studio. This process was executed by Grammy-nominated engineer/producer Eric Taft at The Buzzlounge Recording Studio in Beltsville, Maryland.

== Members ==
- Paul O'Sullivan ("Baltimore Paul") – vocals, guitar
- Paul O'Sullivan ("Manchester Paul") – bass
- Paul O'Sullivan ("Rotterdam Paul") – guitar, vocals
- Paul O'Sullivan ("Pennsylvania Paul") – drums, percussion

== Discography ==
=== EP ===
Title	Details
Internet Famous: A Retrospective EP	Released: December 30, 2020; Label: Unsigned

=== Singles ===
Title	Details
"Namesake"	Released: March 18, 2016; Label: Unsigned
"Before It Even Started"	Released: April 9, 2021; Label: Unsigned
"The Last Man Standing"	Released: May 28, 2021; Label: Unsigned
"Namesake (Electronic) [EST Dance Remix]"	Released: June 30, 2021; Label: Unsigned
"We Didn't Start the Fire (Part Two)"	Released: May 9, 2022; Label: Unsigned
"I Can't Find the Reason"	Released: November 10, 2022; Label: Unsigned
"Thriller"	Released: November 30, 2022; Label: Unsigned
"Ready"	Released: December 30, 2025; Label: Unsigned

=== Music videos ===
Title	Details
"Namesake"	Released: February 4, 2020; Director: Matthew Hoffacker
"We Didn't Start the Fire (Part Two)"	Released: May 9, 2022; Director: Paul A. O'Sullivan

== See also ==
- Are You Dave Gorman?, a famous comedy show that sought to find people sharing the name Dave Gorman
- Josh fight, a mock pool noodle fight and charity fundraiser held by over fifty people all named Josh
- Brady Feigl, a professional baseball player who shares a striking resemblance with another professional baseball player named Brady Feigl.
