= Trainwreck: Storm Area 51 =

2025 American documentary film by Jack Macinnes

- Film poster
- Directed by: Jack Macinnes
- Produced by: Emma Supple
- Starring: Matty Roberts
- Cinematography: Smith Patrick
- Distributed by: Netflix
- Release date: July 29, 2025
- Running time: 1 hour 37 minutes
- Country: United States
- Language: English

Trainwreck: Storm Area 51 is a 2025 American documentary film directed by Jack Macinnes. It appeared on Netflix on July 29, 2025, as part of the Trainwreck series.

== Synopsis ==
The film covers the social media joke later called "Storm Area 51" that escalated into an international news story. It began in 2019 when Matty Roberts created a Facebook event titled "Storm Area 51, They Can't Stop All of Us." The event became viral with over 2 million Facebook users RSVPing. The joke event encouraged participants to raid the U.S. Air Force's classified military site, Area 51 in Nevada. As attention for the event grew, the documentary reported that the U.S. government spent $11 million to prepare for the attempted breach of the base. The event resulted in two separate music festivals, one alien-themed party in Las Vegas, Nevada organized by Roberts and one in Rachel, Nevada called Alienstock. By August 2025, the documentary received 7 million views.

== Cast ==
- Matty Roberts
- Malina Ortega
- Kerry Lee
- Guy Malone
- Alice Little
- Killa Kev
- Sarah Fraser
- Ben Schneider
- Cavan Craddock
- Connie West
- Zeke Spector
- Danny Philippou
- Jeremy Corbell
- Prymrr
- Unicole Unicron
- Diso Donnie Estopinal
- Joerg Arnu
- Christopher Tomaino
- Varlin Higbee
- Frank DiMaggio

=== Archival footage ===
- Dayna Roselli
- Beth Fisher
- Danny Trejo
- Miley Cyrus
- Jimmy Kimmel
- Kevin Jonas
- Joe Rogan
- Billie Eilish
- Elon Musk
- Logan Paul
- Trevor Noah
- Lizzo
- Lil Nas X
- Darlene Demorizi
- Austin Carter
- Morgan Fogarty
