= Larry Wade =

American former track and field athlete (born 1974)

Personal information
- Born: November 22, 1974 (age 51) Giddings, Texas, country

Sport
- Sport: Track and field
Medal record
Representing United States
Pan American Games
| Silver medal – second place | 2003 Santo Domingo | 110m hurdles |

Larry Wade (born November 22, 1974) is an American former track and field athlete who specialized in the 110 metres hurdles. His personal best is a time of 13.01 seconds, achieved in July 1999 in Lausanne, which made him the seventh fastest man in the history of the event. He was inducted into the Texas A&M University Hall of Fame after winning the NCAA National Championship in the 55m and 110m hurdles.He was also inducted into the Lee County Texas Hall of Fame (Lee County Texas Historical Commission).

He later became one of the leading strength and conditioning coaches in the sport of boxing by winning 14 world titles. He has worked with professional boxers such as Shawn Porter, Badou Jack, Caleb Plant, and Youtube stars Jake Paul and Olajide Olatunji. He is a sports commentator for networks including ESPN and Fox Sports.

== Career ==
=== College ===
After Wade graduated from Elgin High School, he attended Texas A&M University (College Station), where he won Southwest Conference Championship in the 110m hurdles. He won a bronze medal at the 1995 Olympic Festival Championship in Colorado. He was a silver medalist at the 1995 NCAA Outdoor Track and Field Championship, with the 5th fastest time in NCAA history. In 1997, he won the first Track and Field Big 12 Conference Championship in the 110m hurdles, with a time of 13.38. This conference record lasted over 10 years. In that same year he became a member of the Alpha Phi Alpha fraternity at Texas A&M University (Pi Omicron chapter). He won two NCAA titles in 1998 (55hurdles/110m hurdles). Wade was selected to be in ESPN's "Faces in the Crowd" in 1998. The following year, he won the Big 12 indoor Conference Championship in another conference record of 7.09, then won the Indoor NCAA Championship in the 55m hurdles. Outdoors, he repeated as NCAA Champion, winning the 110m hurdles. Wade finished his career as a five-time NCAA All-American in track and field.

=== Professional ===
Wade turned professional in 1998, signing a professional deal with Nike. In 1999, he was ranked number 3 in the world by Track and Field News in the 110m hurdles. As a 2000 Olympic hopeful, he had heart surgery. In 2001, Wade won the bronze medal at the Goodwill Games in the 110m hurdles. In 2001, he was ranked number 3 in the world in the 110m hurdles by Track and Field News. In 2002, he was ranked number 3 in the world in the 110m hurdles by Track and Field News.

In 2003, Wade won a silver medal at the 2003 Pan American Games in the 110m hurdles. In 2003, he was third nationally and placed fourth at the 2003 World Championships in Athletics in the 110m hurdles. He was ranked number 6 in the world by Track and Field News for the season.

Between July 2004 and July 2006, Wade was suspended for USADA doping violations. In 2007, he returned to the track and ran a time of 13.37 that placed him in the top 10 in the US. In 2007, he officially retired from track and field.

== Coaching career ==
In 2006 Wade was selected to be the head track and field coach for the kingdom of Saudi Arabia for the 2006 Asian Games. The team won eight gold medals and two bronze medals in athletics at the competition.

In 2007, Wade was inducted into the Texas A&M University Hall of Fame. He was the 2007 head coach for track and field club Double Pillar LLC.

In 2008, he was selected as the co-head coach for Pasadena City College.

In 2009, he became the assistant coach for San Diego State University, which placed in the top 25 at the 2009 NCAA Track and Field Outdoor Championship. This was the first time the feat had been accomplished in 25 years.

In 2010, Wade became the head track and field coach For Pasadena City College. In 2012, he became the meet director for historical track and field meet, Pasadena Games.

Wade was honored as State Women's Track and Field Coach of the Year in 2013. He was hired as sprints coach at the University of Nevada, Las Vegas.

In 2013, Shawn Porter hired Wade as speed and conditioning coach, and he won the 2013 IBF Welterweight Championship.

In 2016, Wade was recognized as one of the elite strength and conditioning coaches in the nation. His client Porter was in the fight of the year against WBA welterweight champion Keith Thurman. WBC super middleweight champion Badou Jack hired Wade to be the strength and conditioning coach against IBF super middleweight champion James Degale. Wade helped to train welterweight boxer Porter to win Boxer of the Year; he also became the Number 1 WBC contender. The fight ended in a draw.

In 2017 Wade trained WBC super middleweight champion Badou Jack to win the WBA Light Heavyweight World Championship against Nathan Cleaverly. On November 4, 2017, Wade won his 4th world championship as a strength and conditioning coach with Shawn Porter, who won the WBC welterweight silver belt.

Athletes he has trained include:

- Javorius Allen - NFL
- Gilbert Arenas - NBA
- Dominique Arnold - American record holder, 110 hurdles / world championship medalist
- Hamdan Odha Al Bishi - Olympian
- Andrea Bliss
- Hector Cotto - Olympian
- Candice Davis - world championship medalist
- Devante Davis - NFL
- Leroy Dixon - world champion, 4x100
- Yahya Habeeb - Olympian
- Kazuto Ioka - boxing
- Badou Jack - Boxing
- Carmelita Jeter - Olympian / world record holder, 4x100 relay
- Joe Joyce - boxing
- Brandon Manumaleuna - NFL
- Rodney Martin - Olympian
- Shane Mosley Jr - boxing
- Olajide Olatunji - boxing
- Uhunoma Osazuwa - Olympian
- Louis Ortiz - boxing
- Jake Paul - boxing
- Caleb Plant - boxing
- Quinton Pointer - NFL
- Shawn Porter - boxing
- Brian Price - NFL
- Rolando Romero - boxing
- Jessica Sanchez
- John Steffensen - Olympian
- Shevon Stoddart - Olympian
- Nelly Tchayem - Olympian
- Patrick Teixeira - boxing
- Chauncey Washington - NFL

== Awards and recognition ==
Wade was given a proclamation from the City of Las Vegas for his work with professional and amateur boxers, naming December 15 officially Larry Wade Day in Nevada.

== International competitions ==
| Year | Competition | Venue | Position | Notes |
|---|---|---|---|---|
| 1999 | IAAF Grand Prix Final | Munich, Germany | 3rd | |
| 2001 | Goodwill Games | Brisbane, Australia | 3rd | |
| 2001 | IAAF Grand Prix Final | Melbourne, Australia | 8th | |
| 2003 | World Championships | Paris, France | 4th | |
| 2003 | Pan American Games | Santo Domingo, Dominican Republic | 2nd | |
| 2003 | World Athletics Final | Monte Carlo, Monaco | 8th | |

== See also ==
- List of doping cases in athletics
