= Suntukan sa Ace Hardware =

Filipino Facebook event of a satirical fist fight

- Date: April 15, 2016; 10 years ago
- Time: 15:00 PST (UTC+08:00)
- Venue: Ace Hardware, SM City Lucena, Lucena, Quezon, Philippines
- Motive: Playing along with the joke over a mock fist fighting event
- Organised by: "Bulbulito Balagbag: tuberong kulay green"
- Participants: More than 54,000 online participants
- Outcome: Ace Hardware held a promotional event in line with the fistfight theme, including setting up a mock boxing ring; no actual fist-fighting took place

Suntukan sa Ace Hardware (lit. 'Fistfight at Ace Hardware') was a Facebook joke event scheduled for April 15, 2016, at a real Ace Hardware branch at SM City Lucena in Lucena, Quezon, supposedly for a free-for-all fistfighting brawl. As the Internet meme went viral, thousands of Filipino netizens responded that they were "going" on the event's page before the date, which attracted attention from local news sources. On the day of the supposed fight, the real Ace Hardware location held a mock fight promotional event in acknowledgement, after initial corporate discomfort and disavowal.

== Background ==
The event was created as a shitpost by the Facebook user "Bulbulito Balagbag: tuberong kulay green", whose screen name is a crude Tagalog reference to pubic hair (bulbul) along with calling themselves a green-colored plumber, some time in March 2016. More than 54,000 Facebook users said that they would go to the event, while around 36,000 expressed interest. The event page was filled with users making humorous posts with comments, polls and images, spinning further memes from the joke where various fictional characters as well as local celebrities like actor Baron Geisler (then in the public eye for public altercations) were portrayed as being involved with the event. Copycat pages with similar joke events, like Group Study sa Sogo Hotel (implying a mass group sex orgy in the named motel, playing into the stereotype of motels as venues for sex), also appeared.

== Response ==
=== Ace Hardware ===
On March 31, 2016, Ace Hardware Corporation denied any involvement in the purported event. Netizens ironically expressed their "disappointment" over the advisory, saying that they cancelled prior commitments, such as weddings and even a childbirth, to attend the event.

On April 4 and 11, Ace Hardware, in an act that reversed their earlier condemnation, posted a countdown and released a poster for the fictitious event on their official Facebook page. On April 15, the day of the scheduled brawl, Ace Hardware prepared a small mock boxing ring where customers could pose and take photos. The date also coincidentally fell within a 3-day mallwide sale at SM City Lucena.

=== Advertising industry ===
Leigh Reyes, President and COO of MullenLowe Philippines, an advertising agency, criticized Ace Hardware's stern reaction to the tongue-in-cheek event, saying that disavowing any involvement and condemning those who organized the stunt is not an effective business strategy, but fame is. Reyes suggested using the ensuing publicity to their strategic advantage by offering discounts to actual attendees, for example. Curiously, this advice was later heeded by the mall, taking advantage of the upcoming sale.

== See also ==
- Josh fight
- Storm Area 51, They Can't Stop All of Us – a similar satirical Facebook event
- International State College of the Philippines – a fictional university that went viral through a Facebook satire page
