= Look-alike =

Person who closely resembles another person

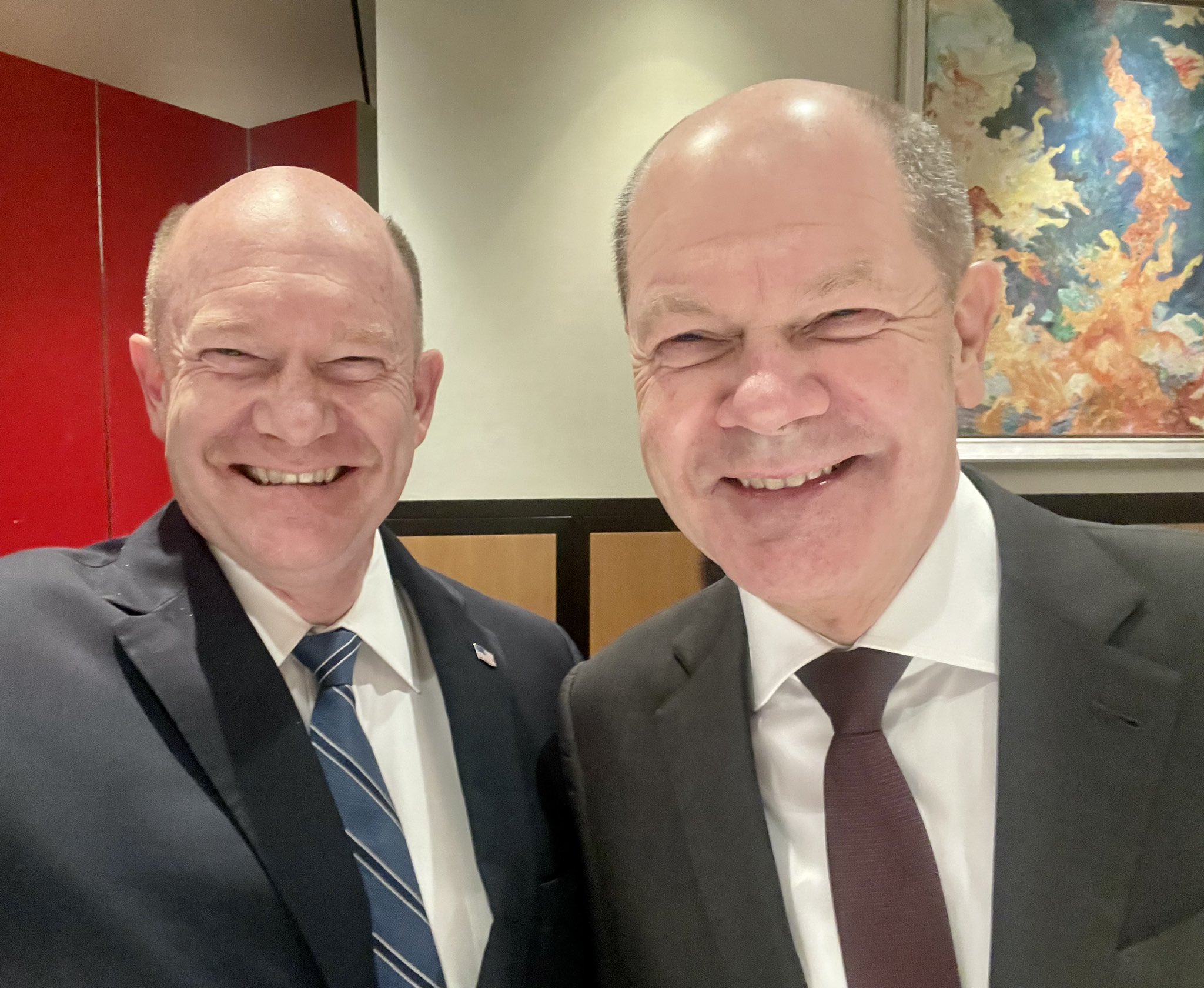
U.S. Senator Chris Coons (left), German chancellor Olaf Scholz

A look-alike, or double, is a person who bears a strong physical resemblance to another person, excluding cases like twins and other instances of family resemblance.

Some look-alikes have been notable individuals in their own right, such as the actresses Margot Robbie and Jaime Pressley. Other notable look-alikes have been notable solely for resembling well-known individuals, such as Clifton James, who acted as a double for British Field Marshal Bernard Montgomery during World War II.

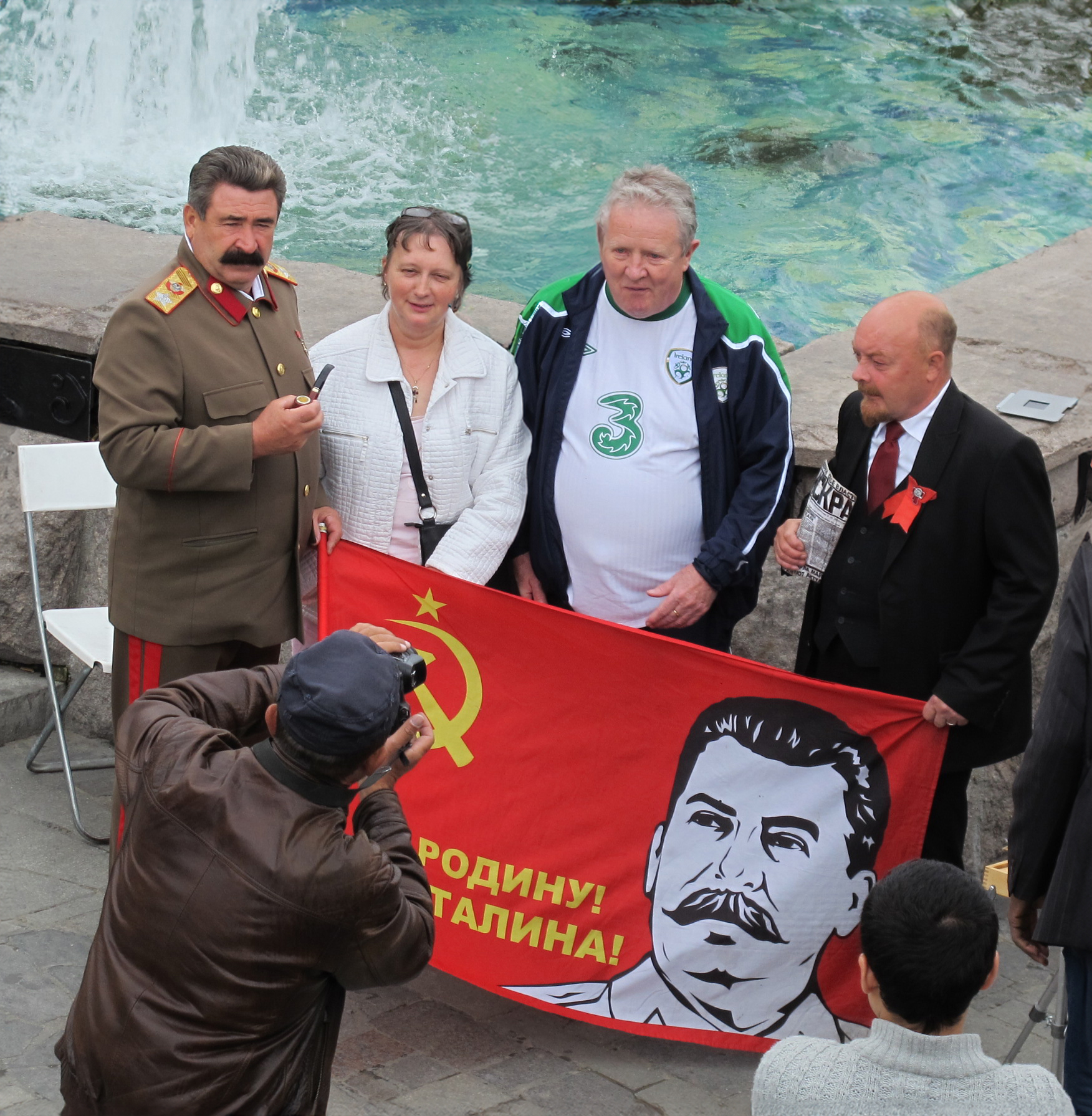
Stalin and Lenin look-alikes with tourists

Some look-alikes who have resembled celebrities have worked as entertainers, impersonating them on stage or screen, or at venues like parties and corporate functions. Professional look-alikes have often been represented by talent agencies specializing in celebrity impersonators.

Close physical resemblance between individuals is also a common plot point in works of fiction.

== Research ==
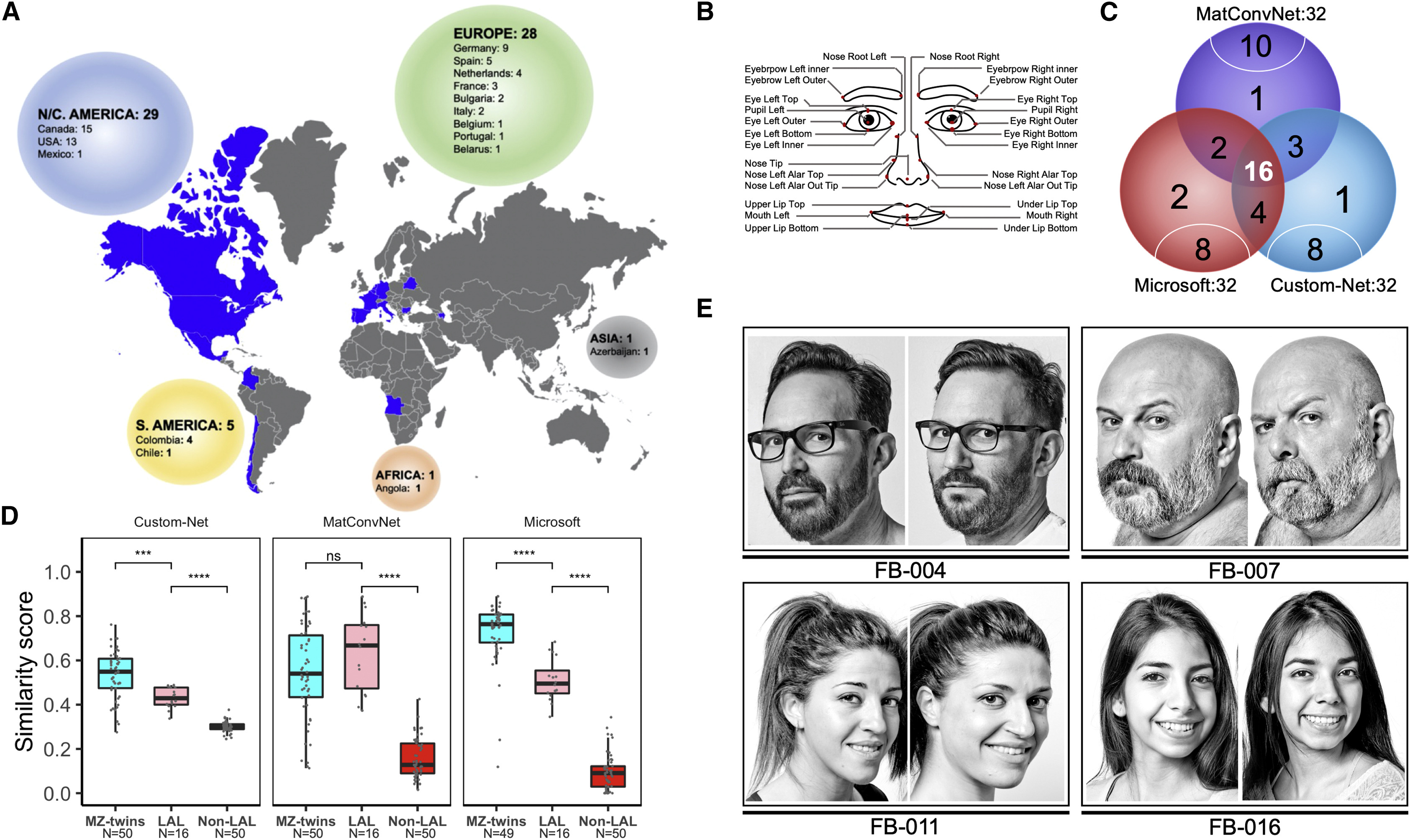
Illustration from the paper "Look-alike humans identified by facial recognition algorithms show genetic similarities"

According to a paper published in 2022 in the journal Cell Reports, look-alikes share many common genetic variations and are more likely than non-look-alikes to have characteristics in common.

With the advent of social media, there have been several reported cases of people finding their "twin stranger" online. There are several websites where users can upload a photo of themselves and facial recognition software attempts to match them with another user of like appearance. Some of these sites report that they have found numerous living doppelgängers.

Since 2000, photographer François Brunelle has documented look-alikes worldwide.

== Notable look-alikes ==
- A popular story about King Umberto I of Italy tells of the king eating in a restaurant and discovering the owner was his dead-ringer double. The story goes that upon talking to the man, Umberto learned of a string of coincidences between their lives, such as: the two men had been born in the same town on the same day, and had both married a woman with the same name, and the restaurant had opened on the day of Umberto's coronation. Umberto's assassination in 1900 is said to have happened the same day that he heard the news that the restaurateur had died in a shooting. This story is cited often in popular culture (Ripley's Believe It or Not!, The Big Book of the Unexplained) and may have been embellished somewhat.

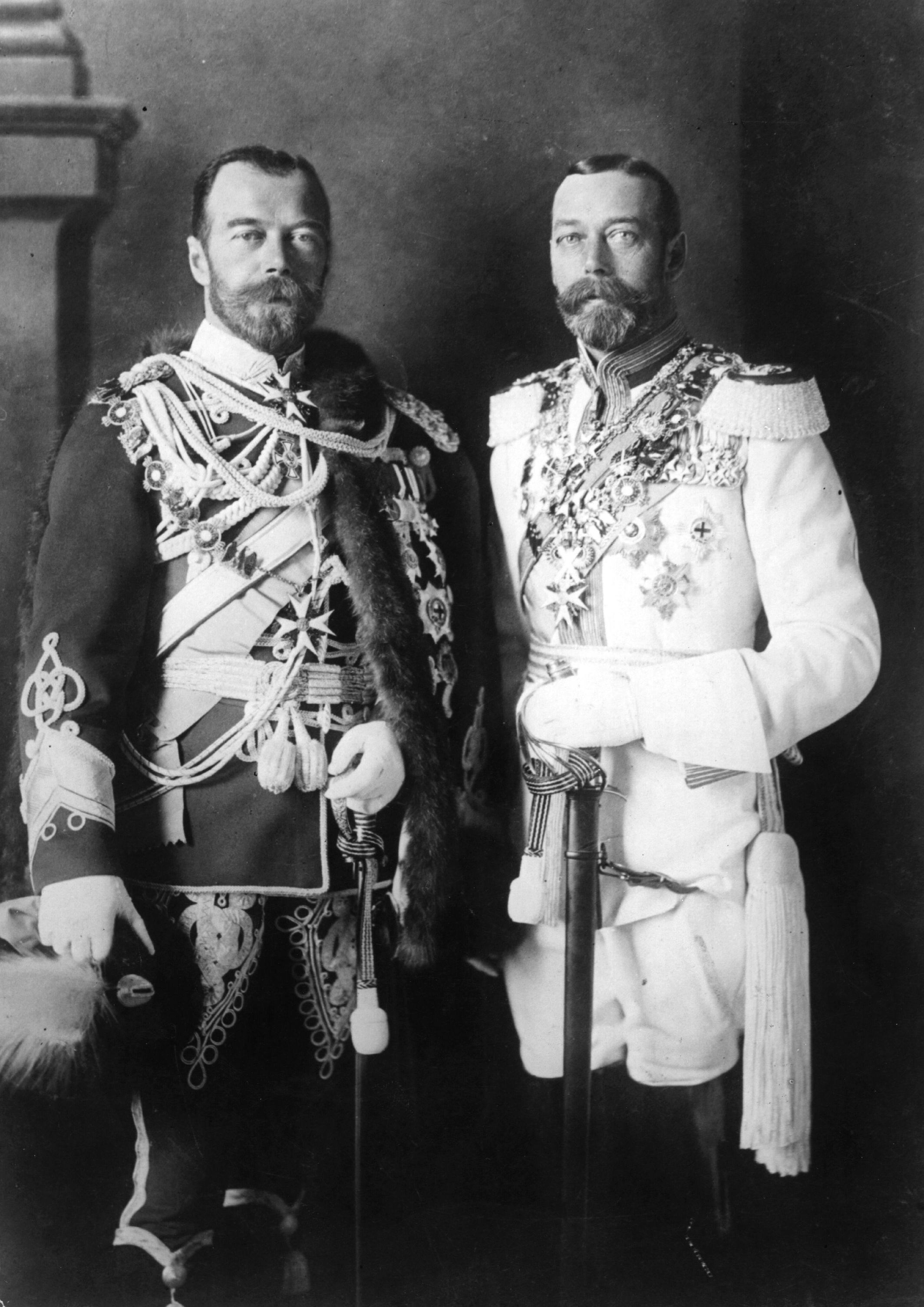
Nicholas II (left), George V in 1913

- The United Kingdom's King George V (1865–1936) and Russia's Tsar Nicholas II (1868–1918), who were first cousins (their mothers were sisters), bore an uncanny resemblance. Their facial features were distinguishable only up close, particularly their eyes. At George's wedding in 1893, according to The Times of London, the crowd may have mistaken Nicholas for George due to their similar beards and attire.
- An urban legend claims that Charlie Chaplin entered one of the many Chaplin look-alike contests and lost. It is retold in the musical Chaplin.
- British stuntman Vic Armstrong acted as Harrison Ford's body double in all the films of the original Indiana Jones trilogy. Reportedly, Armstrong looked so much like Harrison Ford that the crew members on set were constantly mistaking him for Ford.
- British Celebrity Big Brother contestant Chantelle Houghton worked briefly and unsuccessfully for a look-alike agency as a Paris Hilton look-alike, earning the nickname "Paris Travelodge". By the time Chantelle Houghton won series 4 of Celebrity Big Brother, the same agency had already signed up a professional model who made a more convincing Paris Hilton look-alike and who was briefly also offered as a fake "Chantelle".
- Dolly Parton has stated that she lost a 'Dolly Parton look-alike contest'.
- In 2008, a friend pointed out to Bronx native Louis Ortiz his striking resemblance to then-presidential candidate Barack Obama. Ortiz, initially as a money-making venture, sought gigs as an Obama impersonator. Ryan Murdock produced a documentary film about Ortiz's experiences, Bronx Obama.
- Two of the Parti Québécois's candidates, Bertrand St-Arnaud and Bernard Drainville, are considered look-alikes.
- Former basketball player Andrew Bynum has famously been compared to actor Tracy Morgan.
- Chad Smith, the drummer of the Red Hot Chili Peppers, has been called a look-alike of actor Will Ferrell.
- Two baseball players, both named Brady Feigl, share an uncanny resemblance to each other – even sharing the same height. Coincidentally, both players are pitchers for their respective teams, and both had elbow injuries that were treated by the same doctor.

== Fictional look-alikes ==
=== Literature ===
- In Mark Twain's first historical fiction (1882), the novel The Prince and the Pauper, Prince Edward, son of Henry VIII of England, and his pauper look-alike, Tom Canty, trade places.
- Bolesław Prus' historical novel Pharaoh (1895) features several cases of look-alikes. The characters include the Haranian Phut (aka the Chaldean priest Berossus) and his look-alike (chapter 20), and the protagonist Ramses and his look-alike and nemesis, Lykon. Also, chapter 33 makes reference to look-alikes of an earlier pharaoh, Ramses the Great.

== See also ==
- Assassinations in fiction
- Body double
- Cosplay
- Doppelgänger
- False pretender
- Impersonator
- List of actors who have played multiple roles in the same film
- List of impostors
- Menaechmi, a classical play about separated twins
- Mimicry
- Operation Mincemeat
- Political decoy
- Simulacrum
- Stand-in
- Twin
