= Fun Time Kidz Day Care urban legend =

Theory on building in Salt Lake City, US

Fun Time Kidz Day Care
- Fun Time Kidz Day Care in 2026

General information
- Architectural style: DayGlo green
- Location: 1246 S 300 E, Salt Lake City, UT 84111, United States
- Coordinates: 40°44′29.82″N 111°52′57.23″W
- Opened: c. 1960s
- Owner: Chunga International, LLC; José Solano

Other information
- Parking: Yes

Fun Time Kidz Day Care is a day care that operated in Salt Lake City, Utah, from at least 1963. While not particularly notable during its earlier operation, it became the focus of intense internet speculation during the mid-2010s due to the appearance of the exterior of the building and the lack of children witnessed entering or exiting the premises, including during business hours. Users of the platforms Reddit and 4chan made claims of the building being an unknown criminal headquarters or a government black site, with the owner of the day care harassed even after the deletion of the original subreddit thread. Despite the claims, state records show that the business has no criminal history and the claims are instead local urban legends.

== History ==
=== Local history ===
Locals have said they have "joyful memories" of the building throughout the 1960s and 1970s. One resident recalled attending the day care from 1963 until 1965. Another attended from 1967 until 1970. A young man volunteered at the building in the 1990s, at which time it was known as Fun Time Day Care. Local writer Bryan Young, speaking to Vice, said that the owner had purchased the building for his mother, occupying it despite operating at a loss. The current owner, Chunga International, LLC, took ownership of the building in 2012.

=== Building design ===
Situated on 1300 South and 300 East, the Fun Time Kidz Daycare building is colored in a DayGlo-green, and has purple doors with yellow window edges. The building had originally been painted yellow, with color changes made over the years. The building exterior has been described as both "creepy" and "ugly". The building and adjacent land was reportedly worth $313,600 in 2023, with the property being listed with a market value of $573,100 as of 22 May 2025.

== Internet intrigue ==
=== Conspiracy theories ===
In 2015, a local resident uploaded a photograph of the building to Reddit, claiming to have never seen any children enter or exit the premises in their five years of living in the area. Various claims were made in response to the post, with a mail carrier alleging that the children at the site were always asleep when they delivered mail to the day care. Others posted comments which further exacerbated interest in the building. Despite these claims, Utah Department of Health records showed that Fun Time Kidz was an operational business ran as a day care, recognized as such since May 2013. An inspection had presented no red flags other than an issue regarding exposed thistles in a vicinity where children were present. Conspiracy theorists, mostly consisting of local residents, continued to conduct independent investigations into the business and building after the initial Reddit post. One commenter contacted the Salt Lake City Police Department, who informed them that the building was closed. Many of these theorists, in a similar manner to Pizzagate, accused the building of being a secret government black site or a criminal group that engages in child abuse, drugs and organ harvesting. Some participants of the original thread noticed that comments from individuals defending the building had only recently registered their accounts, arousing suspicion. Claims regarding closed-circuit television at the premises and individuals harassing the owner, Jose Solano, prompted the administrators of the Salt Lake City subreddit to delete the thread entirely. Following this, photos taken of the building interior were posted on 4chan.

=== 2019 Facebook event ===
A parody of Storm Area 51 took place on Facebook in 2019. Two thousand users joined a group that had been setup and named "Storm Fun Time Kidz Care, They Can’t Stop Us All". The group pledged to break into the building on April 20 of the following year. In response to this, the Unified Police Department of Greater Salt Lake ordered people not to create these types of groups on the platform. The owner of the Fun Time Kidz also increased security at the premises with exterior CCTV and a deadbolt.

== Reception ==
Lynne McNeill, an associate professor of folklore at Utah State University, reasoned that the appearance of the building was a catalyst for Fun Time Kidz becoming an urban legend. When interviewed by The Salt Lake Tribune, McNeill summarized that "there's just things that visually in our communities are asking for explanation by standing out", concluding that when there isn't an immediate answer, conspiracy theories fill that void, citing Pizzagate as an example of the danger of confusing rumors with reality. VT attributed the creepiness of the building and the lack of children to the fact the day care was a failing local business in a low-income neighborhood. They predicted that the internet would quickly move onto the next subject of interest, naming the Parkland school shooting as an example. Mark Klekas, reporting for both KUTV and KJZZ, compared the Facebook Storm event with others that parody Storm Area 51, including joke raids for local liquor stores and The Church of Jesus Christ of Latter-day Saints vault, which prompted intervention from local police.
