= 2012 Saudi Arabia mass trespasses =

Mass raids in 2012 by ghost-hunters across Saudi Arabia

- The National Day to Invade Dwelling Places of Jinn
- Date: 21 May 2012; 14 years ago
- Location: Dammam, Riyadh, Jeddah, Tabuk, Najran, Jubail, Hafar al-Batin, Khobar
- Result: Partial vandalization of public and private properties, including Irqah Hospital; Arrests and detention of intruders involved in the campaign

Parties
Saudi ghost hunters; Volunteers	Ministry of Interior: Saudi Police Force; Saudi Traffic Police; Saudi Civil Defence

Number
300+	

Casualties
- Arrested: Around 200

The 2012 Saudi Arabia mass trespasses, known by its instigators as The National Day to Invade Dwelling Places of Jinn (Arabic: اليوم العالمي لغزو الجن, romanized: al-Yawm al-ʿĀlamī Liġazū al-Jinn) was a campaign by a group of several Saudi paranormal investigators to conduct surprise raids and storm suspected haunted sites across several cities in Saudi Arabia on 21 May 2012. The self-proclaimed ghost hunters had planned mass incursions into abandoned locations in Dammam, Khobar, Riyadh, Jubail, Hafar al-Batin, Najran, Jeddah and Tabuk and were partly successful before the Saudi law enforcement agencies foiled their attempts.

== Preparations ==
According to Al Eqtisadiah, a group of several self-proclaimed ghost-hunters began planning mass incursions into several selected so-called haunted sites in numerous Saudi Arabian cities. They began gathering volunteers across the country, by sending them text messages mainly through BlackBerry Messenger. The initial goal of the perpetrators were to record clips of the jinn residing in the suspected sites and upload them on social media. According to the Vice News, the date was set on May 21, 2012.

== Trespassing and aftermath ==
On 21 May 2012, the planned trespassing commenced, with participants targeting the already selected sites in the country. In Hafar al-Batin, the abandoned Al-Khazan Hospital was amongst the first to be targeted. A group of 30 men set the premises of the hospital on fire before it was extinguished by the civil defence and the intruders were detained by the police. In Khobar, a group of 80 men tried breaking into an abandoned building in the al-Jisr neighborhood. However, the residents living nearby alerted the authorities after which they intervened and detained the trespassers. In Jubail, a group of men tried entering the former building of the Ministry of Communication and Information Technology as well as the Al Jazeera Hospital in Jeddah. In Riyadh, a group of nearly 300 men stormed the abandoned Irqah Hospital, setting it ablaze and damaging nearly 60% of its premises before the Riyadh police intervened and evacuated the site besides detaining the intruders. Less than a week later, the Ministry of Health officially relinquished any affiliation with the hospital.

== See also ==
- Storm Area 51
