= Josh fight =

2021 event in Lincoln, Nebraska, US

- Date: April 24, 2021 (first event); May 21, 2022; (second event)
- Venue: Air Park, Lincoln, Nebraska, U.S. (2021); Bowling Lake Park, Lincoln, Nebraska, U.S. (2022)
- Location: 40.8223286°N 96.79820002°W
- Organized by: Josh Swain
- Participants: 900+ (2021); 200+ (2022)

The Josh fight was a viral Internet meme, mock fight, and charity fundraiser at Air Park in Lincoln, Nebraska, on April 24, 2021, with a second edition of the event occurring at Bowling Lake Park in Lincoln on May 21, 2022.

The event was originally conceived by a civil engineering student named Josh Swain from Tucson, Arizona, on April 24, 2020, due to boredom during COVID-19 lockdowns. It gained popularity after a screenshot of a Facebook Messenger group chat involving several users named Josh Swain spread widely on the Internet.

Swain encouraged participants of the chat to meet at a set of coordinates one year hence and fight for the right to use the name "Josh". The event, though initially intended as a joke, drew a crowd of nearly a thousand on the day of the event. The gathering was lighthearted and there was no actual violence involved. The Wall Street Journal wrote that the event became a "global news phenomenon," while a technology writer for The Guardian called it "perhaps the ultimate response to an online doppelgänger".

== Background ==
On April 24, 2020, several Facebook Messenger users named Josh Swain were added to a group chat that read,

– You're probably wondering why I've gathered you all here today

– Because we all share the same names....?

– Precisely, 4/24/2021, 12:00 PM, meet at these coordinates, (40.8223286°N 96.7982002°W) we fight, whoever wins gets to keep the name, everyone else has to change their name, you have a year to prepare, good luck

joshua swain
(@joshswainaz)
tweeted:

there can only be one https://pic.twitter.com/VPamxjJ0yL

April 24, 2020

Swain explained the idea for the event was conceived out of boredom from the COVID-19 lockdowns. Swain had often experienced the frustration of being unable to receive an exclusive handle on social media because of other Josh Swains. He posted a screenshot of the conversation on Twitter the same day. The tweet received over 64,000 likes and 21,000 retweets within two weeks, surprising Swain.

Although Swain said the tweet was "entirely a joke," the conversation became a meme on social media. Days before the event, Swain took to Reddit in order to announce a fundraiser for the event to benefit the Children's Hospital & Medical Center (CH&MC) Foundation in Omaha, along with a request for non-perishables to start a food drive for the Food Bank of Lincoln. In the same post, Swain encouraged attendees to bring pool noodles as mock weapons for the planned fight.

Swain had selected Lincoln, Nebraska, as a site for the event due to its central location within the United States; the original randomly picked coordinates were located in a field on private property. The field's owner, however, did not agree to host "such a ridiculous event," and as such the fight was relocated to Air Park, approximately 2.6 miles (4.2 km) away.

== Event ==
On the chosen day, nearly a thousand people, including at least 50 named Josh, congregated at Air Park. Attendees came from as far as New York, Washington, and Texas, with some dressed in superhero and Star Wars costumes. Three "fights" were held—one game of rock paper scissors for those named Josh Swain, a second with pool noodles for all attendees named Josh, and a third and final all-in battle for anyone in possession of a pool noodle willing to participate.

Only two of the individuals in attendance were named "Josh Swain"—Josh Swain, the event's creator, beat a rival 38-year-old Josh Swain from Omaha in the rock paper scissors event. A local five-year-old boy named Josh Vinson Jr., dubbed "Little Josh," who had been treated at the CH&MC for seizures when he was two years old, was declared the overall winner. Vinson Jr. was crowned with a paper coronet from Burger King as well as a replica AEW World Championship belt. Vinson Jr.'s father, Josh Vinson Sr., said afterward that his son "had the time of his life."

The gathering raised US$14,355 for the Children's Hospital & Medical Center Foundation—far past its initial goal of US$1,000—and collected over 200 pounds (90 kg) of food for the nearby food bank. The CH&MC has since shown appreciation for the fundraiser on social media. On May 6, 2021, Josh Cellars, a Californian winery, decided to triple the donation by donating $30,000 to the CH&MC. The Wall Street Journal wrote that the event became a "global news phenomenon."

The next year, a second edition of the event was held on May 21, 2022, at Bowling Lake Park. The anniversary event was organized by the Arizonan Swain, with donations once again going to the CH&MC. Around 200 people attended the event, including at least 20 people being named Josh. The redux raised US$20,576, with Josh Cellars agreeing to double the donation. According to The Wall Street Journal, Swain would like to have the Josh fight occur annually, but said "he's not sure if he'll be able to keep it up." There has not been a new event since 2022.

== See also ==
- Are You Dave Gorman? – British comedy stage show and book
- The Paul O'Sullivan Band – International pop-rock band
- Satō–Suzuki Baseball Match – 2025 match in Sano, Tochigi, Japan
- Brady Feigl, two baseball players who look alike but are not related
- Storm Area 51
- 2024 look-alike contests
