= Jeremy Corbell =

American artist, filmmaker and ufologist

- Born: Los Angeles, California, U.S.
- Movement: Contemporary artist
- Spouse: Katrina Bea
- Website: extraordinarybeliefs.com

Jeremy Kenyon Lockyer Corbell (born February 3, 1977) is an American contemporary artist, filmmaker and ufologist based in Los Angeles, California. Initially gaining prominence as a visual artist, by the late 2010s Corbell became a well known figure in the UFO community, producing documentary films and podcasts on the subject.

== Martial arts career ==
Corbell is a black belt in traditional ju jitsu, and is the creator of "quantum ju jitsu." In 2001, he self-published his first book, Radiant Source - Cultivating Warrior Consciousness, about his philosophy of martial arts.

Corbell taught ju jitsu and yoga at the University of California Santa Cruz, and has appeared in Black Belt Magazine.

Corbell developed a martial arts and yoga curriculum to provide training for at-risk youth, including a juvenile hall yoga program. Following discharge from juvenile hall, students continue instruction during and after their probation period.

Although there is no record of Corbell ever competing as a martial artist, Corbell has consulted on the films I Am Number Four and Bunraku, and the video game UFC Undisputed 2010. One of his ju jitsu demonstrations has received over 6 million views on YouTube.

== Art career ==
While traveling in Nepal and India in 2004 Corbell contracted Valley fever. He lost more than 40 pounds (18 kg), experienced daily fevers, hallucinations, and distorted vision. He made it home to be treated by doctors at UCLA. Unable to practice martial arts for over a year due to medical complications, he began creating art.

In 2004, Corbell began secretly harvesting local building demolitions for early-century windows and doors in the Los Angeles area. He began recycling them into art installations. Over the years Corbell has exhibited his work in private settings and galleries.

=== Exhibitions ===
Some of the exhibitions by Corbell include:

- Death to Life: Corbell disassembled computers and embedded them into vintage doors and windows harvested from local Los Angeles demolitions. The pieces were distributed throughout the Los Angeles area and showed rotating imagery and sounds from his travels in Nepal and India.
- Factory Girl Exhibition: In coordination with a pre-premiere of Factory Girl, Corbell exhibited an original body of work as part of a comparative exhibition with a series of privately owned Andy Warhol paintings.
- ICON: Life Love & Style of Sharon Tate: In honor of the 40th anniversary of Sharon Tate's passing, with the blessing of the Tate family he created a 350-piece historic art exhibition celebrating Sharon Tate's style and life. The art and fashion based exhibition showcases images of her wardrobe by designers such as Christian Dior, Thea Porter, Ossie Clark and Yves Saint Laurent.
- Strange Love: An artistic collaboration between Corbell and Katrina Bea held in historic downtown Los Angeles. The body of work included assemblage works, paintings, photography, film and fashion.
- Bunraku Art Experience: Chateau Marmont: Held at the Chateau Marmont (Penthouse 64) in Hollywood California, Corbell hosted a one-night-only art installation for the cast of Bukraku by director Guy Moshe. In lieu of a premiere, Corbell's art exhibition revealed images and art pieces of Demi Moore, Josh Hartnett, Woody Harrelson, Ron Perlman and Kevin McKidd.

== Filmmaking and UFOlogy ==
Corbell has been described as a "ufologist celebrity" and a "UFO enthusiast".

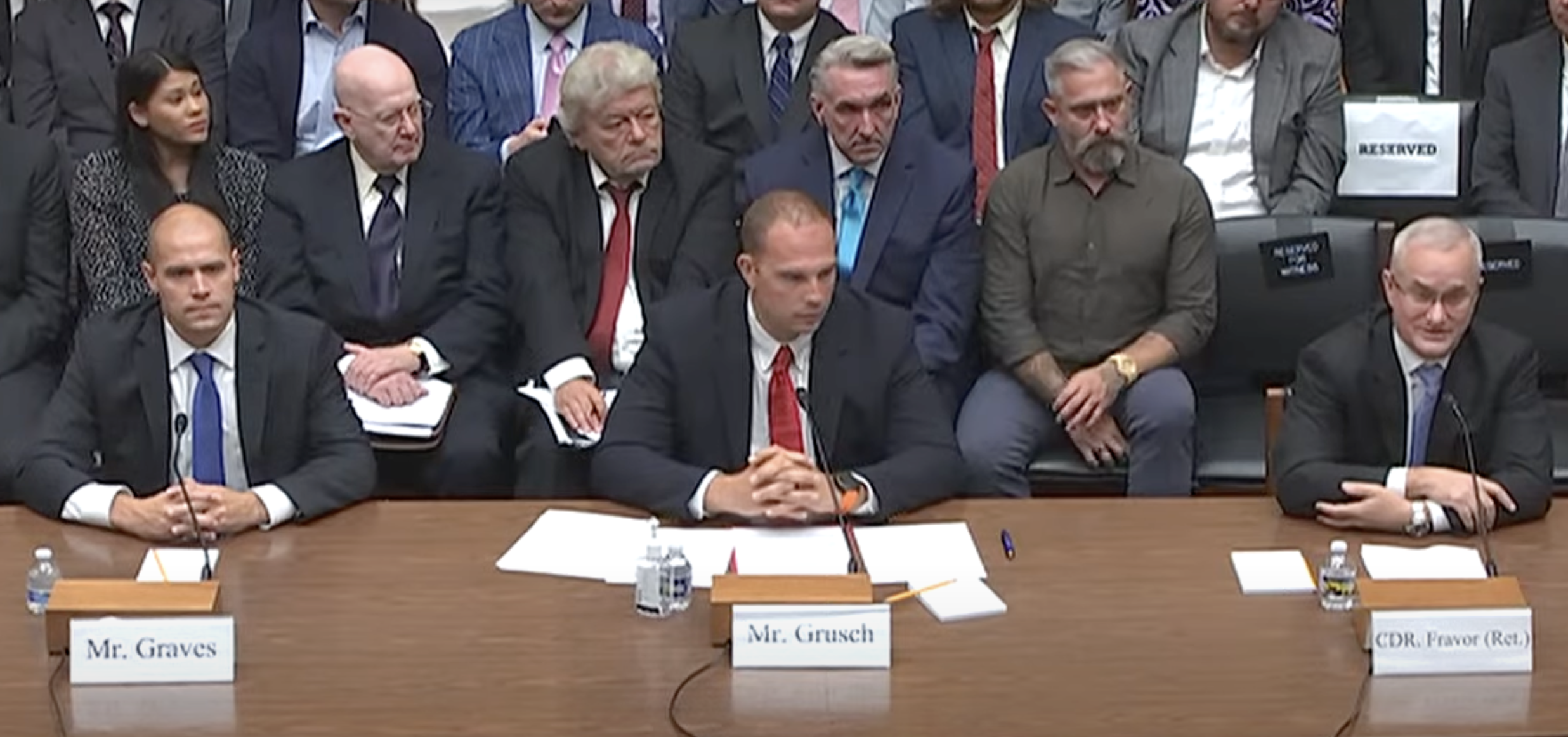
Corbell in July 2023 while sitting behind David Grusch.

Corbell has made a number of documentary films relating to the subject. His films include Hunt for the Skinwalker, based on a book by George Knapp and Colm Kelleher, and distributed by The Orchard, focusing on Skinwalker Ranch, a location associated with paranormal and UFO-related claims.

Corbell has released several UFO-related videos and still images. These have included leaked footage from U.S. Navy aircraft associated with the USS Omaha and video of what appeared to be triangular objects in the sky, filmed by U.S. Navy personnel consistent with visual artifacts due to a triangular lens aperture.

In 2018 Corbell directed the documentary Bob Lazar: Area 51 & Flying Saucers. The documentary, which premiered on Netflix in 2019, provides a sympathetic account of Bob Lazar, who claims without evidence to have worked on UFOs near Area 51 in the 1980s. The documentary brought Lazar back into public attention, and inspired the Storm Area 51 meme. His work in the UFO community with the documentary attracted a mix of curiosity and scrutiny, with some in the community labelling Corbell as a "dupe" of Lazar.

Corbell co-hosts the UFO-focused "Weaponized" podcast alongside fellow UFOlogist and journalist George Knapp. Corbell has also appeared on the Joe Rogan Experience podcast to discuss UFOs.
