= World Contact Day =

Unofficial observance by some Ufologists

- Observed by: International
- Type: Cultural
- Significance: A day attempting to make ET contact
- Celebrations: Mass Meditation
- Date: March 15
- Next time: 15 March 2026
- Frequency: annual
- Related to: Ufology

World Contact Day was first declared in March 1953 by an organization called the International Flying Saucer Bureau (IFSB), as a day on which all IFSB members would attempt to send a telepathic message into space.

The IFSB voted to hold such a day in 1953, theorising that if both telepathy and alien life were real, a large number of people focussing on an identical piece of text may be able to transmit the message through space. IFSB members focused on the following message during 1953:

Calling occupants of interplanetary craft! Calling occupants of interplanetary craft that have been observing our planet EARTH. We of IFSB wish to make contact with you. We are your friends, and would like you to make an appearance here on EARTH. Your presence before us will be welcomed with the utmost friendship. We will do all in our power to promote mutual understanding between your people and the people of EARTH. Please come in peace and help us in our EARTHLY problems. Give us some sign that you have received our message. Be responsible for creating a miracle here on our planet to wake up the ignorant ones to reality. Let us hear from you. We are your friends.

The 1953 celebration is referenced in the song "Calling Occupants of Interplanetary Craft", released in 1976 by Klaatu and later covered in 1977 by The Carpenters for their album Passage.

On the event's 60th anniversary in 2013, World Contact Day was extended to a whole week.

== See also ==
- World UFO Day
- World Contact Day 2023 online Gathering - OpenContactTV.com / Languages Of Lights
