= World UFO Day =

Unofficial observance, June 24 or July 2

- Observed by: International
- Type: Cultural
- Significance: A day celebrating UFOs.
- Celebrations: Sky-watching, parties
- Date: June 24, July 2
- Frequency: annual
- Related to: Unidentified flying objects, Ufology

World UFO Day is an awareness day for people to gather together and watch the skies for unidentified flying objects (UFO).

== Dates of Observance ==
The day is celebrated by some on June 24, and others on July 2. June 24 is the date that reporter Kenneth Arnold wrote about what is generally considered to be the first widely reported UFO in the United States, while July 2 is the date of the supposed UFO crash in the 1947 Roswell incident. July 2 was declared as the official World UFO Day by the World UFO Day Organisation. It is believed that the first World UFO Day was celebrated in 2001 by UFO researcher Haktan Akdogan.

== Purpose ==
The stated goal of the July 2 celebration is to raise awareness of "the undoubted existence of UFOs" and to encourage governments to declassify their files on UFO sightings.

World UFO Day is celebrated by stirring conversations about how and why humans are not the only beings in the Universe. The WUFDO (World UFO Day Organisation) promotes various events and educational workshops with the idea of getting people to know about UFOs.

== See also ==
- World Contact Day
