= Family resemblance (anthropology) =

Physical and psychological similarities shared between close relatives

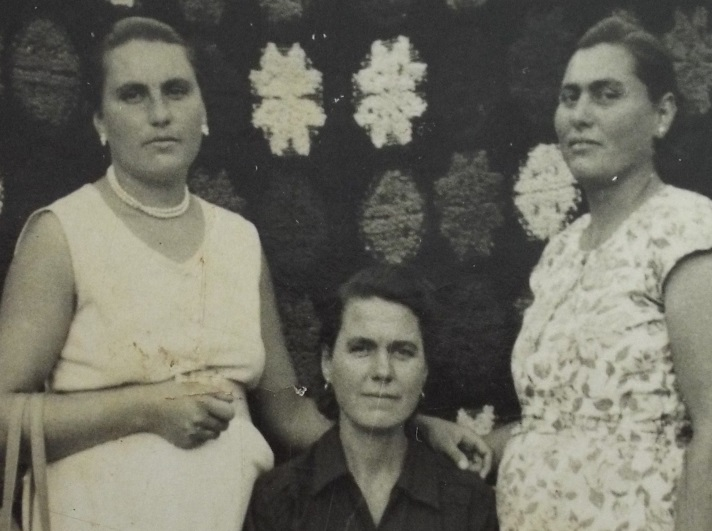
Three sisters

Family resemblance refers to physical similarities shared between close relatives, especially between parents and children and between siblings. In psychology, the similarities of personality are also observed.

== Genetics ==
Heritability, defined as a measure of family resemblance, causes traits to be genetically passed from parents to offspring (heredity), allowing evolutionarily advantageous traits to persist through generations. Despite sharing parents, siblings do not inherit identical genes, making studies on identical twins (who have identical DNA) especially effective at analyzing the role genetics play in phenotypic similarity. Studies have found that generational resemblance of many phenotypic traits results from the inheritance of multiples genes that collectively influence a trait (additive genetic variance). There is evidence of heritability in personality traits. For example, one study found that approximately half of personality differences in high-school aged fraternal and identical twins were due to genetic variation - and another study suggests that no one personality trait is more heritable than another.

== Environment ==
Family resemblance is also shaped by environmental factors, temperature, light, nutrition, exposure to drugs, the time that different family members spend in shared and non-shared environments, are examples of factors found to influence phenotype. Phenotypes found to be largely environmentally determined in humans include personality, height, and weight. Twin studies have shown that more than half of the variation in a few major aspects of personality are environmentally determined, and that environmental factors even affect traits like immune response and how children handle stress. Additionally, anomalous findings, such as second-degree relatives of alcoholics, showing surprising similarities to them have led some researchers' attempts in generating better models that account for the environmental impacts on influences like cultural inheritance, family structure and head of household, which have been shown to influence family resemblance.

== See also ==
- Biological anthropology
- Twins
- Look alike
- Heredity

== Bibliography ==
- Rao DC, Morton NE, Yee S (May 1974). "Analysis of family resemblance. II. A linear model for familial correlation". American Journal of Human Genetics. 26 (3): 331–59. PMC 1762612. PMID 4857114.
- Slatis HM, Hoene RE (March 1961). "The Effect of Consanguinity on the Distribution of Continuously Variable-Characteristics". American Journal of Human Genetics. 13 (1 Pt 1): 28–31. PMC 1932098. PMID 17948464.
