= National Anti-Corruption Commission (Cameroon) =

Government agency in Cameroon

Government agency overview
- Formed: 2006
- Headquarters: Cameroon
- Government agency executive: Dr. Dieudonné Massi Gams
- Website: https://conac.cm/en/about-us/history/

The National Anti-Corruption Commission (CONAC) is an independent public body in Cameroon that is responsible for the fight against corruption in the country.

Established in 2006, CONAC is under the administrative supervision of the President of Cameroon Presidency of the Republic but functions with financial and operational autonomy. Its primary mandates include monitoring, identifying, and investigating cases of corruption, as well as raising public awareness and promoting integrity within public and private sectors.

== History ==
President Paul Biya signed Presidential Decree No. 2006/088, which created the National Anti-Corruption Commission (CONAC) on March 11, 2006. The Commission's establishment and Cameroon's acceptance of the United Nations Convention against Corruption (UNCAC) in February 2006 marked a fundamental change in the nation's stance on institutional corruption.

== Mandate and functions ==
The National Anti-Corruption Commission (CONAC) is legally required to lead Cameroon's national policy for monitoring, preventing, and eliminating corruption in both the public and private sectors. Promoting integrity and transparency in governance is the commission's mandate under its founding decree. CONAC's role is solely consultative and investigative; it does not have the capacity to make arrests or independently start criminal cases, while having broad capabilities to acquire intelligence and look into administrative wrongdoing.

== Leadership ==
The name of the chairman that has been in charge of the National Anti corruption commission since 2011 is Dr. Dieudonné Massi Gams. In May 2026, Massi Gams’s was elected as President of the Association of Anti-Corruption Agencies in Commonwealth Africa (AAACoA) during its 16th regional summit in Yaoundé.
