= National Anti-Corruption Commission (Saudi Arabia) =

Anti Corruption agency of Saudi Arabia

National Anti-corruption Commission

Agency overview
- Jurisdiction: Saudi Arabia
- Headquarters: Riyadh
- Website: http://www.nazaha.gov.sa/

The National Anti-Corruption Commission (Nazaha; Arabic: هيئة الرقابة ومكافحة الفساد) is a Saudi governmental anti-corruption agency that was launched during the 2017–2019 Saudi Arabian purge. The Commission was initially headed by Saudi ruler Mohammed bin Salman.

The purge helped centralize political powers in the hands of Mohammed bin Salman and undermine the pre-existing structure of consensus-based governance among Saudi elites. The arrests resulted in the final sidelining of the faction of King Abdullah, and Mohammed bin Salman's complete consolidation of control of all three branches of the security forces. It also cemented bin Salman's supremacy over business elites in Saudi Arabia and resulted in a mass seizure of assets by the bin Salman regime.

In January 2026, the agency arrested 127 people on corruption charges.
