= Louis Ortiz =

American impressionist of Barack Obama

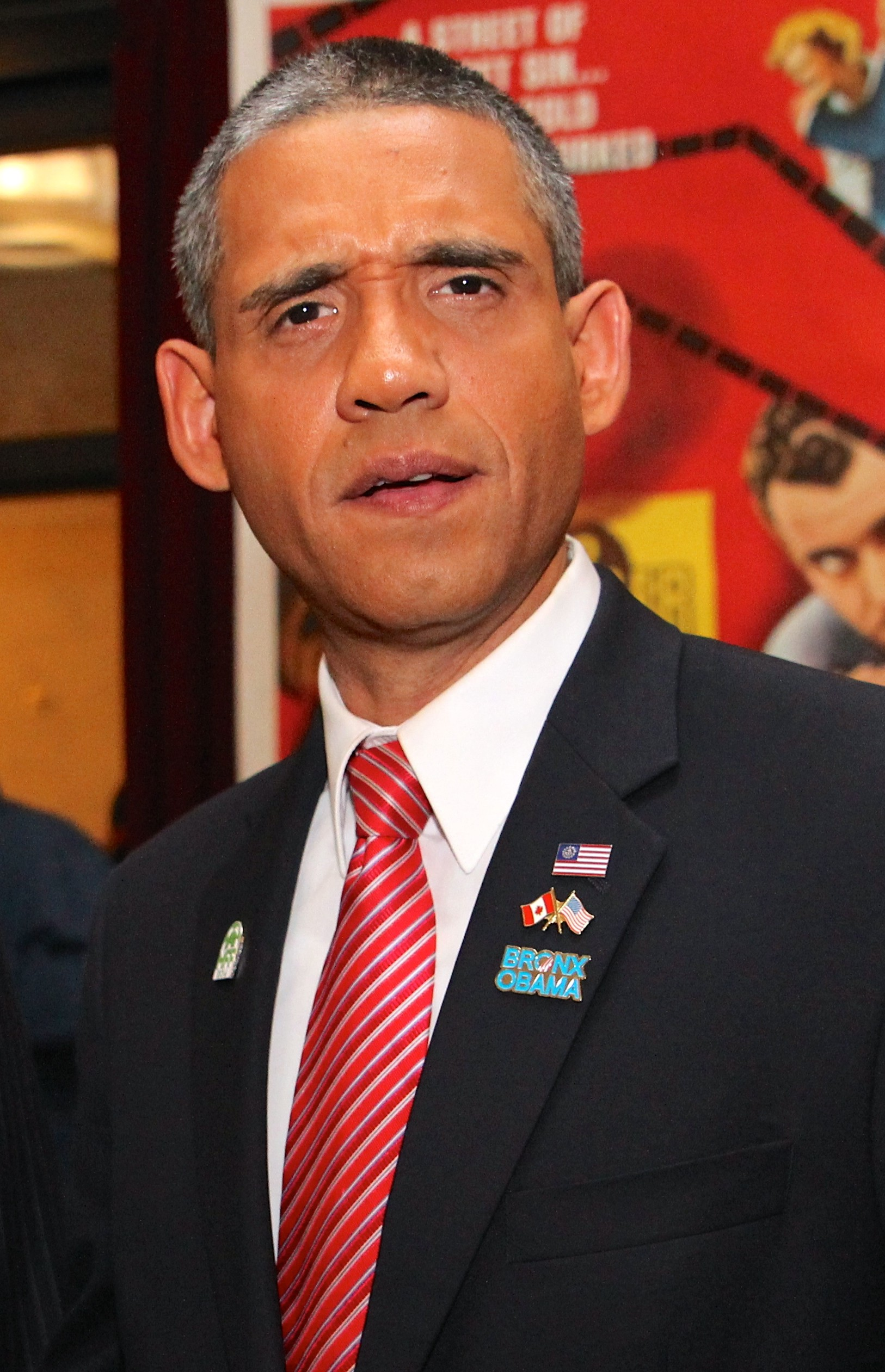
Bronx Obama at the 2014 MontClair film festival

Louis Ortiz (also known as "Bronx Obama") is an American impressionist of Barack Obama. A former field technician for Verizon, Ortiz is the subject of Bronx Obama, a Kickstarter-financed documentary produced and directed by Ryan Murdock. He also played several background characters in the Star Trek franchise, notably Ensign Culhane in Star Trek Voyager; he also has one credited appearance in Star Trek as a Klingon warrior.

== Career beginnings ==
In August 2008, Ortiz was unemployed, collecting worker's compensation, and playing in pool tournaments for money. Friends jokingly told Ortiz that his picture was on the front page of the New York Daily News. When Ortiz looked at the newspaper he failed to see the resemblance. Ortiz went to play pool at the Williamsbridge Tavern in the Bronx when Pat, his friend and bartender, noted the similarity to Obama. Ortiz, who had facial hair, still couldn't picture the similarity. While many people commented to Ortiz about his likeness to Obama, Pat was the first to mention and encourage Ortiz to use the likeness as a financial opportunity. Ortiz, who was unemployed for a year and in desperate need of money, was intrigued by the possibilities. He shaved his facial hair, and was dumbfounded by the similarity. Pat, who had some experience in modeling, helped Ortiz develop a plan to capitalize on his likeness to the Democratic presidential nominee. Ortiz managed to gather enough money for head shots and a new suit. With the help from friends at the bar, he contacted agents and sent resumes and head shots. He practiced his impersonation in the mirror for several weeks then decided it was time to make his first public appearance. September 21, 2008 was the date of the last game to be played at the old Yankee Stadium. Ortiz, costumed in his suit, ascended into the bleachers with several friends, many of whom were retired policemen who pretended they were escorting the actual Barack Obama. Ortiz said it wasn't long before he drew attention from the crowd and grabbed the attention of the audience.

== Career highlights ==
Ortiz contracted with a talent agency, William Gold Entertainment, that has increased his status. He was also on an episode of This American Life. He had a New York Times feature and a segment on The Jeff Probst Show on the CBS television channel. He also appeared in the Japanese feature film Saraba Itoshi no Daitouryou (Good Bye Dear President). He has done commercials for Netherland-based Rabobank, South Korean satellite television provider, Skylife, and appeared in a Times Square billboard campaign for the car manufacturer, Hyundai. Ortiz has been a guest star in myISH's The Hillywood Show, The Onion, MTV's Matt's Apartment, Four Shaw Entertainment's Tomorrow: The Film, and Australian web series, The Nobel Funk Off.

Ortiz's career as an Obama impersonator was the subject of the 2014 documentary film Bronx Obama by Ryan Murdock. The film was developed under the name The Audacity of Louis Ortiz; however, the film was re-titled before its release.
