= Brady Feigl =

American baseball player (born 1990)

- Pitcher
- Born: December 27, 1990 (age 35); Severn, Maryland, U.S.
- Batted: Right Threw: Left

MLB debut
- August 26, 2024, for the Pittsburgh Pirates

Last MLB appearance
- August 26, 2024, for the Pittsburgh Pirates

MLB statistics
- Win–loss record: 0–0
- Earned run average: 32.40
- Strikeouts: 0
- Stats at Baseball Reference

Teams
- Pittsburgh Pirates (2024)

Brady Matthew Feigl (born December 27, 1990) is an American former professional baseball pitcher. He played in Major League Baseball (MLB) for the Pittsburgh Pirates.

== Career ==
Feigl attended Old Mill High School in Millersville, Maryland. Feigl played college baseball at Mount St. Mary's University from 2009 to 2012. He missed his junior year in 2011 due to a torn labrum.

=== Atlanta Braves ===
A year after graduating college, Feigl signed with the Atlanta Braves as an undrafted free agent in October 2013 after he impressed a Braves scout at Mount St. Mary's Scout Day. Feigl was signed that year as a free agent by Braves' scout Gene Kerns. He made his professional debut in 2014 with the Rome Braves and after pitching to a 3.50 ERA in 43 2/3 innings, was promoted to the Lynchburg Hillcats where he went 3–2 with a 2.05 ERA in 22 innings.

In 2015, the Braves invited Feigl to spring training, where he competed for a spot on the opening day roster. Though he spent most of spring training in minor league camp, Feigl was viewed as having a good chance of making the team, due to the release of James Russell. Feigl instead began the 2015 season with the Gwinnett Braves, where he injured his elbow in his Triple–A debut against the Durham Bulls on April 10. Eleven days later, Feigl underwent Tommy John surgery, performed by James Andrews, causing him to miss all of the 2015 season. He pitched in only six games in 2016, three with the GCL Braves and three with the Danville Braves.

=== Texas Rangers ===
On December 8, 2016, the Braves traded Feigl and Tyrell Jenkins to the Texas Rangers for Luke Jackson. In 2017, he began the season with the Down East Wood Ducks and was later promoted to the Frisco RoughRiders, posting a combined 4–1 record and 3.81 ERA in 59 innings pitched between both teams. In 2018 Feigl split the season between Frisco and the Round Rock Express, posting a combined 6–1 record, 1.53 ERA, with 37 strikeouts in 58 2/3 innings pitched. Feigl received a non-roster invitation to 2019 major-league spring training and was assigned to the Nashville Sounds of the Triple-A Pacific Coast League for the 2019 season. He went 2–0 with a 3.13 ERA in just 23 innings between Nashville and the AZL Rangers, due to non-disclosed injuries.

=== San Diego Padres ===
On December 12, 2019, Feigl was selected by the San Diego Padres in the minor league phase of the 2019 Rule 5 draft. Feigl did not play in a game in 2020 due to the cancellation of the minor league season because of the COVID-19 pandemic. Feigl did not appear for a Padres affiliate in 2021 due to injury and elected free agency on November 7, 2021, without having appeared in a game for the Padres organization.

=== Long Island Ducks ===
On March 17, 2022, Feigl signed with the Long Island Ducks of the Atlantic League of Professional Baseball. Feigl made 9 appearances for Long Island in 2022, posting a 1.17 ERA with 8 strikeouts in 7 2/3 innings pitched. He became a free agent following the season.

=== Frederick Atlantic League Team ===
On April 18, 2023, Feigl signed with the then-unnamed Frederick Atlantic League Team in the Atlantic League of Professional Baseball. In 16 appearances for Frederick, he registered a 6.28 ERA with 20 strikeouts in 14 1/3 innings of work. On June 10, Feigl was released by the team.

=== Lexington Counter Clocks ===
On June 13, 2023, Feigl signed with the Lexington Counter Clocks of the Atlantic League of Professional Baseball. In 34 appearances for Lexington, he posted a 2.36 ERA with 43 strikeouts in 34 1/3 innings pitched.

=== Pittsburgh Pirates ===
On October 5, 2023, Feigl signed with the Pericos de Puebla of the Mexican League. However, on January 21, 2024, Feigl signed a minor league contract with the Pittsburgh Pirates. In 33 appearances for the Triple–A Indianapolis Indians, he compiled a 7–2 record and 3.83 ERA with 62 strikeouts over 51 2/3 innings pitched. On August 25, Feigl was selected to the 40-man roster and promoted to the major leagues for the first time. He debuted the following day against the Chicago Cubs, allowing six runs on seven hits in 1 2/3 innings. Feigl was designated for assignment on August 27. He cleared waivers and was sent outright to Indianapolis on August 30. Feigl elected free agency following the season on November 4.

=== Minnesota Twins ===
On February 21, 2025, Feigl signed a minor league contract with the Minnesota Twins. In 14 appearances split between the Triple-A St. Paul Saints and Single-A Fort Myers Mighty Mussels, he posted a cumulative 2-1 record and 5.74 ERA with 17 strikeouts and two saves across 15 2/3 innings pitched. Feigl was released by the Twins organization on August 27.

=== Toros de Tijuana ===
On April 29, 2026, Feigl signed with the Toros de Tijuana of the Mexican League.

== Doppelgänger ==
Brady Gregory Feigl played Minor League Baseball from the 2018 to 2021 seasons, concurrently with Brady Matthew Feigl. The two Brady Feigls are considered doppelgängers as they are both pitchers and have red hair, bushy red beards, thick glasses, and identical height of 6 ft 4 in (1.93 m), though they have a 5 year age difference. They were first mistaken for one another in 2015 by staff at the doctor's office where they both got Tommy John surgery performed by the same surgeon, James Andrews. Neither had previously known any Feigls outside their own families. In 2019, the Brady Feigls shared their DNA test results on Inside Edition. Though both had 53 percent Germanic ancestry, they were not related. "We're still brothers in a way", said Brady Feigl. "And we'll always be Brady Feigl", added the other Brady Feigl.
