= Nevada State Route 318 =

Highway in Nevada

State Route 318
- Silver State Classic Challenge Highway; Sunnyside Road
- SR 318 highlighted in red

Route information
- Maintained by NDOT
- Length: 110.762 mi (178.254 km)
- Existed: 1976–present
- History: SR 38 by 1935 & SR 38A by 1937; All SR 38 by 1946; Renumbered SR 318 in 1976

Major junctions
- South end: US 93 in Crystal Springs
- SR 375 in Crystal Springs; SR 895 north of Preston
- North end: US 6 northwest of Preston

Location
- Country: United States
- State: Nevada
- Counties: Lincoln, Nye, White Pine

Highway system
- Nevada State Highway System; Interstate; US; State; Pre‑1976; Scenic
← SR 317	→ SR 319

State Route 318 (SR 318) is a state highway in eastern Nevada. It is often used as a shortcut for long-distance traffic along U.S. Route 93, bypassing the longer and less direct route U.S. Route 93 follows between Ely and Crystal Springs. The highway was established in the 1930s as State Route 38 and State Route 38A, and was renumbered to SR 318 in 1976. At a total of 110.762 miles (178.254 km), it is the longest state route in Nevada. The road is used for open speed highway races twice a year.

== Route description ==
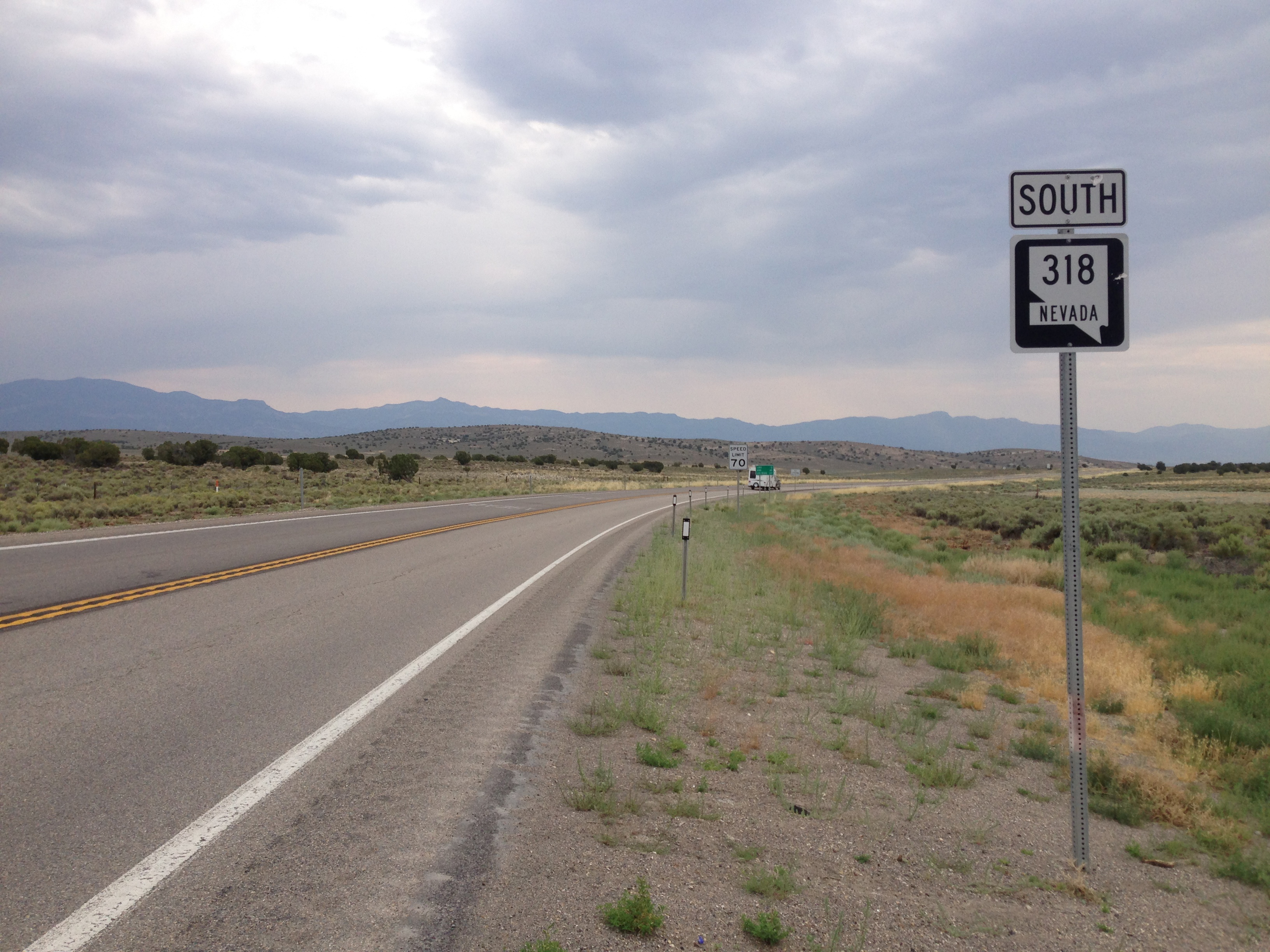
First reassurance sign along southbound SR 318

SR 318 begins on U.S. Route 93 (US 93) at Crystal Springs in Lincoln County. From there, it travels north through Hiko. SR 318 generally parallels the route of the White River on its trek northward. The highway travels through Nye County and the town of Sunnyside. The highway then enters White Pine County and serves the community of Lund. SR 318 ends at a junction on US 6 approximately 25 miles (40 km) southwest of Ely.

The racing video game Need for Speed: ProStreet features a portion of the highway as a racing track for Speed Challenges.

== History ==
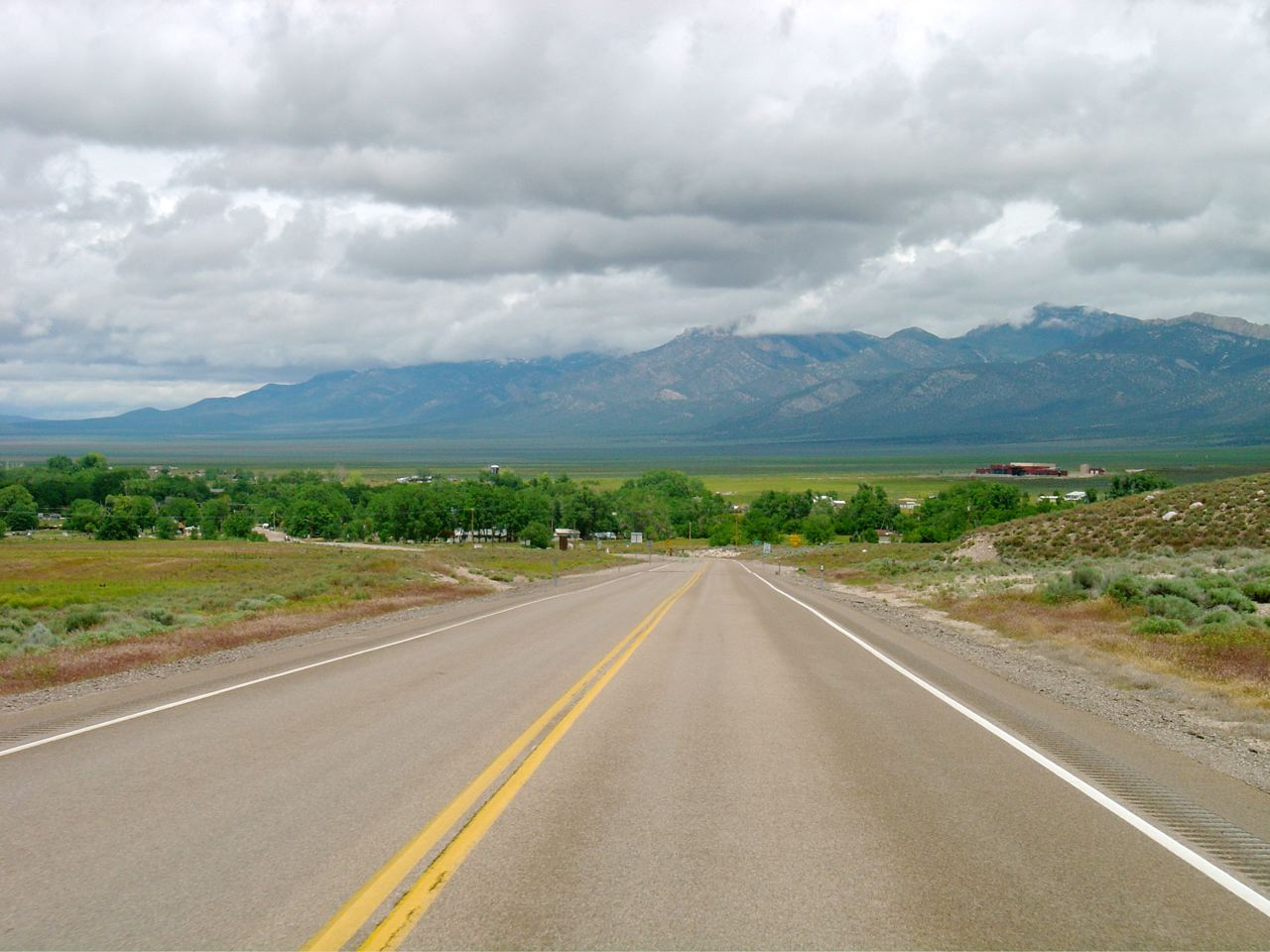
Looking north on SR 318 towards Lund

A county road approximating the course of the present highway was indicated on state maps by 1933. As of 1935, State Route 38 was designated along the north end of the county road, between State Route 4 (later US 6) at Barnes and the town of Lund. This 12-mile (19 km) segment of highway was completely paved by 1936. The remaining unimproved portions of the county road was made part of the state highway system by 1937—the five miles (8.0 km) from US 93 to Hiko became the first iteration of SR 60, while the remaining 115 miles (185 km) was designated SR 38A. By 1939, however, SR 60 was removed and replaced by SR 38A—the southern end of the route was also shifted more easterly by this time. In 1942, the entire 107 miles (172 km) length of SR 38A between US 93 and Lund had been graded to more closely follow the White River. The SR 38A designation was completely absorbed into SR 38 by 1946—by this time, SR 38 was approximately 120 miles (190 km) long.

SR 38 would remain relatively unchanged, except for gradual pavement upgrades, for several years. However, on July 1, 1976, Nevada began a major renumbering of all its state highway system. In that process, SR 38 was rechristened as the new State Route 318. The changes were first noted on the 1978 edition of the official state highway map. The route number conversion was completed by 1982—by that time, the entire highway was completely paved.

At the request of White Pine County's Board of Tourism and Recreation, the Nevada Board of Transportation renamed SR 318 from "Sunnyside Road" to the "Silver State Classic Challenge Highway" on May 24, 2012. More than 100 miles of the highway, between Lund, Nevada and Hiko, Nevada are closed twice a year for the Nevada Open Road Challenge and Silver State Classic Challenge road races.

On June 24, 2020, part of the highway was closed near Lund, Nevada as the Brown Fire grew, burning almost parallel to the highway.

== Major intersections ==
Note: Mileposts in Nevada reset at county lines; the start and end mileposts for each county are given in the county column.

County	Location	mi	km	Destinations	Notes
Lincoln; 0.00–49.42	Crystal Springs	0.00	0.00	US 93 – Las Vegas, Ely	Southern terminus
Lincoln; 0.00–49.42	Crystal Springs			SR 375 north (Extraterrestrial Highway) – Rachel	Southern terminus of SR 375
Nye; 0.00–38.78	No major junctions				
White Pine; 0.00–22.56				SR 895 south – Preston	Northern terminus of SR 895
White Pine; 0.00–22.56		22.56	36.31	US 6 – Ely, Tonopah	Northern terminus
1.000 mi = 1.609 km; 1.000 km = 0.621 mi
