= Nevada State Route 319 =

Highway in Nevada

State Route 319
- Panaca–Modena, Utah Road
- SR 319 highlighted in red

Route information
- Maintained by NDOT
- Length: 20.914 mi (33.658 km)
- Existed: 1976–present

Major junctions
- West end: US 93 near Panaca
- East end: SR-56 at Utah state line west of Modena, UT

Location
- Country: United States
- State: Nevada

Highway system
- Nevada State Highway System; Interstate; US; State; Pre‑1976; Scenic
← SR 318	→ SR 320

State Route 319 (SR 319) is a state highway in Lincoln County, Nevada. The route connects the town of Panaca to Modena, Utah. SR 319 has been part of the state highway system since at least 1932, and was part of the longer State Route 25 prior to the late 1970s.

== Route description ==
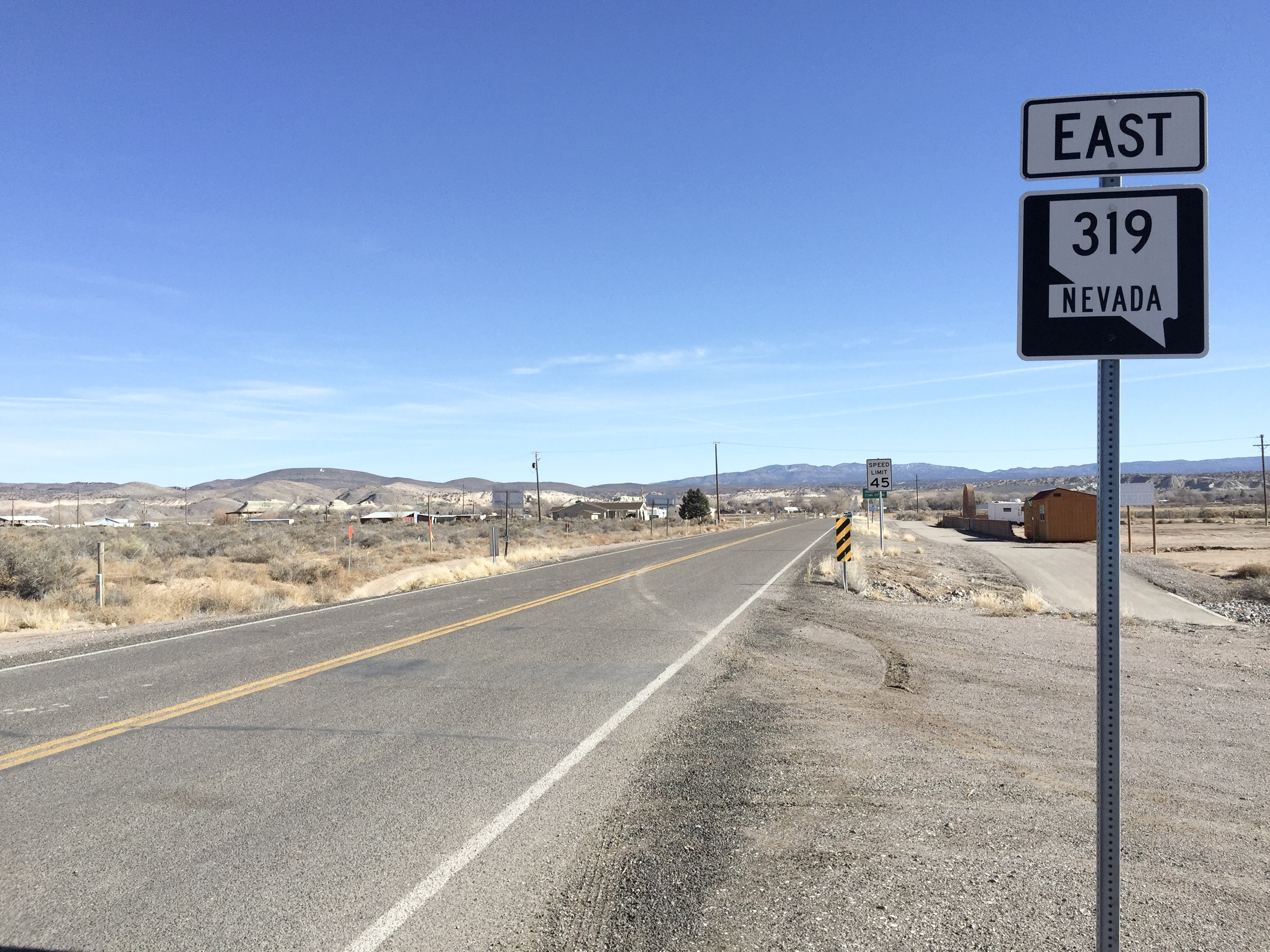
View from the west end of SR 319 looking eastbound

State Route 319 begins at a junction with U.S. Route 93 near Cathedral Gorge State Park. After a short distance, the highway passes through the town of Panaca on F Street. Exiting the town, the route continues eastward about 9 miles (14 km) before turning slightly southeast to climb the 6,718-foot (2,048 m) Panaca Summit. SR 319 turns eastward again as it heads towards the Utah state line. The highway continues northeast as Utah State Route 56 to Modena.

== History ==
SR 319 was formerly the eastern section of State Route 25.

A pathway connecting Panaca and Modena appears on state maps by 1927 as a county road. This route had been improved to a graded highway and designated State Route 25 by 1932. The entire route was paved by 1951.

By 1933, State Route 25 was extended westward. It followed US 93/State Route 7 south through Caliente and west to Crystal Springs, where it headed northwest towards U.S. Route 6/State Route 4 ending near Tonopah. The western segment of route underwent numerous realignments over the next few several years, with the western terminus shifting eastward on US 6 to Warm Springs by the time the highway was paved in 1958.

Once paved, both parts of State Route 25 remained unchanged until July 1, 1976. On that date, Nevada authorized the renumbering of all its state highways. During that process, the eastern section of SR 25 became the new State Route 319 while the western segment became State Route 375. The changes were first noted on the 1978 edition of the official state highway map.

== Major intersections ==
The entire route is in Lincoln County.

Location	mi	km	Destinations	Notes
Panaca	50.00	80.47	US 93 – Ely, Las Vegas	
	70.91	114.12	SR-56	Continuation beyond Utah state line
1.000 mi = 1.609 km; 1.000 km = 0.621 mi
