= Crystal Springs, Nevada =

- Ghost town
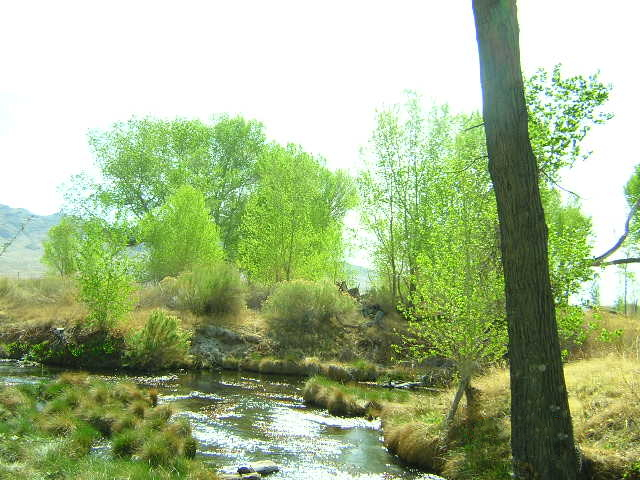
- The springs

- Location within Nevada Location within the United States
- Coordinates: 37°31′54″N 115°14′02″W
- Country: United States
- State: Nevada
- County: Lincoln
- Elevation: 3,819 ft (1,164 m)
- Time zone: UTC-8 (Pacific (PST))
  - Summer (DST): UTC-7 (PDT)
- GNIS feature ID: 858593

Nevada Historical Marker
- Reference no.: 205

Crystal Springs is a ghost town in the Pahranagat Valley region of Lincoln County, Nevada in the United States. The ghost town is located at the junction of State Route 318 and State Route 375 (Extraterrestrial Highway), just northwest of U.S. Route 93. It is a popular destination for passersby who want to visit the towns of Hiko and Rachel. The namesake of the ghost town, the Crystal Springs, lies nearby; it is a large group of marshes and springs along the White River. Crystal Springs provides irrigation for multiple nearby ranches and farms, some of which lie over 5 miles away from the springs.

The ghost town is marked as Nevada Historical Marker 205 (Crystal Springs).

== History ==
The earliest reported uses of the spring were by a Native American village. The springs provided water for people traveling the Mormon Trail.

In 1865, Crystal Springs was the first area in Lincoln County where mining grade silver ore was discovered. This led to Crystal Springs becoming the first county seat of Lincoln County from 1866 to 1867, although it was later replaced by Hiko.

== Hot springs ==
The Crystal Springs thermal spring has a water temperature of 81 °F.
