= Alamo, Nevada =

Unincorporated town in the State of Nevada, United States

- Unincorporated town
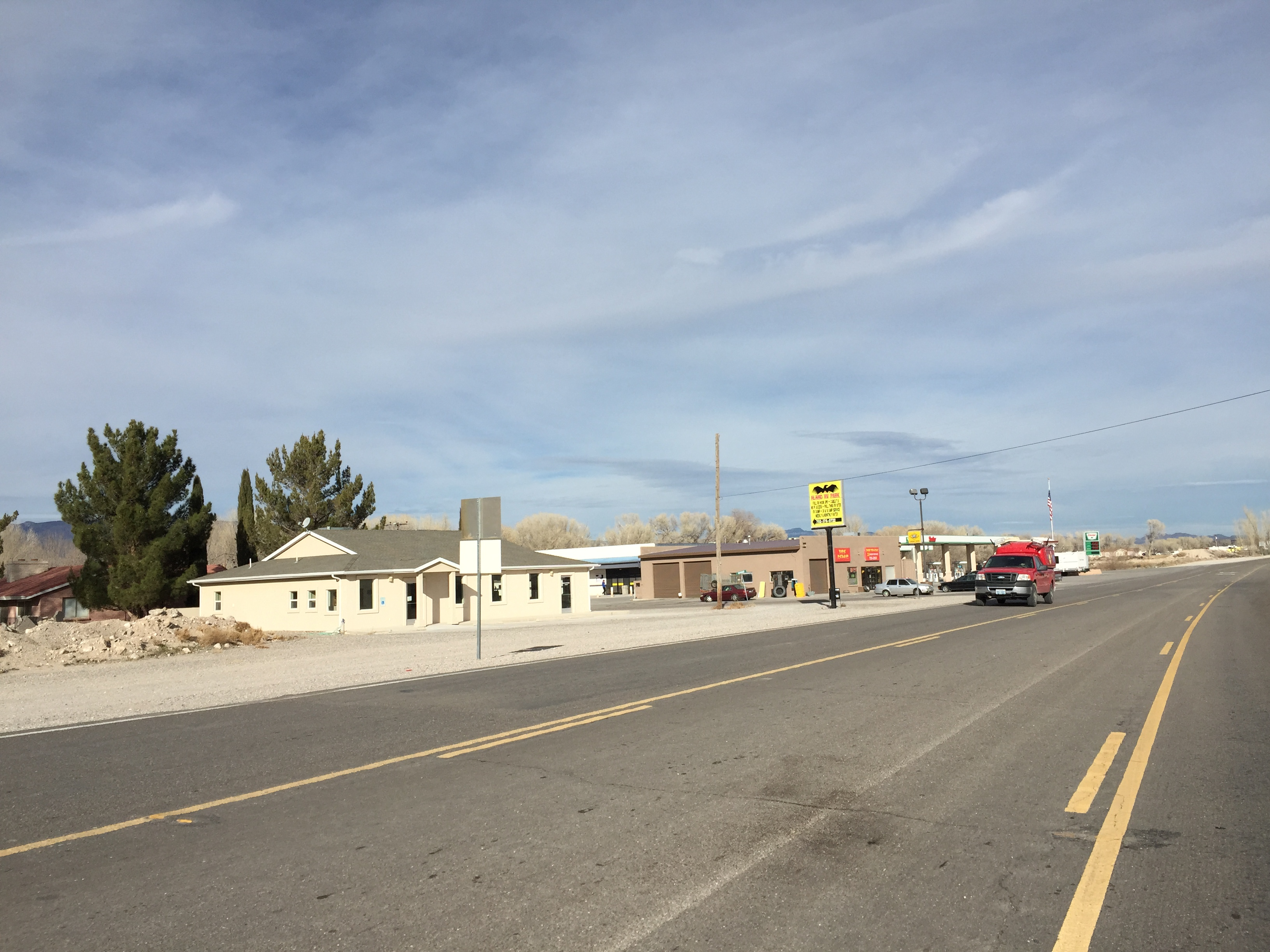

- Location within Nevada Location within the United States
- Coordinates: 37°21′54″N 115°09′52″W
- Country: United States
- State: Nevada
- County: Lincoln

Area
  - Total: 6.35 sq mi (16.45 km^{2})
  - Land: 6.35 sq mi (16.45 km^{2})
  - Water: 0 sq mi (0.00 km^{2})
- Elevation: 3,458 ft (1,054 m)

Population (2020)
  - Total: 785
  - Density: 123.6/sq mi (47.73/km^{2})
- Time zone: UTC−8 (Pacific (PST))
  - Summer (DST): UTC−7 (PDT)
- ZIP code: 89001
- FIPS code: 32-00500
- GNIS feature ID: 2583909

Alamo is an unincorporated town in Lincoln County, Nevada, United States, about 90 miles (140 km) north of Las Vegas along U.S. Route 93. As of the 2010 census it had a population of 1,080.

== History ==
A post office has been in operation at Alamo since 1905. The community was named in commemoration of the Battle of the Alamo. A large share of the first settlers were Mormons.

The LDS church Sunday School of Alamo in 1909

Alamo banned alcohol sales due to the religious roots and principles of the settlers. Many of the residents are members of The Church of Jesus Christ of Latter-day Saints, and their faith "preaches abstinence from alcohol". In 2022, the town board proposed allowing alcohol sales in gas stations and supermarkets but continue to restrict bars.

== Geography ==
Alamo lies in the Pahranagat Valley. Its economy is dependent primarily upon ranching. The closest attraction is the Pahranagat National Wildlife Refuge.

Between Alamo and the town of Rachel is the site of the Devonian Alamo Impact Breccia.

According to the U.S. Census Bureau, the Alamo census-designated place has an area of 30.3 square miles (78.4 km^{2}), all of it land.

=== Climate ===
Climate data for Alamo, Nevada (Elevation 3,449ft)
| Month | Jan | Feb | Mar | Apr | May | Jun | Jul | Aug | Sep | Oct | Nov | Dec | Year |
|---|---|---|---|---|---|---|---|---|---|---|---|---|---|
| Record high °F (°C) | 76 (24) | 83 (28) | 85 (29) | 95 (35) | 105 (41) | 112 (44) | 114 (46) | 116 (47) | 108 (42) | 100 (38) | 86 (30) | 76 (24) | 116 (47) |
| Mean daily maximum °F (°C) | 51.2 (10.7) | 56.3 (13.5) | 64.5 (18.1) | 74.4 (23.6) | 82.9 (28.3) | 93.1 (33.9) | 100.1 (37.8) | 96.5 (35.8) | 90.3 (32.4) | 77.9 (25.5) | 64.2 (17.9) | 54.2 (12.3) | 75.5 (24.2) |
| Mean daily minimum °F (°C) | 21.2 (−6.0) | 25.4 (−3.7) | 29.6 (−1.3) | 36.6 (2.6) | 42.9 (6.1) | 49.8 (9.9) | 57.3 (14.1) | 55.5 (13.1) | 46.3 (7.9) | 37.5 (3.1) | 28.3 (−2.1) | 23.7 (−4.6) | 37.9 (3.3) |
| Record low °F (°C) | −9 (−23) | −6 (−21) | 11 (−12) | 14 (−10) | 20 (−7) | 25 (−4) | 40 (4) | 33 (1) | 24 (−4) | 11 (−12) | 7 (−14) | 0 (−18) | −9 (−23) |
| Average precipitation inches (mm) | 0.65 (17) | 0.64 (16) | 0.69 (18) | 0.56 (14) | 0.49 (12) | 0.16 (4.1) | 0.57 (14) | 0.71 (18) | 0.27 (6.9) | 0.53 (13) | 0.45 (11) | 0.55 (14) | 6.27 (159) |
| Average snowfall inches (cm) | 3.6 (9.1) | 1.2 (3.0) | 0.8 (2.0) | 0.3 (0.76) | 0.1 (0.25) | 0 (0) | 0 (0) | 0 (0) | 0 (0) | 0 (0) | 0.2 (0.51) | 1.3 (3.3) | 7.4 (19) |
Source: The Western Regional Climate Center

== Demographics ==
Historical population
| Census | Pop. | Note | %± |
|---|---|---|---|
| 2020 | 785 | | — |
U.S. Decennial Census

== Tourism ==
Alamo attracts tourists and truckers traveling from Las Vegas to northern Nevada and Idaho. Attractions include the nearby warm springs, wildlife refuge, Extraterrestrial Highway, Area 51, The Black Mailbox, and Stonehenge replica RyanHenge. Gas stations in Alamo cater to these tourists by offering alien memorabilia. There are two truck stops, the Alamo Sinclair, the Ash Springs Shell, that offer large diesel filling areas to attract passing truckers. There are also two open motels in Alamo, the Sunset View Inn and the Alamo Inn.

== Transportation ==
- Alamo Landing Field

== Education ==
Public education is provided by the Lincoln County School District, with offices in Panaca, Nevada. There are three schools in the valley.

| School | Grades |
|---|---|
| Pahranagat Valley Elementary School | Pre K–5 |
| Pahranagat Valley Middle School | 6-8 |
| Pahranagat Valley High School | 9-12 |

== Religion ==
There are three different religious denominations with churches in Alamo:

- Christian Bible Fellowship Church
- The Church of Jesus Christ of Latter-day Saints, who were early settlers of this area
- Trinity Assembly of God

== Cityscape and media ==
Alamo has a police force, a volunteer fire department, phone and internet services, a medical clinic, and a public library. Alamo's first radio station, KQLN 91.3 FM, went on the air on November 17, 2010, but the station's license was cancelled at licensee's request, effective on July 2, 2013. The Lincoln County Record, the area's weekly newspaper, is based in Alamo.
