= Anderson Field (Nevada) =

Coordinates: 36.142°N 115.149°W

- IATA: none; ICAO: none

Summary
- Airport type: Municipal airfield
- Owner: Robert Hausler (1920-1925); Earl & Leon Rockwell (1925-1929)
- Operator: W.R. Hausler (1920-1925)
- Serves: Las Vegas
- Opened: November 25, 1920
- Closed: 1929

Map

Anderson Field (Rockwell Field) was the first airport to serve Las Vegas, Nevada. The north boundary of the airfield was the present day Sahara Avenue, with the present day Paradise Road serving as the western boundary.

== History ==
Construction on the field began when the surface was leveled.

The airfield opened on Thanksgiving Day, 1920.

The land for the airport was purchased on December 21, 1925, by the Rockwell Brothers. Airmail service was initiated on April 17, 1926, from Los Angeles, California, by Western Air Express. Western continued to use the field until 1929 when they moved to the new Alamo Landing Field at the site of the current Nellis Air Force Base.

== See also ==
Nye County, Nevada, also has a geographic flat called Anderson Field.
