= Medlen =

Medlen is a surname of English descent, derived from Medlin. Notable people with the surname include:

- Eric Medlen (1973–2007), American racing car driver
- Kris Medlen (born 1985), American baseball player
- Pamela Medlen, Australian journalist
