= Sunnyside, Nevada =

Unincorporated community in Nevada, US

- Unincorporated community
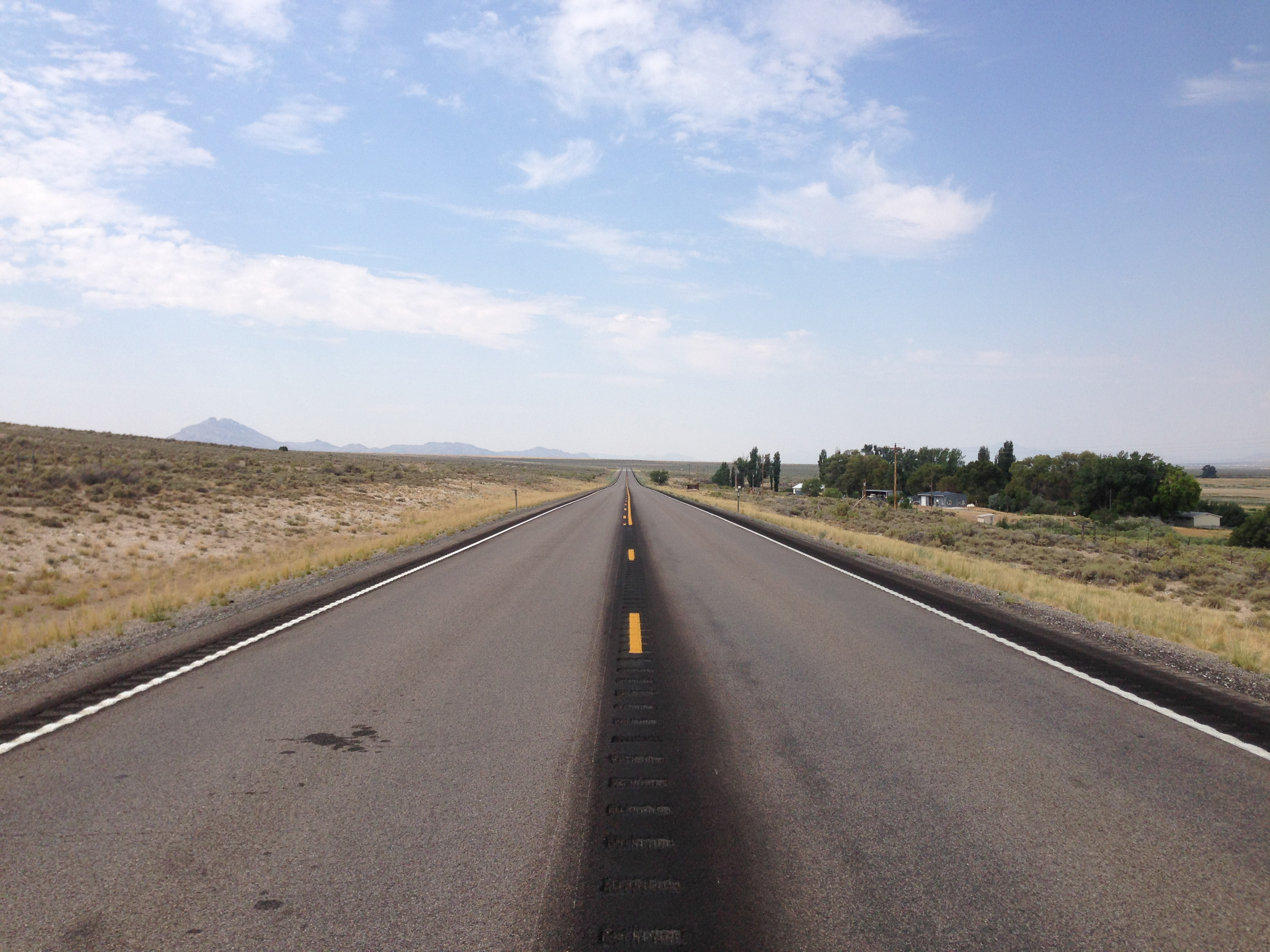
- View south along SR 318 in Sunnyside

- Location within Nevada
- Coordinates: 38°25′24″N 115°01′16″W
- Country: United States
- State: Nevada
- District: Nye County
- Elevation: 5,328 ft (1,624 m)
- Time zone: UTC-8 (Pacific)
  - Summer (DST): UTC-7 (PDT)

Sunnyside is a small unincorporated community in the White River Valley of eastern Nevada, near the southern terminus of the Egan Range. The site is located on State Route 318 approximately 31 miles by road south of Lund in White Pine County, the closest town, and 63 miles by road north of Hiko in Lincoln County.

== History and development ==
A Mr. Horton began ranching at the Sunnyside location sometime during the 1880s. A Mary Horton served as postmaster of a new post office established at this location on July 10, 1880, a station which would serve the entire White River Valley until January 31, 1933. The Hortons sold out to a John Whipple in 1904, who would also assume postmaster duties on September 27, 1917. In 1941, Sunnyside had a population of 27. John Whipple then sold the property to his son, Clair, who worked the property until they themselves sold out to the present owners in 1962.

== Attractions ==
The Adams-McGill, Cold Springs, Hay Meadow, Tule Field, and Whipple reservoirs along the White river are all within fifteen miles of Sunnyside; further, these reservoirs are parts of the Wayne E. Kirch Wildlife Management Area.
