= Nevada State Route 6 =

U.S. Route 6 in Nevada

Nevada State Route 6 (1919)

Nevada State Route 6

Nevada State Route 6 may refer to:

- U.S. Route 6 in Nevada
- Nevada State Route 6 (1919), which existed until it was replaced by U.S. Route 91 on November 11, 1926
