= Nevada State Route 375 =

Highway in Nevada

State Route 375
- Extraterrestrial Highway; Warm Springs Road
- SR 375 highlighted in red

Route information
- Maintained by NDOT
- Length: 98.443 mi (158.429 km)
- Existed: 1976–present
- History: SR 25 by 1933; became SR 375 in 1976; highway named in 1996.

Major junctions
- South end: SR 318 at Crystal Springs
- North end: US 6 at Warm Springs

Location
- Country: United States
- State: Nevada
- Counties: Nye, Lincoln

Highway system
- Nevada State Highway System; Interstate; US; State; Pre‑1976; Scenic
← SR 374	→ SR 376

State Route 375 (SR 375) is a 98.414-mile (158.382 km) state highway in Nye and Lincoln counties in south-central Nevada, United States. The highway stretches from State Route 318 at Crystal Springs northwest to U.S. Route 6 (US 6) at Warm Springs. The route travels through mostly unoccupied desert terrain, with much of its alignment paralleling the northern edges of the Nellis Air Force Range. The road originally traversed through what is now the northern reaches of the air force range in the 1930s, when it was previously designated State Route 25A and later part of State Route 25.

The top-secret Area 51 government base is near SR 375, and many travelers have reported UFO observations and other strange alien activity along this road. Such stories prompted the state to officially designate the route as the Extraterrestrial Highway in 1996. The small town of Rachel, located near the midpoint of the highway, caters to tourists, geocachers, and UFO seekers with alien-themed businesses. Although the area receives some tourism due to alleged extraterrestrial activity, SR 375 remains a lightly traveled route.

== Route description ==
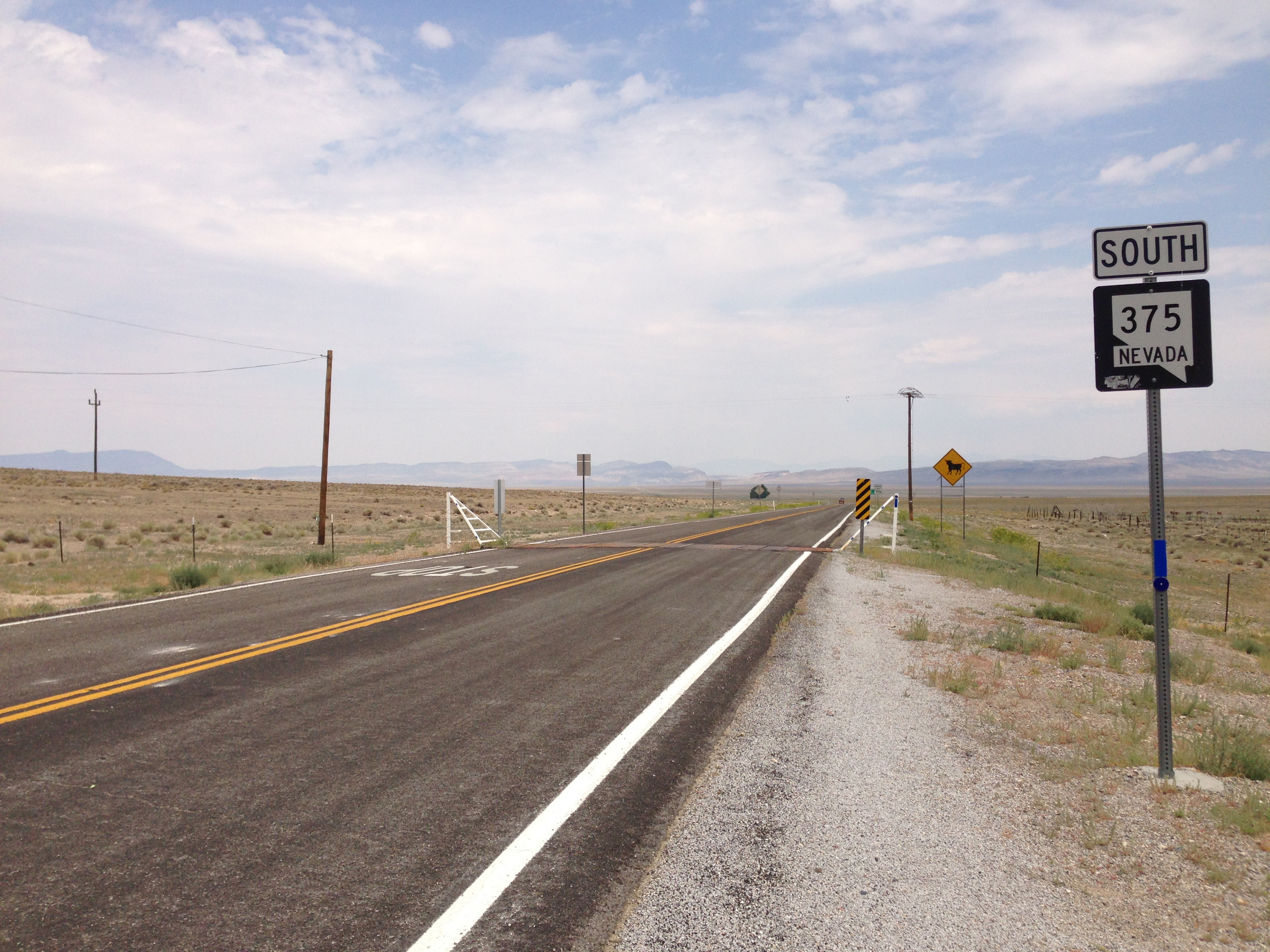
View from the north end of SR 375 looking southbound, July 2014

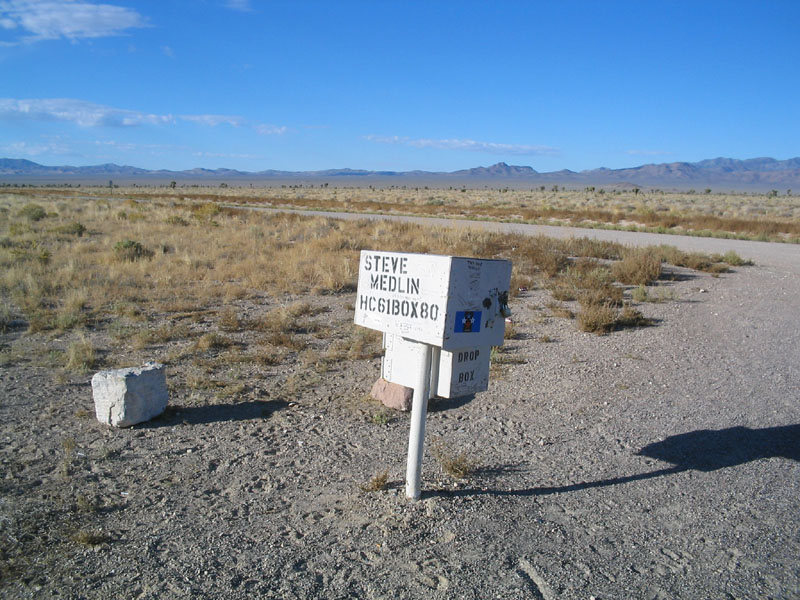
The "black mailbox", October 2005

State Route 375 begins at a "Y" junction with State Route 318 at Crystal Springs, a ghost town in the northern end of the Pahranagat Valley in the center of Lincoln County. The site, which is little more than the junction and a few trees, functions as a rest area. From Crystal Springs, the highway curves southwest to pass between the Pahrangat and Mount Irish ranges to ascend 5,592-foot (1,704 m) Hancock Summit.

Descending the summit, SR 375 nears the border of the Nellis Air Force Range. As the highway heads northwest through Tikaboo Valley, it meets Mail Box Road. It used to be marked by a single postal drop known as the "black mailbox": the dirt access road leads to the restricted lands surrounding Area 51. The original mailbox was a normal black mailbox; however, due to people constantly sifting through it, it was replaced by a more secure white mailbox. The name "Black Mailbox" still stuck. It was commonly used as a gathering place for UFO seekers, and two to three UFO sightings per week allegedly occur in the area. The mailbox was removed by its owner, Steve Medlin, due to continued vandalism. SR 375 continues heading northwest from the mailbox, climbing in elevation again to reach the top of Coyote Summit at 5,591 feet (1,704 m).

West of the summit, the Extraterrestrial Highway descends into the Sand Spring Valley and the community of Rachel becomes visible. The small town of about 50 residents is little more than homes and a few businesses. The Little A'Le'Inn (pronounced "alien") is the focal point of the town, providing a small motel, an alien-themed restaurant/bar, and extraterrestrial souvenirs. The civilian-run Area 51 Research Center, based out of a yellow house trailer and documenting paranormal activity in the area, closed in 2001. As of early 2021, there is now a gas station and general store open in Rachel, with a campground and RV hookup planned to open by spring of 2022.

Leaving Rachel, SR 375 continues northwest to enter Nye County. The route climbs out of Sand Spring Valley and heads over the 5,935-foot (1,809 m) Queen City Summit, the highest point on the highway. After passing the summit, the route descends into the southern end of Railroad Valley, curving nearly due north for several miles as it follows the base of Reveille Range. As the mountains subside, the road turns westward again to head to its northern terminus at the junction of US 6 at Warm Springs.

== History ==
=== Route development ===
SR 375 originated as State Route 25A and later became the western segment of State Route 25.

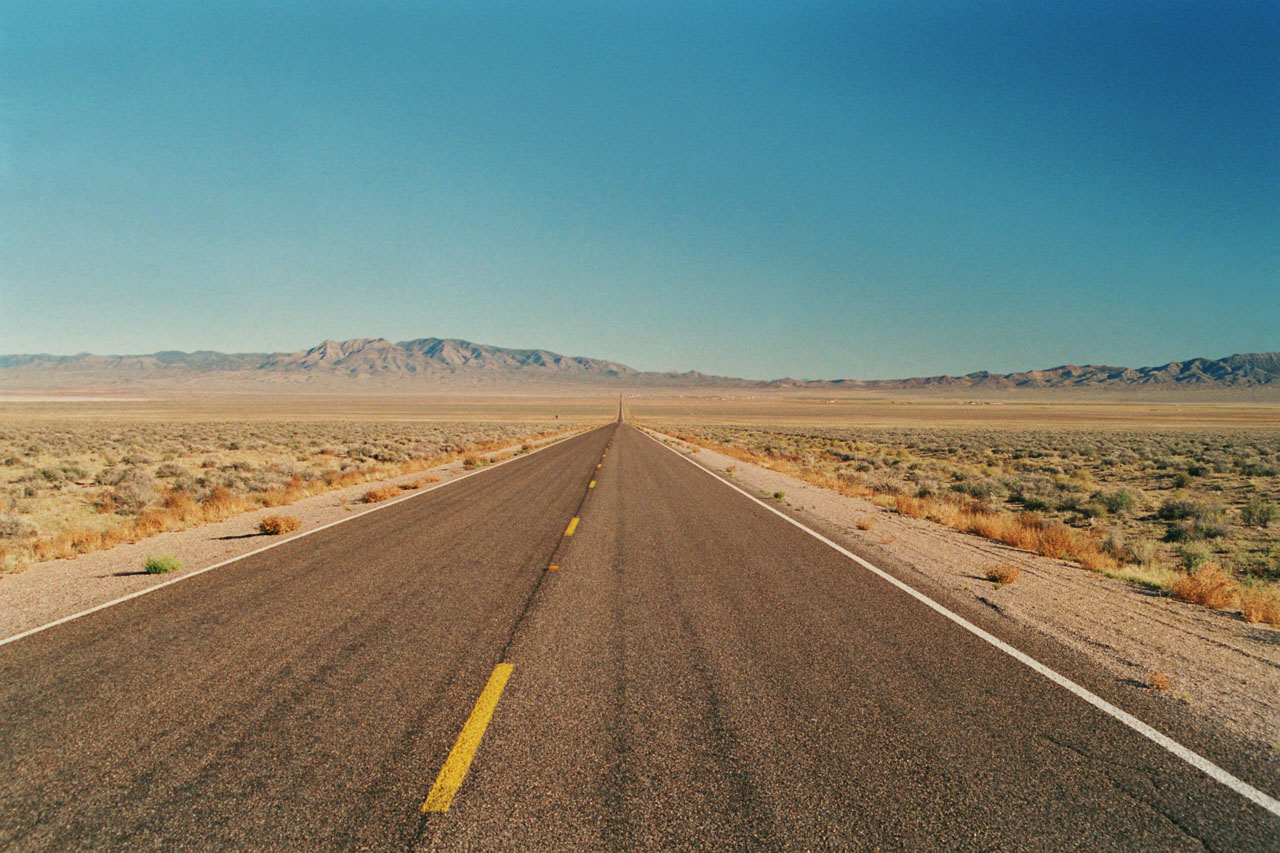
SR 375 passing through Sand Spring Valley, October 1997

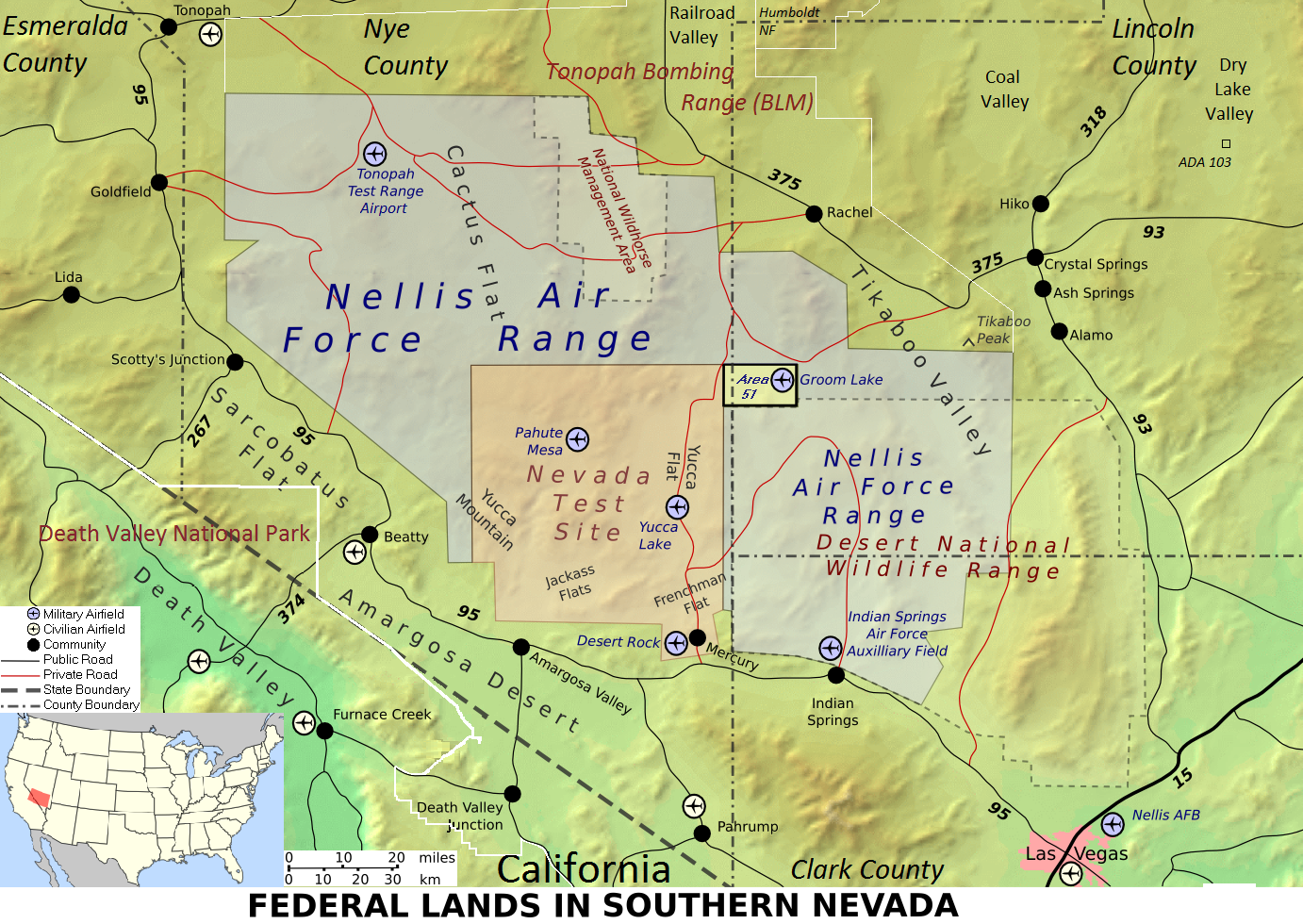
Map showing the location of Rachel, and State Route 375 as it passes north of Area 51

An unimproved road approximating the present alignment of State Route 375 came into existence by 1932. This route, christened State Route 25A, connected Crystal Springs to State Route 4 (now US 6) just east of Tonopah. By 1933, SR 25A had been renumbered to become a new western segment of State Route 25. The route underwent periodic realignments over the next few years, but the highway's terminal junctions remained mostly unchanged.

In 1942, SR 25 appeared to have a significant gap in its route. State maps from the time show a large area within Nye and Lincoln Counties where all roads had been removed. The route existed in one piece again by 1946, although it had been realigned northward and shortened to 111 miles (179 km). A sizable portion of SR 25 passing through the Tonopah U.S. Army Air Force Bombing Range (now the Nellis Air Force Range and Nevada Test Site) was restricted from public travel by 1950, the restricted section being approximately the same area that was removed in 1942. To avoid the restricted area of the testing range, the west end of SR 25 was realigned by 1957. The highway connected to US 6 at Warm Springs about 37 miles (60 km) east of the previous terminus, heading north around the Reveille Range instead of climbing the Kawich Range within the bombing area.

With the 1957 realignment, the routing of SR 25 attained its final form. The entire highway was paved by the following year. SR 25 remained unchanged until the 1976 renumbering of Nevada's state highways, through which the western section of SR 25 became the new State Route 375. The new route number was first seen on the 1978 edition of the official state highway map.

=== Naming the highway ===
Extraterrestrial Highway (State Route 375) sign

In 1989, an engineer named Bob Lazar claimed to have worked on alien spaceships and to have viewed saucer test flights in Tikaboo Valley, telling his story to a Las Vegas television station which was subsequently broadcast as an exclusive report. By the 1990s, stories of the top-secret U.S. government base at Area 51 had become mainstream, and many books and personal accounts had been published regarding extraterrestrial spacecraft and alien activity in the region surrounding Groom Lake. Rachel, being the closest settlement to the restricted facility, attracted people in search of UFOs and alien life. To capitalize on the purported paranormal activity along the route, the Nevada Commission on Tourism sought to rename the highway. State officials drew inspiration from the alien legends and dubbed SR 375 the Extraterrestrial Highway in February 1996. The tourism commission hoped that the renaming would "draw travelers to the austere and remote reaches of south-central Nevada, where old atomic bomb test sites, secret Defense Department airstrips and huge, sequestered tracts of military land create a marketable mystique".

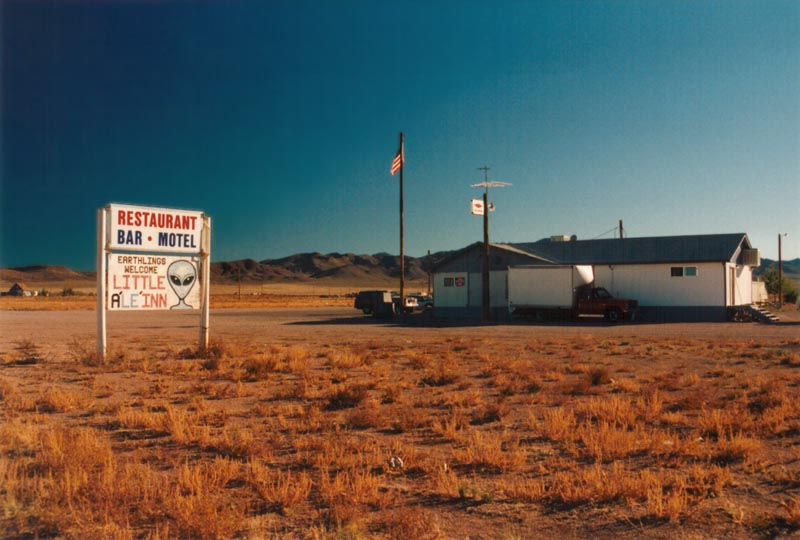
The Little A'Le'Inn in Rachel benefits from tourism brought by the renamed highway, October 1997

News of the highway's renaming reached Twentieth Century Fox. The studio used the opportunity to promote the release of the film Independence Day, whose plot involves an alien invasion of Earth and the secret facility at Area 51. A public dedication ceremony for the Extraterrestrial Highway was held in Rachel in April 1996. State dignitaries at the ceremony were joined by studio executives and Independence Day stars Jeff Goldblum, Robert Loggia, Bill Pullman, and Brent Spiner. Nevada Governor Bob Miller presided over the ceremony, speaking with humorous space references and unveiling special "Extraterrestrial Highway 375" and "Speed Limit Warp 7" signs for the highway. The event concluded with several guests placing items related to Nevada and the film into a time capsule commemorating the occasion.

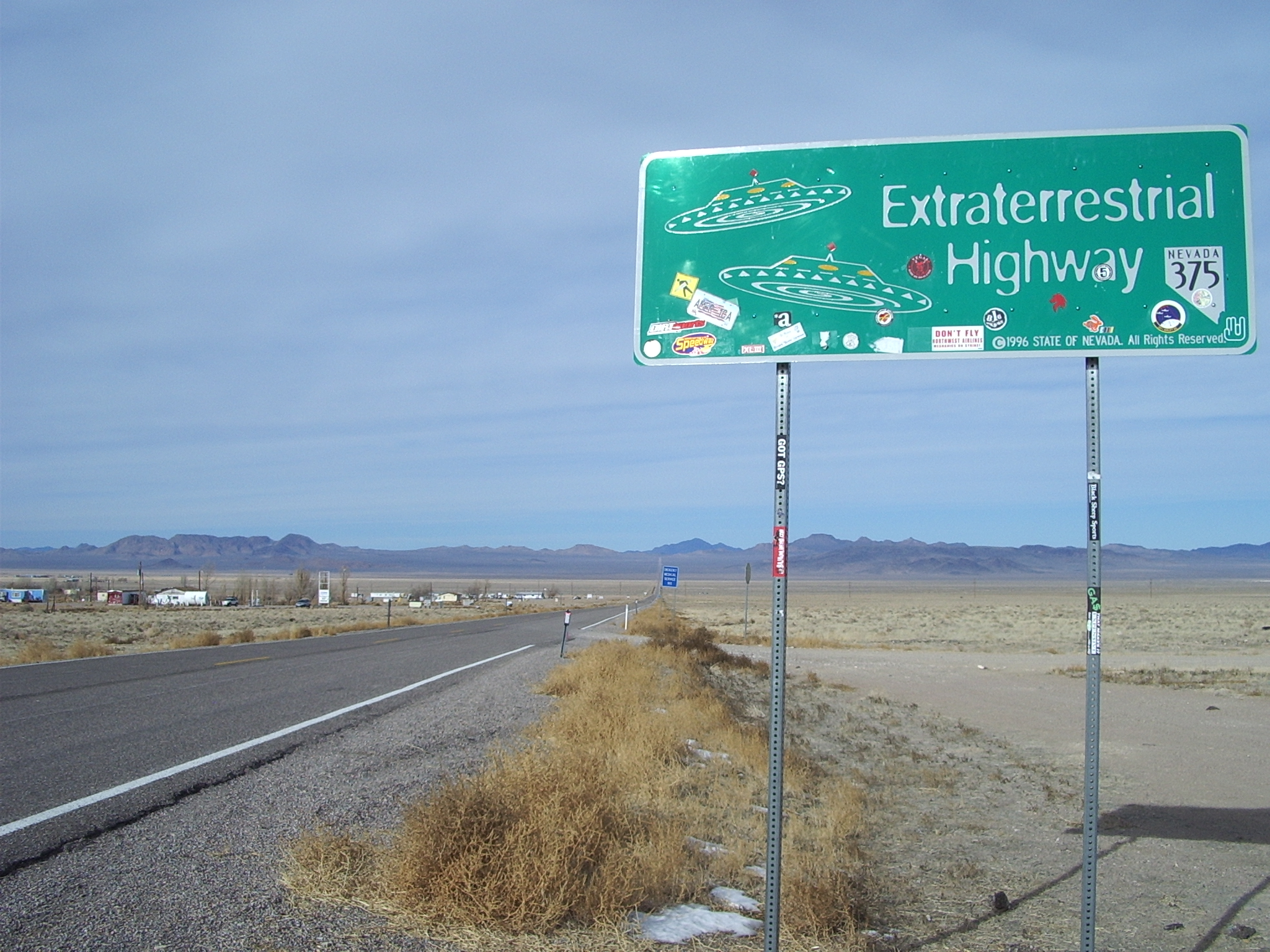
Looking northwest near Rachel, visitors have left their marks on the Extraterrestrial Highway, March 2004

To promote the Extraterrestrial Highway after its renaming, the tourism commission launched "The ET Experience" in July 1996. Tourists could contact the Nevada Commission on Tourism to receive a traveler's kit containing information about the highway, nearby cultural attractions, and area services. Visitors that patronized businesses in Rachel and central Nevada and submitted an account of their journey received Extraterrestrial Highway memorabilia. Stories from travelers were also published in a newsletter available to those that had completed the experience. Despite tourism generated by people searching for signs of alien life, only "an average of about 200 cars drive some portion of the Extraterrestrial Highway every day, making it one of the state’s least traveled routes."

In keeping with the supposed alien links of the area, in 2006, KFC established what was said to be the first corporate logo visible from space, made from 87,500 square feet (8,130 m^{2}) of tiles and sited just off the Extraterrestrial Highway in Rachel. The logo has since been removed.

== Major intersections ==
Note: Mileposts in Nevada reset at county lines. The start and end mileposts for each county are given in the county column.

County	Location	mi	km	Destinations	Notes
Lincoln; 0.00-49.102	Crystal Springs	0.000	0.000	SR 318 north – Hiko, Ely SR 318 south – to US 93 (Great Basin Highway), Alamo, Caliente, Las Vegas	Southern terminus
Nye; 0.00-49.341	Warm Springs	98.443	158.429	US 6 east – Ely, Delta (Utah) US 6 west – Tonopah, Bishop (California)	Northern terminus
1.000 mi = 1.609 km; 1.000 km = 0.621 mi

== See also ==
- List of state highways in Nevada
- State Route 319, the eastern segment of former State Route 25
