= Medlin =

Medlin is a surname of English (Cornwall) origin. Notable people with the surname include:

- Brian Herbert Medlin (1927–2004), Australian philosopher
- Dan Medlin (born 1949), American football player
- John Medlin (1933–2012), American businessman
- Lee Medlin (born 1964), American cyclist
- Lex Medlin (born 1969), American actor
- Lu Long Ogburn Medlin (1932–2025), American beauty queen
- Richard Medlin (born 1987), American football player
- Steve Medlin (born 1944), American rancher

== See also ==
- Medline (disambiguation)
