= Crystal Springs hot springs =

Thermal spring

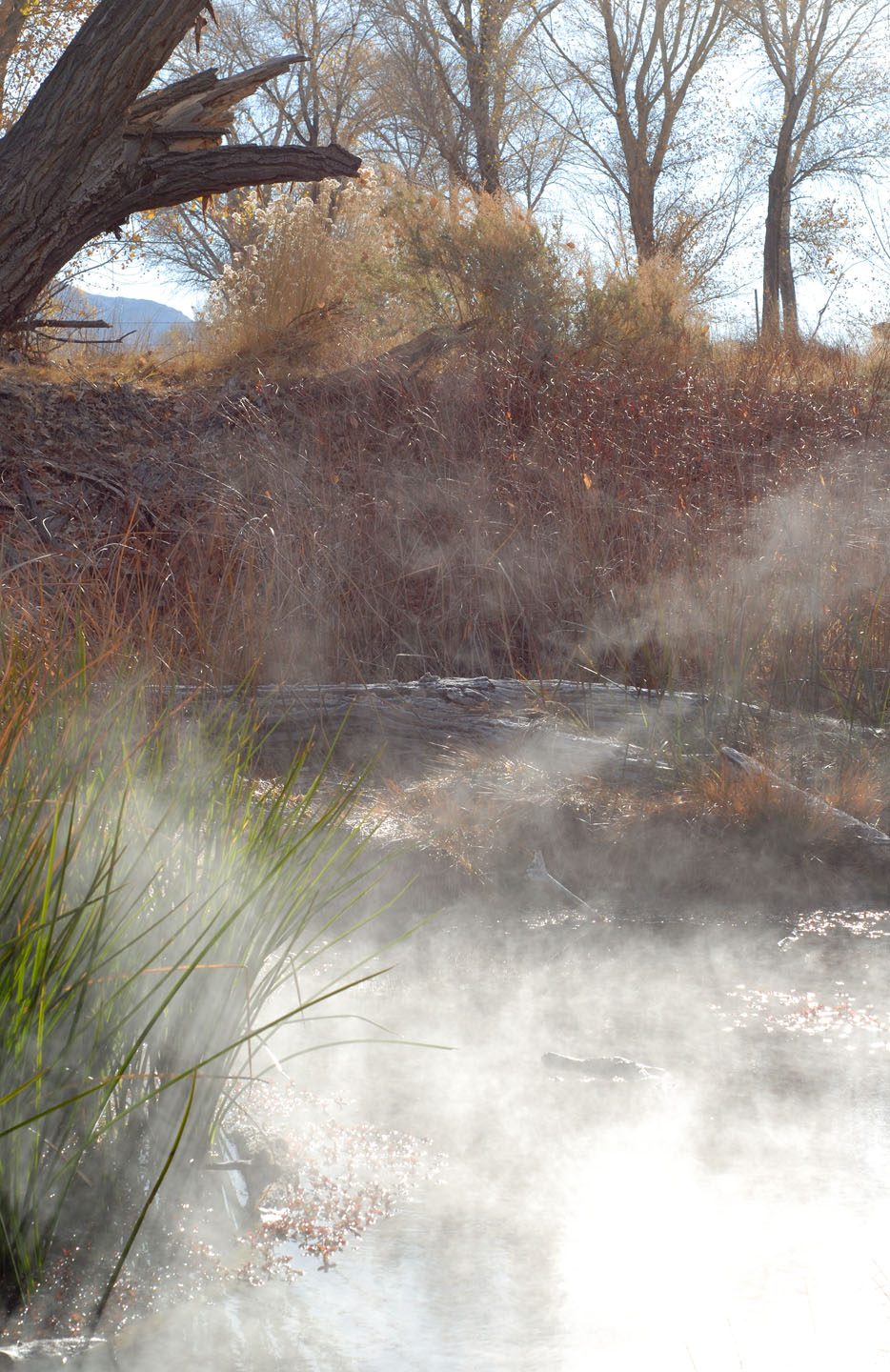
- Interactive map of Crystal Springs hot springs
- Location: Pahranagat Valley region of Lincoln County, Nevada
- Coordinates: 37°31′54″N 115°14′02″W
- Elevation: 4,000 ft (1,200 m)
- Discharge: 148 gallons per minute
- Temperature: 90 °F (32 °C)

Crystal Springs hot springs is a system of geothermal springs and seeps near Ash Springs, located at the site of a ghost town, Crystal Springs, Nevada. Several marshes and springs are located along the White River.

== Location ==
The spring area is located off the Extraterrestrial Highway in a remote area of the Nevada high desert near Nellis Air Force Base. There is a large soaking pool fed by the spring water. GPS coordinates are N 37 31.920 W 115 13.980 The nearly ghost town of Crystal Springs is located at the Nevada Historical Marker 205 (Crystal Springs), in the Pahranagat Valley region of Lincoln County, Nevada. Crystal Spring area was major site for stopovers on the alternate route of the Mormon trail, and later became a stagecoach stop and the first Lincoln County seat.

== Water profile ==
The hot mineral water emerges from the ground at 90°F/32°C. Water spraying from the irrigation pipe that is channeled into the soaking pool is 81°F. A rare species of freshwater snail lives in the warm spring water, the Crystal Spring Pyrgulopsis crystalis.

== See also ==
- List of hot springs in the United States
- List of hot springs in the world
