= Medline =

Medline may refer to:

- Publications of the United States National Library of Medicine
  - MEDLINE, a bibliographic database of life sciences and biomedical information
  - MedlinePlus, a consumer health information website
- Medline Inc., a hospital supply company
- Michael Medline (born 1963), Canadian business executive

== See also ==
- Medlin, surname
