= Nevada State Route 895 =

State highway in Nevada, United States

State Route 895
- Preston Spur
- SR 895 highlighted in red

Route information
- Maintained by NDOT
- Length: 1.481 mi (2.383 km)
- Existed: 1976–present

Major junctions
- South end: Preston
- North end: SR 318 near Preston

Location
- Country: United States
- State: Nevada
- Counties: White Pine

Highway system
- Nevada State Highway System; Interstate; US; State; Pre‑1976; Scenic
← SR 894	→ US 6

State Route 895 (SR 895) is a short state highway in White Pine County, Nevada. It is a spur route off of SR 318, serving the community of Preston near Lund. The route was designated in 1976, and has not changed significantly since. It is the highest numbered state highway in Nevada's state highway system.

== Route description ==
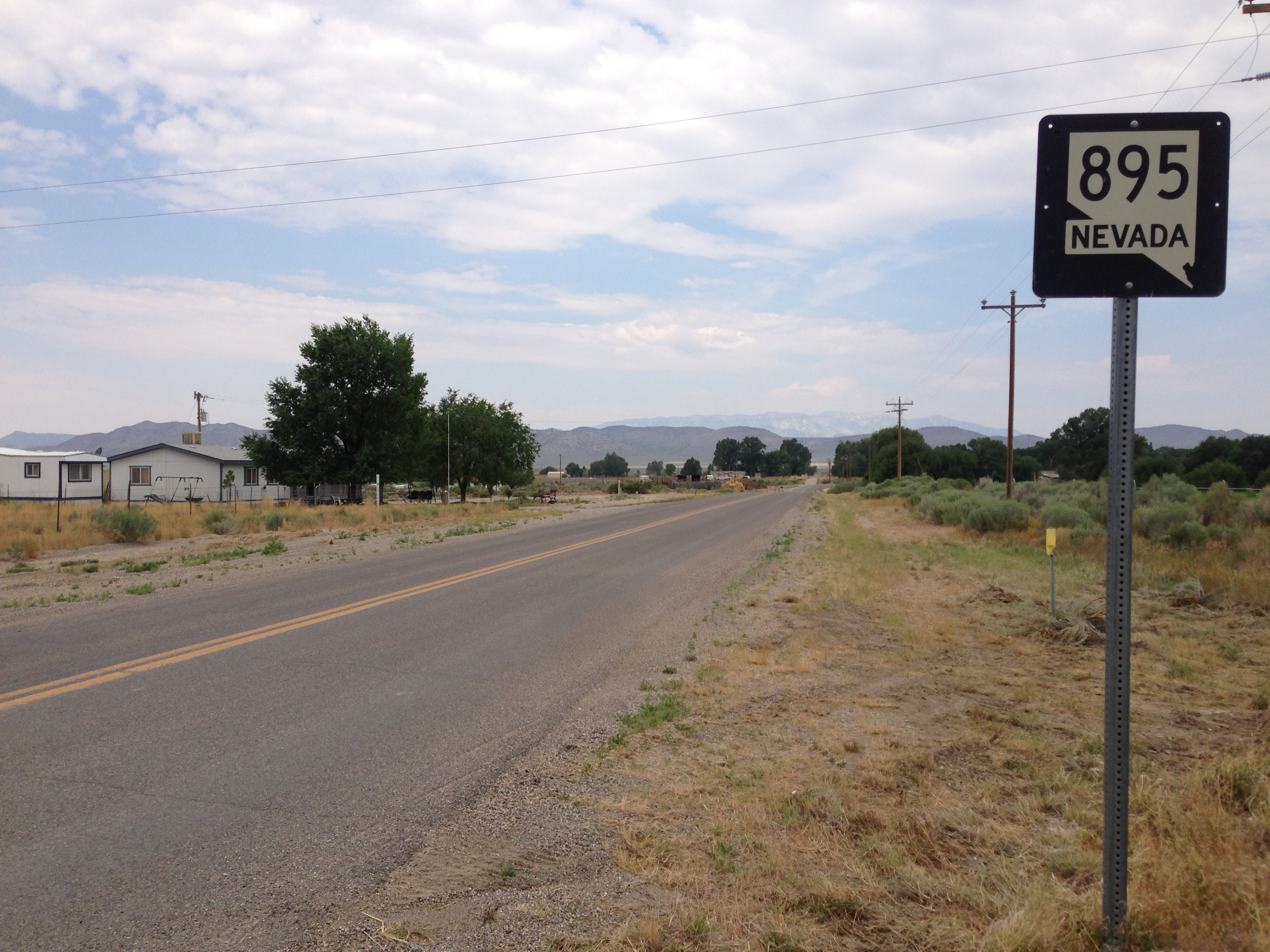
First reassurance sign along northbound SR 895

SR 895 starts at the eastern side of Preston, and turns northwestward. As the route leaves Preston, it turns northward. The road heads across the desert for about a mile, then ends at SR 318 at a T-intersection. SR 895 is not part of the National Highway System.

== History ==
The short route was designated in 1976, and has not changed significantly since.

== Major intersections ==
The entire route is in White Pine County.

Location	mi	km	Destinations	Notes
Preston	0.000	0.000	Southern terminus; continuation beyond terminus	
	1.481	2.383	SR 318 (Sunnyside Road)	Northern terminus
1.000 mi = 1.609 km; 1.000 km = 0.621 mi: Route transition
