= Alamo Landing Field =

- IATA: none; ICAO: none; FAA LID: L92

Summary
- Airport type: Public
- Owner: U.S. Bureau of Land Management
- Serves: Alamo, Nevada
- Elevation AMSL: 3,757 ft (1,145 m)
- Coordinates: 37°21′45″N 115°11′40″W
- Website: alamolandingfieldl92.com
- Interactive map of Alamo Landing Field

Runways
Direction	Length		Surface
Direction	ft	m	Surface
14/32	4,362	1,330	Asphalt

Statistics (2023)
- Aircraft operations (year ending 5/16/2023): 1,465
- Source: Federal Aviation Administration

Alamo Landing Field (FAA LID: L92) is a public-use airport located 2 nautical miles (3.7 km; 2.3 mi) west of the central business district of Alamo, in Lincoln County, Nevada, United States. The airport is owned by the U.S. Bureau of Land Management. It is the closest public-use airport to Groom Lake.

== History ==
This airport was abandoned prior to 1959 and resumed service around 1994. It was also known as Pahranagat Airport.

== Facilities and aircraft ==
Alamo Landing Field covers an area of 640 acres (260 ha) at an elevation of 3,757 ft (1,145 m) above mean sea level. It has one runway with asphalt surface: 14/32 is 4,362 by 60 ft (1,330 by 18 m) .

For the 12-month period ending May 16, 2023, the airport had 1,465 aircraft operations, an average of 28 per week: 24% military, 73% general aviation, and 3% air taxi.

== See also ==
- List of airports in Nevada
