= Warm Springs, Nevada =

Unincorporated community in Nevada, US

- Location within Nevada
- Coordinates: 38°11′26″N 116°22′12″W
- Country: United States
- State: Nevada
- County: Nye
- Elevation: 5,423 ft (1,653 m)
- Time zone: UTC-8 (Pacific)
  - Summer (DST): UTC-7 (PDT)
- ZIP code: 89049

Warm Springs is a former town in the Tonopah Basin in Nye County, Nevada, near the mountain pass which divides the Kawich and Hot Creek ranges (at 38.19°N 116.37°W). It is located at the junction of U.S. Route 6 and State Route 375 (the "Extraterrestrial Highway"), around 50 miles east of Tonopah. Only two abandoned buildings remain.

== History ==
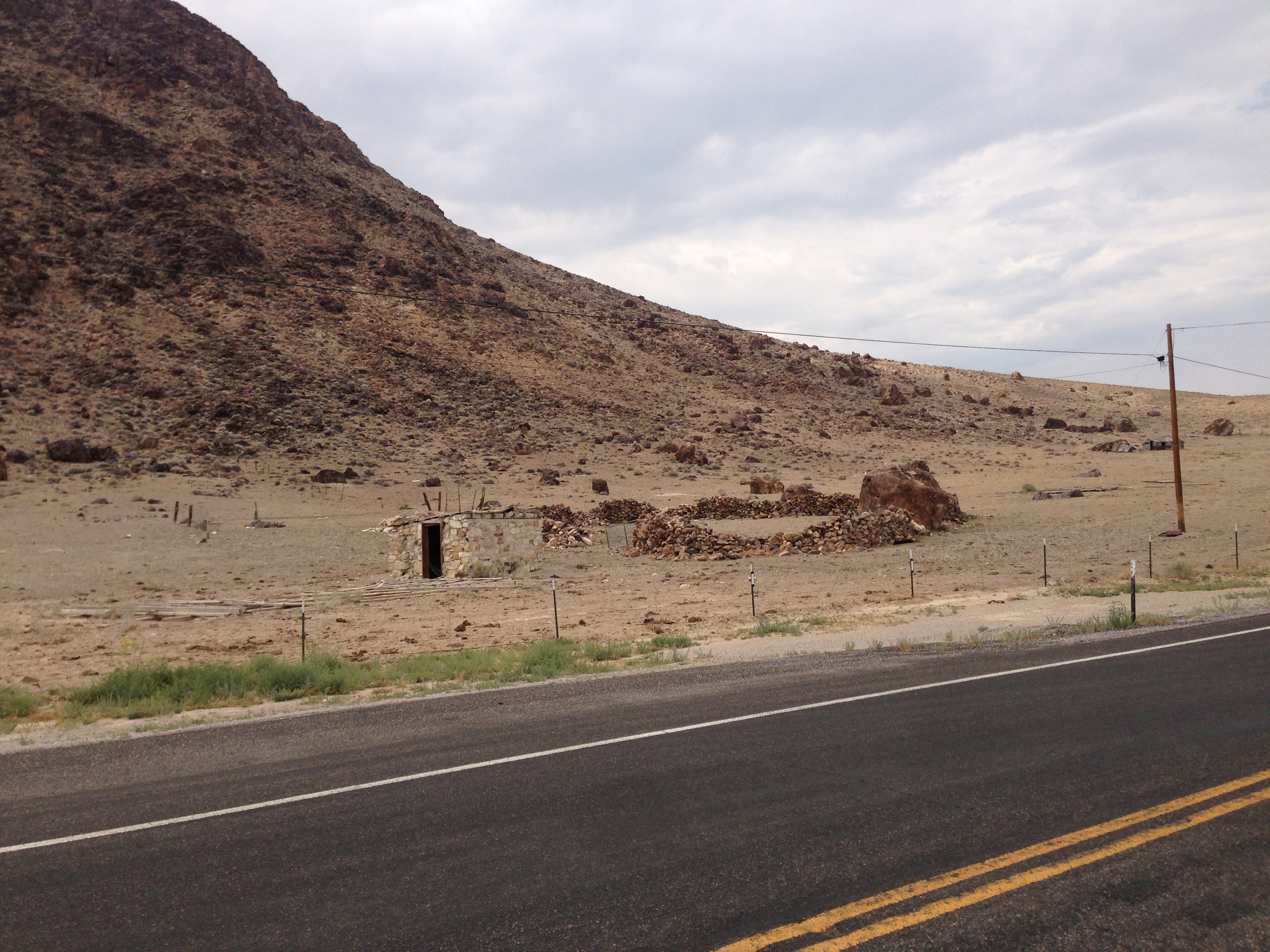
Abandoned ruins in Warm Springs

The first white settlement in Warm Springs was in 1866, when it served as a stopover for stagecoaches and other travellers. The post office was in operation from January 1924 through June 1929.

The population was 9 in 1940.

In 1947, the springs was purchased by the Fallini brothers and it was reported that Thomas Hurt had been operating the springs for several years. Never more than a tiny settlement, Warm Springs' population dwindled until it became a ghost town. All that remained was a single streetlight, a telephone box, and several huts built over pools filled by the warm springs that give the town its name.

== Climate ==
Climate data for Warm Springs, Nevada (Twin Springs) (1991-2020 normals, extremes 1985-2005)
Month	Jan	Feb	Mar	Apr	May	Jun	Jul	Aug	Sep	Oct	Nov	Dec	Year
Record high °F (°C)	65 (18)	73 (23)	83 (28)	87 (31)	98 (37)	99 (37)	109 (43)	102 (39)	95 (35)	90 (32)	76 (24)	66 (19)	109 (43)
Mean daily maximum °F (°C)	43.5 (6.4)	49.5 (9.7)	59.2 (15.1)	66.0 (18.9)	76.1 (24.5)	86.3 (30.2)	94.1 (34.5)	91.4 (33.0)	82.3 (27.9)	69.7 (20.9)	54.4 (12.4)	43.4 (6.3)	68.0 (20.0)
Daily mean °F (°C)	29.1 (−1.6)	35.9 (2.2)	43.3 (6.3)	49.7 (9.8)	58.5 (14.7)	67.6 (19.8)	74.5 (23.6)	71.9 (22.2)	62.3 (16.8)	50.7 (10.4)	37.3 (2.9)	28.6 (−1.9)	50.8 (10.4)
Mean daily minimum °F (°C)	14.7 (−9.6)	22.3 (−5.4)	27.4 (−2.6)	33.4 (0.8)	40.9 (4.9)	48.9 (9.4)	54.9 (12.7)	52.4 (11.3)	42.2 (5.7)	31.7 (−0.2)	20.2 (−6.6)	13.8 (−10.1)	33.6 (0.9)
Record low °F (°C)	−31 (−35)	−32 (−36)	7 (−14)	9 (−13)	18 (−8)	29 (−2)	35 (2)	30 (−1)	22 (−6)	8 (−13)	−13 (−25)	−26 (−32)	−32 (−36)
Average precipitation inches (mm)	0.41 (10)	0.44 (11)	0.41 (10)	0.57 (14)	0.61 (15)	0.20 (5.1)	0.54 (14)	0.41 (10)	0.35 (8.9)	0.34 (8.6)	0.39 (9.9)	0.26 (6.6)	4.93 (123.1)
Average snowfall inches (cm)	0.9 (2.3)	0.1 (0.25)	0.0 (0.0)	0.0 (0.0)	0.0 (0.0)	0.0 (0.0)	0.0 (0.0)	0.0 (0.0)	0.0 (0.0)	0.0 (0.0)	0.6 (1.5)	0.0 (0.0)	1.6 (4.05)
Average precipitation days (≥ 0.01 in)	3.3	4.9	4.0	4.2	4.0	2.1	2.5	2.8	2.5	2.4	2.2	2.7	37.6
Average snowy days (≥ 0.1 in)	0.2	0.4	0.0	0.0	0.0	0.0	0.0	0.0	0.0	0.0	0.1	0.2	0.9
Source: NOAA (snowfall 1985-2005)
