= Preston, Nevada =

Census-designated place in White Pine County, Nevada United States

- Census-designated place
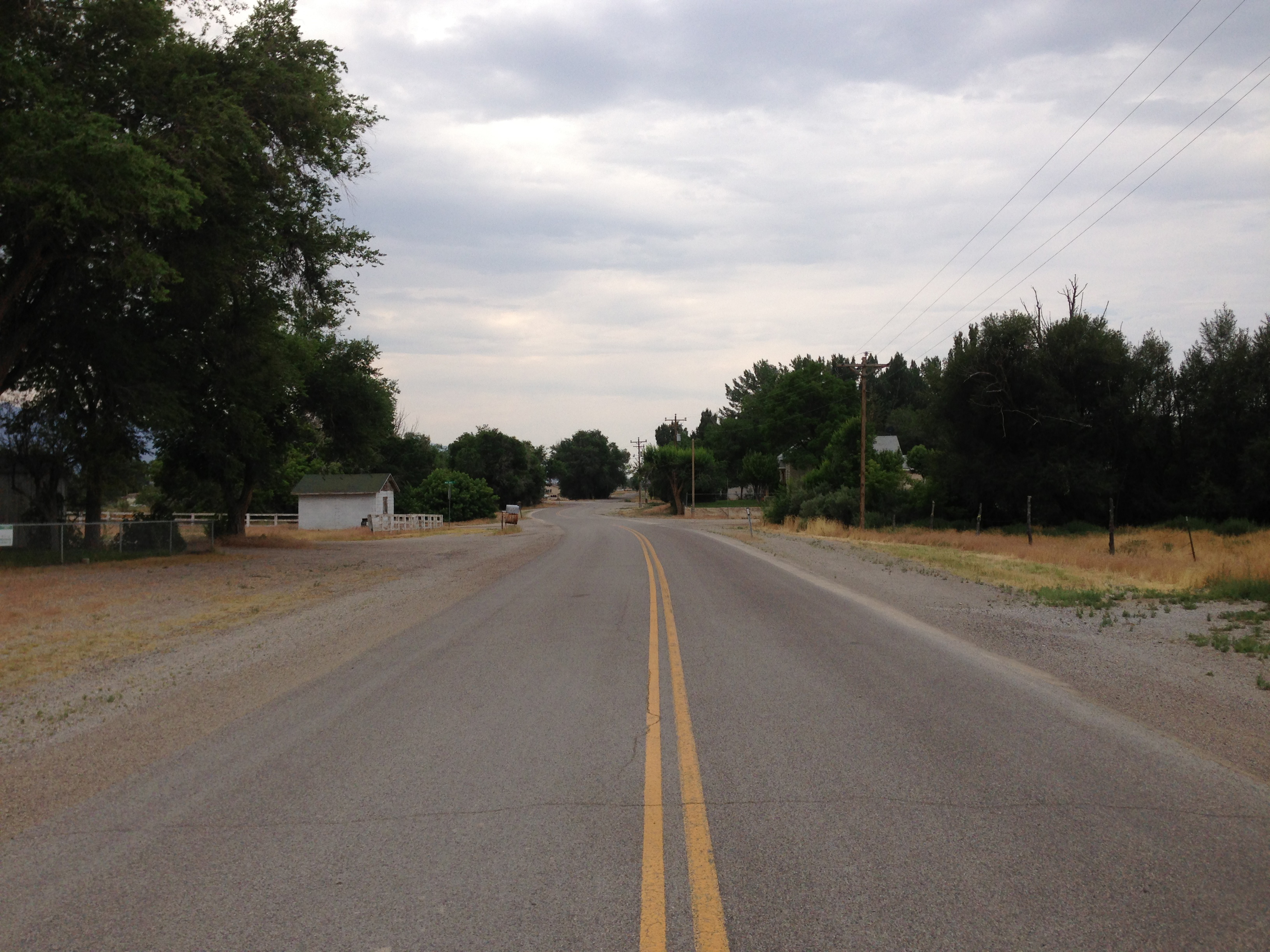
- Nevada State Route 895 in Preston, July 2014

- Location within the state of Nevada Location within the United States
- Coordinates: 38°54′54″N 115°03′49″W
- Country: United States
- State: Nevada
- County: White Pine
- Established: 1876

Area
  - Total: 1.29 sq mi (3.35 km^{2})
  - Land: 1.29 sq mi (3.35 km^{2})
  - Water: 0 sq mi (0.00 km^{2})
- Elevation: 5,643 ft (1,720 m)

Population (2020)
  - Total: 76
  - Density: 58.8/sq mi (22.71/km^{2})
- Time zone: UTC-8 (Pacific (PST))
  - Summer (DST): UTC-7 (PDT)
- ZIP code: 89317
- Area code: 775
- FIPS code: 32-58000
- GNIS feature ID: 2583952

Preston is a census-designated place in White Pine County, Nevada, United States. As of the 2020 census, Preston had a population of 76.

== Description ==
Preston was established by Mormon settlers in 1898, and named after William B. Preston, the fourth Presiding Bishop of the Church of Jesus Christ of Latter-day Saints between 1884 and 1907. The community's economy is based on agriculture and ranching. In the 2010 census Preston had a population of 78.

== Demographics ==
Historical population
| Census | Pop. | Note | %± |
|---|---|---|---|
| 2010 | 78 | | — |
| 2020 | 76 | | −2.6% |
U.S. Decennial Census

== See also ==
- List of census-designated places in Nevada
