= Rachel, Nevada =

- Census-designated place
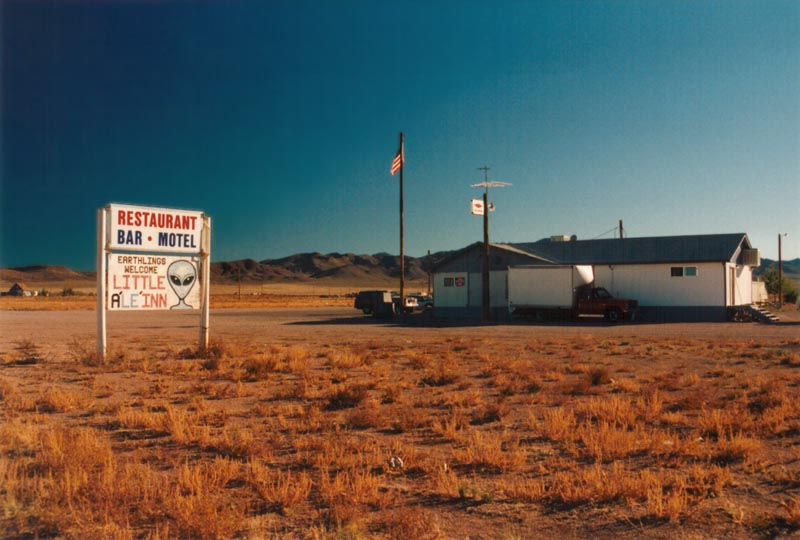
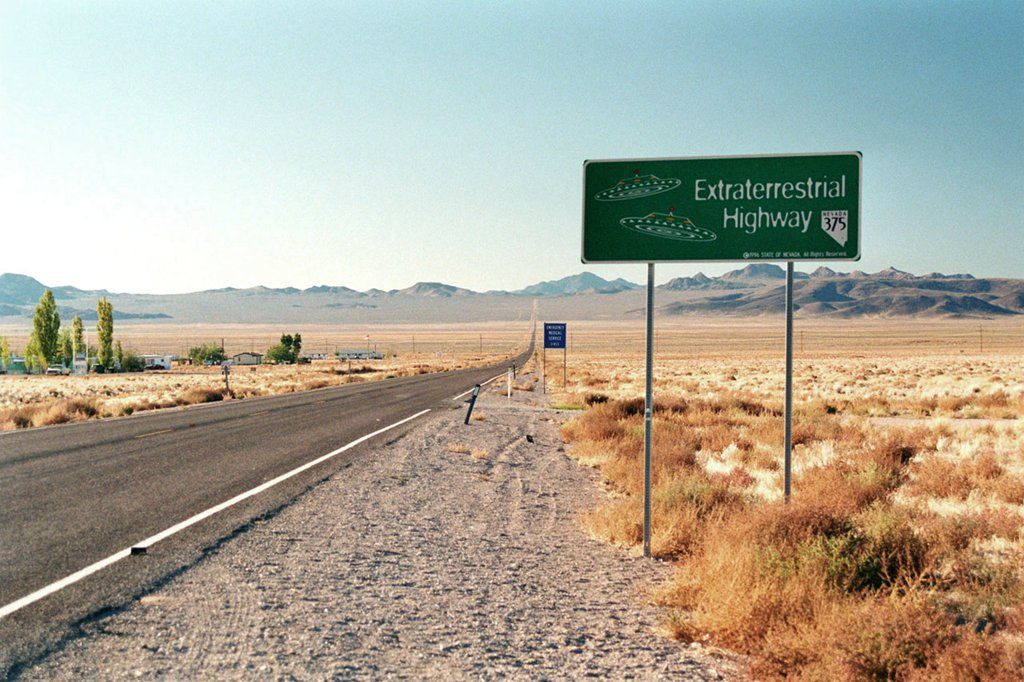
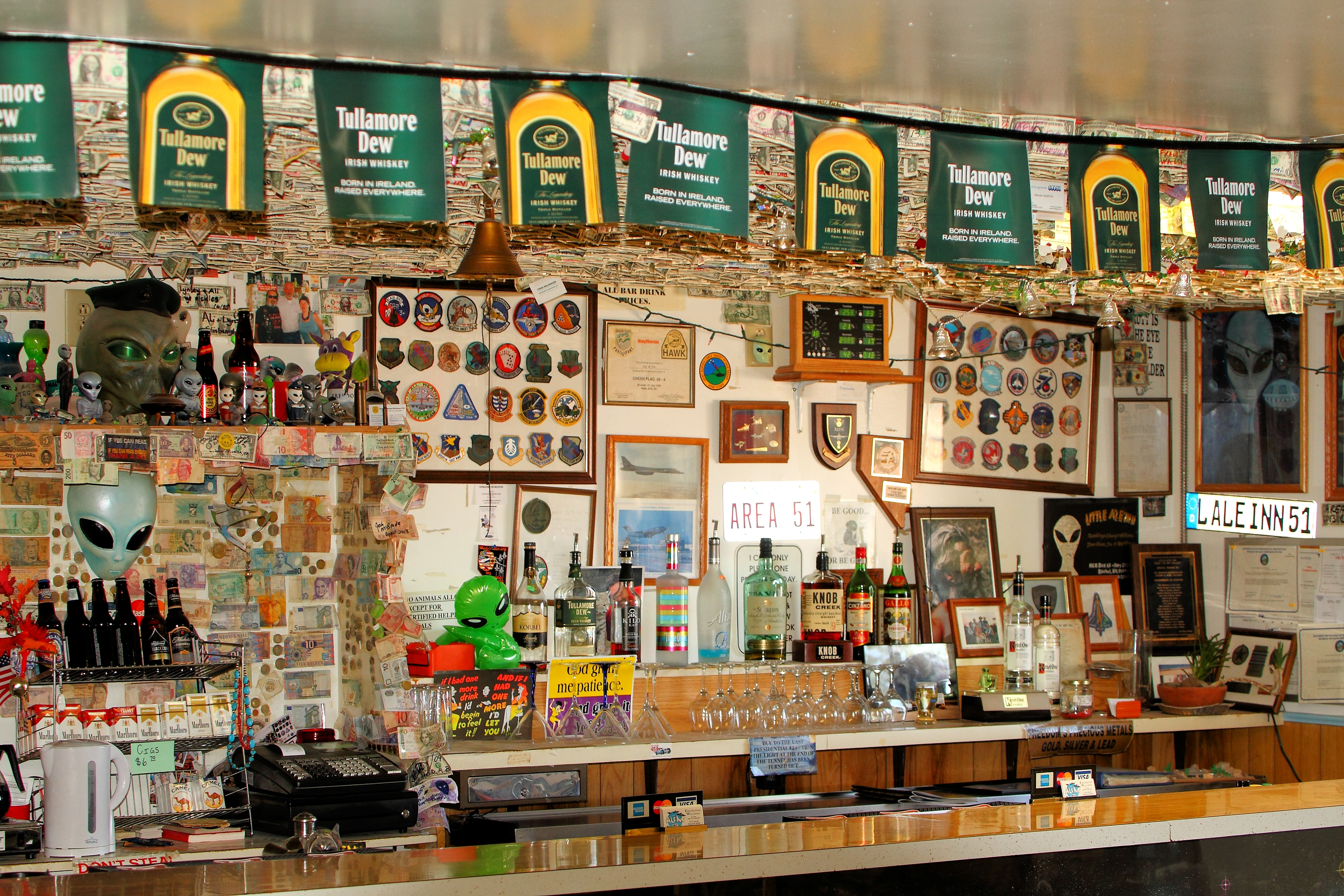
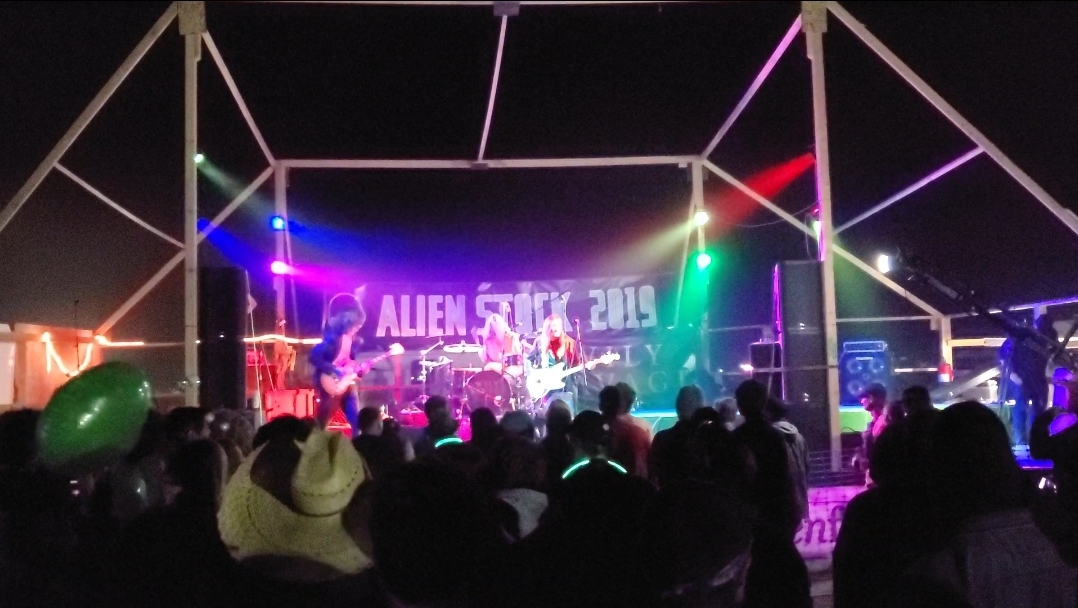
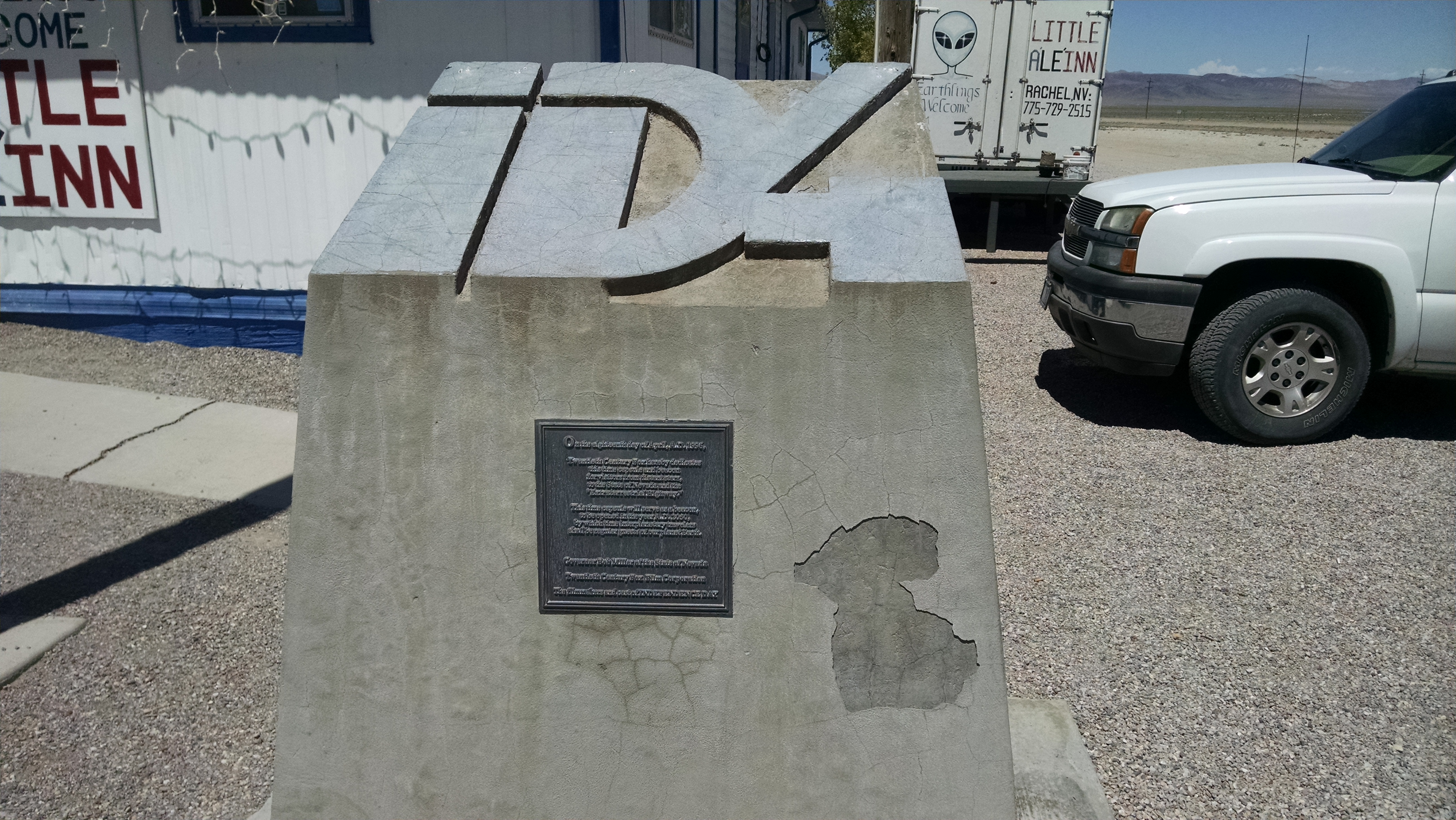
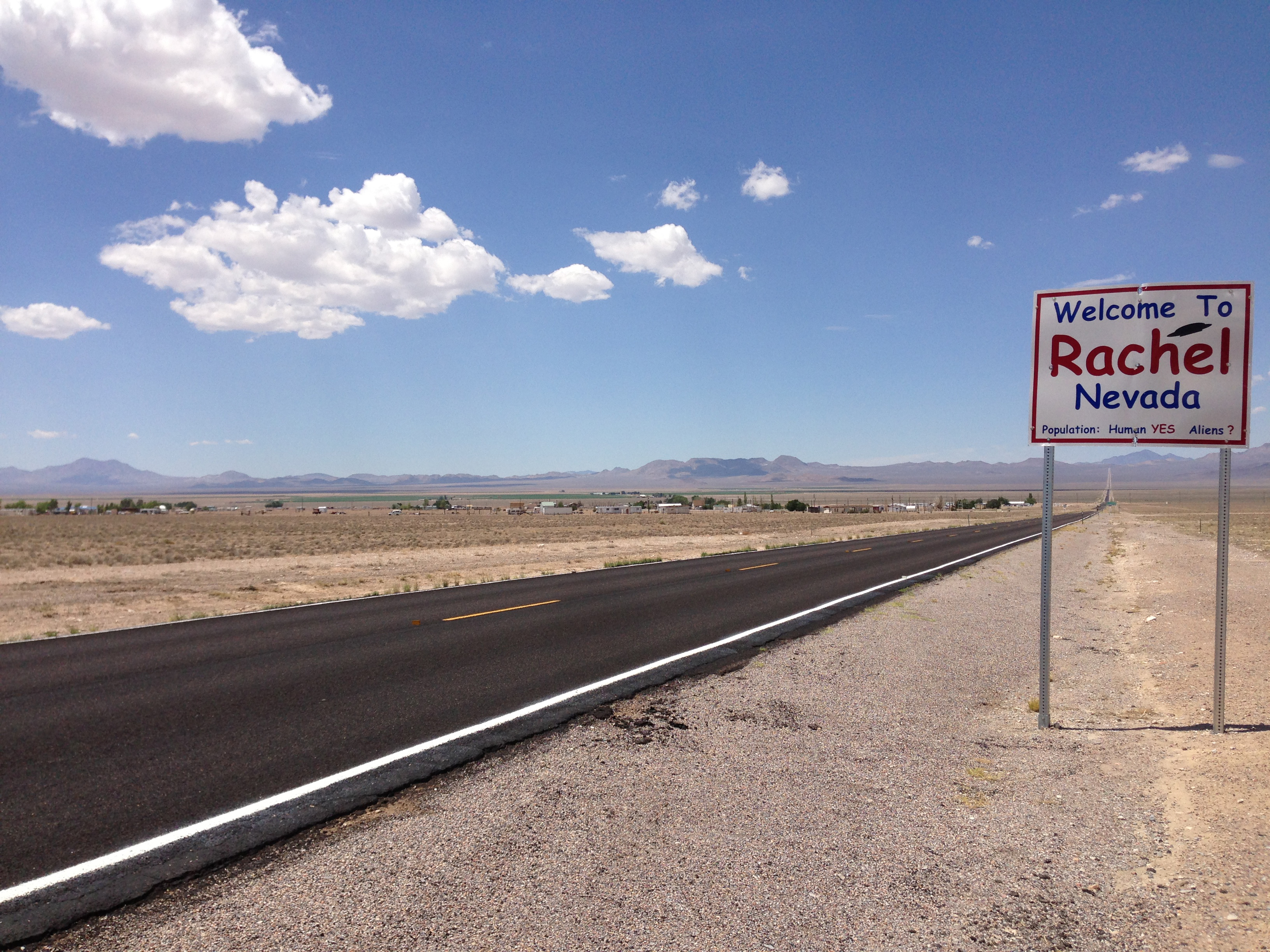
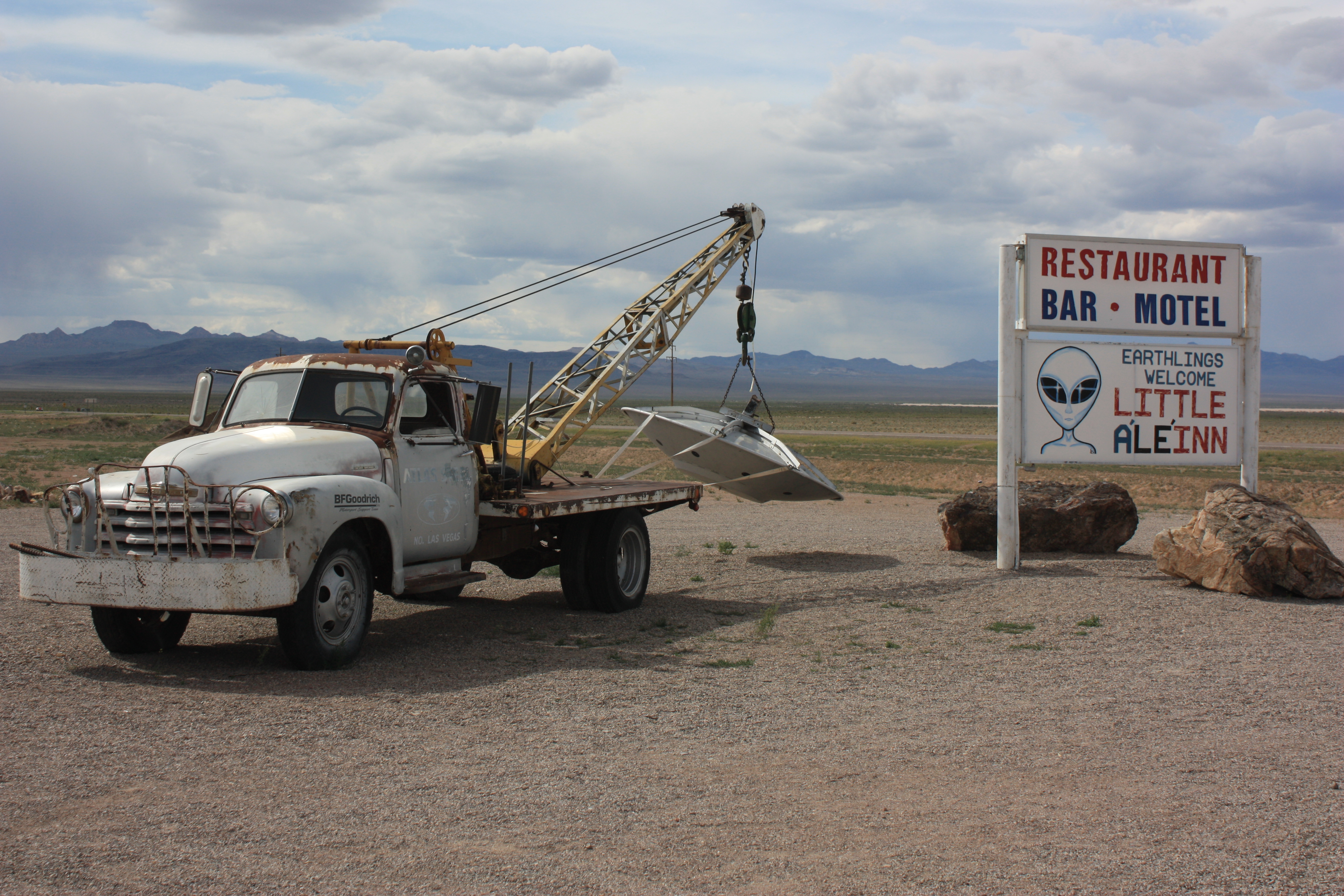
- Clockwise from top: The Little A'Le'Inn; Inside the Little A'Le'Inn in May 2014; Independence Day 4 time capsule installed by the production team outside the A'Le'Inn; A tow truck towing a crashed UFO, a local art installation; Sign for and view of Rachel, Nevada northbound on the Extraterrestrial Highway; The Alienstock music festival hosted to celebrate the storming of Area 51; Rachel, as seen from Highway 375, looking northwest

- Location within Nevada Location within the United States
- Coordinates: 37°38′21″N 115°45′15″W
- Country: United States
- State: Nevada
- County: Lincoln
- Established: 1996-07-04
- Named for: Rachel Jones

Area
  - Total: 4.34 sq mi (11.24 km^{2})
  - Land: 4.34 sq mi (11.24 km^{2})
  - Water: 0 sq mi (0.00 km^{2})
- Elevation: 4,794 ft (1,461 m)

Population (2020)
  - Total: 48
  - Density: 11.1/sq mi (4.27/km^{2})
- Time zone: UTC-08:00 (PST)
  - Summer (DST): UTC-07:00 (PDT)
- ZIP Code: 89001
- Area code: 775
- FIPS code: 32-58820
- GNIS feature ID: 2583953
- Website: www.rachel-nevada.com

Rachel is a census-designated place (CDP) in Lincoln County, Nevada, United States. As of the 2020 census, it had a population of 48. As the closest settlement to the Nellis Air Force Range and Area 51, Rachel enjoys a modest celebrity status, particularly among aviation enthusiasts and UFO hunters.

== Overview ==
Rachel is over 100 miles (160 km) north of Las Vegas in the Great Basin Desert, along Nevada Highway 375 (the "Extraterrestrial Highway") in Nevada. The tiny town receives a substantial number of visitors and tourists, catered to by a small tourist shop, a 12-room motel, and an alien-themed restaurant and bar, the Little A'Le'Inn.

Several unpaved roads near Rachel lead from Highway 375 to the boundary of Area 51.

Rachel's resident population generally numbers around 50, with some of them involved in ranching. Most of the year-round inhabitants live in mobile homes. Rachel has never had a post office. The children are bussed to Alamo, approximately 50 miles (80 km) away, for school. North of the town is the Quinn Canyon Range that has the ghost town of Adaven.

== History ==
=== Early years ===
Rachel was founded in May 1973 by a local alfalfa farmer named D.C. Day. The community was first known as Tempiute Village, and then later as Sand Springs.

On February 15, 1978, the town was renamed to Rachel after the first baby born in the valley, Rachel Jones (1978–1980). Rachel Jones died on May 24, 1980. In memory of her, Rachel residents created a cemetery and memorial park. Rachel Jones was not buried at Rachel Cemetery.

Electricity arrived in Rachel on March 22, 1978, supplied to the Penoyer Valley by the Penoyer Valley Electric Cooperative.

In 1980, the Rachel Baptist Mission, Rachel's only church, began service in a donated mobile home. Since then, a part-time pastor has come to Rachel for religious services every Sunday morning.

=== Mid-air collision ===
On July 10, 1986, at about 4:10 pm, two F-16s of the Norwegian Air Force collided in mid-air while participating in Red Flag exercises near Rachel. One of them crashed within Rachel, only 25 yards (23 m) from the edge of a mobile home park. The pilot of the downed fighter had ejected safely before the crash, and the other F-16 made it back to Nellis Air Force Base. The pilot of the downed F-16 suffered only minor injuries, and was transported from the crash site within 20 minutes of the incident by a U.S. Air Force helicopter.

=== Events ===
In 1995, the Rachel Baptist Mission moved into a permanent building at the same site that it had occupied previously.

In 2006, KFC created a giant company logo on the ground at the north edge of Rachel and claimed it to be the first logo visible from space. Constructed in early November, it took six days to assemble the 65,000 colored tiles on 87,500 square feet (8,130 m^{2}) of flat desert terrain. The logo also had a hidden message on the tie area of the logo that featured an impostor colonel holding a sign over his head, reading "Finger Lickin' Good". The logo was removed in mid-2007.

== Demographics ==
Historical population
Census	Pop.	Note	%±
2010	54		—
2020	48		−11.1%
U.S. Decennial Census

As of the census of 2010, there were 54 people, 32 households, and 14 families residing in the CDP. The racial makeup was 94.44% White, 3.70% Asian, and 1.85% from other races. 11.11% were Hispanic or Latino of any race.

Of the 32 households, 6.25% had children under the age of 18, 25.00% were married couples, 6.25% had a male householder with no wife present, and 12.50% had a female householder with no husband present. 56.25% of households were made up of individuals, and 9.38% had someone living alone who was 65 years of age or older. The average household size was 1.69 and the average family size was 2.50.

In the CDP, the population was spread out, with 16.67% ages 15 to 24, 59.26% ages 35 to 64, and 24.07% aged 65 and over. The median age was 52.5 years. 59.26% of the residents were male, and 40.74% were female.

== Climate ==
Rachel has a cold desert climate (Köppen climate classification BWk), with cold winters, warm summers and a high diurnal temperature variation. The average annual high temperature is 68.5 °F (20.3 °C), while the average annual low temperature is 32.5 °F (0.3 °C). July has the highest average high at 91.8 °F (33.2 °C) and the highest average low at 53.8 °F (12.1 °C). January has the lowest average high at 46.0 °F (7.8 °C). December has the lowest average low at 14.2 °F (−9.9 °C). The highest temperature ever recorded was 104 °F (40 °C) in July and the lowest temperature ever recorded was −20 °F (−29 °C) in January.

Rachel receives 5.5 inches (139 mm) of precipitation, with the climate being consistently dry like the rest of the Great Basin. July, the wettest month, receives 0.83 inches (21 mm) of rainfall on average. September, the driest month, receives 0.29 inches (7.4 mm) of rainfall on average. Rachel receives a few inches of snowfall every winter.

Climate data for Rachel, Nevada (elevation 4,840ft)
Month	Jan	Feb	Mar	Apr	May	Jun	Jul	Aug	Sep	Oct	Nov	Dec	Year
Record high °F (°C)	67 (19)	71 (22)	79 (26)	84 (29)	94 (34)	103 (39)	104 (40)	100 (38)	97 (36)	88 (31)	76 (24)	66 (19)	104 (40)
Mean daily maximum °F (°C)	46.0 (7.8)	52.2 (11.2)	59.6 (15.3)	65.3 (18.5)	76.6 (24.8)	84.9 (29.4)	91.7 (33.2)	89.7 (32.1)	82.8 (28.2)	70.6 (21.4)	56.8 (13.8)	46.7 (8.2)	68.6 (20.3)
Mean daily minimum °F (°C)	14.4 (−9.8)	20.1 (−6.6)	25.3 (−3.7)	31.2 (−0.4)	39.9 (4.4)	47.4 (8.6)	53.7 (12.1)	51.4 (10.8)	41.6 (5.3)	30.6 (−0.8)	21.3 (−5.9)	14.2 (−9.9)	32.6 (0.3)
Record low °F (°C)	−21 (−29)	−17 (−27)	7 (−14)	11 (−12)	20 (−7)	27 (−3)	36 (2)	35 (2)	24 (−4)	11 (−12)	−1 (−18)	−18 (−28)	−21 (−29)
Average precipitation inches (mm)	0.33 (8.4)	0.76 (19)	0.40 (10)	0.51 (13)	0.31 (7.9)	0.35 (8.9)	0.81 (21)	0.46 (12)	0.29 (7.4)	0.43 (11)	0.47 (12)	0.36 (9.1)	5.47 (139)
Average snowfall inches (cm)	2.4 (6.1)	1.2 (3.0)	1.0 (2.5)	0.5 (1.3)	0.0 (0.0)	0.0 (0.0)	0.0 (0.0)	0.0 (0.0)	0.0 (0.0)	0.2 (0.51)	0.2 (0.51)	0.8 (2.0)	6.3 (16)
Source: The Western Regional Climate Center

== Economy ==
While a local tungsten mine was operative, the community numbered over 500 inhabitants, but after the mine's closing in 1988, the population rapidly dwindled.

The Area 51 Research Center, a small UFO souvenir shop, closed in November 2001. It subsequently re-opened in a corner of the Little A'Le'Inn, previously the Rachel Bar and Grill. It is a small bar, restaurant and motel located in Rachel, along the Extraterrestrial Highway. The business has been running for over 20 years and is frequented by visitors to the local Area 51. The inn opened circa 1989. The original owners were Joe (now deceased) and Pat Travis.

== In popular culture ==
Rachel was featured in an episode of Louis Theroux's Weird Weekends which covered the UFO subculture. Rachel was mentioned in a two-part episode of The X-Files entitled "Dreamland", in which a secret agent aware of the hidden backstory of the show, played by Michael McKean, resided in the town and in which it is portrayed as much larger, and more suburban than it is in reality. It is also a key place in the first-person shooter game BlackSite: Area 51.

In 1996, the producers of the movie Independence Day gave the town a time capsule, which is installed near the inn and is intended to be opened in 2050.

Beginning September 19, 2019, the day before the Area 51 Raid, people were reported showing up and camping around Rachel in preparation for the raid.

In Grand Theft Auto: San Andreas, the Little A'Le'Inn is referenced. It can be found in Bone County, San Andreas in the vicinity of Area 69, the game's parallel to Area 51, using the name "Lil' Probe'Inn".

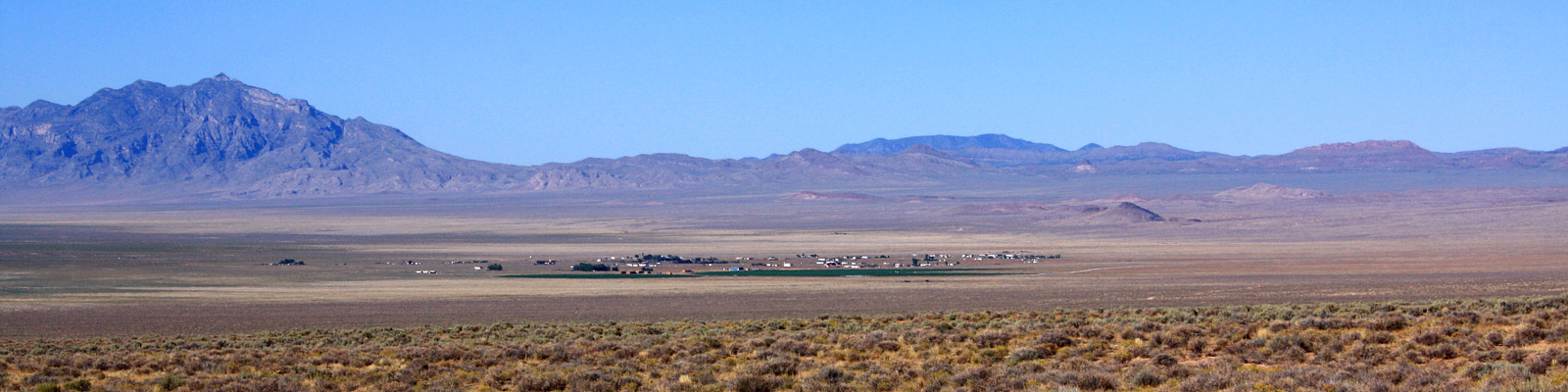
Panoramic view of Rachel and the surrounding area from the northern boundary of Area 51.
