= Steve Medlin =

American rancher

- Born: Steven Lee Medlin; April 10, 1944
- Occupation: Rancher
- Known for: Owning and operating the Medlin Ranch bordering Area 51

Steven Lee Medlin (born April 10, 1944) is an American rancher who garnered media attention due to his ranch's location on the border of the highly classified United States Air Force (USAF) facility, Area 51.

Steve and his wife Glenda Wilson Medlin (January 18, 1947 - August 30, 2021) purchased the ranch in 1973, eventually building a 500 head cattle operation. In 2021, shortly before Glenda's death, the Medlins sold the ranch.

== The Black Mailbox ==
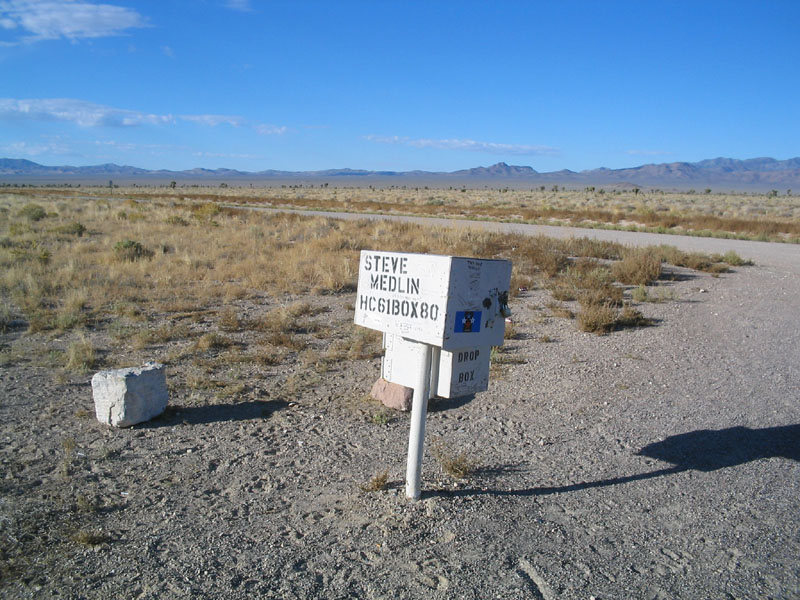
The 'Black' Mailbox

Medlin's mailbox, located on the corner of Nevada State Route 375 and Mail Box Rd became infamous amongst UFO enthusiasts and tourists due to people presuming it was the mailbox for the base itself. The 'Black Mailbox' continued to be covered in graffiti and stickers for years, and was eventually painted white by Medlin, and adorned with his name. The mailbox was also later removed.
