= Hiko, Nevada =

Unincorporated community in Nevada, US

- Census-designated place
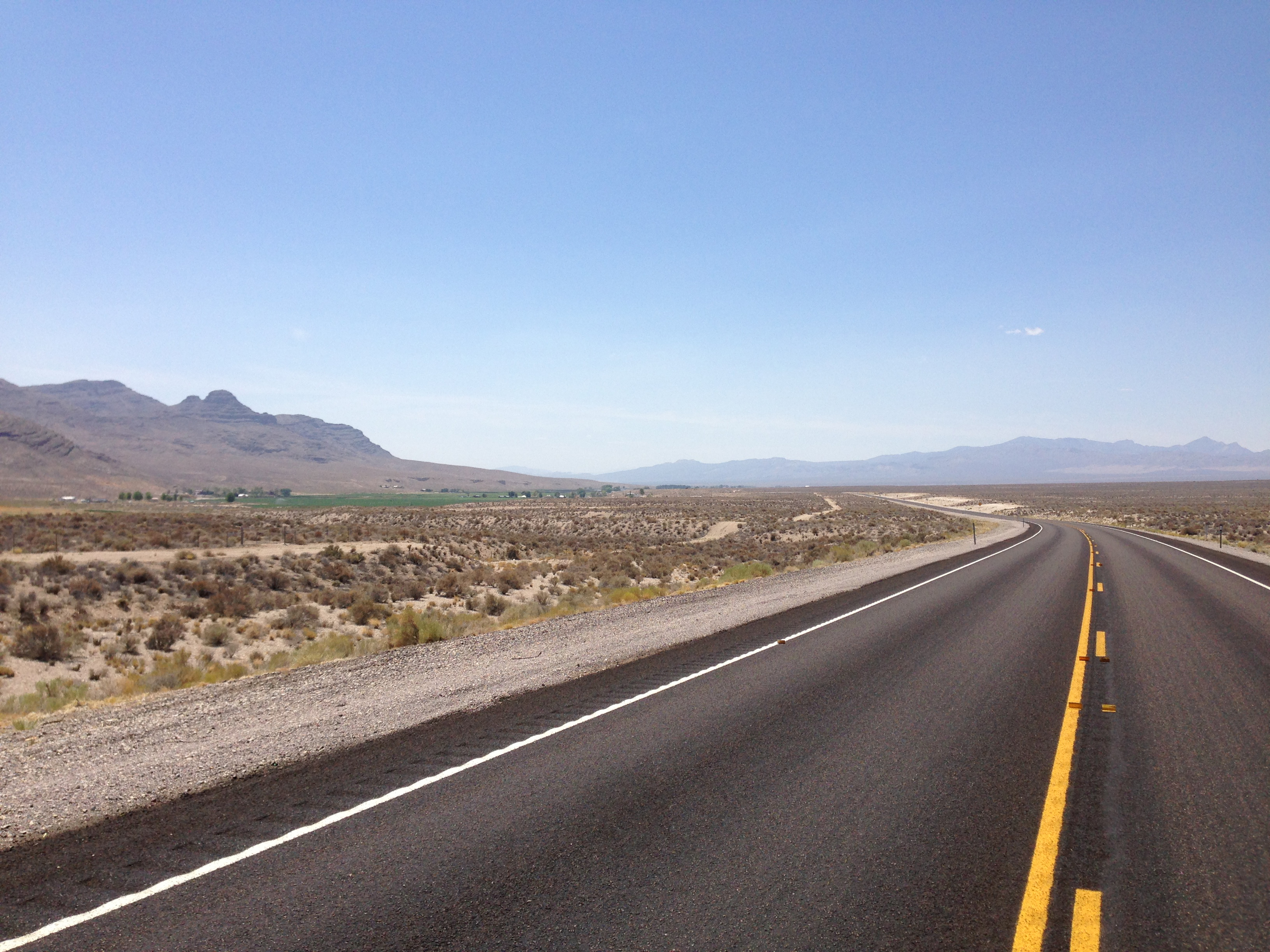
- Entering Hiko, Nevada from the north on SR 318

- Location within the state of Nevada
- Coordinates: 37°38′20″N 115°11′42″W
- Country: United States
- State: Nevada
- County: Lincoln

Area
  - Total: 23.74 sq mi (61.49 km^{2})
  - Land: 23.41 sq mi (60.64 km^{2})
  - Water: 0.33 sq mi (0.85 km^{2})
- Elevation: 4,315 ft (1,315 m)

Population (2020)
  - Total: 124
  - Density: 5.3/sq mi (2.04/km^{2})
- Time zone: UTC-8 (Pacific (PST))
  - Summer (DST): UTC-7 (PDT)
- ZIP code: 89017
- FIPS code: 32-32900
- GNIS feature ID: 2583932

Nevada Historical Marker
- Reference no.: 206

Hiko is a small, agrarian community in the Tonopah Basin on State Route 318 in Lincoln County, Nevada, United States. It is a census-designated place. As of the 2020 census, Hiko had a population of 124.

== Description ==
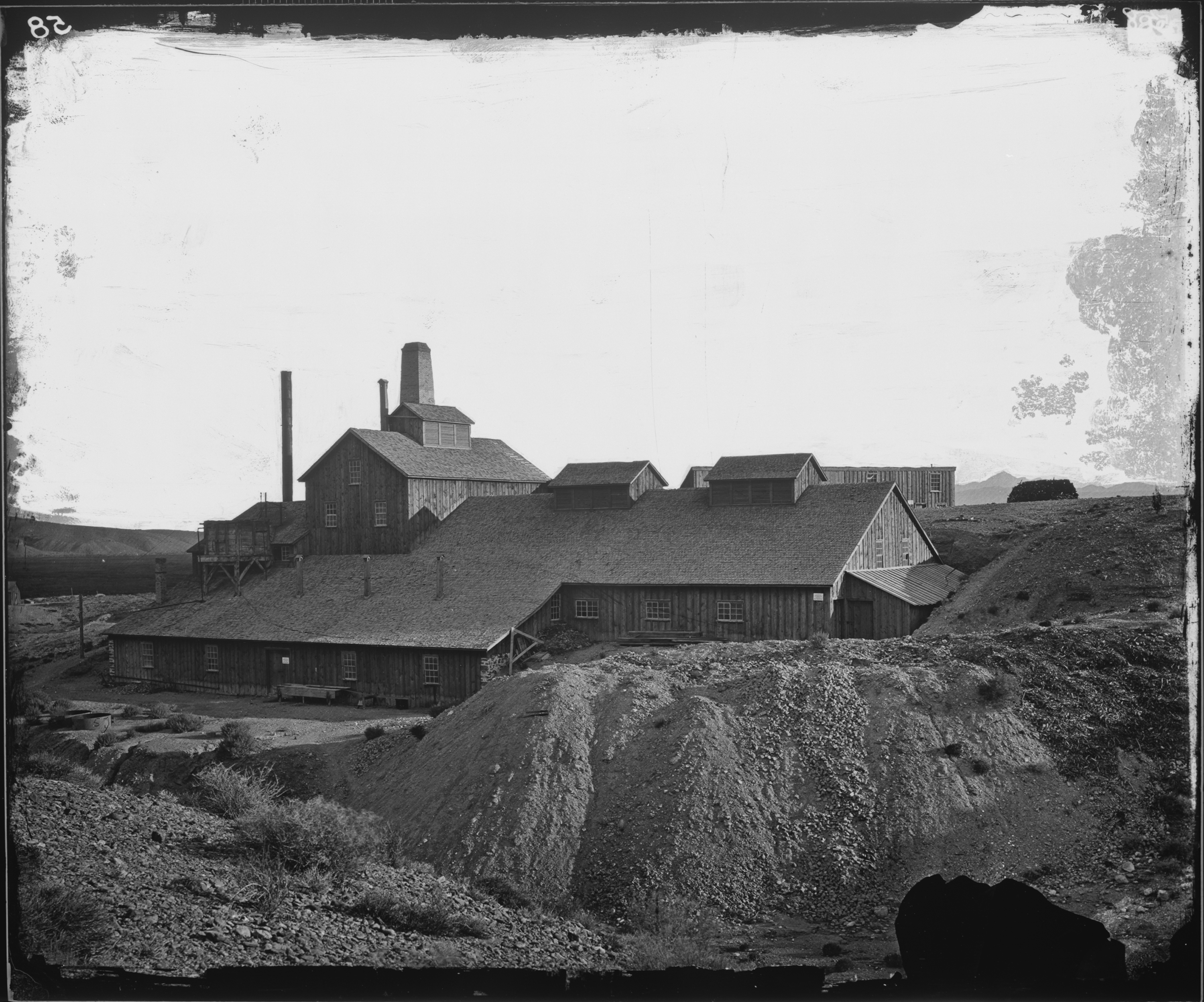
Mill of Hyko Silver Mining Co. in 1871

The first permanent settlement at Hiko was made in 1853. Hiko was the county seat of Lincoln County from 1867 to 1871 and a few hundred residents lived nearby, due largely to silver mines in the area. Today, the area is a farming and ranching area, and not much remains of the old town except the cemetery, some mill ruins and a red rock building that was a general store. Although populated, Hiko appears on at least two ghost town lists. Most of the residents of Hiko own farms or ranches, and little to no industrial activity takes place there. In 1871 Hiko was replaced as the county seat of Lincoln County with the current seat, Pioche.

The Hiko and Crystal Springs provide a large supply of water for the Hiko farms and ranches. The Hiko farming community is located in the north end of the Pahranagat Valley and lies at an elevation of 3,869 feet (1,179 m), with a ZIP code of 89017.

== Demographics ==
Historical population
Census	Pop.	Note	%±
2010	119		—
2020	124		4.2%
U.S. Decennial Census

== Climate ==
Hiko has a cold desert climate (Köppen: BWk). Summers are hot, and winters feature cool days with cold nights.

Climate data for Hiko, Nevada, 1991–2020 normals, extremes 1964–present
Month	Jan	Feb	Mar	Apr	May	Jun	Jul	Aug	Sep	Oct	Nov	Dec	Year
Record high °F (°C)	75 (24)	81 (27)	86 (30)	93 (34)	101 (38)	107 (42)	110 (43)	106 (41)	104 (40)	99 (37)	83 (28)	74 (23)	110 (43)
Mean maximum °F (°C)	64.3 (17.9)	68.5 (20.3)	76.6 (24.8)	84.2 (29.0)	91.8 (33.2)	100.5 (38.1)	104.0 (40.0)	101.6 (38.7)	96.4 (35.8)	87.6 (30.9)	76.0 (24.4)	64.4 (18.0)	104.7 (40.4)
Mean daily maximum °F (°C)	52.1 (11.2)	55.7 (13.2)	63.2 (17.3)	69.8 (21.0)	79.1 (26.2)	89.4 (31.9)	95.1 (35.1)	93.6 (34.2)	86.4 (30.2)	74.7 (23.7)	61.5 (16.4)	50.7 (10.4)	72.6 (22.6)
Daily mean °F (°C)	38.9 (3.8)	42.1 (5.6)	48.2 (9.0)	54.3 (12.4)	63.0 (17.2)	71.9 (22.2)	78.1 (25.6)	76.4 (24.7)	69.3 (20.7)	58.1 (14.5)	46.1 (7.8)	37.6 (3.1)	57.0 (13.9)
Mean daily minimum °F (°C)	25.7 (−3.5)	28.5 (−1.9)	33.3 (0.7)	38.7 (3.7)	46.9 (8.3)	54.4 (12.4)	61.2 (16.2)	59.2 (15.1)	52.3 (11.3)	41.6 (5.3)	30.7 (−0.7)	24.5 (−4.2)	41.4 (5.2)
Mean minimum °F (°C)	14.4 (−9.8)	17.3 (−8.2)	22.6 (−5.2)	27.7 (−2.4)	35.7 (2.1)	43.5 (6.4)	51.9 (11.1)	50.6 (10.3)	41.5 (5.3)	30.1 (−1.1)	18.5 (−7.5)	13.4 (−10.3)	10.1 (−12.2)
Record low °F (°C)	−3 (−19)	−3 (−19)	6 (−14)	12 (−11)	22 (−6)	33 (1)	43 (6)	32 (0)	28 (−2)	16 (−9)	12 (−11)	−11 (−24)	−11 (−24)
Average precipitation inches (mm)	0.72 (18)	0.92 (23)	0.85 (22)	0.47 (12)	0.46 (12)	0.29 (7.4)	0.51 (13)	0.56 (14)	0.50 (13)	0.71 (18)	0.43 (11)	0.88 (22)	7.30 (185)
Average snowfall inches (cm)	0.9 (2.3)	0.6 (1.5)	0.0 (0.0)	0.0 (0.0)	0.0 (0.0)	0.0 (0.0)	0.0 (0.0)	0.0 (0.0)	0.0 (0.0)	0.0 (0.0)	0.6 (1.5)	0.2 (0.51)	2.3 (5.8)
Average precipitation days (≥ 0.01 in)	4.4	4.7	4.1	3.1	2.7	1.6	2.8	2.7	2.0	2.5	2.2	3.1	35.9
Average snowy days (≥ 0.1 in)	0.6	0.3	0.0	0.0	0.0	0.0	0.0	0.0	0.0	0.0	0.2	0.4	1.5
Source: NOAA

== See also ==
- List of census-designated places in Nevada
- Weepah Spring Wilderness
