= Pahranagat Creek =

Creek in Nevada

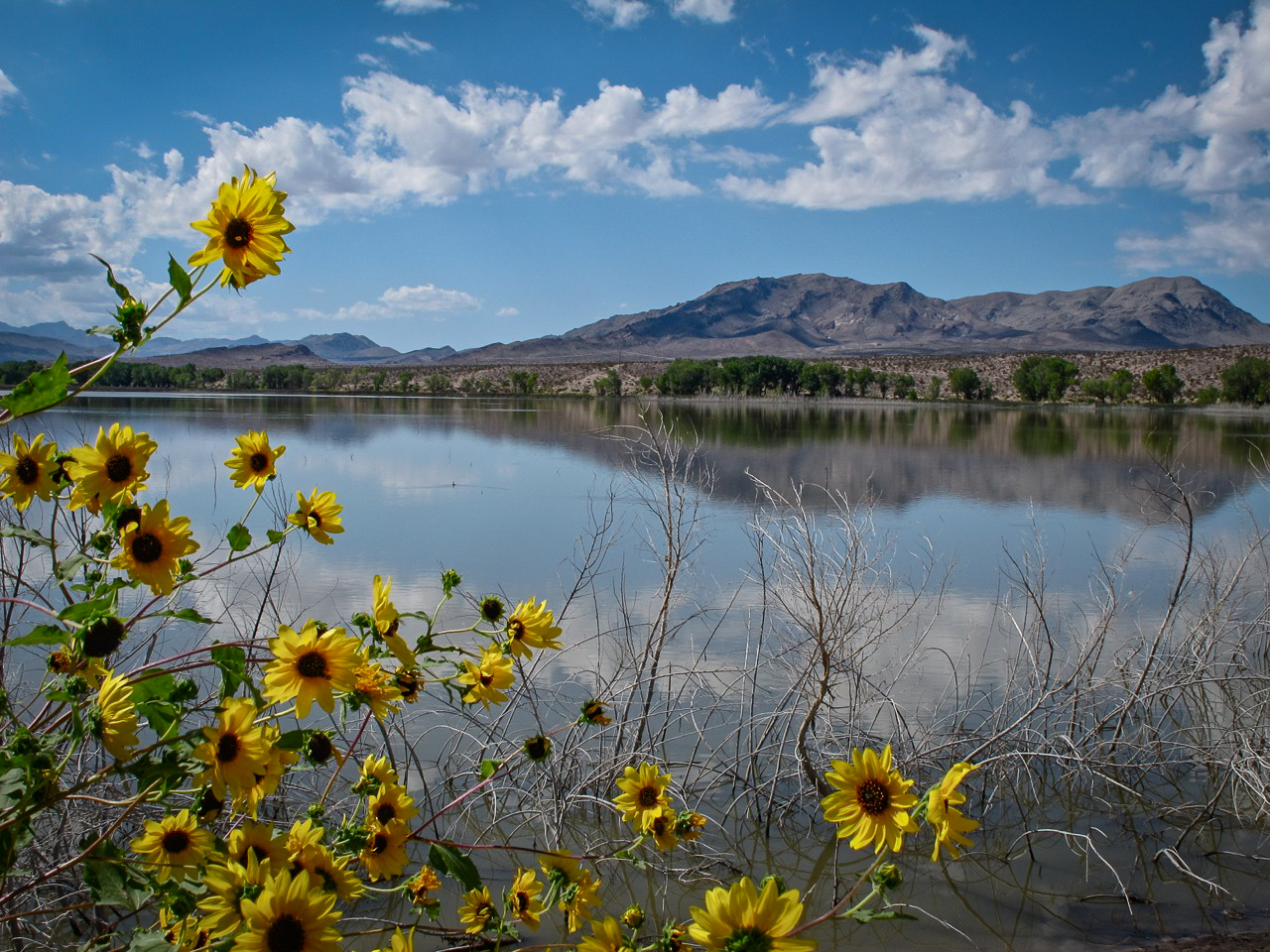
- The Creek flows into the Upper Pahranagat Lake

Location
- Country: United States

Physical characteristics
- Mouth
  - location: Alamo
  - coordinates: 32°20′10″N 115°10′04″W

Pahranagat Creek is a creek in Lincoln County, Nevada. The creek rises south of Alamo and Ash Springs, and flows south into the Upper Pahranagat Lake, which then flows into the Lower Pahranagat Lake. The creek runs parallel to U.S. Route 93 in the Pahranagat Valley.
