= Hiko Spring (Nevada) =

Natural spring in Nevada, US

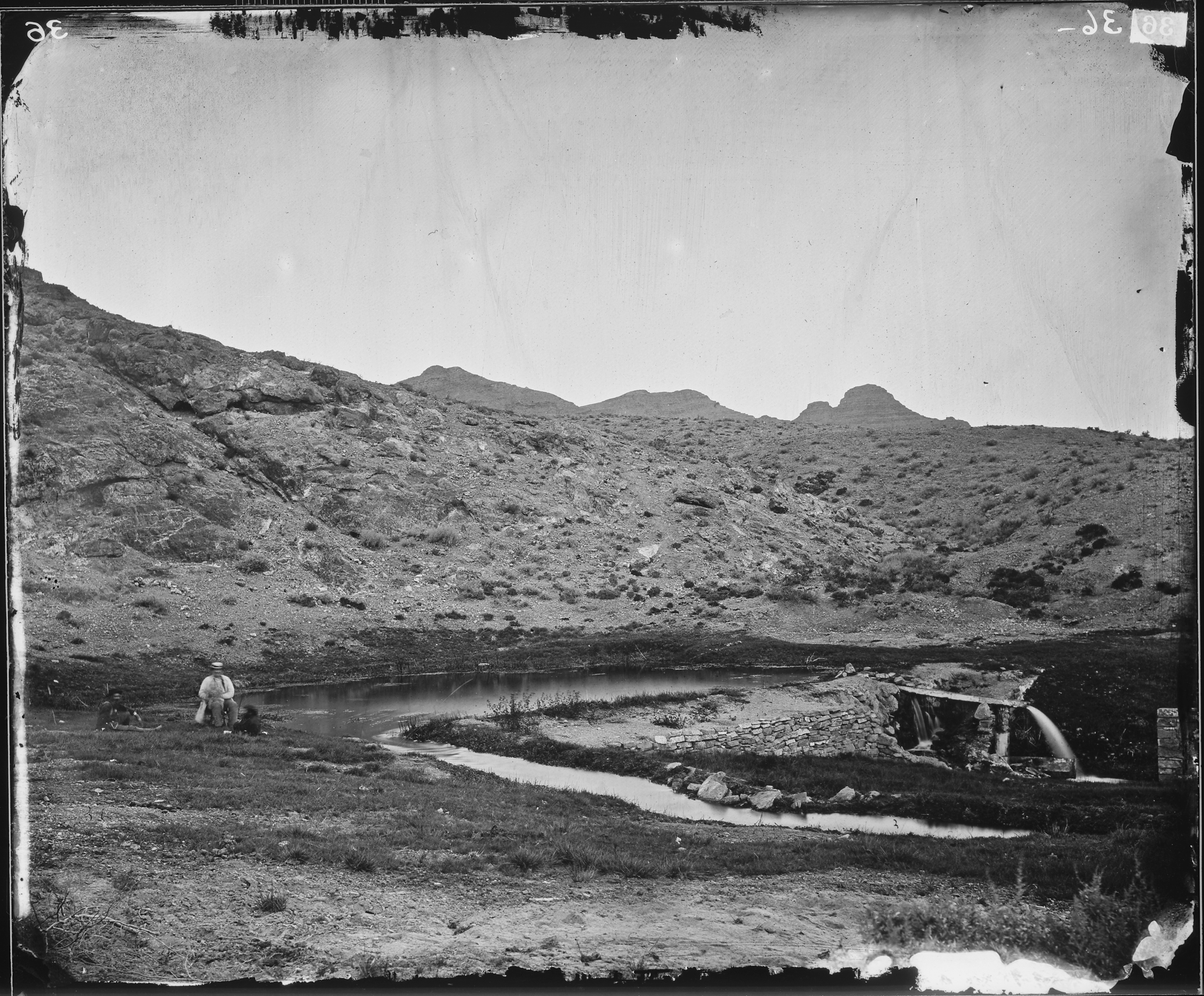
- Hiko Springs in 1871.

- Location within Nevada Location within the United States
- Location: Hiko, Nevada
- Coordinates: 37°35′54.37″N 115°12′55.22″W
- Temperature: 65 °F (18 °C)—70 °F (21 °C)

Hiko Spring, also spelled Hyko Springs, is a natural spring located at the farming community of Hiko, in Lincoln County, eastern Nevada, United States. Its cool water flowing from the hillside spring is used for irrigation.

Hiko Spring flows beyond the spring for about 5 miles (8.0 km) in the northern end of the Pahranagat Valley. It supplies irrigation water for valley farms there, and for riparian habitats in the Key Pittman Wildlife Management Area. It fills the small Nesbitt Lake and Frenchie Lake within the Nevada state wildlife preserve.

According to the GNIS there is a spring named Hiko Springs in Clark County.

== See also ==
- Hiko Range
