= Upper Pahranagat Lake =

Lake in Nevada, U.S.

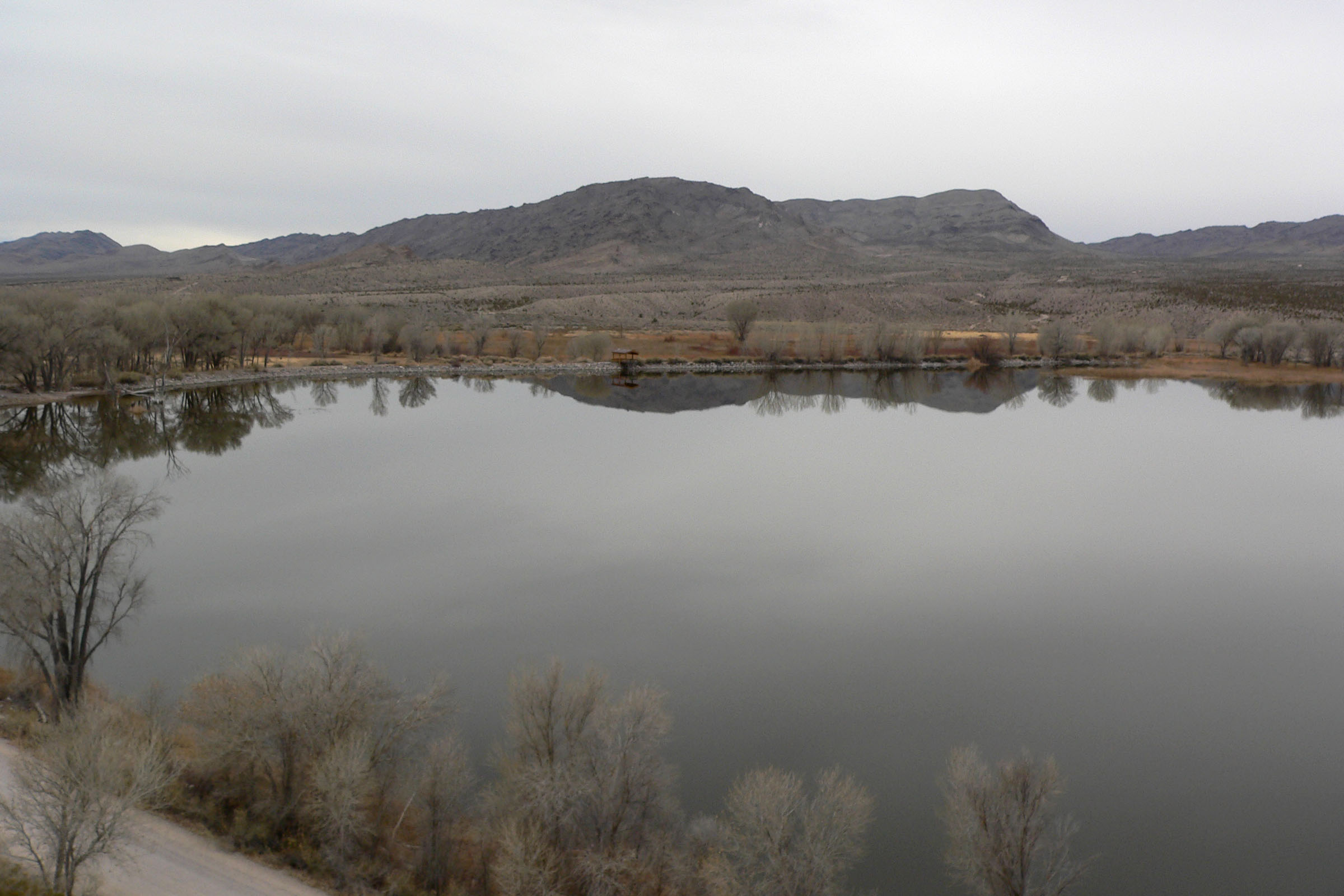
- Interactive map of Upper Pahranagat Lake
- Coordinates: 37°17′59.14″N 115°7′34.42″W

Upper Pahranagat Lake is a lake located in Pahranagat National Wildlife Refuge, within the Pahranagat Valley south of Alamo, Nevada. The lake is a popular fishing spot and campsite.

The lake is fed by the Pahranagat Creek, and is connected to the Lower Pahranagat Lake via a short stream that follows U.S. Route 93.
