= Black Canyon Petroglyphs =

- U.S. National Register of Historic Places
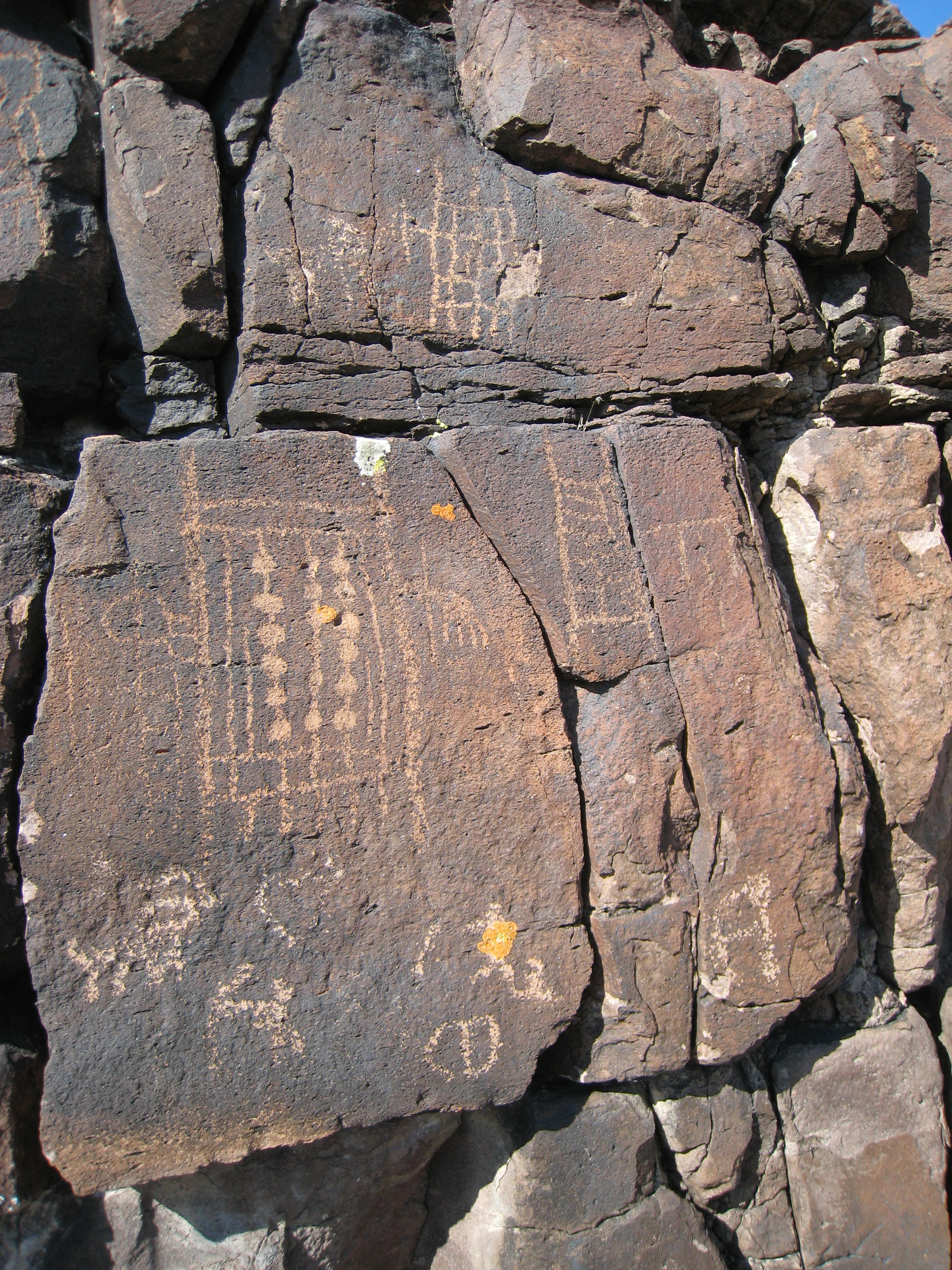
- Nearest city: Alamo, Nevada
- Area: 10 acres (4.0 ha)
- NRHP reference No.: 75001113
- Added to NRHP: May 27, 1975

The Black Canyon Petroglyphs is an area of prehistoric petroglyphs in Lincoln County, Nevada that is listed on the U.S. National Register of Historic Places. Located in the Pahranagat National Wildlife Refuge, they are accessible to the public.

A 10-acre (4.0 ha) area was listed on the NRHP in 1975 as an archeological historic district having significant potential for information to be learned in the future.

An extensive project to document the petroglyphs, and enable further learning, was completed with 416 hours of volunteer labor in 2009. About 100 rock art panels at seven locations were photographed, drawn, and otherwise observed.
