= Alamo bolide impact =

Prehistoric impact event at a site now within the U.S. state of Nevada

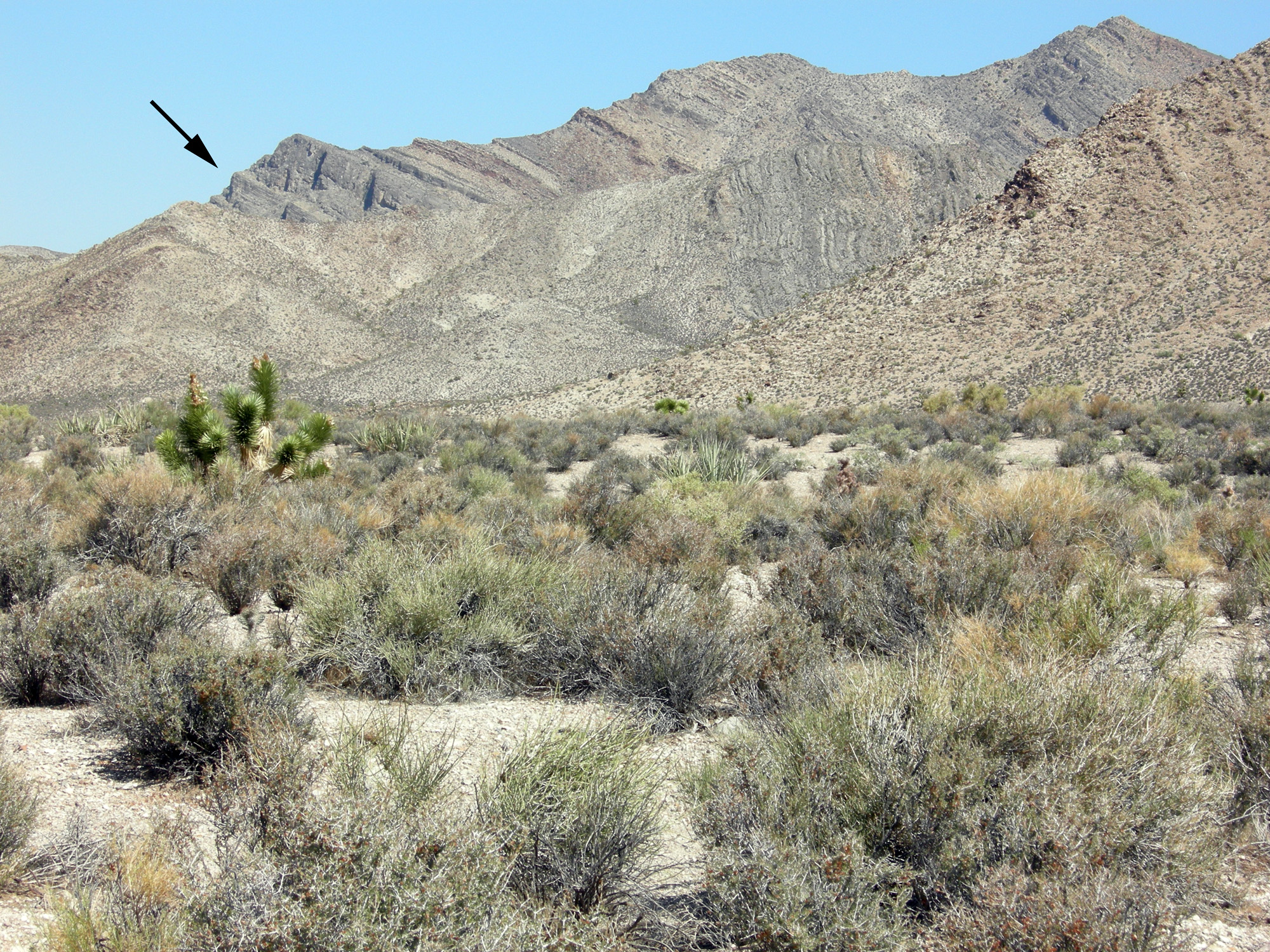
- Landscape showing Alamo impact breccia (arrow) near Hancock Summit, Pahranagat Range, Nevada.

Impact crater structure
- Age: 377-378 Ma

The Alamo bolide impact occurred 377–378 million years ago, when one or more hypervelocity objects from space slammed into shallow marine waters at a site that is now the Devonian Guilmette Formation of the Worthington Mountains and Schell Creek Range of southeastern Nevada; the event is named for breccias of metamorphosed crushed rock deposits, found near the town of Alamo, Nevada (the "Alamo Breccia"). This catastrophic impact event resulted in what is one of the best-exposed and has become the most accurately dated impact events; it occurred within the Frasnian age of the Devonian at about 377-378 Ma, a moment in time that was about 5.9 Ma prior to the Frasnian/Famennian extinction events, which it is unlikely to have affected.

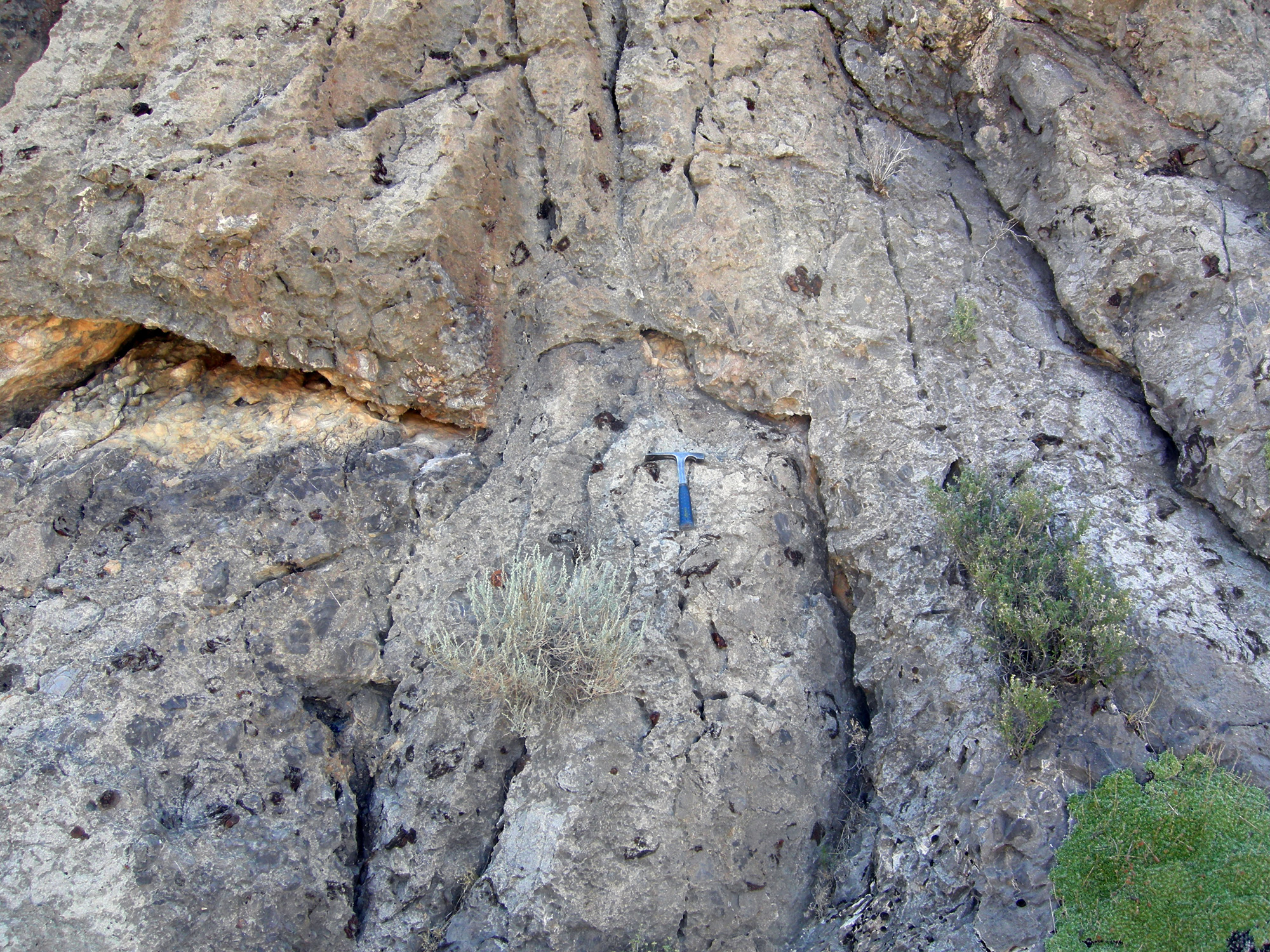
Alamo impact breccia near Hancock Summit, Pahranagat Range, Nevada.

The actual impact site has not yet been significantly documented—even its precise diameter and its internal structural features are not yet clear enough to make speculations on the mass and trajectory genuinely useful. The "tectonic overprint", the subsequent geologic modifications since the event, have distorted the picture; the distribution of the breccia has been compressed and skewed by west-to-east thrust faults across the area. Insufficient detail does not permit a precise reconstruction of the Devonian paleogeography, beyond the fact that it was a "wet-target" impact in a reef front where carbonates were being built up in marine shallows.

The impact site contains megabreccia of gigantic displaced blocks, together with several attributes familiar from other impact sites: shocked quartz, elevated iridium levels, and spherical lapilli. John E. Warme, one of the geologists who first recognized the geologic anomalies as the results of a bolide, estimates that the total volume of limestone reef deposits and bedrock that was smashed, deformed, partially melted or shifted during the Alamo event at 1,000 cubic kilometers. "Ensuing tsunamis rearranged much of the debris" he adds. Other researchers have discovered elevated iridium in fault gouge at Devil's Gate North and Tempiute Mountain. ^{[4]}

After initial resistance from the Geological Society of America, the first paper published concerning the Alamo Breccia was co-authored by John Warme, Brian Ackman, Yarmanto, and Alan Chamberlain in the 1993 Nevada Petroleum Society Field Conference Guidebook.

== See also ==
- Pahranagat Valley
