= Pahranagat Range =

Mountain range in Nevada, United States

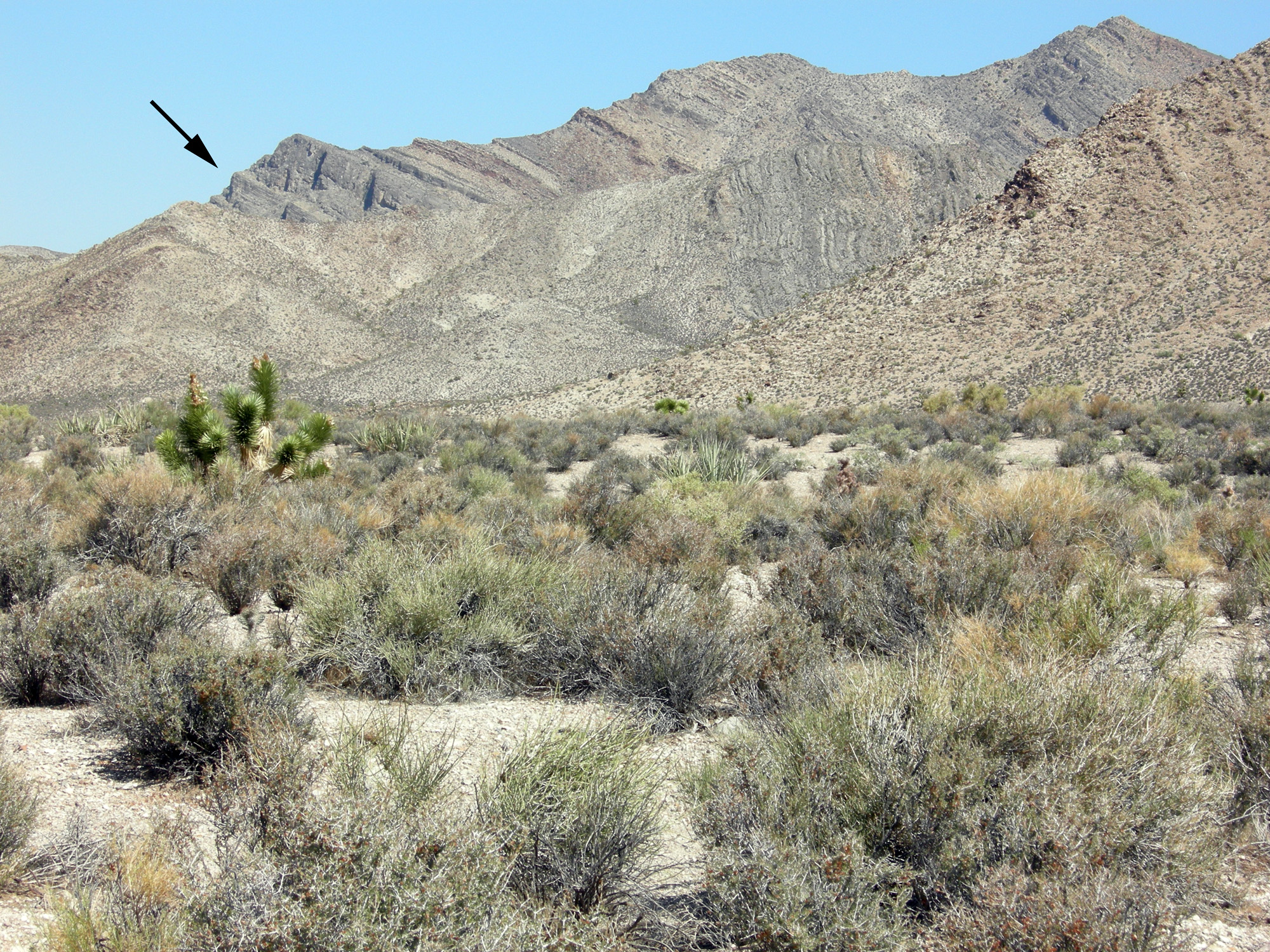
- Landscape showing the Devonian Alamo bolide impact breccia (arrow) near Hancock Summit

Highest point
- Elevation: 2,268 m (7,441 ft)

Geography
- Location within Nevada
- Country: United States
- State: Nevada
- District: Lincoln County
- Range coordinates: 37°22′4.855″N 115°22′7.083″W
- Topo map: USGS Badger Spring

The Pahranagat Range is a mountain range in Lincoln County, Nevada.

== See also ==
- Pahranagat Valley
- Pahranagat National Wildlife Refuge
- Alamo bolide impact
