= Breccia =

Rock composed of angular fragments

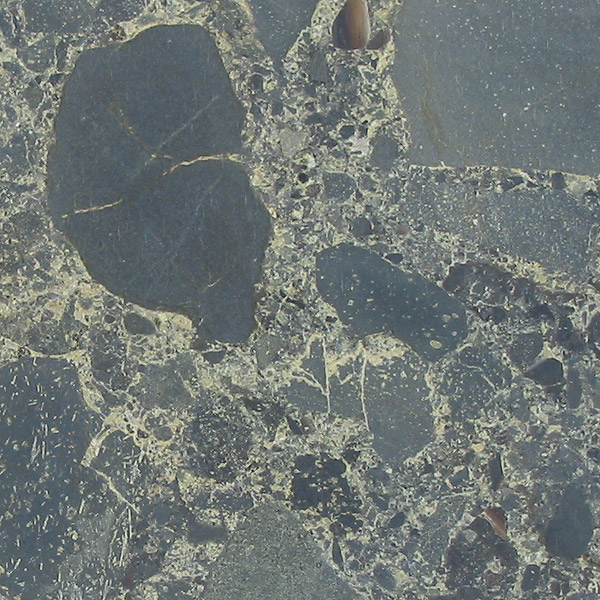
Basalt breccia in the Canary Islands; green groundmass is composed of epidote

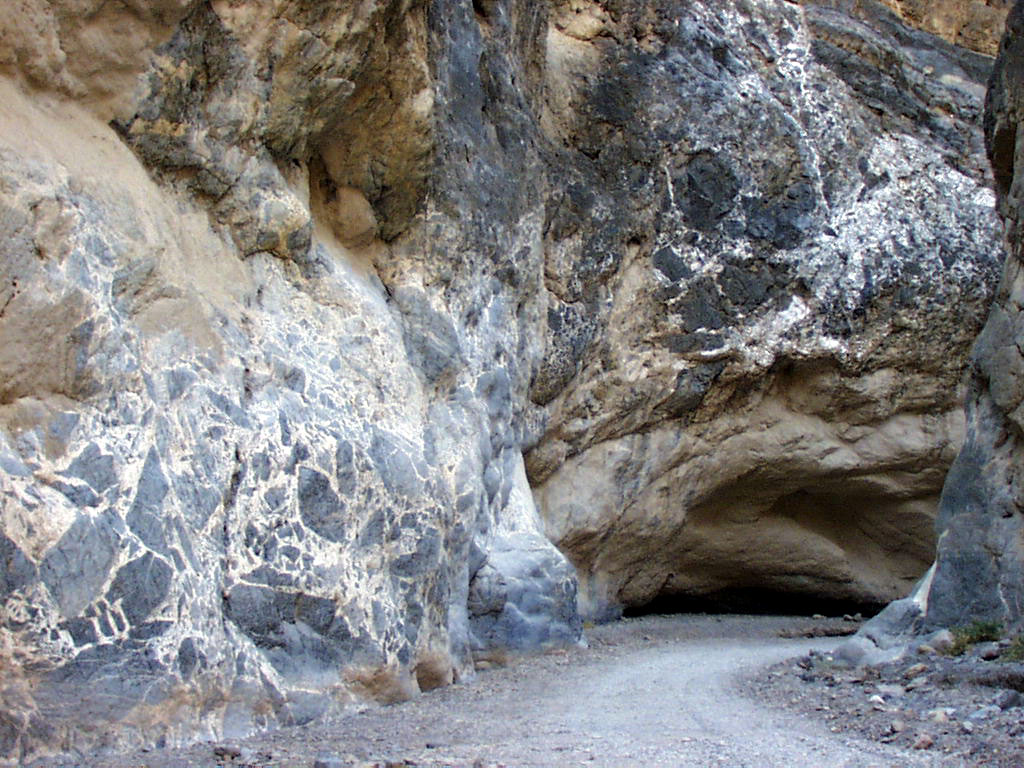
Megabreccia (left) at Titus Canyon Narrows, Death Valley National Park, California

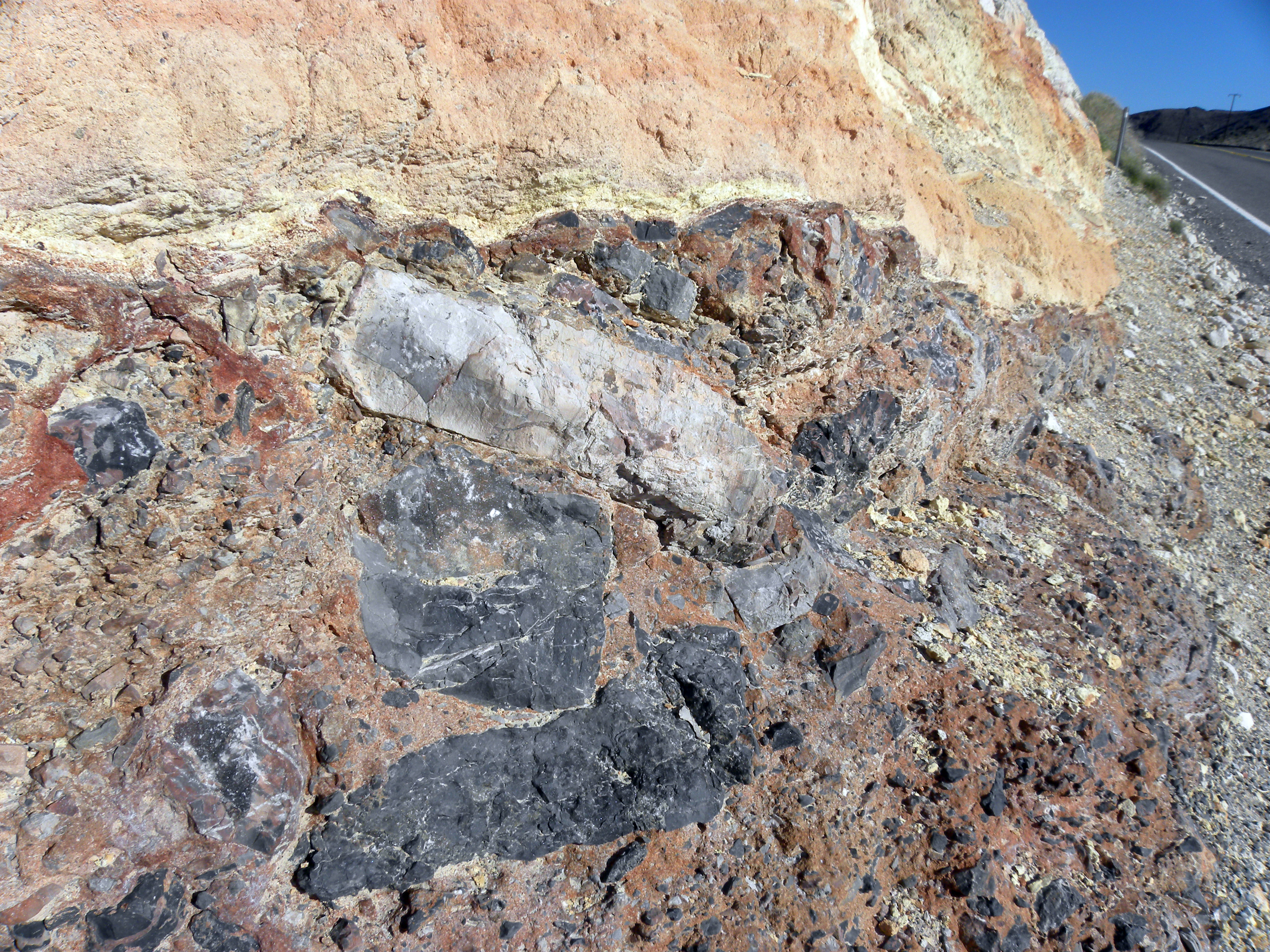
Tertiary breccia at Resting Springs Pass, Mojave Desert, California

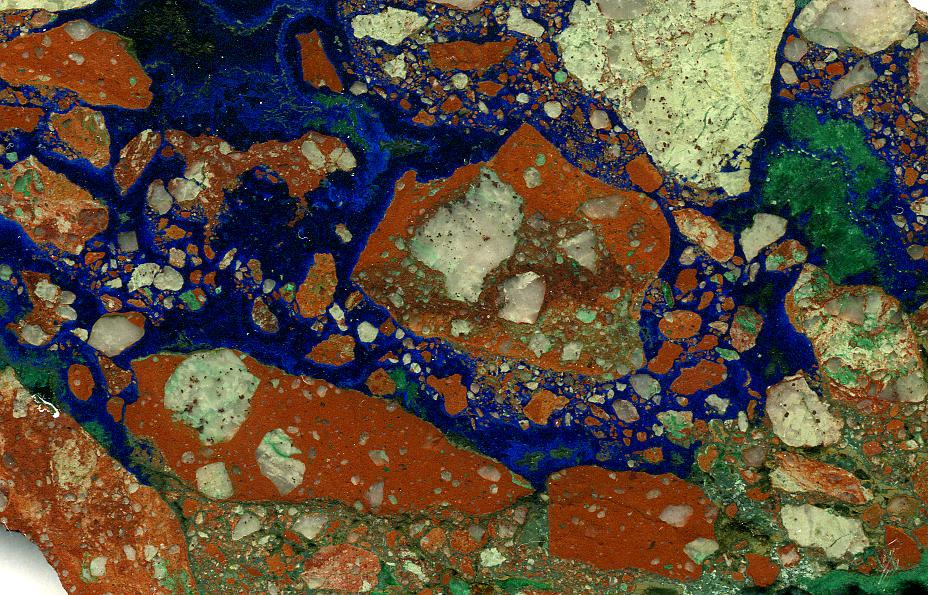
Unusual breccia cemented by azurite and malachite, Morenci Mine, Arizona

Breccia (/ˈbrɛ(t)ʃiə/ BRETCH-ee-ə, BRESH-; Italian: [ˈbrettʃa]; Italian for 'breach') is a clastic rock composed of angular, coarse (Note: 2 mm across or larger) fragments bound by a finer-grained matrix and/or cement.

The word has its origins in the Italian language, in which it means 'rubble'. A breccia may have a variety of different origins, as indicated by the named types including sedimentary breccia, fault or tectonic breccia, igneous breccia, impact breccia, and hydrothermal breccia.

A megabreccia is a breccia composed of very large rock fragments, sometimes kilometers across, which can be formed by landslides, impact events, or caldera collapse.

== Types ==
Breccia is composed of coarse rock fragments held together by cement or a fine-grained matrix. Like conglomerate, breccia contains at least 30 percent of gravel-sized particles (particles over 2mm in size), but it is distinguished from conglomerate because the rock fragments have sharp edges that have not been worn down. These indicate that the gravel was deposited very close to its source area, since otherwise the edges would have been rounded during transport. Most of the rounding of rock fragments takes place within the first few kilometers of transport, though complete rounding of pebbles of very hard rock may take up to 300 kilometers (190 mi) of river transport.

A megabreccia is a breccia containing very large rock fragments, from at least a meter in size to greater than 400 meters. In some cases, the clasts are so large that the brecciated nature of the rock is not obvious. Megabreccias can be formed by landslides, impact events, or caldera collapse.

Breccias are further classified by their mechanism of formation.

=== Sedimentary ===
Sedimentary breccia is breccia formed by sedimentary processes. For example, scree deposited at the base of a cliff may become cemented to form a talus breccia without ever experiencing transport that might round the rock fragments. Thick sequences of sedimentary (colluvial) breccia are generally formed next to fault scarps in grabens.

Sedimentary breccia may be formed by submarine debris flows. Turbidites occur as fine-grained peripheral deposits to sedimentary breccia flows.

In a karst terrain, a collapse breccia may form due to collapse of rock into a sinkhole or in cave development. Collapse breccias also form by dissolution of underlying evaporite beds.

=== Fault ===
Fault or tectonic breccia results from the grinding action of two fault blocks as they slide past each other. Subsequent cementation of these broken fragments may occur by means of the introduction of mineral matter in groundwater.

=== Igneous ===
Igneous clastic rocks can be divided into two classes:

1. Broken, fragmental rocks associated with volcanic eruptions, both of the lava and pyroclastic type;
2. Broken, fragmental rocks produced by intrusive processes, usually associated with plutons or porphyry stocks.

==== Volcanic ====
Volcanic pyroclastic rocks are formed by explosive eruption of lava and any rocks which are entrained within the eruptive column. This may include rocks plucked off the wall of the magma conduit, or physically picked up by the ensuing pyroclastic surge. Lavas, especially rhyolite and dacite flows, tend to form clastic volcanic rocks by a process known as autobrecciation. This occurs when the thick, nearly solid lava breaks up into blocks and these blocks are then reincorporated into the lava flow again and mixed in with the remaining liquid magma. The resulting breccia is uniform in rock type and chemical composition.

Caldera collapse leads to the formation of megabreccias, which are sometimes mistaken for outcrops of the caldera floor. These are instead blocks of precaldera rock, often coming from the unstable oversteepened rim of the caldera. They are distinguished from mesobreccias whose clasts are less than a meter in size and which form layers in the caldera floor. Some clasts of caldera megabreccias can be over a kilometer in length.

Within the volcanic conduits of explosive volcanoes the volcanic breccia environment merges into the intrusive breccia environment. There the upwelling lava tends to solidify during quiescent intervals only to be shattered by ensuing eruptions. This produces an alloclastic volcanic breccia.

==== Intrusive ====
Clastic rocks are also commonly found in shallow subvolcanic intrusions such as porphyry stocks, granites and kimberlite pipes, where they are transitional with volcanic breccias. Intrusive rocks can become brecciated in appearance by multiple stages of intrusion, especially if fresh magma is intruded into partly consolidated or solidified magma. This may be seen in many granite intrusions where later aplite veins form a late-stage stockwork through earlier phases of the granite mass. When particularly intense, the rock may appear as a chaotic breccia.

Clastic rocks in mafic and ultramafic intrusions have been found and form via several processes:

- consumption and melt-mingling with wall rocks, where the wall rocks are softened and gradually invaded by the hotter ultramafic intrusion (producing taxitic texture);
- accumulation of rocks which fall through the magma chamber from the roof, forming chaotic remnants;
- autobrecciation of partly consolidated cumulate by fresh magma injections;
- accumulation of xenoliths within a feeder conduit or vent conduit, forming a diatreme breccia pipe.

=== Impact ===
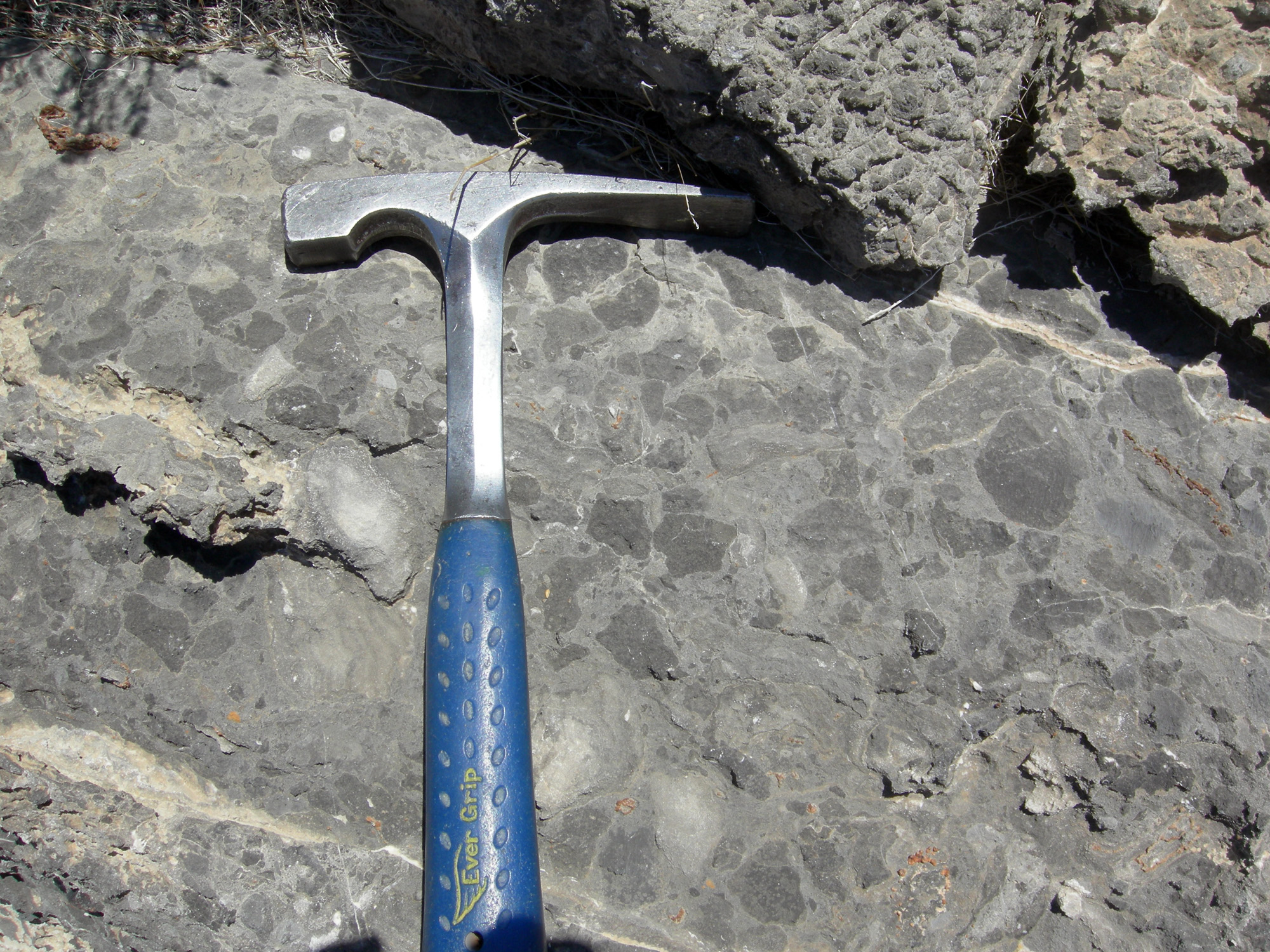
Alamo bolide impact breccia (Late Devonian, Frasnian) near Hancock Summit, Pahranagat Range, Nevada

Impact breccias are thought to be diagnostic of an impact event such as an asteroid or comet striking the Earth and are normally found at impact craters. Impact breccia, a type of impactite, forms during the process of impact cratering when large meteorites or comets impact with the Earth or other rocky planets or asteroids. Breccia of this type may be present on or beneath the floor of the crater, in the rim, or in the ejecta expelled beyond the crater.

Impact breccia may be identified by its occurrence in or around a known impact crater, and/or an association with other products of impact cratering such as shatter cones, impact glass, shocked minerals, and chemical and isotopic evidence of contamination with extraterrestrial material (e.g., iridium and osmium anomalies). An example of an impact breccia is the Neugrund breccia, which was formed in the Neugrund impact.

=== Hydrothermal ===
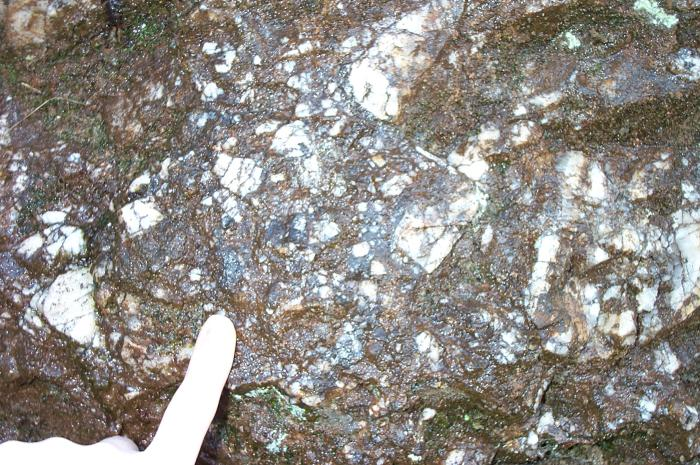
Hydrothermal breccia in the Cloghleagh Iron Mine, near Blessington in Ireland, composed mainly of quartz and manganese oxides, the result of seismic activity about 12 million years ago

Hydrothermal breccias usually form at shallow crustal levels (<1 km) between 150 and 350 °C, when seismic or volcanic activity causes a void to open along a fault deep underground. The void draws in hot water, and as pressure in the cavity drops, the water violently boils. In addition, the sudden opening of a cavity causes rock at the sides of the fault to destabilise and implode inwards, and the broken rock gets caught up in a churning mixture of rock, steam and boiling water. Rock fragments collide with each other and the sides of the void, and the angular fragments become more rounded. Volatile gases are lost to the steam phase as boiling continues, in particular carbon dioxide. As a result, the chemistry of the fluids changes and ore minerals rapidly precipitate. Breccia-hosted ore deposits are quite common.

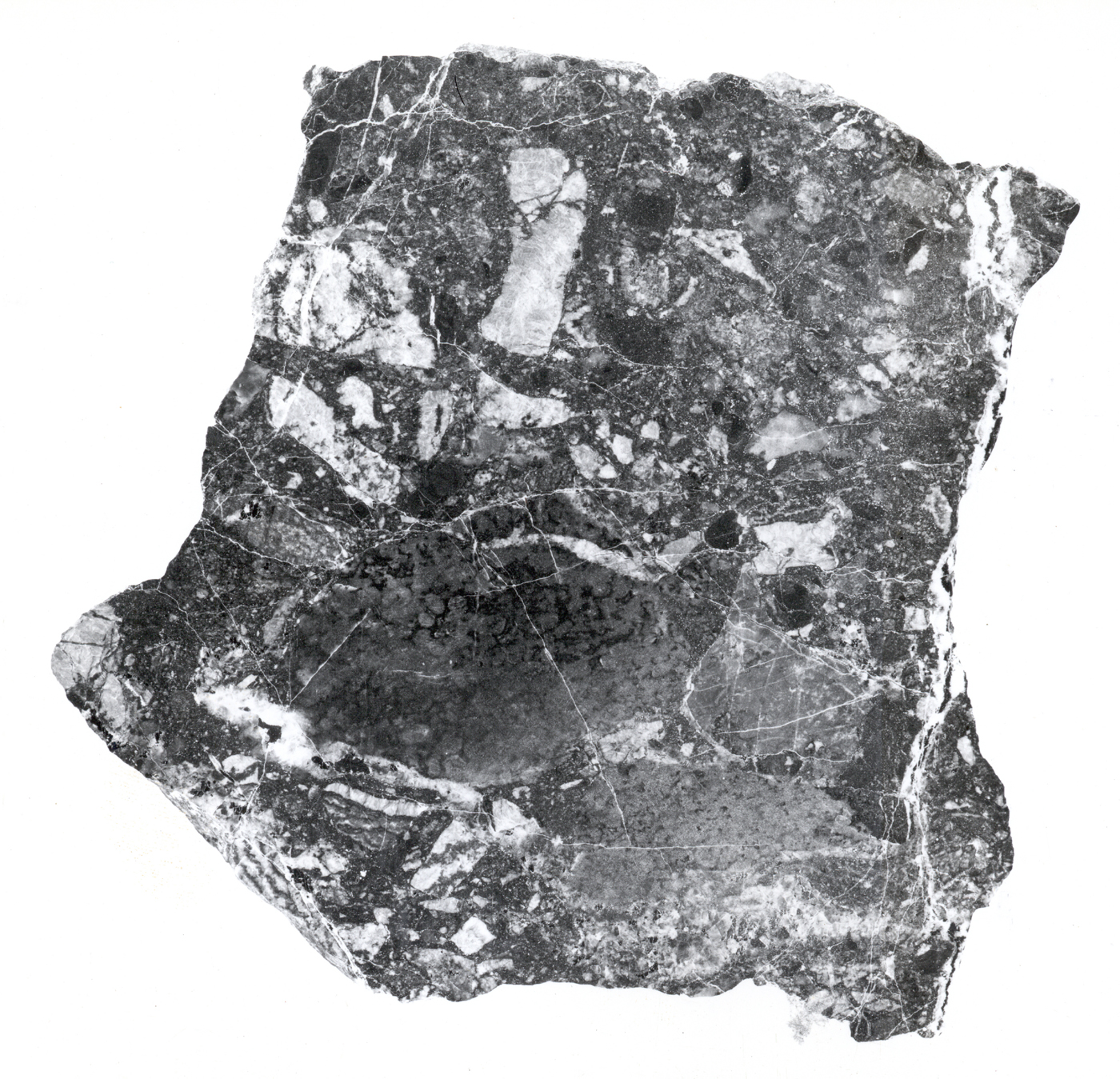
Silicified and mineralized breccia. Light gray is mostly dolomite with a little translucent quartz. Dark gray is jasperoid and ore minerals. Veinlet along lower edge of specimen contains sphalerite in carbonates. Pend Oreille mine, Pend Oreille County, Washington

The morphology of breccias associated with ore deposits varies from tabular sheeted veins and clastic dikes associated with overpressured sedimentary strata, to large-scale intrusive diatreme breccias (breccia pipes), or even some synsedimentary diatremes formed solely by the overpressure of pore fluid within sedimentary basins. Hydrothermal breccias are usually formed by hydrofracturing of rocks by highly pressured hydrothermal fluids. They are typical of the epithermal ore environment and are intimately associated with intrusive-related ore deposits such as skarns, greisens and porphyry-related mineralisation. Epithermal deposits are mined for copper, silver and gold.

In the mesothermal regime, at much greater depths, fluids under lithostatic pressure can be released during seismic activity associated with mountain building. The pressurised fluids ascend towards shallower crustal levels that are under lower hydrostatic pressure. On their journey, high-pressure fluids crack rock by hydrofracturing, forming an angular in situ breccia. Rounding of rock fragments is less common in the mesothermal regime, as the formational event is brief. If boiling occurs, methane and hydrogen sulfide may be lost to the steam phase, and ore may precipitate. Mesothermal deposits are often mined for gold.

== Ornamental uses ==
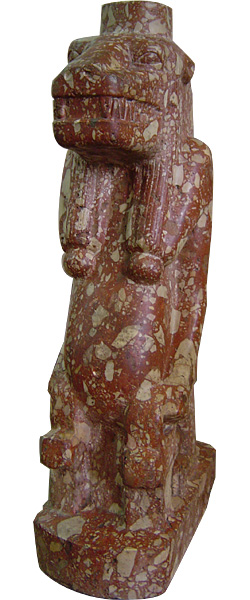
Breccia statue of the Ancient Egyptian goddess Tawaret

For thousands of years, the striking visual appearance of breccias has made them a popular sculptural and architectural material. Breccia was used for column bases in the Minoan palace of Knossos on Crete in about 1800 BC. Breccia was used on a limited scale by the ancient Egyptians; one of the best-known examples is the statue of the goddess Tawaret in the British Museum. Breccia was regarded by the Romans as an especially precious stone and was often used in high-profile public buildings. Many types of marble are brecciated, such as Breccia Oniciata.

In ancient Japanese culture, 'sazare ishi' (細石) were considered auspicious rocks, representing prayers for the emperor's long reign and are as such mentioned in the Japanese National anthem.

== See also ==
- Crackle breccia
- Dallasite – Greenish rock found in British Columbia
- Impact crater – Circular depression in a solid astronomical body formed by the impact of a smaller object
- Hydrothermal circulation – Circulation of water driven by heat exchange
- Vein (geology) – Sheetlike body of crystallized minerals within a rock
- Kimberlite – Igneous rock which sometimes contains diamonds
- Regolith – Layer of loose, superficial deposits covering solid rock
