= Dallasite =

Greenish rock found in British Columbia

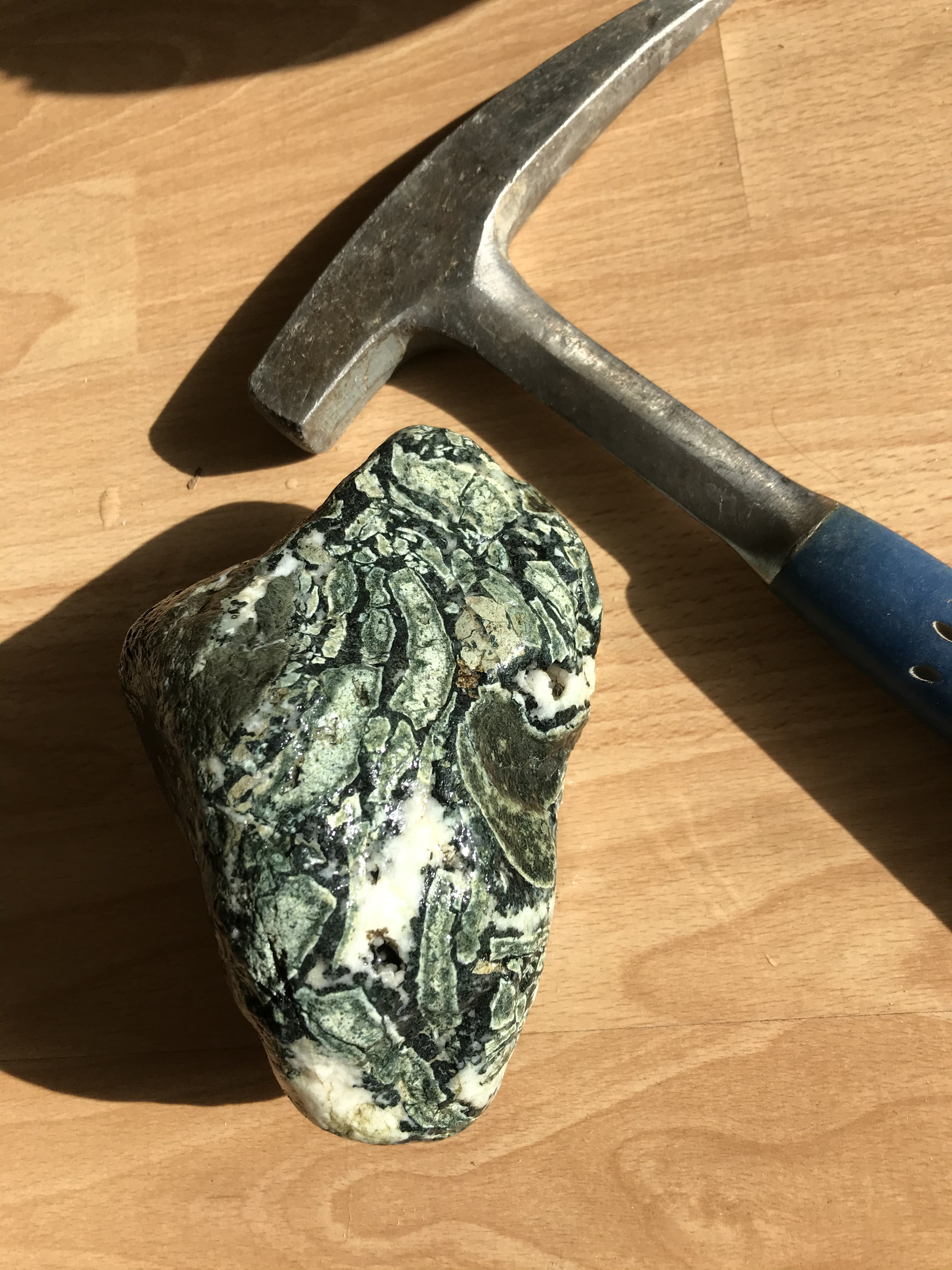
A specimen of dallasite from Vancouver Island

Dallasite is a type of rock, specifically a breccia, made of subequant to rectangular or distinctly elongate, curvilinear shards that represent the spalled rims of pillow basalt (see: Hyaloclastite). This material is commonly partly altered to chlorite, epidote, quartz and carbonate, for which the local term 'dallasite' has been coined. Nixon et al. describe the shards as quench-fragmented rinds of tholeiitic pillows in the basal pillow basalt unit of the Triassic Karmutsen flood basalts (Wrangellia terrane) on northern Vancouver Island. The shards are devitrified and altered to chlorite, quartz, epidote and zeolite. The stone dallasite is named after Dallas Road, Victoria, British Columbia. It is considered the unofficial stone of British Columbia's capital city. Dallasite is found in Triassic volcanic rocks of Vancouver Island and is considered the third most important gem material in British Columbia.
