= Crackle breccia =

Crackle breccia is a type of breccia where the clasts have been separated by planes of rupture, but have experienced little or no displacement. The individual clasts in crackle breccia must not have experienced more than 10° average rotation.
