= Lower Pahranagat Lake =

Lake in Nevada, United States

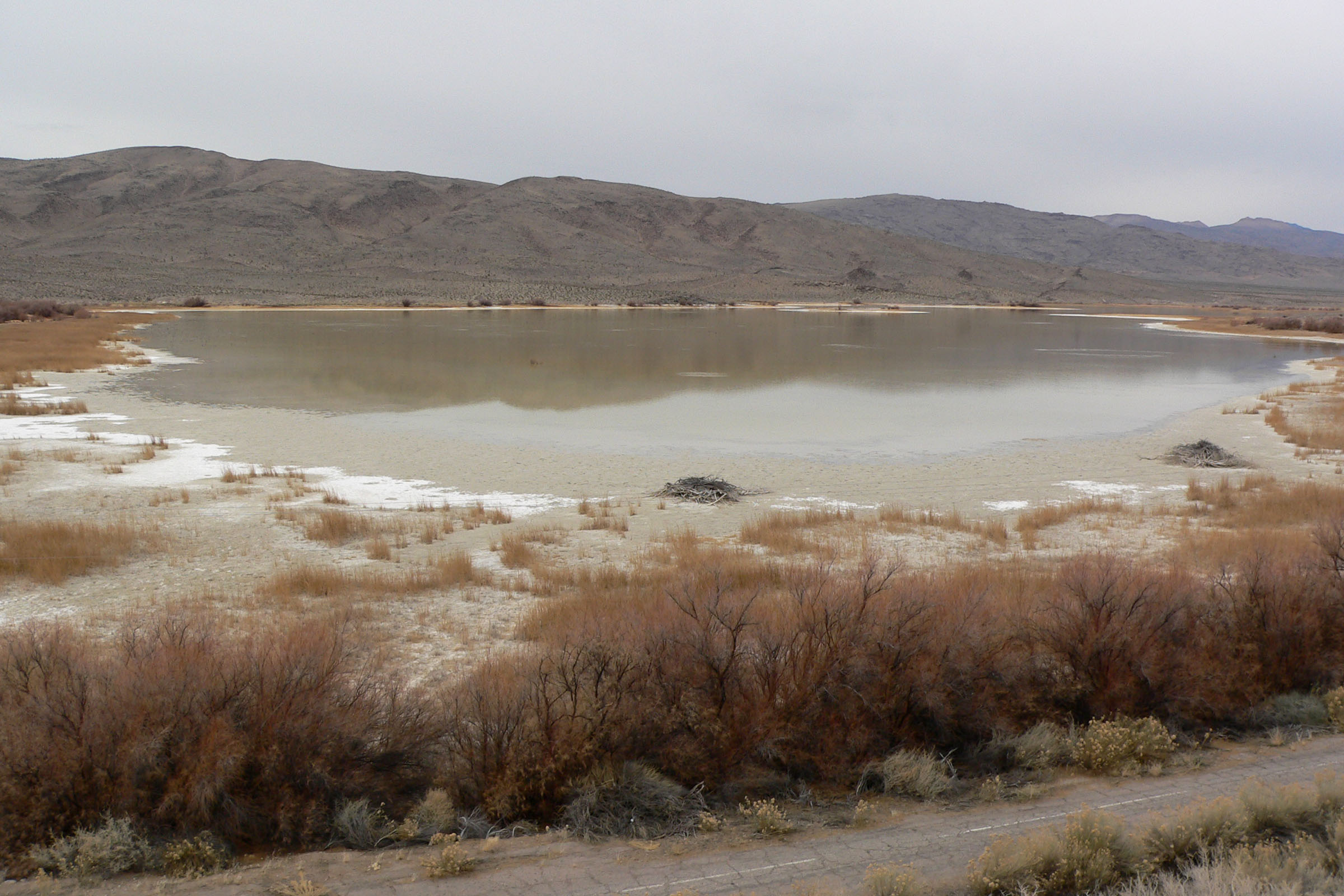
- Interactive map of Lower Pahranagat Lake
- Coordinates: 37°13′13.10″N 115°5′6.73″W

Lower Pahranagat Lake is a lake located in Pahranagat National Wildlife Refuge, within the Pahranagat Valley south of Alamo, Nevada. The lake is a popular fishing spot and campsite.

The lake is connected to the Upper Pahranagat Lake via a short stream that follows U.S. Route 93.
