= Pahranagat Valley =

Valley in Lincoln County, Nevada, United States

Coordinates: 37°17′35″N 115°07′28″W

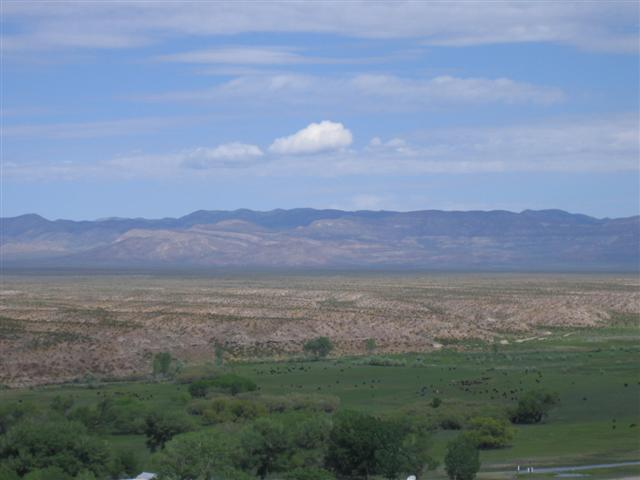
A ranch near Ash Springs

The Pahranagat Valley is a Tonopah Basin landform in Lincoln County, Nevada.

The more fertile part of Pahranagat Valley is a narrow ribbon of green (no more than 1-mile (1.6 km) wide), like an oasis in the vast Nevada desert. It is approximately 40 miles (64 km) long, running north and south, and is watered by three large natural springs of water (Hiko Springs, Crystal Springs, and Ash Springs) and many smaller ones as well. It has four lakes, two near the north end of the valley (Nesbitt Lake and Frenchie Lake) and two towards the south end (Upper Pahranagat Lake and Lower Pahranagat Lake). The southern half of the valley, including the two lakes, is home to the Pahranagat Valley National Wildlife Refuge.

Pahranagat Valley is bordered on the west by a range of mountains called the Mount Irish Range and then the Pahranagat Range. It is bordered on the east by the Hiko Range. State Route 318 and then U.S. Route 93 traverse the entire length of the valley.

The more inhabited areas in Pahranagat Valley include (from north to south) Hiko, Ash Springs, Richardville, and Alamo, with the town of Alamo being the largest and where all of the schools for the valley are located. The closest town to Pahranagat Valley is over 50 miles (80 km) to the east at Caliente, Nevada.

== Etymology ==
Pahranagat has been derived by various linguists and others from the Southern Paiute language, although its meaning has been debated.

== History ==
The Crystal Springs area, used as a watering spot and campsite, was a principal stop-over on the Mormon Trail Alternate Route. In the late 1850s, the area was a haven for outlaws who pastured hundreds of heads of stolen cattle and horses on its meadows.

Silver ore was discovered in 1865 on Mount Irish, and Logan sprang briefly into existence. A mill to process the ore was built in Hiko, the ruins of which are still in existence.

Since the late 19th century, Pahranagat Valley has been primarily an agricultural community. Presently, it is also a bedroom community for many who work in Las Vegas, even though the commute is over 100 miles (160 km) one way.

== Geology ==
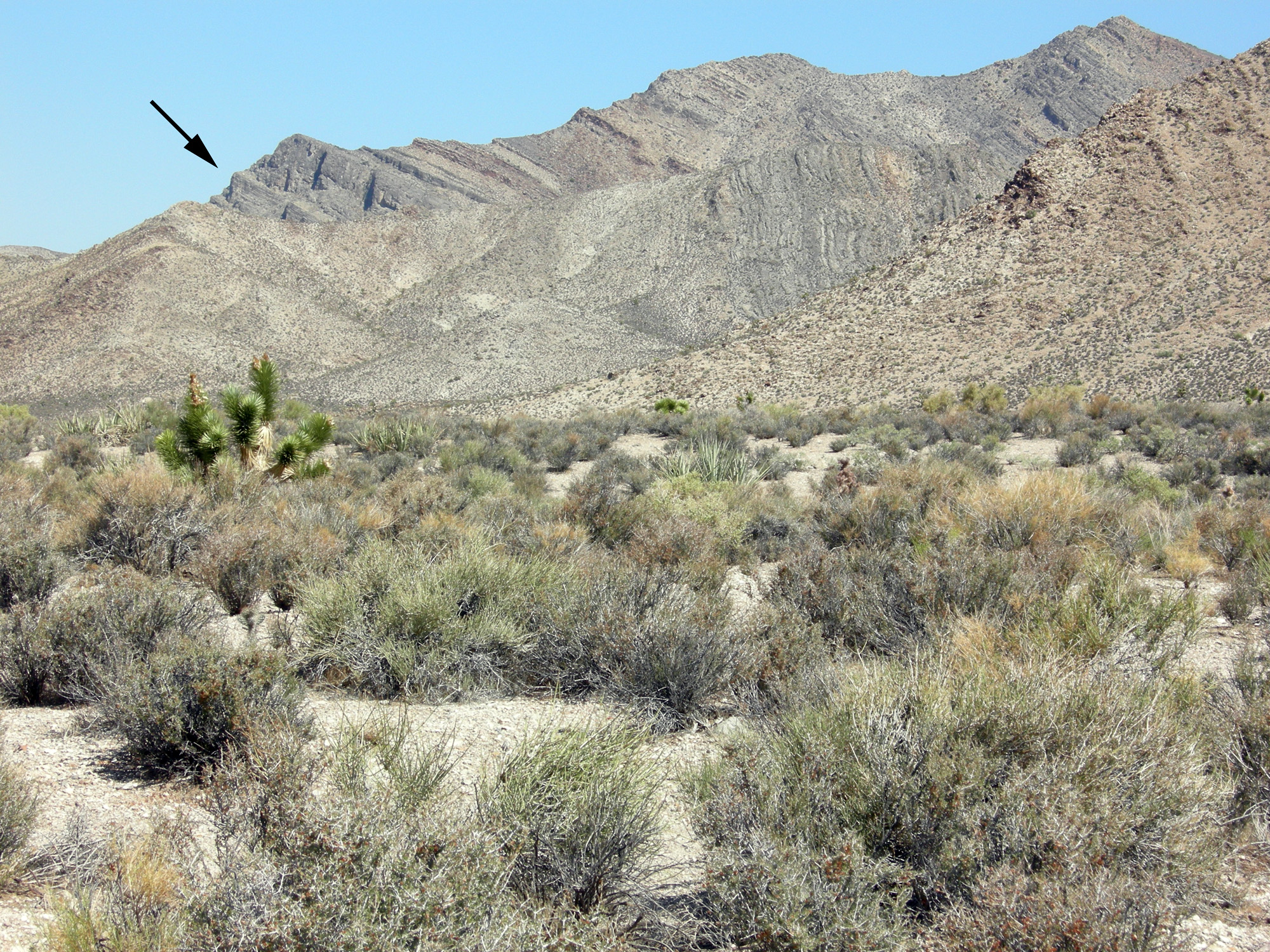
Landscape showing Alamo impact breccia (arrow) near Hancock Summit, Pahranagat Range, Nevada.

The geology of the region includes the Alamo meteor impact, which scattered layers of impact debris across the area near Alamo.

== Flora and fauna ==
The Pahranagat Valley is home to several endangered species, like Fluminicola merriami, Bufo nelsoni, and endemic subspecies of Gila robusta, Rhinichthys osculus, Crenichthys baileyi, and Microtus montanus.
