= Ash Springs, Nevada =

Unincorporated community located in the State of Nevada, United States

- Unincorporated community
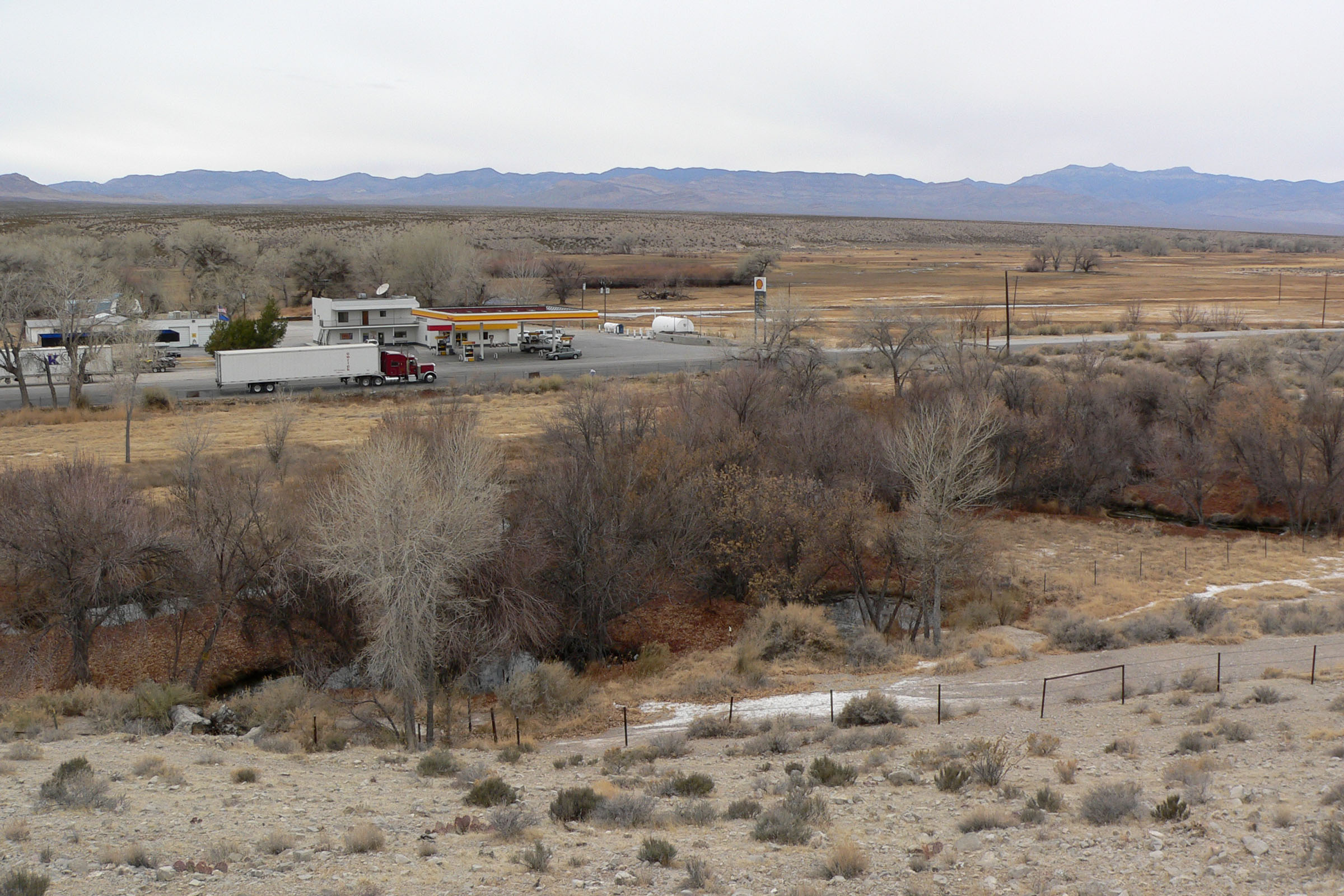
- Ash Springs in 2007

- Location within Nevada Location within the United States
- Coordinates: 37°27′38″N 115°11′35″W
- Country: United States
- State: Nevada
- County: Lincoln
- Elevation: 3,616 ft (1,102 m)
- Time zone: UTC-8 (Pacific (PST))
  - Summer (DST): UTC-7 (PDT)
- GNIS feature ID: 855956

Ash Springs is an unincorporated community in the Pahranagat Valley of Lincoln County, Nevada. The community's principal industry is ranching. Ash Springs is named for the desert ash trees growing nearby.

== Hot springs ==
Ash Springs is home to naturally occurring hot springs. The hot springs are located on BLM land. The water emerges from several springs at a temperature of 97 °F/36 °C, and cools to 95 °F/35 °C as it flows into a large mineral water soaking pool approximately 15 feet in diameter. The pool is a known habitat for Naegleria fowleri. A young boy contracted the parasite while swimming in July 2023. He died several days later.

== Gallery ==
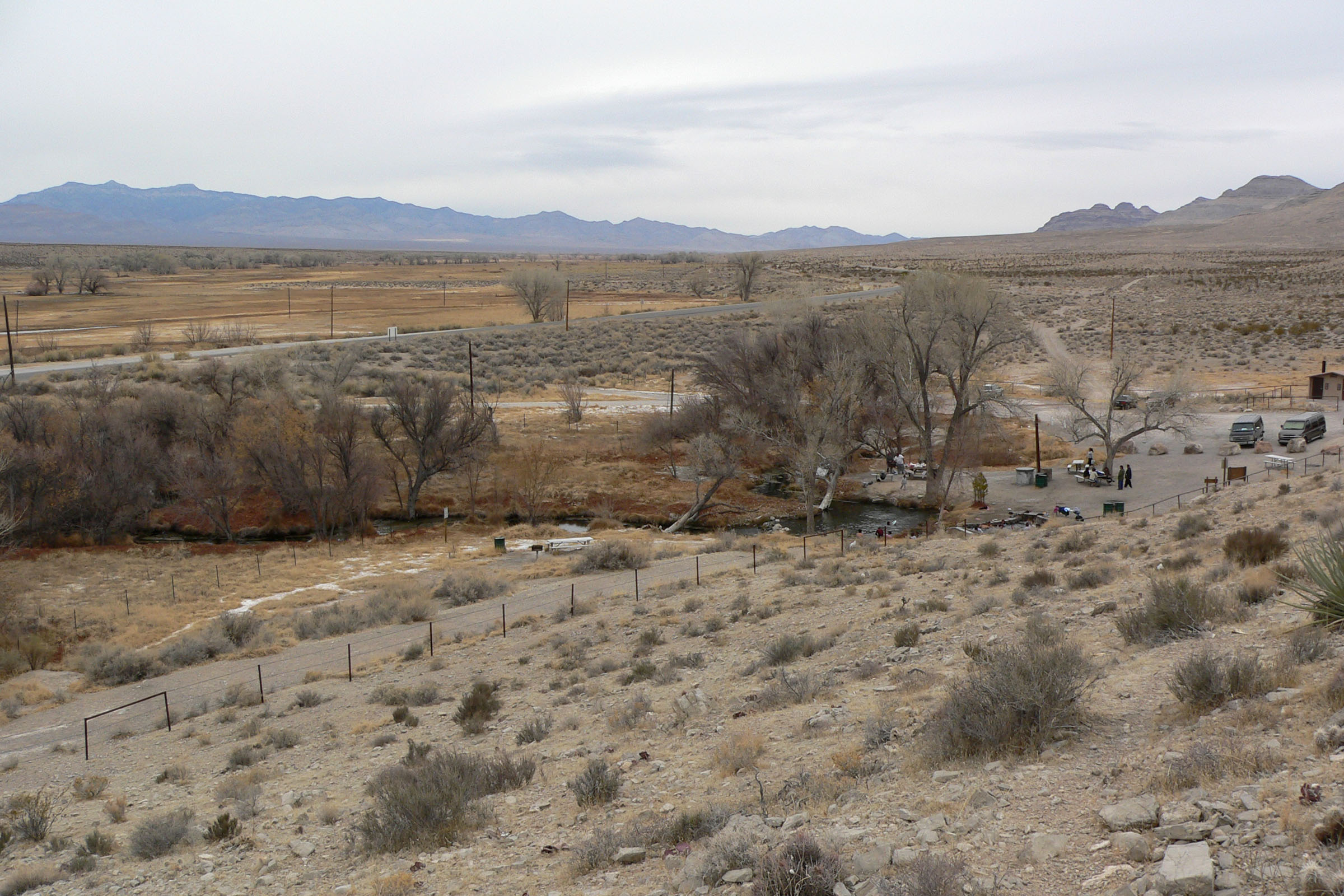

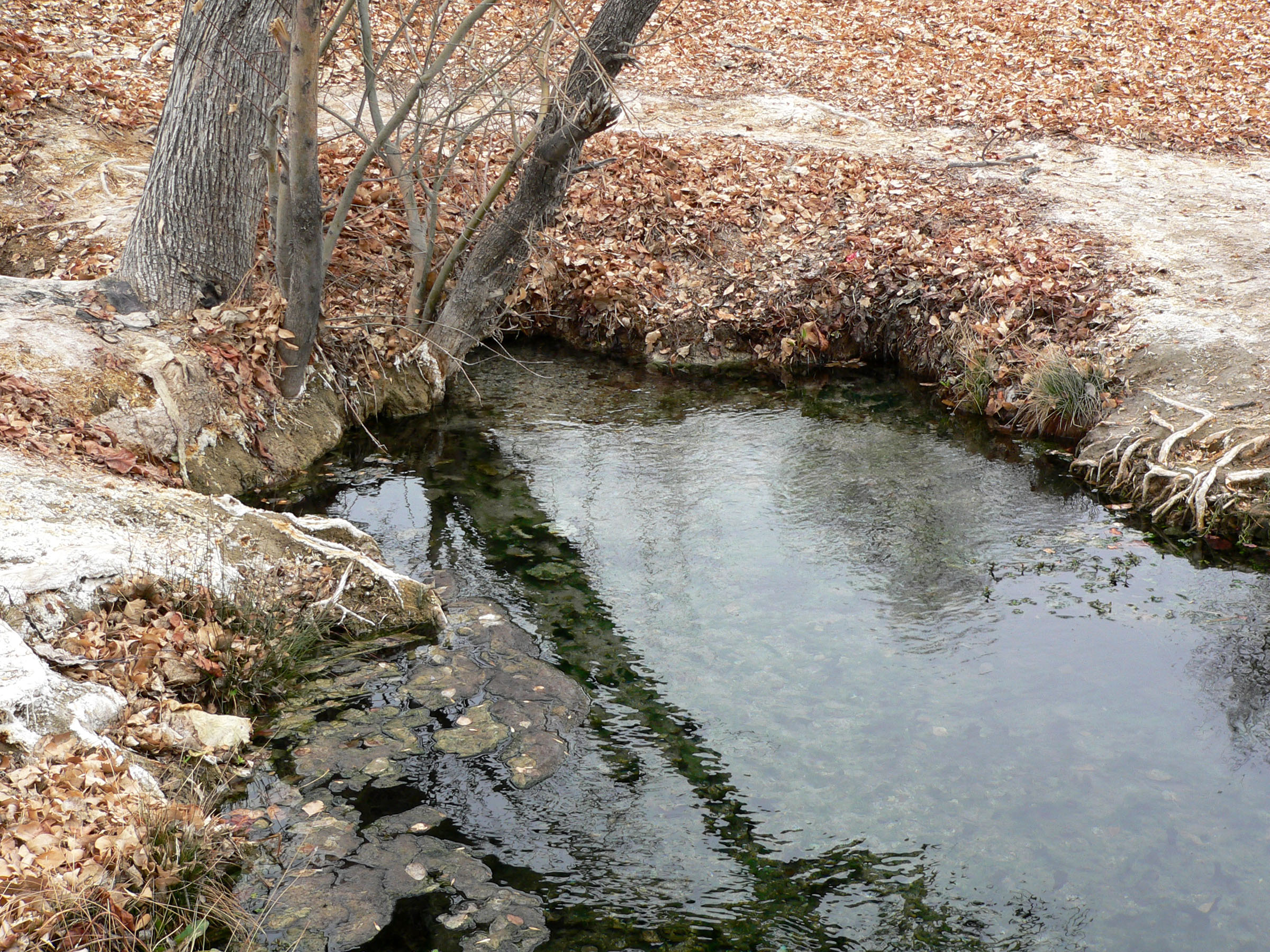
