= Hiko Range =

Mountain range in Nevada, United States

- Hiko range as seen from southbound U.S. Route 93 in 2026.

Highest point
- Elevation: 4,495 ft (1,370 m)
- Coordinates: 37°29′6.859″N 115°9′28.065″W

Geography
- Location within Nevada
- Country: United States
- State: Nevada
- District: Lincoln County
- Topo map: USGS Ash Springs

The Hiko Range is a mountain range in Lincoln County, Nevada.
