= Pahranagat National Wildlife Refuge =

Protected area in Nevada, United States

- IUCN category IV (habitat/species management area)
- Location within the United States
- Location: Lincoln County, Nevada, United States
- Nearest city: Glendale, Nevada
- Coordinates: 37°15′00″N 115°04′45″W
- Area: 5,380 acres (21.8 km^{2})
- Established: 1963
- Governing body: U.S. Fish and Wildlife Service
- Website: Pahranagat National Wildlife Refuge

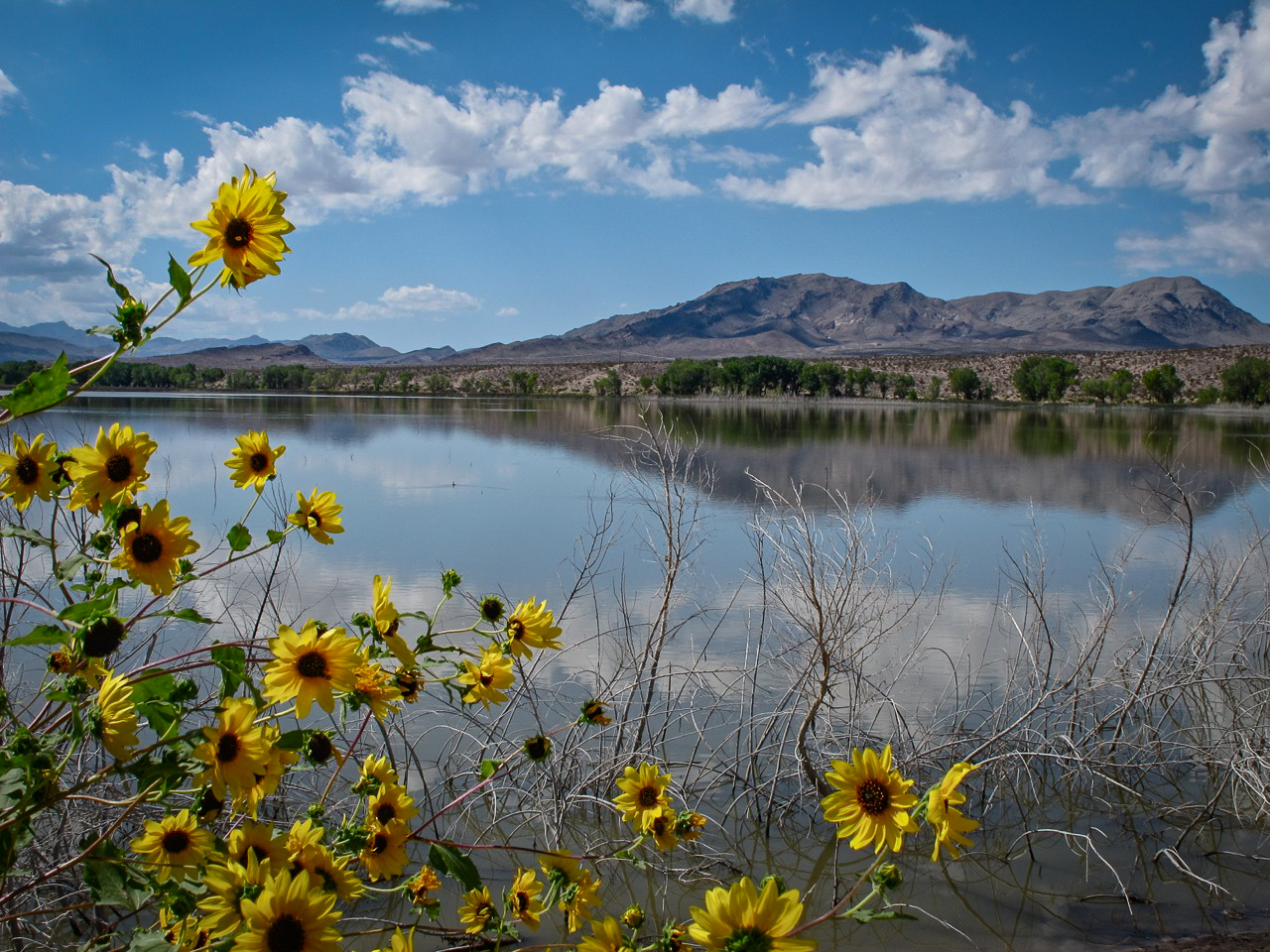
Pahranagat National Wildlife Refuge, Nevada

The Pahranagat National Wildlife Refuge is a protected wildlife refuge, at the southern end of the Pahranagat Valley and administered by the U.S. Fish and Wildlife Service. It is 90 miles (140 km) north of Las Vegas, Nevada, in Lincoln County, Nevada. The 5,380-acre (21.8 km^{2}) refuge was created on August 16, 1963, and is part of the larger Desert National Wildlife Refuge Complex, which also includes the Ash Meadows National Wildlife Refuge, the Desert National Wildlife Refuge, and the Moapa Valley National Wildlife Refuge.

The refuge provides high-quality migration and wintering habitat for migrating birds, especially waterfowl, within the Pacific Flyway. It also contains the prehistoric Black Canyon Petroglyphs.

== History ==
Work is underway to restore wetland and desert upland habitats to what was found on the refuge over 100 years ago.

== Species of concern that spend part of the year at Pahranagat ==
=== Endangered ===
Endangered species include:

- Southwestern willow flycatcher

=== Threatened ===
Threatened species include:

- Desert tortoise
