= Tilapia =

Common name for many species of fish

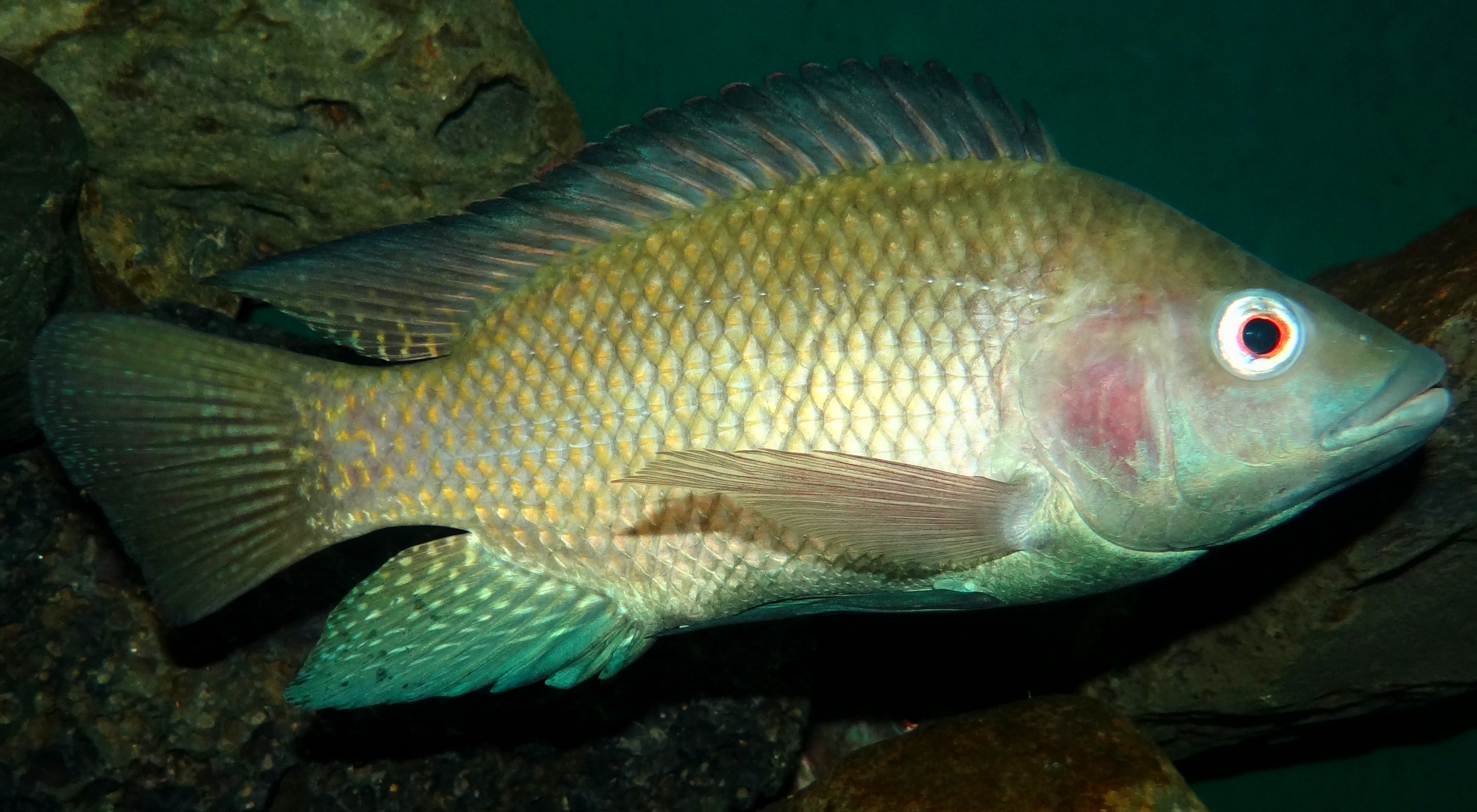
Nile tilapia, Oreochromis niloticus

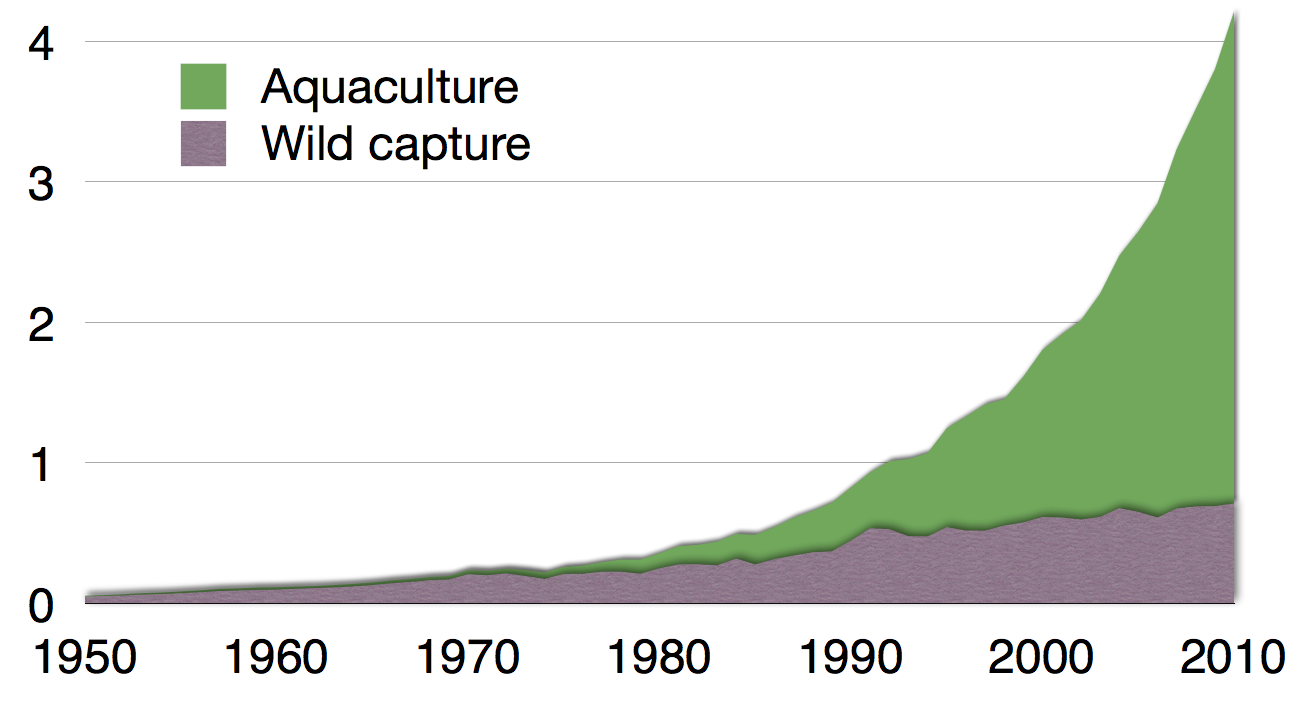
Global harvest of tilapia in million tonnes as reported by the FAO, 1950–2009

Tilapia (/tɪˈlɑːpiə/ tih-LAH-pee-ə) is the common name for nearly a hundred species of cichlid fish from the coelotilapine, coptodonine, heterotilapine, oreochromine, pelmatolapiine, and tilapiine tribes (formerly all were "Tilapiini"), with the economically most important species placed in the Coptodonini and Oreochromini. Tilapia are mainly freshwater fish native to Africa and the Middle East, inhabiting shallow streams, ponds, rivers, and lakes, and less commonly found living in brackish water. Historically, they have been of major importance in artisanal fishing in Africa, and they are of increasing importance in aquaculture and aquaponics. Tilapia can become a problematic invasive species in new warm-water habitats such as Australia, whether deliberately or accidentally introduced, but generally not in temperate climates due to their inability to survive in cold water.

Traditionally a popular and affordable food in the Philippines with a mild taste, tilapia has been the fourth-most consumed fish in the United States since 2002, favored for its low cost and easy preparation. It is commonly fried or broiled as part of a dish.

== Etymology ==
The common name "tilapia" is based on the name of the cichlid genus Tilapia, which is itself a latinization of either tlhapi, the Tswana word for 'fish', or the Greek word tilon, referring to a fish mentioned by Aristotle, combined with apios, meaning 'distant'. Scottish zoologist Andrew Smith named the genus in 1840.

== History ==
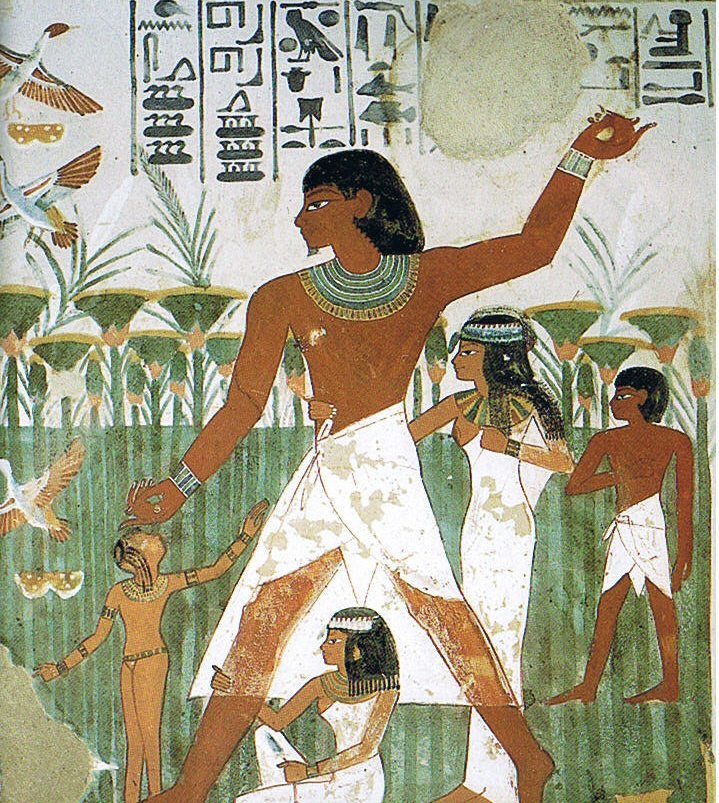
The Tomb of Nakht, from 1500 BC, contains a tilapia hieroglyph just above and to the right of the head of the central tall figure.

The aquaculture of Nile tilapia dates from Ancient Egypt, where it was represented by the hieroglyph K1, of the Gardiner list: 𓆛.

The fish symbolized rebirth in Egyptian art, and was associated in Egyptian belief-systems with Hathor, goddess of fertility and abundance. The tilapia was also said to accompany and protect the sun god on his daily journey across the sky.

Tilapia were one of the three main types of fish caught in Talmudic times from the Sea of Galilee, specifically the Galilean comb (Sarotherodon galilaeus). It is sometimes known by the name "St. Peter's fish", which comes from the narrative in the Gospel of Matthew about the apostle Peter catching a fish that carried a coin in its mouth. Though the passage does not name the fish, several tilapia species are found in the Sea of Galilee, where the narrative recounts the event that took place. These species have been the target of small-scale artisanal fisheries in the area for thousands of years.

== Characteristics ==
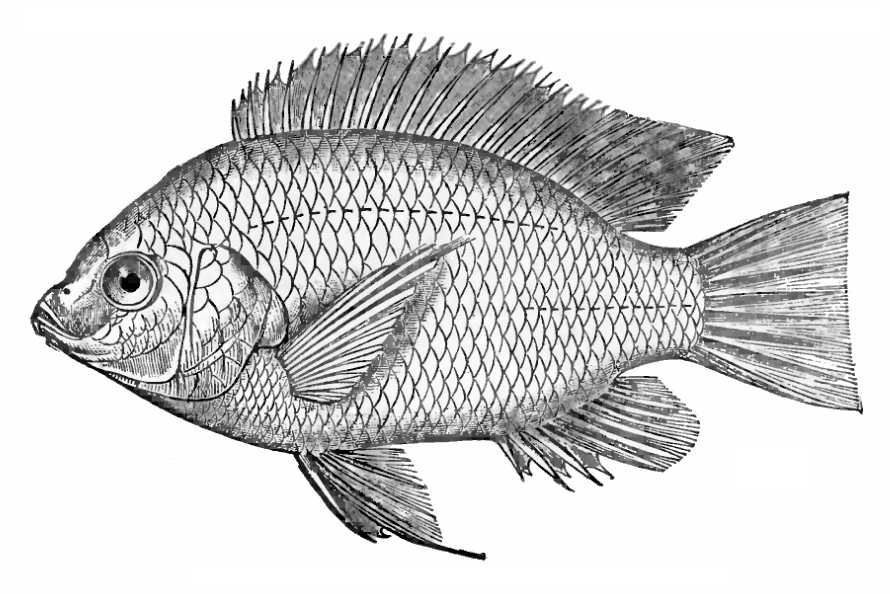
Nile tilapia (Oreochromis niloticus)

Tilapia typically have laterally compressed, deep bodies. Like other cichlids, their lower pharyngeal bones are fused into a single tooth-bearing structure. A complex set of muscles allows the upper and lower pharyngeal bones to be used as a second set of jaws for processing food (cf. morays), allowing a division of labor between the "true jaws" (mandibles) and the "pharyngeal jaws". This means they are efficient feeders that can capture and process a wide variety of food items. Their mouths are protrusible, usually bordered with wide and often swollen lips. The jaws have conical teeth. Typically, tilapia have a long dorsal fin, and a lateral line that often breaks towards the end of the dorsal fin, and starts again two or three rows of scales below. Some Nile tilapia can grow as long as 60 centimetres (2 ft).

Other than their temperature sensitivity, tilapia exist in or can adapt to a very wide range of conditions. An extreme example is the Salton Sea, where tilapia introduced when the water was merely brackish now live in salt concentrations so high that other marine fish cannot survive.

Tilapia are also known to be mouth-brooding species, which means they carry the fertilized eggs and young fish in their mouths for several days after the yolk sac is absorbed.

== Species ==
Historically, all tilapia have been included in their namesake genus Tilapia. In recent decades, some were moved into a few other genera, notably Oreochromis, and Sarotherodon. Even with this modification, apparently Tilapia was strongly poly– or paraphyletic. In 2013, a major taxonomic review resolved this by moving most former Tilapia spp. to several other genera. As a consequence, none of the species that are of major economic importance remain in Tilapia, but are instead placed in Coptodon, Oreochormis, and Sarotherodon.

=== Exotic and invasive species ===
Tilapia have been used as biological controls for certain aquatic plant problems. They have a preference for a floating aquatic plant, duckweed (Lemna spp.), but also consume some filamentous algae. In Kenya, tilapia were introduced to control mosquitoes, which were causing malaria, because they consume mosquito larvae, consequently reducing the numbers of adult female mosquitoes, the vector of the disease. These benefits are, however, frequently outweighed by the negative aspects of tilapia as an invasive species.

Tilapia are unable to survive in temperate climates because they require warm water. The pure strain of the blue tilapia, Oreochromis aureus, has the greatest cold tolerance and dies at 7 °C (45 °F), while all other species of tilapia die at a range of 11 to 17 °C (52 to 62 °F). As a result, they cannot invade temperate habitats and disrupt native ecologies in temperate zones; however, they have spread widely beyond their points of introduction in many fresh and brackish tropical and subtropical habitats, often disrupting native species significantly. Because of this, tilapia are on the IUCN's 100 of the World's Worst Alien Invasive Species list. In the United States, tilapia are found in much of the south, especially Florida and Texas, and as far north as Idaho, where they survive in power-plant discharge zones. Tilapia are also currently stocked in the Phoenix, Arizona, canal system as an algal growth-control measure. In a Washington, D.C. fishing report from 21 June 2024, it was reported that an angler caught a tilapia on a crankbait at the Jones Point Park under the Woodrow Wilson Bridge, which is on the Potomac River. Many state fish and wildlife agencies in the United States, Australia, South Africa, and elsewhere consider them to be invasive species.

=== Aquarium species ===
Larger tilapia species are generally poor community aquarium fish because they eat plants, dig up the bottom, and fight with other fish. The larger species are often raised as a food source, though, because they grow rapidly and tolerate high stocking densities and poor water quality.

Smaller West African species, such as Coelotilapia joka and species from the crater lakes of Cameroon, are more popular as aquarium fish. In specialised cichlid aquaria, tilapia can be mixed successfully with nonterritorial cichlids, armored catfish, tinfoil barbs, garpike, and other robust fish. Some species, including Heterotilapia buttikoferi, Coptodon rendalli, Pelmatolapia mariae, C. joka, and the brackish-water Sarotherodon melanotheron, have attractive patterns and are quite decorative.

=== Commercial species ===
Tilapia were originally farmed in their native Africa and Levant. Fast-growing, tolerant of stocking density, and adaptable, tilapia have been introduced to and are farmed extensively in many parts of Asia and are increasingly common aquaculture targets elsewhere.

Principal commercial tilapia species
Common name	Scientific name	max. length	Common length	max. weight	max. age	Trophic level	Fish Base	FAO	WoRMS	IUCN status
Nile tilapia	Oreochromis niloticus (Linnaeus, 1758)	60 cm	cm	4.324 kg	9 years	2.0				Least Concern
Blue tilapia	Oreochromis aureus (Steindachner, 1864)	45.7 cm	16 cm	2.010 kg	years	2.1				Least Concern
Nile tilapia + blue tilapia hybrid		cm	cm	kg	years					
Mozambique tilapia	Oreochromis mossambicus (Peters, 1852)	39 cm	35 cm	1.130 kg	11 years	2.0				Vulnerable

==== Aquaculture ====
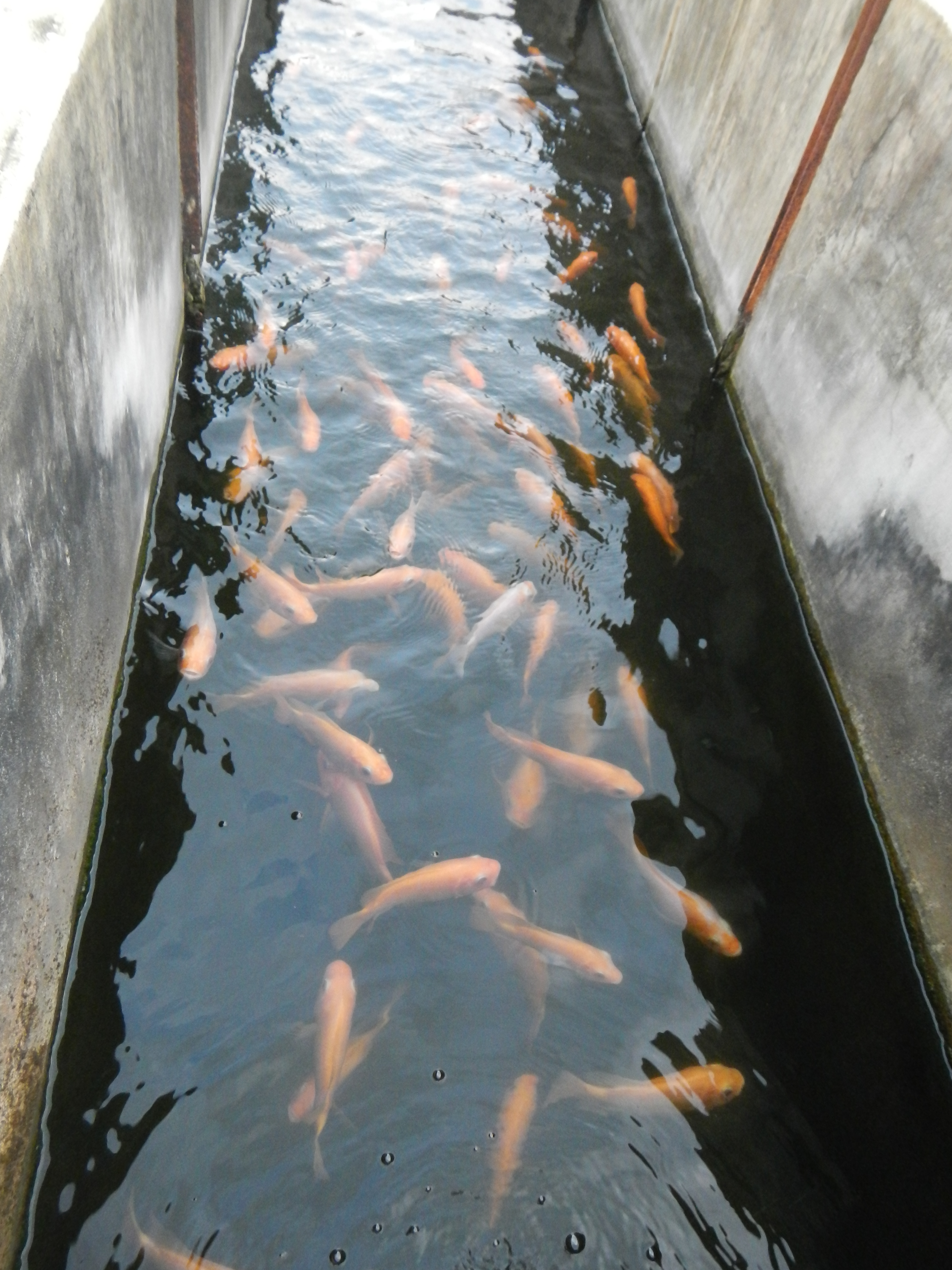
Red nile tilapia under experimentation in CLSU, Philippines

Global harvest of tilapia species in million tonnes as reported by the FAO, 1950–2009

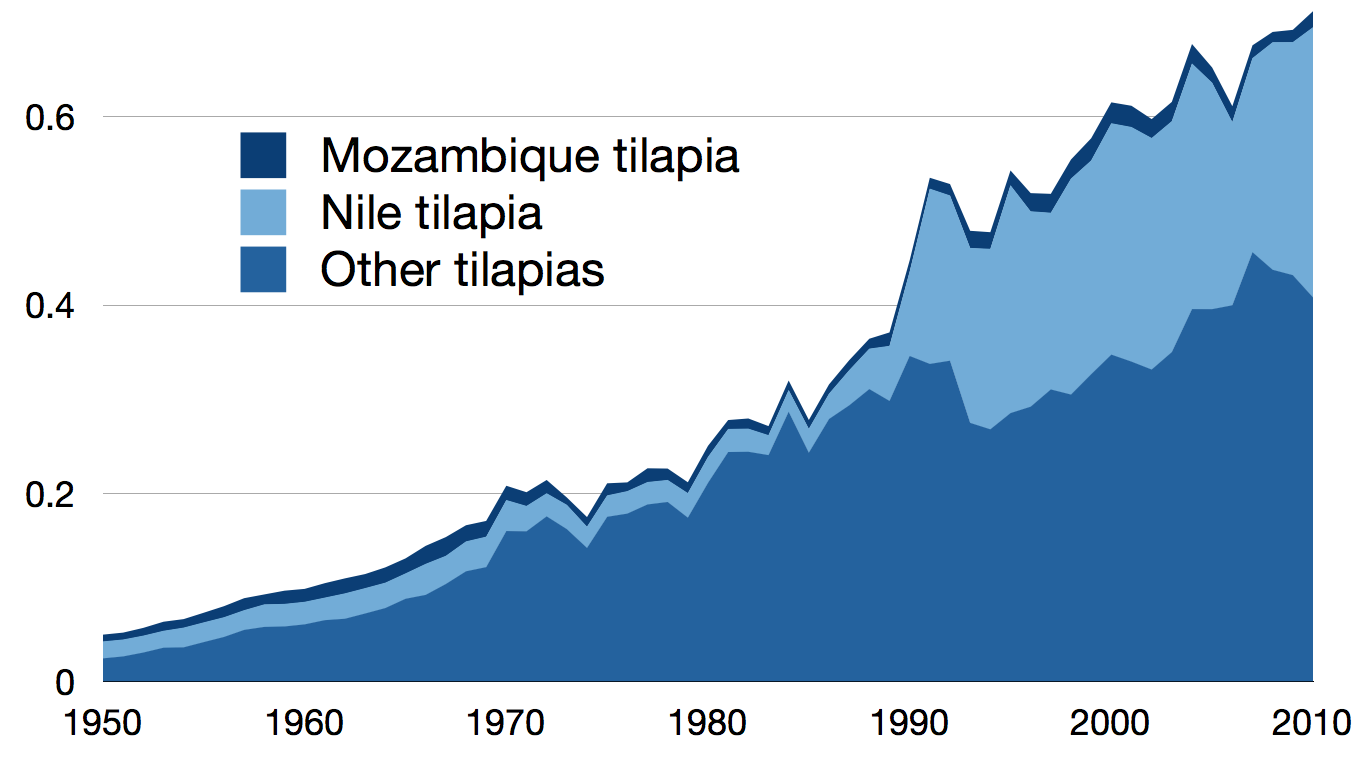
↑ Wild capture

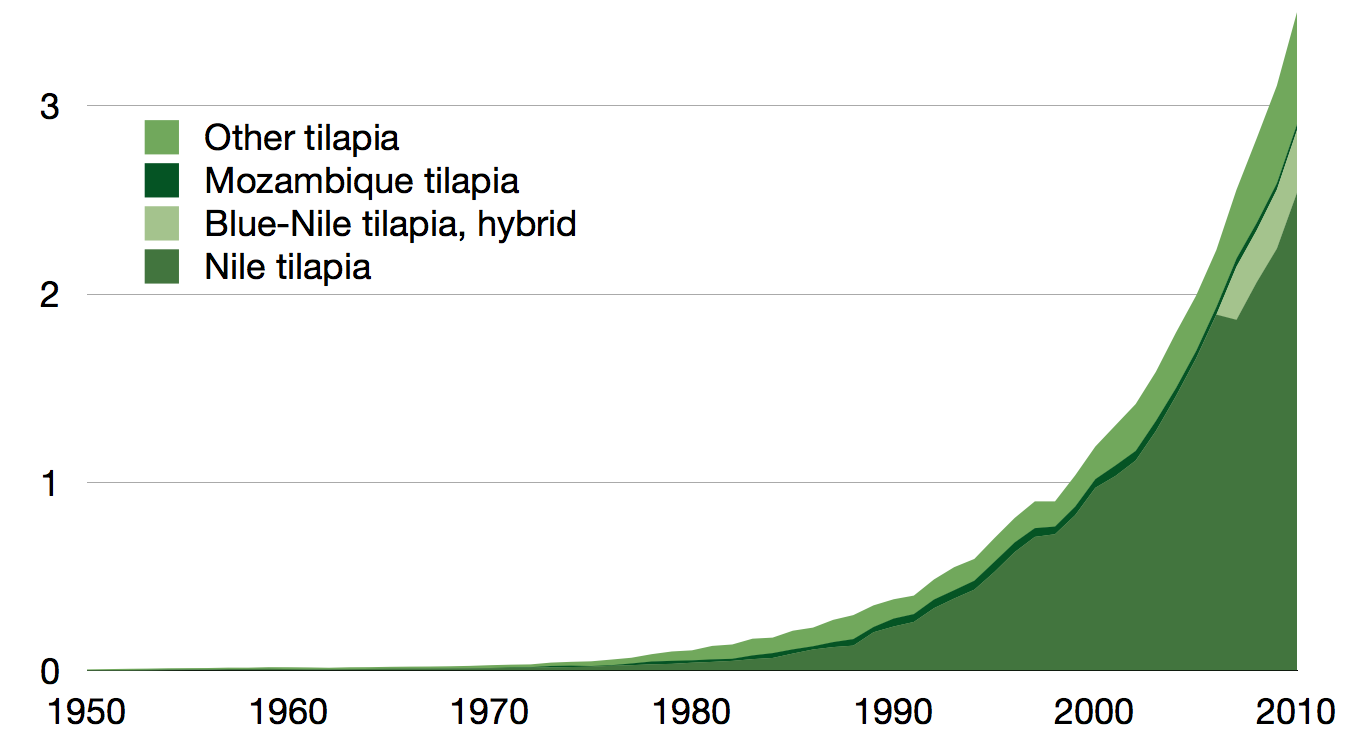
↑ Aquaculture production

Farmed tilapia production in 2002 worldwide was about 1.5 million tonnes (1.7 million short tons) annually, with an estimated value of US$1.8 billion, about equal to those of salmon and trout.

Unlike carnivorous fish, tilapia can feed on algae or any plant-based food. This reduces the cost of tilapia farming, reduces fishing pressure on prey species, avoids concentrating toxins that accumulate at higher levels of the food chain, and makes tilapia the preferred "aquatic chickens" of the trade.

Because of their large size, rapid growth, and palatability, tilapia cichlids are the focus of major farming efforts, specifically various species of Oreochromis, Sarotherodon, and Coptodon (all were formerly in the namesake genus Tilapia). Like other large fish, they are a good source of protein and popular among artisanal and commercial fisheries. Most such fisheries were originally found in Africa, but outdoor fish farms in tropical countries, such as Papua New Guinea, the Philippines, and Indonesia, are underway in freshwater lakes. In temperate zone localities, tilapiine farming operations require energy to warm the water to tropical temperatures. One method uses waste heat from factories and power stations.

At 1.3 million tonnes per annum, China is the largest tilapia producer in the world, followed by Egypt with 0.5 million. The US, by comparison, produces 10 thousand tonnes against a consumption of 2.5 million.

In modern aquaculture, wild-type Nile tilapia are not too often seen, as the dark color of their flesh is not much desired by many customers, and because it has a bit of a reputation of being a rough fish associated with poverty. However, they are fast-growing and give good fillets; leucistic ("red") breeds which have lighter meat have been developed and are very popular.

Hybrid stock is also used in aquaculture; Nile × blue tilapia hybrids are usually rather dark, but a light-colored hybrid breed known as "Rocky Mountain White" tilapia is often grown due to its very light flesh and tolerance of low temperatures.

Commercially grown tilapia are almost exclusively male, typically done by adding male sex hormone in the food to the tilapia fry, causing any potential female tilapia to change sex to male. It can also be achieved through hybridization of certain tilapia species or the use of so-called "supermales" that have homozygous male sex chromosomes (resulting in all their offspring receiving a male sex chromosome and thus becoming males). Males are preferred because they grow much faster than females. Additionally, because tilapia are prolific breeders, the presence of female tilapia results in rapidly increasing populations of small fish, rather than a stable population of harvest-size animals.

Tilapia, as a "traditional" dish, was first introduced in the Philippines in 1950 with Mozambique tilapia followed by Nile tilapia in 1972 from Thailand. Strains such as terapon (gunggong) and white goby (biyang puti) were abundant in Laguna de Bay. In 1988, WorldFish, Filipino and Norwegian researchers started aquaculture of the Genetically Improved Farmed Tilapia (GIFT).

Other methods of tilapia population control are polyculture, with predators farmed alongside tilapia or hybridization with other species.

== As food ==
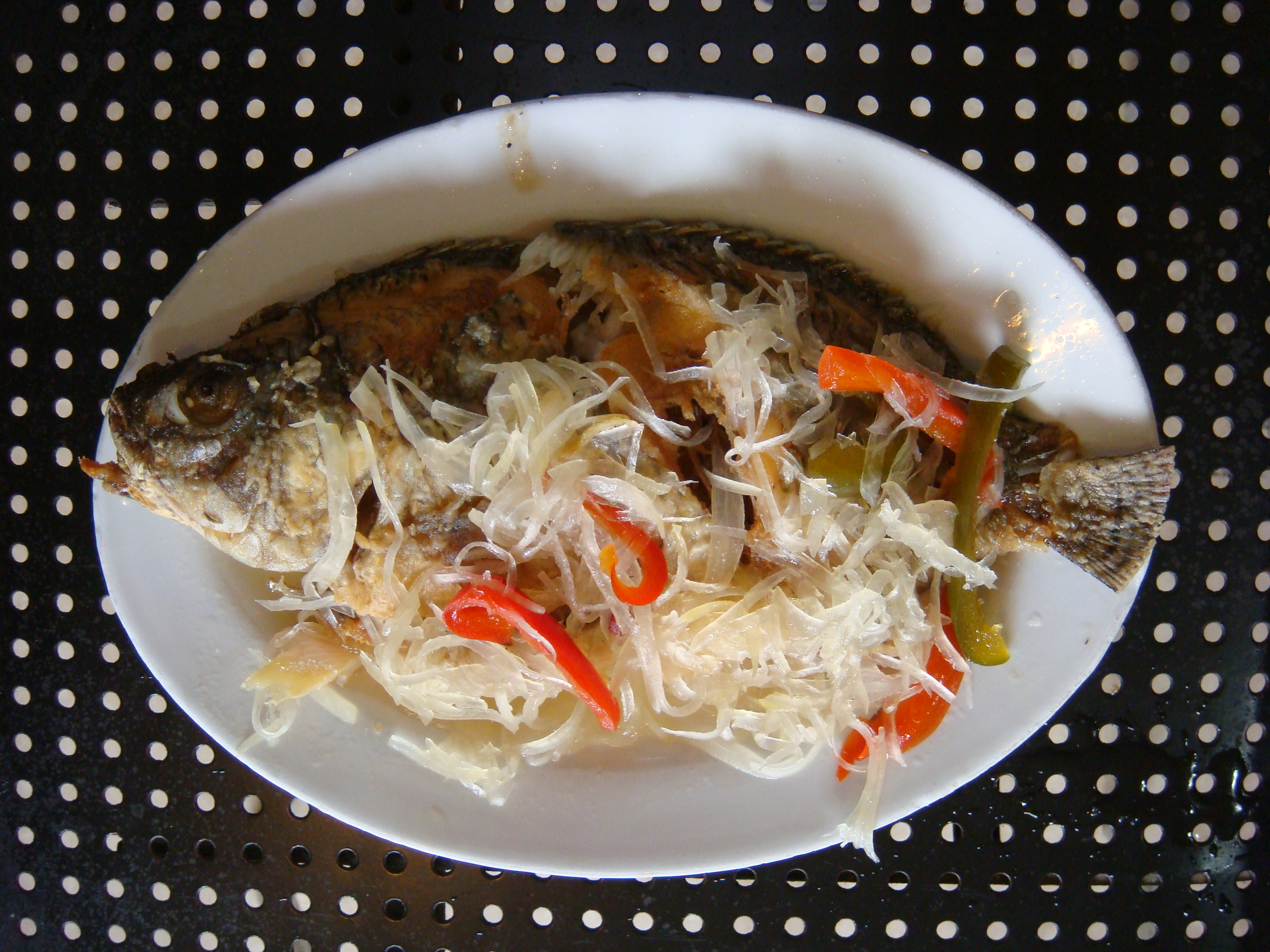
Escabeche of tilapia

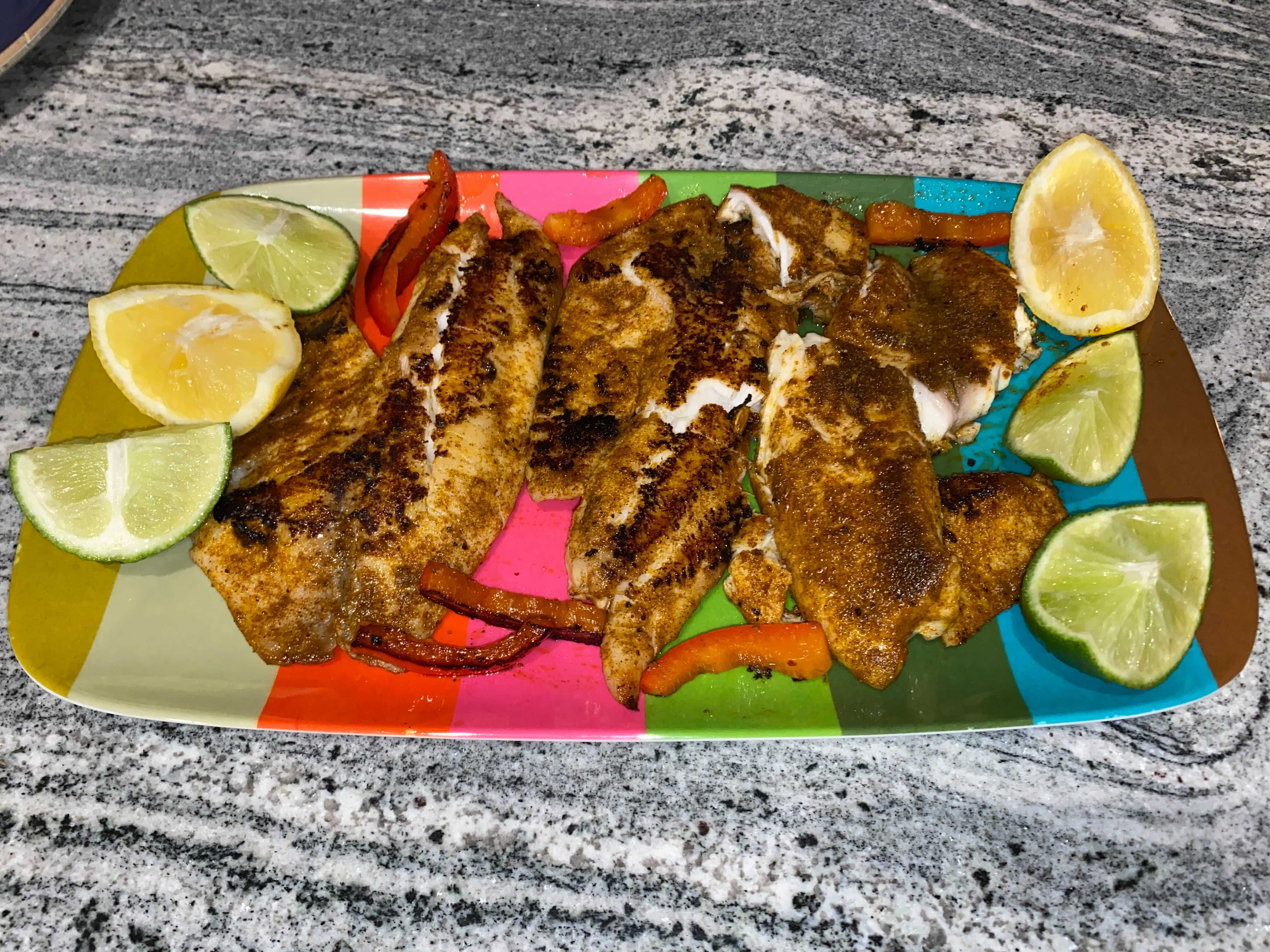
Blackened tilapia filets seasoned with Cajun spices, lemon & lime juice

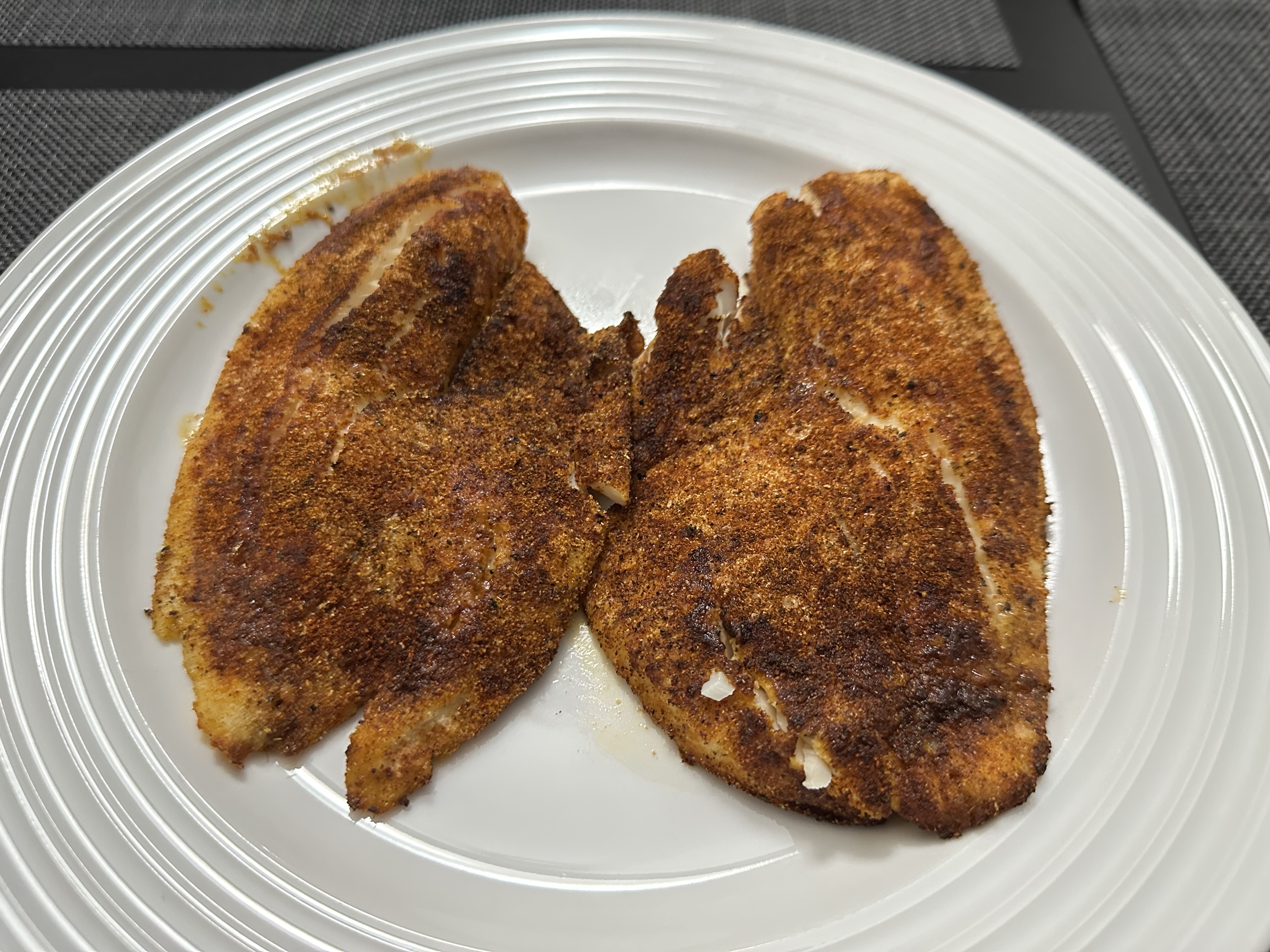
A plate of air-fried tilapia

From ancient times, the tilapia has been a source of food. Art items dating from the late 18th Dynasty, circa 1350 BCE, contain evidence of the importance of tilapia in Egypt. The Nile tilapia (Oreochromis niloticus) is endemic to the area and was grown in closed ponds along the Nile River.

Tilapia, introduced to the state of Tamil Nadu, India, in the 1950s as a cheap protein source, quickly spread across the state's freshwater bodies because of its ability to thrive in polluted, low-oxygen environments.

The Fisheries Research Committee has recommended the culture of this fish only in areas in the western slopes of the Western Ghats and the coastal strip between Cape Comorin and south of, and excluding river Tapti, and in districts of Tinnevelly, Madurai and Ramnad in Madras south of and including river Vaigai. The committee has suggested further investigation to enable it to examine the question of the desirability of Tilapia culture in other parts of India.

Whole tilapia fish can be processed into skinless, boneless fillets. In some of the commercial strains, the yield has been reported up to 47% at harvest weight.

Tilapia are among the commercially important aquaculture species that are susceptible to off-flavors (others include trout, barramundi, and channel catfish). These 'muddy' or 'musty' flavors are normally caused by geosmin and 2-methylisoborneol, organic products of ubiquitous cyanobacteria that are often present or bloom sporadically in water bodies and soil. These flavors are no indication of the freshness or safety of the fish, but they make the product unattractive to consumers. Simple quality-control procedures are known to be effective in ensuring the quality of fish entering the market.

Taiwan has been a significant producer and exporter of farmed tilapia. In 2023, Taiwan produced approximately 57,000 metric tons of farmed tilapia, representing about one-third of its total finfish aquaculture output, with the United States as its largest export market. Tilapia was first introduced to Taiwan in 1946, and after decades of hybridization and selective breeding the local strain was officially designated "Taiwan tilapia" in 2002. Taiwan tilapia strains have been the subject of cold-tolerance breeding programs, because tilapia are tropical fish sensitive to the relatively cool winters of subtropical Taiwan.

Tilapia have very low levels of mercury. Tilapia are low in saturated fat, calories, carbohydrates, and sodium, and are a good protein source. They also contain the micronutrients phosphorus, niacin, selenium, vitamin B_{12}, and potassium.

Tilapia may be a less nutritious fish than generally believed. The fish's omega-3 fatty acid content is often far lower than that of other commonly eaten fish species. Their omega-6 fatty acid levels are unusually high. Multiple studies have evaluated the effects of adding flaxseed derivatives (a vegetable source of omega-3 fatty acids) to the feed of farmed tilapia. These studies have found that both the more common omega-3 fatty acid found in flax, ALA and the two types almost unique to animal sources (DHA and EPA), increased in the fish fed this diet. Guided by these findings, tilapia farming techniques could be adjusted to address the nutritional criticisms directed at the fish, while retaining its advantage as an omnivore capable of feeding on economically and environmentally inexpensive vegetable protein. Adequate diets for salmon and other carnivorous fish can alternatively be formulated from protein sources such as soybean, although soy-based diets with soy oil may also change the balance between omega-6 and omega-3 fatty acids.

== Ecological agent ==
Tilapia serves as a natural, biological control for most aquatic plant problems. They consume floating aquatic plants, such as duckweed watermeal (Lemna spp.), most "undesirable" submerged plants, and most forms of algae. In the United States and countries such as Thailand, they are becoming the plant-control method of choice, reducing or eliminating the use of toxic chemicals and heavy metal-based algaecides. However, their environmental impact as an invasive species may outweigh their ecological benefit. Their tolerance for a wide range of environmental conditions allows them to thrive in polluted or otherwise degraded aquatic habitats. Arkansas stocks many public ponds and lakes to help with vegetation control. In Kenya, tilapia help control mosquitoes, which carry malaria parasites.

Tilapia can be farmed with shrimp in a symbiotic manner, positively enhancing the productive output of both.

== Medical use ==
In Brazil, Nile tilapia (Oreochromis niloticus) fish skin applied as a bandage was first used in a 2017 clinical trial to treat burn injuries, after successful trial in rats. In the United States, tilapia skin has been used to successfully treat third-degree wounds to the paws of two black bears caught in California's Thomas wildfire, and also to treat burns on the paws of a black bear from California's Carr wildfire. Nile tilapia skin has completed a phase III clinical trial for superficial partial-thickness burns. The fish skin group showed faster healing, lower pain, reduced dressing changes, and lower treatment costs compared to silver sulfadiazine cream control.

Nile tilapia skin has also been used in neovaginoplasty as a skin graft material, for Müllerian agenesis, vaginal stenosis, and gender-affirming surgery.

The skin-growing properties of tilapia skin are believed to be linked to its high type I collagen content and structural similarities to human skin. The material is also quite strong despite its low thickness. The current procedure for skin use calls for chemical sterilization with chlorhexidine, immersion in glycerol, followed by gamma ray sterilization, plus a few washes with saline in between.

== Parasites ==
As with most fish, tilapia harbor a variety of parasites. For the monogeneans, these especially include species of the megadiverse genus Cichlidogyrus, which are gill parasites. Species of Enterogyrus are parasites in the digestive system. Tilapia, as an important aquaculture fish, has been introduced widely all over the world, and often carries their monogenean parasites with them. In South China, a 2019 study has shown that nine species of monogeneans were carried by introduced tilapia.
