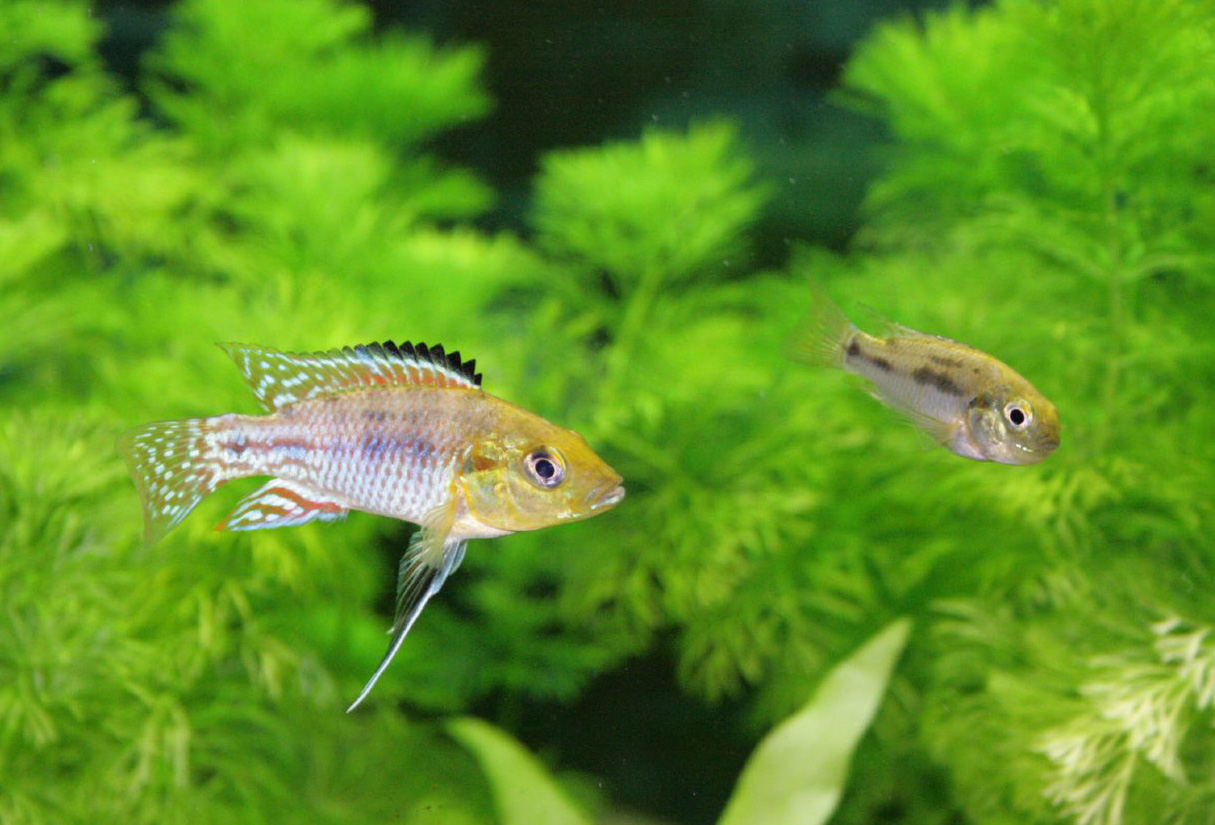
- Pseudocrenilabrus multicolor

Scientific classification
- Kingdom: Animalia
- Phylum: Chordata
- Class: Actinopterygii
- Division: Teleostei
- Order: Cichliformes
- Family: Cichlidae
- Subfamily: Pseudocrenilabrinae; Fowler, 1934

Tribes
- Chromidotilapiini; Cyprichromini; Ectodini; Haplochromini; Hemichromini; Lamprologini; Limnochromini; Tilapiini; Tropheini; Tylochromini and see text

= Pseudocrenilabrinae =

Subfamily of fishes

The Pseudocrenilabrinae are a subfamily in the cichlid family of fishes to which, according to a study from 2004, includes all the Middle Eastern and African cichlids with the exception of the unusual Heterochromis multidens and the Malagasy species. This subfamily includes more than 1,100 species. Previous authors recognized additional African subfamilies, e.g. the Tilapiinae of Hoedeman (1947), Tylochrominae of Poll (1986), or Boulengerochrominae of Tawil (2001).

This subfamily includes the cichlids from the African Great Lakes, such as the utaka and mbuna in Lake Malawi, and various species from Lake Victoria and Lake Tanganyika.

The Pseudocrenilabrinae tribes Haplochromini and Oreochromini are widespread in Africa and also found in the Middle East, while Chromidotilapiini, Hemichromini and Tylochromini are primarily West and Central African. The remaining tribes are largely or entirely restricted to Lake Tanganyika.

== Systematics ==
Apart from the tribes mentioned in the adjacent box, Bathybatini, Benthochromini, Boulengerochromini, Coelotilapiini, Coptodonini, Cyphotilapiini, Eretmodini, Etiini, Greenwoodochromini, Heterotilapiini, Limnochromini, Oreochromini, Pelmatolapiini, Perissodini, Steatocranini and Trematocarini are sometimes also recognized. The extinct genus Mahengechromis is purportedly distinct from any of the established Pseudocrenilabrinae tribes.

=== Genera ===
The subfamily Pseudocrenilabrinae has been arranged as follows by some authorities

- Bathybatini
  - Bathybates Boulenger, 1898
  - Hemibates Regan, 1920
  - Trematocara Boulenger, 1899
- Benthochromini
  - Benthochromis Poll, 1986
- Boulengerochromini
  - Boulengerochromis Pellegrin, 1904
- Chromidotilapiini
  - Benitochromis Lamboj 2001
  - Chromidotilapia Boulenger 1898
  - Congochromis Stiassny & Schliewen, 2007
  - Divandu Lamboj & Snoeks, 2000
  - Limbochromis Greenwood, 1987
  - Nanochromis Pellegrin, 1904
  - Parananochromis Greenwood, 1987
  - Pelvicachromis Thys van den Audenaerde, 1968
  - Teleogramma Boulenger, 1899
  - Thysochromis Daget, 1988
  - Wallaceochromis Lamboj, Trummer & Metscher, 2016
- Coelotilapiini
  - Coelotilapia Mayland, 1995
- Coptodonini
  - Coptodon Gervais, 1848
- Cyphotilapiini
  - Cyphotilapia Regan, 1920
- Cyprichromini
  - Cyprichromis Scheuermann, 1977
  - Paracyprichromis Poll, 1986
- Ectodini
  - Aulonocranus Regan, 1920
  - Callochromis Regan, 1920
  - Cardiopharynx Poll, 1942
  - Cunningtonia Boulenger, 1906
  - Cyathopharynx Regan, 1920
  - Ectodus Boulenger, 1898
  - Grammatotria Boulenger, 1899
  - Lestradea Poll, 1943
  - Ophthalmotilapia Pellegrin, 1904
  - Xenochromis Boulenger, 1899
  - Xenotilapia Boulenger, 1899
- Eretmodini
  - Eretmodus Boulenger, 1898
  - Spathodus Boulenger, 1900
  - Tanganicodus Poll, 1950
- Etiini
  - Etia Schliewen & Stiassny, 2003
- Gobiocichlini
  - Gobiocichla Kanazawa, 1951
- Greenwoodochromini
  - Greenwoodochromis Poll, 1983
- Haplochromini
  - Abactochromis Oliver & Arnegard 2010
  - Alticorpus Stauffer & McKaye, 1988
  - Aristochromis Trewavas, 1935
  - Astatoreochromis Pellegrin, 1904
  - Astatotilapia Pellegrin, 1904
  - Aulonocara Regan, 1922
  - Buccochromis Eccles & Trewavas, 1989
  - Caprichromis Eccles, & Trewavas 1989
  - Champsochromis Boulenger, 1915
  - Cheilochromis Eccles & Trewavas 1989
  - Chetia Trewavas, 1961
  - Chilotilapia Boulenger, 1908
  - Copadichromis Eccles & Trewavas, 1989
  - Corematodus Boulenger, 1897
  - Ctenochromis Pfeffer, 1893
  - Ctenopharynx Eccles & Trewavas, 1989
  - Cyathochromis Trewavas, 1935
  - Cyclopharynx Poll, 1948
  - Cynotilapia Regan, 1922
  - Cyrtocara Boulenger, 1902
  - Dimidiochromis Eccles & Trewavas, 1989
  - Diplotaxodon Trewavas, 1935
  - Docimodus Boulenger, 1897
  - Eclectochromis Eccles & Trewavas, 1989
  - Exochochromis Eccles & Trewavas, 1989
  - Fossorochromis Eccles & Trewavas, 1989
  - Genyochromis Trewavas, 1935
  - Gephyrochromis Boulenger, 1901
  - Haplochromis Hilgendorf, 1888
  - Hemitaeniochromis Eccles & Trewavas, 1989
  - Hemitilapia Boulenger, 1902
  - Iodotropheus Oliver & Loiselle, 1972
  - Labeotropheus Ahl, 1926
  - Labidochromis Trewavas, 1935
  - Lethrinops Regan, 1922
  - Lichnochromis Trewavas, 1935
  - Lithochromis Lippitsch & Seehausen, 1998
  - Maylandia M. K. Meyer & W. Förster, 1984
  - Mbipia Lippitsch & Seehausen, 1998
  - Mchenga Stauffer & Konings, 2006
  - Melanochromis Trewavas, 1935
  - Mylochromis Regan, 1920
  - Naevochromis Eccles & Trewavas, 1989
  - Nimbochromis Eccles & Trewavas, 1989
  - Nyassachromis Eccles & Trewavas, 1989
  - Orthochromis Greenwood, 1954
  - Otopharynx Regan, 1920
  - Pallidochromis Turner, 1994
  - Petrotilapia Trewavas, 1935
  - Pharyngochromis Greenwood, 1979
  - Placidochromis Eccles & Trewavas, 1989
  - Protomelas Eccles & Trewavas, 1989
  - Pseudocrenilabrus Fowler, 1934
  - Pseudotropheus Regan, 1922
  - Pundamilia Seehausen & Lippitsch, 1998
  - Rhamphochromis Regan, 1922
  - Sargochromis Regan, 1920
  - Schwetzochromis Poll, 1948
  - Sciaenochromis Eccles & Trewavas, 1989
  - Serranochromis Regan, 1920
  - Stigmatochromis Eccles & Trewavas, 1989
  - Taeniochromis Eccles & Trewavas, 1989
  - Taeniolethrinops Eccles & Trewavas, 1989
  - Thoracochromis Greenwood, 1979
  - Tramitichromis Eccles & Trewavas 1989
  - Trematocranus Trewavas 1935
  - Trematochromis Poll, 1987
  - Tropheops Trewavas, 1984
  - Tyrannochromis Eccles & Trewavas, 1989
- Hemichromini
  - Anomalochromis Greenwood, 1985
  - Hemichromis Peters, 1857
  - Rubricatochromis Lamboj & Koblmüller, 2022
- Heterotilapiini
  - Heterotilapia Regan, 1920
- Lamprologini
  - Altolamprologus Poll, 1986
  - Chalinochromis Poll, 1974 (might belong in Julidochromis)
  - Julidochromis Boulenger, 1898
  - Lamprologus Schilthuis, 1891
  - Lepidiolamprologus Pellegrin, 1904 (probably polyphyletic)
  - Neolamprologus Colombé & Allgayer, 1985 (polyphyletic?)
  - Telmatochromis Boulenger, 1898 (probably polyphyletic)
  - Variabilichromis Colombe & Allgayer, 1985
- Limnochromini
  - Baileychromis Poll, 1986
  - Gnathochromis Poll, 1981
  - Limnochromis Regan, 1920
  - Reganochromis Whitley, 1929
  - Tangachromis Poll, 1981
  - Triglachromis Poll & Thys van den Audenaerde, 1974
- Oreochromini
  - Alcolapia Thys van den Audenaerde, 1969
  - Danakilia Thys van den Audenaerde, 1969
  - Iranocichla Coad, 1982
  - Konia Trewavas, 1972
  - Myaka Trewavas, 1972
  - Oreochromis Günther, 1889
  - Pungu Trewavas, 1972
  - Sarotherodon Rüppell, 1852
  - Stomatepia Trewavas, 1962
  - Tristramella Trewavas, 1942
- Pelmatochromini
  - Pelmatochromis Steindachner, 1894
- Pelmatolapiini
  - Pelmatolapia Thys van den Audenaerde, 1969
- Perissodini
  - Haplotaxodon Boulenger, 1906
  - Perissodus Boulenger, 1898
  - Plecodus Boulenger, 1898
- Steatocranini
  - Steatocranus Boulenger 1899
- Tilapiini
  - Chilochromis Boulenger 1902
  - Congolapia Dunz, Vreven & Schliewen, 2012
  - Pterochromis Trewavas, 1973
  - Tilapia Smith, 1840
- Tropheini
  - Interochromis Yamaoka, M. Hori & Kuwamura, 1988
  - Jabarichromis Haefeli, Schedel, Ronco, Indermaur & Salzburger, 2024
  - Limnotilapia Regan, 1920
  - Lobochilotes Boulenger, 1915
  - Petrochromis Boulenger, 1898
  - Pseudosimochromis Nelissen, 1977
  - Shuja Genner, Ngatunga & Turner, 2022
  - Simochromis Boulenger, 1898
  - Tropheus Boulenger, 1898
- Tylochromini
  - Tylochromis Regan, 1920
