= Lithochromis =

Scientific classification
- Kingdom: Animalia
- Phylum: Chordata
- Class: Actinopterygii
- Order: Cichliformes
- Family: Cichlidae
- Subfamily: Pseudocrenilabrinae
- Genus: Lithochromis; Lippitsch & Seehausen in Seehausen et al., 1998

Type species
- Lithochromis rubripinnis Seehausen, Lippitsch & Bouton, 1998

Genus of fishes

Lithochromis is a genus of fish in the Cichlidae family. This genus was formerly included within Haplochromis. It was recognized again upon a comprehensive review of that genus.

It contains the following species:

- Lithochromis rubripinnis Seehausen, Lippitsch & Bouton, 1998
- Lithochromis rufus Seehausen & Lippitsch, 1998
- Lithochromis xanthopteryx Seehausen & Bouton, 1998
