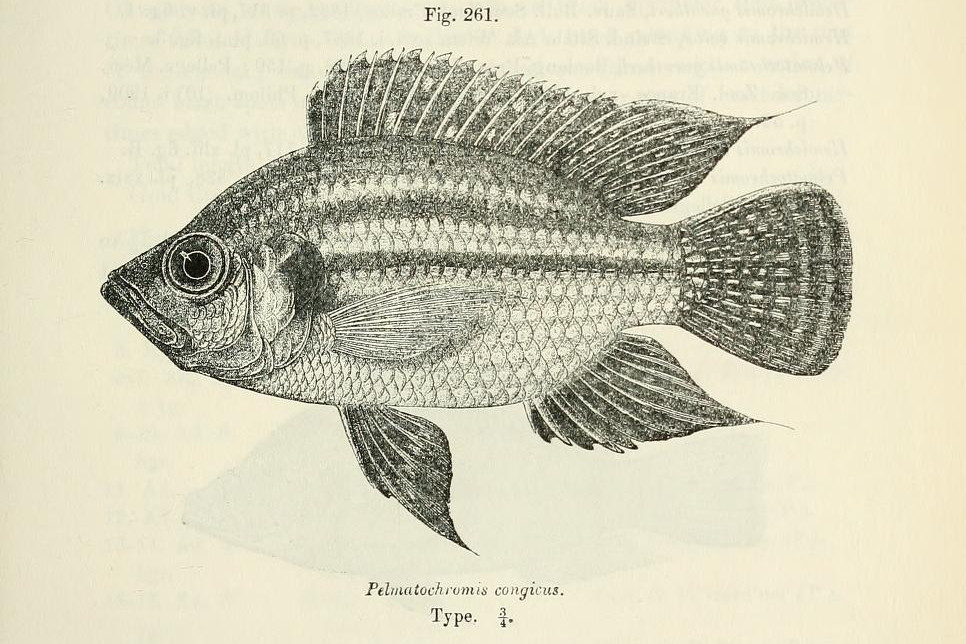

Conservation status
- Least Concern (IUCN 3.1)

Scientific classification
- Kingdom: Animalia
- Phylum: Chordata
- Class: Actinopterygii
- Order: Cichliformes
- Family: Cichlidae
- Subfamily: Pseudocrenilabrinae
- Tribe: Tilapiini
- Genus: Pterochromis; Trewavas, 1973
- Species: P. congicus

Binomial name
- Pterochromis congicus (Boulenger, 1897)

Synonyms
- Pelmatochromis congicus Boulenger, 1897

= Pterochromis congicus =

Species of fish

Pterochromis congicus is a species of cichlid native to the Congo River Basin in Central Africa. This species can reach a standard length of 15.2 cm (6.0 in). This genus and Pelmatolapia are the only members of the tribe Pelmatolapiini, but were formerly included in Tilapiini.
