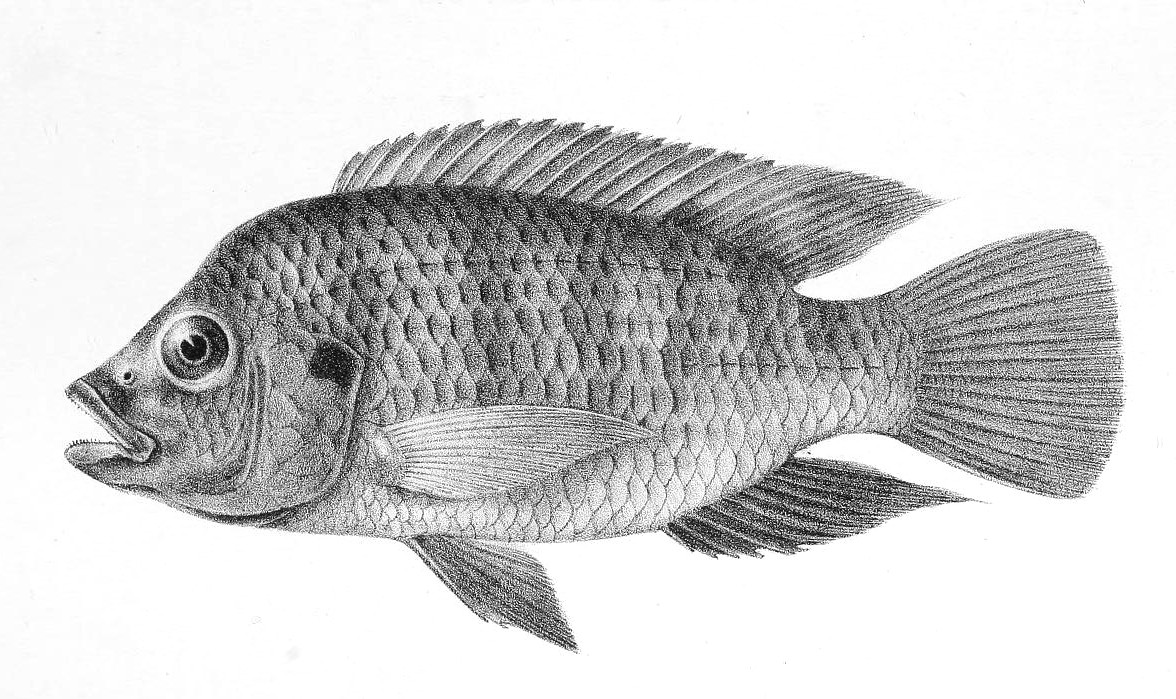

Conservation status
- Least Concern (IUCN 3.1)

Scientific classification
- Kingdom: Animalia
- Phylum: Chordata
- Class: Actinopterygii
- Order: Cichliformes
- Family: Cichlidae
- Genus: Tilapia
- Species: T. busumana

Binomial name
- Tilapia busumana (Günther, 1903)

Synonyms
- Tilapia fossilis White, 1937; Chromis busumanus Günther, 1903

= Tilapia busumana =

Species of fish

Tilapia busumana is a species of cichlid native to Lake Bosumtwi, the Bia River Basin, the Pra River Basin and the Tano River Basin in Ghana and Côte d'Ivoire. This species can reach a length of 18 centimetres (7.1 in) SL. It can also be found in the aquarium trade. In 2013, research published by Dunz & Schliewen indicated that this species does not belong in the genus Tilapia, but is rather closer to "Steatocranus" irvinei (itself not related to the remaining Steatocranus) and Gobiocichla. It is currently retained in Tilapia pending further research.
