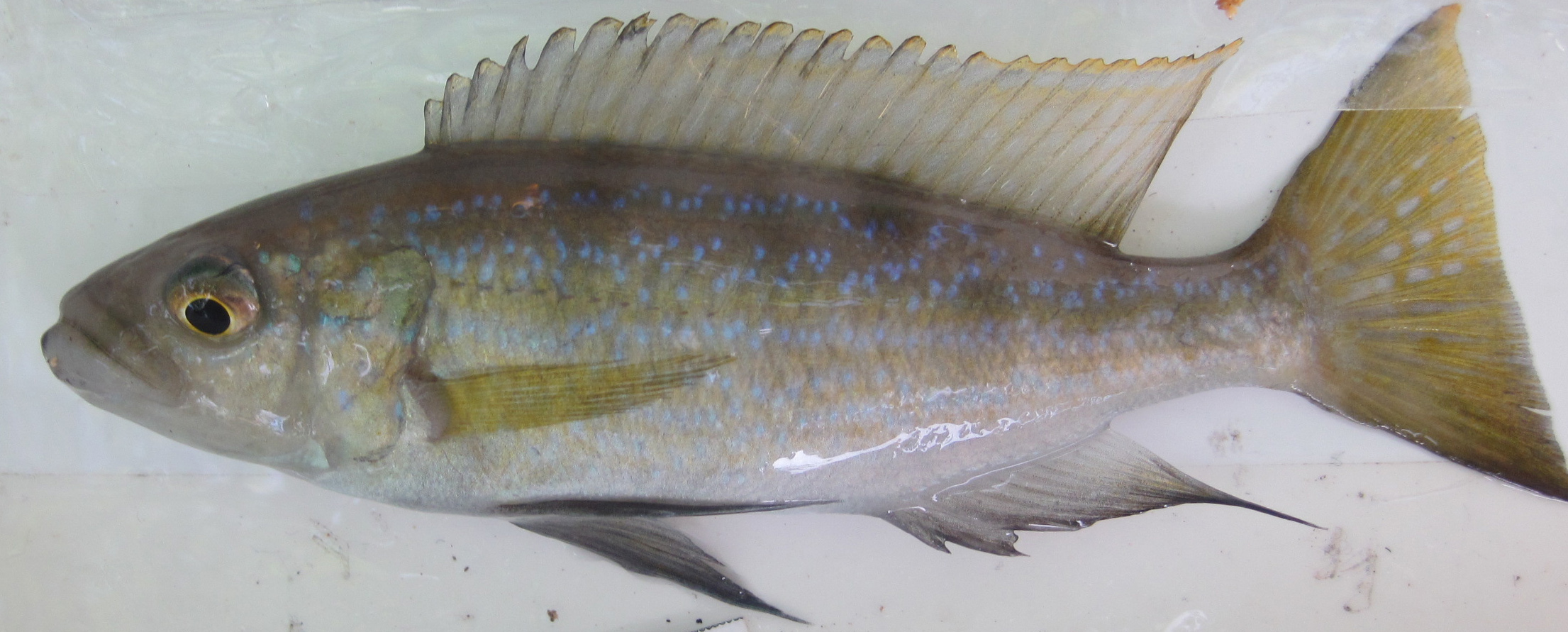
- Perissodus microlepis

Scientific classification
- Kingdom: Animalia
- Phylum: Chordata
- Class: Actinopterygii
- Order: Cichliformes
- Family: Cichlidae
- Subfamily: Pseudocrenilabrinae
- Tribe: Perissodini; Poll, 1986

Genera
- Haplotaxodon; Perissodus

= Perissodini =

Tribe of fishes

Perissodini is a tribe of African cichlids, containing two genera of freshwater fish found only in Lake Tanganyika.

One of its genera, Haplotaxodon, feeds on small fish and zooplankton. The other geneus is specialised in eating scales from other fish. They are all mouthbrooders.
