= Joka =

Joka may refer to:

- Joka (rapper), Polish rapper, member of Kaliber 44
- Joka, Kolkata, a locality in South West Kolkata, India, the home of IIM Calcutta
- Joka metro station, Kolkata
- Tilapia joka, species of aquarium fish
- Joka, a character in Klonoa: Door to Phantomile
