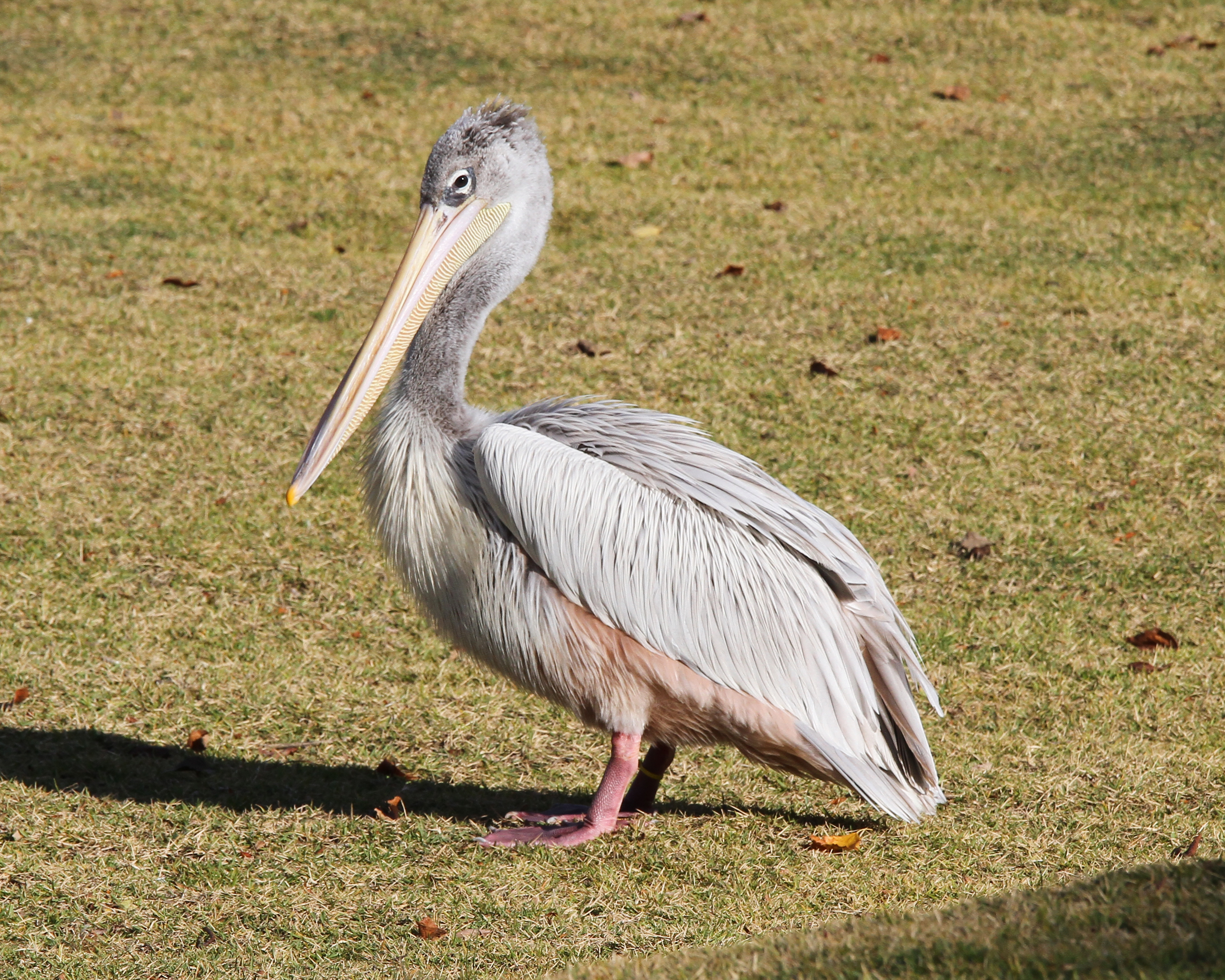

Conservation status
- Least Concern (IUCN 3.1)

Scientific classification
- Kingdom: Animalia
- Phylum: Chordata
- Class: Aves
- Order: Pelecaniformes
- Family: Pelecanidae
- Genus: Pelecanus
- Species: P. rufescens

Binomial name
- Pelecanus rufescens Gmelin, 1789
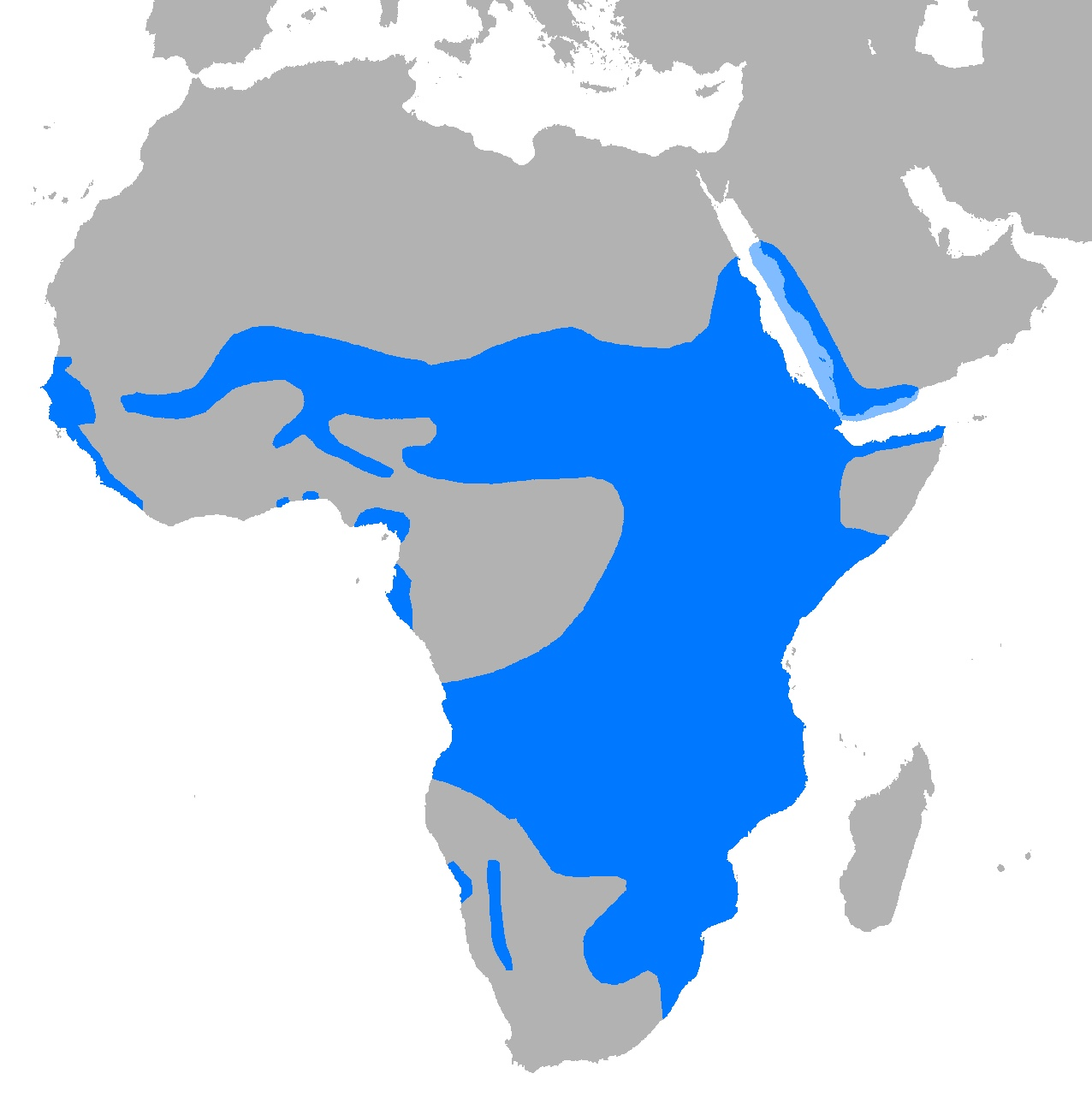

= Pink-backed pelican =

Species of bird

The pink-backed pelican (Pelecanus rufescens) is a bird of the pelican family. It is a resident breeder in the swamps and shallow lakes of Africa and southern Arabia; it has also been extirpated from Madagascar.

== Taxonomy ==
The pink-backed pelican was formally described in 1789 by the German naturalist Johann Friedrich Gmelin in his revised and expanded edition of Carl Linnaeus's Systema Naturae. He placed it with the other pelicans in the genus Pelecanus and coined the binomial name Pelecanus rufescens. Gmelin based his description on the "red-backed pelican" that had been described in 1785 by the English ornithologist John Latham in his multi-volume work A General Synopsis of Birds. Latham had been sent a specimen from West Africa. The specific epithet rufescens is Latin for "reddish". The species is monotypic: no subspecies are recognised.

== Description ==
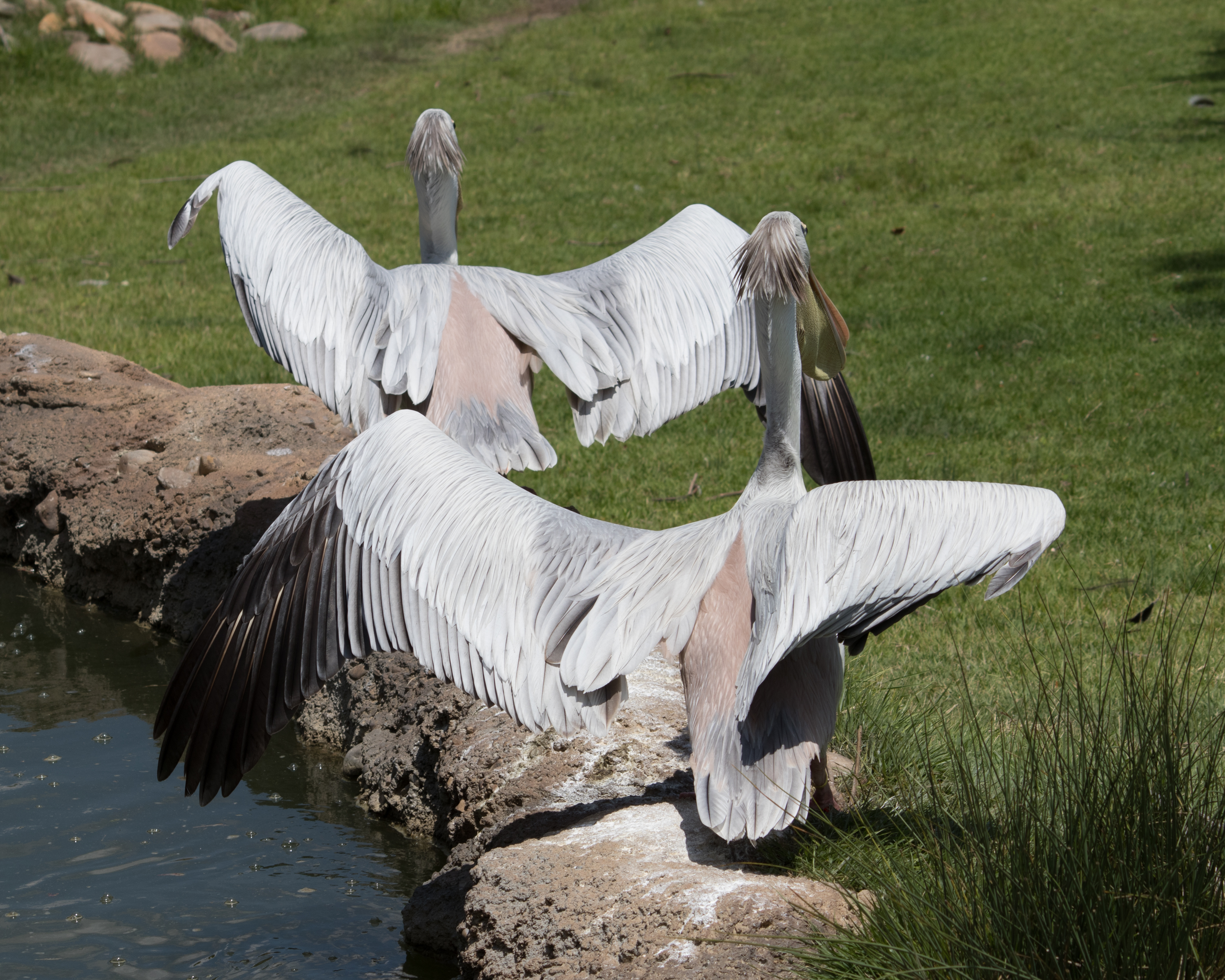
Dorsal view showing characteristic pink back

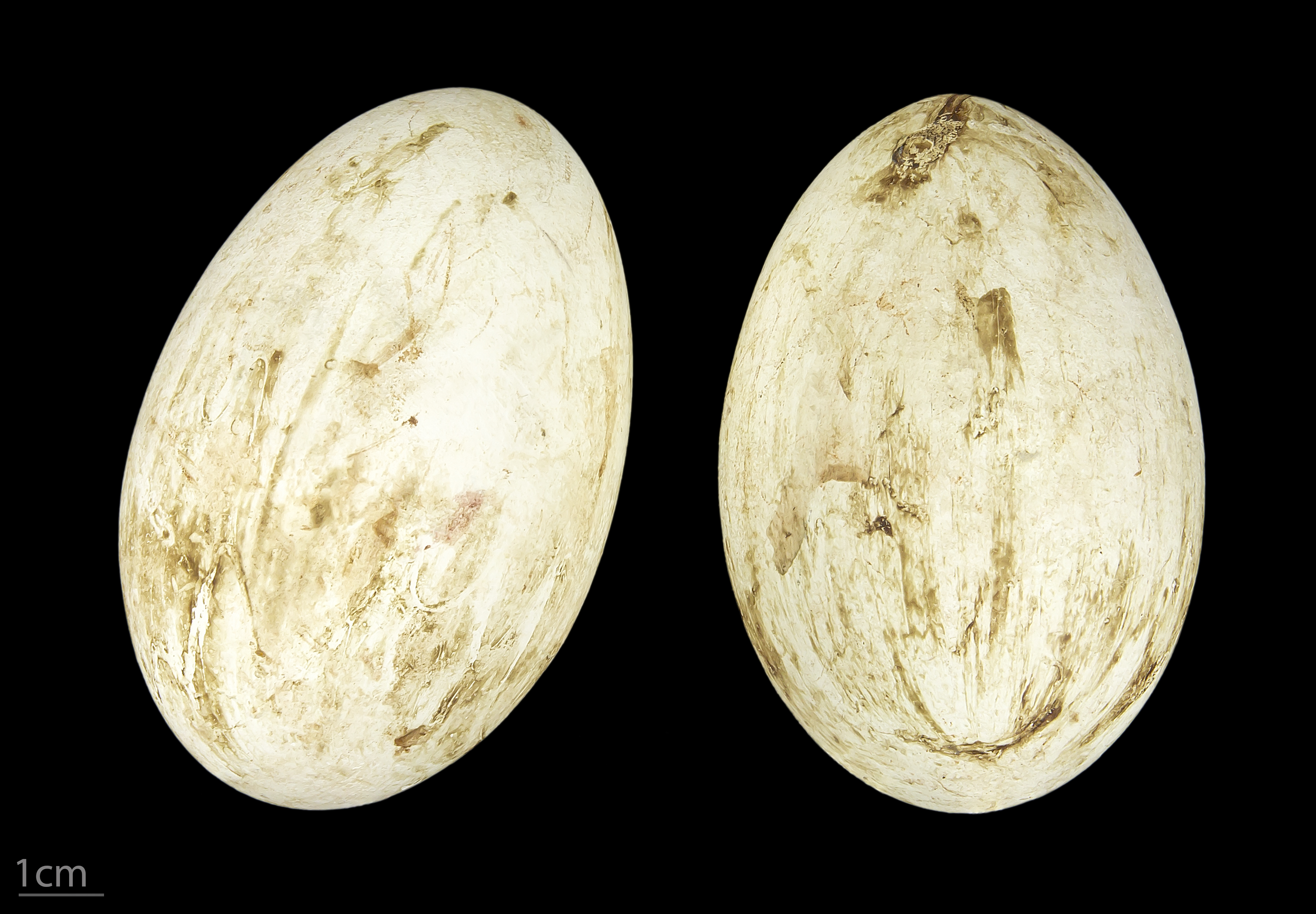
Pelecanus rufescens – MHNT

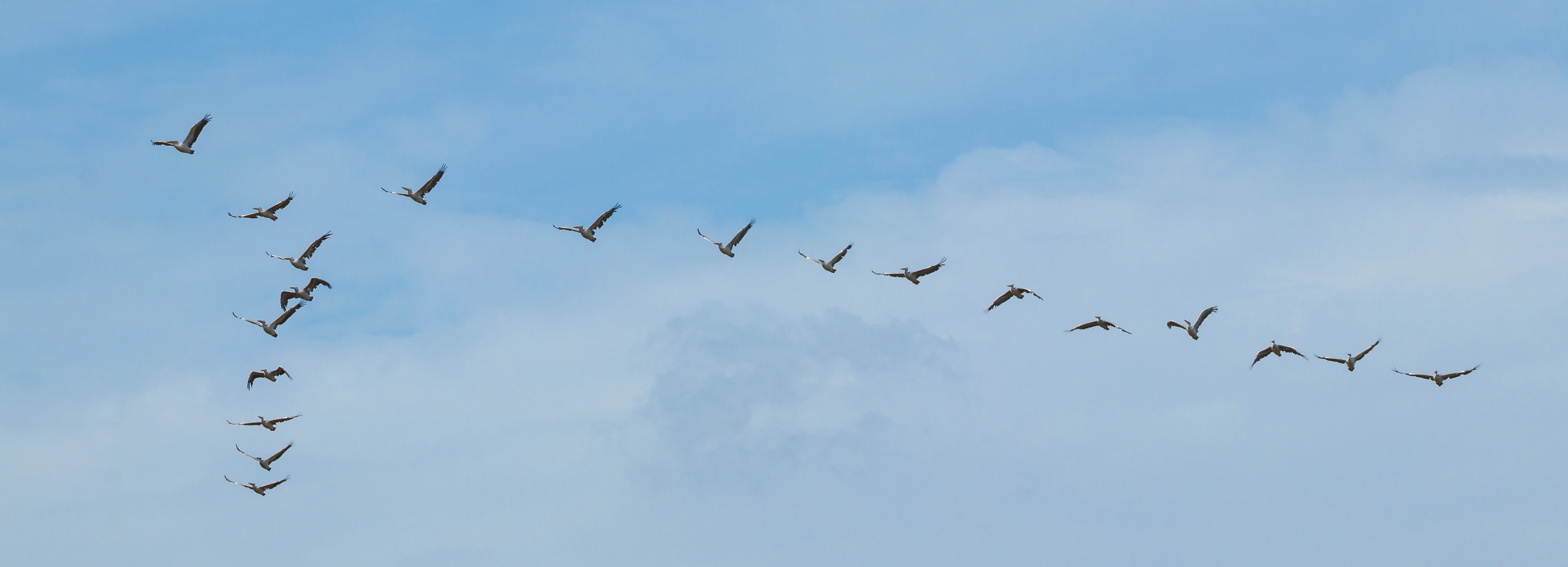
Formation flying

It is a relatively small pelican, although by no means is it a small bird. Its length is from 125 to 155 cm (49 to 61 in), wingspan is 2.15–2.9 m (7.1–9.5 ft) and body mass is from 4 to 7 kg (8.8 to 15.4 lb). The bill is 30 to 38 cm (12 to 15 in) in length. The plumage is grey and white, with a pinkish hue on the back occasionally apparent (never in the deep pink of a flamingo). The top of the bill is yellow and the pouch is usually greyish. Breeding adults have long feather plumes on the head.

It shares its habitat with the great white pelican, which is generally larger and has white instead of greyish plumage.

== Habitat and breeding ==
The pink-backed pelican is found in a range of aquatic habitats, but prefers quiet backwaters with shallow water, avoiding steep, vegetated lake banks. It prefers for freshwater lakes, swamps, large slow-flowing rivers, and seasonal pools but also frequents reservoirs, seasonally flooded land and flood-plains near river mouths. It may occur on alkaline and saline lakes and lagoons, and can sometimes be found along the coast in bays and estuaries (although seldom on open seashore). The species tends to roost and breed in trees (e.g. mangroves), but will also roost on sandy islands, cliffs, coral reefs and sand-dunes.

Nesting trees have many nests built close together. These nests are re-used every year until the trees collapse, although the birds will normally remain in the area. The species nests colonially in trees, reeds or low bushes along waterfronts as well as (less often) on the ground on sandy islands and in mangroves.

Its nest is a large heap of sticks and may be 10–50 m (33–164 ft) above the ground. The female lays two to three large white eggs and later the chicks feed by plunging their heads deep into the adult's pouch and taking the partially digested regurgitated fish.

== Diet ==
Food is usually fish (of any size up to 450 g (16 oz), usually in the 80–290 g (2.8–10.2 oz) range) and amphibians, and is usually obtained by fishing in groups. Among the fish preyed upon are cichlids like Haplochromis and Tilapia.
