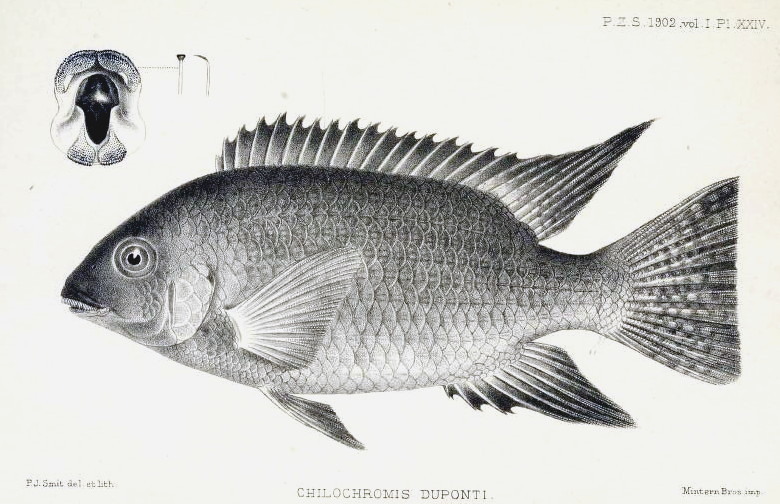

Conservation status
- Least Concern (IUCN 3.1)

Scientific classification
- Kingdom: Animalia
- Phylum: Chordata
- Class: Actinopterygii
- Order: Cichliformes
- Family: Cichlidae
- Subfamily: Pseudocrenilabrinae
- Tribe: Tilapiini
- Genus: Chilochromis; Boulenger, 1902
- Species: C. duponti

Binomial name
- Chilochromis duponti Boulenger, 1902

= Chilochromis =

Genus of fishes

Chilochromis duponti is a species of cichlid endemic to riverine habitats in the Chiloango River basin of Cabinda Province of Angola and the Democratic Republic of the Congo, the Kouilou-Niari River and lower Loeme River in the Republic of Congo, and the Nyanga basin and upper Ngounie River which is part of the Ogooué system in Gabon. The main part of its diet is aquatic vegetation, largely algae, but small amounts of invertebrates are eaten. It is spawns on to the substrate. This species reaches a length of 30 centimetres (12 in) SL. It is the only currently known member of its genus. The specific name honours Édouard Dupont (1841-1911), a Belgian geologist who was a pioneer of the geological exploration of the Congo Basin and a director of the Brussels Museum.
