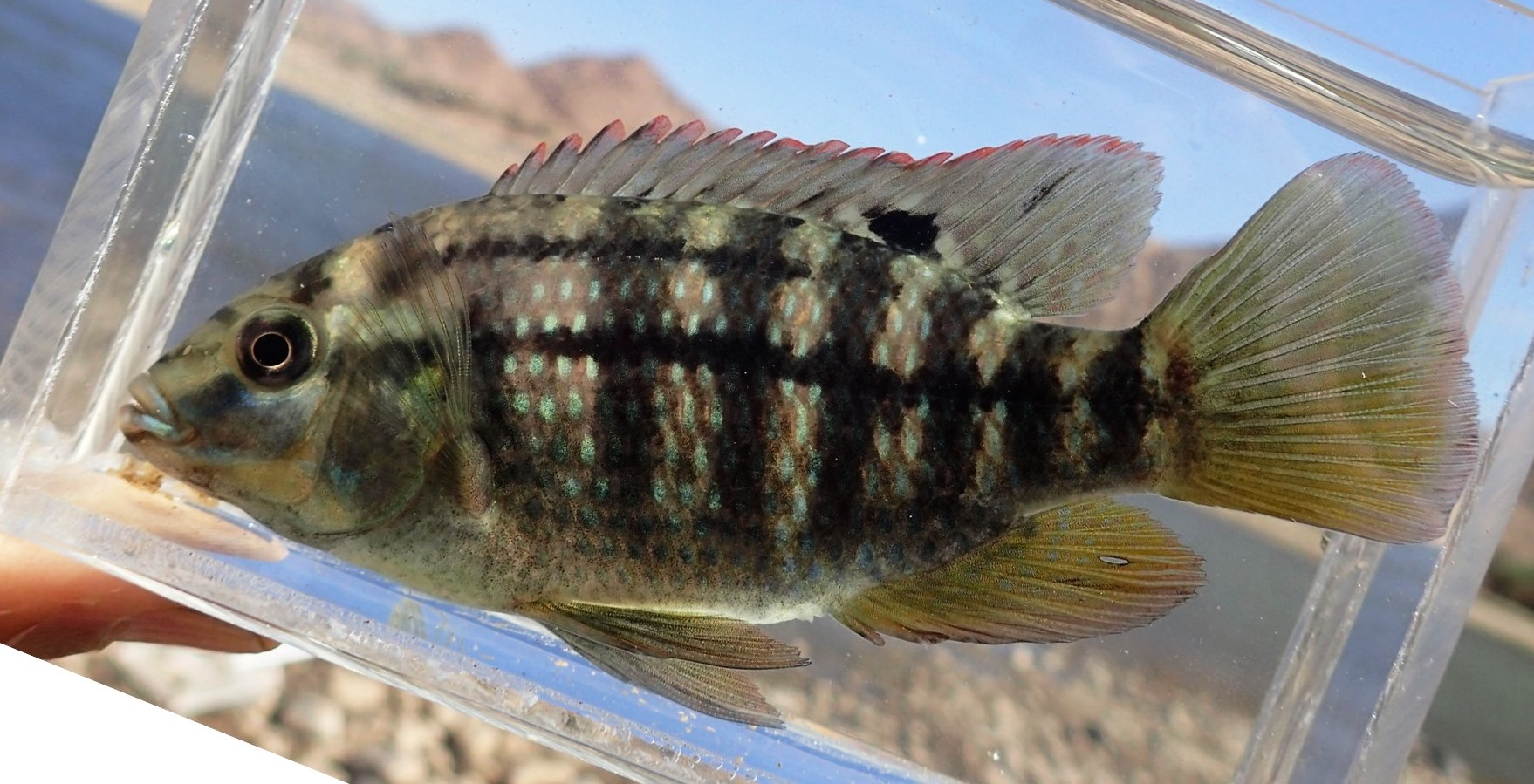
- Banded tilapia, Tilapia sparrmanii

Scientific classification
- Kingdom: Animalia
- Phylum: Chordata
- Class: Actinopterygii
- Order: Cichliformes
- Family: Cichlidae
- Tribe: Tilapiini
- Genus: Tilapia; A. Smith, 1840

Type species
- Tilapia sparrmanii A. Smith, 1840

Species
- 4, see text

Synonyms
- Chromis Günther, 1862 (non Cuvier, 1814: preoccupied)

= Tilapia (genus) =

Genus of fishes

Tilapia is a genus of cichlid fishes endemic to freshwater habitats in Southern Africa. In the past this was a very large genus including all species with the common name tilapia, but today the vast majority are placed in other genera.

== Species and taxonomy ==
In the past, Oreochromis and Sarotherodon were retained in the genus Tilapia, but these are treated as separate genera by all recent authorities. Even with this more restricted Tilapia, there were indications that the taxonomic treatment was problematic, and in 2013 a review of the group resulted in the removal of most "Tilapia" species to the genera Coelotilapia, Coptodon, Heterotilapia and Pelmatolapia. With these as separate genera, only four species remain in Tilapia:

- Tilapia baloni Trewavas & D. J. Stewart, 1975
- Tilapia guinasana Trewavas, 1936 (Otjikoto tilapia)
- Tilapia ruweti (Poll & Thys van den Audenaerde, 1965) (Okavango tilapia)
- Tilapia sparrmanii A. Smith, 1840 (Banded tilapia)

Temporarily retained here, but belonging elsewhere:

- "Tilapia" brevimanus Boulenger, 1911 – closer to "Steatocranus" irvinei (itself not related to the remaining Steatocranus) and Gobiocichla.
- "Tilapia" busumana (Günther, 1903) – closer to "Steatocranus" irvinei (itself not related to the remaining Steatocranus) and Gobiocichla.
- "Tilapia" pra Dunz & Schliewen, 2010 – closer to "Steatocranus" irvinei (itself not related to the remaining Steatocranus) and Gobiocichla.
