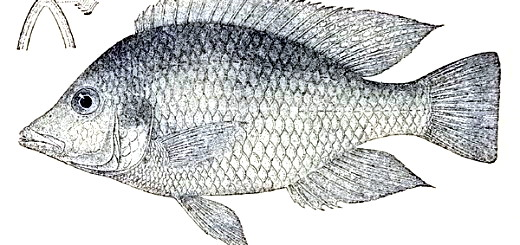

Conservation status
- Least Concern (IUCN 3.1)

Scientific classification
- Kingdom: Animalia
- Phylum: Chordata
- Class: Actinopterygii
- Order: Cichliformes
- Family: Cichlidae
- Subfamily: Pseudocrenilabrinae
- Tribe: Haplochromini
- Genus: Hemitilapia; Boulenger, 1902
- Species: H. oxyrhynchus

Binomial name
- Hemitilapia oxyrhynchus Boulenger, 1902

Synonyms
- Haplochromis oxyrhynchus (Boulenger, 1902)

= Giant haplochromis =

Species of fish

The giant haplochromis (Hemitilapia oxyrhynchus) is a species of cichlid endemic to Lake Malawi and Lake Malombe, preferring areas with sandy substrates and Vallisneria patches. It is an algae eater, obtaining its food by scraping it from the leaves of aquatic plants. This species grows to a length of 20 centimetres (7.9 in) TL. This fish can also be found in the aquarium trade. This species is the only known member of its genus.
