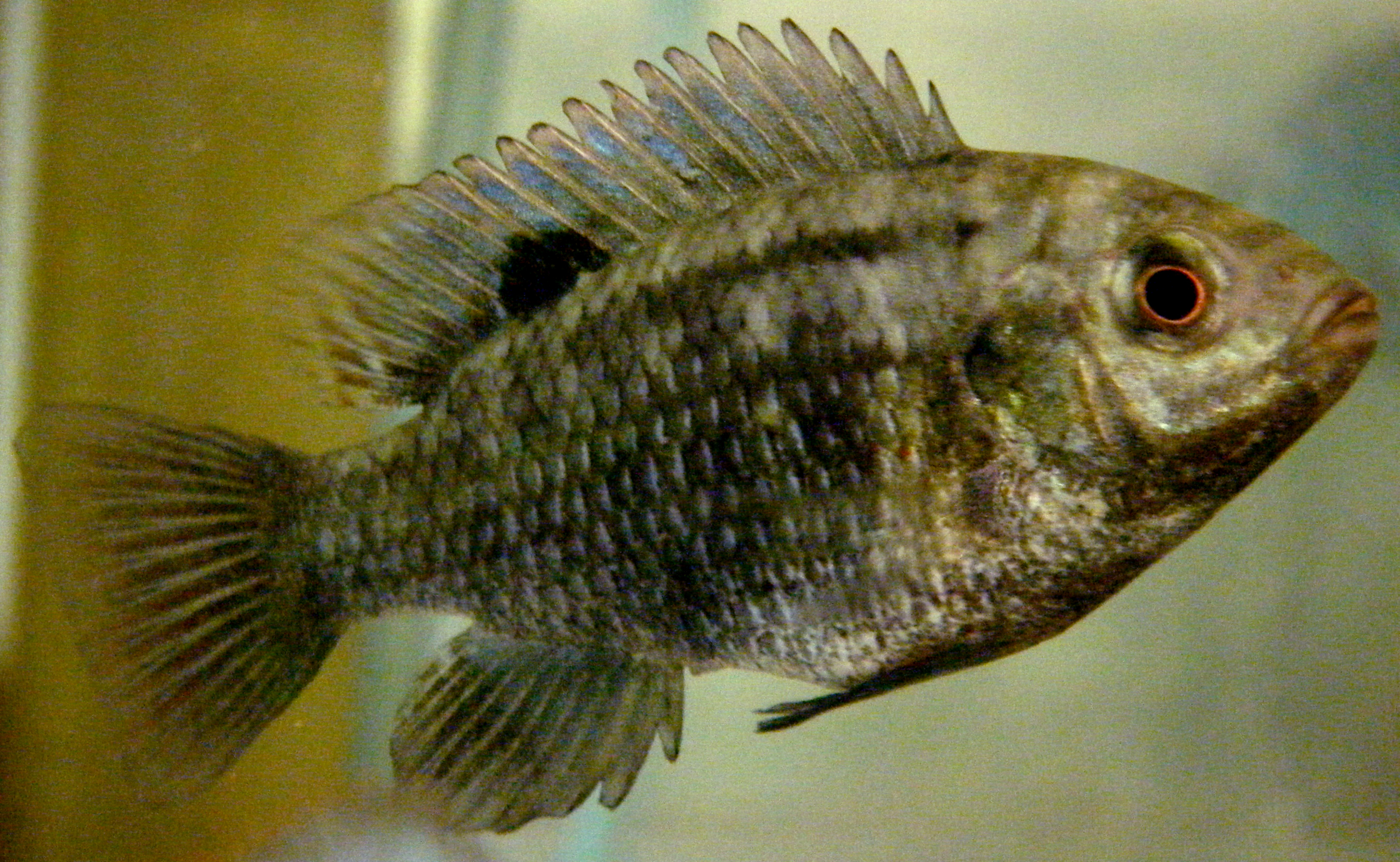
- Tilapia sparrmanii

Scientific classification
- Kingdom: Animalia
- Phylum: Chordata
- Class: Actinopterygii
- Order: Cichliformes
- Family: Cichlidae
- Subfamily: Pseudocrenilabrinae
- Tribe: Tilapiini

Genera
- Chilochromis Boulenger; Congolapia Dunz, Vreven & Schliewen, 2012; Tilapia Smith, 1840

Synonyms
- Tilapiinae

= Tilapiine cichlid =

Tilapiine cichlids

Tribe of fishes

The Tilapiini (occasionally Tilapini) are a tribe within the family Cichlidae commonly known as tilapiine cichlids. Formerly this tribe contained many other genera and species, including the economically important Oreochromis and Sarotherodon, but a taxonomic review found that this grouping was paraphyletic and most were moved to Coelotilapini, Coptodonini, Heterotilapini, Oreochromini and Pelmatolapiini. Together, most species in these tribes are called "tilapias". In a more distant past, a number of other, more different genera like Steatocranus also were included in Tilapiini. With these as separate, Tilapiini now is a much more restricted tribe with only three genera and about half a dozen species from Central and Southern Africa.

== Systematics ==
The tilapiines were recognised by the ichthyologist Ethylwynn Trewavas.

mtDNA-based phylogenies of tilapiines must be evaluated with caution, however, as they are usually close to, but do not represent the true evolutionary relationships of these fishes. The reason is that hybridization within any one of these major lineages is known to usually produce fertile offspring, and might also do so between the lineages. Gene pools in these fishes have been kept (largely) separate by behavioral cues for millions of years, but reproductive incompatibility has been far slower to evolve, like in many Pseudocrenilabrinae (African cichlids).

A small sample size—one to a mere handful of specimens per taxon—as is often used in molecular studies further acerbates the problem. As discussed below for the example of mouthbreeding, nonmolecular data such as morphology or behavior have also turned out to be extremely prone to homoplasies, not the least due to the small but ongoing gene flow between evolutionarily quite distant gene pools.

Essentially, most traditional and mtDNA-based phylogenetic hypothesis for tilapiines must be considered with a high degree of caution. This problem could be alleviated to some extent by using nDNA sequences. Comparing these with the mtDNA data, hybridization effects could be discerned. Also, resolution of nDNA likely is still good enough to delimit the clades that apparently exist in the "tilapiines" if numerous taxa and specimens are sampled. Researchers could then reanalyze morphological data to discover actual autapomorphies.

Evolution seems to run quickly in this group. Even the fast-evolving mtDNA sequences often are incapable of properly resolving interspecies relationships. The precise evolutionary history of some tilapiines may not be properly resolved with presently available methods, for the reasons discussed above.

== Diversity of breeding behaviour ==
Like other cichlids, tilapiines exhibit complex reproductive behaviours and guard their eggs and fry. Broadly speaking, the plesiomorphic trait is substratum-spawning behavior, meaning that the fish form pairs, lay the eggs on a rock or into a depression made in the substrate, and then both parents guard the eggs and fry.
