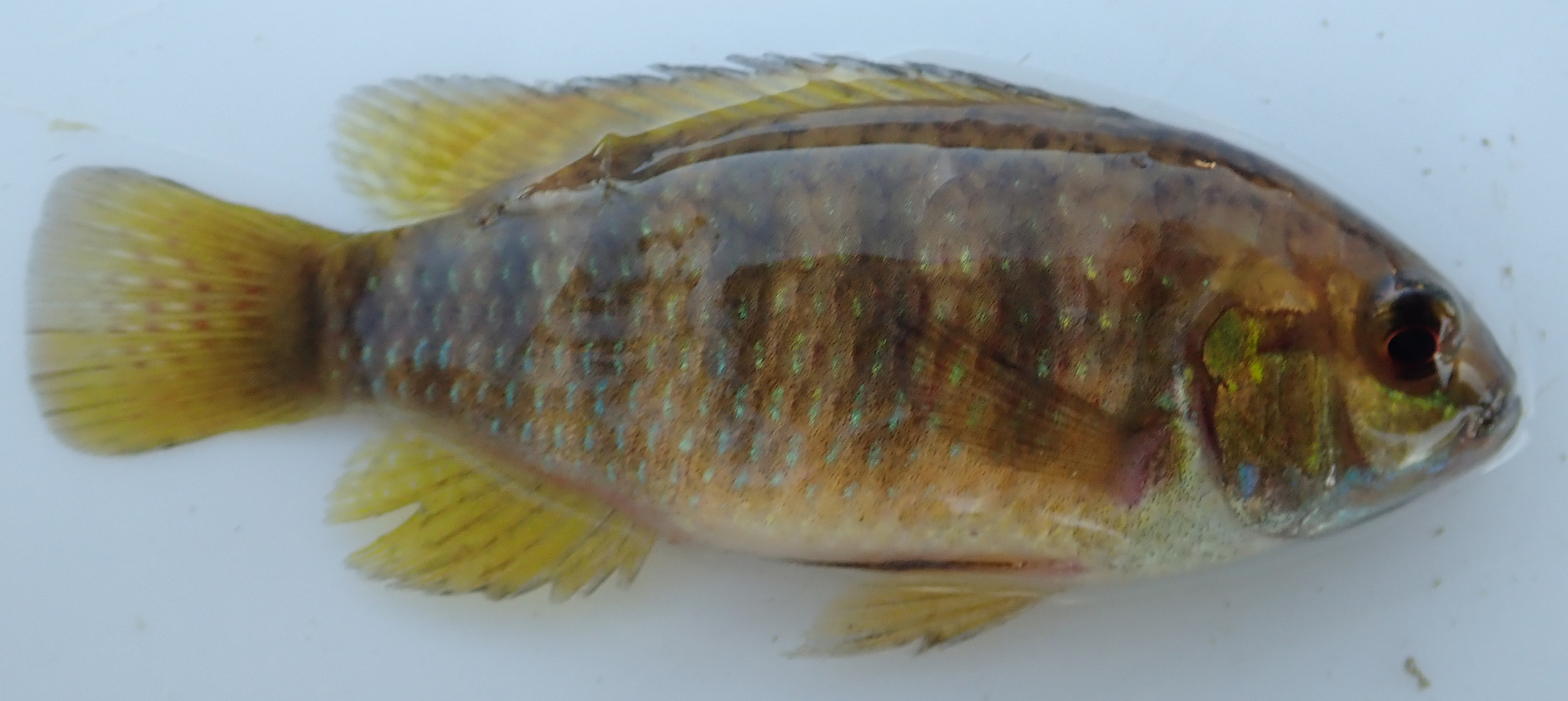

Conservation status
- Least Concern (IUCN 3.1)

Scientific classification
- Kingdom: Animalia
- Phylum: Chordata
- Class: Actinopterygii
- Order: Cichliformes
- Family: Cichlidae
- Genus: Tilapia
- Species: T. ruweti

Binomial name
- Tilapia ruweti (Poll & Thys van den Audenaerde, 1965)

= Tilapia ruweti =

Species of fish

Tilapia ruweti, the Okavango tilapia, is a freshwater fish found in the Okavango Delta, the upper Zambezi River and southern tributaries of the Congo River
