= Trematochromis benthicola =

Conservation status
- Least Concern (IUCN 3.1)

Scientific classification
- Kingdom: Animalia
- Phylum: Chordata
- Class: Actinopterygii
- Division: Teleostei
- Order: Cichliformes
- Family: Cichlidae
- Subfamily: Pseudocrenilabrinae
- Tribe: Haplochromini
- Genus: Trematochromis; Poll, 1987
- Species: T. benthicola

Binomial name
- Trematochromis benthicola (Matthes, 1962)

Synonyms
- Haplochromis benthicola Matthes, 1962; Ctenochromis benthicola (Matthes, 1962) (but see text); Trematochromis schreyeni Poll, 1987

Species of fish

Trematochromis benthicola is a ray-finned fish species in the cichlid family (Cichlidae), subfamily Pseudocrenilabrinae and the tribe Haplochromini. It is found throughout Lake Tanganyika in the Burundian, the Democratic Republic of the Congo, Tanzanian, and Zambian shoreline. Its preferred habitat are the hidden recesses of caves in shallow water.

This species was described in 1962. At the time of its discovery placed in Haplochromis – then a "wastebin genus" for Haplochromini cichlids – it was subsequently moved to Ctenochromis, but differs somewhat from the fishes otherwise placed there. Consequently, it has been proposed for separation in a monotypic genus Trematochromis, which was established in 1987 when "C." benthicola was mistakenly described a second time.
