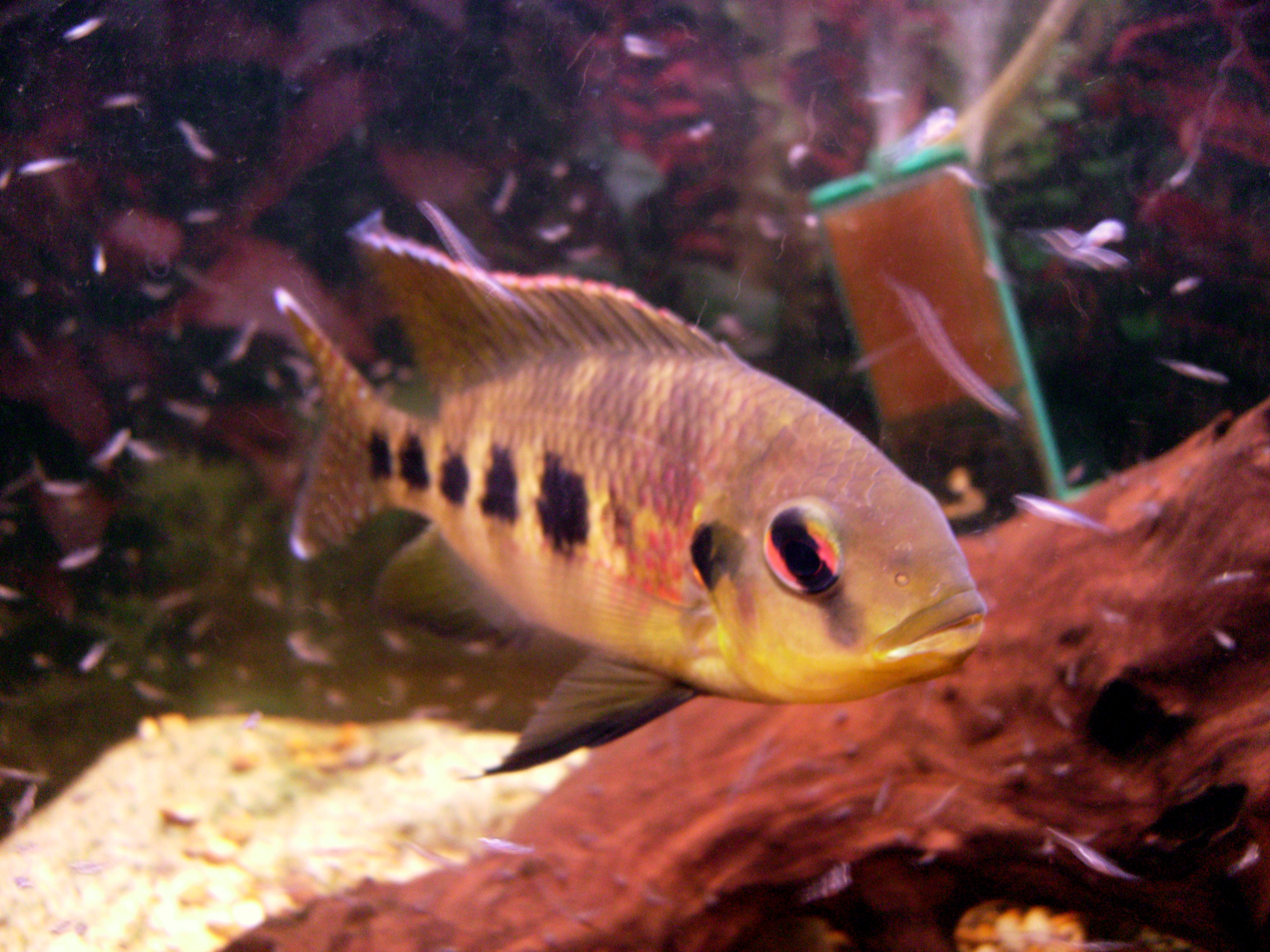
- Spotted tilapia (adult) in an aquarium

Conservation status
- Least Concern (IUCN 3.1)

Scientific classification
- Kingdom: Animalia
- Phylum: Chordata
- Class: Actinopterygii
- Order: Cichliformes
- Family: Cichlidae
- Genus: Pelmatolapia
- Species: P. mariae

Binomial name
- Pelmatolapia mariae (Boulenger, 1899)

Synonyms
- Tilapia mariae Boulenger, 1899; Tilapia mariae mariae Boulenger, 1899; Tilapia dubia Lönnberg, 1904; Tilapia mariae dubia Lönnberg, 1904; Tilapia meeki Pellegrin, 1911

= Spotted tilapia =

Species of fish

The spotted tilapia (Pelmatolapia mariae), also known as the spotted mangrove cichlid or black mangrove cichlid, is a species of fish of the cichlid family. It is native to fresh and brackish water in West and Central Africa, but has been introduced to other regions where it is considered invasive.

Spotted tilapia have high fecundity, simple food requirements and extensive tolerance of environmental variables such as water temperature, salinity, and pollution. These characteristics allow spotted cichlids to rapidly populate many areas that have an appropriate habitat. Typically spotted tilapia tend to be an aggressive and territorial species, and research has found that internal reproductive androgenic factors can overrule the effect of size on dominance encounters in this species.

== Appearance ==
Spotted tilapia have a short rounded snout and three anal spines. They are dark olive green to light yellowish in colour and have eight or nine dark bars on their sides which are more evident in young spotted tilapia than adults. They also have two to six dark spots between the bars on the middle of their side and they reach a maximum standard length of 32.3 cm (1.1 ft). Spotted tilapia have a rapid growth rate and maturation time.

== Habitat ==
Spotted tilapia are native to Africa from the Côte d'Ivoire to Ghana, and Benin to Cameroon. They have also established large feral populations outside of their native ranges, such as in Florida and Australia. Spotted tilapia live in a variety of habitats. They have been found in both still and flowing waters, in shallow and deep water, in places where there is both little or no coverage and in rocky and debris-strewn areas.

== Breeding and parental care ==
Like several other tilapiine cichlids, the spotted tilapia is notable for its adaptability and prolific breeding. spotted tilapia breed when they are about 15 cm (6 in) long and generally breed year long with peaks in November, March–April and July–September. They lay up to 1800 eggs usually on submerged logs, rocks or plants and the eggs hatch after approximately three days.

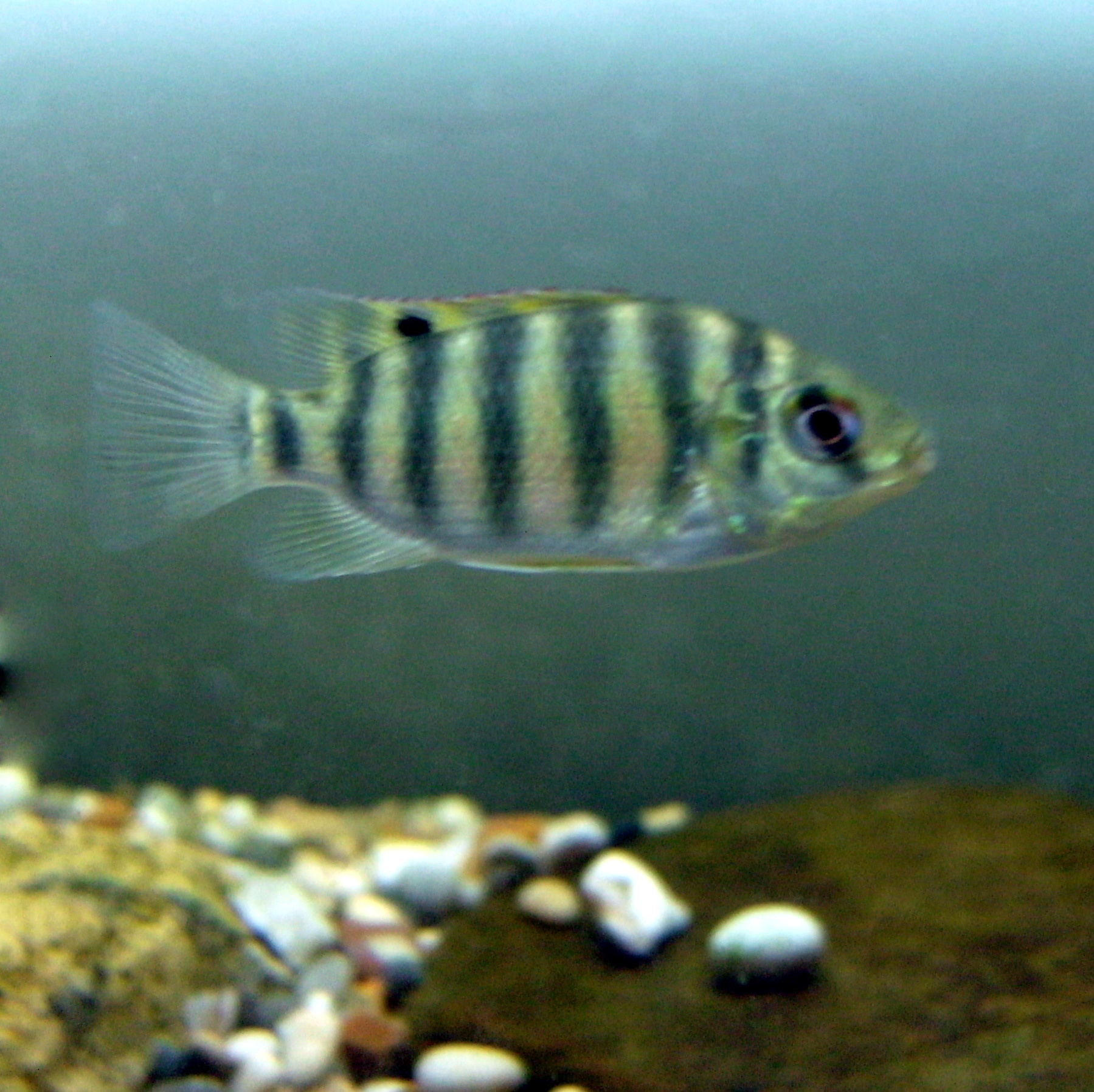
A juvenile spotted tilapia approx 5 cm (2 in)

Spotted tilapia are monogamous fish who engage in biparental care, and research has found that the size of the eggs tend to increase with the amount of parental care. The males and females both have very specific roles in parenting and work together to ensure the well being of their offspring. The females prepare the nest by clearing an area on rocky substrate. After spawning, the females take care of all embryo tending while males stay about 2 to 3 m (6.6–9.8 ft) away and remain mostly inactive except for an occasional feeding or chasing away of predators. When the offspring become two to three days old they rise off the nest and form a school. This causes a dramatic change in parental role as the male becomes active and the female begins to spend more time away from the young, guarding ahead of the school by chasing away predators. Parental care continues until the fish are about 2.5 to 3 cm (1.0–1.2 in). This biparental behaviour could help explain why black tilapia are able to live in many different habitats and become dominant over other fish populations in the same area.

== Ecology ==
Spotted tilapia feed mainly on plant matter and males and females never feed at the same time. Instead, one will feed while the other stays close by and then they will switch. There are a number of factors that contribute to the natural mortality of spotted tilapia. Their predators include the electric catfish Malapterurus electricus which preys on the eggs of spotted tilapia, and African pike and obscure snakehead which prey on the adults. Spotted tilapia are also prone to heavy intestinal infection caused by nematode parasites which causes death. Also, they sometimes get swept away from their streams by flooding caused by rain into small residual pools over the banks of the stream where they become stranded. Then, when the rain stops the pools dry out they die. Spotted tilapia are important ecologically as well as commercially and as a result are commonly exploited and cultured.

== As an invasive species ==
In the regions where the spotted tilapia has been introduced it is considered invasive. One main problem with spotted tilapia in their introduced range is that they tend to become the dominant fish in many lakes, rivers and canals. They have even been found to at times comprise over half of the total fish biomass and therefore, they cause other previously dominant fish populations to decrease. Spotted tilapia are strong, aggressive and very territorial and have the ability to disturb the habitat of other fish populations.

=== In Australia ===
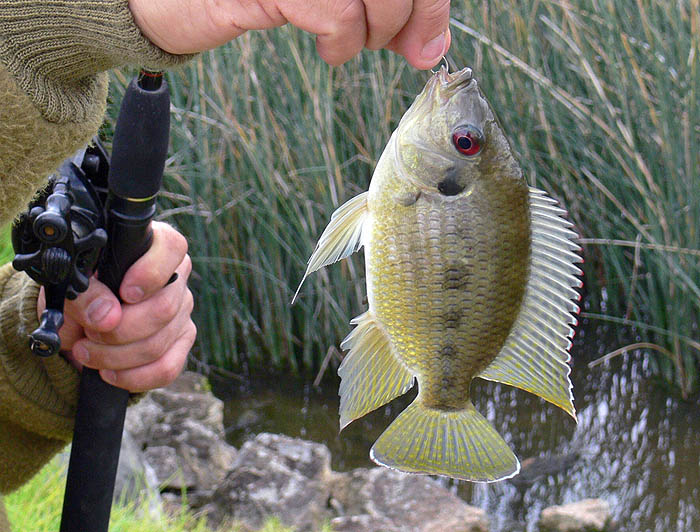
Spotted tilapia caught at the heated outflow of a powerplant in southern Australia

It is believed that spotted tilapia got to Australia through a series of events. First it is thought that all tilapia populations derived from the importation of small numbers of individuals for the freshwater aquarium industry from Singapore or Indonesia. Captive individuals were then dispersed throughout Australia by the industry of fish fanciers. Then, some spotted tilapia escaped or were released and self-sustaining populations arose. The expansion of the spotted tilapia species in Australia has potential adverse effects on the native fish faunas that currently exist in Australia. Since they tend to become the dominant fish where they live, their expansion into Australia could be harmful to the other existing fish populations. Another way in which spotted tilapia have become a pest in Australia is that they have been found living in the cooling pondage of the Hazelwood Power Station in Victoria, Australia as well as in the creek just below the pondage. The water temperature in Victoria is far too low for them to survive outside this habitat they have created, however it is a nuisance for the power station that they live here.

=== Reaction in Australia ===
Since spotted tilapia are considered to be a class 3 noxious fish in Australia it is illegal to possess, sell or buy this species in New South Wales, Australia without a permit. NSW fisheries are closely monitoring the populations of spotted tilapia and heavy fines of up to AU$11,000 apply for being in possession or caught buying or selling this species. The NSW fisheries have the right to seize the fish and destroy them if necessary.

== Etymology ==
The specific name honours the English writer and explorer Mary Henrietta Kingsley (1862-1900), who had gained possession of the type of this cichlid .
