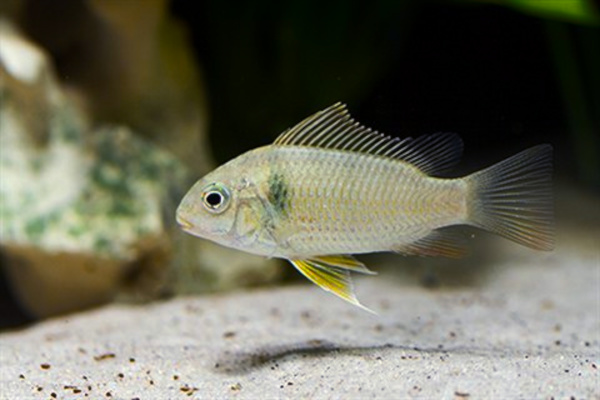

Conservation status
- Data Deficient (IUCN 3.1)

Scientific classification
- Kingdom: Animalia
- Phylum: Chordata
- Class: Actinopterygii
- Order: Cichliformes
- Family: Cichlidae
- Subfamily: Pseudocrenilabrinae
- Tribe: Etiini; Dunz & Schliewen, 2013
- Genus: Etia; Schliewen & Stiassny, 2003
- Species: E. nguti

Binomial name
- Etia nguti Schliewen & Stiassny, 2003

= Etia =

Species of fish

Etia nguti is a species of cichlid fish endemic to Cameroon in Central Africa where it is only known from the Nguti River (Ehumbve river), a tributary of the Cross-Manyu River. This species can reach up to 13.3 centimetres (5.2 in) in standard length. It is the only member of its genus and tribe.

== Etymology ==
The meaning of the generic name Etia is explained in the original description: "Etymology. Named for Ethelwynn Trewavas whose ground-breaking work on cichlid biology spanned some 60 years. Her creativity, humility and kindness are legendary. Ethelwynn was known to colleagues throughout the world as "E.T." and it is in her memory that the generic designation is made. Gender feminine." The species name refers to the village Nguti in Southwestern Cameroon where the majority of the type series was collected.
