= Haplochromis rubripinnis =

Conservation status
- Least Concern (IUCN 3.1)

Scientific classification
- Kingdom: Animalia
- Phylum: Chordata
- Class: Actinopterygii
- Order: Cichliformes
- Family: Cichlidae
- Genus: Haplochromis
- Species: H. rubripinnis

Binomial name
- Haplochromis rubripinnis (Seehausen, Lippitsch & Bouton, 1998)

Synonyms
- Lithochromis rubripinnis Seehausen, Lippitsch & Bouton, 1998

Species of fish

Haplochromis rubripinnis is a species of cichlid endemic to Lake Victoria. This species can reach a length of 10.4 centimetres (4.1 in) SL. This species may be placed back in the genus Lithochromis when a comprehensive review of Haplochromis is carried out.
