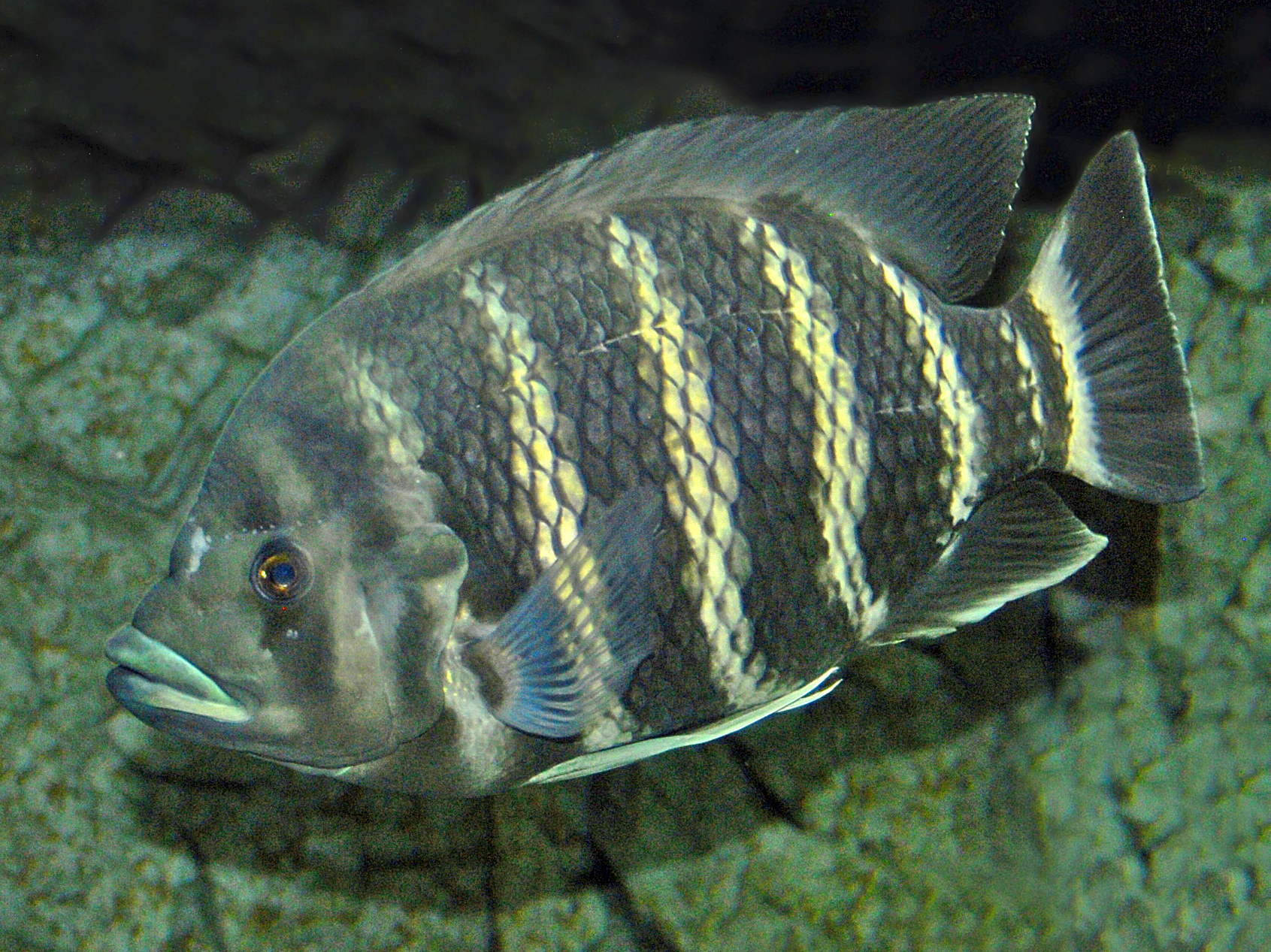
- T. buttikoferi

Scientific classification
- Kingdom: Animalia
- Phylum: Chordata
- Class: Actinopterygii
- Order: Cichliformes
- Family: Cichlidae
- Subfamily: Pseudocrenilabrinae
- Tribe: Heterotilapini; Dunz & Schliewen, 2013
- Genus: Heterotilapia; Regan, 1920

Type species
- Chromis buttikoferi Hubrecht, 1881

= Heterotilapia =

Genus of fishes

Heterotilapia is a genus of cichlid fish that are native to rivers from Guinea-Bissau to Liberia in tropical West Africa. Formerly considered a subgenus of Tilapia, in 2013, it was elevated to genus rank. They are medium-large cichlids, up to about 20–30 cm (8–12 in) in standard length depending on the species, and with a distinctive dark-and-light banded pattern. They are substrate spawners and brooders (not mouthbrooders as some other tilapias). H. buttikoferi is a common species that also has been introduced outside its native range, but H. cessiana is highly localized and critically endangered.

== Species ==
Two recognized species are in this genus:

- Heterotilapia buttikoferi (Hubrecht, 1881) (zebra tilapia)
- Heterotilapia cessiana (Thys van den Audenaerde, 1968)
