= Haplochromis rufus =

Conservation status
- Least Concern (IUCN 3.1)

Scientific classification
- Kingdom: Animalia
- Phylum: Chordata
- Class: Actinopterygii
- Order: Cichliformes
- Family: Cichlidae
- Genus: Haplochromis
- Species: H. rufus

Binomial name
- Haplochromis rufus (Seehausen & Lippitsch, 1998)

Synonyms
- Lithochromis rufus Seehausen & Lippitsch, 1998

Species of fish

Haplochromis rufus is a species of cichlid endemic to Lake Victoria where it is found over rocky substrates in the southern portion of the lake. This species can reach a length of 8.6 centimetres (3.4 in) SL. This species may be placed back in the genus Lithochromis when a comprehensive review of Haplochromis is carried out.
