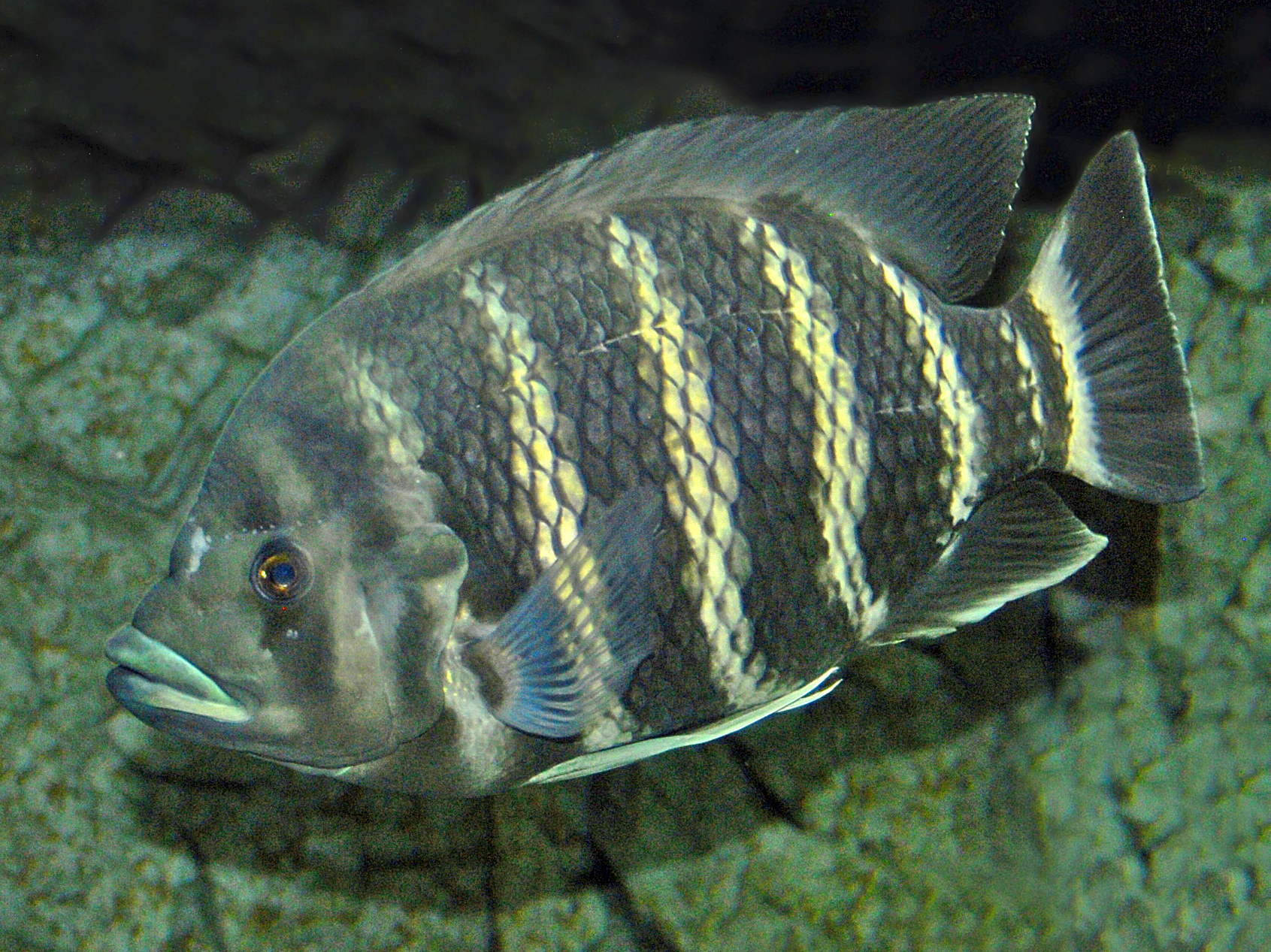
- A Heterotilapia buttikoferi in an aquarium

Conservation status
- Least Concern (IUCN 3.1)

Scientific classification
- Kingdom: Animalia
- Phylum: Chordata
- Class: Actinopterygii
- Order: Cichliformes
- Family: Cichlidae
- Genus: Heterotilapia
- Species: H. buttikoferi

Binomial name
- Heterotilapia buttikoferi (Hubrecht, 1881)

Synonyms
- Chromis buttikoferi Hubrecht, 1881; Tilapia buttikoferi (Hubrecht, 1881); Tilapia ansorgii Boulenger, 1911

= Heterotilapia buttikoferi =

Species of fish

Heterotilapia buttikoferi, also known as the zebra tilapia, is a West African species of cichlid.

== Description ==
H. buttikoferi is a large cichlid, capable of growing up to 30.8 cm (12.1 in) in standard length. Its body is typically yellow or white with black stripes, which can vary from very light to near black depending on the mood of the fish. The vertical black bars are broader than the lighter interspaces. Their stripes tend to fade as they age.

== Distribution and habitat ==
This freshwater fish is native to large rivers in tropical West Africa from Guinea-Bissau to Liberia. People have imported and bred them in several other parts the world for aquarium or food purposes.

H. buttikoferi is an alien species in Thailand, where it has been introduced for use as an aquarium fish. Reportedly, the species has spread to the Srinakarin Dam, Kanchanaburi Province and Sirikit Dam, Uttaradit Province.

== Etymology ==
The specific name honours Swiss zoologist Johann Büttikofer (1850–1927), the collector of the type specimen.

== See also ==
- List of freshwater aquarium fish species
