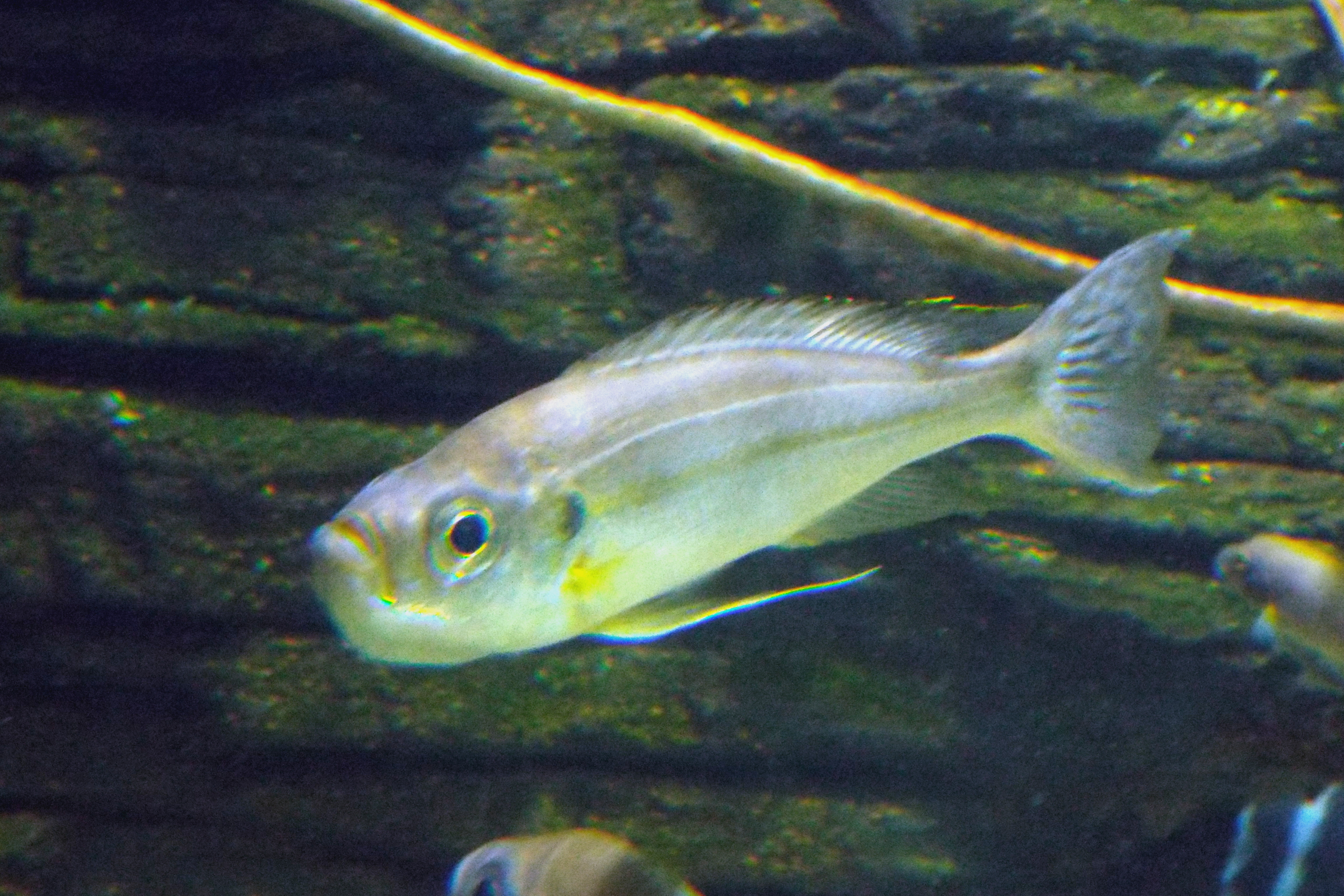

Conservation status
- Least Concern (IUCN 3.1)

Scientific classification
- Kingdom: Animalia
- Phylum: Chordata
- Class: Actinopterygii
- Order: Cichliformes
- Family: Cichlidae
- Genus: Haplotaxodon
- Species: H. microlepis

Binomial name
- Haplotaxodon microlepis Boulenger, 1906

= Haplotaxodon microlepis =

Species of fish

Haplotaxodon microlepis is a species of fish in the family Cichlidae. It is endemic to Lake Tanganyika in Burundi, the Democratic Republic of the Congo, Tanzania, and Zambia. The adults spend most of their time in the open waters of the lake, either solitarily or in pairs. They sometimes form schools near the shores where there are rocky shorelines. They feed on zooplankton. Both parents mouthbrood the young until the attain a total length of 2.34 centimetres (0.92 in).
