= Coelotilapia joka =

Conservation status
- Endangered (IUCN 3.1)

Scientific classification
- Kingdom: Animalia
- Phylum: Chordata
- Class: Actinopterygii
- Division: Teleostei
- Order: Cichliformes
- Family: Cichlidae
- Subfamily: Pseudocrenilabrinae
- Tribe: Coelotilapini
- Genus: Coelotilapia; Dunz & Schliewen, 2013
- Species: C. joka

Binomial name
- Coelotilapia joka (Thys van den Audenaerde, 1969)

Synonyms
- Tilapia joka Thys van den Audenaerde, 1969

Species of fish

Coelotilapia joka is a vulnerable species of cichlid fish from rivers in Sierra Leone and Liberia in West Africa. This relatively small tilapia formerly was included in the genus Tilapia, but in 2013 it was moved to its own genus Coelotilapia and tribe Coelotilapini.

It is an oval shaped fish with a black body coloring. Eight to nine yellow, transverse stripes mark the body. The head has small, irregular yellow lines that extend from the eye to the snout, forehead, and mouth.

== Characteristics ==
Coelotilapia joka can reach up to about 10 cm (4 in) in total length. It originates from West Africa; found near the banks of clear rivers and tributaries of the lower parts of the Moa and Moro Rivers, southern Sierra Leone and northern Liberia and lives from the middle to the bottom of the river. Males have an elongated anal and dorsal fins and, with age, have white tips on their fins. In the wild, its diet is mainly herbivorous with some live foods taken.

Pairs form monogamous bonds and later patriarch/matriarch families.

== Special interest for aquarists ==
Coelotilapia joka is a peaceful, calm species that does well when combined with fish that have a similar temperament and will do well if in a properly sized and maintained tank. The species requires frequent partial water changes and a pH from 6-7.5 at 73–77 °F (23–25 °C). While the species will breed in captivity, successful captive breeding is not common.
