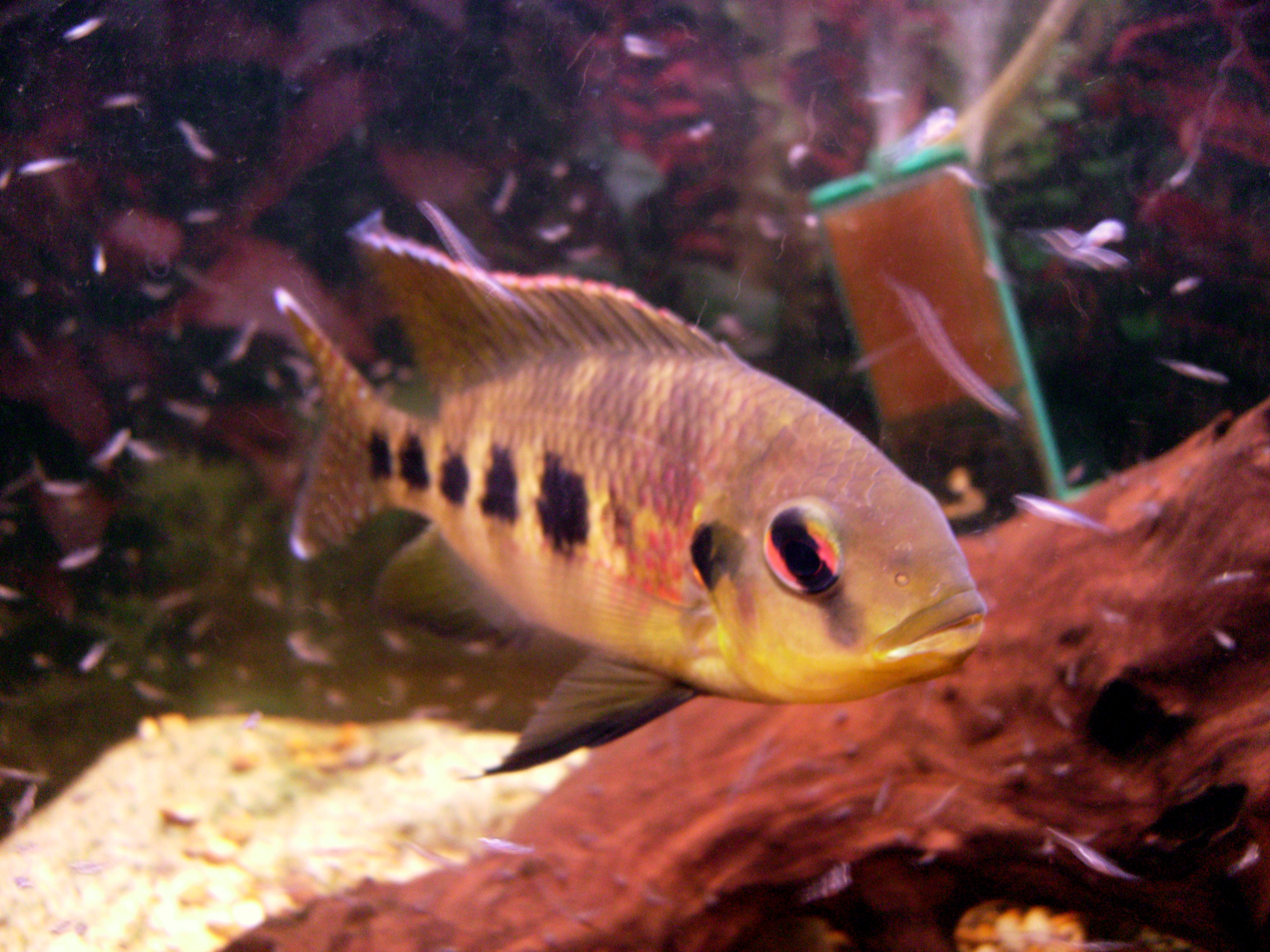
- Spotted Tilapia (P. mariae)

Scientific classification
- Kingdom: Animalia
- Phylum: Chordata
- Class: Actinopterygii
- Order: Cichliformes
- Family: Cichlidae
- Subfamily: Pseudocrenilabrinae
- Tribe: Pelmatolapiini; Dunz & Schliewen, 2013
- Genus: Pelmatolapia; Thys van den Audenaerde, 1969

Type species
- Tilapia mariae Boulenger, 1899

= Pelmatolapia =

Genus of fishes

Pelmatolapia is a genus of cichlids native to tropical Africa. This genus and Pterochromis are the only in the tribe Pelmatolapiini, but formerly they were included in Tilapiini.

== Species ==
There are currently two recognized species in this genus:

- Pelmatolapia cabrae (Boulenger, 1899)
- Pelmatolapia mariae (Boulenger, 1899) (Spotted Tilapia)
