= Gobiocichla =

Scientific classification
- Domain: Eukaryota
- Kingdom: Animalia
- Phylum: Chordata
- Class: Actinopterygii
- Order: Cichliformes
- Family: Cichlidae
- Tribe: Gobiocichlini
- Genus: Gobiocichla; Kanazawa, 1951

Type species
- Gobiocichla wonderi Kanazawa, 1951

Genus of fishes

Gobiocichla is a small genus of rheophilic cichlids native to the Cross (Manyu) and Niger Rivers in Africa.

== Species ==
There are currently two recognized species in this genus:

- Gobiocichla ethelwynnae T. R. Roberts, 1982
- Gobiocichla wonderi Kanazawa, 1951
