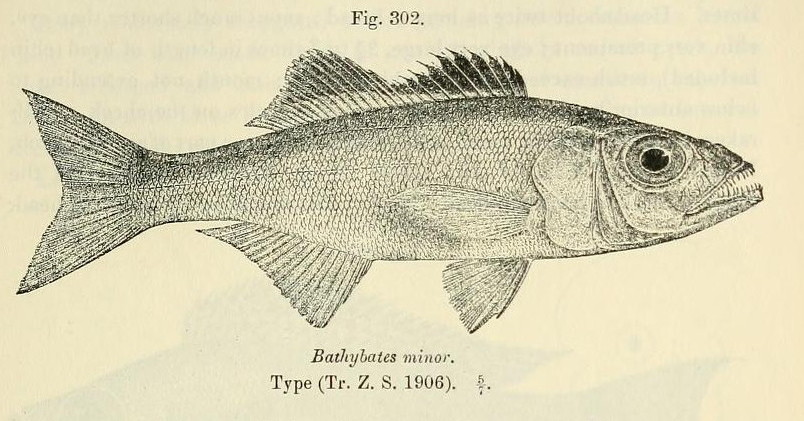

Conservation status
- Least Concern (IUCN 3.1)

Scientific classification
- Kingdom: Animalia
- Phylum: Chordata
- Class: Actinopterygii
- Order: Cichliformes
- Family: Cichlidae
- Genus: Bathybates
- Species: B. minor

Binomial name
- Bathybates minor Boulenger, 1906

= Bathybates minor =

Species of fish

Bathybates minor is a species of fish in the family Cichlidae. It is endemic to Lake Tanganyika where it forms schools and feeds mainly on clupeids, mostly Stolothrissa tanganicae.
