= Trematocara stigmaticum =

Conservation status
- Least Concern (IUCN 3.1)

Scientific classification
- Kingdom: Animalia
- Phylum: Chordata
- Class: Actinopterygii
- Order: Cichliformes
- Family: Cichlidae
- Genus: Trematocara
- Species: T. stigmaticum

Binomial name
- Trematocara stigmaticum Poll, 1943

Species of fish

Trematocara stigmaticum is a species of cichlid endemic to Lake Tanganyika. This species can reach a length of 7.5 centimetres (3.0 in) TL.
