= Benthochromis melanoides =

Conservation status
- Least Concern (IUCN 3.1)

Scientific classification
- Kingdom: Animalia
- Phylum: Chordata
- Class: Actinopterygii
- Order: Cichliformes
- Family: Cichlidae
- Genus: Benthochromis
- Species: B. melanoides

Binomial name
- Benthochromis melanoides (Poll, 1984)

Synonyms
- Haplotaxodon melanoides Poll, 1984

Species of fish

Benthochromis melanoides is a species of fish in the family Cichlidae. It is endemic to the deep waters of Lake Tanganyika, where it lives in deep water and feeds on plankton and crustaceans.
