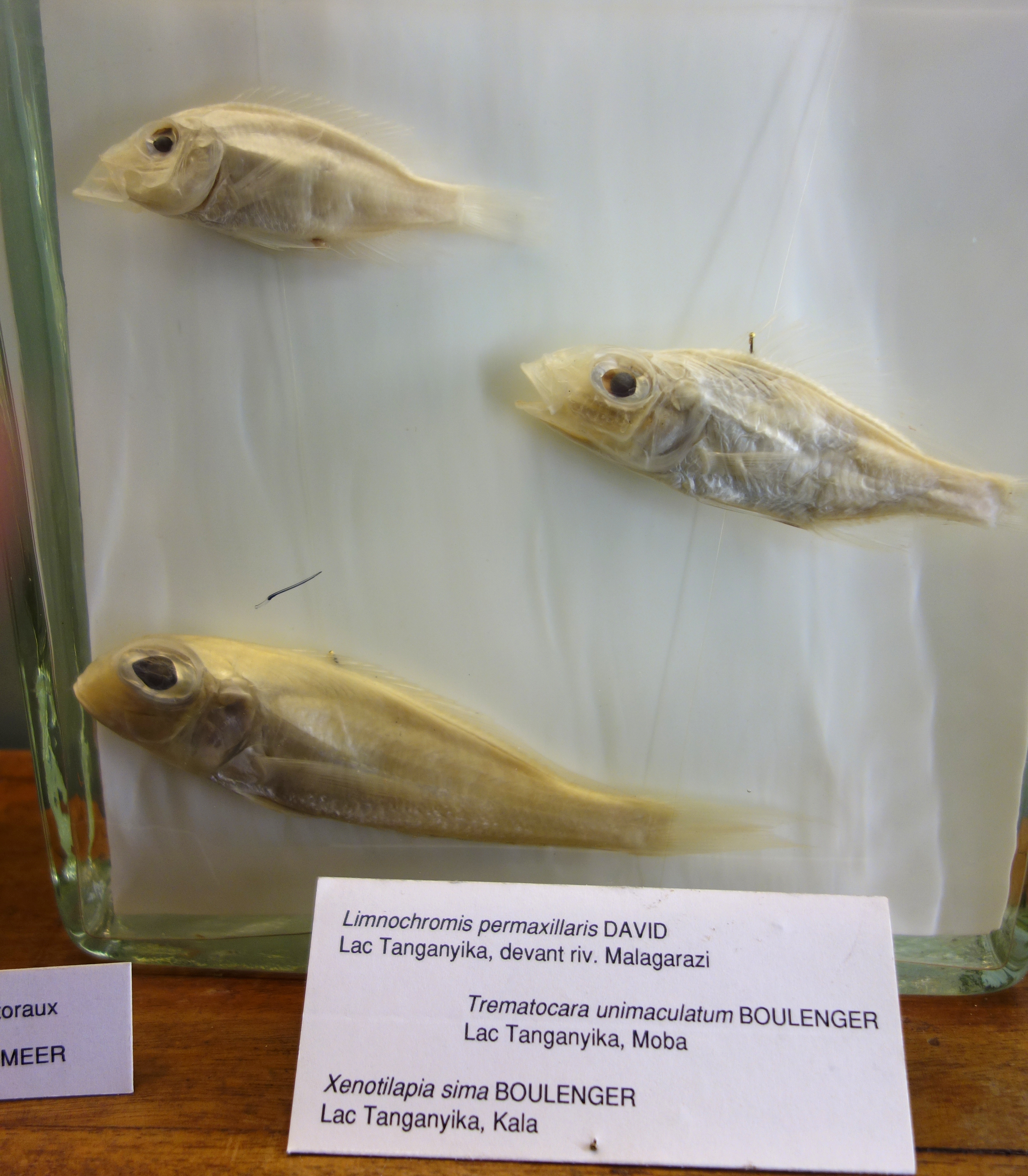
- Trematocara unimaculatum (middle)

Conservation status
- Least Concern (IUCN 3.1)

Scientific classification
- Kingdom: Animalia
- Phylum: Chordata
- Class: Actinopterygii
- Order: Cichliformes
- Family: Cichlidae
- Genus: Trematocara
- Species: T. unimaculatum

Binomial name
- Trematocara unimaculatum Boulenger, 1901

= Trematocara unimaculatum =

Species of fish

Trematocara unimaculatum is a species of cichlid endemic to Lake Tanganyika. This species can reach a length of 15 centimetres (5.9 in) TL.
