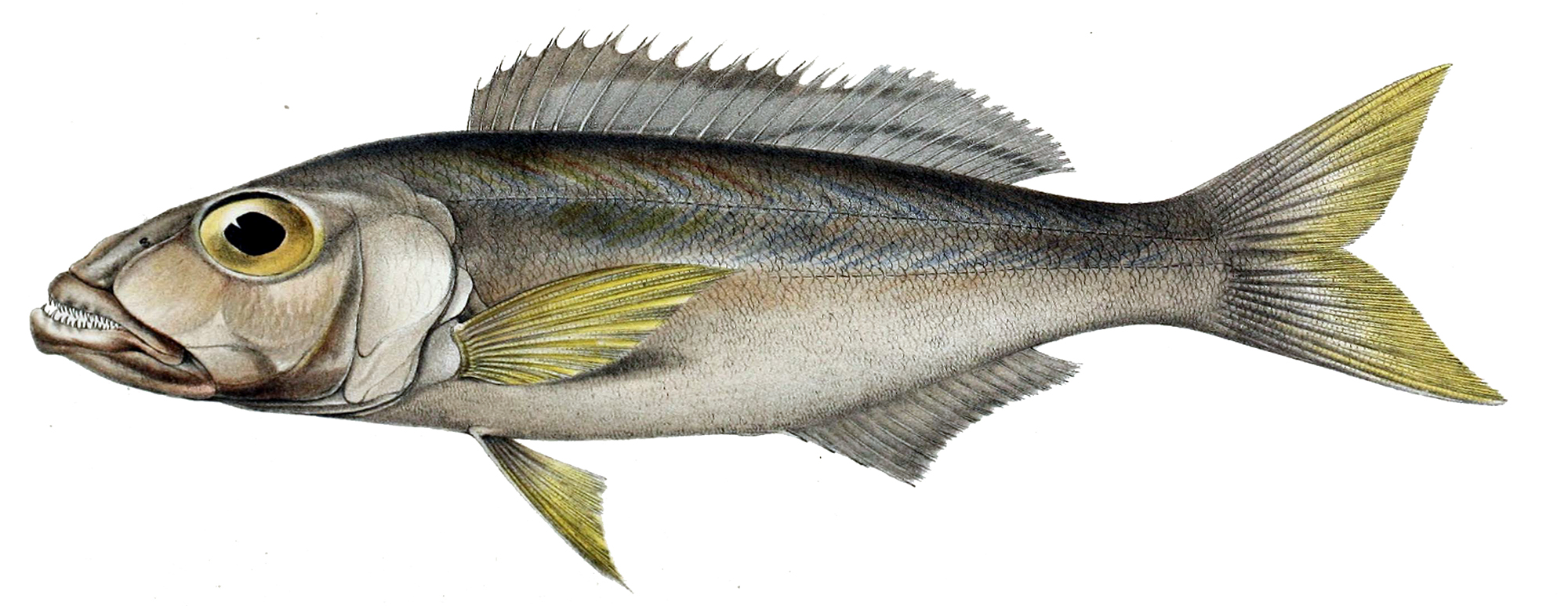
- Bathybates ferox

Scientific classification
- Kingdom: Animalia
- Phylum: Chordata
- Class: Actinopterygii
- Order: Cichliformes
- Family: Cichlidae
- Subfamily: Pseudocrenilabrinae
- Tribe: Bathybatini; Poll, 1986

Genera
- Bathybates Boulenger, 1898; Hemibates Regan, 1920; Trematocara Boulenger, 1899

= Bathybatini =

Tribe of fishes

Bathybatini is a tribe of cichlids endemic to Lake Tanganyika in Africa. They are mostly found in relatively deep waters and mainly feed on fish (Bathybates and Hemibates) or plankton (Trematocara). They are mouthbrooders.

This tribe is sometimes restricted to Bathybates, in which case Hemibates is in Hemibatini and Trematocara in Trematocarini.
