= Trematocara macrostoma =

Conservation status
- Least Concern (IUCN 3.1)

Scientific classification
- Kingdom: Animalia
- Phylum: Chordata
- Class: Actinopterygii
- Order: Cichliformes
- Family: Cichlidae
- Genus: Trematocara
- Species: T. macrostoma

Binomial name
- Trematocara macrostoma Poll, 1952

Synonyms
- Telotrematocara macrostoma (Poll, 1952)

Species of fish

Trematocara macrostoma is a species of cichlid endemic to Lake Tanganyika where it is known from the southern portion of the lake. This species can reach a length of 9.5 centimetres (3.7 in) SL.
