= Trematocara caparti =

Conservation status
- Least Concern (IUCN 3.1)

Scientific classification
- Kingdom: Animalia
- Phylum: Chordata
- Class: Actinopterygii
- Order: Cichliformes
- Family: Cichlidae
- Genus: Trematocara
- Species: T. caparti

Binomial name
- Trematocara caparti Poll, 1948

Species of fish

Trematocara caparti is a species of cichlid endemic to Lake Tanganyika. This species can reach a length of 6.7 centimetres (2.6 in) TL. This fish's specific name honours André Capart (1914-1991) the Belgian oceanographer who was a member of the Belgian Hydrobiological Mission to Lake Tanganyika in 1946 and 1947, during which type of this species was collected.
