= Eretmodus marksmithi =

Scientific classification
- Domain: Eukaryota
- Kingdom: Animalia
- Phylum: Chordata
- Class: Actinopterygii
- Order: Cichliformes
- Family: Cichlidae
- Genus: Eretmodus
- Species: E. marksmithi

Binomial name
- Eretmodus marksmithi Burgess, 2012

Species of fish

Eretmodus marksmithi is a small species of fish in the family Cichlidae. It is found in the northern third of Lake Tanganyika.
