= Trematocara zebra =

Conservation status
- Data Deficient (IUCN 3.1)

Scientific classification
- Kingdom: Animalia
- Phylum: Chordata
- Class: Actinopterygii
- Order: Cichliformes
- Family: Cichlidae
- Genus: Trematocara
- Species: T. zebra

Binomial name
- Trematocara zebra De Vos, Nshombo & Thys van den Audenaerde, 1996

Species of fish

Trematocara zebra is a species of cichlid endemic to Lake Tanganyika where it is known from rocky coasts of the northwestern coast of the lake. It is an inhabitant of the sublittoral zone. This species can reach a length of 6.9 centimetres (2.7 in) SL.
