= Trematocara kufferathi =

Conservation status
- Least Concern (IUCN 3.1)

Scientific classification
- Kingdom: Animalia
- Phylum: Chordata
- Class: Actinopterygii
- Order: Cichliformes
- Family: Cichlidae
- Genus: Trematocara
- Species: T. kufferathi

Binomial name
- Trematocara kufferathi Poll, 1948

Species of fish

Trematocara kufferathi is a species of cichlid endemic to Lake Tanganyika. This species can reach a length of 6.8 centimetres (2.7 in) TL. This fish's specific name honours the Belgian chemist Jean Kufferath, who was a member of the Belgian Hydrobiological Mission to Lake Tanganyika in 1946 and 1947, during which type of this species was collected.
