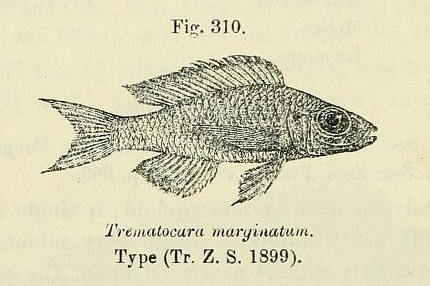

Conservation status
- Least Concern (IUCN 3.1)

Scientific classification
- Kingdom: Animalia
- Phylum: Chordata
- Class: Actinopterygii
- Order: Cichliformes
- Family: Cichlidae
- Genus: Trematocara
- Species: T. marginatum

Binomial name
- Trematocara marginatum Boulenger, 1899

= Trematocara marginatum =

Species of fish

Trematocara marginatum is a species of cichlid endemic to Lake Tanganyika. This species can reach a length of 9.8 centimetres (3.9 in) TL.
