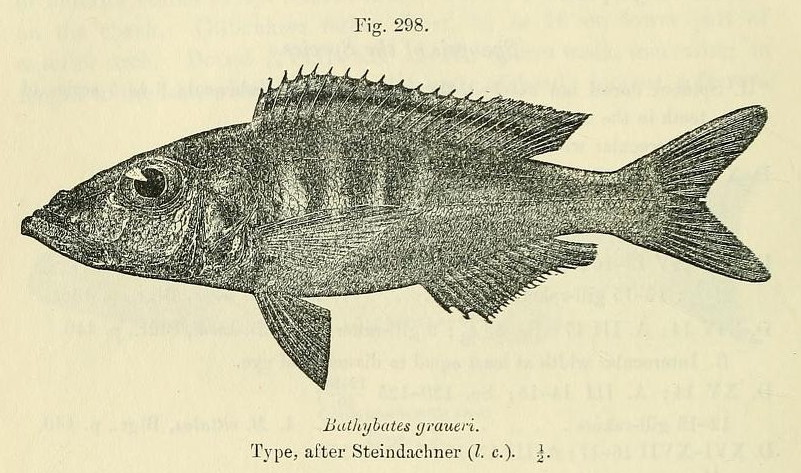

Conservation status
- Least Concern (IUCN 3.1)

Scientific classification
- Kingdom: Animalia
- Phylum: Chordata
- Class: Actinopterygii
- Order: Cichliformes
- Family: Cichlidae
- Genus: Bathybates
- Species: B. graueri

Binomial name
- Bathybates graueri Steindachner, 1911

= Bathybates graueri =

Species of fish

Bathybates graueri is a species of fish in the family Cichlidae. It is endemic to Lake Tanganyika where it forms schools and feeds mainly on clupeids. The specific name of this fish honours the Austrian explorer and zoologist Rudolf Grauer (1870-1927), who was the collector of the type.
