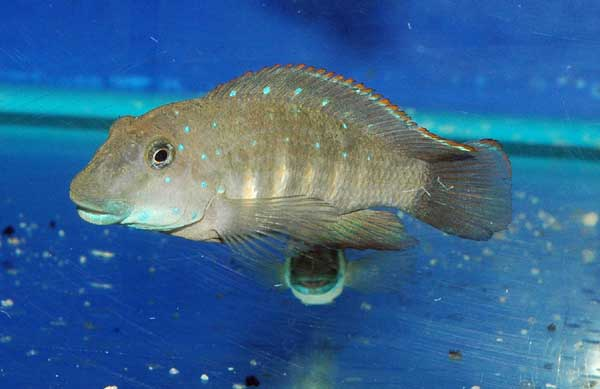
- Tanganyika clown, Eretmodus cyanostictus

Scientific classification
- Kingdom: Animalia
- Phylum: Chordata
- Class: Actinopterygii
- Order: Cichliformes
- Family: Cichlidae
- Subfamily: Pseudocrenilabrinae
- Tribe: Eretmodini poll, 1986

Genera
- 'see text

= Eretmodini =

Tribe of fishes

Eretmodini is a tribe of African cichlids. It contains five species of freshwater fish endemic to Lake Tanganyika. They are small fish with reduced swim bladders that are found near the bottom in the turbulent, coastal surf zone. They are mouthbrooders.

== Genera ==
There are three genera, consisting of five species in the tribe:

- Eretmodus Boulenger, 1898
- Spathodus Boulenger, 1900
- Tanganicodus Poll, 1950
