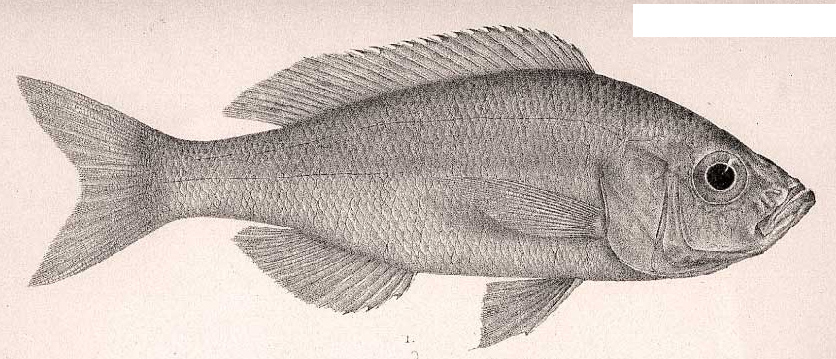
- Hemibates stenosoma

Scientific classification
- Kingdom: Animalia
- Phylum: Chordata
- Class: Actinopterygii
- Order: Cichliformes
- Family: Cichlidae
- Tribe: Bathybatini
- Genus: Hemibates; Regan, 1920

Type species
- Paratilapia stenosoma Boulenger, 1901

= Hemibates =

Genus of fishes

Hemibates is a genus of cichlid from the tribe Bathybatini of the subfamily Pseudocrenilabrinae. They are endemic to Lake Tanganyika. They are piscivorous. The genus was considered to be monospecific until the description of Hemibates koningsi in 2017. there is also at least one additional species in this genus, undescribed.

== Species ==
- Hemibates koningsi Schedel & Schliewen, 2017
- Hemibates stenosoma (Boulenger, 1901)
