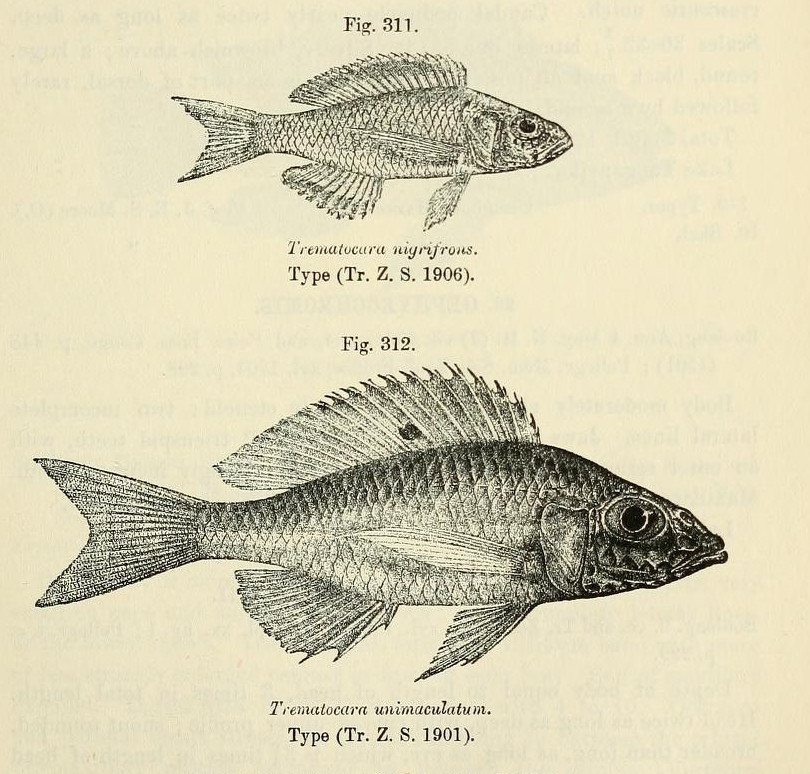
- top

Conservation status
- Least Concern (IUCN 3.1)

Scientific classification
- Kingdom: Animalia
- Phylum: Chordata
- Class: Actinopterygii
- Order: Cichliformes
- Family: Cichlidae
- Genus: Trematocara
- Species: T. nigrifrons

Binomial name
- Trematocara nigrifrons Boulenger, 1906

= Trematocara nigrifrons =

Species of fish

Trematocara nigrifrons is a species of cichlid endemic to Lake Tanganyika. This species can reach a length of 11.5 centimetres (4.5 in) TL.
