= Trematocara variabile =

Conservation status
- Least Concern (IUCN 3.1)

Scientific classification
- Kingdom: Animalia
- Phylum: Chordata
- Class: Actinopterygii
- Order: Cichliformes
- Family: Cichlidae
- Genus: Trematocara
- Species: T. variabile

Binomial name
- Trematocara variabile Poll, 1952

Species of fish

Trematocara variabile is a species of cichlid endemic to Lake Tanganyika. This species can reach a length of 8.7 centimetres (3.4 in) TL.
