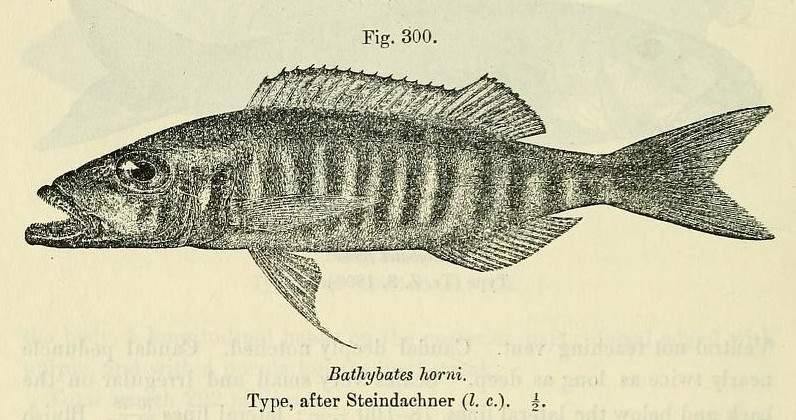

Conservation status
- Least Concern (IUCN 3.1)

Scientific classification
- Kingdom: Animalia
- Phylum: Chordata
- Class: Actinopterygii
- Order: Cichliformes
- Family: Cichlidae
- Genus: Bathybates
- Species: B. hornii

Binomial name
- Bathybates hornii Steindachner, 1911

= Bathybates hornii =

Species of fish

Bathybates hornii is a species of fish in the family Cichlidae. It is endemic to Lake Tanganyika where it forms schools and feeds mainly on clupeids. This species is apparently rather rare. It is little known and it is normally recorded from deep water during the day and moves towards the shorelines at night. The identity of the person honoured in this fish's specific name is uncertain but it is likely to be either, or both, of the Horn brothers, Adolf or Albin, who explored German East Africa and collected specimens for the Vienna Museum where the describer Franz Steindachner was curator of fishes.
