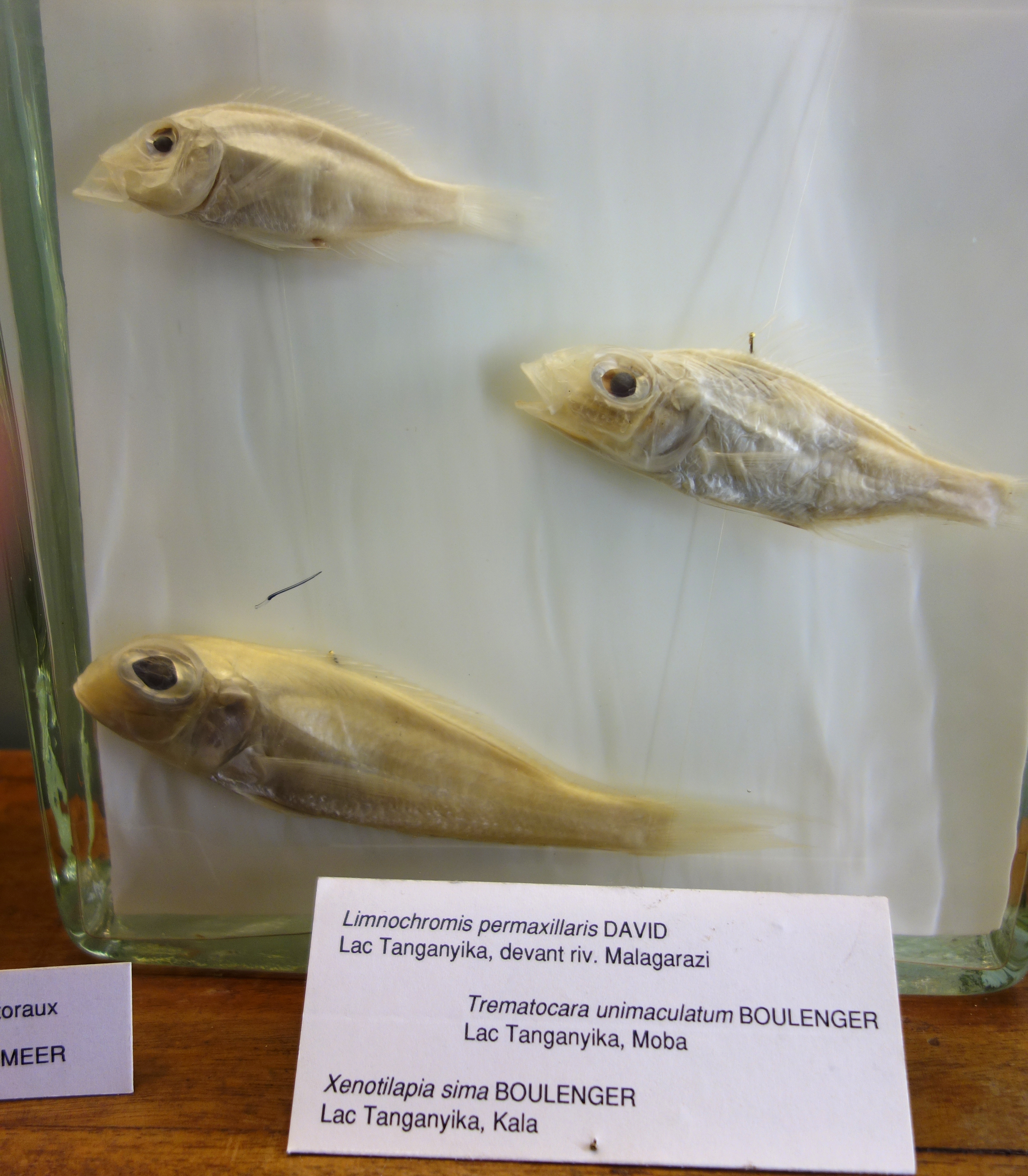
- Trematocara unimaculatum (middle)

Scientific classification
- Kingdom: Animalia
- Phylum: Chordata
- Class: Actinopterygii
- Order: Cichliformes
- Family: Cichlidae
- Tribe: Bathybatini
- Genus: Trematocara; Boulenger, 1899

Type species
- Trematocara marginatum Boulenger, 1899

Synonyms
- Telotrematocara Poll, 1986

= Trematocara =

Genus of fishes

Trematocara is a genus of cichlids endemic to Lake Tanganyika in Africa. They are relatively small, up to 15 cm (5.9 in) long, and slender in shape. These schooling, light-shy fish are typically found in relatively deep waters, but move closer to the surface at night to feed on plankton. They are mouthbrooders.

== Species ==
There are currently nine recognized species in this genus:

- Trematocara caparti Poll, 1948
- Trematocara kufferathi Poll, 1948
- Trematocara macrostoma Poll, 1952
- Trematocara marginatum Boulenger, 1899
- Trematocara nigrifrons Boulenger, 1906
- Trematocara stigmaticum Poll, 1943
- Trematocara unimaculatum Boulenger, 1901
- Trematocara variabile Poll, 1952
- Trematocara zebra De Vos, Nshombo & Thys van den Audenaerde, 1996
