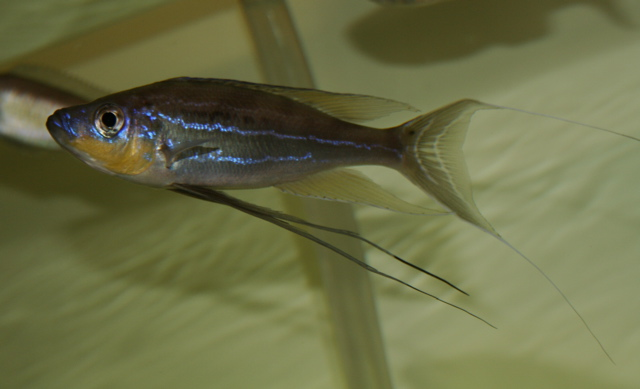
- Benthochromis horii

Scientific classification
- Domain: Eukaryota
- Kingdom: Animalia
- Phylum: Chordata
- Class: Actinopterygii
- Order: Cichliformes
- Family: Cichlidae
- Tribe: Benthochromini; Takahashi, 2003
- Genus: Benthochromis; Poll, 1986

Type species
- Haplotaxodon tricoti Poll, 1948

= Benthochromis =

Genus of fishes

Benthochromis is a small genus of planktivorous cichlid fish that are endemic to relatively deep waters in Lake Tanganyika in Africa.

== Species ==
There are currently three recognized species in this genus:

- Benthochromis horii T. Takahashi, 2008
- Benthochromis melanoides (Poll, 1984)
- Benthochromis tricoti (Poll, 1948)
