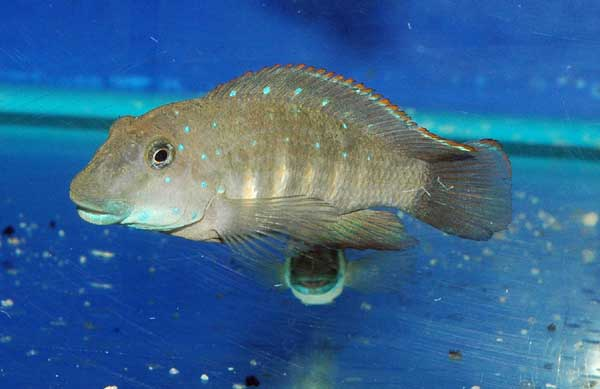
- Tanganyika Clown (E. cyanostictus)

Scientific classification
- Domain: Eukaryota
- Kingdom: Animalia
- Phylum: Chordata
- Class: Actinopterygii
- Order: Cichliformes
- Family: Cichlidae
- Tribe: Eretmodini
- Genus: Eretmodus; Boulenger, 1898

Type species
- Eretmodus cyanostictus Boulenger, 1898

= Eretmodus =

Genus of fishes

Eretmodus is a genus of cichlids endemic to Lake Tanganyika in East Africa.

== Species ==
There are currently two recognized species in this genus:

- Eretmodus cyanostictus Boulenger, 1898 (Tanganyika Clown)
- Eretmodus marksmithi W. E. Burgess, 2012
