= Tanganikallabes mortiauxi =

Conservation status
- Least Concern (IUCN 3.1)

Scientific classification
- Kingdom: Animalia
- Phylum: Chordata
- Class: Actinopterygii
- Order: Siluriformes
- Family: Clariidae
- Genus: Tanganikallabes
- Species: T. mortiauxi

Binomial name
- Tanganikallabes mortiauxi Poll, 1943

Species of fish

Tanganikallabes mortiauxi is a species of airbreathing catfish found in Burundi, the Democratic Republic of the Congo, Tanzania, and Zambia. This species grows to about 33 centimetres (13 in) TL. It is found among stones on rocky shores of lakes.
