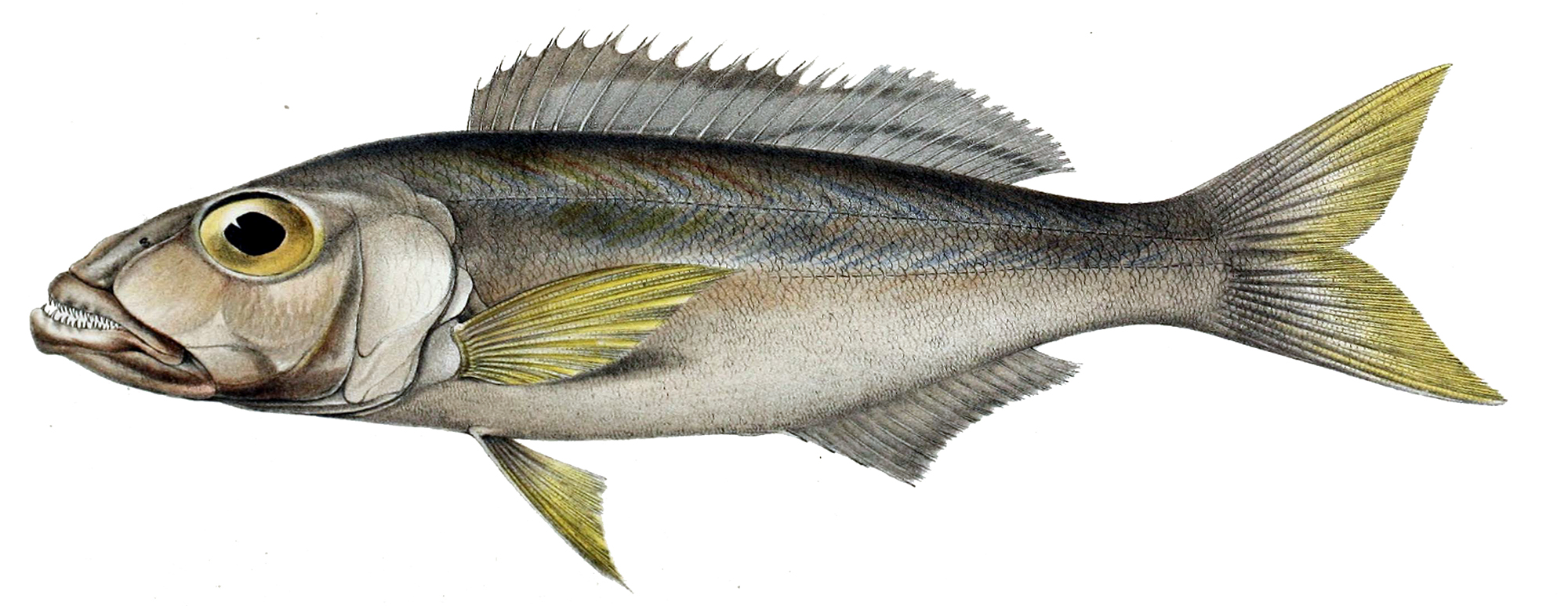
- Bathybates ferox

Scientific classification
- Kingdom: Animalia
- Phylum: Chordata
- Class: Actinopterygii
- Order: Cichliformes
- Family: Cichlidae
- Tribe: Bathybatini
- Genus: Bathybates; Boulenger, 1898

Type species
- Bathybates ferox Boulenger, 1898

= Bathybates =

Genus of fishes

Bathybates is a genus of piscivorous cichlids endemic to Lake Tanganyika in East Africa. The genus includes both pelagic species that mainly feed on Tanganyika sardines and benthic species that mainly feed on other cichlids. They are some of the deepest-living cichlids, regularly occurring down to 200 m (660 ft).

They are elongated in shape with a silvery color and a dark spotted or striped pattern. Depending on the species involved, they reach lengths of up to 20.5 to 42 cm (8–16.5 in).

Although not closely related, they have sometimes been compared to piscivorous Rhamphochromis cichlids of Lake Malawi.

== Species ==
There are currently seven recognized species in this genus:

- Bathybates fasciatus Boulenger, 1901
- Bathybates ferox Boulenger, 1898
- Bathybates graueri Steindachner, 1911
- Bathybates hornii Steindachner, 1911
- Bathybates leo Poll, 1956
- Bathybates minor Boulenger, 1906
- Bathybates vittatus Boulenger, 1914
