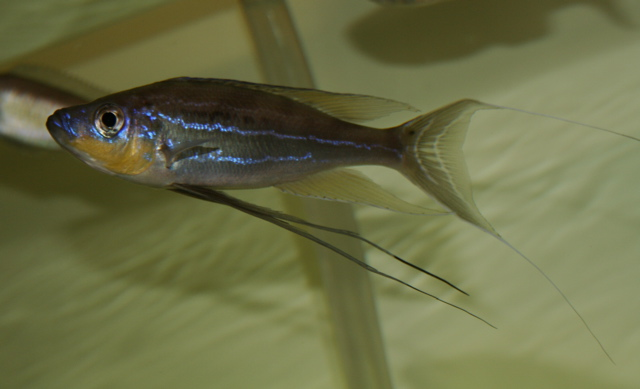
- Benthochromis horii (a species that was confused with B. tricoti until 2008)

Conservation status
- Least Concern (IUCN 3.1)

Scientific classification
- Kingdom: Animalia
- Phylum: Chordata
- Class: Actinopterygii
- Order: Cichliformes
- Family: Cichlidae
- Genus: Benthochromis
- Species: B. tricoti

Binomial name
- Benthochromis tricoti (Poll, 1948)

Synonyms
- Haplotaxodon tricoti Poll, 1948

= Benthochromis tricoti =

Species of fish

Benthochromis tricoti is a species of fish in the cichlid family. It is endemic to Lake Tanganyika in Africa and lives at depths of up to 100 m (330 ft). It feeds on small crustaceans and plankton. It reaches a maximum length of 16.5 cm (6.5 in). Like many other cichlids, it is a mouthbrooder.

"B. tricoti" seen in the aquarium trade are actually B. horii, a species only scientifically described in 2008.

The specific name of this fish honours a Monsieur Tricot, of the Great Lakes Railroad Company in Albertville, for the interest and concern he showed for the Belgian Hydrobiological Mission to Lake Tanganyika during 1946–1947, which collected the type.
