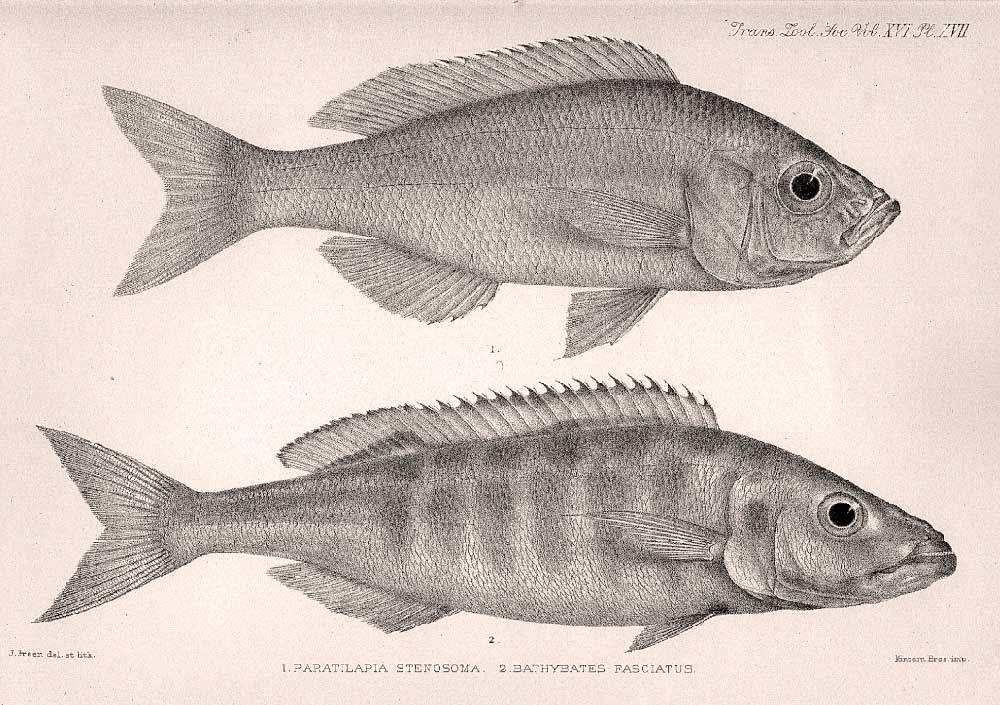
- Hemibates stenosoma (above) and Bathybates fasciatus (below)

Conservation status
- Least Concern (IUCN 3.1)

Scientific classification
- Kingdom: Animalia
- Phylum: Chordata
- Class: Actinopterygii
- Order: Cichliformes
- Family: Cichlidae
- Genus: Hemibates; Regan, 1920
- Species: H. stenosoma

Binomial name
- Hemibates stenosoma (Boulenger, 1901)

Synonyms
- Paratilapia stenosoma Boulenger, 1901

= Hemibates stenosoma =

Species of fish

Hemibates stenosoma is a species of cichlid endemic to Lake Tanganyika in East Africa. It is generally most numerous at depths between 80 and 200 m (260–660 ft), but performs a seasonal migration to inshore regions when it can occur as shallow as 20 m (65 ft). It is predatory, feeding on fish and prawns, and grows to a total length of 30 cm (1 ft). This species was formerly regarded as the only formally described member of its genus., however, another species, Hemibates koningsi, which was formerly referred to as Hemibates sp. "stenosoma chituta" before its formal description.
