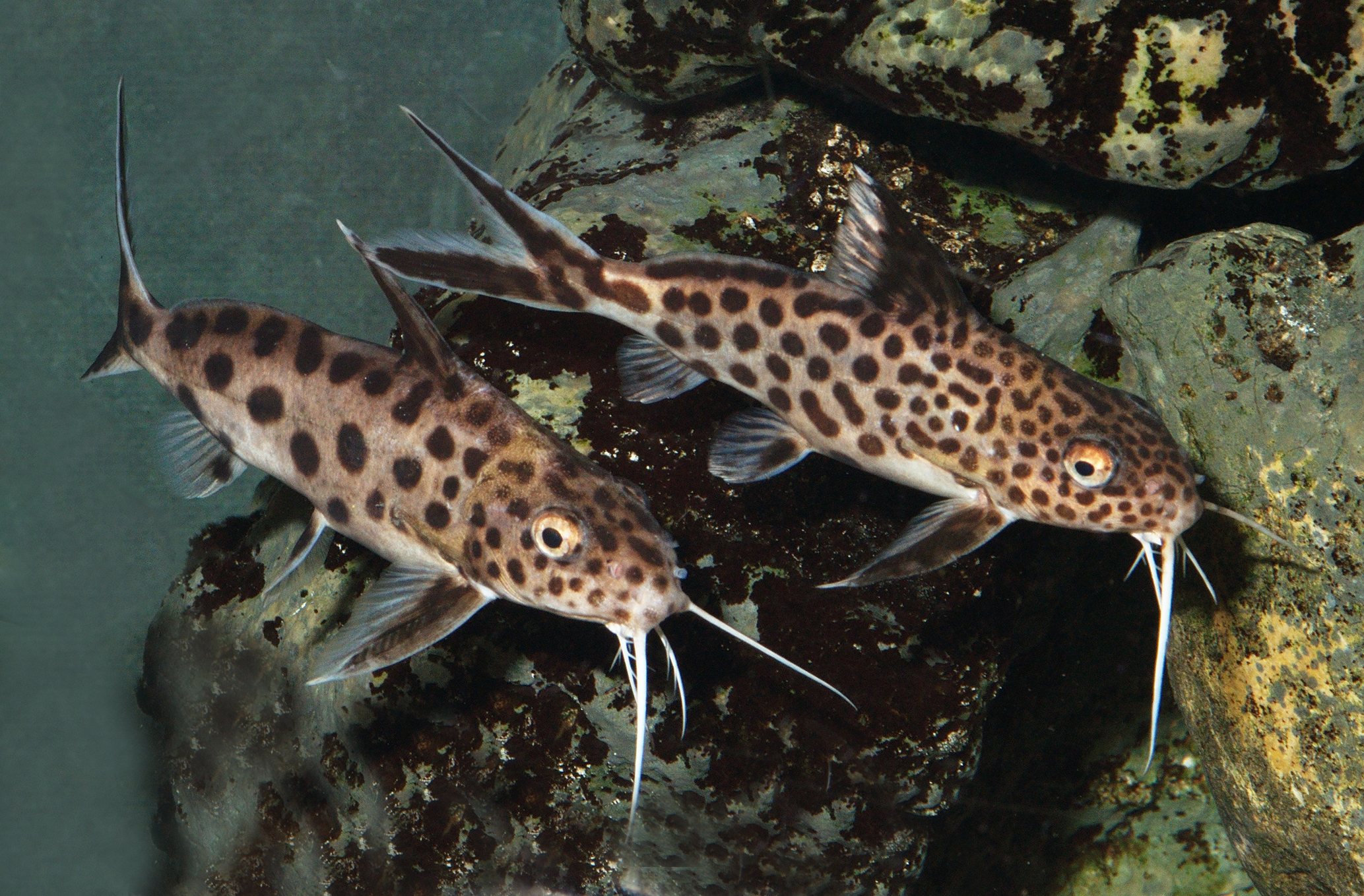

Scientific classification
- Kingdom: Animalia
- Phylum: Chordata
- Class: Actinopterygii
- Division: Teleostei
- Order: Siluriformes
- Family: Mochokidae
- Genus: Synodontis
- Species: S. grandiops

Binomial name
- Synodontis grandiops Wright & Page, 2006

= Synodontis grandiops =

Species of fish

Synodontis grandiops is a species of upside-down catfish endemic to the Democratic Republic of the Congo, Burundi, and Tanzania, where it is only known from Lake Tanganyika. It was first described by Jeremy John Wright and Lawrence M. Page in 2006, from specimens collected at multiple points along the shore of Lake Tanganyika. The species name is a Latinized combination of the Latin "grandi", meaning large or big, and the Greek "ops", meaning eye, a reference to the relatively large eyes of this fish.

== Description ==
Like all members of the genus Synodontis, S. grandiops has a strong, bony head capsule that extends back as far as the first spine of the dorsal fin. The head is about 3/10 of the standard length of the fish. The head contains a distinct narrow, bony external protrusion called a humeral process. The shape and size of the humeral process help to identify the species. In S. grandiops, the humeral process is narrow, long, and rough in appearance, and contains a distinct ridge on the bottom surface. The top edge is convex and it ends in a sharp point. It is almost 6/10 of the length of the head. The eyes are large, about 3/10 of the length of the head.

The fish has three pairs of barbels. The maxillary barbels are located on the upper jaw, and two pairs of mandibular barbels are on the lower jaw. The maxillary barbel does not have a membrane near the base and is straight without any branches. It extends at least as far as the base of the pectoral fin, most of the length of the head. The outer pair of mandibular barbels extends just short of the pectoral girdle, about 1/2 of the length of the head, and contains four to five branches without secondary branches. The inner pair of mandibular barbels is about 1/2 to 2/3 as long as the outer pair, about 1/4 to 1/3 of the length of the head, with four to five pairs of branches without secondary branches.

The skin of S. grandiops has a large number of tiny vertical skin folds. The exact purpose of the skin folds is not known, but is a characteristic of the species of Syndontis that are endemic to Lake Tanganyika. External granular papilla are not present.

The front edges of the dorsal fins and the pectoral fins of Syntontis species are hardened into stiff spines. In S. grandiops, the spine of the dorsal fin is long, about 7/10 as long as the head, is almost completely straight, contains up to three small serrations on the front and many small serrations on the back, and ends with short, white filaments. The remaining portion of the dorsal fin is made up of seven branching rays. The spine of the pectoral fin is slightly curved, roughly as long as the dorsal fin spine, with large serrations on both sides. The pectoral spine ends in short, white filaments. The other pectoral fins are made up of eight branching rays. The adipose fin is short, does not contain any rays, and has a convex shape. The pelvic fin contains one unbranched and six branched rays. The pelvic fin is vertically aligned in front of the adipose fin. The anal fin contains three to four unbranched and six to eight branched rays; it is vertically aligned with the adipose fin. The tail, or caudal fin, is forked, with pointed lobes, and contains seven rays on the upper lobe, eight rays on the lower lobe.

The mouth of the fish faces downward and has wide lips that contain papilla. All members of Syndontis have a structure called a premaxillary toothpad, which is located on the very front of the upper jaw of the mouth. This structure contains several rows of short, chisel-shaped teeth. In some species, this toothpad is made up of a large patch with several rows in a large cluster. In other species of Syndontis, this toothpad is clearly divided into two separate groups, separated by a thin band of skin that divides the toothpad. This character is used as a method of differentiating between to different but similar species of Syndontis. In S. grandiops, the toothpad is uninterrupted, or continuous without a break. On the lower jaw, or mandible, the teeth of Syndontis are attached to flexible, stalk-like structures and described as "s-shaped" or "hooked". The number of teeth on the mandible is used to differentiate between species; in S. grandiops, there are 17-26 teeth on the mandible, arranged in a single row.

Some of the species of Synodontis have an opening or series of openings called the axillary pore. It is located on the side of the body below the humeral process and before the pectoral fin spine. The exact function of the port is not known to scientists, although its presence has been observed in seven other catfish genera. Fish in the genus Acrochordonichthys have been observed to secrete a mucus with toxic properties from their axillary pore, but there is no scientific consensus as to the exact purpose of the secretion or the pore. S. grandiops has a large, dark-colored axillary pore just below the humeral process.

S. grandiops shares the characteristic of most of the Synodontis species of Lake Tanganyika by having a recognizable pattern consisting of dark triangles at the bases of all of the rayed fins, except the anal and pelvic fins which are white, and dark spots on the body that may or may not extend to the belly. The body ranges from light brown to beige, becoming darker on the head and back. The barbels are white, the dorsal and pectoral fin spines are brown to black.

The maximum standard length of known specimens is 11 centimetres (4.3 in) and a total length of 15 centimetres (5.9 in). In general in Synodontis species, females tend to be slightly larger than males of the same age.

== Habitat and behavior ==
In the wild, the species is endemic to Lake Tanganyika, which has a temperature range of 23 to 26 °C (73 to 79 °F), and an approximate pH of 8.5 – 9, and a dH range of 4-15. Synodontis species in the lake tend to inhabit mainly the rocky shoreline areas, as well as sandy and shell-covered bottom areas. The reproductive habits of most of the species of Synodontis are not known, beyond some instances of obtaining egg counts from gravid females. Spawning likely occurs during the flooding season between July and October, and pairs swim in unison during spawning. As a whole, species of Synodontis are omnivores, consuming insect larvae, algae, gastropods, bivalves, sponges, crustaceans, and the eggs of other fishes. The growth rate is rapid in the first year, then slows down as the fish age. They practice brood parasitism.They lives among rock piles frequented by various species of mauna: small African cichlids. Courtship behaviour culminates with the female sucking sperm from the male's cloaca. She brings the sperm through her digestive tract to her cloaca, where her eggs meet the sperm. She then rushes into the nest of a cichlid, devours the eggs of cichlids, and deposits her own. The cichlids then raise the catfish as their own.
