= Tanganikallabes =

Scientific classification
- Domain: Eukaryota
- Kingdom: Animalia
- Phylum: Chordata
- Class: Actinopterygii
- Order: Siluriformes
- Family: Clariidae
- Genus: Tanganikallabes; Poll, 1943

Type species
- Tanganikallabes mortiauxi Poll, 1943

Genus of fishes

Tanganikallabes is a genus of airbreathing catfishes that are endemic to Lake Tanganyika in East Africa.

== Species ==
There are currently three recognized species in this genus:

- Tanganikallabes alboperca J. J. Wright & R. M. Bailey, 2012
- Tanganikallabes mortiauxi Poll, 1943
- Tanganikallabes stewarti J. J. Wright & R. M. Bailey, 2012
