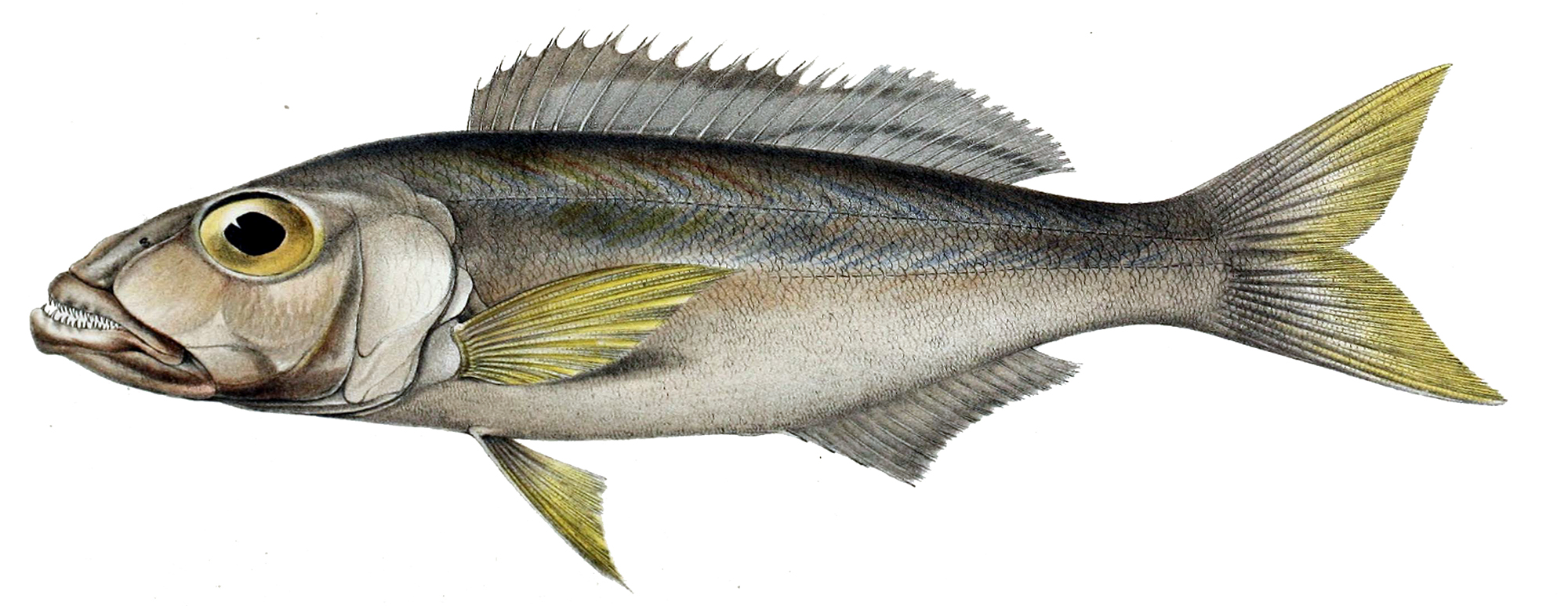

Conservation status
- Least Concern (IUCN 3.1)

Scientific classification
- Kingdom: Animalia
- Phylum: Chordata
- Class: Actinopterygii
- Order: Cichliformes
- Family: Cichlidae
- Genus: Bathybates
- Species: B. ferox

Binomial name
- Bathybates ferox Boulenger, 1898

= Bathybates ferox =

Species of fish

Bathybates ferox is a species of fish in the family Cichlidae. It is found in Burundi, the Democratic Republic of the Congo, Tanzania, and Zambia. Its natural habitat is Lake Tanganyika where it lives in shallow water and is exclusively piscivorous. The IUCN has assessed it as being a "least-concern species".

== Description ==
Bathybates ferox is a fairly deep-bodied cichlid with a silvery body with blue markings. The mouth is large and the teeth are sharp and conical. The maximum total length of this fish is about 15 in (38 cm).

== Distribution ==
Bathybates ferox is endemic to Lake Tanganyika, being found in the Democratic Republic of Congo, Burundi, Tanzania and Zambia. It is sometimes found in the aquarium industry where it is considered very passive and easy to keep if maintained to themselves and with very few to no decorations in the aquarium. It does best in very hard water with a pH of 8.6 and a temperature of about 78 °F (25.56 °C).

== Ecology ==
Bathybates ferox is a piscivore, chasing and feeding on smaller fish. Like other cichlids, Bathybates ferox is a mouth-brooder. The eggs, with a diameter of 8.5 mm (0.33 in), are some of the largest in the family Cichlidae.

== Status ==
Bathybates ferox is found only in Lake Tanganyika where it is described as widespread and abundant. It is a benthic species living in warm shallow water, possibly at depths down to about 70 m (230 ft). No specific threats have been identified, and the main threats it faces are from the lowering of the water quality due to pollution, disturbance to the habitat and over-fishing. The International Union for Conservation of Nature has classified the conservation status of this fish as being of "least concern".
