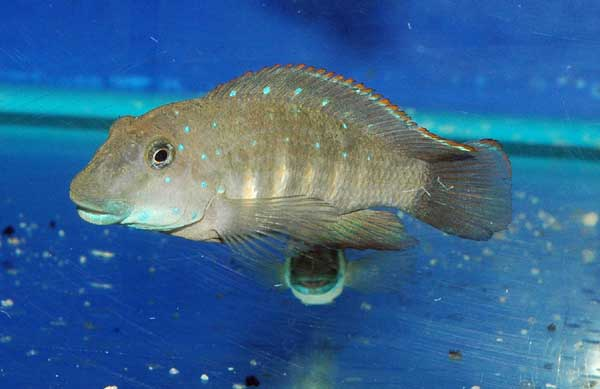

Conservation status
- Near Threatened (IUCN 3.1)

Scientific classification
- Kingdom: Animalia
- Phylum: Chordata
- Class: Actinopterygii
- Order: Cichliformes
- Family: Cichlidae
- Genus: Eretmodus
- Species: E. cyanostictus

Binomial name
- Eretmodus cyanostictus Boulenger,1898

= Tanganyika clown =

Species of fish

The Tanganyika clown (Eretmodus cyanostictus), also known as the striped goby cichlid, is a small species of fish in the family Cichlidae. It is found in the Tanzanian and Zambian shorelines of Lake Tanganyika.
