= Lake Tanganyika =

Rift lake in East-Central Africa

- Ikiyaga ca Tanganyika (Kirundi); Ziwa Tanganyika (Swahili)
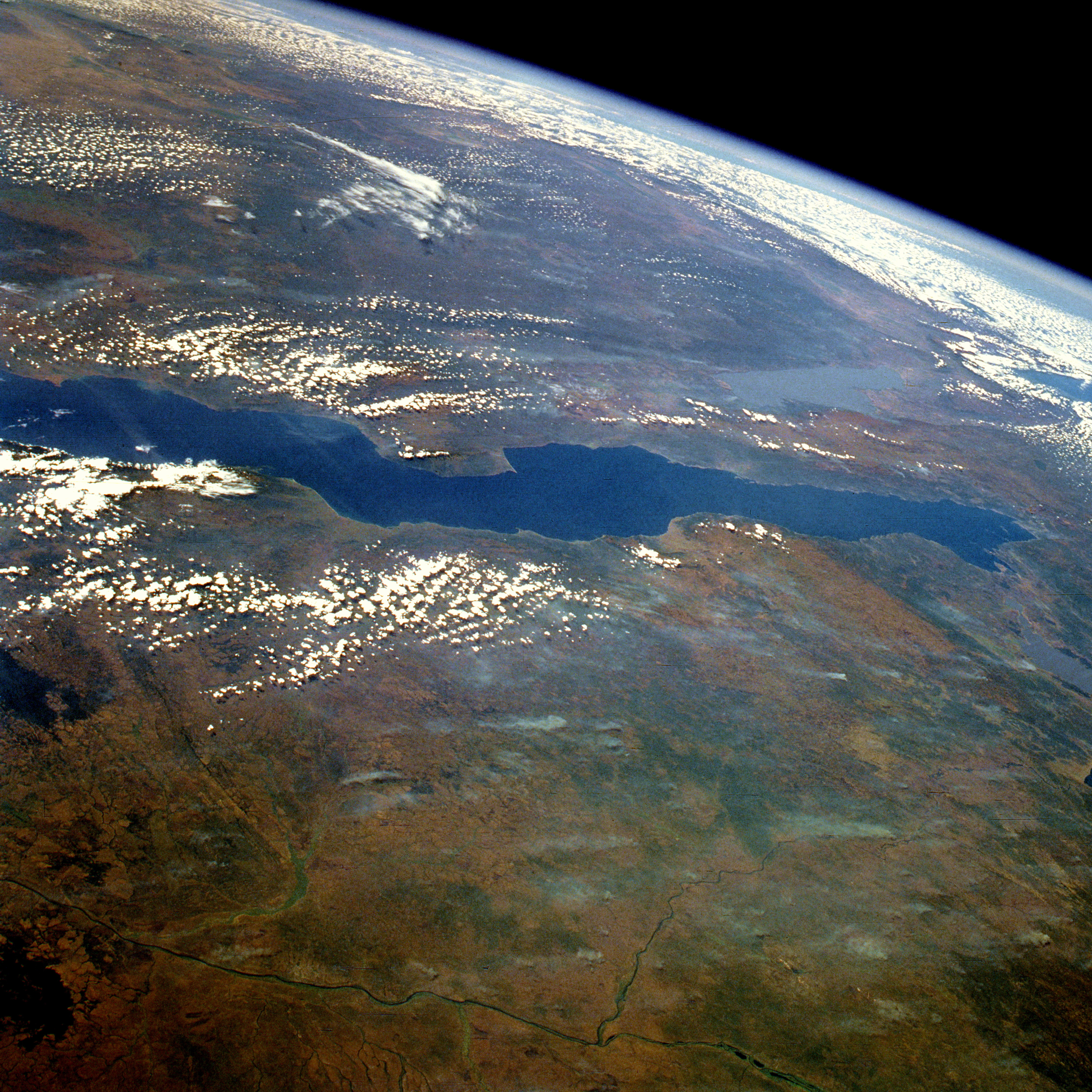
- Lake Tanganyika from space, June 1985

- Location within Africa

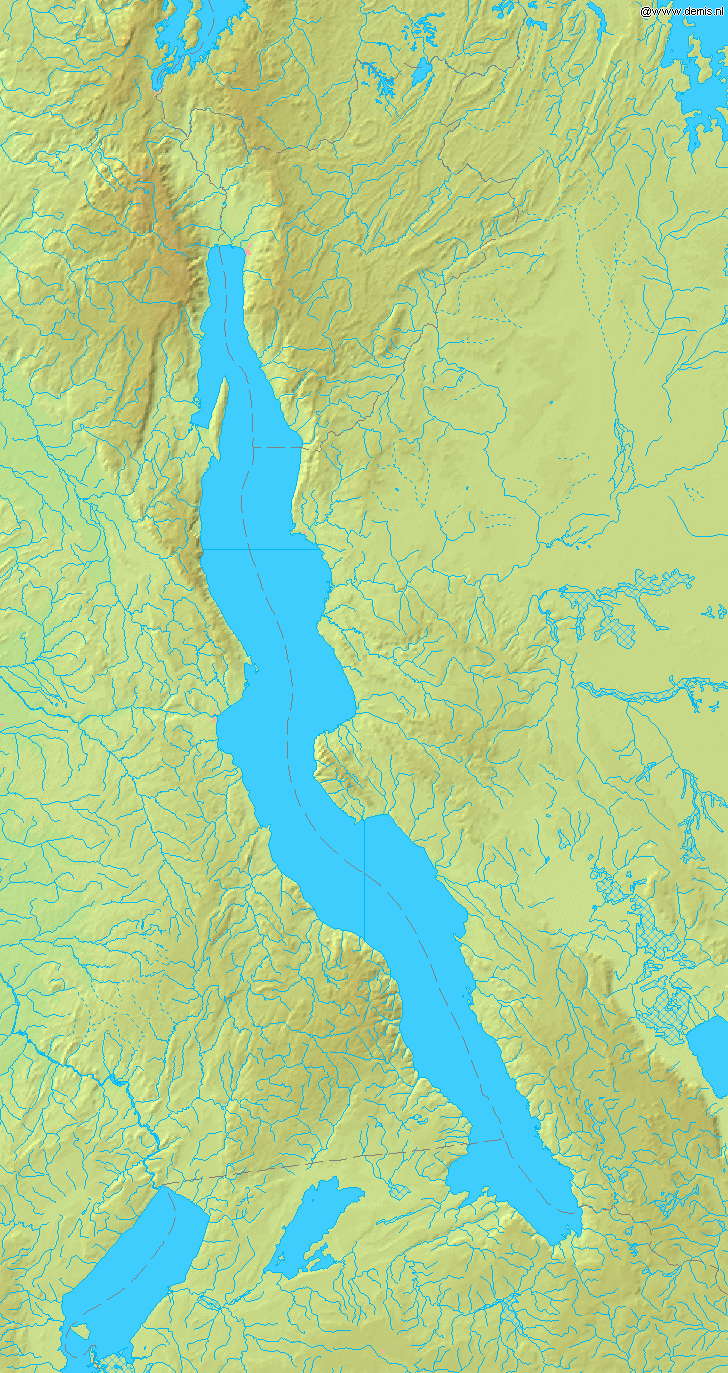
- Lake Tanganyika map
- Coordinates: 6°06′S 29°30′E
- Lake type: Ancient lake, Rift Valley Lake
- Primary inflows: Ruzizi River; Malagarasi River; Lufubu River
- Primary outflows: Lukuga River
- Catchment area: 231,000 km^{2} (89,000 sq mi)
- Basin countries: Burundi, DR Congo, Tanzania, and Zambia
- Max. length: 673 km (418 mi)
- Max. width: 72 km (45 mi)
- Surface area: 32,900 km^{2} (12,700 sq mi)
- Average depth: 570 m (1,870 ft)
- Max. depth: 1,470 m (4,820 ft)
- Water volume: 18,750 km^{3} (4,500 cu mi)
- Residence time: 5500 years
- Shore length^{1}: 1,828 km (1,136 mi)
- Surface elevation: 773 m (2,536 ft)
- Settlements: Kigoma, Tanzania; Rukwa, Tanzania; Kalemie, the DRC; Bujumbura, Burundi; Mpulungu, Zambia

Ramsar Wetland
- Official name: Tanganyika
- Designated: 2 February 2007
- Reference no.: 1671
- ^{1} Shore length is not a well-defined measure.

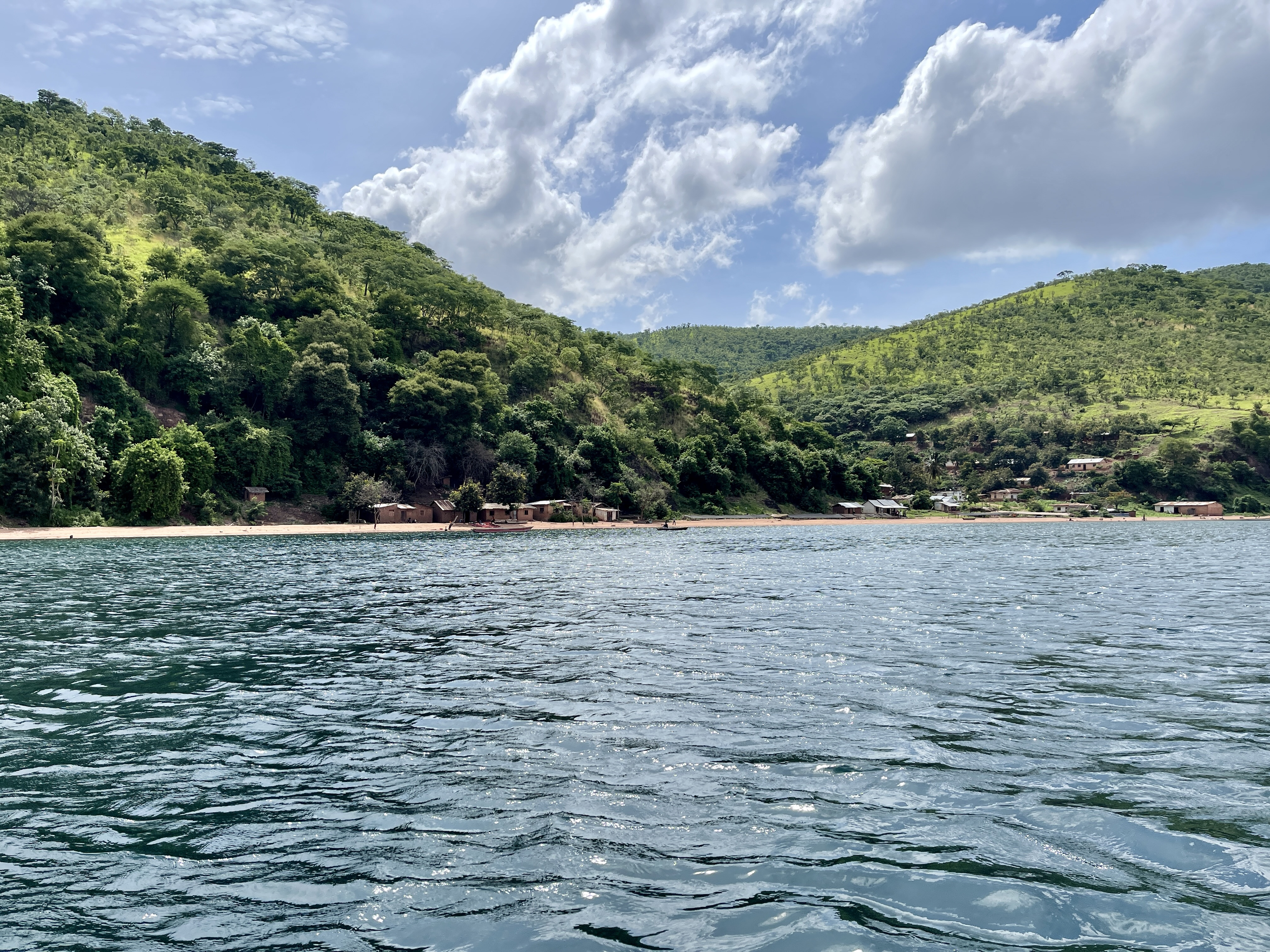
Lake Tanganyika eastern shore in Kagongo Ward, Kigoma Region, Tanzania

Lake Tanganyika (/ˌtæŋɡənˈjiːkə, -ɡæn-/ TANG-gən-YEE-kə, -gan-; Kirundi: Ikiyaga ca Tanganyika) is an African Great Lake. It is the world's second-largest freshwater lake by volume and the second deepest, in both cases after Lake Baikal in Siberia. It is the world's longest freshwater lake. It is also the 6th largest lake by area. The lake is shared among four countries—Tanzania, the Democratic Republic of the Congo (the DRC), Burundi, and Zambia—with Tanzania (46%) and the DRC (40%) possessing the majority of the lake. It drains via the Lukuga River into the Congo River system, which ultimately discharges at Banana, Democratic Republic of the Congo into the Atlantic Ocean.

== Geography ==
Lake Tanganyika is an ancient lake, one of only twenty more than a million years old. Its three basins, which in periods with lower water levels were separate lakes, are of different ages. The central lake began to form 9–12 million years ago (Mya), the northern 7–8 Mya and the southern 2–4 Mya.

Today Lake Tanganyika is situated within the Albertine Rift, the western branch of the East African Rift, and is confined by the mountainous walls of the valley. It is the largest rift lake in Africa and the second-largest freshwater lake by volume in the world. It is the deepest lake in Africa and holds the greatest volume of fresh water on the continent, accounting for 16% of the world's available fresh water. It extends for 676 km (420 mi) in a general north–south direction and averages 50 km (31 mi) in width. The lake covers 32,000 km^{2} (12,000 sq mi), with a shoreline of 1,900 km (1,200 mi), a mean depth of 572 m (1,877 ft) and a maximum depth of 1,471 m (4,826 ft) (in the northern basin). It holds an estimated 18,750 km^{3} (4,500 cu mi) of water.

The catchment area of the lake is 231,000 km^{2} (89,000 mi^{2}). Two main rivers flow into the lake, as well as numerous smaller rivers and streams (whose lengths are limited by the steep mountains around the lake). The one major outflow is the Lukuga River, which empties into the Congo River drainage. Precipitation and evaporation play a greater role than the rivers. At least 90% of the water influx is from rain falling on the lake's surface and at least 90% of the water loss is from direct evaporation.

The major river flowing into the lake is the Ruzizi River, formed about 10,000 years ago, which enters the north of the lake from Lake Kivu. The Malagarasi River, which is Tanzania's second largest river, enters the east side of Lake Tanganyika. The Malagarasi is older than Lake Tanganyika, and before the lake was formed, it probably was a headwater of the Lualaba River, the main Congo River headstream. The major river flowing into the lake from Zambia and the largest discharging into the southern lake is the Lufubu, which rises on the plateau south of the lake, flowing northwest over an escarpment into a valley, then flowing northeast to a mouth east of Nsumbu.

The lake has a complex history of changing flow patterns, due to its high altitude, great depth, slow rate of refill, and mountainous location in a turbulently volcanic area that has undergone climate changes. Apparently, in the past it has rarely had an outflow to the sea. It has been described as "practically endorheic" for this reason. The lake's connection to the sea is dependent on a high water level allowing overflow out of the lake through the Lukuga River into the Congo. When not overflowing, the lake's exit into the Lukuga River is blocked by sand bars and masses of weed, and instead this river depends on its own tributaries, especially the Niemba River, to maintain a flow.

Since the 1990s the water level in Lake Tanganyika has risen by about 2 metres, flooding homes and structures along low-lying shores. This is particularly visible in the town of Nsumbu, Zambia, along the shoreline between the jetty and the mouth of the Chisala River, nearly 2 km to the northwest. Between 2018 and 2024 the water has penetrated part of the town up to 300 m from the previous shoreline.

The lake may also have had at times different inflows and outflows; inward flows from a higher Lake Rukwa, access to Lake Malawi and an exit route to the Nile have all been proposed to have existed at some point in the lake's history.

== Water characteristics ==
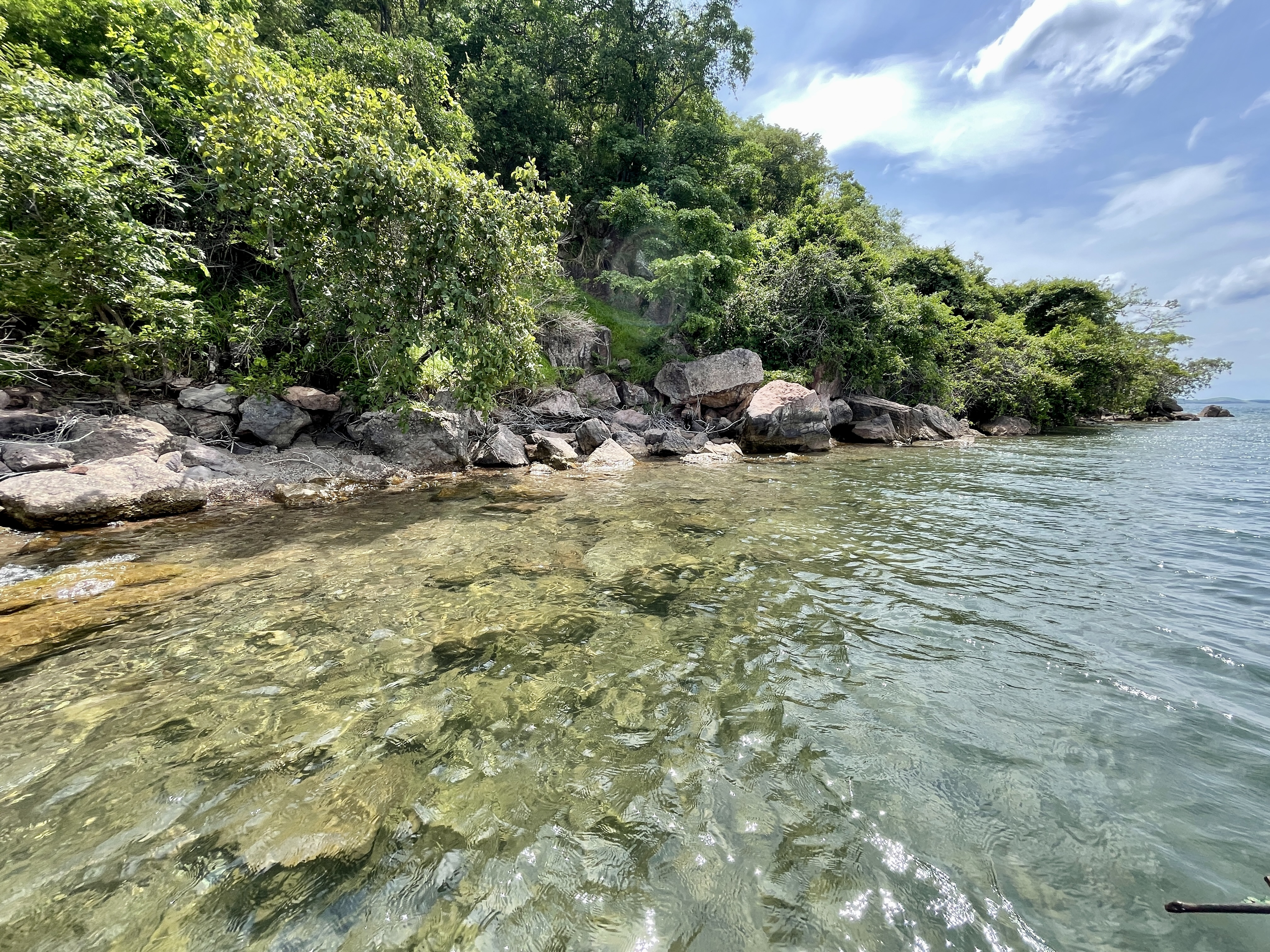
Clear water lake of Lake Tanganyika in Kagongo Ward, Kigoma Region, Tanzania

The lake's water is alkaline with a pH around 9 at depths of 0–100 m (0–330 ft). Below this, it is around 8.7, gradually decreasing to 8.3–8.5 in the deepest parts of Tanganyika. A similar pattern can be seen in the electric conductivity, ranging from about 670 μS/cm in the upper part to 690 μS/cm in the deepest.

Surface temperatures generally range from about 24 °C (75 °F) in the southern part of the lake in early August to 28–29 °C (82–84 °F) in the late rainy season in March—April. At depths greater than 400 m (1,300 ft), the temperature is very stable at 23.1–23.4 °C (73.6–74.1 °F). The water has gradually warmed since the 19th century and this has accelerated with global warming since the 1950s.

The lake is stratified and seasonal mixing generally does not extend beyond depths of 150 m (490 ft). The mixing mainly occurs as upwellings in the south and is wind-driven, but to a lesser extent, up- and downwellings also occur elsewhere in the lake. As a consequence of the stratification, the deep sections contain "fossil water". This also means it has no oxygen (it is anoxic) in the deeper parts, essentially limiting fish and other aerobic organisms to the upper part. Some geographical variations are seen in this limit, but it is typically at depths around 100 m (330 ft) in the northern part of the lake and 240–250 m (790–820 ft) in the south. The oxygen-devoid deepest sections contain high levels of toxic hydrogen sulfide and are essentially lifeless, except for bacteria.

== Biology ==
=== Reptiles ===
Lake Tanganyika and its associated wetlands are home to Nile crocodiles (including famous giant Gustave), Zambian hinged terrapins, serrated hinged terrapins, and pan hinged terrapins (last species not in the lake itself, but in adjacent lagoons). Storm's water cobra, a threatened subspecies of banded water cobra that feeds mainly on fish, is only found in Lake Tanganyika, where it prefers rocky shores.

=== Cichlid fishes ===
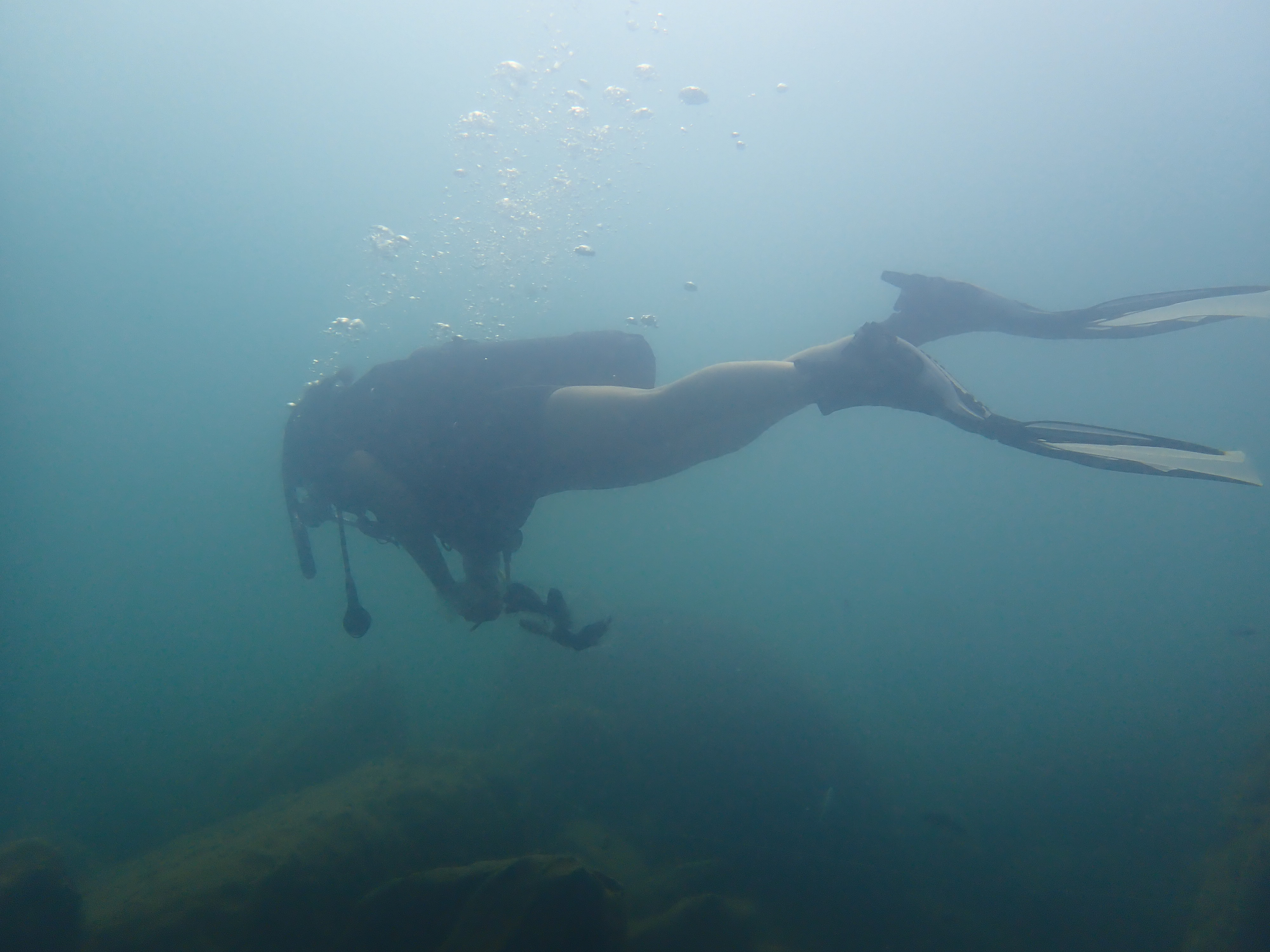
A biologist collecting samples in 2020 in the murky waters of Lake Tanganyika for a study on the diet adaptations of cichlid fishes to better understand their evolution and speciation.

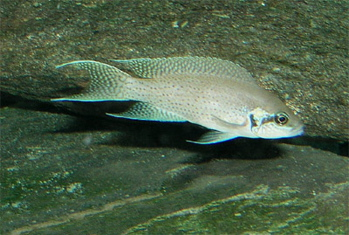
One of the many Tanganyika cichlids is Neolamprologus brichardi. The complex behaviors of this species and its close relative N. pulcher have been studied in detail

Lake Tanganyika is home to at least 250 endemic species of cichlids, and undescribed species likely remain to be discovered. Almost all (roughly 98%) of the lake's cichlid species are found solely there, and nowhere else, thus making it a precious biological resource for the study of speciation and evolution. The cichlids of the African Great Lakes, including Tanganyika, represent the most diverse extent of adaptive radiation in vertebrates. Some of the endemic species do occur slightly into the upper Lukuga River (Lake Tanganyika's outflow), but any further distribution into the Congo River basin is stemmed purely by geography and chemistry—Tanganyika's lake environment is far more stable and consistent than the rapids and fast-flowing sections of the Congo River. Additionally, Lake Tanganyika's water is alkaline and of a higher pH (which the cichlids prefer), containing a higher calcium and mineral content than the Congo's acidic, sediment-rich waters, which collect much organic detritus from the surrounding rainforests. In areas of the Congo away from rapids or whitewater, the accumulated sediment and organic matter creates sections of "blackwater", with a high concentration of tannins from dissolving wood and leaves, creating an environment in which cichlids simply do not thrive. Likewise, many tropical riverine species would likely suffer if exposed to the crisp, alkaline lake water.

Although Lake Tanganyika has fewer cichlid species than Lakes Malawi or Victoria—which both have experienced relatively recent explosive species radiations (resulting in many closely related species)—, its cichlids are the most morphologically and genetically diverse. This is linked to the maturity of Tanganyika, as it is far older than the other lakes. Tanganyika has the largest number of endemic cichlid genera of all African lakes. All Tanganyika cichlids are in the subfamily Pseudocrenilabrinae. Of the 10 tribes in this subfamily, half are largely or entirely restricted to the lake (Cyprichromini, Ectodini, Lamprologini, Limnochromini and Tropheini), while another three have species in the lake (Haplochromini, Tilapiini and Tylochromini). Others have proposed splitting the Tanganyika cichlids into as many as 12–16 tribes (Bathybatini, Benthochromini, Boulengerochromini, Cyphotilapiini, Eretmodini, Greenwoodochromini, Perissodini and Trematocarini, in addition to the aforementioned tribes).

Most Tanganyika cichlids live along the shoreline, down to a depth of 100 m (330 ft), but some deep-water species regularly descend to 200 m (660 ft). Trematocara species have, exceptionally, been found at more than 300 m (980 ft), which is deeper than any other cichlid known. Some of the deepwater genera (e.g., Bathybates, Gnathochromis, Hemibates and Xenochromis) have been caught in places virtually devoid of oxygen, and how they are able to survive there is unclear. Tanganyika cichlids are generally benthic (found at or near the bottom) and/or coastally. No Tanganyika cichlids are truly pelagic and offshore, except for some of the piscivorous Bathybates. Two of these, B. fasciatus and B. leo, mainly feed on Tanganyika sardines. Tanganyika cichlids differ extensively in ecology, and include species that are herbivores, detritivores, planktivores, insectivores, molluscivores, scavengers, scale-eaters and piscivores. These dietary specializations, however, have been shown to be variable and subject to opportunistic changes. That is, many species of Tanganyikan cichlid with specialized diets showed opportunistic, episodic exploitation of Stolothrissa tanganicae and Limnothrissa miodon when prey concentrations were unusually high. The fishes' breeding behavior falls into two main groups: the substrate- or sand-spawners (often in caves or rock crevices) and the mouthbrooders. Among the endemic species are two of the world's smallest cichlids, Neolamprologus multifasciatus and N. similis (both shell dwellers), measuring up to 4–5 cm (1.6–2.0 in), and one of the largest, the giant cichlid (Boulengerochromis microlepis) at up to 90 cm (3.0 ft).

Many cichlids from Lake Tanganyika, such as species from the genera Altolamprologus, Cyprichromis, Eretmodus, Julidochromis, Lamprologus, Neolamprologus, Tropheus and Xenotilapia, are popular aquarium fish due to their bright colors and patterns, and interesting behaviors. Recreating a Lake Tanganyika biotope to host those cichlids in a habitat similar to their natural environment is also popular in the aquarium hobby, with many species today being bred in captivity successfully.

Cichlid tribes in Lake Tanganyika (E = tribe endemic or near-endemic)

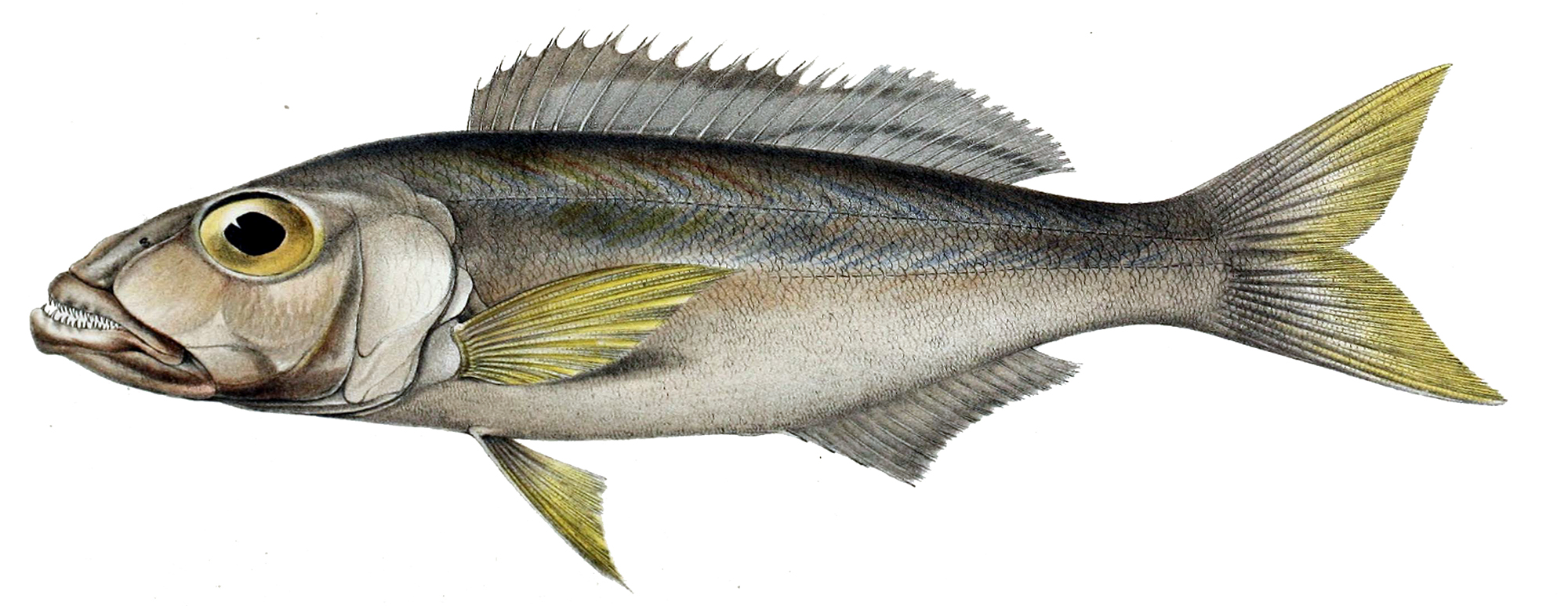
Bathybatini (E): Bathybates ferox is benthic and piscivorous, but the genus also includes pelagic species. The tribe is sometimes split in three, others being Hemibatini and Trematocarini

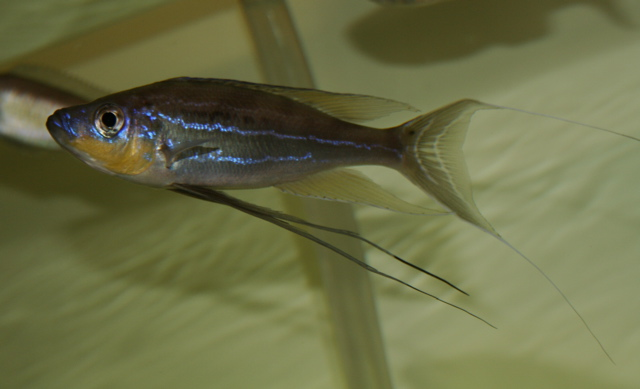
Benthochromini (E): Benthochromis horii was scientifically described in 2008, but has often been misidentifed as B. tricoti

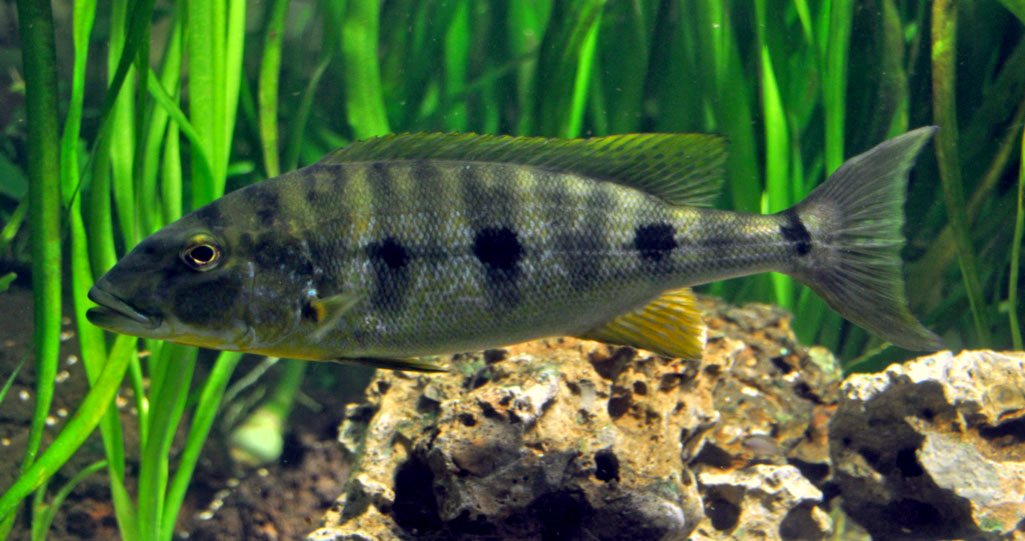
Boulengerochromini (E): Boulengerochromis microlepis is one of the world's largest cichlids and only member of its tribe

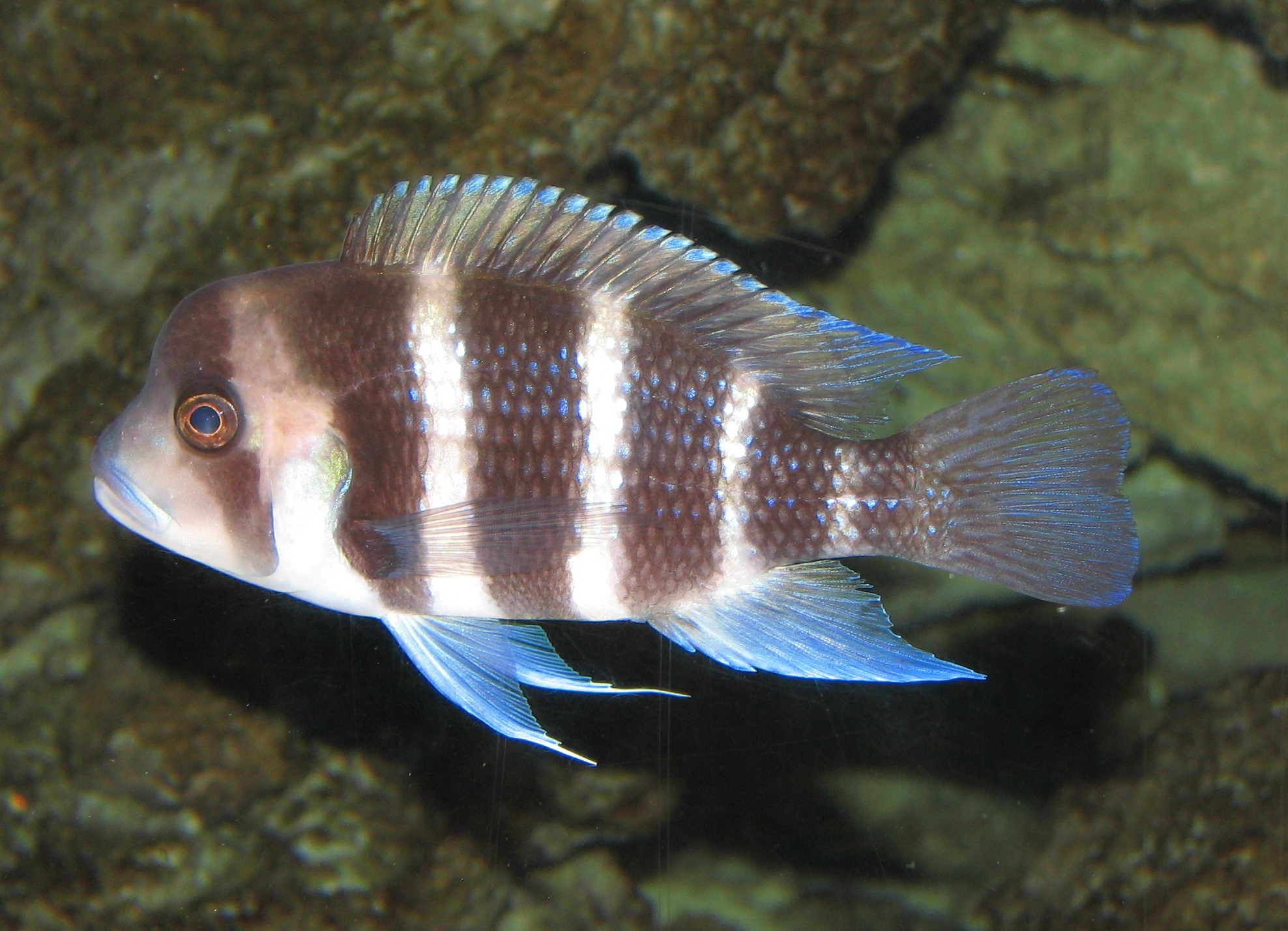
Cyphotilapiini (E): Cyphotilapia frontosa, one of only two similar species in the tribe

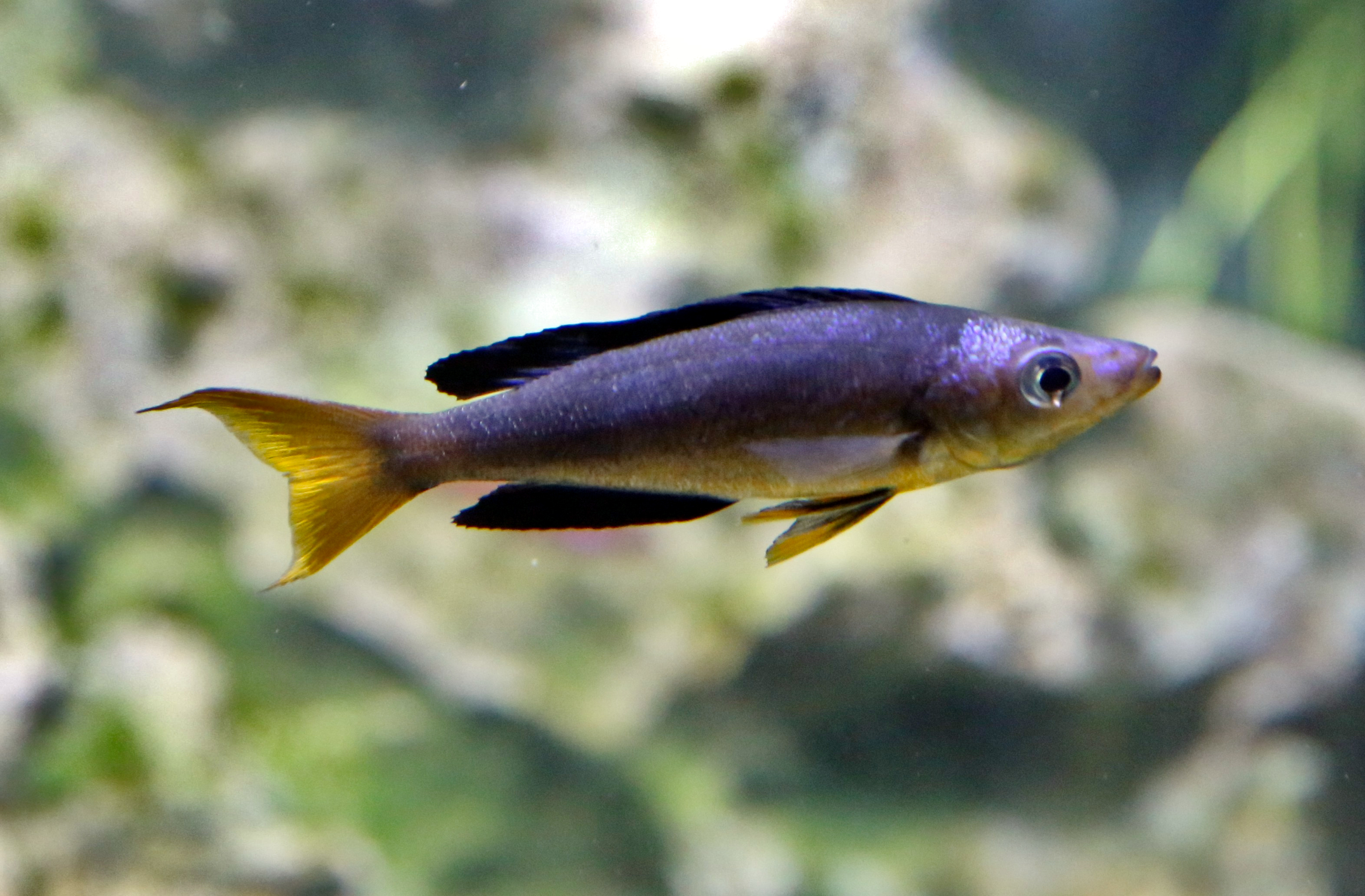
Cyprichromini (E): Cyprichromis microlepidotus and other members of this tribe are open-water planktivores

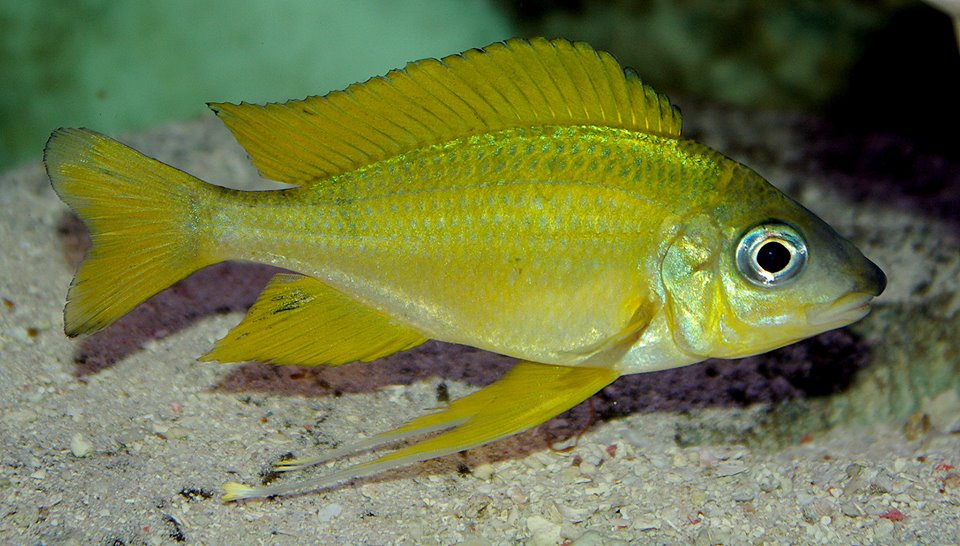
Ectodini (E): Ophthalmotilapia nasuta (male) is sexually dimorphic, males being more colorful with longer fins and nose

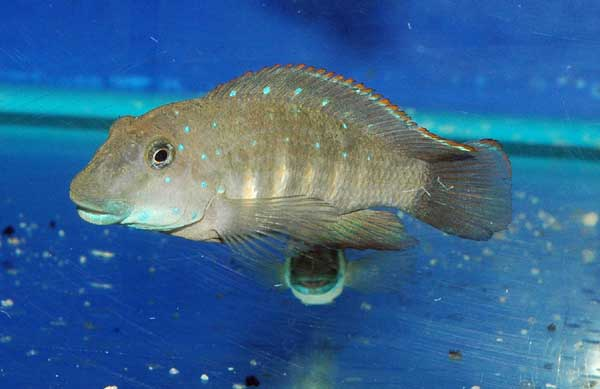
Eretmodini (E): Eretmodus cyanostictus lives near the bottom in the turbulent, coastal surf zone, like other members of its tribe

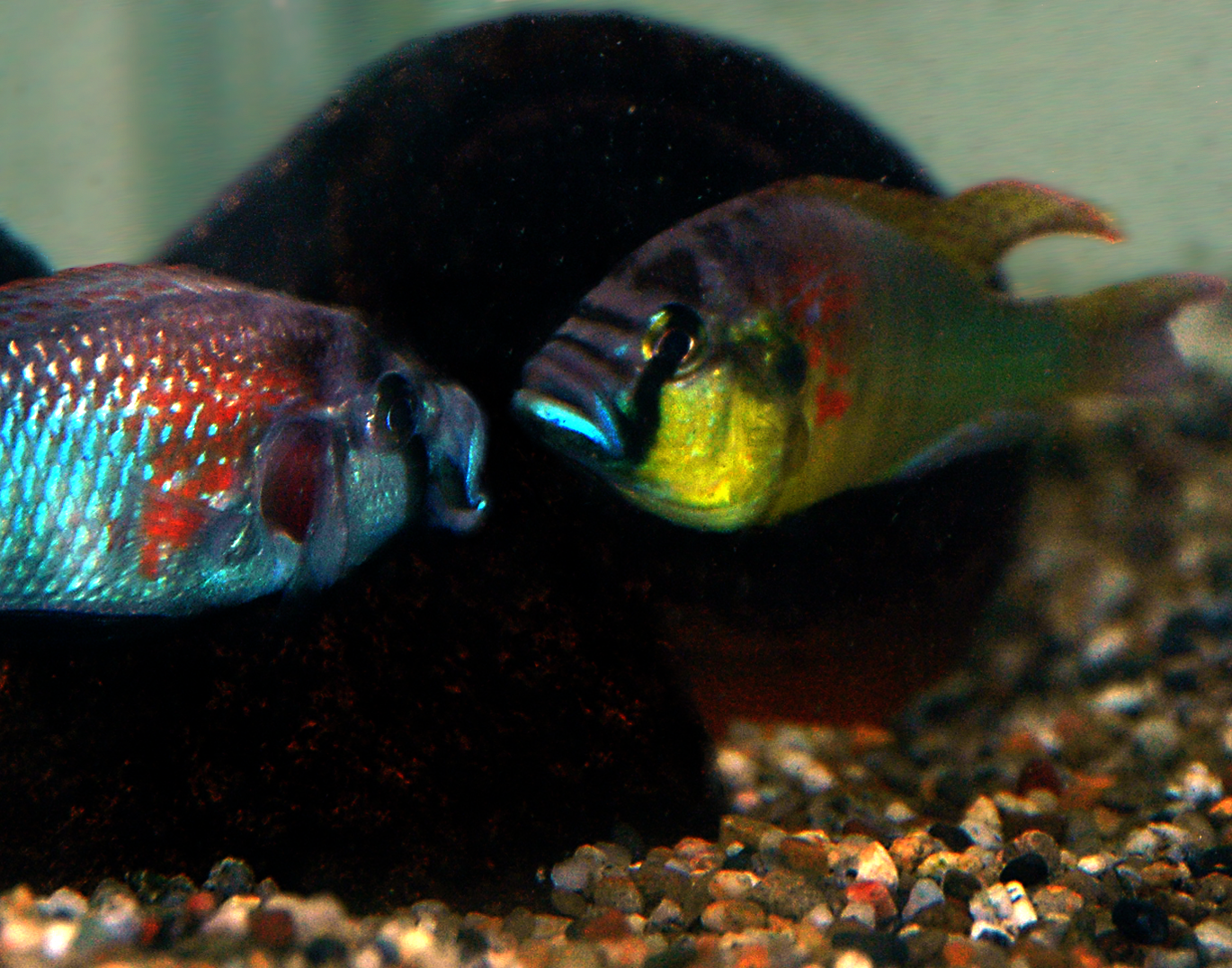
Haplochromini: Astatotilapia burtoni is one of the few Tanganyika species, unlike other African Great Lakes where most belong to this tribe

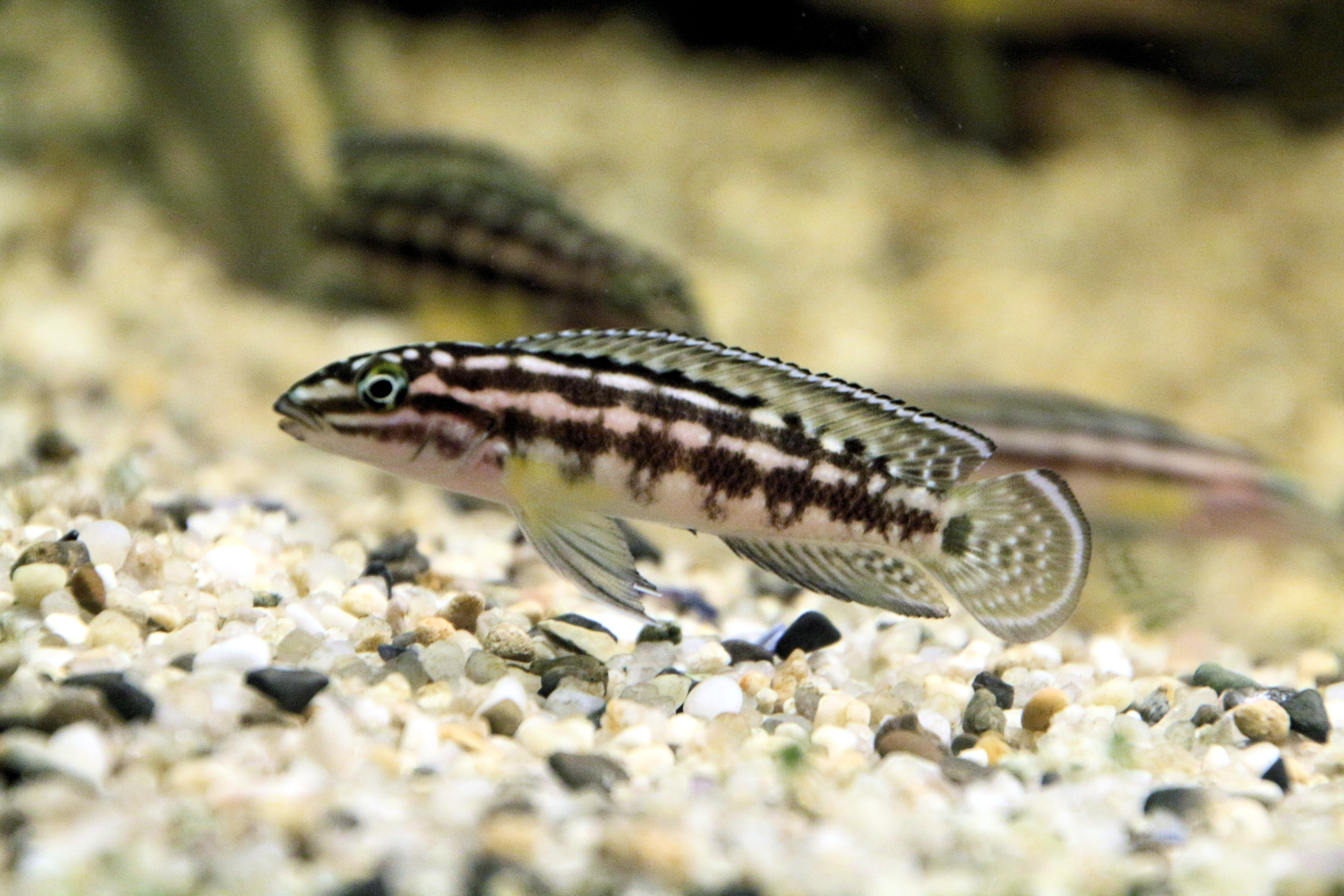
Lamprologini (E): Julidochromis marlieri is popular in the aquarium trade where members of the genus are known as "Julies"

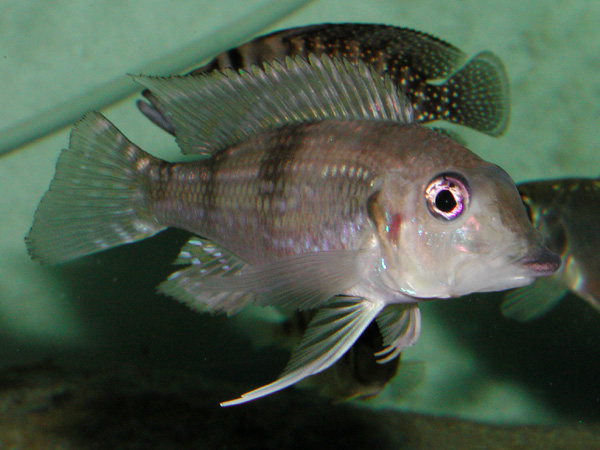
Limnochromini (E): Gnathochromis permaxillaris is a zooplanktivore with an unusual protractile mouth

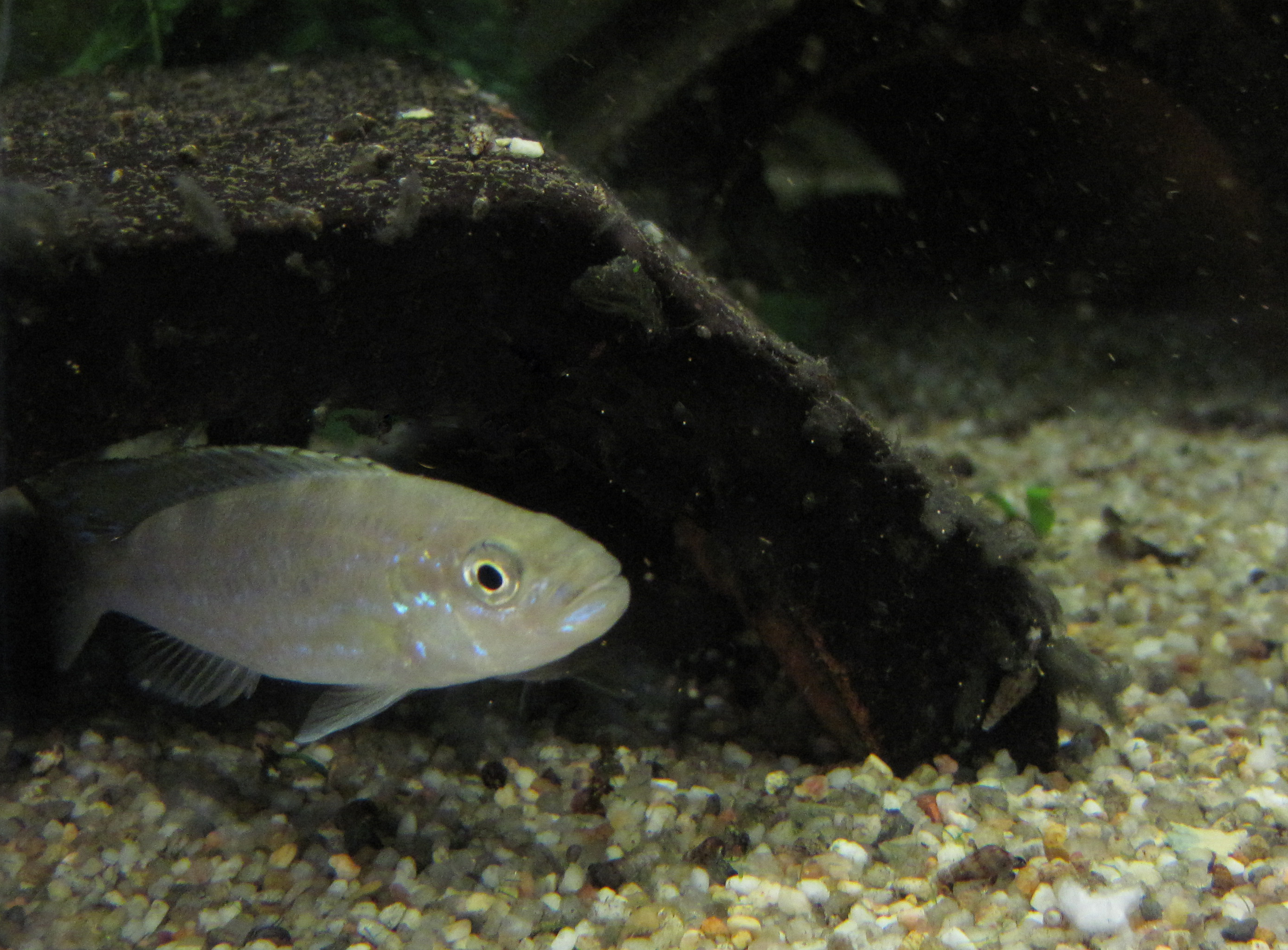
Perissodini (E): Perissodus microlepis, a specialized scale-eating species

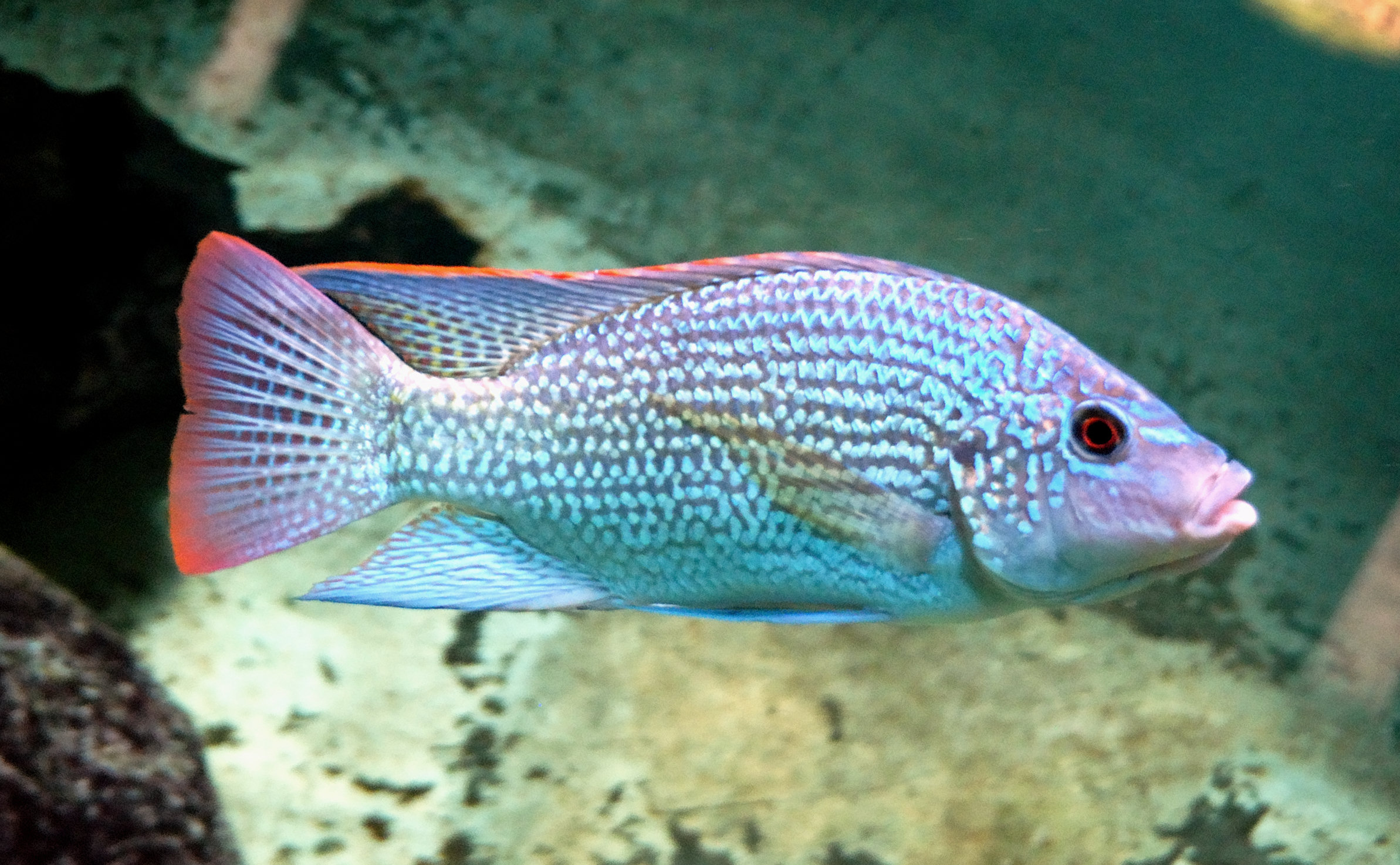
Tilapiini: Oreochromis tanganicae is one of the most common coastal species found in local fish markets

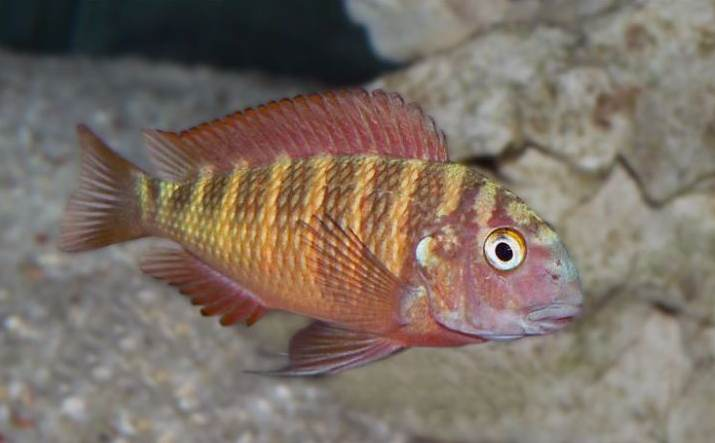
Tropheini (E): Tropheus moorii ("red" Chimba morph) is highly variable and the taxonomy of some of the morphs is questionable

=== Other fish ===
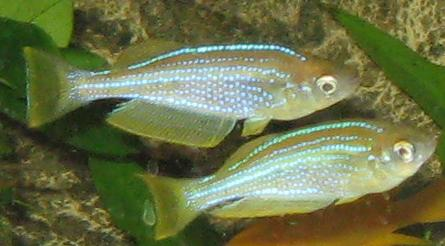
The Tanganyika killifish (Lamprichthys tanganicanus) is the only member of its genus

Lake Tanganyika is home to more than 80 species of non-cichlid fish and about 60% of these are endemic.

The open waters of the pelagic zone are dominated by four non-cichlid species: Two species of "Tanganyika sardine" (Limnothrissa miodon and Stolothrissa tanganicae) form the largest biomass of fish in this zone, and they are important prey for the forktail lates (Lates microlepis) and sleek lates (L. stappersii). Two additional lates are found in the lake, the Tanganyika lates (L. angustifrons) and bigeye lates (L. mariae), but both these are primarily benthic hunters, although they also may move into open waters. The four lates, all endemic to Tanganyika, have been overfished and larger individuals are rare today.

Among the more unusual fish in the lake are the endemic, facultatively brood parasitic "cuckoo catfish", including at least Synodontis grandiops and S. multipunctatus. A number of others are very similar (e.g., S. lucipinnis and S. petricola) and have often been confused; it is unclear if they have a similar behavior. The facultative brood parasites often lay their eggs synchronously with mouthbrooding cichlids. The cichlid pick up the eggs in their mouth as if they were their own. Once the catfish eggs hatch the young eat the cichlid eggs. Six catfish genera are entirely restricted to the lake basin: Bathybagrus, Dinotopterus, Lophiobagrus, Phyllonemus, Pseudotanganikallabes and Tanganikallabes. Although not endemic on a genus level, six species of Chrysichthys catfish are only found in the Tanganyika basin where they live both in shallow and relatively deep waters; in the latter habitat they are the primary predators and scavengers. A unique evolutionary radiation in the lake is the 15 species of Mastacembelus spiny eels, all but one endemic to its basin. Although other African Great Lakes have Synodontis catfish, endemic catfish genera and Mastacembelus spiny eels, the relatively high diversity is unique to Tanganyika, which likely is related to its old age.

Among the non-endemic fish, some are widespread African species but several are only shared with the Malagarasi and Congo River basins, such as the Congo bichir (Polypterus congicus), goliath tigerfish (Hydrocynus goliath), Citharinus citharus, six-banded distichodus (Distichodus sexfasciatus) and mbu puffer (Tetraodon mbu).

=== Molluscs and crustaceans ===
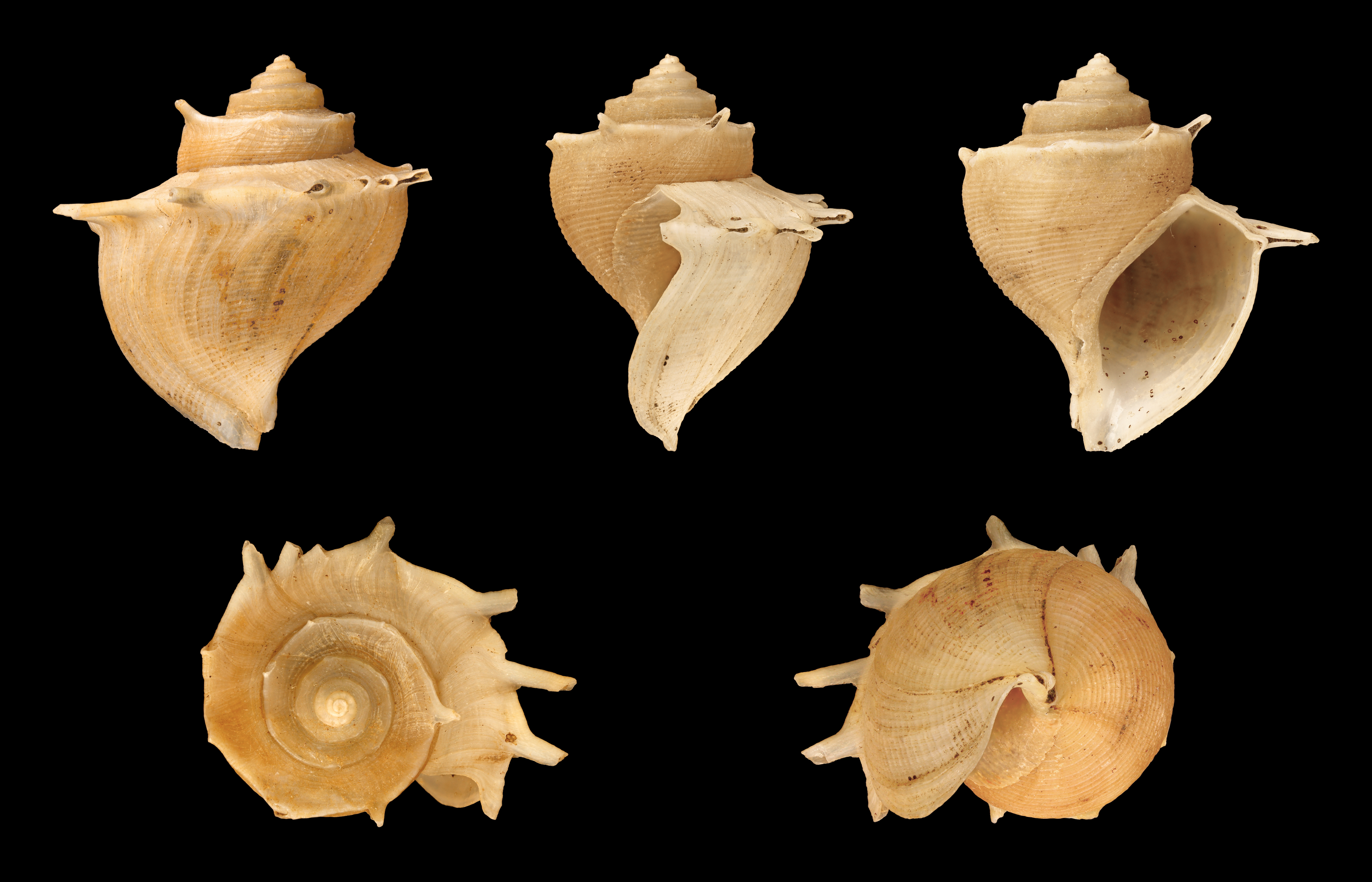
The shell of the endemic thalassoid freshwater snail Tiphobia horei with its elaborate shape and spines.

A total of 83 freshwater snail species (65 endemic) and 11 bivalve species (8 endemic) are known from the lake. Among the endemic bivalves are three monotypic genera: Grandidieria burtoni, Pseudospatha tanganyicensis and Brazzaea anceyi. Many of the snails are unusual for species living in freshwater in having noticeably thickened shells and/or distinct sculpture, features more commonly seen in marine snails. They are referred to as thalassoids, which can be translated to "marine-like". All the Tanganyika thalassoids, which are part of Prosobranchia, are endemic to the lake. Initially they were believed to be related to similar marine snails, but they are now known to be unrelated. Their appearance is now believed to be the result of the highly diverse habitats in Lake Tanganyika and evolutionary pressure from snail-eating fish and, in particular, Platythelphusa crabs. A total of 17 freshwater snail genera are endemic to the lake, such as Hirthia, Lavigeria, Paramelania, Reymondia, Spekia, Stanleya, Tanganyicia and Tiphobia. There are about 30 species of non-thalassoid snails in the lake, but only five of these are endemic, including Ferrissia tanganyicensis and Neothauma tanganyicense. The latter is the largest Tanganyika snail and its shell is often used by small shell-dwelling cichlids.

Crustaceans are also highly diverse in Tanganyika with more than 200 species, of which more than half are endemic. They include 10 species of freshwater crabs (9 Platythelphusa and Potamonautes platynotus; all endemic), at least 11 species of small atyid shrimp (Atyella, Caridella and Limnocaridina), an endemic palaemonid shrimp (Macrobrachium moorei), about 100 ostracods, including many endemics, and several copepods. Among these, Limnocaridina iridinae lives inside the mantle cavity of the unionid mussel Pleiodon spekei, making it one of only two known commensal species of freshwater shrimp (the other is the sponge-living Caridina spongicola from Lake Towuti, Indonesia).

Among Rift Valley lakes, Lake Tanganyika far surpasses all others in terms of crustacean and freshwater snail richness (both in total number of species and number of endemics). For example, the only other Rift Valley lake with endemic freshwater crabs are Lake Kivu and Lake Victoria with two species each.

=== Other invertebrates ===
The diversity of other invertebrate groups in Lake Tanganyika is often not well-known, but there are at least 20 described species of leeches (12 endemics), 9 sponges (7 endemic), 6 bryozoa (2 endemic), 11 flatworms (7 endemic), 20 nematodes (7 endemic), 28 annelids (17 endemic) and the small hydrozoan jellyfish Limnocnida tanganyicae.

== Fishing ==
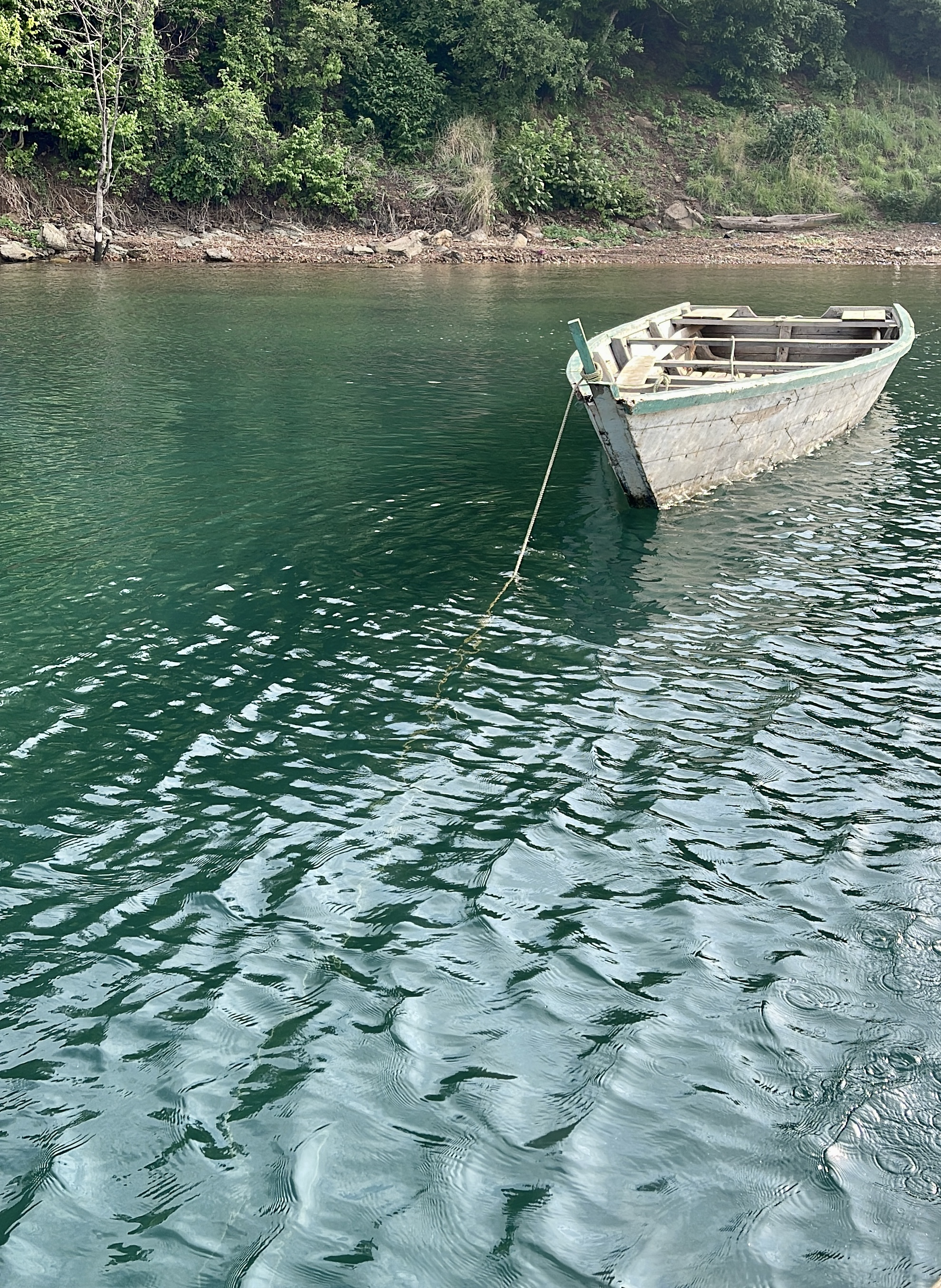
Fishing Boat in Kagongo Ward, Kigoma District

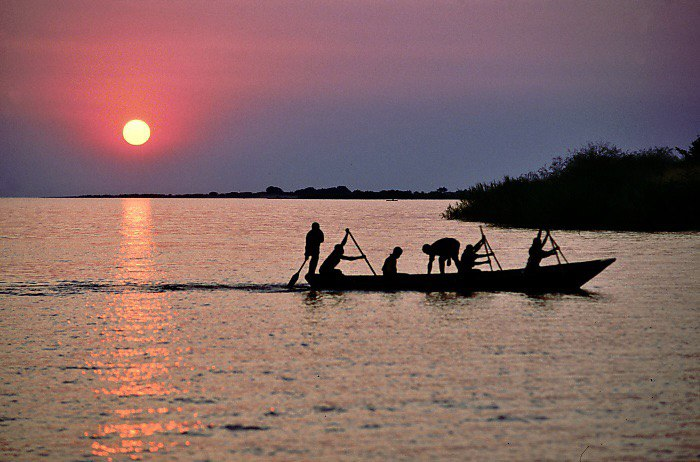
Fishermen on Lake Tanganyika

Lake Tanganyika supports a major fishery, which, depending on source, provides 25–40% or c. 60% of the animal protein in the diet of the people living in the region.

Lake Tanganyika fish can be found exported throughout East Africa. Major commercial fishing began in the mid-1950s and has, together with global warming, had a heavy impact on the fish populations, causing significant declines. In 2016, it was estimated that the total catch was up to 200,000 tonnes.

There are many methods which the inhabitants of the area have traditionally used for fishing. Most of them included using a lantern as a lure for fish that are attracted to light. In some locations, well over a hundred lights may be seen on the lake at night. There were three basic forms. One called Lusenga which is a wide net used by one person from a canoe. The second one is using a lift net. This was done by dropping a net deep below the boat using two parallel canoes and then simultaneously pulling it up. The third is called Chiromila which consisted of three canoes. One canoe was stationary with a lantern while another canoe holds one end of the net and the other circles the stationary one to meet up with the net.

== History ==
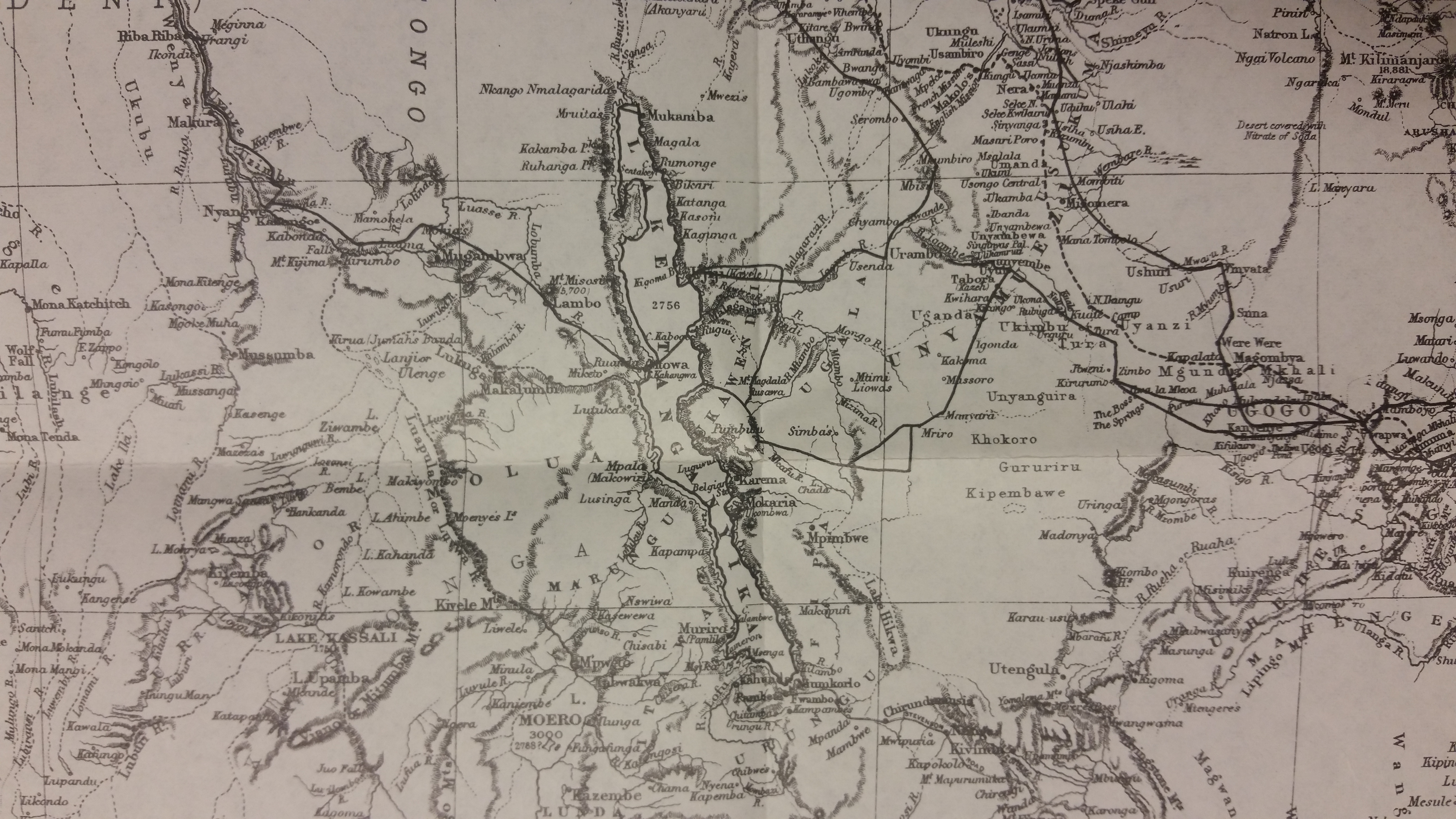
Lake Tanganyika. The black line indicates Henry Morton Stanley's route.

It is thought that early Homo sapiens were making an impact on the region during the Stone Age. The time period of the Middle Stone Age to Late Stone Age is described as an age of advanced hunter-gatherers.

In the mid–19th century, Swahili Arab traders from Zanzibar established a caravan route from Bagamoyo via Tabora to Ujiji on Lake Tanganyika. They brought sailing dhows to navigate the lake and traded in slaves, ivory, guns and cotton. Chief among these traders was Tippu Tip in the second half of the 19th century, who established a state west of the lake.

The first known Westerners to find the lake were the British explorers Richard Burton and John Speke, in 1858. They located it while searching for the source of the Nile River. Speke continued and found the actual source, Lake Victoria. David Livingstone visited the lake several times in his last expedition 1866–73, also searching for the source of the Nile. He explored the central western, northeastern and northern shores of the lake by canoe. He famously met Henry Morton Stanley in Ujiji on the eastern shore in 1871, and the two travelled together by canoe in the northern lake. Finally he went on land down the southeastern shore and around the southern end of the lake and then west to Lake Mweru He noted the name "Liemba" for its southern part, a word probably from the Fipa language. Tanganyika means "stars" in the Luvale language.

Colonialism arrived at the lake in the late 19th century with Britain, Germany and King Leopold of Belgium establishing colonial territories on the lake. In the early 20th century they ended the slave trade, and slowly replaced the Swahili-Arabs' control of other trade on the lake.

The lake was the scene of Battle for Lake Tanganyika during World War I. With the aid of the Graf Goetzen, the Germans had complete control of the lake in the early stages of the war. The ship was used both to ferry cargo and personnel across the lake, and as a base from which to launch surprise attacks on Allied troops. It therefore became essential for the Allied forces to gain control of the lake themselves. Under the command of Lieutenant Commander Geoffrey Spicer-Simson the British Royal Navy achieved the monumental task of bringing two armed motor boats HMS Mimi and HMS Toutou from England to the lake by rail, road and river to Albertville (since renamed Kalemie in 1971) on the western shore of Lake Tanganyika. The two boats waited until December 1915, and mounted a surprise attack on the Germans, with the capture of the gunboat Kingani. Another German vessel, the Hedwig, was sunk in February 1916, leaving the Götzen as the only German vessel remaining to control the lake. In order to avoid his prize ship falling into Allied hands, Zimmer scuttled the vessel on July 26, 1916. The vessel was later raised in 1924 and renamed MV Liemba.

== See also ==
- Cryptodepression
