= Xenotilapia burtoni =

Conservation status
- Endangered (IUCN 3.1)

Scientific classification
- Kingdom: Animalia
- Phylum: Chordata
- Class: Actinopterygii
- Division: Teleostei
- Order: Cichliformes
- Family: Cichlidae
- Genus: Xenotilapia
- Species: X. burtoni

Binomial name
- Xenotilapia burtoni Poll, 1951

Synonyms
- Xenotilapia longispinis burtoni Poll, 1951

Species of fish

Xenotilapia burtoni is a species of cichlid endemic to Burton Bay in Lake Tanganyika, Democratic Republic of the Congo. It is the only Xenotilapia species restricted to a single bay in the lake, and is classified as endangered due to its extremely limited range and ongoing habitat degradation.

== Taxonomy ==
The species was first described by the Belgian ichthyologist Max Poll in 1951 as Xenotilapia longispinis burtoni, a subspecies of Xenotilapia longispinis, based on specimens collected from Burton Bay during the 1946–1947 hydrobiological exploration of Lake Tanganyika. It was subsequently elevated to full species status. The specific name burtoni refers to Burton Bay, the type locality of the species; the bay itself is named after the British explorer Richard Francis Burton, who reached Lake Tanganyika in 1858.

Xenotilapia burtoni belongs to the tribe Ectodini, a diverse lineage of Lake Tanganyika cichlids that includes both sand-dwelling and rock-dwelling species. Phylogenetic analyses place Xenotilapia within a benthic clade alongside the genera Asprotilapia, Enantiopus, and Microdontochromis.

== Description ==
Xenotilapia burtoni can reach a maximum total length of 17.7 centimetres (7.0 in). Like other members of its genus, it has a streamlined body and a somewhat pointed snout adapted for sifting through substrate.

== Distribution and habitat ==
The species is known only from its type locality, Burton Bay, on the western (Congolese) shore of Lake Tanganyika. It inhabits sandy and muddy bottoms at an average depth of around 10 metres (33 ft), though specimens have been collected as deep as 40 metres (130 ft). It is considered rare within this already limited range.

== Ecology ==
Xenotilapia burtoni is a demersal species that forms schools over sandy or silty substrates. It feeds primarily on insect larvae and small crustaceans, sifting mouthfuls of sediment to extract prey. Remnants of ostracods and shells have also been found in its diet.

== Conservation ==
Xenotilapia burtoni was assessed as Vulnerable under criterion D2 by the IUCN in 2006, reflecting its restriction to a single location. It was reassessed in 2025 and upgraded to Endangered under criterion B1ab(iii), which reflects a continuing decline in the quality of its habitat. The principal threats are sedimentation, water pollution, and habitat disturbance within Burton Bay. No specific conservation measures are currently in place for this species.

== In the aquarium ==
The species is occasionally available in the aquarium trade.
