= Boop =

Boop may refer to:

== Nature ==
- Astata boops, a species of wasp
- Boops, a genus of saltwater fishes
  - Boops boops, a species of saltwater fish
- Eubetia boop, a species of moth
- Haplochromis boops, a species of cichlid
- Ophthalmotilapia boops, a species of fish
- Polysphincta boops, a species of wasp
- Rosa 'Betty Boop', a cultivar of rose
- Selar boops, a species of fish

== Film and television ==
- Betty Boop, a cartoon character and cousin of Buzzy
- Buzzy Boop, a cartoon character and cousin of Betty
- "Boop" (Shrinking), a 2023 television episode

== Medicine ==
- Cryptogenic organizing pneumonia, an inflammation in the lungs
