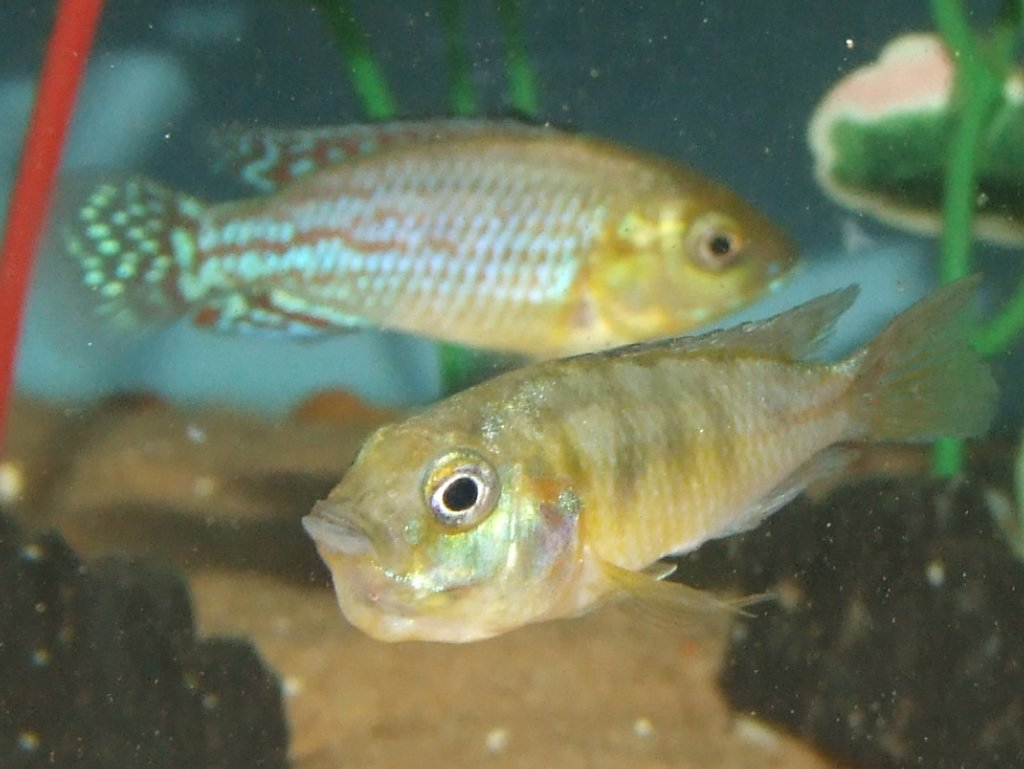
- Female holding eggs. Male in the background.

Conservation status
- Least Concern (IUCN 3.1)

Scientific classification
- Kingdom: Animalia
- Phylum: Chordata
- Class: Actinopterygii
- Order: Cichliformes
- Family: Cichlidae
- Genus: Pseudocrenilabrus
- Species: P. nicholsi

Binomial name
- Pseudocrenilabrus nicholsi (Pellegrin, 1928)

Synonyms
- Paratilapia nicholsi Pellegrin, 1928; Paratilapia ventralis Nichols, 1928 (ambiguous name); Haplochromis ventralis (Nichols, 1928) (ambiguous name)

= Pseudocrenilabrus nicholsi =

Species of fish

Pseudocrenilabrus nicholsi is a species of cichlid native to the Congo Basin in Africa. As other members of the genus Pseudocrenilabrus, it is a mouthbrooder. This species can reach a length of 8.5 centimetres (3.3 in) SL. The specific name honours the American ichthyologist John Treadwell Nichols (1883–1958) who was curator of fishes at the American Museum of Natural History. Nichols originally described this species as Paratilapia ventralis in 1928 but this name had already been used by George Albert Boulenger for another species of cichlid in 1898.

Males of this species usually display brighter colors and larger fins than females, particularly while breeding, showing sexual dimorphism. Pseudocrenilabrus nicholsi has a crucial impact on its environment by helping to maintain the ecological balance in the Congo Basin through its feeding patterns and reproduction practices.
