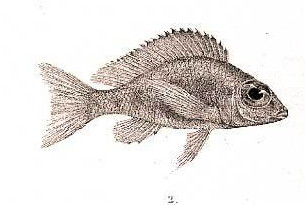

Conservation status
- Least Concern (IUCN 3.1)

Scientific classification
- Kingdom: Animalia
- Phylum: Chordata
- Class: Actinopterygii
- Order: Cichliformes
- Family: Cichlidae
- Subfamily: Pseudocrenilabrinae
- Tribe: Ectodini
- Genus: Callochromis
- Species: C. macrops

Binomial name
- Callochromis macrops (Boulenger, 1898)

Synonyms
- Paratilapia macrops Boulenger, 1898; Pelmatochromis macrops (Boulenger, 1898); Pelmatochromis xenotilapiaformis Borodin, 1931; Tylochromis macrophthalmus David, 1936

= Callochromis macrops =

Species of fish

Callochromis macrops is a species cichlid endemic to Lake Tanganyika where it is found over sandy bottoms. This species reaches a length of 13.5 centimetres (5.3 in) TL. This species can also be found in the aquarium trade. It is the type species of the genus Callochromis.
