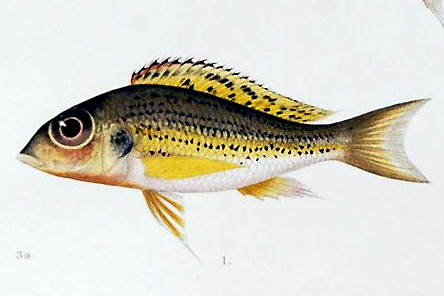

Conservation status
- Near Threatened (IUCN 3.1)

Scientific classification
- Kingdom: Animalia
- Phylum: Chordata
- Class: Actinopterygii
- Order: Cichliformes
- Family: Cichlidae
- Subfamily: Pseudocrenilabrinae
- Tribe: Ectodini
- Genus: Callochromis
- Species: C. melanostigma

Binomial name
- Callochromis melanostigma (Boulenger, 1906)

Synonyms
- Paratilapia macrops Boulenger, 1898; Pelmatochromis macrops (Boulenger, 1898); Pelmatochromis xenotilapiaformis Borodin, 1931; Tylochromis macrophthalmus David, 1936

= Callochromis melanostigma =

Species of fish

Callochromis melanostigma is a species of cichlid endemic to Lake Tanganyika where it prefers sandy bottoms with nearby rocks. This fish grows to a length of 15 centimetres (5.9 in) TL. It is also found in the aquarium trade.
