= Cichlidogyrus makasai =

Scientific classification
- Kingdom: Animalia
- Phylum: Platyhelminthes
- Class: Monogenea
- Order: Dactylogyridea
- Family: Ancyrocephalidae
- Genus: Cichlidogyrus
- Species: C. makasai

Binomial name
- Cichlidogyrus makasai Vanhove, Volckaert & Pariselle, 2011

Species of flatworm

Cichlidogyrus makasai is a species of monopisthocotylean monogenean in the family Ancyrocephalidae. It was first found infecting the gills of Ophthalmotilapia ventralis in Lake Tanganyika. It can be differentiated from its cogenerates by the unusual length of its dorsal transverse bar auricles.

== Etymology ==
The species was named to honor research assistant Lawrence Makasa, "for his participation and contribution to the field expedition in Zambia and Tanzania during which most of the specimens for this study were collected".
