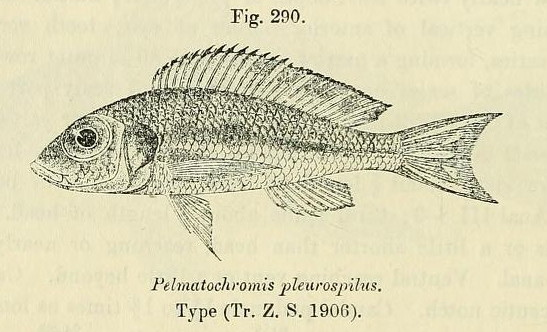

Conservation status
- Least Concern (IUCN 3.1)

Scientific classification
- Kingdom: Animalia
- Phylum: Chordata
- Class: Actinopterygii
- Order: Cichliformes
- Family: Cichlidae
- Subfamily: Pseudocrenilabrinae
- Tribe: Ectodini
- Genus: Callochromis
- Species: C. pleurospilus

Binomial name
- Callochromis pleurospilus (Boulenger, 1906)

Synonyms
- Pelmatochromis pleurospilus Boulenger, 1906; Pelmatochromis rhodostigma Boulenger, 1906; Callochromis rhodostigma (Boulenger, 1906); Pelmatochromis stappersii Boulenger, 1914; Callochromis stappersii (Boulenger, 1914)

= Callochromis pleurospilus =

Species of fish

Callochromis pleurospilus is a species of cichlid endemic to Lake Tanganyika excepting the southern end. Its preferred habitat consists of sandy bottoms with nearby rocks. This fish reaches a length of 10 centimetres (3.9 in) TL. It can also be found in the aquarium trade.
