= Cichlidogyrus sturmbaueri =

Scientific classification
- Kingdom: Animalia
- Phylum: Platyhelminthes
- Class: Monogenea
- Order: Dactylogyridea
- Family: Ancyrocephalidae
- Genus: Cichlidogyrus
- Species: C. sturmbaueri

Binomial name
- Cichlidogyrus sturmbaueri Vanhove, Volckaert & Pariselle, 2011

Species of flatworm

Cichlidogyrus sturmbaueri is a species of monopisthocotylean monogenean in the family Ancyrocephalidae. It was first found infecting the gills of Ophthalmotilapia ventralis in Lake Tanganyika. It can be differentiated from its cogenerates by the unique shape of the accessory piece of its male genitalia.

== Etymology ==
The species was named in honor of Austrian professor Christian Sturmbauer, "specialist in the evolution of Tanganyika cichlids and team leader of the expedition in Zambia and Tanzania during which most of the host fish used in this study was caught".
