= Cichlidogyrus vandekerkhovei =

Scientific classification
- Kingdom: Animalia
- Phylum: Platyhelminthes
- Class: Monogenea
- Order: Dactylogyridea
- Family: Ancyrocephalidae
- Genus: Cichlidogyrus
- Species: C. vandekerkhovei

Binomial name
- Cichlidogyrus vandekerkhovei Vanhove, Volckaert & Pariselle, 2011

Species of flatworm

Cichlidogyrus vandekerkhovei is a species of monopisthocotylean monogeneans in the family Ancyrocephalidae. It was first found infecting the gills of Ophthalmotilapia ventralis in Lake Tanganyika. It can be differentiated from its cogenerates by the unusual length of its dorsal transverse bar auricles.

== Etymology ==
The species was named in honor of Belgian aquatic ecologist Dr. Jochen Vandekerkhove, "in recognition of his guidance during the early research years of the junior author".
