= Pseudocrenilabrus pyrrhocaudalis =

Scientific classification
- Domain: Eukaryota
- Kingdom: Animalia
- Phylum: Chordata
- Class: Actinopterygii
- Order: Cichliformes
- Family: Cichlidae
- Genus: Pseudocrenilabrus
- Species: P. pyrrhocaudalis

Binomial name
- Pseudocrenilabrus pyrrhocaudalis Katongo, Seehausen & Snoeks, 2017

Species of fish

Pseudocrenilabrus pyrrhocaudalis, the fire-tailed pseudocrenilabrus, is a newly described species of small mouth-brooding haplochromine cichlid from Lake Mweru in south west central Africa. Its specific name is descriptive of its bright flame coloured orange tail in the breeding males which distinguishes it from the more widespread Pseudocrenilabrus philander.

== Description ==
In Pseudocrenilabrus pyrrhocaudalis the males have a distinctive colour pattern which typically shows some orange colour on the anal fin and on the caudal fin that brightens to orange-red when breeding, this bright colour extends over the parts of anal and caudal fins nearest the body and on to the caudal peduncle. A number of other characteristics distinguish P. pyrrhocaudalis from its sympatric congener Pseudocrenilabrus philander, among these are the white pelvic fins, an orange rear portion of the dorsal fin, thinner lips and a larger eye. The maximum length is 7.3 cm standard length.

== Distribution ==
Pseudocrenilabrus pyrrhocaudalis is known only from, and may be endemic to Lake Mweru in the Luapula-Congo river system on the borders between the Democratic Republic of the Congo and Zambia.

== Biology ==
Pseudocrenilabrus pyrrhocaudalis lives sympatrically in Lake Mweru with P. philander with the latter species preferring the shallow waters in the inshore areas of the lake and P. pyrrhocaudalis being caught in seine nets in deeper water near open beaches. Molecular studies indicate that there are at least three distinct clades of Pseudocrenilabrus cichlids in this area of Africa, suggesting that there has been a centre of diversity for these fish in this region.
