= Cichlidogyrus centesimus =

Scientific classification
- Kingdom: Animalia
- Phylum: Platyhelminthes
- Class: Monogenea
- Order: Dactylogyridea
- Family: Ancyrocephalidae
- Genus: Cichlidogyrus
- Species: C. centesimus

Binomial name
- Cichlidogyrus centesimus Vanhove, Volckaert & Pariselle, 2011

Species of flatworm

Cichlidogyrus centesimus is a species of monopisthocotylean monogenean in the family Ancyrocephalidae. It was first found infecting the gills of Ophthalmotilapia ventralis in Lake Tanganyika. It can be differentiated from its cogenerates by possessing a spirally coiled thickening at the end of its penis, the accessory piece in the genital apparatus being nonexistent, and a particular uncinuli configuration in its haptor. Its specific epithet is derived from the Latin centesimus, meaning "hundredth", due to the fact that it was the 100th species described by Antoine Pariselle.
