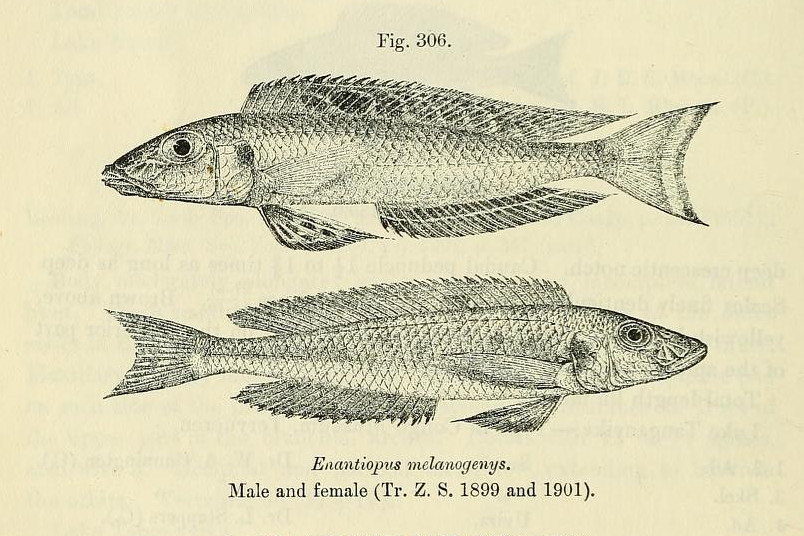

Conservation status
- Data Deficient (IUCN 3.1)

Scientific classification
- Kingdom: Animalia
- Phylum: Chordata
- Class: Actinopterygii
- Order: Cichliformes
- Family: Cichlidae
- Genus: Xenotilapia
- Species: X. melanogenys

Binomial name
- Xenotilapia melanogenys (Boulenger, 1898)

Synonyms
- Ectodus melanogenys Boulenger, 1898; Enantiopus melanogenys (Boulenger, 1898); Ectodus longianalis Boulenger, 1899; Enantiopus longianalis (Boulenger, 1899)

= Xenotilapia melanogenys =

Species of fish

Xenotilapia melanogenys is a species of cichlid endemic to Lake Tanganyika. This species can reach a length of 15 centimetres (5.9 in) TL. It can also be found in the aquarium trade.
