= Cardiopharynx =

Conservation status
- Least Concern (IUCN 3.1)

Scientific classification
- Kingdom: Animalia
- Phylum: Chordata
- Class: Actinopterygii
- Order: Cichliformes
- Family: Cichlidae
- Subfamily: Pseudocrenilabrinae
- Tribe: Ectodini
- Genus: Cardiopharynx
- Species: C. schoutedeni

Binomial name
- Cardiopharynx schoutedeni Poll, 1942

Synonyms
- Cyathopharynx schoutedeni (Poll, 1942)

Species of fish

Cardiopharynx schoutedeni is a species of cichlid endemic to Lake Tanganyika in East Africa. It is found in Burundi, the Democratic Republic of the Congo, Tanzania, and Zambia. This semi-pelagic fish prefers habitats over sandy bottoms where it feeds on aquatic microorganisms. It can reach a length of 15 centimetres (5.9 in) TL. It is also found in the aquarium trade. The specific name honours the Belgian zoologist Henri Schouteden (1881-1972) who was director of Musée Royal de l'Afrique Centrale in Tervuren and who was one of the first zoologists to collect this species.
