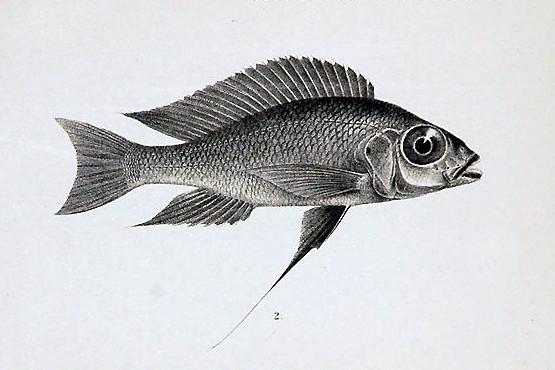

Conservation status
- Least Concern (IUCN 3.1)

Scientific classification
- Kingdom: Animalia
- Phylum: Chordata
- Class: Actinopterygii
- Order: Cichliformes
- Family: Cichlidae
- Subfamily: Pseudocrenilabrinae
- Tribe: Ectodini
- Genus: Cunningtonia; Boulenger, 1906
- Species: C. longiventralis

Binomial name
- Cunningtonia longiventralis Boulenger, 1906

= Cunningtonia =

Genus of fishes

Cunningtonia longiventralis is a species of cichlid endemic to Lake Tanganyika in East Africa where it is found near rocky shores. It eats floating plankton. This species reaches a length of 14 centimetres (5.5 in) TL. It can also be found in the aquarium trade. As of 2011 it is the only known member of its genus. The generic name honours the British zoologist and anthropologist William Alfred Cunnington (1877-1958), the leader of the expedition to Lake Tanganyika during which type was collected.
