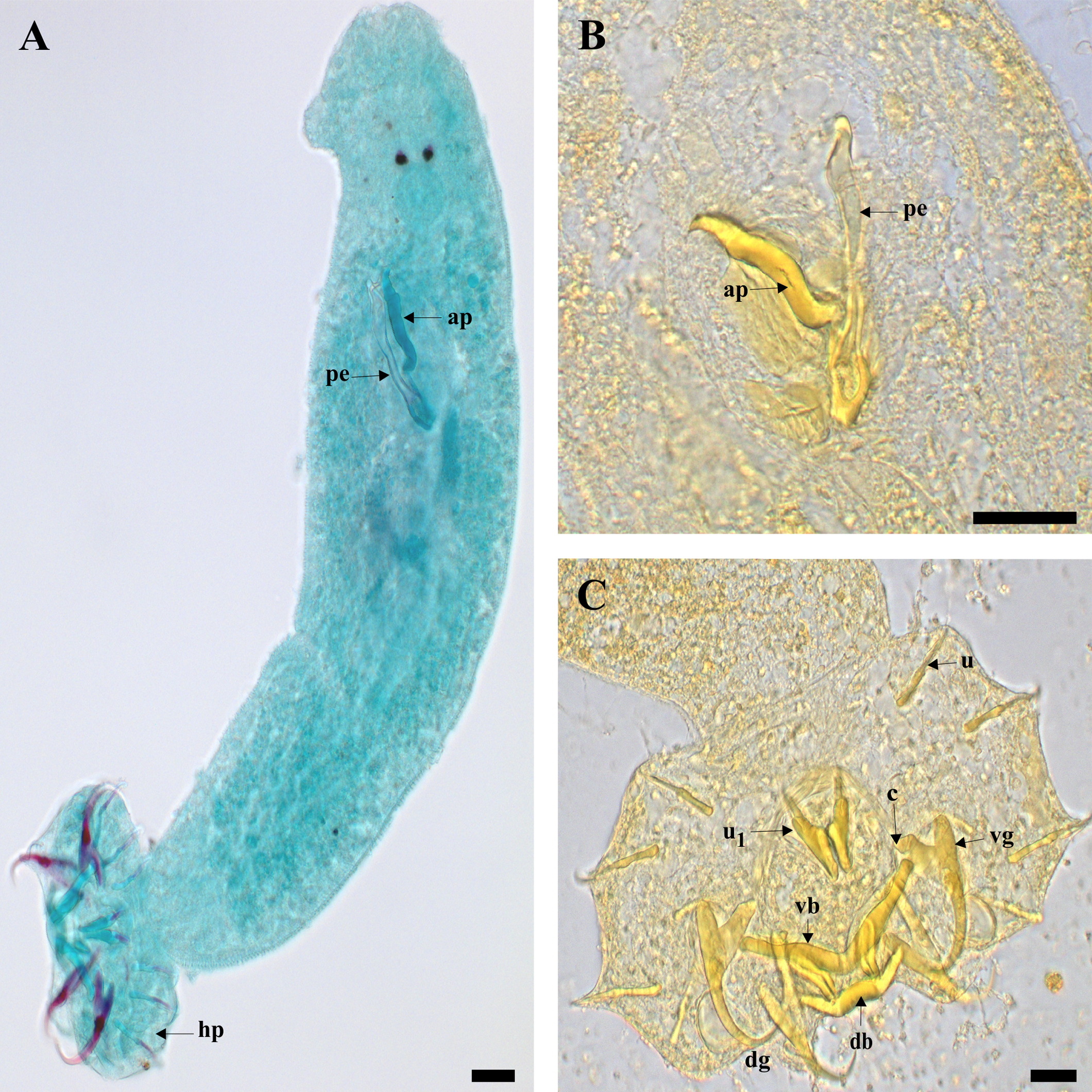

Scientific classification
- Kingdom: Animalia
- Phylum: Platyhelminthes
- Class: Monogenea
- Order: Dactylogyridea
- Family: Ancyrocephalidae
- Genus: Cichlidogyrus
- Species: C. philander

Binomial name
- Cichlidogyrus philander Douëllou, 1993

= Cichlidogyrus philander =

Species of flatworm

Cichlidogyrus philander is a species of monopisthocotylean monogenean, in the family Ancyrocephalidae. It is ectoparasitic on the gills of the fish Pseudocrenilabrus philander.

The species has been described by Laurence Douëllou in 1993 from fish collected in Lake Kariba, Zimbabwe. A complete and detailed redescription of the species, using scanning electron microscopy in addition to traditional microscopy, has been done by Igeh, Dos Santos & Avenant-Oldewage in 2017. These authors used specimens collected from the same fish species, from Padda Dam, Gauteng, South Africa.

Genetic characters derived from the 28S rDNA, the COI mitochondrial DNA and ITS1 rDNA regions distinguish C. philander from all other Cichlidogyrus sequenced species.

== Morphology ==
Cichlidogyrus philander is characterised by a penis with a sharp, curved, lateral termination, an accessory piece with a hook-like extremity that may appear forked terminally, and lack of a visible vagina. The transverse bars of the haptor have concave and convex surfaces with ribs on the concave surface. The dorsal bar of the haptor bears fenestrations at the base of the auricles and the ventral and dorsal gripi are dissimilar. The large first pair of uncinuli shows lateral wings on the left side of the base. On top of this wing, a ball-like structure with a small fenestration is visible.

== Images of Cichlidogyrus philander in scanning electron microscopy ==
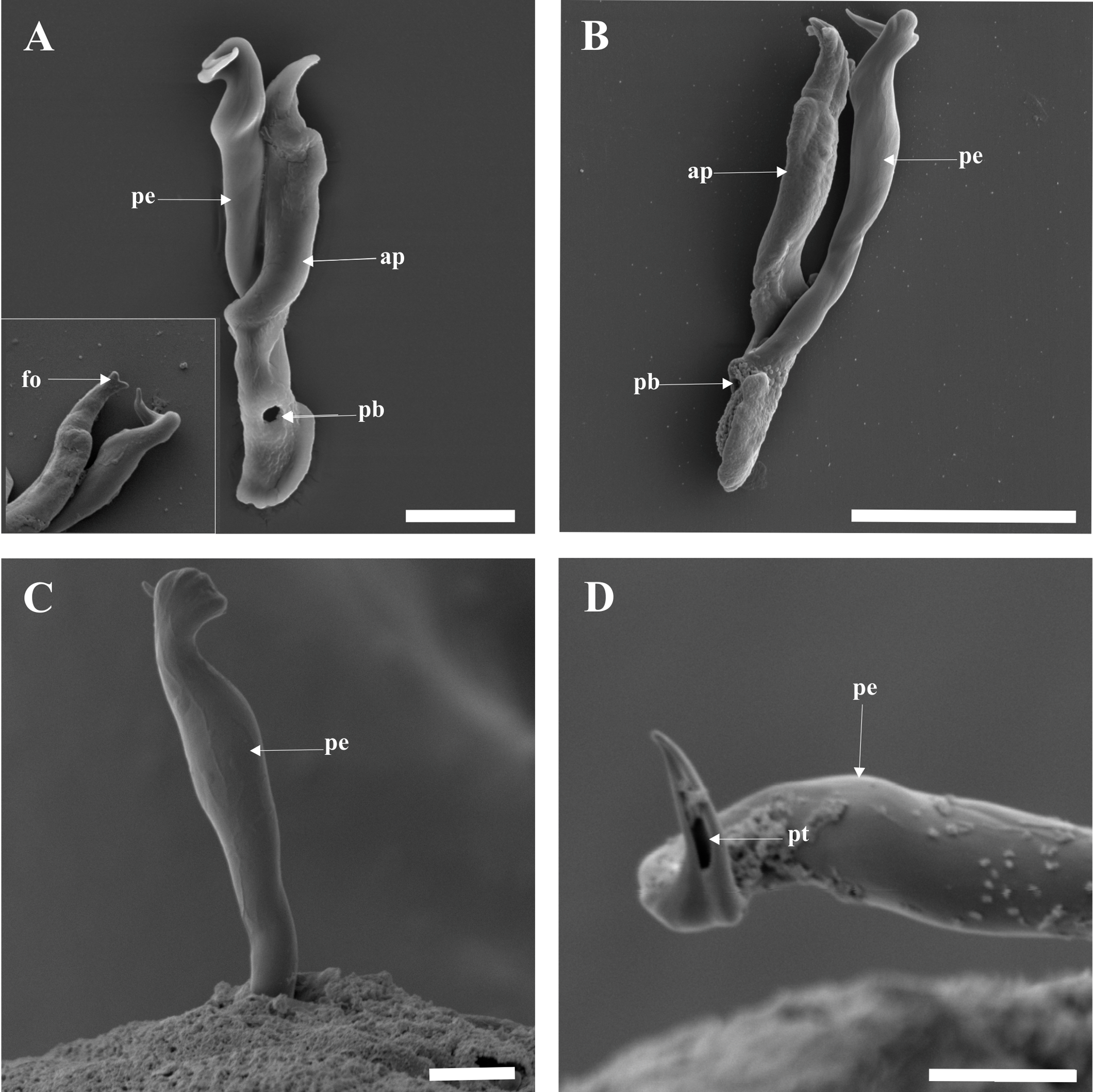
Male copulatory organ, scanning electron microscopy

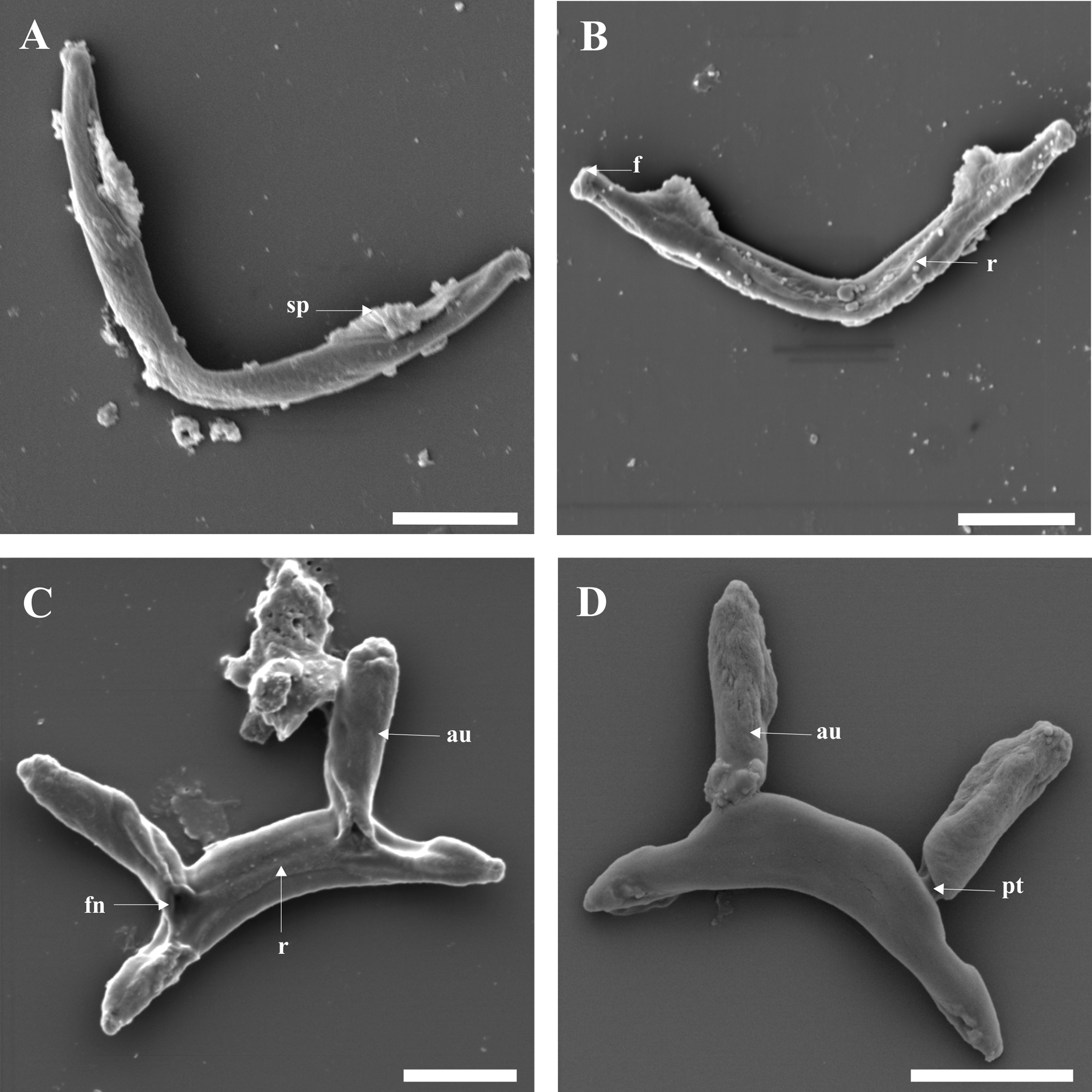
Ventral and dorsal bars of the haptor, scanning electron microscopy

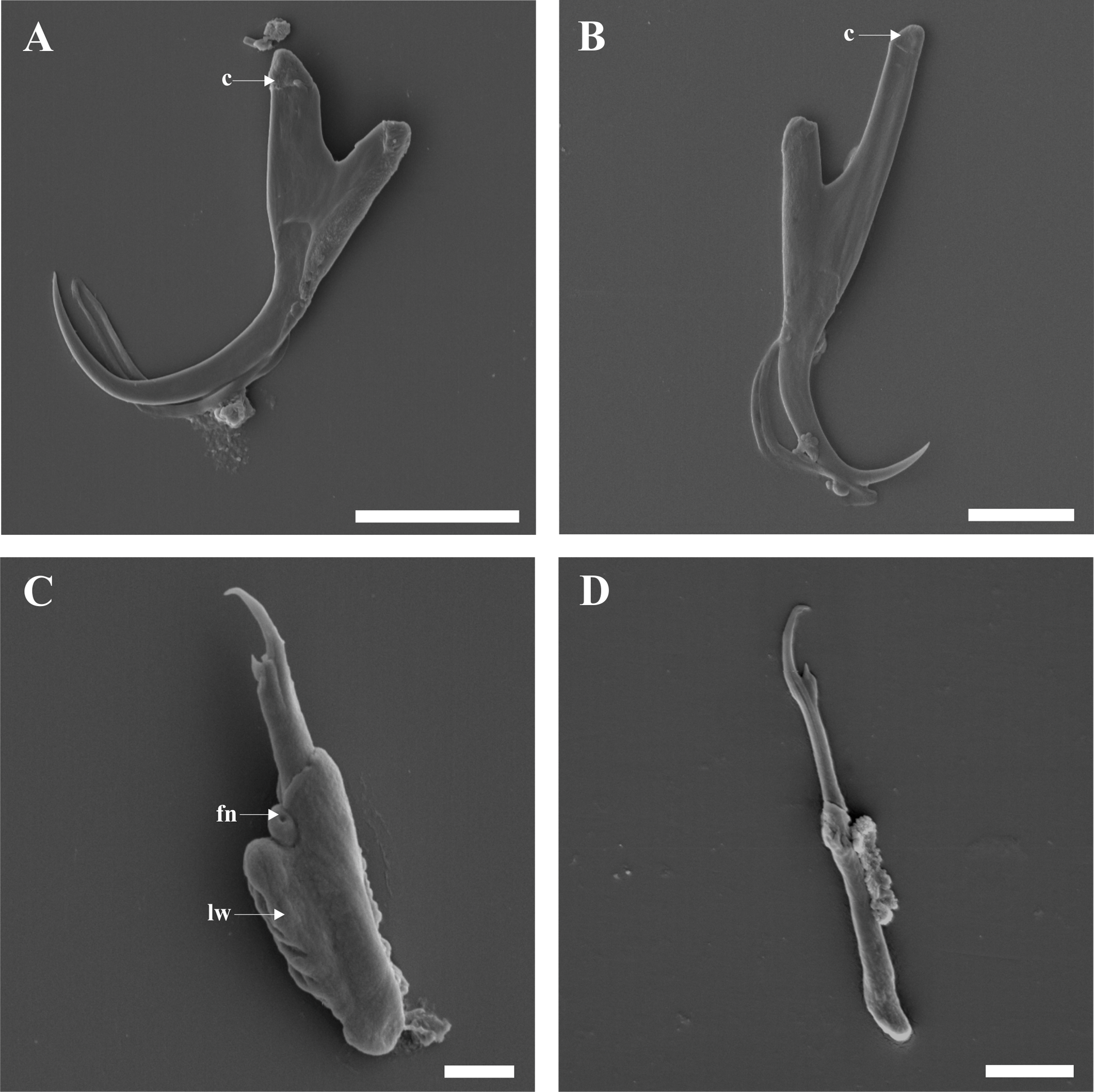
Gripi and uncinuli in the haptor, scanning electron microscopy
