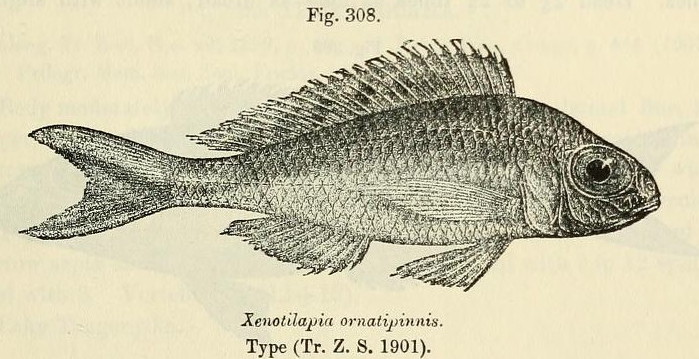

Conservation status
- Least Concern (IUCN 3.1)

Scientific classification
- Kingdom: Animalia
- Phylum: Chordata
- Class: Actinopterygii
- Order: Cichliformes
- Family: Cichlidae
- Genus: Xenotilapia
- Species: X. ornatipinnis

Binomial name
- Xenotilapia ornatipinnis Boulenger, 1901

= Xenotilapia ornatipinnis =

Species of fish

Xenotilapia ornatipinnis is a species of cichlid endemic to Lake Tanganyika where it can be found in schools in areas with sandy substrates. This species can reach a length of 12.5 centimetres (4.9 in) TL. It can also be found in the aquarium trade.
