= Xenotilapia boulengeri =

Conservation status
- Least Concern (IUCN 3.1)

Scientific classification
- Kingdom: Animalia
- Phylum: Chordata
- Class: Actinopterygii
- Order: Cichliformes
- Family: Cichlidae
- Genus: Xenotilapia
- Species: X. boulengeri

Binomial name
- Xenotilapia boulengeri (Poll, 1942)

Synonyms
- Enantiopus boulengeri Poll, 1942; Parectodus lestradei Poll, 1942; Xenotilapia lestradei (Poll, 1942); Xenotilapia materfamilias Poll, 1943; Xenotilapia mater-familias Poll, 1943

Species of fish

Xenotilapia boulengeri is a species of cichlid endemic to Lake Tanganyika where it occurs in schools in areas with sandy substrates. Its diet consists of small shrimps and copepods. This species can reach a length of 15.3 centimetres (6.0 in) TL. It can also be found in the aquarium trade. The specific name honours the Belgian-British zoologist George Albert Boulenger (1858-1937), in recognition of his world on the fishes of Lake Tanganyika.
