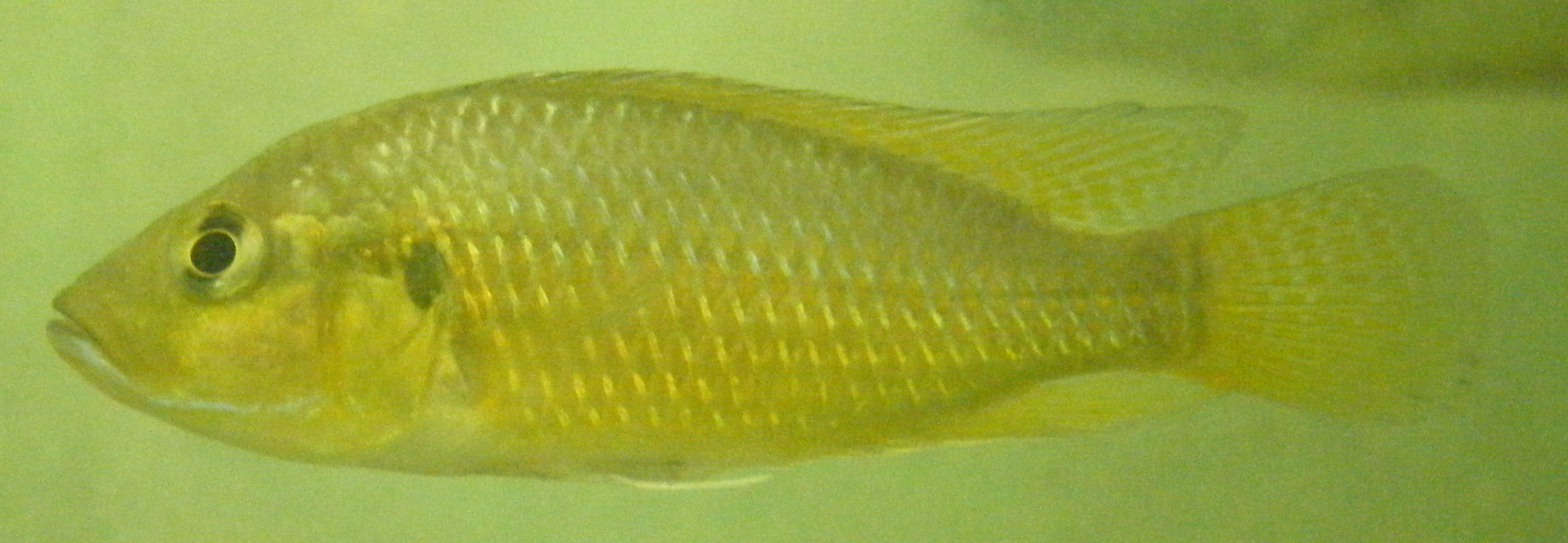

Conservation status
- Least Concern (IUCN 3.1)

Scientific classification
- Kingdom: Animalia
- Phylum: Chordata
- Class: Actinopterygii
- Division: Teleostei
- Order: Cichliformes
- Family: Cichlidae
- Subfamily: Pseudocrenilabrinae
- Tribe: Haplochromini
- Genus: Pseudocrenilabrus
- Species: P. philander

Binomial name
- Pseudocrenilabrus philander (M. C. W. Weber, 1897)

Synonyms
- Chromis philander Weber, 1897; Haplochromis philander (Weber, 1897); Paratilapia luebberti Hilgendorf, 1902; Pseudocrenilabrus natalensis Fowler, 1934; Tilapia ellenbergeri Gilchrist & Thompson, 1917; Tilapia philander (Weber, 1897)

= Pseudocrenilabrus philander =

Species of fish

Pseudocrenilabrus philander or the southern mouth-brooder is a small species of haplochromine cichlid found in southern and central Africa. It was first described by the German-Dutch zoologist Max Carl Wilhelm Weber in 1897.

== Distribution ==
Southern Africa from the Orange River system and southern Natal northwards up to the southern tributaries of the Congo and lagoons and rivers associated with Lake Malawi, but it does not occur in the lake itself. Also in Lake Rukwa.

== Subspecies ==
Three subspecies are generally accepted but there are isolated populations in a number of areas which may be distinct enough to be classified as subspecies. The three subspecies are

- Pseudocrenilabrus philander philander (Weber. 1897), native to streams flowing towards the Indian Ocean from the Zambezi River Delta southward to the vicinity of the city of Durban, South Africa.
- Pseudocrenilabrus philander dispersus (Trewavas, 1936), native to streams flowing towards the Atlantic Ocean from the Orange River in South Africa northwards to the upper tributaries of the Congo River.
- Pseudocrenilabrus philander luebberti (Hilgendorf, 1902), limited to the Otavi Pan in Namibia.

== Habitat ==
It has a wide tolerance and can be found in a variety of habitats, including streams, lakes, ponds and sinkholes. Some populations exist in slightly brackish conditions. It usually prefers vegetated zones.

== Biology ==
The prey consists of insects, shrimps and even small fish. Breeding occurs from early spring to late summer; the male fish defend a territory, construct a simple cleared nest in the substrate and attract gravid females. The eggs are laid in the nest, fertilized by the male and collected by the female. The females withdraws to a nursery to incubate the eggs in her mouth for 12–14 days at 26 °C (79 °F), releasing the fry after which she guards them for 5–7 days, sheltering them in her mouth when approached by predators. Pseudocrenilabrus philander prefers to remain close to the substrate, only rarely moving higher than 1 m (3 ft 3 in) above the bottom. Most of its food is obtained from foraging through the substrate, though small swimming prey such as zooplankton are taken when the opportunity to do so arises. In shallow water, individuals will rise to the surface to seize stranded terrestrial insects such as ants or termites.

== Aquaria ==
It is uncommon as an aquarium fish, many populations are confused with its cogener Pseudocrenilabrus multicolor, because Pseudocrenilabrus philander is so variable and some populations resemble its northern cousin. It is relatively easy to keep and breed in the aquarium.

== Naming ==
Pseudocrenilabrus philander was described by Max Carl Wilhelm Weber in 1897 as Chromis philander, from specimens taken in the Umhloti river in KwaZulu-Natal; the genus Pseudocrenilabrus was named by the American ichthyologist Henry Weed Fowler in 1934 with P. philander as the type species, under the junior synonyms Pseudocrenilabrus natalensis. The generic name is a compound of the Greek "pseudes" meaning false, Latin crenulatus meaning cut and Latin "labrum" meaning lip while the specific name is derived from the Greek "philandros" meaning "one who loves men".

== Parasites ==
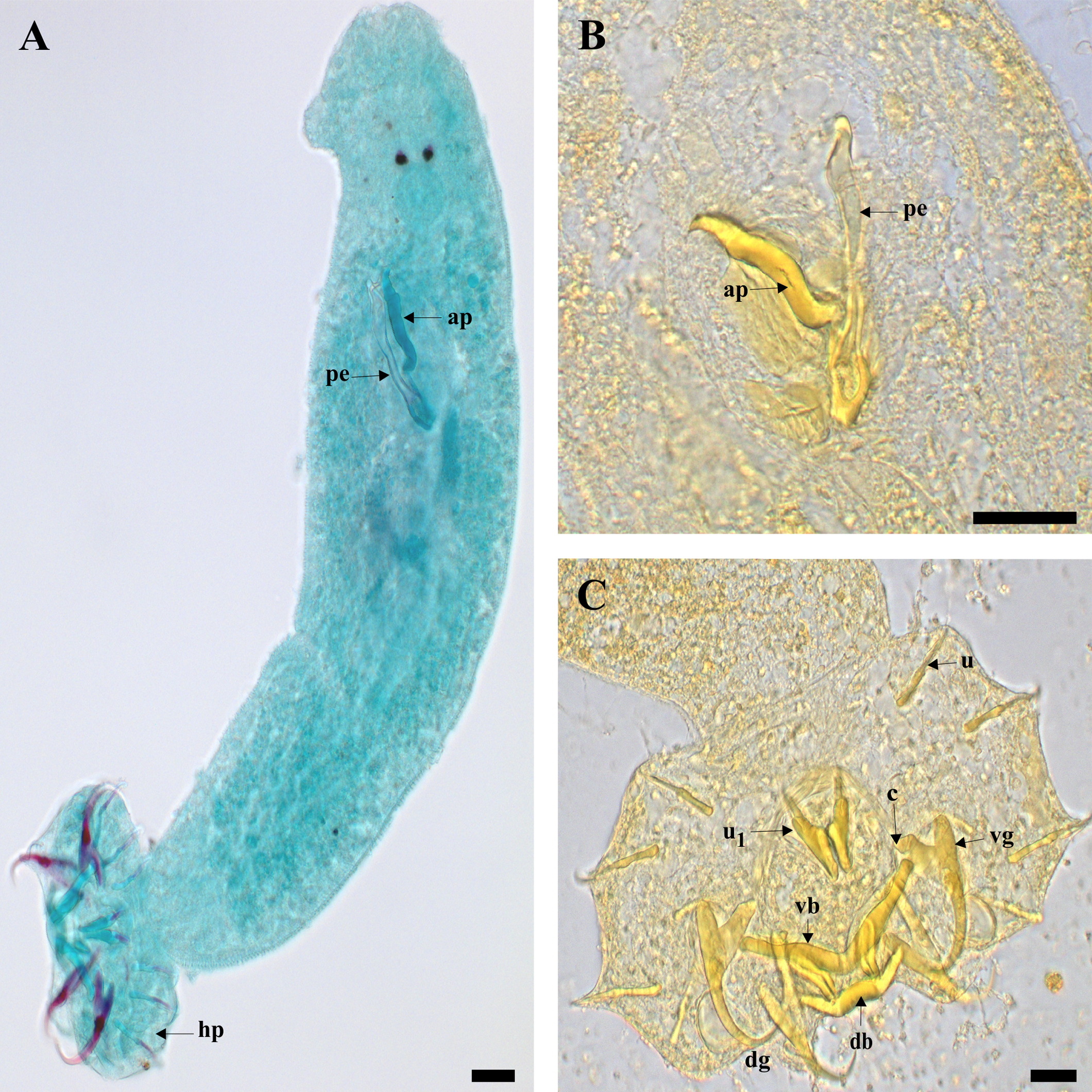
The parasitic monogenean Cichlidogyrus philander

As most fish, Pseudocrenilabrus philander harbours several species of parasites. A specific parasite on its gills is the monogenean Cichlidogyrus philander. This parasite has been recorded in the wild in fish caught in Zimbabwe and South Africa.
