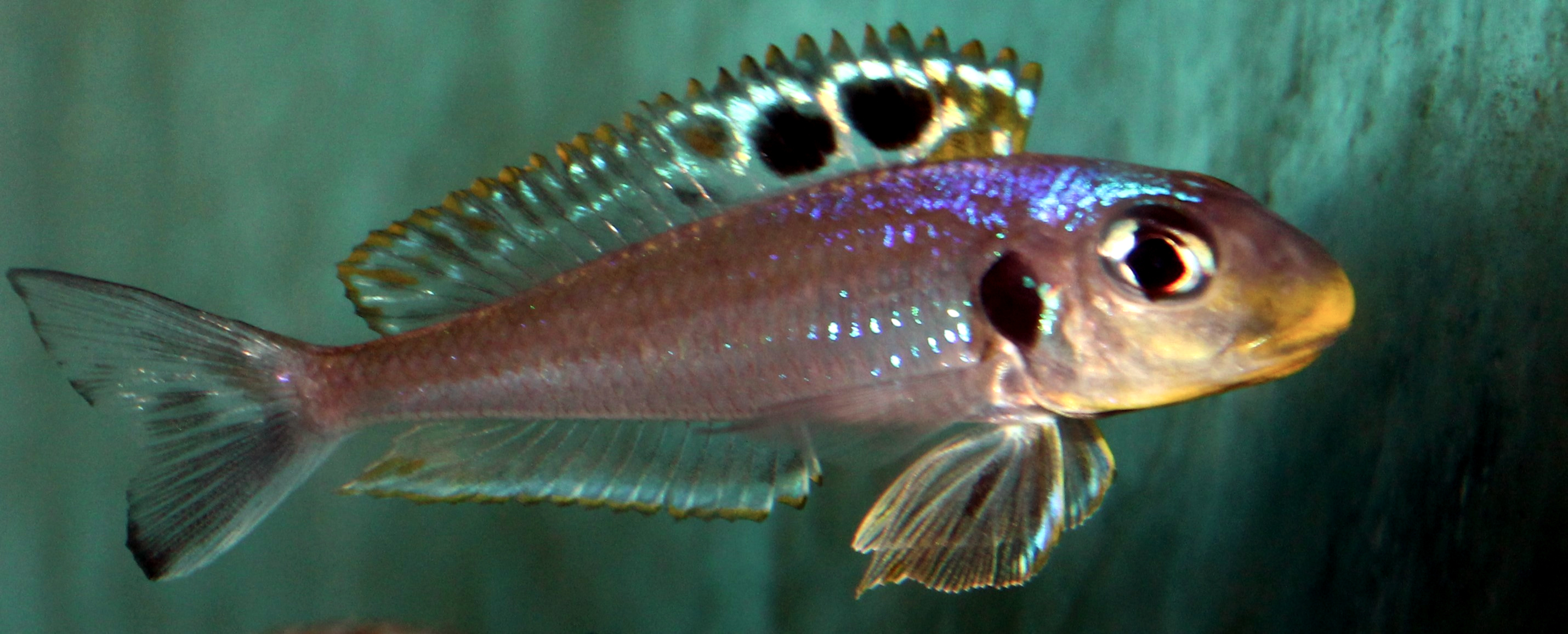

Conservation status
- Least Concern (IUCN 3.1)

Scientific classification
- Kingdom: Animalia
- Phylum: Chordata
- Class: Actinopterygii
- Order: Cichliformes
- Family: Cichlidae
- Genus: Xenotilapia
- Species: X. bathyphila

Binomial name
- Xenotilapia bathyphila Poll, 1956

Synonyms
- Xenotilapia ochrogenys bathyphilus Poll, 1956; Xenotilapia bathyphilus Poll, 1956

= Xenotilapia bathyphila =

Species of fish

Xenotilapia bathyphila is a species of cichlid endemic to Lake Tanganyika where it occurs in schools in areas with sandy substrates. It feeds on small shrimps and copepods. This species can reach a length of 10.3 centimetres (4.1 in) TL. It can also be found in the aquarium trade.
