= Cichlidogyrus attenboroughi =

Scientific classification
- Kingdom: Animalia
- Phylum: Platyhelminthes
- Class: Monogenea
- Order: Dactylogyridea
- Family: Ancyrocephalidae
- Genus: Cichlidogyrus
- Species: C. attenboroughi

Binomial name
- Cichlidogyrus attenboroughi Kmentová, Gelnar, Koblmüller & Vanhove, 2016

Species of flatworm

Cichlidogyrus attenboroughi is a species of monopisthocotylean monogeneans in the family Ancyrocephalidae (or Dactylogyridae according to certain classifications). It is a parasite of the gills of the fish Benthochromis horii in Lake Tanganyika.

== Etymology ==
According to Kmentová, Gelnar, Koblmüller & Vanhove, "the species epithet honours the English scientist and broadcaster Sir David Frederick Attenborough, in gratitude for the insights and inspiration he gave to so many people to study and protect nature and biodiversity".

== See also ==
- List of things named after David Attenborough and his works
