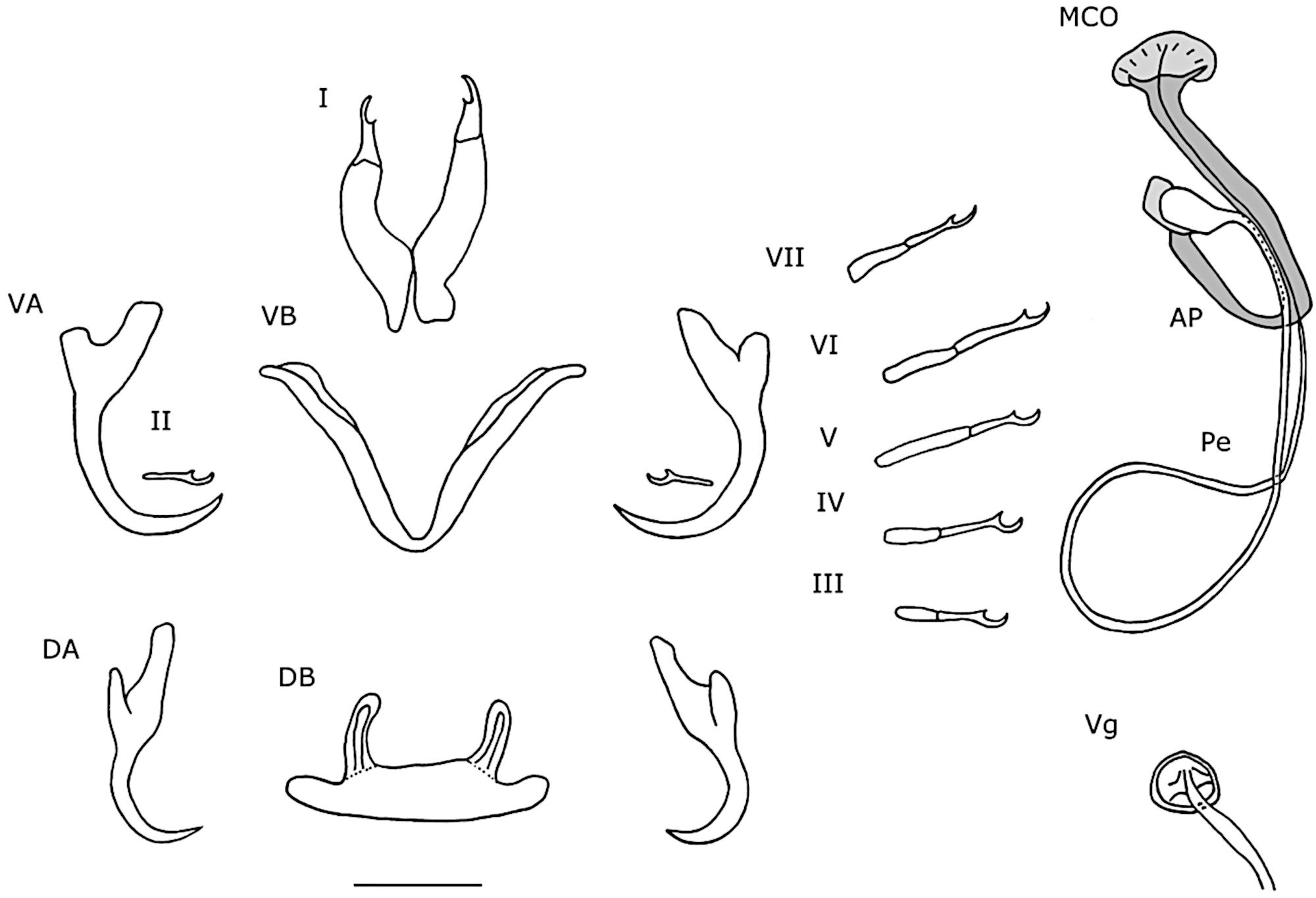

Scientific classification
- Kingdom: Animalia
- Phylum: Platyhelminthes
- Class: Monogenea
- Order: Dactylogyridea
- Family: Ancyrocephalidae
- Genus: Cichlidogyrus
- Species: C. kmentovae

Binomial name
- Cichlidogyrus kmentovae Jorissen, Pariselle & Vanhove in Jorissen et al., 2018

= Cichlidogyrus kmentovae =

Species of flatworm

Cichlidogyrus kmentovae is a species of monopisthocotylean monogenean in the family Ancyrocephalidae (or Dactylogyridae according to certain classifications). It is a parasite of the gills of the fish Hemichromis stellifer (Perciforme, Cichlidae) of the lower Basin of River Congo.

== Etymology ==
According to Jorissen et al. (2018), the specific epithet kmentovae refers to "biologist Nikol Kmentová (Czech Republic), an enthusiastic researcher on the monogenean fauna of Lake Tanganyika".
