= Xenotilapia spiloptera =

Conservation status
- Data Deficient (IUCN 3.1)

Scientific classification
- Kingdom: Animalia
- Phylum: Chordata
- Class: Actinopterygii
- Order: Cichliformes
- Family: Cichlidae
- Genus: Xenotilapia
- Species: X. spiloptera

Binomial name
- Xenotilapia spiloptera Poll & D. J. Stewart, 1975

Species of fish

Xenotilapia spiloptera is a species of cichlid endemic to Lake Tanganyika where it prefers areas with sandy substrates. This species can reach a length of 9.6 centimetres (3.8 in) TL. It can also be found in the aquarium trade.
