= Microdontochromis rotundiventralis =

Conservation status
- Least Concern (IUCN 3.1)

Scientific classification
- Kingdom: Animalia
- Phylum: Chordata
- Class: Actinopterygii
- Order: Cichliformes
- Family: Cichlidae
- Genus: Microdontochromis
- Species: M. rotundiventralis

Binomial name
- Microdontochromis rotundiventralis Takahashi, Yanagisawa Nakaya, 1997

Synonyms
- Xenotilapia rotundiventralis (Takahashi, Yanagisawa & Nakaya, 1997)

Species of fish

Xenotilapia rotundiventralis is a species of cichlid endemic to the African Great Lake Lake Tanganyika where it occurs in the southern and southeastern parts of the lake. It is found in shallow areas with a mainly sandy substrate interspersed with rocks. It forms schools which can number more than one thousand individuals. It feeds exclusively on plankton by picking out individual food items with their protractile mouths. Both sexes mouthbrood although up to 6 mm (0.24 in) in length, the fry are mouthbrooded only by the female. If the young are separated from their parents they can be found among other cichlid broods e.g. Lepidiolamprologus elongatus and Perissodus microlepis.
