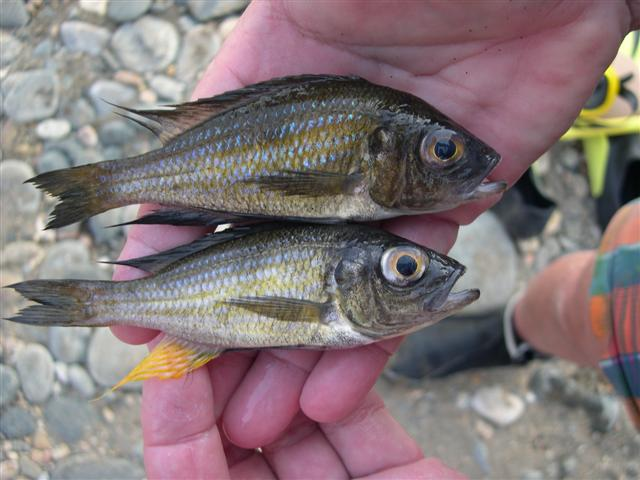

Conservation status
- Least Concern (IUCN 3.1)

Scientific classification
- Kingdom: Animalia
- Phylum: Chordata
- Class: Actinopterygii
- Order: Cichliformes
- Family: Cichlidae
- Subfamily: Pseudocrenilabrinae
- Tribe: Ectodini
- Genus: Aulonocranus; Regan, 1920
- Species: A. dewindti

Binomial name
- Aulonocranus dewindti (Boulenger, 1899)

Synonyms
- Paratilapia dewindti Boulenger, 1899; Paratilapia lukugae Boulenger, 1919

= Aulonocranus =

Genus of fishes

Aulonocranus dewindti is a species of cichlid endemic to Lake Tanganyika and some rivers which flow into it.

== Description ==
Aulonocranus dewindti has a body shape that is moderately elongated and compressed, with the length of the body being roughly three times its height. The ventral fins have a long filamentous, the first spine which reaches the anal fin in adult males. The caudal fin us crescent-shaped. There are 33-36 scales along the longest line of the body. There is a system of sensory pores on the head region and there are two lateral lines. The lower pharyngeal bone is triangular in shape and has very fine subconical teeth, the mouth is terminal slightly protruding lower jaw. The teeth in the jaws are very small and conical and are arranged in 2-3 rows on each jaw. The body is silvery in colour and the males are marked with longitudinal yellow stripes. The total length is 12 centimetres (4.7 in).

== Distribution ==
Aulonocranus dewindti is endemic to the Lake Tanganyika basin where it is widespread in the lake as well as also being found in the Ruzizi and Lukuga rivers which drain into the lake. It occurs in Burundi, the Democratic Republic of the Congo, Tanzania and Zambia.

== Habitat and biology ==
Aulonocranus dewindti is a mouthbrooder, the female broods the eggs and fry up to 1.63 centimetres (0.64 in) in her mouth. It feeds on plankton over sandy substrates and can occur in large schools.

== Taxonomy and naming ==
This species is currently the only known member of its genus. The generic name is a compound noun of the Greek αυλός (aulos) meaning "pipe" and Κρανος (kranos) meaning "helmet" alluding to the enlarged sensory canals in this species' head. The specific name honours the Belgian geologist Jean Charles Louis De Windt (1876-1898), who accidentally drowned in Lake Tanganyika at the age of 22.
