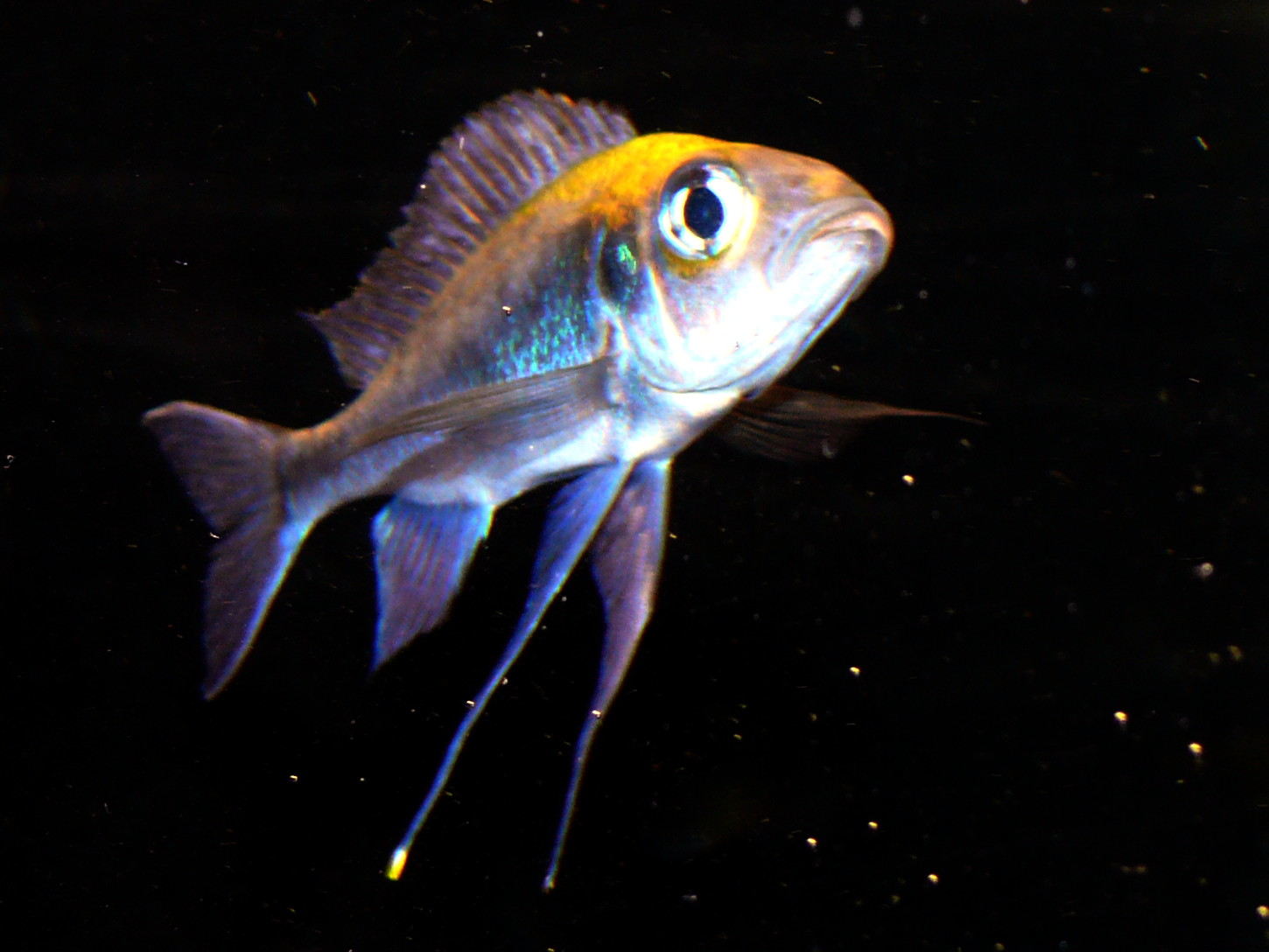

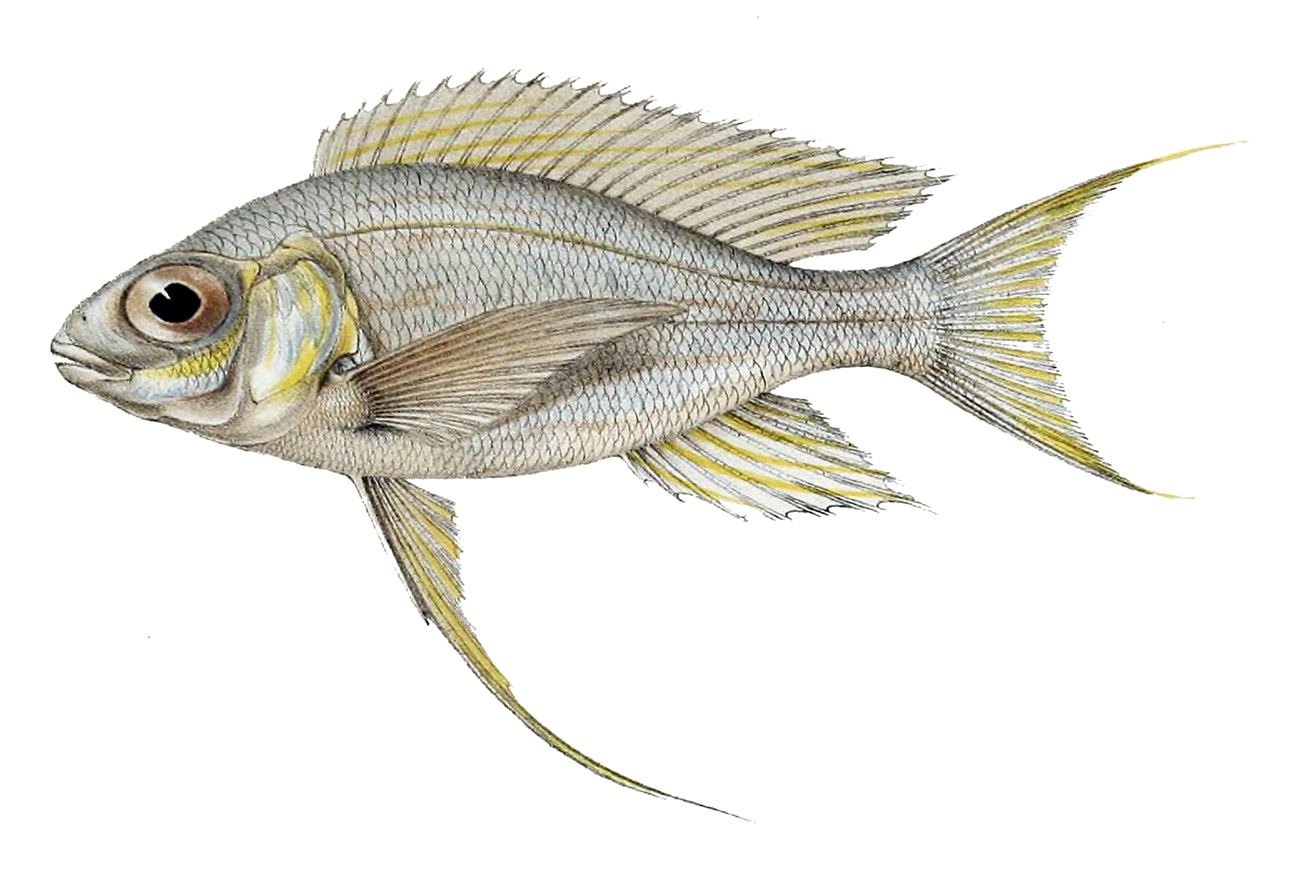

Conservation status
- Least Concern (IUCN 3.1)

Scientific classification
- Kingdom: Animalia
- Phylum: Chordata
- Class: Actinopterygii
- Order: Cichliformes
- Family: Cichlidae
- Subfamily: Pseudocrenilabrinae
- Tribe: Ectodini
- Genus: Cyathopharynx; Regan, 1906
- Species: C. furcifer

Binomial name
- Cyathopharynx furcifer (Boulenger, 1898)

Synonyms
- Paratilapia furcifer Boulenger, 1898; Cyathopharynx furcifera (Boulenger, 1898); Tilapia grandoculis Boulenger, 1899; Cyathopharynx grandoculis (Boulenger, 1899); Ectodus foae Vaillant, 1899; Ophthalmotilapia foae (Vaillant, 1899)

= Featherfin cichlid =

Species of fish

The featherfin cichlid (Cyathopharynx furcifer) is a species of cichlid endemic to Lake Tanganyika where it is found off rocky slopes. It feeds on plankton. This fish can reach a length of 21 centimetres (8.3 in) TL. It can also be found in the aquarium trade. This is currently the only species recognized in the genus by FishBase, but genetics and morphology suggest there are two valid species. The second is frequently called C. foae in the aquarium trade, but a review of the type specimen is needed to clarify if this is the correct name.
