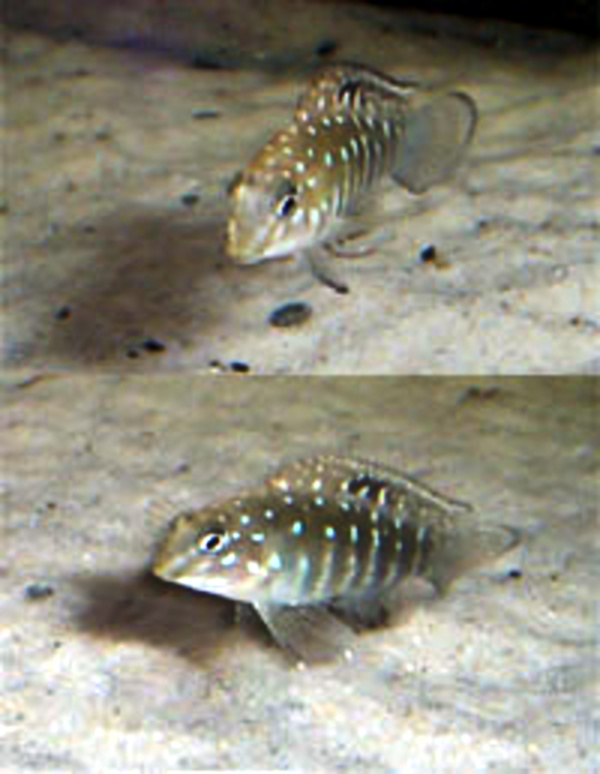
- Tanganicodus irsacae

Conservation status
- Least Concern (IUCN 3.1)

Scientific classification
- Kingdom: Animalia
- Phylum: Chordata
- Class: Actinopterygii
- Order: Cichliformes
- Family: Cichlidae
- Genus: Tanganicodus
- Species: T. irsacae

Binomial name
- Tanganicodus irsacae Poll, 1950

= Spotfin goby cichlid =

Species of fish

The spotfin goby cichlid (Tanganicodus irsacae) is an African species of cichlid endemic to Lake Tanganyika where it is only known from the northern end of the lake. They live amongst pebbles in the surf-zone. This species can reach a length of 7 centimetres (2.8 in) TL. This species can also be found in the aquarium trade. Although presently considered the only species in the genus, another undescribed species is known from the Lukuga River (Lake Tanganyika's outflow river).

== Etymology ==
The fish is named for the IRSAC, the Institut pour la Recherche Scientifique en Afrique Centrale.

== Parasites ==
The monogenean Cichlidogyrus evikae, a gill parasite, has been described from the spotfin goby cichlid.
