= Eubetia bigaulae =

Scientific classification
- Kingdom: Animalia
- Phylum: Arthropoda
- Class: Insecta
- Order: Lepidoptera
- Family: Tortricidae
- Genus: Eubetia
- Species: E. bigaulae

Binomial name
- Eubetia bigaulae Brown, 1999

Species of moth

Eubetia bigaulae is a species of moth of the family Tortricidae. It is found in Venezuela.
