= Lestradea =

Scientific classification
- Domain: Eukaryota
- Kingdom: Animalia
- Phylum: Chordata
- Class: Actinopterygii
- Order: Cichliformes
- Family: Cichlidae
- Subfamily: Pseudocrenilabrinae
- Tribe: Ectodini
- Genus: Lestradea; Poll, 1943

Type species
- Lestradea perspicax Poll, 1943

Genus of fishes

Lestradea is a genus of East African cichlids from the Lake Tanganyikan endemic tribe Ectodini.

== Characteristics ==
The species in Lestradea have a spindle-shaped, elongated body which is 3.5-4 times longer than it is high. Their dorsal fin has 13-16 spines and 13-16 rays, while the anal fin has 3 spines and 9-11 rays. The outermost ray in the ventral fins is elongated. They have two lateral lines. They have silvery coloured bodies, with sexually mature males having black throat and ventral fins. They grow to a total length of 12 centimetres (4.7 in). The specific name honours Arthur Lestrade (1897-1990), who collected the type of the type species of this genus as part of an important series of fishes he collected from Lake Tanganyika for the Royal Museum of Central Africa.

== Species ==
There are two species in the genus:

- Lestradea perspicax Poll, 1943
- Lestradea stappersii (Poll, 1943)
