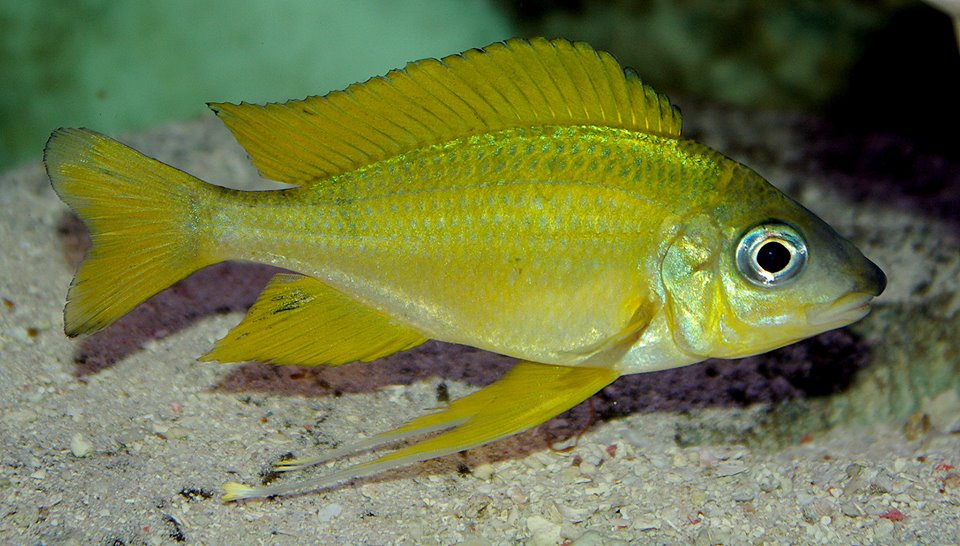

Conservation status
- Least Concern (IUCN 3.1)

Scientific classification
- Kingdom: Animalia
- Phylum: Chordata
- Class: Actinopterygii
- Order: Cichliformes
- Family: Cichlidae
- Genus: Ophthalmotilapia
- Species: O. nasuta

Binomial name
- Ophthalmotilapia nasuta (Poll & Matthes, 1962)

Synonyms
- Ophthalmochromis nasutus Poll & Matthes, 1962; Ophthalmotilapia nasutus (Poll & Matthes, 1962)

= Ophthalmotilapia nasuta =

Species of fish

Ophthalmotilapia nasuta is a species of cichlid endemic to Lake Tanganyika. It can reach a length of 20 centimetres (7.9 in) TL. It can also be found in the aquarium trade.
