= Lestradea perspicax =

Conservation status
- Least Concern (IUCN 3.1)

Scientific classification
- Kingdom: Animalia
- Phylum: Chordata
- Class: Actinopterygii
- Order: Cichliformes
- Family: Cichlidae
- Genus: Lestradea
- Species: L. perspicax

Binomial name
- Lestradea perspicax Poll, 1943

Species of fish

Lestradea perspicax is a species of cichlid endemic to Lake Tanganyika where it occurs in shallow waters over sandy substrates in the northern portion of the lake. This species can reach a length of 13.8 centimetres (5.4 in) TL. It can also be found in the aquarium trade.
