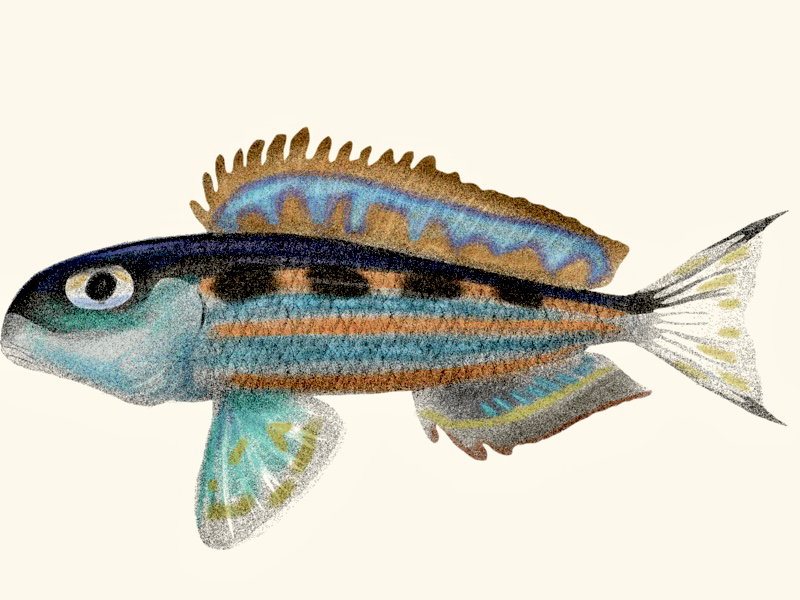
- Depiction of an individual from the Illustrated collection of fishes from Asia, Africa and Australia

Conservation status
- Least Concern (IUCN 3.1)

Scientific classification
- Kingdom: Animalia
- Phylum: Chordata
- Class: Actinopterygii
- Order: Cichliformes
- Family: Cichlidae
- Genus: Xenotilapia
- Species: X. ochrogenys

Binomial name
- Xenotilapia ochrogenys (Boulenger, 1914)

Synonyms
- Enantiopus ochrogenys Boulenger, 1914; Stappersia singularis Boulenger, 1914; Stappersetta singularis (Boulenger, 1914)

= Xenotilapia ochrogenys =

Species of fish

Xenotilapia ochrogenys is a species of cichlid endemic to Lake Tanganyika where it prefers areas with sandy substrates. This species can reach a length of 11 centimetres (4.3 in) TL. It can also be found in the aquarium trade.
