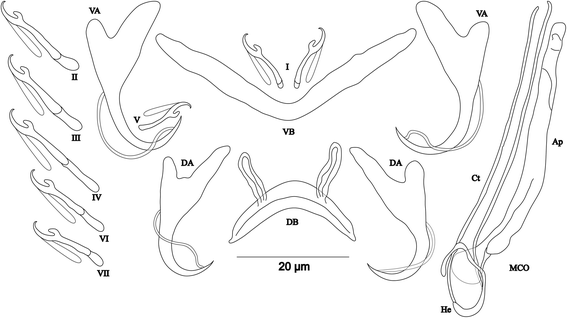

Scientific classification
- Kingdom: Animalia
- Phylum: Platyhelminthes
- Class: Monogenea
- Order: Dactylogyridea
- Family: Ancyrocephalidae
- Genus: Cichlidogyrus
- Species: C. jeanloujustinei

Binomial name
- Cichlidogyrus jeanloujustinei Rahmouni, Vanhove & Šimková, 2017

= Cichlidogyrus jeanloujustinei =

Species of flatworm

Cichlidogyrus jeanloujustinei is a species of monopisthocotylean monogenean in the family Ancyrocephalidae (or Dactylogyridae according to certain classifications). It is a parasite of the gills of the fish Eretmodus marksmithi (Perciforme, Cichlidae) in Lake Tanganyika, Burundi.

== Etymology ==
According to Rahmouni, Vanhove & Šimková, the specific epithet jeanloujustinei “honors the French parasitologist Jean-Lou Justine, Professor at the Muséum National d’Histoire Naturelle, Paris, France, who is extensively studying the systematics and biodiversity of monogeneans, digeneans, and nematodes.”
