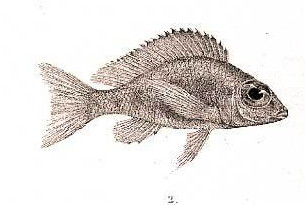
- Callochromis macrops

Scientific classification
- Kingdom: Animalia
- Phylum: Chordata
- Class: Actinopterygii
- Order: Cichliformes
- Family: Cichlidae
- Subfamily: Pseudocrenilabrinae
- Tribe: Ectodini
- Genus: Callochromis; Regan, 1920

Type species
- Paratilapia macrops Boulenger, 1898

= Callochromis =

Genus of fishes

Callochromis is a genus of cichlids native to shallow, sandy bottom areas of Lake Tanganyika in East Africa. As sandsifters, all species eat sand-dwelling invertebrates. Unlike many other sandsifters, Callochromis species are somewhat aggressive, especially when breeding. C. pleurospilus has become popular with fishkeeping hobbyists because of their compact size, iridescent colors, and hardiness.

== Characteristics ==
The fishes in the genus Callochromis have a more or less elongated body which is approximately three times as long as it is high. They have a curved or humped back and a flat underside with a small terminal or sub-terminal mouth with a protruding lower jaw, the jaws are equipped with 3-5 rows of conical teeth. The dorsal fin has 12-16 spines and 10-14 rays, the anal fin has 3 spines and 6-9 rays. The outer ray of the ventral fins is the most elongated and the caudal fin has pointed lobes. They have two lateral lines. They grow to a total length of 10–16 centimetres (3.9–6.3 in).

== Species ==
There are currently three recognized species in this genus:

- Callochromis macrops (Boulenger, 1898)
- Callochromis melanostigma (Boulenger, 1906)
- Callochromis pleurospilus (Boulenger, 1906)

A fourth species, Callochromis stappersi, which has been regarded as a junior synonym of C. pleurospilus may be a valid species.
