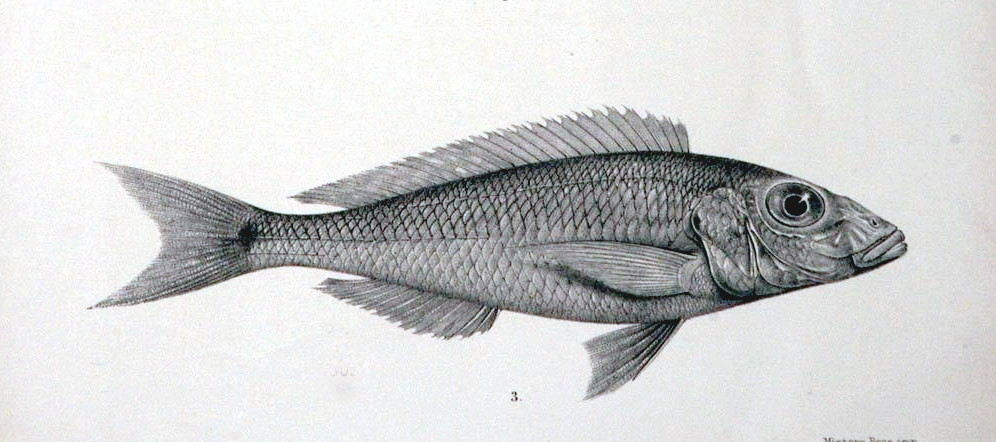

Conservation status
- Least Concern (IUCN 3.1)

Scientific classification
- Kingdom: Animalia
- Phylum: Chordata
- Class: Actinopterygii
- Order: Cichliformes
- Family: Cichlidae
- Subfamily: Pseudocrenilabrinae
- Tribe: Ectodini
- Genus: Grammatotria; Boulenger, 1899
- Species: G. lemairii

Binomial name
- Grammatotria lemairii Boulenger, 1899

= Grammatotria =

Genus of fishes

Grammatotria lemairii is a species of cichlid endemic to Lake Tanganyika in East Africa where it prefers areas with sandy substrates. This species can reach a length of 26 centimetres (10 in) TL. It is currently the only known member of its genus. The species is occasionally kept as an aquarium fish. The specific name honours Lieutenant Charles Lemaire (1863–1925) who was the leader of the Congo Free State Expedition, which collected specimens of fishes at Lake Tanganyika, including the type of G. lemairii.
