= Microdontochromis tenuidentatus =

Conservation status
- Least Concern (IUCN 3.1)

Scientific classification
- Kingdom: Animalia
- Phylum: Chordata
- Class: Actinopterygii
- Order: Cichliformes
- Family: Cichlidae
- Genus: Microdontochromis
- Species: M. tenuidentatus

Binomial name
- Microdontochromis tenuidentatus (Poll, 1951)

Synonyms
- Xenotilapia tenuidentata Poll, 1951

Species of fish

Microdontochromis tenuidentatus is a species of cichlid endemic to Lake Tanganyika where it is only known from the western shore (Democratic Republic of the Congo). This species can reach a length of 8 centimetres (3.1 in) TL. It can also be found in the aquarium trade.
