= Xenotilapia nasus =

Conservation status
- Data Deficient (IUCN 3.1)

Scientific classification
- Kingdom: Animalia
- Phylum: Chordata
- Class: Actinopterygii
- Order: Cichliformes
- Family: Cichlidae
- Genus: Xenotilapia
- Species: X. nasus

Binomial name
- Xenotilapia nasus De Vos, Risch & Thys van den Audenaerde, 1995

Species of fish

Xenotilapia nasus is a species of cichlid endemic to Lake Tanganyika. This species can reach a length of 9.3 centimetres (3.7 in) TL.
