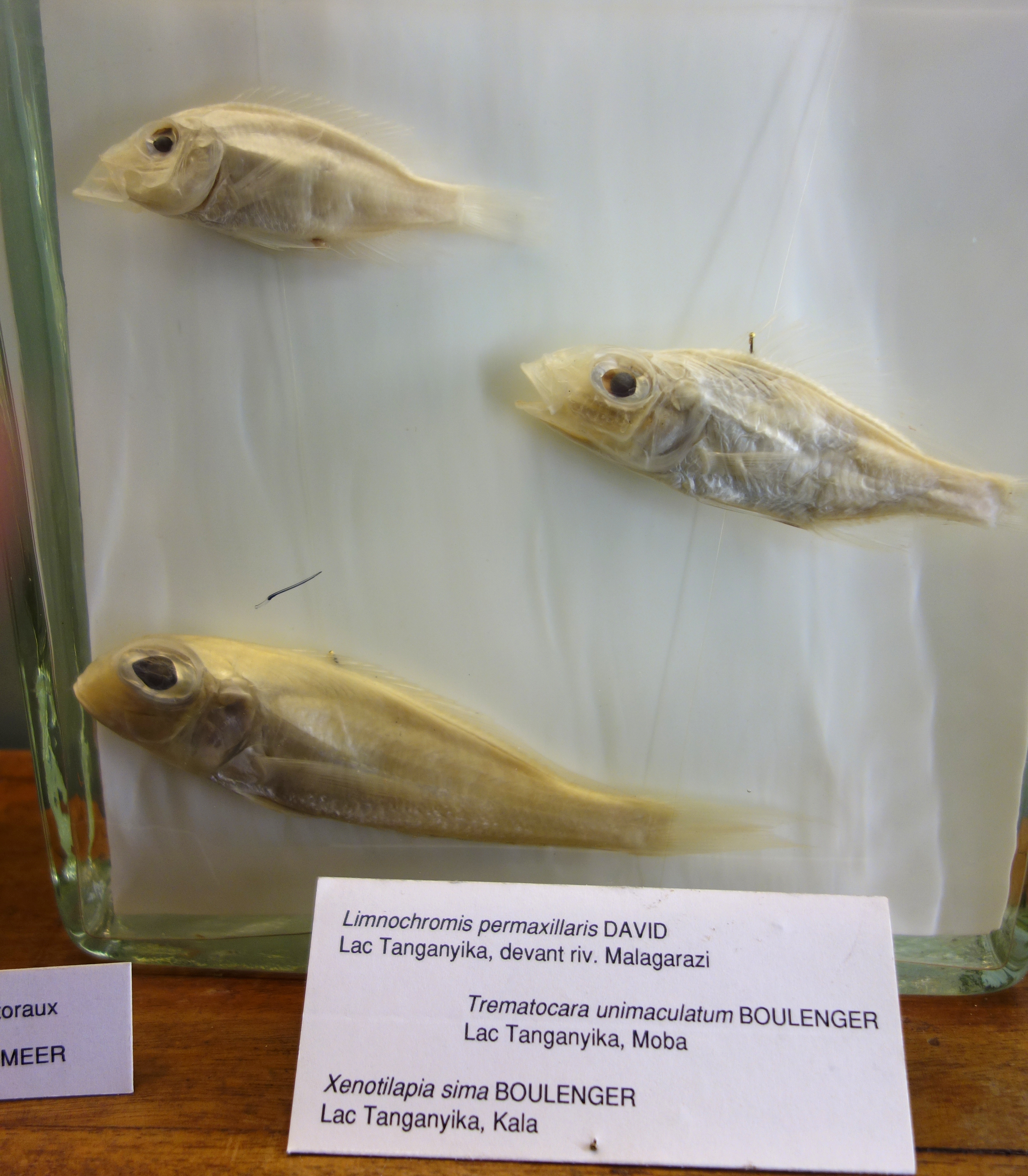
- Xenotilapia sima (bottom)

Conservation status
- Least Concern (IUCN 3.1)

Scientific classification
- Kingdom: Animalia
- Phylum: Chordata
- Class: Actinopterygii
- Order: Cichliformes
- Family: Cichlidae
- Genus: Xenotilapia
- Species: X. sima

Binomial name
- Xenotilapia sima Boulenger, 1899

= Xenotilapia sima =

Species of fish

Xenotilapia sima is a species of cichlid endemic to Lake Tanganyika where it prefers areas with sandy substrates. This species can reach a length of 16.4 centimetres (6.5 in) TL. It can also be found in the aquarium trade.
