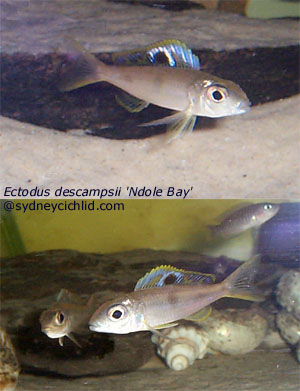
- Specimen from Ndole Bay, Zambia

Conservation status
- Vulnerable (IUCN 3.1)

Scientific classification
- Kingdom: Animalia
- Phylum: Chordata
- Class: Actinopterygii
- Order: Cichliformes
- Family: Cichlidae
- Subfamily: Pseudocrenilabrinae
- Tribe: Ectodini
- Genus: Ectodus; Boulenger, 1898
- Species: E. descampsii

Binomial name
- Ectodus descampsii Boulenger, 1898

= Ectodus =

Species of fish

Ectodus descampsii is a species of cichlid fish endemic to Lake Tanganyika in East Africa where it prefers areas with substrates of coarse sand. It feeds on micro-organisms, algae and diatoms. This species reaches a length of 10.4 centimetres (4.1 in) TL. It is also found in the aquarium trade. It is currently the only known member of its genus. The specific name honours Capitaine Georges Descamps (1855-1938), a Belgian officer in the anti-slavery movement at Lake Tanganyika.
