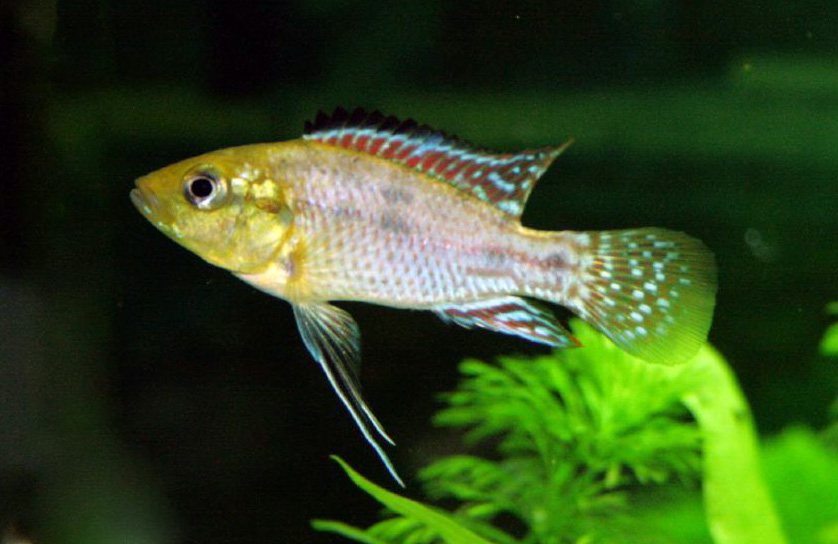
- Pseudocrenilabrus multicolor

Scientific classification
- Kingdom: Animalia
- Phylum: Chordata
- Class: Actinopterygii
- Order: Cichliformes
- Family: Cichlidae
- Tribe: Haplochromini
- Genus: Pseudocrenilabrus; Fowler, 1934

Type species
- Pseudocrenilabrus natalensis Fowler, 1934

= Pseudocrenilabrus =

Genus of fishes

Pseudocrenilabrus is a genus of fish in the family Cichlidae, commonly known as the mouthbrooders endemic to rivers and lakes in Central and Eastern Africa.

== Species ==
There are currently 4 recognized species in this genus:

- Pseudocrenilabrus multicolor (C. H. Schöller, 1903) (Egyptian mouth-brooder)
- Pseudocrenilabrus nicholsi (Pellegrin, 1928)
- Pseudocrenilabrus philander (M. C. W. Weber, 1897) (Southern mouth-brooder)
- Pseudocrenilabrus pyrrhocaudalis Katongo, Seehausen & Snoeks, 2017 (Fire-tailed pseudocrenilabrus )
