= Cichlidogyrus berminensis =

Scientific classification
- Kingdom: Animalia
- Phylum: Platyhelminthes
- Class: Monogenea
- Order: Dactylogyridea
- Family: Ancyrocephalidae
- Genus: Cichlidogyrus
- Species: C. berminensis

Binomial name
- Cichlidogyrus berminensis Pariselle, Nyom & Bilong, 2013

Species of fish

Cichlidogyrus berminensis is a species of monopisthocotylean monogenean in the family Ancyrocephalidae. It is known to infect Tilapia species, particularly Tilapia bemini, and was first found in Cameroon. Its specific epithet is derived from its type locality of Lake Bermin. It can be differentiated from its cogenerates by a short penis with a marked narrow heel, a simple and straight accessory piece that is seen to end in a large hook, and by a medium-sized pair of uncinuli.
