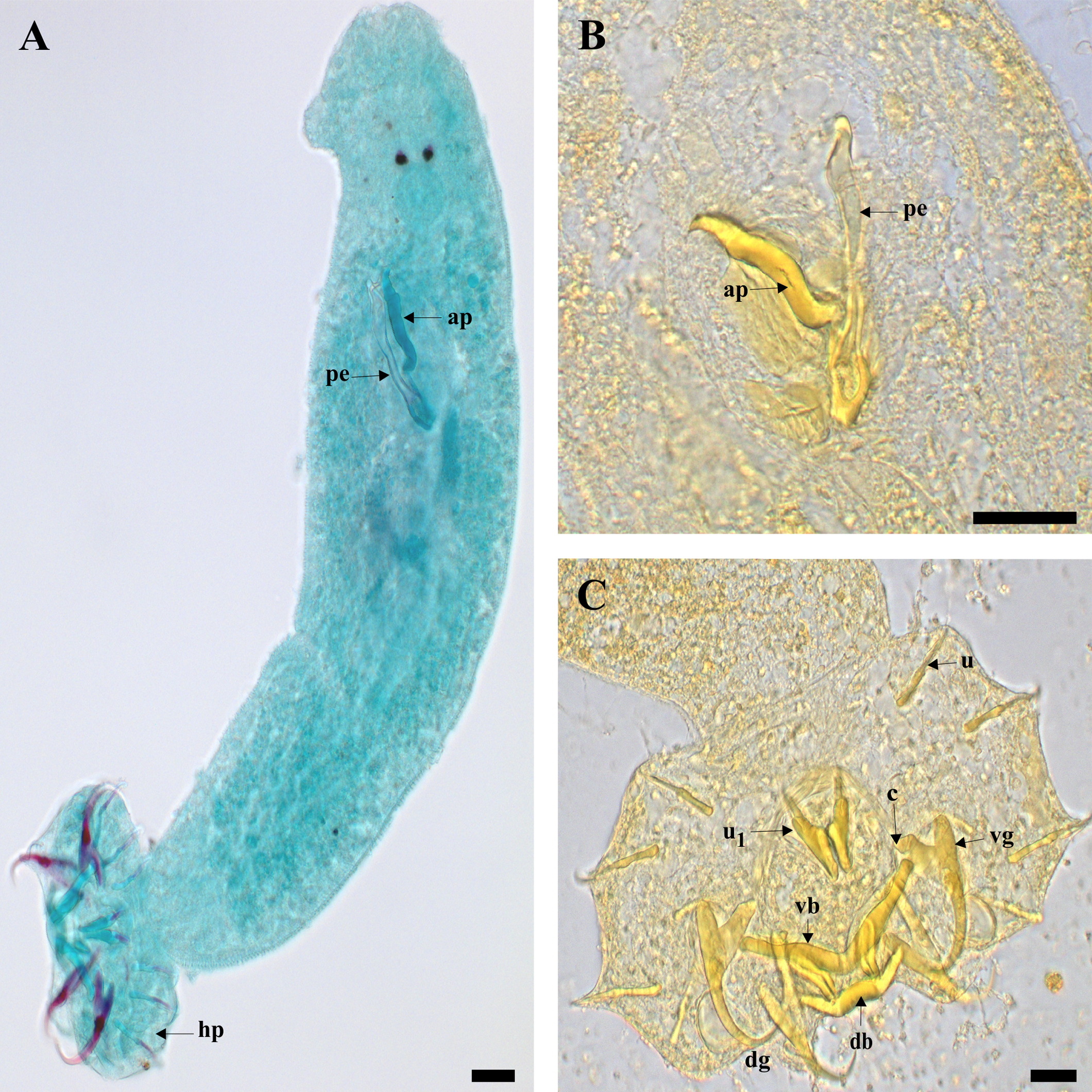
- Cichlidogyrus philander

Scientific classification
- Kingdom: Animalia
- Phylum: Platyhelminthes
- Class: Monogenea
- Order: Dactylogyridea
- Family: Ancyrocephalidae
- Genus: Cichlidogyrus; Paperna, 1960

= Cichlidogyrus =

Genus of flatworms

Cichlidogyrus is a genus of monopisthocotylean monogeneans in the family Ancyrocephalidae. The type-species of the genus is Cichlidogyrus arthracanthus Paperna, 1960, by original designation. All the species of the genus are parasites on the gills of fish, namely African Cichlidae, Nandidae and Cyprinodontidae.

Species of Cichlidogyrus are parasitic in many cichlid species in the Lake Tanganyika; a recent study (2016) has shown that species which are parasite on deep-water fish show reduced parasite-host specificity in comparison to species from littoral waters, probably an adaptation to low host availability.

According to Antoine Pariselle and Louis Euzet, 71 species of Cichlidogyrus were known in 2009 - new species have been described since. Nikol Kmentová, Milan Gelnar, Stephan Koblmüller and Maarten P.M. Vanhove estimated that the number of species was more than 100 in 2016 and Chahrazed Rahmouni, Maarten P. M. Vanhove and Andrea Šimková listed 111 species in 2017.

Species of Cichlidogyrus have been introduced in various parts of the world, as alien species, where their hosts, particularly tilapia, have been introduced.

== Species ==
Among many species, a few examples:

- Cichlidogyrus gillardinae Gillardin, 2012
- Cichlidogyrus antoineparisellei Rahmouni, Vanhove & Šimková, 2018
- Cichlidogyrus attenboroughi Kmentová, Gelnar, Koblmüller & Vanhove, 2016
- Cichlidogyrus berminensis Pariselle, Nyom & Bilong, 2013
- Cichlidogyrus centesimus Vanhove, Volckaert & Pariselle, 2011
- Cichlidogyrus dracolemma Řehulková, Mendlová & Šimková, 2013
- Cichlidogyrus evikae Rahmouni, Vanhove & Šimková, 2017
- Cichlidogyrus gillesi Pariselle, Nyom & Bilong, 2013
- Cichlidogyrus jeanloujustinei Rahmouni, Vanhove & Šimková, 2017
- Cichlidogyrus kmentovae Jorissen, Pariselle & Vanhove in Jorissen et al., 2018
- Cichlidogyrus makasai Vanhove, Volckaert & Pariselle, 2011
- Cichlidogyrus nageus Řehulková, Mendlová & Šimková, 2013
- Cichlidogyrus philander Douëllou, 1993
- Cichlidogyrus sclerosus Paperna & Thurston, 1969
- Cichlidogyrus sturmbaueri Vanhove, Volckaert & Pariselle, 2011
- Cichlidogyrus tilapiae Paperna, 1960
- Cichlidogyrus vandekerkhovei Vanhove, Volckaert & Pariselle, 2011
