= William Alfred Cunnington =

British naturalist and anthropologist (1877–1958)

William Alfred Cunnington (1877–1958) was a British naturalist and anthropologist who is mainly known for his work as a zoologist who worked primarily on crustacea.

He was a student at Christ's College, Cambridge, and was in February 1903 sent to the Zoological Station at Naples. He was a member of an expedition to Lake Tanganyika in 1904-1905 and later took part in an expedition to Bolivia and Paraguay in 1926–1927. He was a demonstrator in zoology at Cambridge University. As well as his biological studies while he was on the African expedition he took an interest in the culture of the local people and collected amy objects which he donated to a number of British museums including Reading Museum and the Pitt Rivers Museum. He has been honoured by having a number of fish species named after him, including the cichlid genus Cunningtonia.

He was honoured by the University of London in 1921 as a Doctor of Science in zoology.
