= Cichlidogyrus gillesi =

Scientific classification
- Kingdom: Animalia
- Phylum: Platyhelminthes
- Class: Monogenea
- Order: Dactylogyridea
- Family: Ancyrocephalidae
- Genus: Cichlidogyrus
- Species: C. gillesi

Binomial name
- Cichlidogyrus gillesi Pariselle, Nyom & Bilong, 2013

Species of fish

Cichlidogyrus gillesi is a species of monopisthocotylean monogenean in the family Ancyrocephalidae. It is known to infect Tilapia species, particularly Tilapia guineensis, and was first found in Cameroon. It can be differentiated from its cogenerates by a large and trapezoid heel of the penis, as well as having an S-shaped and wrinkle-walled vagina. It was named in honor of Dr. André Gilles of Aix-Marseille University.
