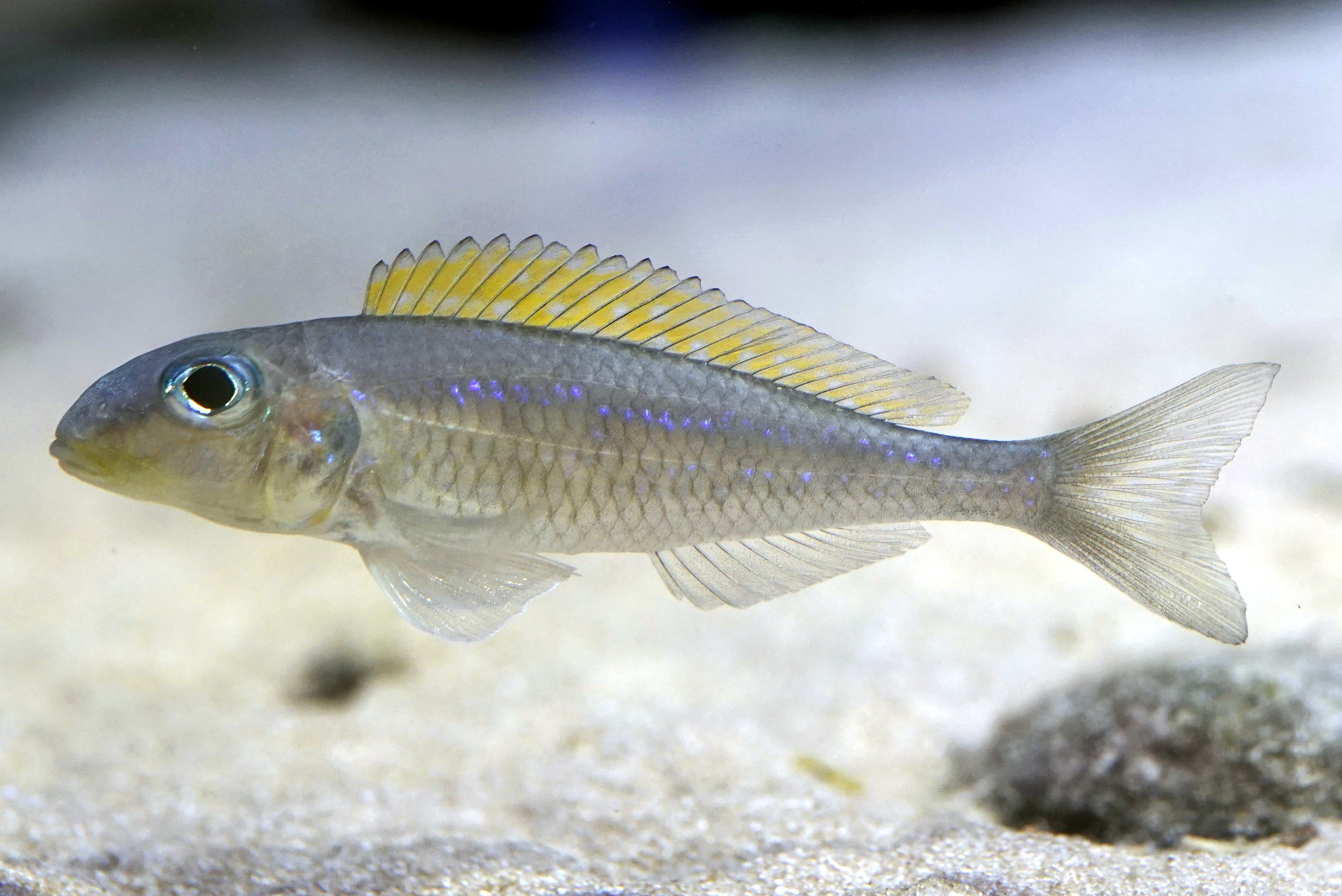

Conservation status
- Least Concern (IUCN 3.1)

Scientific classification
- Kingdom: Animalia
- Phylum: Chordata
- Class: Actinopterygii
- Order: Cichliformes
- Family: Cichlidae
- Genus: Xenotilapia
- Species: X. flavipinnis

Binomial name
- Xenotilapia flavipinnis Poll, 1985

= Yellow sand cichlid =

Species of fish

The yellow sand cichlid (Xenotilapia flavipinnis) is a species of cichlid endemic to Lake Tanganyika where it is found in schools in areas with sandy substrates. This species can reach a length of 9.2 centimetres (3.6 in) TL. It can also be found in the aquarium trade.
