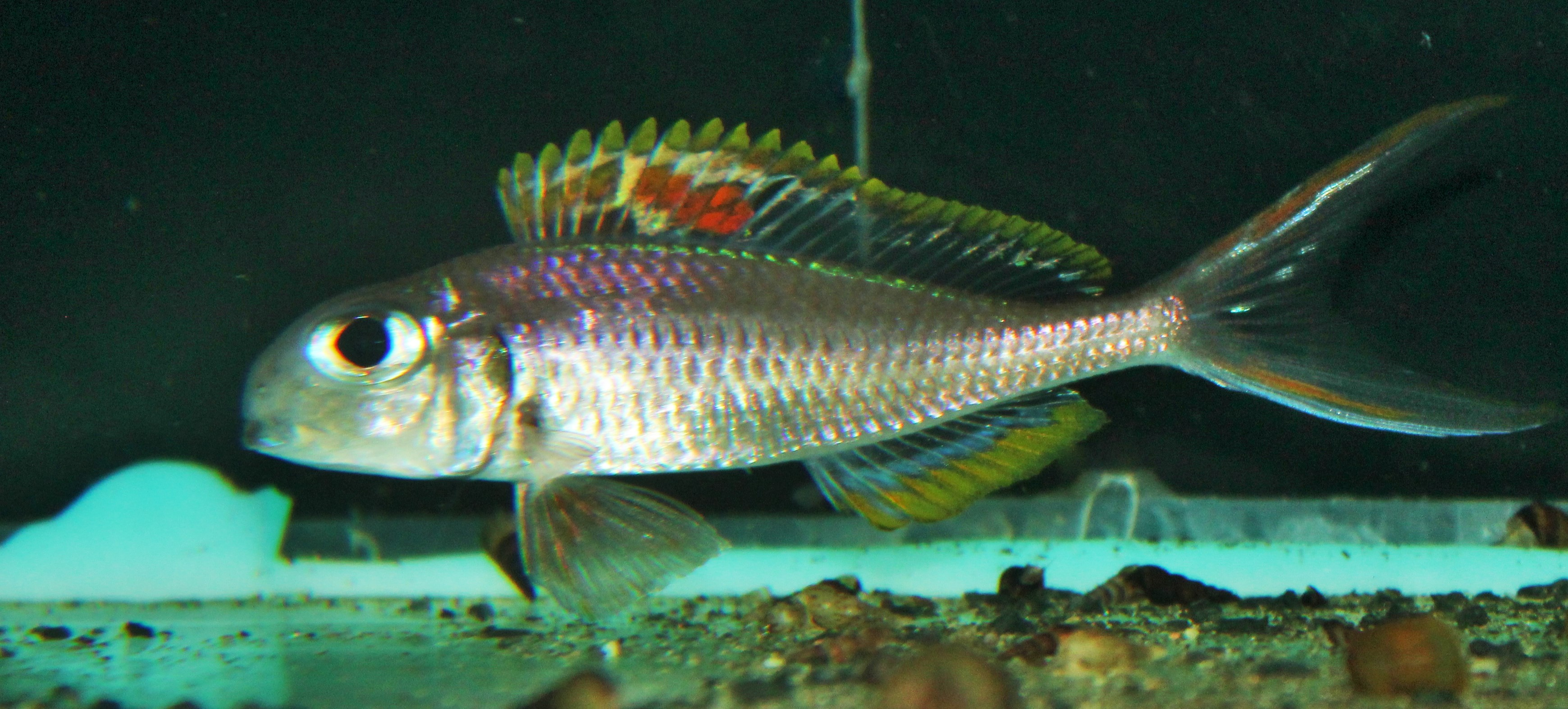

Conservation status
- Least Concern (IUCN 3.1)

Scientific classification
- Kingdom: Animalia
- Phylum: Chordata
- Class: Actinopterygii
- Order: Cichliformes
- Family: Cichlidae
- Genus: Xenotilapia
- Species: X. nigrolabiata

Binomial name
- Xenotilapia nigrolabiata Poll, 1951

= Xenotilapia nigrolabiata =

Species of fish

Xenotilapia nigrolabiata is a species of cichlid endemic to Lake Tanganyika where it prefers areas with sandy substrates. This species can reach a length of 13 centimetres (5.1 in) TL. It can also be found in the aquarium trade.
