= Lestradea stappersii =

Conservation status
- Least Concern (IUCN 3.1)

Scientific classification
- Kingdom: Animalia
- Phylum: Chordata
- Class: Actinopterygii
- Order: Cichliformes
- Family: Cichlidae
- Genus: Lestradea
- Species: L. stappersii

Binomial name
- Lestradea stappersii (Poll, 1943)

Synonyms
- Ophthalmotilapia stappersii Poll, 1943

Species of fish

Lestradea stappersii is a species of cichlid endemic to Lake Tanganyika where it occurs in the southern portion of the lake. It prefers areas with sandy substrates where it searches for microorganisms in ooze pockets in the sand. This species can reach a length of 11.7 centimetres (4.6 in) TL. It can also be found in the aquarium trade.
