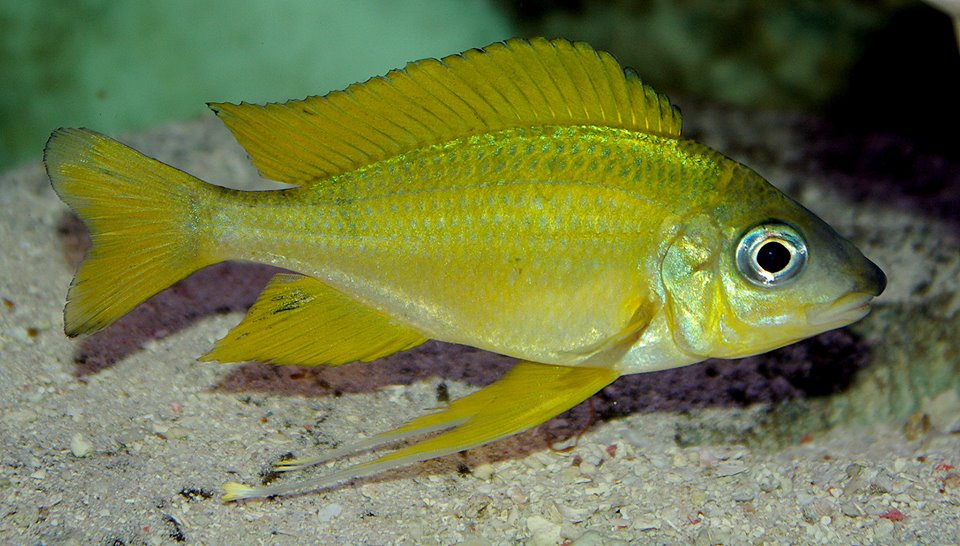
- Ophthalmotilapia nasuta

Scientific classification
- Kingdom: Animalia
- Phylum: Chordata
- Class: Actinopterygii
- Order: Cichliformes
- Family: Cichlidae
- Subfamily: Pseudocrenilabrinae
- Tribe: Ectodini
- Genus: Ophthalmotilapia; Pellegrin, 1904

Type species
- Tilapia boops Boulenger, 1901

= Ophthalmotilapia =

Genus of fishes

Ophthalmotilapia is a small genus of four cichlid species endemic to Lake Tanganyika in East Africa.

== Species ==
There are currently four recognized species in this genus:

- Ophthalmotilapia boops (Boulenger, 1901)
- Ophthalmotilapia heterodonta (Poll & Matthes, 1962)
- Ophthalmotilapia nasuta (Poll & Matthes, 1962)
- Ophthalmotilapia ventralis (Boulenger, 1898)
