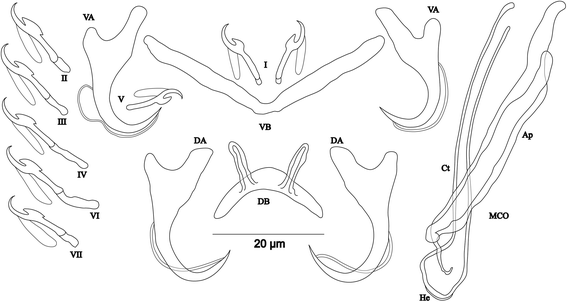

Scientific classification
- Kingdom: Animalia
- Phylum: Platyhelminthes
- Class: Monogenea
- Order: Dactylogyridea
- Family: Ancyrocephalidae
- Genus: Cichlidogyrus
- Species: C. evikae

Binomial name
- Cichlidogyrus evikae Rahmouni, Vanhove & Šimková, 2017

= Cichlidogyrus evikae =

Species of flatworm

Cichlidogyrus evikae is a species of monopisthocotylean monogenean in the family Ancyrocephalidae (or Dactylogyridae according to certain classifications). It is a parasite of the gills of the fish Tanganicodus irsacae (Perciforme, Cichlidae) in Lake Tanganyika, Burundi.

== Etymology ==
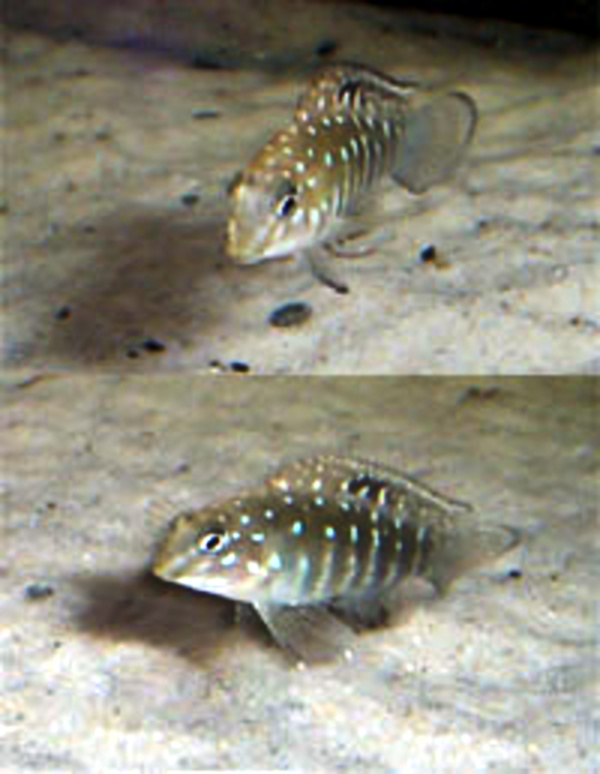
The spotfin goby cichlid (Tanganicodus irsacae) is the type-host of Cichlidogyrus evikae

According to Rahmouni, Vanhove & Šimková, “the name evikae was given in honour of the Czech parasitologist Dr. Eva Řehulková (Department of Botany and Zoology, Faculty of Science, Masaryk University, Czech Republic) who studies monogenean flatworms, for her contributions to their research.”
