= Ophthalmotilapia heterodonta =

Conservation status
- Least Concern (IUCN 3.1)

Scientific classification
- Kingdom: Animalia
- Phylum: Chordata
- Class: Actinopterygii
- Order: Cichliformes
- Family: Cichlidae
- Genus: Ophthalmotilapia
- Species: O. heterodonta

Binomial name
- Ophthalmotilapia heterodonta (Poll & Matthes, 1962)

Synonyms
- Ophthalmochromis ventralis heterodontus Poll & Matthes, 1962; Ophthalmochromis heterodontus Poll & Matthes, 1962; Ophthalmotilapia ventralis heterodonta (Poll & Matthes, 1962)

Species of fish

Ophthalmotilapia heterodonta is a species of cichlid endemic to Lake Tanganyika where it is only known from the northern end of the lake. It can reach a length of 14.4 centimetres (5.7 in) TL. It can also be found in the aquarium trade.
