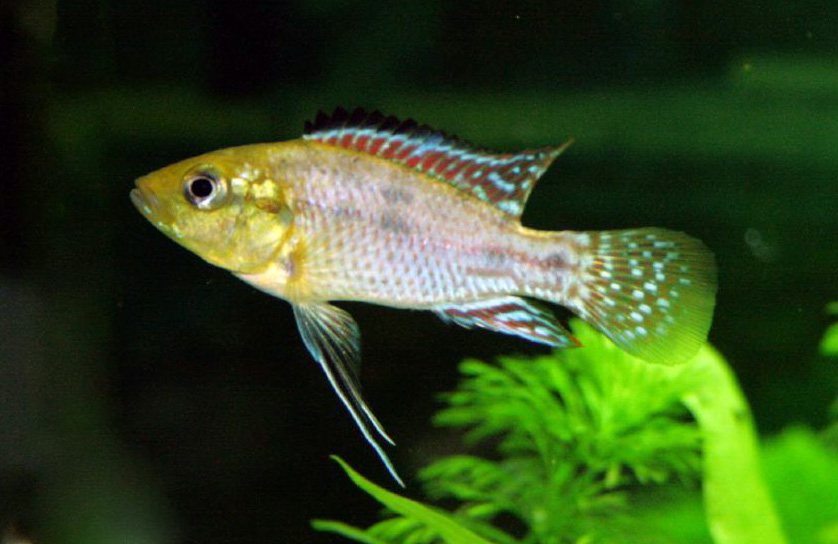
- Male Egyptian mouthbrooder
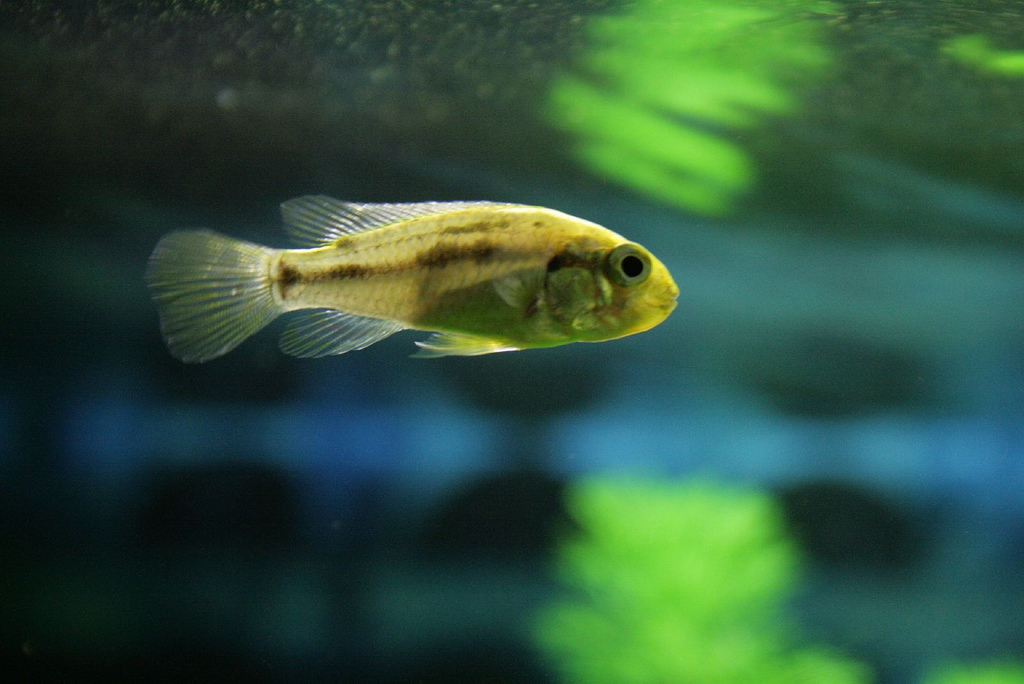
- Female Egyptian mouthbrooder

Conservation status
- Least Concern (IUCN 3.1)

Scientific classification
- Kingdom: Animalia
- Phylum: Chordata
- Class: Actinopterygii
- Order: Cichliformes
- Family: Cichlidae
- Genus: Pseudocrenilabrus
- Species: P. multicolor

Binomial name
- Pseudocrenilabrus multicolor (Schöller, 1903)

Subspecies
- Pseudocrenilabrus multicolor multicolor (Schöller, 1903); Pseudocrenilabrus multicolor victoria Seegers, 1990

Synonyms
- Chromis multicolor Schöller, 1903; Haplochromis multicolor (Schöller, 1903); Hemihaplochromis multicolor (Schöller, 1903); Paratilapia multicolor (Schöller, 1903)

= Egyptian mouthbrooder =

Species of fish

The Egyptian mouthbrooder (Pseudocrenilabrus multicolor) is a species of cichlid. This small mouthbrooder reaches about 8 cm (3.1 in) in length, and is found in rivers, lakes, and other freshwater habitats in Eastern Africa from Egypt and as far south as Tanzania. The common name Egyptian mouthbrooder was often limited to its northern nominate subspecies, in which case the southern P. m. victoriae is called the dwarf Victoria mouthbrooder. These subspecies are not universally regarded as valid.

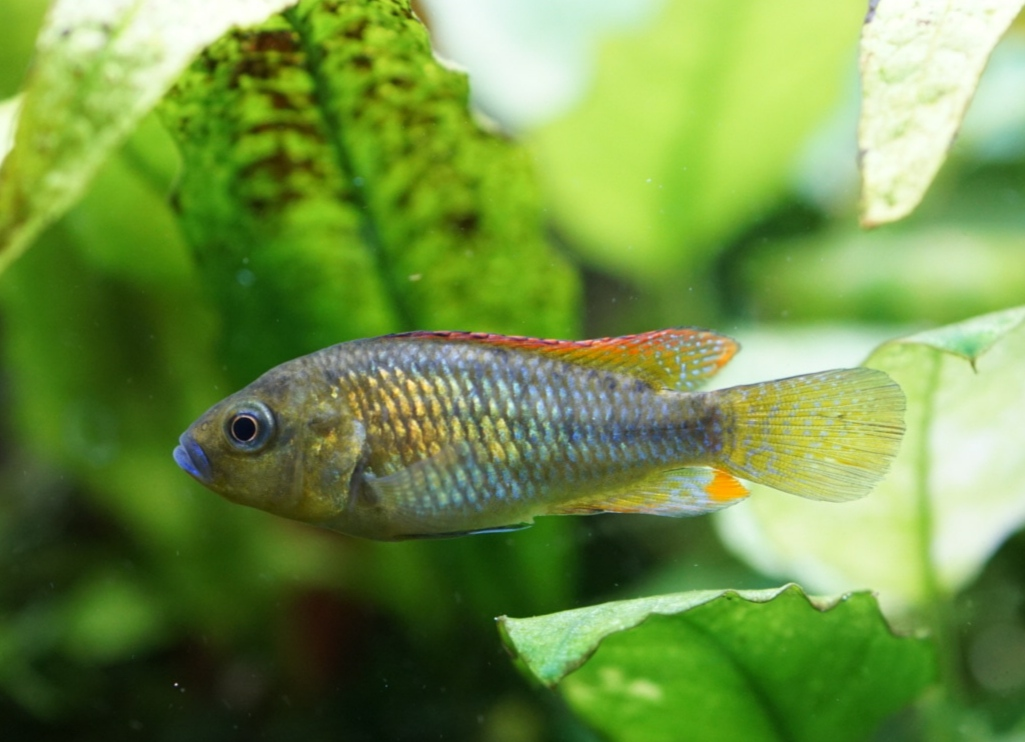
Pseudocrenilabrus multicolor "Lake Victoria"
