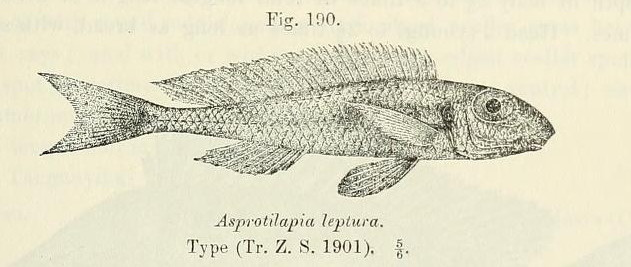

Conservation status
- Least Concern (IUCN 3.1)

Scientific classification
- Kingdom: Animalia
- Phylum: Chordata
- Class: Actinopterygii
- Order: Cichliformes
- Family: Cichlidae
- Subfamily: Pseudocrenilabrinae
- Tribe: Ectodini
- Genus: Asprotilapia; Boulenger, 1901
- Species: A. leptura

Binomial name
- Asprotilapia leptura Boulenger, 1901

Synonyms
- Xenotilapia leptura (Boulenger, 1901)

= Asprotilapia leptura =

Species of fish

Asprotilapia is a monospecific genus. Its only member, Asprotilapia leptura, is a species of cichlid endemic to Lake Tanganyika where it prefers areas with rocky substrates. This species can reach a length of 11 centimetres (4.3 in) TL. It can also be found in the aquarium trade.
