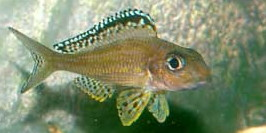

Scientific classification
- Kingdom: Animalia
- Phylum: Chordata
- Class: Actinopterygii
- Order: Cichliformes
- Family: Cichlidae
- Genus: Xenotilapia
- Species: X. papilio

Binomial name
- Xenotilapia papilio Büscher, 1990

= Xenotilapia papilio =

Species of fish

Xenotilapia papilio is a species of cichlid endemic to Lake Tanganyika in East Africa. It is found on the western shore of the lake, between Tembwe (Deux) and Kanoni in the Democratic Republic of the Congo. It prefers deeper, rocky habitats, especially where the rocks are covered with sand, at depths from 3–40 m (9.8–131.2 ft).

== Description ==
This cichlid is a small species that grows no longer than 10 cm (3.9 in) in total length. It does not show obvious sexual dimorphism, although ripe females, those with fully mature eggs ready to be fertilized, show a more rounded belly.

== Biology ==
Its diet comprises invertebrates which it extracts from the sediment by filtering it through its gills. Copepods, ostracods, and insect larvae, with filamentous algae and sand, have been found among their stomach contents. They are territorial and both parents are mouthbrooder. The subadults are found in small groups with the larger individuals forming pairs, which defend a territory on the upper face of a large rock.

== Taxonomy ==
The type specimen was found in 1989 by Heinz H. Büscher on a dive off the western shore of Lake Tanganyika, 40 km (25 miles) south of Moba. The specific name means "butterfly" because Büscher's Congolese companions gave the specimen that name. The type was placed in the Zoologische Staatssammlung München by Büscher.

This species has a restricted geographical range but still has two colour variants: at the type locality of Tembwe Deux, they have a dorsal fin that is brightly marked with black and white spots while to the north, the adult fishes have yellow dorsal fins which lack black markings.
