= Microdontochromis =

Scientific classification
- Kingdom: Animalia
- Phylum: Chordata
- Class: Actinopterygii
- Order: Cichliformes
- Family: Cichlidae
- Subfamily: Pseudocrenilabrinae
- Tribe: Ectodini
- Genus: Microdontochromis; Poll, 1986

Type species
- Xenotilapia tenuidentata Poll, 1951

Genus of fishes

Microdontochromis is a small genus of cichlid fish endemic to the Lake Tanganyika basin in East Africa.

== Species ==
There are currently two recognized species in this genus:

- Microdontochromis rotundiventralis Takahashi, Yanagisawa & Nakaya, 1997
- Microdontochromis tenuidentatus (Poll, 1951)
