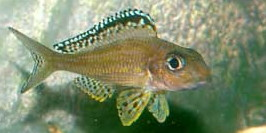
- X. papilio

Scientific classification
- Kingdom: Animalia
- Phylum: Chordata
- Class: Actinopterygii
- Order: Cichliformes
- Family: Cichlidae
- Tribe: Ectodini
- Genus: Xenotilapia; Boulenger, 1899

Type species
- Xenotilapia sima Boulenger, 1899

Synonyms
- Enantiopus Boulenger, 1906; Parectodus Poll, 1942; Stappersetta Whitley, 1950; Stappersia Boulenger, 1914

= Xenotilapia =

Genus of fishes

Xenotilapia is a genus of cichlids species endemic to Lake Tanganyika in east Africa.

The International Union for Conservation of Nature (IUCN) has assessed 16 Xenotilapia species; one of them is considered "Endangered" (Xenotilapia burtoni), the rest are of "Least Concern" or "Data Deficient".

== Species ==
There are currently 14 recognized species in this genus:

- Xenotilapia bathyphilus Poll, 1956
- Xenotilapia boulengeri (Poll, 1942)
- Xenotilapia burtoni Poll, 1951
- Xenotilapia caudafasciata Poll, 1951
- Xenotilapia flavipinnis Poll, 1985 (Yellow sand cichlid)
- Xenotilapia longispinis Poll, 1951
- Xenotilapia nasus De Vos, Risch & Thys van den Audenaerde, 1995
- Xenotilapia nigrolabiata Poll, 1951
- Xenotilapia ochrogenys (Boulenger, 1914)
- Xenotilapia ornatipinnis Boulenger, 1901
- Xenotilapia papilio Büscher, 1990
- Xenotilapia sima Boulenger, 1899
- Xenotilapia singularis (Boulenger, 1914)
- Xenotilapia spiloptera Poll & D. J. Stewart, 1975
