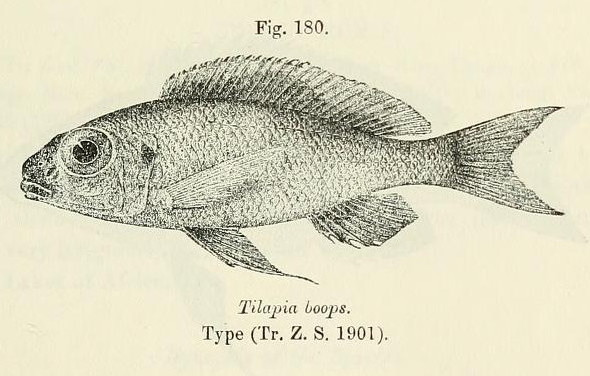

Conservation status
- Least Concern (IUCN 3.1)

Scientific classification
- Kingdom: Animalia
- Phylum: Chordata
- Class: Actinopterygii
- Order: Cichliformes
- Family: Cichlidae
- Genus: Ophthalmotilapia
- Species: O. boops

Binomial name
- Ophthalmotilapia boops (Boulenger, 1901)

Synonyms
- Tilapia boops Boulenger, 1901

= Ophthalmotilapia boops =

Species of fish

Ophthalmotilapia boops is a species of fish in the cichlid endemic to Lake Tanganyika where it is only known from along the southern shore of the lake. It can reach a length of 15 centimetres (5.9 in) TL. It can also be found in the aquarium trade.
