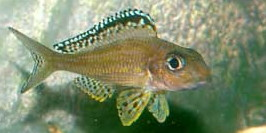
- Xenotilapia papilio

Scientific classification
- Kingdom: Animalia
- Phylum: Chordata
- Class: Actinopterygii
- Order: Cichliformes
- Family: Cichlidae
- Subfamily: Pseudocrenilabrinae
- Tribe: Ectodini; Poll, 1986

= Ectodini =

Tribe of fishes

Ectodini is a tribe of cichlids that are endemic to Lake Tanganyika in East Africa. They live in the benthic zone. Most of the genera in this tribe are monotypic. These fishes show diverse morphology and behaviour and the tribe includes taxa which live in sandy, muddy and rocky habitats.

== Genera ==
The following genera are classified in the tribe Ectodini:

- Asprotilapia Boulenger, 1901
- Aulonocranus Regan, 1920
- Callochromis Regan, 1920
- Cardiopharynx Poll, 1942
- Cunningtonia Boulenger, 1906
- Cyathopharynx Regan, 1920
- Ectodus Boulenger, 1898
- Grammatotria Boulenger, 1899
- Lestradea Poll, 1943
- Microdontochromis Poll, 1986
- Ophthalmotilapia Pellegrin, 1904
- Xenochromis Boulenger, 1899
- Xenotilapia Boulenger, 1899
