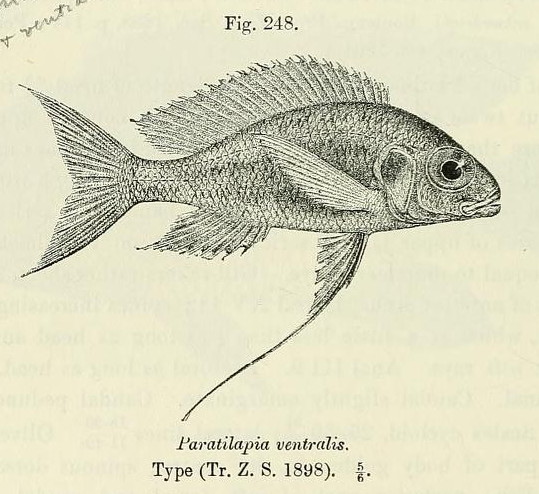

Conservation status
- Least Concern (IUCN 3.1)

Scientific classification
- Kingdom: Animalia
- Phylum: Chordata
- Class: Actinopterygii
- Order: Cichliformes
- Family: Cichlidae
- Genus: Ophthalmotilapia
- Species: O. ventralis

Binomial name
- Ophthalmotilapia ventralis (Boulenger, 1898)

Synonyms
- Paratilapia ventralis Boulenger, 1898; Ophthalmochromis ventralis (Boulenger, 1898); Ophthalmochromis ventralis ventralis (Boulenger, 1898); Ophthalmotilapia ventralis ventralis (Boulenger, 1898)

= Ophthalmotilapia ventralis =

Species of fish

Ophthalmotilapia ventralis is a species of cichlid endemic to Lake Tanganyika where it is only known from the southern end of the lake. It can reach a length of 15 centimetres (5.9 in) TL. It can also be found in the aquarium trade.
