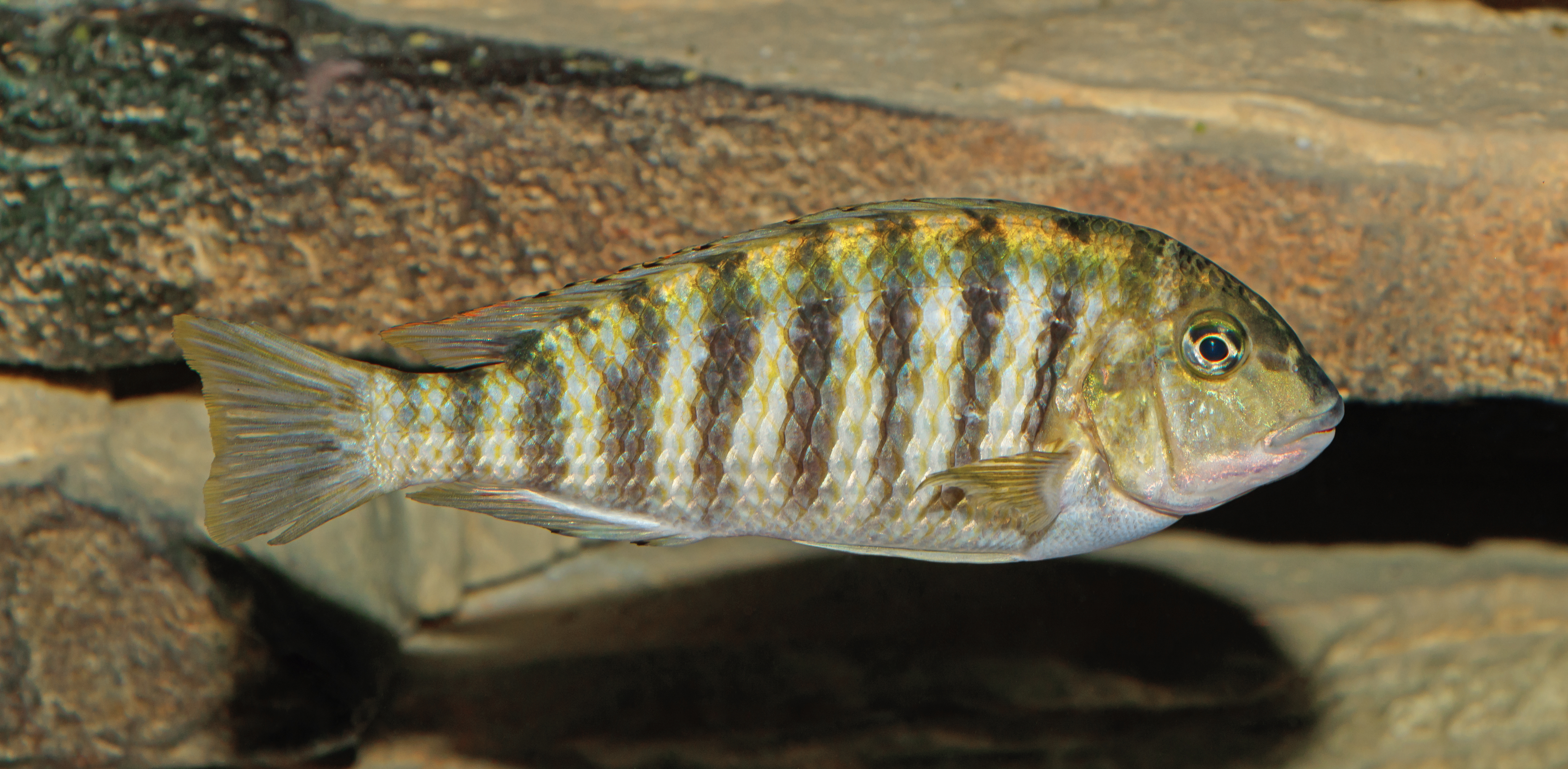
- Simochromis diagramma

Scientific classification
- Kingdom: Animalia
- Phylum: Chordata
- Class: Actinopterygii
- Division: Teleostei
- Order: Cichliformes
- Family: Cichlidae
- Tribe: Tropheini
- Genus: Simochromis; Boulenger, 1898

Type species
- Chromis diagramma Günther, 1894

= Simochromis =

Genus of fishes

Simochromis is a genus of cichlids endemic to Lake Tanganyika in Africa.

== Species ==
There is currently one recognized species are in this genus:

- Simochromis diagramma (Günther, 1894)

Four other species have been included, but are now generally in Pseudosimochromis:

- Pseudosimochromis babaulti (Pellegrin, 1927)
- Pseudosimochromis curvifrons (Poll, 1942)
- Pseudosimochromis margaretae G. S. Axelrod & J. A. Harrison, 1978
- Pseudosimochromis marginatus (Poll, 1956)
