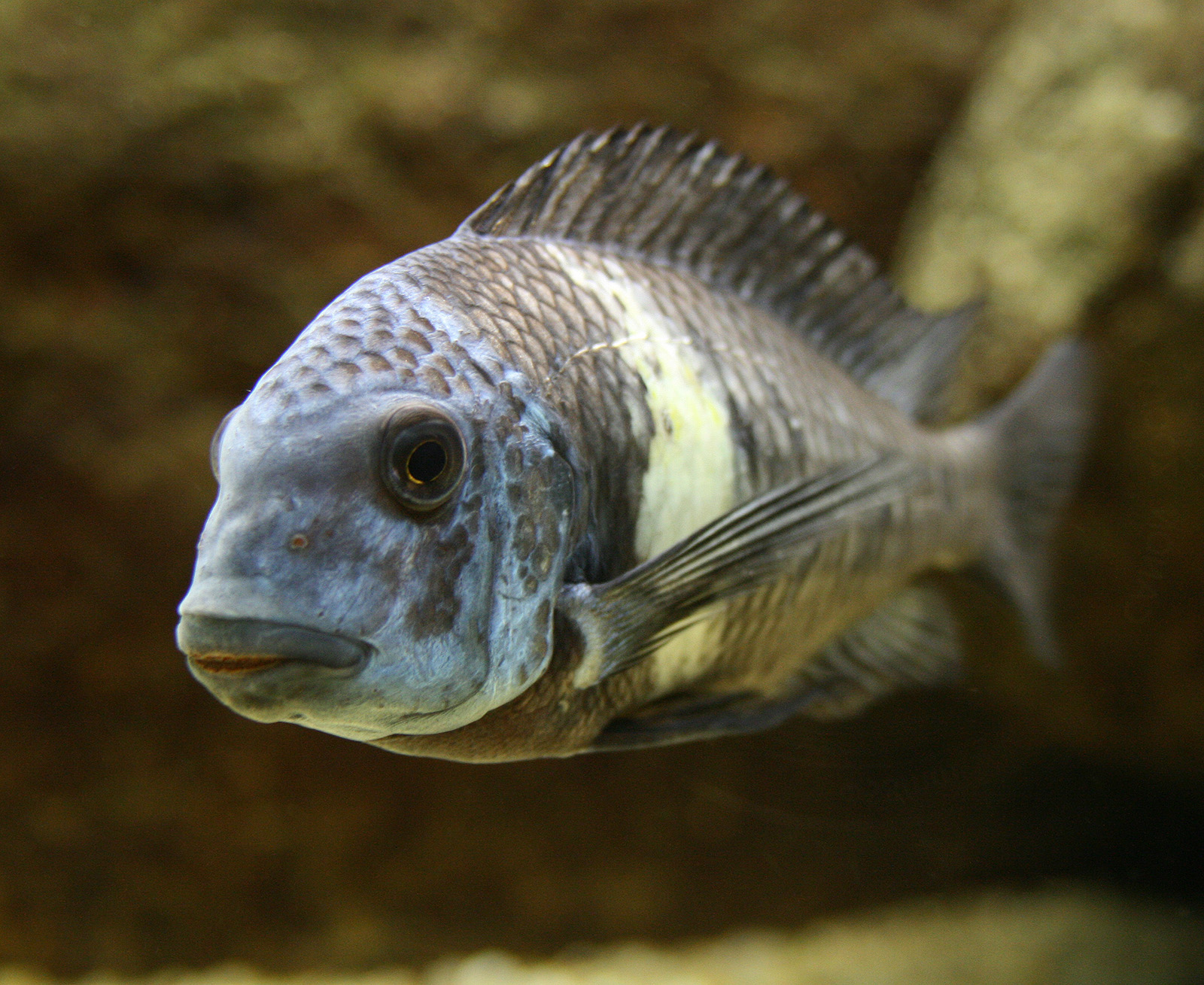
- Tropheus duboisi

Scientific classification
- Kingdom: Animalia
- Phylum: Chordata
- Class: Actinopterygii
- Order: Cichliformes
- Family: Cichlidae
- Subfamily: Pseudocrenilabrinae
- Tribe: Tropheini; Poll, 1986

= Tropheini =

Tribe of fishes

Tropheini is a tribe of African cichlids, endemic to Lake Tanganyika. The species in this tribe are mouthbrooders.

== Genera ==
- Interochromis (monotypic)
- Jabarichromis (monotypic)
- Limnotilapia (monotypic)
- Lobochilotes (monotypic)
- Petrochromis (8 species)
- Pseudosimochromis (4 species)
- Shuja (monotypic)
- Simochromis (monotypic)
- Tropheus (6 species)
