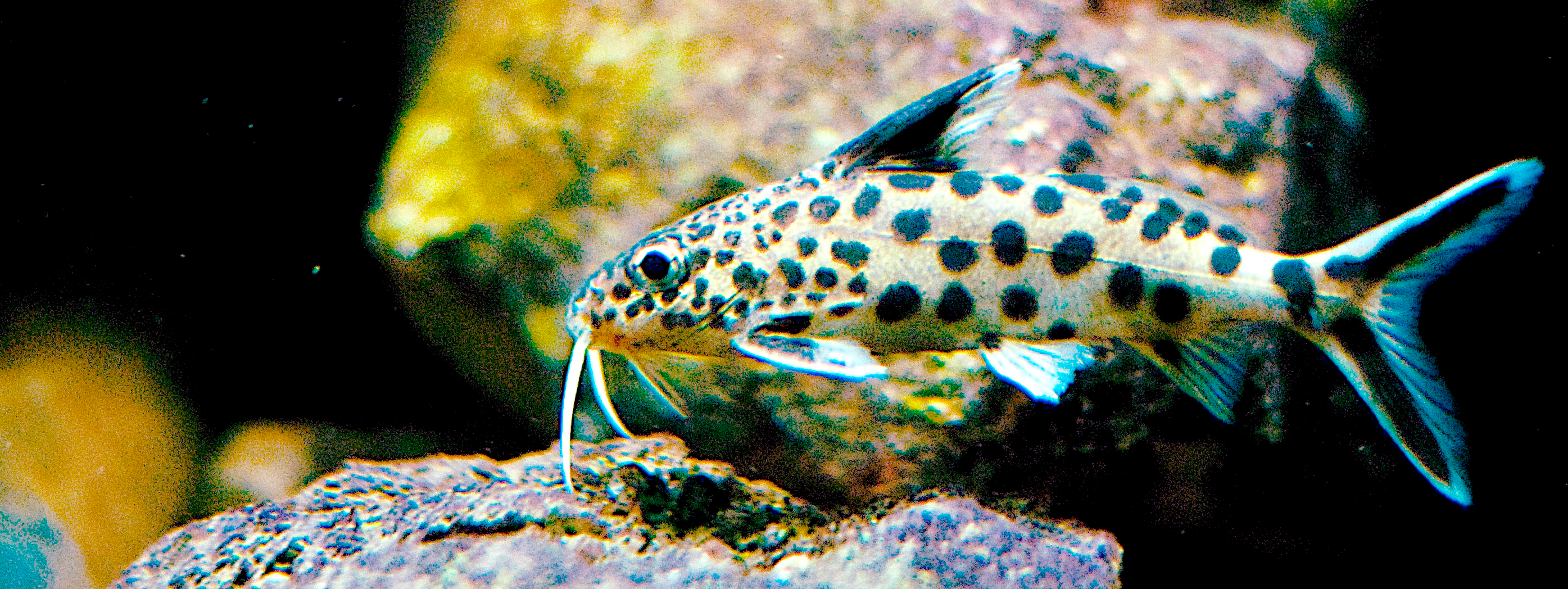

Conservation status
- Least Concern (IUCN 3.1)

Scientific classification
- Kingdom: Animalia
- Phylum: Chordata
- Class: Actinopterygii
- Division: Teleostei
- Order: Siluriformes
- Family: Mochokidae
- Genus: Synodontis
- Species: S. multipunctatus

Binomial name
- Synodontis multipunctatus Boulenger, 1898

= Synodontis multipunctatus =

Cuckoo catfish

Species of fish

Synodontis multipunctatus, also known as the cuckoo catfish, cuckoo squeaker, or multipunk, is a small catfish from Lake Tanganyika, one of the lakes in the Great Rift Valley system in Africa. It is a brood parasite upon mouthbrooding cichlids, the only known example among fishes. This species is a minor component of local commercial fisheries.

== Description ==
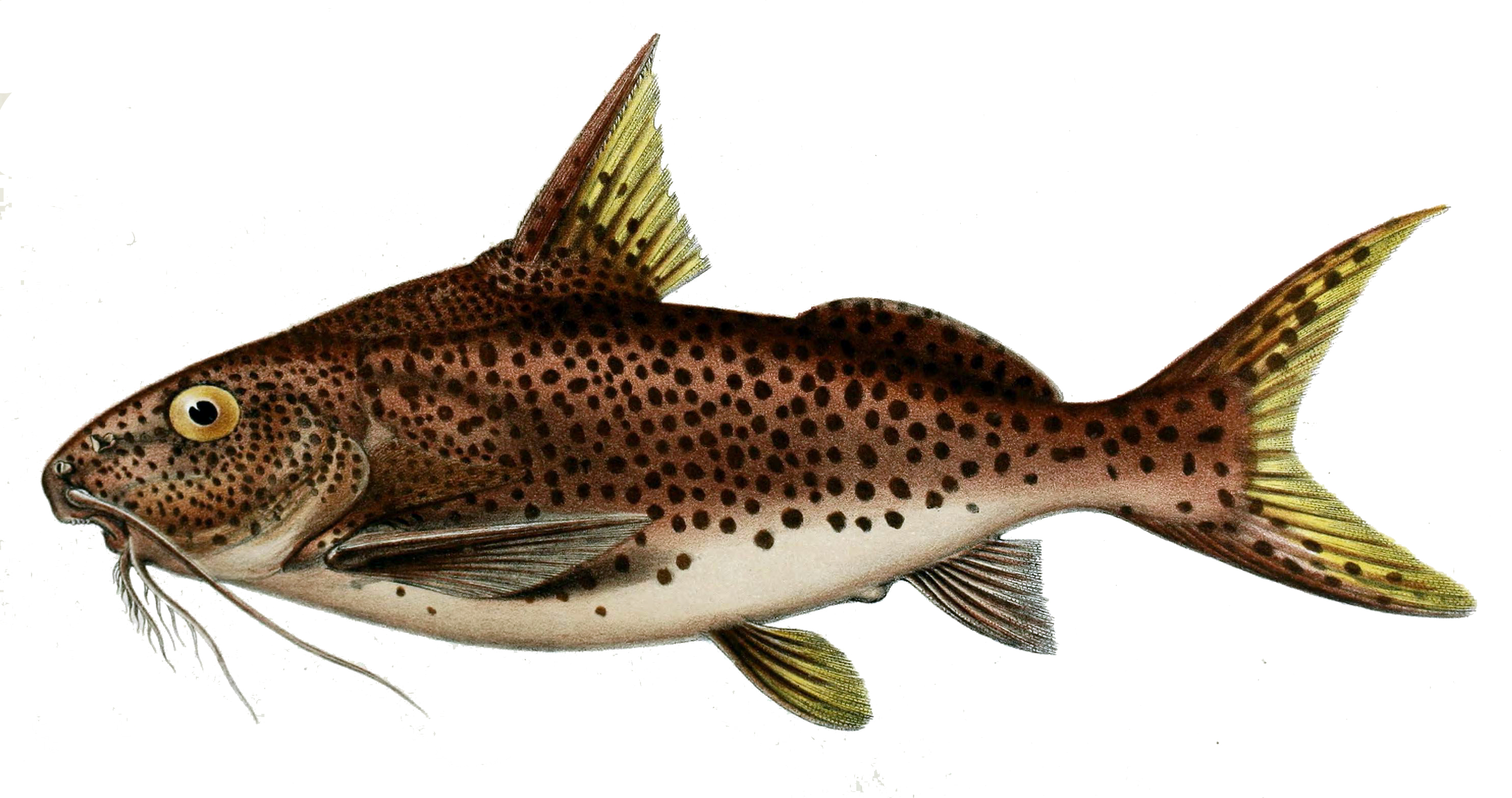
Synodontis multipunctatus

Synodontis multipunctatus is one of a number of species of upside-down catfish in Lake Tanganyika, which is more famous for its cichlids. It grows to a length of 27.5 centimetres (10.8 in) TL, and gathers in large schools at depths of about 40 metres (130 ft) in the lake. This species has a generalist diet, and it is closely related to another deepwater species, the piscivorous S. granulosus.

== Reproduction ==
S. multipunctatus is notable for its breeding behaviour - it is a brood parasite, similar to cuckoo birds from which it takes its common name. Lake Tanganyika is home to a number of mouthbrooding cichlids, which care for their eggs and young by carrying them in their mouth. S. multipunctatus uses these, particularly Ctenochromis horei and Simochromis babaulti, as unwitting caretakers for their children. A number of adaptations facilitate this behavior, such as large eggs which resemble their hosts' own, small clutches but frequent egg production, and rapid development compared to other Synodontis and cichlids.

The smell of spawning cichlids excites S. multipunctatus, and as the catfish approach the cichlids try to collect their own eggs, as Synodontis species often feed on fish eggs. The catfish release and fertilise their own eggs within the mass of cichlid eggs before the female cichlid finish collecting them; in doing so, the cichlid will collect both its own eggs and those of S. multipunctatus. These eggs will then hatch within the cichlid's mouth, and proceed to eat the cichlid eggs and embryos with their well-developed teeth and jaws. This reproduction method removes the burden of parental care from the S. multipunctatus.

== In the aquarium ==
Synodontis multipunctatus are a popular addition to cichlid aquariums. They grow to about 15 centimetres (5.9 in), and can be bred in captivity provided suitable hosts are present. Some aquarists have had success with host cichlids from Lake Malawi and Lake Victoria as well as those from Lake Tanganyika. They can be very aggressive and territorial towards other Synodontis species, they should be kept in groups over 3 to avoid competition between two, and proper cover and cave-like structures should be provided. They seem to be active in the day as much as the night and can prove quite lively. If kept in larger groups territorial issues are less likely.

== See also ==
- List of freshwater aquarium fish species
- Synodontis multipunctatus was featured in the "Interesting Fauna" section of Episode 292 of the 'Geologic Podcast' by George Hrab.
