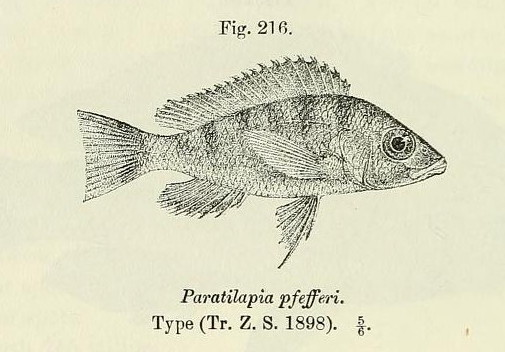

Conservation status
- Least Concern (IUCN 3.1)

Scientific classification
- Kingdom: Animalia
- Phylum: Chordata
- Class: Actinopterygii
- Order: Cichliformes
- Family: Cichlidae
- Genus: Jabarichromis; Haefeli, Schedel, Ronco, Indermaur & Salzburger, 2024
- Species: J. pfefferi

Binomial name
- Jabarichromis pfefferi (Boulenger, 1898)

Synonyms
- Gnathochromis pfefferi (Boulenger, 1898); Haplochromis pfefferi (Boulenger, 1898); Limnochromis pfefferi (Boulenger, 1898); Paratilapia pfefferi Boulenger, 1898

= Jabarichromis pfefferi =

Species of fish

Jabarichromis pfefferi is an African species of fish in the family Cichlidae. It is endemic to Lake Tanganyika and its slow-flowing tributaries in the countries of Burundi, the Democratic Republic of the Congo, Tanzania and Zambia. It is common and widespread. This cichlid is found in relatively shallow waters, typically over soft bottoms in places with aquatic grasses.

It reaches up to 14 cm (5.5 in) in length, and females are a little smaller than males. It eats invertebrates (especially shrimp) and plant material. Like many other Tanganyika cichlids, it is a mouthbrooder and sometimes kept in aquariums.

Although formerly included in the genus Gnathochromis, it is distantly related to the type species G. permaxillaris (tribe Limnochromini), instead being closer to Tropheini. The specific name honours the German zoologist Georg Johann Pfeffer (1854-1931).
