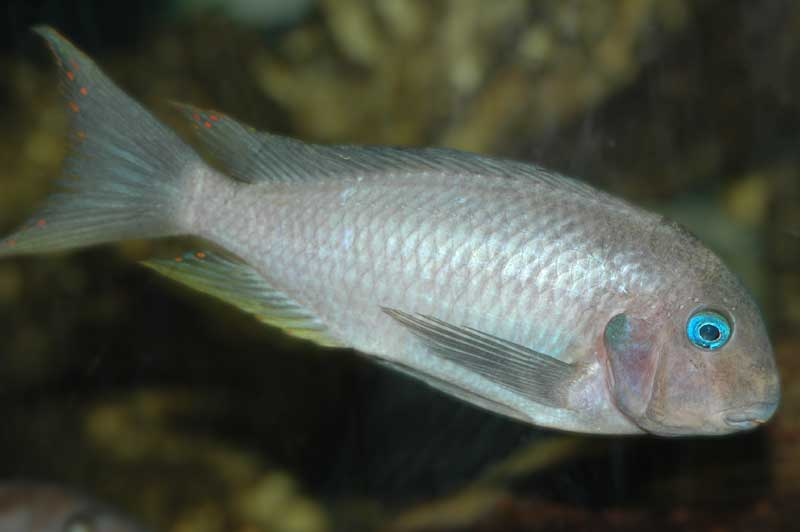

Scientific classification
- Domain: Eukaryota
- Kingdom: Animalia
- Phylum: Chordata
- Class: Actinopterygii
- Order: Cichliformes
- Family: Cichlidae
- Genus: Tropheus
- Species: T. polli

Binomial name
- Tropheus polli G. S. Axelrod, 1977

= Tropheus polli =

Species of fish

Tropheus polli is a species of cichlid endemic to Lake Tanganyika, where it is only known from the central eastern portion of the coast in areas with rocky substrates. This species can reach a total length of 16.5 cm (6.5 in). It can also be found in the aquarium trade. The specific name honours the ichthyologist Max Poll. It is considered by some authorities to be a synonym of Tropheus annectens.

== See also ==
- List of freshwater aquarium fish species
