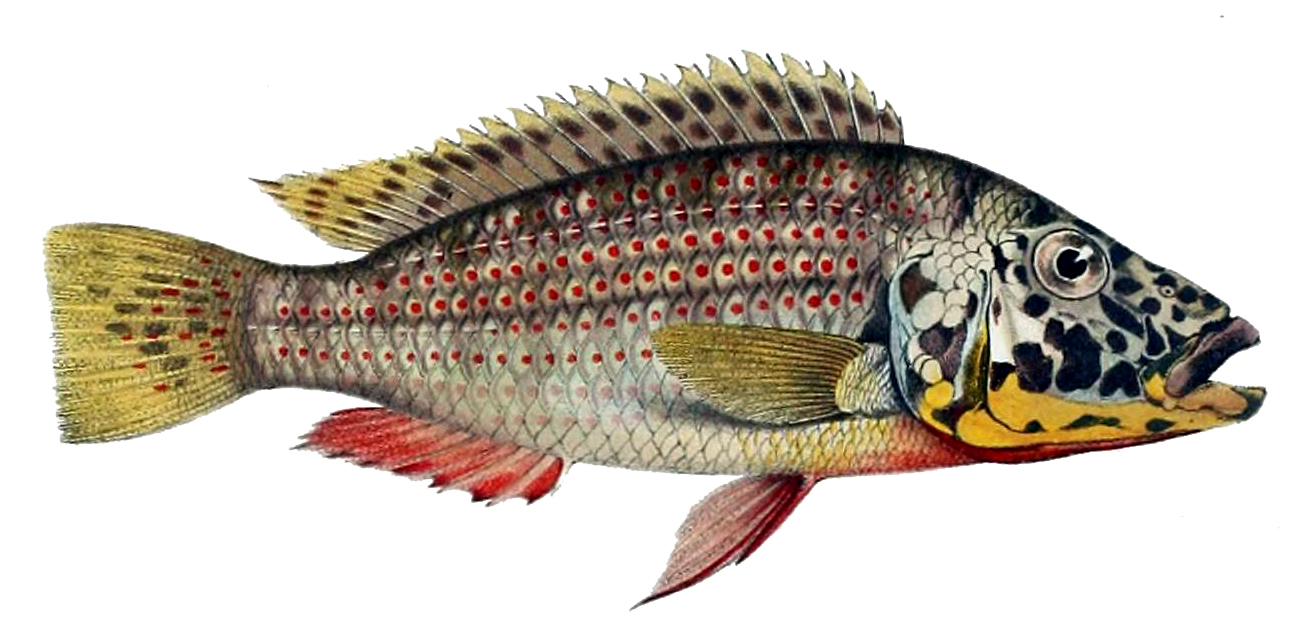
- Ctenochromis horei

Scientific classification
- Kingdom: Animalia
- Phylum: Chordata
- Class: Actinopterygii
- Order: Cichliformes
- Family: Cichlidae
- Tribe: Haplochromini
- Genus: Ctenochromis; Pfeffer, 1893

Type species
- Ctenochromis pectoralis Pfeffer, 1893

= Ctenochromis =

Genus of fishes

Ctenochromis is a genus of haplochromine cichlids endemic to the Lake Tanganyika and Congo River basins in Africa.

At present, 5 species are validly described in Ctenochromis:

- Ctenochromis horei (Günther, 1894)
- Ctenochromis luluae (Fowler, 1930)
- Ctenochromis oligacanthus (Regan, 1922)
- Ctenochromis pectoralis Pfeffer, 1893 – Pangani Haplo (listed as extinct by the IUCN, but this appears to be incorrect).
- Ctenochromis polli (Thys van den Audenaerde, 1964)

An undescribed population that appears to be a distinct species is:

- Ctenochromis aff. pectoralis
