= Maternal behavior =

- Maternal sensitivity
- Maternal behavior in vertebrates
