= Pseudosimochromis curvifrons =

Conservation status
- Least Concern (IUCN 3.1)

Scientific classification
- Kingdom: Animalia
- Phylum: Chordata
- Class: Actinopterygii
- Order: Cichliformes
- Family: Cichlidae
- Genus: Pseudosimochromis
- Species: P. curvifrons

Binomial name
- Pseudosimochromis curvifrons (Poll, 1942)

Synonyms
- Simochromis curvifrons Poll, 1942

Species of fish

Pseudosimochromis curvifrons is a species of mouthbrooding cichlid endemic to Lake Tanganyika. It is found in areas with rubble substrates at depths less than 10 m (33 ft). It can reach a length of 14 cm (5.5 in). This species can be found in the aquarium trade.

Although Pseudosimochromis has been treated as monotypic, recent authorities have also included several species formerly in Simochromis.
