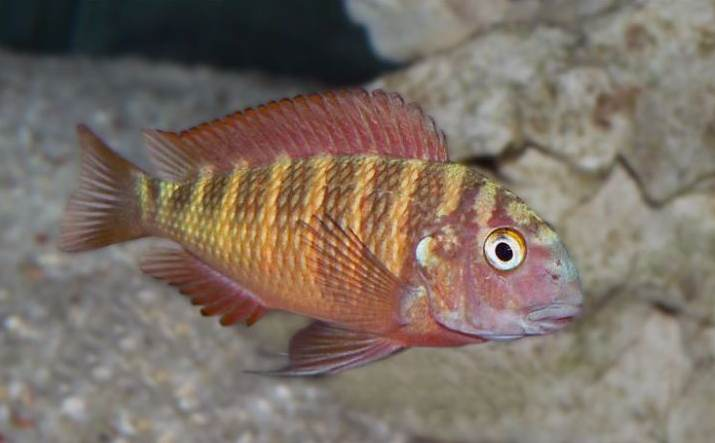
- Tropheus moorii

Scientific classification
- Kingdom: Animalia
- Phylum: Chordata
- Class: Actinopterygii
- Order: Cichliformes
- Family: Cichlidae
- Tribe: Tropheini
- Genus: Tropheus; Boulenger, 1898

Type species
- Tropheus moorii Boulenger, 1898

= Tropheus =

Genus of fishes

Tropheus is a small genus of at least six species of cichlids endemic to Lake Tanganyika in East Africa. The genus is widespread across all regions of Lake Tanganyika, from Burundi in the north to Zambia in the south. Males and females are relatively similar in color, with only subtle sexual dimorphism in the form of the male's larger size. All species are maternal mouthbrooders, with the females caring for their eggs and fry in their mouths; this characteristic provides their generic name, Tropheus, which comes from the Greek trophos, which means "to nurse" or, according to Boulenger, "one who rears, brings up, educates". The genus is fished lightly by the local population, but has never become a staple food fish due to its relatively small size and its habitat, which enables it to dart between rocks when threatened.

Most species occur along the coastal fringes of the lake at depths less than 3 m. These rocky shores, with numerous rocky outcroppings and boulder formations, form a habitat similar to many of the mbuna cichlids of Lake Malawi. This habitat provides shelter, and due to the shallow depth and the long hours of strong sunlight, heavy algal growth on which they feed. The only Tropheus species to dwell further out and deeper in the lake is Tropheus duboisi, which in general inhabits deeper regions of the lake down to around 15–20 m. All species are algal grazers and have underslung mouths adapted to rasping algae and microinvertebrates from submerged rocks.

The genus is relatively popular with aquarium hobbyists due to the beautiful markings and interesting behavior. Tropheus moorii in particular has become something of a cult fish within the hobby, in spite of the difficulties involved in keeping species of this genus in captivity.

== Species ==
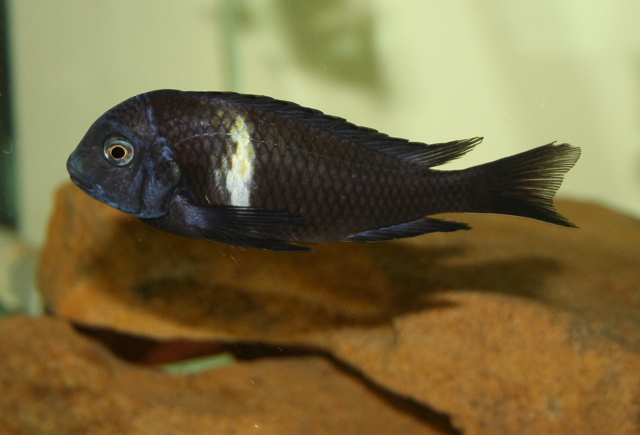
Tropheus duboisi from Kigoma

Six recognized species are in this genus:

- Tropheus annectens Boulenger, 1900
- Tropheus brichardi Nelissen & Thys van den Audenaerde, 1975
- Tropheus duboisi Marlier, 1959 (white spotted cichlid)
- Tropheus kasabae Nelissen, 1977
- Tropheus moorii Boulenger, 1898 (blunthead cichlid)
- Tropheus polli G. S. Axelrod, 1977
