= Maternal behavior in vertebrates =

Vertebrate maternal behavior is a form of parental care that is specifically given to young animals by their mother in order to ensure the survival of the young. Parental care is a form of altruism, which means that the behaviors involved often require a sacrifice that could put their own survival at risk. This encompasses behaviors that aid in the evolutionary success of the offspring and parental investment, which is a measure of expenditure (time, energy, etc.) exerted by the parent in an attempt to provide evolutionary benefits to the offspring. Therefore, it is a measure of the benefits versus costs of engaging in the parental behaviors. Behaviors commonly exhibited by the maternal parent include feeding, either by lactating or gathering food, grooming young, and keeping the young warm. Another important aspect of parental care is whether the care is provided to the offspring by each parent in a relatively equal manner, or whether it is provided predominantly or entirely by one parent. There are several species that exhibit biparental care, where behaviors and/or investment in the offspring is divided equally amongst the parents. This parenting strategy is common in birds. However, even in species who exhibit biparental care, the maternal role is essential since the females are responsible for the incubation and/or delivery of the young.

Although maternal care is essential in many classes of vertebrates, it is the most prevalent in mammals, since the care from the mother is essential for feeding and nourishing their young. Because the care exhibited by the mother plays such a large role in mammals, the role of the male is often very limited. Maternal care begins during fertilization and pregnancy however, the most prominent array of maternal behaviors are exhibited by the mother after the birth of their offspring and until the offspring are capable of being independent. The duration that the offspring stays with the mother and receives care, and the types of care behavior displayed by the mother varies amongst different species, forms of reproduction, and the level of development in the offspring at birth.

== Mammals ==
Mammals are a class of vertebrates that contain mammary glands which secrete milk that nourishes their offspring. This maternal behavior is unique from all other vertebrate classes. The basic maternal care patterns in mammals involve the internal incubation during gestation, the delivery of young, and maternal care until the young are weaned. The way a female mammal cares for their young depends on the level of maturation of the offspring at birth. There are three main categories of newborn maturation that different species of mammals exhibit. Altricial young (marsupials, rodents) are completely helpless and dependent on their mothers, precocial young (elephants, cattle) have highly developed sensory and motor functions at birth, and primates who are semi-helpless young, have an intermediate level of maturation. This variation in maturation at birth requires different maternal care from the mother.

=== Altricial species ===
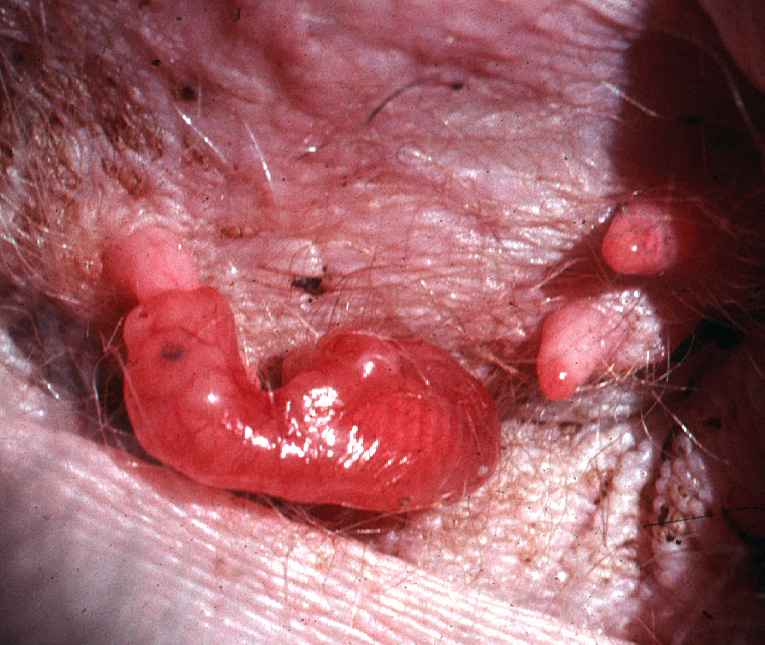
A baby kangaroo, known as a joey, inside their mother's pouch.

Altricial young are born deaf, blind, almost completely hairless and have very limited motor functioning. The maternal behavior in these species is primarily focussed on providing warmth for the young since they are unable to thermoregulate. This is achieved through the utilization of pouches in marsupial species, such as kangaroos, and the construction of nests in rodents and other altricial species. Because the young are not capable of locomotion, many other maternal behaviors take place at the nest as well, including feeding, nursing and grooming (licking). Members of this species are unable to recognize their own young and therefore will care for all the young in the nest equally, regardless of whether or not it is their own offspring. Once the young reach a point in their sensory, and motor development and no longer require the nutrients from their mothers milk, they will leave the nest and the mother will discontinue her maternal care behaviors.

=== Precocial species ===
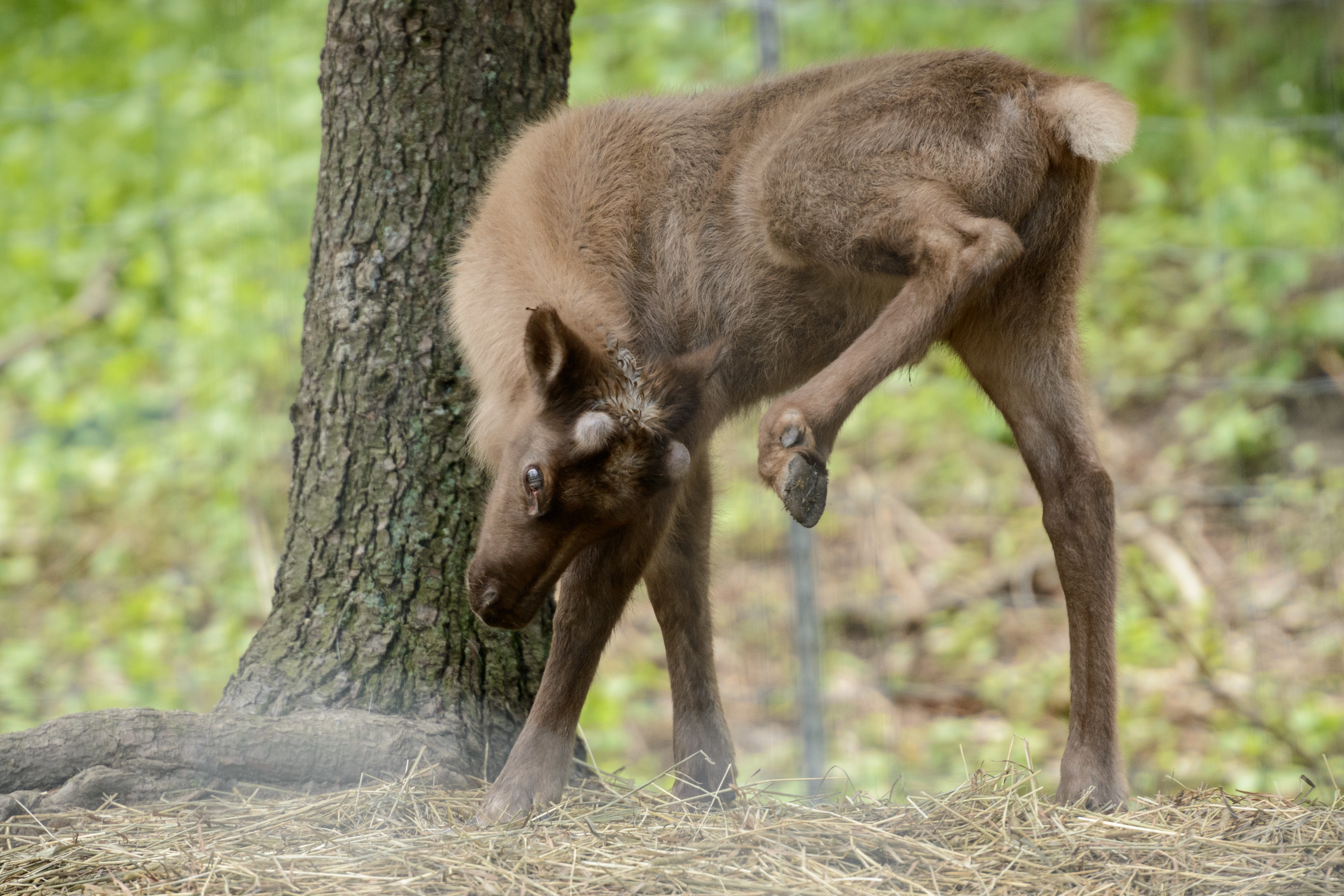
A baby reindeer (Rangifer tarandus). This species is precocial and young are able to get up and move around on their own within hours of being born.

Precocial young are born with a highly developed sensory and motor system. At birth they are able to see, hear, and most can walk or will learn to walk within the first few days after birth. The females in these species have adapted to be able to recognize their own young, which allows them to be selective about who they choose to care for. They will reject other young who try to nurse from them. The primary focus of these species is to develop an exclusive relationship with their young which allows for the resources and energy expenditure of the mother to be optimized by the offspring and not wasted on other young. This is essential for their success and fitness.

=== Primates ===
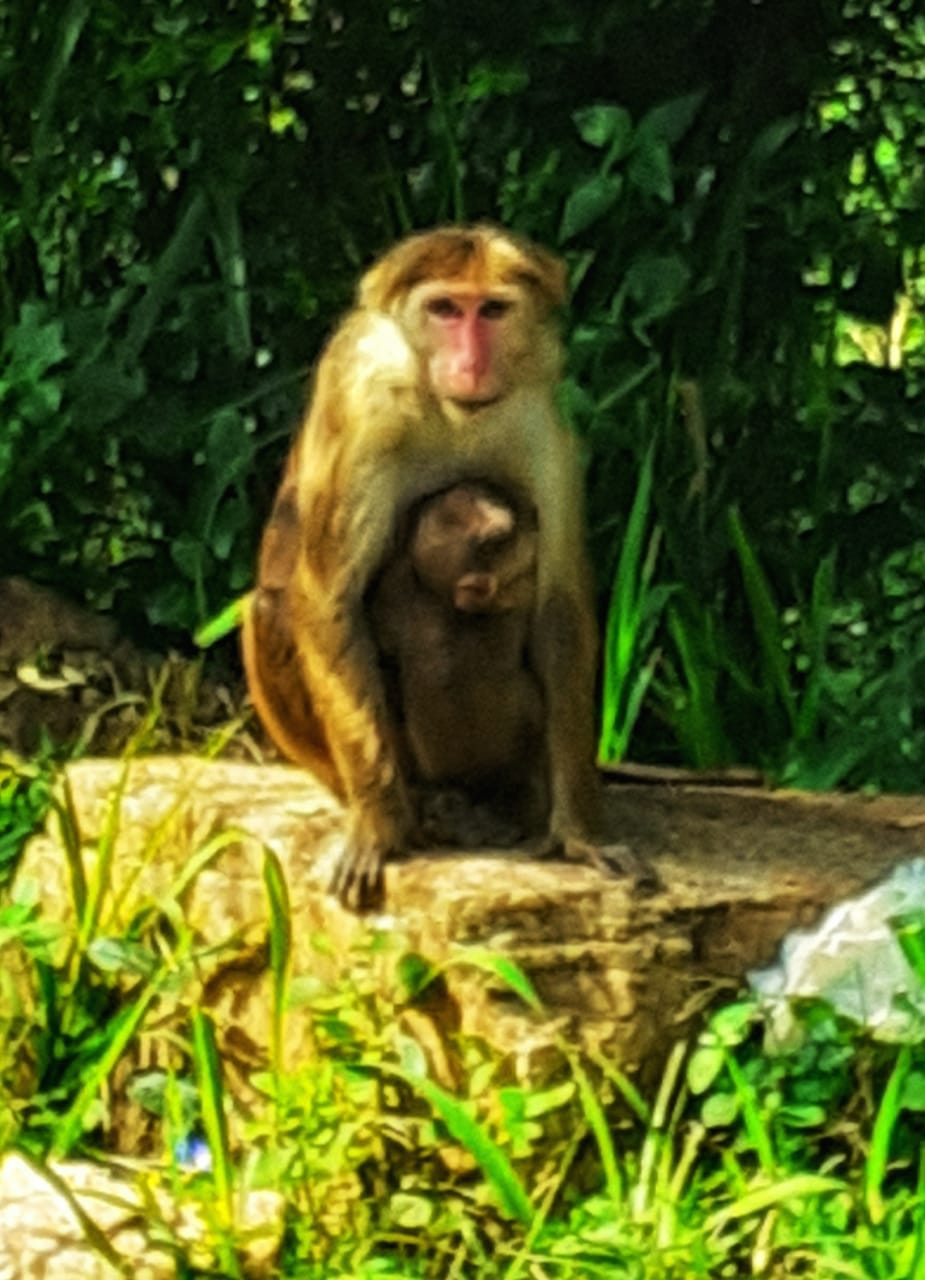
A baby monkey clinging to their mother.

Primates are born with intermediate maturation of altricial and precocial species. Newborns have limited motor functioning, but have highly developed sensory systems and the ability to thermoregulate. A unique characteristic in the maternal behavior in primates is that the mothers carry their young until their locomotive abilities develop. The mother will either carry the young in their arms, or the young will attach itself to the mother and cling to her. This is known as matricolia.

== Amphibians ==
Most amphibians are oviparous and lay their eggs in water, though some have adapted to lay them on land. There are also some species that are viviparous, giving birth to live young. Eggs can be fertilized either internally or externally depending on the species. Many amphibians exhibit maternal behaviors such as egg and young brooding and transport, as well as varying methods of feeding their young.

=== Frogs ===
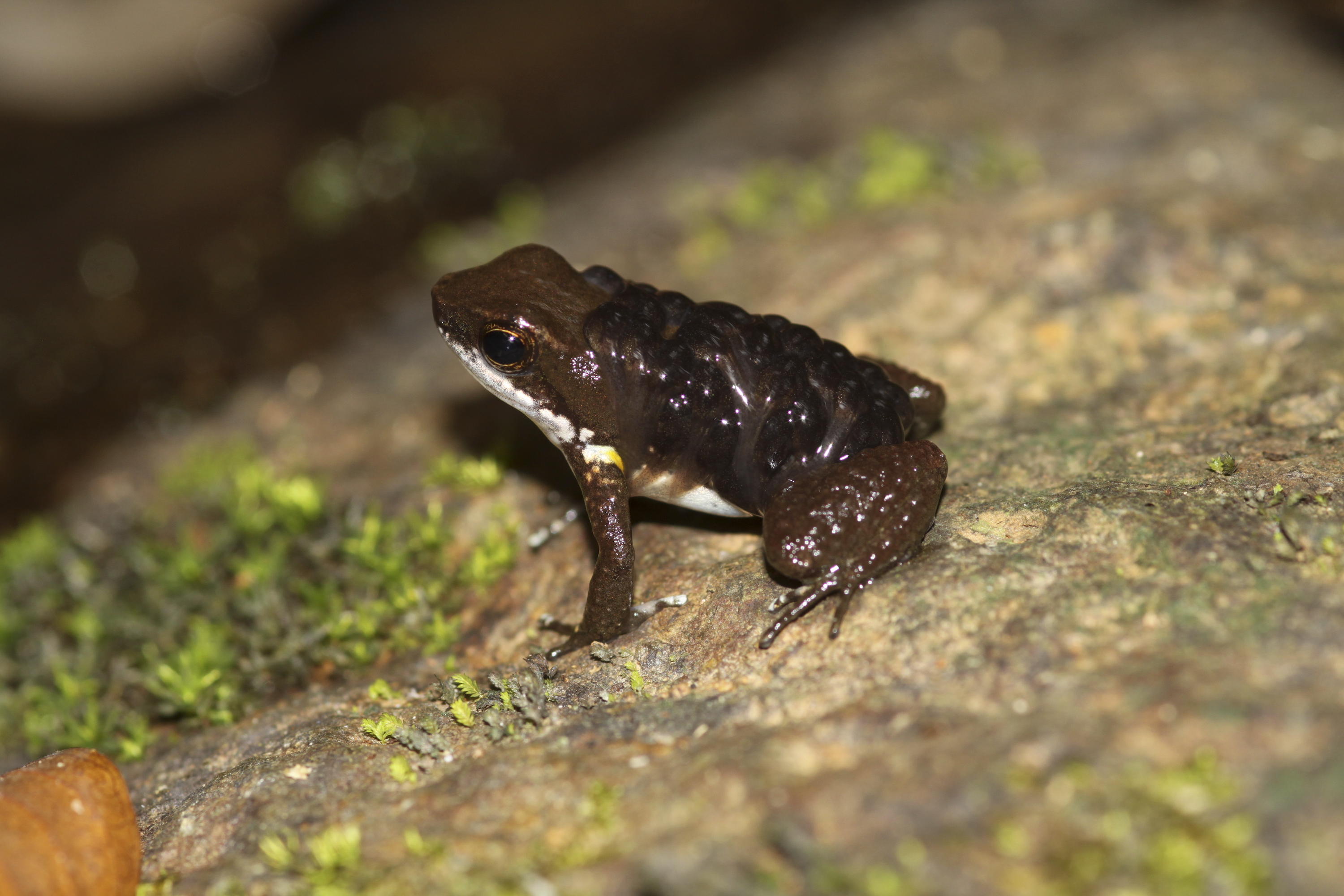
Colosthethus panamansis carrying her tadpoles on her back.

Frogs have developed many different maternal behaviors across varying species. The most common maternal behavior among frogs is egg attendance, wherein the mother will remain near her eggs as they develop to protect them from predators. A mother may also stay with her clutch in order to prevent desiccation, as she can rehydrate them by positioning themselves above the eggs, a behavior known as ventral brooding. Some species have also been observed oxygenating their eggs by moving them around occasionally. Frogs of the genus Hemiphractus carry their eggs around on their back until they hatch. Some species of this genus develop a dorsal pouch to carry their young inside while other leave them exposed. Some frogs, such as poison dart frogs, will lay unfertilized eggs for her clutch to eat.

=== Caecilians ===
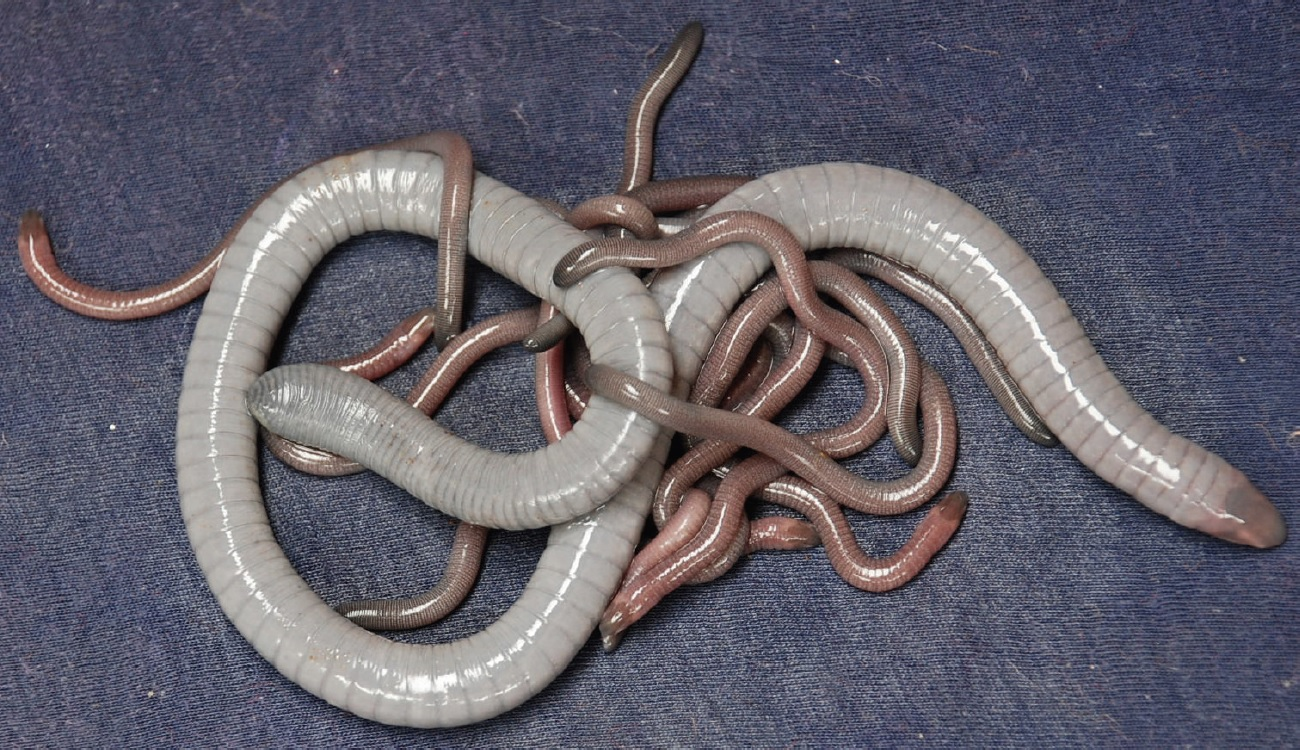
Herpele squalostoma feeding her young via maternal dermatophagy.

Caecilians can reproduce either by oviparity or viviparity, with some young having an aquatic larval stage while some develop to live on land immediately. Oviparous females build nests on land and keep their clutch there until they hatch, regardless of if they have an aquatic stage or not. Once young with an aquatic stage hatch they are able to survive on their own in the water without any more maternal care, however other young are altricial when they hatch, and rely on their mother to look after them until they develop enough to live fully on land. The mother feeds these altricial young by a process known as maternal dermatophagy, in which she will feed pieces of her skin to her young. Viviparous caecilians also give birth to altricial young. These young may be fed by maternal dermatophagy in the same way that oviparous species are fed, or they may be fed by a more specialized version in which the young eat their mother's hypertrophied oviduct or drink from her cloacal opening.

== Reptiles ==
Reptiles have a large diversity of maternal behaviors that is very dependent on the species and the type of reproduction it displays. Most reptiles are viviparous, although oviparous reptiles do exist. Oviparous reptiles often display very little or no maternal behavior after the eggs have hatched, while viviparous reptiles typically exhibit more extensive maternal care. Nile crocodiles however, are the exception to this. The females exhibit maternal care behaviors that involve transporting their young in their mouths shortly after they have hatched, to the waters edge and remain with the young until they have reached further development.

== Birds ==
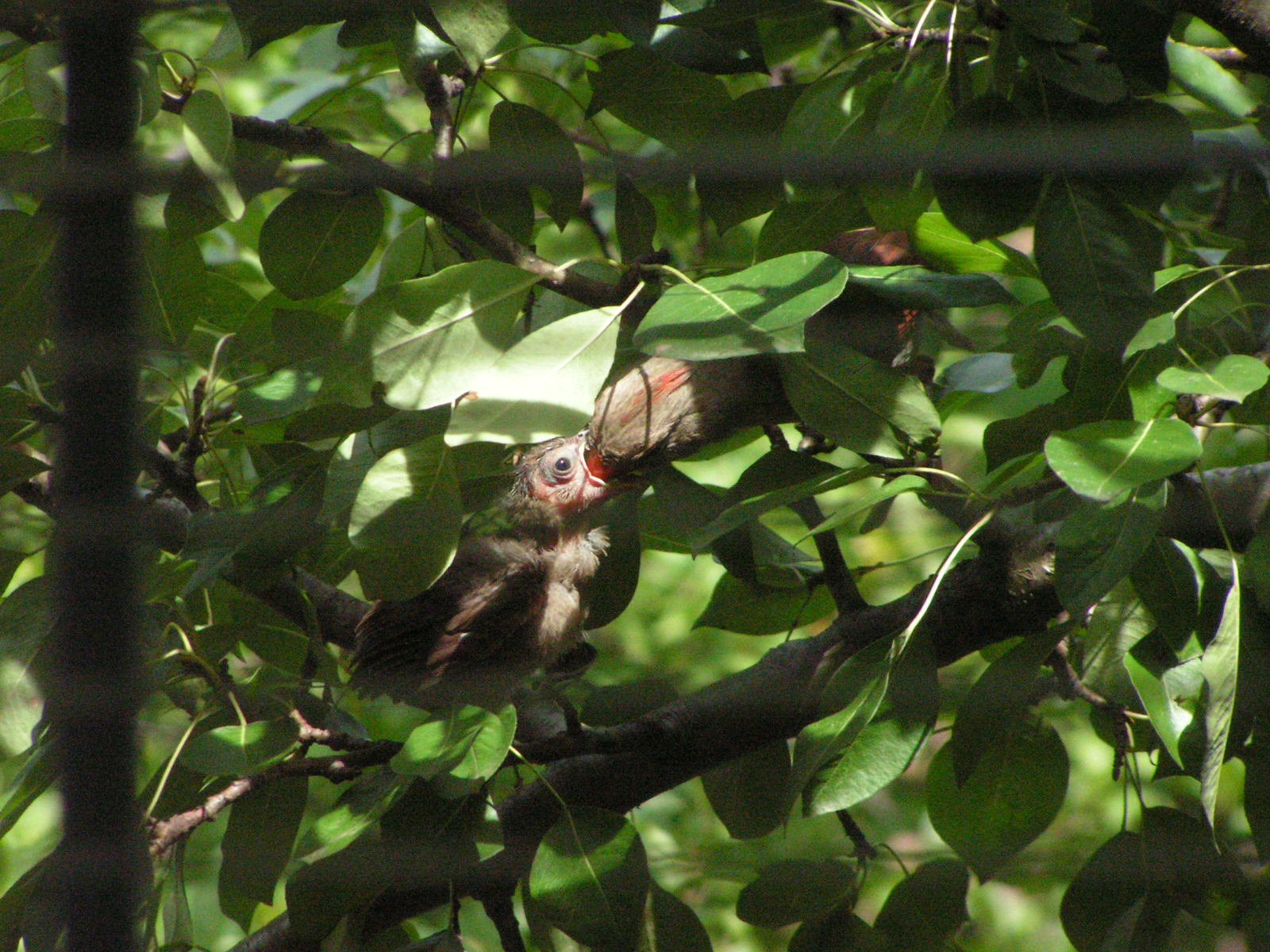
A female northern cardinal (Cardinalis cardinalis) feeding her baby.

Birds belong to a class of vertebrates that are oviparous and exhibit extensive parental behaviors. These behaviors are called brooding behaviors which include the incubation of the unhatched eggs and the care of the chicks after they have hatched. During incubation, the mother sits on her eggs which keeps them warm while the unhatched chicks are developing in the eggs. Once the eggs hatch, the mother will care for and feed her chicks until they reach maturation. Biparental care is common in birds, where the role of the male involves finding food and defending the nest, and the maternal behaviors involve caring for the chicks in the nest. In many cases, the male will regurgitate partially digested food into the mouth of the female and then the female will distribute the food equally amongst her chicks by regurgitating it for a second time into the mouths of the chicks.

== Fish ==
The majority of fish are oviparous, though there are many that are ovoviviparous and viviparous.

=== Oviparous fish ===
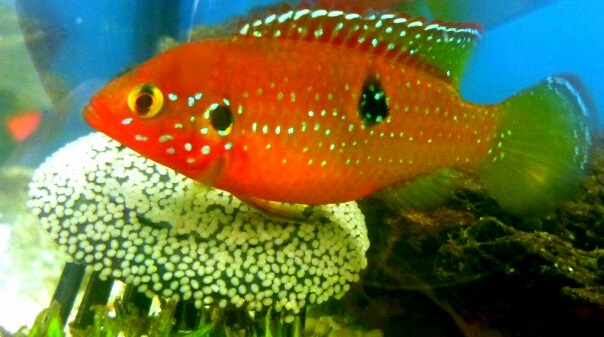
A female red jewel cichlid (Hemichromis bimaculatus) fanning and protecting her eggs.

Many oviparous fish display no maternal behaviors aside from laying the eggs, but some mothers will stay with their clutch to defend the eggs and fry from predators, a behavior very common among cichlids. Many cichlid species, such as Cichla ocellaris, will also remove underdeveloped eggs from the clutch, a behavior performed by both parents. Many female cichlids also fan their eggs with their fins, especially in slower moving water, in order to increase oxygenation and get rid of build up of undesired materials around the eggs.

==== Mouthbrooding ====
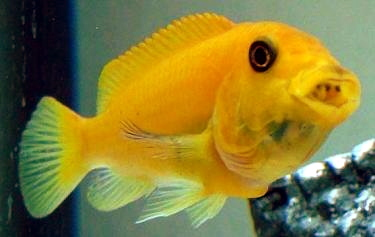
A Zebra mbuna (Maylandia zebra), a mouthbrooding cichlid, carrying her young in her mouth.

A lot of cichlid species, commonly known as mouthbrooders, carry their eggs and young in their mouth for an extended period of time while they hatch and grow. This behavior is most often displayed by the mother, though there are some species where both parents or just the father mouthbrood. In maternal mouthbrooders, after the eggs are laid the mother scoops them into her mouth and keeps them there, sometimes for multiple weeks. During the brooding period she will not eat and will put all her energy into caring for her young.

=== Ovoviviparous and viviparous fish ===
In both ovoviviparous and viviparous fish, the female incubates her young inside her body before giving birth to live young; the major difference is where the young get their nutrition during incubation. Ovoviviparous fish embryos mostly get their nutrients from the yolk of their eggs while viviparous fish embryos mostly get their nutrients directly from their mother. The gestation period is usually the only maternal care provided in these fish as they are developed when they are born.

== Brood parasitism ==
Brood parasitism is a reproductive strategy exhibited in some birds and one species of fish, wherein the parasite will lay their eggs in the nest or clutch of a host. The host will then provide care for the invasive young.

=== Brood parasitism in birds ===
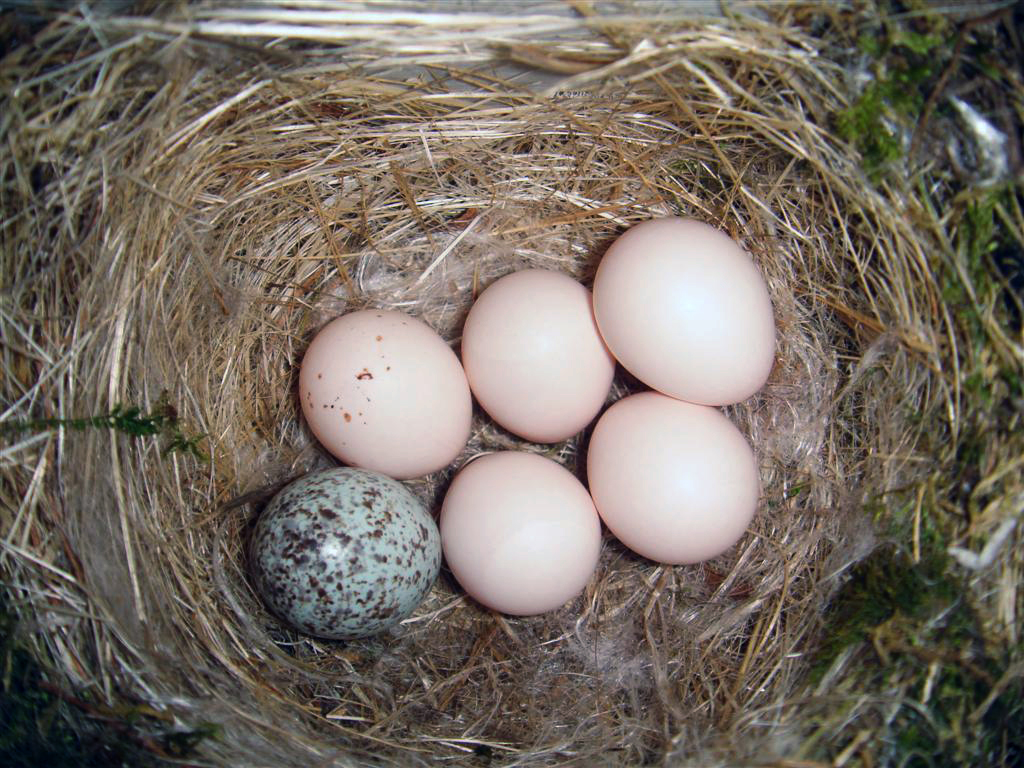
The nest of an Eastern Phoebe (Sayornis phoebe) containing its own eggs, along with one egg of a Brown-headed Cowbird (Molothrus ater), a well-known obligate brood parasite.

The parasitic birds have evolved ways to ensure the success of their offspring by having it be raised by a host, allowing them to no longer have to invest energy into maternal care themselves. As a result, their offspring receive maternal care from a host bird, which can cause their natural maternal behaviors to be affected. This results in them often neglecting to care for their own offspring. Although this behavior can be performed occasionally by many different birds, only about 1% of all bird species worldwide are considered to be obligate brood parasites.

=== Brood parasitism in fish ===
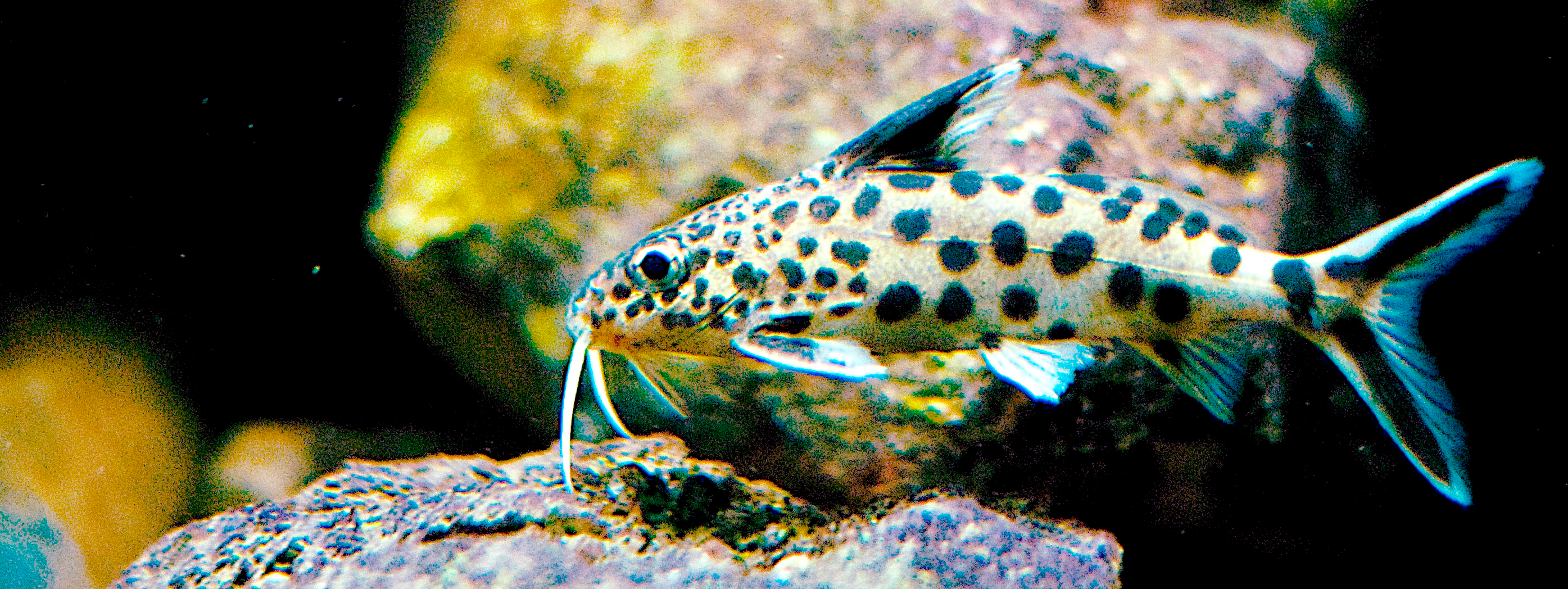
Synodontis multipunctatus, the cuckoo catfish.

The only vertebrate species to practice brood parasitism other than birds is the cuckoo catfish. These fish prey specifically on mouthbrooding cichlids. When the female cichlid lays her eggs on the ground the cuckoo catfish will lay her eggs among the clutch and a male will fertilize them before the cichlid picks her eggs up in her mouth, causing her to also pick up the cuckoo catfish's eggs. The cuckoo catfish eggs hatch before the cichlid eggs and the cuckoo catfish is able to eat the cichlid eggs and reside within the protection of the cichlid's mouth until they are spit out.

== Neurobiological influences on maternal behavior ==
In mammals, the medial pre-optic area of the brain is responsible for the initiation of maternal behaviors. In a non-maternal female, this action in this area of the brain is inhibited by the medial amygdala but during parturition, the inhibition stops which cause the female to exhibit behaviors related to the maternal care of their newly born offspring. During the parturition, the paraventricular nucleus starts to produce oxytocin (along with other hormones) which aids in the delivery of the young, as well as the behaviors exhibited by the mother after birth.

Prolactin and glucorticoides are chemicals that also play a role in the initiation of maternal behavior in both birds and mammals. Prolactin is involved in the interactions between a mother and their offspring, while glucorticoides are released when the mother is expending energy and resources causing her to work harder in order to properly care for her young.
