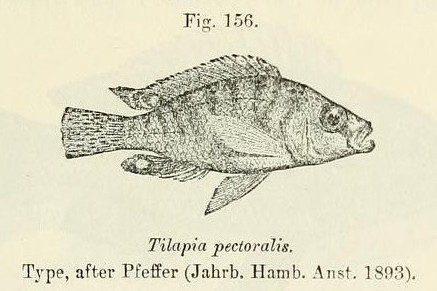

Conservation status
- Extinct (IUCN 2.3)

Scientific classification
- Kingdom: Animalia
- Phylum: Chordata
- Class: Actinopterygii
- Division: Teleostei
- Order: Cichliformes
- Family: Cichlidae
- Genus: Ctenochromis
- Species: †C. pectoralis

Binomial name
- †Ctenochromis pectoralis Pfeffer, 1893

Synonyms
- Haplochromis pectoralis (Pfeffer, 1893); Harpagochromis pectoralis (Pfeffer, 1893); Tilapia pectoralis (Pfeffer, 1893)

= Ctenochromis pectoralis =

Pangani haplo

Species of fish

Ctenochromis pectoralis, the Pangani haplo (short for "haplochromine"), is a species of fish in the family Cichlidae. It was originally characterized in the Pangani River of Tanzania, and may also be present in Kenya. It is listed as extinct by IUCN as a result of a 1996 evaluation, but this appears to be incorrect. A more recent IUCN publication stated that this species is not endangered in any way.

Two isolated populations of similar fish have been reported from springs flanking Mount Kilimanjaro, with some disagreement as to whether they represent the same or distinct related species: at the Kikuletwa Hot Springs of Hai District of Kilimanjaro Region, upstream of the Pangani, and the Mzima Springs, in the Tsavo River drainage, Kenya. The latter is listed as a distinct, vulnerable species, C. aff. pectoralis, by IUCN.
