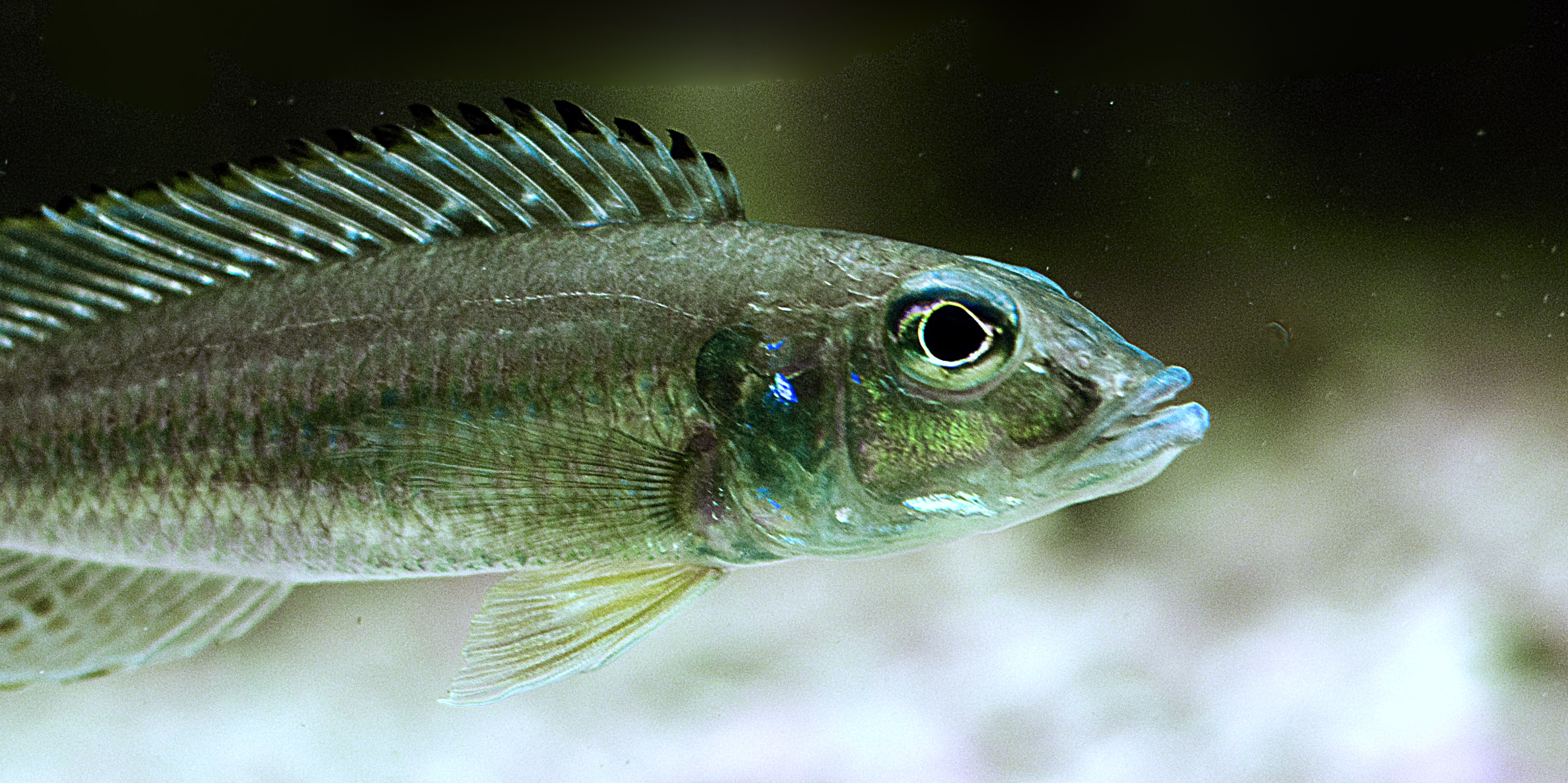

Conservation status
- Least Concern (IUCN 3.1)

Scientific classification
- Kingdom: Animalia
- Phylum: Chordata
- Class: Actinopterygii
- Order: Cichliformes
- Family: Cichlidae
- Subfamily: Pseudocrenilabrinae
- Tribe: Limnochromini
- Genus: Reganochromis; Whitley, 1929
- Species: R. calliurus

Binomial name
- Reganochromis calliurus (Boulenger, 1901)

Synonyms
- Paratilapia calliura Boulenger, 1901; Leptochromis calliura (Boulenger, 1901); Leptochromis calliurus (Boulenger, 1901); Reganochromis calliura (Boulenger, 1901)

= Reganochromis calliurus =

Species of fish

Reganochromis calliurus is a species of cichlid endemic to Lake Tanganyika in East Africa. It lives over a sandy substrate in deeper coastal waters, to depths of at least 60 m (200 ft). Its preferred diet consists mostly of shrimp. It can reach a total length of 15 cm (5.9 in). This fish can also be found in the aquarium trade. It is currently the only known member of its genus.

== Etymology ==
The generic name is a compound noun, made up of the surname Regan, in honour of the British ichthyologist Charles Tate Regan (1878–1943) of the British Museum (Natural History), and the Greek word chromis which was used by Aristotle for a type of fish. This was probably the drum Sciaenidae and may be derived from the word chroemo which means "to neigh" in reference to the noise made by drums. This word was applied to a number of percomorph fishes, such as damselfish, cardinalfish, dottybacks, wrasses and cichilds, by ichthyologists as these were thought to be closely related.
