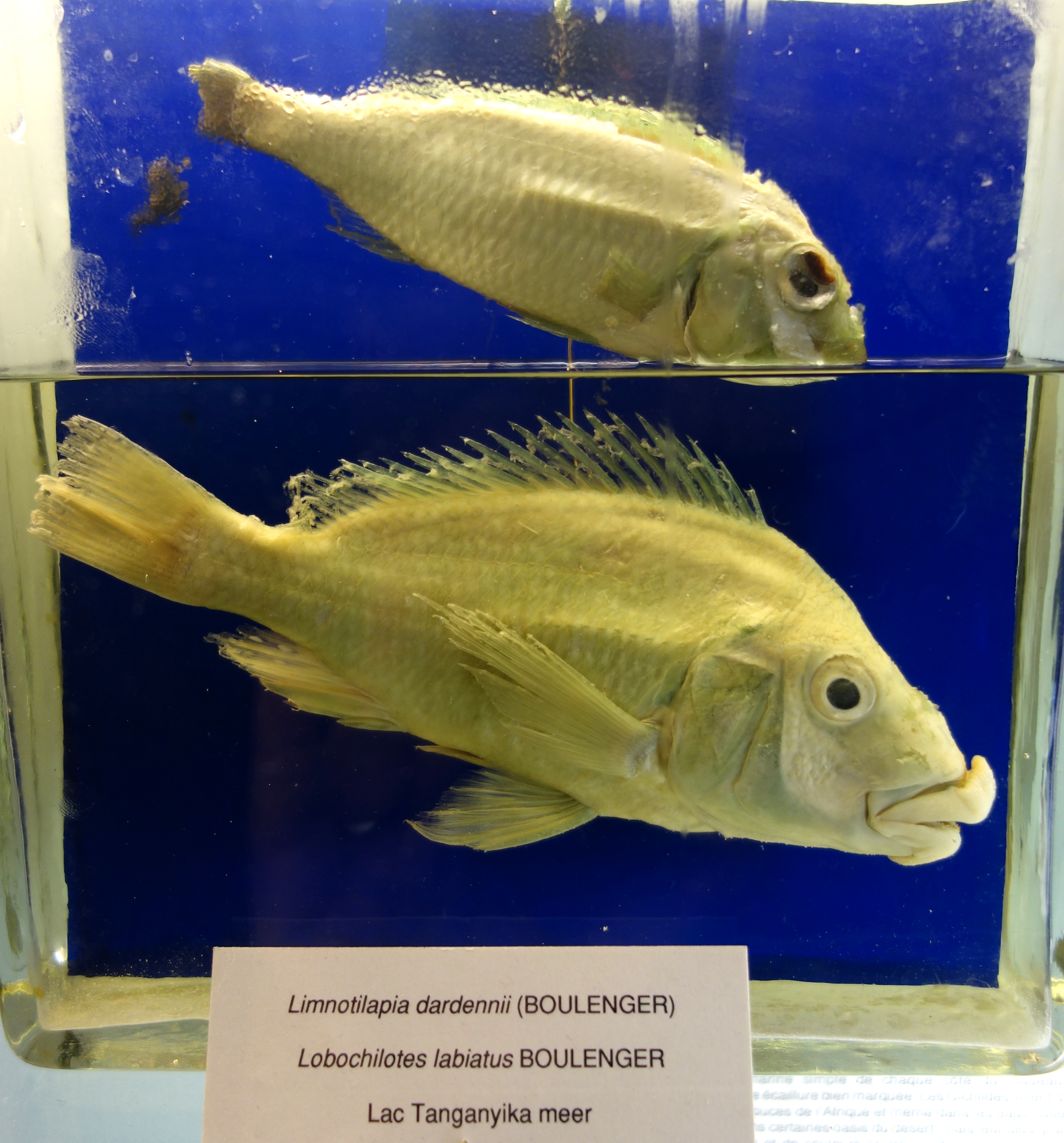
- Lobochilotes labiata (bottom)

Conservation status
- Least Concern (IUCN 3.1)

Scientific classification
- Kingdom: Animalia
- Phylum: Chordata
- Class: Actinopterygii
- Order: Cichliformes
- Family: Cichlidae
- Subfamily: Pseudocrenilabrinae
- Tribe: Tropheini
- Genus: Lobochilotes; Boulenger, 1915
- Species: L. labiata

Binomial name
- Lobochilotes labiata (Boulenger, 1898)

Synonyms
- Lobochilotes labiatus

= Lobochilotes labiata =

Genus of fishes

Lobochilotes labiata is a species of fish endemic to Lake Tanganyika. This species can reach a length of 36.8 cm (14.5 in), and can be found in the aquarium trade. It is currently the only known species in its genus.

== See also ==
- List of freshwater aquarium fish species
