= Pseudosimochromis =

Scientific classification
- Kingdom: Animalia
- Phylum: Chordata
- Class: Actinopterygii
- Order: Cichliformes
- Family: Cichlidae
- Tribe: Tropheini
- Genus: Pseudosimochromis; Nelissen, 1977

Type species
- Simochromis curvifrons Poll, 1942

Genus of fishes

Pseudosimochromis is a genus of fish in the cichlid family, endemic to the Lake Tanganyika basin in Africa. They are small mouthbrooding cichlids that can reach up to 14 cm (5.5 in) in length.

== Species ==
The species in Pseudosimochromis were formerly included in Simochromis. The limits between the individual species is in need of a review. As presently defined, following are recognized in the Pseudosimochromis:

- Pseudosimochromis babaulti (Pellegrin, 1927)
- Pseudosimochromis curvifrons (Poll, 1942)
- Pseudosimochromis margaretae (Axelrod & Harrison, 1978)
- Pseudosimochromis marginatus (Poll, 1956)
- Pseudosimochromis pleurospilus Nelissen, 1978 — likely a synonym of P. babaulti.
