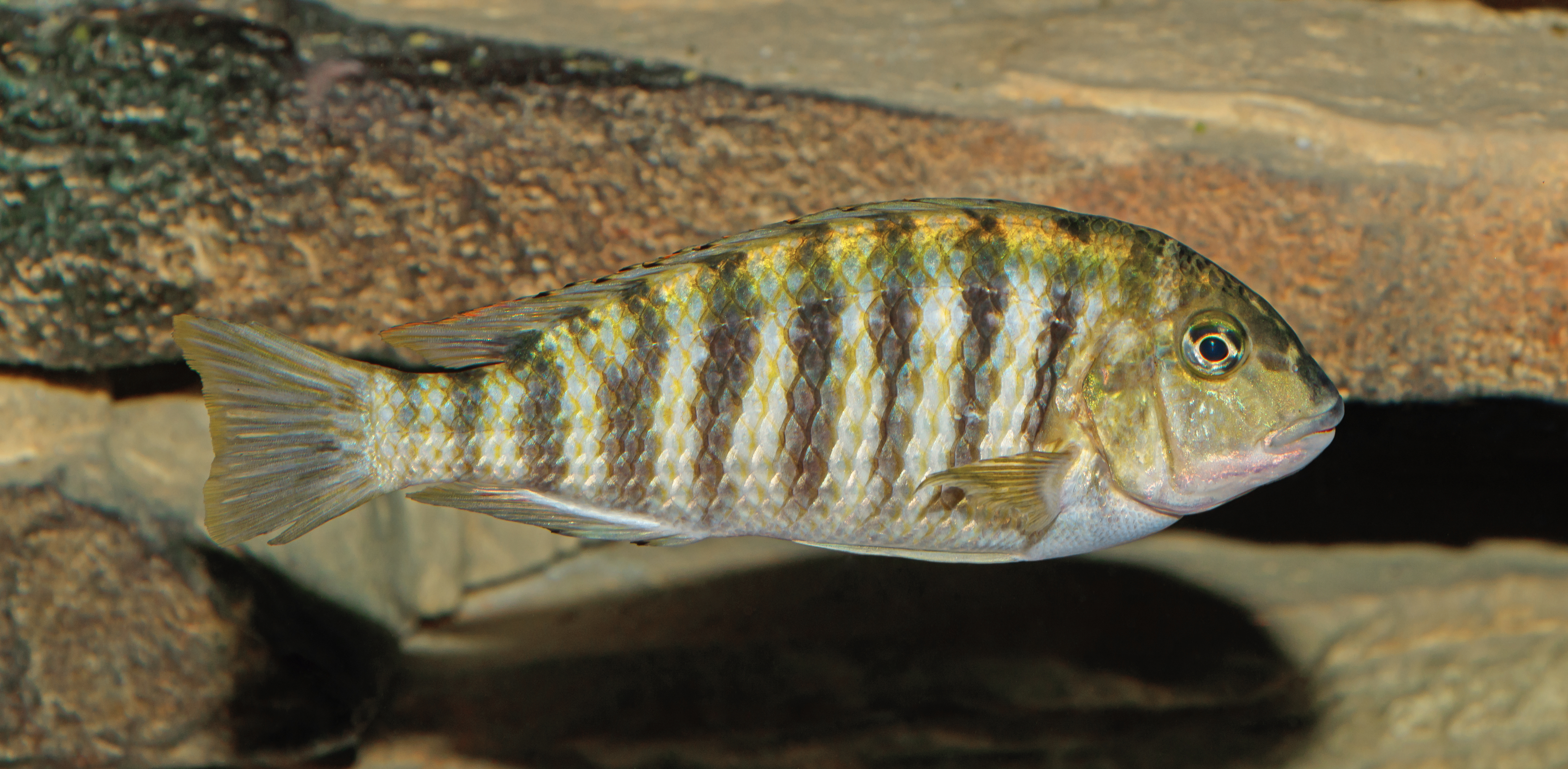

Conservation status
- Least Concern (IUCN 3.1)

Scientific classification
- Kingdom: Animalia
- Phylum: Chordata
- Class: Actinopterygii
- Order: Cichliformes
- Family: Cichlidae
- Genus: Simochromis
- Species: S. diagramma

Binomial name
- Simochromis diagramma (Günther, 1893)

Synonyms
- Chromis diagramma Günther, 1894; Tilapia adolfi Steindachner, 1909

= Simochromis diagramma =

Species of fish

Simochromis diagramma is a species of cichlid endemic to Lake Tanganyika where it prefers murky waters with rock-rubble substrates usually at less than 5 metres (16 ft) and never deeper than 10 metres (33 ft). It can reach a length of 19.5 centimetres (7.7 in) TL. It can also be found in the aquarium trade.
