= Baileychromis =

Conservation status
- Least Concern (IUCN 3.1)

Scientific classification
- Kingdom: Animalia
- Phylum: Chordata
- Class: Actinopterygii
- Order: Cichliformes
- Family: Cichlidae
- Subfamily: Pseudocrenilabrinae
- Tribe: Limnochromini
- Genus: Baileychromis; Poll, 1986
- Species: B. centropomoides

Binomial name
- Baileychromis centropomoides (R. M. Bailey & D. J. Stewart, 1977)

Synonyms
- Leptochromis centropomoides Bailey & Stewart, 1977; Reganochromis centropomoides (Bailey & Stewart, 1977)

Species of fish

Baileychromis centropomoides is a species of cichlid endemic to Lake Tanganyika in east Africa. This fish grows to a length of 16.8 centimetres (6.6 in) TL. It is currently the only known member of its genus. The generic name is a compound noun, made up of the surname Bailey, in honour of the American ichthyologist Reeve Maclaren Bailey (1911-2011) of the University of Michigan, and the Greek word chromis which was used by Aristotle for a type of fish. This was probably the drum Sciaenidae and may be derived from the word chroemo which means "to neigh" in reference to the noise made by drums. This word was applied to a number of percomorph fishes, such as damselfish, cardinalfish, dottybacks, wrasses and cichilds, by ichthyologists as these were thought to be closely related.
