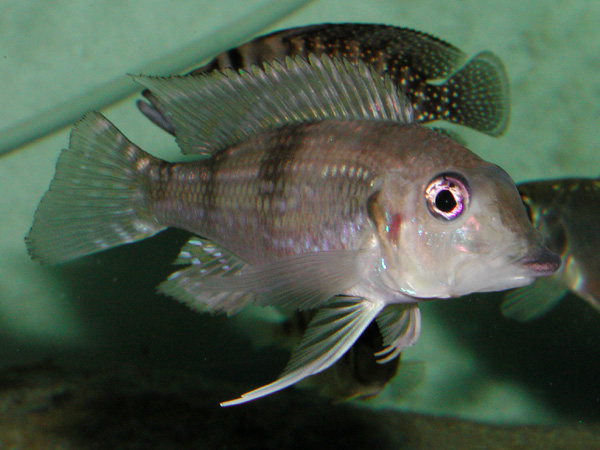
- Gnathochromis permaxillaris

Scientific classification
- Kingdom: Animalia
- Phylum: Chordata
- Class: Actinopterygii
- Order: Cichliformes
- Family: Cichlidae
- Subfamily: Pseudocrenilabrinae
- Tribe: Limnochromini; Poll, 1986

= Limnochromini =

Tribe of fishes

Limnochromini is a tribe of African cichlids from Lake Tanganyika. They are bi-parental and mouthbrooding fish.

== Genera ==
There are six genera within the tribe Limnochromini:

- Baileychromis Poll, 1986
- Gnathochromis Poll, 1981
- Limnochromis Regan, 1920
- Reganochromis Whitley, 1929
- Tangachromis Poll 1981
- Triglachromis Poll & Thys van den Audenaerde, 1974
