= Tropheus kasabae =

Conservation status
- Least Concern (IUCN 3.1)

Scientific classification
- Kingdom: Animalia
- Phylum: Chordata
- Class: Actinopterygii
- Order: Cichliformes
- Family: Cichlidae
- Genus: Tropheus
- Species: T. kasabae

Binomial name
- Tropheus kasabae Nelissen, 1977

Synonyms
- Tropheus moorii kasabae Nelissen, 1977

Species of fish

Tropheus kasabae is a species of cichlid endemic to Lake Tanganyika where it is found in areas with rocky substrates in the southern portion of the lake. This species can reach a total length of 11.1 cm (4.4 in). It can be found in the aquarium trade.
