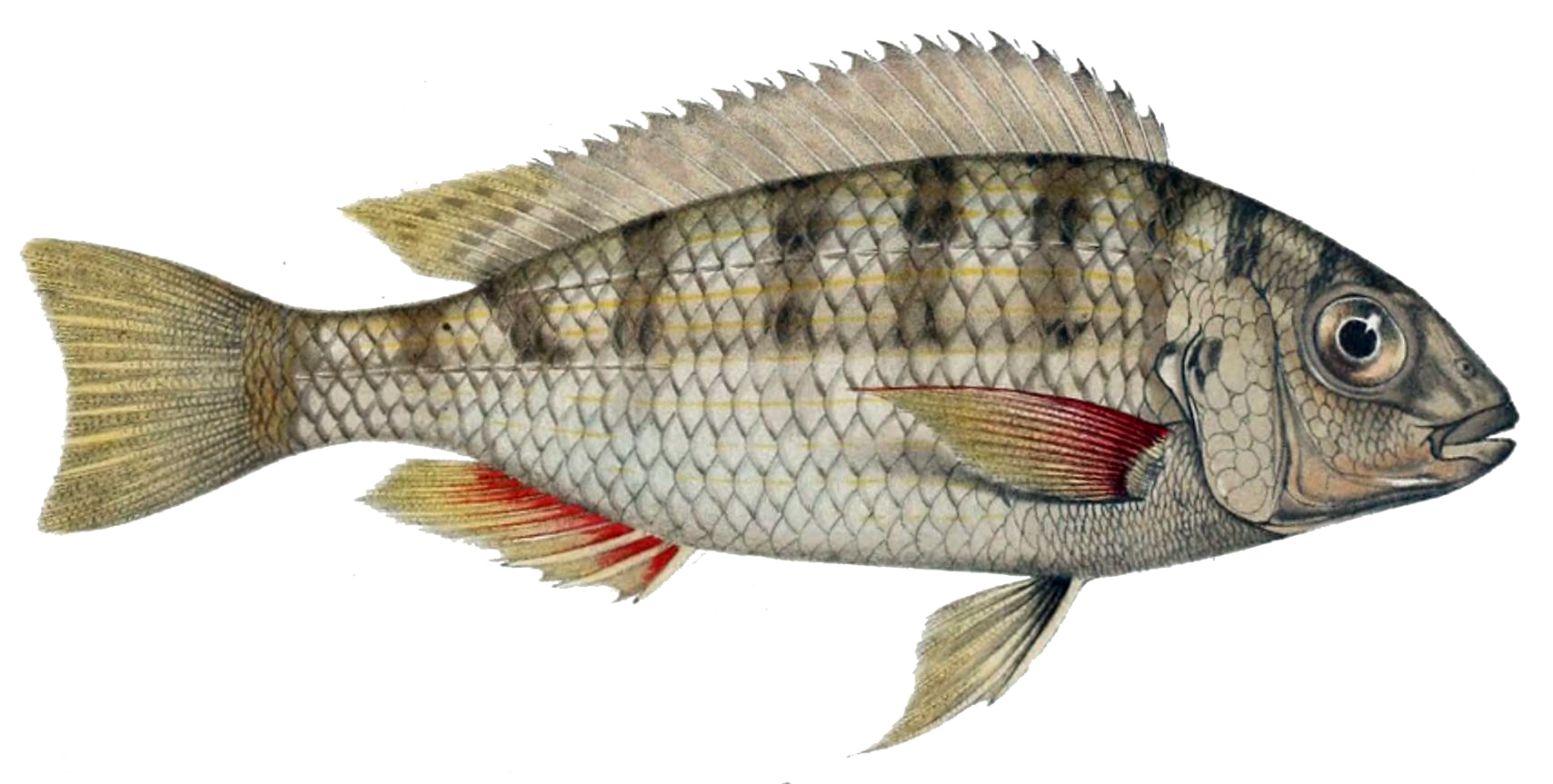

Conservation status
- Least Concern (IUCN 3.1)

Scientific classification
- Kingdom: Animalia
- Phylum: Chordata
- Class: Actinopterygii
- Order: Cichliformes
- Family: Cichlidae
- Subfamily: Pseudocrenilabrinae
- Tribe: Tropheini
- Genus: Limnotilapia; Regan, 1920
- Species: L. dardennii

Binomial name
- Limnotilapia dardennii (Boulenger, 1899)

Synonyms
- Tilapia dardennii Boulenger, 1899; Pelmatochromis loveridgei Borodin, 1931; Limnochromis loveridgei (Borodin, 1931)

= Limnotilapia dardennii =

Species of fish

Limnotilapia dardennii, the latticed cichlid, is a species of cichlid endemic to Lake Tanganyika, where it prefers rocky areas near the coast. It may also be found in the aquarium trade. This species is currently the only known member of its genus.

== Description ==
On colour these fish are yellowish olive on the upperparts and silvery on the ventral surfaces, it is marked with eleven dark vertical bars starting between the eyes, the fins are yellowish with the dorsal fin marbled with olive and the pectoral fin and anal fin have red bases. The males of this species can reach a total length of 26 cm (10 in), and females can reach a length of 18 cm (7.1 in).

== Distribution ==
Limnotilapia dardennii is widely distributed in Lake Tanganyika and it also occurs in the delta of the Malagarasi River. It occurs in Zambia, Tanzania, Burundi and the Democratic Republic of Congo.

== Habitat and biology ==
Limnotilapia dardennii lives close to the shore, preferring sandy areas to rocky zones. Juvenile fish live in shallower waters over sand and mud substrates while the adults prefer deeper waters and rocky substrates. It is an omnivore with much of its diet consisting of plant material such as algae, phytoplankton and vascular plants. It is also known to feed on worms and the eggs of other fishes. It is regarded as closest to the ancestral form of species within its grouping which are browsers and grazers of algae as it shows the least specialisation of that group.

== Human use and threats ==
This species is fished for human consumption, mostly using beach seines, it is also threatened by increased sedimentation of the inshore waters of Lake Tanganyika caused by erosion in the watersheds of the inflowing rivers. It is sometimes found in the aquarium trade.

== Name ==
The specific name hours the painter Léon Dardenne (1865-1912) who was an illustrator on the Congo Free State expedition to Lake Tanganyika on which the type of this species was collected. Boulenger said the native name for this fish was "sangani"
