= Triglachromis otostigma =

Conservation status
- Least Concern (IUCN 3.1)

Scientific classification
- Kingdom: Animalia
- Phylum: Chordata
- Class: Actinopterygii
- Order: Cichliformes
- Family: Cichlidae
- Subfamily: Pseudocrenilabrinae
- Tribe: Limnochromini
- Genus: Triglachromis; Poll & Thys van den Audenaerde, 1974
- Species: T. otostigma

Binomial name
- Triglachromis otostigma (Regan, 1920)

Synonyms
- Limnochromis otostigma Regan, 1920

Species of fish

Triglachromis otostigma is a species of cichlid endemic to Lake Tanganyika in Africa where it prefers waters with a muddy substrate. This species can reach a length of 12 centimetres (4.7 in) TL. It can also be found in the aquarium trade. It is currently the only known member of its genus.
