= Pseudosimochromis margaretae =

Conservation status
- Critically Endangered (IUCN 3.1)

Scientific classification
- Kingdom: Animalia
- Phylum: Chordata
- Class: Actinopterygii
- Division: Teleostei
- Order: Cichliformes
- Family: Cichlidae
- Genus: Pseudosimochromis
- Species: P. margaretae

Binomial name
- Pseudosimochromis margaretae (G. S. Axelrod & J. A. Harrison, 1978)

Synonyms
- Simochromis margaretae G.S. Axelrod & J.A. Harrison, 1978

Species of fish

Pseudosimochromis margaretae is a species of cichlid endemic to Lake Tanganyika where it is only known from the area of Kigoma in Tanzania. It prefers waters with rock-rubble substrates, mostly at less than 5 metres (16 ft) but not deeper than 10 metres (33 ft). It can reach a length of 8.1 centimetres (3.2 in) SL. It can also be found in the aquarium trade.

== Etymology ==
The specific name honours Margaret Mary Smith (1916-1987), who was the first director of the J. L. B. Smith Institute of Ichthyology.
