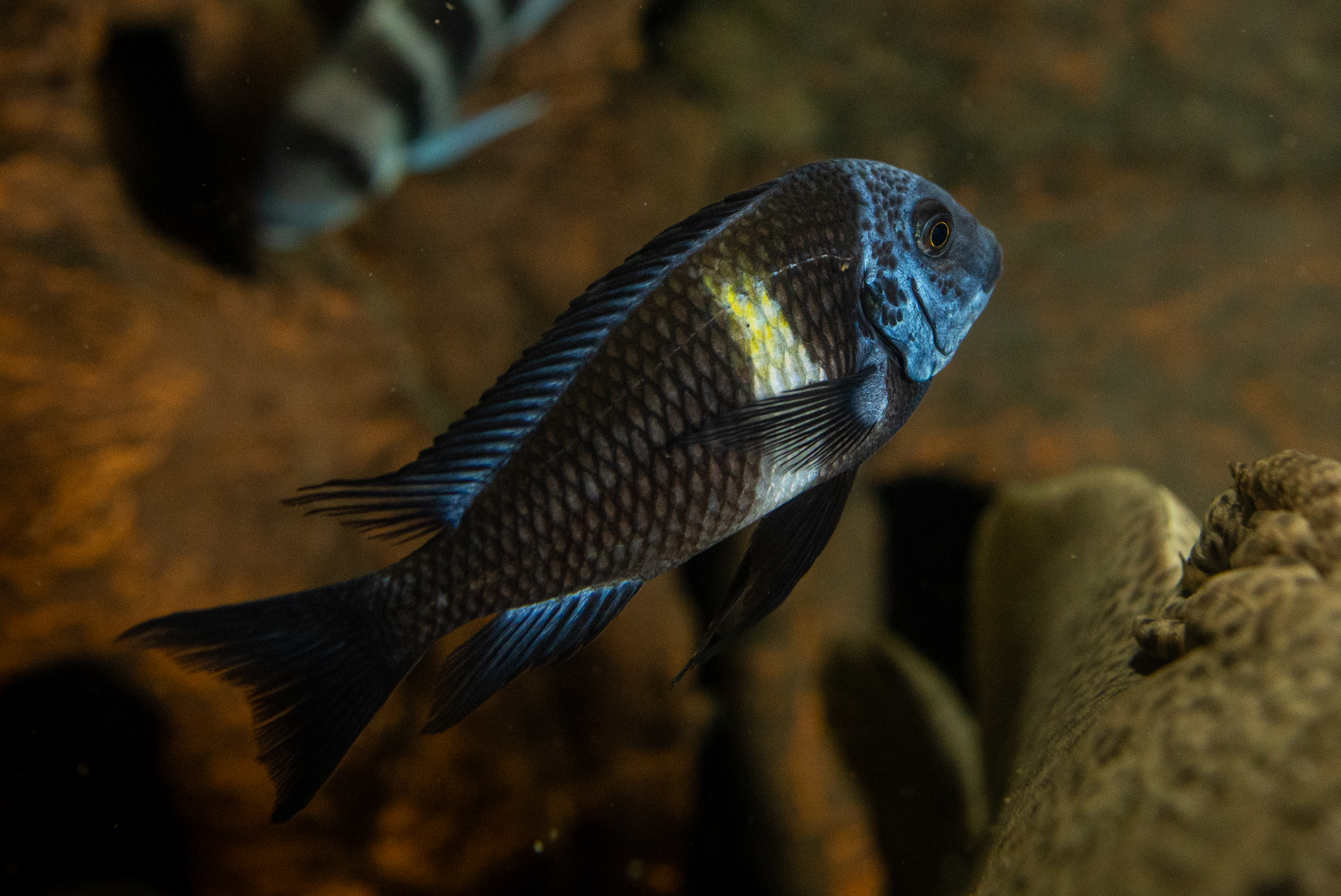

Conservation status
- Endangered (IUCN 3.1)

Scientific classification
- Kingdom: Animalia
- Phylum: Chordata
- Class: Actinopterygii
- Division: Teleostei
- Order: Cichliformes
- Family: Cichlidae
- Genus: Tropheus
- Species: T. duboisi

Binomial name
- Tropheus duboisi Marlier, 1959

= Tropheus duboisi =

Species of fish

Tropheus duboisi, the white spotted cichlid, is a species of cichlid endemic to Lake Tanganyika. It can reach a length of 12 cm (4.7 in).

== Distribution and habitat ==
The species is found only in Lake Tanganyika, restricted to rocky substrates (rubble or slabs) in the northern portion of the lake. It occurs to a depth of 30 m. Three subpopulations are distinguished in different parts of the lake: "Maswa", "Karilani Island", and "Kigoma".

== Ecology ==
T. duboisi cichlids feed on the algae growing on the rocky substrate they frequent. The species engages in mouth-brooding; eggs are hatched in the mother's mouth, and young fish use it as shelter for some time after hatching.

== Conservation ==
The species is classified as vulnerable due to their small estimated population size (a few thousand) and restricted distribution. It is heavily in demand in the aquarium trade, and likely impacted to some degree by increases in sedimentation in its natural habitat.

== Etymology ==
The specific name honours the collector of the type, the limnologist Jean Dubois, who was Marlier's colleague.

== See also ==
- List of freshwater aquarium fish species
