= Pseudosimochromis marginatus =

Conservation status
- Least Concern (IUCN 3.1)

Scientific classification
- Kingdom: Animalia
- Phylum: Chordata
- Class: Actinopterygii
- Order: Cichliformes
- Family: Cichlidae
- Genus: Pseudosimochromis
- Species: P. marginatus

Binomial name
- Pseudosimochromis marginatus (Poll, 1956)

Synonyms
- Simochromis marginatus Poll, 1956

Species of fish

Pseudosimochromis marginatus is a species of cichlid endemic to Lake Tanganyika in East Africa. It prefers shallow waters with rock rubble substrates. It can reach a length of 10 centimetres (3.9 in) TL. It can also be found in the aquarium trade.
