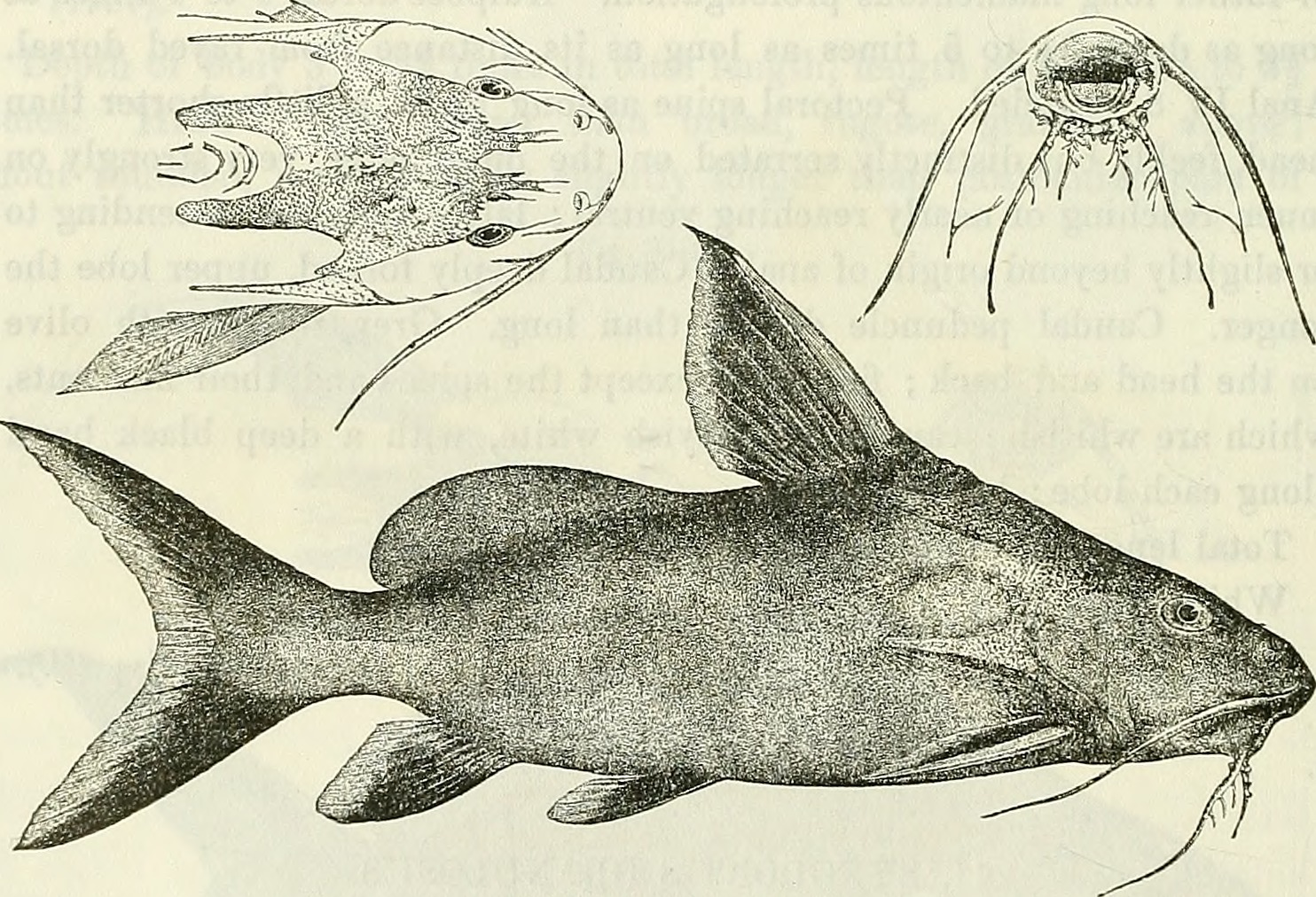

Conservation status
- Least Concern (IUCN 3.1)

Scientific classification
- Kingdom: Animalia
- Phylum: Chordata
- Class: Actinopterygii
- Order: Siluriformes
- Family: Mochokidae
- Genus: Synodontis
- Species: S. granulosus

Binomial name
- Synodontis granulosus Boulenger, 1900

Synonyms
- Synodontis granulosa (feminine form)

= Synodontis granulosus =

Species of fish

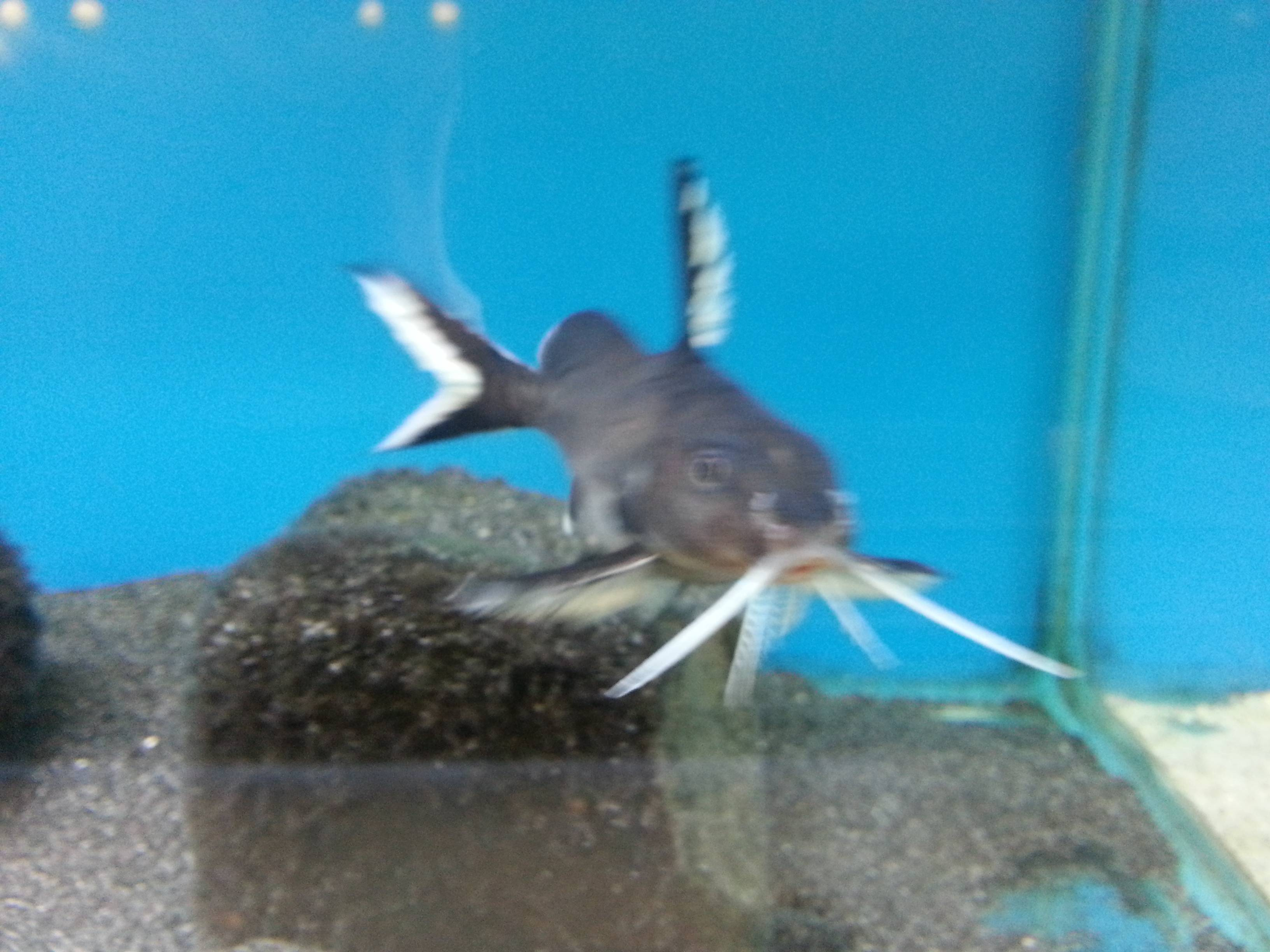

Synodontis granulosus is a species of upside-down catfish endemic to the Democratic Republic of the Congo, Burundi, Zambia, and Tanzania, where it is only known from Lake Tanganyika. It was first described by Belgian-British zoologist George Albert Boulenger in 1900, from specimens collected at multiple points along the shore of Lake Tanganyika. The species name comes from the Latin word "granulum", meaning of grain, and refers to the granular papillae present on the skin of the fish's body.

== Description ==
Like all members of the genus Synodontis, S. granulosus has a strong, bony head capsule that extends back as far as the first spine of the dorsal fin. The head is about 3/10 of the standard length of the fish. The head contains a distinct narrow, bony, external protrusion called a humeral process. The shape and size of the humeral process help to identify the species. In S. granulosus, the humeral process is narrow, long, and rough in appearance, with a distinct ridge on the bottom edge. The top edge is concave and the end is sharply pointed. It is about 2/3 of the length of the head. The diameter of the eye is about 1/7 of the length of the head.

The fish has three pairs of barbels. The maxillary barbels are located on the upper jaw, and two pairs of mandibular barbels are on the lower jaw. The maxillary barbel has a narrow membrane attached near the base and is straight without any branches. It extends at least as far as the base of the pectoral fin, slightly longer than the length of the head and 3/10 of the standard length of the body. The outer pair of mandibular barbels extends just short of the pectoral girdle, about 7/10 of the length of the head, and contains four to five branches without secondary branches. The inner pair of mandibular barbels is about half as long as the outer pair, about 1/4 of the length of the head, with two pairs of branches, without any secondary branches present.

The skin of S. granulosus has a large number of tiny vertical skin folds. The exact purpose of the skin folds is not known, but is a characteristic of the species of Syndontis that are endemic to Lake Tanganyika. External granular papilla are present and extend onto all of the fins.

The front edges of the dorsal fins and the pectoral fins of Syntontis species are hardened into stiff spines. In S. granulosus, the spine of the dorsal fin is long, about as long as the head, is almost completely straight, is smooth on the front and serrated on the back, and ends with short, black filament. The remaining portion of the dorsal fin is made up of seven to eight branching rays. The spine of the pectoral fin is slightly curved, almost as long as the dorsal fin spine, with small serrations on the front and large serrations on the back. The pectoral spine ends in short, black filament. The rest of the pectoral fins are made up of seven to eight branching rays. The adipose fin does not contain any rays, is long and well developed, and has a convex shape. The pelvic fin contains one unbranched and six to seven branched rays. The front edge of the pelvic fin is vertically forward of the front edge of the adipose fin. The anal fin contains three to five unbranched and seven to nine branched rays; it is vertically aligned with the adipose fin. The tail, or caudal fin, is forked, with pointed lobes, and contains eight rays on the upper lobe, nine rays on the lower lobe.

The mouth of the fish faces downward and has wide lips that contain papilla. All members of Syndontis have a structure called a premaxillary toothpad, which is located on the very front of the upper jaw of the mouth. This structure contains several rows of short, chisel-shaped teeth. In some species, this toothpad is made up of a large patch with several rows in a large cluster. In other species of Syndontis, this toothpad is clearly divided into two separate groups, separated by a thin band of skin that divides the toothpad. This character is used as a method of differentiating between two different but similar species of Syndontis. In S. granulosus, the toothpad is uninterrupted, or continuous without a break. On the lower jaw, or mandible, the teeth of Syndontis are attached to flexible, stalk-like structures and described as "s-shaped" or "hooked". The number of teeth on the mandible is used to differentiate between species; in S. granulosus, there are 28 to 51 teeth on the mandible, arranged in a single row.

Some of the species of Synodontis have an opening or series of openings called the axillary pore. It is located on the sides of the body below the humeral process and before the pectoral fin spine. The exact function of the port is not known to scientists, although its presence has been observed in seven other catfish genera. Fish in the genus Acrochordonichthys are known to secrete a mucus with toxic properties from their axillary pore, but there is no scientific consensus as to the exact purpose of the secretion or the pore. S. granulosus has a large, dark, axillary pore on each side, just below the humeral process.

The body color is slate gray to olive-brown with a dark sheen; juveniles display a spotted pattern that fades with age. The underside ranges from pale yellow to gray. Most of the species of Synodontis of Lake Tanganyika have a recognizable pattern consisting of dark triangles at the bases of all of the rayed fins, present in S. granulosus, and the back edges of the fins are white to yellowish in color. The caudal fin has a black bar that runs from the base of each lobe to the top of the fin. The barbels are white; the bases sometimes have scattered pigmentation.

The maximum standard length of known specimens is 21.6 centimetres (8.5 in) with a total length of 27 centimetres (11 in). Generally, females in the genus Synodontis tend to be slightly larger than males of the same age.

== Habitat and behavior ==
In the wild, the species is endemic to Lake Tanganyika, which has an observed temperature range of 22 to 26 °C (72 to 79 °F), an approximate pH of 8.5 – 9, and a dH range of 4-15. The fish inhabits the littoral to benthic zones in the lake, over shell, sand, and mud bottoms, and has been found at depths of up to 130 metres (430 ft), but most commonly between 20 and 40 metres (66 and 131 ft). The reproductive habits of most of the species of Synodontis are not known, beyond some instances of obtaining egg counts from gravid females. Spawning likely occurs during the flooding season between July and October, and pairs swim in unison during spawning. As a whole, species of Synodontis are omnivores, consuming insect larvae, algae, gastropods, bivalves, sponges, crustaceans, and the eggs of other fishes. The growth rate is rapid in the first year, then slows down as the fish age.
