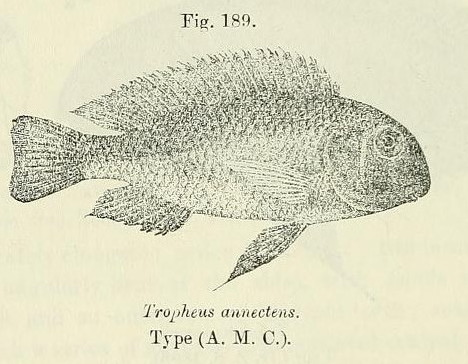

Conservation status
- Endangered (IUCN 3.1)

Scientific classification
- Kingdom: Animalia
- Phylum: Chordata
- Class: Actinopterygii
- Division: Teleostei
- Order: Cichliformes
- Family: Cichlidae
- Genus: Tropheus
- Species: T. annectens

Binomial name
- Tropheus annectens Boulenger, 1900

= Tropheus annectens =

Species of fish

Tropheus annectens is a species of cichlid endemic to Lake Tanganyika, where it is found on a substrate consisting of large, fixed rock. This species can reach a length of 8 cm (3.1 in). It can be found in the aquarium trade.
