= Pseudosimochromis babaulti =

Conservation status
- Least Concern (IUCN 3.1)

Scientific classification
- Kingdom: Animalia
- Phylum: Chordata
- Class: Actinopterygii
- Order: Cichliformes
- Family: Cichlidae
- Genus: Pseudosimochromis
- Species: P. babaulti

Binomial name
- Pseudosimochromis babaulti (Pellegrin, 1927)

Synonyms
- Simochromis babaulti Pellegrin, 1927; Simochromis pleurospilus Nelissen, 1978; Pseudoimochromis pleurospilus (Nelissen, 1978)

Species of fish

Pseudosimochromis babaulti is a species of cichlid endemic to Lake Tanganyika preferring areas with rock-rubble substrates. It can reach a length of 11 centimetres (4.3 in) TL. It can also be found in the aquarium trade.

== Etymology ==
The specific name honours the collector of the type, the French explorer, naturalist and conservationist Guy Babault (1888-ca. 1932).
