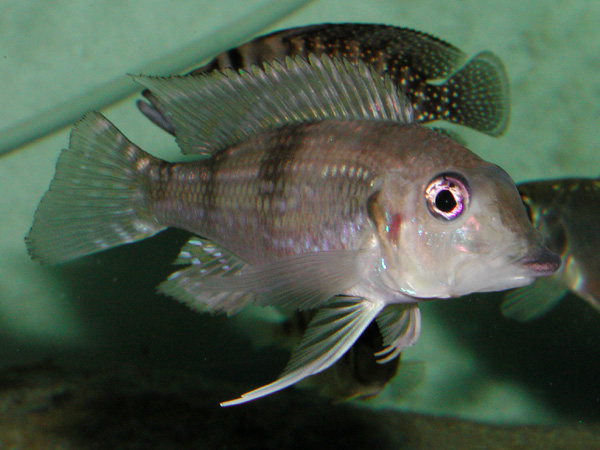

Conservation status
- Least Concern (IUCN 3.1)

Scientific classification
- Kingdom: Animalia
- Phylum: Chordata
- Class: Actinopterygii
- Order: Cichliformes
- Family: Cichlidae
- Genus: Gnathochromis; Poll, 1981
- Species: G. permaxillaris

Binomial name
- Gnathochromis permaxillaris (L. R. David, 1936)

Synonyms
- Limnochromis permaxillaris David, 1936

= Gnathochromis permaxillaris =

Species of fish

Gnathochromis permaxillaris is a species of African fish in the family Cichlidae. It is endemic to relatively deep waters in Lake Tanganyika in the countries of Burundi, the Democratic Republic of the Congo, Tanzania, and Zambia. It is widespread in the lake, but occurs in low densities. It has been recorded as deep as 200 m (660 ft), even in waters virtually devoid of oxygen.

This species reaches up to 15 cm (5.9 in) in length and has an unusual protractile mouth. It feeds on zooplankton and will shift sand, similar to the distantly related Geophagus eartheaters of South America. Like many other Tanganyika cichlids, it is a mouthbrooder and occasionally seen in the aquarium trade.

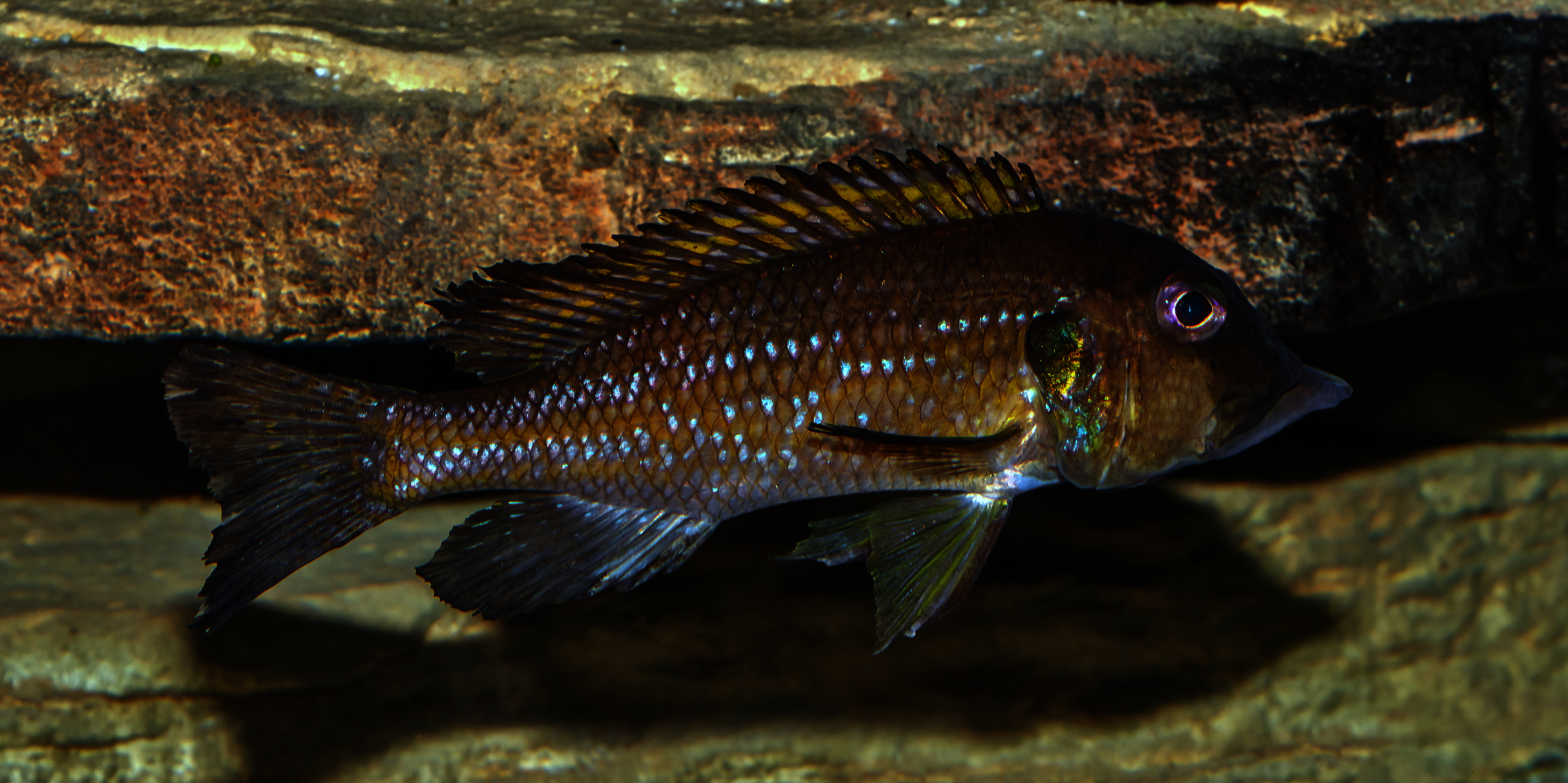
On display in Karlsruhe Zoo
