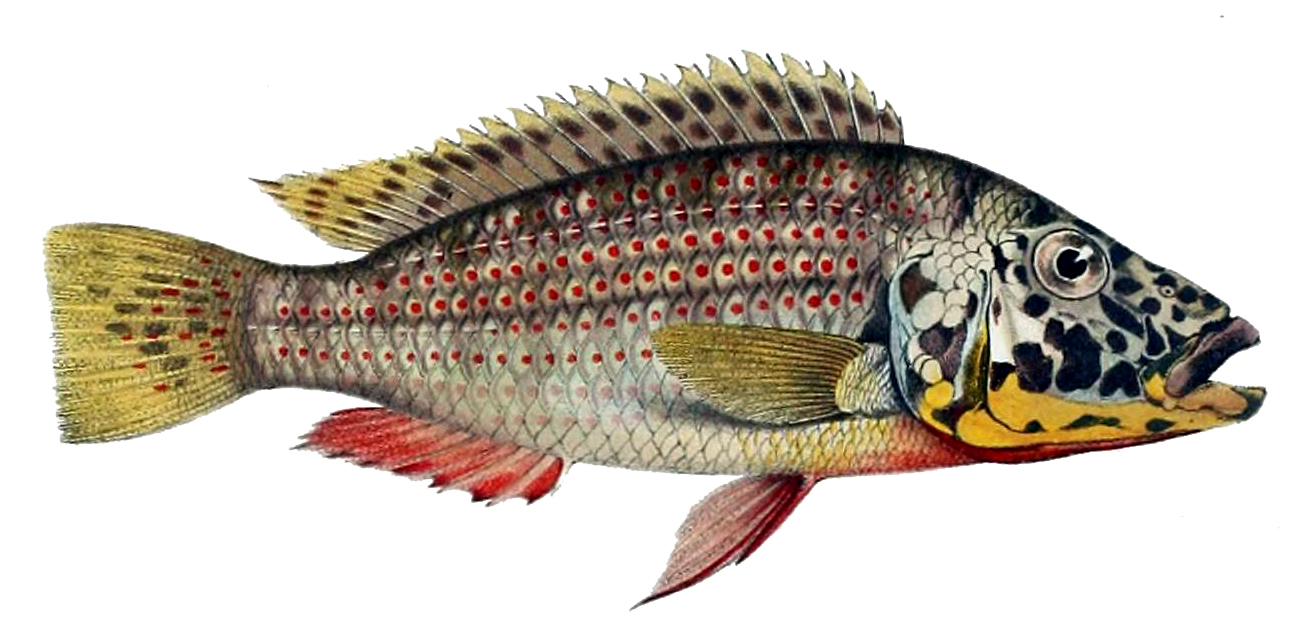

Conservation status
- Least Concern (IUCN 3.1)

Scientific classification
- Kingdom: Animalia
- Phylum: Chordata
- Class: Actinopterygii
- Division: Teleostei
- Order: Cichliformes
- Family: Cichlidae
- Genus: Shuja; Genner, Ngatunga & Turner, 2022
- Species: S. horei

Binomial name
- Shuja horei (Günther, 1894)

Synonyms
- Chromis horei Günther, 1894; Ctenochromis horei (Günther, 1894); Haplochromis horei (Günther, 1894); Tilapia horii (Günther, 1894); Tilapia rubropunctata Boulenger, 1899

= Shuja (fish) =

Species of fish

Shuja horei is a species of haplochromine cichlid which is found in East Africa. It is the only member of the monospecific genus Shuja.

== Description ==
Large individuals, which are classified as being greater than 60 millimetres (2.4 in) long, have black spots on their heads. Males, while foraging, show a distinct orange spot that is located on the anal fin to females as a courtship display.

The males attain lengths of 18–20 centimetres (7.1–7.9 in) and the females 12–15 centimetres (4.7–5.9 in).

== Distribution ==
Shuja horei is found in the basin of Lake Tanganyika in Burundi, the Democratic Republic of the Congo, Tanzania, and Zambia. It is found in Lake Tanganyika itself and in its tributary rivers such as the Ruzizi River and the Nua River, as well as in the outflowing Lukuga River as far as the Kisimba-Kilia rapids.

== Habitat and ecology ==
Shuja horei is ubiquitous within the Lake Tanganyika basin where it occurs over both rock and sand substrates, but shows a preference for habitats with a soft substrate on which grows a sward of aquatic grasses. This is a species of shallow water species along the lakeshore and in the lower reaches of the tributary rivers. It is omnivorous, but the adults are mainly piscivorous. The females are mouthbrooders, brooding both eggs and fry in their mouth Dominant males have been found to defend a spawning female from other males in the area. The dominant males have a harem of females but other males will sneakily mate with the females when they can.

== Threats ==
Shuja horei is threatened by increases in water turbidity and siltation in shallows caused by agriculture and forestry in the Lake Tanganyika drainage basin, it is also threatened by over-fishing using beach seine nets.

== Name ==
The specific name honours the British explorer and missionary Captain Edward Coode Hore (1848-1912), who was the collector of the type.
