= List of critically endangered fishes =

- Extinct in the wild (EW): 11 species
- Critically endangered (CR): 906 species
- Endangered (EN): 1,533 species
- Vulnerable (VU): 1,740 species
- Near threatened (NT, LR/cd): 1,042 species
- Least concern (LC): 18,621 species
- Data deficient (DD): 5,492 species
Fish species (IUCN, 2025-2)
- 29,447 extant species have been evaluated
- 23,955 of those are fully assessed (Note: excludes data deficient evaluations.)
- 19,663 are not threatened at present
- 4,292 to 9,784 are threatened (Note: Threatened comprises CR, EN and VU. Upper estimate additionally includes DD.)
- 113 to 268 are extinct or extinct in the wild:
  - 102 extinct (EX) species (Note: Chart omits extinct (EX) species)
  - 11 extinct in the wild (EW)
  - 147 possibly extinct [CR(PE)]
  - 8 possibly extinct in the wild [CR(PEW)]

Critically endangered (CR) species face an extremely high risk of extinction in the wild.

As of July 2017, the International Union for Conservation of Nature (IUCN) listed 1,000 critically endangered fish species, including 87 which are tagged as possibly extinct. Of all evaluated fish species, 3.0% are listed as critically endangered. The IUCN also lists four fish subspecies as critically endangered.

Of the subpopulations of fish evaluated by the IUCN, 20 species subpopulations and one subspecies subpopulation have been assessed as critically endangered.

Additionally 3191 fish species (21% of those evaluated) are listed as data deficient, meaning there is insufficient information for a full assessment of conservation status. As these species typically have small distributions and/or populations, they are intrinsically likely to be threatened, according to the IUCN. While the category data deficient indicates that no assessment of extinction risk has been made for the taxa, the IUCN notes that it may be appropriate to give them "the same degree of attention as threatened taxa, at least until their status can be assessed".

This is a complete list of critically endangered fish species and subspecies evaluated by the IUCN. Species considered possibly extinct by the IUCN are marked as such. Species and subspecies which have critically endangered subpopulations (or stocks) are indicated.

== Cartilaginous fishes ==
Cartilaginous fishes include sharks, rays, skates, and shovelnose rays. The majority of the order Rhinopristiformes, which includes sawfish, guitarfish, wedgefish, and other shovelnose rays, is considered critically endangered, with 28 of its 64 evaluated species considered critically endangered by the IUCN.

=== Carchariniformes ===
- Borneo shark (Carcharhinus borneensis)
- Pacific smalltail shark (Carcharhinus cerdale)
- Pondicherry shark (Carcharhinus hemiodon)
- Oceanic whitetip shark (Carcharhinus longimanus)
- Lost shark (Carcharhinus obsoletus) (possibly extinct)
- Smalltail shark (Carcharhinus porosus)
- Whitefin swellshark (Cephaloscyllium albipinnum)
- Reticulated swellshark (Cephaloscyllium fasciatum)
- Sarawak pygmy swellshark (Cephaloscyllium sarawakensis)
- Indian swellshark (Cephaloscyllium silasi)
- Winghead shark (Eusphyra blochii)
- Tope (Galeorhinus galeus)
- Ganges shark (Glyphus gangeticus)
- Whitefin topeshark (Hemitriakis leucoperiptera)
- Daggernose shark (Isogomphon oxyrhynchus)
- Striped smoothhound (Mustelus fasciatus)
- Speckled smoothhound (Mustelus mento)
- Narrownose smoothhound (Mustelus schmitti)
- Humpback smoothhound (Mustelus whitneyi)
- Winghead shark (Eusphyra blochii)
- Scalloped bonnethead (Sphyrna corona)
- Scalloped hammerhead (Sphyrna lewini)
- Scoophead (Sphyrna media)
- Great hammerhead (Sphyrna mokarran)
- Smalleye hammerhead (Sphyrna tudes)
- Spotted houndshark (Triakis maculata)

=== Lamniformes ===
- Sand tiger shark (Carcharius taurus)

=== Orectolobiformes ===
- Shorttail nurse shark (Pseudoginglymostoma brevicaudatum)

=== Squaliformes ===
- Dwarf gulper shark (Centrophorus atromarginatus)

=== Squatiniformes ===
- Sawback angelshark (Squatina aculeata)
- Argentine angelshark (Squatina argentina)
- Chilean angelshark (Squatina armata)
- Japanese angelshark (Squatina japonica)
- Indonesian angelshark (Squatina legnota)
- Hidden angelshark (Squatina occulta)
- Smoothback angelshark (Squatina oculata)
- Angelshark (Squatina squatina)

=== Rajiformes ===
- Common blue skate (Dipturus batis)
- Longnose skate (Dipturus confusa)
- Bignose fanskate (Sympterygia acuta)
- Flapper skate (Dipturus intermedius)
- Menni's skate (Dipturus mennii)
- Korean skate (Hongeo koreana)
- Maltese skate (Leucoraja melitensis)
- Spotback skate (Atlantoraja castelnaui)

=== Myliobatiformes ===
- Wingfin stingray (Fontitrygon geijskesi)
- Smalltooth stingray (Hypanus rudis)
- Colares stingray (Fontitrygon colarensis)
- Smooth stingray (Fontitrygon garouaensis)
- Pakistan whipray (Maculabatis arabica)
- Shorttail whipray (Maculabatis bineeshi)
- Thorny whipray (Fontitrygon ukpam)
- Bentfin devil ray (Mobula thurstoni)
- Smalleye round ray (Urotrygon microphtalmum)
- Reticulate round ray (Urotrygon retiulata)
- Tentacled butterfly ray (Gymnura tentaculata)
- Starrynose cowtail ray (Pastinachus stellurostris)
- Lusitanian cownose ray (Rhinoptera marginata)
- Common eagle ray (Myliobatis aqulia)
- Duckbill eagle ray (Aetomylaeus bovinus)
- Ornate eagle ray (Aetomylaeus vespertilio)
- Shortnose eagle ray (Myliobatis ridens)

=== Rhinopristiformes ===
- Knifetooth sawfish (Anoxypristis cuspidata)
- Dwarf sawfish (Pristis clavata)
- Largetooth sawfish (Pristis pristis)
- Smalltooth sawfish (Pristis pectinata)
- Green sawfish (Pristis zijsron)
- Dwarf sawfish (Pristis clavata)
- Giant guitarfish (Glaucostegus typus)
- Halavi guitarfish (Glaucostegus halavi)
- Bowmouth guitarfish (Rhina ancylostoma)
- Smoothback guitarfish (Rhinobatos lionotus)
- Spineback guitarfish (Rhinobatos irvinei)
- Sharpnose guitarfish (Glaucostegus granulatus)
- Bangladeshi guitarfish (Glaucostegus younholeei)
- Stripenose guitarfish (Acroteriobatus variegatus)
- Clubnose guitarfish (Glaucostegus thouin)
- Widenose guitarfish (Glaucostegus obtusus)
- Annandale's guitarfish (Rhinobatos annandalei)
- Whitespotted guitarfish (Rhynchobatus djiddensis)
- Jimbaran guitarfish (Rhinobatos jimbaraensis)
- Brown guitarfish (Rhinobatos schlegeii)
- Blackchin guitarfish (Glaucostegus cemiculus)
- Annandale's guitarfish, Bengal guitarfish (Rhinobatos annandalei)
- Brazilian guitarfish (Pseudobatus horkelii)
- Common guitarfish (Rhinobatos rhinobatos)
- Philippine guitarfish (Rhinobatos whitei)
- Broadnose wedgefish (Rhynchobatus springeri)
- Bottlenose wedgefish (Rhynchobatus australiae)
- Smoothnose wedgefish (Rhynchobatus laevis)
- African wedgefish (Rhynchobatus luebberti)
- Taiwanese wedgefish (Rhynchobatus immaculatus)
- Roughnose wedgefish (Rhynchobatus cooki)
- Whitespotted wedgefish (Rhinobatos albomaculatus)
- Brown guitarfish (Rhinobatos schlegelii)
- Japanese wedgefish (Rhynchobatus mononoke)
- False shark ray (Rhynchorhina mauritaniensis)

=== Torpediniformes ===
- Red Sea torpedo (Torpedo suessii) (possibly extinct)
- Argentine torpedo (Tetronarce puelcha)

Subpopulations

- Sand tiger shark (Carcharias taurus) (2 subpopulations)
- Giant freshwater stingray (Himantura polylepis) (1 subpopulation)
- Spiny dogfish (Squalus acanthias) (1 subpopulation)

== Ray-finned fishes ==
There are 431 species, four subspecies, four subpopulations of species, and one subpopulations of subspecies of ray-finned fish assessed as critically endangered.

=== Acipenseriformes ===
Acipenseriformes includes sturgeons and paddlefishes. There are 19 species and eight subpopulations in the order Acipenseriformes assessed as critically endangered.

==== Acipenseridae ====
Species

- Siberian sturgeon (Huso baerii)
- Russian sturgeon (Acipenser gueldenstaedtii)
- Sakhalin sturgeon (Acipenser mikadoi)
- Adriatic sturgeon (Acipenser naccarii)
- Bastard sturgeon (Acipenser nudiventris)
- Persian sturgeon (Acipenser persicus)
- Japanese sturgeon (Acipenser schrenckii)
- Chinese sturgeon (Acipenser sinensis)
- Starry sturgeon (Acipenser stellatus)
- European sea sturgeon (Acipenser sturio)
- Kaluga (Huso dauricus)
- Beluga (Huso huso)
- Syr Darya sturgeon (Pseudoscaphirhynchus fedtschenkoi) (possibly extinct)
- Dwarf sturgeon (Pseudoscaphirhynchus hermanni)
- Amu Darya sturgeon (Pseudoscaphirhynchus kaufmanni)
- Pallid sturgeon (Scaphirhynchus albus)
- Alabama sturgeon (Scaphirhynchus suttkusi)

Subpopulations

- Lake sturgeon (Acipenser fulvescens) (3 subpopulations)
- Russian sturgeon (Acipenser gueldenstaedtii) (2 subpopulations)
- Ship sturgeon (Acipenser nudiventris) (1 subpopulation)
- Atlantic sturgeon (Acipenser oxyrinchus) (1 subpopulation)
- Stellate sturgeon (Acipenser stellatus) (2 subpopulations)
- Beluga (Huso huso) (2 subpopulations)
- American paddlefish (Polyodon spathula) (1 subpopulation)
- Pallid sturgeon (Scaphirhynchus albus) (3 subpopulations)

=== Salmoniformes ===
Species

- Coregonus atterensis
- Coregonus austriacus
- Ammersee kilch (Coregonus bavaricus)
- Coregonus danneri
- Stechlin cisco (Coregonus fontanae)
- Atlantic whitefish (Coregonus huntsmani)
- Coregonus lucinensis
- Shortnose cisco (Coregonus reighardi) (possibly extinct)
- Coregonus trybomi
- Coregonus vessicus
- Sichuan taimen (Hucho bleekeri)
- Apache trout (Oncorhynchus apache)
- Formosan landlocked salmon (Oncorhynchus formosanus)
- Oncorhynchus sp. nov 'Acaponeta trout'
- Oncorhynchus sp. nov 'Baluarte trout'
- Oncorhynchus sp. nov 'Northern conchos trout'
- Sakhalin taimen (Parahucho perryi)
- Struga trout (Salmo balcanicus) (possibly extinct)
- Carpione del Garda (Salmo carpio)
- Mediterranean trout (Salmo cettii)
- Kezenoi-am trout (Salmo ezenami)
- Fibreno trout (Salmo fibreni)
- Sevan trout (Salmo ischchan)
- Isli trout (Salmo viridis)
- Salvelinus obtusus
- Salvelinus salvelinoinsularis
- Salvelinus willughbii

Subpopulations of species

- Sockeye salmon (Oncorhynchus nerka) (4 subpopulations)
- Atlantic salmon (Salmo salar) (1 subpopulation)

Subpopulations of subspecies

- Aral sea trout (Salmo trutta aralensis) (1 subpopulation)

=== Silversides ===
- Atherinella jiloaensis
- Bedotia tricolor
- Daintree rainbowfish (Cairnsicthys bitaeniatus)
- Sentani rainbowfish (Chilatherina sentaniensis)
- Scowling silverside (Chirostoma aculeatum)
- Alberca silverside (Chriostoma bartoni)
- Least silverside (Chirostoma charai)
- Blunthead silverside (Chirostoma melanoccus)
- Patzcuaro silverside (Chirostoma patzcuaro)
- Toluca silverside (Chirostoma rojai)
- Craterocephalus dalhousiensis
- Craterocephalus fluiatailis
- Craterocephalus kailolae
- Grime rainbowfish (Glossolepis doritiyi)
- Lake Wanam rainbowfish (Glossolepis wanamensis)
- Bleher's blue-eye (Kiunga bleheri)
- Melanotaenia ajamaruensis
- Bowman's rainbowfish (Melanotaenia bowmani)
- Corona rainbowfish (Melanotaenia corona)
- Klasio rainbowfish (Melanotaenia klasioensis)
- Kokas rainbowfish (Melanotaenia kokasensis)
- Mbuta rainbowfish (Melanotaenia launosa)
- Longspined rainbowfish (Melanotaenia longspinia)
- Lake Furnusu rainbowfish (Melanotaenia mairiasi)
- Melanotaenia oktwsiensis
- Melanotaenia parva
- Kumawa rainbowfish (Melanotaenia sneideri)
- Malanda rainbowfish (Melanotaenia sp. nov. 'Malanda')
- Melanotaenia sp. nov. 'Running River'
- Susi rainbowfish (Melanotaenia susii)
- Urisa rainbowfish (Melanotaenia urisa)
- Neostethus ctenophorus
- Neostethus robertsi
- Paeatherina labiosa
- Mbuta rainbowfish (Pelangia mbutaensis)
- Alchichica silverside (Poblana alchichica)
- Chipnahupan silverside (Poblana ferdebeueni)
- La Preciosa silverside (Poblana letholepis)
- Quechulac silverside (Poblana squamata)
- Pseudomugil paskai
- Vogelkop blue-eye (Pseudomugil reticulatus)
- Rheocles derhami
- Rheocles lateralis
- Giant hardyhead (Sashatherina gigantea)
- Red-finned blue-eye (Scaturiginichthys vermeilipinnis)

=== Toothcarps ===
Species

- Patzcuaro allotoca (Allotoca diazi)
- Blackspot allotoca (Allotoca maculata)
- Anablepsoides speciosus
- Kızılırmak toothcarp (Aphanius danfordii)
- Sahara aphanius (Aphanius saourensis)
- Azraq toothcarp (Aphanius sirhani)
- Acıgöl toothcarp (Aphanius transgrediens)
- Aphyolebias claudiae (possibly extinct)
- Aplocheilichthys sp. 'Baringo'
- Austrolebias cinereus
- Rainbow goodeid (Characodon lateralis)
- Devils Hole pupfish (Cyprinodon diabolis)
- Bighead pupfish (Cyprinodon pachycephalus)
- Pahrump poolfish (Empetrichthys latos)
- Epiplatys coccinatus
- Epiplatys ruhkopfi
- Fundulopanchax powelli (possibly extinct)
- Emerald aphyosemion (Fundulopanchax scheeli)
- Widemouth gambusia (Gambusia eurystoma)
- Highland splitfin (Girardinichthys turneri)
- Chapultepec splitfin (Girardinichthys viviparus)
- Cuatro cienegas killifish (Lucania interioris)
- Nothobranchius fuscotaeniatus
- Pantanodon sp. 'Manombo' (possibly extinct)
- Broadspotted molly (Poecilia latipunctata)
- Kindia killi (Scriptaphyosemion cauveti)
- Scriptaphyosemion etzeli
- Simpsonichthys constanciae
- Tellia apoda
- Valencia letourneuxi
- Tequila splitfin (Zoogoneticus tequila)

Subspecies

- Epiplatys fasciolatus josianae
- Ejagham killi (Fundulopanchax gardneri lacustris)

=== Cypriniformes ===
Cypriniformes includes carps, minnows, loaches and relatives. There are 145 species, one subspecies, and one subpopulation in the order Cypriniformes assessed as critically endangered.

==== Hillstream loaches ====
- Barbatula eregliensis
- Mesonoemacheilus herrei
- Nemacheilus dori
- Blind cave loach (Nemacheilus troglocataractus)
- Galilean loach (Oxynoemacheilus galilaeus)
- Iznik loach (Oxynoemacheilus phoxinoides)
- Samanti loach (Oxynoemacheilus seyhanensis)
- Oxynoemacheilus simavica
- Halap loach (Oxynoemacheilus tigris)
- Diyarbakir loach (Paraschistura chrysicristinae) (possibly extinct)
- Schistura leukensis
- Schistura nasifilis (possibly extinct)
- Schistura papulifera
- Schistura spiloptera
- Schistura tenura (possibly extinct)
- Sewellia albisuera
- Butterfly loach (Sewellia breviventralis)
- Sphaerophysa dianchiensis
- Yunnanilus discoloris

==== True loaches ====
- Cobitis illyrica
- Cobitis jadovaensis
- Diyarbakir spined loach (Cobitis kellei) (possibly extinct)
- Bithynian spined loach (Cobitis splendens)
- Cobitis stephanidisi
- Cobitis taurica
- Ayumodoki (Parabotia curtus)

==== Cyprinids ====
Species

- Giant salmon carp (Aaptosyax grypus)
- Long-spine bream (Acanthobrama centisquama) (possibly extinct)
- Arabian bream (Acanthobrama hadiyahensis)
- Damascus bream (Acanthobrama tricolor) (possibly extinct)
- Elongate bitterling (Acheilognathus elongatus)
- Alburnus macedonicus
- Central Anatolian bleak (Alburnus nasreddini)
- Karasu Sha kuli (Alburnus timarensis)
- Alburnus vistonicus
- Anabarilius andersoni
- Anabarilius qiluensis (possibly extinct)
- Anabarilius yangzonensis (possibly extinct)
- Siamese bala-shak (Balantiocheilos ambusticauda) (possibly extinct)
- Bangana decorus
- Wayanad mahseer (Barbodes wynaadensis)
- Barbus boboi
- Barbus carcharhinoides
- Twee River redfin (Barbus erubescens)
- Petropsaro (Barbus euboicus)
- Barbus melanotaenia
- Barbus ruasae
- Banhine barb (Barbus sp. 'Banhine')
- Haditha cavefish (Caecocypris basimi) (possibly extinct)
- Egirdir longsnout scraper (Capoeta pestai)
- Giant barb (Catlocarpio siamensis)
- Tepehuan shiner (Cyprinella alvarezdelvillari)
- Largemouth shiner (Cyprinella bocagrande)
- Cyprinus barbatus (possibly extinct)
- Cyprinus fuxianensis
- Cyprinus ilishaestomus (possibly extinct)
- Dianchi carp (Cyprinus micristius) (possibly extinct)
- Cyprinus qionghaiensis (possibly extinct)
- Cyprinus yunnanensis (possibly extinct)
- Delminichthys jadovensis
- Delminichthys krbavensis
- Red-tailed black shark (Epalzeorhynchos bicolor)
- Bonytail chub (Gila elegans)
- Gobio delyamurei
- Cappadocian gudgeon (Gobio gymnostethus)
- Taurus gudgeon (Gobio hettitorum)
- Cihanbeyli gudgeon (Gobio insuyanus)
- Hampala lopezi
- Horalabiosa arunachalami
- Hypselobarbus pulchellus (possibly extinct)
- Red Canarese barb (Hypselobarbus thomassi)
- Labeo curriei
- Labeo lankae
- Clanwilliam sandfish (Labeo seeberi)
- White River spinedace (Lepidomeda albivallis)
- Leopard barbel (Luciobarbus subquincunciatus)
- Moapa dace (Moapa coriacea)
- Bovany barb (Neolissochilus bovanicus) (possibly extinct)
- Papaloapan chub (Notropis moralesi)
- Parachondrostoma arrigonis
- Deolali minnow (Parapsilorhynchus prateri) (possibly extinct)
- Epirus minnow (Pelasgus epiroticus)
- Pelasgus laconicus
- Pethia bandula
- Pookode Lake barb (Pethia pookodensis)
- Phoxinellus dalmaticus
- Woundfin (Plagopterus argentissimus)
- Poropuntius chonglingchungi (possibly extinct)
- Burchell's redfin (Pseudobarbus burchelli)
- Azerbaijani spring roach (Pseudophoxinus atropatenus)
- Sultan Sazlığı minnow (Pseudophoxinus elizavetae)
- Marqiyah spring minnow (Pseudophoxinus hasani)
- Sandıklı spring minnow (Pseudophoxinus maeandricus)
- Onaç spring minnow (Pseudophoxinus ninae)
- Akstafa spring roach (Pseudophoxinus sojuchbulagi) (possibly extinct)
- Barada spring minnow (Pseudophoxinus syriacus) (possibly extinct)
- Labeo jordanovo (Ptychidio jordani)
- Deccan barb (Puntius deccanensis) (possibly extinct)
- Scaphognathops theunensis
- Greek rudd (Scardinius graecus)
- Scardinius racovitzai
- Scardinius scardafa
- Kunming snout trout (Schizothorax grahami)
- Schizothorax integrilabiatus
- Snow trout (Schizothorax nepalensis)
- Rara snowtrout (Schizothorax raraensis)
- Golden line fish (Sinocyclocheilus grahami)
- Yangzong golden-line barbel (Sinocyclocheilus yangzongensis)
- Cappadocian chub (Squalius cappadocicus)
- Squalius sp. 'Evia'
- Systomus compressiformis (possibly extinct)
- Flatjaw minnow (Tampichthys mandibularis)
- Telestes fontinalis
- Telestes polylepis
- Telestes turskyi
- Somphongs's rasbora (Trigonostigma somphongsi)
- Ammiq garra (Tylognathus festai)
- Haditha cave garra (Typhlogarra widdowsoni)
- Varicorhinus platystoma
- Varicorhinus ruandae
- Kunming nase (Xenocypris yunnanensis)

Subspecies

- Rhodeus ocellatus smithii

Subpopulations

- Common carp (Cyprinus carpio) (1 subpopulation)

==== Psilorhynchids ====
- Psilorhynchus tenura

==== Suckers ====
- June sucker (Chasmistes liorus)
- Razorback sucker (Xyrauchen texanus)

=== Osmeriformes ===
Includes freshwater smelts and allies.

- Roundhead galaxias (Galaxias anomalus)
- Lowland longjaw galaxias (Galaxias cobitinis)
- Eldon's galaxias (Galaxias eldoni)
- Gollum galaxias (Galaxias gollumoides)
- Bignose galaxias (Galaxias macronasus)
- Pedder galaxias (Galaxias pedderensis)
- Longjawed galaxias (Galaxias prognathus)
- Dusky galaxias (Galaxias pullus)
- Flathead galaxias (Galaxias rostratus)
- Saddled galaxias (Galaxias tanycephalus)
- Delta smelt (Hypomesus transpacificus)
- Canterbury mudfish (Neochanna burrowsius)
- Northland mudfish (Neochanna heleios)

=== Catfishes ===
- Aposturisoma myriodon
- Astroblepus formosus
- Andean catfish (Astroblepus ubidiai)
- Ceratoglanis pachynema
- Chiloglanis polyodon
- Chiloglanis ruziziensis
- Clarias cavernicola
- Clarias maclareni
- Encheloclarias curtisoma
- Encheloclarias kelioides
- Glyptothorax kashmirensis
- Kudremukh glyptothorax (Glyptothorax kudremukhensis)
- Nilgiri mystus (Hemibagrus punctatus) (possibly extinct)
- Nematogenys inermis
- Chucky madtom (Noturus crypticus)
- Oreoglanis lepturus
- Mekong giant catfish (Pangasianodon gigas)
- Giant pangasius (Pangasius sanitwongsei)
- Phreatobius sanguijuela
- Pimelodus grosskopfii
- Dianchi bullhead (Pseudobagrus medianalis)
- Rhamdella montana
- Rhamdia xetequepeque
- Rhizosomichthys totae (possibly extinct)
- Kunming catfish (Silurus mento)
- Sturisomatichthys frenatus
- Synodontis dekimpei
- Trichomycterus venulosus
- Lake Victoria deepwater catfish (Xenoclarias eupogon) (possibly extinct)

=== Perciformes ===
There are 144 species, one subspecies, and one subpopulation in the order Perciformes assessed as critically endangered.

==== Cichlids ====
Species

- Arrow cichlid (Amphilophus zaliosus)
- Haplochromis aelocephalus (possibly extinct)
- Haplochromis annectidens
- Haplochromis antleter (possibly extinct)
- Haplochromis apogonoides (possibly extinct)
- Haplochromis argenteus (possibly extinct)
- Haplochromis barbarae (possibly extinct)
- Haplochromis bareli (possibly extinct)
- Haplochromis beadlei
- Haplochromis brownae (possibly extinct)
- Haplochromis cassius (possibly extinct)
- Haplochromis cinctus (possibly extinct)
- Haplochromis cnester (possibly extinct)
- Haplochromis coprologus (possibly extinct)
- Haplochromis crassilabris (possibly extinct)
- Haplochromis crocopeplus (possibly extinct)
- Haplochromis dentex (possibly extinct)
- Haplochromis dichrourus (possibly extinct)
- Haplochromis flavipinnis (possibly extinct)
- Haplochromis granti (possibly extinct)
- Haplochromis guiarti (possibly extinct)
- Haplochromis heusinkveldi (possibly extinct)
- Haplochromis hiatus (possibly extinct)
- Haplochromis iris (possibly extinct)
- Haplochromis ishmaeli (possibly extinct)
- Haplochromis katunzii (possibly extinct)
- Haplochromis latifasciatus
- Haplochromis longirostris (possibly extinct)
- Haplochromis macrognathus (possibly extinct)
- Haplochromis martini (possibly extinct)
- Haplochromis michaeli (possibly extinct)
- Haplochromis microdon (possibly extinct)
- Haplochromis mylergates (possibly extinct)
- Haplochromis nanoserranus (possibly extinct)
- Haplochromis obesus
- Haplochromis pancitrinus (possibly extinct)
- Haplochromis parvidens (possibly extinct)
- Haplochromis percoides (possibly extinct)
- Haplochromis perrieri (possibly extinct)
- Haplochromis plutonius (possibly extinct)
- Haplochromis ptistes (possibly extinct)
- Haplochromis pyrrhopteryx (possibly extinct)
- Haplochromis sp. 'Amboseli'
- Haplochromis sphex (possibly extinct)
- Haplochromis sulphureus (possibly extinct)
- Haplochromis teegelaari (possibly extinct)
- Haplochromis teunisrasi
- Haplochromis theliodon (possibly extinct)
- Haplochromis ushindi (possibly extinct)
- Haplochromis victorianus (possibly extinct)
- Haplochromis vonlinnei (possibly extinct)
- Haplochromis xenostoma (possibly extinct)
- Dikume (Konia dikume)
- Konye (Konia eisentrauti)
- Lamprologus kungweensis
- Lipochromis sp. 'backflash cryptodon'
- Lipochromis sp. 'black cryptodon'
- Lipochromis sp. 'parvidens-like'
- Lipochromis sp. 'small obesoid'
- Myaka (Myaka myaka)
- Oreochromis chungruruensis
- Singidia tilapia (Oreochromis esculentus)
- Lake Chala tilapia (Oreochromis hunteri)
- Jipe tilapia (Oreochromis jipe)
- Karomo (Oreochromis karomo)
- Kariba tilapia (Oreochromis mortimeri)
- Oreochromis variabilis
- Orthochromis uvinzae
- Oxylapia polli
- Paratilapia sp. 'Vevembe'
- Damba mipentina (Paretroplus maculatus)
- Pinstripe damba (Paretroplus menarambo)
- Ptychochromis insolitus
- Trondo mainty (Ptychochromoides betsileanus)
- Ptychochromoides vondrozo
- Ptyochromis sp. 'rainbow sheller'
- Ptyochromis sp. 'Rusinga oral sheller'
- Pungu maclareni
- Fissi (Sarotherodon caroli)
- Unga (Sarotherodon linnellii)
- Leka keppe (Sarotherodon lohbergeri)
- Kululu (Sarotherodon steinbachi)
- Nsess (Stomatepia mariae)
- Mongo (Stomatepia mongo)
- Pindu (Stomatepia pindu)
- Teleogramma brichardi
- Tilapia bakossiorum
- Tilapia bemini
- Tilapia bythobates
- Tilapia cessiana
- Tilapia coffea
- Tilapia deckerti
- Tilapia flava
- Otjikoto tilapia (Tilapia guinasana)
- Tilapia gutturosa
- Tilapia imbriferna
- Tilapia snyderae
- Tilapia spongotroktis
- Tilapia thysi
- Xystichromis sp. 'Kyoga flameback'

Subspecies

- Chromidotilapia guntheri loennbergii

==== Percids ====
- Diamond darter (Crystallaria cincotta)
- Vermilion darter (Etheostoma chermocki)
- Tufa darter (Etheostoma lugoi)
- Marbled darter (Etheostoma marmorpinnum)
- Duskytail darter (Etheostoma percnurum)
- Rio Salado darter (Etheostoma segrex)
- Conasauga logperch (Percina jenkinsi)
- Asprete (Romanichthys valsanicola)
- Vardar streber (Zingel balcanicus)

==== Gobies ====
- Futuna's emperor (Akihito futuna)
- Elizabeth Springs goby (Chlamydogobius micropterus)
- Edgbaston goby (Chlamydogobius squamigenus)
- Fin-joined goby (Gobulus birdsongi)
- Danube delta dwarf goby (Knipowitschia cameliae) (possibly extinct)
- Ephesus dwarf goby (Knipowitschia ephesi)
- Acheron spring goby (Knipowitschia milleri)
- Knipowitschia mrakovcici
- Dwarf pygmy goby (Pandaka pygmaea)
- Chornaya tubenose goby (Proterorhinus tataricus)
- Stiphodon discotorquatus (possibly extinct)
- Stiphodon rubromaculatus
- Poso bungu (Weberogobius amadi)

==== Other Perciformes ====
Species

- Galapagos damsel (Azurina eupalama) (possibly extinct)
- Chinese bahaba (Bahaba taipingensis)
- Betta miniopinna
- Betta persephone
- Krabi mouth-brooding betta (Betta simplex)
- Betta spilotogena
- Callionymus sanctaehelenae
- Dageraad (Chrysoblephus cristiceps)
- Siamese tigerfish (Datnioides pulcher)
- Spring pygmy sunfish (Elassoma alabamae)
- Calico grouper (Epinephelus drummondhayi)
- Atlantic goliath grouper (Epinephelus itajara)
- Warsaw grouper (Hyporthodus nigritus)
- Murray cod (Maccullochella peelii)
- Black mogurnda (Mogurnda furva)
- Variegated mogurnda (Mogurnda variegata)
- Paraclinus walkeri
- Percichthys melanops
- Seventy-four seabream (Polysteganus undulosus)
- Trichonis blenny (Salaria economidisi)
- Sciaena callaensis (possibly extinct)
- Giant sea bass (Stereolepis gigas)
- Southern bluefin tuna (Thunnus maccoyii)
- Vardar streber (Zingel balcanicus)

Subpopulations

- Atlantic wreckfish (Polyprion americanus) (1 subpopulation)

=== Characiformes ===
- Naked characin (Gymnocharacinus bergii)
- Knodus shinahota
- Sierra Leone dwarf characin (Ladigesia roloffi)
- Red pencil (Nannostomus mortenthaleri)
- Banded neolebias (Neolebias lozii)
- Neolebias powelli

=== Other ray-finned fish species ===
- Duck-billed buntingi (Adrianichthys kruyti)
- Cuban gar (Atractosteus tristoechus)
- Killarney shad (Alosa killarnensis)
- European eel (Anguilla anguilla)
- Red handfish (Thymichthys politus)
- Spotted handfish (Brachionichthys hirsutus)
- Abrau sprat (Clupeonella abrau)
- Roundnose grenadier (Coryphaenoides rupestris)
- Pygmy sculpin (Cottus paulus)
- Cottus petiti
- Blind cave brotula (Lucifuga simile)
- Ellinopygósteos (Pungitius hellenicus)
- Bocaccio rockfish (Sebastes paucispinus)
- Alabama cavefish (Speoplatyrhinus poulsoni)
- River pipefish (Syngnathus watermeyeri)
- Chinese puffer (Takifugu chinensis)
- Sarasins minnow (Oryzias sarasinorum)

== Other fishes ==
- Eightgill hagfish (Eptatretus octatrema)
- Chapala lamprey (Lampetra spadicea)
- West Indian Ocean coelacanth (Latimeria chalumnae)

== See also ==
- Lists of IUCN Red List critically endangered species
- List of least concern fishes
- List of near threatened fishes
- List of vulnerable fishes
- List of endangered fishes
- List of recently extinct fishes
- List of data deficient fishes
- Sustainable seafood advisory lists and certification
