= Sarotherodon knauerae =

Scientific classification
- Kingdom: Animalia
- Phylum: Chordata
- Class: Actinopterygii
- Order: Cichliformes
- Family: Cichlidae
- Genus: Sarotherodon
- Species: S. knauerae

Binomial name
- Sarotherodon knauerae D. Neumann, Stiassny & Schliewen, 2011

Species of fish

Sarotherodon knauerae is a species of cichlid endemic to Lake Ejagham in western Cameroon. This species can reach a length of 7.5 centimetres (3.0 in) SL and feeds on detritus. It has not yet been rated by the IUCN, but it likely faces the same risks as the critically endangered Coptodon deckerti, which is threatened by pollution and sedimentation from human activities, a catfish from the genus Parauchenoglanis that has been introduced to the lake, and potentially also by large emissions of carbon dioxide (CO_{2}) from the lake's bottom (compare Lake Nyos), although Ejagham is not deep enough to contain very high amounts of this gas.

The specific name honours a former technician at the Max Planck Institute in Seewiesen in Germany, Barbara Knauer, who supported Ulrich K. Schliewen as both a friend and technician while he was studying for his Ph.D.
