= Sarotherodon lamprechti =

Scientific classification
- Kingdom: Animalia
- Phylum: Chordata
- Class: Actinopterygii
- Order: Cichliformes
- Family: Cichlidae
- Genus: Sarotherodon
- Species: S. lamprechti

Binomial name
- Sarotherodon lamprechti D. Neumann, Stiassny & Schliewen, 2011

Species of fish

Sarotherodon lamprechti is a species of cichlid endemic to Lake Ejagham in western Cameroon. This phytoplanktivore can reach a length of 9.9 centimetres (3.9 in) SL. It has not yet been rated by the IUCN, but it likely faces the same risks as the critically endangered Coptodon deckerti, which is threatened by pollution and sedimentation from human activities, a catfish from the genus Parauchenoglanis that has been introduced to the lake, and potentially also by large emissions of carbon dioxide (CO_{2}) from the lake's bottom (compare Lake Nyos), although Ejagham is too shallow to contain very high amounts of this gas.

The specific name honours Jürg Lamprecht (1941–2000) who worked at the Max Planck Institute in Seewiesen in Germany where he worked on a Ph.D. on haplotilapiine cichlids and supported Ulrich K. Schliewen as a mentor and Dirk Neumann as a teacher.
