= Coptodon fusiforme =

Conservation status
- Critically Endangered (IUCN 3.1)

Scientific classification
- Kingdom: Animalia
- Phylum: Chordata
- Class: Actinopterygii
- Order: Cichliformes
- Family: Cichlidae
- Genus: Coptodon
- Species: C. fusiforme

Binomial name
- Coptodon fusiforme (Dunz & Schliewen, 2010)

Synonyms
- Tilapia fusiforme Dunz & Schliewen, 2010

Species of fish

Coptodon fusiforme is a species of fish in the cichlid family, endemic to Lake Ejagham in western Cameroon. It was only scientifically described in 2010. It was rated critically endangered by the IUCN in 2023, and it faces the same risks as C. deckerti, which is threatened by pollution and sedimentation from human activities, a catfish from the genus Parauchenoglanis that has been introduced to the lake, and potentially also by large emissions of carbon dioxide (CO_{2}) from the lake's bottom (compare Lake Nyos), although Ejagham is too shallow to contain very high amounts of this gas.

It reaches up to 8 cm (3 in) in length, and mainly feeds on plankton in open water, but also takes small particles from the bottom and the water's surface.
