= Coptodon ejagham =

Conservation status
- Critically Endangered (IUCN 3.1)

Scientific classification
- Kingdom: Animalia
- Phylum: Chordata
- Class: Actinopterygii
- Order: Cichliformes
- Family: Cichlidae
- Genus: Coptodon
- Species: C. ejagham

Binomial name
- Coptodon ejagham (Dunz & Schliewen, 2010)

Synonyms
- Tilapia ejagham Dunz & Schliewen, 2010

Species of fish

Coptodon ejagham is a species of fish in the cichlid family. It is endemic to Lake Ejagham in western Cameroon. It was only scientifically described in 2010. It was rated critically endangered by the IUCN, and it faces the same risks as C. deckerti, which is threatened by pollution and sedimentation from human activities, a catfish from the genus Parauchenoglanis that has been introduced to the lake, and potentially also by large emissions of carbon dioxide (CO_{2}) from the lake's bottom (compare Lake Nyos), although Ejagham is too shallow to contain very high amounts of this gas.

At up to about 20 cm (8 in) in standard length, it is the largest cichlids in Lake Ejagham. It feeds on small fish, especially juvenile cichlids.
