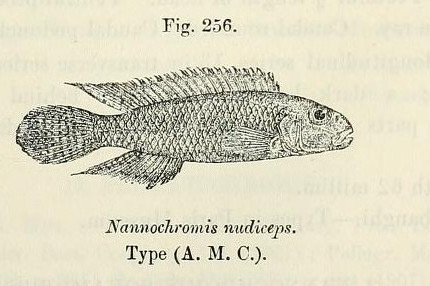
- Nanochromis nudiceps

Scientific classification
- Kingdom: Animalia
- Phylum: Chordata
- Class: Actinopterygii
- Order: Cichliformes
- Family: Cichlidae
- Tribe: Chromidotilapiini
- Genus: Nanochromis; Pellegrin, 1904

Type species
- Pseudoplesiops nudiceps Boulenger, 1899

= Nanochromis =

Genus of fishes

Nanochromis is a genus of small cichlids endemic to the Congo River Basin in Central Africa.

== Species ==
The genus Congochromis was split from Nanochromis in 2007. The following species remain in Nanochromis:

- Nanochromis consortus T. R. Roberts & D. J. Stewart, 1976
- Nanochromis minor T. R. Roberts & D. J. Stewart, 1976
- Nanochromis nudiceps (Boulenger, 1899)
- Nanochromis parilus T. R. Roberts & D. J. Stewart, 1976
- Nanochromis splendens T. R. Roberts & D. J. Stewart, 1976
- Nanochromis teugelsi Lamboj & Schelly, 2006
- Nanochromis transvestitus T. R. Roberts & D. J. Stewart, 1984
- Nanochromis wickleri Schliewen & Stiassny, 2006

In addition, a couple of undescribed species are known.
