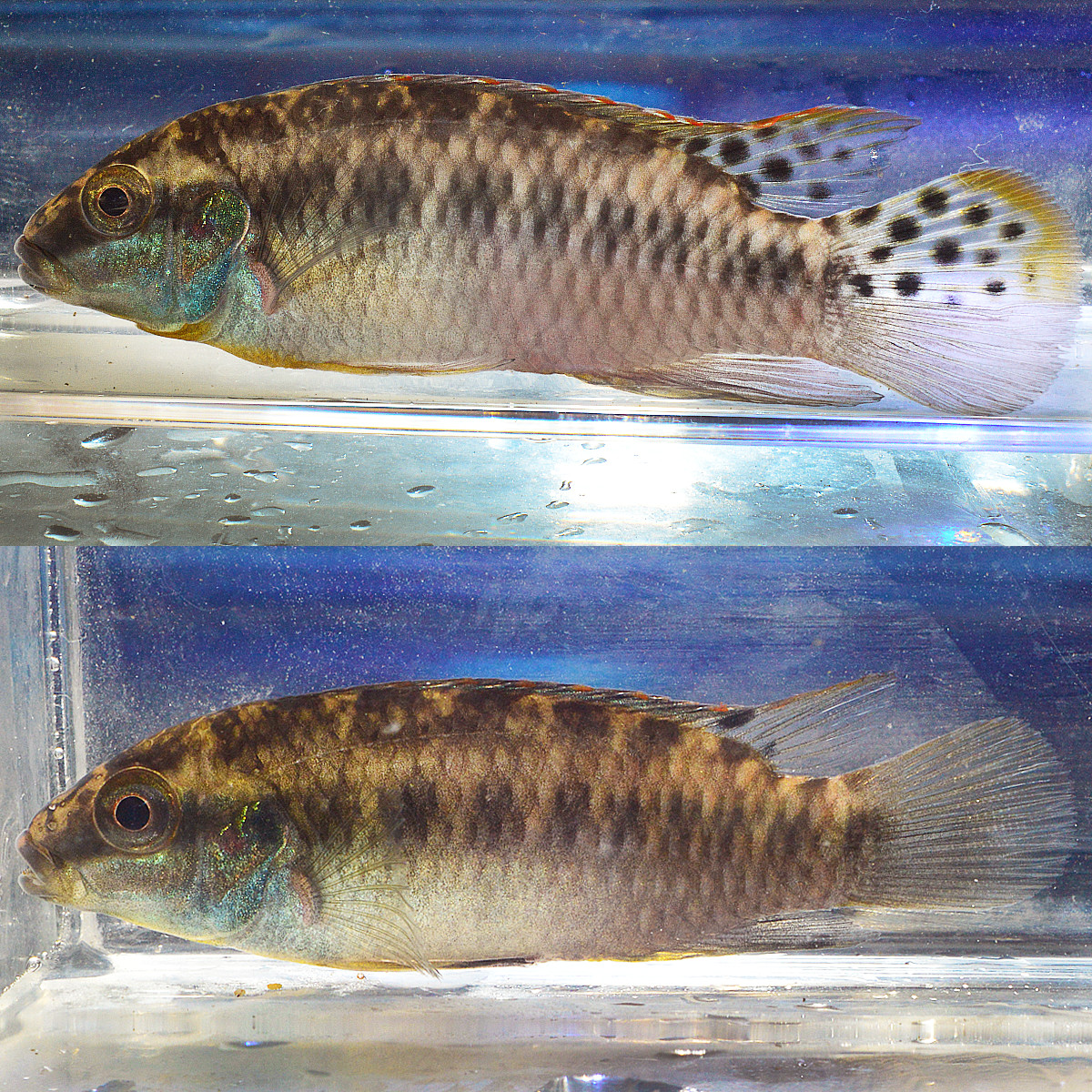

Scientific classification
- Kingdom: Animalia
- Phylum: Chordata
- Class: Actinopterygii
- Division: Teleostei
- Order: Cichliformes
- Family: Cichlidae
- Subfamily: Pseudocrenilabrinae
- Tribe: Chromidotilapiini
- Genus: Enigmatochromis
- Species: E. lucanusi

Binomial name
- Enigmatochromis lucanusi Lamboj, 2009

= Enigmatochromis =

Species of fish

Enigmatochromis lucanusi is a species of cichlid known only from the Foto River, an affluent of The Konkouré River near Fria, Guinea.

This species grows to a length of 4.5 centimetres (1.8 in) SL. This species is the only known member of its genus. The specific name honours the friend of the author, Oliver Lucanus, a collector and aquarist who supplied Lamboj with information on where to look for this species.

== Taxonomy ==
The etymology of the genus can be divided into two sections. The first component, Enigmato refers to the word Enigma and chromis (ˈkrō-məs) is a Greek term meaning "fish". This namesake of enigma comes from the species’ similarities to the compositional coloration in many members of the genus Pelvicachromis while sharing a similar external body morphology to that of the genus Parananochromis. It would later be ruled out of Pelivicharomis because E. lucanusi only possesses 12 scales on the caudal peduncle while Pelvicachromids possess 16. It was distinguished from Parananochromis by its infraorbital section (area under the eye) which possessed one less orbital bone than that of many species in Parananochromis.

== Initial Importation in The Ornamental Fish Trade ==
Upon its arrive through the aquarium fish trade in 2004 to USA, Canada, and Europe, many assumed this species to be of the genus Pelvicachromis because of its similarities in coloration to that of Pelvichachromis rollofi and females of Enigmatochromis will present a red abdomen which all females of Pelvicachromis possess during times of defense or spawning. Many aquarists could see a difference in speciation to what was present in taxonomic literature at that time. This would result in the open-nomenclature title of Pelvichachromis sp. “Blue Fin”. The temporary title was given by aquarium fish importer, Oliver Lucanus who chose this title based on the fact, “…we could see the fish from the shore with a bright blue fin” when initially collecting them in Guinea. Pelvichachromis sp. “Blue Fin” would become officially erected as Enigmatochromis lucanusi by Lamboj in 2009.

== Sexual Dimorphism ==
Determining gender in adult specimens is noticeable by several differences in sexual dichromatism. One of the most discernible ways to determine gender in adult specimens is the crimson red that can be seen on the abdomen of territorial females. This characteristic of dimorphism with similar body morphology of Pelvicachromis, would cause confusion of initial ornamental fish importers in 2004. Males have a yellow dorsum while females possess a brightly colored iridescent blue dorsum, though they both share red margins towards the top of the dorsal fin. Multiple black dots are prominent on the dorsal and caudal fins of male specimens though the number of these dots are subject to variability. Females will have at most, two dots located on the dorsal fin and will have a completely translucent caudal fin. Males are also noticeably larger than their female counterparts when sexually mature.
