= Lake Ejagham =

- Location within Cameroon Location within Africa
- Coordinates: 5°45′N 8°59′E
- Type: Solution basin
- Primary outflows: Munaya River (part of the Cross River system)
- Basin countries: Cameroon
- Max. length: Approximately 1,050 metres (3,440 ft)
- Max. width: Approximately 700 metres (2,300 ft)
- Surface area: 0.49 square kilometres (0.19 mi^{2})
- Max. depth: Approximately 18 metres (59 ft)

Lake Ejagham is a small lake near Eyumodjock in the Southwest Region of Cameroon. Unlike many other lakes in the region, it is not a volcanic lake, but is likely a solution basin formed by groundwater during the last Ice Age. This highly isolated lake is roughly oval in shape, lacks an inflow, but has an outflow into the Munaya River (part of the Cross River system). The outflow is impassable to most fishes because of a waterfall.

== Biology ==
Despite its very small size, it supports 7 endemic species of coptodonine and oreochromine cichlid fishes (Coptodon deckerti, C. ejagham, C. fusiforme, C. nigrans, Sarotherodon lamprechti, and S. knauerae). Of these, 6 were only scientifically described in 2010 and 2011, and have therefore not been rated by the IUCN, but they likely face the same threats as C. deckerti (the single older species that has been rated by the IUCN). C. deckerti is considered critically endangered due to pollution and sedimentation from human activities. It could also be threatened by large emissions of carbon dioxide (CO_{2}) from the lake's bottom (compare Lake Nyos), although Ejagham is too shallow to contain very high amounts of this gas. A species of catfish from the genus Parauchenoglanis has been introduced to the lake, and this probably presents a serious threat to the endemic cichlids.

The Ejagham cichlids are commonly considered a prime example of sympatric speciation within its two genera. Studies indicate a level of secondary gene flow between the lake's species and relatives from nearby regions, and this likely facilitated the speciation (i.e., the Ejagham species not strictly the result of sympatric speciation).

== See also ==
- Lake Barombi Koto
- Lake Barombi Mbo
- Lake Bermin
- Lake Dissoni
- Lake Oku
