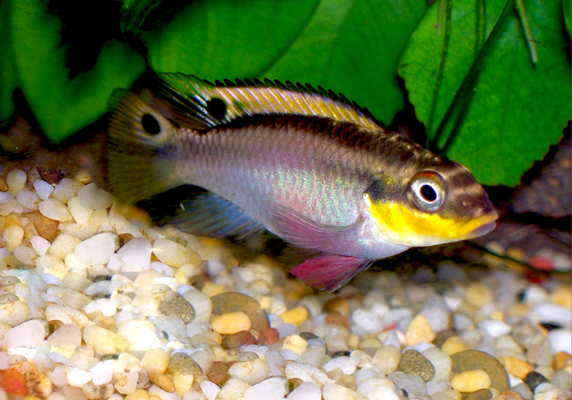
- Pelvicachromis taeniatus

Scientific classification
- Domain: Eukaryota
- Kingdom: Animalia
- Phylum: Chordata
- Class: Actinopterygii
- Order: Cichliformes
- Family: Cichlidae
- Subfamily: Pseudocrenilabrinae
- Tribe: Chromidotilapiini; Greenwood, 1987

Type genus
- Chromidotilapia Boulenger, 1898

= Chromidotilapiini =

Tribe of fishes

Chromidotilapiini is a tribe of small cichlids from tropical West and Middle Africa. There are thirteen genera and over fifty described species in this tribe.

== Genera ==
The following genera are classified within the tribe Chromidotilapiini:

- Benitochromis Lamboj, 2001
- Chromidotilapia Boulenger, 1898
- Congochromis Stiassny & Schliewen, 2007
- Divandu Lamboj & Snoeks, 2000
- Enigmatochromis Lamboj 2009
- Limbochromis Greenwood, 1987
- Nanochromis Pellegrin, 1904
- Parananochromis Greenwood, 1987
- Pelmatochromis Steindachner, 1894
- Pelvicachromis Thys van den Audenaerde, 1968
- Teleogramma Boulenger, 1899
- Thysochromis Daget 1988
- Wallaceochromis Lamboj, Trummer & Metscher 2016

The genus Pelmatochromis is sometimes placed in its own clade, informally referred to as the pelmatochromines, and this as the Pelmatochromini, may be the sister taxon to the Chromidotilapiini.
