= Teleogramma obamaorum =

Scientific classification
- Kingdom: Animalia
- Phylum: Chordata
- Class: Actinopterygii
- Order: Cichliformes
- Family: Cichlidae
- Genus: Teleogramma
- Species: T. obamaorum

Binomial name
- Teleogramma obamaorum Stiassny & S. E. Alter, 2015

Species of fish

Teleogramma obamaorum is a species of African cichlid native to the Congo River. Unlike other species of Teleogramma, sexes lack color differences in the caudal (tail) fin. Individuals reach up to 75 mm (3.0 in) SL, and prey mainly on snails.

== Etymology ==
Teleogramma obamaorum was described in 2015 and named in honor of U.S. president Barack Obama and first lady Michelle Obama in recognition of their commitments to science conservation, and development in Africa and abroad.

== See also ==
- List of things named after Barack Obama
- List of organisms named after famous people (born 1950–1974)
