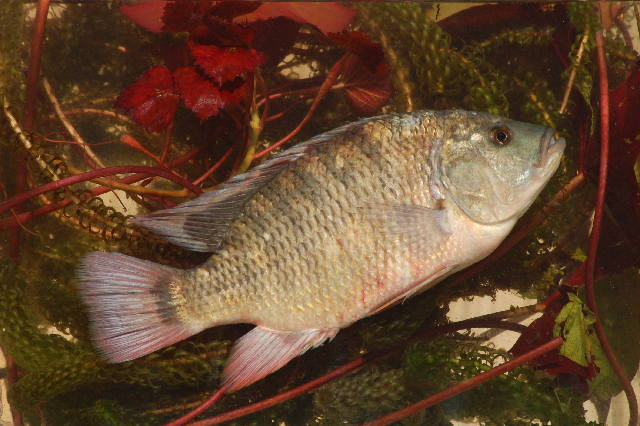
- Redbreast tilapia (C. rendalli)

Scientific classification
- Kingdom: Animalia
- Phylum: Chordata
- Class: Actinopterygii
- Order: Cichliformes
- Family: Cichlidae
- Subfamily: Pseudocrenilabrinae
- Tribe: Coptodonini; Dunz & Schliewen, 2013
- Genus: Coptodon; Gervais, 1848

Type species
- Acerina zillii Gervais, 1848

= Coptodon =

Genus of cichlids

Coptodon is a genus of cichlids native to fresh, brackish and coastal marine waters in Africa with C. zillii also found in the Middle East. It is the only genus in the tribe Coptodonini. Formerly included in Tilapia, this genus and tribe was separated in 2013. Despite the change in genus, Coptodon spp. are still referred to by the common name tilapia. Several species are important in local fisheries and a few are aquacultured.

== Appearance ==
Depending on the exact species, the maximum length of Coptodon ranges from 5 to 45 cm (2–18 in); the smallest is C. snyderae, which also is the smallest tilapia. Although the individual species typically have different nonbreeding and breeding colors, the sexes are alike. Some of the species are very similar and difficult to distinguish from each other.

== Behavior ==
Unlike the well-known oreochromine tilapia that are mouthbrooders, Coptodon spp. are substrate brooders. In most species, the parents excavate a "nest" in the bottom, ranging from a depression to actual tunnels, but a few species use surfaces of stones or sunken wood. The eggs are laid in the nest, and the eggs and fry are guarded by both parents.

Coptodon spp. mostly feed on plant material (both phytoplankton and higher plants) and detritus with smaller quantities of invertebrates, but in Lake Bermin and Lake Ejagham, a level of segregation has occurred among the species, including specialists that mostly feed on sponges (C. gutturosa and C. spongotroktis), small fish (C. ejagham), or zooplankton (C. fusiforme).

== Conservation status ==
C. rendalli and C. zillii have been introduced widely outside their native ranges, and are considered invasive, but most remaining members of the genus (including four endemics in Lake Ejagham and nine in Lake Bermin) have small ranges, and many species are seriously threatened. Considered data deficient by the IUCN, the virtually unknown C. ismailiaensis may be synonym of the equally poorly known Oreochromis ismailiaensis, or the widespread and common C. zillii. Regardless, the only known habitat of C. ismailiaensis (and Oreochromis ismailiaensis) in Egypt appears to have disappeared entirely.

== Species ==
Currently, 31 species are recognized in this genus:

- Coptodon bakossiorum (Stiassny, Schliewen & Dominey, 1992)
- Coptodon bemini (Thys van den Audenaerde, 1972)
- Coptodon bythobates (Stiassny, Schliewen & Dominey, 1992)
- Coptodon cameronensis (Holly, 1927)
- Coptodon camerunensis (Lönnberg, 1903)
- Coptodon coffea (Thys van den Audenaerde, 1970)
- Coptodon congica (Poll & Thys van den Audenaerde, 1960)
- Coptodon dageti (Thys van den Audenaerde, 1971)
- Coptodon deckerti (Thys van den Audenaerde, 1967)
- Coptodon discolor (Günther, 1903)
- Coptodon ejagham (Dunz & Schliewen, 2010)
- Coptodon flava (Stiassny, Schliewen & Dominey, 1992)
- Coptodon fusiforme (Dunz & Schliewen, 2010)
- Coptodon guineensis (Günther, 1862) (Guinean tilapia)
- Coptodon gutturosa (Stiassny, Schliewen & Dominey, 1992)
- Coptodon imbriferna (Stiassny, Schliewen & Dominey, 1992)
- Coptodon ismailiaensis (Mekkawy, 1995)
- Coptodon konkourensis (Dunz & Schliewen, 2012)
- Coptodon kottae (Lönnberg, 1904)
- Coptodon louka (Thys van den Audenaerde, 1969)
- Coptodon margaritacea (Boulenger, 1916)
- Coptodon nigrans (Dunz & Schliewen, 2010)
- Coptodon nyongana (Thys van den Audenaerde, 1971)
- Coptodon rendalli (Boulenger, 1897) (redbreast tilapia)
- Coptodon rheophila (Daget, 1962)
- Coptodon snyderae (Stiassny, Schliewen & Dominey, 1992)
- Coptodon spongotroktis (Stiassny, Schliewen & Dominey, 1992)
- Coptodon tholloni (Sauvage, 1884)
- Coptodon thysi (Stiassny, Schliewen & Dominey, 1992)
- Coptodon walteri (Thys van den Audenaerde, 1968)
- Coptodon zillii (Gervais, 1848) (redbelly tilapia)
