= Krem Synrang Pamiang =

Cave in India

Krem Synrang Pamiang is a cave located in the Jaintia Hills district of Meghalaya state, India. It is the third longest cave of India, with 14,157 m of surveyed passage.

One of the five cave entrances is situated north of the track from Chiehruphi village, on NH 44, to Musianglamare. This wet crawl entrance passage leads to about 500 m of very awkward boulder strewn passage which is followed by one of the world's finest cave passages. This 7.63 km long meandering stream-way (Wah Lariang), is probably one of the world's longest single cave passage. The cave is very rich in formations coloured in orange, red, black, grey, blue, green and white.‘Titanic Hall’ chamber would rank as one of the most beautifully decorated chambers anywhere in the world with ‘ thousands of large cave-pearls lying scattered on the floor. The cave has five entrances with the other four being Krem Musmari, Thloolong Cherlamet, Krem Eit Hati and Krem Khlieh Trai Lum.

== Flora and Fauna ==
A critically endangered species of ray-finned fish, schistura papulifera was discovered recently in the Krem Synrang Pamiang cave. As on 2014, this cave is the only place the species is found.
