= Coptodon nigrans =

Conservation status
- Critically Endangered (IUCN 3.1)

Scientific classification
- Kingdom: Animalia
- Phylum: Chordata
- Class: Actinopterygii
- Order: Cichliformes
- Family: Cichlidae
- Genus: Coptodon
- Species: C. nigrans

Binomial name
- Coptodon nigrans (Dunz & Schliewen, 2010)

Synonyms
- Tilapia nigrans Dunz & Schliewen, 2010

Species of fish

Coptodon nigrans is a species of fish in the cichlid family. It is endemic to Lake Ejagham in western Cameroon. It was only scientifically described in 2010 and was only rated by the IUCN in 2023, and it faces the same risks as the critically endangered C. deckerti, which is threatened by pollution and sedimentation from human activities, a catfish from the genus Parauchenoglanis that has been introduced to the lake, and potentially also by large emissions of carbon dioxide (CO_{2}) from the lake's bottom (compare Lake Nyos), although Ejagham is too shallow to contain very high amounts of this gas.

It reaches up to 15.3 cm (6 in) in standard length, and closely resembles the smaller C. deckerti.
