= Nanochromis transvestitus =

Conservation status
- Endangered (IUCN 3.1)

Scientific classification
- Kingdom: Animalia
- Phylum: Chordata
- Class: Actinopterygii
- Order: Cichliformes
- Family: Cichlidae
- Genus: Nanochromis
- Species: N. transvestitus

Binomial name
- Nanochromis transvestitus D. J. Stewart & T. R. Roberts, 1984

Species of fish

Nanochromis transvestitus is a sexually dimorphic cichlid endemic to Lake Mai-Ndombe in the Democratic Republic of the Congo where they live at a depth of around 1 metre (3.3 ft). It feeds on small benthic invertebrates. This species reaches a length of 3.4 centimetres (1.3 in) SL. Unusually for cichlids, it is the female, not the male, that is the most colourful. The female has a vertical black and white banding on her anal and caudal fins, with a bright red abdomen. The male, by contrast, is grayish in colour. Like many cichlids, the male does, however, have longer anal and caudal fins. The fish are egg layers and make a nest in the substrate in which to lay their eggs. This species is particularly threatened by the practice of using mosquito netting to catch fish out of the lake as material with holes that small catches every species of fish in the lake regardless of size. The specific name is a derived from the Latin trans meaning "cross" or "over" and vestitus meaning "clothed", a reference to the reversal of the normal sexual dimorphism in that this species has drabber males and more colourful females.
