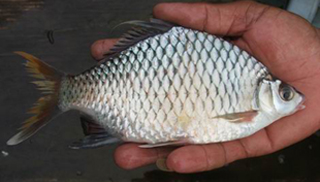

Conservation status
- Vulnerable (IUCN 3.1)

Scientific classification
- Kingdom: Animalia
- Phylum: Chordata
- Class: Actinopterygii
- Order: Cypriniformes
- Family: Cyprinidae
- Genus: Scaphognathops
- Species: S. bandanensis

Binomial name
- Scaphognathops bandanensis Boonyaratpalin & Srirungroj, 1971

Synonyms
- Scaphognathops mekongensis Taki, 1974

= Scaphognathops bandanensis =

Species of fish

Scaphognathops bandanensis, the common name, "Bandan sharp-mouth barb" is a freshwater fish in cyprinid family native to the Mekong basin in Indochina. It is characterized by small head is triangular and without barbels.

Specific name bandanensis, refers to Amphoe Bandan (now Amphoe Khong Chiam), Ubon Ratchathani Province where the type series was collected. It was studied and described by two Thai fisheries academics, Sitdhi Boonyaratpalin and Mali Srirungroj.

It can attain a maximum length of 25 cm (10 in) but generally about 15 cm (6 in) SL and feeds on small invertebrates, plants, algae including other fish scales. This species is a seasonal migratory fish along the Mekong river and its tributaries from Laos. The migration season begins in January and ends in late April to May each year, along with other species in the group of botiid loach (Botiidae) and mud carp (Henicorhynchus).

Scaphognathops bandanensis has locally commercial use as food and minor in the aquarium trade.
