= Coptodon imbriferna =

Conservation status
- Critically Endangered (IUCN 3.1)

Scientific classification
- Kingdom: Animalia
- Phylum: Chordata
- Class: Actinopterygii
- Order: Cichliformes
- Family: Cichlidae
- Genus: Coptodon
- Species: C. imbriferna

Binomial name
- Coptodon imbriferna (Stiassny, Schliewen & Dominey, 1992)

Synonyms
- Tilapia imbriferna Stiassny, Schliewen & Dominey, 1992

Species of fish

Coptodon imbriferna is a critically endangered species of fish in the cichlid family. It is endemic to Lake Bermin in Cameroon. It is threatened by pollution and sedimentation from human activities, and potentially also by large emissions of carbon dioxide (CO_{2}) from the lake's bottom (compare Lake Nyos), although Bermin is too shallow to contain very high amounts of this gas.
