= Teleogramma =

Scientific classification
- Kingdom: Animalia
- Phylum: Chordata
- Class: Actinopterygii
- Order: Cichliformes
- Family: Cichlidae
- Subfamily: Pseudocrenilabrinae
- Tribe: Chromidotilapiini
- Genus: Teleogramma; Boulenger, 1899

Type species
- Teleogramma gracile Boulenger, 1899

Genus of fishes

Teleogramma is an African genus of cichlids with five species. These dark and slender fish barely reach 10 cm (4 in) in length and are limited to rapids in the Western Congo River basin in DR Congo/Congo Brazzaville. They are distinctive, with specialized anatomy. They are characterized by elongated heads with tubular nostrils and a lateral line that is not interrupted, as it is in most cichlids.

== Species ==
There are five recognized species in this genus:

- Teleogramma brichardi Poll, 1959
- Teleogramma depressa T. R. Roberts & D. J. Stewart, 1976
- Teleogramma gracile Boulenger, 1899
- Teleogramma monogramma (Pellegrin, 1927)
- Teleogramma obamaorum Stiassny & S. E. Alter, 2015 – Obama's teleogramma.
