= Encheloclarias baculum =

Conservation status
- Least Concern (IUCN 3.1)

Scientific classification
- Kingdom: Animalia
- Phylum: Chordata
- Class: Actinopterygii
- Division: Teleostei
- Order: Siluriformes
- Family: Clariidae
- Genus: Encheloclarias
- Species: E. baculum

Binomial name
- Encheloclarias baculum P. K. L. Ng & K. K. P. Lim, 1993

Synonyms
- Encheloclarias prolatus

Species of fish

Encheloclarias baculum is a species of airbreathing catfish endemic to Malaysia where it is only found in western Sarawak on the island of Borneo. This species reaches a length of 8.6 cm (3.4 in) SL.
