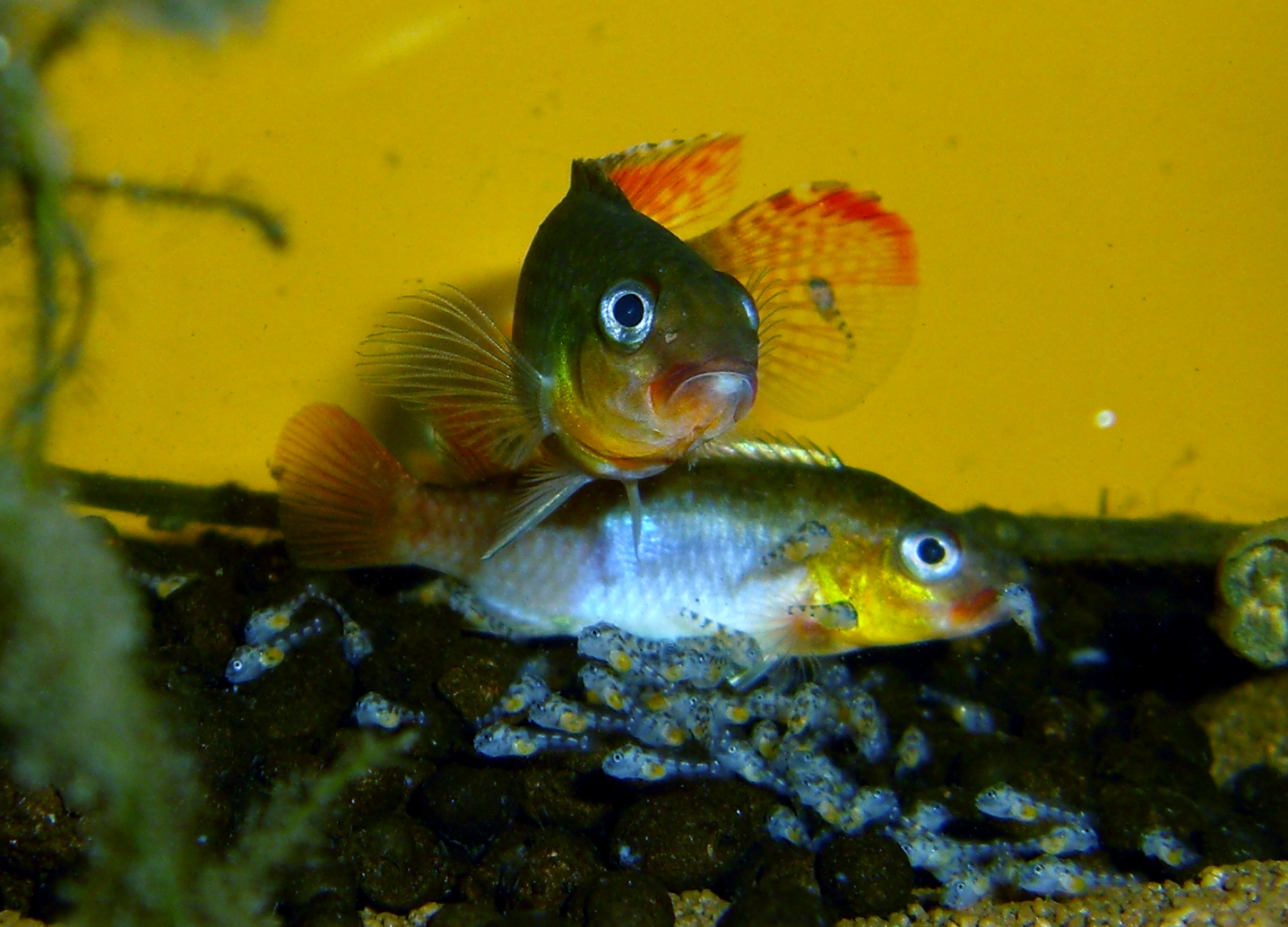
- Congochromis sabinae

Scientific classification
- Kingdom: Animalia
- Phylum: Chordata
- Class: Actinopterygii
- Order: Cichliformes
- Family: Cichlidae
- Tribe: Chromidotilapiini
- Genus: Congochromis; Stiassny & Schliewen, 2007

Type species
- Pseudoplesiops squamiceps Boulenger, 1902

= Congochromis =

Genus of fishes

Congochromis is a genus of small cichlids native to river basins in Middle Africa.

== Species ==
There are currently six recognized species in this genus:

- Congochromis dimidiatus (Pellegrin, 1900)
- Congochromis pugnatus Stiassny & Schliewen, 2007
- Congochromis robustus Lamboj, 2012
- Congochromis rotundiceps Wingi, Schedel & Schliewen, 2022
- Congochromis sabinae (Lamboj, 2005)
- Congochromis squamiceps (Boulenger, 1902)
