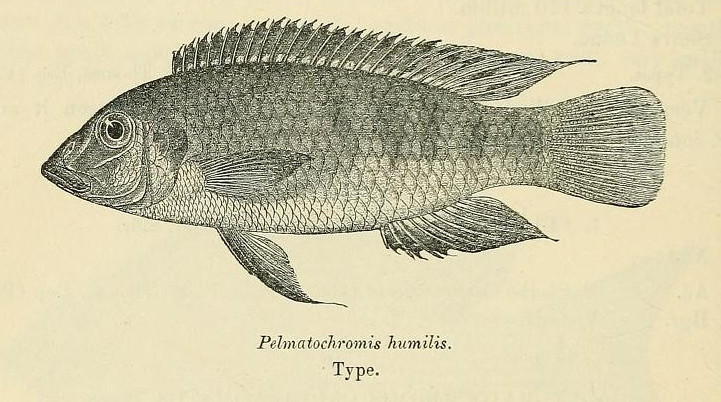

Scientific classification
- Kingdom: Animalia
- Phylum: Chordata
- Class: Actinopterygii
- Order: Cichliformes
- Family: Cichlidae
- Subfamily: Pseudocrenilabrinae
- Tribe: Chromidotilapiini
- Genus: Wallaceochromis; Lamboj, Trummer & Metscher, 2016

Type species
- Pelvicachromis humilis Boulenger, 1916

= Wallaceochromis =

Genus of fishes

Wallaceochromis is a genus of fish in the family Cichlidae and subfamily Pseudocrenilabrinae endemic to West Africa. The name of this genus honours the British naturalist and coproponent of the theory of evolution through natural selection, Alfred Russel Wallace (1823–1913).

== Species ==
There are currently 3 recognized species in this genus:

- Wallaceochromis humilis (Boulenger, 1916)
- Wallaceochromis rubrolabiatus (Lamboj, 2004)
- Wallaceochromis signatus (Lamboj, 2004)
