= Maculabatis ambigua =

Baraka's Whipray

Conservation status
- Near Threatened (IUCN 3.1)

Scientific classification
- Kingdom: Animalia
- Phylum: Chordata
- Class: Chondrichthyes
- Subclass: Elasmobranchii
- Order: Myliobatiformes
- Family: Dasyatidae
- Genus: Maculabatis
- Species: M. ambigua

Binomial name
- Maculabatis ambigua Last, Bogorodsky & Alpermann, 2016

Species of cartilaginous fish

Maculabatis ambigua, Baraka's whipray, is a species of stingray in the family Dasyatidae. It is found in the Western Indian Ocean: from the Red Sea south to Tanzania and the island of Zanzibar. This species reaches a length of 90 cm (35 in).
