= Encheloclarias =

Scientific classification
- Kingdom: Animalia
- Phylum: Chordata
- Class: Actinopterygii
- Order: Siluriformes
- Family: Clariidae
- Genus: Encheloclarias; Herre & G. S. Myers, 1937

Type species
- Heterobranchus tapeinopterus Bleeker, 1852

Genus of fishes

Encheloclarias is a genus of airbreathing catfishes endemic to Southeast Asia.

== Species ==
There are currently seven recognized species in this genus:

- Encheloclarias baculum P. K. L. Ng & K. K. P. Lim, 1993
- Encheloclarias curtisoma P. K. L. Ng & K. K. P. Lim, 1993
- Encheloclarias kelioides P. K. L. Ng & K. K. P. Lim, 1993
- Encheloclarias medialis H. H. Ng, 2012
- Encheloclarias tapeinopterus (Bleeker, 1852)
- Encheloclarias velatus H. H. Ng & H. H. Tan, 2000

Encheloclarias are often found deep within the substratum of peat swamps.

This genus differs from Heterobranchus and Dinotopterus in lacking extensions of the neural spine supporting the adipose fin.
