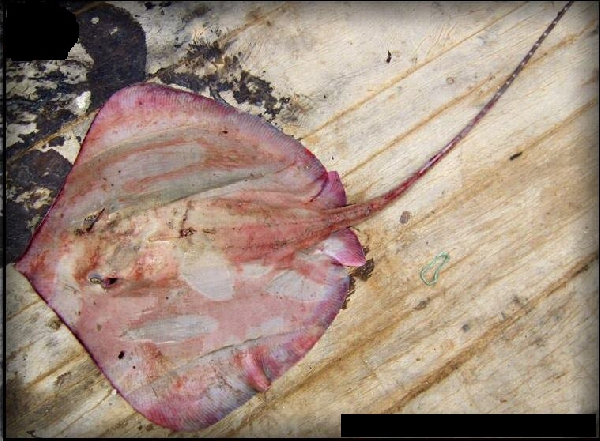
- Maculabatis randalli

Scientific classification
- Kingdom: Animalia
- Phylum: Chordata
- Class: Chondrichthyes
- Subclass: Elasmobranchii
- Order: Myliobatiformes
- Family: Dasyatidae
- Genus: Maculabatis
- Species: M. randalli

Binomial name
- Maculabatis randalli (Last, Manjaji-Matsumoto & A. B. M. Moore, 2012)

Synonyms
- Himantura randalli Last, Manjaji-Matsumoto & Moore, 2012

= Maculabatis randalli =

Arabian Banded Whipray

Species of cartilaginous fish

Maculabatis randalli, the Arabian banded whipray, is a species of stingray in the family Dasyatidae. It is native to the Persian Gulf. It reaches a length of 41.2 cm (16.2 in).

== Etymology ==
The ray is named in honor of John E. Randall (1924–2020), of the Bishop Museum in Honolulu.
