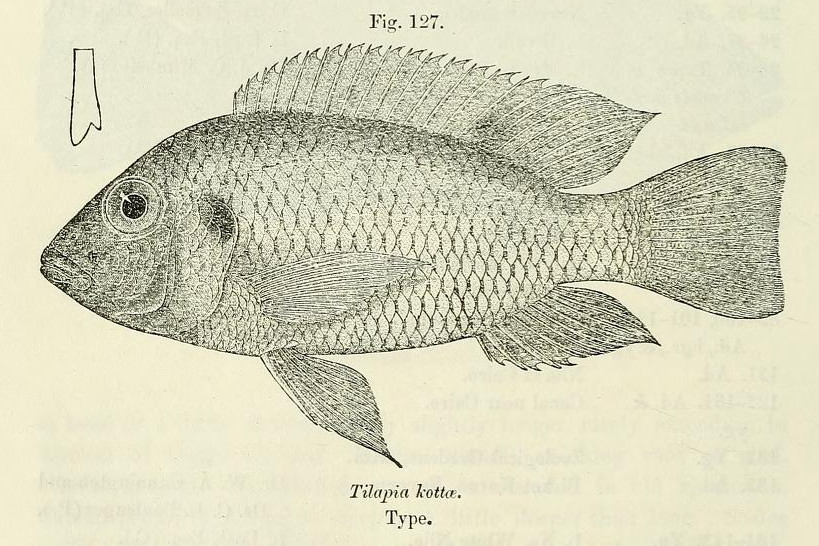
- A drawing of Coptodon kottae

Conservation status
- Endangered (IUCN 3.1)

Scientific classification
- Kingdom: Animalia
- Phylum: Chordata
- Class: Actinopterygii
- Order: Cichliformes
- Family: Cichlidae
- Genus: Coptodon
- Species: C. kottae

Binomial name
- Coptodon kottae (Lönnberg, 1904)

Synonyms
- Tilapia kottae Lönnberg, 1904

= Coptodon kottae =

Species of fish

Coptodon kottae (formerly Tilapia kottae) is an endangered species of fish in the cichlid family, Cichlidae. It is endemic to Lake Barombi-ba-Kotto and the smaller nearby Lake Mboandong in the Southwest Region of Cameroon.

This is a substrate-brooding, benthopelagic fish. Its maximum length is about 15 centimeters.

Threats to the species include sedimentation, pollution, and deoxygenation of its native lakes caused by slash-and-burn agriculture and nearby oil plantations.
