= Lake Bermin =

- Location within Cameroon Location within Africa
- Coordinates: 5°09′30″N 9°38′0″E
- Lake type: Volcanic crater lake
- Primary inflows: None
- Primary outflows: Cross River system
- Basin countries: Cameroon
- Surface area: 144 acres (58 ha) or 280 acres (110 ha)
- Max. depth: 15 m (49 ft)

Lake Bermin (sometimes spelled Bemin or Beme) is a small lake in the volcanic chain in the Southwest Region of Cameroon. It is a volcanic lake with a diameter of about 700 m (2,300 ft) and a crater rim that rises to a height of about 46 m (150 ft). This highly isolated lake is roughly circular in shape, lacks an inflow, but has an outflow into the Cross River system.

== Biology ==
Despite its very small size, it supports nine endemic species of coptodonine cichlid fishes (C. bakossiorum, C. bemini, C. bythobates, C. flava, C. gutturosa, C. imbriferna, C. snyderae, C. spongotroktis, and C. thysi). This number of endemic fishes per area is the highest recorded anywhere. Early genetic evidence suggested that these probably were the result of sympatric speciation. Later studies indicate a level of secondary gene flow between the Bermin cichlids and Cross River C. guineensis, although it is unclear if this facilitated speciation among the former group. They are a relatively recent radiation. They are quite similar in their general appearance and morphology but vary greatly in feeding behavior, including specialists like C. spongotroktis that eat pieces of the large sponges that grow in the lake. The Lake Bermin cichlids are small fish, none surpassing 14 cm (5.5 in) in standard length. At up to 5 cm (2 in) in standard length, C. snyderae is the smallest known tilapia.

All the Bermin cichlids are critically endangered by pollution and sedimentation from human activities, and potentially also by large emissions of carbon dioxide (CO_{2}) from the lake's bottom (compare Lake Nyos), although Bermin is too shallow to contain very high amounts of this gas.

== See also ==
- Lake Barombi Koto
- Lake Barombi Mbo
- Lake Dissoni
- Lake Ejagham
- Lake Oku
