= Encheloclarias tapeinopterus =

Conservation status
- Vulnerable (IUCN 3.1)

Scientific classification
- Kingdom: Animalia
- Phylum: Chordata
- Class: Actinopterygii
- Division: Teleostei
- Order: Siluriformes
- Family: Clariidae
- Genus: Encheloclarias
- Species: E. tapeinopterus

Binomial name
- Encheloclarias tapeinopterus (Bleeker, 1853)

Species of fish

Encheloclarias tapeinopterus is a species of airbreathing catfish endemic to Indonesia where it is only known from Bangka and Sumatra. This species reaches a length of 12.4 cm (4.9 in) TL.
