= Coptodon thysi =

Conservation status
- Critically Endangered (IUCN 3.1)

Scientific classification
- Kingdom: Animalia
- Phylum: Chordata
- Class: Actinopterygii
- Order: Cichliformes
- Family: Cichlidae
- Genus: Coptodon
- Species: C. thysi

Binomial name
- Coptodon thysi (Stiassny, Schliewen & Dominey, 1992)

Synonyms
- Tilapia thysi Stiassny, Schliewen & Dominey, 1992

Species of fish

Coptodon thysi is a critically endangered species of fish in the cichlid family. It is endemic to Lake Bermin in Cameroon. It is threatened by pollution and sedimentation from human activities, and potentially also by large emissions of carbon dioxide (CO_{2}) from the lake's bottom (compare Lake Nyos), although Bermin is too shallow to contain very high amounts of this gas. The specific name honours the Dutch ichthyologist Dirk Thys van den Audenaerde (b. 1934), a pioneer of the study of tilapine cichlids in Africa.
