= Coptodon snyderae =

Conservation status
- Critically Endangered (IUCN 3.1)

Scientific classification
- Kingdom: Animalia
- Phylum: Chordata
- Class: Actinopterygii
- Order: Cichliformes
- Family: Cichlidae
- Genus: Coptodon
- Species: C. snyderae

Binomial name
- Coptodon snyderae (Stiassny, Schliewen & Dominey, 1992)

Synonyms
- Tilapia snyderae Stiassny, Schliewen & Dominey, 1992

Species of fish

Coptodon snyderae is a critically endangered species of fish in the cichlid family. It is endemic to Lake Bermin in Cameroon. It is threatened by pollution and sedimentation from human activities, and potentially also by large emissions of carbon dioxide (CO_{2}) from the lake's bottom (compare Lake Nyos), although Bermin is too shallow to contain very high amounts of this gas. The specific name of this cichlid honours Alexandra Snyder (b. 1953), a museum collection manager, whose assistance in the field contributed to the success of Wallace J. Dominey's 1985 expedition to Lake Bermin, Cameroon.
