= Limbochromis =

Conservation status
- Endangered (IUCN 3.1)

Scientific classification
- Kingdom: Animalia
- Phylum: Chordata
- Class: Actinopterygii
- Order: Cichliformes
- Family: Cichlidae
- Subfamily: Pseudocrenilabrinae
- Tribe: Chromidotilapiini
- Genus: Limbochromis; Greenwood, 1987
- Species: L. robertsi

Binomial name
- Limbochromis robertsi (Thys van den Audenaerde & Loiselle, 1971)

Synonyms
- Nanochromis robertsi Thys van den Audenaerde & Loiselle, 1971

Genus of fish

Limbochromis robertsi is a species of cichlid endemic to Ghana where it is found in the upper reaches of the Pra River Basin. This species has been recorded reaching a maximum length of 10 centimetres (3.9 in) TL. It is currently the only known member of its genus. The specific name honours the American ichthyologist Tyson R. Roberts who collected the type. Deforestation driven by increased agriculture and small-scale mining operations has reduced the total population of this species by approximately 90% from the early 1990s to 2018.
