= Encheloclarias velatus =

Conservation status
- Vulnerable (IUCN 3.1)

Scientific classification
- Kingdom: Animalia
- Phylum: Chordata
- Class: Actinopterygii
- Order: Siluriformes
- Family: Clariidae
- Genus: Encheloclarias
- Species: E. velatus

Binomial name
- Encheloclarias velatus H. H. Ng & H. H. Tan, 2000

Species of fish

Encheloclarias velatus is a species of airbreathing catfish endemic to Indonesia. It is only known from the Batang Hari drainage in central Sumatra, and Bintan Island.

E. velatus differs from the other members of the genus Encheloclarias in that the anal fin and caudal fin are only confluent at the base, in meristics, and morphometrics. The dorsal surface of the head and body are uniformly very dark grey, fading to a paler colour on ventral surfaces. The adipose fin is very dark grey with a hyaline margin. The fin rays of all the other fins are dusky, with hyaline inter-radial membranes. This species reaches a length of 16.9 cm (6.7 in) SL.

The specific name velatus is from the Latin velatus meaning concealed, referring to the fact that this is the first species of Encheloclarias found on Sumatra after 150 years of ichthyological exploration, and the secretive nature of this species.
