= Coptodon discolor =

Conservation status
- Near Threatened (IUCN 3.1)

Scientific classification
- Kingdom: Animalia
- Phylum: Chordata
- Class: Actinopterygii
- Order: Cichliformes
- Family: Cichlidae
- Genus: Coptodon
- Species: C. discolor

Binomial name
- Coptodon discolor (Günther, 1903)

Synonyms
- Chromis discolor Günther, 1903; Tilapia discolor (Günther, 1903)

Species of fish

Coptodon discolor is a vulnerable species of fish in the cichlid family. It is endemic to Lake Bosumtwi, Bia River Basin, Pra River Basin and Tano River Basin in Ghana and Côte d'Ivoire. It is threatened by pollution and sedimentation from human activities. It reaches a length of 22.5 cm (8.9 in).
