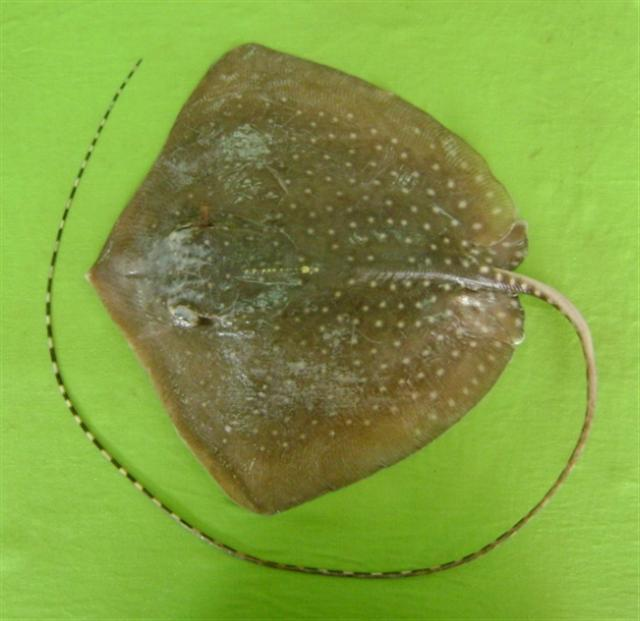
- M. gerrardi

Scientific classification
- Kingdom: Animalia
- Phylum: Chordata
- Class: Chondrichthyes
- Subclass: Elasmobranchii
- Order: Myliobatiformes
- Family: Dasyatidae
- Subfamily: Urogymninae
- Genus: Maculabatis; Last, Naylor & Manjaji-Matsumoto, 2016

Type species
- Trygon gerrardi Gray, 1851

= Maculabatis =

Genus of cartilaginous fishes

Maculabatis is a genus of stingrays in the family Dasyatidae from the Indo-Pacific. Its species were formerly contained within the genus Himantura.

== Species ==
The genus contains two groups, the "gerrardi-complex" containing spotted species and the "pastinacoides-complex" containing plain species.

- Maculabatis ambigua Last, Bogorodsky & Alpermann, 2016 (Baraka's whipray)
- Maculabatis arabica Manjaji-Matsumoto & Last, 2016 (Pakistan whipray)
- Maculabatis astra (Last, Manjaji-Matsumoto & Pogonoski, 2008) (Black-spotted whipray)
- Maculabatis bineeshi Manjaji-Matsumoto & Last, 2016 (Short-tail whipray)
- Maculabatis gerrardi (Gray, 1851) (Whitespotted whipray)
- Maculabatis macrura (Bleeker, 1852)
- Maculabatis pastinacoides (Bleeker, 1852) (Round whipray)
- Maculabatis randalli (Last, Manjaji-Matsumoto & A. B. M. Moore, 2012) (Arabian banded whipray)
- Maculabatis toshi (Whitley, 1939) (Brown whipray)
