= Enteromius melanotaenia =

Scientific classification
- Domain: Eukaryota
- Kingdom: Animalia
- Phylum: Chordata
- Class: Actinopterygii
- Order: Cypriniformes
- Family: Cyprinidae
- Subfamily: Smiliogastrinae
- Genus: Enteromius
- Species: E. melanotaenia

Binomial name
- Enteromius melanotaenia Stiassny, 1991

Synonyms
- Barbus melanotaenia Stiassny, 1991

Species of fish

Enteromius melanotaenia is a species of ray-finned fish in the genus Enteromius, it has only been recorded from its type locality the River Via in the St. Paul's river basin of Liberia.
