= Maculabatis macrura =

Whipray

Scientific classification
- Kingdom: Animalia
- Phylum: Chordata
- Class: Chondrichthyes
- Subclass: Elasmobranchii
- Order: Myliobatiformes
- Family: Dasyatidae
- Genus: Maculabatis
- Species: M. macrura

Binomial name
- Maculabatis macrura (Bleeker, 1852)

Synonyms
- Trygon macrurus Bleeker, 1852; Himantura macrura (Bleeker, 1852)

Species of cartilaginous fish

Maculabatis macrura is a species of stingray in the family Dasyatidae.
