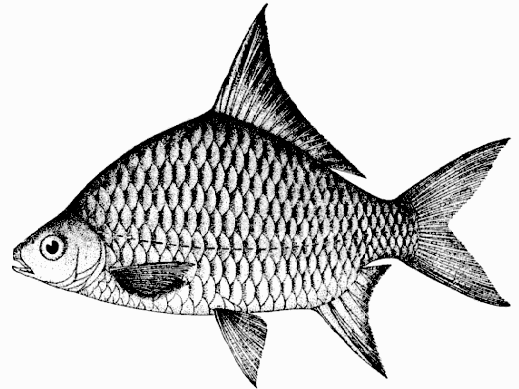

Conservation status
- Least Concern (IUCN 3.1)

Scientific classification
- Kingdom: Animalia
- Phylum: Chordata
- Class: Actinopterygii
- Order: Cypriniformes
- Family: Cyprinidae
- Genus: Scaphognathops
- Species: S. stejnegeri

Binomial name
- Scaphognathops stejnegeri (Smith, 1931)

= Scaphognathops stejnegeri =

Species of fish

Scaphognathops stejnegeri is a species of cyprinid fish of the genus Scaphognathops. It inhabits inland wetlands in Cambodia, Laos and Thailand, and is used for food locally. It has been assessed as "least concern" on the IUCN Red List.
