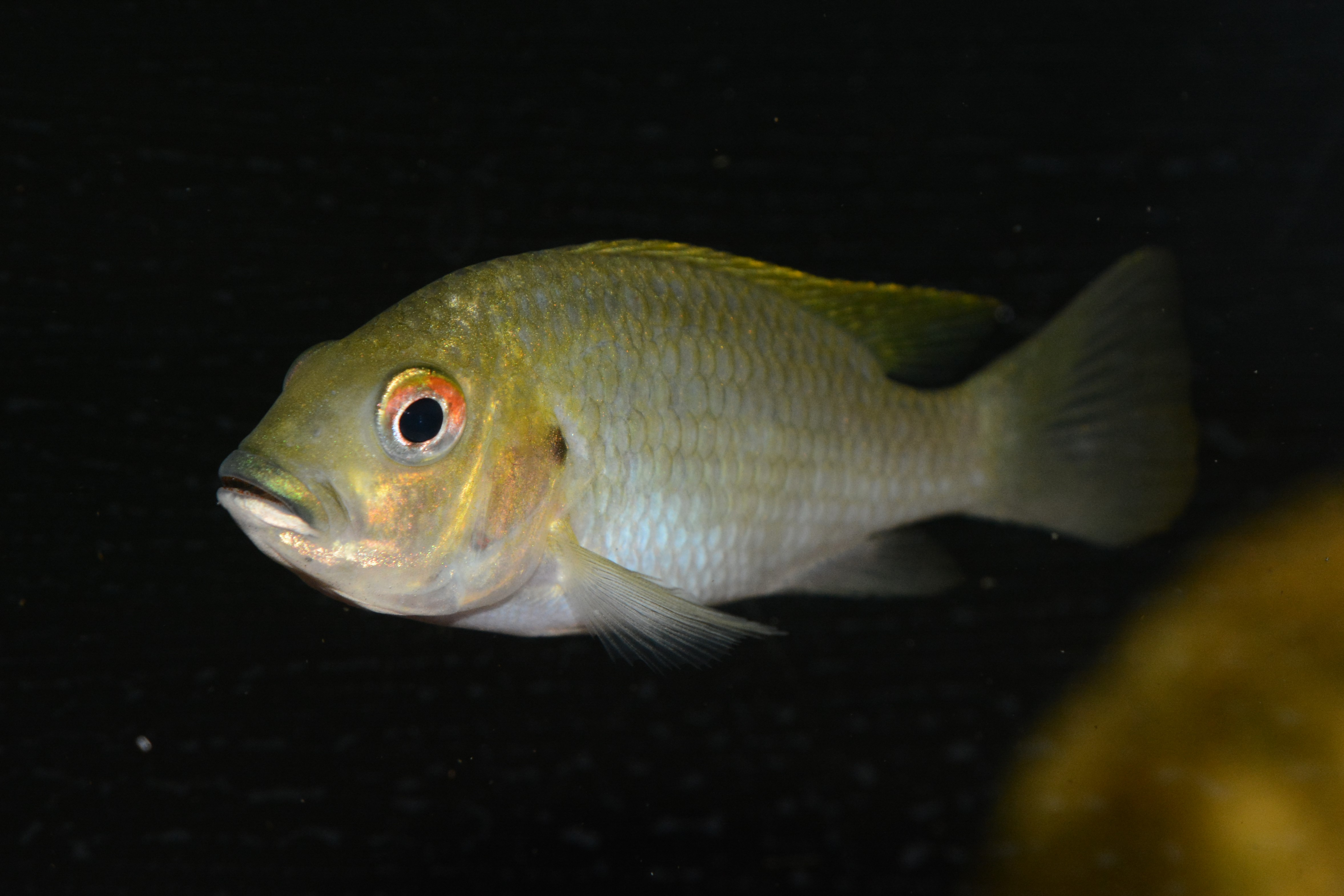

Conservation status
- Critically Endangered (IUCN 3.1)

Scientific classification
- Kingdom: Animalia
- Phylum: Chordata
- Class: Actinopterygii
- Order: Cichliformes
- Family: Cichlidae
- Genus: Coptodon
- Species: C. flava

Binomial name
- Coptodon flava (Stiassny, Schliewen & Dominey, 1992)

Synonyms
- Tilapia flava Stiassny, Schliewen & Dominey, 1992

= Coptodon flava =

Species of fish

Coptodon flava is a critically endangered species of fish in the cichlid family. It is endemic to Lake Bermin in Cameroon. It is threatened by pollution and sedimentation from human activities, and potentially also by large emissions of carbon dioxide (CO_{2}) from the lake's bottom (compare Lake Nyos), although Bermin is too shallow to contain very high amounts of this gas.
