= Round whipray =

Conservation status
- Endangered (IUCN 3.1)

Scientific classification
- Kingdom: Animalia
- Phylum: Chordata
- Class: Chondrichthyes
- Subclass: Elasmobranchii
- Order: Myliobatiformes
- Family: Dasyatidae
- Genus: Maculabatis
- Species: M. pastinacoides

Binomial name
- Maculabatis pastinacoides (Bleeker, 1852)

Synonyms
- Trygon pastinacoides Bleeker, 1852; Himantura pastinacoides (Bleeker, 1852)

Species of cartilaginous fish

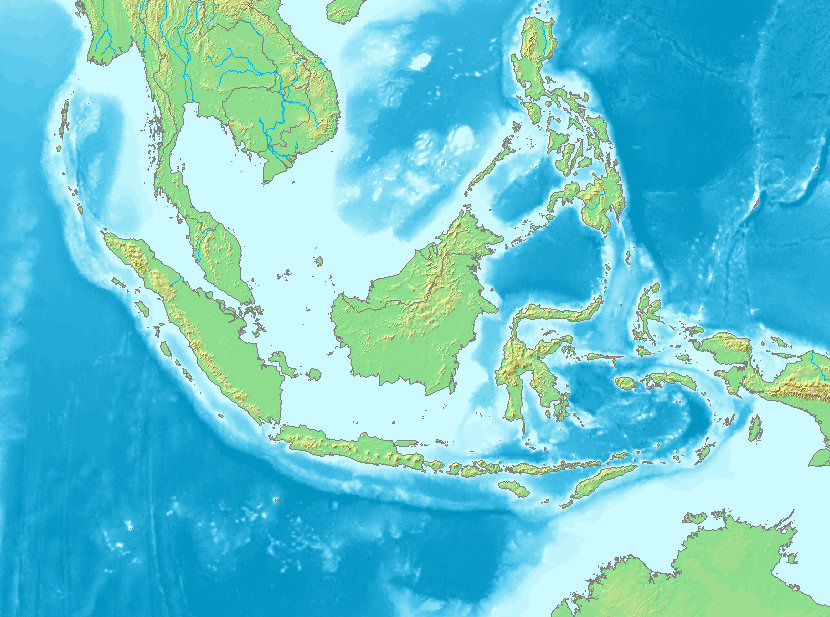
Malay Archipelago

The round whipray (Maculabatis pastinacoides) is a species of stingray within the family Dasyatidae. Populations of round whipray are primarily located in the Malay Archipelago, more specifically, parts of Brunei Darussalam, Indonesia, Malaysia, Myanmar, Singapore, and Thailand. There is also the possibility this species of stingray exists in areas of Bangladesh and Sri Lanka as well. In 2004, the round whipray was assessed by the International Union for Conservation of Nature (IUCN) Red List and determined to be a vulnerable species. The most recent assessment in 2020 has determined this species to now be endangered. While there is no data accumulated to identify the population size of round whiprays specifically, data collected regarding similar whipray species from fisheries in the Malay Archipelago area, indicate a decline in the population of round whiprays.

== Habitat ==
The round whipray prefers to live close to the floor in the Indo-Pacific Ocean. They can be found on surface waters all the way down to a maximum depth of 60 m (200 ft).

== Morphology and behavior ==
Round whiprays give birth to live young, with the size at birth of their offspring ranging from 15–16 cm (5.9–6.3 in) in disc width. Male round whiprays reach maturity once they are 43–46 cm (17–18 in) in disc width, whereas females are not considered mature until they are roughly 58 cm (23 in) in disc width. An adult round whipray can reportedly reach a maximum size of 86 cm (34 in) in disc width. Round whiprays reproduce by pairing with embrace. This species has the potential of reproducing only one pup per litter, with each generation of round whipray living for about 20 years.

== Human intervention ==
Round whiprays are bycatch in large- and small-scale fisheries. While there are no conservation efforts towards the preservation and or restoration of round whiprays, there are measures in place to limit large fisheries from over harvesting. This in turn could help round whiprays that are captured as a byproduct of fishing operations in the area have a chance to recover in their populations.
