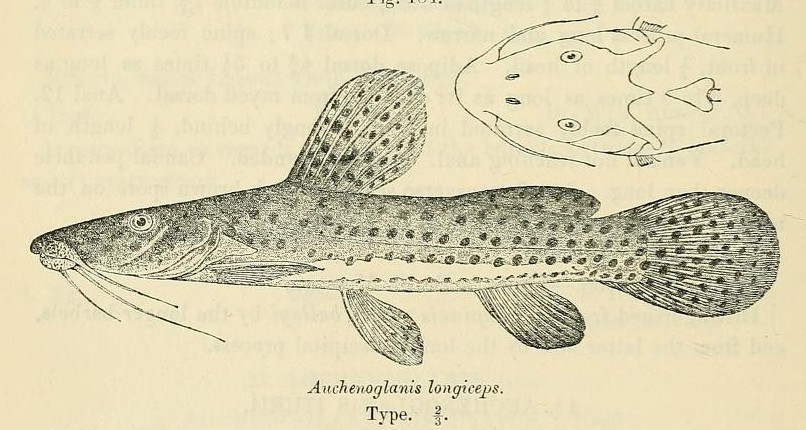

Scientific classification
- Domain: Eukaryota
- Kingdom: Animalia
- Phylum: Chordata
- Class: Actinopterygii
- Order: Siluriformes
- Family: Claroteidae
- Genus: Parauchenoglanis
- Species: P. longiceps

Binomial name
- Parauchenoglanis longiceps (Boulenger, 1913)

Synonyms
- Auchenoglanis longiceps Boulenger, 1913

= Parauchenoglanis longiceps =

Species of fish

Parauchenoglanis longiceps is a species of claroteid catfish native to Africa. It is only known from the Nyong basin in southern Cameroon.

== Size ==
This species reaches a length of 41.1 cm (16.2 in).

== Etymology ==
The fish's Latin name means long (longus) headed (-ceps), referring to the longer, narrower head compared with Parauchenoglanis balayi.
