= Divandu =

Conservation status
- Least Concern (IUCN 3.1)

Scientific classification
- Kingdom: Animalia
- Phylum: Chordata
- Class: Actinopterygii
- Order: Cichliformes
- Family: Cichlidae
- Subfamily: Pseudocrenilabrinae
- Tribe: Chromidotilapiini
- Genus: Divandu; Lamboj & Snoeks, 2000
- Species: D. albimarginatus

Binomial name
- Divandu albimarginatus Lamboj & Snoeks, 2000

Species of fish

Divandu albimarginatus is a species of cichlid native to the Republic of Congo and Gabon in Africa. This species reaches a length of 12.1 centimetres (4.8 in) SL. It is currently the only known member of its genus.
