= Lake Barombi Koto =

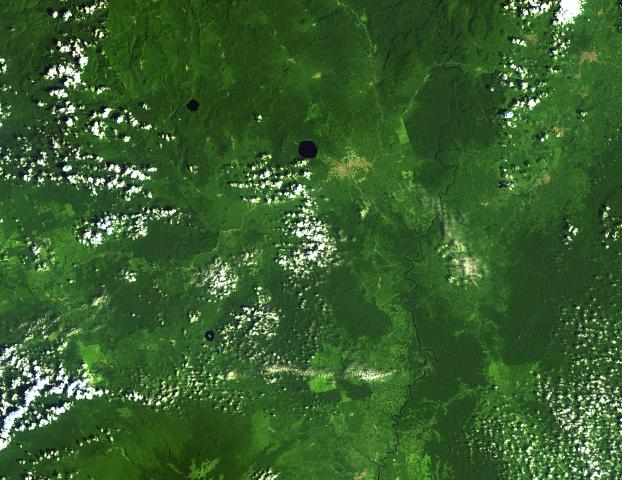
- Of the three visible lakes, Barombi Koto is the relatively small circular lake in the southwest.

- Location within Cameroon Location within Africa
- Coordinates: 4°28′N 9°16′E
- Type: Volcanic crater lake
- Primary inflows: Tung Nsuia and Tung Nsuria streams (dry out in dry season)
- Primary outflows: Nkundung-Kotto Stream (dries out or greatly reduced in dry season), which is a tributary of the Meme River
- Basin countries: Cameroon
- Max. length: 2.2 km (1.4 mi)
- Max. width: 2 km (1.2 mi)
- Surface area: 330 hectares (820 acres)
- Average depth: 3.8 m (12 ft)
- Max. depth: 6.2 m (20 ft)
- Water volume: 1,248,000 m^{3} (44,100,000 ft^{3})
- Surface elevation: 110 m (360 ft)
- Islands: Kotto (name of village on small island)

Lake Barombi Koto, also known as Lake Barombi Kotto or Lake Barombi-ba-Kotto, is a small lake in the volcanic chain in the Southwest Region of Cameroon. It is a volcanic lake with a diameter around 1.2 km (0.75 mi). A small island in the middle is densely inhabited by the Barombi, a tribe of fishers. The Tung Nsuia and Tung Nsuria streams, each about 1–2 m (3 ft 3 in – 6 ft 7 in) wide and 0.3 m (1 ft 0 in) deep near their mouths, are the only inflows into the lake, and they dry out in dry season.

== Biology ==
Lake Barombi Koto often appears green-brown because it is rich in phytoplankton. Invertebrates, turtles, and the aquatic frog Xenopus tropicalis are common in the lake, which is also an important sanctuary for birds. Seven fish species are known from the lake, including Enteromius callipterus and a Clarias catfish, while the remaining all are cichlids: Coptodon kottae, Chromidotilapia guentheri, Hemichromis fasciatus, Pelmatolapia mariae, and Sarotherodon galilaeus. Of these, C. guentheri is represented by the endemic subspecies C. g. loennbergi, while C. kottae is entirely endemic to this lake and the smaller Lake Mboandong. A review in 2008 was unable to confirm the distinction of the subspecies C. g. loennbergi compared to C. guentheri elsewhere, but the H. fasciatus in Barombi Koto and Lake Mboandong are unusually small and might be an endemic undescribed species. The endemics are threatened by pollution and sedimentation from human activities, and "turning" of the lake's water because of deforestation of the surroundings (this may allow more wind, and the lake is stratified with oxygen-poor lower levels). They are potentially also threatened by large emissions of carbon dioxide from the lake's bottom (compare Lake Nyos), although Barombi Koto is too shallow to contain very high amounts of this gas.

The nothobranchiids Aphyosemion bivittatum, Epiplatys sexfasciatus, and Fundulopanchax oeseri, the poeciliid Procatopus similis, and Barbus callipterus are found in the Tung Nsuia and Tung Nsuria streams.

Bulinus snails (including the near-endemic B. camerunensis) infested with Schistosoma, which causes the disease bilharzia in humans, are present in the lake.

== Lake Mboandong ==
About 1 km (0.6 mi) south of Lake Barombi Koto is the even smaller Lake Mboandong, another shallow crater lake with a diameter around 0.4 km (0.25 mi). No inflow is visible and the only outflow is a small stream during the wet season.

Lake Mboandong is less rich in phytoplankton and has fewer fish species, but all are species shared with Lake Barombi Koto and its inflowing streams: A. bivittatum, F. oeseri, C. kottae, H. fasciatus and S. galilaeus. Members of the Barombi tribe that live at Lake Barombi Koto sometimes visit Lake Mboandong to fish.

== See also ==
- Lake Barombi Mbo
- Lake Bermin
- Lake Dissoni
- Lake Ejagham
- Lake Oku
