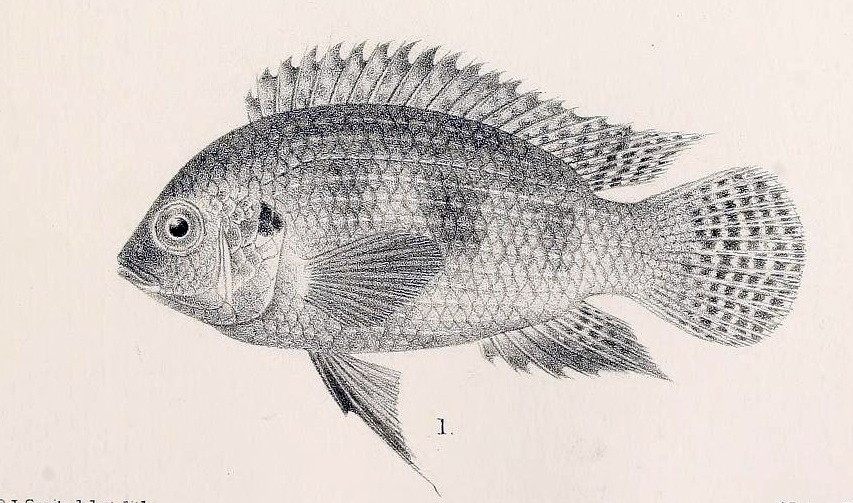

Scientific classification
- Kingdom: Animalia
- Phylum: Chordata
- Class: Actinopterygii
- Division: Teleostei
- Order: Cichliformes
- Family: Cichlidae
- Subfamily: Pseudocrenilabrinae
- Tribe: Chromidotilapiini
- Genus: Thysochromis; Daget, 1988

Type species
- Pelmatochromis ansorgii Boulenger, 1901

Synonyms
- Thysia Loiselle & Welcomme, 1972

= Thysochromis =

Genus of fishes

Thysochromis is a genus of cichlids native to West and Middle Africa.

== Species ==
There are currently two recognized species in this genus:

- Thysochromis ansorgii (Boulenger, 1901)
- Thysochromis emili Walsh, Lamboj & Stiassny, 2019

Synonyms

- Thysochromis annectens (Boulenger, 1913); valid as T. ansorgii
