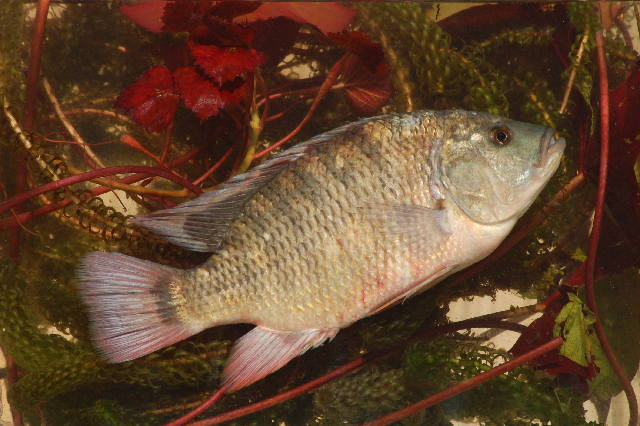

Conservation status
- Least Concern (IUCN 3.1)

Scientific classification
- Kingdom: Animalia
- Phylum: Chordata
- Class: Actinopterygii
- Order: Cichliformes
- Family: Cichlidae
- Genus: Coptodon
- Species: C. rendalli

Binomial name
- Coptodon rendalli (Boulenger, 1897)

Synonyms
- Chromis rendalli Boulenger, 1897; Tilapia rendalli (Boulenger, 1897); Tilapia sexfasciata Pellegrin, 1900; Tilapia latifrons Boulenger, 1906; Tilapia christyi Boulenger, 1915; Tilapia sykesii Gilchrist & Thompson, 1917; Tilapia kirkhami Gilchrist & Thompson, 1917; Tilapia druryi Gilchrist & Thompson, 1917; Tilapia mackeani Gilchrist & Thompson, 1917; Tilapia swierstrae Gilchrist & Thompson, 1917; Tilapia gefuensis Thys van den Audenaerde, 1964

= Redbreast tilapia =

Species of fish

The redbreast tilapia (Coptodon rendalli) is a species of fish in the family Cichlidae. It is found widely in the southern half of Africa. Its natural habitats are freshwater lakes and freshwater marshes. It is known as the redbreast kurper in South Africa.

== Distribution ==
The species is found in the drainage basins of the upper Congo River and the Kasai River, in Lake Tanganyika, Lake Malawi, Zambezi River, and the coastal regions of the Zambezi outlet to KwaZulu-Natal, as well as in the Limpopo River, the Okavango River, and the Cunene River. They have been established as edible fish in several countries.

== Description ==
C. rendalli grows to a maximum length of 45 cm and a maximum weight of 2.5 kg, and possesses a high-backed, sideways oblate body. Its body height is 42.2 to 49.4% of its standard length, and its head length is 31.1% to 37.5% of standard length. The top of its head is convex, or sometimes concave in large specimen due to the continued growth of the mouth region. Its mouth is studded with short, wide, thick, two-pointed teeth. Their lower pharyngeal jaw is as wide as it is long. Its toothed back area is longer than its front area. Seven to 10 gill raker streams are located on the lower branch of its first gill arch.

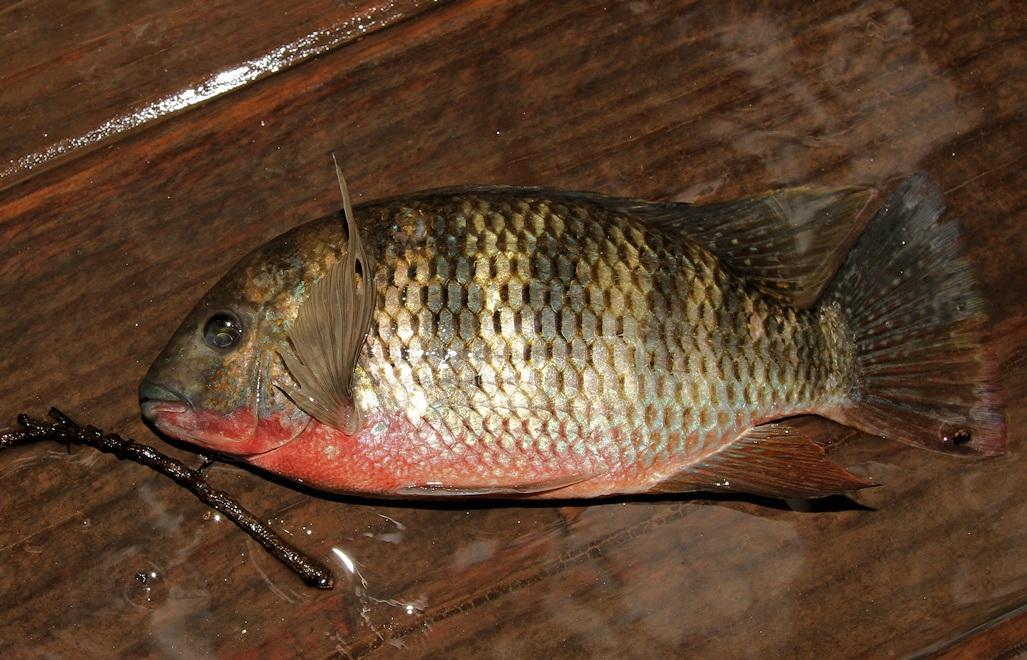
In South Africa

Its head and rump are olive-green on top and paler on the sides. Like all members of the genus Coptodon, its breast and belly are often tinted red. The flanks display a few lateral ligaments. Its olive-green dorsal fin possesses a red rim and white to grey spots on the soft streamed section.

- Fin formula: dorsal XIV–XVII/10–13, anal III/9–10
- Scale formula: SL 28–32, 3–5 rows of scales on the sides of the head
- Vertebrae: 29

== Behaviour ==
C. rendalli mainly lives near river banks, in oxbow lakes, and swamps. It prefers densely vegetated areas and still waters with small amounts of current. The species has a high temperature tolerance (8 – 41 °C) and also withstands brackish water with a salt content of up to 1.9%. The young fish live on plankton; adults, like all members of the genus Coptodon, are primarily herbivores and eat algae and taller plants, as well as insects and smaller crustaceans.

== Classification ==
The species was described in 1897 by Belgian-British ichthyologist George Albert Boulenger as Chromis rendalli, and later classified as a member of the genus Tilapia, subgenus Coptodon. The subgenus Coptodon was elevated to a genus in early 2013. The specific name honours British zoologist Percy Rendall (1861-1948), the collector of the type from the upper Shire River in British Central Africa.
