= Lake Dissoni =

Crater lake

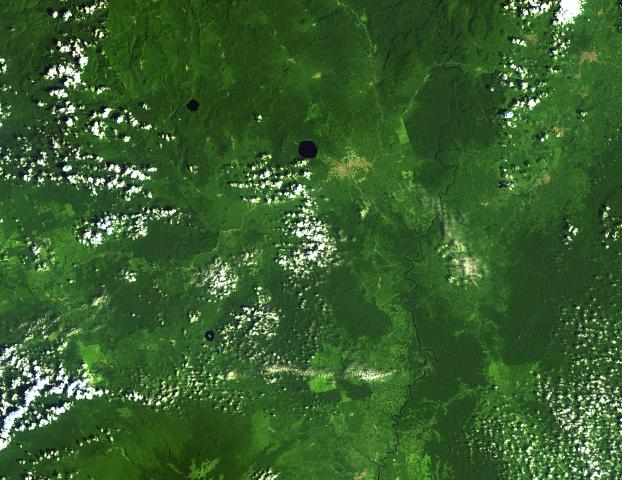
- Of the three visible lakes, Dissoni is the relatively small circular lake in the northwest.

- Location within Cameroon Location within Africa
- Coordinates: 4°44′N 9°17′E
- Type: Crater lake
- Primary outflows: Overflow into a stream that eventually enters the Meme River
- Basin countries: Cameroon
- Max. length: 1.25 km (0.78 mi)
- Surface area: 133 hectares (1.33 km^{2})
- Average depth: 53 m (174 ft)
- Max. depth: 81 m (266 ft)
- Water volume: 750,000 m^{3} (26,000,000 cu ft)
- Surface elevation: about 450 m (1,480 ft)

Lake Dissoni, also known as Lake Soden, is a small lake in the volcanic chain in the Southwest Region of Cameroon. This volcanic lake has diameter of about 1.25 km (0.78 mi) and is at the southeastern foot of the Rumpi Hills.

There are only three fish species in the lake, but all these are endemic: A poeciliid (Procatopus lacustris, though probably a synonym of the more widespread P. similis), an undescribed catfish (Clarias sp.) and an undescribed barb (Barbus sp.). The atyid shrimp Caridina sodenensis is also endemic to the lake.

== See also ==
- Lake Barombi Koto
- Lake Barombi Mbo
- Lake Bermin
- Lake Ejagham
- Lake Oku

== See also ==
- Communes of Cameroon
