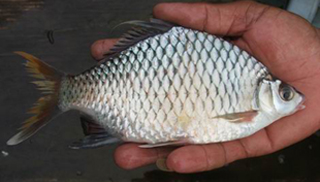
- Scaphognathops bandanensis

Scientific classification
- Kingdom: Animalia
- Phylum: Chordata
- Class: Actinopterygii
- Order: Cypriniformes
- Family: Cyprinidae
- Subfamily: Cyprininae
- Genus: Scaphognathops; H. M. Smith, 1945

Type species
- Scaphognathops stejnegeri H. M. Smith, 1931

Synonyms
- Scaphognathus H. M. Smith, 1931

= Scaphognathops =

Genus of fishes

Scaphognathops is a genus of cyprinid fishes native to Southeast Asia. In Thai, they are commonly known as pla pak pian (Thai: ปลาปากเปี่ยน), pla pian (ปลาเปี่ยน), or pla ta dam (ปลาตาดำ). The genus is restricted to the Mekong Basin and is considered uncommon.

It was named by H. M. Smith, an American ichthyologist who lived and worked in Siam (now Thailand). Smith originally intended to name the genus Scaphognatus, but the name had already been used for a group of prehistoric winged reptiles.

== Species ==
There are currently three species in this genus:

- Scaphognathops bandanensis Boonyaratpalin & Srirungroj, 1971
- Scaphognathops stejnegeri (H. M. Smith, 1931)
- Scaphognathops theunensis Kottelat, 1998
