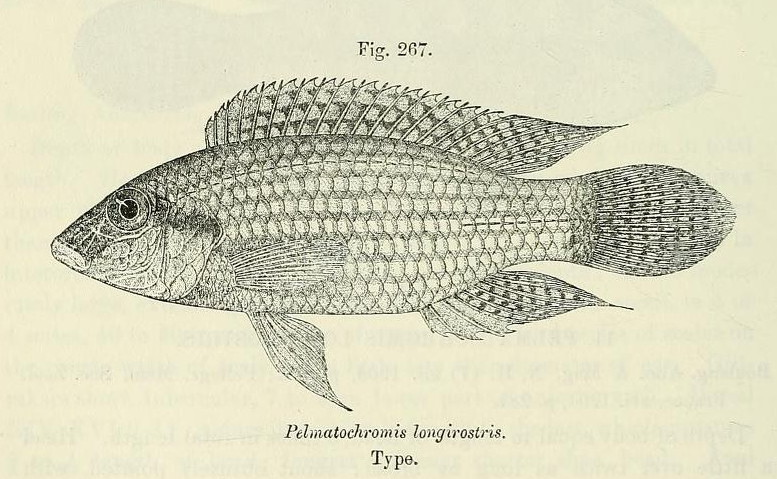
- Parananochromis longirostris

Scientific classification
- Kingdom: Animalia
- Phylum: Chordata
- Class: Actinopterygii
- Order: Cichliformes
- Family: Cichlidae
- Tribe: Chromidotilapiini
- Genus: Parananochromis; Greenwood, 1987

Type species
- Pelmatochromis longirostris Boulenger, 1903

= Parananochromis =

Genus of fishes

Parananochromis is a genus of cichlids native to tropical Africa.

== Species ==
There are currently 8 recognized species in this genus:

- Parananochromis axelrodi Lamboj & Stiassny, 2003
- Parananochromis brevirostris Lamboj & Stiassny, 2003
- Parananochromis caudifasciatus (Boulenger, 1913)
- Parananochromis elobatus Lamboj, 2014
- Parananochromis gabonicus Trewavas, 1975
- Parananochromis longirostris (Boulenger, 1903)
- Parananochromis ornatus Lamboj & Stiassny, 2003
- Parananochromis orsorum Lamboj, 2014
