= Indonesian angelshark =

Conservation status
- Critically Endangered (IUCN 3.1)

Scientific classification
- Kingdom: Animalia
- Phylum: Chordata
- Class: Chondrichthyes
- Subclass: Elasmobranchii
- Division: Selachii
- Order: Squatiniformes
- Family: Squatinidae
- Genus: Squatina
- Species: S. legnota

Binomial name
- Squatina legnota Last & W. T. White, 2008
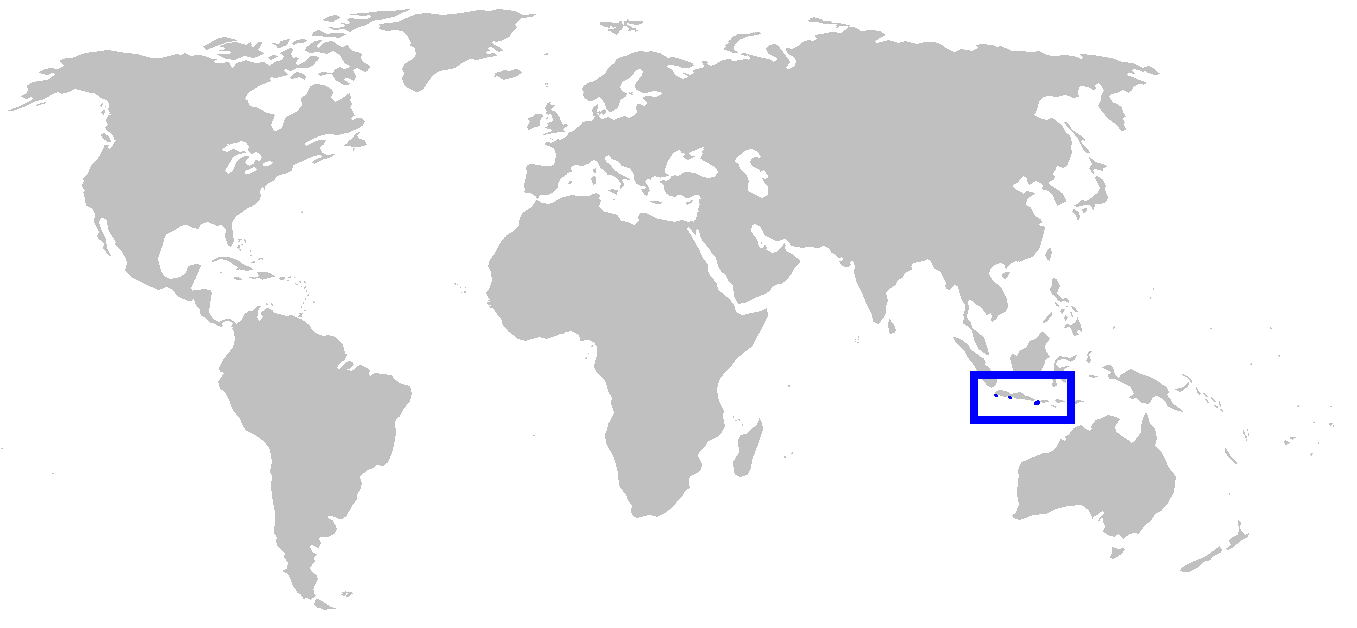
- Range of the Indonesian angelshark

Species of shark

The Indonesian angelshark (Squatina legnota) is a rare species of angelshark, family Squatinidae, known only from a few specimens collected from fish landing sites in southern Indonesia. It is thought to inhabit the deep waters of the continental slope. Reaching at least 1.34 m (4.4 ft) long, this species has a flattened, ray-like shape and a well-developed tail and caudal fin. It is characterized by the absences of fringes on its nasal barbels and thorns down the midline of its back, as well as by its relatively plain grayish-brown dorsal coloration with dark saddles beneath the dorsal fin bases and a black leading margin on the underside of the pectoral fins. The International Union for Conservation of Nature (IUCN) has classified it as Critically Endangered due to significant fishing pressure.

== Taxonomy and phylogeny ==
The Indonesian angelshark was described by Commonwealth Scientific and Industrial Research Organisation (CSIRO) researchers Peter Last and William White in a 2008 volume of the scientific journal Zootoxa, based on specimens found at several Indonesian fish landing sites. One of the specimens, a 47 cm (19 in) long female from the Cilacap landing site in central Java, was designated the holotype. The specific epithet comes from the Greek legnotos ("having a colored border"), in reference to the dark leading margins of the pectoral fins.

Björn Stelbrink and colleagues' 2010 phylogenetic analysis, based on mitochondrial DNA, found that the sister species of the Indonesian angelshark is the Taiwan angelshark (S. formosa); the two were the closest genetically of all the species examined. The pair additionally formed a clade with the Japanese angelshark (S. japonica) and the ocellated angelshark (S. tergocellatoides), both also Asian species.

== Distribution and habitat ==
The known specimens of the Indonesian angelshark have come from fish landing sites at Palabuhanratu in West Java, Cilacap in Central Java, Kedonganan in Bali, and Tanjung Luar in Lombok. Therefore, specific information on its preferred natural habitat is unavailable, though it is probably bottom-dwelling in the deeper waters of the continental slope.

== Description ==
The largest known Indonesian angelshark specimen measured 1.34 m (4.4 ft) long. As in all angel sharks, it has a flattened body with greatly enlarged pectoral and pelvic fins. The broad, flattened head has a very short, blunt snout and small, widely spaced eyes placed somewhat on top. The eyes are followed by much larger, crescent-shaped spiracles. The nostrils are large and preceded by well-developed flaps of skin that reach the mouth; each flap bears two prominent barbels, which are smooth rather than fringed. The capacious, gently curved mouth is placed at the front of the head. There are long, deep furrows extending from the mouth corners onto and away from the lower jaw. The teeth number around 18 rows in both jaws; each is small and dagger-like, with a single sharp cusp. The five pairs of gill slits are long and placed on the sides of the head.

The pectoral fins are angular, with the anterior lobes of their bases free from the head, and their outer tips forming an angle of slightly under 120°. The tips of the pelvic fins are rounded; males have thick claspers. The two dorsal fins are close in shape and size, with rounded to angular apexes and slightly convex trailing margins. The first dorsal originates over the pelvic fins rear tips, and the second dorsal is placed close to the first. There is no anal fin. The tail is rather long, with the caudal peduncle moderately flattened and expanded laterally into keels. The lower lobe of the short and triangular caudal fin is larger than the upper, and there is a notch in the upper lobe trailing margin. The dorsal surface is covered by small, roughly conical dermal denticles. This species is grayish brown above, darkening around the eyes and on the snout and becoming translucent at the trailing fin margins. There are blackish saddle markings below the dorsal fin bases, and sometimes also large, dark blotches and "eyespots" scattered over the dorsal surface. The underside is almost completely white, with a black leading margin on the pectoral fins.

== Biology and ecology ==
Little is known of the Indonesian angelshark's natural history. It is presumably aplacental viviparous like other members of its family. The smallest male specimen, an adult, measured 1.25 m (4.1 ft) long.

== Human interactions ==
The Indonesian angelshark is rarely caught incidentally on demersal longlines and marketed for meat and fins. If the presently limited Indonesian deepwater fisheries were to expand, this species may be threatened as other angel shark species have shown themselves to be particularly susceptible to fishing depletion. As of 2020, the species is classified as Critically Endangered by the IUCN.
