= Encheloclarias kelioides =

Conservation status
- Vulnerable (IUCN 3.1)

Scientific classification
- Kingdom: Animalia
- Phylum: Chordata
- Class: Actinopterygii
- Order: Siluriformes
- Family: Clariidae
- Genus: Encheloclarias
- Species: E. kelioides

Binomial name
- Encheloclarias kelioides P. K. L. Ng & K. K. P. Lim, 1993

Species of fish

Encheloclarias kelioides is a species of airbreathing catfish found in the Malay Peninsula in both Malaysia and Singapore. It is possibly present also in central Sumatra (Indonesia). It is found in both blackwater peat swamp forests and clearwater swamp forests. This species reaches a length of 6.5 cm (2.6 in) SL.
