= Maculabatis bineeshi =

Short-Tail Whipray

Scientific classification
- Kingdom: Animalia
- Phylum: Chordata
- Class: Chondrichthyes
- Subclass: Elasmobranchii
- Order: Myliobatiformes
- Family: Dasyatidae
- Genus: Maculabatis
- Species: M. bineeshi

Binomial name
- Maculabatis bineeshi Manjaji-Matsumoto & Last, 2016

Species of cartilaginous fish

Maculabatis bineeshi, the short-tail whipray, is a species of stingray in the family Dasyatidae. It is found in the Indian Ocean: around Pakistan and India, also in the Bay of Bengal. This species reaches a length of 66 cm (26 in).
