= Rhinobatos annandalei =

Conservation status
- Critically Endangered (IUCN 3.1)

Scientific classification
- Kingdom: Animalia
- Phylum: Chordata
- Class: Chondrichthyes
- Subclass: Elasmobranchii
- Order: Rhinopristiformes
- Family: Rhinobatidae
- Genus: Rhinobatos
- Species: R. annandalei

Binomial name
- Rhinobatos annandalei Norman, 1926

Synonyms
- Rhinobatus annandalei Norman, 1926 (misspelling)

Species of cartilaginous fish

Rhinobatos annandalei, or Annandale's guitarfish, is a type of ray in the family Rhinobatidae. It is found in the Indian Ocean around India, Pakistan, Sri Lanka and possibly the Persian Gulf. It is predominantly found in the marine waters, but also enters the brackish waters and freshwater rivers as well. It reaches a length of approximately 56 centimetres (22 in). Annandale's guitarfish are ovoviviparous fishes.
