= Schistura papulifera =

Conservation status
- Critically Endangered (IUCN 3.1)

Scientific classification
- Kingdom: Animalia
- Phylum: Chordata
- Class: Actinopterygii
- Order: Cypriniformes
- Family: Nemacheilidae
- Genus: Schistura
- Species: S. papulifera

Binomial name
- Schistura papulifera Kottelat, Harries & Proudlove, 2007

Species of fish

Schistura papulifera is a critically endangered species of ray-finned fish, a troblobitic stone loach, in the genus Schistura endemic to the state of Meghalaya in India. It is currently known to be restricted to the Krem Synrang Pamiang cave system near the Jaintia Hills, where it is threatened by limestone extraction. This species lives in pools of standing water within the cave system preferring these to the streams of flowing water, being most numerous in the largest and deepest pools. This may be because the larger pools offer a more stable environment for the fish. The specific name is a compound of the Latin papula meaning "a small tumour" and fera meaning "to bear", referring to the growths around the lower half this species head.
