= Scaphognathops theunensis =

Conservation status
- Critically Endangered (IUCN 3.1)

Scientific classification
- Kingdom: Animalia
- Phylum: Chordata
- Class: Actinopterygii
- Order: Cypriniformes
- Family: Cyprinidae
- Genus: Scaphognathops
- Species: S. theunensis

Binomial name
- Scaphognathops theunensis Kottelat, 1998

Species of fish

Scaphognathops theunensis is a species of freshwater ray-finned fish belonging to the family Cyprinidae, the family which includes the carps, barbs and related fishes. This species is classified by the IUCN as Critically Endangered, being endemic to the upper parts of the Nam Kading basin in Laos where it occurs in the middle and lower Nam Theun and the Nam Gnouang rivers. It needs flowing water and is threatened by the creation of reservoirs which have been created on the rivers this species is found in.
