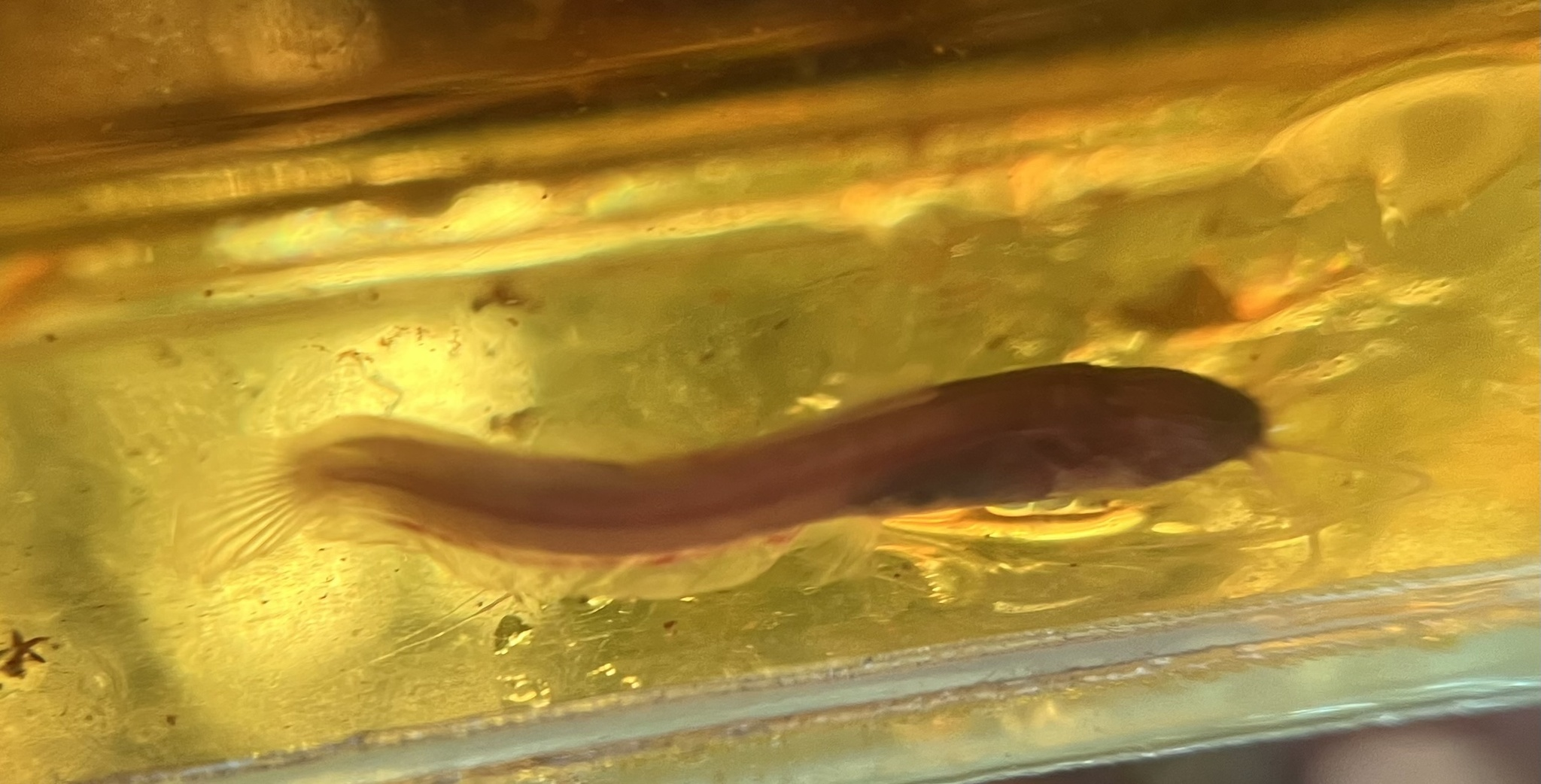
- Encheloclarias curtisoma

Conservation status
- Endangered (IUCN 3.1)

Scientific classification
- Kingdom: Animalia
- Phylum: Chordata
- Class: Actinopterygii
- Order: Siluriformes
- Family: Clariidae
- Genus: Encheloclarias
- Species: E. curtisoma

Binomial name
- Encheloclarias curtisoma P. K. L. Ng & K. K. P. Lim, 1993

= Encheloclarias curtisoma =

Species of fish

Encheloclarias curtisoma is a species of airbreathing catfish endemic to Malaysia where it is only known from Selangor. This species reaches a length of 8.2 cm (3.2 inches) SL.
