= Maculabatis arabica =

Arabic whipray

Scientific classification
- Kingdom: Animalia
- Phylum: Chordata
- Class: Chondrichthyes
- Subclass: Elasmobranchii
- Order: Myliobatiformes
- Family: Dasyatidae
- Genus: Maculabatis
- Species: M. arabica

Binomial name
- Maculabatis arabica Manjaji-Matsumoto & Last, 2016

Species of cartilaginous fish

Maculabatis arabica, the Arabic whipray, is a species of stingray in the family Dasyatidae. It is found in the Indian Ocean: around Pakistan and India, and also found in the Arabian Sea. This species reaches a length of 45 cm (18 in).
