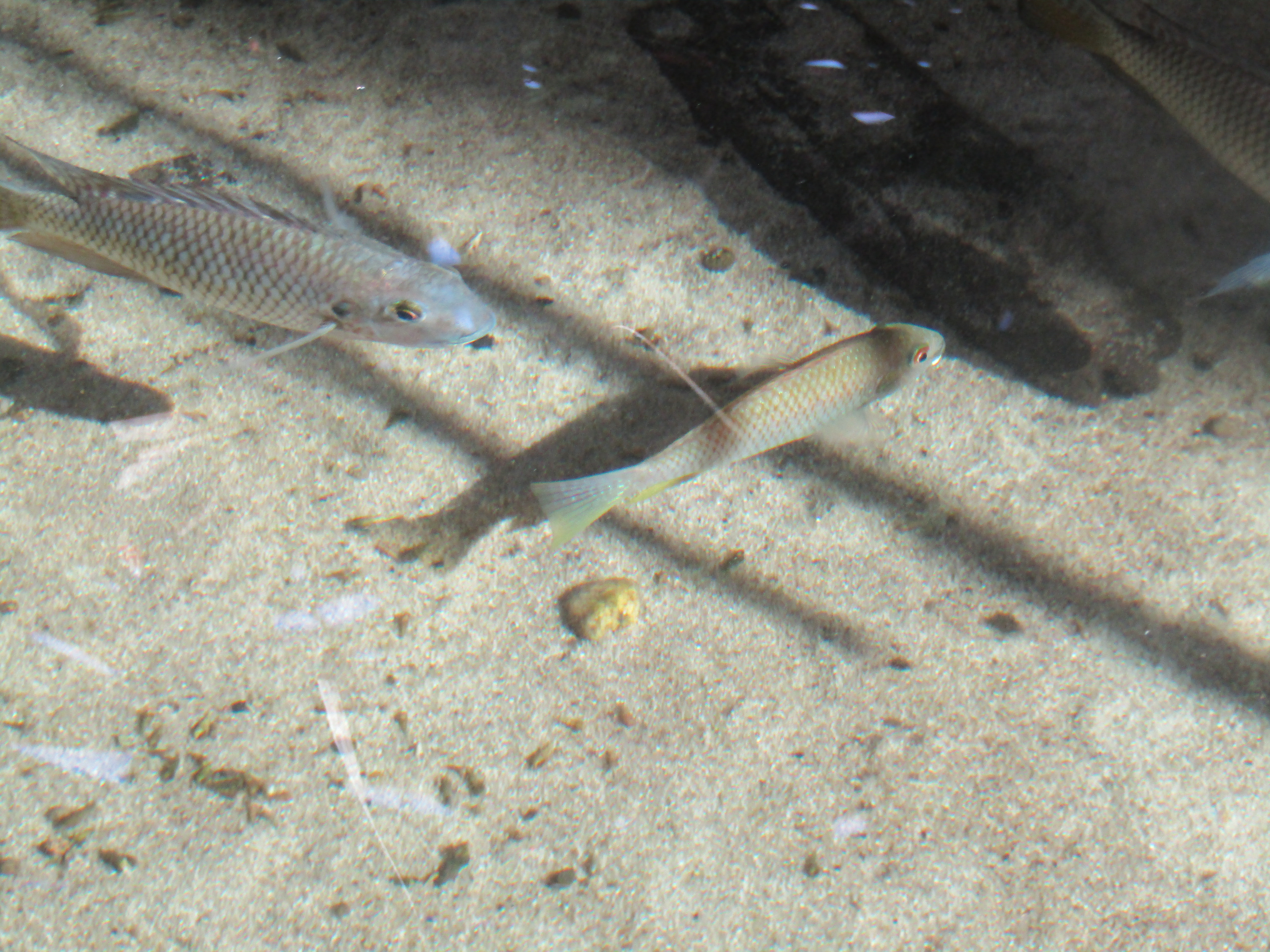

Conservation status
- Critically Endangered (IUCN 3.1)

Scientific classification
- Kingdom: Animalia
- Phylum: Chordata
- Class: Actinopterygii
- Order: Cichliformes
- Family: Cichlidae
- Genus: Coptodon
- Species: C. deckerti

Binomial name
- Coptodon deckerti (Thys van den Audenaerde, 1967)

Synonyms
- Tilapia deckerti Thys van den Audenaerde, 1967

= Coptodon deckerti =

Species of fish

Coptodon deckerti is a critically endangered species of fish in the cichlid family, endemic to Lake Ejagham in western Cameroon. It is threatened by pollution and sedimentation from human activities, and potentially also by emissions of carbon dioxide (CO_{2}) from the lake's bottom (compare Lake Nyos), although Ejagham is too shallow to contain very high amounts of this gas. A species of catfish from the genus Parauchenoglanis has recently been introduced to the lake, and this probably presents a serious threat to the endemic cichlids.

It was formerly recognized as the only cichlid endemic to Lake Ejagham, but six others were described in 2010 and 2011 (which has resulted in some historical confusion over its size and ecology). It reaches up to about 10 cm (4 in) in standard length and closely resembles the larger C. nigrans.

The specific name of the cichlid honours German zoologist Kurt Deckert (1907-1987), who was curator of fishes at the Museum für Naturkunde in Berlin, for his assistance to Thys van den Audenaerde when he visited the museum, and for spending many hours providing required and useful data for that authors research into the Cichlidae.
