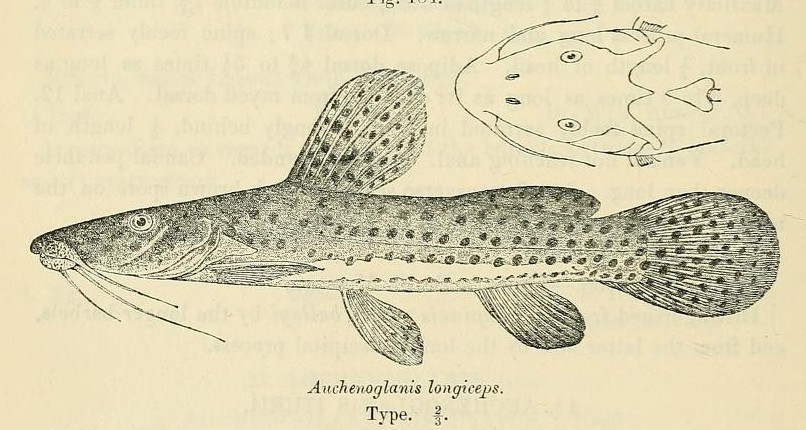
- Parauchenoglanis longiceps

Scientific classification
- Kingdom: Animalia
- Phylum: Chordata
- Class: Actinopterygii
- Order: Siluriformes
- Family: Auchenoglanididae
- Genus: Parauchenoglanis; Boulenger, 1911

Type species
- Pimelodus guttatus Lönnberg, 1895

Species
- See text.

= Parauchenoglanis =

Genus of fishes

Parauchenoglanis is a genus of claroteid catfishes native to Africa.

The range of the genus Parauchenoglanis stretches from the coastal lowlands of Benin and Nigeria to the Okavango and upper Zambezi River systems in Botswana and Zambia.

== Species ==
Parauchenoglanis currently contains the following 19 recognized species:

- Parauchenoglanis ahli (Holly, 1930)
- Parauchenoglanis altipinnis (Boulenger, 1911)
- Parauchenoglanis balayi (Sauvage, 1879)
- Parauchenoglanis buettikoferi (Popta, 1913)
- Parauchenoglanis chiumbeensis Yonela Sithole, Emmanuel J W M N Vreven, Pedro H N Bragança, Tobias Musschoot, Albert Chakona. 2024
- Parauchenoglanis dolichorhinus Yonela Sithole, Emmanuel J W M N Vreven, Pedro H N Bragança, Tobias Musschoot, Albert Chakona. 2024
- Parauchenoglanis ernstswartzi Yonela Sithole, Emmanuel J W M N Vreven, Pedro H N Bragança, Tobias Musschoot, Albert Chakona. 2024
- Parauchenoglanis longiceps (Boulenger, 1913)
- Parauchenoglanis lueleensis Yonela Sithole, Emmanuel J W M N Vreven, Pedro H N Bragança, Tobias Musschoot, Albert Chakona. 2024
- Parauchenoglanis luendaensis Yonela Sithole, Emmanuel J W M N Vreven, Pedro H N Bragança, Tobias Musschoot, Albert Chakona. 2024
- Parauchenoglanis megalasma Yonela Sithole, Emmanuel J W M N Vreven, Pedro H N Bragança, Tobias Musschoot, Albert Chakona. 2024
- Parauchenoglanis monkei (Keilhack, 1910) (Dotted catfish)
- Parauchenoglanis ngamensis (Boulenger, 1911) (Zambezi grunter)
- Parauchenoglanis pantherinus (Pellegrin, 1929)
- Parauchenoglanis patersoni Yonela Sithole, Emmanuel J W M N Vreven, Pedro H N Bragança, Tobias Musschoot, Albert Chakona. 2024
- Parauchenoglanis poikilos Yonela Sithole, Emmanuel J W M N Vreven, Pedro H N Bragança, Tobias Musschoot, Albert Chakona. 2024
- Parauchenoglanis punctatus (Boulenger, 1902)
- Parauchenoglanis stiassnyae (Modimo, Bernt, Monsembula Iyaba, Mbimbi & Liyandja, 2024)
- Parauchenoglanis zebratus (Sithole, Musschoot, Huyghe, Chakona & Vreven, 2023)
