= Melanie Stiassny =

Curator of Ichthyology at the American Museum of Natural History

- Born: January 17, 1953 (age 73); Bielefeld, Germany
- Education: King's College London
- Scientific career
- Fields: Ichthyology, evolutionary biology
- Workplaces: American Museum of Natural History; Richard Gilder Graduate School; Harvard University; Columbia University

Melanie Lisa Jane Stiassny (born 17 January 1953 in Bielefeld, Germany) is the Axelrod Research Curator of Ichthyology at the American Museum of Natural History. Her research interests focus on freshwater biodiversity documentation and systematic ichthyology in the Old World tropics, including tropical Africa (especially in the Congo River) and Madagascar. She has published broadly on the biogeography conservation and systematics of teleosts.

== Education ==
Stiassny holds both a BS and a Ph.D. from King's College London, and has previously taught at Harvard University and Columbia University and is now a professor in the Richard Gilder Graduate School at the American Museum of Natural History. She is a member of the National Council of the World Wildlife Fund, the Advisory Council of Conservation International’s Center for Applied Biodiversity Science, the Advisory Board of National Geographic Society’s Conservation Trust, and the Deutsche Cichliden Gesellschaft (DCG, German Cichlid Society).

== Research interests and contributions ==
Dr. Stiassny's early career began with large-scale and groundbreaking morphological studies exploring the evolution and relationships of the cichlids, labroids, and spiny-rayed fishes. As her fieldwork continued, she became ever more concerned with the conservation and biodiversity of freshwater fishes leading to her continued focus on fishes from Madagascar and Africa proper. Over a 10-year period, a multidisciplinary team led in part by Stiassny studied the complex ecosystems of the lower Congo River. Using a genetic analysis of fishes of the Teleogramma genus in the area, she has found evidence that the strength of the current and the extensive rapids in the last 200 km of the river form multiple barriers for fish, thus creating a series of tightly-packed, isolated habitats where populations develop independently: "We'd take fish from the other side of the river, and we looked at their DNA, we realized something very strange is happening, they're separated from each other. In some areas, only one fish crosses the river every two or three generations." This peculiar phenomenon accounts for the region's exceptional biodiversity, with 300 species of fish. She realized how complex the ecosystem was when they found fishes dying of decompression on the surface, which made them realize they were also dealing with fish population that lived at the bottom of what is a very deep river in some places. She enlisted the help of a team from the United States Geological Survey, which found the river was flowing into a canyon that was 580 feet deep, as well as very strong currents, including some flowing upriver.

Stiassny indicated she intends to go back to the Congo River her whole career, being interested in the remarkable variety present in the basin and in the key resource, and because of the key role that freshwater fisheries play in the region. She has been collaborating with the University of Kinshasa and the Marien Ngouabi University to train Congolese ichthyologists.

Stiassny was honored with the creation of the Stiassnyiformes in recognition of her contributions to ichthyology and systematics. Her research in the lower Congo led her to catalogue a new species of Teleogramma, which she chose to name Teleogramma obamaorum to recognize the interest of Barack and Michelle Obama for science education and conservation in Africa.

Stiassny was the lead curator for the renovation of the American Museum of Natural History's Irma and Paul Milstein Family Hall of Ocean Life, which reopened its doors in 2003. About what they were trying to achieve with the renovations, Stiassny said: "I want people to walk away with an understanding of how remarkably superlative the oceans really are. Not just in terms of sheer size and beauty, but also in their ecological complexity and the tremendous biological wealth they contain. Perhaps above all, I want them to understand how absolutely critical ocean health is to the health of all life on Earth. The oceans are a series of interconnected ecosystems that can unravel very, very, quickly."

Stiassny is on the faculty of the Graduate Center of the City University of New York.

== Taxa described by her ==
- See Category:Taxa named by Melanie Stiassny

== Taxa named in her honor ==
- The killifish, Aphanius stiassnyae
- The African lampeye, Hypsopanchax stiassnyae
- The catfish, Parauchenoglanis stiassnyae
