= Konia =

Konia may refer to:

- Kōnia (1808–1857), Hawaiian high chiefess
- Konia (fish), a cichlid genus containing the Dikume (K. dikume) and the Konye (K. eisentrauti)
- Konia, Guinea
- Konia, Paphos, a village in Cyprus

== See also ==
- Konya (disambiguation),
