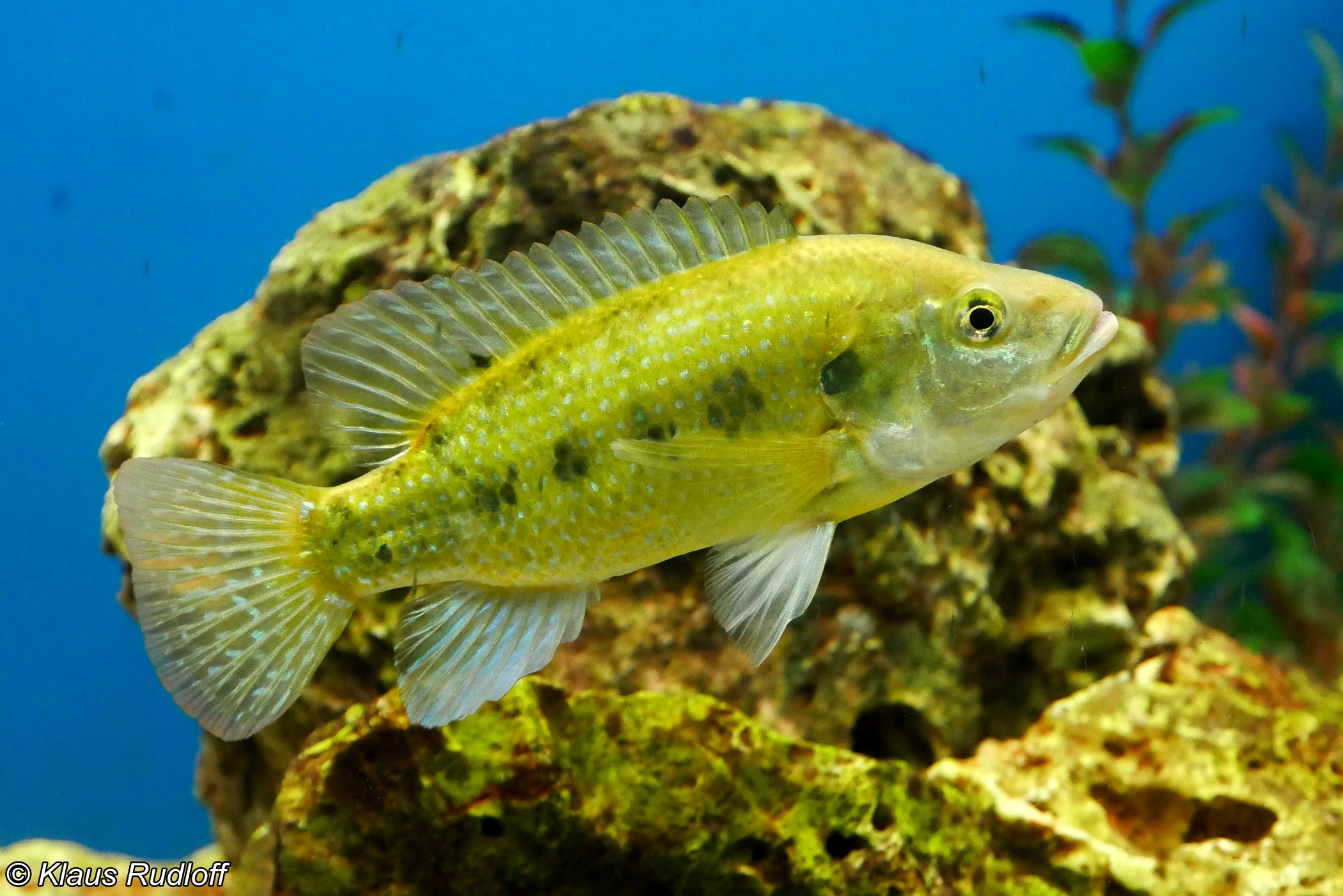
- Tristramella simonis

Scientific classification
- Kingdom: Animalia
- Phylum: Chordata
- Class: Actinopterygii
- Order: Cichliformes
- Family: Cichlidae
- Tribe: Oreochromini
- Genus: Tristramella; Trewavas, 1942

Type species
- Hemichromis sacra Günther, 1865

= Tristramella =

Genus of fishes

Tristramella is a genus of oreochromines, freshwater fishes in the cichlid family. The members of this genus prefer standing waters and their native range is restricted to the Jordan River system, including Lake Tiberias (Kinneret), in Israel and Syria, with introduced populations in a few other places in Syria. Its members are among the few cichlids native to Western Asia, the others being Astatotilapia flaviijosephi, Coptodon zillii, Iranocichla, Oreochromis aureus, O. niloticus and Sarotherodon galilaeus.

Locally, T. simonis remains common and an important part of fisheries, but overall it has declined, and it is considered threatened. In contrast, T. sacra has been extinct since 1989–90, possibly due to the disappearance of its breeding habitat, marshes in Lake Tiberias.

Tristramella reach up to 25–28 cm (10–11 in) in total length. Overall they resemble typical tilapias and the Tristramella species differ from each other mainly in details of their teeth, the proportional size of their head and the length of their jaw. They feed mostly on phyto– and zooplankton, but also take other small invertebrates, tiny fish, macrophytes and detritus. They are mouth brooders that lay a relatively small number (up to 250) of relatively large eggs. Although hybrids are well known among tilapias, hybrids between Tristramella and other tilapias are unknown. Despite both living in Lake Tiberias and them being close relatives, hybridization between T. simonis and the now-extinct T. sacra also is not known to have occurred.

The generic name Tristramella honours the English clergyman and naturalist Henry Baker Tristram (1822-1906) who collected cichlids in Palestine for the British Museum of Natural History. In the past they were included in the genus Tilapia instead.

== Taxonomy and species ==
There are currently two recognized species in this genus:

- †Tristramella sacra (Günther, 1865) – long jaw tristramella
- Tristramella simonis (Günther, 1864) – short jaw tristramella

Two other extinct populations, intermedia of Lake Hula and magdelainae of the vicinity of Damascus, are of uncertain taxonomic status. In the past, they were recognized as subspecies of T. simonis by FishBase and they are still recognized as valid, separate species by the IUCN, which however has not reviewed their status since 2006. Today FishBase and Catalog of Fishes consider both intermidia and magdelainea as synonyms of T. simonis.
