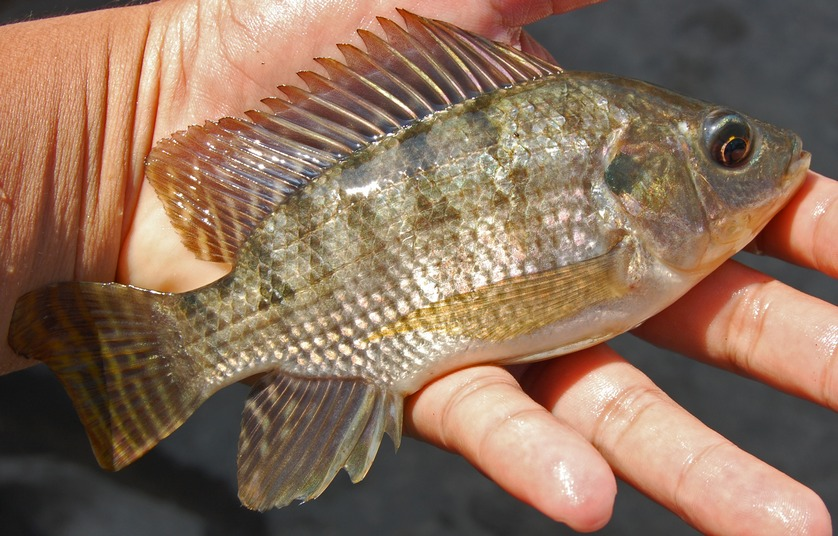
- Oreochromis niloticus

Scientific classification
- Kingdom: Animalia
- Phylum: Chordata
- Class: Actinopterygii
- Order: Cichliformes
- Family: Cichlidae
- Subfamily: Pseudocrenilabrinae
- Tribe: Oreochromini; Dunz & Schliewen, 2010

= Oreochromini =

Tribe of fishes

Oreochromini is a tribe of cichlids in the Pseudocrenilabrinae subfamily that is native to Africa and Western Asia, but a few species have been widely introduced to other parts of the world. It was formerly considered to be part of the tribe Tilapiini but more recent workers have found that the Tilapiini sensu lato is paraphyletic. Despite this change, species in Oreochromini are still referred to by the common name tilapia and some of the most important tilapia in aquaculture —certain species of Oreochromis and Sarotherodon— are part of this tribe. In contrast, several species have small ranges and are seriously threatened; a few are already extinct (Tristramella sacra) or possibly extinct (Oreochromis ismailiaensis and O. lidole).

Cichlids in the tribe Oreochromini are mouthbrooders, carrying the eggs and fry in their mouths instead of placing them in a nest. The numerous Oreochromis species are maternal mouthbrooders, meaning only the female looks after the eggs and fry, with the male offering no protection or help at all. Instead, they form leks where they compete with one another for further opportunities to mate with females. By contrast, most of the fewer Sarotherodon species are biparental mouthbrooders, with both parents protecting the eggs and fry. A few, such as S. melanotheron, are paternal mouthbrooders, with only the male caring for the eggs and fry. In addition, some species usually placed in Oreochromis might belong into Sarotherodon. Either this is incorrect due to hybridization effects, or they are not maternal mouthbrooders, or the diversity of brood care is even higher among these cichlids than hitherto believed.

== Genera ==
The following genera are classified within the Oreochromini:

Genus	Extant species #
Alcolapia Thys van den Audenaerde, 1969	4
Danakilia Thys van den Audenaerde, 1969	2
Iranocichla Coad, 1982	2
Konia Trewavas, 1972	2
Myaka Trewavas, 1972	1
Oreochromis Günther, 1889	37
Pungu Trewavas, 1972	1
Sarotherodon Rüppell, 1852	13
Stomatepia Trewavas, 1962	3
Tristramella Trewavas, 1942	1
