= Astatotilapia flaviijosephi =

Conservation status
- Vulnerable (IUCN 3.1)

Scientific classification
- Kingdom: Animalia
- Phylum: Chordata
- Class: Actinopterygii
- Order: Cichliformes
- Family: Cichlidae
- Genus: Astatotilapia
- Species: A. flaviijosephi

Binomial name
- Astatotilapia flaviijosephi (Lortet, 1883)

Synonyms
- Chromis flaviijosephi Lortet, 1883; Haplochromis flaviijosephi (Lortet, 1883); Haplochromis flavijosephi (Lortet, 1883); Tilapia flaviijosephi (Lortet, 1883)

Species of fish

Astatotilapia flaviijosephi, the Jordan mouthbrooder, is a vulnerable species of freshwater fish in the family Cichlidae (cichlids). It is found in the central Jordan River system, including Lake Tiberias (Kinneret), in Israel, Jordan and Syria, making it the only haplochromine cichlid to naturally range outside of Africa. This species is too small to be of significant importance to fisheries, unlike the only other cichlids native to the Levant, the economically important tilapias (Oreochromis aureus, O. niloticus, Sarotherodon galilaeus, Coptodon zillii and Tristramella).

The specific name flaviijosephi refers to the historian Titus Flavius Josephus (37–c. 100 CE).

== Habitat and conservation status ==
The natural habitats of A. flaviijosephi are streams, springs, canals, pools and shallow waters in lakes, especially in areas with stones or aquatic vegetation. The various subpopulations are isolated from each other, with some being lacustrine and others essentially riverine. The water temperature in its range vary quite significantly with season, at least from 14 to 28.5 °C (57–83.5 °F), but aquarium studies have shown that A. flaviijosephi are almost completely inactive at the lowermost range.

A. flaviijosephi is threatened by habitat loss caused by drought, water extraction and pollution. It may also be threatened by introduced species, although they do not appear to have affected the Lake Tiberias population.

== Appearance ==
A. flaviijosephi is the smallest cichlid native to its range. It reaches up to 12.8 cm (5 in) in total length, but most adults are about 5–8 cm (2–3 in). Males grow larger than females.

Like many other cichlids, its colour pattern varies with sex, age and mood; some of these colour changes can occur quite rapidly. The standard pattern is overall silvery–greyish to silvery–tan with a vertical dark or pale line below the eye. Males have a few relatively large yellow "egg–spots" on the anal fin and a few dotty orangish lines along the side of the body. When afraid they get about ten dark grey vertical bars on their body and when breeding two horizontal stripes. The latter pattern is stronger in courting males when most markings and colours become much more intense and contrasting, with blue–black underparts and a bright blue chin. Nursing females are also more contrastingly patterned than the standard breeding season pattern, but much less intense than the courting males.

== Behavior ==
=== Breeding ===
A. flaviijosephi breeds in the spring and summer, and a female is able to spawn more than once in a season. Females will already breed when 4 cm (1.6 in) long and males when 5 cm (2.0 in). Breeding males are highly territorial and will kill another adult male if he is unable to escape, as can happen if kept in an aquarium that is too small. Like other haplochromines, A. flaviijosephi is a mouthbrooder. The eggs are laid by the female and fertilized by the male in a small pit that he has dug in the bottom (otherwise the male does not participate in the brood care). Shortly after they are picked up by the female, which broods them in her mouth. The young are released after about two-and-a-half to five weeks when they are 0.8–1.4 cm (0.31–0.55 in) long. Brooding time depends on water temperature; it takes about twice as long at 20 °C (68 °F) compared to 27.5 °C (82 °F). Sometimes the young are allowed to return to the female and seek security in her mouth for a couple of days after the release.

=== Feeding ===
This cichlid is a predator that mostly feeds on small invertebrates, but also will take fish fry, tiny fish up to about half the size of the A. flaviijosephi itself and aquatic vegetation. Adult males mostly eat freshwater snails, while females mostly eat insects and their larvae (especially chironomids), worms and amphipods. This difference in diet is also reflected in differences in the teeth of the sexes.
