= Iranocichla hormuzensis =

Scientific classification
- Domain: Eukaryota
- Kingdom: Animalia
- Phylum: Chordata
- Class: Actinopterygii
- Order: Cichliformes
- Family: Cichlidae
- Genus: Iranocichla
- Species: I. hormuzensis

Binomial name
- Iranocichla hormuzensis Coad, 1982

Species of fish

Iranocichla hormuzensis, also known as the Iranian cichlid or Hormoz cichlid, is a species of mouthbrooding fish from the cichlid family. It is restricted to freshwater and brackish habitats in the drainage of the Mehran River in southern Iran above the Straits of Hormuz. It was formerly regarded as the only species in its genus, but another species, I. persa was described in 2016. These are the only cichlids native to Iran and among the few cichlids in Asia.

I. hormuzensis attains a standard length of about 11 cm (4.3 in) and a total length of about 13 cm (5.1 in). It has a stout body. Young exhibit a silver-green coloration with no fin pigmentation. The adult is mostly black with silver speckles on the body and barring on the dorsal fin. Male adults are distinguished by their longer anal and pelvic fins, and female adults are distinguished by their longer heads. Unlike I. persa, the breast and head of nuptial male I. hormuzensis is blackish (not orange). Although it has not been rated by the IUCN, some authorities believe it is highly threatened.
