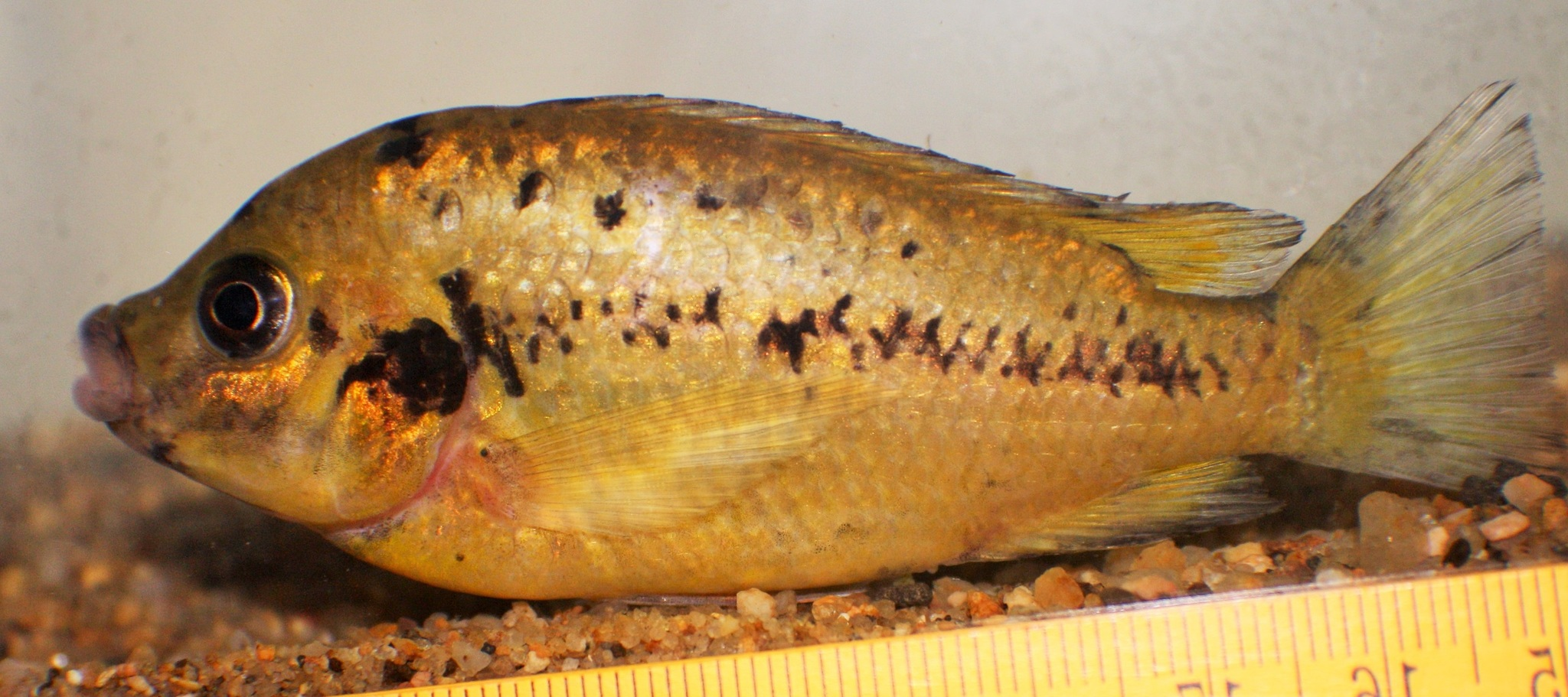

Conservation status
- Critically Endangered (IUCN 3.1)

Scientific classification
- Kingdom: Animalia
- Phylum: Chordata
- Class: Actinopterygii
- Order: Cichliformes
- Family: Cichlidae
- Subfamily: Pseudocrenilabrinae
- Tribe: Oreochromini
- Genus: Pungu; Trevawas, 1972
- Species: P. maclareni

Binomial name
- Pungu maclareni (Trewavas, 1962)

Synonyms
- Barombia maclareni Trewavas, 1962

= Pungu =

Species of fish

The pungu (Pungu maclareni) is a species of cichlid endemic to Lake Barombi Mbo in Cameroon where it prefers shallow waters of about 1 to 3 metres (3.3 to 9.8 ft) in depth. It feeds on invertebrates, sponges, diatoms and macrophytes. This species can reach a length of 10 centimetres (3.9 in) SL. It is currently the only known member of its genus, nested within the Sarotherodon. The pungu is threatened because of pollution and sedimentation from human activities. Konia, Myaka and Stomatepia are three other equally threatened genera of cichlids that also are endemic to Lake Barombi Mbo. The specific name of this fish honours the Fisheries Development Officer of Nigeria, P.I.R. MacLaren (died 1957), who used his position to collect specimens of fishes, including the type of this species. The genus name honors common name of this fish used by the Barombi people ("pungu").
