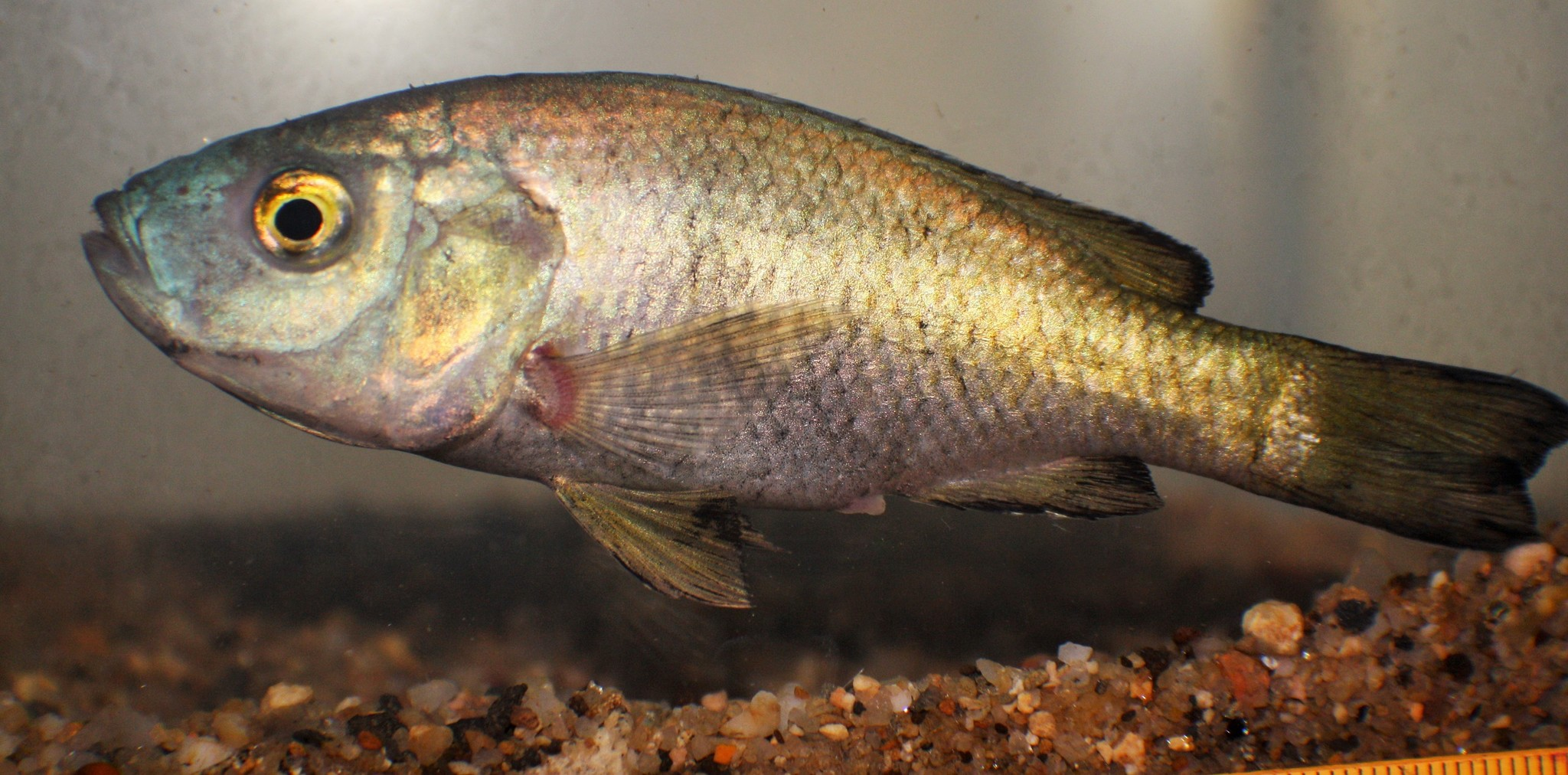

Conservation status
- Critically Endangered (IUCN 3.1)

Scientific classification
- Kingdom: Animalia
- Phylum: Chordata
- Class: Actinopterygii
- Division: Teleostei
- Order: Cichliformes
- Family: Cichlidae
- Subfamily: Pseudocrenilabrinae
- Tribe: Oreochromini
- Genus: Myaka; Trewavas, 1972
- Species: M. myaka

Binomial name
- Myaka myaka Trewavas, 1972

= Myaka =

Species of fish

The myaka (Myaka myaka) is a critically endangered species of cichlid endemic to Lake Barombi Mbo in western Cameroon. It prefers open, deeper waters where it feeds on phytoplankton and small insects, only venturing into shallower waters to spawn. This species can reach a length of 6.7 centimetres (2.6 in) SL. It is currently the only known species in the genus Myaka, but it is very close to Sarotherodon. The myaka is threatened because of pollution and sedimentation due to human activities. It is potentially also threatened by large emissions of carbon dioxide (CO_{2}) from the lake's bottom (compare Lake Nyos), although studies indicate that Barombo Mbo lacks excess amounts of this gas. Konia, Pungu and Stomatepia are three other equally threatened genera of cichlids that also are endemic to Lake Barombi Mbo.
