= Stomatepia mongo =

Conservation status
- Critically Endangered (IUCN 3.1)

Scientific classification
- Kingdom: Animalia
- Phylum: Chordata
- Class: Actinopterygii
- Order: Cichliformes
- Family: Cichlidae
- Genus: Stomatepia
- Species: S. mongo

Binomial name
- Stomatepia mongo Trewavas, 1972

Species of fish

Stomatepia mongo, the mongo, is a species of cichlid endemic to Lake Barombi Mbo in western Cameroon. It can reach a length of 17.3 centimetres (6.8 in) SL. This species is seriously threatened by pollution and sedimentation due to human activities. It is potentially also threatened by large emissions of carbon dioxide (CO_{2}) from the lake's bottom (compare Lake Nyos), although studies indicate that Barombo Mbo lacks excess amounts of this gas. Even compared to other cichlids that are endemic Lake Barombi Mbo, Stomatepia mongo is a very rare species.

Very little is known about its behavior, but it has been seen swimming near the bottom, apparently looking for small prey items in the detritus or sand. It sometimes occurs in small groups.
