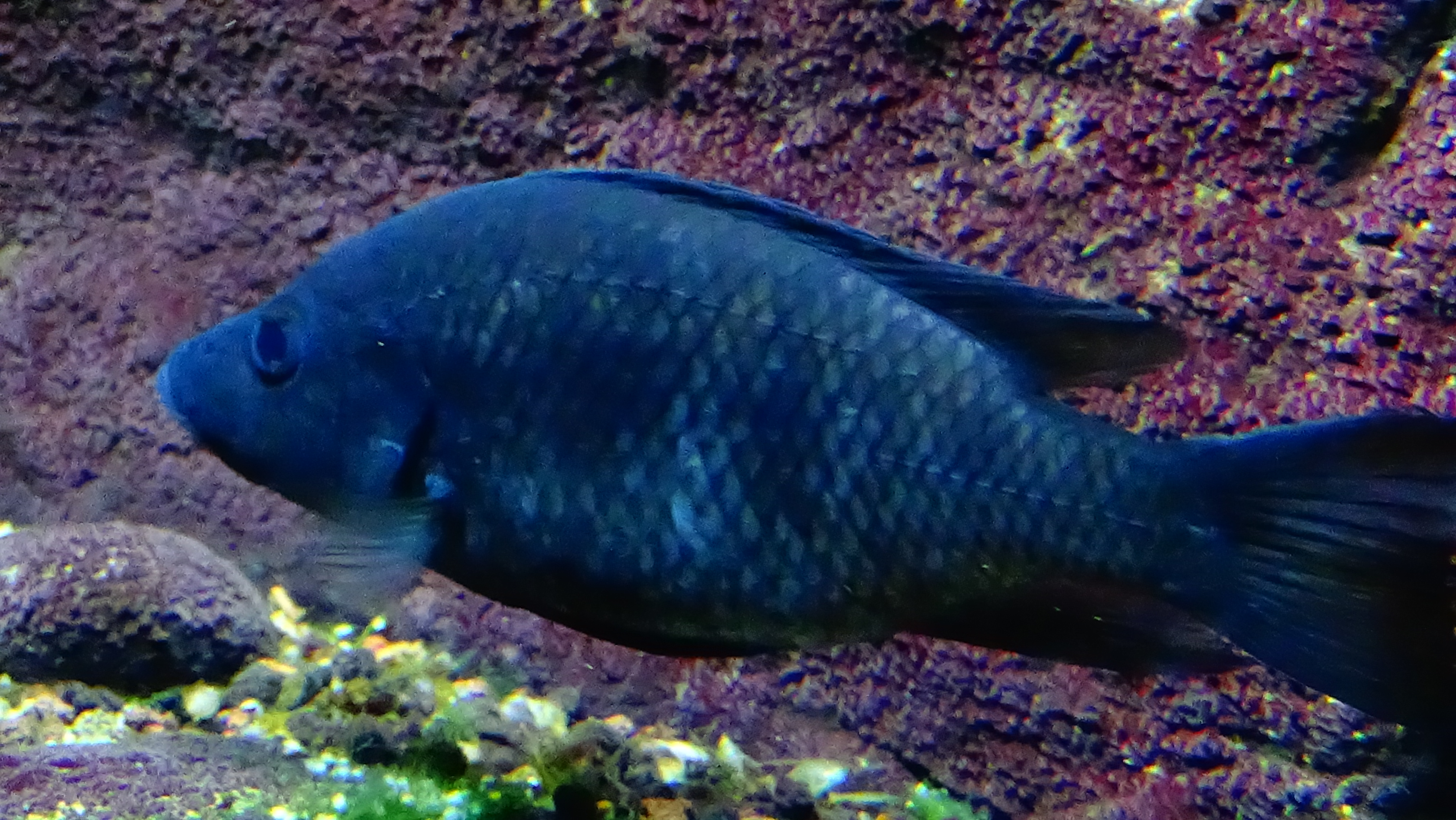
- Stomatepia pindu

Scientific classification
- Kingdom: Animalia
- Phylum: Chordata
- Class: Actinopterygii
- Division: Teleostei
- Order: Cichliformes
- Family: Cichlidae
- Tribe: Oreochromini
- Genus: Stomatepia; Trewavas, 1962

Type species
- Paratilapia mariae Holly, 1930

= Stomatepia =

Genus of fishes

Stomatepia is a genus of cichlids endemic to Lake Barombi Mbo in western Cameroon. Although generally recognized as distinct, the genus is very close to Sarotherodon. The Stomatepia species are all recognized as critically endangered by the IUCN because of pollution and sedimentation due to human activities. They are potentially also threatened by large emissions of carbon dioxide (CO_{2}) from the lake's bottom (compare Lake Nyos), although studies indicate that Barombo Mbo lacks excess amounts of this gas. Konia, Myaka and Pungu are three other equally threatened genera of cichlids that also are endemic to Lake Barombi Mbo.

== Species ==
There are currently three recognized species in this genus:

- Stomatepia mariae (Holly, 1930) (Nsess)
- Stomatepia mongo Trewavas, 1972 (Mongo)
- Stomatepia pindu Trewavas, 1972 (Pindu)
