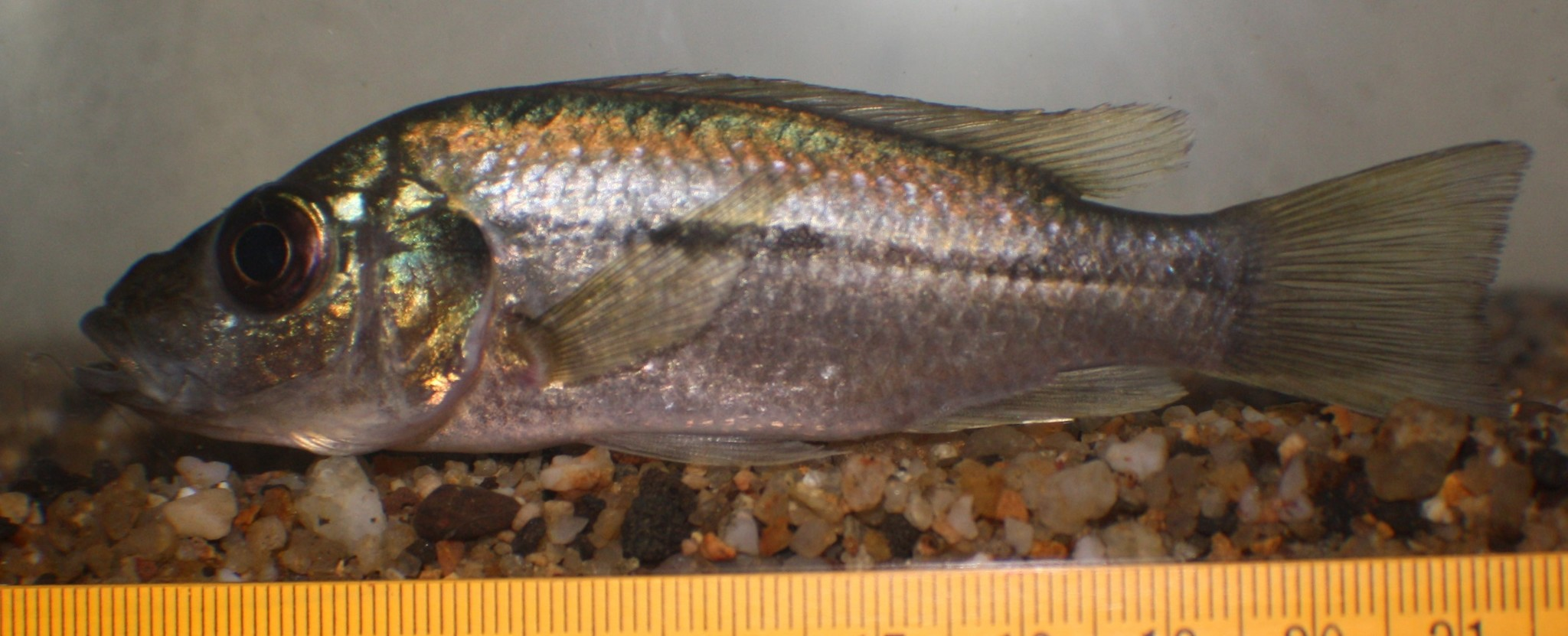

Conservation status
- Critically Endangered (IUCN 3.1)

Scientific classification
- Kingdom: Animalia
- Phylum: Chordata
- Class: Actinopterygii
- Order: Cichliformes
- Family: Cichlidae
- Genus: Stomatepia
- Species: S. mariae

Binomial name
- Stomatepia mariae (Holly, 1930)

Synonyms
- Paratilapia mariae Holly, 1930

= Nsess =

Species of fish

The nsess (Stomatepia mariae) is a species of cichlid endemic to Lake Barombi Mbo in western Cameroon. It can also be found in the aquarium trade. It is critically endangered because of pollution and sedimentation due to human activities. It is potentially also threatened by large emissions of carbon dioxide (CO_{2}) from the lake's bottom (compare Lake Nyos), although studies indicate that Barombo Mbo lacks excess amounts of this gas.

The nsess can reach up to 12 centimetres (4.7 in) in standard length and is predatory; it sometimes steals prey from the freshwater crab Potamon africanus.
