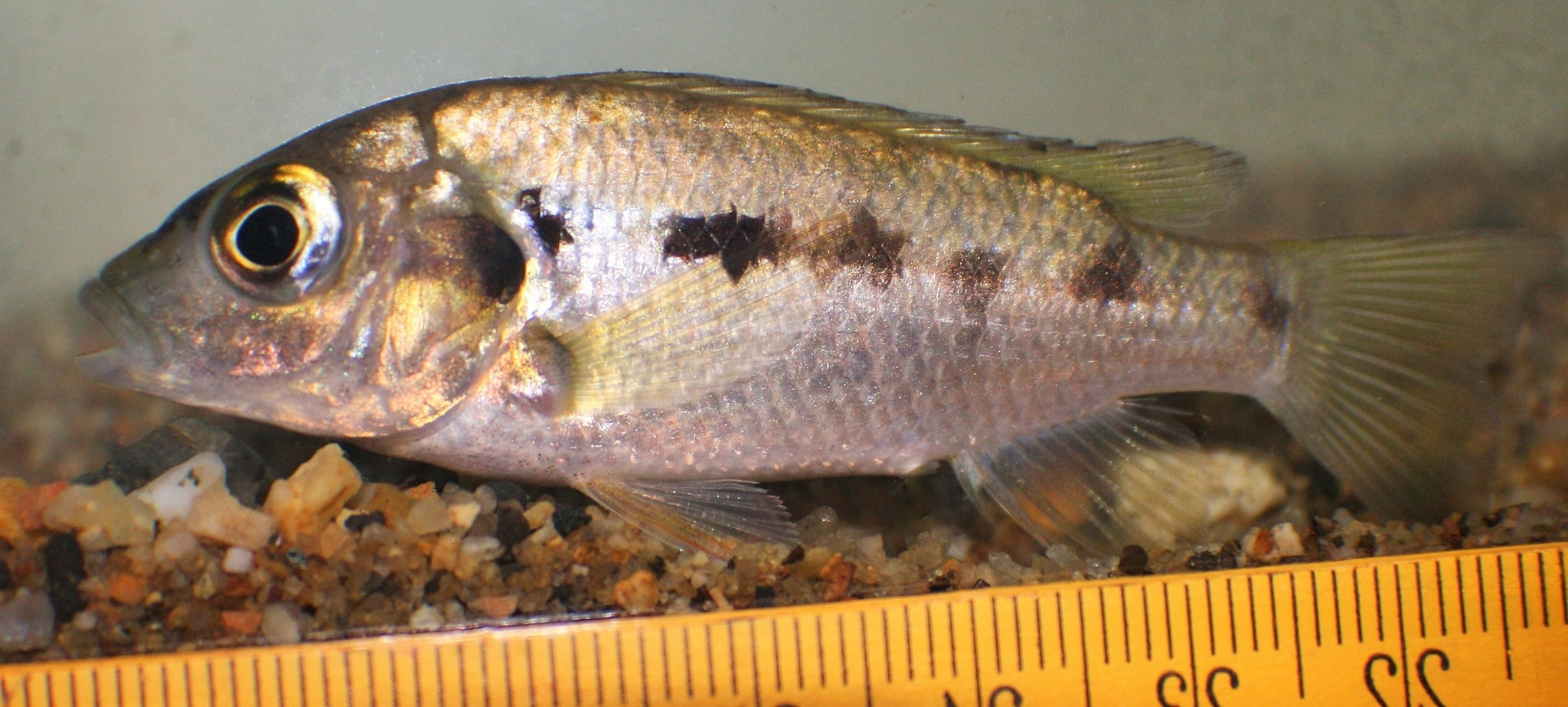

Conservation status
- Critically Endangered (IUCN 3.1)

Scientific classification
- Kingdom: Animalia
- Phylum: Chordata
- Class: Actinopterygii
- Order: Cichliformes
- Family: Cichlidae
- Genus: Konia
- Species: K. eisentrauti

Binomial name
- Konia eisentrauti (Trewavas, 1962)

Synonyms
- Konia einsentrauti (Trewavas, 1962); Tilapia eisentrauti Trewavas, 1962

= Konye =

Species of fish

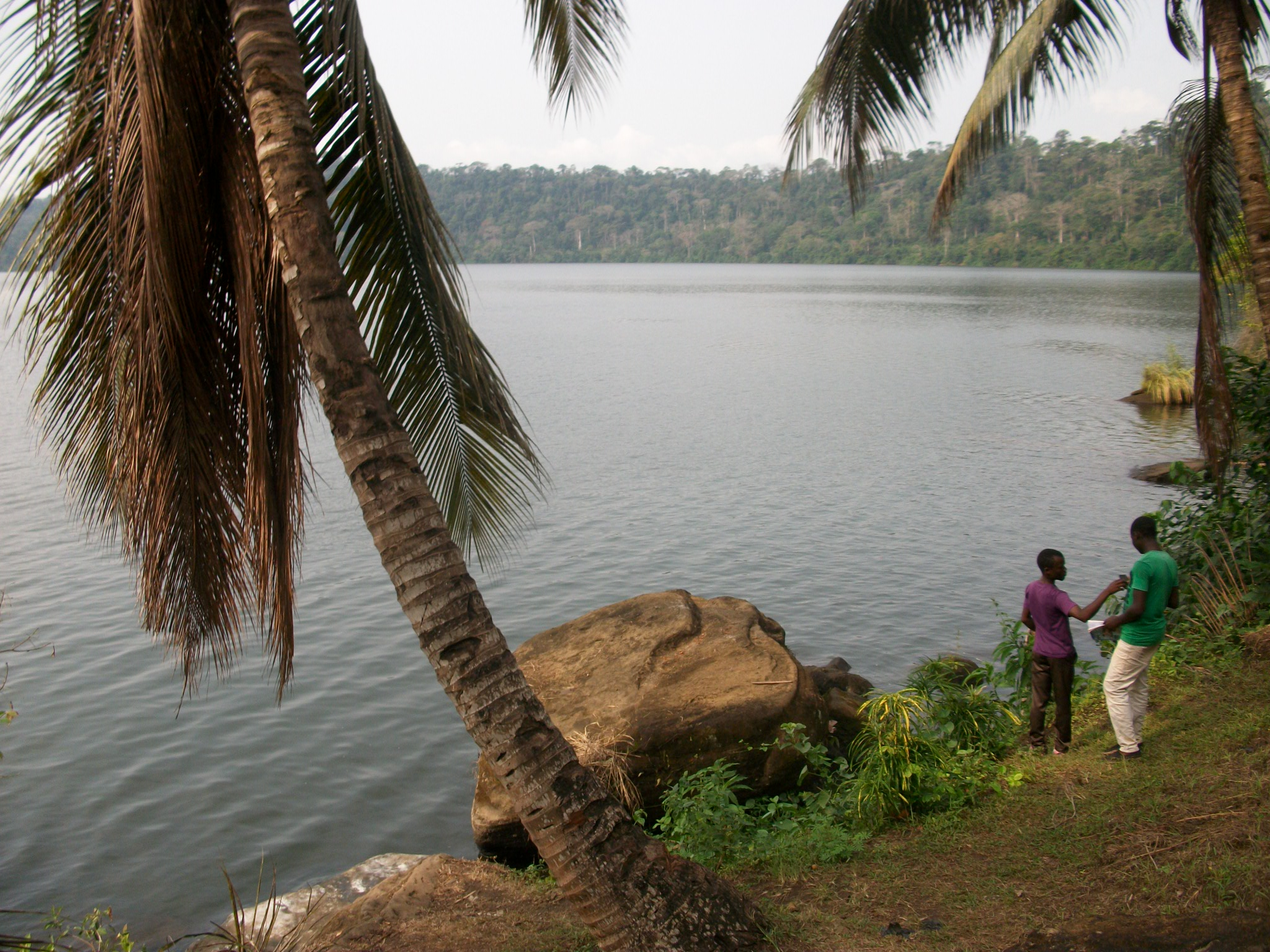
Lake Barombi

The konye (Konia eisentrauti) is a critically endangered species of fish in the family Cichlidae. It is endemic to Lake Barombi Mbo, a crater lake in western Cameroon. It is threatened because of pollution and sedimentation due to human activities, and potentially also by large emissions of carbon dioxide (CO_{2}) from the lake's bottom (compare Lake Nyos). This species can reach a length of 9.3 centimetres (3.7 in) TL.

== Description ==
The konye is a small species of cichlid growing to a length of about 9.3 cm (3.7 in). It is somewhat laterally compressed and has a horizontal mouth and sloping forehead. The fins are colourless. the dorsal fin has 15 to 16 spines and 10 to 11 soft rays; the anal fin has 3 spines and 8 to 9 soft rays. The colouring of this fish is distinctive, with a pale background shade and a row of dark blotches running down the back, and another row along each flank. The head is mostly bare of scales, the cheeks have a few scales and the body is fully scaled.

== Ecology ==
The konye is a benthopelagic species living in the warm upper waters of the lake where the temperature is around 26 °C (79 °F). It feeds on pieces of plant, scraping algae off rocks and stones, and also on mayflies, small invertebrates and fish eggs and sometimes steals food collected by freshwater crabs. This fish is a mouthbrooder. Either of the parents take the fertilised eggs into their mouth, and retain them there for protection. While mouthbrooding, the fish tends to remain quietly near the lakebed, and females tend to be more successful at raising the young than males. The incubation period is 7 to 10 days, the fry usually being expelled to live independently after about three weeks.

== Status ==
The konye is known from a single body of water, Lake Barombi Mbo, in Cameroon. The area around the lake is increasingly being deforested and used for slash-and-burn agriculture and palm oil plantations. This has encouraged sedimentation in the lake and pollution. Being more exposed to winds than previously, there is a danger that the waters of the lake may "turn over", with deep, cold, oxygen-poor water replacing the warm, nutrient-rich and well-oxygenated surface layers. Another possible hazard that the fish may face in this crater lake is outgassing, the emission of "burps" of CO_{2} formerly held in solution. An episode of this sort is thought to have occurred in 2007, when many deep water fish were found floating on the surface of the lake. As a result of these threats, the International Union for Conservation of Nature has assessed the conservation status of this fish as "critically endangered".

== Specific name ==
The specific name honours Martin Eisentraut (1902-1994), a German zoologist, who was leader of the expedition which collected the type.
