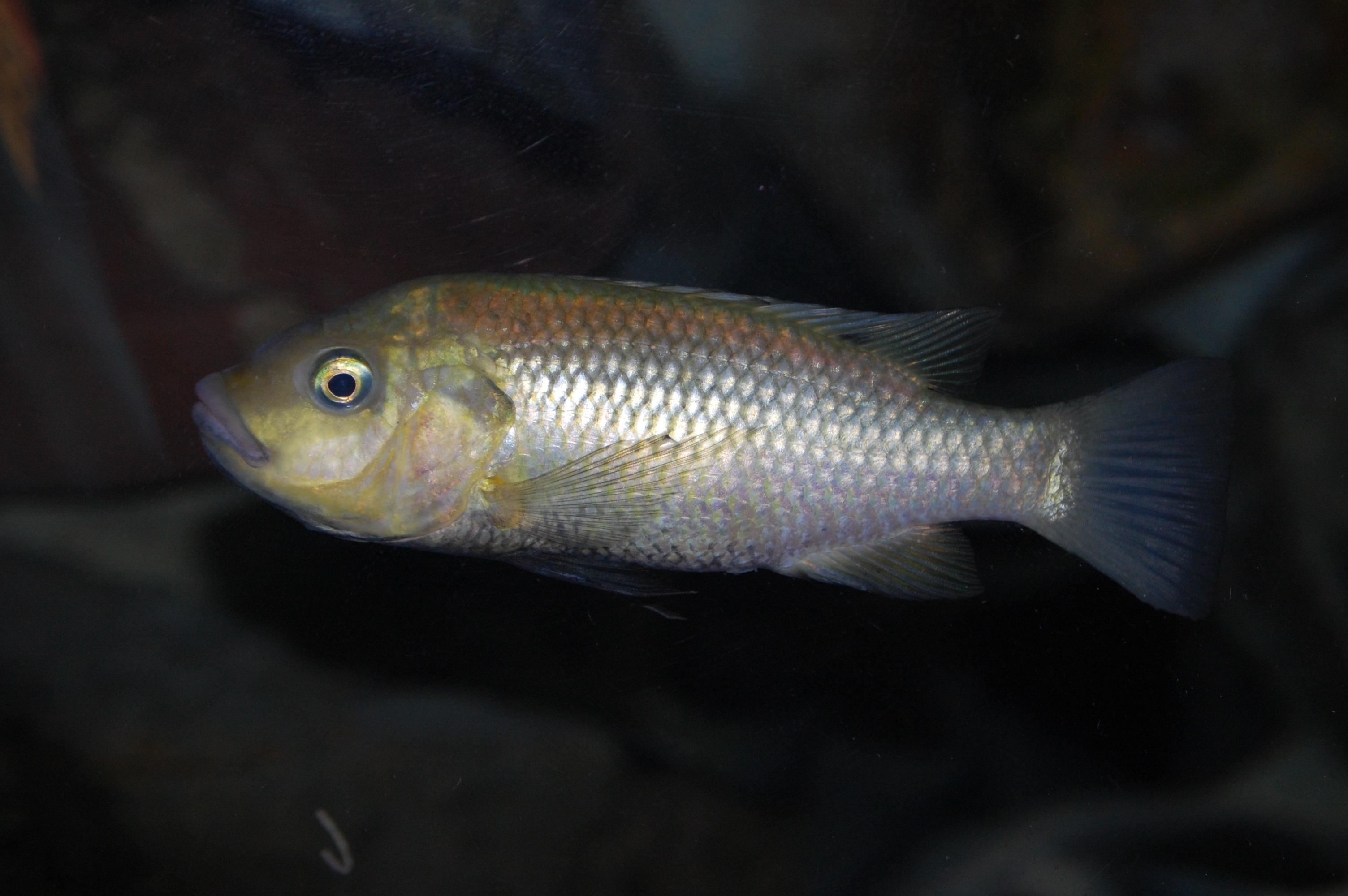

Conservation status
- Critically Endangered (IUCN 3.1)

Scientific classification
- Kingdom: Animalia
- Phylum: Chordata
- Class: Actinopterygii
- Order: Cichliformes
- Family: Cichlidae
- Genus: Sarotherodon
- Species: S. linnellii

Binomial name
- Sarotherodon linnellii (Lönnberg, 1903)

Synonyms
- Tilapia linnellii Lönnberg, 1903

= Sarotherodon linnellii =

Species of fish

Sarotherodon linnellii, sometimes known as the unga, blackfin tilapia or blackbelly tilapia, is a cichlid endemic to Lake Barombi Mbo in western Cameroon. This species reaches a length of 18.5 centimetres (7.3 in) SL. It is critically endangered because of pollution and sedimentation due to human activities. It is potentially also threatened by large emissions of carbon dioxide (CO_{2}) from the lake's bottom (compare Lake Nyos), although studies indicate that Barombo Mbo lacks excess amounts of this gas.

Juveniles mainly feed on insects (including their larvae) and adults mainly on phytoplankton.

The specific name honours a friend of Lönnberg's, Gunnar Linnell, a Swede who owned a plantation in Cameroon and who sent a collection of fishes and crustaceans from there which included the type of this fish.
