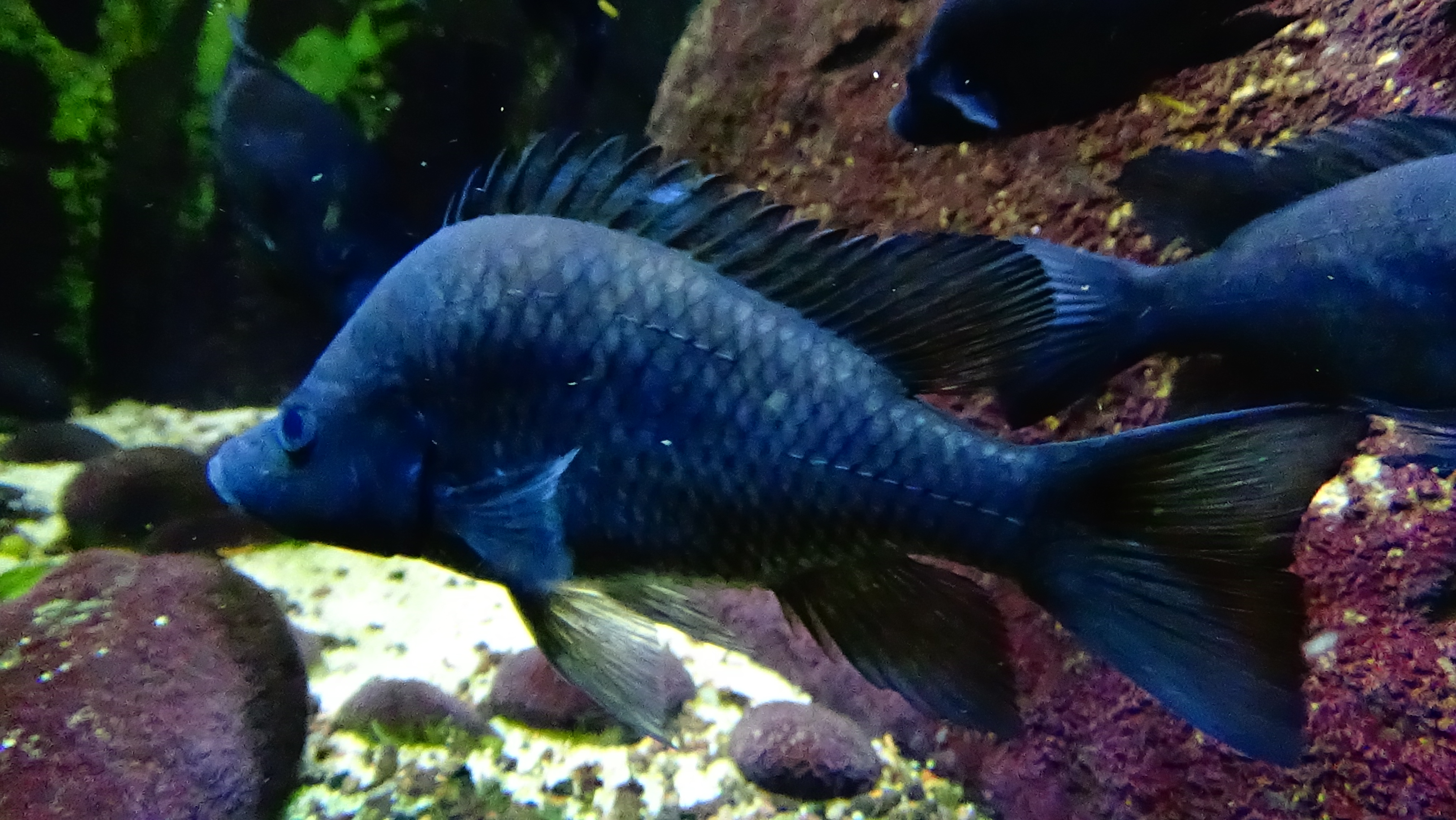

Conservation status
- Critically Endangered (IUCN 3.1)

Scientific classification
- Kingdom: Animalia
- Phylum: Chordata
- Class: Actinopterygii
- Order: Cichliformes
- Family: Cichlidae
- Genus: Stomatepia
- Species: S. pindu

Binomial name
- Stomatepia pindu Trewavas, 1972

= Pindu =

Species of fish

The pindu (Stomatepia pindu) is a critically endangered species of cichlid endemic to Lake Barombi Mbo in western Cameroon.

== Description ==
The normal coloration of the pindu is solid black, lightening when breeding and even more so if stressed. Both sexes are similar in colour. The body is elongated with a pointed head and nose with a relatively large mouth. It is a relatively robust with a body depth of 30.0–37.0% of its length. The lateral line system on the head is markedly enlarged and a series of dark blotches along the sides is often marked. The maximum size for males is 9.1 cm.

== Distribution and habitat ==
It is endemic to Lake Barombi Mbo, a volcanic crater lake with a diameter of just 3 miles in western Cameroon where only the top 40 metres contains acceptable oxygen levels to harbor vertebrate life.

== Habits ==
It is a predatory fish and reportedly is also a kleptoparasite on the freshwater crab Potamon africanus. The spawning of the pindu is a rather simple process, a pair of fish leave the main school to spawn directly on to the substrate. They do not construct any sort of scrape or nest and the female lays the eggs, the male to fertilises them and then the females picks them up in her mouth where they are retained for 3–4 weeks.

== Threats ==
It is threatened because of pollution and sedimentation due to human activities. It is potentially also threatened by large emissions of carbon dioxide (CO_{2}) from the lake's bottom (compare Lake Nyos), although studies indicate that Barombo Mbo lacks excess amounts of this gas. As well as water abstraction to supply the growing town of Kumba and the introduction of non-native species. However, at the moment, there are no introduced fish species on Lake Barombi Mbo and commercial fishing is banned.
