= Leka keppe =

Conservation status
- Critically Endangered (IUCN 3.1)

Scientific classification
- Kingdom: Animalia
- Phylum: Chordata
- Class: Actinopterygii
- Order: Cichliformes
- Family: Cichlidae
- Genus: Sarotherodon
- Species: S. lohbergeri

Binomial name
- Sarotherodon lohbergeri (Holly, 1930)

Synonyms
- Tilapia lohbergeri Holly, 1930

Species of fish

The leka keppe (Sarotherodon lohbergeri) or keppi, is a species of cichlid essentially endemic to Lake Barombi Mbo in western Cameroon, but additionally two juveniles have been found in the Kumba Stream (Kake River), a tributary of the lake's outlet. This species reaches a length of 16.2 centimetres (6.4 in) SL. It is threatened because of pollution and sedimentation due to human activities. It is potentially also threatened by large emissions of carbon dioxide (CO_{2}) from the lake's bottom (compare Lake Nyos), although studies indicate that Barombo Mbo lacks excess amounts of this gas.

This schooling species feeds on algae, tiny organisms such as rotifers and organic debris.

The specific name honours Karl Lohberger, who is thought to have been Holly's colleague at the Naturhistorisches Staatsmuseum in Vienna, he published six papers on fishes in 1929-1930 and then disappeared from the ichthyological record.
