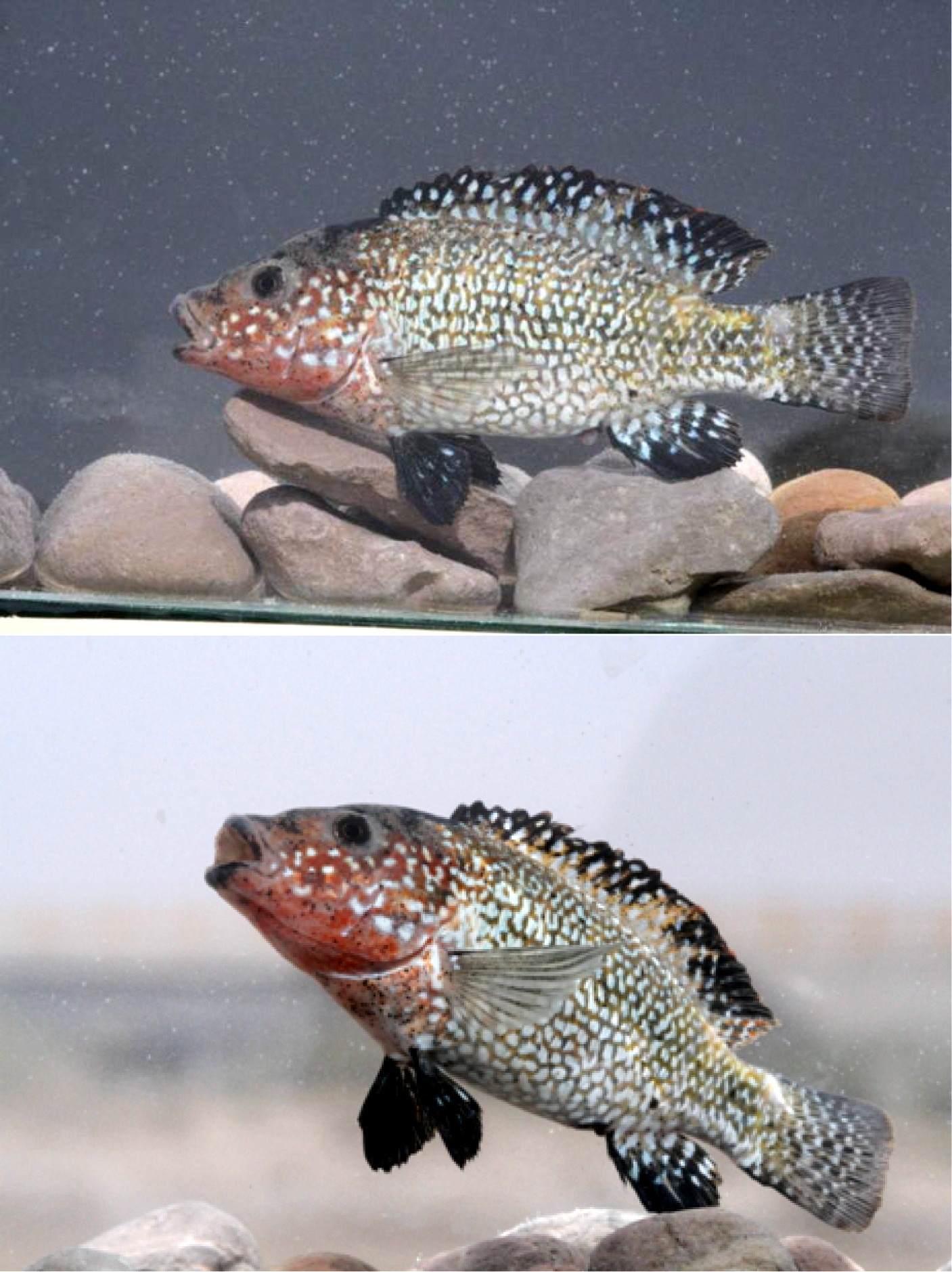

Scientific classification
- Kingdom: Animalia
- Phylum: Chordata
- Class: Actinopterygii
- Order: Cichliformes
- Family: Cichlidae
- Genus: Iranocichla
- Species: I. persa

Binomial name
- Iranocichla persa Esmaeili, Sayyadzadeh & Seehausen 2016

= Iranocichla persa =

Species of fish

Iranocichla persa is a species of mouth brooding cichlid which was described in 2016 from the drainage basins of the Shur, Hasanlangi and Minab Rivers which flow into the Persian Gulf at the Strait of Hormuz in southern Iran.
