= Konya (disambiguation) =

Konya is a city in Turkey.

Konya may also refer to one of the following

== Related to the city ==
- Konya Province, Ottoman Empire (Konya vilayet)
- Konya Province, Turkey
- Konya Subregion
- Konya (electoral district)
- Konya railway station

== People ==
- Kónya, Hungarian masculine given name and surname
- Konya Plummer (born 1997), Jamaican footballer
- Baba Medan Konya, South Sudanese state governor
- Jeff Konya (born 1973), American college athletics administrator
- Roseline Konya, Nigerian academic

== Entertainment ==
- Konya (TV series), a Bengali language Indian soap opera
