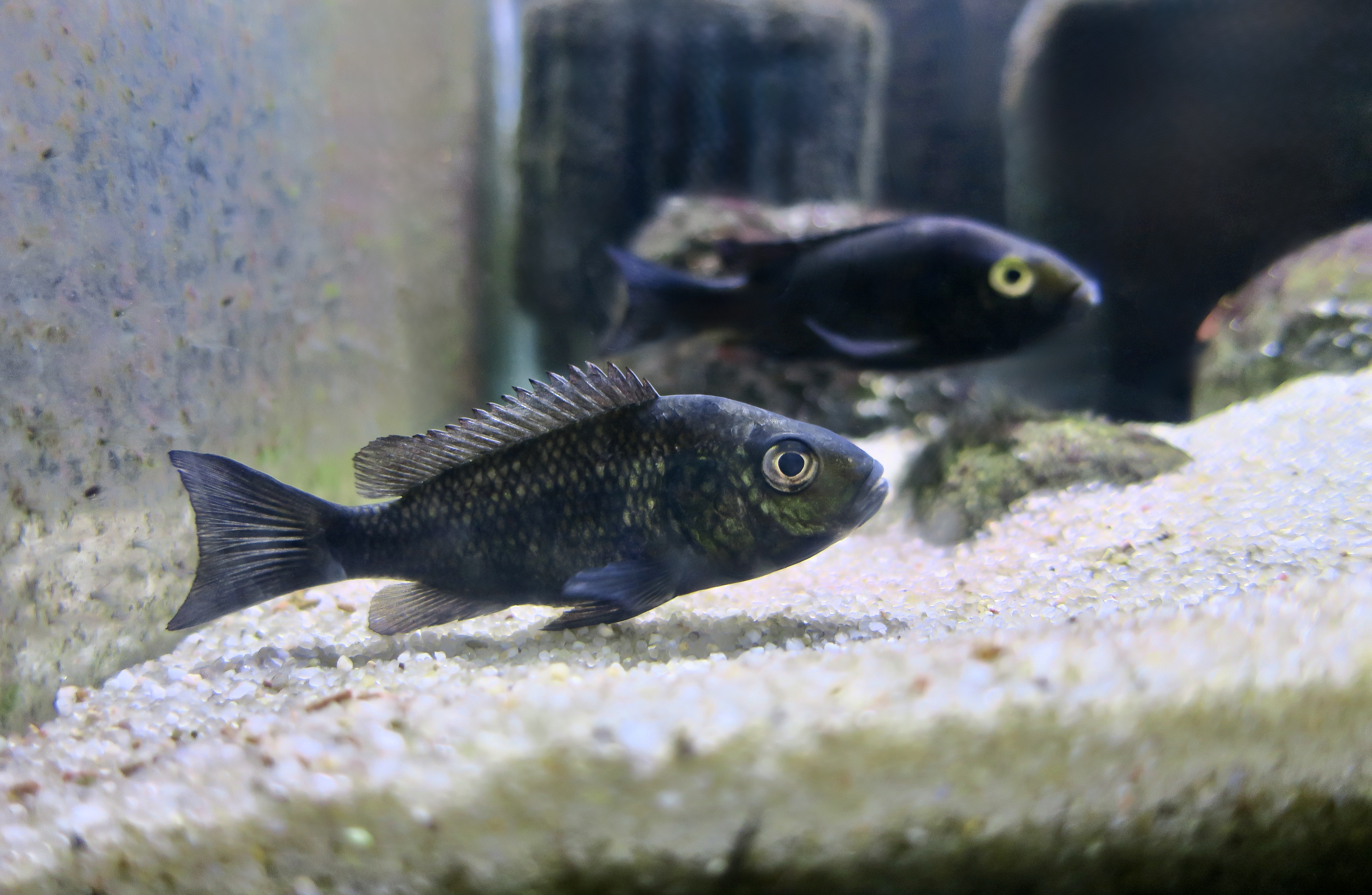

Conservation status
- Critically Endangered (IUCN 3.1)

Scientific classification
- Kingdom: Animalia
- Phylum: Chordata
- Class: Actinopterygii
- Order: Cichliformes
- Family: Cichlidae
- Genus: Sarotherodon
- Species: S. caroli

Binomial name
- Sarotherodon caroli (Holly, 1930)

Synonyms
- Tilapia caroli Holly, 1930

= Fissi =

Species of fish

The fissi (Sarotherodon caroli) is a species of cichlid endemic to Lake Barombi Mbo in western Cameroon. This species can reach a length of 18.6 centimetres (7.3 in) SL. It is threatened because of pollution and sedimentation due to human activities. It is potentially also threatened by large emissions of carbon dioxide (CO_{2}) from the lake's bottom (compare Lake Nyos), although studies indicate that Barombo Mbo lacks excess amounts of this gas.

Adults mainly feed on phytoplankton.
