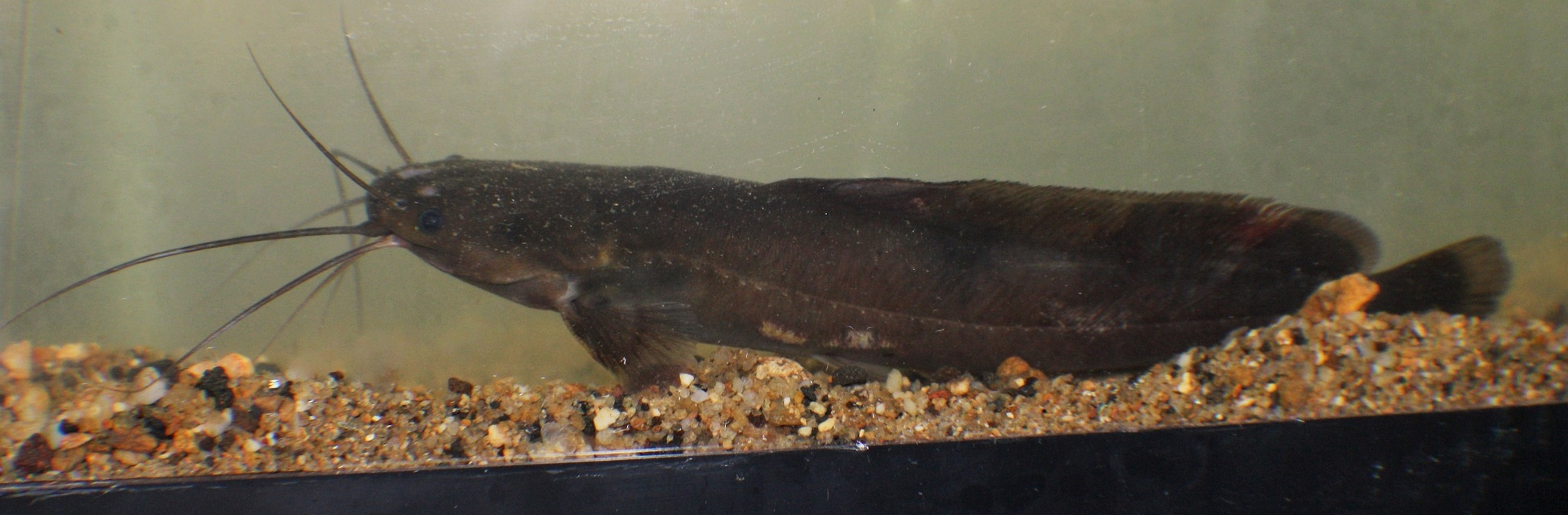

Conservation status
- Critically Endangered (IUCN 3.1)

Scientific classification
- Kingdom: Animalia
- Phylum: Chordata
- Class: Actinopterygii
- Order: Siluriformes
- Family: Clariidae
- Genus: Clarias
- Species: C. maclareni

Binomial name
- Clarias maclareni Trewavas, 1962

= Clarias maclareni =

Species of fish

Clarias maclareni is a critically endangered species of catfish in the family Clariidae. It is endemic to Lake Barombi Mbo in western Cameroon. It is currently threatened because of pollution and sedimentation due to human activities, and potentially also by large emissions of carbon dioxide (CO_{2}) from the lake's bottom (compare Lake Nyos). It is known to grow to 36 centimetres (14 in) TL. Large individuals feed mainly on other fishes (especially cichlids), while smaller individuals mainly feed on insects.

Named in memory Peter Ian Rupert MacLaren (ca. 1919-1956), who used his position as Fisheries Development Officer of Nigeria to collect fishes for the British Museum, including type specimen of this catfish (from Cameroon) in 1948 (he died from wounds inflicted by a crocodile in what is now Zambia).
