= Tristramella magdelainae =

Conservation status
- Extinct (1950s) (IUCN 3.1)

Scientific classification
- Kingdom: Animalia
- Phylum: Chordata
- Class: Actinopterygii
- Order: Cichliformes
- Family: Cichlidae
- Genus: Tristramella
- Species: †T. magdelainae

Binomial name
- †Tristramella magdelainae (Lortet, 1883)

Extinct species of fish

Tristramella magdelainae is an extinct species of cichlid fish. It was endemic to the vicinity of Damascus in Syria. It was last recorded in the 1950s, has not been recorded since and is presumed extinct. Drought, pollution and water extraction may have destroyed its habitat. This taxon is considered to be a subspecies of T. simonis in FishBase and considered a synonym of T. simonis by Catalog of Fishes, a view that FishBase now (2018) concurs with. This species reached a standard length of 13 cm (5.1 in).
