= Dikume =

Conservation status
- Critically Endangered (IUCN 3.1)

Scientific classification
- Kingdom: Animalia
- Phylum: Chordata
- Class: Actinopterygii
- Order: Cichliformes
- Family: Cichlidae
- Genus: Konia
- Species: K. dikume

Binomial name
- Konia dikume Trewavas, 1972

Species of fish

The dikume (Konia dikume) is a critically endangered species of fish in the family Cichlidae. It is endemic to Lake Barombi Mbo in western Cameroon.

== Description ==
The dikume is a silvery coloured fish with faint vertical barring. It grow to a maximum length of 11.2 cm. The most distinguishing feature of this species is that when freshly caught the capillaries swell with blood, particularly at the base of the fins, and oozes out to stain the fishes otherwise silvery skin.

== Distribution and habitat ==
It is endemic to Lake Barombi Mbo, a volcanic crater lake with a diameter of just 3 miles in western Cameroon where only the top 40 metres contains enough dissolved oxygen to sustain vertebrate life.

== Habits ==
The dikume is an invertebrate feeder which specialises in feeding on the larvae of the mosquito Chaoborus spp. To reach this food source the dikumbe must spend time in water that is so deep that it is deoxygenated, the high levels of hemoglobin in its blood are an adaptation that allow it to store oxygen so that it can visit the deeper, deoxygenated parts of the lake. Like the other cichlids endemic to Lake Barombi Mbo the dikume is a mouthbrooder.

== Threats ==
It is threatened because of pollution and sedimentation due to human activities. It is potentially also threatened by large emissions of carbon dioxide (CO_{2}) from the lake's bottom (compare Lake Nyos), although studies indicate that Barombo Mbo lacks excess amounts of this gas. As well as water abstraction to supply the growing town of Kumba and the introduction of non-native species. However, at the moment, there are no introduced fish species on Lake Barombi Mbo and commercial fishing is banned.

== Taxonomy ==
Lake Barombi Mbo is home to a "species flock" of cichlids with fourteen species, of which twelve are endemic. They all appear to be descended from a common tilapia-like ancestor and the dikume is one of the more specialised of them.
