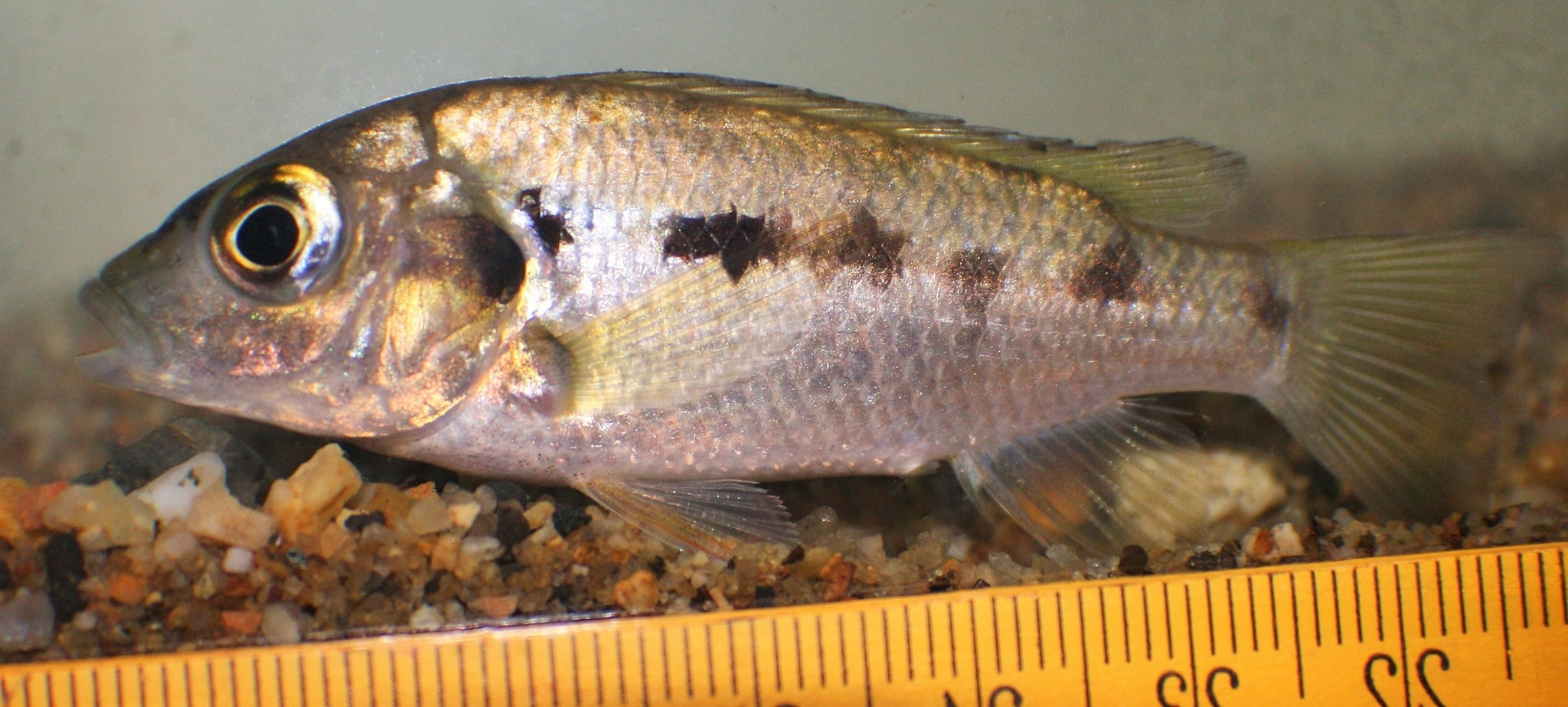
- Konia eisentrauti

Scientific classification
- Domain: Eukaryota
- Kingdom: Animalia
- Phylum: Chordata
- Class: Actinopterygii
- Order: Cichliformes
- Family: Cichlidae
- Subfamily: Pseudocrenilabrinae
- Tribe: Oreochromini
- Genus: Konia; Trewavas, 1972

Type species
- Tilapia eisentrauti Trewavas, 1962

= Konia (fish) =

Genus of fishes

Konia is a small genus of critically endangered cichlids endemic to Lake Barombi Mbo in western Cameroon. Although generally recognized as distinct, the genus is very close to Sarotherodon. The Konia species are threatened because of pollution and sedimentation due to human activities. They are potentially also threatened by large emissions of carbon dioxide (CO_{2}) from the lake's bottom (compare Lake Nyos), although studies indicate that Barombo Mbo lacks excess amounts of this gas. Myaka, Pungu and Stomatepia are three other equally threatened genera of cichlids that also are endemic to Lake Barombi Mbo.

== Species ==
There are currently two recognized species in this genus:

- Konia dikume Trewavas, 1972 (Dikume)
- Konia eisentrauti (Trewavas, 1962) (Konye)
