= Kululu =

Conservation status
- Critically Endangered (IUCN 3.1)

Scientific classification
- Kingdom: Animalia
- Phylum: Chordata
- Class: Actinopterygii
- Division: Teleostei
- Order: Cichliformes
- Family: Cichlidae
- Genus: Sarotherodon
- Species: S. steinbachi

Binomial name
- Sarotherodon steinbachi (Trewavas, 1962)

Synonyms
- Tilapia steinbachi Trewavas, 1962

Species of fish

The kululu (Sarotherodon steinbachi) e.g. Vikululu - Nikululu - Akululu - Bokululu - Hekululu is a species of cichlid endemic to Lake Barombi Mbo in western Cameroon. This species can reach a length of 11.3 centimetres (4.4 in) SL. It is threatened because of pollution and sedimentation due to human activities. It is potentially also threatened by large emissions of carbon dioxide (CO_{2}) from the lake's bottom (compare Lake Nyos), although studies indicate that Barombo Mbo lacks excess amounts of this gas.

It feeds on tiny organisms such as rotifers, diatoms and sponge spicules, and organic debris.

The specific name honours the entomologist Gerhard Steinbach (1923-2016) of the Humboldt University of Berlin who was a member of an expedition which was led by zoologist Martin Eisentraut on which the type of this cichlid was collected.
