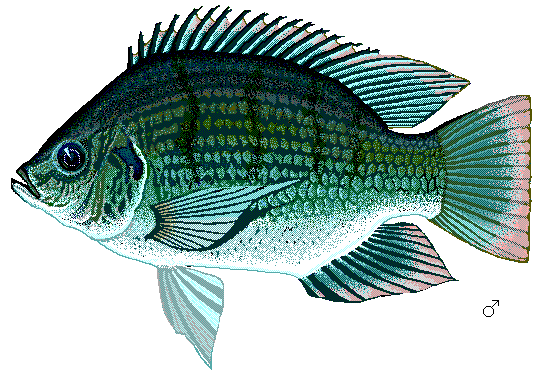

Conservation status
- Least Concern (IUCN 3.1)

Scientific classification
- Kingdom: Animalia
- Phylum: Chordata
- Class: Actinopterygii
- Division: Teleostei
- Order: Cichliformes
- Family: Cichlidae
- Genus: Sarotherodon
- Species: S. galilaeus

Binomial name
- Sarotherodon galilaeus (Linnaeus, 1758)

Synonyms
- Sparus galilaeus Linnaeus, 1758; Chromis galilaeus (Linnaeus, 1758); Sarotherodon galilaeum (Linnaeus, 1758); Tilapia galilaea (Linnaeus, 1758); Tilapia galilaea galilaea (Linnaeus, 1758); Tilapia pleuromelas A. H. A. Duméril, 1861; Chromis pleuromelas (A. H. A. Duméril, 1861); Tilapia galilaea pleuromelas A. H. A. Duméril, 1861; Tilapia lateralis A. H. A. Duméril, 1861; Chromis lateralis (A. H. A. Duméril, 1861); Tilapia macrocentra A. H. A. Duméril, 1861; Chromis tiberiadis Lortet, 1883; Chromis microstomus Lortet, 1883; Tilapia microstoma (Lortet, 1883); Chromis multifasciatus Günther, 1903; Sarotherodon multifasciatus (Günther, 1903); Tilapia galilaea multifasciata (Günther, 1903); Tilapia multifasciatus (Günther, 1903); Tilapia boulengeri Pellegrin, 1903; Tilapia galilaea boulengeri Pellegrin, 1903; Tilapia borkuana Pellegrin, 1919; Tilapia galilaea borkuana Pellegrin, 1919; Tilapia sanagaensis Thys van den Audenaerde, 1966; Sarotherodon sanagaensis (Thys van den Audenaerde, 1966)

= Mango tilapia =

Species of fish

The mango tilapia (Sarotherodon galilaeus) is a species of fish from the cichlid family that is native to fresh and brackish waters in Africa and the Levant. Other common names include Galilaea tilapia, Galilean comb, Galilee St. Peter's fish, and St. Peter's fish. (To differentiate from other Israeli species of "St. Peter's fish" see below.) This is a relatively large cichlid at up to 41 centimetres (16 in) in total length and about 1.6 kilograms (3.5 lb) in weight. It is very important to local fisheries and the species is also aquacultured.

In addition to the nominate subspecies, four subspecies are recognised. These are:

- Sarotherodon galilaeus borkuanus in Chad
- Sarotherodon galilaeus boulengeri
- Sarotherodon galilaeus multifasciatus in Burkina Faso, Côte d'Ivoire and Ghana
- Sarotherodon galilaeus sanagaensis

It is a mouthbrooder. The mating strategies can vary. Both uni-parent and bi-parent mouthbrooding is used, and monogamous or polygamous behaviour.

== Distribution and habitat ==
This widespread species is found in lakes, rivers and other fresh or brackish habitats in northern and central Africa (including Saharan oases), ranging as far south as the Guinea region, the Congo River Basin, Lake Albert and Lake Turkana. Outside Africa it is found in Syria, Jordan, Lebanon and Israel. It is one of the very few cichlids that is found in Africa north of the Sahara and in Asia. The typical temperature range is 22–28 °C (72–82 °F), but it has been recorded from waters as cold as 9 °C (48 °F).

== Behavior ==
=== Mating ===
Mating is usually monogamous for the mango tilapia. The male and female will create a depression in the substrate, in which the female will lay her eggs. Afterwards, the male will glide over the depression and fertilize the eggs. Mouth brooding is a tactic which, either male or female or both male and female, protects and carries the eggs in their mouth for a time period of about two weeks. However, pair bonding ends after mouth brooding begins.

==== Male mate choice ====
An experiment studying mate choice in the mango tilapia shows results of the correlation between operational sex ratio, characteristics of the body and pairing. In this study, the fish were exposed to different OSR's (more males, more females, or an equal ratio). Pair bonding was formed quicker between larger fish, and there was a long delay in pairing for the most abundant sex in the OSR. In addition, this study showed that mango tilapia that mate within a similar size group have greater reproductive success.

==== Male mating style flexibility and parental care ====
There is flexibility for male mango tilapia in their mating styles. During spawning, males can adapt the mating style of territoriality or non territoriality. Also, males can adapt other mating styles, like brooding participating or non participating in egg brooding and pairing or not pair bonding with the selected female. In addition to the multiple mating styles, the males show that they are able to select alternate reproductive styles (ARS), which are combinations of the mating styles that are mentioned above. Territoriality males were the most dominant group (which deserted the female after mating), but male reproductive behavior changes between different reproductive cycles. These mating styles are also important factors in parental care. There are many levels of parental care in mango tilapia: uniparental and biparental parental care (male, female or both parents can all exist in one population).

For the mango tilapia, parental care is important for the survival of the offspring. Parents who shared the job of incubation had double the reproductive success of other parents who did the job alone. Rather, for uniparental parental care, the parent's reproductive success for each brood was 20% higher. In terms of the relationship between caring strategies and clutch size, either parent is equally capable of caring for its offspring (both capable of taking care of the same number of eggs and fry). Levels of parental care in mango tilapia depend on the costs and benefits of staying versus departing. Some costs of both males and females were the growth and prolonged time until the next time they reproduce. In addition, parental care decreased a female's future ability to reproduce (fecundity). This is plausible since a body weight increase increases fecundity. Female mango tilapia have high parental care costs, which can be thought to be separated in two parts: egg production cost and parental care cost. In experiments studying parents deserting their children, deserting was more frequent in males and females when there were higher parental care costs and males deserting was more frequent when there was a reduced benefits from parental care.

== Local names ==
=== Israel ===
The Israel Mango tilapia is known there also as "Galilee St. Peter's fish", in Arabic مشط أبيض musht 'abyad, which is white and larger than the "Common St. Peter's fish" (Tilapia zillii, مشط musht in Arabic and adopted into Modern Hebrew, lit. "comb"). Another "St. Peter's fish" is the "Jordan St. Peter's fish" (Oreochromis aureus), which was traditionally coming down the Jordan River from Lake Huleh to the Sea of Galilee and is black and also larger than the white "Common St. Peter's fish".
