= Kónya =

Kónya can be both a masculine given name and a surname. Notable people with the name include:

== Given name ==
- Kónya Szécsényi, Hungarian baron

== Surname ==
- Ádám Kónya (born 1992), Hungarian cross-country skier
- Ákos Kónya (born 1974), Hungarian ultramarathon runner
- Albert Kónya (1917–1988), Hungarian physicist and politician
- Ferenc Kónya (1892–1977), Hungarian football player and coach
- Imre Kónya (born 1947), Hungarian politician and lawyer
- Kalman Konya (born 1961), Hungarian and West German shot putter
- László Kónya (born 1979), Hungarian footballer
- Péter Kónya (born 1969), Hungarian soldier and politician
- Sándor Kónya (1923–2002), Hungarian tenor
- Zsófia Kónya (born 1995), Hungarian short track speed skater
