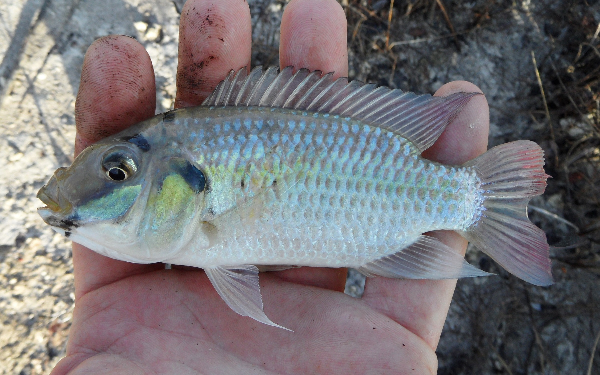

Conservation status
- Least Concern (IUCN 3.1)

Scientific classification
- Kingdom: Animalia
- Phylum: Chordata
- Class: Actinopterygii
- Order: Cichliformes
- Family: Cichlidae
- Genus: Sarotherodon
- Species: S. melanotheron

Binomial name
- Sarotherodon melanotheron (Rüppell, 1852)

Synonyms
- Tilapia melanotheron (Rüppell, 1852); Tilapia heudelotii Duméril, 1861; Chromis heudelotii (Duméril, 1861); Tilapia rangii Duméril, 1861; Chromis macrocephalus Bleeker, 1862; Tilapia macrocephala (Bleeker, 1862); Chromis microcephalus Günther, 1862; Tilapia microcephala (Günther, 1862); Melanogenes macrocephalus Bleeker, 1863; Melanogenes microcephalus Bleeker, 1863; Tilapia leonensis Thys van den Audenaerde, 1971

= Blackchin tilapia =

Species of ray-finned fish

The blackchin tilapia (Sarotherodon melanotheron), formerly Tilapia melanotheron, T. heudelotii and T. leonensis, is a species of cichlid native to coastal west Africa. It is a paternal mouthbrooder which has been introduced to Asia and North America.

In the Philippines, it is also informally called gloria or tilapiang arroyo after former Philippine President Gloria Macapagal-Arroyo because of its small size and mole-like dark pigmentation under its lower jaw, resembling that of the short stature and mole on the former president's left cheek.

== Description ==
The blackchin tilapia, is pale in colour, that colour varying in shades including light blue, orange and golden yellow which normally has dark patches on the chin of adults. It also normally has dark colouration on the posterior edge of the gill and on the tips of the soft rays of the dorsal fin. The body is typically marked with irregular bars, spots or splotches. It has a small mouth which is equipped with as many as a few hundred tiny teeth which are arranged in 3–6 rows. They display minimal sexual dimorphism with the heads of adult males usually being slightly larger than the heads of females, some males may also show gold tinting on the operculum. The dorsal fin has 15–17 spines and 10–12 soft rays, the anal fin has 3 spines and 8–10 soft rays and the length of caudal peduncle is equal to 0.6–0.9 times its depth. It can grow to a maximum length of 28 centimetres (11 in) but more normally attains 17.5 centimetres (6.9 in).

== Distribution ==
The blackchin tilapia is native to western Africa from Mauritania to Cameroon. It has been introduced to several countries in Asia, USA and Europe. It has also become an invasive species in Florida, Thailand, and the Philippines.

== Habitat and biology ==
The blackchin tilapia is able to tolerate high salinities and it can be found abundantly in mangrove areas and is able to move into freshwaters, such as the lower reaches of streams, and in to salt waters. In West Africa, it is restricted to brackish lagoons and estuaries, and is abundant in the mangroves. It forms schools and it is largely nocturnal, although it will feed during the day infrequently. The diet is largely aufwuchs and detritus supplemented with bivalves and zooplankton It feeds by picking up and swallowing in bites, it lacks gill rakers.

Spawning occurs close to the shore in shallow water. The female actively courts the male, digs pits and leads in mating. The male eventually reacts in a largely passive manner and the pair will establish a bond. It is paternal mouth brooder, but females of one of the strains in Ghana also exhibit the potential for oral-brooding.

== Invasive species ==
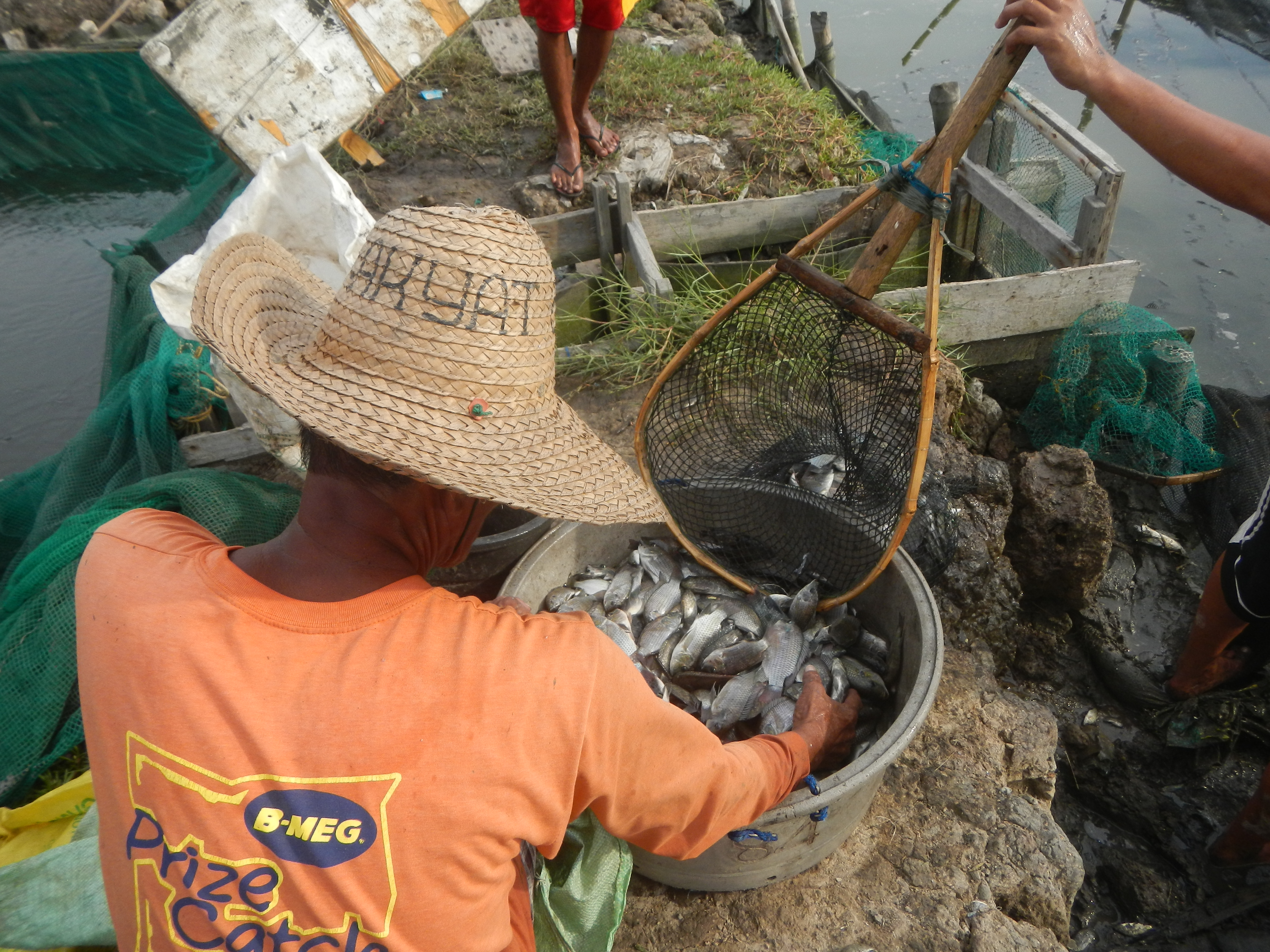
Harvesting blackchin tilapia in the Philippines

In Florida, this species appears to have been introduced via escapes from the aquarium trade, although some deliberate releases are suspected. In some areas Blackchin tilapia can make up to 90% of the fish biomass. They can then spread disease to and out compete native fish. In Hawaii it is sometimes called the "saltwater tilapia" because it has the ability to survive and possibly even breed in pure seawater. In these islands it is found off sheltered beaches and in lagoons around O`ahu and possibly the other islands. This species is regarded as a pest in canals and reservoirs in Hawaii, they breed rapidly, out-compete any other species present, and then they frequently have massive die-offs. For example, in 1991 at Lake Wilson on O`ahu, there was a fungal infection which killed off an estimated 20,000 tilapia, the majority of which were blackchin tilapia. This was thought to represent at most 0.5% of the total population of tilapia in the reservoir.

In the Philippines, there is no record on how the blackchin tilapia was introduced into the country's waters, but it is believed that around as early as 2015, it may have come from the aquarium trade and released into the wild in the waters near provinces of Bataan and Bulacan. The species is considered a threat towards fish ponds as they multiply very quickly, taking up space for other fish, particularly those for breeding bangus (milkfish). Given the nearby proximity to Bataan and Bulacan, blackchin tilapia is also present in Manila Bay, despite not being a freshwater body as it was among the fish that had washed ashore along the Baseco shoreline on September 17, 2020.

In Thailand, blackchin tilapia were first imported from Ghana by CP Foods for experiment with raising in 2010, licensed by the Department of Fisheries, but the project was not successful. Although a report had been submitted to the Department of Fisheries regarding the destruction, in 2012, the Department of Fisheries received the first report of the spread in Yisan subdistrict, Amphawa district, Samut Songkhram province.

In 2023, blackchin tilapia was a prohibited species from being imported into the country, and the species was found spreading in many areas in the central region especially the provinces of Samut Sakhon, Samut Songkhram, Samut Prakan, and there have been reports of the species' distribution as far as Chumphon province in the south.

As of 2024, blackchin tilapias are considered a national agenda because serious outbreaks have been found in more and more regions, causing damage to many fish and shrimp farmers. The Thai government has announced that they will be completely eliminated, one of the limiting measures is releasing predator fish such as barramundi into the wild to control the population. It has been reported that they are able to adapt to living in salty waters on the coast or in estuaries. There was an outbreak near Laem Mae Phim Beach, Rayong province, as well as Songkhla Lake in Songkhla province, where a habitat to many endemic and endangered species. There was also an invasion of water sources into the suburb and central Bangkok, capital of Thailand.

== Taxonomy ==
The black chin tilapia was formerly considered to be subdivided into three subspecies but some authorities now consider it to be a monotypic species:

The three subspecies were:

- S.m. heudelotii (Duméril, 1861)
- S.m. leonensis (Thys van den Audenaerde, 1971) Liberia and Sierra Leone
- S.m. melanotheron Rüppell, 1852 Côte d'Ivoire to southern Cameroon.

== Human use ==
The blackchin tilapia is harvested for human consumption and is bred and collected for the aquarium trade.
