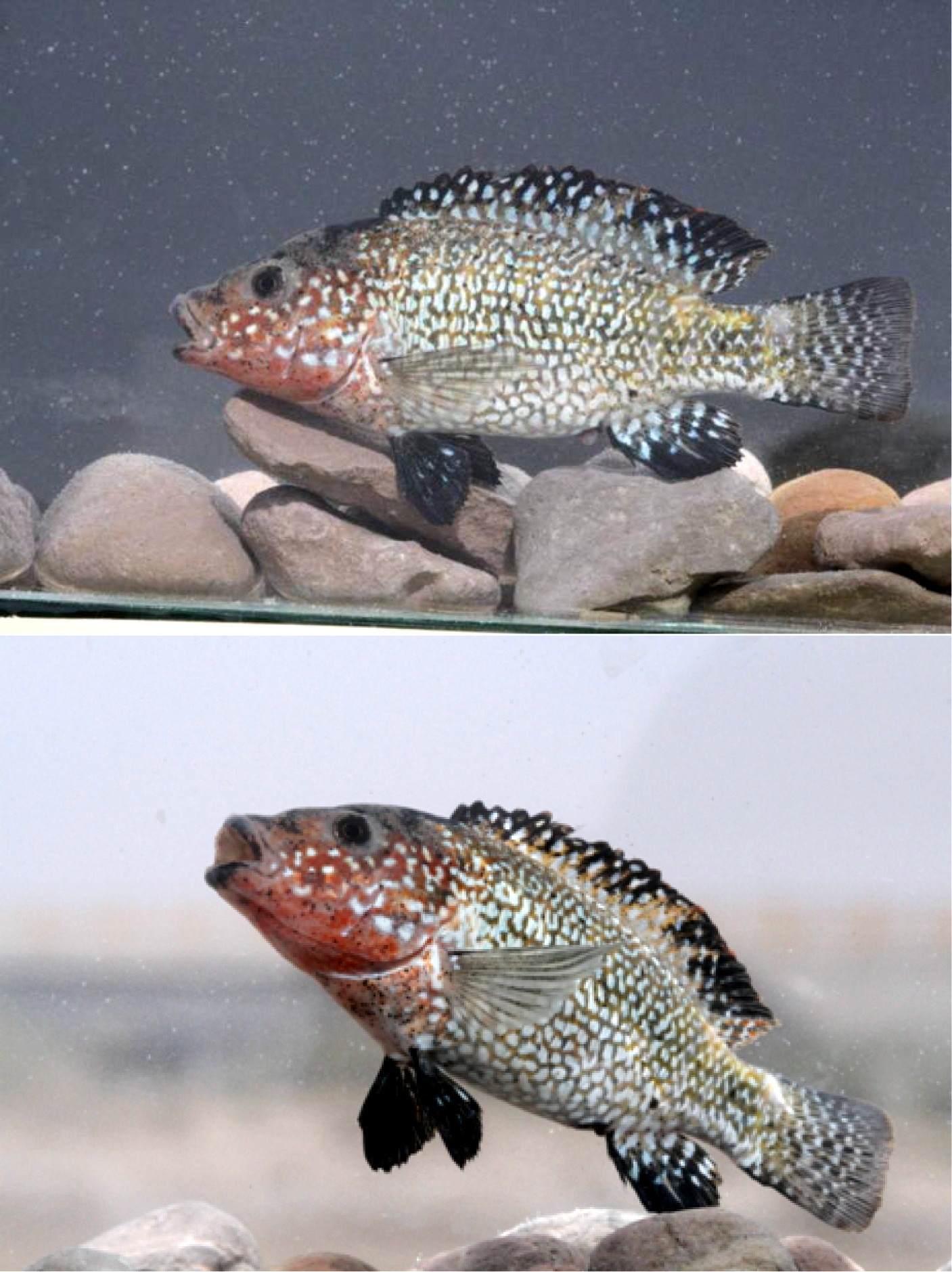
- Iranocichla persa

Scientific classification
- Kingdom: Animalia
- Phylum: Chordata
- Class: Actinopterygii
- Order: Cichliformes
- Family: Cichlidae
- Tribe: Oreochromini
- Genus: Iranocichla; Coad, 1982

Type species
- Iranocichla hormuzensis Coad, 1982

= Iranocichla =

Genus of fishes

Iranocichla is a genus of fish in the family Cichlidae found in fresh and brackish waters in southern Iran. They are the only cichlids native to this country.

== Species ==
There are currently two described species in this genus, but a third population of unclear affinities is known from the Kol River drainage (between the range of the two recognized species):

- Iranocichla hormuzensis Coad, 1982
- Iranocichla persa Esmaeili, Sayyadzadeh & Seehausen, 2016
