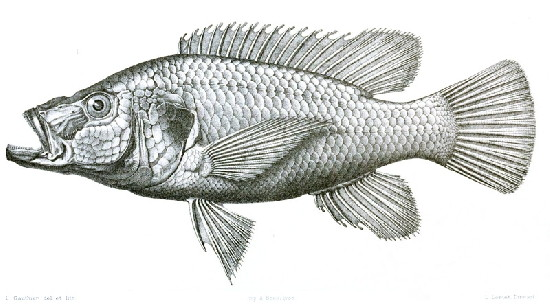

Conservation status
- Extinct (2014) (IUCN 3.1)

Scientific classification
- Kingdom: Animalia
- Phylum: Chordata
- Class: Actinopterygii
- Order: Cichliformes
- Family: Cichlidae
- Genus: Tristramella
- Species: †T. sacra

Binomial name
- †Tristramella sacra (Günther, 1865)

Synonyms
- Hemichromis sacra Günther, 1865; Parachromis sacra (Günther, 1865); Paratilapia sacra (Günther, 1865); Chromis paterfamilias Lortet, 1876

= Tristramella sacra =

Long jaw tristamella

Species of fish

Tristramella sacra, the long jaw tristramella, is a species of cichlid fish that was endemic to the Sea of Galilee in Israel. It has not been recorded since 1990, despite searches both of the lake and in local markets, and it is regarded as extinct by the IUCN. This species could reach a total length of up to 28 cm (11 in). The long jaw tristamella has not been seen since 1990 and declared extinct by the IUCN in 2014.

T. sacra's spawning ground was the marshy northern margin of the lake. This dried out in 1991 and again in the mid-1990s, destroying this species' breeding habitat and therefore possibly causing its disappearance.

Water levels in the Sea of Galilee may have been under stress since Israel's National Water Carrier was built in 1964, and this stress may have been increased since the Israel–Jordan peace treaty of 1994 committed Israel to supply 50 million cubic meters of water per year from the lake to Jordan.

== See also ==
- Wildlife of Israel
