= Lake Barombi Mbo =

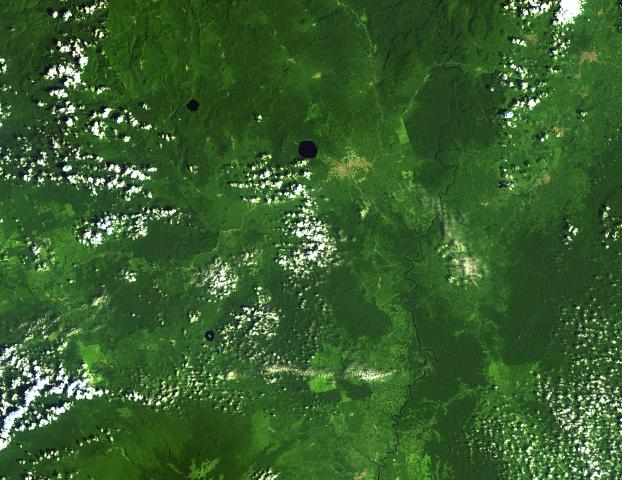
- Satellite photo from NASA. Barombi Mbo is the largest circular lake, just above center.

- Location within Cameroon Location within Africa
- Coordinates: 4°39′41″N 9°24′9″E
- Type: Volcanic crater lake
- Primary outflows: Mungo River
- Basin countries: Cameroon
- Max. length: 2.15 km (1.34 mi) (diameter)
- Surface area: 5 km^{2} (1.9 mi^{2}) or 7 km^{2} (2.7 mi^{2})
- Average depth: 69 m (226 ft)
- Max. depth: 111 m (364 ft)
- Surface elevation: 300 m (980 ft)

Ramsar Wetland
- Official name: Barombi Mbo Crater Lake
- Designated: 8 October 2006
- Reference no.: 1643

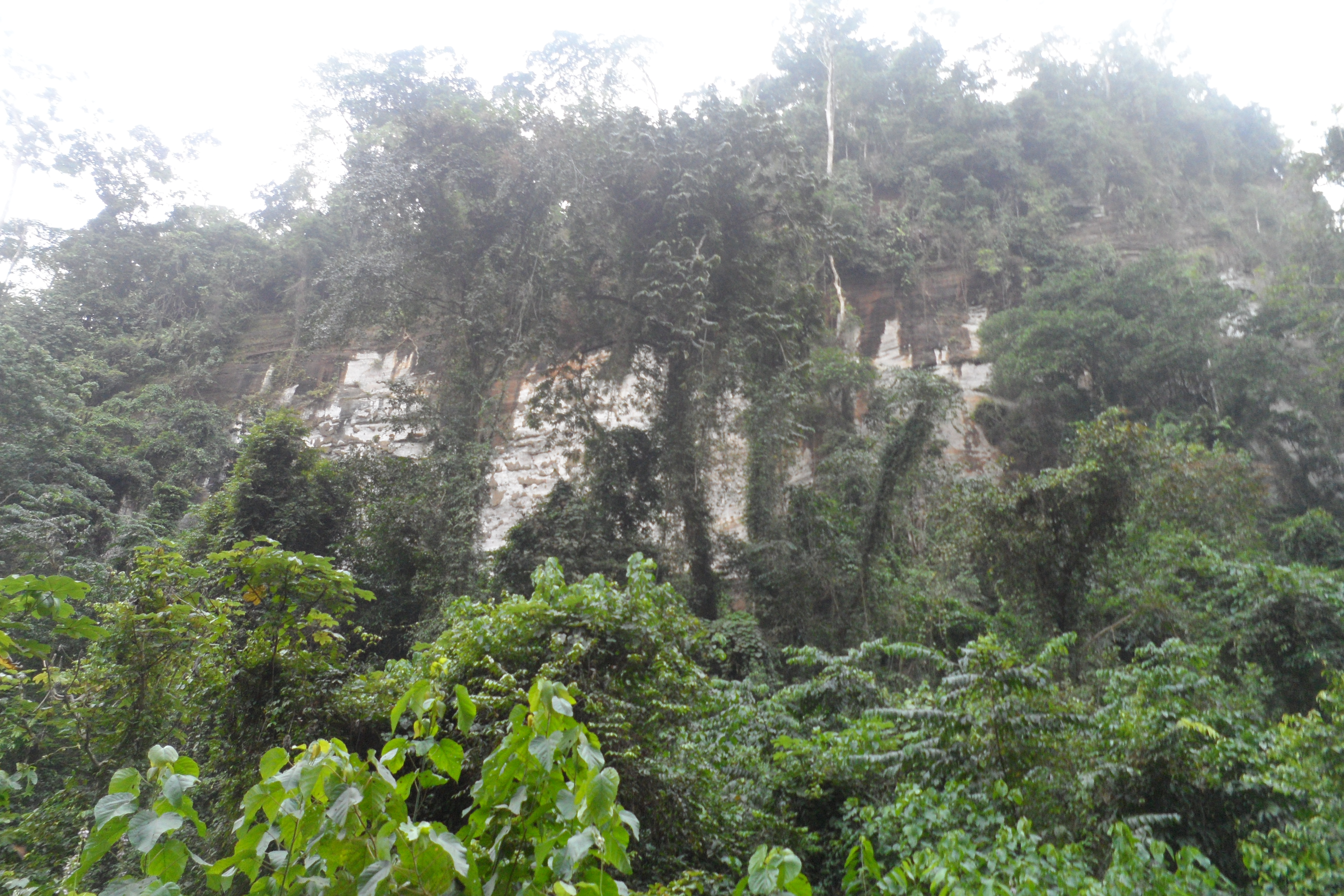
Bakundu Forest Reserve, Lake Barombi

Lake Barombi Mbo or Barombi-ma-Mbu is a lake near Kumba in the Southwest Region of Cameroon. It is located in the Cameroon volcanic chain, and is the largest volcanic lake in this region. It is one of the oldest radiocarbon-dated lakes in Africa, with the youngest lava flow in it being about one million years old. On old colonial maps the area was known as Elefanten Sea (Elephant Lake), but the elephants living in the area were extirpated due to ivory trading.

== Biology ==
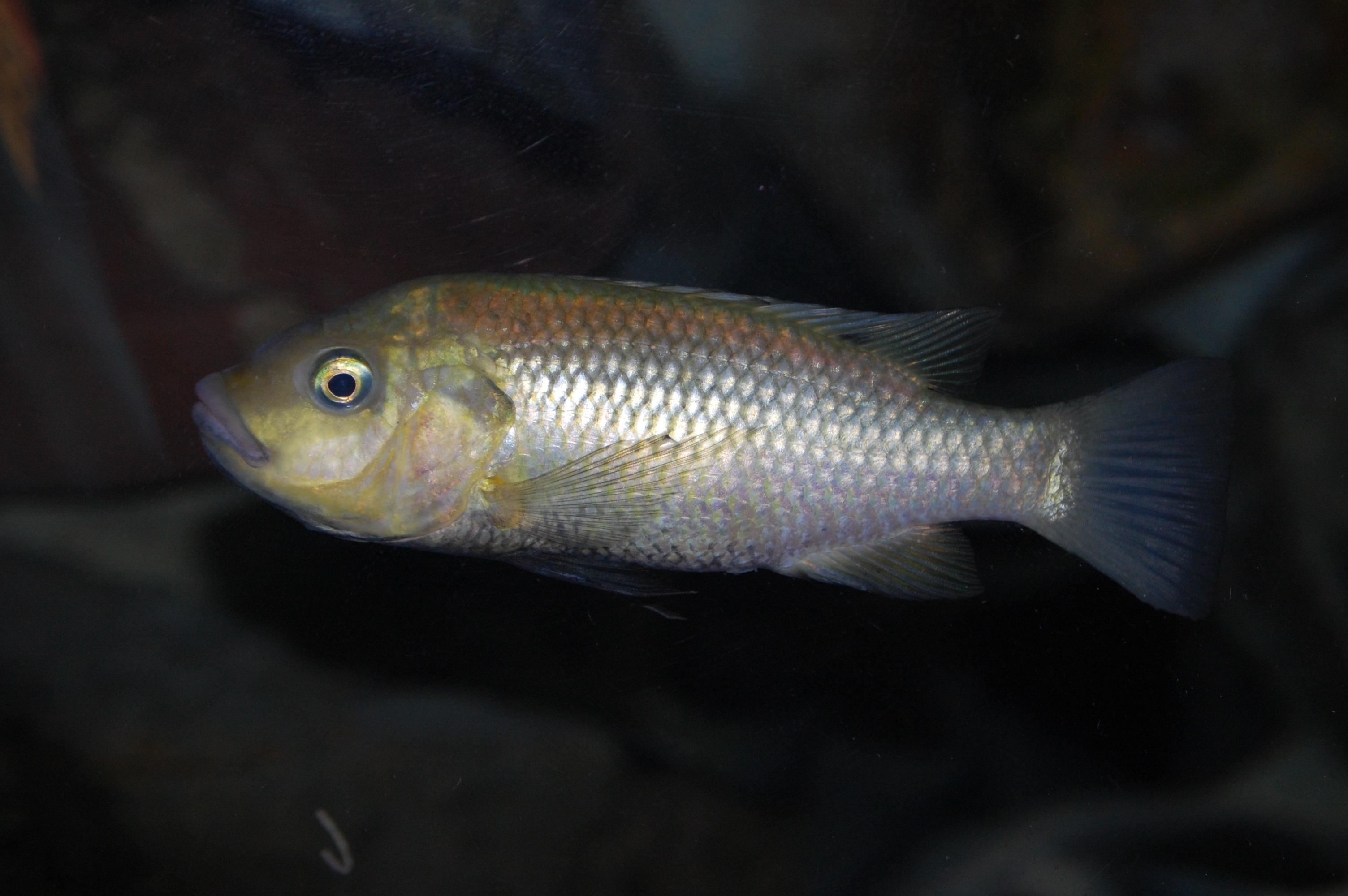

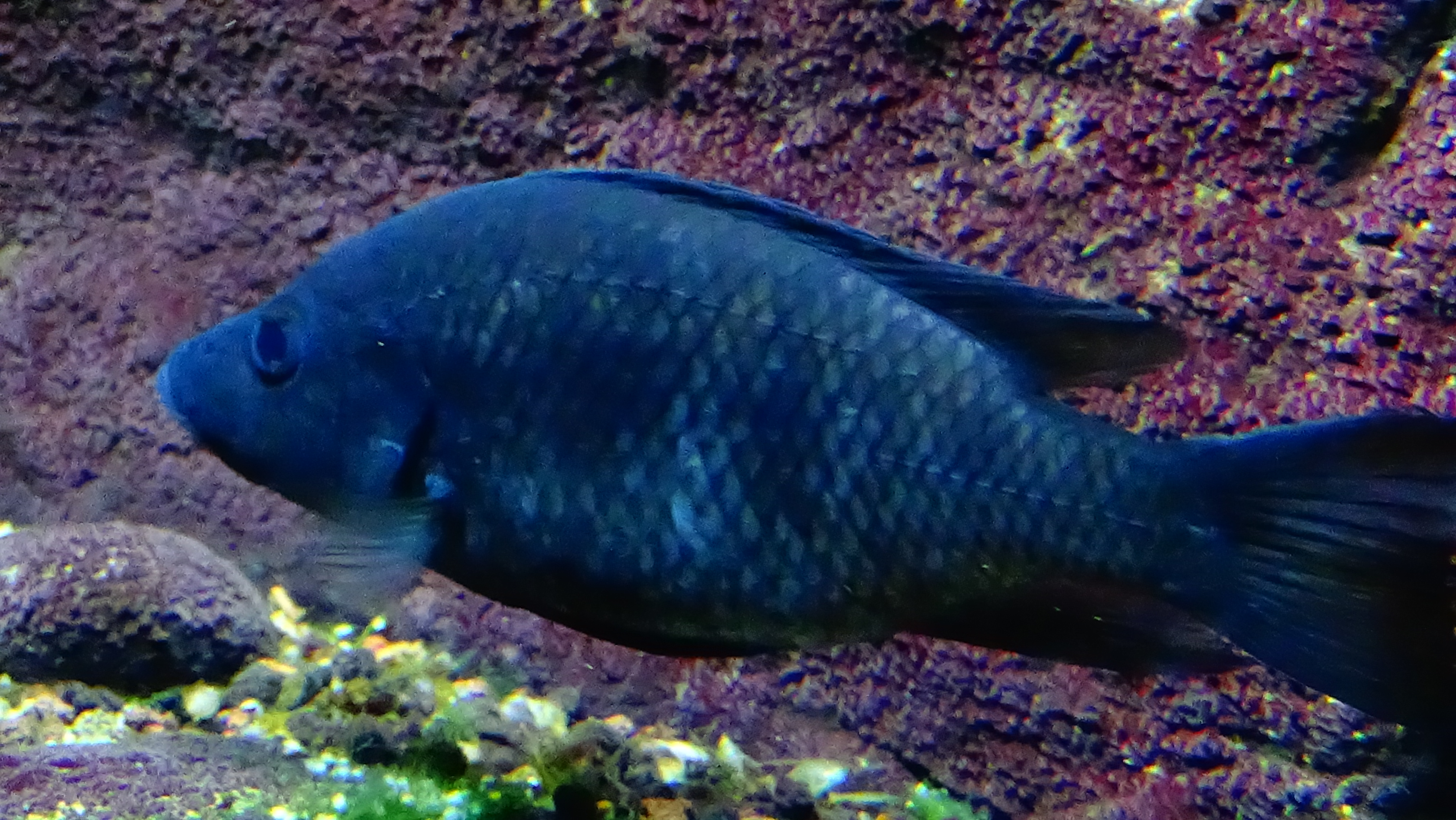
Sarotherodon linnellii (above) and Stomatepia pindu (below), two of the many cichlid species found only in Lake Barombi Mbo

Until now, 15 species of fishes have been recorded from the lake. Among others, this includes Labeobarbus batesii, a member of the Fundulopanchax mirabilis group, and the endemic catfish Clarias maclareni. Perhaps most noteworthy are the 11 species of cichlids that are endemic to the lake (Konia spp., Stomatepia spp., Myaka myaka, Pungu maclareni, Sarotherodon caroli, S. linnellii, S. lohbergeri, and S. steinbachi). These cichlids are commonly recognized as a prime example of sympatric speciation, but studies indicate that they were not the result of a single founding event. The lake is strongly stratified with essentially no oxygen deeper than 40 m (130 ft), meaning that fish are restricted to the upper parts closer to the surface. However, one of the cichlid species, Konia dikume, has an unusually high level of hemoglobin in its blood, allowing it to briefly enter low-oxygen water to feed on glassworms (Chaoborus). Other cichlid species in the lake include both generalist and specialist feeders. A highly unusual specialist is Pungu maclareni, which mainly feeds on the endemic sponge Corvospongilla thysi. All the Barombi Mbo cichlids are mouth brooders. In addition to the sponge, the lake is home to an endemic species of Caridina shrimp.

All the endemic fish are seriously threatened by pollution and sedimentation from human activities. They are potentially also threatened by large emissions of carbon dioxide (CO_{2}) from the lake's bottom (compare Lake Nyos), although studies indicate that Barombo Mbo lacks excess amounts of this gas. Commercial fishing is forbidden in the lake. Nevertheless, extensive subsistence fishing has caused declines in the Barombi Mbo cichlids, but it is shifting to more sustainable practices.

== Gallery ==
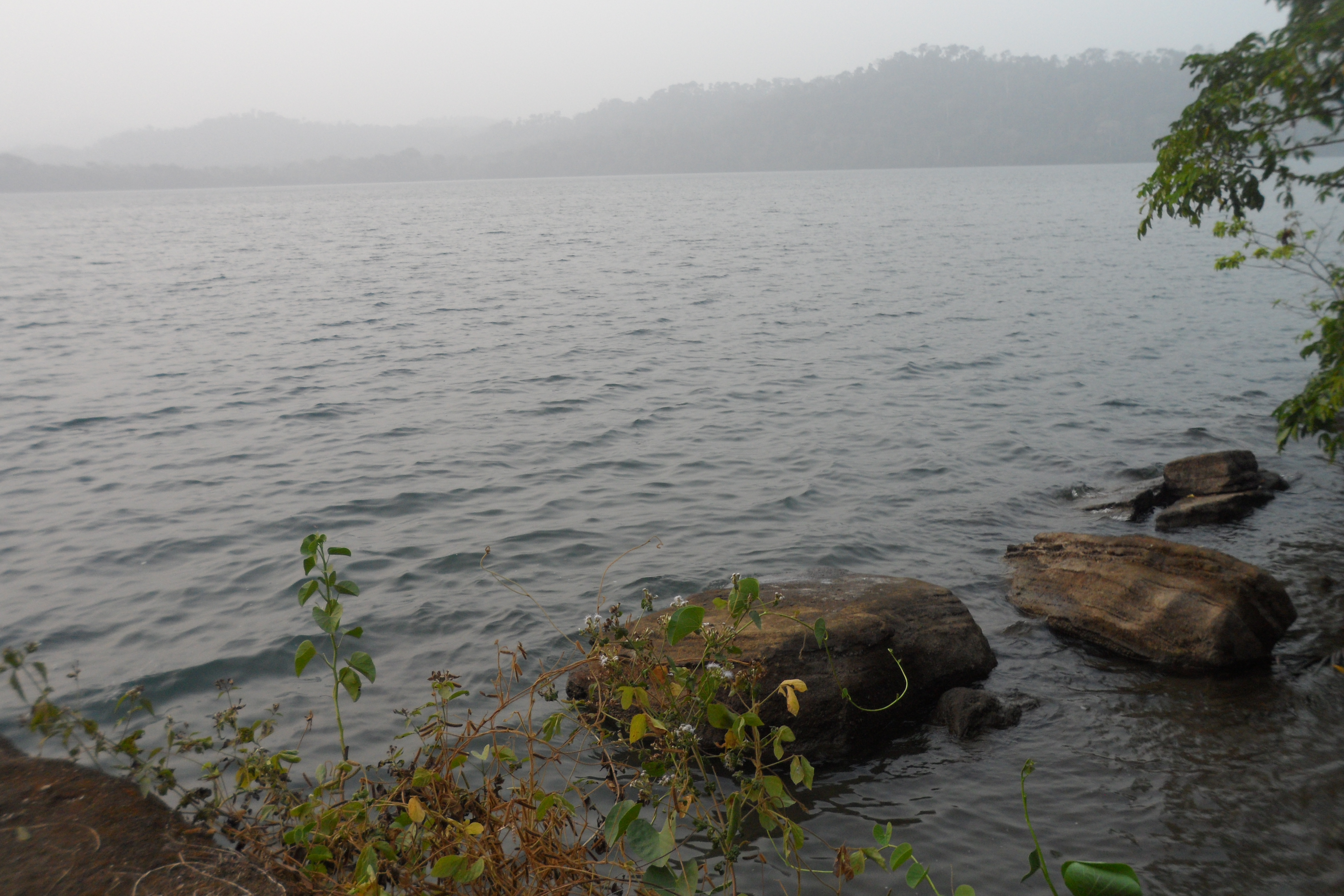
Lake Barombi, Crater Lake

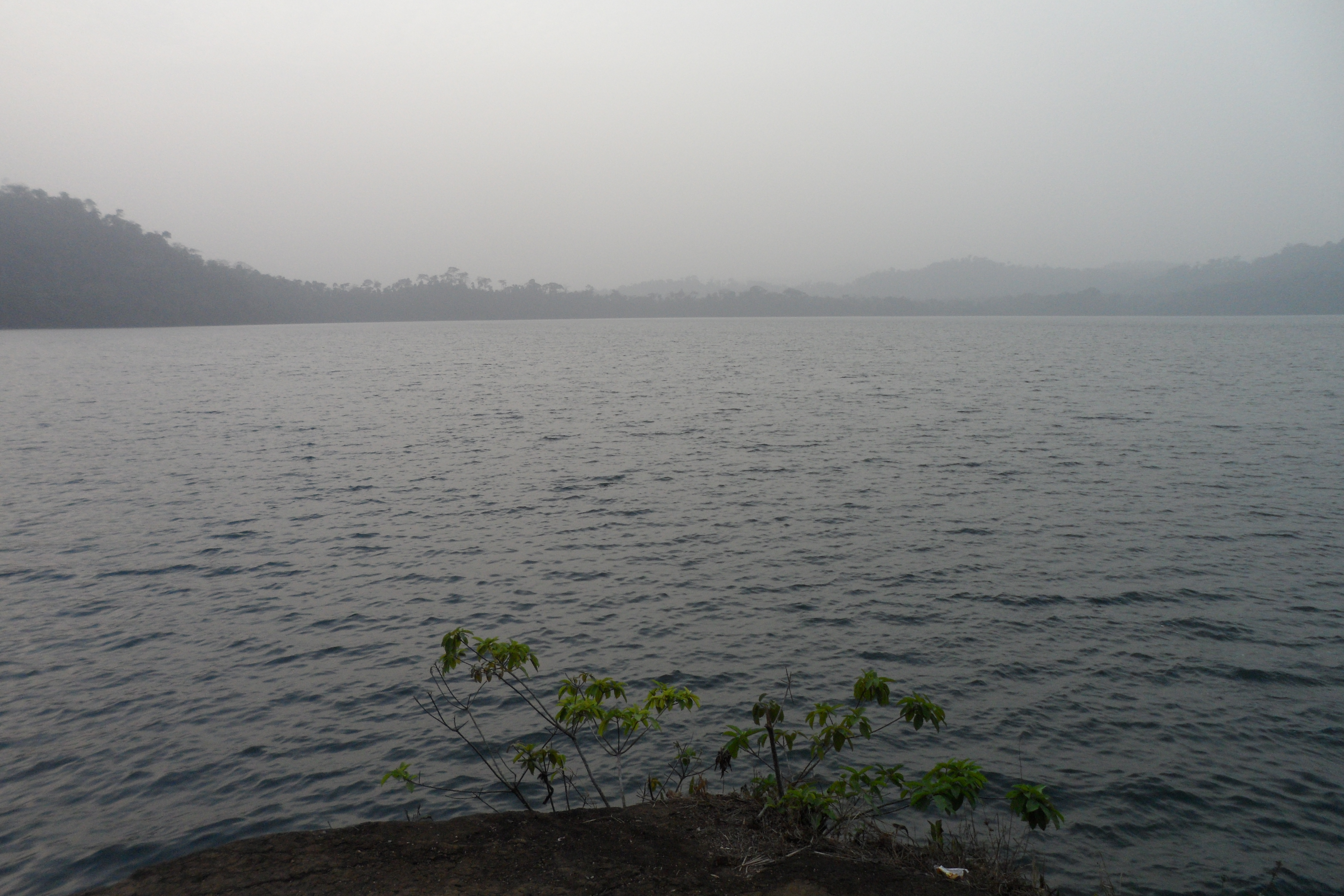
Full extent, Lake Barombi

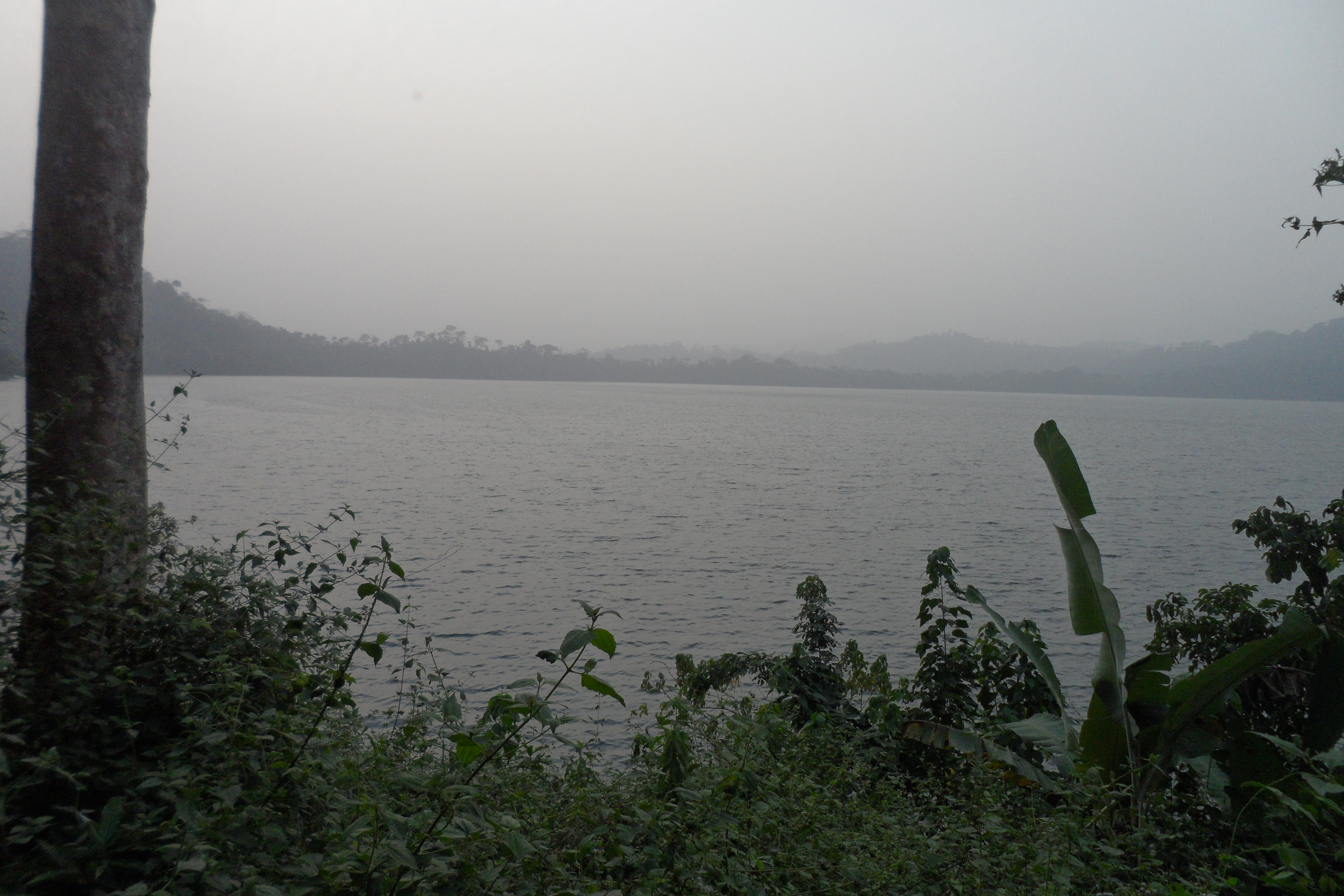
Side view of Lake Barombi, Kumba

== See also ==
- Lake Barombi Koto
- Lake Bermin
- Lake Dissoni
- Lake Ejagham
- Lake Oku
