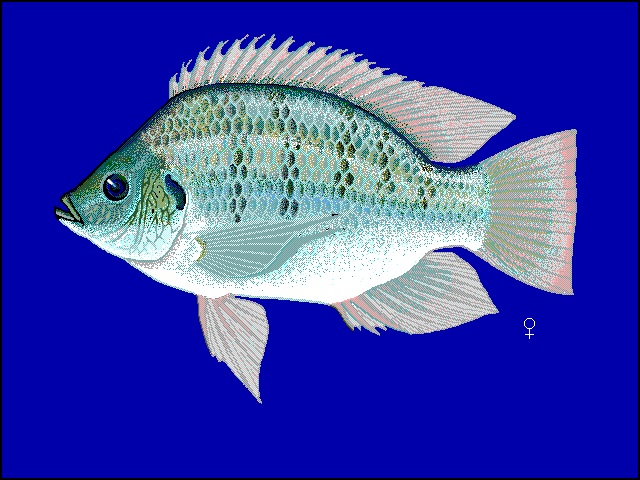
- Female mango tilapia (S. galilaeus galilaeus)

Scientific classification
- Kingdom: Animalia
- Phylum: Chordata
- Class: Actinopterygii
- Order: Cichliformes
- Family: Cichlidae
- Tribe: Oreochromini
- Genus: Sarotherodon; Rüppell, 1852

Type species
- Sarotherodon melanotheron Rüppell, 1852

= Sarotherodon =

Genus of fishes

Sarotherodon is a genus of oreochromine cichlids that are native to the northern half of Africa (south as far as the Congo River basin), with a single species, S. galilaeus, also ranging into the Levant. A couple of species from this genus have been introduced far outside their native range, and are important in aquaculture (S. galilaeus and to a lesser degree S. melanotheron). Most other species have small ranges and some are seriously threatened. They mainly inhabit fresh and brackish water, but a few can live in salt water (at least for a period). Species in this genus, as well as those in several other oreochromine and tilapiine genera, share the common name "tilapia" and historically they were included in the genus Tilapia.

Based on mtDNA sequence analysis, there seem to be several clades in this genus, and a few species of the much larger genus Oreochromis (such as Oreochromis urolepis and the blue tilapia O. aureus) seem closer to Sarotherodon according to the mtDNA data (see discussion at Wami tilapia). Research is hampered by the fact that hybridization runs rampant in these fishes, which confounds mtDNA data, and that the fast speed of evolution makes choice of appropriate nuclear DNA sequences difficult.

== Species ==
There are currently 13 recognized species in this genus:

- Sarotherodon caroli (Holly, 1930) (Fissi)
- Sarotherodon caudomarginatus (Boulenger, 1916)
- Sarotherodon galilaeus (Linnaeus, 1758)
  - Sarotherodon galilaeus borkuanus (Pellegrin, 1919)
  - Sarotherodon galilaeus boulengeri (Pellegrin, 1903)
  - Sarotherodon galilaeus galilaeus (Linnaeus, 1758) (Mango tilapia)
  - Sarotherodon galilaeus multifasciatus (Günther, 1903)
  - Sarotherodon galilaeus sanagaensis (Thys van den Audenaerde, 1966)
- Sarotherodon knauerae D. Neumann, Stiassny & Schliewen, 2011
- Sarotherodon lamprechti D. Neumann, Stiassny & Schliewen, 2011
- Sarotherodon linnellii (Lönnberg, 1903) (Blackfin tilapia)
- Sarotherodon lohbergeri (Holly, 1930) (Keppi)
- Sarotherodon melanotheron Rüppell, 1852
  - Sarotherodon melanotheron heudelotii (A. H. A. Duméril, 1861)
  - Sarotherodon melanotheron leonensis (Thys van den Audenaerde, 1971)
  - Sarotherodon melanotheron melanotheron Rüppell, 1852 (Blackchin tilapia)
- Sarotherodon mvogoi (Thys van den Audenaerde, 1965)
- Sarotherodon nigripinnis (Guichenot, 1861)
  - Sarotherodon nigripinnis dolloi (Boulenger, 1899)
  - Sarotherodon nigripinnis nigripinnis (Guichenot, 1861)
- Sarotherodon occidentalis (Daget, 1962)
- Sarotherodon steinbachi (Trewavas, 1962) (Kululu)
- Sarotherodon tournieri (Daget, 1965)
  - Sarotherodon tournieri liberiensis (Thys van den Audenaerde, 1971)
  - Sarotherodon tournieri tournieri (Daget, 1965)
