= Mouthbrooder =

Animal that cares for its offspring by holding them its mouth

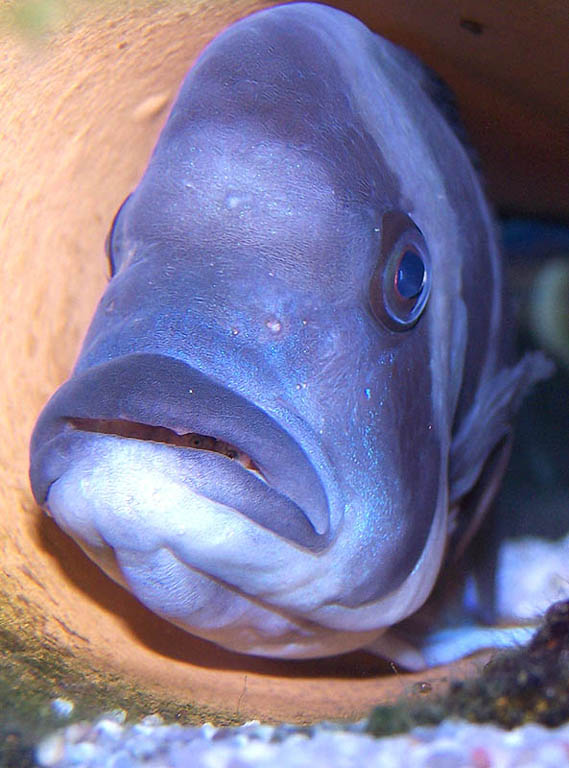
A female Cyphotilapia frontosa mouthbrooding fry which can be seen looking out from her mouth

Mouthbrooding, also known as oral incubation and buccal incubation, is the care given by some groups of animals to their offspring by holding them in the mouth of the parent for extended periods of time. Although mouthbrooding is performed by a variety of different animals, such as Darwin's frog, fish are by far the most diverse mouthbrooders. Mouthbrooding has evolved independently in several different families of fish.

== Mouthbrooding behaviour ==
Paternal mouthbrooders are species where the male looks after the eggs. Paternal mouthbrooders include the arowana, various mouthbrooding bettas and gouramies such as Betta pugnax, and sea catfish such as Ariopsis felis. Among cichlids, paternal mouthbrooding is relatively rare, but is found among some of the tilapiines, most notably the black-chin tilapia Sarotherodon melanotheron.

In the case of the maternal mouthbrooders, the female takes the eggs. Maternal mouthbrooders are found among both African and South American cichlids. African examples are the haplochromines, such as the mbuna, Astatotilapia burtoni, and the dwarf mouthbrooders Pseudocrenilabrus multicolor, and some of the tilapiines, such as Oreochromis mossambicus and Oreochromis niloticus. The South American maternal mouthbrooders are all members of the subfamily Geophaginae (commonly known as "eartheaters" on account of their substrate-sifting feeding mode) such as Gymnogeophagus balzanii and Geophagus steindachneri.

Biparental mouthbrooding occurs where both parents take some of the eggs. This is relatively rare, but is found among the cichlid genus Xenotilapia, and a single catfish, the spatula-barbled catfish (Phyllonemus typus).

Typically, after courtship, the male fertilises the eggs and then collects them in his mouth, holding onto them until they hatch. During this time he cannot feed. Among the maternal mouthbrooding cichlids, it is quite common (e.g., among the mbuna) for the male to fertilise the eggs only once they are in the female's mouth. Some cichlids are able to feed while mouthbrooding the eggs, but invariably they feed less often than they would otherwise do, and after mouthbrooding one batch of eggs, all mouthbrooding fish are underweight and require a period of time to feed and make up for the depletion of their energy reserves.

In all cases, the eggs are protected until they hatch and the fry become free swimming. Only in some cases does the parent extend protection to mobile juveniles. Among the cichlids and arowanas, extension of brood care to the fry is common, and they have behavioural cues to tell fry swimming and feeding away from the parent that danger is approaching and that they should return to their parent's mouth. By caring for their offspring in this way, mouthbrooding fish are able to produce smaller numbers of offspring with a higher chance of survival than species that offer no brood care.

== Aquaculture ==
Some commercially important fish are mouthbrooders, most notably among the tilapiines and arowanas. Fry harvesting, getting the brooding fish to open its mouth and release the fry, is important if the fry are to be reared artificially. In the case of endangered species, such as Asian arowana, harvesting may be supervised by an official to certify that the fish farm is a genuine producer of captive-bred fish.

== Brood parasites ==
Some fish have evolved to exploit the mouthbrooding behaviour of other species. Synodontis multipunctatus, also known as the cuckoo catfish, combines mouthbrooding with the behavior of a brood parasite: it eats the host mouthbrooder's eggs, while spawning and simultaneously laying and fertilizing its own eggs. The mouthbrooder (typically a cichlid) incubates the cuckoo catfish young, the catfish eggs hatch earlier than the cichlid's eggs, and the catfish eat the as-yet unhatched cichlid eggs before being set free.

== Families of mouthbrooding fish ==
Families of fish known to include mouthbrooding species include:

- Apogonidae (cardinalfish): All paternal mouthbrooders
- Ariidae (sea catfish): All paternal mouthbrooders
- Bagridae (Bagrid catfish): the only mouthbrooding species in the family is Bagrus meridionalis, which is a biparental mouthbrooder
- Cichlidae (cichlids): Numerous species are mouthbrooders, typically maternal mouthbrooders. Some are paternal mouthbrooders e.g. Sarotherodon melanotheron, or biparental mouthbrooders e.g. eretmodine cichlids.
- Channidae (snakeheads): Some members of Channa are paternal mouthbrooders.
- Liparidae (snailfish): Careproctus ovigerus is the only species known to be a mouthbrooder (specifically paternal), but the breeding behavior of many other species in the family is unknown.
- Opistognathidae (jawfishes): All paternal mouthbrooders
- Osphronemidae (gouramis): A few genera (notably Betta, by far the largest genus) contain or consist entirely of paternal mouthbrooders. Two species of Sphaerichthys are maternal mouthbrooders.
- Osteoglossidae (arowanas): Some members are paternal mouthbrooders

== See also ==
- Amblyopsis – a genus of cavefish that brood in the gill chambers
- Gastric-brooding frog – an extinct genus of frog that incubated their eggs in the stomach
