= Kribensis =

Kribensis refers to a number of West African fish of the genus Pelvicachromis, most commonly Pelvicachromis pulcher, Pelvicachromis subocellatus and Pelvicachromis taeniatus.

Kribensis may also refer to:

- Kribensis (horse), an Irish Thoroughbred racehorse
- Paralabidochromis, the so-called "Rock Kribensis" cichlids of Lake Victoria
- Kribia kribensis, the sleeper goby of family Eleotridae
