= Pelvicachromis silviae =

Scientific classification
- Kingdom: Animalia
- Phylum: Chordata
- Class: Actinopterygii
- Order: Cichliformes
- Family: Cichlidae
- Subfamily: Pseudocrenilabrinae
- Tribe: Chromidotilapiini
- Genus: Pelvicachromis
- Species: P. silviae

Binomial name
- Pelvicachromis silviae Lamboj, 2013

Species of fish

Pelvicachromis silviae is a species of cichlid in the genus Pelvicachromis. It is found in the Niger River, in the same region as congeners Pelvicachromis pulcher and Pelvicachromis taeniatus.

It was described by Anton Lamboj in 2013. Prior to its formal description it was relatively common in the aquarium fish hobby, denoted as either a subspecies of Pelvicachromis subocellatus or as an undescribed species similar to P. subocelatus, Pelvicachromis sp. aff. subocellatus. Lamboj concurs that it is more closely related to P. subocellatus than to other Pelvocachromis species and regards it as part of the P. subocellatus group within the genus Pelvicachromis. Lamboj named P. silviae after his wife Silvia, to thank her for supporting his scientific work.

Although similar in appearance to P. subocellatus and the more common P. pulcher, it has a deeper body than either species. The main body color is pale or yellowish brown, with a dark horizontal stripe across the middle of its body and a second dark stripe beneath the dorsal fin. The dark stripes can fade under certain circumstances, such as dominance displays and courtship, and at times vertical bands can appear on the body, particularly while caring for fry. Males have more pointed fins and females have a metallic band on their dorsal fin. Males have a red and white margins on the top of the dorsal fin and on the top rear edge of the caudal fin, and the anal fin is red with many blue dots. The female has a red or purple belly, which becomes brighter and edged in iridescent white or blue during courtship. Males can grow to up to 4.8 centimetres (1.9 in) long, excluding the caudal fin.

It is a cave spawner similar to other Pelvicachromis species. Soft, mildly acidic water is beneficial for breeding, although they can breed in hard, slightly alkaline water. Both parents guard the eggs and fry until they are 5 to 8 weeks old, although the female does so more intensely. The fry hatch about three days after spawning and are free swimming about eight or nine days later.
