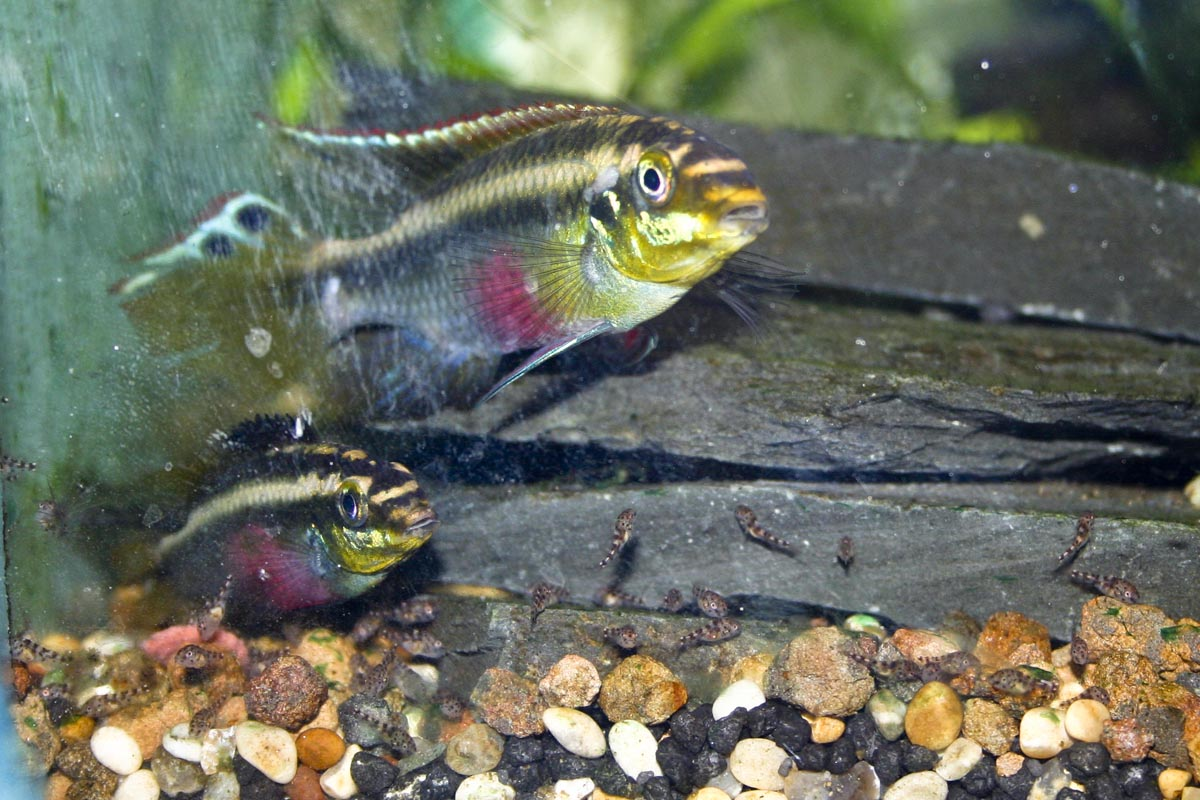
- P. sacrimontis pair with fry

Scientific classification
- Kingdom: Animalia
- Phylum: Chordata
- Class: Actinopterygii
- Division: Teleostei
- Order: Cichliformes
- Family: Cichlidae
- Subfamily: Pseudocrenilabrinae
- Tribe: Chromidotilapiini
- Genus: Pelvicachromis
- Species: P. sacrimontis

Binomial name
- Pelvicachromis sacrimontis (Paulo J, 1977)
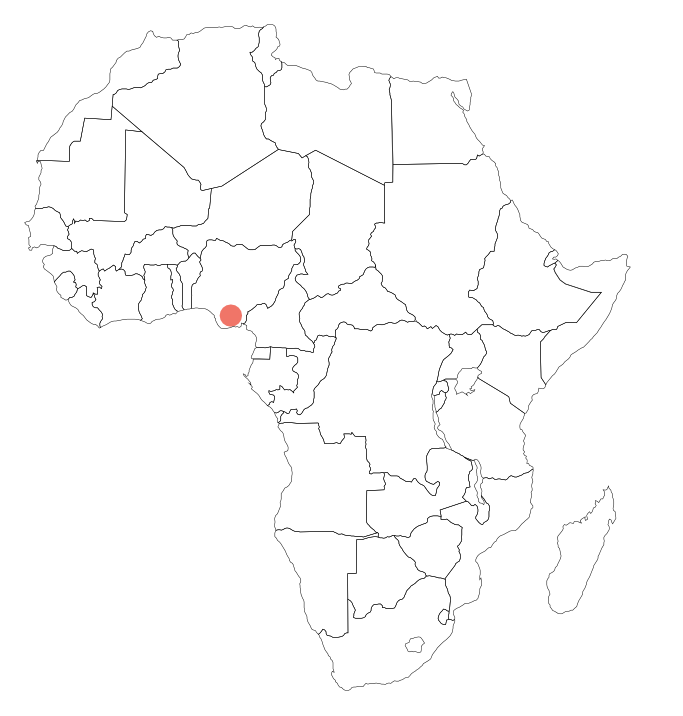
- "Distribution of P. sacrimontis"

= Pelvicachromis sacrimontis =

Species of fish

Pelvicachromis sacrimontis is a freshwater fish of the cichlid family known only from a small area of southeastern Nigeria. Currently Fishbase considers this binomial to be a junior synonym of P. pulcher and, it was also known as Pelvicachromis camerunensis, P. pulcher "form B" or P. sp. aff. pulcher but some authorities now consider it to be a valid species. It is occasionally available in the tropical fish trade as "giant krib" and there are three colour morphs – red, green and yellow. They are the most colorful of the Pelvicachromis family. Today, there is increased demand for the fish by aquarium hobbyists.

== Biology ==
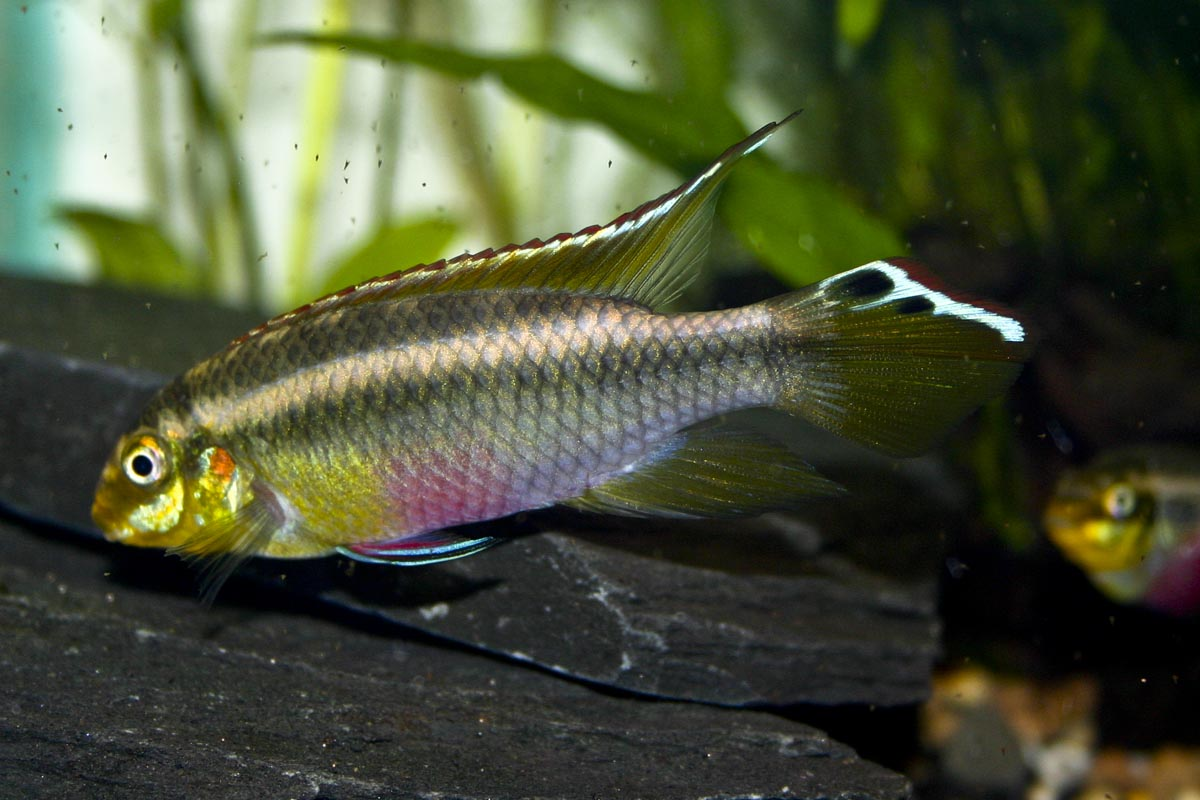
Male specimen

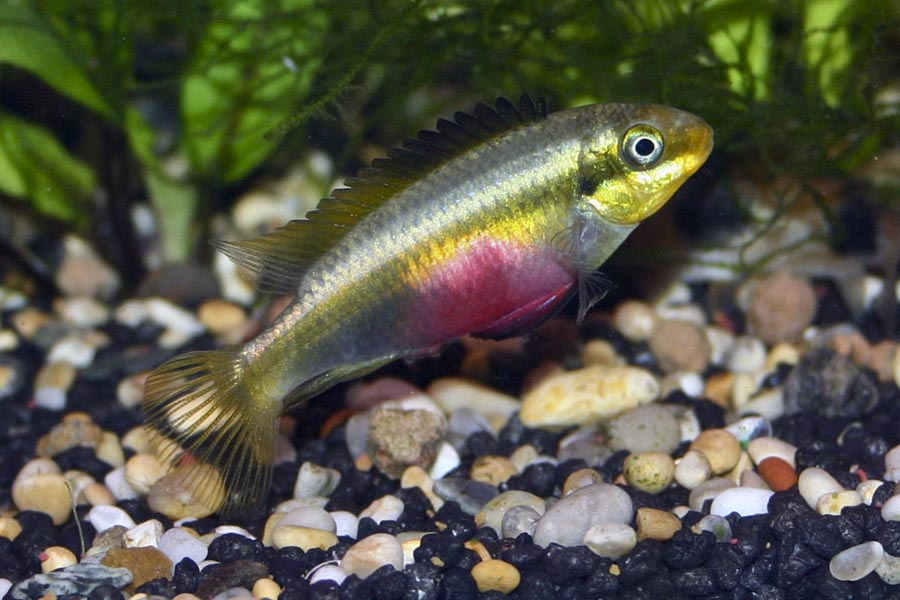
Female specimen

=== General ===
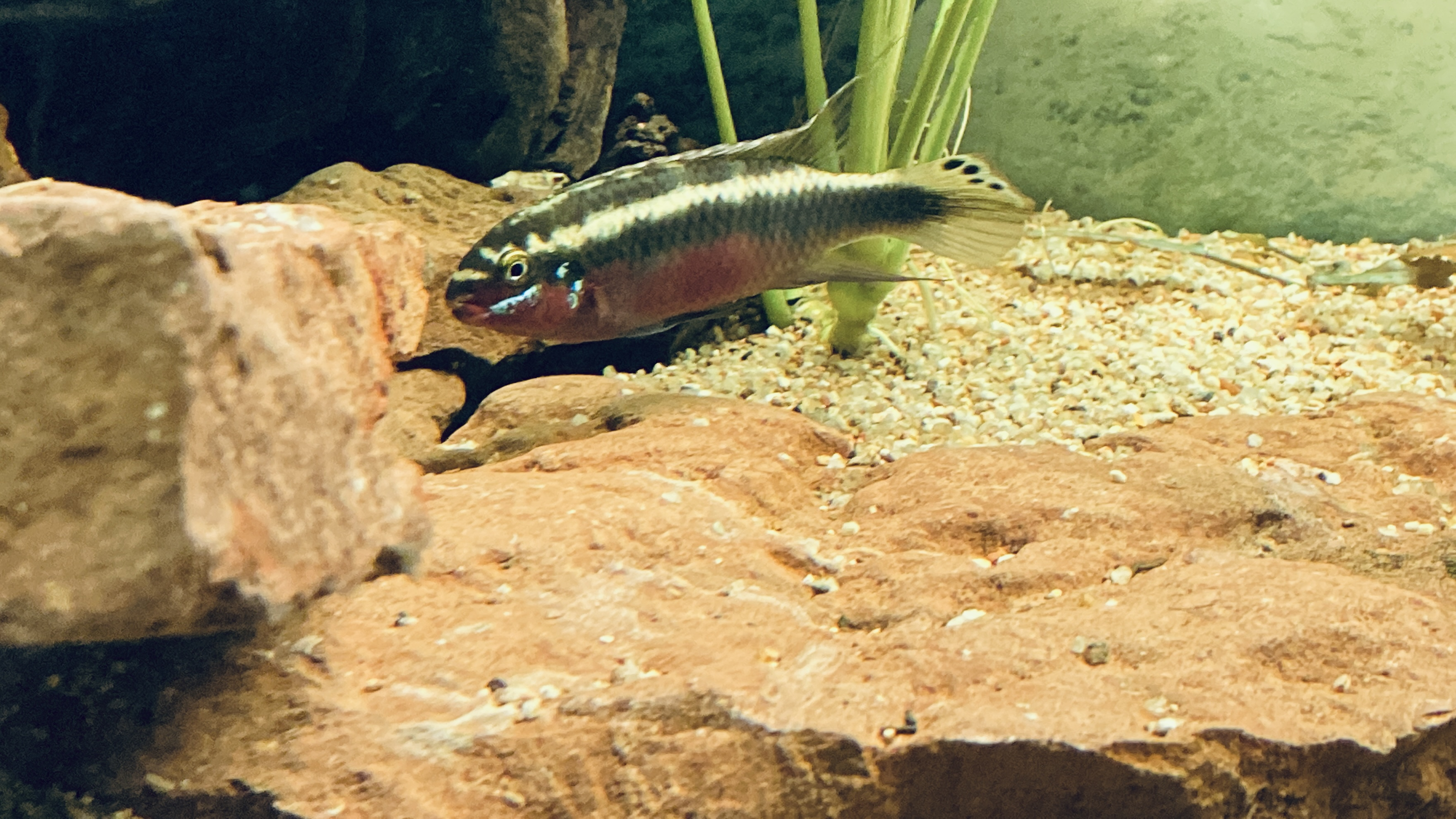
Male Sacrimontis

P. sacrimontis grows to a length of approximately 10 centimetres (3.9 in) with adult males 15–25% larger than females. Sexual dimorphism and dichromatism is well developed. The body is generally brown and darker above than below. A broad dark mid-lateral band from the posterior edge of the operculum extending to the middle parts or the end of the caudal fin is almost always visible. A black dorso-lateral band reaches from the front of the head to about the end of the dorsal fin and is separated from the mid-lateral band by a pale, whitish/yellowish band of equal or lesser depth than the dark mid-lateral band. All specimens of P. sacrimontis have a dark spot on the outer edge of the operculum which is often bordered by light blue iridescent margins. There is a dark inter-orbital stripe and a second dark stripe from the anterior edge of the eye to the upper margin of the upper lips. A bluish iridescent stripe runs from the angle of the mouth to the posterior edge of the cheek. The upper edge of eye is golden-yellow. The pelvic fins have a blue margin on the anterior edge followed by a red then a blue submargin. The rest of the pelvic fin is reddish to violet. The pectoral fins are clear to pale yellowish. Some individuals have a few black spots in the upper parts of the caudal fin and/or in the soft dorsal fin parts. The caudal fin is rounded in both sexes. Some rays in the posterior parts of the dorsal and anal fins are pronounced, but always much longer in males. The red blotch on the belly can disappear in submissive or stressed specimens.

=== Male specific characteristics ===
The first pelvic fin ray is always longest in males with the tip of the pelvic fin reaching the anterior base of the anal fin or beyond giving the fin a pointed appearance. The dorsal fin has a red margin followed by a white submargin and black base in the anterior parts and a greyish to clear base in the posterior parts. The caudal fin is clear to pale reddish with a red margin on the upper half followed by a white or iridescent blue part. The anal fin has a red margin on the anterior edge with the rest of fin blue/violet. Three colour morphs are distinguishable:

1. Yellow morph – yellow to bluish cheeks and a yellow throat, flanks and vent. Has a red blotch on the belly
2. Red morph – bright red on lower half of head including lower lip, the whole vent and the flanks until almost to the origin of the anal fin
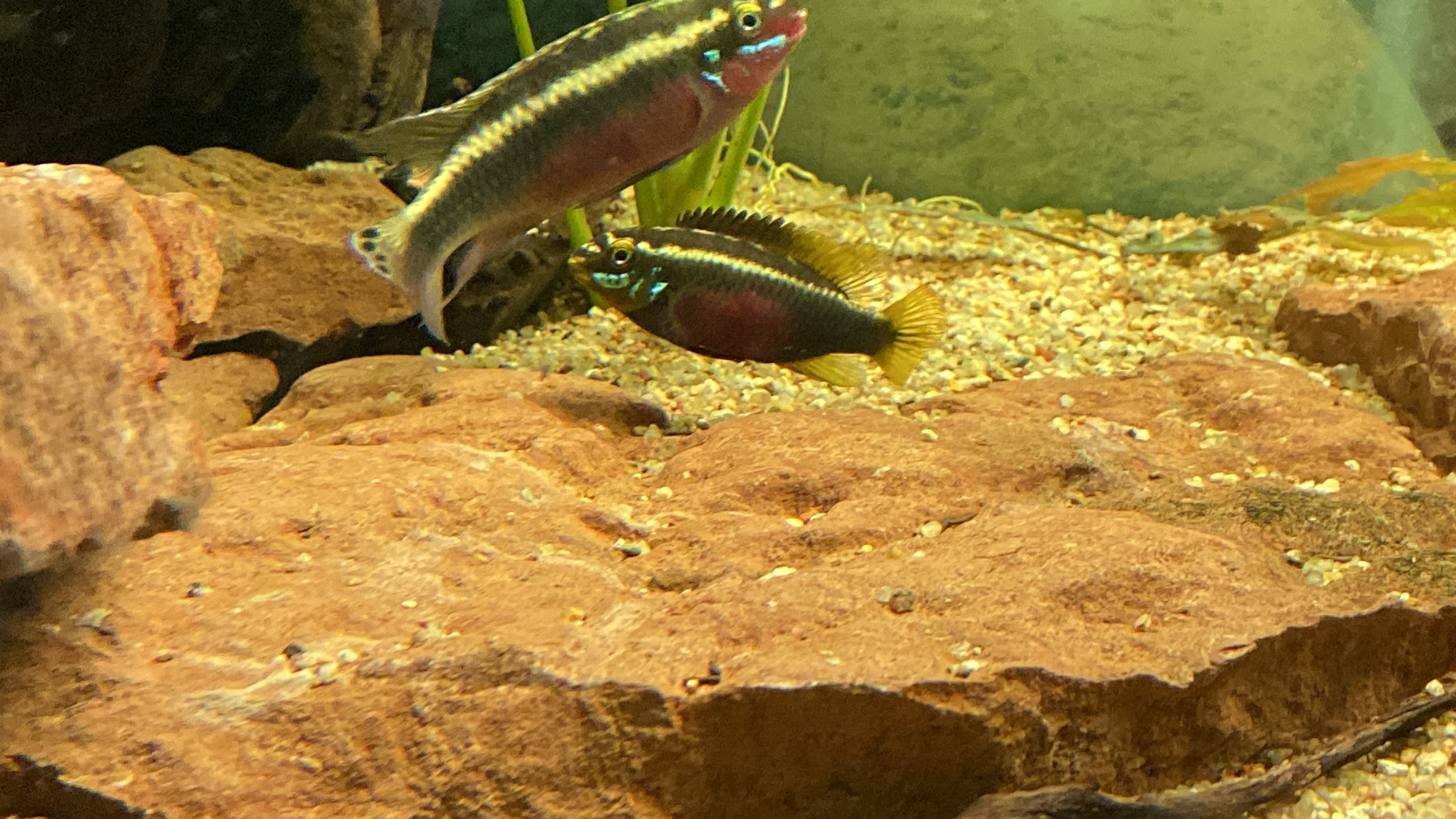
3. Male and female Sacrimontis
  Green morph – greenish parts corresponding to those that are yellow in the yellow morph

=== Female specific characteristics ===
In females the first ray of the pelvic fin is shorter or of equal length to the second ray giving the fins a rounder appearance. There is no clear distinction between females of the three colour morphs. The dorsal fin is without a margin. The spiny portion is pale, dark and dusky orange whilst the soft parts are yellowish to clear in most posterior regions. The spiny parts can be dark grey to blackish when courting (see photograph of female). The caudal and anal fin are transparent to pale yellow. The lower caudal body parts are grey to black. Females have a bright red belly which becomes paler after spawning and whilst in breeding coloration. The flanks and breast are pale yellow to bluish as are the lower opercula and sub-opercular region of the head. The flanks are blackish in aggressive and courting females of all colour morphs.

== Taxonomy ==
P. sacrimontis was first described in the monthly journal of the German Cichlid Association (DCG-Info) by Joachim Paulo in 1977 as part of an article on Pelvicachromis kribensis. As this description referenced an iconotype the taxon lacked a type specimen. Although this publication did not present a complete diagnosis according to Lamboj (1999) it constituted a valid description following the applicable articles of the International Code of Zoological Nomenclature. For a long time the validity of this taxon was either not recognized or the name was defined as an “unjustified substitute“ for Pelvicachromis camerunensis, a name that appeared in Thys van den Audenaerde (1968) but was a commercial name that was not available (Daget et al. 1991). The use of Pelvicachromis camerunensis is doubly confusing given that this species is not found in Cameroon. Nevertheless, specimens of this species were mentioned in Thys van den Audenaerde (1968) as P. pulcher "form B" or P. sp. aff. pulcher and recognized as being a distinct species, different from P. pulcher mainly in colouration patterns.
P. sacrimontis was redescribed by Anton Lamboj and Christopher Pichler in their 2012 paper with a neotype and paraneotypes being assigned from specimens held in The Royal Museum for Central Africa.

=== Etymology ===
The etymology of this species is as follows:

- Pelvicachromis: Latin, pelvica = pelvic or belly + Greek, chromis = a fish, perhaps a perch
- Sacrimontis: Latin, sacer = sacred or holy + Latin, montis = mountain.

This name is a Latin translation of "Heiligenberg". Walter Heiligenberg was a German biologist cited by Paulo in his original 1977 description of the species.

== Distribution ==
This species is only known from the Niger River and Cross River systems in the southeastern parts of Nigeria. The neotype was collected at Chokoche, Imo River, Rivers State, 04° 59' N, 07° 59' E

== Habitat ==
Detailed descriptions of the locations P. sacrimontis is found in are not available so the precise nature of its habitat is unknown. It is exported for the aquarium hobby along with P. pulcher in mixed batches and very likely shares the same or similar habitat.
