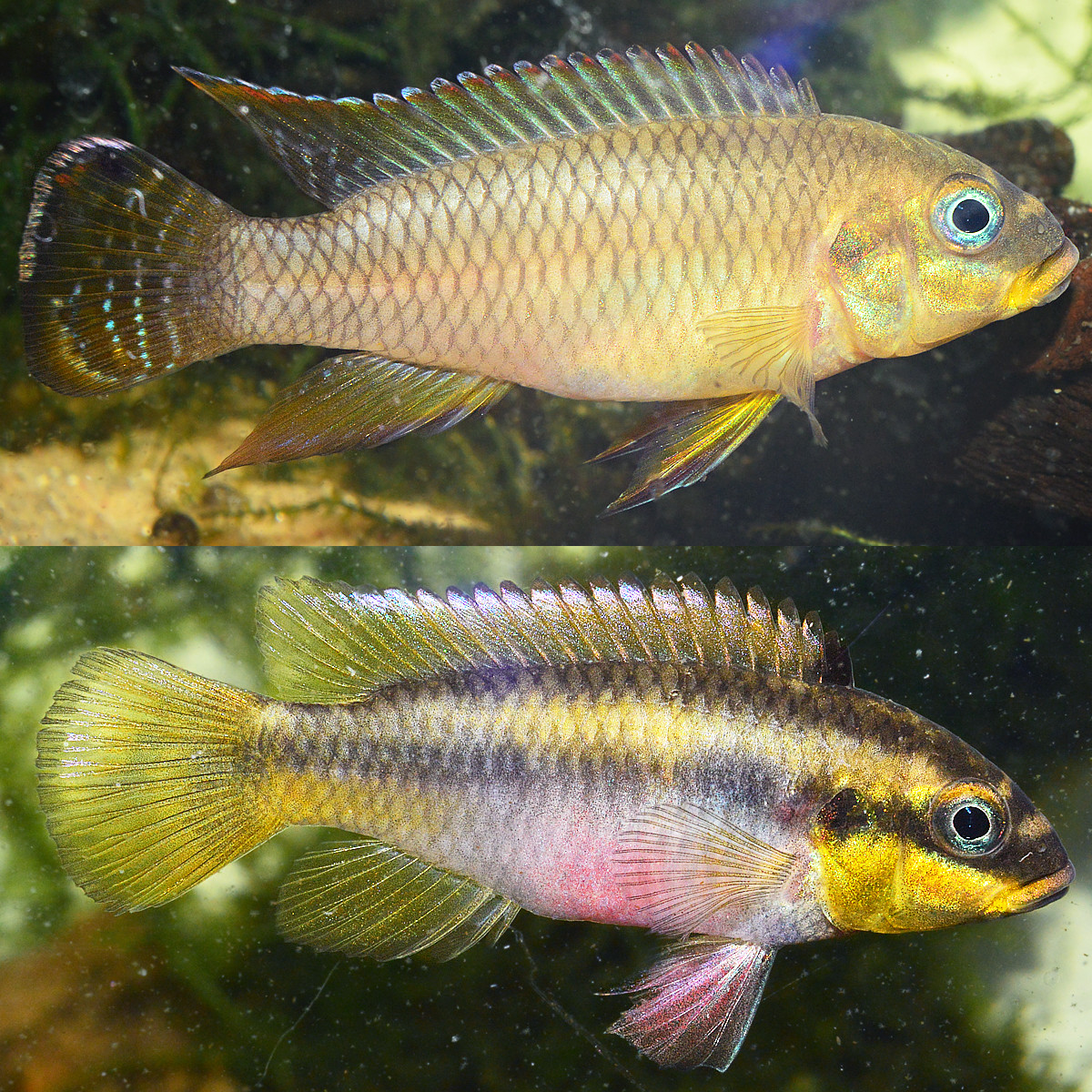

Scientific classification
- Domain: Eukaryota
- Kingdom: Animalia
- Phylum: Chordata
- Class: Actinopterygii
- Order: Cichliformes
- Family: Cichlidae
- Genus: Pelvicachromis
- Species: P. drachenfelsi

Binomial name
- Pelvicachromis drachenfelsi Lamboj, Bartel & Dell'Ampio, 2014 - animal

Synonyms
- P. drachenfelsi "Taeniatus Wouri"

= Pelvicachromis drachenfelsi =

Species of fish

Pelvicachromis drachenfelsi is a freshwater fish of the cichlid family, endemic to the Wouri River system near the town of Yabassi in Cameroon.

== Taxonomy ==
Specimens from this locality were originally believed to be the same species as Pelvicachromis taeniatus with small regional variations in colour but a study by Lamboj, Bartel & dell’Ampio in 2014 would show that it was genetically separate from P. taeniatus and shared a closer common ancestor to Pelvicachromis kribensis. The three distinctly described species of P. taeniatus, P. kribensis, and P. drachenfelsi all share a clade together and are referred to as the P. taeniatus group. The specific name was bestowed to German aquarist Ernst-Otto von Drachenfels by the authors (Lamboj et al.). This species has had some public exposure because of its prominence in the ornamental aquarium industry. Adult specimens reach a maximum of only 6.0 cm (2.4 in) and have a docile demeanor comparatively to many other cichlids. These attributes have piqued the interest of aquarists who purchase imported and captive-bred specimens.

== Sexual dimorphism ==
Determining the gender of P. drachenfelsi is straightforward when observing mature specimens due to their morphological differences and very distinct sexual dichromatism. One of the most notable ways of distinguishing genders is the prominent pink abdomen that is present in mature females. This feature of females possessing pink to crimson-red abdomens in different species of Pelvicachromis provides the genus with its namesake, Pelvica translating from Latin to pelvis and the Greek word chromis meaning fish. Males present a blue and red dorsal with red margins and variability in translucence while females possess a prominently yellow dorsal with two to three solid black dots towards the trailing end of the dorsum. Males have red, blue, and yellow in the ventral fins, while females have a small blue margin towards the front of the ventral fin though mostly being the same pink that is displayed on the abdomen. The caudal fins in males are very ornate, presenting multiple designs and colors of red and blue, a white margin and usually three solid black dots which variably turn into a solid black bar towards the far end of the fin. Female caudal fins are predominantly yellow with a small amount of translucence and a transparent grey margin. It is also variable in females to present one to two solid black dots on the caudal fin. The morphological differences come with males being 10–15% larger than that of females and males possessing sharp filaments on the dorsal, pelvic, and anal fins while females generally have rounded fins, excluding the pelvic fin.
