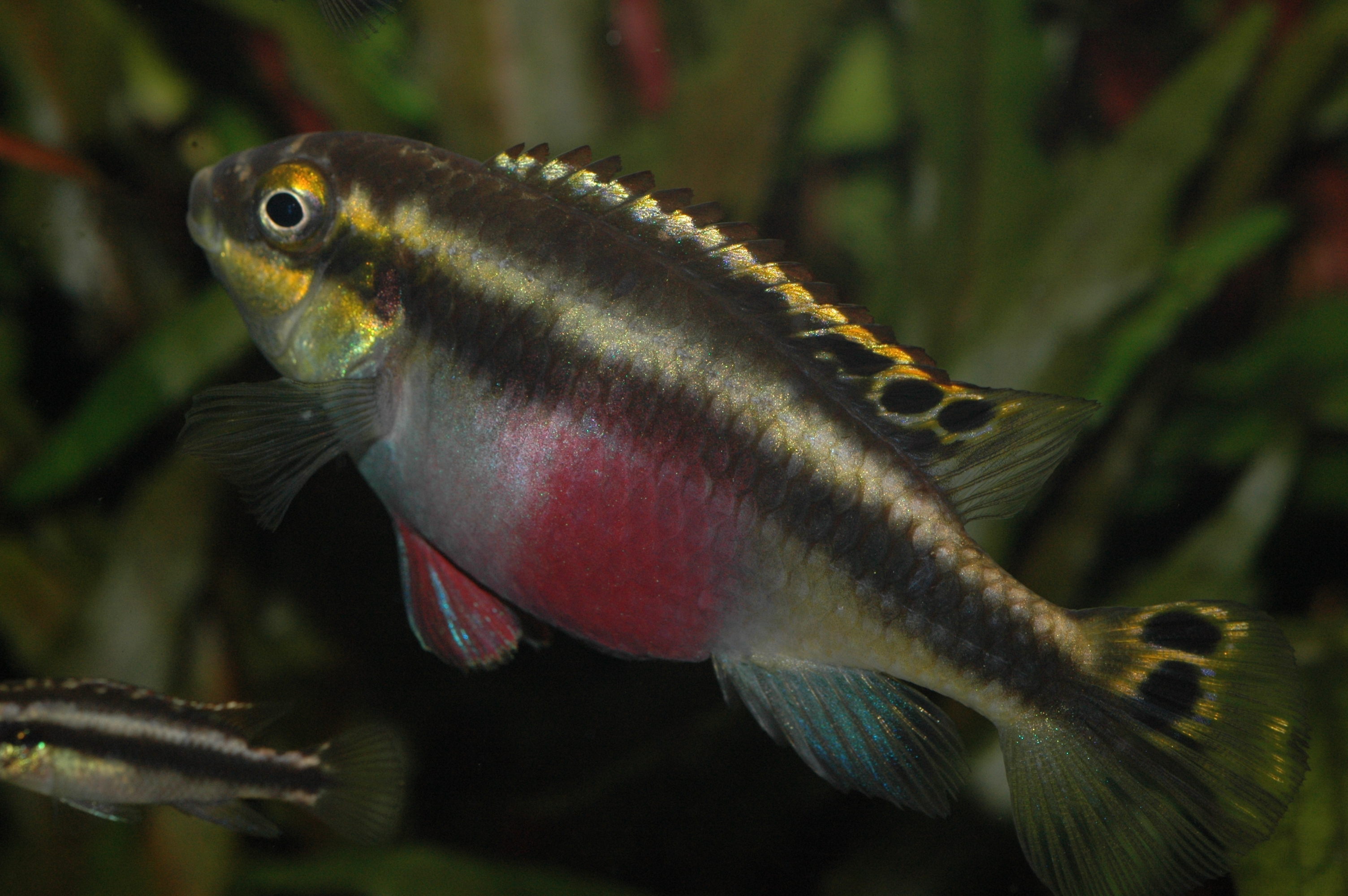
- Female Rainbow Krib (P. pulcher)

Scientific classification
- Kingdom: Animalia
- Phylum: Chordata
- Class: Actinopterygii
- Division: Teleostei
- Order: Cichliformes
- Family: Cichlidae
- Tribe: Chromidotilapiini
- Genus: Pelvicachromis; Thys van den Audenaerde, 1968

Type species
- Pelmatochromis pulcher Boulenger 1901

= Pelvicachromis =

Genus of fishes

Pelvicachromis is a genus of small (5.5–12.5 cm or 2.2–4.9 in), brightly coloured cichlids from tropical West Africa and Central Africa. They typically inhabit soft, acidic water (pH 5.6 – 6.9).

All species form monogamous pairs and use caves as spawning sites. Most are easily spawned in captivity with adequate water quality.

== Species ==
There are currently 11 recognized species in this genus:

- Pelvicachromis drachenfelsi Lamboj, Bartel & dell’Ampio, 2014
- Pelvicachromis humilis (Boulenger), 1916
- Pelvicachromis kribensis (Boulenger), 1911
- Pelvicachromis pulcher (Boulenger), 1901 (Rainbow Kribensis)
- Pelvicachromis roloffi Thys van den Audenaerde, 1968
- Pelvicachromis rubrolabiatus Lamboj, 2004
- Pelvicachromis sacrimontis Paulo, 1977 (Often mislabelled as P. pulcher)
- Pelvicachromis signatus Lamboj, 2004
- Pelvicachromis silviae Lamboj, 2013
- Pelvicachromis subocellatus (Günther), 1872
- Pelvicachromis taeniatus (Boulenger), 1901

== Natural Environment ==
Pelvicachromis species inhabit both slow and fast-moving waters in the wild but are only found present in these Central & West African watercourses near to dense underwater vegetation. The water in Pelvicachromis natural environment usually stays around 75° to 79 °F (24° to 26 °C). All described species in the genus have evolved with adaptability at the fore; water quality parameters can vary drastically within this dwarf-cichlids natural range. A species inhabiting different environments and arbitrary alterations must be able to cope with diverse habitats.

== In the aquarium ==
Pelvicachromis comprise part of the arbitrary group aquarists refer to as "dwarf cichlids". They are relatively peaceful cichlids which can be housed with other species in planted, heated tanks.

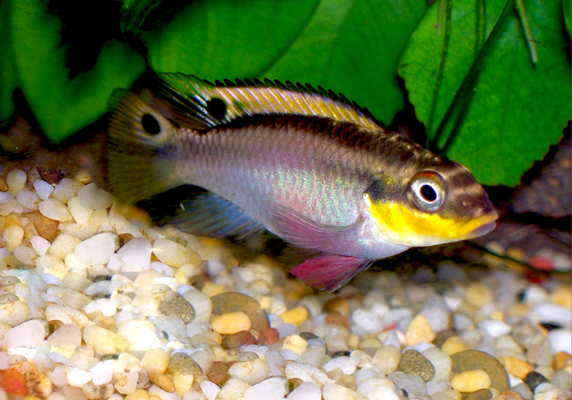
Female Pelvicachromis taeniatus "Nigerian Red". Photo by Gerard Delany

Pelvicachromis are cave-spawners and will lay their eggs in any cave-like structure such as a clay pot, PVC pipe, coconut shell, etc. The female will initiate the spawning, often displaying or vibrating in front of the male. The female will deposit 50–300 eggs in the cave and the pair will guard the eggs. The eggs hatch in 3–8 days and become free swimming in 5–10 days.

There are yellow, blue, red morphological variations found in the tropical fish hobby; these morphs are a product of natural local population variation.
