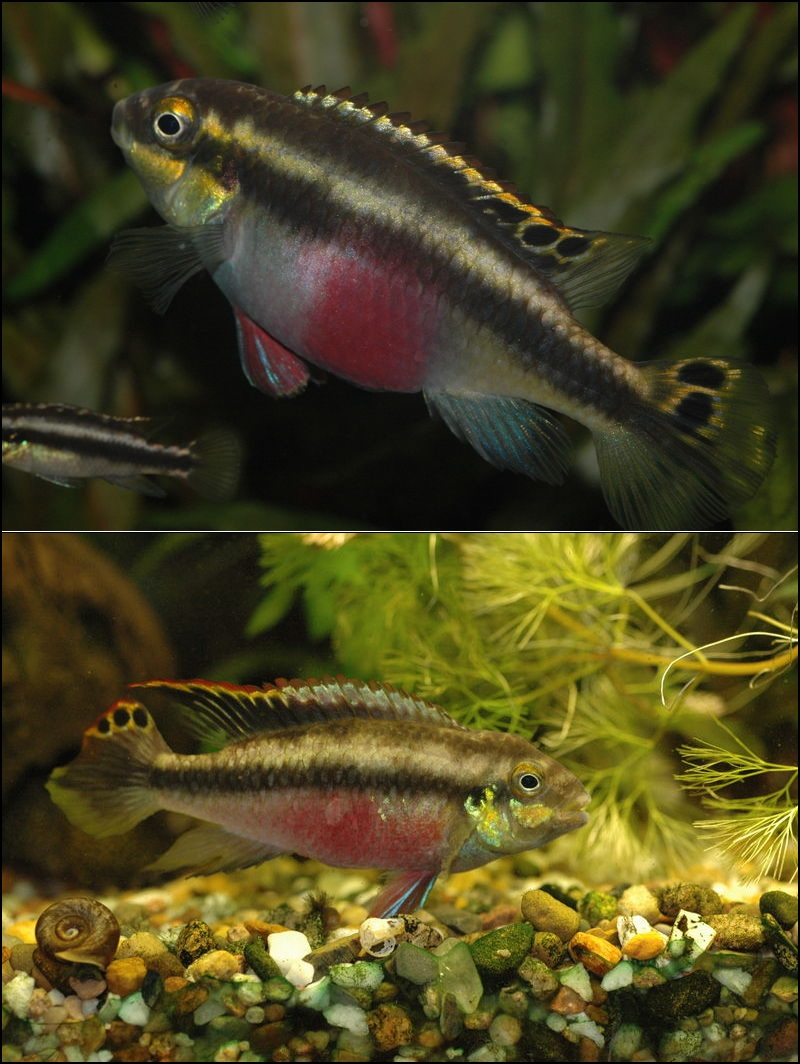
- Top: Female P. pulcher bottom: Male P. pulcher

Conservation status
- Least Concern (IUCN 3.1)

Scientific classification
- Kingdom: Animalia
- Phylum: Chordata
- Class: Actinopterygii
- Division: Teleostei
- Order: Cichliformes
- Family: Cichlidae
- Genus: Pelvicachromis
- Species: P. pulcher

Binomial name
- Pelvicachromis pulcher (Boulenger, 1901)

Synonyms
- Pelmatochromis pulcher Boulenger, 1901; Pelmatochromis aurocephalus Meinken, 1960; Pelmatochromis camerunensis Thys van den Audenaerde, 1968

= Pelvicachromis pulcher =

Species of fish

Pelvicachromis pulcher is a freshwater fish of the cichlid family, endemic to Nigeria and Cameroon. It is popular amongst aquarium hobbyists, and is most commonly sold under the name kribensis, although it has other common names, including various derivatives and color morphs of the kribensis: krib, common krib, red krib, super-red krib and rainbow krib, along with rainbow cichlid and purple cichlid.

== Description ==
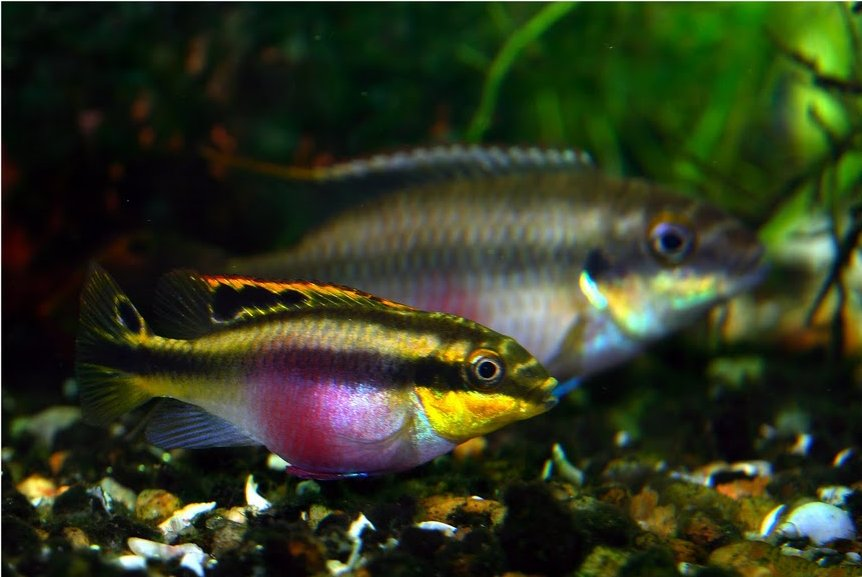
The pair, more colorful female in the front

In the wild, male P. pulcher grow to a maximum length of approximately 12.5 centimetres (4.9 in) and a maximum weight of 9.5 grams (0.34 oz). Females are smaller and deeper bodied, growing to a maximum length of 8.1 cm (3.2 in) and a maximum weight of 9.4 g (0.33 oz). Both sexes have a dark longitudinal stripe that runs from the caudal fin to the mouth and pink to red abdomens, the intensity of which changes during courtship and breeding. The dorsal and caudal fins also may bear gold-ringed eye spots or ocelli. Males show colour polymorphisms in some populations collected at single localities. Juveniles are monomorphic until approximately six months of age.

== Distribution, habitat and predators ==
Pelvicachromis pulcher is native to southern Nigeria and to coastal areas of Cameroon, where it occurs in warm (24–26 °C or 75–79 °F), acidic to neutral (pH 5.6–6.2), soft water (12–22 mg L^{−1} CaCO_{3}). Populations of P. pulcher also occur outside its natural range in Hawaii, USA as a by-product of the ornamental fish trade.

The species inhabits both slow and fast-moving water, though it is only found where patches of dense vegetation are available. Other fish that share the habitat of P. pulcher include other Pelvicachromis species (Pelvicachromis taeniatus), other cichlid species (Chromidotilapia guntheri, Hemichromis cristatus and H. fasciatus, Tilapia mariae and T. zilli) along with Brycinus longipinnis and Aphyosemion species. The species is prey for a number of rheophilic predators including Hepsetus odoe, Hydrocynus forskahlii, and Lates niloticus (Nile perch). In the natural habitat, P. pulcher have been observed excavating, defending, and sheltering in caves dug underneath plants, and these holes are also used for breeding. Not all P. pulcher, however, claim territories and many live in large, non-reproductive aggregates.

== Diet ==
Despite the suggestion in some aquarium literature that the species feeds on worms, crustaceans, and insects, analysis of the stomach contents of wild P. pulcher suggests this is incorrect. A study by Nwadiaro (1985) of 161 individuals showed that the main food items were diatoms, green algae, pieces of higher plants, along with blue-green algae. Invertebrates, though consumed, were found to be relatively uncommon food items for wild fish.

== Sexual dimorphism and reproduction ==
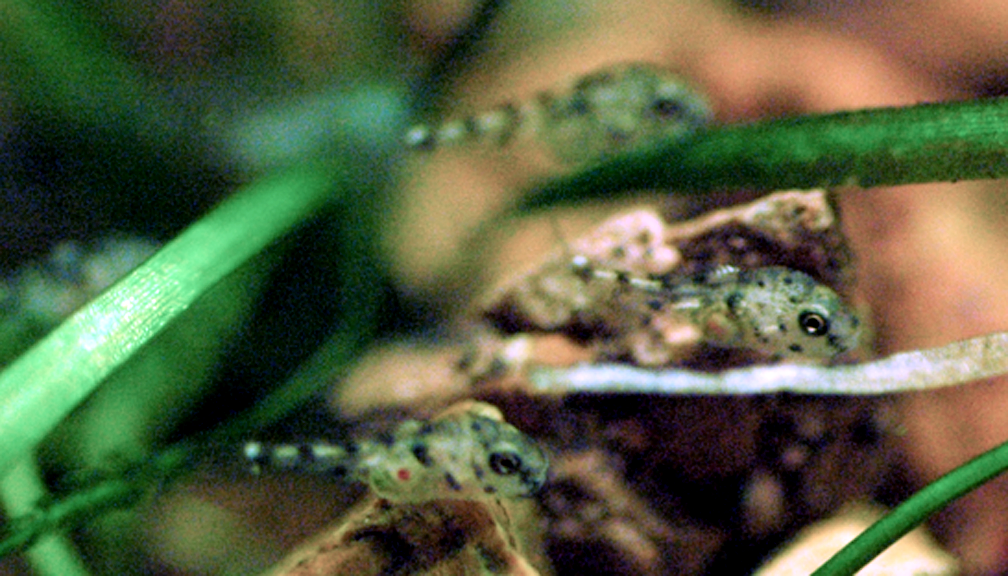
Larval P. pulcher

Like other Pelvicachromis species, P. pulcher is sexually dimorphic. Males have pointed pelvic, dorsal, and anal fins, while the female's pelvic, dorsal, and anal fins are more rounded in appearance. In addition, males are larger, lack the gold sheen to the dorsal fin and have a more elongated, spade-shaped caudal fin. Despite the suggestion in the aquarium literature that the species forms monogamous pairs, the formation of polygynous harems is not uncommon in the natural habitat. The species are secretive cave spawners (speleophils) although detailed information on their reproductive biology in the wild is limited. In the wild, the species is known to breed in holes excavated beneath aquatic and semi-aquatic plants. In captivity, artificial caves are readily accepted as breeding sites, however, these too are excavated prior to egg-laying. The eggs are adhesive and are frequently laid in rows of ca. 10 on the upper surface of the cave and produce a clutch that ranges in size from 40 to 100. Both the male and female provide active brood care, typically lasting 21–28 days, which includes guarding, herding, and feeding. It is noteworthy, however, that the female is predominantly responsible for fry care, while the male is primarily involved in territorial defence. As in all Pelvicachromis species, the gender ratio of female to male fry increases with pH. This ratio is also known to vary at different locales in the wild. Breeding pairs of P. pulcher have been known to adopt similarly aged fry from conspecifics in aquarium trials, and it has been suggested this may be an adaption to reduce predation on their own fry. Male colour polymorphism may be indicative of behavioural differences. For example, red males obtained from a single site were found to be more aggressive and more polygamous than yellow males obtained from the same site. In addition, the species has been demonstrated to engage in cooperative territorial defence where multiple males defend a single territory.

== Taxonomy ==
Pelvicachromis pulcher was originally described as Pelmatochromis pulcher by George Boulenger in 1901. Subsequently, a number of junior synonyms (Pelmatochromis aureocephalus, Pelmatochromis camerunensis) and misidentifications (Pelmatochromis kribensis, Pelmatochromis subocellatus var. kribensis and Pelmatochromis pulcher var. kribensis) were brought into use. Some of these synonyms are still in use by aquarium hobbyists which complicates identification of this species. Many of the common and trade names used for this species, such as kribensis, krib, rainbow krib are derived from the erroneous binomial, Pelmatochromis kribensis.
The genus Pelmatochromis was revised by Thys van den Audenaerde in 1968 when the genus Pelvicachromis was erected with P. pulcher designated as the type species.

The etymology of this species is as follows:

- Pelvicachromis: Latin, pelvica = pelvic or belly + Greek, chromis = a fish, perhaps a perch
- Pulcher: Latin, pretty or beautiful

== In the aquarium ==
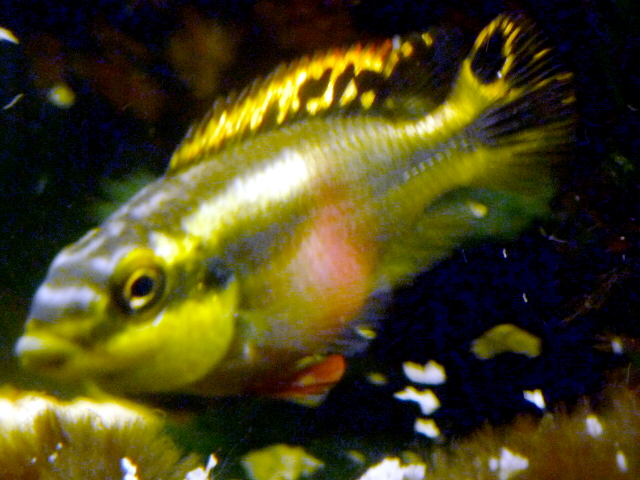
A female P. pulcher displaying her full, vivid breeding colouration. Note the dark black around the magenta-coloured stomach

Pelvicachromis pulcher is a popular cichlid for the aquarium.

=== Selective breeding ===
An albino form of the species has been developed for the aquarium trade. Unlike normal albinism, the trait is not recessively inherited in P. pulcher. The trait is incompletely dominant. Like many albino animals red and yellow pigments are retained, however, albino P. pulcher also show patches of melanin in the dorsal and caudal fin around the ocelli. Langhammer (1982) reports that matings from these albino forms with red and yellow pigments produce 25% wild coloured offspring and 75% albino fry. The albino fry were themselves divided into completely amelanistic forms, and forms which retained colouration of their parents.

== See also ==
- List of freshwater aquarium fish species
- Pelvicachromis taeniatus
