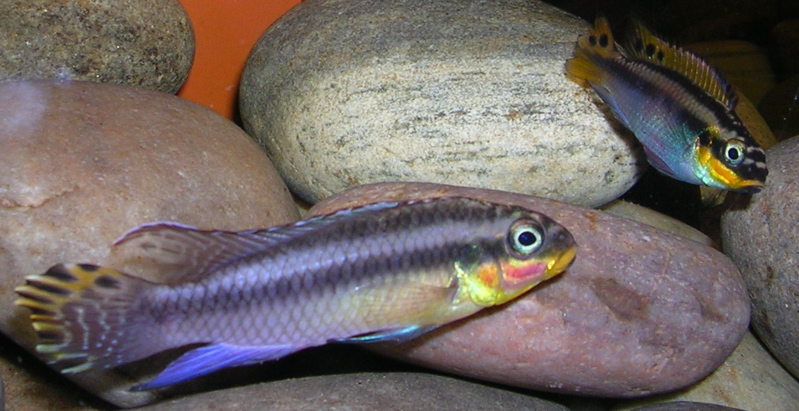
- Male below, female at right

Conservation status
- Least Concern (IUCN 3.1)

Scientific classification
- Kingdom: Animalia
- Phylum: Chordata
- Class: Actinopterygii
- Order: Cichliformes
- Family: Cichlidae
- Genus: Pelvicachromis
- Species: P. taeniatus

Binomial name
- Pelvicachromis taeniatus (Boulenger, 1901)

Synonyms
- Pelmatochromis taeniatus Boulenger, 1901; Pelmatochromis kribensis Boulenger, 1911; Pelviacachromis kribensis (Boulenger, 1911); Pelmatochromis calliptera Pellegrin, 1929; Pelmatochromis klugei Meinken, 1960; Pelmatochromis kribensis klugei Meinken, 1960; Pelmatochromis pulcher klugei Meinken, 1960; Pelmatochromis taeniatus klugei Meinken, 1960; P. taeniatus "Keinke"; P. taeniatus "Lokundje"; P. taeniatus "Moliwe"; P. taeniatus "Bipindi"; P. taeniatus species "Blue Fin"; P. taeniatus "Bandewouri"

= Pelvicachromis taeniatus =

Slender krib

Species of fish

Pelvicachromis taeniatus is a species of cichlid from Benin and Nigeria that is occasionally kept as an aquarium fish. It is native to the soft-water rivers. This species can reach a length of 7.1 centimetres (2.8 in) SL. It is known to exist in a variety of geographically restricted varieties distinguished by differences in coloration. These are often given names such as "Nigerian red" or "Moliwe" that refer to the places where each variety is collected.

The species P. taeniatus formerly included populations from Cameroon. A 2014 study by Lamboj, Bartel & dell'Ampio found that the Cameroon populations were a different species from the Nigeria populations, and identified the Cameroon populations as belonging to the species Pelvicachromis kribensis and Pelvicachromis drachenfelsi. Lamboj, Bartel & dell'Ampio found that P. kribensis, P. drachenfelsi and P. taeniatus are closely related and form a clade within the genus Pelvicachromis, which they described as the "P. taeniatus group".

== Courtship ==
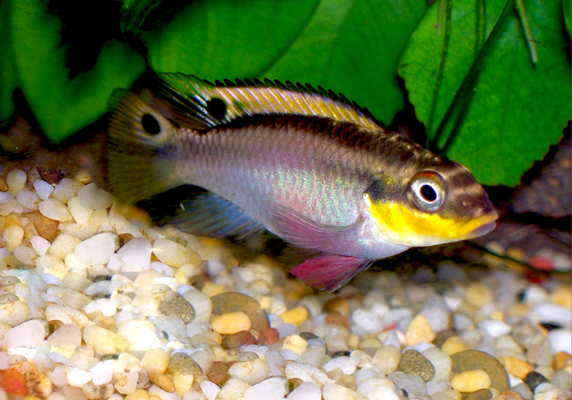
During courtship the female displays her visually arresting purple pelvic fin

During courtship females display a large and visually arresting purple pelvic fin as a sexual ornament (see image left). "The researchers found that males clearly preferred females with a larger pelvic fin and that pelvic fins grew in a more disproportionate way than other fins on female fish."
