= 2020s in climate history =

2020s in climate history refers to major events pertaining to the climate, this includes extreme weather, as well as new scientific phenomena and occurrences which pertain to the climate. This article will be structured by category of data, and then chronologically within those broader sections.

== Overview of climate topics ==
This section summarizes and delineates the scope of topics included under the broad heading of "climate."

== Natural events ==
=== 2022 ===
==== United Kingdom ====
The 2022 United Kingdom heat wave was a period of unusually hot weather across much of the United Kingdom, reaching its expected peak with a heat wave from 17 to 20 July that reached temperatures of 40 degrees in parts of England on 19 July. It is part of the wider 2022 European heat waves. The Met Office released the first heat health warnings in response to rising temperatures on 8 July. On 15 July, it declared a national emergency as the UK's first red extreme heat weather warning was put in place for much of central and southern England.

The heat wave was unprecedented; the hottest temperature ever recorded in the UK was observed on 19 July 2022, exceeding 40 °C (104 °F) for the first time in British history and surpassing a previous record set in 2019.

The heat wave caused substantial disruptions to transportation and sparked wildfires in some parts of the country.

==== North America ====
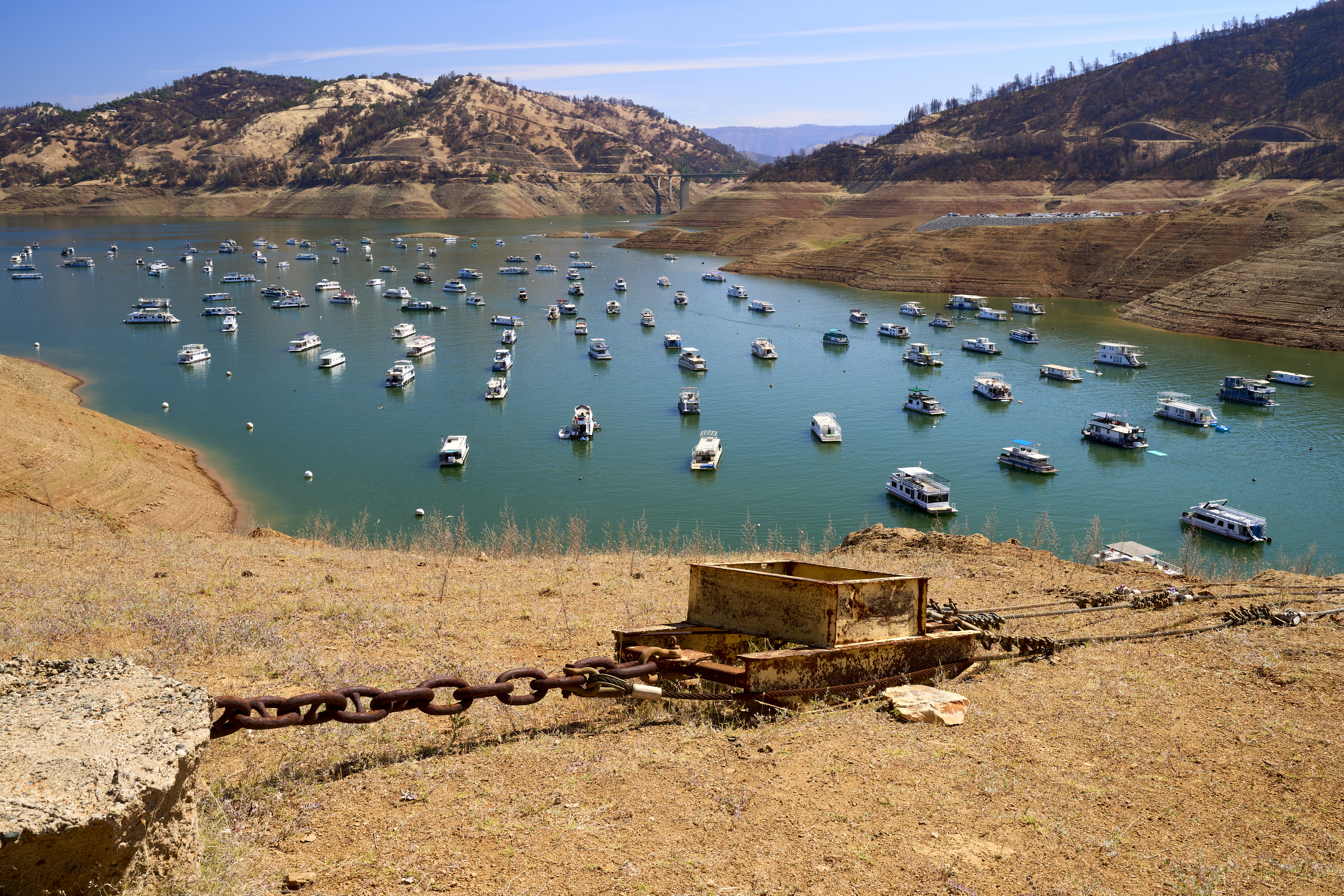
Lake Oroville, the second-largest reservoir in California, fell to a record 24% of capacity in summer 2021.

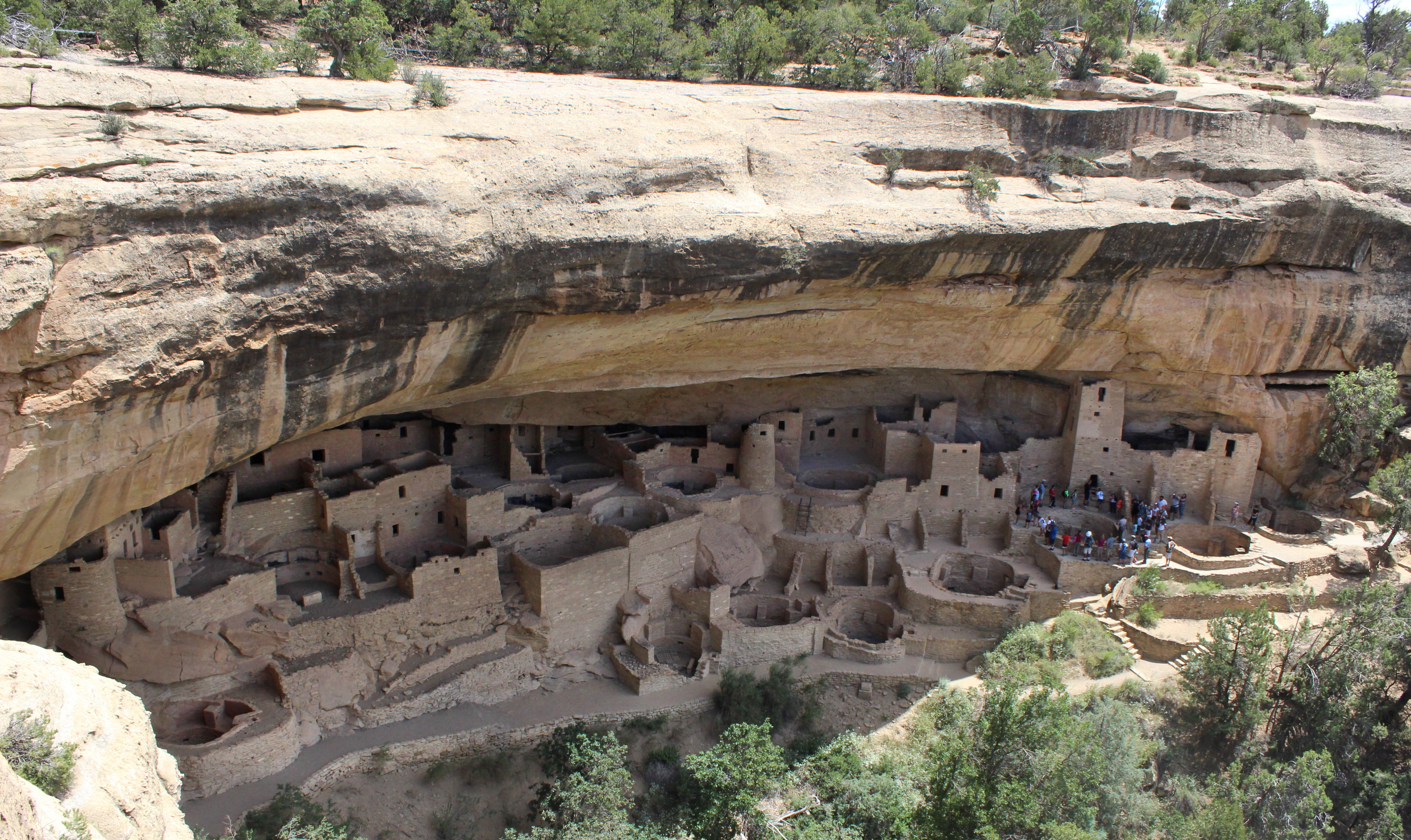
The drought that began in 1276 is hypothesized to have caused the abandonment of Cliff Palace and other Ancestral Puebloans settlements at the end of the Pueblo III Period.

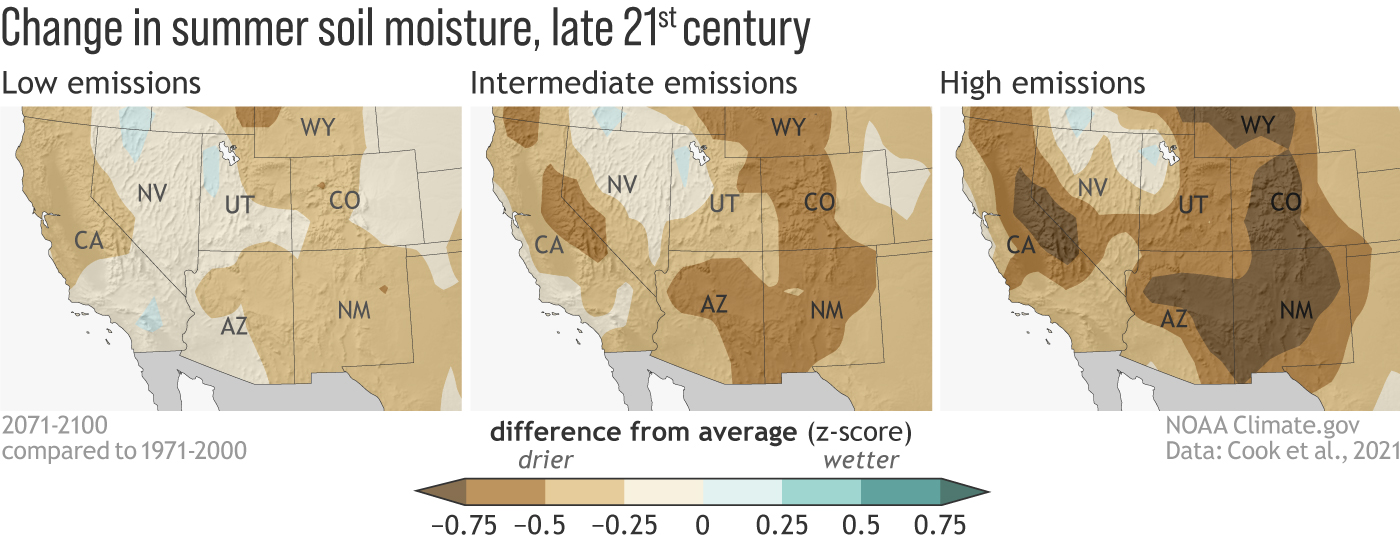
Modeled soil moisture changes at the end of the 21st century under three greenhouse gas emissions scenarios

Drought area in the United States

Drought area in California

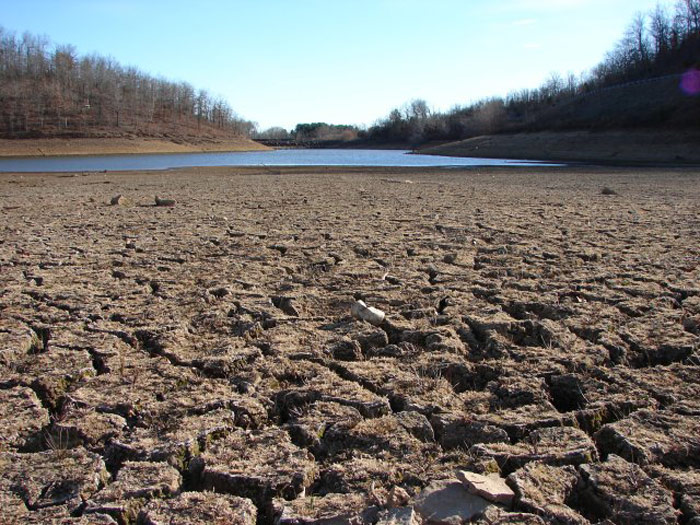
A typical dry lakebed is seen in California, which is experiencing its worst megadrought in 1,200 years, and is therefore water rationing.

The southwestern North American megadrought is an ongoing megadrought in the southwestern region of North America that began in 2000. At least 26 years in length, the drought is the driest multi-decade period the region has seen since at least 800 CE. The megadrought has prompted the declaration of a water shortage at Lake Mead, the largest reservoir in the United States. Climate change models project drier conditions in the region through the end of the 21st century.

Furthermore, global La Niña meteorological events are generally associated with drier and hotter conditions and further exacerbation of droughts in California and the Southwestern United States and to some extent Southeastern United States. Meteorological scientists have observed that La Niñas have become more frequent over time.

2023 2024

== Human activity ==
The 2021 United Nations Climate Change Conference, "COP26", was delayed for a year by the COVID-19 pandemic; it led to the Glasgow Climate Pact. Participating countries were expected to increase their pledged action towards climate change mitigation, as part of the conference's five-year 'ratchet mechanism'. China pledged to reach net zero carbon emissions by 2060, and India by 2070. Countries that include 85% of the world's forests pledged to end deforestation by 2030. However, fossil fuel industry representatives formed the largest bloc at the conference, and India and China secured the change of a coal phase-out pledge to a "phasing down" of coal. Protests against the conference were the largest in the UK since the protests against the Iraq War, with criticisms of the pledges lacking accountability and not sufficiently or urgently addressing the climate crisis.
