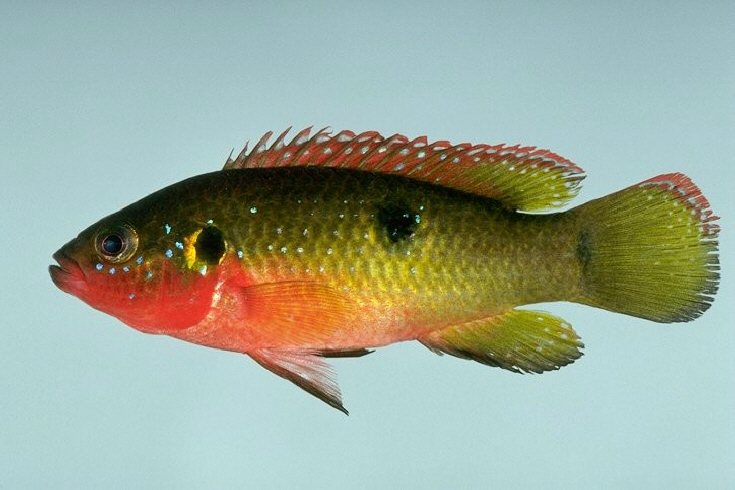

Conservation status
- Least Concern (IUCN 3.1)

Scientific classification
- Kingdom: Animalia
- Phylum: Chordata
- Class: Actinopterygii
- Division: Teleostei
- Order: Cichliformes
- Family: Cichlidae
- Genus: Hemichromis
- Species: H. letourneuxi

Binomial name
- Hemichromis letourneuxi Sauvage, 1880

Synonyms
- Hemichromis rolandi Sauvage, 1881

= Hemichromis letourneuxi =

Species of fish

Hemichromis letourneuxi is a species of cichlid native to West Africa and is popular in the aquarium hobby, and it has been introduced to the Caribbean and the Southeastern United States, where it is invasive.

== Description ==
H. letourneuxi, a small species, has quite a long, thin body and a rounded tail, with 13–15 spines in the dorsal fin and three in the anal fin. It has a highly variable background colour to the body, which may be green-yellow to red-brown or even almost black, dependent on various factors, such as the sex of the fish, the season, the nature of the fish's habitat, and stress. Breeding males may develop red colouration over the gills and underside. Both sexes have a limited number of small, brilliant blue, iridescent spots on the head, body, and fins, and these may be more obvious in breeding adults. They have a dark black spot situated above the lateral line on the flanks and smaller blotches on gill covers and base of the tail. They can reach a standard length of 12 cm (4.7 in), although a length of 7 cm (2.8 in) is more usual.

== Distribution ==
H. letourneuxi is found across the northern half of Africa from the River Nile, and has been recorded in the Gambia River and Senegal River, as well as oases in Algeria. It has been recorded as an introduced species in the Philippines, Hawaii, Europe, and Puerto Rico, as well as in Florida. It is only known to have been established in Florida and Puerto Rico, while in other areas, they do not seem to have become established or have been misidentified. In Florida, they were introduced prior to 1965 and were introduced by the aquarium trade, either by releases or by escapes. They were originally confined to the Miami Canal, but have begun to spread northwards and westwards, with their wide habitat tolerance aiding their dispersal.

== Habitat and biology ==
H. letourneuxi is found in the savannah zone and is known to thrive in a variety of still, freshwater habitats, and it is able to tolerate a wide range of water types from very soft waters through to highly saline waterbodies. It has been recorded from brackish lagoons, large lakes, and riverine flood plains. It prefers to live near vegetation beds and the margins of larger areas of aquatic habitats. Within its introduced range, this habitat tolerance has allowed it to spread, and it can be found in estuaries and other coastal waters adjacent to the freshwater habitats where it occurs.

Fishes of the genus Hemichromis are monogamous, biparental, substrate spawners that demonstrate advanced parental care of their offspring. Congeners of H. letourneuxi, H. bimaculatus and H. lifalili, have had their breeding behaviour studied in aquaria, and it is thought to be typical of the genus. The males and females form monogamous pairs, which are thought to be permanent. When breeding, the colours of both sexes become more intense and they choose a spawning site, normally a flat rock. The male then chases the female, quite vigorously, to induce her to spawn. Spawning is similar to many other cichlids; the female lays a line of eggs and the male fertilises them. The female may lay up to 600 eggs and the male defends the spawning site as the female looks after the eggs. After around 72 hours, the eggs hatch and the fry are shifted into a shallow depression in the substrate close to the spawning site. The fry are able to swim freely after 24 hours, but the parents care for them for some time after that. Reproductive activity in Africa likely coincides with the onset of the flood season.

Studies on the diet of H. letourneuxi have shown that it is an omnivore, but that it mainly eats larger invertebrates and small fish, including smaller specimens of its own species and other cichlids. Algae and other plant material have also been found in the stomachs of this species. In Florida, this species is preyed upon by the Florida green watersnakes, as well as by the fishes common snook, Florida gar, largemouth bass, longnose gar, and bowfin. In the Senegal River, the gills of this species were found to be parasitized by the monogenean Cichlidogyrus dracolemma.

== Etymology ==
The specific name of this fish honours the collector of the type specimen, botanist Aristide-Horace Letourneux (1820-1890).
