= Megadrought =

Prolonged drought lasting two decades or longer

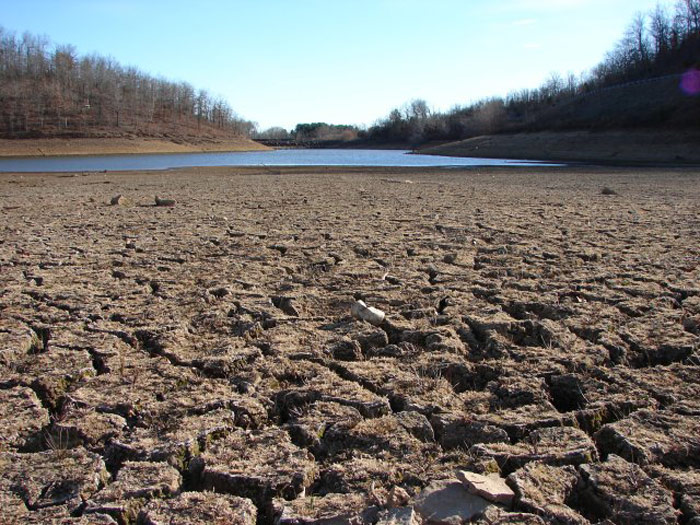
A typical dry lakebed is seen in California, which experienced its worst megadrought in 1,200 years in 2022. The drought was precipitated by climate change. California rationed water in response.

A megadrought is an exceptionally severe drought, lasting for many years and covering a wide area.

== Definition ==
There is no exact definition of a megadrought. The term was first used by Connie Woodhouse and Jonathan Overpeck in their 1998 paper, 2000 Years of Drought Variability in the Central United States. In this, it referred to two periods of severe drought in the US – one at the end of the 13th century and the other in the middle of the 16th century. The term was then popularised as a similar severe drought affected the Southwestern US from the year 2000.

Benjamin Cook suggested that the definition be a drought which is exceptionally severe compared to the weather during the previous 2,000 years. This was still quite imprecise and so research has suggested quantitative measures based on a Standard Precipitation Index.

== Causes ==
Past megadroughts in North America have been associated with persistent multiyear La Niña conditions (cooler than normal water temperatures in the tropical eastern Pacific Ocean).

== Impact ==
In the Southwestern North American megadrought starting in about the year 2000, the water level of Lake Mead declined to within 100 feet (30 m) of the 950-foot minimum power pool for Hoover Dam.

Megadroughts have historically led to the mass migration of humans away from drought affected lands, such as the Sahel region located in Africa, resulting in a significant population decline from pre-drought levels. They are suspected of playing a primary role in the collapse of several pre-industrial civilizations, including the Ancestral Puebloans of the North American Southwest, the Khmer Empire of Cambodia, the Maya of Mesoamerica, the Tiwanaku of Bolivia, and the Yuan Dynasty of China.

The African Sahel region in particular has suffered multiple megadroughts throughout history, with the most recent lasting from approximately 1400 AD to 1750 AD. North America experienced at least four megadroughts during the Medieval Warm Period.

== Historical evidence ==
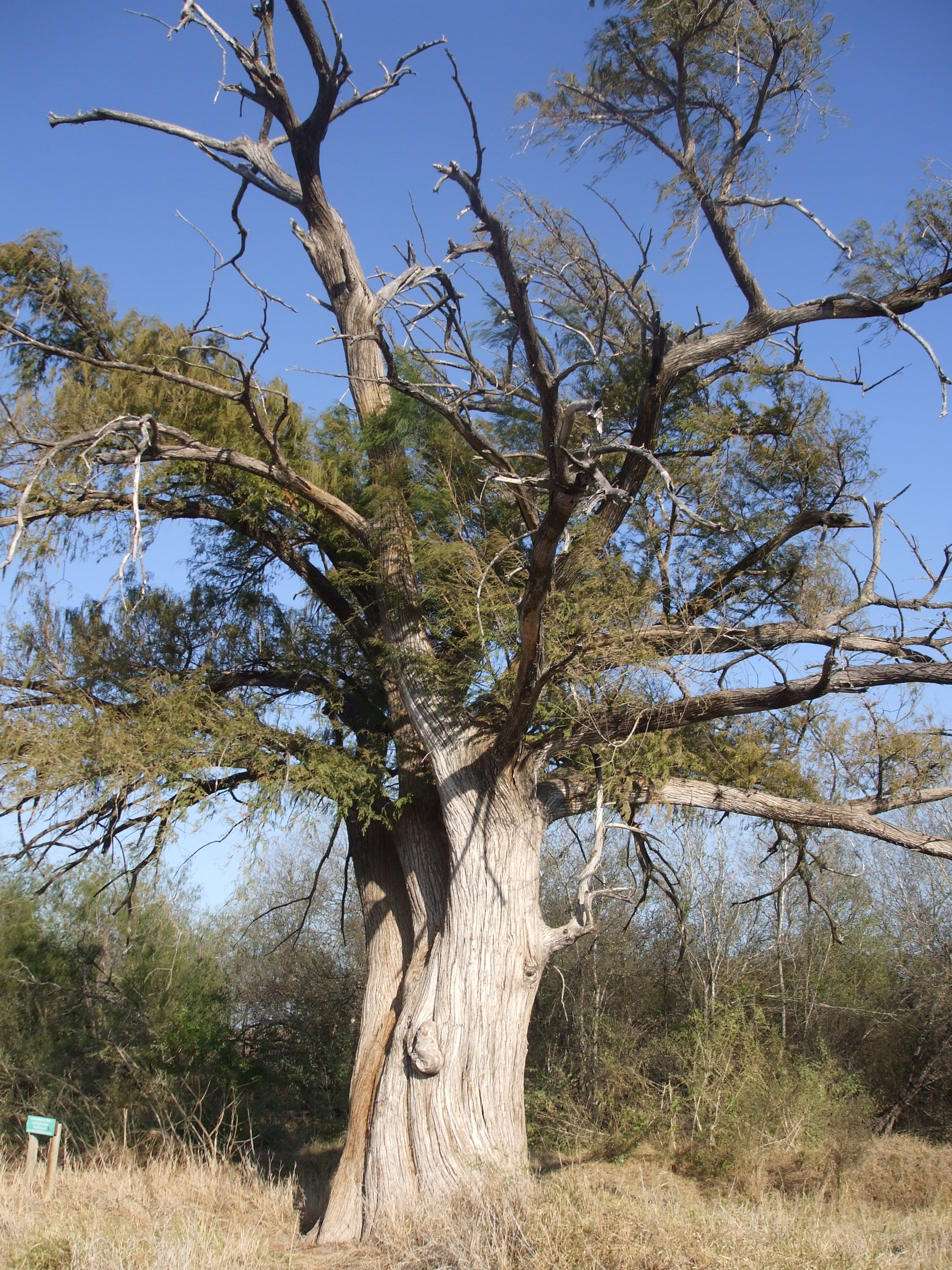
Montezuma Bald Cypress tree, 900 years old

There are several sources for establishing the past occurrence and frequency of megadroughts, including:

- When megadroughts occur, lakes dry up and trees and other plants grow in the dry lake beds. When the drought ends, the lakes refill; when this happens the trees are submerged and die. In some locations these trees have remained preserved and can be studied giving accurate radio-carbon dates, and the tree rings of the same long dead trees can be studied. Such trees have been found in Mono and Tenaya lakes in California, Lake Bosumtwi in Ghana; and various other lakes.
- Dendrochronology, the dating and study of annual rings in trees. The tree-ring data indicate that the Western U.S. states have experienced droughts that lasted ten times longer than anything the modern U.S. has seen. Based upon data derived from annual tree rings, NOAA has recorded patterns of drought covering most of the U.S. for every year since 1700. Certain species of trees have given evidence over a longer period, in particular Montezuma Cypress and Bristlecone pine trees. The University of Arkansas has produced a 1238-year tree-ring based chronology of weather condition in central Mexico by examining core samples taken from living Montezuma Cypress trees.
- Sediment core samples taken at the volcanic caldera in Valles Caldera, New Mexico and other locations. The cores from Valles Caldera go back 550,000 years and show evidence of megadroughts that lasted as long as 1,000 years during the mid-Pleistocene Epoch during which summer rains were almost non-existent. Plant and pollen remains found in core samples from the bottom of lakes have been also studied and added to the record.
- Fossil corals on Palmyra Atoll. Using the relationship between tropical Pacific sea surface temperatures and the oxygen isotope ratio in living corals to convert fossil coral records into sea surface temperatures. This has been used to establish the occurrence and frequency of La Niña conditions.
- During a 200-year mega drought in the Sierra Nevada that lasted from the 9th to the 12th centuries, trees would grow on newly exposed shoreline at Fallen Leaf Lake, then as the lake grew once again, the trees were preserved under cold water. However, a 2016–2017 expedition by the Undersea Voyager Project found evidence that the ancient trees did not grow there during an ancient drought, but rather slid into the lake during one of the many seismic events that have occurred in the Tahoe Basin since it was formed.
- The 2000–present southwestern North American megadrought was the driest 22-year period in the region since at least 800. Both 2002 and 2021 were drier than any other years in nearly 300 years and were, respectively, the 11th and 12th driest years between 800 and 2021. The atmospheric rivers of 2024 delivered some of the wettest climate since 2004.
