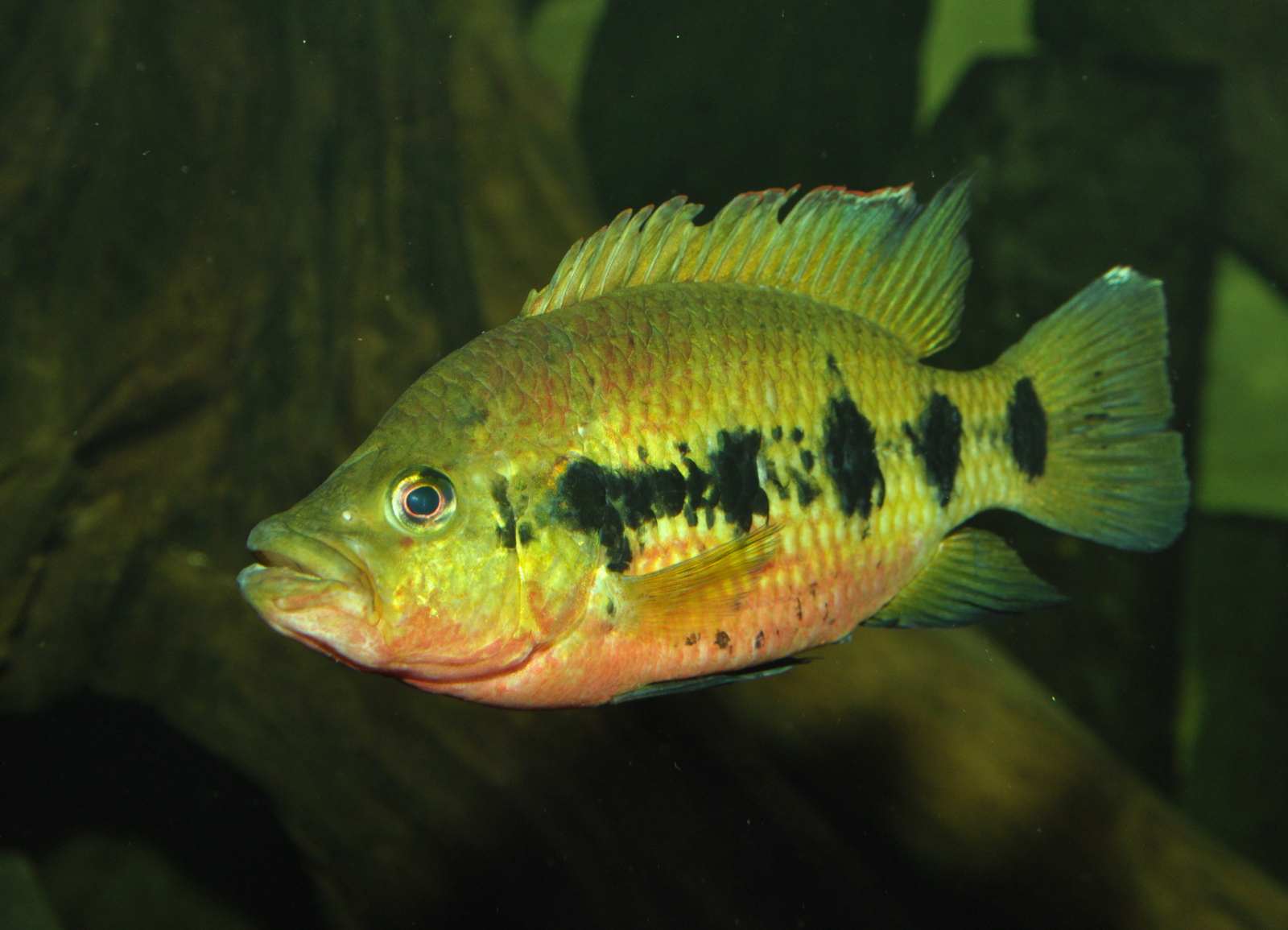

Scientific classification
- Kingdom: Animalia
- Phylum: Chordata
- Class: Actinopterygii
- Order: Cichliformes
- Family: Cichlidae
- Genus: Hemichromis
- Species: H. frempongi

Binomial name
- Hemichromis frempongi Loiselle, 1979

= Hemichromis frempongi =

Species of fish

Hemichromis frempongi is a species of fish in the cichlid family. It is endemic to Lake Bosumtwi in Ghana. Its validity as a species is questionable, and some believe it should be included in the widespread H. fasciatus.
