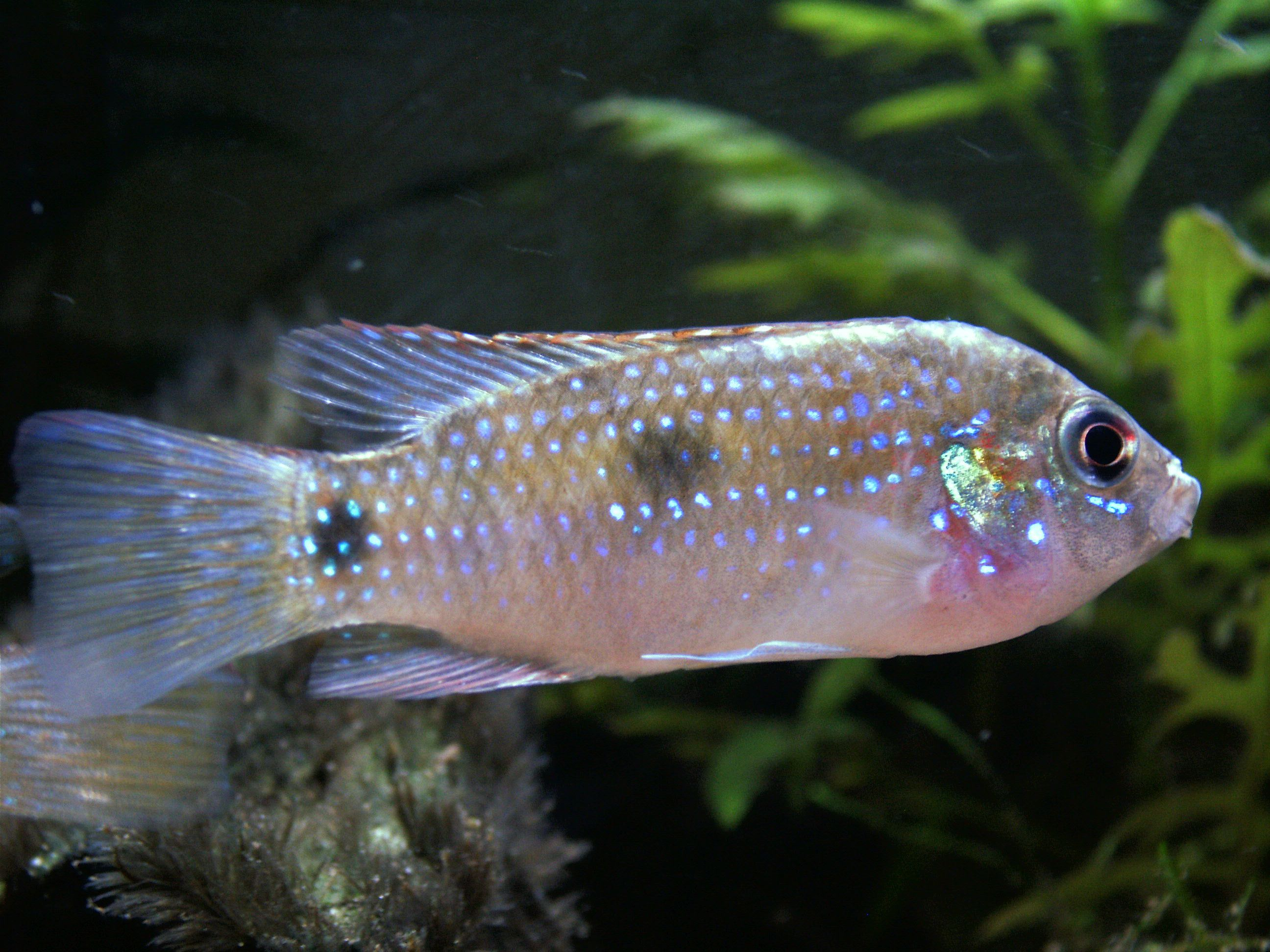

Conservation status
- Least Concern (IUCN 3.1)

Scientific classification
- Kingdom: Animalia
- Phylum: Chordata
- Class: Actinopterygii
- Order: Cichliformes
- Family: Cichlidae
- Subfamily: Pseudocrenilabrinae
- Tribe: Hemichromini
- Genus: Anomalochromis; Greenwood, 1985
- Species: A. thomasi

Binomial name
- Anomalochromis thomasi (Boulenger, 1915)

Synonyms
- Paratilapia thomasi Boulenger, 1915; Haplochromis thomasi (Boulenger, 1915); Hemichromis thomasi (Boulenger, 1915); Pelmatochromis thomasi (Boulenger, 1915)

= Anomalochromis =

Genus of fishes

Anomalochromis is a genus of fish in the family Cichlidae, containing the single species Anomalochromis thomasi, the African butterfly cichlid. It is a small cichlid growing to a length of 6–8 cm (2.4–3.1 in). The natural habitat of A. thomasi is Sierra Leone, Liberia, and Guinea, mainly in smaller streams. The fish are typically found in slightly acidic, oxygen-rich water with other West African cichlid genera such as Hemichromis and Pelvicachromis.

This species is found in forest streams, shaded by dense overhanging vegetation where the water is heavily stained with tannins from decaying organic matter. In these streams, the temperature of the water can approach 30 °C (86 °F) in the dry season. It can also occur in streams in forest edge habitats. Under stress or when disturbed, A. thomasi can bury itself in the mud, occasionally down to 30 cm (12 in). They form pairs which spawn into the substrate. These pairs are territorial; the female selects a laying site on a leaf or flat rock that the male and she clean. After laying, the brood is mainly cared for by the female, although the male sometimes relieves her. Within 72 hours of hatching, the young are moved to one of a number of depressions in the substrate created by their parents. They remain there until they become free swimming.

The specific name of this species honours English aquatic technician W. Thomas (born 1965, the collector of the type specimen).

== See also ==
- List of freshwater aquarium fish species
