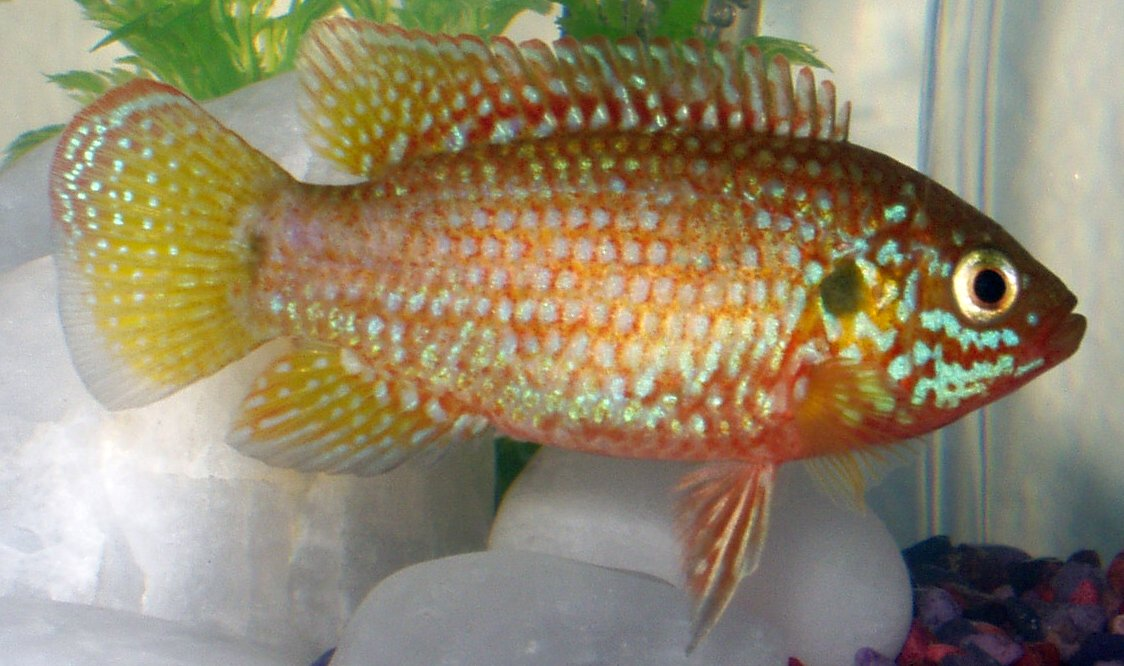

Conservation status
- Least Concern (IUCN 3.1)

Scientific classification
- Kingdom: Animalia
- Phylum: Chordata
- Class: Actinopterygii
- Order: Cichliformes
- Family: Cichlidae
- Genus: Hemichromis
- Species: H. bimaculatus

Binomial name
- Hemichromis bimaculatus T. N. Gill, 1862

Synonyms
- Hemichromis fugax Payne & Trewavas, 1976; Hemichromis cristatus Loiselle, 1979

= African jewelfish =

Species of fish

The African jewelfish (Hemichromis bimaculatus), also known as jewel cichlid or jewelfish, is from the family Cichlidae.

== Description ==
Hemichromis bimaculatus can grow up to 15 cm (6 in) long. H. bimaculatus are red with fine "jewel-like" blue spots and three dark spots on the sides, the first on the opercle, the second in the middle of the body, the third at the base of the tail.

These colorful fishes are popular among fishkeepers, but they are unsuitable for typical community aquariums because of their aggressive territorial behavior, especially when breeding.

== Distribution and habitat ==
The species originates from West Africa (hence its name), with additional reports (possibly other Hemichromis species) from Middle Africa and the Nile Basin. They are found in rivers, streams, and canals, especially in forested regions where vegetation overhangs the water surface.

H. bimaculatus, the true African jewelfish, reportedly has been found throughout a large part of Africa, but this is, at least in part, because of taxonomic uncertainty. It is certainly found in West Africa, but if it is the same species in Middle Africa and the Nile Basin remains unclear.

The same confusion exists elsewhere, as Hemichromis species have been introduced to regions far from their native Africa. For example, the true African jewelfish, H. bimaculatus, is reportedly the species introduced to the United States, specifically Florida (and spreading), but this involves the related H. letourneuxi. Another relative that has become popular in the aquarium trade is H. lifalili, but it is easily recognized by lacking a dark spot at the base of the tail.
