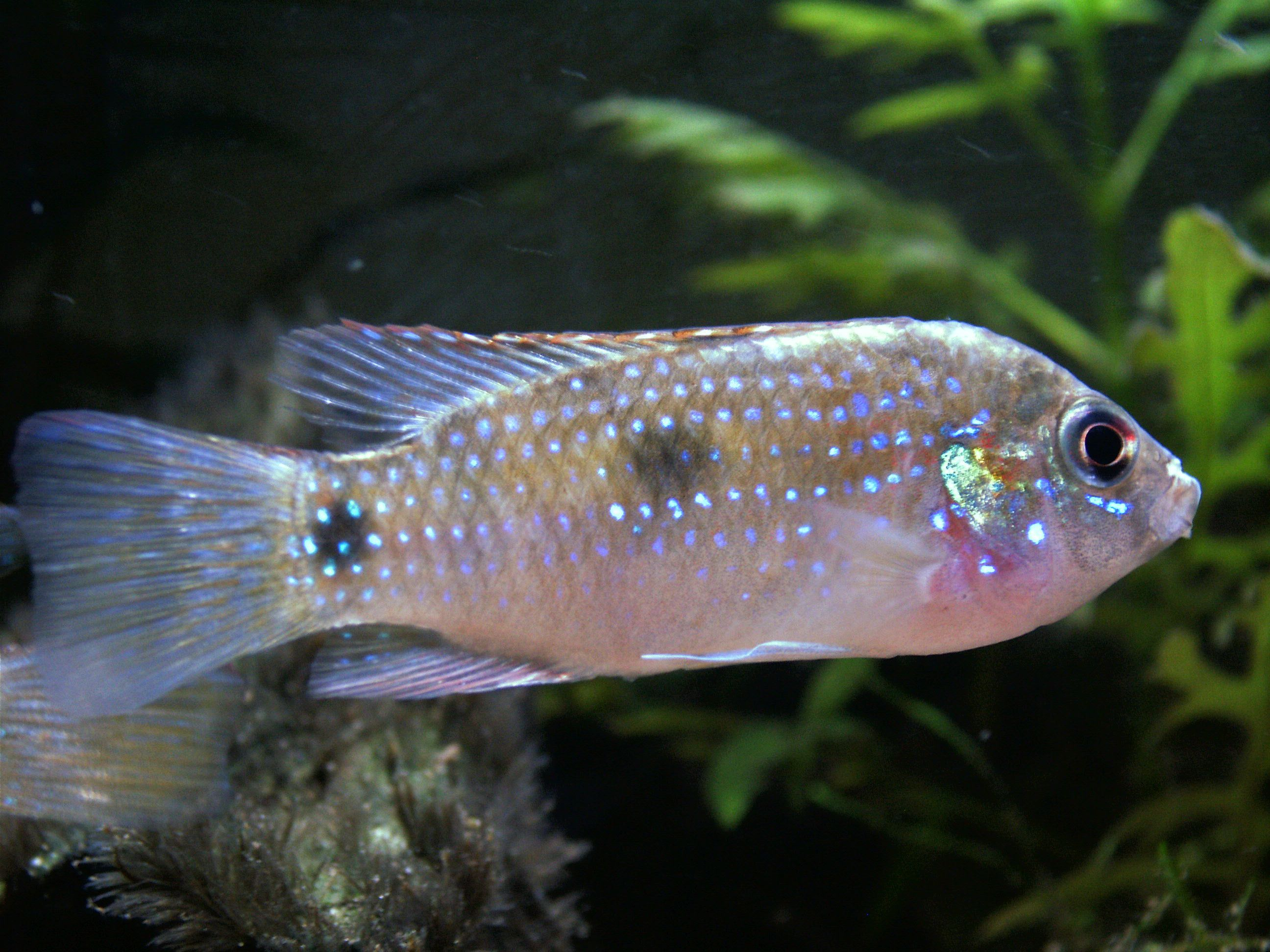
- Anomalochromis thomasi

Scientific classification
- Kingdom: Animalia
- Phylum: Chordata
- Class: Actinopterygii
- Order: Cichliformes
- Family: Cichlidae
- Subfamily: Pseudocrenilabrinae
- Tribe: Hemichromini; Hoedeman, 1947

Genera
- Anomalochromis Greenwood, 1985; Hemichromis Peters, 1857 Rubricatochromis Lamboj & Koblmüller, 2022

= Hemichromini =

Tribe of fishes

Hemichromini is a tribe of African cichlids. The group consists of 14 species of freshwater fish from two genera: one species in Anomalochromis and the remaining in Hemichromis.
