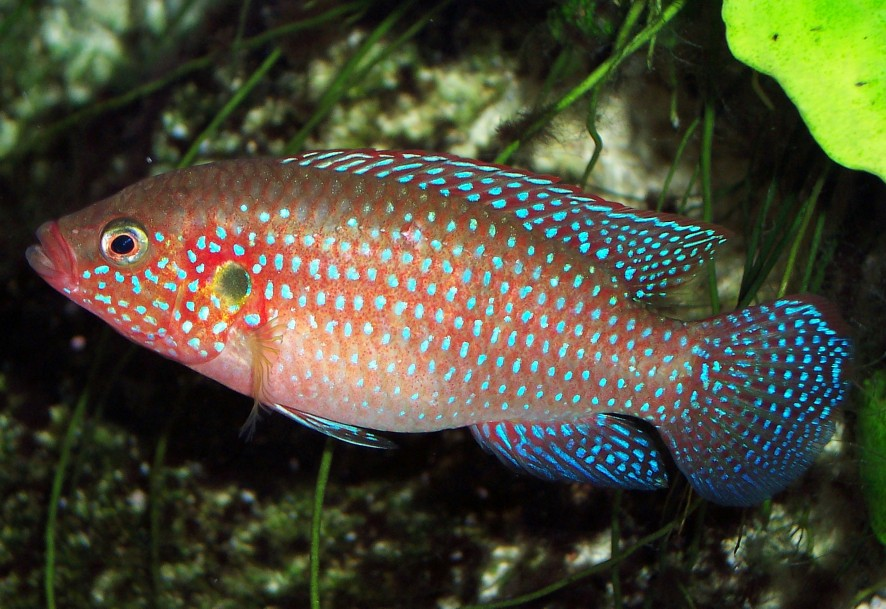
- Hemichromis lifalili

Scientific classification
- Kingdom: Animalia
- Phylum: Chordata
- Class: Actinopterygii
- Order: Cichliformes
- Family: Cichlidae
- Subfamily: Pseudocrenilabrinae
- Tribe: Hemichromini
- Genus: Hemichromis; W. K. H. Peters, 1857

Type species
- Hemichromis fasciatus W. K. H. Peters, 1857

= Jewel cichlid =

Genus of fish

Hemichromis is a genus of fishes from the cichlid family, known in the aquarium trade as jewel cichlids. Jewel cichlids are native to Africa. Within West Africa, Hemichromis species are found in creeks, streams, rivers, and lakes with a variety of water qualities, including brackish-water lagoons. As traditionally defined, the genus includes two distinctly different groups: The five-spotted cichlid group (Hemichromis sensu stricto) and the true jewel cichlid group (Rubricatochromis), which sometimes are recognized as distinct genera.

The maximum size reported for the different species of Hemichromis ranges from 6.5 to 26.5 cm (2.5–10.5 in) in total length. Maximum sizes in aquaria tend to be slightly smaller than in the wild.

Many Hemichromis species are brightly colored, though brighter body coloration is generally evident during breeding. Sexual dimorphism is limited, though male jewel cichlids are typically more brightly coloured and in some species have more pointed anal, ventral, and dorsal fins. In some species, such as H. cristatus, the females can have coloring as bright as the males. Like most cichlids, jewel cichlids have highly developed brood care. Hemichromis species typically form monogamous breeding pairs and the female spawns on a flat surface such as a leaf or stone. Both parents guard the eggs, and participate in fry raising.

== Taxonomy ==
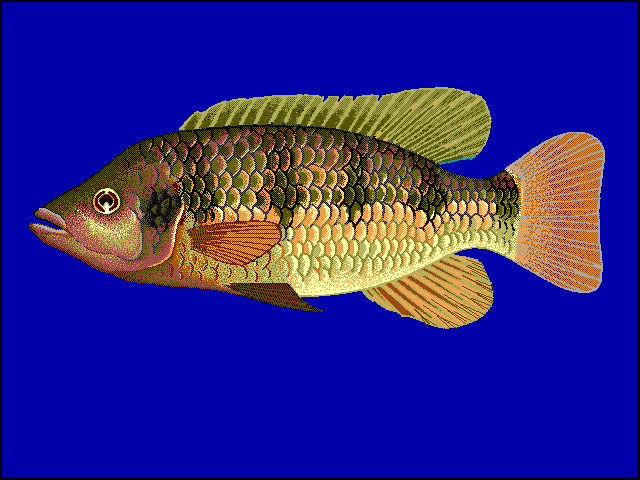
H. fasciatus, the largest species in the genus

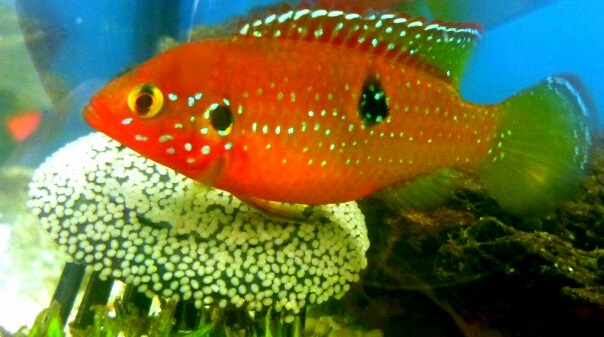
A female H. lifalili fanning her eggs

This genus consists of two distinct groups that possibly should be moved into separate genera. The first group, the so-called five-spotted cichlids (including H. elongatus, H. faciatus and H. frempongi), would remain in the genus Hemichromis, while the rest, the true jewel cichlids, would be moved to their own genus. In 2022, the new genus Rubricatochromis was described for the true jewel cichlids.

The species level taxonomy of Hemichromis is not fully resolved. Although some of the localized species are well-defined, this is not the case for all the more widespread species and several distinct color forms of unclear taxonomic status are known. For example, H. faciatus of the Nile basin and those in West Africa may belong to separate species, but H. frempongi of Lake Bosumtwi might be a synonym of H. fasciatus. H. elongatus of the Congo River basin and upper Zambezi may represent a species that is distinct from H. faciatus elsewhere, and "dwarf" populations in lakes Barombi Koto and Mboandong may also be distinct. In the Nile delta, two morphologically distinct populations apparently traditionally have been included in, but might be separate from, H. letourneuxi elsewhere in the Nile system. A comprehensive study of the genus also points to the existence of two undescribed species of jewel cichlids in the Guinea region. H. saharae was generally considered a synonym of H. letourneuxi until 2014 where a genetic study confirmed its distinction, although some have opted to retain the two as a single species. The taxonomic confusion in this genus has been further complicated by fish in the aquarium trade, where frequent misidentification, hybridization between species, and selective breeding have occurred. For example, the introduced population in Florida, which is based on aquarium fish, was identified as H. bimaculatus until the 1990s, but likely are H. letourneuxi or hybrids. A similar pattern can be seen in introduced populations elsewhere that traditionally were identified as H. bimaculatus, but likely are other species, especially H. letourneuxi.

=== Species ===
Currently, 13 recognized species are placed in this genus:

- Hemichromis angolensis Steindachner, 1865
- Hemichromis bimaculatus T. N. Gill, 1862 (jewelfish)
- Hemichromis camerounensis Bitja-Nyom, Agnèse, Pariselle, Bilong-Bilong, Gilles & Snoeks, 2021
- Hemichromis cerasogaster (Boulenger, 1899)
- Hemichromis elongatus (Guichenot, 1861) (banded jewel cichlid)
- Hemichromis exsul (Trewavas, 1933) (Turkana jewel cichlid)
- Hemichromis fasciatus W. K. H. Peters, 1857 (banded jewelfish, five-spot cichlid)
- Hemichromis frempongi Loiselle, 1979
- Hemichromis guttatus Günther, 1862
- Hemichromis letourneuxi Sauvage, 1880
- Hemichromis lifalili Loiselle, 1979
- Hemichromis saharae Sauvage, 1880
- Hemichromis stellifer Loiselle, 1979

== Aquarium care ==
Jewel cichlids are neither suited to beginners nor the usual community tank. Several young specimens may be kept in a spacious aquarium, with stones and wood for cover until a pair forms prior to breeding. Their innate aggression makes them good candidates for keeping in a monospecies aquarium, but this depends on a number of factors similar to all tropical cichlid fish - swimming and territory space, other aquatic inhabitants, diet and feeding frequency, and tank layout.

Jewel cichlids are omnivorous and eat both live foods and fish flakes.

== See also ==
- List of freshwater aquarium fish species
