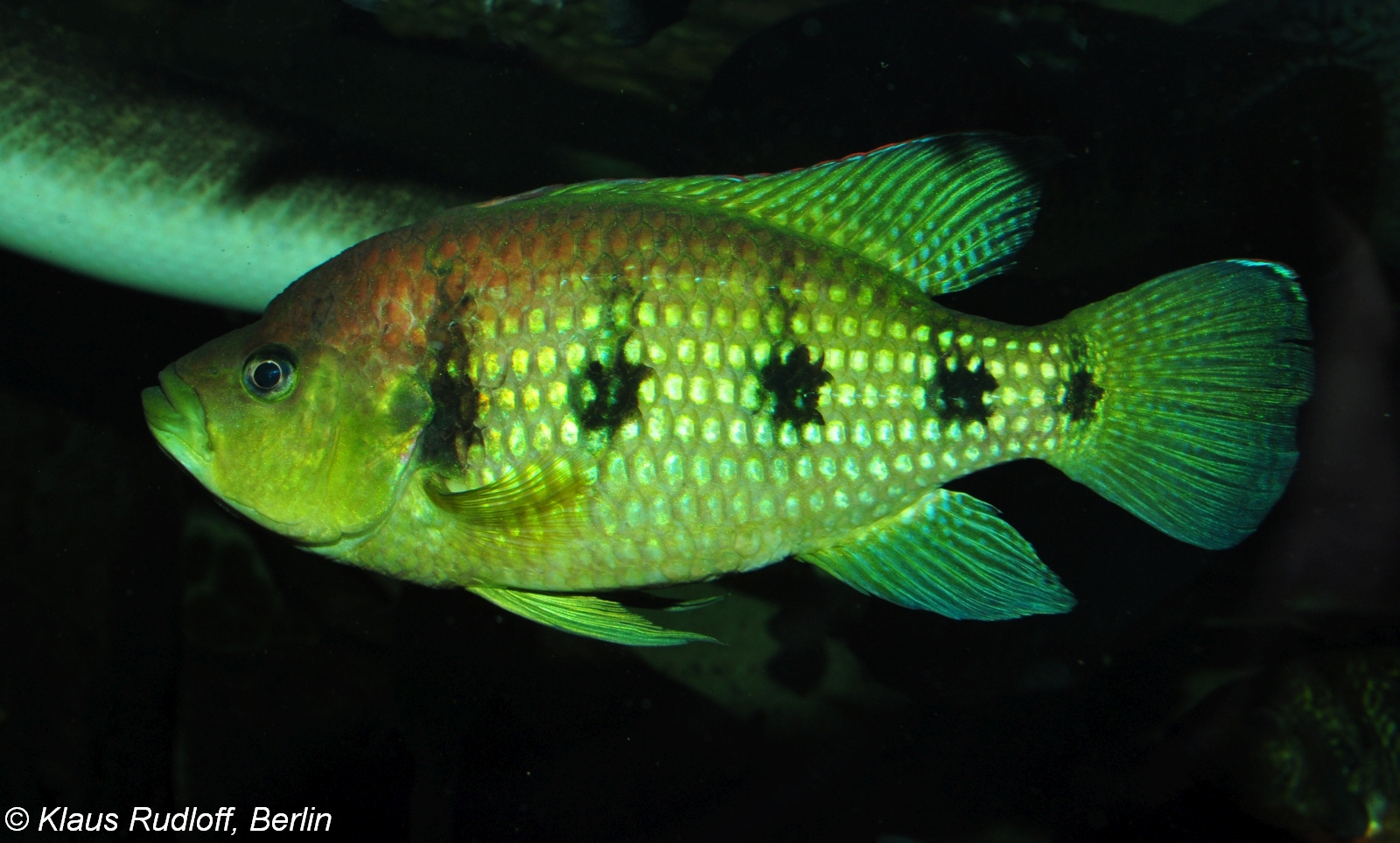

Conservation status
- Least Concern (IUCN 3.1)

Scientific classification
- Kingdom: Animalia
- Phylum: Chordata
- Class: Actinopterygii
- Order: Cichliformes
- Family: Cichlidae
- Genus: Hemichromis
- Species: H. elongatus

Binomial name
- Hemichromis elongatus (Guichenot, 1861)

= Hemichromis elongatus =

Species of fish

Hemichromis elongatus, the banded jewel cichlid, is a freshwater fish found in the Okavango River and upper Zambezi River. The fish also occurs in the Congo River system and in West Africa.
