= Southwestern North American megadrought =

Ongoing megadrought in southwestern North America that began in 2000

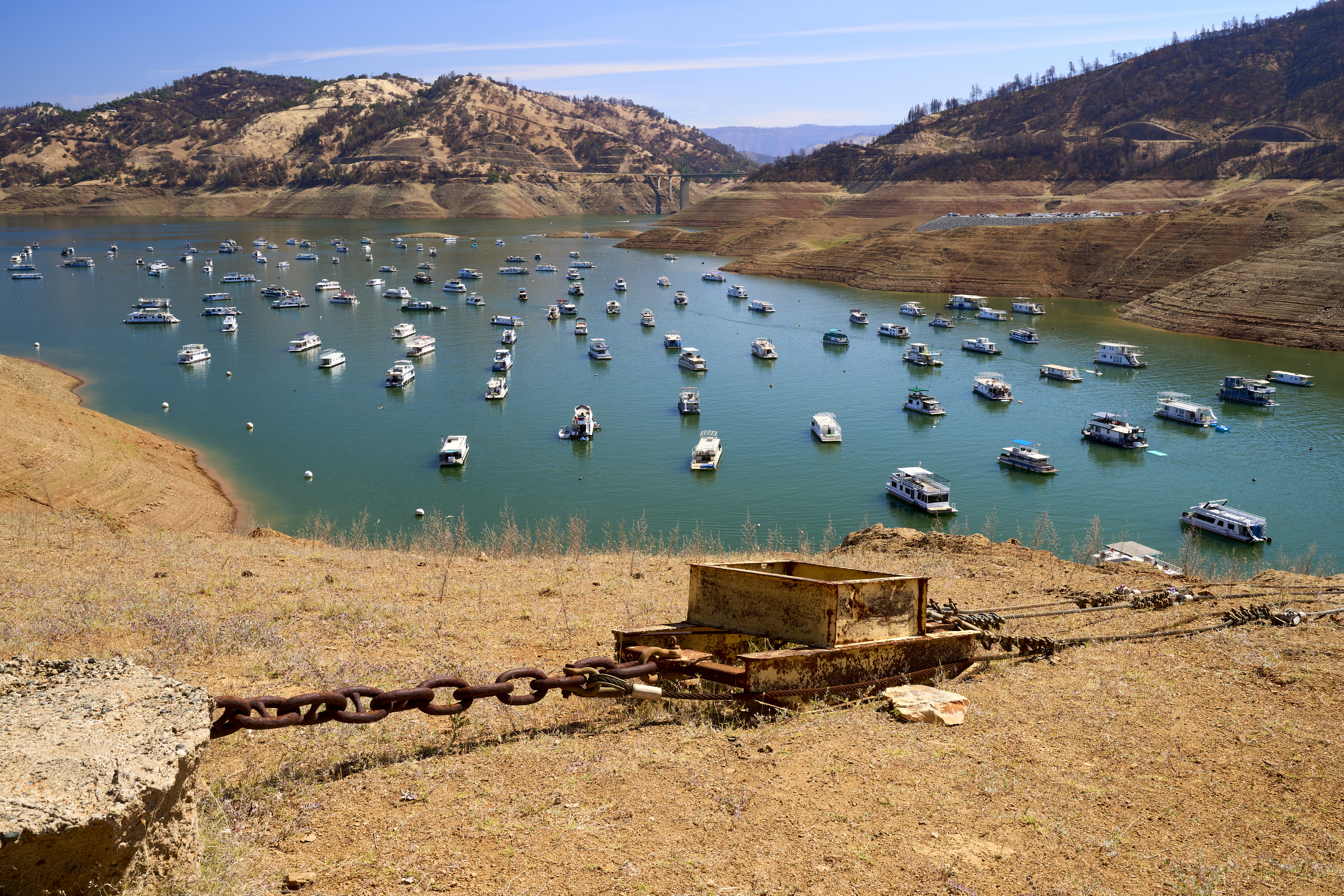
Lake Oroville, the second-largest reservoir in California, fell to a record 24% of capacity in summer 2021.

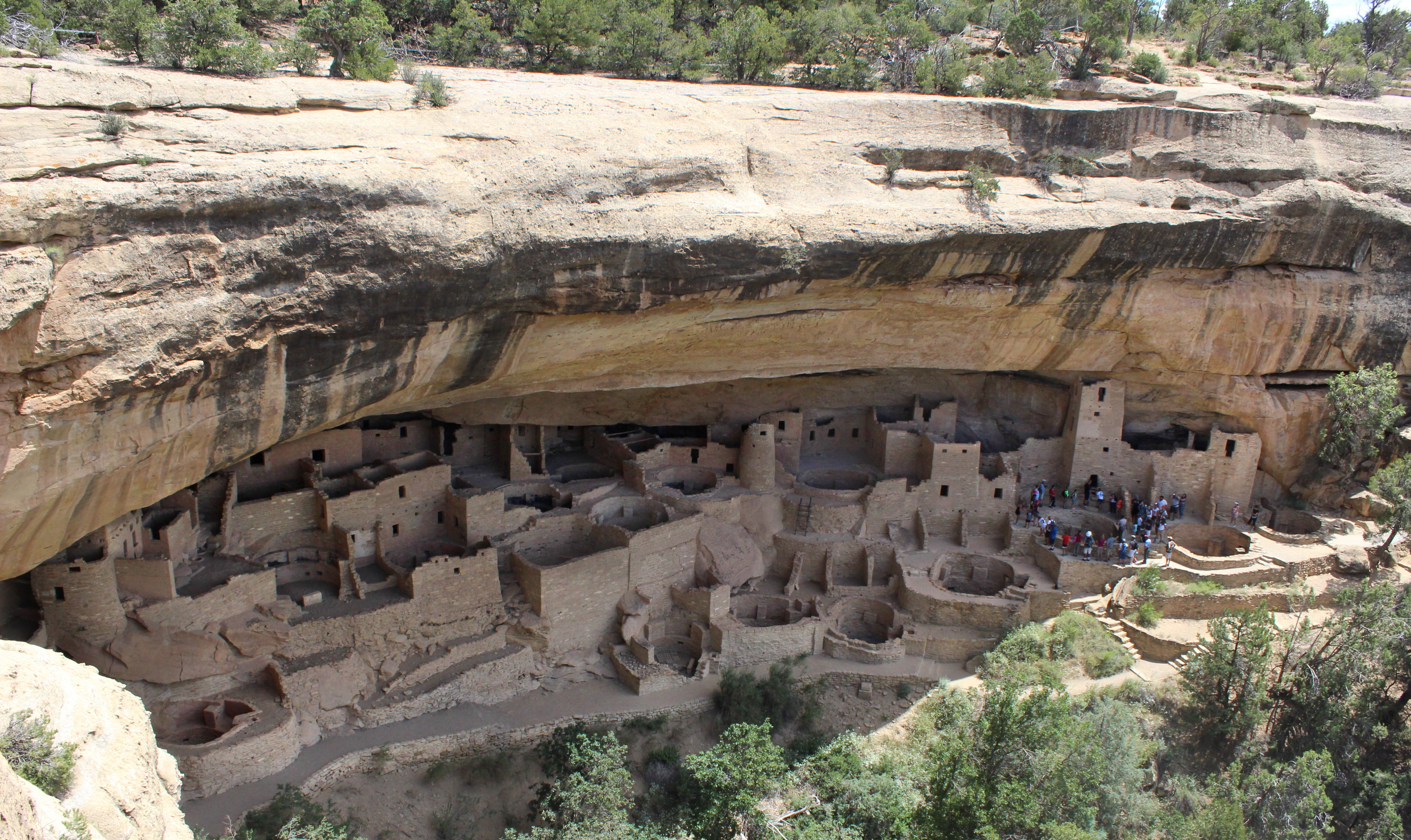
The drought that began in 1276 is hypothesized to have caused the abandonment of Cliff Palace and other Ancestral Puebloans settlements at the end of the Pueblo III Period.

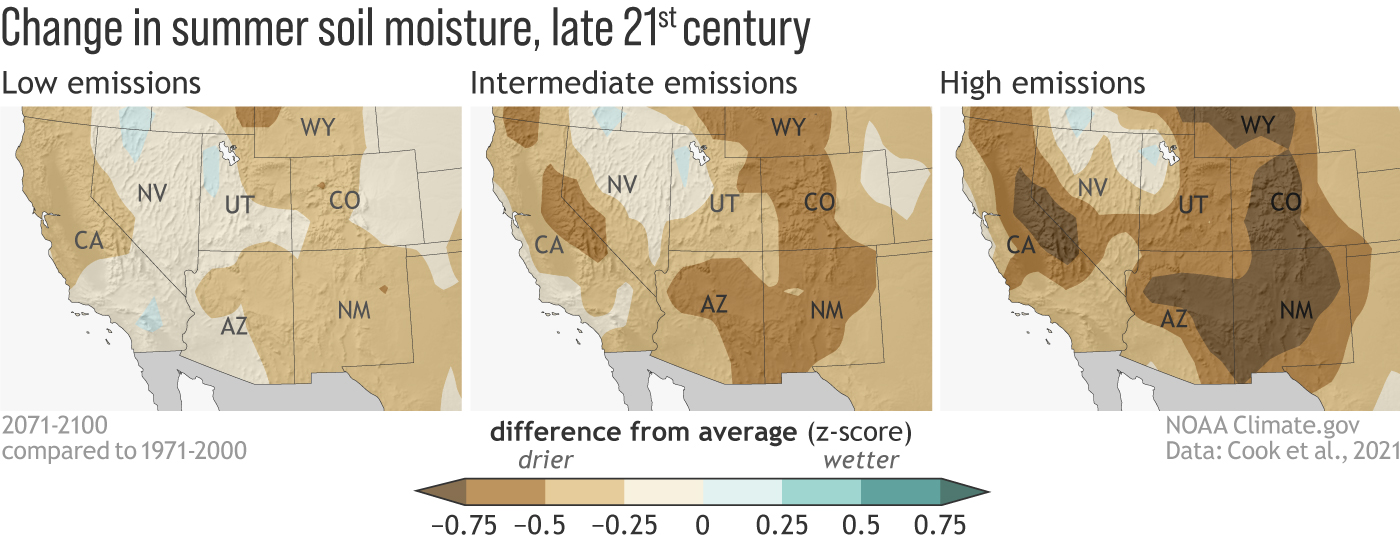
Modeled soil moisture changes at the end of the 21st century under three greenhouse gas emissions scenarios

Drought area in the United States

Drought area in California

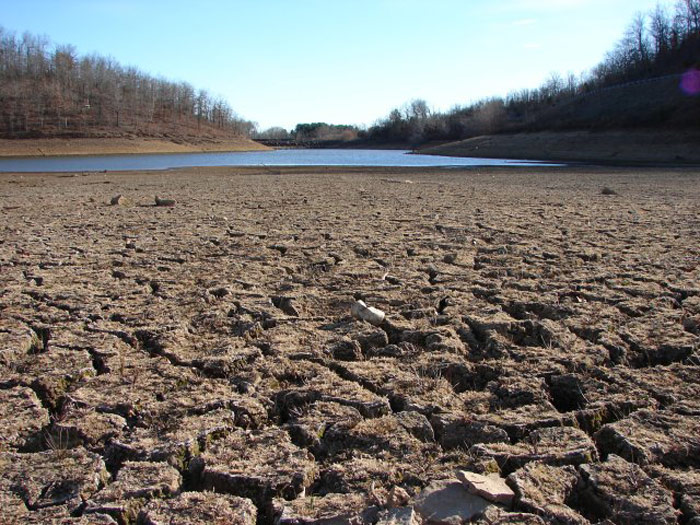
A typical dry lakebed is seen in California, which is experiencing its worst megadrought in 1,200 years, and is therefore water rationing.

The southwestern North American megadrought is an ongoing megadrought in the southwestern region of North America that began in 2000. At least 26 years in length, the drought is the driest multi-decade period the region has seen since at least 800 CE. The megadrought has prompted the declaration of a water shortage at Lake Mead, the largest reservoir in the United States. Climate change models project drier conditions in the region through the end of the 21st century.

Furthermore, global La Niña meteorological events are generally associated with drier and hotter conditions and further exacerbation of droughts in California and the Southwestern United States and to some extent Southeastern United States. Meteorological scientists have observed that La Niñas have become more frequent over time.

== Background ==
The southwestern region of North America (SWNA) is defined as the areas between 30 and 40 degrees North and 105- and 125-degrees West, comprising areas within Northern Mexico and the Southwestern United States. This area is roughly bounded by central Chihuahua to the southeast, the northwest coast of Baja California to the southwest, the Northern California coast to the northwest, and northcentral Colorado to the northeast. This area includes much of the Basin and Range Province, which contains the four deserts on the continent: the Chihuahuan Desert, the Sonoran Desert, the Mojave Desert, and the Great Basin Desert, as well as the Colorado Plateau, which is largely high desert.

Megadroughts, a term used to describe periods of multidecadal drought, are a recurring feature of the North American Southwest over the past millennium. For example, droughts lasting at least a decade occurred in Texas in each century of the past millennium. Researchers used tree ring chronologies to reconstruct summer soil moisture and snow water equivalents back to 800 CE. This allowed the identification of 40 SWNA drought events of at least 19-years duration. Of these, four megadroughts were 0.25 standard deviations drier than any experienced in the 20th century: 863–884, 1130–1151, 1276–1297, and 1571–1592. The droughts of the twelfth and thirteenth centuries bracketed the Ancestral Puebloans' Pueblo III Period, with the thirteenth century drought coinciding with the abandonment of Mesa Verde, Chaco Canyon, and other settlements in the Four Corners region. The sixteenth century megadrought may be associated with the 1576 cocoliztli epidemic in New Spain.

=== Climate change ===
The megadrought that began in 2000 was preceded by the wettest period in at least 1200 years. From 1980 to 1998, climate models begin projecting increased decadal precipitation swings in the SWNA starting in the latter half of the twentieth century as a result of climate change, but with an overall drying trend as a result of warming. Models indicate that the years 2000–2018 would have trended towards megadrought conditions regardless of climate change, with a predicted severity of the 11th worst period of drought since 800. However, anthropogenic warming pushed conditions into a severe megadrought. From 2000 to 2021, mean annual precipitation in the region was 8.3% below the 1950–1999 average and the temperature was 0.91 °C above average. The megadrought that began in 2000 was the driest 22-year period since at least 800 and, if it persists through 2022, will match the duration of the severe late-1500s megadrought. Both 2002 and 2021 were drier than any of the previous nearly 300 years and were, respectively, the 11th and 12th driest years between 800 and 2021.

The drought is largely driven by temperature, which increases the rate of evaporation, with some contribution from the lack of precipitation. The several wet years since 2000 were not sufficient to end the drought. Researchers calculated that without climate change-induced evaporation, the precipitation in 2005 would have broken the drought. While monsoon rains in the desert Southwest in mid-2021 and heavy rain and snow in California in late 2021 had raised hope of ending the drought, January 2022 was characterized by record dry conditions across much of the West. Researchers noted that even in wet years in the Colorado River watershed, water from melting snows is soaked up by dry soils before it can reach the river.

Throughout history, California has experienced many droughts, such as 1841, 1864, 1924, 1928–1935, 1947–1950, 1959–1960, 1976–1977, 1986–1992, 2006–2010, 2011–2017, 2018, and 2020- 2021. Precipitation in California is limited to a single, fairly short wet season, with the vast majority of rain and snowfall occurring in the winter months across the state. This delicate balance means that a dry rainy season can have lasting consequences. California is the most populous state and largest agricultural producer in the United States, and as such, drought in California can have a severe economic as well as environmental impact. The historical and ongoing droughts in California are caused by lack of rainfall (or snowfall), higher average temperatures, and drier air masses in the atmosphere. This leads to less water availability in the natural environment and in snowpack, rivers, and reservoirs for human use; these water shortages can have major impacts on agriculture and other water-intensive land uses.

The 2017 Fourth National Climate Assessment (NCA4) noted that, under the worst-case scenario of RCP8.5, the annual average temperature of the Southwestern United States was projected to increase 8.6 °F (4.8 °C) by 2100. The southern Southwest could receive 45 additional days per year above 90 °F (32 °C). NCA4 noted that higher temperatures increased the probability of both droughts and megadroughts in the region.

=== Deforestation in the Tropical Rainforests ===
In 2013 a group of scientists from the Princeton University published a study suggesting that total deforestation of the Amazon rainforest can strongly exacerbate drought conditions in the western states of the USA. According to the study "an Amazon stripped bare could mean 20 percent less rain for the coastal Northwest and a 50 percent reduction in the Sierra Nevada snowpack, a crucial source of water for cities and farms in California." Generally, the air in western USA from December to February will be drier.

Later studies found that "destruction of tropical forests is disrupting the movement of water in the atmosphere, causing major shifts in precipitation that could lead to drought in key agricultural areas in China, India, and the U.S. Midwest. ” Those include the 3 main tropical rainforest: Amazon, Congo, South-East Asia. 50% of the rain in the Midwest come from water evaporating from the land and the Amazon Rainforest probably providing part of it.

== Effects ==
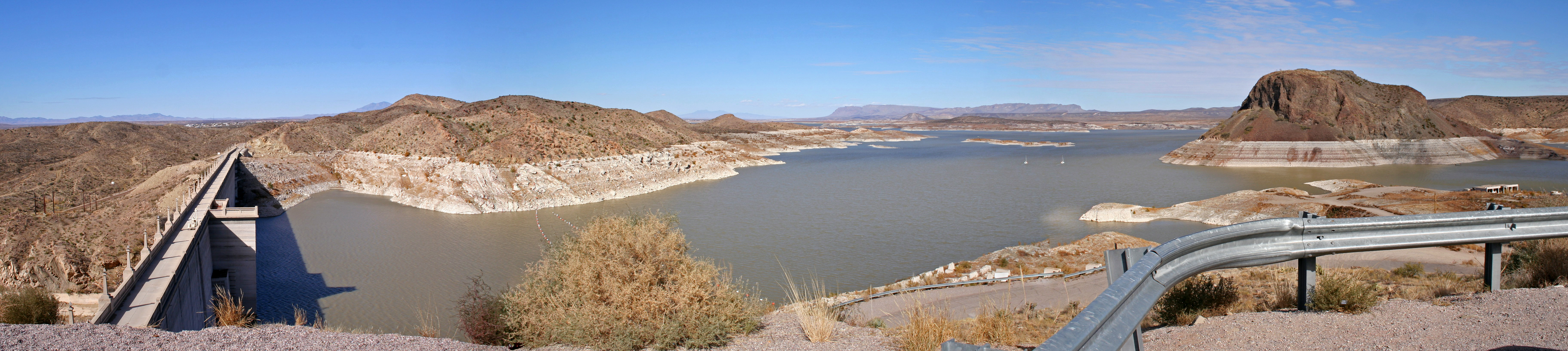
"Bathtub ring" at Elephant Butte Reservoir on the Rio Grande, the largest reservoir in the state of New Mexico, 2005

In the 21st century, the water level of Lake Mead has declined to within 100 feet (30 m) of the minimum level needed for Hoover Dam to generate electricity.

In the 21st century, the water level of Lake Powell has declined to within 30 feet (9.1 m) of the minimum level needed for Glen Canyon Dam to generate electricity.

From 2012 to 2015, the Central Valley and South Coast of California experienced dryness that was unprecedented in the instrumental record going back to 1896 and, when compared to the paleoclimate record, was the driest since at least the later sixteenth century. Some areas lost more than two years of moisture from their soils during this period. Recovery to pre-2012 soil moisture levels in the most affected areas was predicted to require several decades of average rainfall. Even without increasing temperatures, predicted low precipitation would be sufficient to produce unprecedented dry conditions, but with higher temperatures could create megadroughts as not seen since medieval times.

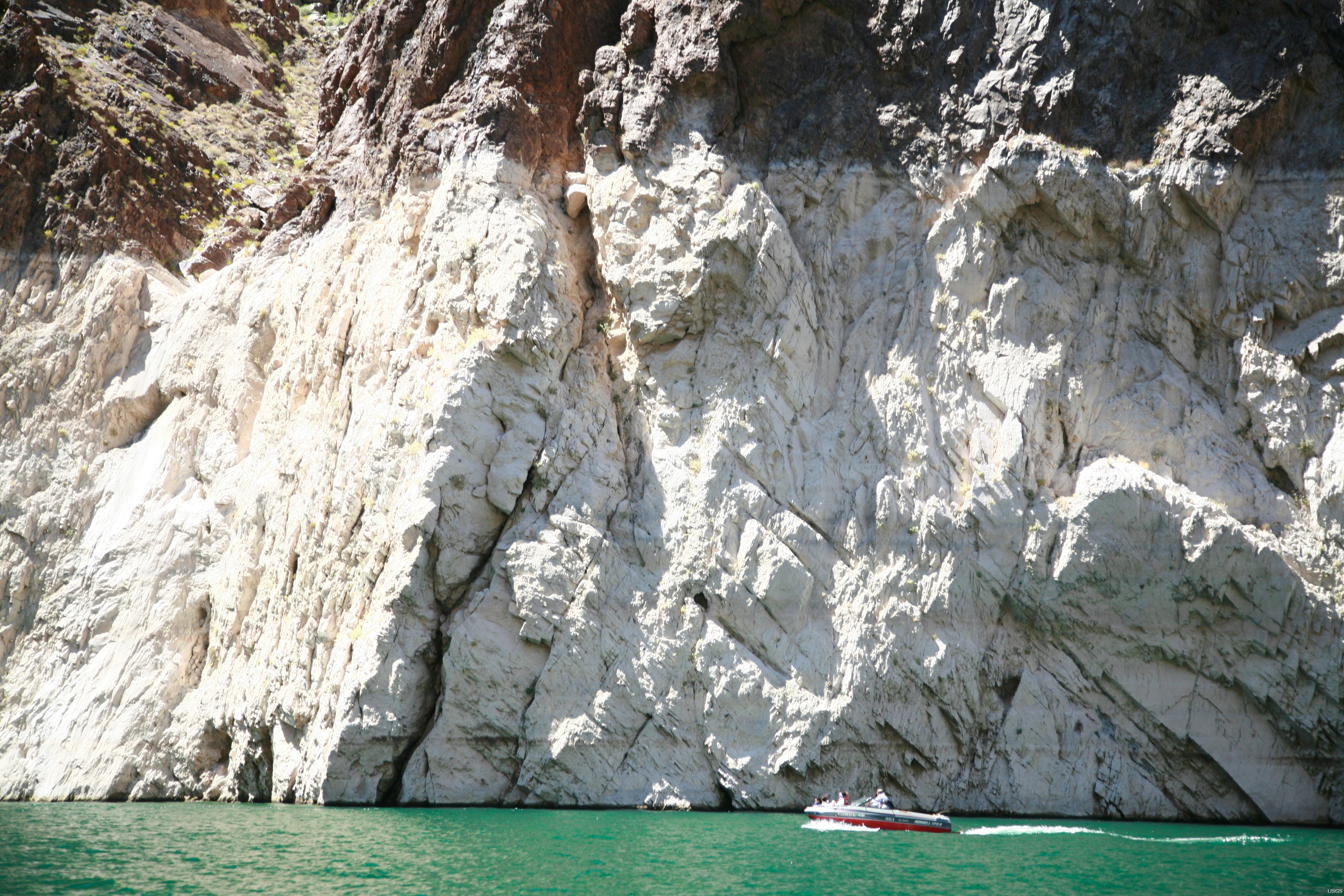
Boat showing scale, 2010

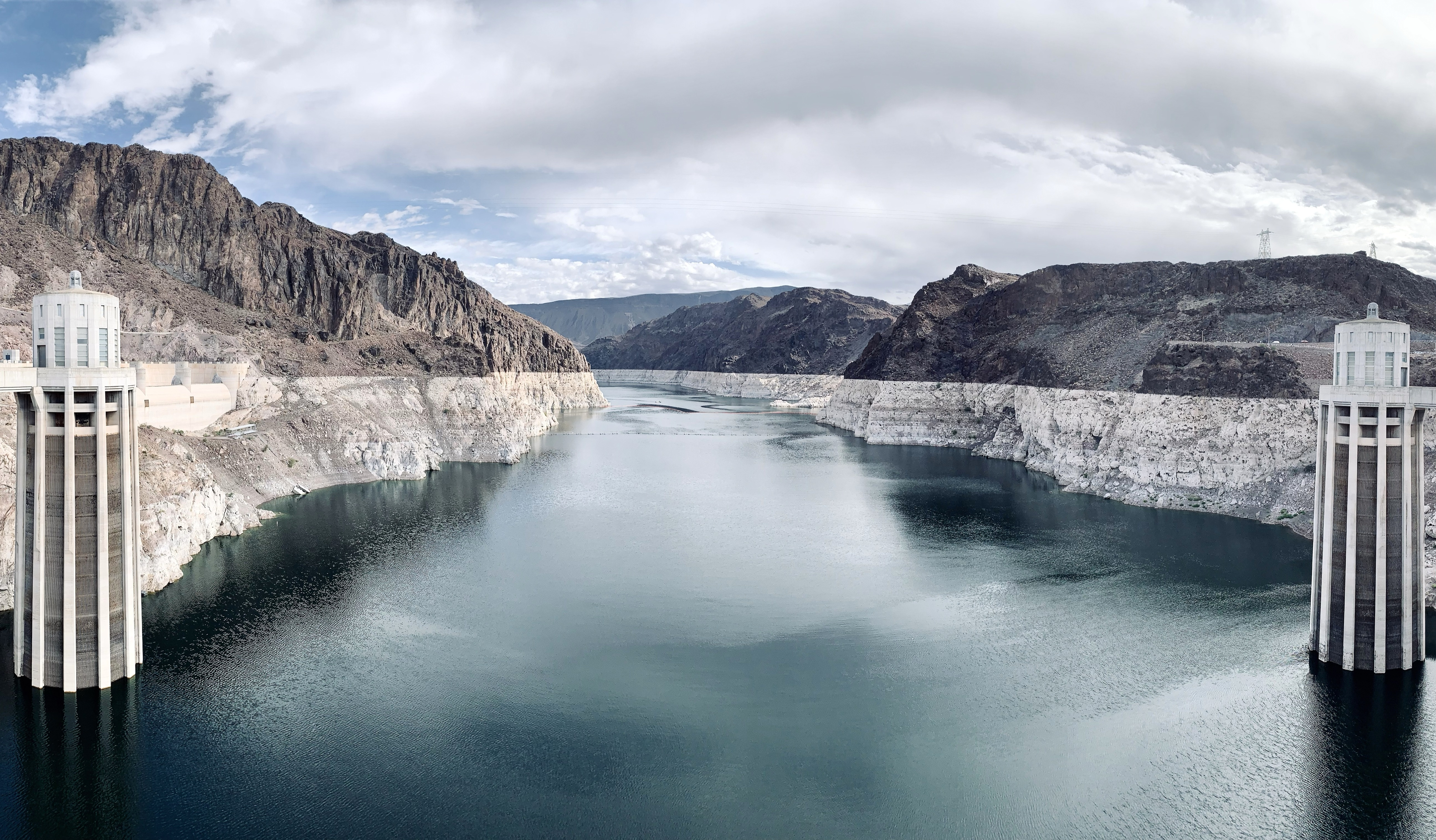
Hoover Dam intake towers, 2021

The "bathtub ring" along Lake Mead indicates the drop from historical water levels

The reduced water supplies along the Mexico–United States border area have caused tensions. The 1944 water treaty that is administered by the International Boundary and Water Commission (IBWC) divides the waters of 450,000 square miles (1,200,000 km^{2}) the Colorado River and Rio Grande basins between the two countries. However, the 1940s were a period of abnormally high precipitation; this built-in administrative deficit for subsequent years, coupled with a twentyfold increase in the population along the border, climate change, and aging water infrastructure means that there is not enough water to meet regional demand. In 2003, Mexican ambassador Alberto Szekely criticized what he saw as a focus on acts of political will to resolve water disputes and a failure to recognize that the fundamental issue was a lack of sufficient water and insufficient mechanisms for sustainable management through the IBWC. On 8 September 2020, thousands of Mexican farmers in Chihuahua, fearing for their own livelihoods, took control of the La Boquilla Dam to stop Mexican Federal authorities from releasing reservoir waters to the Rio Grande. Later that month, Texas Gov. Greg Abbott asked the Federal government to intervene to force the release of Mexican waters from the Rio Conchos that would be used by farmers in South Texas.

In March 2021, the New Mexico Interstate Stream Commission took the unprecedented step of asking farmers along the Rio Grande and Rio Chama not to farm; while agriculture uses 76% of water withdrawals in the state, it makes up 3% of the state GDP. In August 2021, the United States Bureau of Reclamation declared a water shortage at Lake Mead for the first time in its history. This followed a forecast that, by the end of 2021, Lake Mead would be reduced to a level not seen since the building of the Hoover Dam in the 1930s. Lake Mead is one of the main reservoirs of the Colorado River and the declaration triggers cuts to the water supply for farmers in Arizona, Nevada, and New Mexico. Without an alleviation of the drought conditions, The New York Times stated that further cuts affecting the 40 million people who rely upon the Colorado River for water were likely. It was anticipated that the cuts would prompt some farmers to increase pumping of limited groundwater supplies. In August 2021, the Edward Hyatt Power Plant, which provides hydroelectric power to up to 800,000 homes in California, was forced to shut down for the first time after waters at Lake Oroville fell to 24% of capacity, a historic low. In February 2022, the Bureau of Reclamation released projections for Lake Powell, the second largest artificial reservoir in the United States; the lower range of forecasts would result in a water level by the end of 2022 that would prohibit hydroelectric generation at the Glen Canyon Dam, which provides enough power for 400,000 homes. In 2023, the drought situation on the Colorado River remains dire. Some states that rely on the river for water supplies have been required by the US Bureau of Reclamation to reduce their annual allocations. Arizona saw the steepest cuts, losing nearly 20 percent of its annual allocation.

A 2021 study noted that increased drought conditions were now inevitable for the region, but that the most extreme modeled effects can still be avoided by climate change mitigation. However, climate change adaptation to the drier conditions will be needed. Dave D. White of Arizona State University, the lead author of the Southwest Chapter of the Fifth National Climate Assessment to be published in 2023, called for "bold solutions that match the scale of the challenges," including agricultural water conservation, coastal water desalination, technology innovations, and sustainable water management. The Santa Fe New Mexican called for New Mexico to learn from the driest counties how to conserve water and start preparing for a drier and hotter future.

Importation of water from the Missouri River has also been proposed.

Peer-reviewed studies indicate that storing water in Lake Mead rather than in Lake Powell would yield a savings of 300,000 acre feet of water or more per year, leading to calls by environmentalists to drain Lake Powell and restore Glen Canyon to its natural, free-flowing state.
