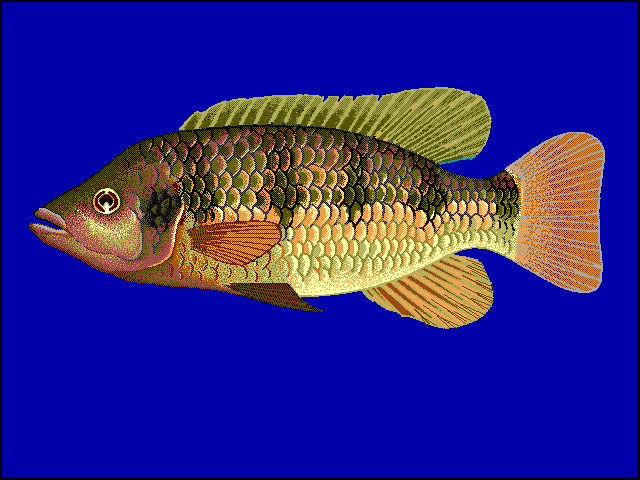

Conservation status
- Least Concern (IUCN 3.1)

Scientific classification
- Kingdom: Animalia
- Phylum: Chordata
- Class: Actinopterygii
- Order: Cichliformes
- Family: Cichlidae
- Genus: Hemichromis
- Species: H. fasciatus

Binomial name
- Hemichromis fasciatus W.K.H. Peters, 1857

= Hemichromis fasciatus =

Species of fish

Hemichromis fasciatus, also called the banded jewelfish and five-spot cichlid, is a species of fish in the cichlid family. It is distributed throughout West Africa. It can also be found in the Nile Basin, Lake Chad, and the upper Zambezi. It can reach a total length of up to 26.5 cm (10.4 in) and a standard length of 20.4 cm (8.0 in).

== Description ==
The banded jewelfish is yellow-green with a bronze iridescence and has five large, black, glossy oval patches on the side of the body. Older specimens have a brick-red dot on each scale. The mouth is large and wide. They are incredibly aggressive and will act like any other Jewelfish. If keeping these animals in an aquarium, your best chance is a large tank (75 gallon+), and with plenty of cover. Limit the selection of fish to one large adult or several small juveniles. Keep in mind you will have to separate them once they get too big, or they will kill each other.
