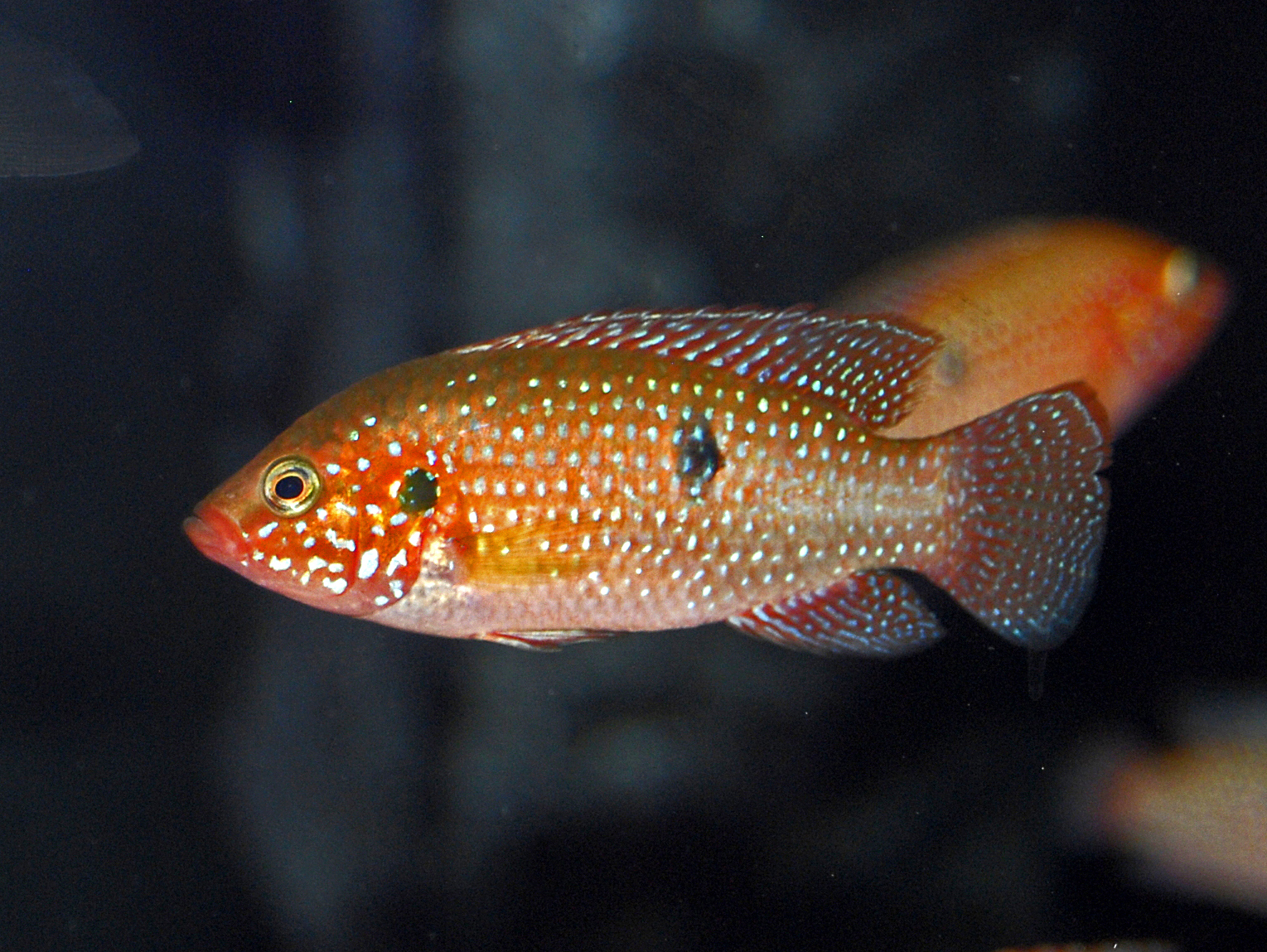
- Hemichromis lifalili

Conservation status
- Least Concern (IUCN 3.1)

Scientific classification
- Kingdom: Animalia
- Phylum: Chordata
- Class: Actinopterygii
- Order: Cichliformes
- Family: Cichlidae
- Genus: Hemichromis
- Species: H. lifalili

Binomial name
- Hemichromis lifalili Loiselle, 1979

Synonyms
- Hemichromis bimaculatus (non Gill, 1862)

= Hemichromis lifalili =

Species of fish

Hemichromis lifalili, common name blood-red jewel cichlid, is a species of fish in the family Cichlidae.

== Description ==
Hemichromis lifalili can grow up to 8.2–10 cm (3.2–3.9 in) long. It is red-orange or bright red with rows of small blue spots all over the body, head, and fins. Two dark spots are present on the sides, the first on the opercle, the second in the middle of the body, while it lacks the dark spot at the base of the tail present in Hemichromis bimaculatus.

In the mating period, almost the whole body is red. Outside the spawning season, adult males and females can be distinguished mainly by their body shape. The females are much leaner and show a brighter red. The males are much stronger and have a more massive head than females.

== Diet ==
These fishes mainly feeds on worms, crustaceans, insects, and small fish, but also on vegetable matter.

== Reproduction ==
This species, as the more common and congener Hemichromis bimaculatus, is a popular aquarium fish, and it is widespread commercially for breeding in the aquarium. Reproduction is quite simple and it is carried easily in captivity.

Usually, the female lays about 400 eggs on a stone and the male immediately fertilizes them. At a temperature of 25.5 °C, after 48 hours they hatch. After five and a half days, the fry swim freely and are led mainly by the female, while the male is mainly engaged in the defense of the territory.

== Distribution and habitat ==
This species is present in the Democratic Republic of the Congo, the Lower and Central Congo River basin, except from the Shaba (Katanga) and Kasaï regions. These fish prefer rocky and warm watercourses (22–24 °C). In oxygen-depleted waters, rapids, and swampy habitats, this species is missing.
