= Connie Woodhouse =

Hydrologist

Connie A. Woodhouse
- Education: University of Arizona
- Scientific career
- Thesis: Climate variability in the Southwestern United States as reconstructed from tree-ring chronologies (1996)

Connie A. Woodhouse is a regents professor at the University of Arizona who is known for her use of tree rings to reconstruct the hydroclimate of the past, especially in western North America. In 2022 she was elected a fellow of the American Geophysical Union

== Education and career ==
Woodhouse has a B.A. from Prescott College (1979), an M.S. from the University of Utah (1989), and a Ph.D. from the University of Arizona (1996). Following her Ph.D., Woodhouse worked at the University of Colorado Boulder until 2007 when she moved to the University of Arizona as an associate professor. In 2013 she was named professor in the School of Geography and Development, and in 2020 she was named a regents professor.

== Research ==
Woodhouse's early research examined the long-term variability in drought conditions in the United States. She has used dating with tree rings to examine the flow of water and snow levels in Colorado. Her research extends into considerations of air temperature, the efficiency of stream runoff, and flash droughts. Her work on droughts in the past has indicated the potential of Dust Bowl conditions in the future. Thus, her work on past climate has implication for the future impact of drought conditions

== Selected publications ==
- Cook, Edward R.; Woodhouse, Connie A.; Eakin, C. Mark; Meko, David M.; Stahle, David W. (2004-11-05). "Long-Term Aridity Changes in the Western United States". Science. 306 (5698): 1015–1018. Bibcode:2004Sci...306.1015C. doi:10.1126/science.1102586. ISSN 0036-8075. PMID 15472040. S2CID 20059159.
- Park Williams, A.; Allen, Craig D.; Macalady, Alison K.; Griffin, Daniel; Woodhouse, Connie A.; Meko, David M.; Swetnam, Thomas W.; Rauscher, Sara A.; Seager, Richard; Grissino-Mayer, Henri D.; Dean, Jeffrey S.; Cook, Edward R.; Gangodagamage, Chandana; Cai, Michael; McDowell, Nate G. (2013). "Temperature as a potent driver of regional forest drought stress and tree mortality". Nature Climate Change. 3 (3): 292–297. Bibcode:2013NatCC...3..292P. doi:10.1038/nclimate1693. ISSN 1758-678X. S2CID 2965205.
- Woodhouse, Connie A.; Overpeck, Jonathan T. (1998-12-01). "2000 Years of Drought Variability in the Central United States". Bulletin of the American Meteorological Society. 79 (12): 2693–2714. Bibcode:1998BAMS...79.2693W. doi:10.1175/1520-0477(1998)079<2693:YODVIT>2.0.CO;2. ISSN 0003-0007.
- Woodhouse, Connie A.; Gray, Stephen T.; Meko, David M. (2006). "Updated streamflow reconstructions for the Upper Colorado River Basin: Updated Colorado River Reconstructions". Water Resources Research. 42 (5). doi:10.1029/2005WR004455. S2CID 18943306.
- Cook, Edward R.; Seager, Richard; Heim, Richard R.; Vose, Russell S.; Herweijer, Celine; Woodhouse, Connie (2010). "Megadroughts in North America: placing IPCC projections of hydroclimatic change in a long-term palaeoclimate context". Journal of Quaternary Science. 25 (1): 48–61. Bibcode:2010JQS....25...48C. doi:10.1002/jqs.1303. S2CID 6284644.

== Awards and honors ==
In 2016, Woodhouse received the José A. Boninsegna Frontiers in Dendrochronology Award in recognition of her work in reconstructing past climates and for sharing this information with people who manage water resources. In 2022 Woodhouse was elected a fellow of the American Geophysical Union.
