= Lake Bosumtwi =

Crater lake in Ghana

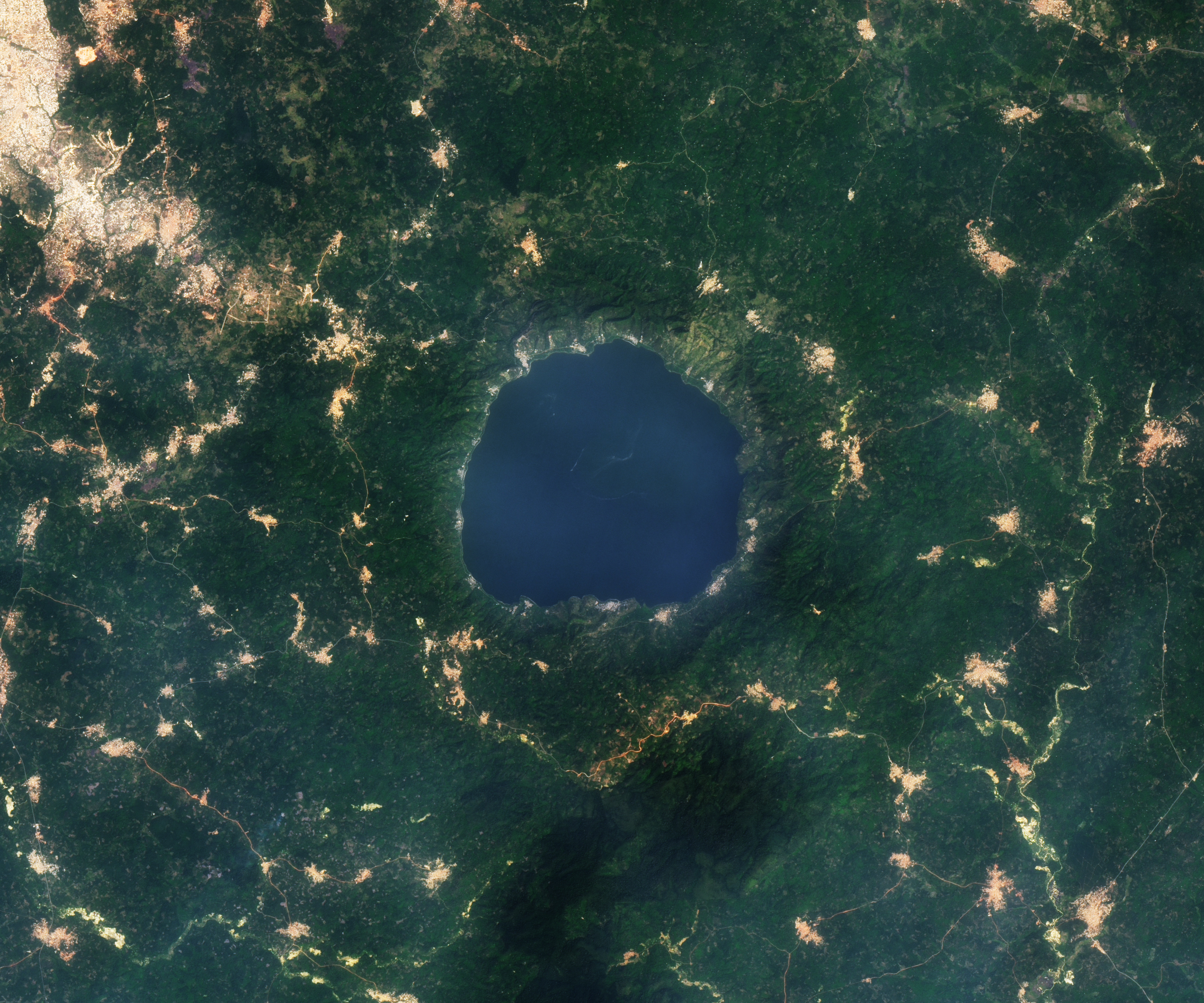
- Satellite image of Lake Bosumtwi

- Location within Ghana Location within Africa
- Location: Ashanti
- Coordinates: 06°30′20″N 01°24′33″W
- Type: Ancient lake, Impact crater lake 1.07 million years old
- Primary inflows: rainfall
- Primary outflows: none
- Catchment area: 400 km^{2} (150 sq mi)
- Basin countries: Ghana
- Max. length: 8.6 km (5.3 mi)
- Max. width: 8.1 km (5.0 mi)
- Surface area: 49 km^{2} (19 sq mi)
- Average depth: 45 m (148 ft)
- Max. depth: 81 m (266 ft)
- Surface elevation: 150 m (490 ft)

Lake Bosomtwe, also spelled Bosumtwi, is the only natural lake in Ghana. It is situated within an ancient impact crater that is about 10.5 kilometres (6.5 mi) in diameter. It is about 30 km (19 mi) south-east of Kumasi, the capital of Ashanti, and is a popular recreational area. There are about 30 villages near the crater lake of Lake Bosomtwe, with a combined population of about 70,000. The most popular amongst the villages where tourists usually settle is Abono.

The Ashanti consider Bosomtwe a sacred lake. According to traditional belief, the souls of the dead come here to bid farewell to the goddess Asase Ya. Because of this, it is considered permissible to fish in the lake only from wooden planks. Among the fish species in the lake is the endemic cichlid Hemichromis frempongi, and the near-endemic cichlids Tilapia busumana and T. discolor.

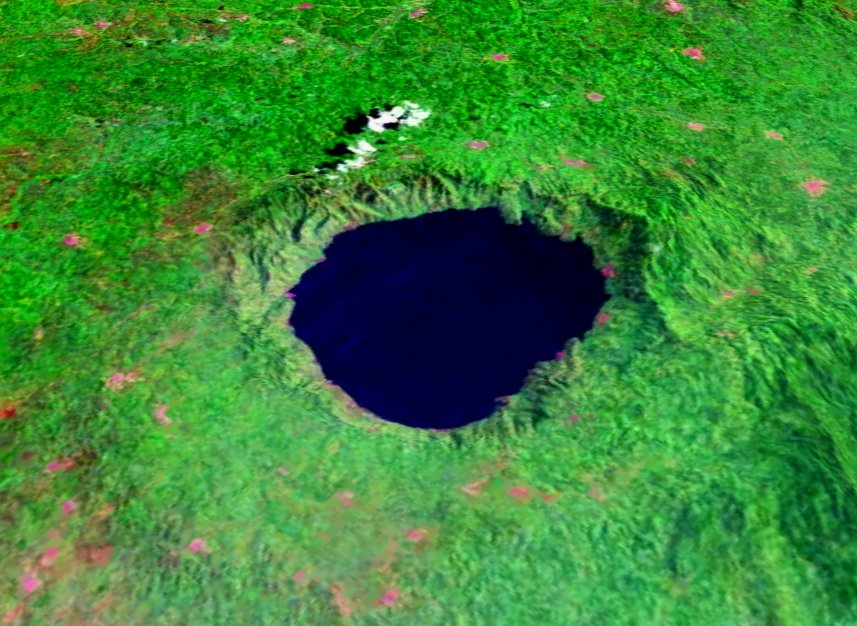
Oblique view with 3x vertical exaggeration

== Impact crater ==
Bosumtwi crater
- Location within Africa
- Location: Ghana

Impact crater structure
- Confidence: Confirmed
- Diameter: 10.5 km (6.5 mi)
- Depth: 380 m (1,250 ft) (exposed); 750 m (2,460 ft) (original, incl. sediments)
- Age: 1.07 Ma

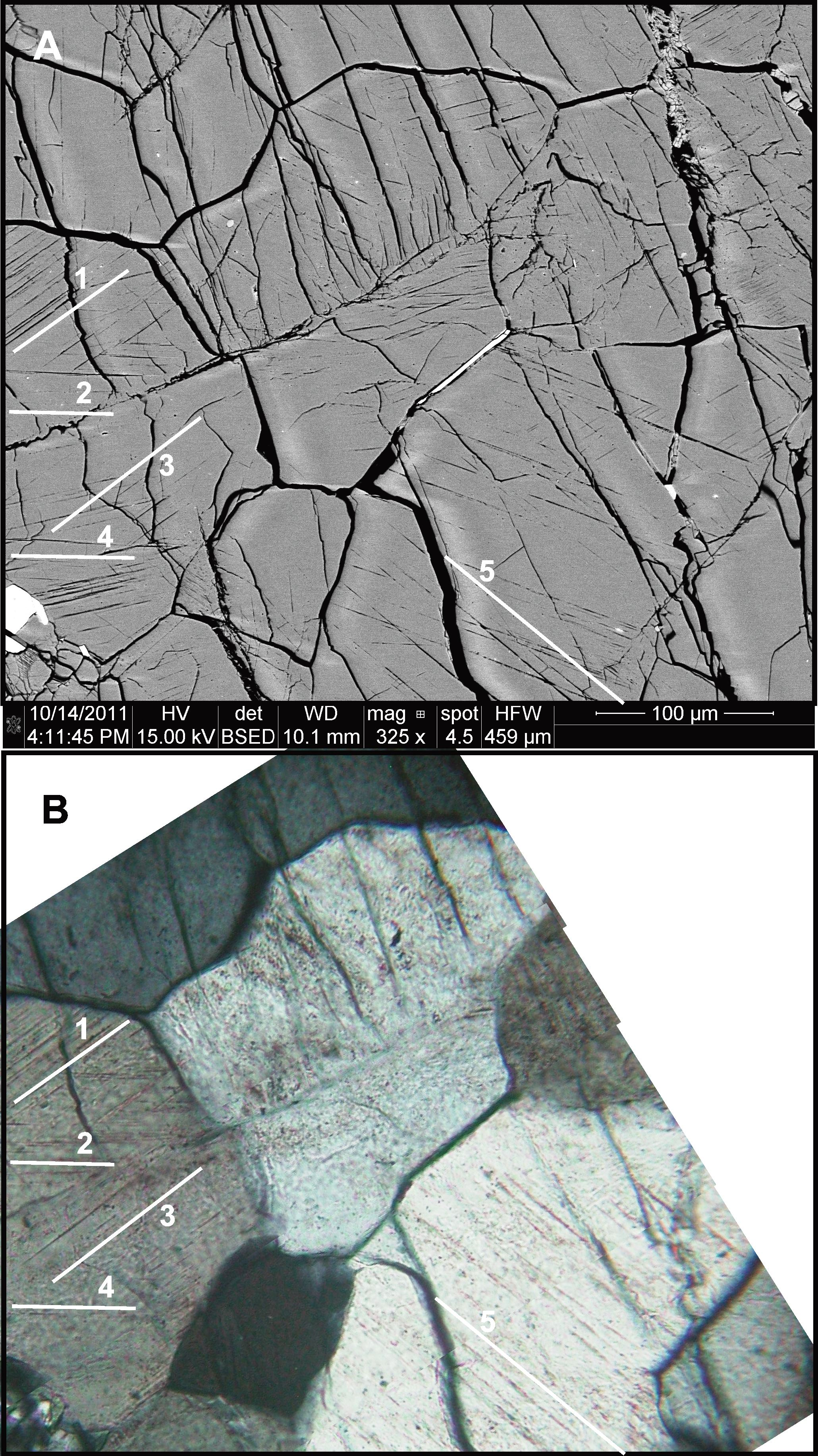
Planar deformation features from the Bosumtwi impact crater visible under the optical and scanning electron microscope.

The Lake Bosomtwe impact crater is 10.5 km (6.5 mi) in diameter, slightly larger than the present lake which is approximately 8 km (5.0 mi) across, and is estimated to be 1.07 million years old (Pleistocene period).

The depth of crater is approximately 380 m (1,250 ft), but, if counted together with the depth of lake sediments - 750 m (2,460 ft).

The crater has been partly eroded, and is situated in dense rainforest, making it difficult to study and confirm its origin by meteorite impact. Shock features such as shatter cones are largely overgrown by vegetation or covered by the lake. However, drilling of the crater's central uplift beneath the lake floor has recently provided an abundance of shocked materials for scientific study. Tektites, believed to be from this impact, are found in the neighbouring country of Ivory Coast, and related microtektites have been found in deep sea sediments west of the African continent.

A work based on a statistical study of past numerical orbital simulations of the impact event asserts that the possible origin of the impactor is an asteroid coming from the middle main-belt at a high inclination (>17 degrees).

== Climate history ==
Before the asteroid impact, the area was a lush rainforest filled with animals. Following the impact, the resulting crater filled with water forming Lake Bosomtwe.

Periods of heavy rainfall filled the crater with water, causing the lake level to rise above the lowest points of the rim. Such periods are evidenced from fossils of fish found on hilltops. Water even flowed from the basin through an overflow channel. However, there were also times when the water level was so low that the rainforest entered the basin rendering the lake only a small pond. Such a period, according to legend and now proved by paleoclimate records, lasted until about 300 years ago.

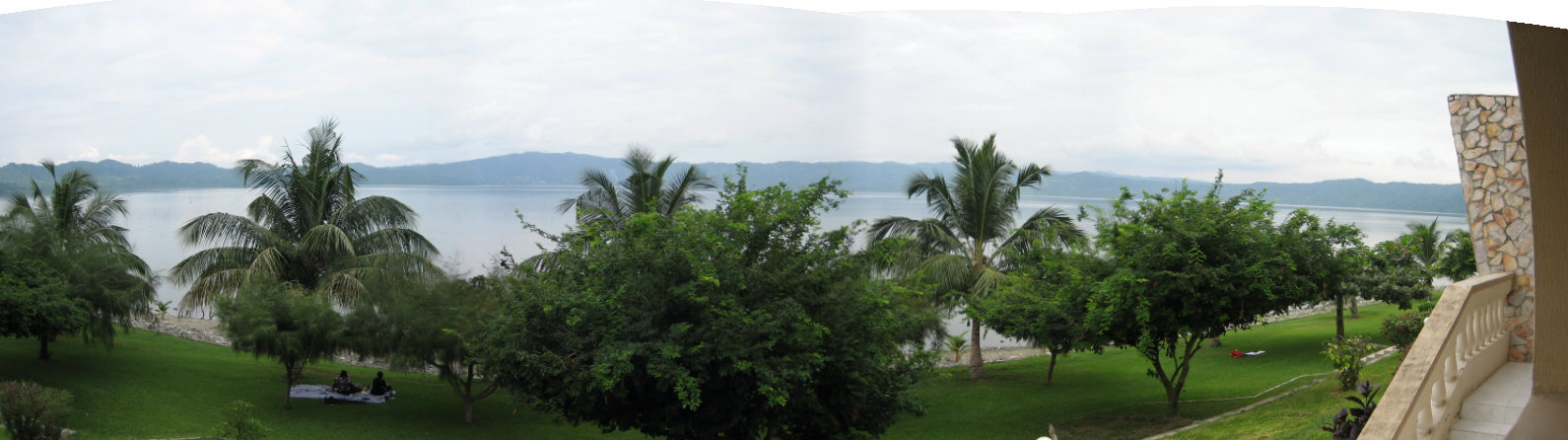
Panorama of Lake Bosomtwe

== See also ==
- Lake Iro – another African lake suspected to be an impact crater
