= Shell dwellers =

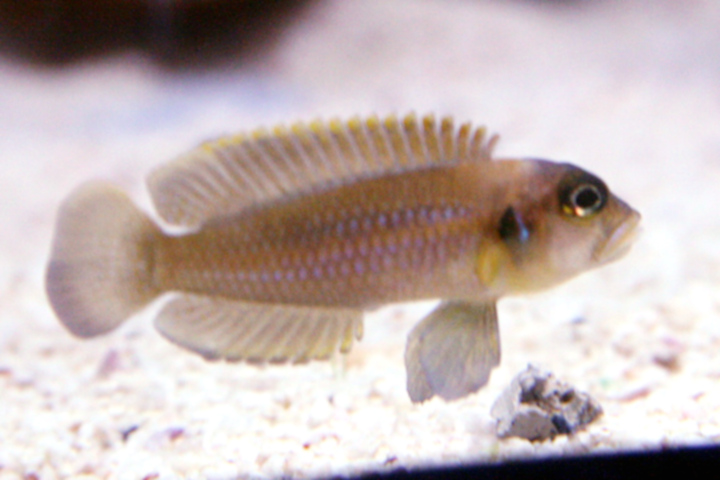
A shell-dwelling Lamprologus ocellatus.

The terms shell dwellers or shelldwellers, shell-breeding, or ostracophil are descriptive terms for cichlid fish that use the empty shells of aquatic snails as sites for breeding and shelter. The terms have no taxonomic basis, although most shell-dwelling cichlids are from Lake Tanganyikas lamprologine lineage. Many shell dwelling cichlids are popular with fishkeepings and are frequently kept in aquaria.

== Shell origins ==
In Lake Tanganyika the shells inhabited are from the genus Neothauma, while shells used by Pseudotropheus lanisticola in Lake Malawi are from genus Lanistes.

Shell Dwelling Cichlids Around 24 species of lamprologine cichlids use abandoned shells for shelter and breeding in Lake Tanganyika. Most, however, are not obligate shell-breeding cichlids and will spawn in other caves or crevices.

== Types of shell dwellers ==
There are several groups the shell dwellers can be placed into:

- Colonial shell dwellers. Quite popular for their familial behavior, these fish are native to or, in some cases, create their own shellbeds, with piles of dense shells. Species include Neolamprologus multifasciatus, Neolamprologus similis and Neolamprologus callipterus
- The ocellatus group has the most attractively patterned and many of the most aggressive of the shell-dwelling species, which share a similar body shape and territorial behavior. It has been said that if sharks behaved as this group does, the world's beaches would be abandoned. Species include Lamprologus ocellatus, Lamprologus stappersi, Lamprologus speciosus, and several species much more rare to the hobby.
- The Lepidiolamprologus group, now considered Neolamprologus species. These are larger shell dwellers and some may prefer mud-dwelling in the wild. They include Neolamprologus boulengeri, Neolamprologus hecqui, Neolamprologus variostigma and Neolamprologus meeli.
- The Altolamprologus varieties include Altolamprologus compressiceps "Sumbu" and other locational varieties that remain smaller than the normal A. compressiceps in order to use shells.
- The genus Telmatochromis contains one definite shell dweller, Telmatochromis sp "temporalis shell," and many species that will shell-dwell in captivity.
- The brevis group contains a number of species with heavy bodies and gentle temperaments, including Neolamprologus brevis and Neolamprologus calliurus.
- The signatus group contains slim, reflective species, including Neolamprologus signatus, Neolamprologus ornatippinnis and Neolamprologus kungweensis.
- The Malawi shell dwellers, which may comprise several species, but currently has only one certain species assigned to it, Pseudotropheus lanisticola, which is one of the smallest mbuna in Lake Malawi at a bare 7 cm.

== Range ==
Shell dwellers are found throughout Lake Tanganyika, along the coasts of Zambia, Democratic Republic of Congo, Burundi and Tanzania.

== Diet ==
Shell dwellers are carnivores that primarily feed on zooplankton and other microscopic and near-microscopic foods.

Cichlids' distinctive pharyngeal teeth, in the throat of the fish, are present in shell dwellers, though small. Armed with those and the usual teeth along with the typical dissolving qualities of water shell dwellers can eat a variety of foods in the wild and in captivity. Many species have been known to pull small snails from their shells to eat, to catch and devour the fry of other fish, and to go after small crustaceans.

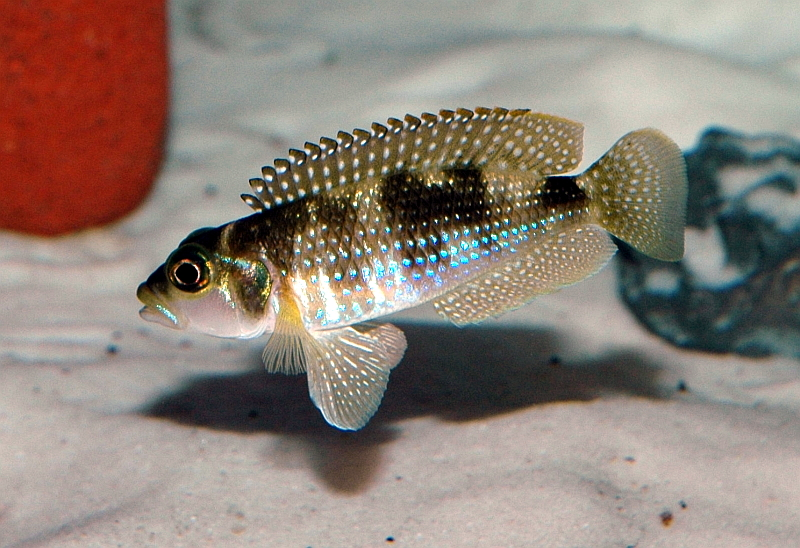
A shell-dwelling male Lamprologus stappersi displays his dominance.

== Reproduction ==
As with other cichlids they protect their young, and the distinctive shell-dwelling provides them with a defensible nursery.

Generally eggs are laid by the female within the shell and fertilized as she lays them or immediately after by the male.

The female will protect the shell, fanning her pectoral fins to keep the internal water oxygenated, and often rearranging the substrate to create barriers or to hide the shell from predators.

Eggs hatch within 48 hours, dependent primarily on temperature, and the yolk sac is absorbed within five days. Fry typically emerge from the shell a week after spawning, although they remain quite benthic for days or weeks after their emergence.

== Shell dwellers as aquarium fish ==
The Malawi shell dweller, Pseudotropheus lanisticola, was first identified in 1964 along with many other mbuna in that lake, but the Tanganyikan shell dwellers were found primarily in the late 1970s and early 1980s. Altolamprologus compressiceps was identified in 1958 but the shell-dwelling varieties were found much later.

The shell-dwelling species' needs are very similar. The basic aquarium setup and equipment are appropriate with a few changes. First, the substrate should be sand. Many of the species are very accomplished diggers and for security may bury all or part of a shell, use sand as a territorial barrier, or generally amuse the owner by spitting, sifting, or throwing it. Second, hard, alkaline water must be provided, which should also be kept free of ammonia and nitrites and with low nitrates. Finally, appropriate shells must be provided. Common shells used for shell dwellers include authentic Neothauma shells, ocean turbo shells, escargot shells, whale eye shells, and Ampullariidae-family shells. Shells must be of an appropriate size for the species, have a round opening, and have open coils. Numbers of shells will vary; for colonial species, hundreds may be ideal. For brevis types, a single shell per pair is often representative.

== See also ==
- Cichlid
- List of freshwater aquarium fish species
