= Neolamprologus ornatipinnis =

Conservation status
- Least Concern (IUCN 3.1)

Scientific classification
- Kingdom: Animalia
- Phylum: Chordata
- Class: Actinopterygii
- Order: Cichliformes
- Family: Cichlidae
- Genus: Neolamprologus
- Species: N. ornatipinnis

Binomial name
- Neolamprologus ornatipinnis (Poll, 1949)

Synonyms
- Lamprologus ornatipinnis

Species of fish

Neolamprologus ornatipinnis is a species of cichlid endemic to Lake Tanganyika, where it prefers areas with sandy substrates or, sometimes, rocky areas. While not a shell dweller like many of its congeners, it does use shells (and possibly rock crevices) for spawning. This species can reach a length of 7.8 centimetres (3.1 in) TL. This species can also be found in the aquarium trade.
