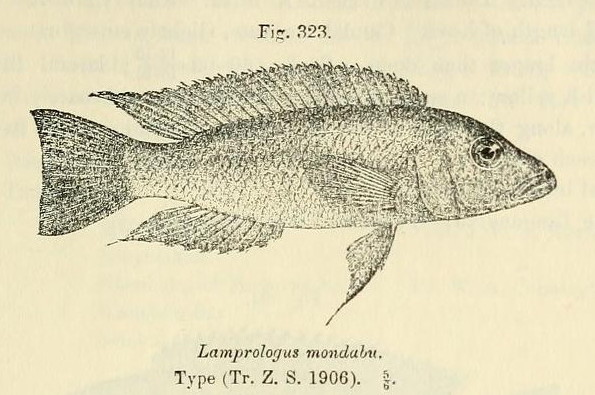

Conservation status
- Least Concern (IUCN 3.1)

Scientific classification
- Kingdom: Animalia
- Phylum: Chordata
- Class: Actinopterygii
- Order: Cichliformes
- Family: Cichlidae
- Genus: Neolamprologus
- Species: N. mondabu

Binomial name
- Neolamprologus mondabu (Boulenger, 1906)

Synonyms
- Lamprologus mondabu Boulenger, 1906

= Neolamprologus mondabu =

Species of fish

Neolamprologus mondabu is a species of cichlid endemic to Lake Tanganyika except for the southern portion where it is replaced by N. modestus. It prefers areas with rocky substrates, moving to areas with sandy substrates to breed. It feeds on the eggs of Lamprichthys tanganicanus. This species can reach a length of 10.7 centimetres (4.2 in) TL. This species can also be found in the aquarium trade.

Female Neolamprologus mondabu can dig pits in the bottom substrate to facilitate feeding of their offspring. Such maternal food provisioning is unusual and is not known among other African substrate-brooding cichlids, but similar behaviour has been observed in Central American cichlids.
