= Neolamprologus schreyeni =

Conservation status
- Vulnerable (IUCN 3.1)

Scientific classification
- Kingdom: Animalia
- Phylum: Chordata
- Class: Actinopterygii
- Order: Cichliformes
- Family: Cichlidae
- Genus: Neolamprologus
- Species: N. schreyeni

Binomial name
- Neolamprologus schreyeni (Poll, 1974)

Synonyms
- Lamprologus schreyeni Poll, 1974

Species of fish

Neolamprologus schreyeni is a species of cichlid endemic to Lake Tanganyika where it is only known from along the Burundi coast, inhabiting crevices. This species reaches a length of 5 centimetres (2.0 in) TL. The specific name honours Andre Schreyen, the nephew of and collaborator with the fish trader Pierre Brichard (1921-1990), who was the collector of the type.
