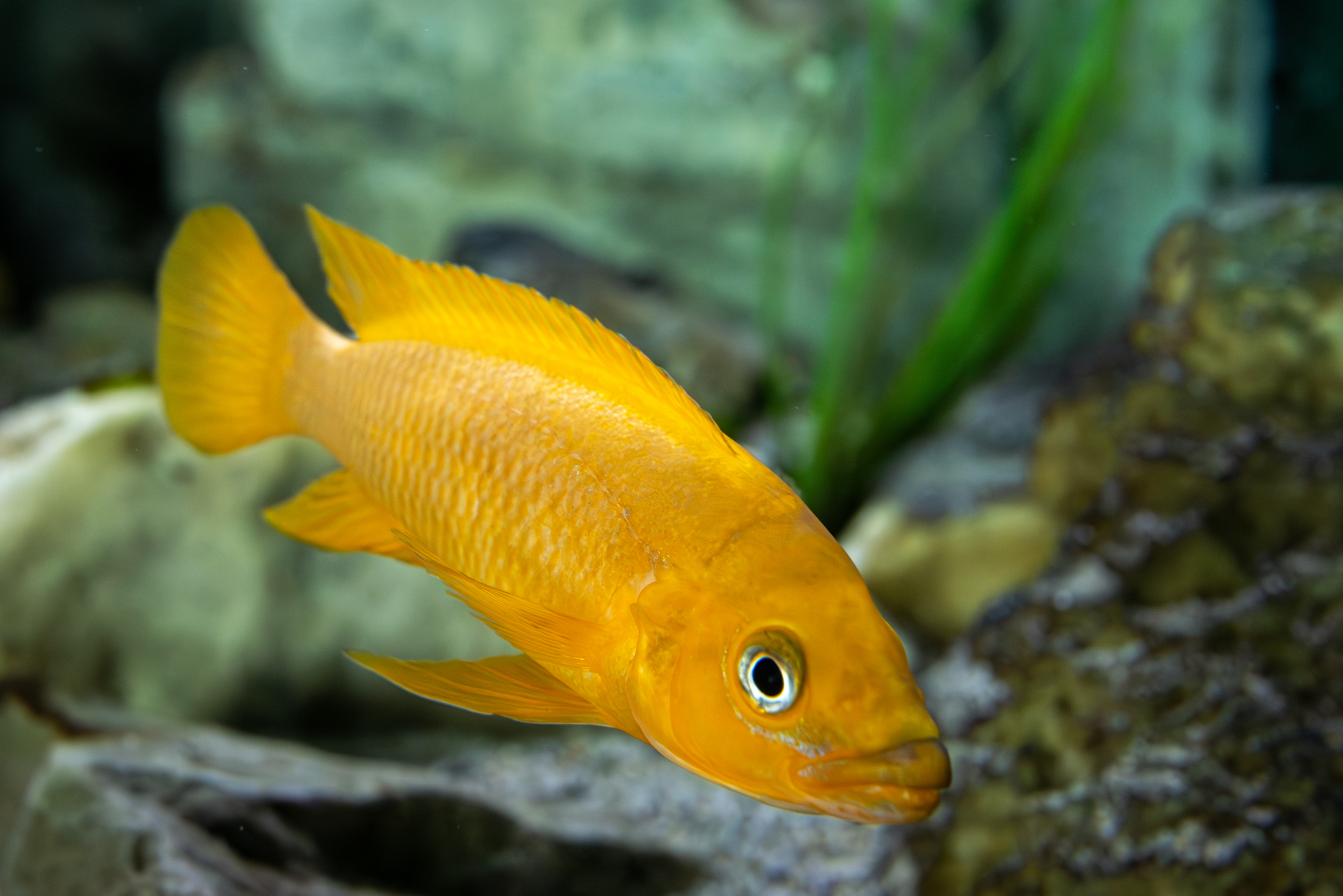

Conservation status
- Least Concern (IUCN 3.1)

Scientific classification
- Kingdom: Animalia
- Phylum: Chordata
- Class: Actinopterygii
- Order: Cichliformes
- Family: Cichlidae
- Genus: Neolamprologus
- Species: N. leleupi

Binomial name
- Neolamprologus leleupi (Poll, 1956)

Synonyms
- Lamprologus leleupi Poll, 1956

= Neolamprologus leleupi =

Species of fish

Neolamprologus leleupi (lemon cichlid) is a species of cichlid endemic to Lake Tanganyika where it occurs throughout the lake. It is a recess-dweller, inhabiting cracks and crevices. It feeds on invertebrates living in the rich biocover of the substrate. This species reaches a length of 10 centimetres (3.9 in) TL. The color of this fish ranges from bright yellow to deep brown. Both color variations exist at each location where this species is found. This relatively small cichlid is a substrate spawner (cave spawner). It is easily confused with the very similar N. longior (Staeck, 1980) a fish also endemic to Lake Tanganyika.

== Etymology ==
The specific name honours the Belgian entomologist Narcisse Leleup (1912-2001), who collected the type.

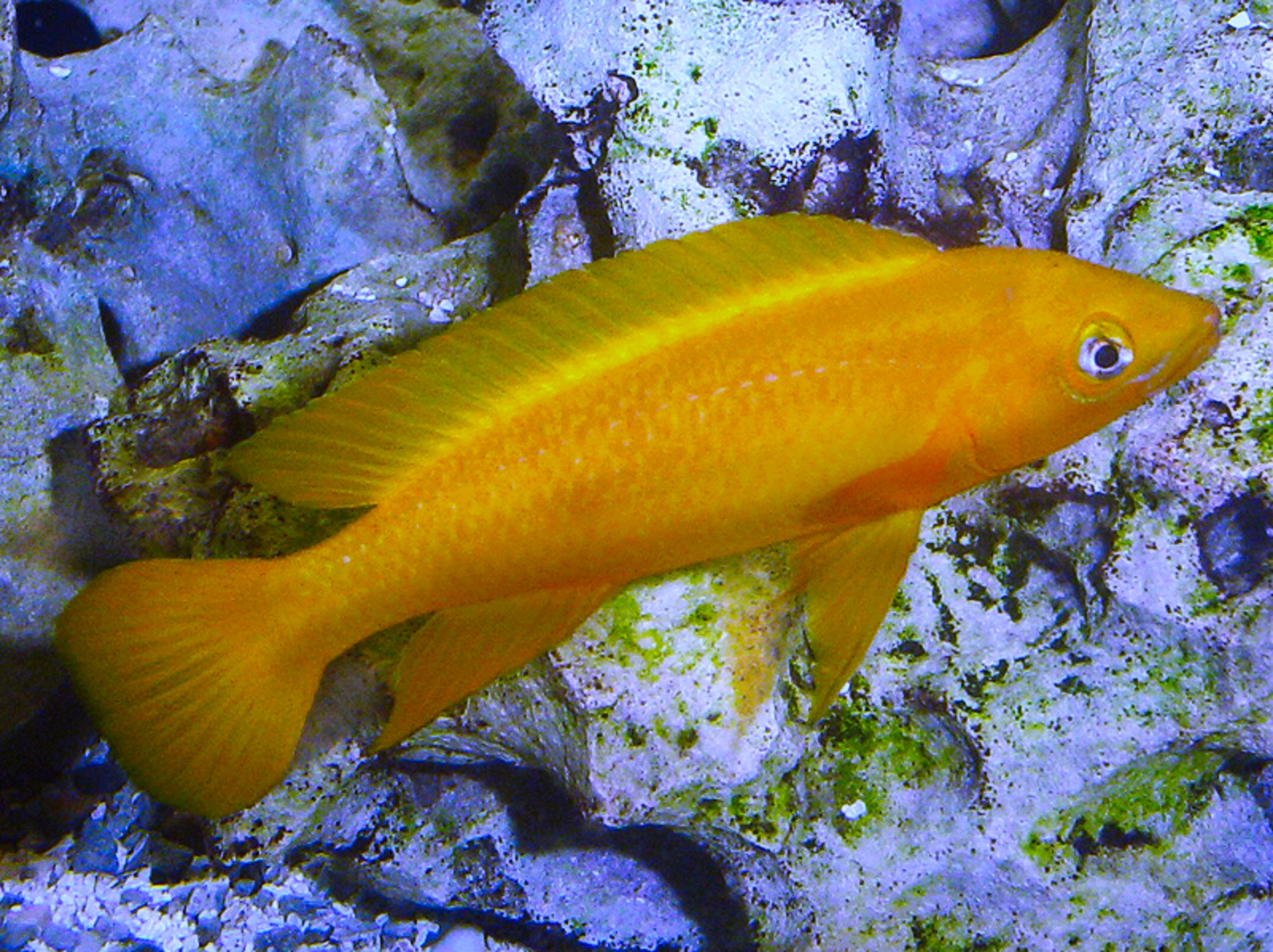
Large Neolamprologus leleupi in an aquarium

== See also ==
- List of freshwater aquarium fish species
