= Neolamprologus crassus =

Conservation status
- Least Concern (IUCN 3.1)

Scientific classification
- Kingdom: Animalia
- Phylum: Chordata
- Class: Actinopterygii
- Order: Cichliformes
- Family: Cichlidae
- Genus: Neolamprologus
- Species: N. crassus

Binomial name
- Neolamprologus crassus (Brichard, 1989)

Synonyms
- Lamprologus crassus Brichard, 1989

Species of fish

Neolamprologus crassus is a species of cichlid endemic to Lake Tanganyika where it can be found in the southwestern part of the lake, in the waters of the Democratic Republic of the Congo. This species can reach a length of 7 centimetres (2.8 in) TL. The type location is the Bay of Luhanga, Democratic Republic of Congo, western coast of Lake Tanganyika. It can also be found in the aquarium trade. Some authorities regard this taxon as a synonym of Neolamprologus pulcher.
