= Neolamprologus petricola =

Conservation status
- Least Concern (IUCN 3.1)

Scientific classification
- Kingdom: Animalia
- Phylum: Chordata
- Class: Actinopterygii
- Order: Cichliformes
- Family: Cichlidae
- Genus: Neolamprologus
- Species: N. petricola

Binomial name
- Neolamprologus petricola (Poll, 1949)

Synonyms
- Lamprologus petricola Poll, 1949

Species of fish

Neolamprologus petricola is a species of cichlid endemic to Lake Tanganyika where it is only known from the shores of the Democratic Republic of the Congo. This species reaches a length of 14 centimetres (5.5 in) TL. It can also be found in the aquarium trade.
