= Neolamprologus christyi =

Conservation status
- Least Concern (IUCN 3.1)

Scientific classification
- Kingdom: Animalia
- Phylum: Chordata
- Class: Actinopterygii
- Order: Cichliformes
- Family: Cichlidae
- Genus: Neolamprologus
- Species: N. christyi

Binomial name
- Neolamprologus christyi (Trewavas & Poll, 1952)

Synonyms
- Lamprologus christyi Trewavas & Poll, 1952

Species of fish

Neolamprologus christyi is a species of cichlid endemic to Lake Tanganyika. This species can reach a length of 13.7 centimetres (5.4 in) TL. It can also be found in the aquarium trade.

== Etymology ==
This cichlid's specific name honours the British naturalist and explorer Cuthbert Christy (1863-1932) who worked for the Belgian Government and who collected the type in either 1926 or 1927.
