= Neolamprologus falcicula =

Conservation status
- Least Concern (IUCN 3.1)

Scientific classification
- Kingdom: Animalia
- Phylum: Chordata
- Class: Actinopterygii
- Division: Teleostei
- Order: Cichliformes
- Family: Cichlidae
- Genus: Neolamprologus
- Species: N. falcicula

Binomial name
- Neolamprologus falcicula (Brichard, 1989)

Synonyms
- Lamprologus falcicula Brichard, 1989; Neolamprologus chitamwebwai Verburg & Bills, 2007

Species of fish

Neolamprologus falcicula is a species of cichlid endemic to Lake Tanganyika where it is only known from the waters off Burundi. The type locality is the Magara coast of Burundi, at a depth of ten meters. This species can reach a length of 8.1 centimetres (3.2 in) TL. It can also be found in the aquarium trade.
