= Alestopetersius brichardi =

Conservation status
- Least Concern (IUCN 3.1)

Scientific classification
- Kingdom: Animalia
- Phylum: Chordata
- Class: Actinopterygii
- Order: Characiformes
- Family: Alestidae
- Genus: Alestopetersius
- Species: A. brichardi

Binomial name
- Alestopetersius brichardi Poll, 1967

Synonyms
- Phenacogrammus brichardi (Poll, 1967)

Species of fish

Alestopetersius brichardi is a species of freshwater ray-finned fish belonging to the family Alestidae, the African tetras. It is found in the Malebo Pool, the middle Congo River, the Ruki River drainage and the Lomami River in the Democratic Republic of the Congo.

== Description ==
Alestopetersius brichardi reaches a standard length of 7.9 cm (3.1 in).

== Etymology ==
The species epithet is named in honor of aquarium-fish exporter Pierre Brichard (1921–1990).
