= Neolamprologus niger =

Conservation status
- Least Concern (IUCN 3.1)

Scientific classification
- Kingdom: Animalia
- Phylum: Chordata
- Class: Actinopterygii
- Order: Cichliformes
- Family: Cichlidae
- Genus: Neolamprologus
- Species: N. niger

Binomial name
- Neolamprologus niger (Poll, 1956)

Synonyms
- Lamprologus niger Poll, 1956

Species of fish

Neolamprologus niger is a species of cichlid endemic to Lake Tanganyika where it is only found along the northern shores. It is a crevice-dweller and feeds on molluscs. This species reaches a length of 9 centimetres (3.5 in) TL. It can also be found in the aquarium trade.
