= Neolamprologus savoryi =

Conservation status
- Least Concern (IUCN 3.1)

Scientific classification
- Kingdom: Animalia
- Phylum: Chordata
- Class: Actinopterygii
- Order: Cichliformes
- Family: Cichlidae
- Genus: Neolamprologus
- Species: N. savoryi

Binomial name
- Neolamprologus savoryi (Poll, 1949)

Synonyms
- Lamprologus savoryi Poll, 1949

Species of fish

Neolamprologus savoryi is a species of cichlid endemic to Lake Tanganyika. This species reaches a length of 8 centimetres (3.1 in) TL. It can also be found in the aquarium trade. The specific name of this cichlid honours Bryan Wyman Savory (1904-1988) who was the District Commissioner of Kigoma in the Tanganyika Territory during the Belgian Hydrobiological Mission to Lake Tanganyika of 1946–1947, this expedition collected the type.
