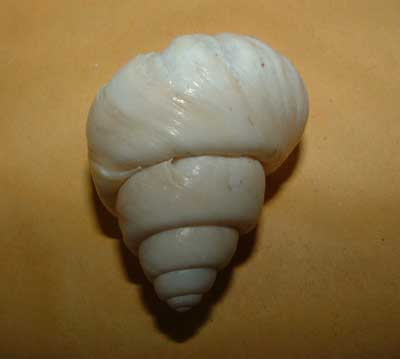
- Shell of Neothauma tanganyicense

Conservation status
- Least Concern (IUCN 3.1)

Scientific classification
- Kingdom: Animalia
- Phylum: Mollusca
- Class: Gastropoda
- Subclass: Caenogastropoda
- Order: Architaenioglossa
- Family: Viviparidae
- Genus: Neothauma
- Species: N. tanganyicense

Binomial name
- Neothauma tanganyicense E. A. Smith, 1880

= Neothauma tanganyicense =

Species of gastropod

Neothauma tanganyicense is a species of freshwater snail with a gill and an operculum, an aquatic gastropod mollusc in the subfamily Bellamyinae of the family Viviparidae.

== Distribution ==
This freshwater snail is only found in Lake Tanganyika, where it is the largest gastropod, and occurs in all four of the bordering countries — Burundi, the Democratic Republic of the Congo, Tanzania, and Zambia — although fossil shells have been discovered at Lake Edward and in the Lake Albert basin.

The type locality is the East shore of Lake Tanganyika, at Ujiji.

== Description ==
The width of the shell is 46 mm (1.8 in). The height of the shell is 60 mm (2.4 in).

== Ecology ==
This species lives in depths of up to 65 m (213 ft). There is conflicting information relating to its feeding behavior, with one study referring to it as a detritus-feeder, another saying that it actively preys on endobenthic organisms, and finally that it feeds on particulate organic filtered while the snail is buried.

The shells of dead Neothauma tanganyicense often form carpets over large areas, and are used by a number of other animals, such as cichlid fish (shell dwellers), and freshwater crabs of the genus Platythelphusa. Juvenile snails live in the sediment in order to avoid predators.
