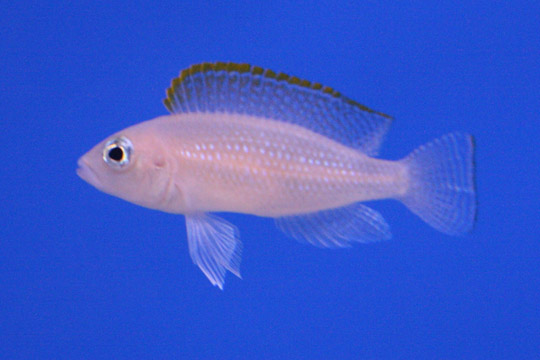

Conservation status
- Least Concern (IUCN 3.1)

Scientific classification
- Kingdom: Animalia
- Phylum: Chordata
- Class: Actinopterygii
- Order: Cichliformes
- Family: Cichlidae
- Genus: Neolamprologus
- Species: N. caudopunctatus

Binomial name
- Neolamprologus caudopunctatus (Poll, 1978)

Synonyms
- Lamprologus caudopunctatus Poll, 1978

= Neolamprologus caudopunctatus =

Species of fish

Neolamprologus caudopunctatus is a species of cichlid endemic to Lake Tanganyika, where it occurs along the Zambian shores.

It has a silvery-beige colored body, accented only by a distinctive, goldish-orange dorsal fin and blue eyes. Its tail fin and flanks have pearly spots that are visible if the light hits them at the correct angle. These spots that spatter the tails of both males and females have earned it the name caudopunctatus, meaning "spotted tail."

Despite being a monomorphic species, there are a few subtle traits that can help distinguish males from females. Males usually attain a length of 9 centimetres (3.5 in), while females are significantly smaller, at 6.5 centimetres (2.6 in). Males also tend to show a slightly more intense coloration.
