= Neolamprologus toae =

Conservation status
- Least Concern (IUCN 3.1)

Scientific classification
- Kingdom: Animalia
- Phylum: Chordata
- Class: Actinopterygii
- Order: Cichliformes
- Family: Cichlidae
- Genus: Neolamprologus
- Species: N. toae

Binomial name
- Neolamprologus toae (Poll, 1949)

Synonyms
- Lamprologus toae Poll, 1949; Paleolamprologus toae (Poll, 1949)

Species of fish

Neolamprologus toae is a species of cichlid endemic to Lake Tanganyika. This species reaches a length of 12 centimetres (4.7 in) TL. It can also be found in the aquarium trade.
