= Adaptive behavior (ecology) =

Behavior which increases reproductive success

In behavioral ecology, adaptive behavior is any behavior that contributes directly or indirectly to an individual's reproductive success, and is thus subject to the forces of natural selection. Examples include favoring kin in altruistic behaviors, sexual selection of the most fit mate, and defending a territory or harem from rivals.

Conversely, non-adaptive behavior is any behavior that is counterproductive to an individual's survival or reproductive success. Examples might include altruistic behaviors which do not favor kin, adoption of unrelated young, and being a subordinate in a dominance hierarchy.

Adaptations are commonly defined as evolved solutions to recurrent environmental problems of survival and reproduction. Individual differences commonly arise through both heritable and non-heritable adaptive behavior. Both have been proven to be influential in the evolution of species' adaptive behaviors, although non-heritable adaptation remains a controversial subject.

== Non-heritable ==
Populations change through the process of evolution. Each individual in a population has a unique role in their particular environment. This role, commonly known as an ecological niche, is simply how an organism lives in an environment in relation to others. Over successive generations, the organism must adapt to their surrounding conditions in order to develop their niche. An organism's niche will evolve as changes in the external environment occur. The most successful species in nature are those that are able to use adaptive behaviors to build on prior knowledge, thereby increasing their overall knowledge bank. In turn, this will improve their overall survival and reproductive success.

=== Learning ===
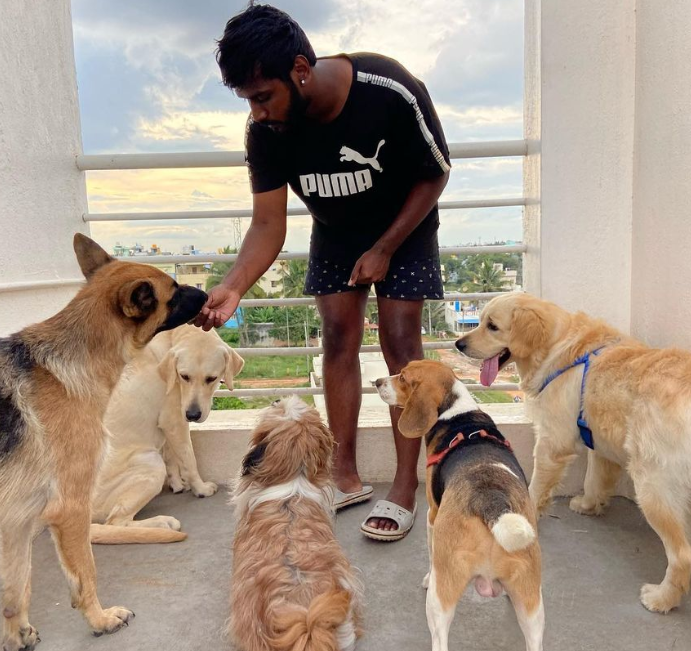
Dogs (Canis lupus familiaris) can learn through human training.

Many species have the ability to adapt through learning. Organisms will often learn through various psychological and cognitive processes, such as operant and classical conditioning and discrimination memory. This learning process allows organisms to modify their behavior to survive in unpredictable environments. Organisms begin as naive individuals and learning allows them to obtain the knowledge they need to adapt and survive. A learned adaptive behavior must have a psychological, as well as a biological, component; without the integration of these two disciplines, behavioral adaptation cannot occur.

==== Kin selection ====
Kin selection (commonly referred to as altruism) is an example of an adaptive behavior that directly influences the genetic composition of a population. It involves evolutionary strategies that favor the persistence of an organism's relatives, often at the cost of the organism's own survival and reproduction. This will result in population gene frequency variation over successive generations, based on the interactions between related individuals. The probability of altruism increases when the cost is low for the donor, or when there is a high level of gain for the beneficiary. In addition, individuals often display altruistic behaviors when the relative is genetically similar to them. This means offspring or siblings are more likely to benefit from altruism than someone more distantly related, such as a cousin, aunt, or uncle. Kin selection has played a large role in the evolution of social and adaptive behaviors in chimpanzees. Closely related chimpanzees will form a kin group that cooperates to protect a territory, thereby increasing their access to females and resources. By working together with close relatives, they can ensure that their genes will persist in the next generation, even if circumstances make them unable to reproduce themselves. This behavioral adaptation coincides with the chimpanzee's ability to distinguish kin from non-kin (referred to as visual kin selection) allowing chimps to formulate large, complex societies, where they use altruistic methods to ensure their genes persist in future generations. A wide variety of species, including lions, honeybees, and other insects have displayed kin selection as an adaptive behavior.

==== Territorial defense ====
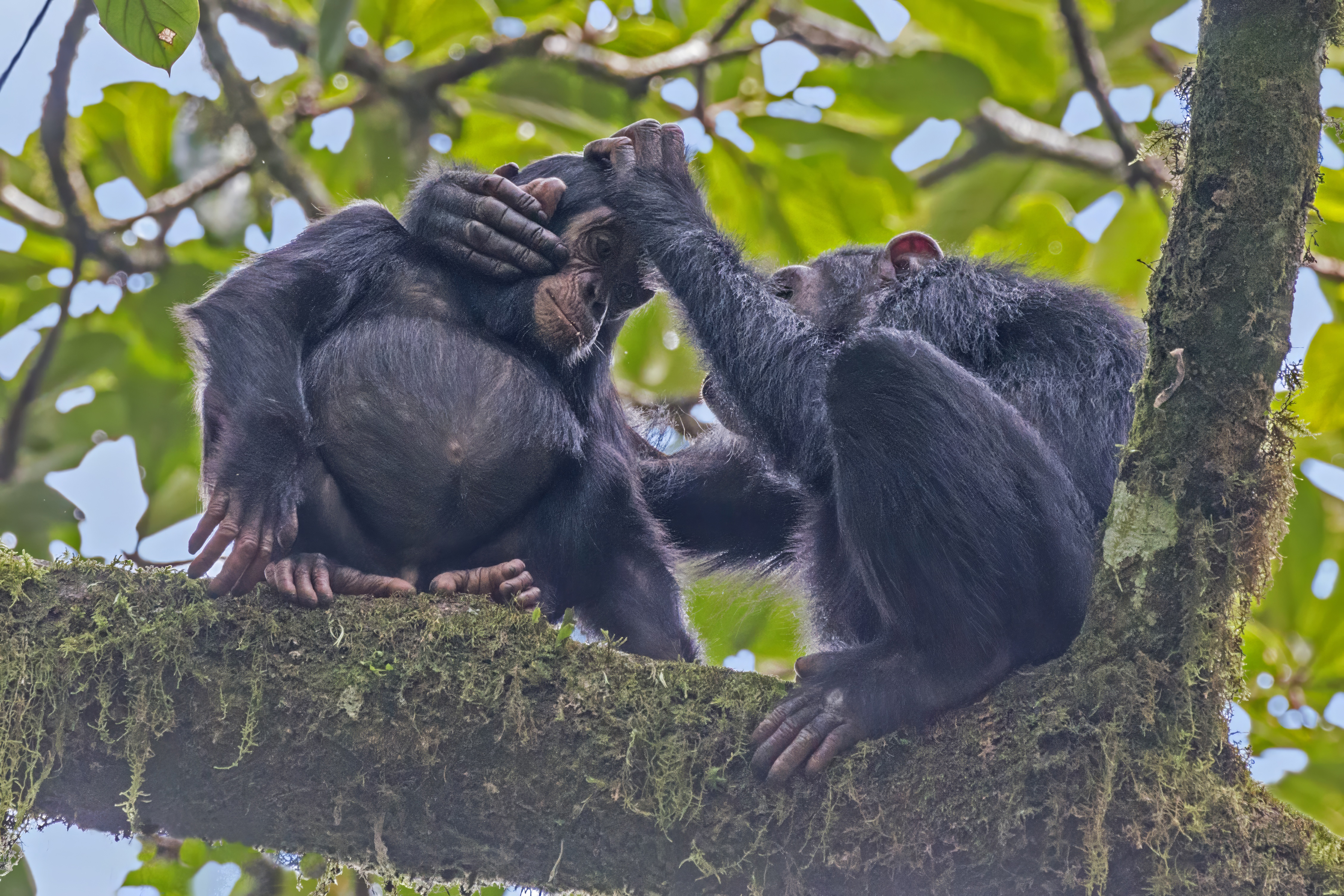
Chimpanzees (Pan troglodytes) exhibit both kin selection and territorial defense.

As mentioned above, chimpanzees work together with closely related kin to protect their territory. Defending territory from rivals (known as territoriality) is a learnt adaptive behavior performed by several ecological species. The advantage of being territorial varies depending on the species of interest, but the underlying principle is always to increase overall fitness. Many species will display territoriality in order to acquire food, compete for mates, or have the safest lair. Bird song is an example of learned territorial defense. Studies show that birds with high-quality songs will use them as a stimulus to deter predators from their territorial range. Higher quality songs have been proven to act as the best defense mechanism in a variety of bird species, such as the red-winged blackbird (Agelaius phoeniceus). Therefore, correct learning of the birdsong early in life is necessary for territory defense in birds. European beavers (Castor fiber) are another species that use territory defense. They are very protective of their territory because they spend a great deal of time and energy familiarizing themselves with the location and building a habitat. Beavers have developed the technique of scent-marking as a way to intimidate intruders. This scent acts as a "psychological fence", thereby decreasing the possibility of injury or death by predation.

=== Controversy ===
There is debate on whether or not there exists a biological component associated with the learning process in ecological adaptive behavior. Many researchers suggest that the biological and psychological disciplines are integrated, while others believe that the non-heritable component is strictly psychological. They argue that non-heritable traits cannot evolve over successive generations.

== Heritable ==
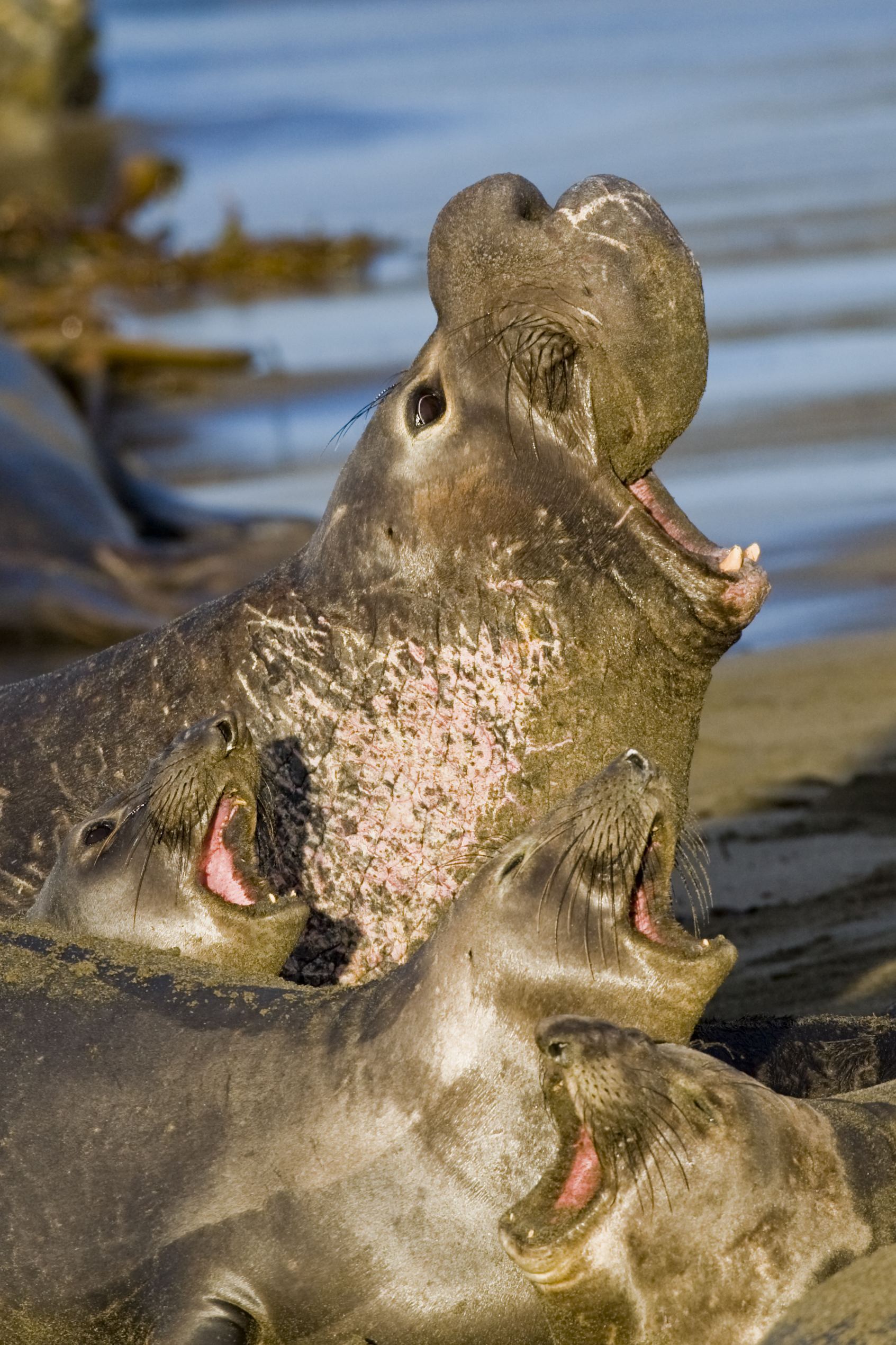
Male northern elephant seals will fight to defend their harems from rival males, note the pink scarring on the neck of the dominant male.

Organisms can also express heritable adaptive behaviors. These behaviors are encoded in their genes and inherited from their parents. This gives the organisms the ability to respond to situations with their innate response mechanisms. Using these mechanisms, they can respond appropriately to their internal and external environment without having to learn.

=== Natural selection ===
Heritable adaptive behavior evolves through natural selection. In this case, some genes better equip individuals to respond to environmental or physiological cues, thereby increasing reproductive success and causing these genes to persist in future generations. Non-adaptive behaviors cause a decrease in reproductive success so the genes are lost from future generations. These adaptive and non-adaptive characteristics arise through random mutation, recombination, and/or genetic drift. Essentially, natural selection is a mechanism that contributes to directional gene selection in individuals that reproduce. Traits that cause greater reproductive success of an organism are favored, whereas those that reduce reproductive success are selected against.

In contrast to learning, natural selection is solely a biological concept. It is the biological and genetic component that allows an adaptive behavior to be inherited with no connection to the environment. This form of adaptive behavior is most commonly considered in ecological studies, and therefore natural selection is often used to explain ecological adaptive behavior in organisms.

==== Sexual selection ====
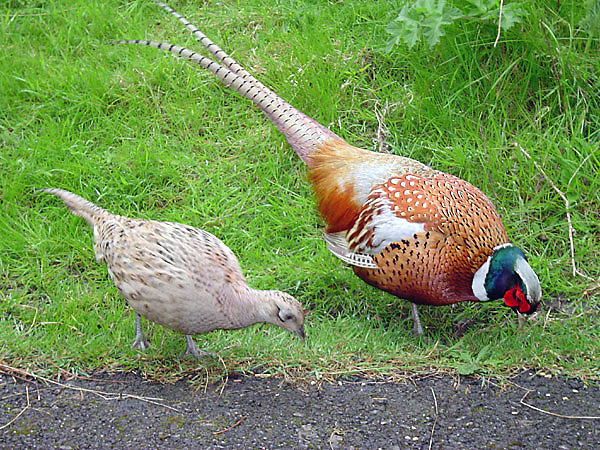
Common pheasants (Phasianus colchicus) exhibit significant sexual dimorphism. The smaller pale bird to the left is female, while the larger more colorful bird on the right is male.

While kin selection is non-heritable and a direct result of the environment, sexual selection is a heritable adaptive behavior, and can therefore be acted upon by natural selection. Sexual selection refers specifically to competition for mates.

Many traits or features that are characteristic of a certain species can be explained by sexual selection as an adaptive behavior; this is because competition for mates results in specific traits being inherited. Only the species that are able to successfully compete and obtain a mate will reproduce and pass their genes on to the next generation. Therefore, species-specific genetic traits must be inherited, allowing individuals to be successful in their designated environments. There are many environmental examples of sexual selection as an adaptive behavior; one popular example is sexual dimorphism. Sexual dimorphism is a morphological, phenotypic difference between males and females of the same species. A common example of sexual dimorphism is difference in body size. Sexual dimorphism can specifically be seen in the fish species, Lamprologus callipterus. Male L. calliptreus are substantially larger (sometimes up to 60 times) than their female counterparts. The male's increased size is advantageous because the larger individuals are able to compete for females, and subsequently defend their offspring, which grow inside empty snail shells until birth. Basically, the larger the male fish, the greater the adaptive benefit. The advantage of being larger and more powerful is demonstrated in the male's ability to compete and protect. In contrast to the males, the female fish must remain small in order to lay eggs inside the snail shells. It is evident that size plays a significant role in the reproductive success of this particular fish species. Large size is a common adaptive behavioral trait that is inherited through sexual selection and reproduction, as demonstrated in Lamprologus callipterus and other sexually dimorphic species.

== Importance ==
It has been proven that adaptive behavior is crucial in the process of natural selection, and thus is important in the evolutionary process. Species that possess positive adaptive behaviors will inherently acquire evolutionary advantages. For example, adaptive behavior is a mechanism of population stabilization. In natural communities, organisms are able to interact with each other creating complex food webs and predator-prey dynamics. Adaptive behavior helps modulate the dynamics of feeding relationships by having a direct effect on their feeding traits and strategies. These adaptive behaviors allow for resilience and resistance in the face of disturbances and a changing environment. In ecology, the coexistence of organisms in natural ecosystems and the stability of populations are central topics. Currently, we live in a world experiencing great changes at a fast rate, mostly due to anthropogenic impacts on organisms and the environment. By studying adaptive behavior one can understand ecosystem complexity – how it emerges, how it evolves, and how it can be maintained.

== Measurement ==
An organism's behavioral strategies and ability to adapt will determine how they respond under different environmental conditions. Fitness is a common measure of adaptive success, and can be defined as the number of descendants left over after a group exhibits a particular behavioral strategy. Successful strategies will result in increased survival and reproduction, which in turn can be characterized as a profitable behavioral adaptation.
