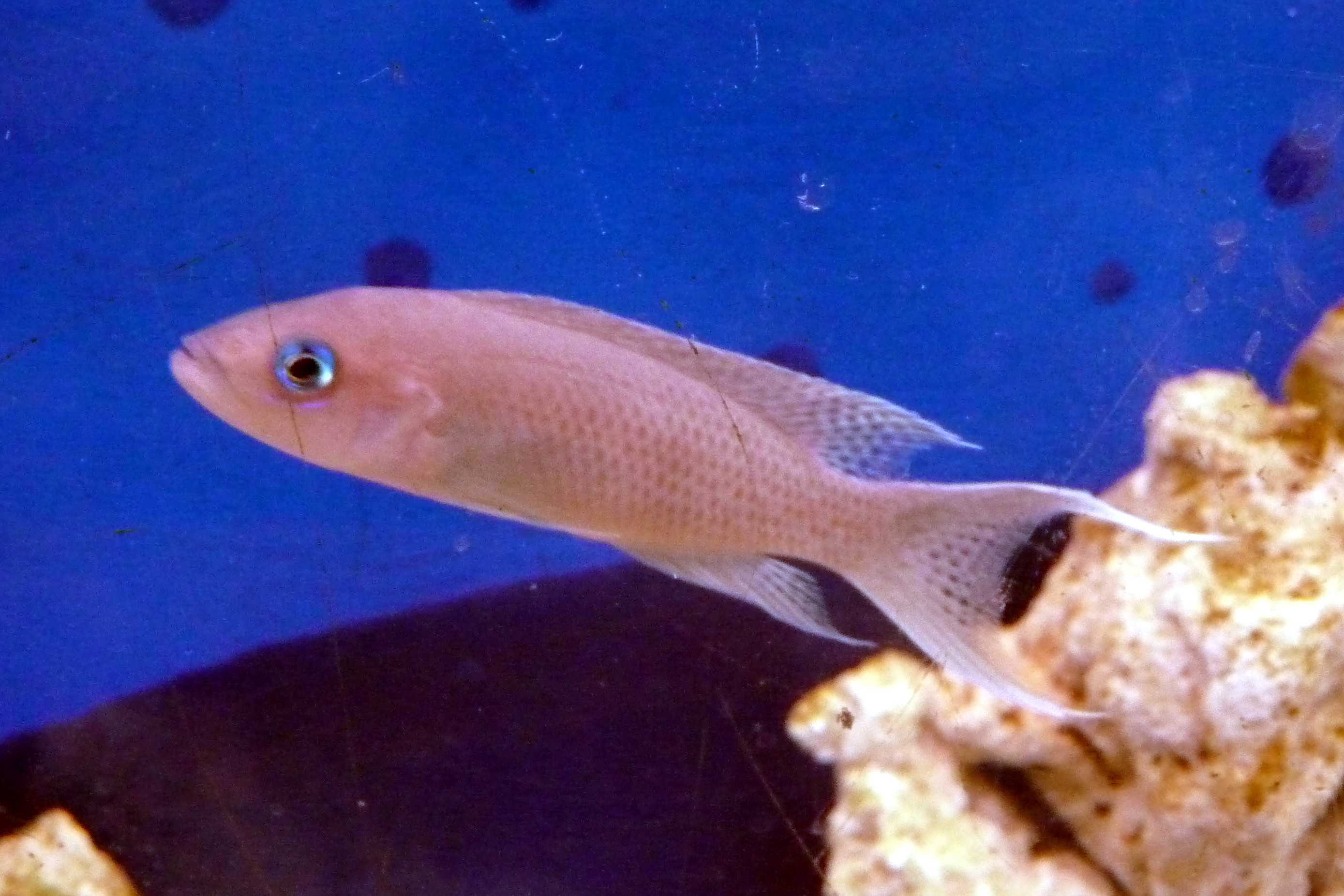

Conservation status
- Least Concern (IUCN 3.1)

Scientific classification
- Kingdom: Animalia
- Phylum: Chordata
- Class: Actinopterygii
- Division: Teleostei
- Order: Cichliformes
- Family: Cichlidae
- Genus: Neolamprologus
- Species: N. gracilis

Binomial name
- Neolamprologus gracilis (Brichard, 1989)

Synonyms
- Lamprologus gracilis Brichard, 1989

= Neolamprologus gracilis =

Species of fish

Neolamprologus gracilis is a species of cichlid endemic to Lake Tanganyika where it is known from Cape Kapampa on the western coast and on the eastern coast from the area of coast below the Mahale Mountains. The type locality is Cape Kapampa, Lake Tanganyika. This species can reach a length of 9 centimetres (3.5 in) TL.
