= Neolamprologus leloupi =

Conservation status
- Least Concern (IUCN 3.1)

Scientific classification
- Kingdom: Animalia
- Phylum: Chordata
- Class: Actinopterygii
- Order: Cichliformes
- Family: Cichlidae
- Genus: Neolamprologus
- Species: N. leloupi

Binomial name
- Neolamprologus leloupi (Poll, 1948)

Synonyms
- Lamprologus leloupi Poll, 1948

Species of fish

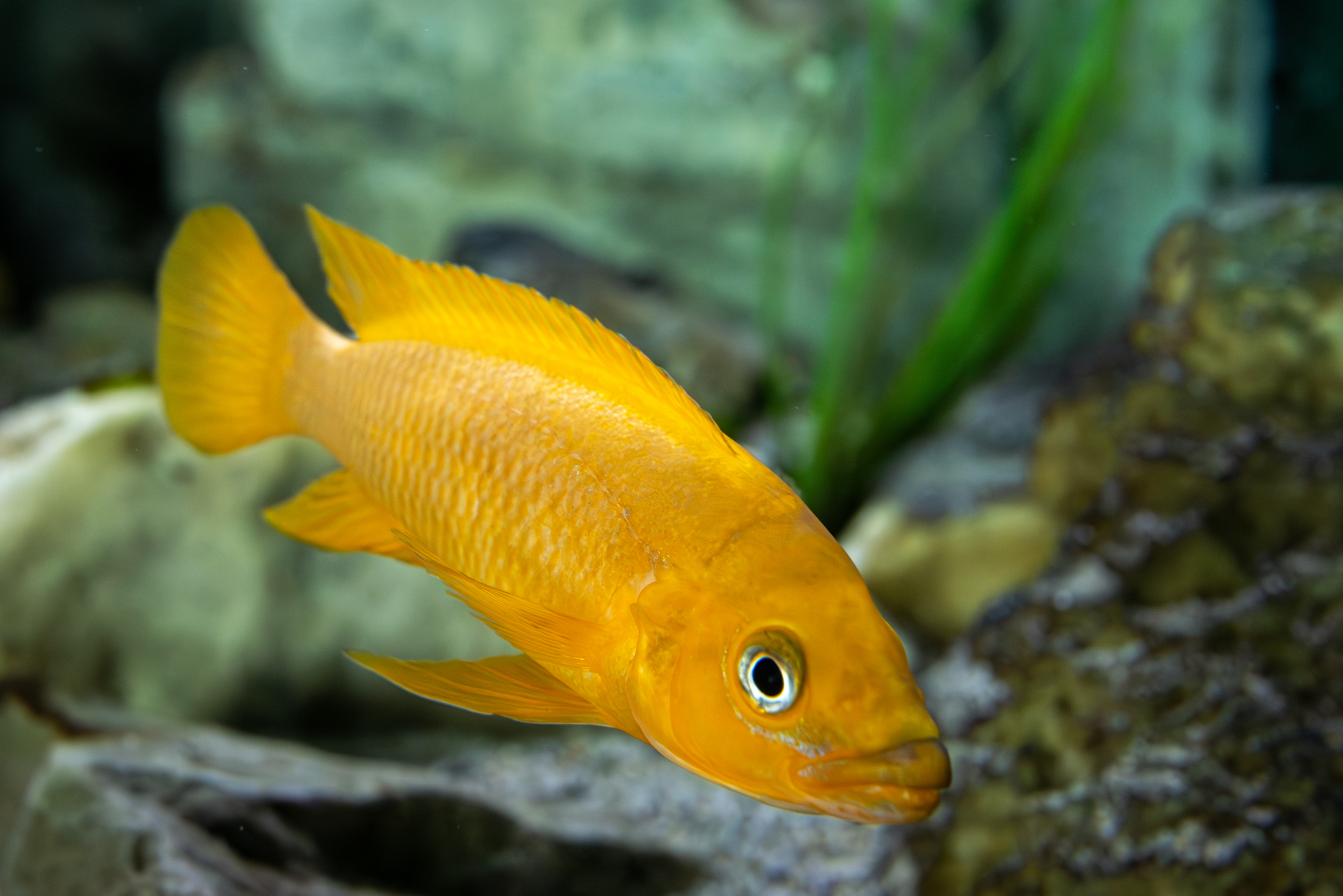

Neolamprologus leloupi is a species of cichlid endemic to Lake Tanganyika. This species reaches a length of 6.1 centimetres (2.4 in) TL. It can also be found in the aquarium trade. The specific name honours the malacologist Eugène Leloup (1902-1981), chief of the Belgian Hydrobiological Mission to Lake Tanganyika in 1946–1947, the type being collected during this expedition.
