= Enteromius brichardi =

Conservation status
- Least Concern (IUCN 3.1)

Scientific classification
- Kingdom: Animalia
- Phylum: Chordata
- Class: Actinopterygii
- Order: Cypriniformes
- Family: Cyprinidae
- Subfamily: Smiliogastrinae
- Genus: Enteromius
- Species: E. brichardi

Binomial name
- Enteromius brichardi (Poll & J. G. Lambert, 1959)

Synonyms
- Barbus brichardi Poll & Lambert, 1959

Species of fish

Enteromius brichardi is a species of cyprinid fish native to the Republic of the Congo and Gabon. This species can reach a length of 8 centimetres (3.1 in) TL.

== Etymology ==
The fish is named in honor of African aquarium-fish exporter Pierre Brichard (1921-1990), who collected the type specimen.
