= Neolamprologus wauthioni =

Conservation status
- Least Concern (IUCN 3.1)

Scientific classification
- Kingdom: Animalia
- Phylum: Chordata
- Class: Actinopterygii
- Order: Cichliformes
- Family: Cichlidae
- Genus: Neolamprologus
- Species: N. wauthioni

Binomial name
- Neolamprologus wauthioni (Poll, 1949)

Synonyms
- Lamprologus wauthioni Poll, 1949

Species of fish

Neolamprologus wauthioni is a species of cichlid endemic to Lake Tanganyika where it inhabits snail shells. This species reaches a length of 5.5 centimetres (2.2 in) TL. The specific name of this cichlid honours René Wauthion, a Provincial Commissioner in the Belgian Congo during the Belgian Hydrobiological Mission to Lake Tanganyika of 1946–1947, this expedition collected the type.
