= Neolamprologus obscurus =

Conservation status
- Least Concern (IUCN 3.1)

Scientific classification
- Kingdom: Animalia
- Phylum: Chordata
- Class: Actinopterygii
- Order: Cichliformes
- Family: Cichlidae
- Genus: Neolamprologus
- Species: N. obscurus

Binomial name
- Neolamprologus obscurus (Poll, 1978)

Synonyms
- Lamprologus obscurus Poll, 1978

Species of fish

Neolamprologus obscurus is a species of cichlid endemic to Lake Tanganyika where it is only known from southern end of the lake where it inhabits crevices. This species reaches a length of 8.2 centimetres (3.2 in) TL. It can also be found in the aquarium trade.
