= Neolamprologus splendens =

Conservation status
- Least Concern (IUCN 3.1)

Scientific classification
- Kingdom: Animalia
- Phylum: Chordata
- Class: Actinopterygii
- Order: Cichliformes
- Family: Cichlidae
- Genus: Neolamprologus
- Species: N. splendens

Binomial name
- Neolamprologus splendens (Brichard, 1989)

Synonyms
- Lamprologus splendens Brichard, 1989

Species of fish

Neolamprologus splendens is a species of cichlid endemic to Lake Tanganyika where it is only known to occur around Cape Zongwe in the Democratic Republic of the Congo. The type locality is Near Cape Zongwe, Lake Tanganyika. This species can reach a length of 8 centimetres (3.1 in) TL.
