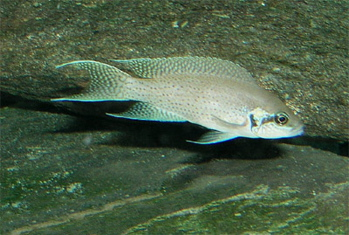
- Neolamprologus brichardi from Lake Tanganyika.

Scientific classification
- Kingdom: Animalia
- Phylum: Chordata
- Class: Actinopterygii
- Division: Teleostei
- Order: Cichliformes
- Family: Cichlidae
- Tribe: Lamprologini
- Genus: Neolamprologus; Colombé & Allgayer, 1985

Type species
- Lamprologus tetracanthus Boulenger, 1899

= Neolamprologus =

Genus of fishes

Neolamprologus is a genus of cichlids endemic to eastern Africa with all species occurring in Lake Tanganyika. It is the largest genus of cichlids in Lake Tanganyika and also the largest genus in the tribe Lamprologini, which includes Altolamprologus, Chalinochromis, Julidochromis, Lamprologus, Lepidiolamprologus, Telmatochromis and Variabilichromis. The latter is a monotypic genus doubtfully distinct from Neolamprologus.

It is already known for some time that according to mtDNA sequence analysis, this genus is very probably polyphyletic. It is likely that it will be revised eventually; if Variabilichromis is split off, at least some of the more ancient lineages currently placed in Neolamprologus are probably worthy of separation also. However, the morphological similarity and numerous undescribed species do not make analyses easier, and as with many cichlids, recent speciation and abundant hybridization seriously confound molecular studies to the point where single-gene studies or those using only mtDNA or nDNA are essentially worthless for resolving Lamprologini phylogeny.

While lineages are clearly different in their morphology, habits and ecology, gene flow between genera and species is common enough due to extremely low postzygotic isolation. Males of Neolamprologus apparently have always readily and successfully mated with females of other Lamprologini they found ready to spawn: mtDNA lineages similar to other Lamprologini genera are widely encountered in species placed in Neolamprologus. And not only do such hybrids seem to be fertile at least to a limited extent in many cases, new species often appear to originate from such interbreeding.

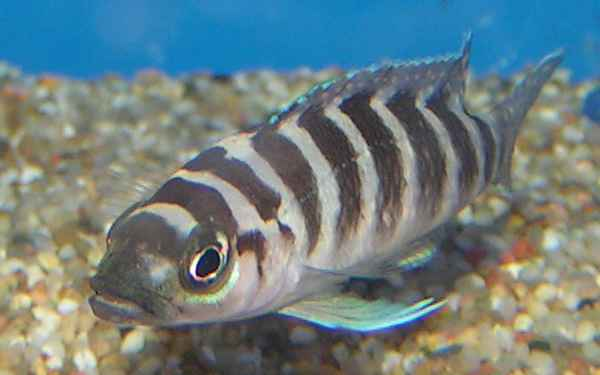
Neolamprologus cylindricus

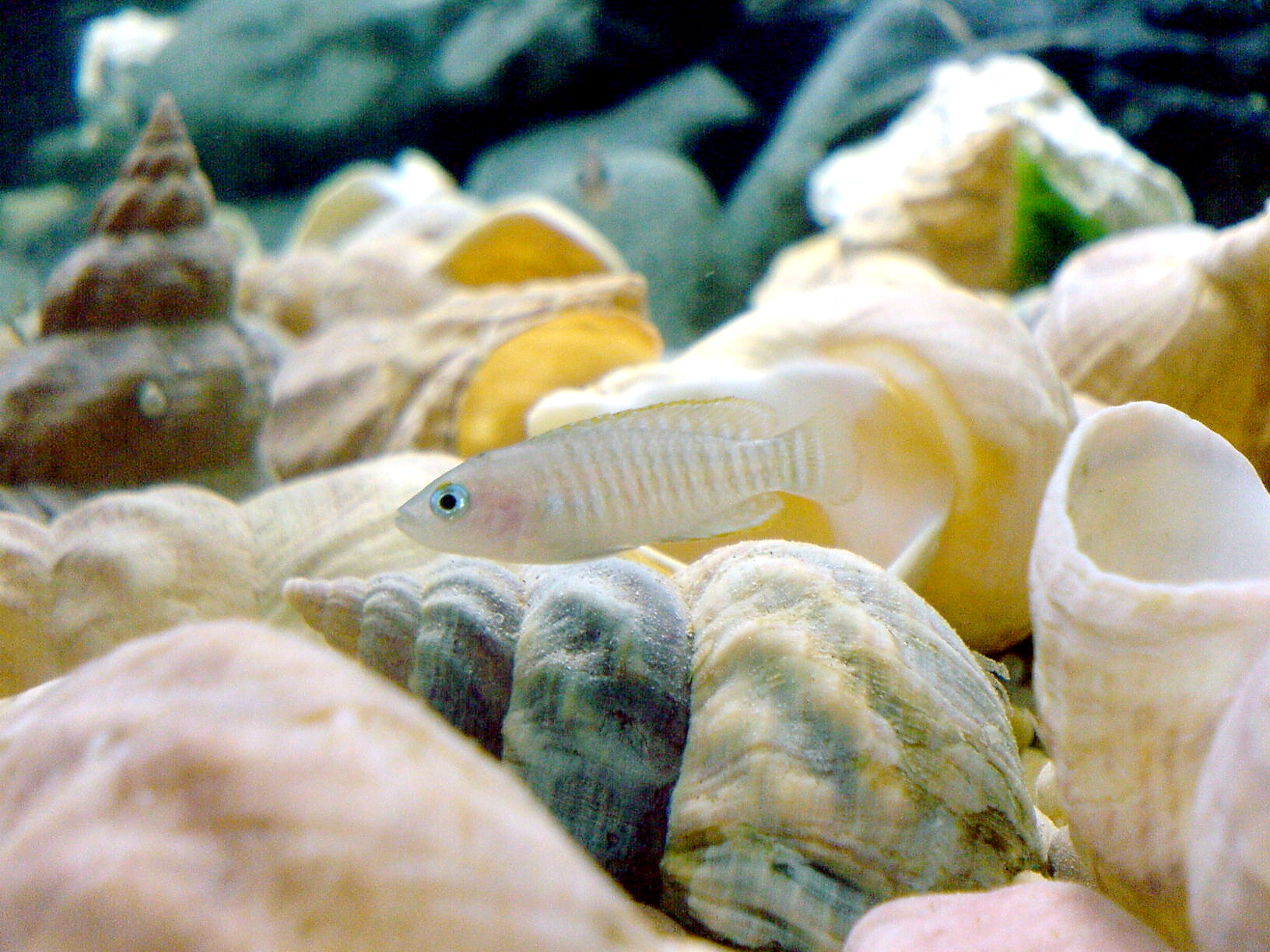
Neolamprologus multifasciatus

== Species ==
There are currently 52 recognized species in this genus:

- Neolamprologus bifasciatus Büscher, 1993
- Neolamprologus brevis Boulenger, 1899
- Neolamprologus brichardi Poll, 1974
- Neolamprologus buescheri Staeck, 1983
- Neolamprologus callipterus (Boulenger, 1906)
- Neolamprologus calliurus (Boulenger, 1906)
- Neolamprologus cancellatus Aibara, T. Takahashi & Nakaya, 2005
- Neolamprologus caudopunctatus Poll, 1978
- Neolamprologus christyi Trewavas & Poll, 1952
- Neolamprologus cunningtoni (Boulenger, 1906)
- Neolamprologus cylindricus Staeck & Seegers, 1986
- Neolamprologus falcicula (Brichard, 1989)
- Neolamprologus finalimus (Nichols & LaMonte, 1931)
- Neolamprologus furcifer Boulenger, 1898
- Neolamprologus gracilis (Brichard, 1989)
- Neolamprologus kungweensis (Poll, 1956)
- Neolamprologus laparogramma (Bills & Ribbink, 1997)
- Neolamprologus leleupi Poll, 1956
- Neolamprologus leloupi Poll, 1948
- Neolamprologus lemairii (Boulenger, 1899)
- Neolamprologus longicaudatus Nakaya & Gashagaza, 1995
- Neolamprologus longior Staeck, 1980
- Neolamprologus marunguensis Büscher, 1989
- Neolamprologus modestus Boulenger, 1898
- Neolamprologus mondabu Boulenger, 1906
- Neolamprologus multifasciatus Boulenger, 1906
- Neolamprologus mustax Poll, 1978
- Neolamprologus niger Poll, 1956
- Neolamprologus nigriventris Büscher, 1992
- Neolamprologus obscurus Poll, 1978
- Neolamprologus ocellatus (Steindachner, 1909)
- Neolamprologus ornatipinnis (Poll, 1949)
- Neolamprologus pectoralis Büscher, 1991
- Neolamprologus petricola Poll, 1949
- Neolamprologus prochilus R. M. Bailey & D. J. Stewart, 1977
- Neolamprologus pulcher Trewavas & Poll, 1952
- Neolamprologus savoryi Poll, 1949
- Neolamprologus schreyeni Poll, 1974
- Neolamprologus sexfasciatus Trewavas & Poll, 1952
- Neolamprologus signatus (Poll, 1952)
- Neolamprologus similis Büscher, 1992
- Neolamprologus speciosus (Büscher, 1991)
- Neolamprologus splendens (Brichard, 1989)
- Neolamprologus stappersi (Pellegrin, 1927)
- Neolamprologus tetracanthus Boulenger, 1899 (Fourspine cichlid)
- Neolamprologus timidus S. O. Kullander, Norén, Mi. Karlsson & Ma. Karlsson, 2014
- Neolamprologus toae Poll, 1949
- Neolamprologus tretocephalus Boulenger, 1899
- Neolamprologus variostigma Büscher, 1995
- Neolamprologus ventralis Büscher, 1995
- Neolamprologus walteri Verburg & I. R. Bills, 2007
- Neolamprologus wauthioni Poll, 1949

Synonyms

- Neolamprologus crassus (Brichard, 1989); valid as N. pulcher
- Neolamprologus helianthus Büscher, 1997; valid as N. splendens
- Neolamprologus olivaceous (Brichard, 1989); valid as N. pulcher
