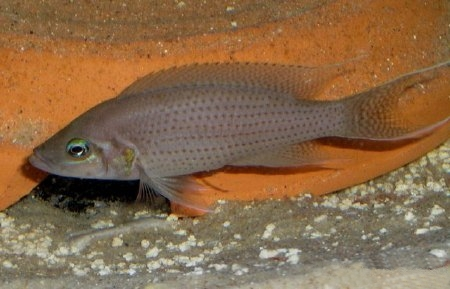

Conservation status
- Data Deficient (IUCN 3.1)

Scientific classification
- Kingdom: Animalia
- Phylum: Chordata
- Class: Actinopterygii
- Order: Cichliformes
- Family: Cichlidae
- Genus: Neolamprologus
- Species: N. olivaceous

Binomial name
- Neolamprologus olivaceous (Brichard, 1989)

Synonyms
- Lamprologus olivaceous Brichard, 1989

= Neolamprologus olivaceous =

Species of fish

Neolamprologus olivaceous is a species of cichlid endemic to Lake Tanganyika where it is only known from Luhanga Bay in the Democratic Republic of the Congo. The type locality is the Bay of Luhanga, Democratic Republic of Congo, on the western coast of Lake Tanganyika. This species can reach a length of 9 centimetres (3.5 in) TL.
