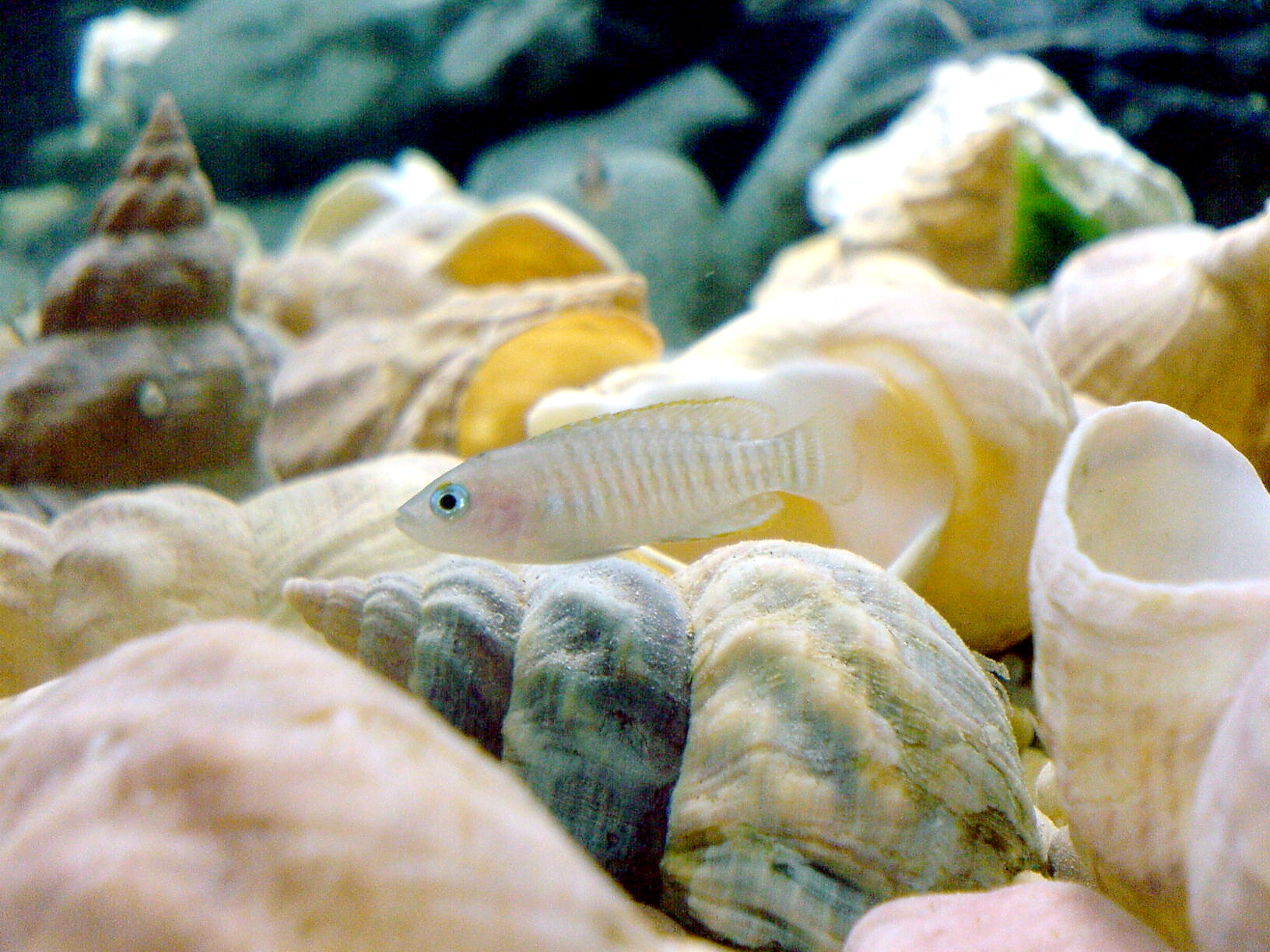
- Neolamprologus multifasciatus male

Conservation status
- Least Concern (IUCN 3.1)

Scientific classification
- Kingdom: Animalia
- Phylum: Chordata
- Class: Actinopterygii
- Division: Teleostei
- Order: Cichliformes
- Family: Cichlidae
- Genus: Neolamprologus
- Species: N. multifasciatus

Binomial name
- Neolamprologus multifasciatus (Boulenger, 1906)

Synonyms
- Lamprologus multifasciatus Boulenger, 1906

= Neolamprologus multifasciatus =

Species of fish

Neolamprologus multifasciatus (also known as Multies, Multi., or Shellies) are one of the small shell-dwelling cichlids endemic to Lake Tanganyika in east Africa. The male reaches 5 cm (2 in) in length, and the female only 2.5 cm (1 in) in the aquarium. In the wild, they reach only 3 centimetres (1.2 in) in standard length of male and female reaches less than 2.2 centimetres (0.87 in) in standard length. This makes them one of the smallest species within the Cichlidae family. Adults are often a light brown to beige and exhibit a characteristic dark vertical banding pattern with a bright white or blue iris and black pupil. The body is fusiform and slightly laterally compressed. Caudal fins are rounded with a single light band across the peripheral. Anal fins are also rounded and solitary, lacking a second fin. Unlike other species of African cichlids which have egg spots on the caudal fin to distract predators (such as Synodontis catfish), N. multifasciatus lay eggs within the protected interior of gastropod shells and subsequently lack egg spots. Pectoral fins are rounded and transparent while the pelvic fins are wing shaped with a white leading edge. The rear edge of both the dorsal and anal fins are drawn-out. The lateral line is straight but discontinuous. The jaw is superior (upturned) with the lower jaw extending more anterior than the upper jaw. Only one nostril can be found on each side of the head, instead of the two nostrils found in most other fish.

Juveniles lack the banding pattern of the adults and the color highlights found on the fin margins but still maintain the light tan coloration. The species is sexually monomorphic. However, males are typically larger and have slightly longer fins compared to females when fully mature. Successfully sexing fish within the aquarium trade is considered difficult and is usually done once breeding pairs have been observed. N. multifasciatus is commonly confused with Neolamprologus similis (as the name suggests). Although they look quite similar, N. similis has a larger adult size of ~ 5–7 cm (2.0–2.8 in), the banding pattern extends up to the gill plate and the dorsal fin has 2-3 dorsal spines instead of one. Additionally, N. similis has a light banding pattern on a dark background while N. multifasciatus has dark bands on a light-colored background.

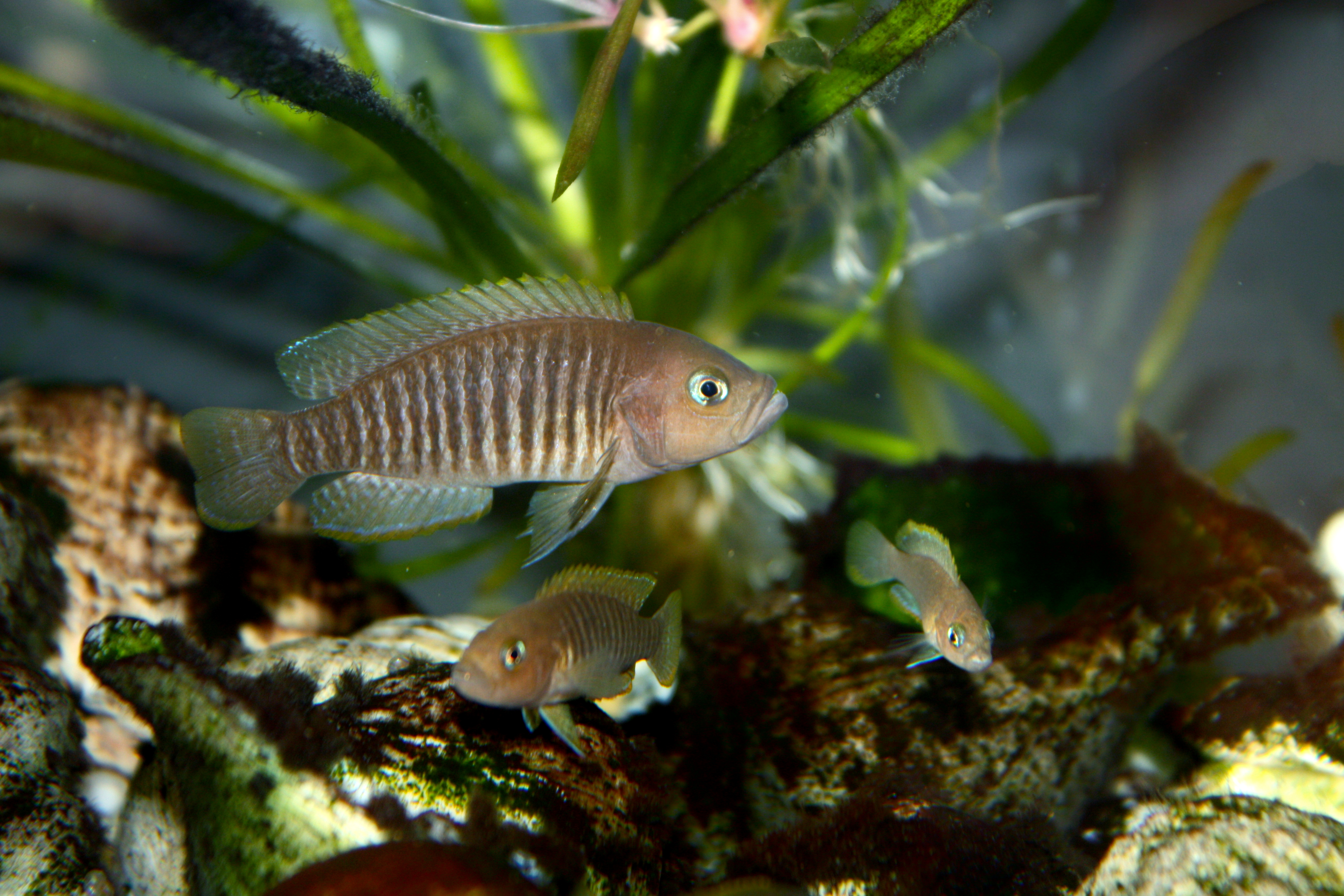
Neolamprologus multifasciatus male

== Etymology ==
Neolamprologus comes from the Greek words; "neos", meaning "young" or "new", "lampros" meaning "bright", and "logos" which denotes the white of the eye. The specific epithet refers to the banding pattern on the body and comes from the Latin "multi" meaning "many" and "fascia" meaning "striped.

== Distribution ==
The geographic range of N. multifasciatus is limited to Lake Tanganyika. They are found on sandy sediments occupying rock crevices and Neothauma shell beds throughout the margins of the lake, ranging from the littoral zone to the limnetic zone. Lake Tanganyika is very deep with an average depth of 570 m (1,870 ft) and a maximum depth of 1,470 m (4,820 ft). Most animals live along the shallow shorelines where the water is alkaline (pH of 7.5–9.0) and tropical in temperature, 75–80 °F (24–27 °C).

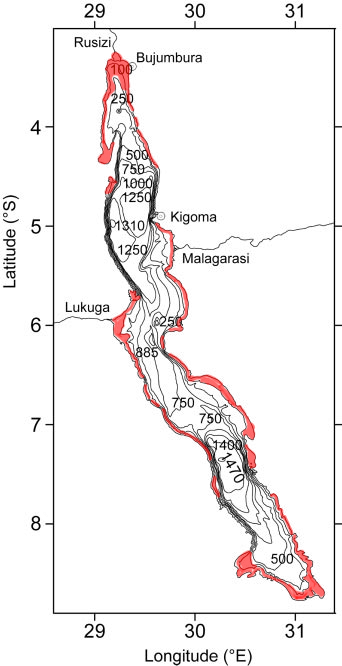
Range of Neolamprologus multifasciatus highlighted in red within the shallow margins of Lake Tanganyika, adapted from Verburg et al. 2003

== Biology ==
Its natural habitat is the Neothauma shell beds of Lake Tanganyika, where it forms huge colonies with thousands of individuals. Their unique behavior is associated with their affinity to shells. They burrow sand to move shells, take refuge in shells and also breed in them. Shell selection has been thought to be based on shell size and intactness, however recent research reveals that other characteristics, such as shell spatial position and usage by other species (heterospecifics), also play a significant role in determining shell attractiveness and quality. To address this complexity, researchers have proposed a "resource attractiveness index," which integrates multiple characteristics to better estimate the overall value of an ecological resource. To explore which shell characteristics are most sought after, researchers used 3D scanning, modeling, and printing, to create replica shells with varying structural attributes. The results show that N. multifasciatus strongly prefers intact shells, with a preference for shells that are enlarged, lengthened, or have wider apertures. Shell intactness was the most critical factor, followed by shell length and aperture width. This approach disentangles the influence of different shell features, which are usually correlated in nature, and provides a more refined method for studying animal decision-making and niche construction.

Reproduction takes place inside the shells, where complex social groups form. These groups typically consist of several reproductive males and females, a system thought to arise from the limited dispersal opportunities within the shell beds. Each breeding group is composed of one to three males with one being dominant, and up to five females, with varying amounts of juveniles and dependent offspring. Each female claims a small subterritory consisting of one or more shells, where she lays eggs and cares for the fry.

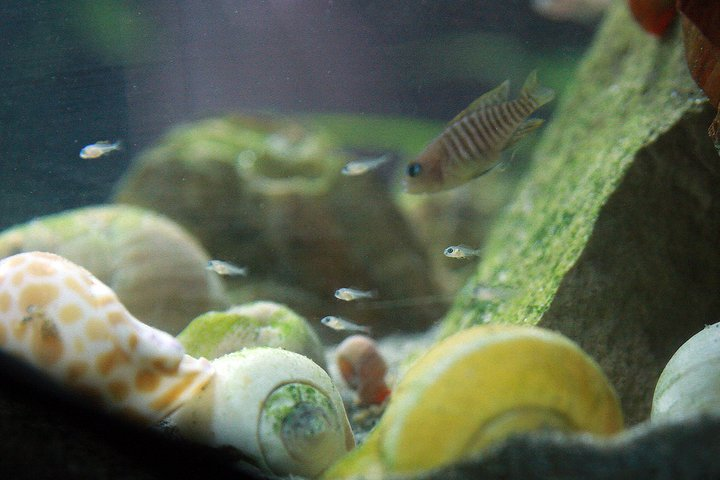
Multi babies

More aggressive individuals are able to claim larger numbers of shells, which allow them to house their offspring and expand their genetic influence within the colony. Juveniles and subadults will gradually establish their own territories as they grow, often remaining within the larger colony.

Studies have shown that the most dominant and aggressive females control the largest subterritories with the most shells, which are essential for breeding success. Females with fewer shells are more likely to leave their current territory and emigrate to another. In experiments, females that emigrated tended to secure more shells in their new territory than they had before, suggesting that females actively explore neighboring territories and move based on resource availability.

Additionally males live in "high-skew" societies, with reproduction concentrated around a few dominant breeders, while females live in "low-skew" societies. Allowing multiple females to produce offspring simultaneously. Despite close proximity between groups, extra-group reproduction is rare, indicating limited opportunities for subordinate males.

N. multifasciatus exhibits intricate breeding habits, relying on empty gastropod shells for egg laying and parental care. Brood size is generally small, approx. 5-15, with 15 being a very high number. Fry hatch in about 6–10 days. After hatching, the embryos, or "wrigglers", remain attached to the nest by mucus threads from their heads, preventing them from swimming freely. During this stage, the parents fan, clean, and turn the eggs and young to maintain optimal conditions. Parents also use their mouths to taste the eggs, identifying dead or diseased ones for removal, while turning the eggs to distribute nutrients for better development.

The hatched young absorb their yolk sacs for nutrition while stuck to the nest before their adhesive threads dissolve, at which point they become free-swimming. Once mobile, the fry venture out of the nest under close parental supervision. In some cases, parents may relocate their brood to different sites within the territory, a behavior thought to protect the young from predators. Throughout the early stages, both parents practice biparental substrate guarding, protecting their offspring from the fertilized egg stage to the free-swimming phase.

== Feeding habits ==
Neolamprologus multifasciatus primarily feeds on zooplankton, which drifts by their colonies in the water currents. The abundance of shells in their environment allows them to remain within the safety of the colony while taking advantage of this readily available food source. Their diet primarily consists of tiny planktonic organisms, which provide the necessary nutrients for growth and reproduction.

== Conservation status ==
Neolamprologus multifasciatus is currently listed as "Least Concern" by the International Union for Conservation of Nature (IUCN) due to its stable population and adaptability. The species thrives in the extensive shell bed habitats of Lake Tanganyika, where its colonies can reach thousands of individuals. These shell beds, particularly composed of Neothauma tanganyicense shells, provide essential breeding and shelter sites for the fish.

== Threats to the species ==
Despite its stable population, N. multifasciatus, like other species in Lake Tanganyika, faces indirect threats from environmental degradation. The lake's ecosystem is under pressure from overfishing, deforestation-induced sedimentation, pollution from urban sewage and industrial waste, and climate change.

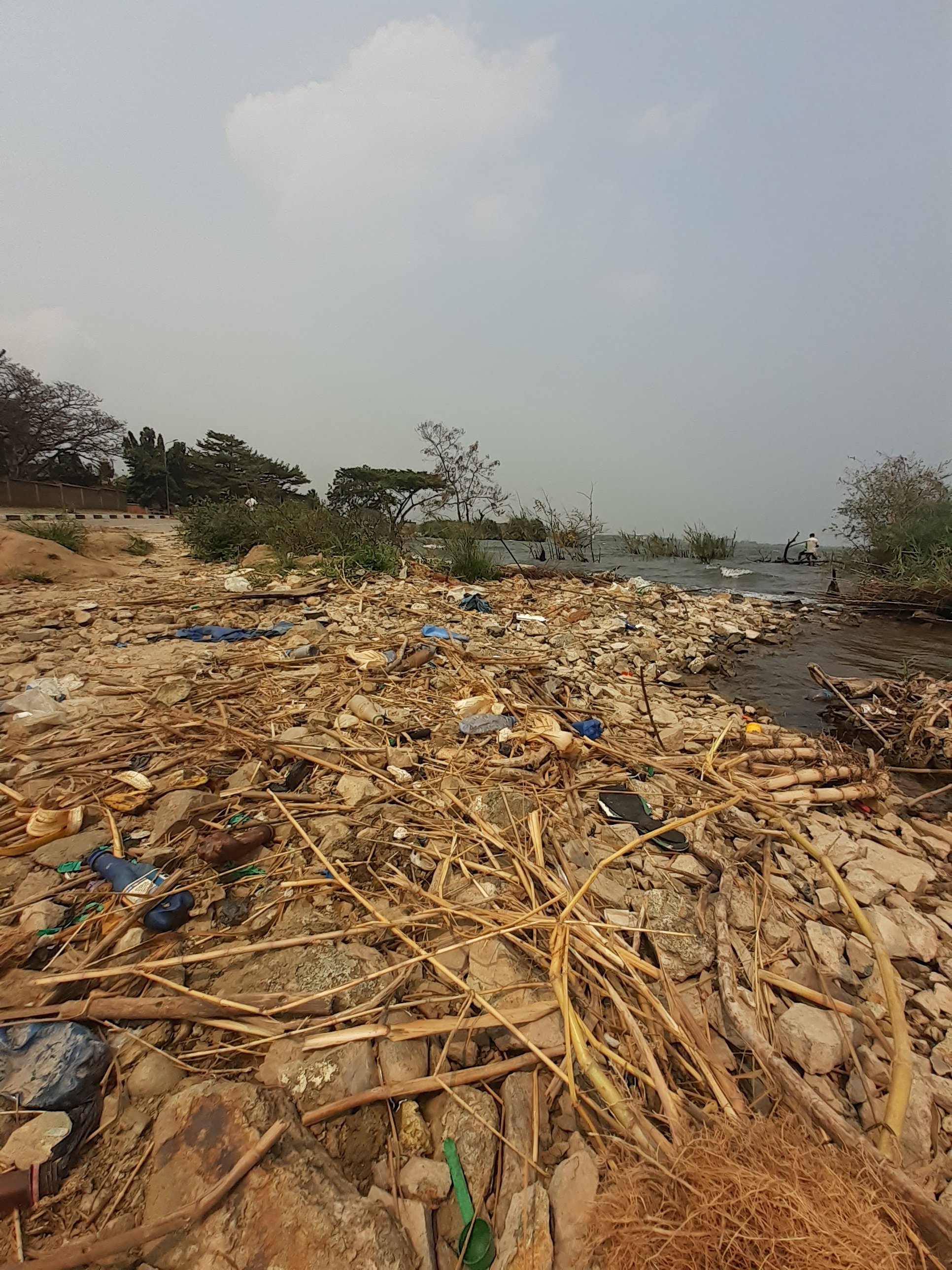
Soil and water pollution at Lake Tanganyika.

These human-induced activities degrade water quality and affect the littoral habitats where most species, including N. multifasciatus, are found. While N. multifasciatus remains resilient due to its adaptable nature and widespread habitat, ongoing efforts to protect Lake Tanganyika's environment are crucial to ensuring the long-term survival.

== Relevance to humans ==
In the aquarium trade N. multifasciatus are commonly known as "multies" and are moderately popular. Stores specializing in fish or quality fish stores will at least be aware of shell dwelling fish even if they are not stocked at that time. They are not as popular as larger cichlids but because they are suitable for smaller tanks and due to their prolific nature they still are widely available. Tank requirements are very similar to other African cichlids, such as the Mbuna. Unique requirements include a sandy substrate for burrowing and the placement of shells. A tank should have at least one shell per fish, ideally two. Two other species of fish are similar to N. multifasciatus; N. similis and N. brevis. The three species are similar enough that stores normally sell them all under the common name "shellies" or "shell dwellers".

== See also ==
- List of freshwater aquarium fish species
