= Neolamprologus buescheri =

Conservation status
- Data Deficient (IUCN 3.1)

Scientific classification
- Kingdom: Animalia
- Phylum: Chordata
- Class: Actinopterygii
- Order: Cichliformes
- Family: Cichlidae
- Genus: Neolamprologus
- Species: N. buescheri

Binomial name
- Neolamprologus buescheri (Staeck, 1983)

Synonyms
- Lamprologus buescheri Staeck, 1983

Species of fish

Neolamprologus buescheri is a species of cichlid endemic to Lake Tanganyika. This species can reach a length of 8 centimetres (3.1 in) TL. It can also be found in the aquarium trade. The specific name of this cichlid honours the collector of its type, the German ichthyologist Heinz H. Büscher.
