= Neolamprologus ventralis =

Conservation status
- Least Concern (IUCN 3.1)

Scientific classification
- Kingdom: Animalia
- Phylum: Chordata
- Class: Actinopterygii
- Order: Cichliformes
- Family: Cichlidae
- Genus: Neolamprologus
- Species: N. ventralis

Binomial name
- Neolamprologus ventralis (Büscher, 1995)

Species of fish

Neolamprologus ventralis is a species of cichlid endemic to Lake Tanganyika. This species can reach a length of 8.0 centimetres (3.1 in) TL. This species can also be found in the aquarium trade.
