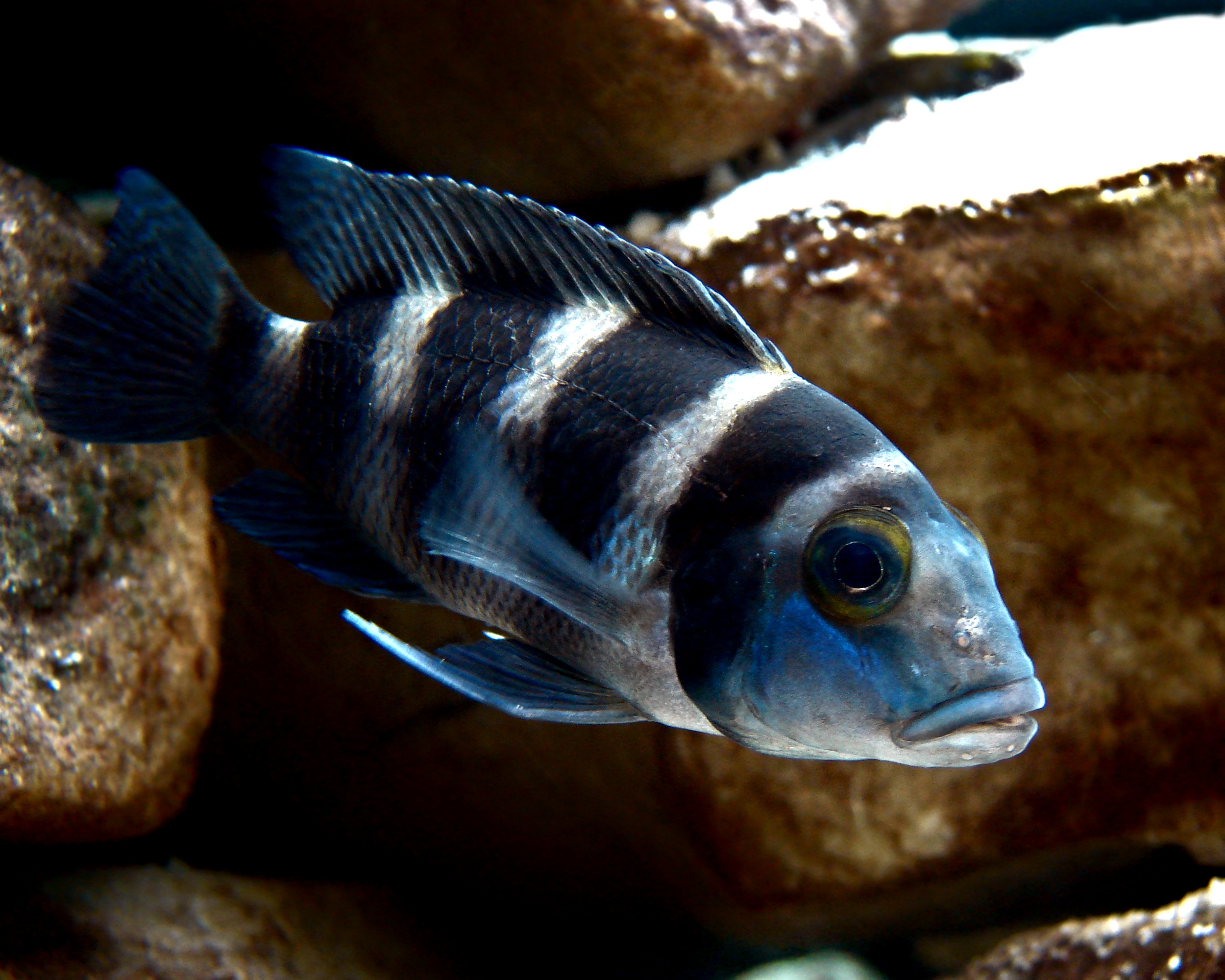

Conservation status
- Least Concern (IUCN 3.1)

Scientific classification
- Kingdom: Animalia
- Phylum: Chordata
- Class: Actinopterygii
- Order: Cichliformes
- Family: Cichlidae
- Genus: Neolamprologus
- Species: N. tretocephalus

Binomial name
- Neolamprologus tretocephalus (Boulenger, 1898)

Synonyms
- Lamprologus tretocephalus Boulenger, 1899

= Neolamprologus tretocephalus =

Species of fish

Neolamprologus tretocephalus is a species of cichlid endemic to Lake Tanganyika where it is found in sandy areas in the northern half of the lake. It is a predator on molluscs. This species can reach a length of 15 centimetres (5.9 in) TL. This species can also be found in the aquarium trade.
