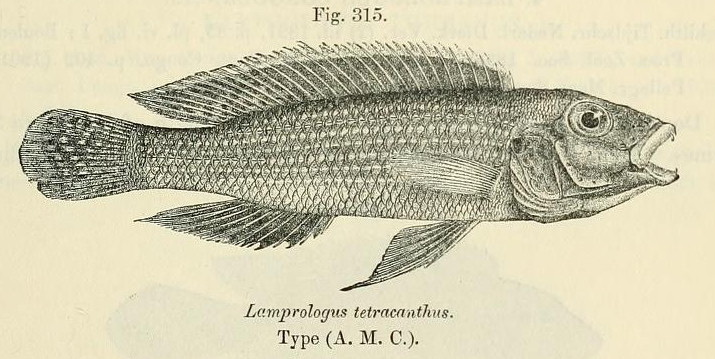

Conservation status
- Least Concern (IUCN 3.1)

Scientific classification
- Kingdom: Animalia
- Phylum: Chordata
- Class: Actinopterygii
- Order: Cichliformes
- Family: Cichlidae
- Genus: Neolamprologus
- Species: N. tetracanthus

Binomial name
- Neolamprologus tetracanthus (Boulenger, 1899)

Synonyms
- Lamprologus tetracanthus Boulenger, 1899; Lamprologus brevianalis Boulenger, 1906; Lamprologus marginatus Boulenger, 1914

= Fourspine cichlid =

Species of fish

The fourspine cichlid (Neolamprologus tetracanthus) is a species of cichlid endemic to Lake Tanganyika where it lives in areas with sandy substrates. In addition to feeding on other fishes and insect larvae, this species is specialized to suck molluscs from their shells. This species can reach a length of 20 centimetres (7.9 in) TL. This species can also be found in the aquarium trade.
