= Neolamprologus signatus =

Conservation status
- Least Concern (IUCN 3.1)

Scientific classification
- Kingdom: Animalia
- Phylum: Chordata
- Class: Actinopterygii
- Order: Cichliformes
- Family: Cichlidae
- Genus: Neolamprologus
- Species: N. signatus

Binomial name
- Neolamprologus signatus (Poll, 1952)

Synonyms
- Lamprologus signatus

Species of fish

Neolamprologus signatus is a species of cichlid endemic to Lake Tanganyika where it prefers deep waters over muddy substrates. This species is a shell dweller. This species can reach a length of 5.5 centimetres (2.2 in) TL. It can also be found in the aquarium trade.
