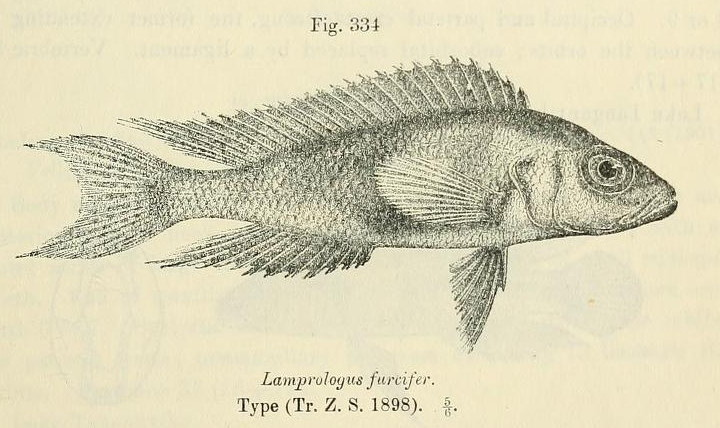

Conservation status
- Least Concern (IUCN 3.1)

Scientific classification
- Kingdom: Animalia
- Phylum: Chordata
- Class: Actinopterygii
- Order: Cichliformes
- Family: Cichlidae
- Genus: Neolamprologus
- Species: N. furcifer

Binomial name
- Neolamprologus furcifer (Boulenger, 1898)

Synonyms
- Lamprologus furcifer Boulenger, 1898

= Neolamprologus furcifer =

Species of fish

Neolamprologus furcifer is a species of cichlid endemic to Lake Tanganyika where it prefers to live solitarily in lightless cracks, crevices, caves, etc. where it feed on other organisms that also dwell in that habitat. This species can reach a length of 15 centimetres (5.9 in) TL. This species can also be found in the aquarium trade, where it is a highly sought-after species.
