= Neolamprologus helianthus =

Scientific classification
- Domain: Eukaryota
- Kingdom: Animalia
- Phylum: Chordata
- Class: Actinopterygii
- Order: Cichliformes
- Family: Cichlidae
- Genus: Neolamprologus
- Species: N. helianthus

Binomial name
- Neolamprologus helianthus Büscher, 1997

Species of fish

Neolamprologus helianthus is a species of cichlid endemic to Lake Tanganyika where it is usually found in shallow, rocky habitats. It never strays far from the rocky substrate. Adults do not appear to form schools. The fish is omnivorous. This species can reach a length of 5.7 centimetres (2.2 in) TL. This species can also be found in the aquarium trade.
