= Neolamprologus kungweensis =

Conservation status
- Least Concern (IUCN 3.1)

Scientific classification
- Kingdom: Animalia
- Phylum: Chordata
- Class: Actinopterygii
- Order: Cichliformes
- Family: Cichlidae
- Genus: Neolamprologus
- Species: N. kungweensis

Binomial name
- Neolamprologus kungweensis (Poll, 1956)

Synonyms
- Lamprologus kungweensis

Species of fish

Neolamprologus kungweensis is a species of cichlid endemic to Lake Tanganyika where it is known from the northwestern part of the lake in Kungwe Bay, Kigoma, Tanzania where it can be found living in shells. This species reaches a length of 8 centimetres (3.1 in) TL. This species can also be found in the aquarium trade.
