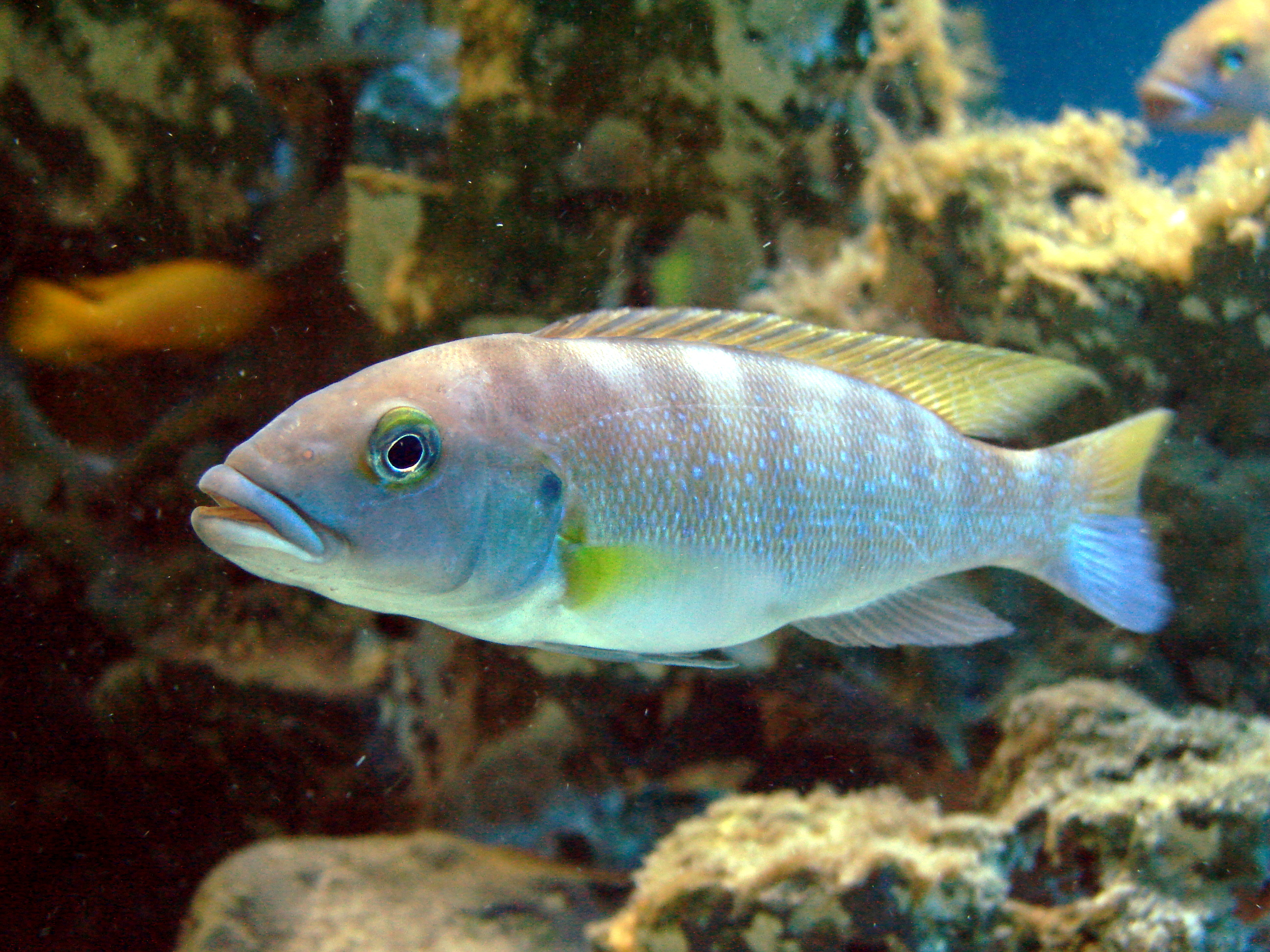

Conservation status
- Least Concern (IUCN 3.1)

Scientific classification
- Kingdom: Animalia
- Phylum: Chordata
- Class: Actinopterygii
- Order: Cichliformes
- Family: Cichlidae
- Genus: Neolamprologus
- Species: N. cunningtoni

Binomial name
- Neolamprologus cunningtoni (Boulenger, 1906)

Synonyms
- Lamprologus cunningtoni Boulenger, 1906; Lepidiolamprologus cunningtoni (Boulenger, 1906)

= Neolamprologus cunningtoni =

Species of fish

Neolamprologus cunningtoni is a species of cichlid endemic to Lake Tanganyika where it prefers areas with sandy substrates in which it digs crater-shaped nests. This carnivorous species takes fish as prey. This species can reach a length of 29.1 centimetres (11.5 in) TL. This species inclusion in this genus has been questioned based upon its lacking many of the characteristics of its congeners. It can also be found in the aquarium trade. The specific name of this fish honours the British zoologist William Alfred Cunnington (1877-1958), who collected the type on an expedition to Lake Tanganyika.
