= Neolamprologus pectoralis =

Conservation status
- Least Concern (IUCN 3.1)

Scientific classification
- Kingdom: Animalia
- Phylum: Chordata
- Class: Actinopterygii
- Order: Cichliformes
- Family: Cichlidae
- Genus: Neolamprologus
- Species: N. pectoralis

Binomial name
- Neolamprologus pectoralis Büscher, 1991

Synonyms
- Lamprologus pectoralis (Büscher, 1991)

Species of fish

Neolamprologus pectoralis is a species of cichlid endemic to Lake Tanganyika where it is usually found along the lakes southwestern coast in the Democratic Republic of the Congo. This species can reach a length of 14.0 centimetres (5.5 in) TL. This species can also be found in the aquarium trade.
