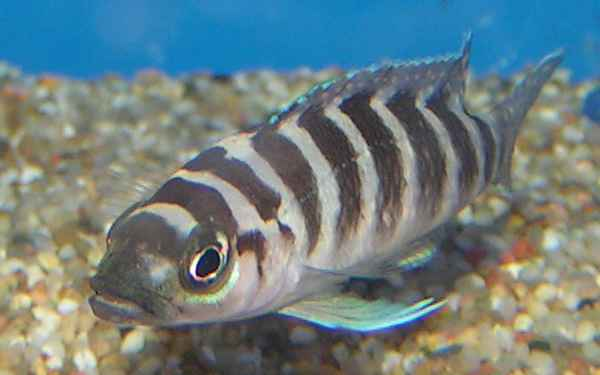

Conservation status
- Least Concern (IUCN 3.1)

Scientific classification
- Kingdom: Animalia
- Phylum: Chordata
- Class: Actinopterygii
- Order: Cichliformes
- Family: Cichlidae
- Genus: Neolamprologus
- Species: N. cylindricus

Binomial name
- Neolamprologus cylindricus Staeck & Seegers, 1986

Synonyms
- Lamprologus cylindricus

= Neolamprologus cylindricus =

Species of fish

Neolamprologus cylindricus is a species of cichlid endemic to Lake Tanganyika where it is only known to occur in the southeastern part of the lake. It prefers to live in recesses in the substrate and eats small benthic invertebrates. It lays its eggs in caves. It keeps close to the rocky bottom of the lake, mainly in depths less than 10 metres (30 ft). This species can reach a length of 10.4 centimetres (4.1 in) TL. This species can also be found in the aquarium trade.
