= Neolamprologus prochilus =

Conservation status
- Least Concern (IUCN 3.1)

Scientific classification
- Kingdom: Animalia
- Phylum: Chordata
- Class: Actinopterygii
- Order: Cichliformes
- Family: Cichlidae
- Genus: Neolamprologus
- Species: N. prochilus

Binomial name
- Neolamprologus prochilus (R. M. Bailey & D. J. Stewart, 1977)

Synonyms
- Lamprologus prochilus Bailey & Stewart, 1977

Species of fish

Neolamprologus prochilus is a species of cichlid endemic to Lake Tanganyika, where it is only known to occur in Zambian waters in the southern part of the lake. It is a cave dweller found at depths of from 5 to 40 metres (16 to 131 ft). This species can reach a length of 17 centimetres (6.7 in) TL.
