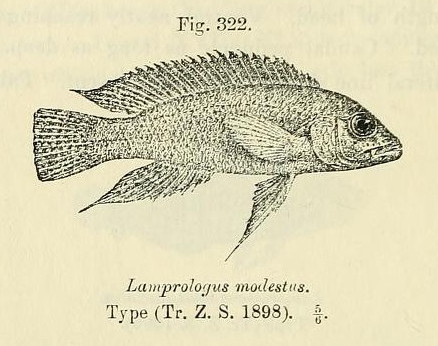

Conservation status
- Least Concern (IUCN 3.1)

Scientific classification
- Kingdom: Animalia
- Phylum: Chordata
- Class: Actinopterygii
- Order: Cichliformes
- Family: Cichlidae
- Genus: Neolamprologus
- Species: N. modestus

Binomial name
- Neolamprologus modestus (Boulenger, 1898)

Synonyms
- Lamprologus modestus Boulenger, 1898

= Neolamprologus modestus =

Species of fish

Neolamprologus modestus is a species of cichlid endemic to Lake Tanganyika where it lives on rocky substrates in the southern portion of the lake. It breeds in areas with sandy substrates. Generally eating small snails, it also specializes on eating the eggs of Lamprichthys tanganicanus, a species of killifish. Males of this species can reach a length of 12 centimetres (4.7 in) TL while the females only grow to 10 centimetres (3.9 in) TL. This species can also be found in the aquarium trade.
