= Neolamprologus cancellatus =

Conservation status
- Data Deficient (IUCN 3.1)

Scientific classification
- Kingdom: Animalia
- Phylum: Chordata
- Class: Actinopterygii
- Order: Cichliformes
- Family: Cichlidae
- Genus: Neolamprologus
- Species: N. cancellatus

Binomial name
- Neolamprologus cancellatus Aibara, T. Takahashi & Nakaya, 2005

Species of fish

Neolamprologus cancellatus is a species of cichlid endemic to Lake Tanganyika where it is usually found in the Wonzye Point area of Zambia. This species can reach a length of 5.7 centimetres (2.2 in) TL. This species can also be found in the aquarium trade.
