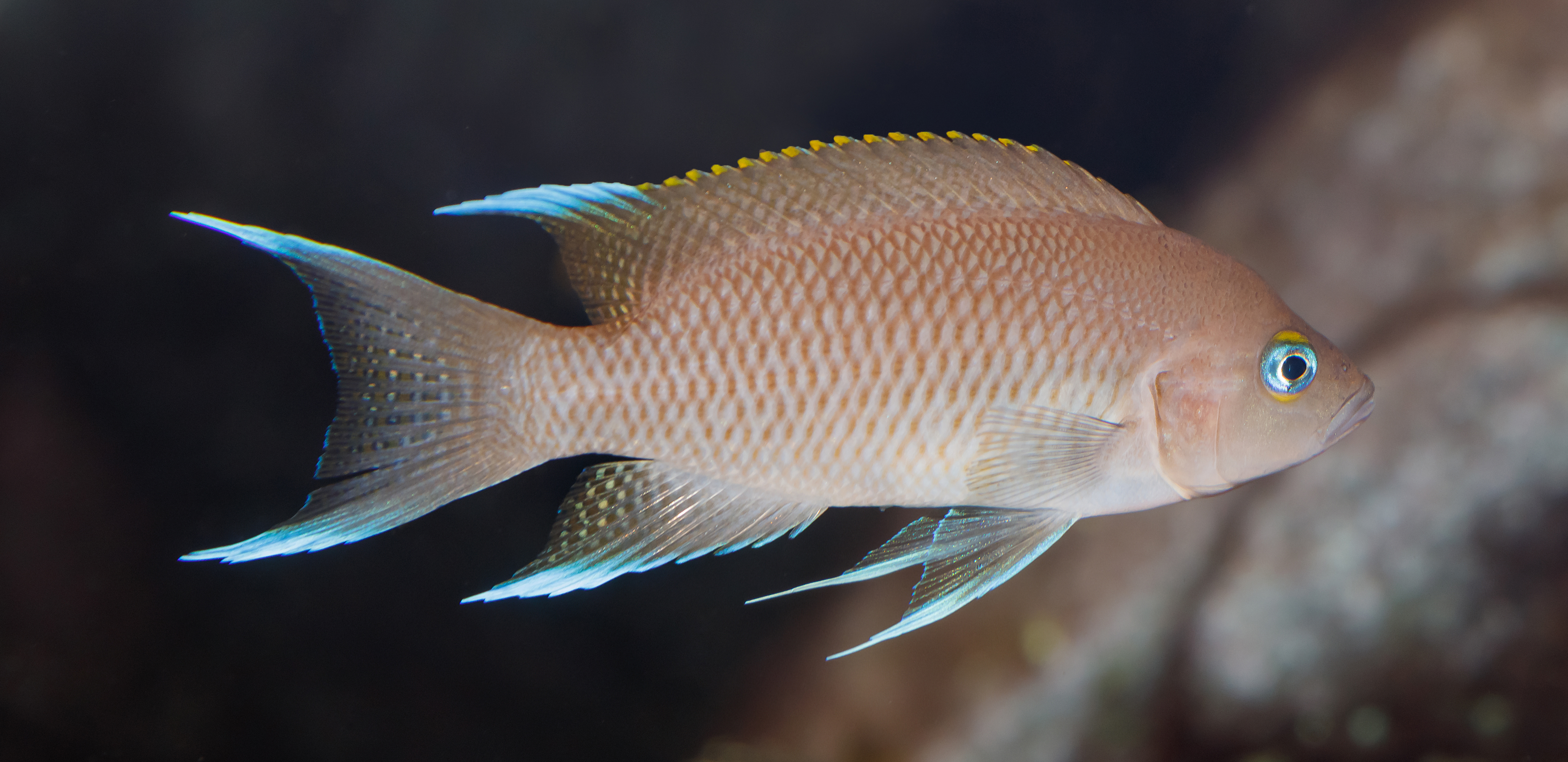

Conservation status
- Least Concern (IUCN 3.1)

Scientific classification
- Kingdom: Animalia
- Phylum: Chordata
- Class: Actinopterygii
- Order: Cichliformes
- Family: Cichlidae
- Genus: Neolamprologus
- Species: N. marunguensis

Binomial name
- Neolamprologus marunguensis Büscher, 1989

= Neolamprologus marunguensis =

Species of fish

Neolamprologus marunguensis is a species of cichlid endemic to Lake Tanganyika, Eastern Africa, where it is usually found in the rocky habitat at a depth of between 25 and 35 meters (82 and 115 ft). This species can reach a length of 6.7 centimetres (2.6 in) TL. This species can also be found in the aquarium trade.
