= Neolamprologus bifasciatus =

Conservation status
- Least Concern (IUCN 3.1)

Scientific classification
- Kingdom: Animalia
- Phylum: Chordata
- Class: Actinopterygii
- Order: Cichliformes
- Family: Cichlidae
- Genus: Neolamprologus
- Species: N. bifasciatus

Binomial name
- Neolamprologus bifasciatus Büscher, 1993

Species of fish

Neolamprologus bifasciatus is a species of cichlid endemic to Lake Tanganyika where it is usually found at depths from 30 to 45 metres (100 to 150 ft) at the bottom edge of the rocky habitat where it meets the sandy and or muddy substrate. It is rarely found in water shallower than this. it is most often seen by itself. This species can reach a length of 10 centimetres (3.9 in) TL. This species can also be found in the aquarium trade.
