= Neolamprologus finalimus =

Conservation status
- Data Deficient (IUCN 3.1)

Scientific classification
- Kingdom: Animalia
- Phylum: Chordata
- Class: Actinopterygii
- Order: Cichliformes
- Family: Cichlidae
- Genus: Neolamprologus
- Species: N. finalimus

Binomial name
- Neolamprologus finalimus Nichols & La Monte, 1931

Synonyms
- Lamprologus finalimus

Species of fish

Neolamprologus finalimus is a little-known species of cichlid endemic to Lake Tanganyika where it is currently known only from its type locality - Uvira, Democratic Republic of the Congo - on the northern tip of the lake. The only known specimen, the holotype, was 4.5 centimetres (1.8 in) in total length.
