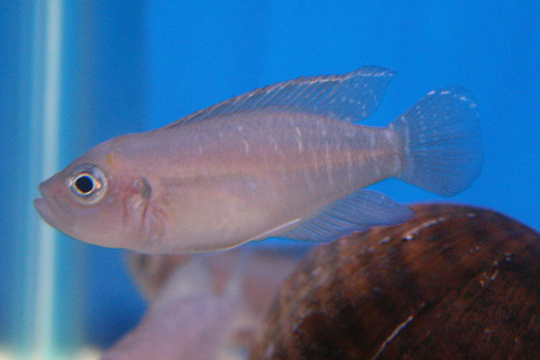

Conservation status
- Least Concern (IUCN 3.1)

Scientific classification
- Kingdom: Animalia
- Phylum: Chordata
- Class: Actinopterygii
- Order: Cichliformes
- Family: Cichlidae
- Genus: Neolamprologus
- Species: N. brevis

Binomial name
- Neolamprologus brevis (Boulenger, 1899)

Synonyms
- Lamprologus brevis Boulenger, 1899; Lamprologus calliurus Boulenger, 1906; Neolamprologus calliurus (Boulenger, 1906); Lamprologus taeniurus Boulenger, 1914

= Neolamprologus brevis =

Species of fish

Neolamprologus brevis is a species of cichlid endemic to Lake Tanganyika where it lives in snail shells, primarily of the genus Neothauma. It feeds is on zooplankton. This species can reach a length of 5.5 centimetres (2.2 in) TL. This species can also be found in the aquarium trade. The males are much larger than the females and can be identified even at a young age.
