= Tropheus brichardi =

Conservation status
- Least Concern (IUCN 3.1)

Scientific classification
- Kingdom: Animalia
- Phylum: Chordata
- Class: Actinopterygii
- Order: Cichliformes
- Family: Cichlidae
- Genus: Tropheus
- Species: T. brichardi

Binomial name
- Tropheus brichardi Nelissen & Thys van den Audenaerde, 1975

Species of fish

Tropheus brichardi is a species of cichlid endemic to Lake Tanganyika where it is found in areas with substrates of solid rock in the central portion of the lake. This species can reach a length of 10 cm (3.9 in). It can be found in the aquarium trade. The specific name honours Pierre Brichard (1921–1990) the aquarium fish exporter who provided the authors with the type.
