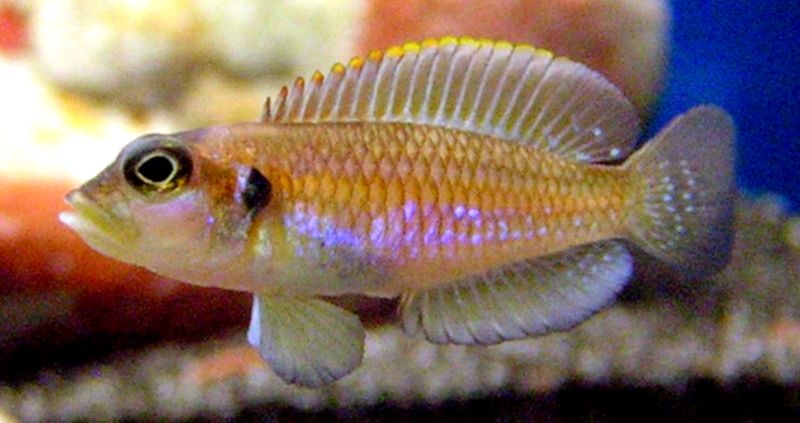

Conservation status
- Least Concern (IUCN 3.1)

Scientific classification
- Kingdom: Animalia
- Phylum: Chordata
- Class: Actinopterygii
- Order: Cichliformes
- Family: Cichlidae
- Genus: Neolamprologus
- Species: N. ocellatus

Binomial name
- Neolamprologus ocellatus (Steindachner, 1909)

Synonyms
- Lamprologus ocellatus

= Neolamprologus ocellatus =

Species of fish

Neolamprologus ocellatus is a species of shell dwelling cichlid endemic to Lake Tanganyika. It is a popular aquarium fish due to its small size, appearance, and intelligence.

Juveniles measure about 6 millimetres (0.24 in) at hatching, while adults grow up to 5.8 centimetres (2.3 in) TL. They range in color from a light brownish color to a gold/yellow color. These fish, like all shell dwellers, live in snail shells. They live in colonies amongst each other and raise their young in the shells.

Male Neolamprologus ocellatus are larger, and have a yellow edge on the dorsal fin.

== Aquarium care ==
Neolamprologus ocellatus are identified as African Cichlids in the aquarium trade. They are not a beginner's species. Instead, they appear in the tanks of more advanced hobbyists who specialize in fish hailing from Lake Tanganyika.

=== General tank requirements ===
Neolamprologus ocellatus can be maintained in aquariums as small as 5 US gallons (19 L), although this would severely limit the number of specimens. One empty aquatic snail shell should be provided for each individual, along with a thin layer of silica sand. Sand is not required for these fish to survive in captivity, but it allows them to display natural behavior. Neolamprologus ocellatus use propeller-like motions of the tail to bury the shells that they reside in. This cannot be accomplished with heavier and larger-grain gravel.

These fish are not considered to be an aggressive species in captivity. However, they will defend the shells that comprise their physical territory. They have even been known to attack the hands of aquarists.

=== Water quality ===
Neolamprologus ocellatus require the same water chemistry as other Tanganyikan species. The pH should be between 8.0 and 8.3 at a minimum (Lake Tanganyika's pH ranges between 8.7 and 9.4). Mineral hardness, or kH, should be between 12 and 14. Temperature should be between 23–27 °C (73–81 °F).

Like all Tanganyikans, N. ocellatus are quite sensitive to the nitrogen cycle. The presence of ammonia or nitrite can prove toxic to them. For this reason, good maintenance practices should be used. Adequate filtration is a necessity.

=== Feeding ===
N. ocellatus are omnivorous, and will accept a wide variety of prepared aquarium foods including: flake, small pellets, frozen foods and live brine shrimp or daphnia. New specimens may exhibit a reluctance to eat, and can be most effectively tempted with live food.

In the home aquarium they should be fed according to the same nutritional principles as other African Cichlids. Namely: Tubifex worms should never be offered, as they can cause fatal systemic bacterial diseases. High protein diets or diets that exclude vegetable matter should be avoided. The fish should be fed as much as they can consume in five minutes, and overfeeding should be avoided. A weekly fast day can be beneficial, as it allows the intestinal tract to be purged. Finally, Lamprologus ocellatus are similar to other African Cichlids in that their coloring will benefit from a diet containing quantities of beta-carotene and canthaxanthin.

=== Tankmates ===
It is critical that N. ocellatus not be kept with more aggressive, predatory or larger tankmates. Due to their tiny size, they would either be eaten or harassed. It is also inappropriate to keep these fish with Mbuna, the larger cichlids that hail from neighboring Lake Malawi. Greatest success will be achieved if tankmates from the natural biotope of this species are used. Good choices include (but are not limited to) variants of the Julidochromis, Cyprichromis and Synodontis genera.

=== Breeding ===
It is possible to breed N. ocellatus in captivity. Males of this species spawn with more than one female at a time, and do so in or near the females' shells. Eggs are laid inside the shell, and take approximately three days to hatch. The fry are free swimming in one week. It is possible to feed the fry with a turkey baster containing baby brine shrimp.

== See also ==
- List of freshwater aquarium fish species
