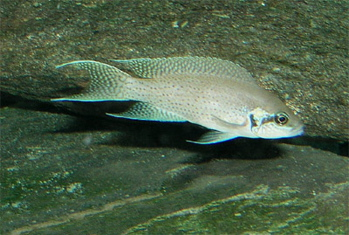
- "Pemba" Race

Conservation status
- Least Concern (IUCN 3.1)

Scientific classification
- Kingdom: Animalia
- Phylum: Chordata
- Class: Actinopterygii
- Order: Cichliformes
- Family: Cichlidae
- Genus: Neolamprologus
- Species: N. brichardi

Binomial name
- Neolamprologus brichardi (Poll, 1974)

= Neolamprologus brichardi =

Species of fish

Neolamprologus brichardi is a species of cichlid endemic to the alkaline waters of Lake Tanganyika in East Africa. It is a popular aquarium fish kept in the fishkeeping hobby, where it is known under a variety of common names including Princess cichlid, Princess of Burundi, Lyretail cichlid, Fairy cichlid and Brichard's lamprologus. In addition, the species is also the subject of numerous studies on fish behaviour. It is closely related to N. pulcher from the southern half of Lake Tanganyika (N. brichardi is more widespread) and some have recommended merging the two into a single species.

== Behaviour ==
N. brichardi is notable in a number of ways:

This fish is a substrate spawner (lays eggs on a substrate), utilizing the rocky rubble to do so. When nesting, the species exhibits brood protection typical of many cichlid species, including aggressive territorial defensive behaviour, particularly towards conspecifics encroaching on its small territory (which typically extends to no more than a few square metres). However, the species lacks the hyper-territoriality associated with some Rift Lake cichlids and, when away from the nesting site, is notably non-aggressive towards its own species; in fact it is one of the few substrate-spawning cichlids that also schools. It is not unheard of to find a school numbering near 100,000 individuals within a 50 metres (160 ft) square area.

It is one of the few fish in Africa that utilizes a collective nursery. This means that adults, sub-adults, and even half-grown fry all participate in a multi-generational rearing of the fry. N. brichardi individuals not only care for their own fry but also the fry of those around them, all while keeping vigil over other adults still actively spawning. This is similar to the cooperative breeding system of a related species of cichlid, N. pulcher, in that N. pulcher individuals will care for the offspring of others.

N. brichardi specializes in feeding from the rocky biocover, picking at small crustaceans and invertebrates. It will also feed on swarms of plankton when available.

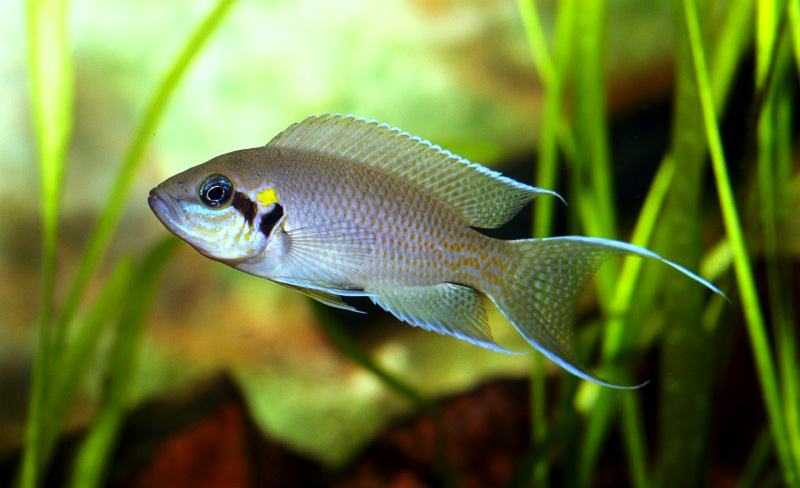

== Etymology ==
The specific name honours Pierre Brichard (1921-1990), an aquarium fish exporter based near Lake Tanganyika.

== See also ==
- List of freshwater aquarium fish species
- Lamprologus
