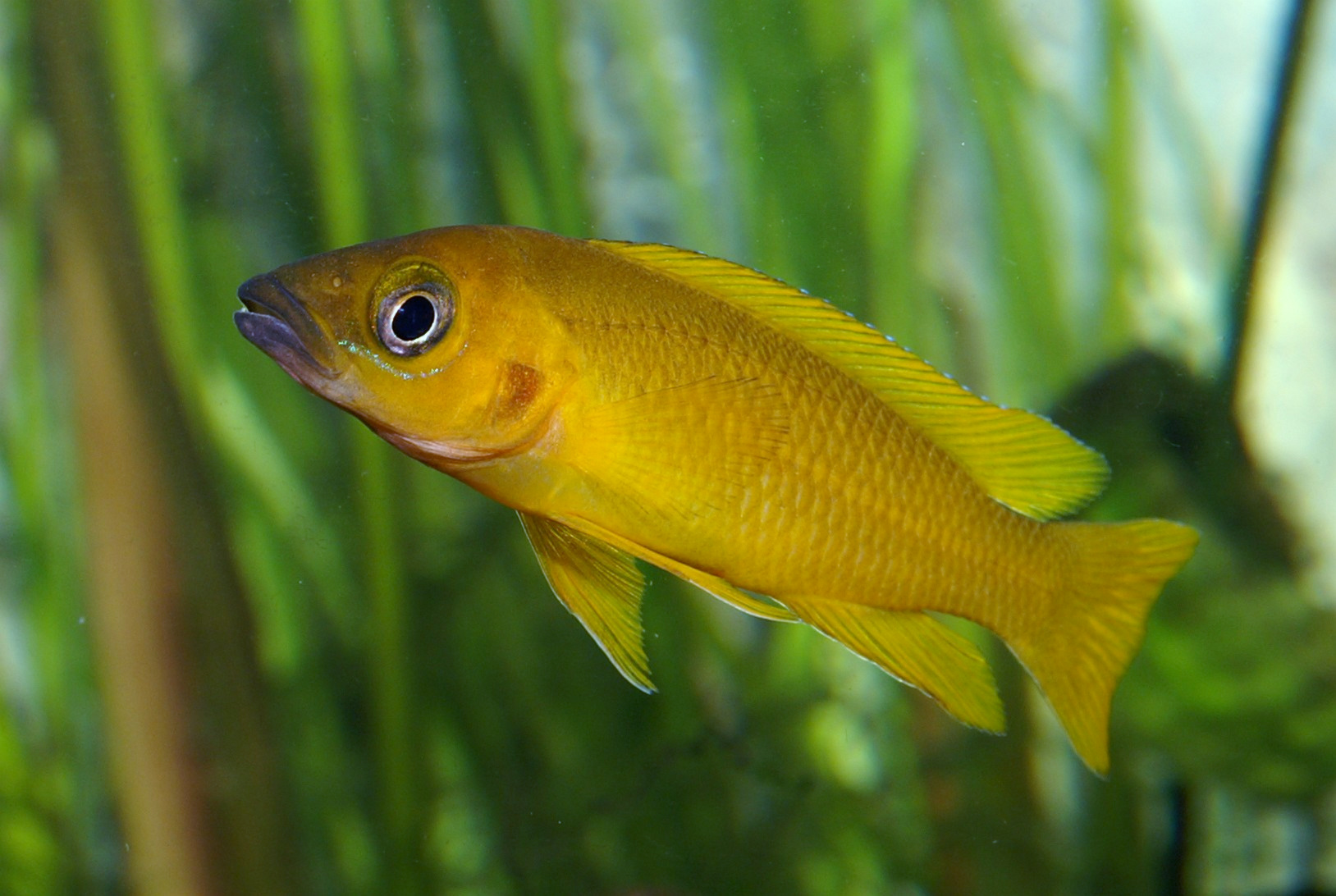

Conservation status
- Least Concern (IUCN 3.1)

Scientific classification
- Kingdom: Animalia
- Phylum: Chordata
- Class: Actinopterygii
- Order: Cichliformes
- Family: Cichlidae
- Genus: Neolamprologus
- Species: N. longior

Binomial name
- Neolamprologus longior (Staeck, 1980)

Synonyms
- Lamprologus leleupi longior Staeck, 1980 Neolamprologus leleupi longior (Staeck, 1980)

= Neolamprologus longior =

Species of fish

Neolamprologus longior is a species of cichlid endemic to Lake Tanganyika and found at Kabogo Point and Kibwe Bay. This species can reach a length of 9 centimetres (3.5 in) TL. It can also be found in the aquarium trade.
