= Neolamprologus variostigma =

Conservation status
- Near Threatened (IUCN 3.1)

Scientific classification
- Kingdom: Animalia
- Phylum: Chordata
- Class: Actinopterygii
- Order: Cichliformes
- Family: Cichlidae
- Genus: Neolamprologus
- Species: N. variostigma

Binomial name
- Neolamprologus variostigma Büscher, 1995

Synonyms
- Lepidiolamprologus variostigma

Species of fish

Neolamprologus variostigma is a species of cichlid endemic to Lake Tanganyika where it is usually found at a depth of around 45 metres (150 ft). It is found on the Democratic Republic of the Congo coast line. This species can reach a length of 7.3 centimetres (2.9 in) TL. This species can also be found in the aquarium trade.
