= Neolamprologus callipterus =

Conservation status
- Least Concern (IUCN 3.1)

Scientific classification
- Kingdom: Animalia
- Phylum: Chordata
- Class: Actinopterygii
- Order: Cichliformes
- Family: Cichlidae
- Genus: Neolamprologus
- Species: N. callipterus

Binomial name
- Neolamprologus callipterus (Boulenger, 1906)

Synonyms
- Lamprologus callipterus

Species of fish

Neolamprologus callipterus is a species of cichlid endemic to Lake Tanganyika where it very actively moves about in search of crustaceans and other invertebrates. Males of this species can reach a length of 12.4 centimetres (4.9 in) TL while the females only grow to 4.5 centimetres (1.8 in) TL (see below). This fish can also be found in the aquarium trade, though it is considered to be poorly suited for captivity.

== Physiology ==
These fish exhibit strong sexual dimorphism. Its males are significantly larger than females, the reason being that males of the species collect empty snail shells for the females to breed in. Therefore, males have to be large and strong enough to transport shells, while females have to be small enough to fit in the shells. Immature males will form schools that may exceed 100 individuals. These schools roam around, leaving a trail of destruction as they feed on insect larvae, crustaceans, and juvenile cichlids.
