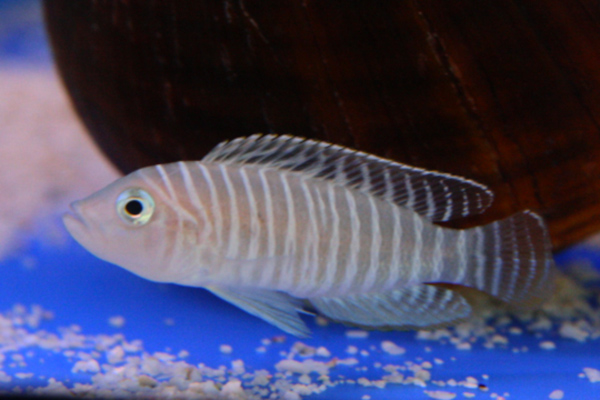

Conservation status
- Least Concern (IUCN 3.1)

Scientific classification
- Kingdom: Animalia
- Phylum: Chordata
- Class: Actinopterygii
- Order: Cichliformes
- Family: Cichlidae
- Genus: Neolamprologus
- Species: N. similis

Binomial name
- Neolamprologus similis Büscher, 1992

Synonyms
- Lamprologus similis (Büscher, 1992)

= Neolamprologus similis =

Species of fish

Neolamprologus similis is a shell-dwelling cichlid endemic to Lake Tanganyika in Africa, where it is only known along the shores of the Democratic Republic of the Congo and Tanzania. N. similis is copper-coloured with vertical white stripes running from the head to the base of the tail. It can reach up to 5 centimetres (2.0 in) in total length, and it is a popular freshwater aquarium fish.

== Breeding habits ==
This fish is monomorphic: males and females are not visually different (males are bigger) and form small colonies or harems—depending on available space—in which the male fry are tolerated until they become active competitors of the male. Female fry are not only tolerated but are eventually courted as mates. The females also are objects of interest to neighboring males and may be targets of theft.
