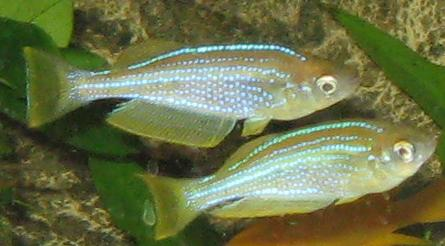
- Lamprichthys tanganicanus

Conservation status
- Least Concern (IUCN 3.1)

Scientific classification
- Kingdom: Animalia
- Phylum: Chordata
- Class: Actinopterygii
- Order: Cyprinodontiformes
- Family: Procatopodidae
- Subfamily: Procatopodinae
- Genus: Lamprichthys; Regan, 1911
- Species: L. tanganicanus

Binomial name
- Lamprichthys tanganicanus (Boulenger, 1898)

= Tanganyika killifish =

Species of fish

The Tanganyika killifish (Lamprichthys tanganicanus) is a species of procatopodid endemic to Lake Tanganyika, where it forms large schools, mainly close to rocky shores but also pelagically off shore. This species grows to a length of 15 centimetres (5.9 in) SL. It is an egglayer with external fertilization, and deposits its eggs in narrow crevices. It is fished commercially for food, and also for the aquarium trade. It has been introduced to Lake Kivu.
