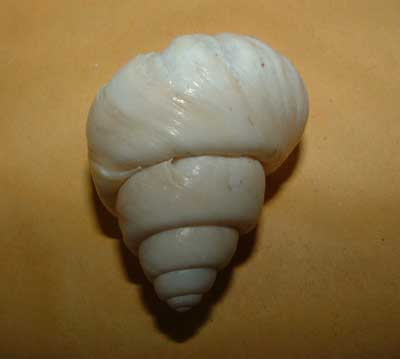
- Shell of Neothauma tanganyicense

Scientific classification
- Kingdom: Animalia
- Phylum: Mollusca
- Class: Gastropoda
- Subclass: Caenogastropoda
- Order: Architaenioglossa
- Family: Viviparidae
- Subfamily: Bellamyinae
- Genus: Neothauma; E. A. Smith, 1880

Type species
- Neothauma tanganyicense E. A. Smith, 1880

Synonyms
- Viviparus (Neothauma) E. A. Smith, 1880

= Neothauma =

Genus of gastropods

Neothauma is a genus of freshwater snail with a gill and an operculum, an aquatic gastropod mollusc in the subfamily Bellamyinae of the family Viviparidae.

== Species ==
- Neothauma jouberti Bourguignat, 1888
- † Neothauma jupadwongaensis Musalizi, 2017
- Neothauma tanganyicense E. A. Smith, 1880

Taxa inquirenda

- Neothauma bridouxianum Grandidier, 1885
- Neothauma servainianum Grandidier, 1885

Species brought into synonymy

- Neothauma bicarinatum Bourguignat, 1885: synonym of Neothauma tanganyicense var. bicarinatum Bourguignat, 1885
- Neothauma ecclesi Pain & Crowley, 1964: synonym of Bellamya ecclesi (Crowley & Pain, 1964) (original combination)
- Neothauma giraudi Bourguignat, 1885: synonym of Neothauma tanganyicense E. A. Smith, 1880 (junior synonym)

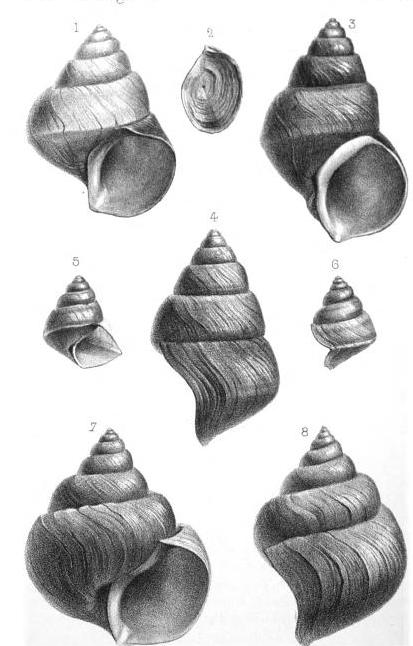
More archaic Neothauma species

== History ==
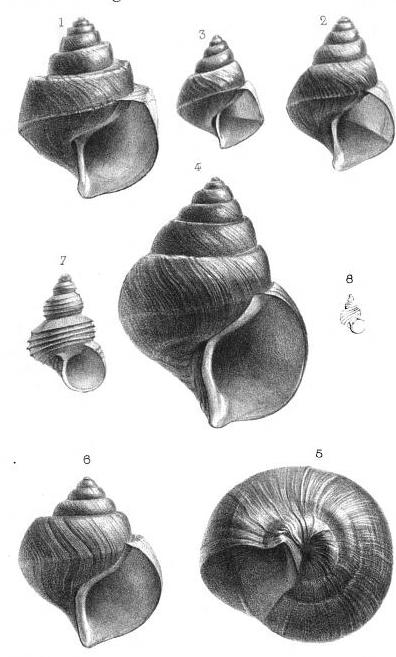
Archaic Neothauma species

The genus Neothauma previously contained several species, but most were reassigned to other genera.
