= Pierre Brichard =

Belgian explorer and collector (1921–1990)

Pierre Brichard (2 October 1921 – 1990) was a Belgian explorer and collector-exporter of African aquarium fishes, especially those of Lake Tanganyika.

== Discoveries ==
He discovered new fish species by traveling to different regions of the lake and collecting specimens with nets, traps, and diving equipment. He discovered numerous species, and several fish species are named for him.

== Scientific endeavors ==
He also photographed and documented the fishes he found and sent them to museums and scientists for identification and description.

== Publications ==
He wrote a book entitled Pierre Brichard's Book of Cichlids and All the Other Fishes of Lake Tanganyika, which is considered a classic in the field.

== Conservation and sustainability ==
He was passionate about the conservation and the study of the lake's biodiversity, and he established a research station and a fish farm on the shore of the lake. The fish farm allowed him to breed fish for export without depleting the lakes population of popular aquarium fish.

He was known as “the fairy of Burundi” for his dedication and enthusiasm.

== Taxa described by him ==
- See Category:Taxa named by Pierre Brichard

== Taxa named for him ==
- a tetra Alestopetersius brichardi
- a cichlid Chalinochromis brichardi
- Congopanchax brichardi Poll, 1971
- a barb Enteromius brichardi (Poll & J. G. Lambert, 1959)
- a blind spiny eel Mastacembelus brichardi
- a cichlid Neolamprologus brichardi
- a catfish Phyllonemus brichardi Risch, 1987
- Brichard's lampeye Poropanchax brichardi (Poll, 1971)
- a catfish Synodontis brichardi
- a cichlid Teleogramma brichardi
- a cichlid Telmatochromis brichardi
- a cichlid Tropheus brichardi
