= Max Poll =

Belgian ichthyologist

Max Fernand Leon Poll (21 July 1908 in Ruisbroek – 13 March 1991 in Uccle) was a Belgian ichthyologist who specialised in the Cichlidae. In the years 1946 and 1947 he organised an expedition to Lake Tanganyika.

He has described several species of Pseudocrenilabrinae, such as Lamprologus signatus, Steatocranus casuarius, Neolamprologus brichardi, and Neolamprologus pulcher.

He was a member of The Royal Academies for Science and the Arts of Belgium, professor at the Université libre de Bruxelles, and conservator at the Royal Museum of the Belgian Congo in Tervuren. He was an honorary member of the American Society of Ichthyologists and Herpetologists.

== Taxon named in his honor ==
Named after him are species and taxa such as:

- The African Lanternshark Etmopterus polli Bigelow, Schroeder & S. Springer, 1953,
- Merluccius polli Cadenat, 1950,
- Pollichthys Grey, 1959,
- Polyipnus polli Schultz, 1961,
- The Catfish Microsynodontis polli J. G. Lambert, 1958.
- The African Catfish Synodontis polli Gosse, 1982.
- Placidochromis polli (W. E. Burgess & H. R. Axelrod, 1973)
- The African Tetra Phenacogrammus polli J. G. Lambert, 1961.
- The bichir Polypterus polli J. P. Gosse, 1988

== Taxon described by him ==
- See Category:Taxa named by Max Poll
