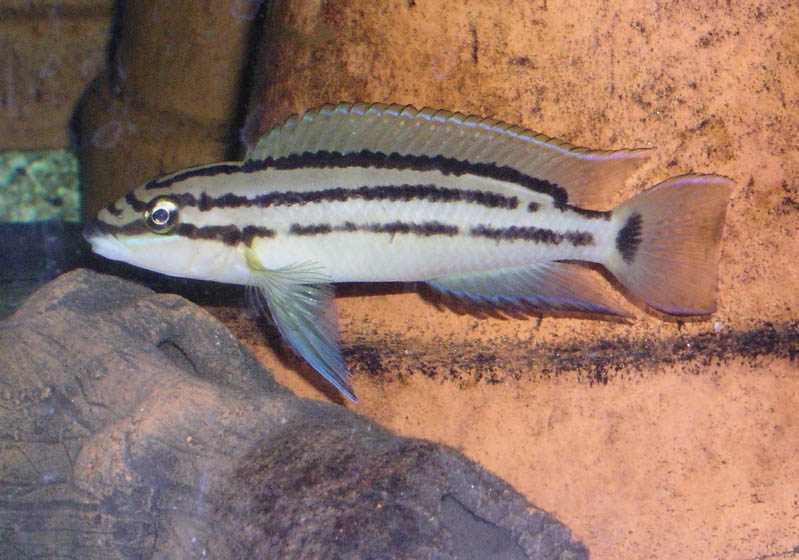
- C. popelini

Scientific classification
- Domain: Eukaryota
- Kingdom: Animalia
- Phylum: Chordata
- Class: Actinopterygii
- Order: Cichliformes
- Family: Cichlidae
- Tribe: Lamprologini
- Genus: Chalinochromis; Poll, 1974

Type species
- Chalinochromis brichardi Poll, 1974

= Chalinochromis =

Genus of fishes

Chalinochromis is a small cichlid genus from the subfamily Pseudocrenilabrinae. These ray-finned fishes are endemic to Lake Tanganyika in the East African Rift. The scientific name refers to the bridle-like markings across the heads of members of this genus. They have specialized jaws enabling them to feed on sponges.

This genus has a puzzling relationship with the extremely similar species placed in Julidochromis. In their mtDNA NADH dehydrogenase subunit 2 sequence, Chalinochromis are closer to J. dickfeldi, J. ornatus and J. transcriptus – in particular the latter two – than to any other living fish, while J. marlieri and J. regani are closer to Telmatochromis. Julidochromis thus might need to be split in two, with Chalinochromis included in one lineage. Alternatively, there has twice been successful intergeneric hybridization between particular lineages of Julidochromis males and Chalinochromis females (males generally do not pass on mtDNA to their offspring). Yet another possibility is that Julidochromis is monophyletic and includes Chalinochromis; in this scenario males of the common ancestor of J. marlieri and J. regani would have hybridized with females of the common ancestor of Telmatochromis.

Chalinochromis are popular aquarium fishes, and require similar care to Julidochromis. Like most lamprologine species, Chalinochromis are secretive during spawning, often choosing a small cave or crevice to spawn inside. In the aquarium the species often spawns under flat pieces of slate.

== Species ==
The three formally described species in this genus are as follows:

- Chalinochromis brichardi Poll, 1974
- Chalinochromis cyanophleps S. O. Kullander, Mi. Karlsson, Ma. Karlsson & Norén, 2014
- Chalinochromis popelini Brichard, 1989

The two undescribed species in this genus are as follows:

- Chalinochromis sp. "bifrenatus"
- Chalinochromis sp. "ndobhoi"
