= Lepidiolamprologus meeli =

Neolamprologus meeli

Conservation status
- Least Concern (IUCN 3.1)

Scientific classification
- Kingdom: Animalia
- Phylum: Chordata
- Class: Actinopterygii
- Order: Cichliformes
- Family: Cichlidae
- Genus: Lepidiolamprologus
- Species: L. meeli

Binomial name
- Lepidiolamprologus meeli (Poll, 1948)

Synonyms
- Lamprologus meeli Poll, 1948; Neolamprologus meeli (Poll, 1948)

Species of fish

Lepidiolamprologus meeli is a cichlid species in the subfamily Pseudocrenilabrinae. It is endemic to Lake Tanganyika, where it is found in the waters of Burundi, the Democratic Republic of the Congo, Tanzania, and Zambia.

It is sometimes placed in Neolamprologus, and this may well be appropriate. As it seems, it belongs to a group also including N. boulengeri and L. hecqui, L. attenuatus and L. kendalli.

== Etymology ==
This cichlid is named in honor of botanist Ludo van Meel (1908–1990), a member of the Belgian Hydrobiological Mission to Lake Tanganyika that took place between 1946 and 1947, during which the type specimen was collected.

== Hybrids ==
As hybridization seems to have played a major role in the radiation of this group, the exact relationships of the present species are obscure; one specimens was found to belong to an mtDNA lineage quite similar to L./N. hecqui, while another was distantly similar to L. kendalli in this regard. Perhaps the former observation is based on a misidentified specimen; in any case it appears that a somewhat closer relationship between the present species and L. kendalli than of either to any other lamprologine is more likely than not. Yet as this observation is only based on analysis of mtDNA sequence data, it may just as well be that the first L./N. meeli were the hybrid offspring of a Lepidiolamprologus female ancestral to L. kendalli and a Neolamprologus male, with subsequent hybridization of L./N. meeli and L./N. hecqui.
