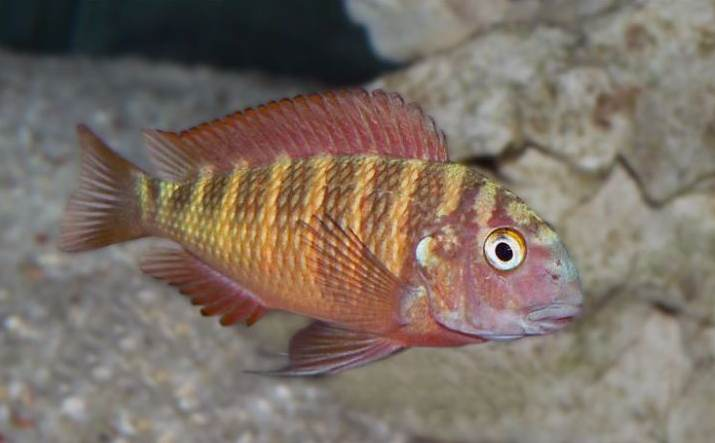
- Tropheus moorii "Chimba"

Conservation status
- Near Threatened (IUCN 3.1)

Scientific classification
- Kingdom: Animalia
- Phylum: Chordata
- Class: Actinopterygii
- Division: Teleostei
- Order: Cichliformes
- Family: Cichlidae
- Genus: Tropheus
- Species: T. moorii

Binomial name
- Tropheus moorii Boulenger, 1898

Synonyms
- Tropheus moorii moorii Boulenger, 1898

= Tropheus moorii =

Blunthead cichlid

Species of fish

Tropheus moorii, the blunthead cichlid, is a species of cichlid endemic to Lake Tanganyika in Africa. Over 40 different color morphs of this species are dispersed throughout the lake, ranging from dark green to flame red and yellow. They mostly feed on filamentous algae on the rocky shallows they inhabit. T. moorii is a maternal mouthbrooder, so eggs are fertilized and young are carried in the mouth of the female while they hatch and develop.

== Territorialism ==
Both male and female adults occupy individual feeding territories. Blunthead cichlids inhabiting territories at greater depth tend to have smaller adult body sizes and larger territories compared to those in shallows. Males have larger territories than females. A female leaves her territory to pair with a male and usually visits several territories multiple times before choosing a male. After the male and female form a pair bond, the female forages in his territory up to three weeks under his protection before spawning. A female's ovaries do not fully mature until she pairs with a male and feeds from his territory. After spawning, the female leaves the male's territory to occupy a small unclaimed area for the mouthbrooding period. In contrast to the frequent movement of females, a male usually remains in his territory for months even if he is never visited by females.

=== Interspecies interactions ===
Often, blunthead cichlid feeding territories are adjacent to territories of conspecific and heterospecific neighbors. A male T. moorii usually courts a female conspecific, which visits his feeding territory.

In Lake Tanganyika, blunthead cichlids coexist with other herbivorous cichlids P. trewavasae, P. orthognathus, P. polyodon, and T. temporalis. T. moorii, P. polyodon, and T. temporalis individuals are not aggressive towards one another, but are aggressive towards individuals of other species and conspecifics. Although their territories often overlap, individuals of the three species do not usually interact due to the dietary differences that exist. For example, P. polyodon and P. trewavasae mostly feed on unicellular algae rather than filamentous algae.

Having overlapping territories with P. polyodon may benefit T. moorii individuals since P. polyodon removes silt from the rock surface as they feed. This allows T. moorii to easily scrape filamentous algae from the rocks. Having overlapping territories with P. trewavasae may benefit T. moorii individuals because both defend their territory from much larger P. orthognathus individuals. They also are able to drive them away, whereas an individual blunthead cichlid may not be able to defend territory successfully. This is an example of commensalism rather than mutualism because individuals would defend their territories regardless.

=== Size-dependent dominance hierarchies ===
T. moorii participates in size-dependent dominance hierarchies when defending territory from intruders. If an individual intrudes on a T. moorii territory, the interaction may be a one-sided (territory owner towards the intruder) attack, one-sided display (spread and quiver fins/tail to intimidate), mutual attack, or mutual displays. These usually occur at or near the borders of the territories. In a one-sided attack, the territory owner chases the intruder until it leaves the territory.

Interactions vary depending on the relative size of the territory owner and intruder. Individuals tend to perform one-sided attacks on neighbors smaller than them and perform one-sided displays towards those larger than them. Attacks may occur inside or outside the feeding territory of the territory owner, while displays usually take place within the territory. Displays are very rare when a large difference in body size (more than 2.5 cm)exists, and more common when the difference is smaller (less than 2 cm). Mutual attacks are very likely to occur when the individuals are of similar size. Neighbors (having an adjacent territory) are more likely to respond to an attack with a display compared to a non-neighbor. In observed interactions between specifically P. orthognathus and T. moorii individuals with adjacent territories, the larger fish attacked the smaller one regardless of species, and no displays occurred.

== Mating and reproduction ==
The mating system of T. moorii is serial monogamy. A male and female establish a temporary monogamous pair bond and spawn. The female mouthbroods the eggs and young with no direct assistance from the male, so after spawning, the male is free to pair bond with other females. T. moorii broods show genetic monogamy, with all eggs having been fertilized by a single male. Other cichlid species that exhibit similar social monogamy in mating, such as V. moorii, do not always show genetic monogamy due to parasitic spawning (males fertilizing eggs of a female paired to another male). Spawning occurs on a rock surface, with the female laying up to 20 eggs which are bright orange in color. Eggs are incubated for 30 to 35 days, and when the young emerge from their mother's mouth, they are advanced enough in their physical development to live like adults.

=== Buccal feeding ===
Buccal feeding refers to the feeding a mouthbrooding mother does to feed her young located in her buccal cavity. T. moorii females have unusually high parental investment in their offspring since they produce large eggs and buccally feed their young. Among cichlids, T. moorii has a very high egg to adult body size ratio. In the early stages of mouthbrooding, a female rarely feeds, but after the eggs hatch, she begins feeding to nourish them. The mother effectively starves herself during the mouthbrooding period, since all nourishment she takes in goes to feed the young. The yolk sacs of the eggs are depleted around the 25th day of mouthbrooding, but the offspring are not released for several more days, so in that time, all of their nourishment must come from buccal feeding. Buccal feeding is costly in terms of energy for the female since it requires more swimming. Buccal feeding does not shorten the mouthbrooding period; instead, young that are fed buccally are larger, heavier, and faster than unfed young. These benefits are very advantageous to the young since they lower their predation risk and size is usually the determining factor in conflicts over resources.

=== Sexual selection and color morphs ===
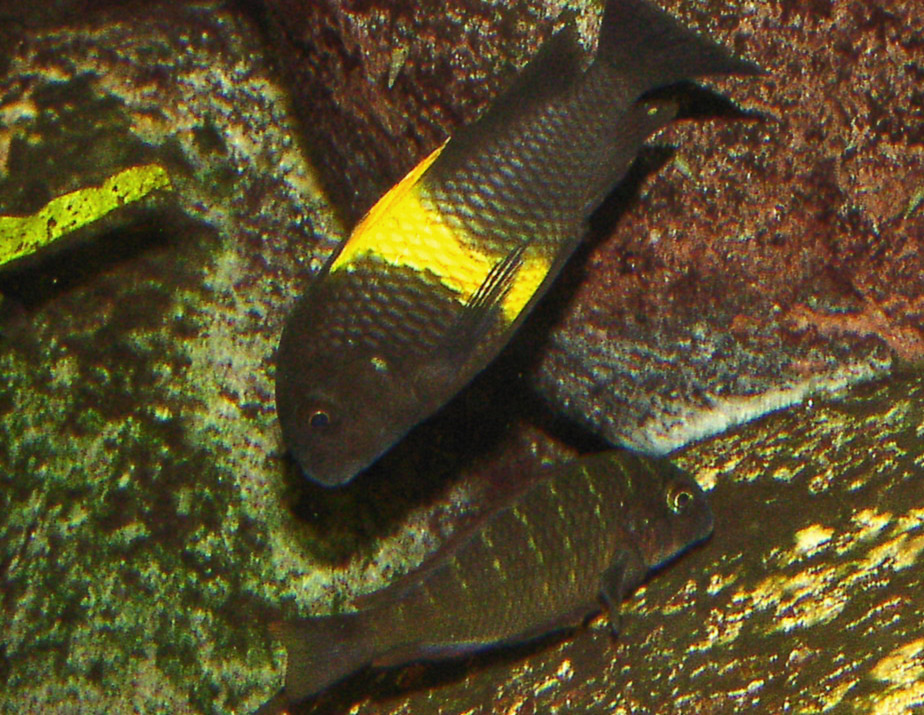
Two of the many variants currently included in T. moorii: "Kiriza" above and "Kachese" below. The former is part of a group informally known as T. sp. "Black" (also including "Bemba", "Bulu Point", "Lueba" and others), which may represent a separate species

Since male blunthead cichlids provide no brood care or other parental investment after spawning, the operational sex ratio in a population is strongly biased towards males. A male's reproductive success varies based on how many times he can mate during his life. Females, by discriminating between males to decide a mate, strongly influence male reproductive success. Experimentally, females have been shown to share preferences for the same males when given two to choose from, meaning some males get to reproduce more often than others.

T. moorii shows very great diversity in color morphs, and color morph is a typical target for mate choice sexual selection. A female is more likely to choose a mate that has the same morph she does and this is probably what drove the proliferation and maintenance of the many color morphs. T. moorii individuals of a particular color morph are usually found in the same geographic area, so color morphs are also maintained by the relative isolation of T. moorii populations. There is a level of genetic differences between some populations, and it is possible that these (notably the so-called Tropheus sp. "Black" and Tropheus sp. "Mpimbwe") represent separate species.

== Sexual differences ==
As a sexually monomorphic species, T. moorii can be quite challenging to sex. The upper lip of males is more prominent (i.e., larger) than that of females. Males' lips on average tend to be more off-white, as well, due to their constant lip-locking aggression. Furthermore, males tend to have a turned-up nose, while females tend to have a greater slope and rounded nose, making the shape of their heads ellipsoid. Males generally grow at a faster rate and display their adult colors sooner. Males' coloration is also often more bold than females' because they display when courting females. Adult males also tend to have a deeper body, whereas females appear more slim and streamlined.

== Feeding and habitat ==
T. moorii is strictly herbivorous like all Tropheus species. They spend the majority of their time scraping algae from the rocks. In the wild, blunthead cichlids are found in shallow bays and in the upper reaches of the lake over rocky reefs where the water is quite illuminated, because this is where the algae and other vegetable matter grow most thickly. Consequently, they are adapted to bright light.

== Etymology ==
The specific name honours the discoverer of this species, John Edmund Sharrock Moore (1870–1947).
