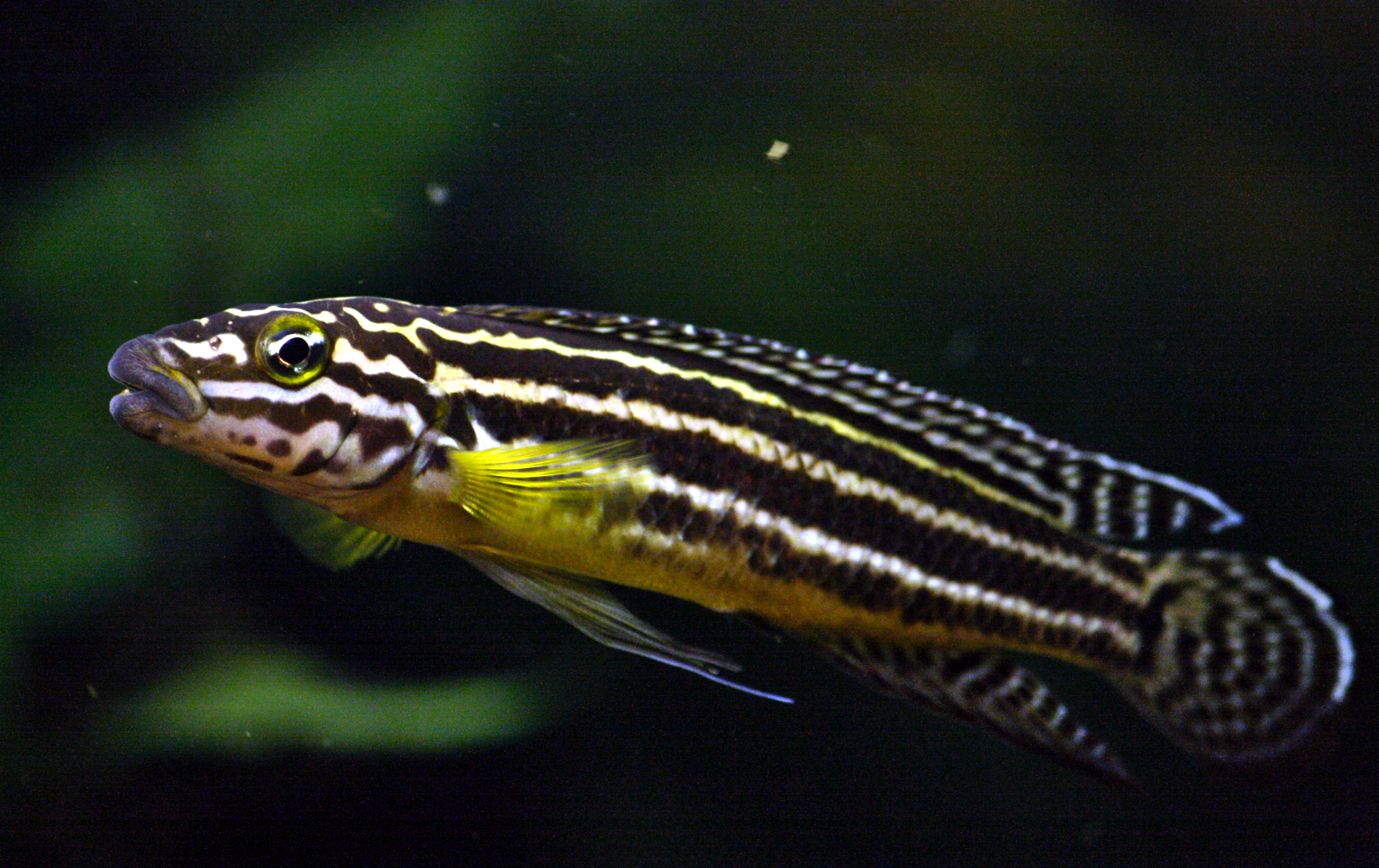
- Adult

Conservation status
- Least Concern (IUCN 3.1)

Scientific classification
- Kingdom: Animalia
- Phylum: Chordata
- Class: Actinopterygii
- Order: Cichliformes
- Family: Cichlidae
- Genus: Julidochromis
- Species: J. regani

Binomial name
- Julidochromis regani Poll, 1942

= Convict julie =

Species of fish

The convict julie (Julidochromis regani) is a cichlid species in the subfamily Pseudocrenilabrinae family endemic to Lake Tanganyika. Hence it is found in Burundi, the Democratic Republic of the Congo, Tanzania, and Zambia. The fish is named after Charles Tate Regan.

This species is closely related to Julidochromis marlieri. Possibly, a male common ancestor of these two hybridised with some female Telmatochromis ancestor in their evolutionary past.

== Description ==
Julidochromis regani is a small (up to 13 centimetres (5.1 in) TL) ray-finned fish. Its pale to golden yellow body is slender and elongated. A varying black stripe pattern, depending on which part of the lake the fish originates from, is present. However, Julidochromis regani all have four slender lateral black stripes that run the length of the body, although some variations have the fourth stripe exclusively on the head. On the dorsal fin the stripes are vertical. The outer edge of the caudal, dorsal and anal fins is white, while the pectoral fins are yellow.

Sexing is difficult, but males do have a small genital papilla and females are generally plumper than the male.

== Ecology ==
It is omnivorous. Pairs are largely monogamous, though instances of polyandry, with the female taking more than one mate, have been recorded in both the wild and the aquarium. It is a secretive biparental substrate spawner, retreating to caves or rock crevices for protection and breeding.

== In the aquarium ==
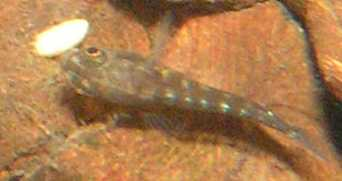
Convict julie fry and egg

Julidochromis regani are small-growing dwarf cichlids and easy to spawn and care for if their basic needs are fulfilled. Like all Lake Tanganyika cichlids, Julidochromis regani are best maintained in hard alkaline water, with a pH of 8.5 - 9.0 and a hardness of 12-14 kH, and in aquaria no smaller than 60–80 litres (16–21 US gal). Only one species of Julidochromis should be kept in any single aquarium, as the species within this genus tend to hybridise easily. Hybridisation with Chalinochromis (which might belong in Julidochromis) and Telmatochromis is suspected, and it is common enough in Lamprologini to better avoid keeping more than one species of this tribe per aquarium. The tank should be decorated with rocks to form caves and passageways as shelter; like many other Rift Valley cichlids, they tend to be territorial and somewhat aggressive. It is therefore best to keep them with other cichlids to defuse their rowdy behavior.

Fry can stay with the parents and should be fed protein-rich foods such as baby brine shrimp. Parents can sometimes be found leading their fry around the aquarium. Breeding is, as usual in these social and intelligent fishes, easiest achieved by acquiring a stock of juveniles and letting them grow up together until pair-bonds are established.
