= Polyandry in fish =

Fish mating phenomenon

Polyandry in fishes is a mating system where females mate with multiple males within one mating season. This type of mating exists in a variety of animal species. Polyandry has been found in both oviparous and viviparous bony fishes and sharks. General examples of polyandry occur in fish species, such as green swordtails and Trinidadian guppies. Specific types of polyandry have also been classified, such as classical polyandry in pipefish cooperative polyandry in cichlids and convenience polyandry in sharks.

== Examples ==
Poeciliids are freshwater live-bearing fish and internal fertilizers that are able to store sperm for months, setting the stage for sperm competition and allowing female cryptic sperm choice. These Poeciliid species include green swordtails, Xiphophorus helleri and Trinidadian guppies, Poecilia reticulata. When females mate promiscuously and copulate with multiple males, the interests of the sexes may differ, leading to sexual conflict. These conflicts include mating and fertilization frequency, parental efforts, and power struggles between male and female dominance.

The Trinidadian guppy, Poecilia reticulata has a resource-free mating system, meaning males do not provide during mating or defend their territories against other males. Guppies demonstrate one of the highest levels of female multiple mating in the fish species. Females tend to copulate with multiple males to ensure that males with strongly competitive sperm have increased paternity rates. Females who engage in polyandry obtain certain advantages such as shorter gestation times, larger broods, and the production of offspring with better phenotypes and abilities. Females prefer phenotypically bright colored males that are usually orange, red, yellow, or blue. Male offspring from polyandrous mating tend to be more colorful than offspring from monogamous mating, which contain more black spots rather than multiple colors. Brightly colored males tend to display stronger sigmoidal displays, correlating sperm production rate with courtship intensity and body size. Offspring were more phenotypically diverse than their parents, suggesting a diversified selection that allows offspring to cope better with the environment and have variability in mating. However, there are also costs associated with polyandry. Placental fish Heterandria formosa offspring from females who mate with multiple males, have a longer maturation time, leading to potentially higher levels of fatality in slower developing offspring.

== Classical polyandry ==
Classical polyandry occurs when the evolution of sex role reversal has occurred and a female copulates with multiple males. These males raise their own progeny without any help from females. This mating system is hypothesized to occur in three steps. The first step, which is an important prerequisite step in classical polyandry, involves the evolution of male care for eggs. In the second step, females have the ability to produce more clutches than a male can handle, leading to an increase in female fecundity because these females need to find other males to mate with for the remaining eggs they produced. The third step occurs as females compete to lay a clutch into a nest for the next male while the original male is caring for the initial clutch. More successful females tend to produce greater amounts of offspring.

Male pregnancy is a common feature in the family Syngnathidae, which includes pipefish, seahorses, and sea dragons. This type of polyandry has been demonstrated by analyzing the genetic composition of Gulf pipefish, Sygnathus scovelli and straightnose pipefish, Nerophis ophidion, which shows that males only mate once during their pregnancy, whereas females mate multiple times. This extreme form of polyandry indicates that this species has a much stronger intensity of sexual selection on females than on males, in which females tend to be larger and more adorned than males. Evidence for stronger sexual selection in females in Gulf pipefish, Syngnathus scovelli, include having secondary sexual characteristics, such as longer abdomens and stripes that are not found in males. Males are usually capable of combining uniparental care with defending their territories or nest, attracting females for copulation.

Some species of male pipefish have a fully or partially enclosed pouch where females deposit eggs. Males then fertilize and carry the offspring in or on his body until the offspring hatch. The pipefish species, Syngnathus typhle males can only carry approximately half of the brood produced by a larger female. This male limitation allows females to increase their fitness by developing eggs for multiple males. These females can then mate with multiple males, which leads to increased female fecundity and supports the second step of the evolution of classical polyandry.

== Cooperative polyandry ==
Cooperative polyandry occurs when inferior males potentially share paternity and offspring care with a dominant male. This type of polyandry occurs in eight fish species, including cichlids. Females can potentially direct the paternity of dominant, or alpha males and subordinate, or beta males by techniques such as cryptic female choice and sneaky copulation with subordinate males. Although dominant males potentially provide alleles which code for superior phenotypic traits, females also choose to mate with subordinate males because they provide more brood care than the larger dominant males. Subordinate males, or nest-helpers, can gain benefits from protecting the clutch such as food, protection, and successful paternity.

Multiple explanations have been hypothesized to explain the evolution of cooperative polyandry. These hypotheses include kin selection, pay-to-stay, signals of prestige, and group augmentation. Kin selection occurs when individuals help their offspring to increase their inclusive fitness, which includes aid in defending their territory and being related to females. Evidence suggests that helpers in the cichlid species, Neolamprologus pulcher, tend to have preferential treatment for their kin over other males' kin. Pay-to-stay occurs when beta males help alpha males and females in order to be allowed to stay in the nesting site. Also, beta males will continue to help the nest even when a new alpha male takes over the site to avoid being evicted. However, this hypothesis has not yet been supported due to a lack of observation regarding alpha males punishing beta males for not caring for the offspring. Signals of prestige include higher quality males being able to demonstrate stronger advertising techniques than lower quality males to increase their paternity rate. However, there is currently very little evidence supporting this hypothesis, especially in cichlids, where size has been found to determine the hierarchies. The group augmentation hypothesis states that cooperative mating systems are favored when it enhances group size and reproductive fitness. More research still needs to be conducted to determine whether or not group augmentation is beneficial in cooperative mating systems.

Cooperative polyandry occurs in the cichlid species, Chalinochromis brichardi and Julidochromis transcriptus from Lake Tanganyika and the Neolamprologus pulcher. The cooperatively breeding cichlids tend to exhibit a size order of the alpha male being the largest, followed by the female, and the beta males being the smallest of the group. However, in some cases, females can be the largest, followed by the alpha male, and then beta males.

Females can use their body size and wedge-shaped crests as copulation sites to direct male paternity when both alpha and beta males are present. Larger females have the ability to dominate all males and can choose which males to mate with externally. Smaller females are usually dominated by the alpha male, which can sometimes lead to a monogamous mating system between the alpha male and female. Sexual conflict occurs when females choose to mate with beta males over the alpha male because the alpha male's paternity is lowered. The subordinate males can conceal themselves from the dominant male inside the crevices to avoid conflict with the alpha male. Females can spawn eggs in deeper crests, allowing beta males to fertilize some of the clutch without being harassed by the alpha male. However, when only one type of male was present, females did not choose to mate in wedge-shaped crevices. This demonstrates that females might use the crevices as a strategy to attract both alpha and beta males to the nest.

Females can induce the paternity allotment of her potential mates by choosing where she deposits her eggs within her nesting site. Female brood location choice can intercede the effects of sexual conflict over group membership because it allows multiple males to protect each clutch, rather than having these males compete for their own clutch to mate with females. Even though some cichlid species display cooperative polyandry in crevices, other cichlid species are mouth brooders, where females carry eggs in their mouths that have been fertilized by multiple males. Typically, a maximum of six males can fertilize a single clutch of cichlid offspring.

== Convenience polyandry ==
Convenience polyandry occurs when females mate with multiple males to avoid coercive breeding harassment from these males. This type of polyandry was found throughout a variety of elasmobranch fish, or cartilaginous fish, such as sharks. These sharks included lemon sharks, sandbar sharks, nurse sharks and catsharks. For convenience polyandry to occur, the costs of females resisting males must outweigh the costs of mating. Females tend to get injured by males during copulation because males bite onto their pectoral fins and bodies while mating. Females can also receive cloacal injuries caused by the male's sexual organ. Strong evidence for female indirect benefits has not yet been determined, suggesting one reason for convenience polyandry. Since there do not seem to be any direct benefits for females, polyandry could be driven for male benefits. Males can force females into multiple mating to maximize their reproductive success. In addition to being a form of coercive breeding, males usually work together in cooperative breeding to force females to mate with them. Sexual dimorphism in mouth and dental morphology has been shown in males. These males develop long, narrow mouths and longer teeth that aid in biting female pectoral fins during mating.

Some shark species, such as catsharks, Scyliorbinus carnicula, exhibit a different form of convenience polyandry. These sharks fertilize internally, but then lay their fertilized eggs onto algae or rocky surfaces. Catsharks tend to have a prolonged mating season, allowing females to store sperm and lay eggs hundreds of days after copulation from multiple males, displaying a high frequency of multiple paternity within a single clutch.

Several viviparous shark species, where females give birth to live offspring that develop internally within the mother, also engage in polyandry. In viviparous mating, a direct transfer of nutrients from mother to embryo through a yolk sac placenta occurs. Litters sired by multiple fathers have been determined in lemon sharks, Negaprion brevirostris, nurse sharks, Ginlymostoma cirratum, sandbar sharks, Carcharhinus plumbeus, and squaloid sharks, such as spiny dogfish, Squalus acanthias. Some male sharks can also mate multiple times with these females, which is referred to as a polygynandry mating system.

Overall, polyandry is the dominant mating system in lemon sharks and sandbar sharks. However, geography can play a role in mating systems. For example, western north Atlantic sandbar sharks exhibit polyandry as the dominant mating system whereas in the Central Pacific, sandbar sharks do not have a dominant polyandry mating system. In addition to polyandry, lemon sharks are one of the shark species that engage in philopatry, or the practice of females returning to sites where they have given birth to previous offspring. Females were found to have stronger loyalties to philopatry than males. These sharks gather together at specific mating sites, allowing females to mate with multiple males in one area. Selecting specific nursery sites influence adult fitness, recruitment, and provide a protected area for live offspring to develop.

However, one consequence that may arise is increased levels of inbreeding within the nursing sites. Another consequence includes coercive mating by males, which can force females into polyandrous mating even if they do not receive any benefits from this mating system. Copulation requires a substantial amount of energy and females that mate with multiple males causes a negative effect on their overall fitness. Female lemon sharks give birth to four to eighteen pups every two years. This two-year reproductive cycle usually occurs in lemon sharks, sandbar sharks, and nurse sharks. One hypothesis states that females can engage in polyandry to find genetically dissimilar and therefore compatible males to produce high quality offspring. However, no concrete evidence has been found to strongly support this hypothesis. Further research needs to be conducted to determine whether any direct or indirect benefits exist for elasmobranch sharks.

== See also ==
- Polyandry in nature
