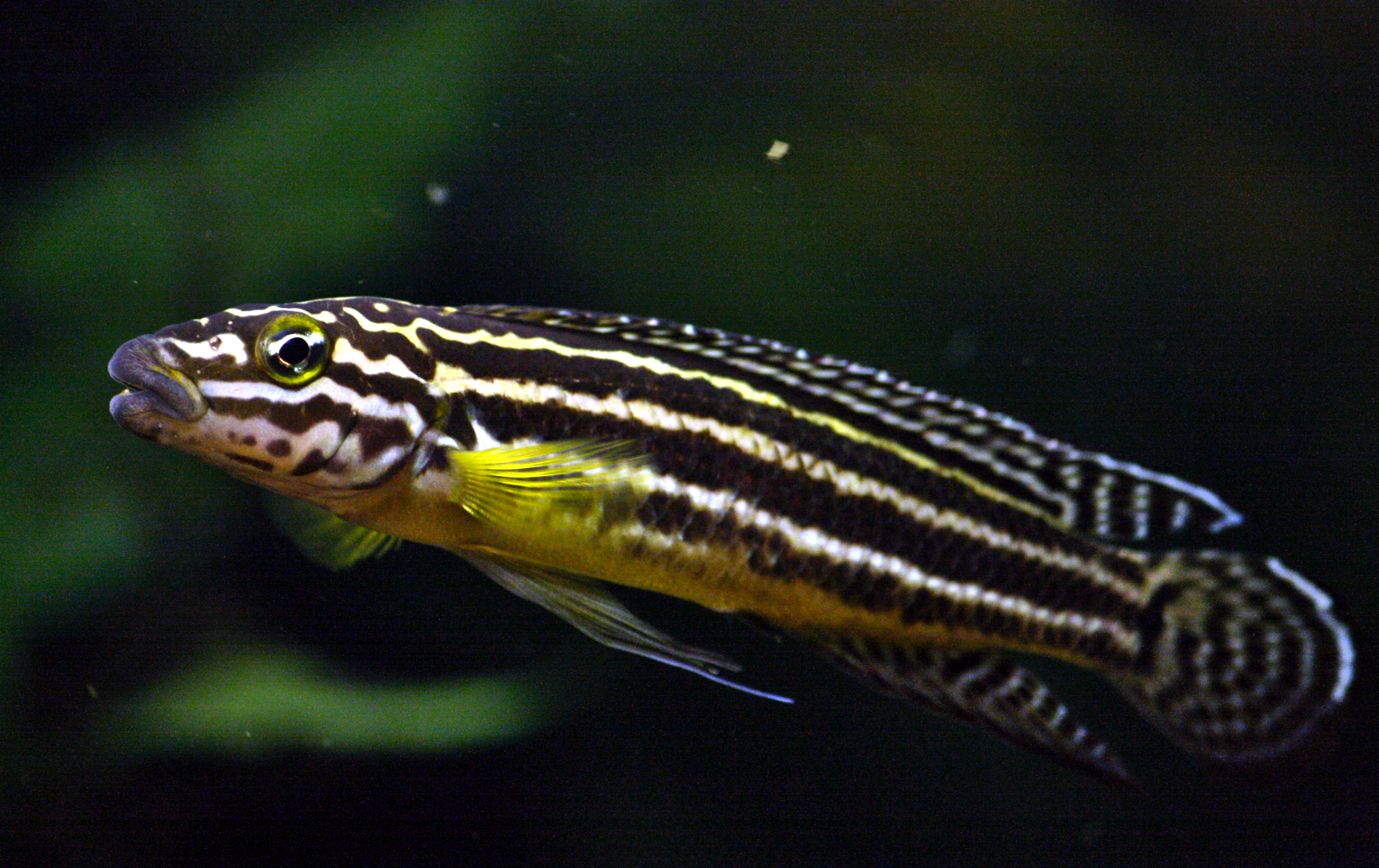
- Julidochromis regani

Scientific classification
- Kingdom: Animalia
- Phylum: Chordata
- Class: Actinopterygii
- Division: Teleostei
- Order: Cichliformes
- Family: Cichlidae
- Tribe: Lamprologini
- Genus: Julidochromis; Boulenger, 1898

Type species
- Julidochromis ornatus Boulenger, 1898

= Julidochromis =

Genus of fishes

Julidochromis is a genus of cichlids in the subfamily Pseudocrenilabrinae. They are commonly called julies and are endemic to Lake Tanganyika in eastern Africa. This genus includes six formally described species, some with a number local variants of uncertain taxonomic status. Further taxonomic work is required to determine how many species exist; the closely related Chalinochromis with two more species is sometimes included here and this may be correct. Hybridization makes attempts to determine relationships with molecular phylogenetic methods difficult.

These ray-finned fish are smallish to mid-sized (about 7–15 centimetres or 2.8–5.9 inches) and have a yellowish background colour with black lengthwise stripes or a checkerboard pattern.

== Species ==
There are currently 6 formally described species in this genus:

- Julidochromis dickfeldi Staeck, 1975
- Julidochromis marksmithi W. E. Burgess, 2014
- Julidochromis marlieri Poll, 1956
- Julidochromis ornatus Boulenger, 1898 (Golden julie)
- Julidochromis regani Poll, 1942 (Convict julie)
- Julidochromis transcriptus Matthes, 1959 (Masked julie)
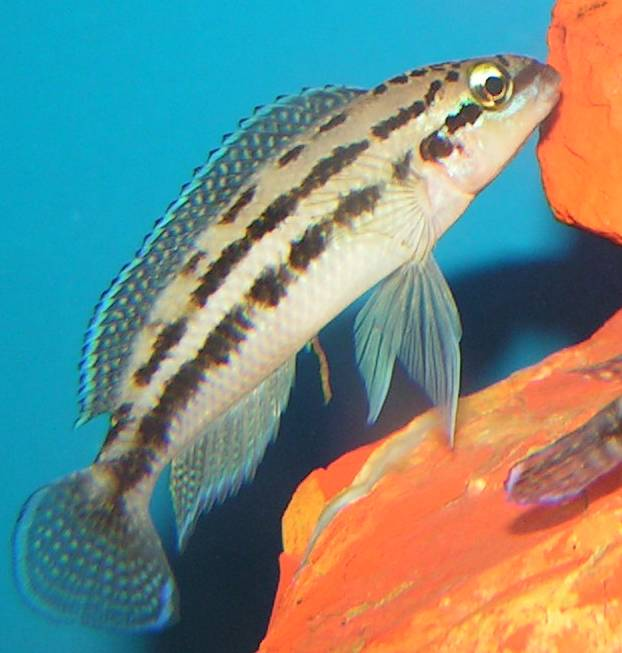
Julidochromis dickfeldi

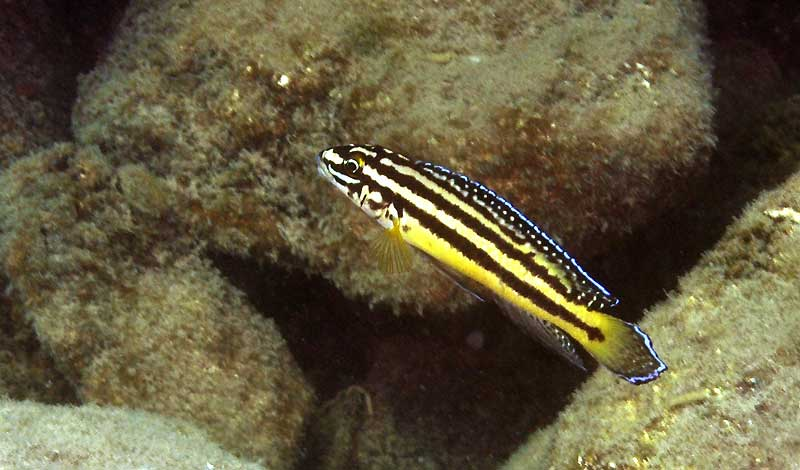
Julidochromis marksmithi

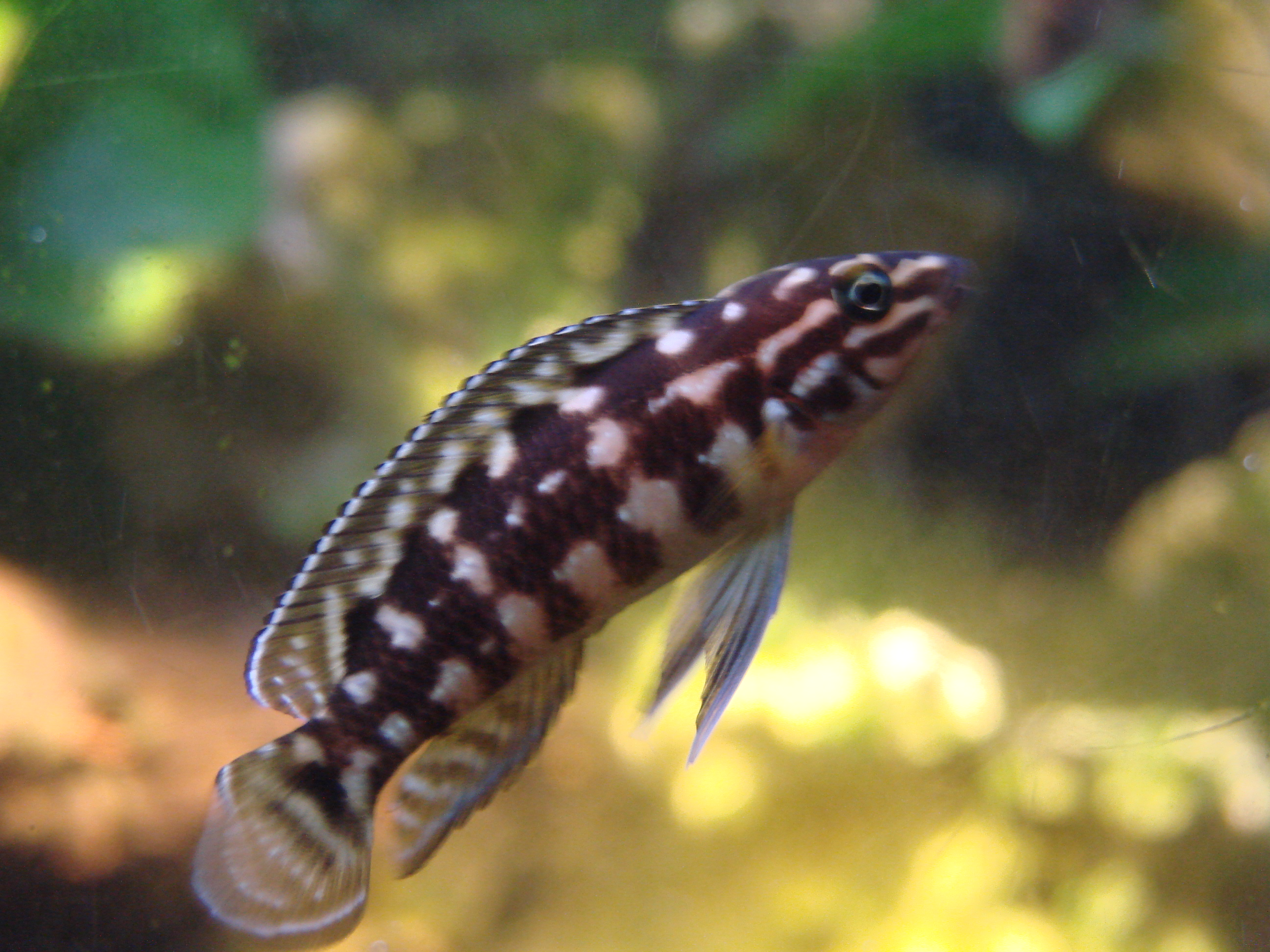
Julidochromis marlieri

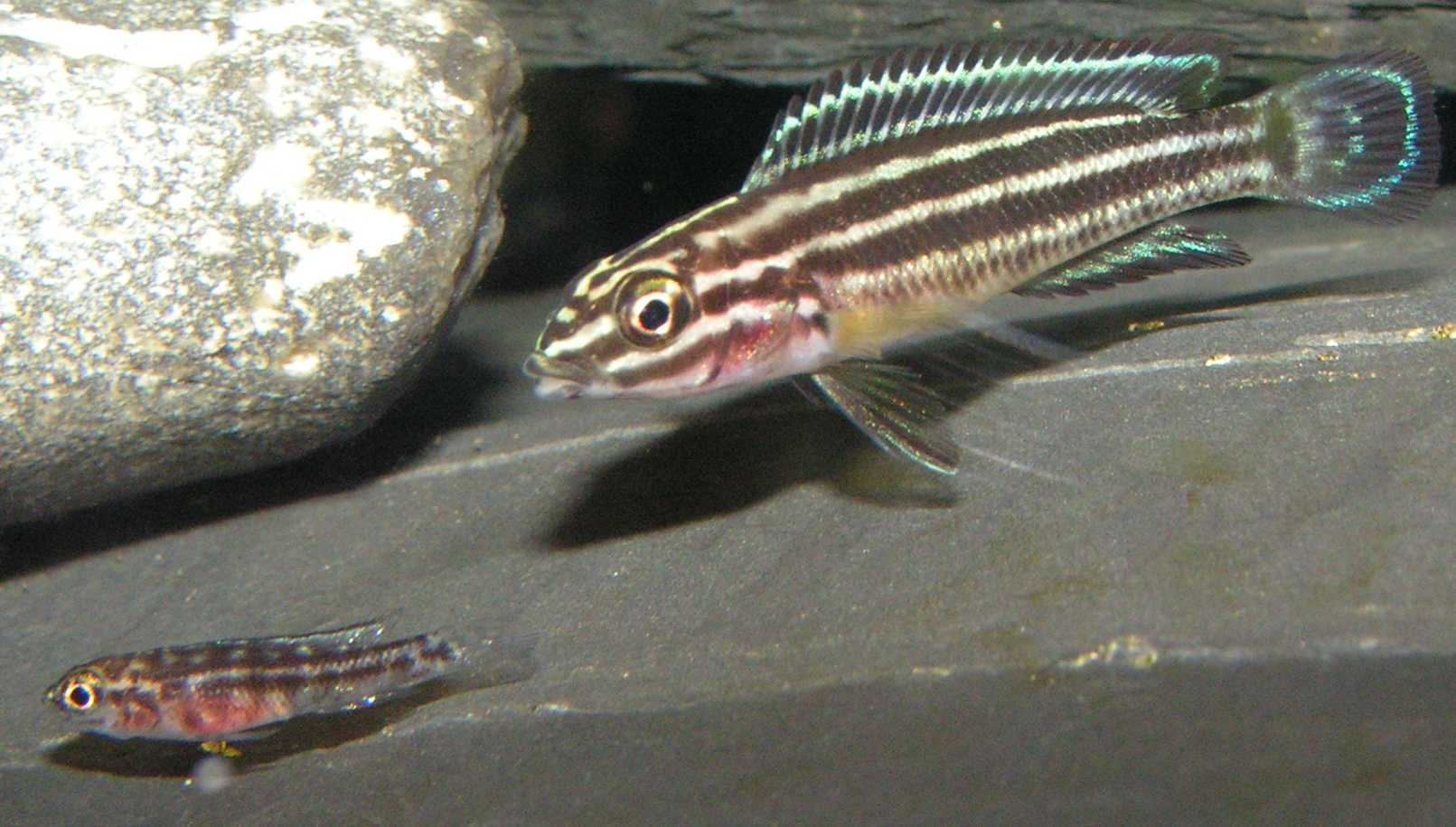
Julidochromis regani female and young

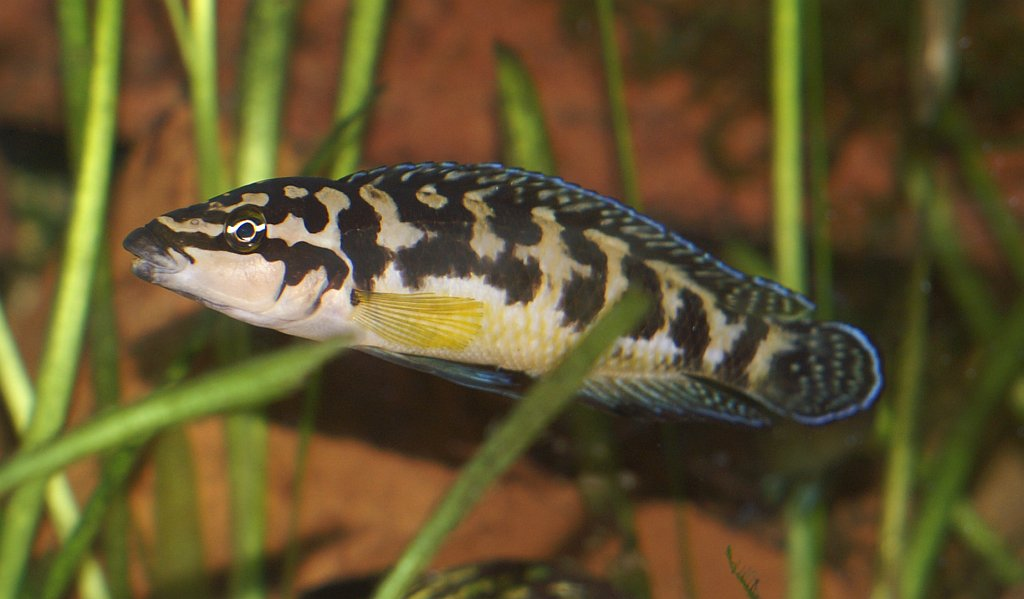
Julidochromis transcriptus

== Systematics ==
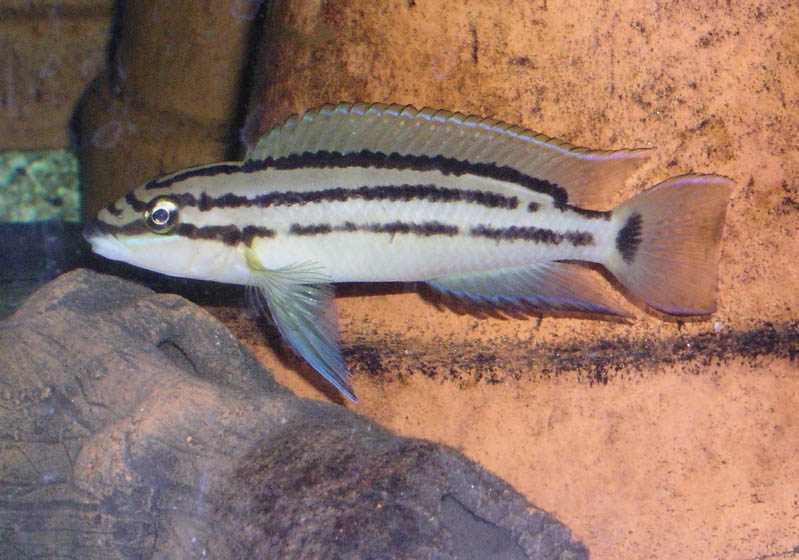
Chalinochromis popelini might belong in Julidochromis too

The relationships and systematics of Julidochromis are hard to resolve with certainty. Chalinochromis is essentially similar to these fishes except for some adaptations for feeding on sponges. In their mtDNA NADH dehydrogenase subunit 2 sequence, Chalinochromis are closer to J. dickfeldi, the Golden Julie (J. ornatus) and the Masked Julie (J. transcriptus) – in particular the latter two – than to any other living fish, while J. marlieri and the Convict Julie (J. regani) are closer to Telmatochromis. Julidochromis thus might need to be split in two, with Chalinochromis included in one lineage. Alternatively, there has twice been successful intergeneric hybridization between particular lineages of Julidochromis males and Chalinochromis females (males generally do not pass on mtDNA to their offspring), the julies being closer to Telmatochromis in this case. Yet another possibility is that Julidochromis is monophyletic and includes Chalinochromis; in this scenario males of the common ancestor of J. marlieri and J. regani would have hybridized with females of the common ancestor of Telmatochromis.

Julidochromis species are poorly studied and a number of as yet unnamed species may exist.

== Ecology and reproduction ==
Julidochromis species are secretive biparental substrate spawners, retreating to caves or rock crevices. Pairs are largely monogamous, however the largest male may maintain harems (polygyny) and the largest females may mate with multiple males at multiple nesting sites (polyandry). This has been recorded in both the wild and the aquarium.

If a pair-bond is broken, the larger fish will drive the smaller fish out of the territory, sometimes killing him in the process. In some species in this genus, such as Julidochromis marlieri, females are substantially larger than the males, and a female Julidochromis will often dominate a male larger than herself.

Julidochromis species have two spawning rhythms. Sometimes they deposit a large number of eggs (up to several hundred) every four to six weeks. Other times they spawn sequentially, laying a small number of eggs every few days. Sequential spawning results in there being fry of different ages living together in the same nest.

They prefer to lay their eggs in caves or other crevices. After spawning, both parents tend the eggs by mouthing them to rid of algae and fanning them to increase oxygen flow. The majority of parental care is done by the smaller fish in a pair, but this has been found to be influenced by the degree of size difference within a pair.

A pair of breeding fish must guard their nest from other cichlids trying to eat their offspring. Common intruders in the lake include Tropheus, Simochromis, and Petrochromis.

== Julidochromis in the aquarium ==
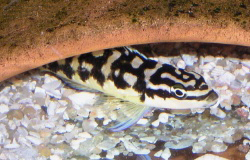
A young male Julidochromis transcriptus from Gombe Island in the aquarium

Julidochromis are small-growing dwarf cichlids and easy to spawn and care for if their basic needs are fulfilled. Like all Lake Tanganyika cichlids, they are best maintained in hard alkaline water, with a pH of 8.5–9.0 and a hardness of 12–14 kH, and in aquaria no smaller than 60–80 litres (13–18 imp gal; 16–21 US gal). Only one species of Julidochromis should be kept in any single aquarium, as the species within this genus tend to hybridise easily. As noted above, hybridisation with Chalinochromis and/or Telmatochromis is suspected, and it is common enough in Lamprologini to better avoid keeping more than one species of this tribe per aquarium.

The tank should be decorated with rocks to form caves and passageways as shelter; like many other Rift Valley cichlids they tend to be territorial and somewhat aggressive. However, Julidochromis can be shy in the aquarium and the use of dither fish may reduce their tendency to remain hidden. Despite this, like many Rift Lake cichlids they can be aggressive. It is therefore best to keep them not with general tropical fish, but with other cichlids.

As noted above, Julidochromis species are monogamous, but pair bonds can break and hostilities may result in the death of one of the pair, generally the smaller fish. If a pair does split in an aquarium it is often best to separate the pair. Fry can be maintained with the parents and should be fed protein-rich foods such as baby brine shrimp. Parents can sometimes be found leading their fry around the aquarium.
