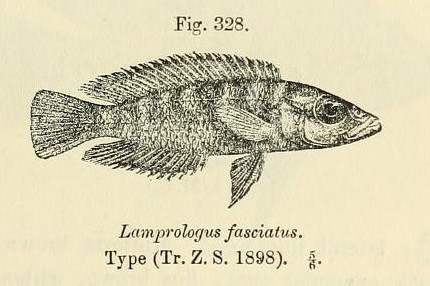

Conservation status
- Least Concern (IUCN 3.1)

Scientific classification
- Kingdom: Animalia
- Phylum: Chordata
- Class: Actinopterygii
- Order: Cichliformes
- Family: Cichlidae
- Genus: Altolamprologus
- Species: A. fasciatus

Binomial name
- Altolamprologus fasciatus (Boulenger, 1898)

Synonyms
- Lamprologus fasciatus Boulenger, 1898; Neolamprologus fasciatus (Boulenger, 1898)

= Altolamprologus fasciatus =

Species of fish

Altolamprologus fasciatus is a species of cichlid endemic to Lake Tanganyika. This species spawns in empty snail shells. This species can reach a length of 15 centimetres (5.9 in) TL. This species can also be found in the aquarium trade. They are piscivores and their prey includes the cichlid fish Variabilichromis moorii.

This species is often placed in Neolamprologus. With its torpedo-like shape, is more similar to these than to the high-backed Altolamprologus. But in other respects it is a fairly typical Altolamprologus, and like the other two species of that genus a ferocious (for its size) carnivore preying on smaller fish such as juvenile cichlids. Analysis of mtDNA NADH dehydrogenase subunit 2 sequence data confirms that it is closer to Altolamprologus than to Neolamprologus, but still represents a lineage well distinct from the other Altolamprologus.

The reason for these unclear relationships may be that the origin of A. fasciatus lies in hybridization of a female of the original Altolamprologus and a male of some other lineage of Lamprologini. Such an event would have happened long ago enough to arguably place A. fasciatus in a monotypic genus, though such inconvenient arrangements are generally avoided in taxonomy.

Alternatively, A. fasciatus could be an offshoot of its genus that has adapted to mimic Neolamprologus or similar cichlids which hunt invertebrates. Such fishes are not considered a threat by the prey of A. fasciatus, and thus the predator may be able to catch its prey unawares. But it not known whether A. fasciatus indeed represents a case of cryptic or other aggressive mimicry. Lepidiolamprologus mimicus – the only Lamprologine for which aggressive mimicry has been confirmed as of mid-2008 – is a Batesian-Wallacian aggressive mimic; it appears similar to females of Paracyprichromis brieni and joins swarms of that species to feed on their young.

Given the basal position of A. fasciatus in its genus, it may also be that there is really nothing unusual about this species: it might simply represent a missing link between the "typical" Altolamprologus and other Lamprologines, retaining the shape of the latter while already possessing several other apomorphies of the former, and successful enough to persist for a long time in its ecological niche. Detailed studies of its anatomy, genetics, and behavior will probably be necessary to decide what the underlying reasons for this species' unusual appearance are.
