= Calvus =

Calvus (Latin for "bald") may refer to:

== People ==
- Gaius Licinius Macer Calvus (82 BC–c. 47 BC), orator and poet of ancient Rome
- Gnaeus Cornelius Scipio Calvus (died 211 BC), Roman general and statesman
- Constantine III of Scotland (before 971–997), King of Scots, known in Latin as Constantinus Calvus
- Baldwin II, Margrave of Flanders (c. 865–918), nicknamed "Calvus"
- Owain Foel (fl. 1018), King of the Cumbrians, also known as Eugenius Calvus

== See also ==
- Altolamprologus calvus, a species of Cichlidae fish from Lake Tanganyika, Africa
- Cumulonimbus calvus, a type of cloud
