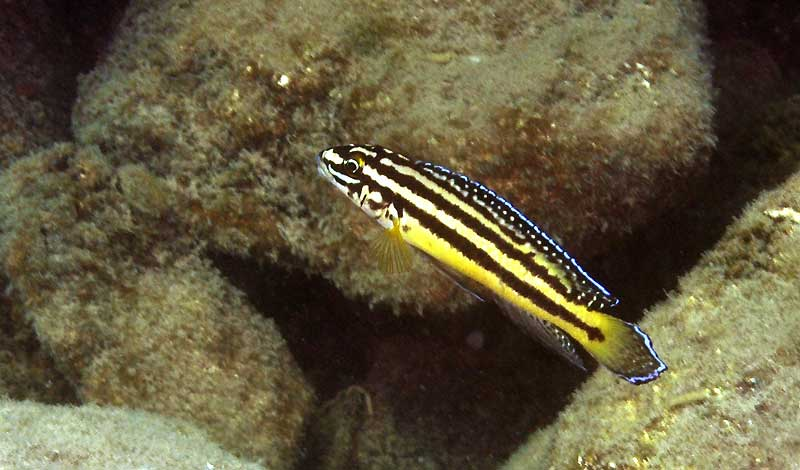

Scientific classification
- Kingdom: Animalia
- Phylum: Chordata
- Class: Actinopterygii
- Order: Cichliformes
- Family: Cichlidae
- Genus: Julidochromis
- Species: J. marksmithi

Binomial name
- Julidochromis marksmithi W. E. Burgess, 2014

= Julidochromis marksmithi =

Species of fish

Julidochromis marksmithi is a species of cichlid from the tribe Lamprologini of the subfamily Pseudocrenilabrinae which is endemic to Lake Tanganyika where it occurs on the Tanzanian shore around Kiplipi in Nkasi District.

== Etymology ==
The specific name of this fish honours the aquarist Mark Smith.
