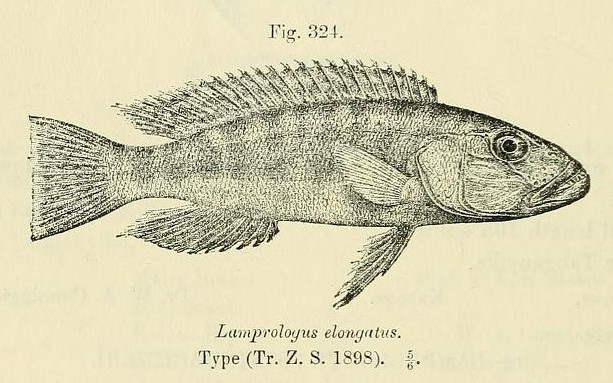
- Lepidiolamprologus elongatus
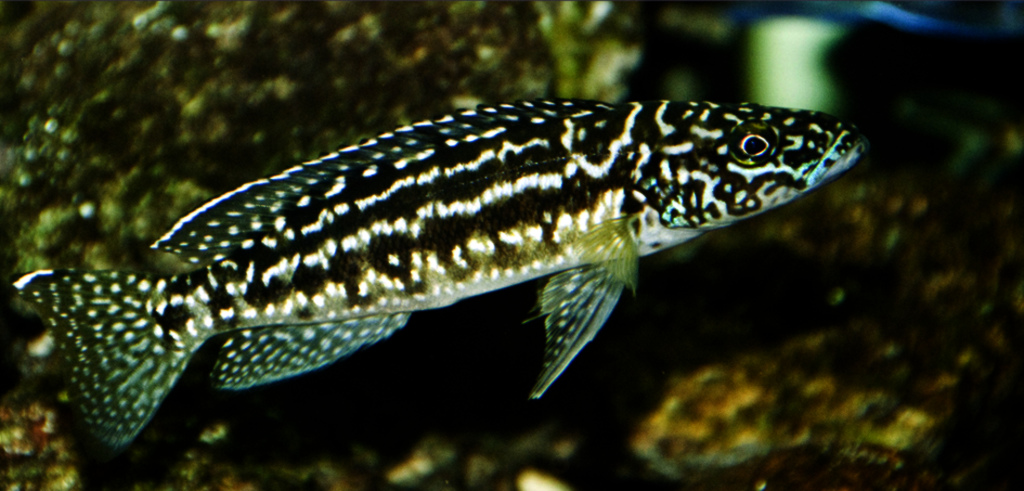
- (L. nkambae)

Scientific classification
- Kingdom: Animalia
- Phylum: Chordata
- Class: Actinopterygii
- Order: Cichliformes
- Family: Cichlidae
- Tribe: Lamprologini
- Genus: Lepidiolamprologus; Pellegrin, 1903

Type species
- Lamprologus elongatus Boulenger, 1898

Synonyms
- Lepidolamprologus (lapsus)

= Lepidiolamprologus =

Genus of fishes

Lepidiolamprologus is a small genus of cichlids endemic to Lake Tanganyika in eastern Africa. It is closely related to Altolamprologus. and there is the possibility that a revision of the genus could see more species added.

The placement of L. cunningtoni has been questioned, as it seems to be a close relative of N. modestus and the Fourspine Cichlid (N. tetracanthus), though with hybridization running rampant in the Lamprologini, one cannot entirely be sure of its relationships at present. However it differs enough from the other species in Lepidiolamprologus to conclude that it may not belong in this genus.

== Species ==
There are currently ten recognized species in this genus:

- Lepidiolamprologus attenuatus (Steindachner, 1909)
- Lepidiolamprologus boulengeri (Steindachner, 1909)
- Lepidiolamprologus elongatus (Boulenger, 1898)
- Lepidiolamprologus hecqui (Boulenger, 1899)
- Lepidiolamprologus kamambae S. O. Kullander, Ma. Karlsson & Mi. Karlsson, 2012
- Lepidiolamprologus kendalli (Poll & D. J. Stewart, 1977)
- Lepidiolamprologus meeli (Poll, 1948)
- Lepidiolamprologus mimicus Schelly, T. Takahashi, I. R. Bills & M. Hori, 2007
- Lepidiolamprologus pleuromaculatus Trewavas & Poll, 1952
- Lepidiolamprologus profundicola (Poll, 1949)

Synonyms

- Lepidiolamprologus nkambae (Staeck, 1978); valid as N. kendalli
