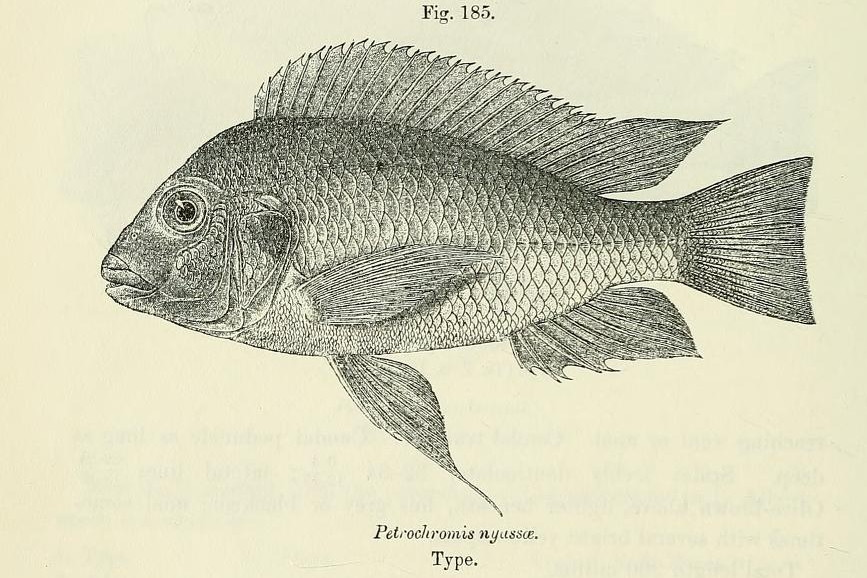

Conservation status
- Least Concern (IUCN 3.1)

Scientific classification
- Kingdom: Animalia
- Phylum: Chordata
- Class: Actinopterygii
- Order: Cichliformes
- Family: Cichlidae
- Genus: Petrochromis
- Species: P. polyodon

Binomial name
- Petrochromis polyodon Boulenger, 1898

Synonyms
- Perissodus polyodon (Boulenger, 1898); Petrochromis nyassae Boulenger, 1902

= Petrochromis polyodon =

Species of fish

Petrochromis polyodon is a species of cichlid endemic to Lake Tanganyika found in areas with rocky substrates where it can graze on algae. This species coexists with other herbivorous cichlids such as Tropheus moorii and Telmatochromis temporalis. Individuals can reach lengths of 40 cm or 16 inches and 1 kg in weight. They can be found in the aquarium trade.
