= Telmatochromis brichardi =

Scientific classification
- Kingdom: Animalia
- Phylum: Chordata
- Class: Actinopterygii
- Order: Cichliformes
- Family: Cichlidae
- Genus: Telmatochromis
- Species: T. brichardi

Binomial name
- Telmatochromis brichardi Louisy, 1989

Species of fish

Telmatochromis brichardi is a species of cichlid from the tribe Lamprologini, part of the subfamily Pseudocrenilabrinae, endemic to Lake Tanganyika. It feeds on algae in rocky habitat. It is a cavity nester which forms temporary pairs for breeding, in which the male defends the territory and the female tends the brood.

== Etymology ==
The specific name honours the aquarium fish dealer Pierre Brichard (1921–1990).
