= Petrochromis macrognathus =

Conservation status
- Data Deficient (IUCN 3.1)

Scientific classification
- Kingdom: Animalia
- Phylum: Chordata
- Class: Actinopterygii
- Order: Cichliformes
- Family: Cichlidae
- Genus: Petrochromis
- Species: P. macrognathus

Binomial name
- Petrochromis macrognathus Yamaoka, 1983

Species of fish

Petrochromis macrognathus is a species of cichlid endemic to Lake Tanganyika found in areas with rocky substrates where it can graze on algae. This species can reach a length of 16.2 cm (6.4 in). It can be found in the aquarium trade.
