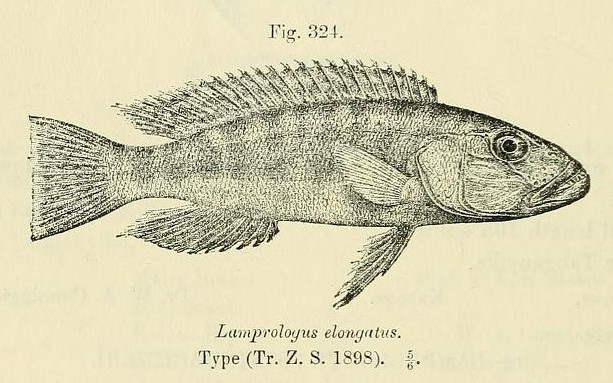

Conservation status
- Least Concern (IUCN 3.1)

Scientific classification
- Kingdom: Animalia
- Phylum: Chordata
- Class: Actinopterygii
- Order: Cichliformes
- Family: Cichlidae
- Genus: Lepidiolamprologus
- Species: L. elongatus

Binomial name
- Lepidiolamprologus elongatus (Boulenger, 1898)

Synonyms
- Lamprologus elongatus Boulenger, 1898

= Lepidiolamprologus elongatus =

Species of fish

Lepidiolamprologus elongatus is a species of cichlid endemic to Lake Tanganyika where it prefers rocky areas. This species is a carnivorous predator on fish. This species can reach a length of 32.5 centimetres (12.8 in) TL. It can also be found in the aquarium trade.
