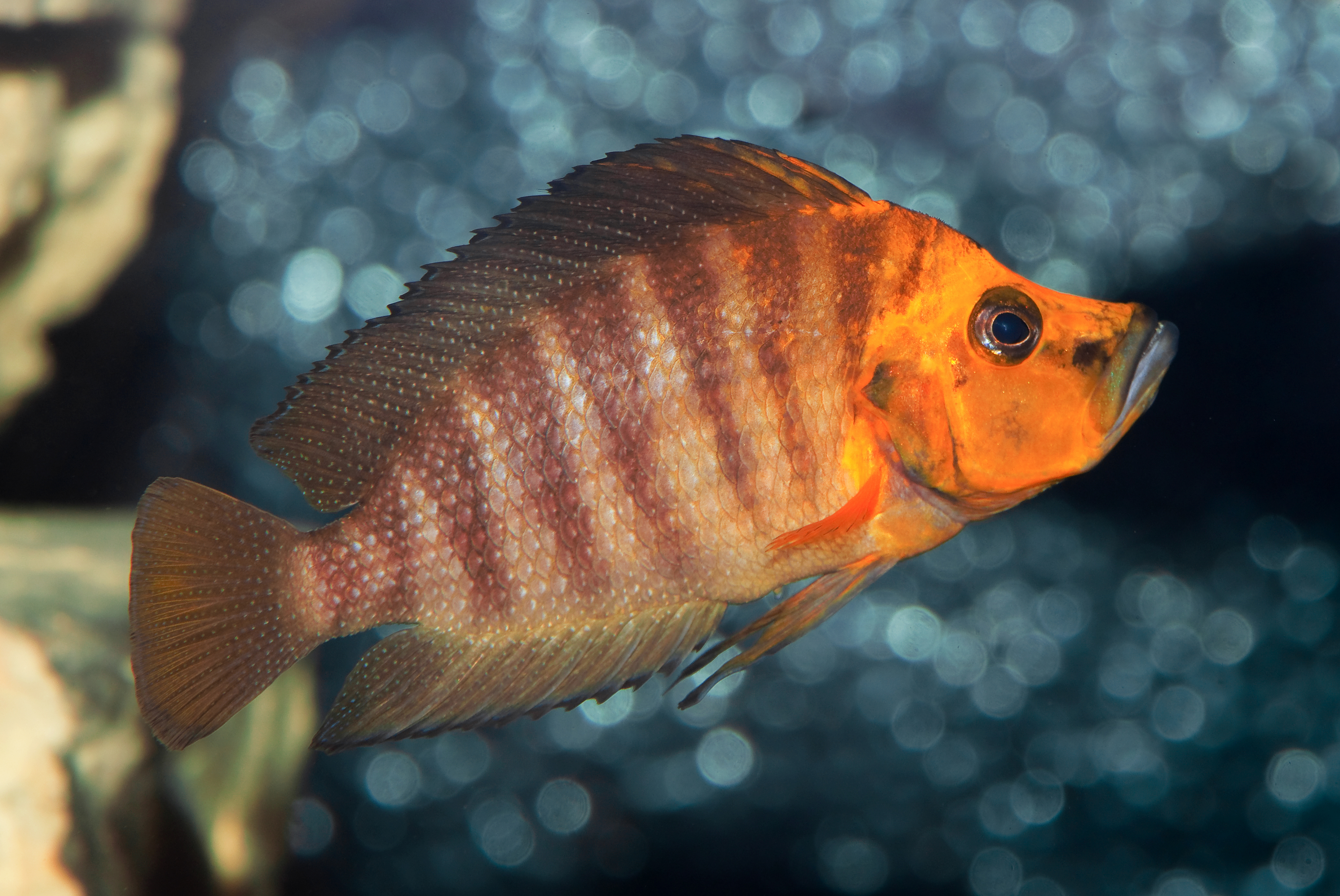

Conservation status
- Least Concern (IUCN 3.1)

Scientific classification
- Kingdom: Animalia
- Phylum: Chordata
- Class: Actinopterygii
- Order: Cichliformes
- Family: Cichlidae
- Genus: Altolamprologus
- Species: A. compressiceps

Binomial name
- Altolamprologus compressiceps (Boulenger, 1898)

Synonyms
- Lamprologus compressiceps Boulenger, 1898; Haplochromis compressiceps (Boulenger, 1898); Neolamprologus compressiceps (Boulenger, 1898)

= Altolamprologus compressiceps =

Species of fish

Altolamprologus compressiceps, locally known as lupapa, is a species of fish in the family Cichlidae. It is endemic to the shallow rocky areas of Lake Tanganyika. It is not considered threatened by the IUCN.

== Description ==
A. compressiceps are close relatives to A. calvus and can be distinguished by their shorter jaws and turned up snout. Calvus have a long sloping face, less distinct bars, and more distinct spots.

Several local variants exist, and some may prove to be distinct species or subspecies. Some examples include:

- 'Fire Fin'
- 'Gold'
- 'Gold Head Kasanga'
- 'Kigoma'
- 'Mutondwe'
- 'Red Fin'
- 'Yellow Chaitika'
- 'Zaire Gold'

== Evolutionary biology ==
Lake Tanganyika holds at least 250 species of cichlid fish and there are still undescribed species in the lake. Almost all (98%) of the Tanganyika cichlids are endemic to the lake and it is thus an important biological resource for the study of speciation in evolution.
