= Lepidiolamprologus profundicola =

Conservation status
- Least Concern (IUCN 3.1)

Scientific classification
- Kingdom: Animalia
- Phylum: Chordata
- Class: Actinopterygii
- Order: Cichliformes
- Family: Cichlidae
- Genus: Lepidiolamprologus
- Species: L. profundicola

Binomial name
- Lepidiolamprologus profundicola (Poll, 1949)

Synonyms
- Lamprologus profundicola Poll, 1949

Species of fish

Lepidiolamprologus profundicola is a species of carnivorous, fish-eating cichlid endemic to Lake Tanganyika where it is found in rocky areas, avoiding areas with a sandy substrate, at relatively deeper depths than its congeners. This species can reach a length of 30.5 centimetres (12.0 in) TL. It can also be found in the aquarium trade.
