= Lepidiolamprologus pleuromaculatus =

Conservation status
- Least Concern (IUCN 3.1)

Scientific classification
- Kingdom: Animalia
- Phylum: Chordata
- Class: Actinopterygii
- Order: Cichliformes
- Family: Cichlidae
- Genus: Lepidiolamprologus
- Species: L. pleuromaculatus

Binomial name
- Lepidiolamprologus pleuromaculatus (Trewavas & Poll, 1952)

Synonyms
- Lamprologus pleuromaculatus Trewavas & Poll, 1952; Neolamprologus pleuromaculatus (Trewavas & Poll, 1952)

Species of fish

Lepidiolamprologus pleuromaculatus is a species of cichlid endemic to Lake Tanganyika where it is only known to occur in the northern half of the lake. This species can reach a length of 12 centimetres (4.7 in) TL. It can also be found in the aquarium trade.
