= Petrochromis famula =

Conservation status
- Least Concern (IUCN 3.1)

Scientific classification
- Kingdom: Animalia
- Phylum: Chordata
- Class: Actinopterygii
- Order: Cichliformes
- Family: Cichlidae
- Genus: Petrochromis
- Species: P. famula

Binomial name
- Petrochromis famula Matthes & Trewavas, 1960

Species of fish

Petrochromis famula is a species of cichlid endemic to Lake Tanganyika on rocky substrates on which they can graze. This species can reach a length of 15.1 cm (5.9 in). It can be found in the aquarium trade.
