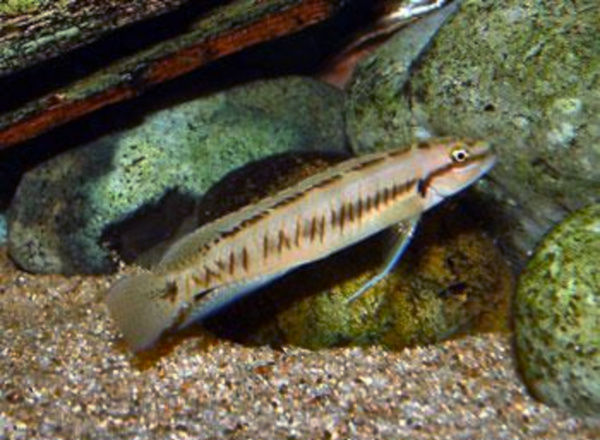

Conservation status
- Least Concern (IUCN 3.1)

Scientific classification
- Kingdom: Animalia
- Phylum: Chordata
- Class: Actinopterygii
- Order: Cichliformes
- Family: Cichlidae
- Genus: Telmatochromis
- Species: T. vittatus

Binomial name
- Telmatochromis vittatus Boulenger, 1898

= Telmatochromis vittatus =

Species of fish

Telmatochromis vittatus is a species of cichlid endemic to Lake Tanganyika usually at depths of from 5 to 10 metres (16 to 33 ft) but occasionally down to 20 metres (66 ft). This species can reach a length of 8.6 centimetres (3.4 in) TL. It can also be found in the aquarium trade.
