= Telmatochromis brachygnathus =

Conservation status
- Least Concern (IUCN 3.1)

Scientific classification
- Kingdom: Animalia
- Phylum: Chordata
- Class: Actinopterygii
- Order: Cichliformes
- Family: Cichlidae
- Genus: Telmatochromis
- Species: T. brachygnathus

Binomial name
- Telmatochromis brachygnathus Hanssens & Snoeks, 2003

Species of fish

Telmatochromis brachygnathus is a species of cichlid endemic to Lake Tanganyika. This species can reach a length of 7.6 centimetres (3.0 in) SL.
