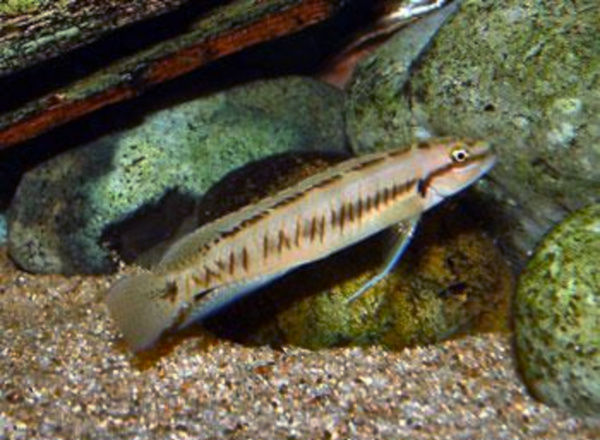
- Telmatochromis vittatus

Scientific classification
- Kingdom: Animalia
- Phylum: Chordata
- Class: Actinopterygii
- Order: Cichliformes
- Family: Cichlidae
- Tribe: Lamprologini
- Genus: Telmatochromis; Boulenger, 1898

Type species
- Telmatochromis temporalis Boulenger, 1898

= Telmatochromis =

Genus of fishes

Telmatochromis is a small cichlid genus of the subfamily Pseudocrenilabrinae. These ray-finned fishes are endemic to the Lake Tanganyika basin (mostly in the lake itself, but also its outflow rivers Malagarasi and Lukuga) in Africa.

== Systematics ==
Analysis of their mtDNA NADH dehydrogenase subunit 2 (ND2) sequence shows that hybridization must have played some role in the evolution of this genus.

For one thing, it might be that Telmatochromis is close to Julidochromis, which they somewhat resemble. A possibility is hybridization between the ancestor of Telmatochromis and a lineage of Julidochromis which later gave rise to J. marlieri and the Convict Julie (J. regani). Similar ND2 DNA has been found in these and T. bifrenatus, T. brichardi and T. temporalis.

T. vittatus on the other hand has a ND2 DNA sequence resembling that of Lamprologus congoensis and L. teugelsi. But T. vittatus does not at all appear very similar to these species, and in fact may well be closer to T. bifrenatus and T. brichardi than to T. temporalis. That would mean that male ancestors of T. vittatus had successfully interbred with female Lamprologus after the lineage of the former had diverged from its relatives.

== Species ==
There are nine recognized species in this genus:

- Telmatochromis bifrenatus G. S. Myers, 1936
- Telmatochromis brachygnathus Hanssens & Snoeks, 2003
- Telmatochromis brichardi Louisy, 1989
- Telmatochromis devosi (Schelly, Stiassny & Seegers, 2003)
- Telmatochromis dhonti (Boulenger, 1919)
- Telmatochromis macrolepis (Borodin, 1931)
- Telmatochromis salzburgeri Indermaur, Schedel & Ronco, 2024
- Telmatochromis temporalis Boulenger, 1898
- Telmatochromis vittatus Boulenger, 1898
