= Telmatochromis bifrenatus =

Conservation status
- Least Concern (IUCN 3.1)

Scientific classification
- Kingdom: Animalia
- Phylum: Chordata
- Class: Actinopterygii
- Order: Cichliformes
- Family: Cichlidae
- Genus: Telmatochromis
- Species: T. bifrenatus

Binomial name
- Telmatochromis bifrenatus G. S. Myers, 1936

Species of fish

Telmatochromis bifrenatus is a species of cichlid endemic to Lake Tanganyika where it can be found at depths of from 5 to 10 metres (16 to 33 ft), occasionally down to 20 metres (66 ft). This species can reach a length of 9 centimetres (3.5 in) TL. It can also be found in the aquarium trade where it is considered to be an excellent fish for beginners.
