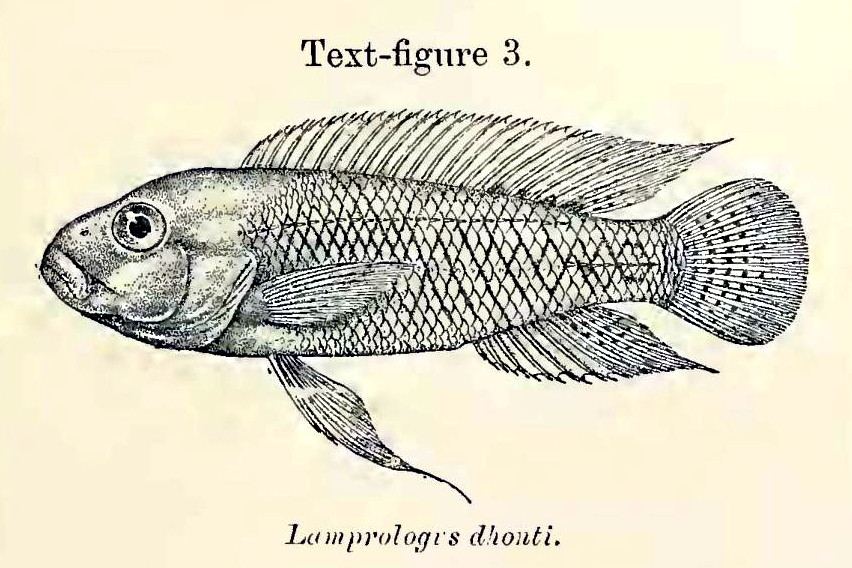

Conservation status
- Least Concern (IUCN 3.1)

Scientific classification
- Kingdom: Animalia
- Phylum: Chordata
- Class: Actinopterygii
- Order: Cichliformes
- Family: Cichlidae
- Genus: Telmatochromis
- Species: T. dhonti

Binomial name
- Telmatochromis dhonti (Boulenger, 1919)

Synonyms
- Lamprologus dhonti Boulenger, 1919; Telmatochromis caninus Poll, 1942

= Telmatochromis dhonti =

Species of fish

Telmatochromis dhonti is a species of cichlid endemic to Lake Tanganyika where it prefers rocky substrates. This species can reach a length of 12 centimetres (4.7 in) TL. It can also be found in the aquarium trade. The specific name honours the collector of the type G. Dhont-De Bie of the Belgian East African Expeditionary Force.
