= Petrochromis fasciolatus =

Conservation status
- Least Concern (IUCN 3.1)

Scientific classification
- Kingdom: Animalia
- Phylum: Chordata
- Class: Actinopterygii
- Order: Cichliformes
- Family: Cichlidae
- Genus: Petrochromis
- Species: P. fasciolatus

Binomial name
- Petrochromis fasciolatus Boulenger, 1914

Species of fish

Petrochromis fasciolatus is a species of cichlid endemic to Lake Tanganyika found on rocky substrates where they can graze. This species can reach a length of 15 cm (5.9 in). It can be found in the aquarium trade.
