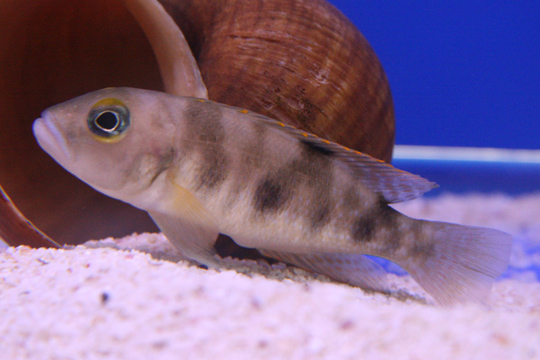

Conservation status
- Least Concern (IUCN 3.1)

Scientific classification
- Kingdom: Animalia
- Phylum: Chordata
- Class: Actinopterygii
- Order: Cichliformes
- Family: Cichlidae
- Genus: Lepidiolamprologus
- Species: L. boulengeri

Binomial name
- Lepidiolamprologus boulengeri (Steindachner, 1909)

Synonyms
- Julidochromis boulengeri Steindachner, 1909; Lamprologus boulengeri (Steindachner, 1909); Neolamprologus boulengeri (Steindachner, 1909); Lamprologus kiritvaithai Meyer, Foerster & Dieckhoff, 1986; Neolamprologus kiritvaithai (Meyer, Foerster & Dieckhoff, 1986)

= Lepidiolamprologus boulengeri =

Species of fish

Lepidiolamprologus boulengeri is a species of cichlid endemic to Lake Tanganyika where it is known from the Tanzanian coast in the northern part of the lake. Pairs of this species live together in their territory and the female lives in snail shells in a pit that they have dug in the sand. This species can reach a length of 6.2 centimetres (2.4 in) TL. This species can also be found in the aquarium trade.

== Etymology ==
The specific name of this cichlid honours the Belgian born British ichthyologist and herpetologist George Albert Boulenger (1858–1937).
