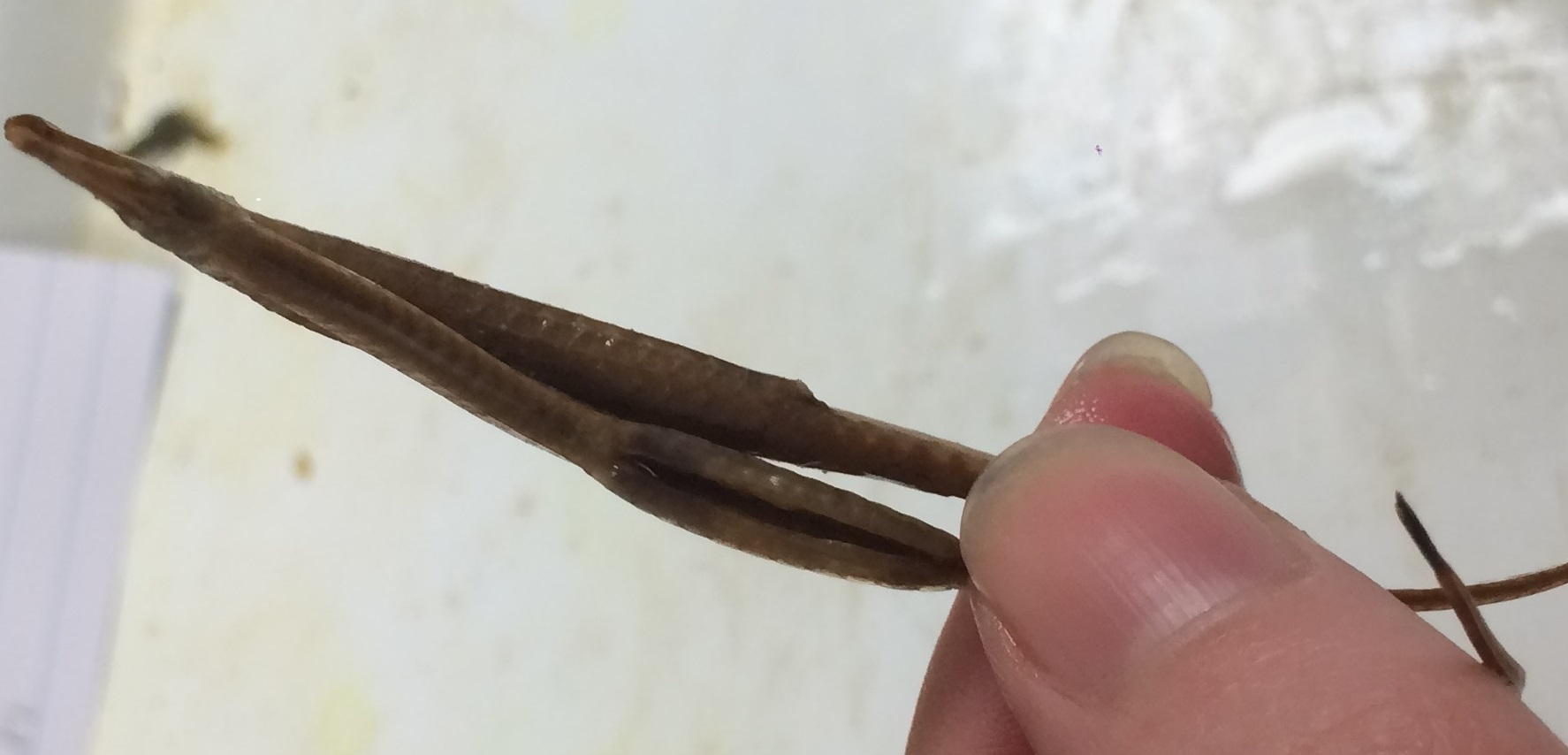

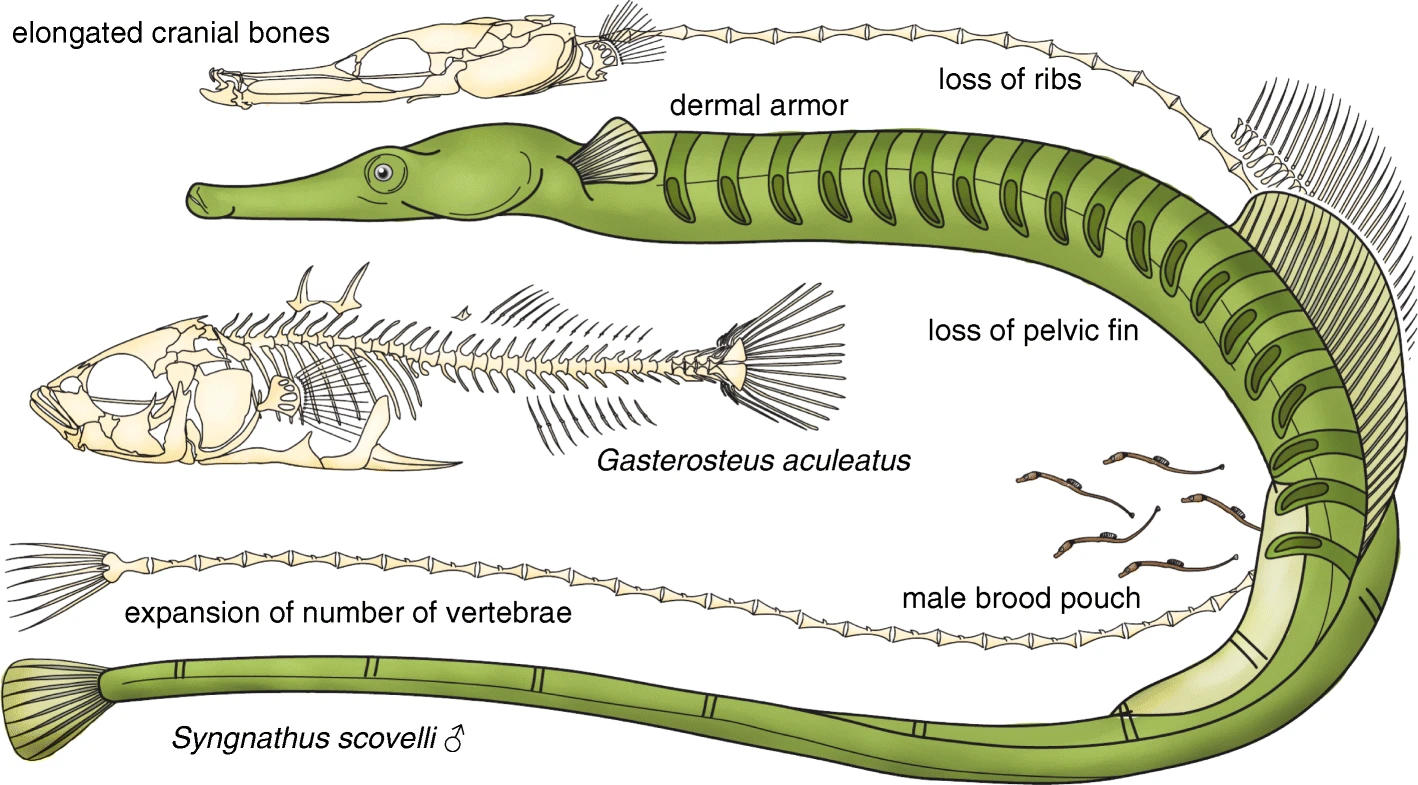
- Some derived traits in pipefishes and the relatives of the pipefish.

Conservation status
- Least Concern (IUCN 3.1)

Scientific classification
- Kingdom: Animalia
- Phylum: Chordata
- Class: Actinopterygii
- Division: Teleostei
- Order: Syngnathiformes
- Family: Syngnathidae
- Genus: Syngnathus
- Species: S. scovelli

Binomial name
- Syngnathus scovelli (Evermann & Kendall, 1896)

Synonyms
- Siphostoma scovelli Evermann & Kendall, 1896

= Gulf pipefish =

Species of fish

The Gulf pipefish (Syngnathus scovelli) is a species of pipefish in the member of the taxonomic family Sygnathidae. Syngnathus scovelli is native to the region of south Florida, United States, the Atlantic Ocean, etc. S. scovelli is similar to Microphis brachyurus.

== Description ==
S. scovelli is an elongated fish encased in body rings. They are uniformly brown or dark olive green in color, with silvery, white vertical bars along the sides, sometimes appearing Y-shaped. Their maximum size is 183 mm SL, although most gulf pipefish rarely exceed 100 mm SL. They have a short snout, its length going into its HL 1.9-2.3 times. This species has 18-19 trunk rings and 30-34 tail rings. The dorsal fin is moderate in length and spans 2-4 trunk rings and 3-5 tail rings. In females, the dorsal fin is usually banded. The caudal fin is present and rounded. The anal fin is greatly reduced, and the pelvic fins are absent. Females have a well-developed keel on their abdomen that is reduced in both juveniles and males. Mature males have a brood pouch on their underside that spans 10-13 tail rings.

== Diet ==
Gulf pipefish feed during the day time with their diet mainly consists of crustaceans such as copepods, amphipods, tanaids, and isopods, among other small crustaceans. Individuals less than 50 mm SL feed almost exclusively on copepods. Larger individuals feed more on amphipods, crustacean eggs, and caridean shrimp.

== Habitat ==
The gulf pipefish is a marine-estuarine species. It commonly inhabits shallow, highly vegetated shoreline areas with clear, tannin-stained streams and rivers. They also commonly inhabit estuarine seagrass meadows. However, their species population have been declining due to the impact of growing human (Homo sapiens) population size. This causes negative effects such as nutrient loading, pollution, harmful algae blooms and habitat degeneration. There has been large substantial declines in the waters of the Atlantic Ocean coast and the coast of Florida, United states. The loss of much of the seagrass Meadows in the Indian River Lagoon along with the harmful ongoing algae blooms is causing a decline in the gulf pipefish species.

== Reproduction ==
Not much is known concerning age and growth of this species; they may mature within six months and typically live less than one year. There is also limited knowledge on larval development. The gulf pipefish breeds in fresh, brackish, or highly saline water. Spawning can occur throughout the year, except on the northern Gulf Coast where there is a winter decline in reproductive activity. The male develops a brood pouch at maturity that remains for life.

They have an elaborate courtship ritual that is initiated by the female. The ritual consists of the two swimming together and bobbing to the surface of the water, before intertwining their bodies. After mating, the male rubs his brood pouch along the bottom. This is thought to help move the eggs from the front of his pouch to the rear. When eggs are mature, they are bright orange in color, oval to pear-shaped, and on average 1.3 mm in diameter. The eggs stay in the ovarian lumen until being transported to the brood chamber for fertilization. After 14–15 days at 24.5 degrees Celsius, the eggs will hatch. Males are known to collect eggs from several different females.

== Distribution ==
This species ranges from the Atlantic coastal regions of northern Georgia (US state), southward along the Florida coast into the Gulf of Mexico, and south to São Paulo, Brazil. Populations of gulf pipefish have been reported in freshwaters of Louisiana at Lake St. John about 150 miles inland and in Texas at Lake Texana about 50 miles inland.

== Etymology ==
Sygnathus: jaw together; scovelli: named in honor of Josiah T. Scovell, who helped collect the original specimens

== See also ==
- Pipefish
- Syngnathidae
