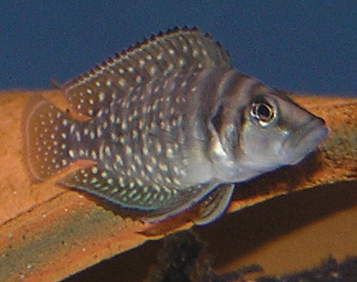
- Altolamprologus calvus

Scientific classification
- Kingdom: Animalia
- Phylum: Chordata
- Class: Actinopterygii
- Order: Cichliformes
- Family: Cichlidae
- Tribe: Lamprologini
- Genus: Altolamprologus; Poll, 1986

Type species
- Lamprologus compressiceps Boulenger, 1898

= Altolamprologus =

Genus of fishes

Altolamprologus is a small genus of pseudocrenilabrine cichlids endemic to Lake Tanganyika in eastern Africa. They inhabit areas of the lake with large amounts of rock, most frequently in water two to ten metres (6 ft 7 in to 32 ft 10 in) in depth. Two formally described species comprise this genus, with perhaps one dwarf A. compressiceps-like species being considered an undescribed species by some.

== Species ==
There are currently three recognized species in this genus:

Image	Name	Distribution
	Altolamprologus calvus (Poll, 1978)	Lake Tanganyika in eastern Africa
	Altolamprologus compressiceps (Boulenger, 1898)	Lake Tanganyika
	Altolamprologus fasciatus (Boulenger, 1898)	Lake Tanganyika

== Description ==
They are moderately-sized Lamprologines, growing to a total length of 13–15 cm (5–6 in) in adult males. Their bodies are laterally compressed and remarkably high-backed; hence the scientific name which means "high Lamprologus" (from Latin altus, "high"). They are predators which feed on large invertebrates and small fish, particularly crustaceans and juveniles of other cichlids.

== In the aquarium ==
Altolamprologus are hardy at the standard Lake Tanganyikan water parameters. They are not particularly well-suited for beginners due to their predatory habits however. They can be picky eaters and demand a variety of appropriate living prey to thrive, but they are also prone to gorging themselves if they like the offered food and may become too fat. They also require large tanks – at least one meter/yard in length – to show their natural behavior, and cannot be kept together with small fish or shrimps.

They can be a challenge to breed for the novice. These fish are cave spawners and will spawn under terracotta pot saucers or in large snail shells. They are a rather slow growing Lamprologine taking approximately two years to reach sexual maturity.
