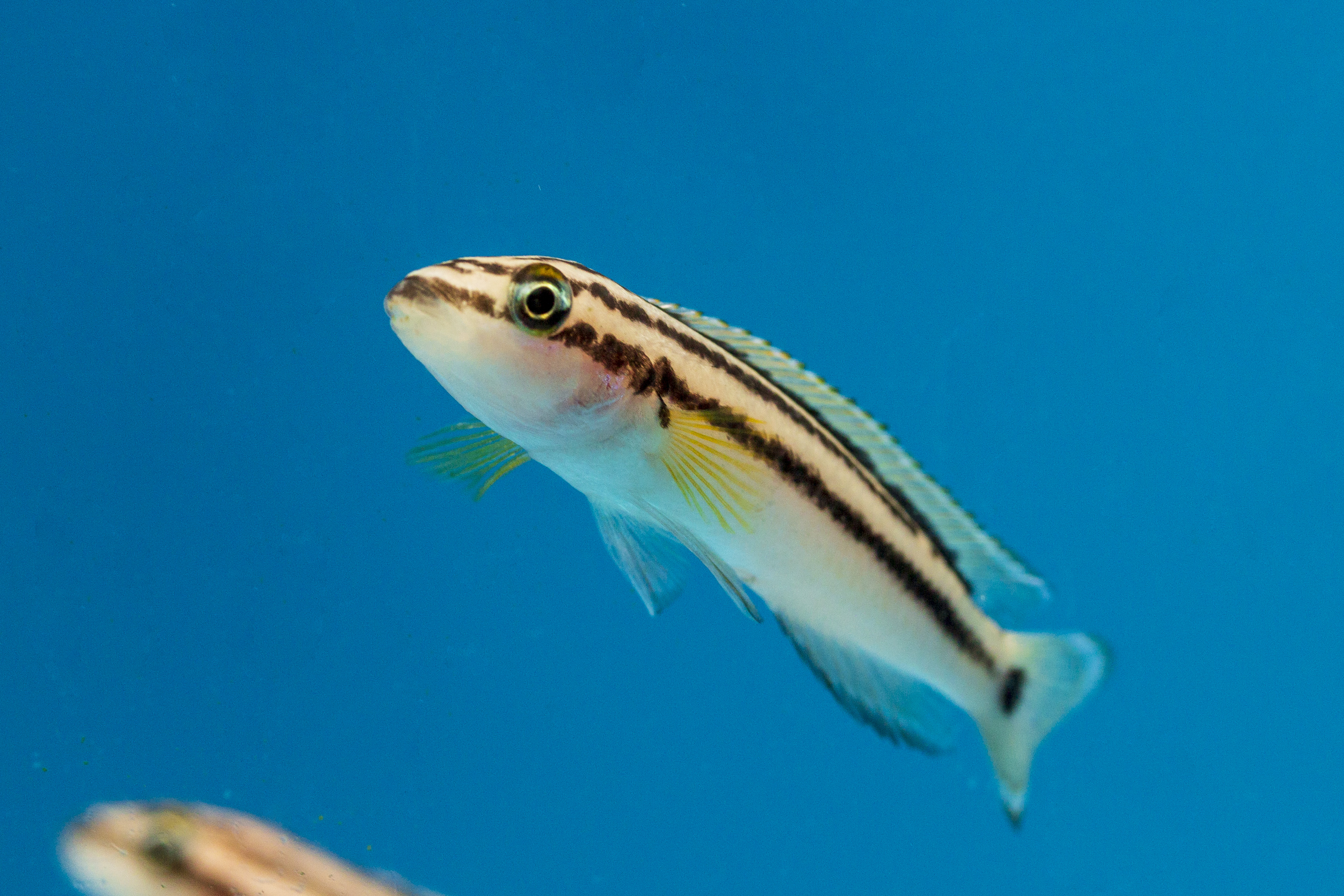
- Juvenile Golden Julie cichlid

Conservation status
- Near Threatened (IUCN 3.1)

Scientific classification
- Kingdom: Animalia
- Phylum: Chordata
- Class: Actinopterygii
- Division: Teleostei
- Order: Cichliformes
- Family: Cichlidae
- Genus: Julidochromis
- Species: J. ornatus

Binomial name
- Julidochromis ornatus Boulenger, 1898

= Golden julie =

Species of fish

The Golden Julie (Julidochromis ornatus) is a species of cichlid endemic to Lake Tanganyika, being found only in the extreme northern and southern shorelines of the lake in rocky environments. The name of the species, ornatus, is Latin for “ornate” or “decorated,” which refers to the golden, decorated appearance of the fish.

== Species description ==
The average size is about 4 cm-10 cm for adults. The juveniles have a white dorsal fin, while the adults have a yellow dorsal fin, occasionally with black markings on the tips. These fish have a mixture of yellow and white on the body. In the adults, a black spot is present at the base of the rounded caudal fin and there are three black bands along the sides and face of the fish.

A similar species to the Golden Julie (Julidochromis ornatus) is the Golden mbuna (Melanochromis auratus).

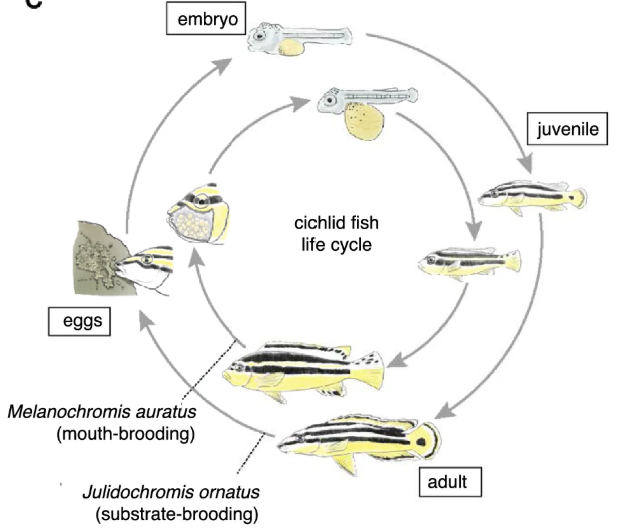
Differences in morphology in Julidochromis ornatus and Melanochromis auratus

To differentiate between these species, the Melanochromis auratus has more black markings on their pectoral and pelvic fins. Instead of a singular black spot on the caudal fin, there are multiple tiny spots present on only the upper part of the truncate caudal fin in M. auratus.

== Distribution ==
The Golden Julie is native to Lake Tanganyika, which is located in East Africa and consists of about 250 different species of cichlid fish. It is believed that this large diversity of cichlid species evolved from a common ancestor when the lake was formed about 9-12 million years ago. This common ancestor experienced rapid evolution through speciation and adaptive radiation for specific habitats, food, and other resources, that lead to this wide variety of cichlid species in Lake Tanganyika.

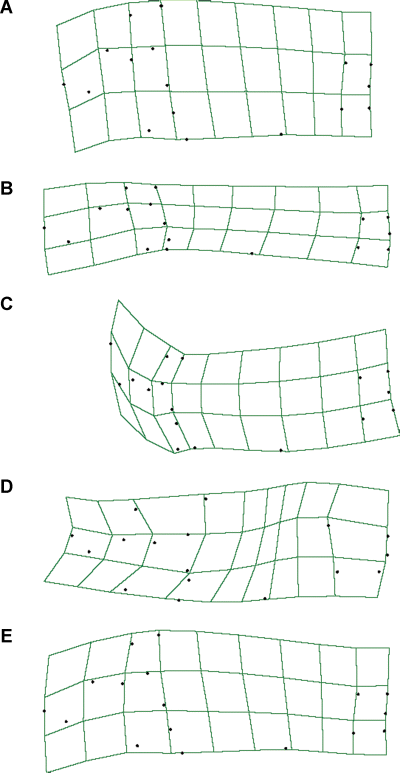
5 different body shapes of cichlid fishes with different feeding habits. Letter B (the second shape, elongated and narrow, is the Golden Julie, which is a benthic feeder

The differences in body shape and size of body parts of these diverse cichlid species occurred due to the habitat preferences and the trophic habitats of the fish. Golden Julie are distributed in the warm, freshwater ecosystems along the shorelines of this lake. Water temperature is around 22 °C-24 °C, with a high pH between 8–9. These fish reside in rocky areas and on or near the bottom of shallow areas, typically 4–12 meters in depth. This habitat choice, along with benthic feeding, results in the J. ornatus having an elongated and narrow body compared to other cichlid species that live in other habitats of this large lake.

== Life History ==
=== Reproduction ===
Golden Julie (Julidochromis ornatus) live in social groups that primarily cooperatively breed. Cooperative breeding is when both parents care for the eggs, along with helpers in the social group providing care and protection. Each social group uses one rock as the primary nest to lay their eggs and for shelter. For J. ornatus, the social groups include a dominant male and female breeder, with around zero to six subordinate helpers. Eventually, the monogamous pairing is disrupted by one of the parents searching for other fish to mate with.

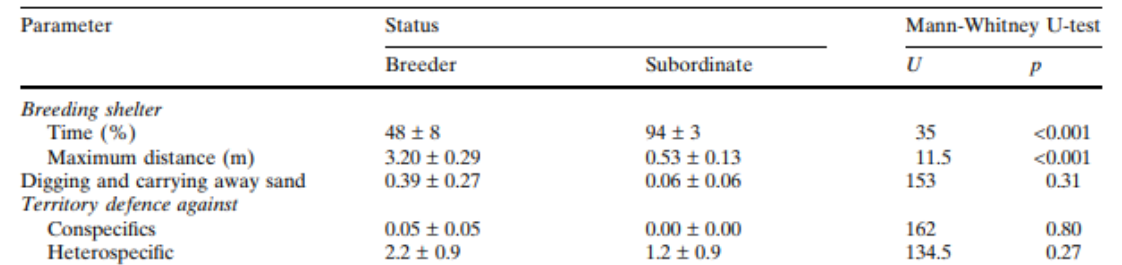
The percentage of time J. ornatus breeders and subordinates stay at the shelter and the distance (m) they travel away from the shelter.

Research has shown that the size of the breeder impacts the size of the helpers and the overall size and reproductive success of the group. Larger breeders had more helpers to defend the shelter and the eggs, resulting in higher reproductive success for that social group. In these groups, the subordinate fish, or helpers, defended the shelter at a greater percentage of time (94%) compared to the dominant breeders who resided at the shelter for about 48% of the time.

=== Feeding Habits ===
As part of the Order Cichliformes, this species has both pharyngeal jaws and oral jaws. The jaws are separated from each other, allowing the jaws to have different functions and use different mechanisms when feeding or hunting. Oral jaws are used to capture the prey. Pharyngeal jaws allow the fish to crush and process food. Primarily, J. ornatus are benthic feeders and omnivores that eat crustaceans, microorganisms, and scrape prey off of rocks with their teeth and separated jaws.

== Conservation Status ==
The IUCN conservation status of the Golden Julie is of "near threatened", due to their known range being only 200 km^{2} and their popularity in the live fish trade. Some humans utilize the Julidochromis ornatus as fish for their aquariums and breed them in captivity to be sold in markets. When this fish species reproduces in captivity instead of their normal habitat, the fish have shown alterations in their color and in their behavior.

A major threat to this species that could change their conservation status is climate change. Climate change continues to increase temperatures around the world including in Lake Tanganyika, the only habitat this species of fish is distributed in. As this lake increases temperature, the entire underwater ecosystem is being impacted. A 2020 study analyzed how the warming of Lake Tanganyika would affect the J. ornatus fish. The researchers discovered through experiments that an increase in the temperature of the water would increase the aggression shown by these fish. A rise in aggression in other ectothermic fish have shown that larger predators are more likely to hunt for fish who act aggressive, possibly altering the J. ornatus conservation status. More aggressive fish can also affect the food web, especially if a majority of this species is more aggressive, causing an unbalance and a reduction in this species’ food if they are hunting at a more rapid rate.

Not only can the increase in aggression impact the food web, it also may impact cooperatively breeding of this species. The aggression would make it challenging to find mates and care for their young to continue increasing the density of the population. Julidochromis ornatus is a territorial species, which may result in more predation or fights among this species and the loss of many fish. The possible reduction of cooperatively breeding and the increased fighting would decrease the population and possibly alter the conservation status of this species to be of concern.
