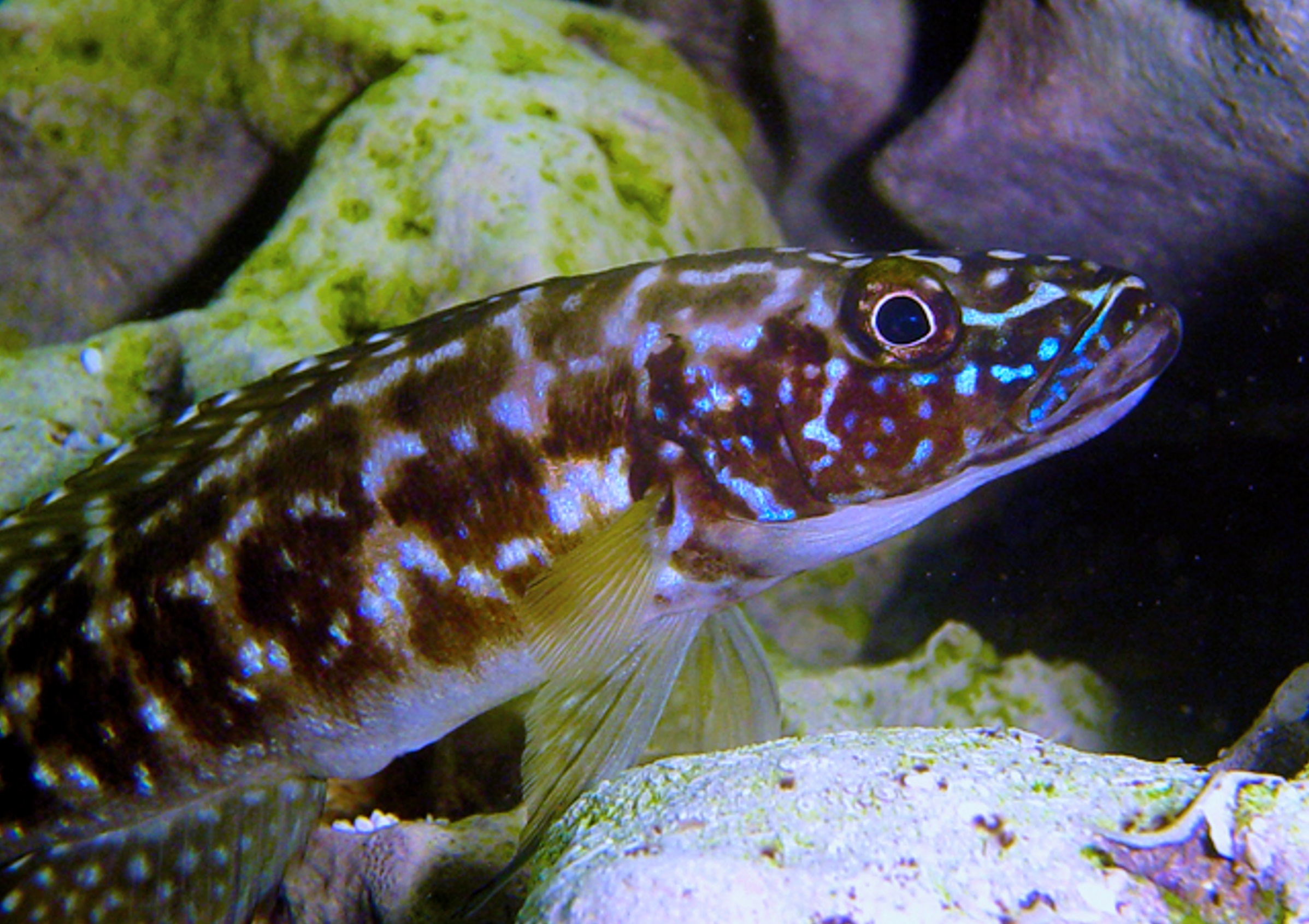
- Specimen raised in captivity

Conservation status
- Least Concern (IUCN 3.1)

Scientific classification
- Kingdom: Animalia
- Phylum: Chordata
- Class: Actinopterygii
- Order: Cichliformes
- Family: Cichlidae
- Genus: Lepidiolamprologus
- Species: L. kendalli

Binomial name
- Lepidiolamprologus kendalli (Poll & D. J. Stewart, 1977)

Synonyms
- Lamprologus kendalli Poll & Stewart, 1977; Lamprologus nkambae Staeck, 1978; Lepidiolamprologus nkambae (Staeck, 1978)

= Lepidiolamprologus kendalli =

Species of fish

Lepidiolamprologus kendalli is a species of cichlid endemic to Lake Tanganyika preferring rocky areas. This carnivorous species preys upon fish. This species can reach a length of 18 centimetres (7.1 in) TL. It can also be found in the aquarium trade.

== Etymology ==
The specific name honours the American fish ecologist Robert L. Kendall, who collected the type.
