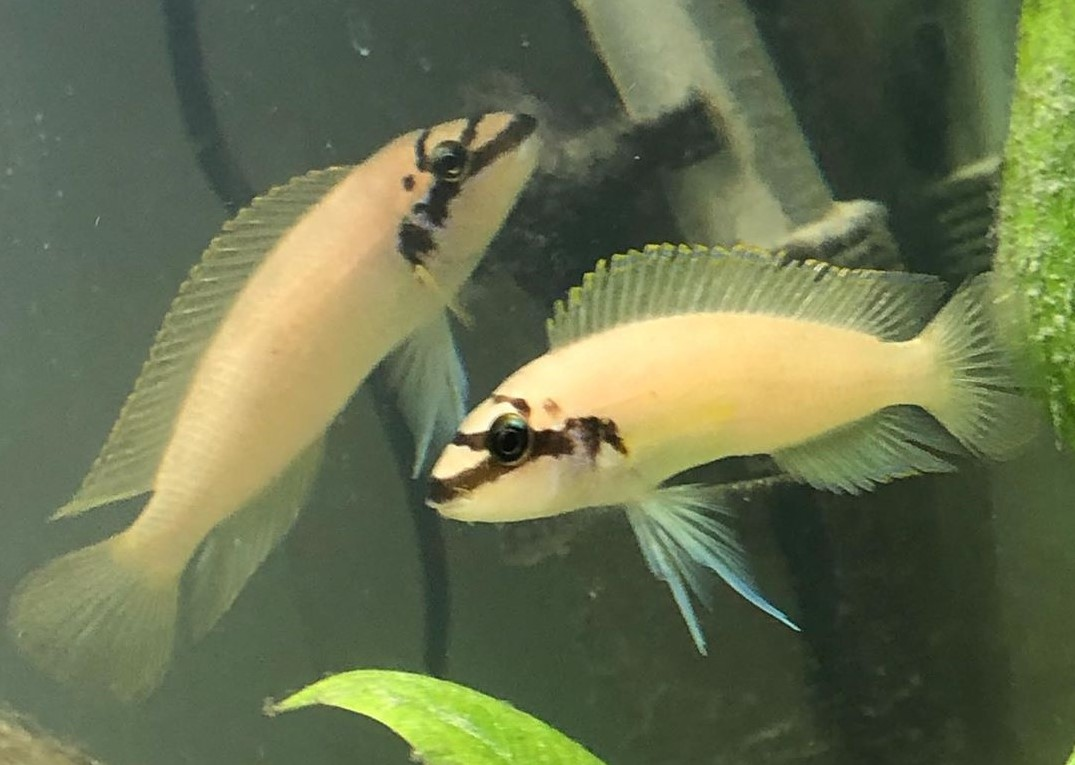

Conservation status
- Least Concern (IUCN 3.1)

Scientific classification
- Kingdom: Animalia
- Phylum: Chordata
- Class: Actinopterygii
- Order: Cichliformes
- Family: Cichlidae
- Genus: Chalinochromis
- Species: C. brichardi

Binomial name
- Chalinochromis brichardi Poll, 1974

= Chalinochromis brichardi =

Species of fish

Chalinochromis brichardi is a species of fish in the family Cichlidae. It is found in Burundi, the Democratic Republic of the Congo, Tanzania, and Zambia. It is endemic to Lake Tanganyika. It builds a nest of rubble which is hidden by plants or algae, and its diet consists primarily of invertebrates. The specific name of this fish honours the fish dealer Pierre Brichard (1921-1990), who was the collector of the type.

== Description ==
Adult specimens average a length of approximately 8.9 cm (3.5 inches), but larger specimens up to 14 cm (5.5 inches) have been recorded in captivity. C. brichardi lacks any body striping as an adult, only possessing barring around the facial region, which differentiates it from other Chalinochromis.

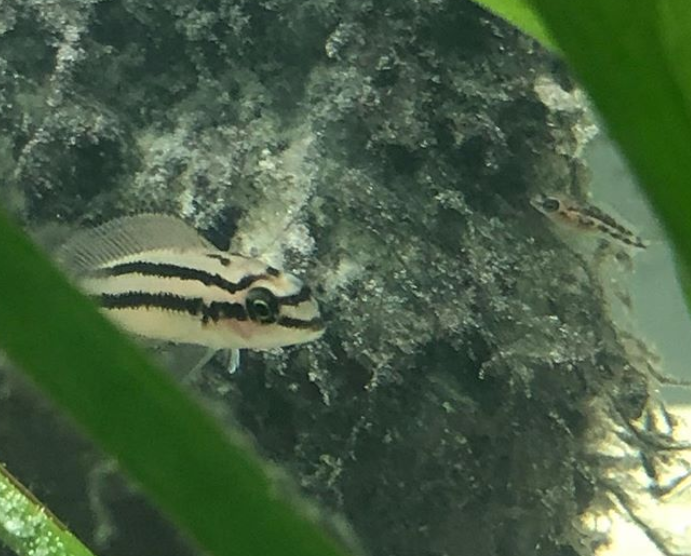
Juvenile C. Brichardi (left) and fry (right)

However, their markings change dramatically as they mature from juveniles to adult fish; as juveniles they display barring all along their body, much like other members of its genus, but this disappears as they mature with the exception of the black barring around the head.

== In the aquarium trade ==
Chalinochromis brichardi is found very rarely in the aquarium trade.

=== Food ===
Wild specimens feed on small crustaceans, insect larvae, and other live food that live in the aufwuchs. In eating this food, they also ingest sediment algae and sand. In the aquarium they have an adaptable palette and can be sustained on mysis shrimp, krill, flakes, pellets, mosquito larvae, brine shrimp, et cetera.

=== Tank parameters ===
Chalinochromis brichardi thrives in water with a pH of at least 8.2, preferably within the range of 8.5-8.7, and requires relatively to extremely hard water to survive. They require a minimum tank size of 114 liters (30 gallons). They prefer a rocky habitat with ample caves to spawn in. Due to their aggressive nature, it is not recommended to house this fish with any other species other than unobtrusive bottom feeders.
