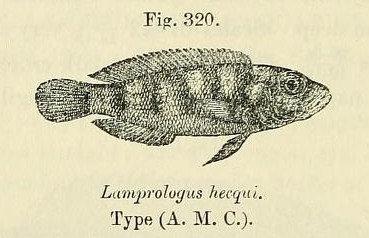

Conservation status
- Least Concern (IUCN 3.1)

Scientific classification
- Kingdom: Animalia
- Phylum: Chordata
- Class: Actinopterygii
- Order: Cichliformes
- Family: Cichlidae
- Genus: Lepidiolamprologus
- Species: L. hecqui

Binomial name
- Lepidiolamprologus hecqui (Boulenger, 1899)

Synonyms
- Lamprologus hecqui Boulenger, 1899; Neolamprologus hecqui (Boulenger, 1899)

= Lepidiolamprologus hecqui =

Species of fish

Lepidiolamprologus hecqui is a species of shell-living cichlid endemic to Lake Tanganyika. This species can reach a length of 8 centimetres (3.1 in) TL. This species can also be found in the aquarium trade.

== Etymology ==
The specific name of this fish honours the Belgian soldier and anti-slave trade campaigner Lieutenant Célestin Hecq (1859–1910) who collected a specimen of the catfish Auchenoglanis scutatus in the mouth of which the type of this species was discovered.
