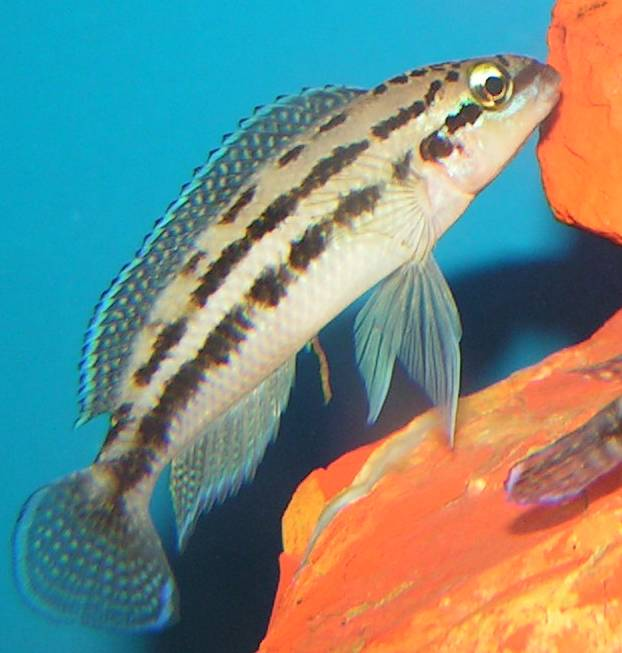

Conservation status
- Least Concern (IUCN 3.1)

Scientific classification
- Kingdom: Animalia
- Phylum: Chordata
- Class: Actinopterygii
- Order: Cichliformes
- Family: Cichlidae
- Genus: Julidochromis
- Species: J. dickfeldi

Binomial name
- Julidochromis dickfeldi Staeck, 1975

= Julidochromis dickfeldi =

Species of fish

Julidochromis dickfeldi is a species of cichlid endemic to Lake Tanganyika in Africa where it is only known from the southwestern portion. This species inhabits areas with rock/rubble substrates, each fish maintaining a territory around a crevice or crack. This species reaches a length of 11 centimetres (4.3 in) TL.

== Etymology ==
The specific name honours the German fishkeeper Alf Dickfeld who proposed the expedition on which the type was collected.

== See also ==
- List of freshwater aquarium fish species
