= Threadfin cichlid =

Conservation status
- Least Concern (IUCN 3.1)

Scientific classification
- Kingdom: Animalia
- Phylum: Chordata
- Class: Actinopterygii
- Order: Cichliformes
- Family: Cichlidae
- Genus: Petrochromis
- Species: P. trewavasae

Binomial name
- Petrochromis trewavasae Poll, 1948

Synonyms
- Perissodus trewavasae (Poll, 1948); Petrochromis trewavasae trewavasae Poll, 1948

Species of fish

The threadfin cichlid (Petrochromis trewavasae) is a species of cichlid endemic to Lake Tanganyika found in areas with rocky substrates on which it can graze on algae. This species can reach a length of 18 cm (7.1 in). It can be found in the aquarium trade. The specific name of this cichlid honours the British ichthyologist Ethelwynn Trewavas (1900-1993).

== See also ==
- List of freshwater aquarium fish species
