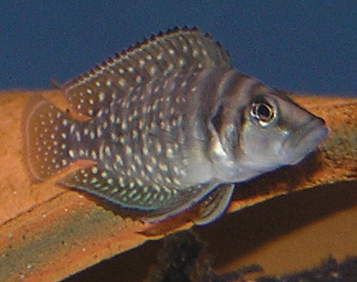

Conservation status
- Near Threatened (IUCN 3.1)

Scientific classification
- Kingdom: Animalia
- Phylum: Chordata
- Class: Actinopterygii
- Order: Cichliformes
- Family: Cichlidae
- Genus: Altolamprologus
- Species: A. calvus

Binomial name
- Altolamprologus calvus (Poll, 1978)

Synonyms
- Lamprologus calvus Poll, 1978; Neolamprologus calvus (Poll, 1978)

= Altolamprologus calvus =

Species of fish

Altolamprologus calvus, locally known as kaubao, is a cichlid endemic to the southern shoreline of Lake Tanganyika in eastern Africa. The species has an extremely laterally compressed body and a high dorsal fin. Males may grow to 13 cm (5 inches), while females are normally smaller.

It is physically similar to its close relative A. compressiceps, though it is less deep-bodied and has a longer snout.

A. calvus is commonly kept as an aquarium fish in setups devoted to East African fish. Several local variants exist. Examples include:

- 'Black Sambia'
- 'Black Pectoral'
- 'Black Zaire'
- 'Black Kapampa'
- 'Yellow'
- 'White'
