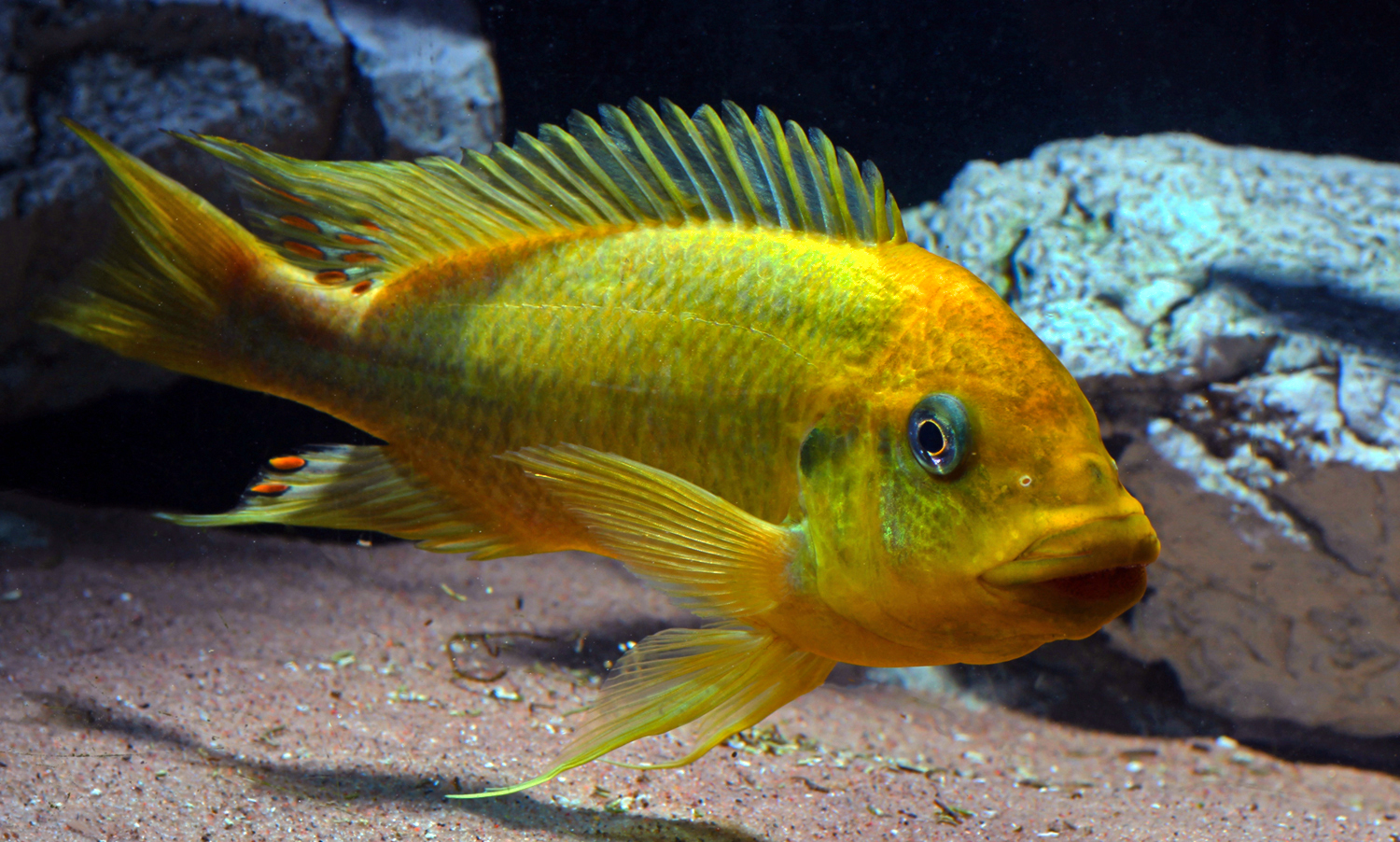
- Petrochromis sp. Moshi

Scientific classification
- Kingdom: Animalia
- Phylum: Chordata
- Class: Actinopterygii
- Order: Cichliformes
- Family: Cichlidae
- Tribe: Tropheini
- Genus: Petrochromis; Boulenger, 1898

Type species
- Petrochromis polyodon Boulenger, 1898

= Petrochromis =

Genus of fishes

Petrochromis is a genus of cichlids endemic to Lake Tanganyika in east Africa.

== Species ==
There are currently 8 recognized species are in this genus:

- Petrochromis ephippium Brichard, 1989
- Petrochromis famula Matthes & Trewavas, 1960
- Petrochromis fasciolatus Boulenger, 1914
- Petrochromis horii Takahashi & Koblmüller, 2014
- Petrochromis macrognathus Yamaoka, 1983
- Petrochromis orthognathus Matthes, 1959
- Petrochromis polyodon Boulenger, 1898
- Petrochromis trewavasae Poll, 1948 (Thread-fin cichlid)
