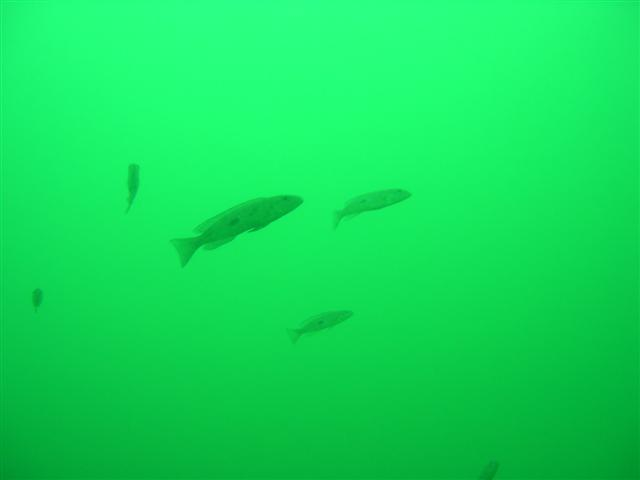

Conservation status
- Near Threatened (IUCN 3.1)

Scientific classification
- Kingdom: Animalia
- Phylum: Chordata
- Class: Actinopterygii
- Order: Cichliformes
- Family: Cichlidae
- Genus: Lepidiolamprologus
- Species: L. attenuatus

Binomial name
- Lepidiolamprologus attenuatus (Steindachner, 1909)

= Lepidiolamprologus attenuatus =

Species of fish

Lepidiolamprologus attenuatus is a species of cichlid endemic to Lake Tanganyika preferring areas with sandy substrates in which it digs crater-shaped nests. This species is carnivorous preying on fishes. This species can reach a length of 15 centimetres (5.9 in) TL. It can also be found in the aquarium trade.
