= Petrochromis orthognathus =

Conservation status
- Least Concern (IUCN 3.1)

Scientific classification
- Kingdom: Animalia
- Phylum: Chordata
- Class: Actinopterygii
- Order: Cichliformes
- Family: Cichlidae
- Genus: Petrochromis
- Species: P. orthognathus

Binomial name
- Petrochromis orthognathus Matthes, 1959

Synonyms
- Perrisodus orthognathus (Matthes, 1959)

Species of fish

Petrochromis orthognathus is a species of cichlid endemic to Lake Tanganyika found in areas with rocky substrates on which they can graze on algae. This species can reach a length of 16.5 cm (6.5 in). It can be found in the aquarium trade.
