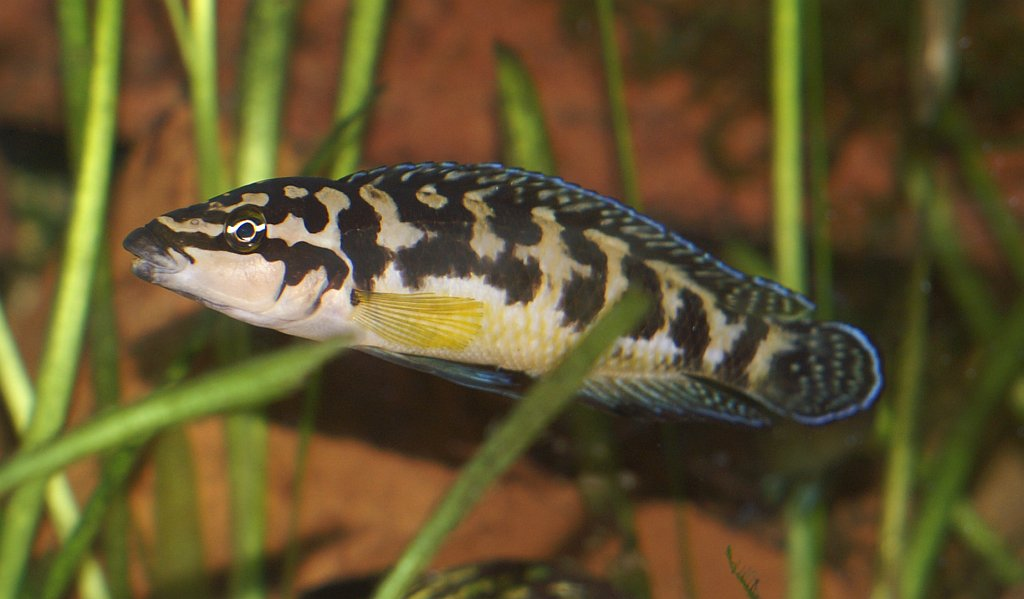

Conservation status
- Critically Endangered (IUCN 3.1)

Scientific classification
- Kingdom: Animalia
- Phylum: Chordata
- Class: Actinopterygii
- Order: Cichliformes
- Family: Cichlidae
- Genus: Julidochromis
- Species: J. transcriptus

Binomial name
- Julidochromis transcriptus Matthes, 1959

= Masked julie =

Species of fish

The masked julie (Julidochromis transcriptus) is a species of cichlid endemic to Lake Tanganyika in Africa where it is found only along the northwestern shore preferring areas with rocky substrates. They eat zooplankton and benthic invertebrates found in the algae growth in the wild. This species reaches a length of 7 centimetres (2.8 in) TL.

== See also ==
- List of freshwater aquarium fish species
