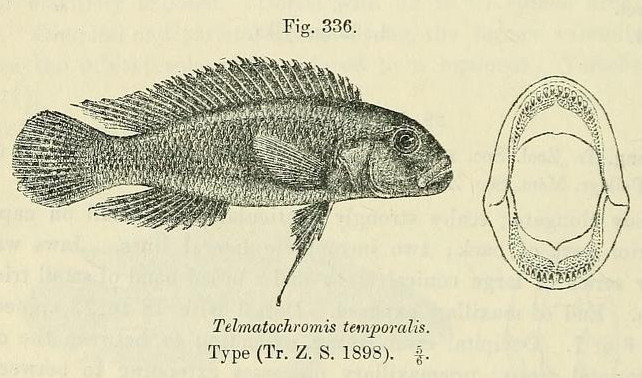

Conservation status
- Least Concern (IUCN 3.1)

Scientific classification
- Kingdom: Animalia
- Phylum: Chordata
- Class: Actinopterygii
- Order: Cichliformes
- Family: Cichlidae
- Genus: Telmatochromis
- Species: T. temporalis

Binomial name
- Telmatochromis temporalis Boulenger, 1898

Synonyms
- Julidochromis macrolepis Borodin, 1931; Lamprologus macrolepis (Borodin, 1931); Telmatochromis lestradei Poll, 1942; Telmatochromis burgeoni Poll, 1942; Perissodus burgeoni (Poll, 1942)

= Telmatochromis temporalis =

Species of fish

Telmatochromis temporalis is a species of cichlid endemic to Lake Tanganyika where they areas with rocky substrates usually at depths of from 5 to 10 metres (16 to 33 ft) though occasionally down to 20 metres (66 ft). This species can reach a length of 10.2 centimetres (4.0 in) TL. It can also be found in the aquarium trade.
