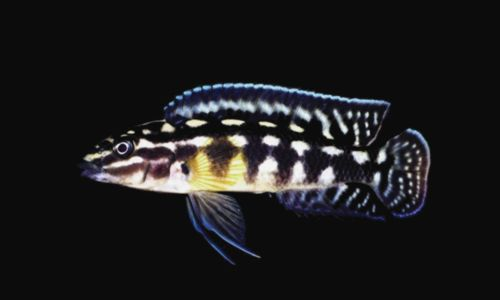

Conservation status
- Least Concern (IUCN 3.1)

Scientific classification
- Kingdom: Animalia
- Phylum: Chordata
- Class: Actinopterygii
- Order: Cichliformes
- Family: Cichlidae
- Genus: Julidochromis
- Species: J. marlieri

Binomial name
- Julidochromis marlieri Poll, 1956

= Julidochromis marlieri =

Species of fish

Julidochromis marlieri is a species of cichlid endemic to Lake Tanganyika where it is only known from the northwestern portion preferring rocky shorelines in deep waters. In the aquarium trade, it is commonly known as Marlier's Julie, Spotted Julie or Chequered Julie. This species reaches a length of 15 centimetres (5.9 in) TL. Adult females are larger than adult males.

== Etymology ==
The specific name honours the Belgian zoologist Georges Marlier who collected the type.

== See also ==
- List of freshwater aquarium fish species
