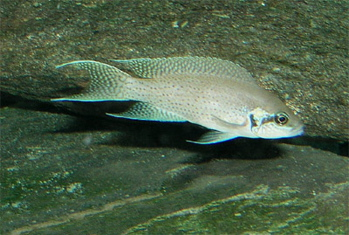
- Neolamprologus brichardi

Scientific classification
- Kingdom: Animalia
- Phylum: Chordata
- Class: Actinopterygii
- Order: Cichliformes
- Family: Cichlidae
- Subfamily: Pseudocrenilabrinae
- Tribe: Lamprologini; Poll, 1986

Genera
- See text

= Lamprologini =

Tribe of fishes

Lamprologini is a tribe of African cichlid fishes. It contains seven genera and nearly 100 species. Over half of the species in this tribe are in the large genus Neolamprologus. Most genera in the tribe are endemic to Lake Tanganyika, but several species of Telmatochromis (esp. T. devosi) can be found from its outflow rivers Malagarasi River in Tanzania and Lukuga River in DRC, and several species of Lamprologus are from the Congo River Basin.

The species in this tribe are very small to medium-sized cichlids, but vary extensively in appearance and habitat preference. Unlike most Tanganyika cichlids which are mouthbrooders, Lamprologini species are substrate spawners (typically using caves or rock crevices), and some are shell dwellers.

== Genera ==
- Altolamprologus (3 species)
- Julidochromis (9 species) inc. Chalinochromis (3 species)
- Lamprologus (9 species)
- Lepidiolamprologus (10 species)
- Neolamprologus (52 species)
- Telmatochromis (9 species)
- Variabilichromis (1 species)
