= Coral =

Corals Temporal range: 535–0 Ma Fortunian–present
- A coral outcrop on the Great Barrier Reef, Australia

Scientific classification
- Kingdom: Animalia
- Phylum: Cnidaria
- Subphylum: Anthozoa; Ehrenberg, 1834

Subdivisions
- Octocorallia; Malacalcyonacea; Scleralcyonacea; Hexacorallia; Scleractinia; Antipatharia; †Rugosa; †Tabulata

Marine invertebrates of the subphylum Anthozoa

Corals are colonial marine invertebrates within the subphylum Anthozoa of the phylum Cnidaria. They typically form compact colonies of many identical individual polyps. Coral species include the important reef builders that inhabit tropical oceans and secrete calcium carbonate to form a hard skeleton.

A coral "group" is a colony of very many genetically identical polyps. Each polyp is a sac-like animal typically only a few millimeters in diameter and a few centimeters in height. A set of tentacles surround a central mouth opening. Each polyp excretes an exoskeleton near the base. Over many generations, the colony thus creates a skeleton characteristic of the species which can measure up to several meters in size. Individual colonies grow by asexual reproduction of polyps. Corals also breed sexually (two parts completing a whole) by spawning: polyps of the same species release gametes simultaneously overnight, often around a full moon. Fertilized eggs form planulae, a mobile early form of the coral polyp which, when mature, settles to form a new colony.

Although some corals are able to catch plankton and small fish using stinging cells on their tentacles, most corals obtain the majority of their energy and nutrients from photosynthesis of symbiotic unicellular dinoflagellates of the genus Symbiodinium, which live within coral tissues. These are commonly known as zooxanthellae and give the coral color. Such corals require sunlight and grow in clear, shallow water, typically at depths less than 60 metres (200 feet; 33 fathoms), but corals in the genus Leptoseris have been found as deep as 172 metres (564 feet; 94 fathoms). Corals are major contributors to the physical structure of the coral reefs that develop in tropical and subtropical waters, such as the Great Barrier Reef off the coast of Australia. These corals are increasingly at risk of bleaching events where polyps expel the zooxanthellae in response to stress such as high water temperature or toxins.

Other corals do not rely on zooxanthellae and can live globally in much deeper water, such as the cold-water genus Lophelia which can survive as deep as 3,300 metres (10,800 feet; 1,800 fathoms). Some have been found as far north as the Darwin Mounds, northwest of Cape Wrath, Scotland, and others off the coast of Washington state and the Aleutian Islands.

== Taxonomy ==
The classification of corals has been discussed for millennia, owing to having similarities to both plants and animals. Aristotle's pupil Theophrastus described the red coral, korallion, in his book on stones, implying it was a mineral, but he described it as a deep-sea plant in his Enquiries on Plants, where he also mentions large stony plants that reveal bright flowers when under water in the Gulf of Heroes. Pliny the Elder stated boldly that several sea creatures including sea nettles and sponges "are neither animals nor plants, but are possessed of a third nature (tertia natura)". Petrus Gyllius copied Pliny, introducing the term zoophyta for this third group in his 1535 book On the French and Latin Names of the Fishes of the Marseilles Region; it is popularly but wrongly supposed that Aristotle created the term. Gyllius further noted, following Aristotle, how hard it was to define what was a plant and what was an animal. The Babylonian Talmud refers to coral among a list of types of trees, and the 11th-century French commentator Rashi describes it as "a type of tree (מין עץ) that grows underwater that goes by the (French) name 'coral'."

The Persian polymath Al-Biruni (d.1048) classified sponges and corals as animals, arguing that they respond to touch. Nevertheless, people believed corals to be plants until the eighteenth century when William Herschel used a microscope to establish that coral had the characteristic thin cell membranes of an animal.

Presently, corals are classified as species of animals within the sub-classes Hexacorallia and Octocorallia of the class Anthozoa in the phylum Cnidaria. Hexacorallia includes the stony corals and these groups have polyps that generally have a 6-fold symmetry. Octocorallia includes blue coral and soft corals. Species of Octocorallia have polyps with an eightfold symmetry, with each polyp having eight tentacles and eight mesenteries. The group of corals is paraphyletic because the sea anemones are also in the sub-class Hexacorallia.

== Systematic ==
There are two main classifications for corals: hard coral (scleractinian and stony coral) which form reefs by a calcium carbonate base, with polyps that bear six stiff tentacles, and soft coral (Alcyonacea and ahermatypic coral) which are pliable and formed by a colony of polyps with eight feather-like tentacles. These two classifications arose from differentiation in gene expressions in their branch tips and bases that arose through developmental signaling pathways such as Hox, Hedgehog, Wnt, and BMP.

Scientists typically select Acropora as research models since they are the most diverse genus of hard coral, having over 120 species. Most species within this genus have polyps which are dimorphic: axial polyps grow rapidly and have lighter coloration, while radial polyps are small and are darker in coloration. In the Acropora genus, gamete synthesis and photosynthesis occur at the basal polyps, growth occurs mainly at the radial polyps. Growth at the site of the radial polyps encompasses two processes: asexual reproduction via mitosis, and skeleton deposition of the calcium carbonate via extracellular matrix (ECM) proteins acting as differentially expressed (DE) signaling genes between both branch tips and bases. These processes lead to colony differentiation, which is the most accurate distinguisher between coral species. In the Acropora genus, colony differentiation through up-regulation and down-regulation of DEs.

Systematic studies of soft coral species have faced challenges due to a lack of taxonomic knowledge. Researchers have not found enough variability within the genus to confidently delineate similar species, due to a low rate in mutation of mitochondrial DNA.

Environmental factors, such as the rise of temperatures and acid levels in our oceans account for some speciation of corals in the form of species lost. Various coral species have heat shock proteins (HSP) that are also in the category of DE across species. These HSPs help corals combat the increased temperatures they are facing which lead to protein denaturing, growth loss, and eventually coral death. Approximately 33% of coral species are on the International Union for Conservation of Nature's endangered species list and at risk of species loss. Ocean acidification (falling pH levels in the oceans) is threatening the continued species growth and differentiation of corals. Mutation rates of Vibrio shilonii, the reef pathogen responsible for coral bleaching, heavily outweigh the typical reproduction rates of coral colonies when pH levels fall. Thus, corals are unable to mutate their HSPs and other climate change preventative genes to combat the increase in temperature and decrease in pH at a competitive rate to these pathogens responsible for coral bleaching, resulting in species loss.

== Anatomy ==
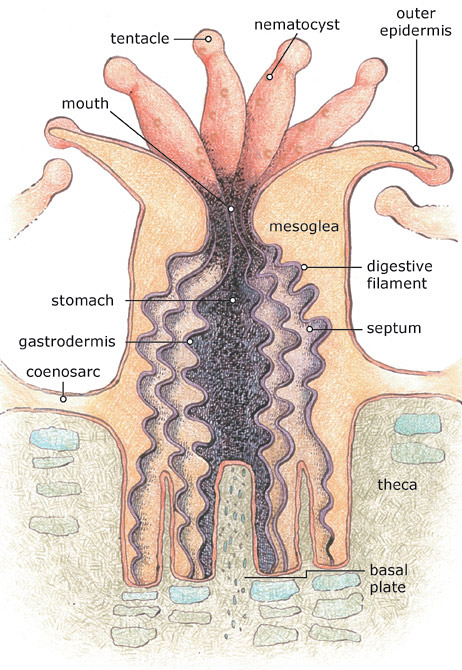
Anatomy of a stony coral polyp

For most of their life corals are sessile animals of colonies of genetically identical polyps. Each polyp varies from millimeters to centimeters in diameter, and colonies can be formed from many millions of individual polyps. Stony coral (also known as hard coral) polyps produce a skeleton composed of calcium carbonate to strengthen and protect the organism. This is deposited by the polyps and by the coenosarc, the living tissue that connects them. The polyps sit in cup-shaped depressions in the skeleton known as corallites. Colonies of stony coral are markedly variable in appearance; a single species may adopt an encrusting, plate-like, bushy, columnar or massive solid structure, the various forms often being linked to different types of habitat, with variations in light level and water movement being significant.

The body of the polyp may be roughly compared in a structure to a sac, the wall of which is composed of two layers of cells. The outer layer is known technically as the ectoderm, the inner layer as the endoderm. Between ectoderm and endoderm is a supporting layer of gelatinous substance termed mesoglea, secreted by the cell layers of the body wall. The mesoglea can contain skeletal elements derived from cells migrated from the ectoderm.

The sac-like body built up in this way is attached to a hard surface, which in hard corals are cup-shaped depressions in the skeleton known as corallites. At the center of the upper end of the sac lies the only opening called the mouth, surrounded by a circle of tentacles which resemble glove fingers. The tentacles are organs which serve both for tactile sense and for the capture of food. Polyps extend their tentacles, particularly at night, often containing coiled stinging cells (cnidocytes) which pierce, poison and firmly hold living prey paralyzing or killing them. Polyp prey includes plankton such as copepods and fish larvae. Longitudinal muscular fibers formed from the cells of the ectoderm allow tentacles to contract to convey the food to the mouth. Similarly, circularly disposed muscular fibers formed from the endoderm permit tentacles to be protracted or thrust out once they are contracted. In both stony and soft corals, the polyps can be retracted by contracting muscle fibers, with stony corals relying on their hard skeleton and cnidocytes for defense. Soft corals generally secrete terpenoid toxins to ward off predators.

In most corals, the tentacles are retracted by day and spread out at night to catch plankton and other small organisms. Shallow-water species of both stony and soft corals can have zooxanthellate, the corals supplementing their plankton diet with the products of photosynthesis produced by these symbionts. The polyps interconnect by a complex and well-developed system of gastrovascular canals, allowing significant sharing of nutrients and symbionts.

The external form of the polyp varies greatly. The column may be long and slender, or may be so short in the axial direction that the body becomes disk-like. The tentacles may number many hundreds or may be very few, in rare cases only one or two. They may be simple and unbranched, or feathery in pattern. The mouth may be level with the surface of the peristome, or may be projecting and trumpet-shaped.

=== Soft corals ===
Soft corals have no solid exoskeleton as such. However, their tissues are often reinforced by small supportive elements known as sclerites made of calcium carbonate. The polyps of soft corals have eight-fold symmetry, which is reflected in the Octo in Octocorallia.

Soft corals vary considerably in form, and most are colonial. A few soft corals are stolonate, but the polyps of most are connected by sheets of tissue called coenosarc, and in some species these sheets are thick and the polyps deeply embedded in them. Some soft corals encrust other sea objects or form lobes. Others are tree-like or whip-like and have a central axial skeleton embedded at their base in the matrix of the supporting branch. These branches are composed of a fibrous protein called gorgonin or of a calcified material.

=== Stony corals ===
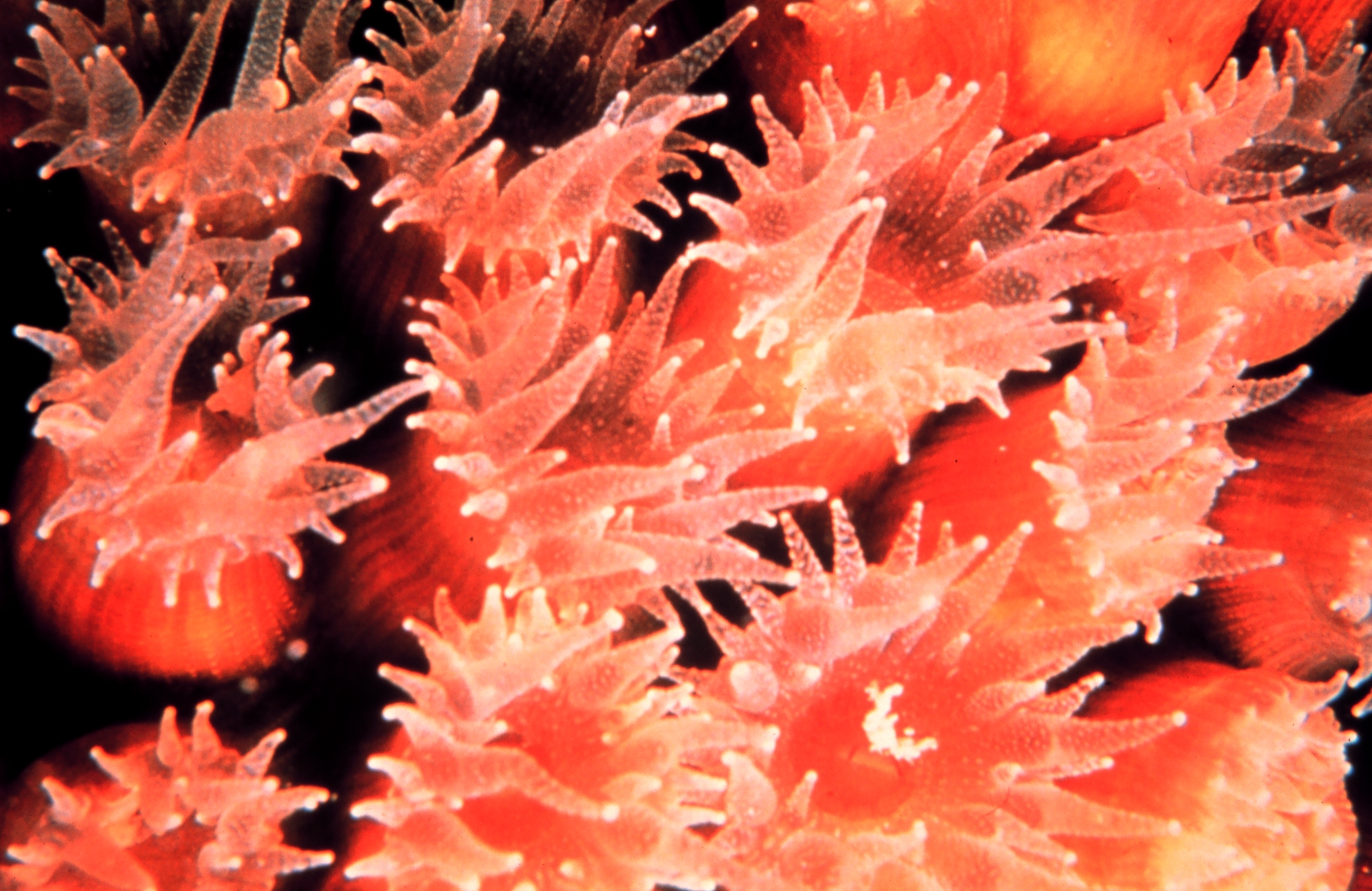
Montastraea cavernosa polyps with tentacles extended

The polyps of stony corals have six-fold symmetry. In stony corals, the tentacles are cylindrical and taper to a point, but in soft corals they are pinnate with side branches known as pinnules. In some tropical species, these are reduced to mere stubs and in some, they are fused to give a paddle-like appearance.

Coral skeletons are biocomposites (mineral + organics) of calcium carbonate, in the form of calcite or aragonite. In scleractinian corals, "centers of calcification" and fibers are clearly distinct structures differing with respect to both morphology and chemical compositions of the crystalline units. The organic matrices extracted from diverse species are acidic, and comprise proteins, sulphated sugars and lipids; they are species specific. The soluble organic matrices of the skeletons allow to differentiate zooxanthellae and non-zooxanthellae specimens.

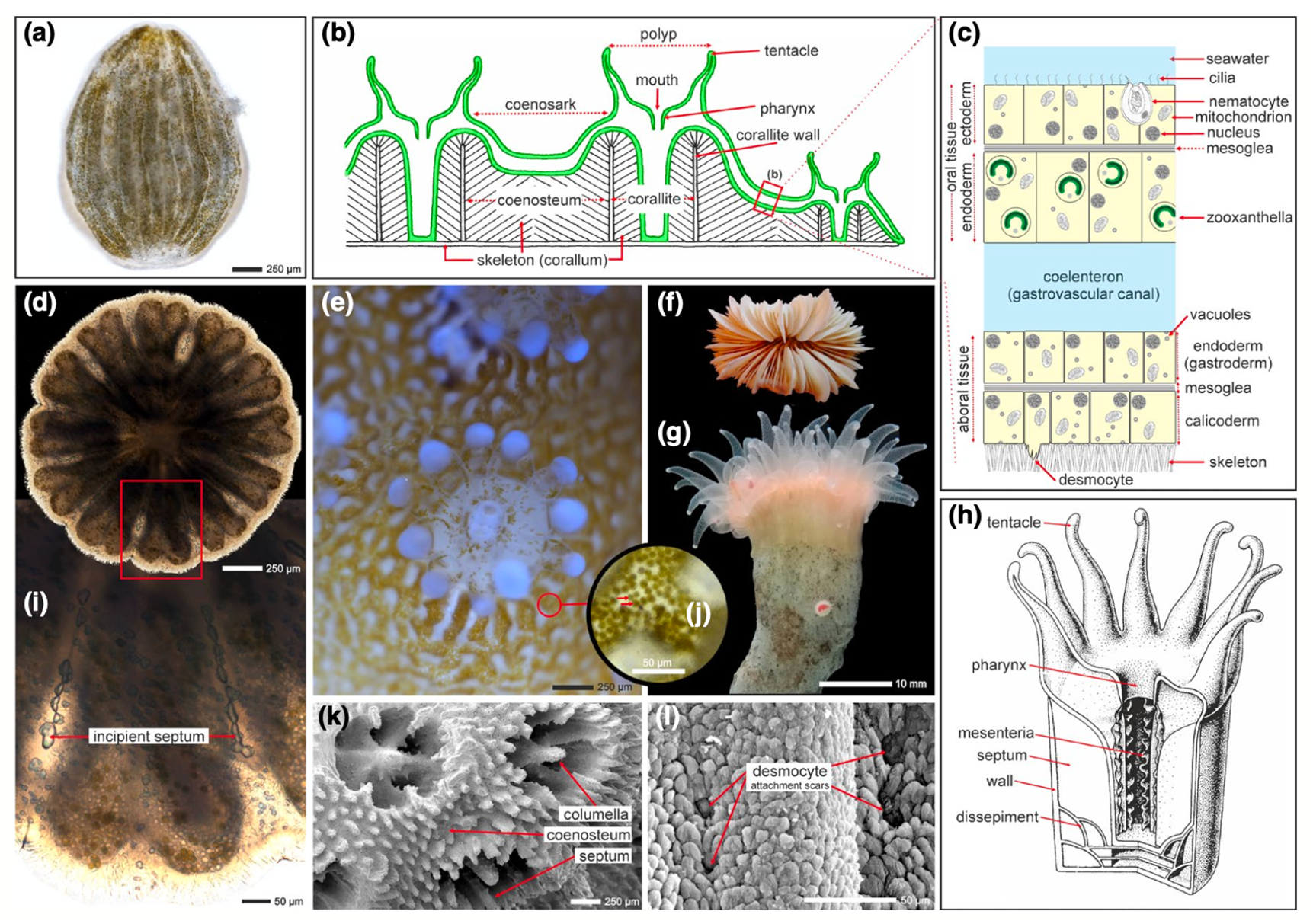
The general organization of the scleractinian coral soft tissue and underlying skeleton

Specifically, calcification in corals takes place within specialized vesicles inside cells or at the interface between the calicoblastic ectoderm and the growing skeleton. This process is precisely regulated to control the formation and orientation of calcium carbonate crystals. The Skeletal Organic Matrix (SOM), primarily composed of proteins secreted by the calicoblastic ectoderm, plays a central role in this regulation. Among these proteins, CARPs (coral acid-rich proteins) and SAPs (skeletal aspartic acid-rich proteins) facilitate the transport of calcium ions (Ca^{2+}) toward the calcifying space. Importantly, carbonate precipitation in the calicoblastic space is not solely governed by the aragonite saturation state ($\Omega_{arag}$); rather, it depends on the orchestrated activity of SOM components. The distinct spatial distribution of these proteins—observed both on coral skeletons and in coral cell cultures—underscores their specific and diverse roles in directing crystal nucleation, growth, and overall skeletal architecture.

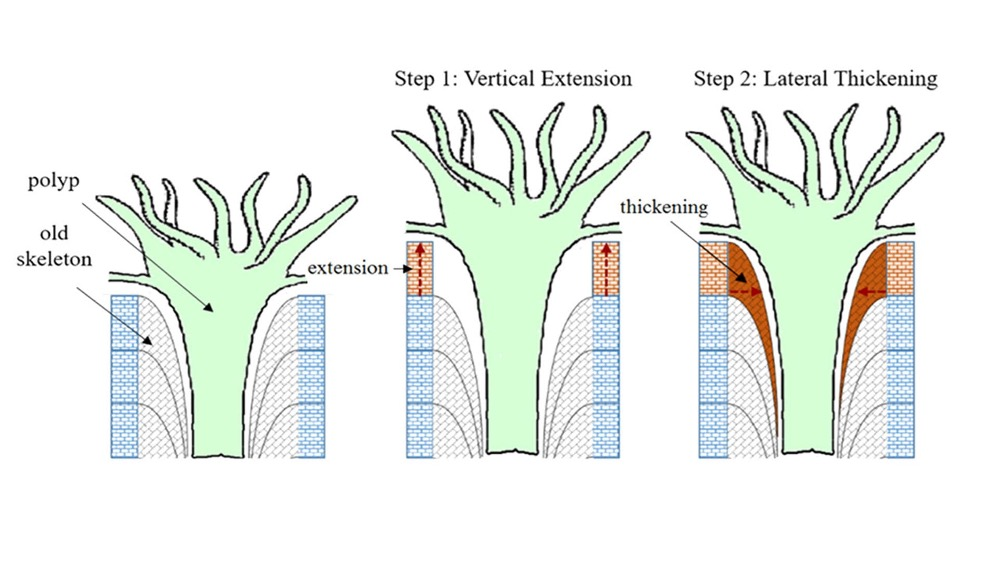
Coral skeleton formation

The enzyme α-carbonic anhydrase (CA) plays a vital role in regulating inorganic carbon balance within coral cells. It catalyzes two reversible reactions: the hydration of carbon dioxide (CO_{2}) into bicarbonate (HCO^{−}_{3}) and a proton (H^{+}), and the dehydration of bicarbonate back into CO_{2} and a proton. Through these interconversions, α-carbonic anhydrase facilitates the efficient transport and supply of dissolved inorganic carbon for both photosynthesis and calcification, maintaining the delicate equilibrium between CO_{2} and bicarbonate required for coral metabolic and skeletal processes.

Ocean acidification poses a major threat to coral calcification by reducing the availability of carbonate ions (CO^{2−}_{3}), which are essential for forming calcium carbonate (CaCO_{3}) skeletons. Under increasingly acidified conditions, corals must expend more energy to pump protons (H^{+}) out of the calcifying space in order to maintain favorable conditions for mineral deposition. This heightened energetic demand compromises coral growth and skeletal density, resulting in weaker and more brittle structures. Consequently, coral reefs become more susceptible to physical damage from waves and storms, as well as less resilient to other environmental stressors.

== Ecology ==
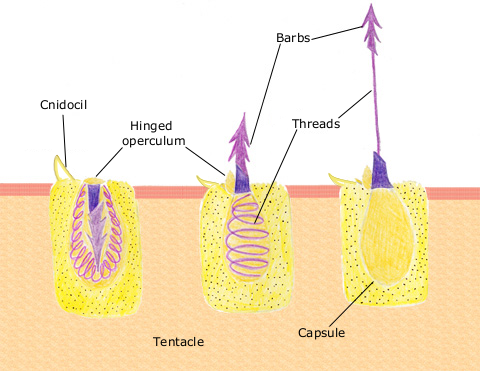
Discharge mechanism of a stinging cell (nematocyst)

=== Feeding ===
Polyps feed on a variety of small organisms, from microscopic zooplankton to small fish. The polyp's tentacles immobilize or kill prey using stinging cells called cnidocytes, commonly called nematocysts. These cells carry venom which they rapidly release in response to contact with another organism. A dormant nematocyst discharges in response to nearby prey touching the trigger. A stiff flap called an operculum opens and its stinging apparatus fires the barb into the prey. The venom is injected through the hollow filament to immobilise the prey; the tentacles then manoeuvre the prey into the stomach. Once the prey is digested the stomach reopens allowing the elimination of waste products and the beginning of the next hunting cycle.

=== Intracellular symbionts ===
Many corals, as well as other cnidarian groups such as sea anemones form a symbiotic relationship with a class of dinoflagellate algae, zooxanthellae of the genus Symbiodinium, which can form as much as 30% of the tissue of a polyp. Typically, each polyp harbors one species of alga, and coral species show a preference for Symbiodinium. Young corals are not born with zooxanthellae, but acquire the algae from the surrounding environment, including the water column and local sediment. The main benefit of the zooxanthellae is their ability to photosynthesize which supplies corals with the products of photosynthesis, including glucose, glycerol, also amino acids, which the corals can use for energy. Zooxanthellae also benefit corals by aiding in calcification, for the coral skeleton, and waste removal. In addition to the soft tissue, microbiomes are also found in the coral's mucus and (in stony corals) the skeleton, with the latter showing the greatest microbial richness.

The zooxanthellae benefit from a safe place to live and consume the polyp's carbon dioxide, phosphate and nitrogenous waste. Stressed corals will eject their zooxanthellae, a process that is becoming increasingly common due to strain placed on coral by rising ocean temperatures. Mass ejections are known as coral bleaching because the algae contribute to coral coloration; some colors, however, are due to host coral pigments, such as green fluorescent proteins (GFPs). Ejection increases the polyp's chance of surviving short-term stress and if the stress subsides they can regain their algae. Sometimes, instead of regaining the same algal species, they will switch out their heat intolerant microalgal symbiont for a more heat tolerant species as a response to rising ocean temperatures. Unfortunately, heat-stress tolerant algae may not always be available or accepted by the coral host. If the stressful conditions persist, the polyp eventually dies. Zooxanthellae are located within the coral cytoplasm and due to the algae's photosynthetic activity the internal pH of the coral can be raised; this behavior indicates that the zooxanthellae are responsible to some extent for the metabolism of their host corals. Stony Coral Tissue Loss Disease has been associated with the breakdown of host-zooxanthellae physiology. Moreover, Vibrio bacterium are known to have virulence traits used for host coral tissue damage and photoinhibition of algal symbionts. Therefore, both coral and their symbiotic microorganisms could have evolved to harbour traits resistant to disease and transmission.

=== Coral metabolic plasticity ===
Coral metabolic plasticity is the ability of corals to change how they get and use energy when conditions around them change. Reef-building corals get energy in two ways: from tiny algae living in their tissue (Symbiodinium), which use sunlight to make sugars for the coral, and from catching plankton and absorbing dissolved food from seawater. In bright, shallow water the algae can supply most or even all of a coral’s daily energy needs. During marine heatwaves, corals can lose their algae in a process called bleaching, and some species cope by eating much more. In one Hawaiian experiment, bleached Montipora capitata corals met more than 100% of their daily energy needs from food, while two Porites species did not. Corals can also use up stored fats, sugars, and proteins while their algae are missing, although how much they use differs between species. Because corals that can switch to feeding may be more likely to recover from bleaching, scientists study this ability to help predict which reefs may survive warming oceans. The evidence is not always consistent, though: a field study in Hawaii found no sign of extra feeding in bleached colonies of two species.

== Reproduction ==
Corals can be both gonochoristic (unisexual) and hermaphroditic, each of which can reproduce sexually and asexually. Reproduction also allows coral to settle in new areas. Reproduction is coordinated by chemical communication.

=== Sexual ===
Life cycles of broadcasters and brooders

Corals predominantly reproduce sexually. About 25% of hermatypic corals (reef-building stony corals) form single-sex (gonochoristic) colonies, while the rest are hermaphroditic. It is estimated more than 67% of coral are simultaneous hermaphrodites.

==== Broadcasters ====
External videos
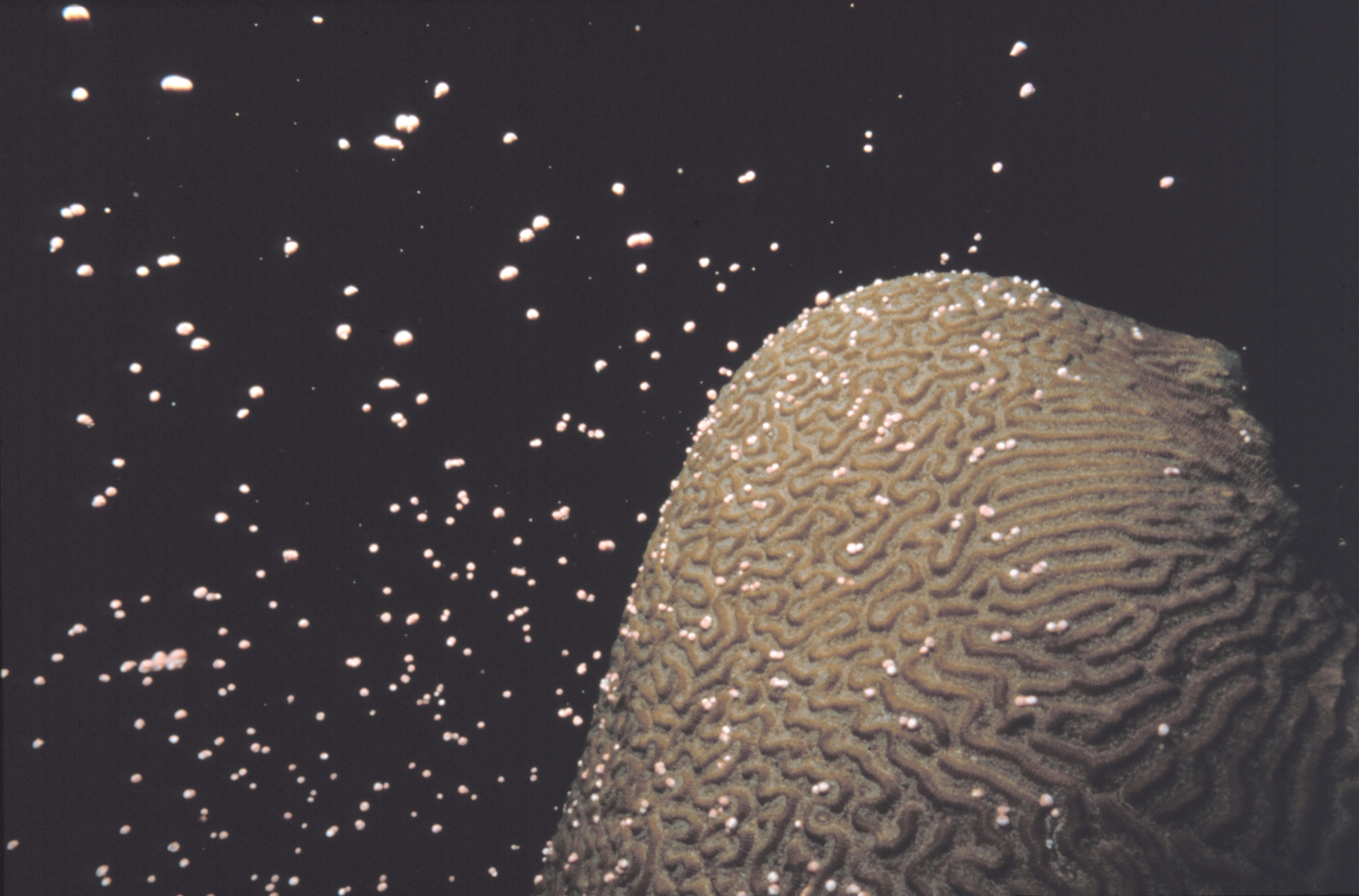
- " Out of Tune – Breakdown of Coral Spawning Synchrony", Tom Shlesinger, Sep 5, 2019

About 75% of all hermatypic corals "broadcast spawn" by releasing gametes—eggs and sperm—into the water where they meet and fertilize to spread offspring. Corals often synchronize their time of spawning. This reproductive synchrony is essential so that male and female gametes can meet. Spawning frequently takes place in the evening or at night, and can occur as infrequently as once a year, and within a window of 10–30 minutes. Synchronous spawning is very typical on the coral reef, and often, all corals spawn on the same night even when multiple species are present. Synchronous spawning may form hybrids and is perhaps involved in coral speciation.

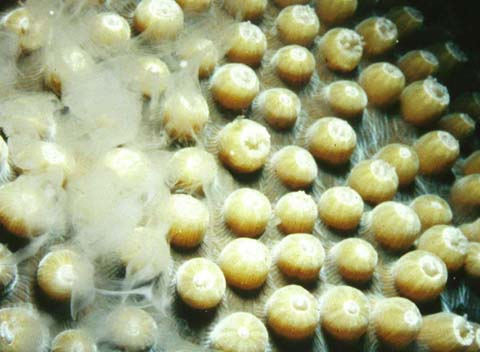
A male great star coral, Montastraea cavernosa, releasing sperm into the water

Environmental cues that influence the release of gametes into the water vary from species to species. The cues involve temperature change, lunar cycle, day length, and possibly chemical signalling. Other factors that affect the rhythmicity of organisms in marine habitats include salinity, mechanical forces, and pressure or magnetic field changes.

Mass coral spawning often occurs at night on days following a full moon. A full moon is equivalent to four to six hours of continuous dim light exposure, which can cause light-dependent reactions in protein. Corals contain light-sensitive cryptochromes, proteins whose light-absorbing flavin structures are sensitive to different types of light. This allows corals such as Dipsastraea speciosa to detect and respond to changes in sunlight and moonlight.

Moonlight itself may actually suppress coral spawning. The most immediate cue to cause spawning appears to be the dark portion of the night between sunset and moonrise. Over the lunar cycle, moonrise shifts progressively later, occurring after sunset on the day of the full moon. The resulting dark period between day-light and night-light removes the suppressive effect of moonlight and enables coral to spawn.

The spawning event can be visually dramatic, clouding the usually clear water with gametes. Once released, gametes fertilize at the water's surface and form a microscopic larva called a planula, typically pink and elliptical in shape. A typical coral colony needs to release several thousand larvae per year to overcome the odds against formation of a new colony.

Studies suggest that light pollution desynchronizes spawning in some coral species. In areas such as the Red Sea, as many as 10 out of 50 species may be showing spawning asynchrony, compared to 30 years ago. The establishment of new corals in the area has decreased and in some cases ceased. The area was previously considered a refuge for corals because mass bleaching events due to climate change had not been observed there. Coral restoration techniques for coral reef management are being developed to increase fertilization rates, larval development, and settlement of new corals.

==== Brooders ====
Brooding species are most often ahermatypic (not reef-building) in areas of high current or wave action. Brooders release only sperm, which is negatively buoyant, sinking onto the waiting egg carriers that harbor unfertilized eggs for weeks. Synchronous spawning events sometimes occur even with these species. After fertilization, the corals release planula that are ready to settle.

Generalized life cycle of corals via sexual reproduction: Colonies release gametes in clusters (1) which float to the surface (2) then disperse and fertilize eggs (3). Embryos become planulae (4) and can settle onto a surface (5). They then metamorphose into a juvenile polyp (6) which then matures and reproduces asexually to form a colony (7, 8).

==== Planulae ====
The time from spawning to larval settlement is usually two to three days but can occur immediately or up to two months. Broadcast-spawned planula larvae develop at the water's surface before descending to seek a hard surface on the benthos to which they can attach and begin a new colony. The larvae often need a biological cue to induce settlement such as specific crustose coralline algae species or microbial biofilms. High failure rates afflict many stages of this process, and even though thousands of eggs are released by each colony, few new colonies form. During settlement, larvae are inhibited by physical barriers such as sediment, as well as chemical (allelopathic) barriers. The larvae metamorphose into a single polyp and eventually develops into a juvenile and then adult by asexual budding and growth.

=== Asexual ===
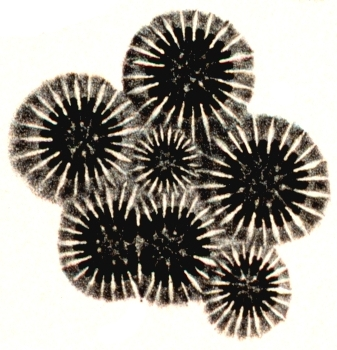
Basal plates (calices) of Orbicella annularis showing multiplication by budding (small central plate) and division (large double plate)

Within a coral head, the genetically identical polyps reproduce asexually, either by budding (gemmation) or by dividing, whether longitudinally or transversely.

Budding involves splitting a smaller polyp from an adult. As the new polyp grows, it forms its body parts. The distance between the new and adult polyps grows, and with it, the coenosarc (the common body of the colony). Budding can be intratentacular, from its oral discs, producing same-sized polyps within the ring of tentacles, or extratentacular, from its base, producing a smaller polyp.

Division forms two polyps that each become as large as the original. Longitudinal division begins when a polyp broadens and then divides its coelenteron (body), effectively splitting along its length. The mouth divides and new tentacles form. The two polyps thus created then generate their missing body parts and exoskeleton. Transversal division occurs when polyps and the exoskeleton divide transversally into two parts. This means one has the basal disc (bottom) and the other has the oral disc (top); the new polyps must separately generate the missing pieces.

Asexual reproduction offers the benefits of high reproductive rate, delaying senescence, and replacement of dead modules, as well as geographical distribution.

=== Colony division ===
Whole colonies can reproduce asexually, forming two colonies with the same genotype. The possible mechanisms include fission, bailout and fragmentation. Fission occurs in some corals, especially among the family Fungiidae, where the colony splits into two or more colonies during early developmental stages. Bailout occurs when a single polyp abandons the colony and settles on a different substrate to create a new colony. Fragmentation involves individuals broken from the colony during storms or other disruptions. The separated individuals can start new colonies.

== Coral microbiomes ==
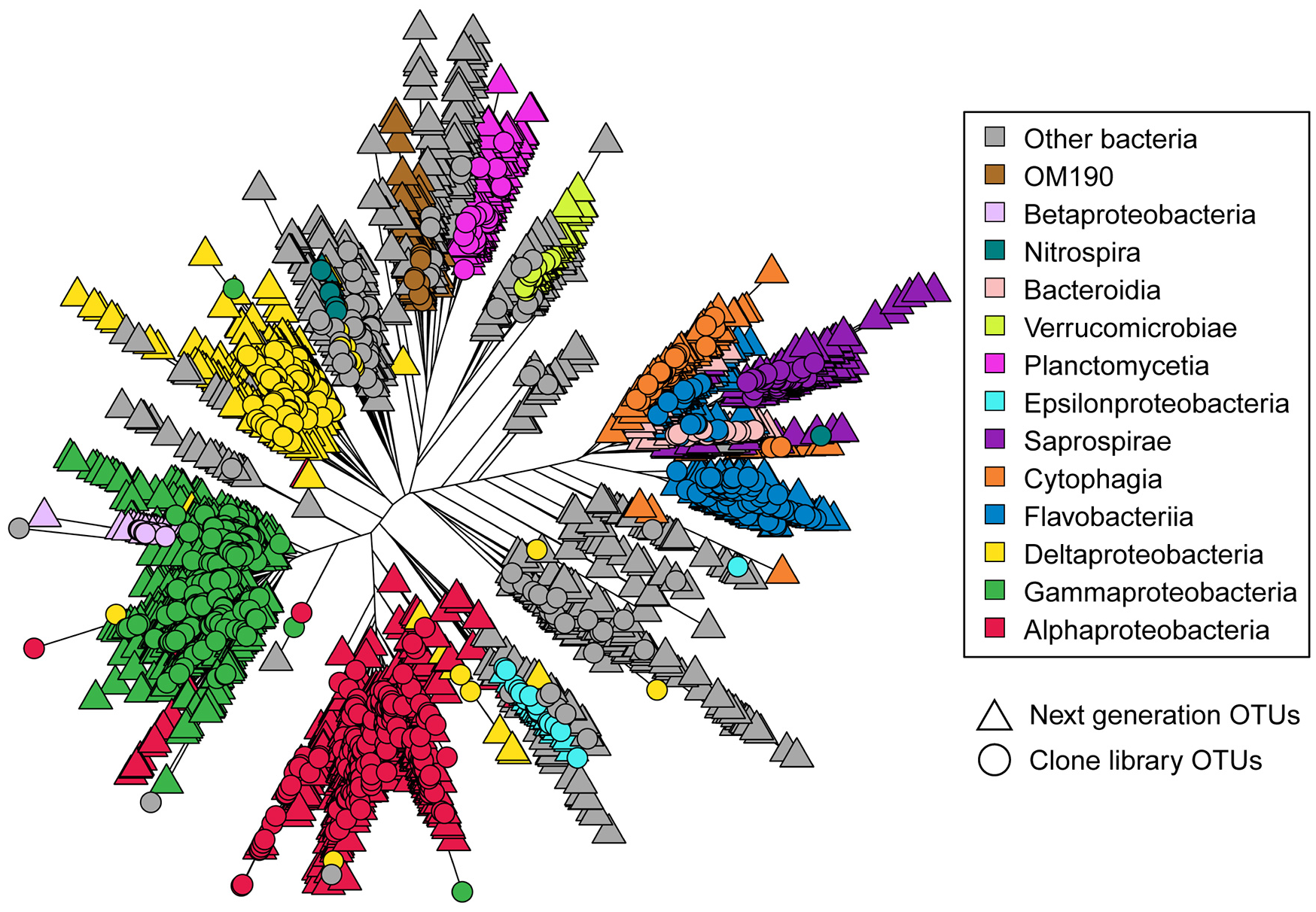
Phylogenetic tree representing bacterial operational taxonomic units (OTUs) from clone libraries and next-generation sequencing. OTUs from next-generation sequencing are displayed if the OTU contained more than two sequences in the unrarefied OTU table (3626 OTUs).

Corals are one of the more common examples of an animal host whose symbiosis with microalgae can turn to dysbiosis, and is visibly detected as bleaching. Coral microbiomes have been examined in a variety of studies, which demonstrate how oceanic environmental variations, most notably temperature, light, and inorganic nutrients, affect the abundance and performance of the microalgal symbionts, as well as calcification and physiology of the host.

Studies have also suggested that resident bacteria, archaea, and fungi additionally contribute to nutrient and organic matter cycling within the coral, with viruses also possibly playing a role in structuring the composition of these members, thus providing one of the first glimpses at a multi-domain marine animal symbiosis. The gammaproteobacterium Endozoicomonas is emerging as a central member of the coral's microbiome, with flexibility in its lifestyle. Given the recent mass bleaching occurring on reefs, corals will likely continue to be a useful and popular system for symbiosis and dysbiosis research.

Astrangia poculata, the northern star coral, is a temperate stony coral, widely documented along the eastern coast of the United States. The coral can live with and without zooxanthellae (algal symbionts), making it an ideal model organism to study microbial community interactions associated with symbiotic state. However, the ability to develop primers and probes to more specifically target key microbial groups has been hindered by the lack of full-length 16S rRNA sequences, since sequences produced by the Illumina platform are of insufficient length (approximately 250 base pairs) for the design of primers and probes. In 2019, Goldsmith et al. demonstrated Sanger sequencing was capable of reproducing the biologically relevant diversity detected by deeper next-generation sequencing, while also producing longer sequences useful to the research community for probe and primer design (see diagram on right).

=== Holobionts ===
Reef-building corals are well-studied holobionts that include the coral itself together with its symbiont zooxanthellae (photosynthetic dinoflagellates), as well as its associated bacteria and viruses. Co-evolutionary patterns exist for coral microbial communities and coral phylogeny.

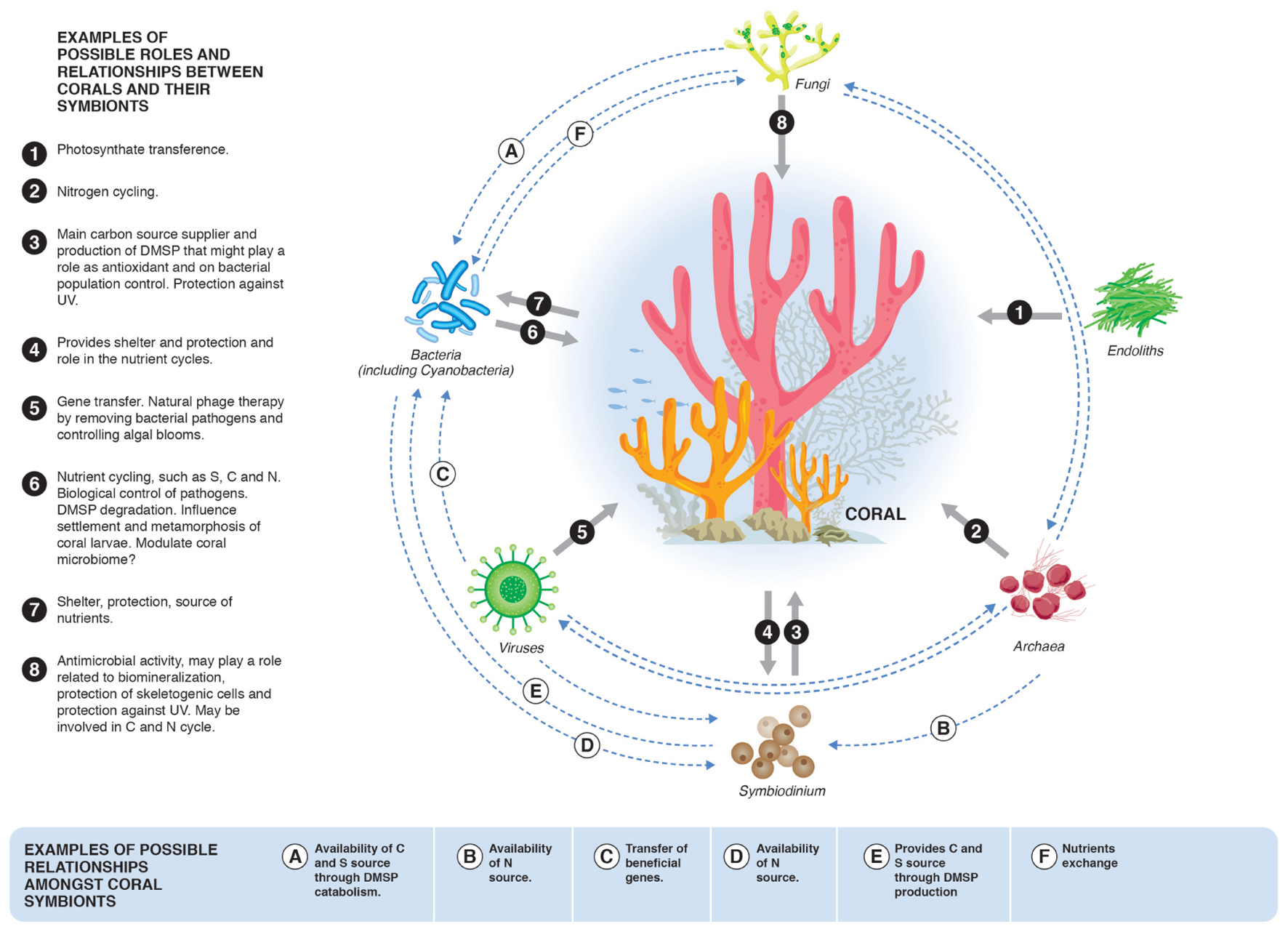
Relationships between corals and their microbial symbionts

It is known that the coral's microbiome and symbiont influence host health, however, the historic influence of each member on others is not well understood. Scleractinian corals have been diversifying for longer than many other symbiotic systems, and their microbiomes are known to be partially species-specific. It has been suggested that Endozoicomonas, a commonly highly abundant bacterium in corals, has exhibited codiversification with its host. This hints at an intricate set of relationships between the members of the coral holobiont that have been developing as evolution of these members occurs.

A study published in 2018 revealed evidence of phylosymbiosis between corals and their tissue and skeleton microbiomes. The coral skeleton, which represents the most diverse of the three coral microbiomes, showed the strongest evidence of phylosymbiosis. Coral microbiome composition and richness were found to reflect coral phylogeny. For example, interactions between bacterial and eukaryotic coral phylogeny influence the abundance of Endozoicomonas, a highly abundant bacterium in the coral holobiont. However, host-microbial cophylogeny appears to influence only a subset of coral-associated bacteria.

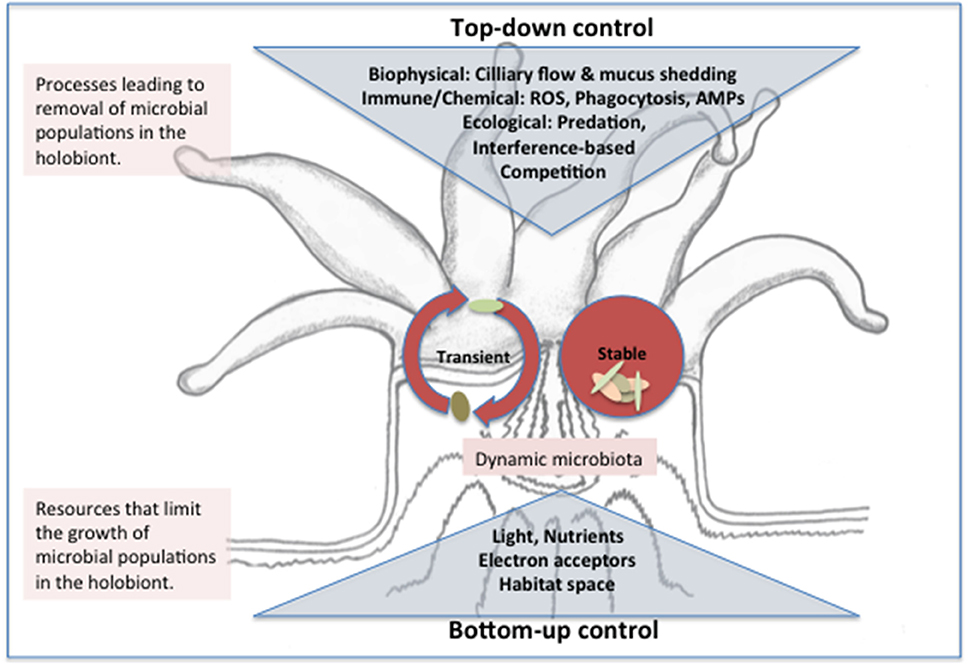
Top-down and bottom-up control of microbiota structure in the coral holobiont Stable microbes may be introduced to the holobiont through horizontal or vertical transmission and persist in ecological niches within the coral polyp where growth (or immigration) rates balance removal pressures from biophysical processes and immune or ecological interactions. Transient microbes enter the holobiont from environmental sources (e.g., seawater, prey items, or suspension feeding) and removal rates exceed growth/immigration rates such that a dynamic and high-diversity microbiota results. Transient and stable populations compete for resources including nutrients, light and space and the outcome of resource-based competition (bottom-up control) ultimately determines population growth rate and thus ability to persist when subject to removal. Whether a population is categorized as stable or transient may depend on the timeframe considered. AMP = antimicrobial peptides, ROS = reactive oxygen species

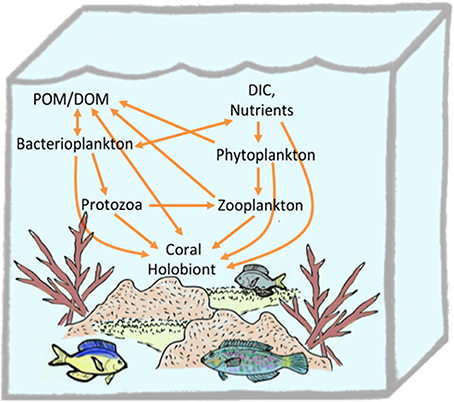
Trophic connections of the coral holobiont in the planktonic food web

== Reefs ==
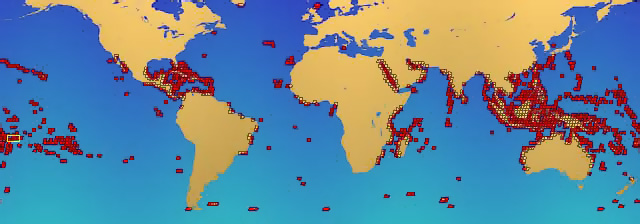
Locations of coral reefs around the world

Many corals in the order Scleractinia are hermatypic, meaning that they are involved in building reefs. Most such corals obtain some of their energy from zooxanthellae in the genus Symbiodinium. These are symbiotic photosynthetic dinoflagellates which require sunlight; reef-forming corals are therefore found mainly in shallow water. They secrete calcium carbonate to form hard skeletons that become the framework of the reef. However, not all reef-building corals in shallow water contain zooxanthellae, and some deep water species, living at depths to which light cannot penetrate, form reefs but do not harbour the symbionts.

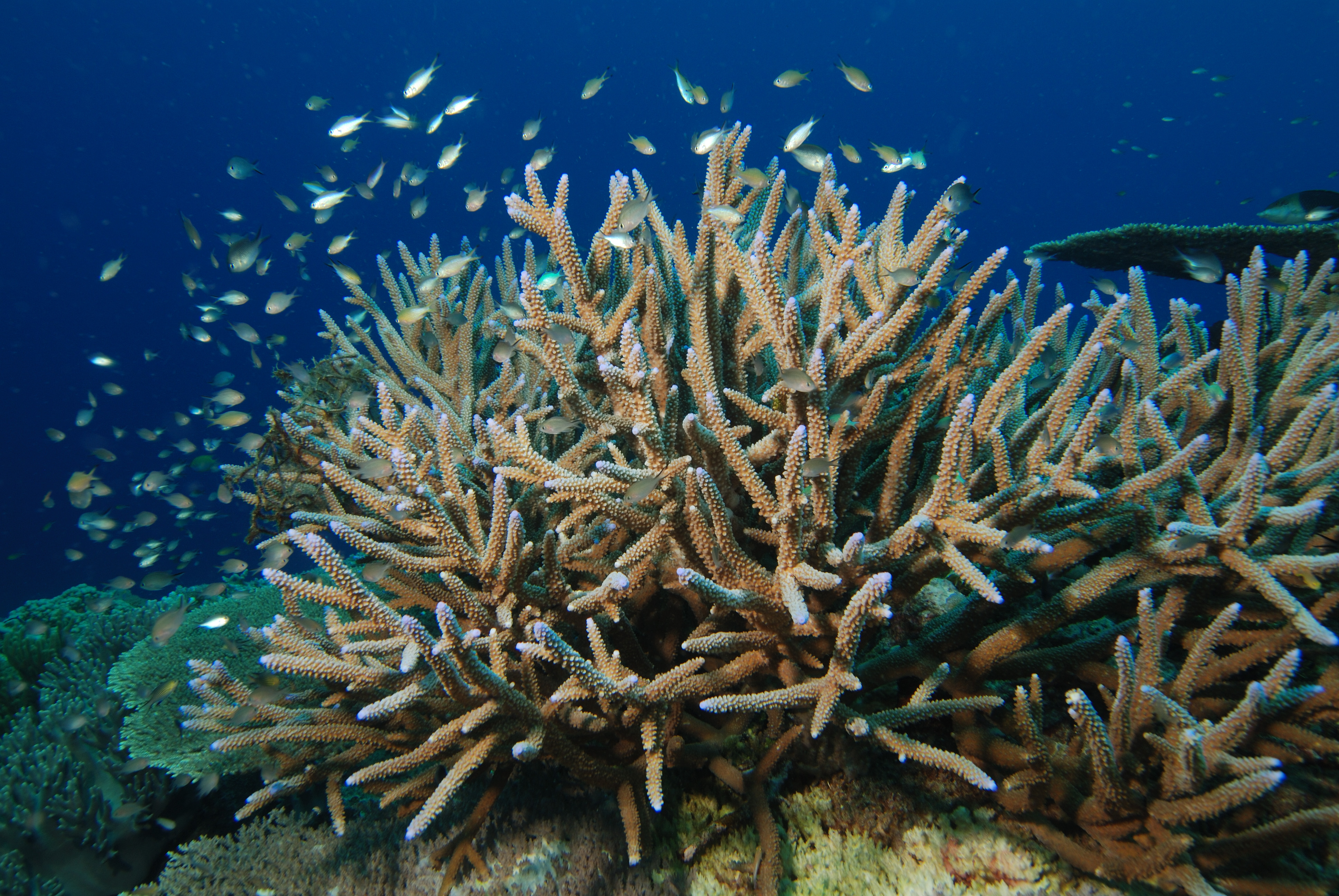
Staghorn coral (Acropora cervicornis) is an important hermatypic coral from the Caribbean.

There are various types of shallow-water coral reef, including fringing reefs, barrier reefs and atolls; most occur in tropical and subtropical seas. They are very slow-growing, adding perhaps one centimetre (0.4 in) in height each year. The Great Barrier Reef is thought to have been laid down about two million years ago. Over time, corals fragment and die, sand and rubble accumulates between the corals, and the shells of clams and other molluscs decay to form a gradually evolving calcium carbonate structure. Coral reefs are extremely diverse marine ecosystems hosting over 4,000 species of fish, massive numbers of cnidarians, molluscs, crustaceans, and many other animals.

== Evolution ==
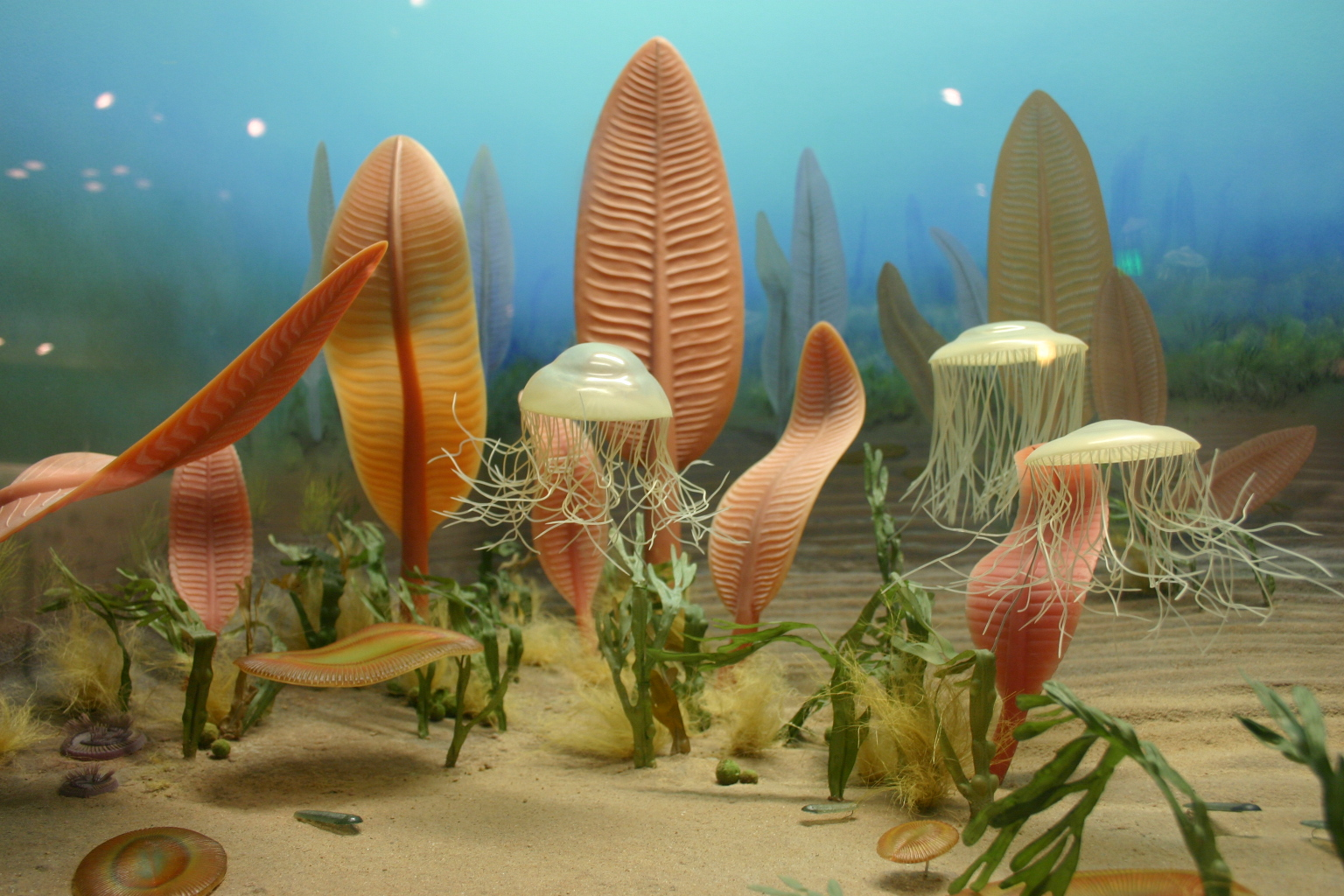
Artist's depiction of life on the ocean floor as it may have appeared prior to the evolution of corals – Smithsonian Institution

At certain times in the geological past, reef-building organisms similar to corals were very abundant. Like modern corals, these ancient organisms built reefs, some of which ended as great structures in sedimentary rocks. Fossils of fellow reef-dwellers algae, sponges, and the remains of many echinoids, brachiopods, bivalves, gastropods, and trilobites appear along with coral fossils. This makes some corals useful index fossils. Coral fossils are not restricted to reef remnants, and many solitary fossils are found elsewhere, such as Cyclocyathus, which occurs in England's Gault clay formation.

=== Early corals ===
Reef-building organisms similar to modern corals first appeared in the Cambrian about 535 million years ago. Fossils are extremely rare until the Ordovician period, 100 million years later, when Heliolitida, rugose, and tabulate corals became widespread. Paleozoic corals often contained numerous endobiotic symbionts.

Tabulate corals occur in limestones and calcareous shales of the Ordovician period, with a gap in the fossil record due to extinction events at the end of the Ordovician. Corals reappeared some millions of years later during the Silurian period, and tabulate corals often form low cushions or branching masses of calcite alongside rugose corals. Tabulate coral numbers began to decline during the middle of the Silurian period.

Rugose or horn corals became dominant by the middle of the Silurian period, and during the Devonian, corals flourished with more than 200 genera. The rugose corals existed in solitary and colonial forms, and were also composed of calcite. Both rugose and tabulate corals became extinct in the Permian–Triassic extinction event 250 million years ago (along with 85% of marine species), and there is a gap of tens of millions of years until new forms of coral evolved in the Triassic.

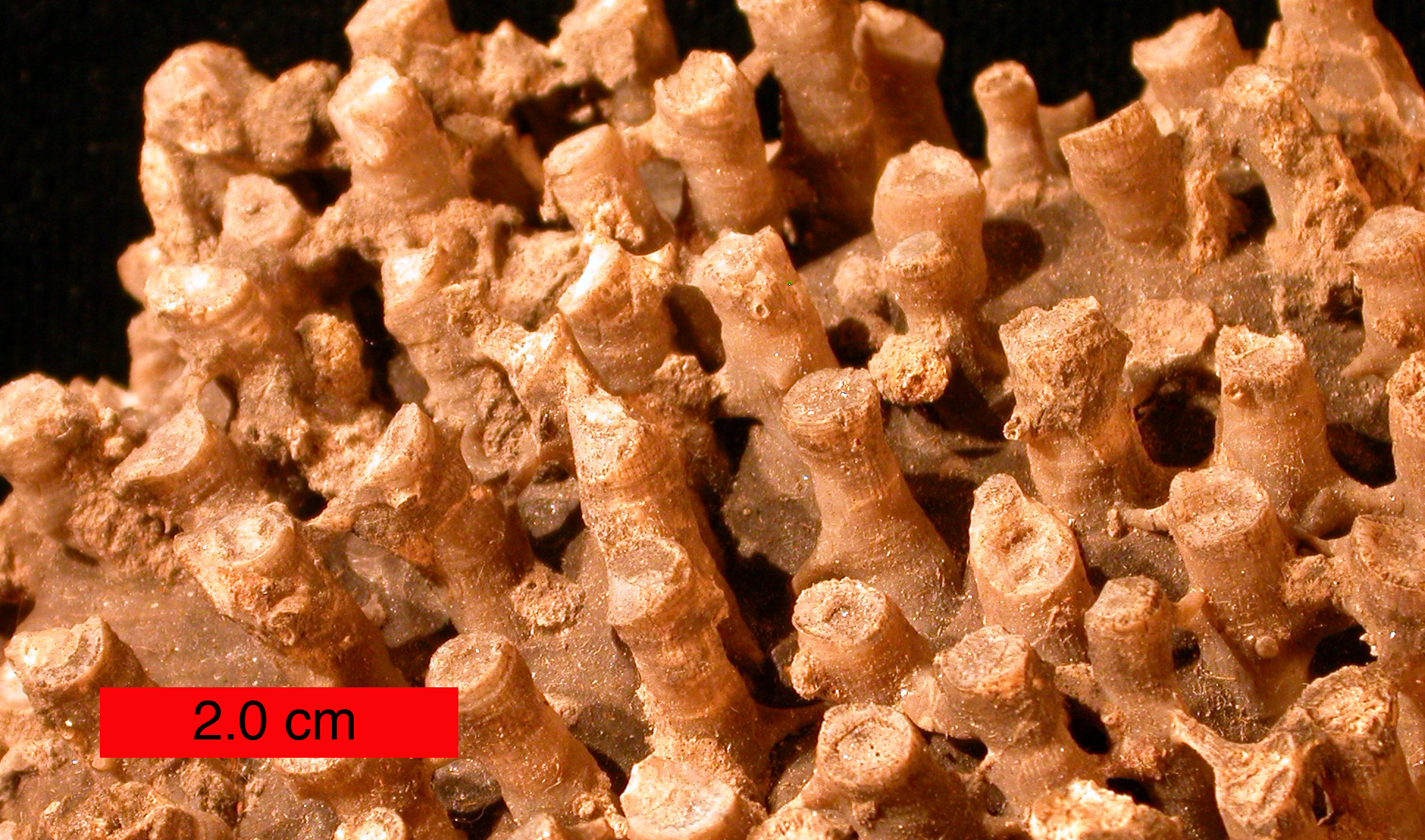
Tabulate coral (a syringoporid); Boone limestone (Lower Carboniferous) near Hiwasse, Arkansas, scale bar is 2.0 cm

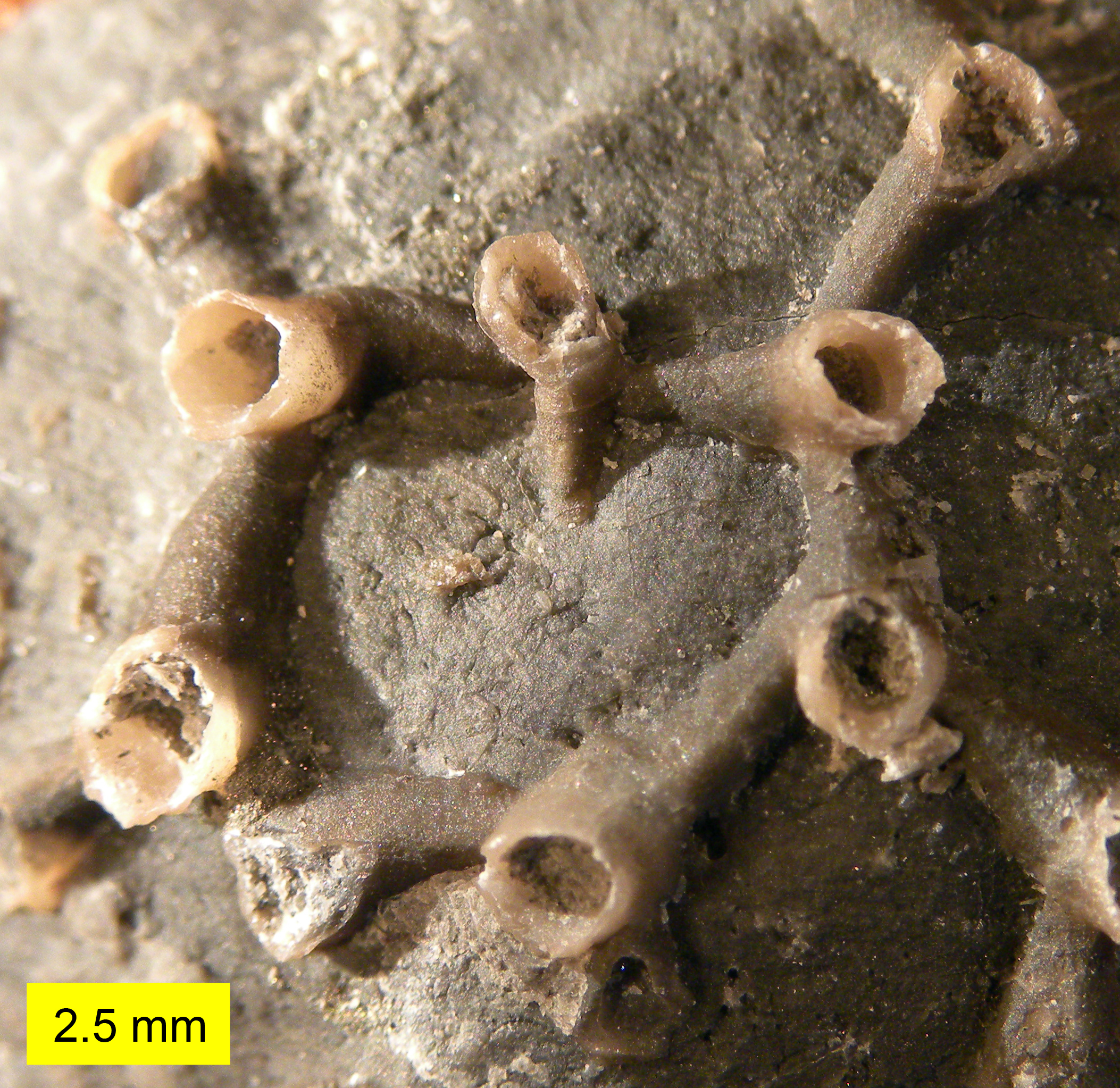
Tabulate coral Aulopora from the Devonian period

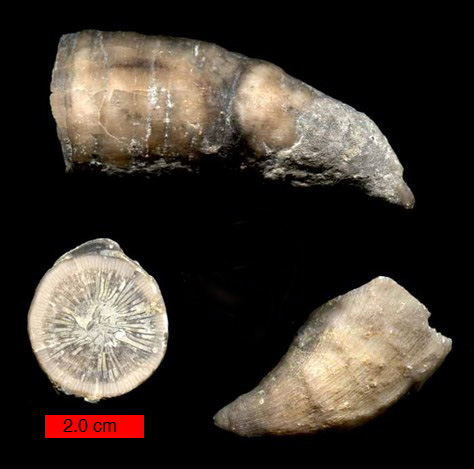
Solitary rugose coral (Grewingkia) in three views; Ordovician, southeastern Indiana

=== Modern corals ===
The currently ubiquitous stony corals, Scleractinia, appeared in the Middle Triassic to fill the niche vacated by the extinct rugose and tabulate orders and is not closely related to the earlier forms. Unlike the corals prevalent before the Permian extinction, which formed skeletons of a form of calcium carbonate known as calcite, modern stony corals form skeletons composed of aragonite. Their fossils are found in small numbers in rocks from the Triassic period, and become common in the Jurassic and later periods. Although they are geologically younger than the tabulate and rugose corals, the aragonite of their skeletons is less readily preserved, and their fossil record is accordingly less complete.

Timeline of the major coral fossil record and developments from 650 m.y.a. to present.

== Status ==
=== Threats ===
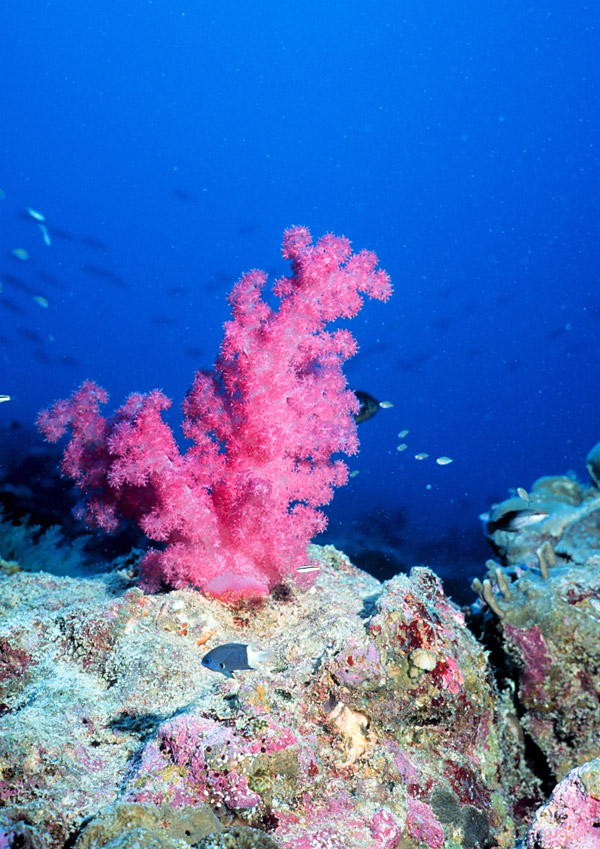
A healthy coral reef has a striking level of biodiversity in many forms of marine life.

Coral reefs are under stress around the world. In particular, coral mining, agricultural and urban runoff, pollution (organic and inorganic), overfishing, blast fishing, disease, and the digging of canals and access into islands and bays are localized threats to coral ecosystems. Broader threats are sea temperature rise, sea level rise and pH changes from ocean acidification, all associated with greenhouse gas emissions. In 1998, 16% of the world's reefs died as a result of increased water temperature.

Approximately 10% of the world's coral reefs are dead. About 60% of the world's reefs are at risk due to human-related activities. The threat to reef health is particularly strong in Southeast Asia, where 80% of reefs are endangered. Over 50% of the world's coral reefs may be destroyed by 2030; as a result, most nations protect them through environmental laws.

In the Caribbean and tropical Pacific, direct contact between ~40–70% of common seaweeds and coral causes bleaching and death to the coral via transfer of lipid-soluble metabolites. Seaweed and algae proliferate given adequate nutrients and limited grazing by herbivores such as parrotfish.

Water temperature changes of more than 1–2 °C (1.8–3.6 °F) or salinity changes can kill some species of coral. Under such environmental stresses, corals expel their Symbiodinium; without them, coral tissues reveal the white of their skeletons, an event known as coral bleaching.

Submarine springs found along the coast of Mexico's Yucatán Peninsula produce water with a naturally low pH (relatively high acidity) providing conditions similar to those expected to become widespread as the oceans absorb carbon dioxide. Surveys discovered multiple species of live coral that appeared to tolerate the acidity. The colonies were small and patchily distributed and had not formed structurally complex reefs such as those that compose the nearby Mesoamerican Barrier Reef System.

=== Measuring coral health ===
To assess the threat level of coral, scientists developed a coral imbalance ratio, Log (Average abundance of disease-associated taxa / Average abundance of healthy associated taxa). The lower the ratio the healthier the microbial community is. This ratio was developed after the microbial mucus of coral was collected and studied.

=== Climate change impacts ===
Increasing sea surface temperatures in tropical regions (~1 °C (1.8 °F)) the last century have caused major coral bleaching, death, and therefore shrinking coral populations. Although coral are able to adapt and acclimate, it is uncertain if this evolutionary process will happen quickly enough to prevent major reduction of their numbers. Climate change causes more frequent and more severe storms that can destroy coral reefs.

Annual growth bands in some corals, such as the deep sea bamboo corals (Isididae), may be among the first signs of the effects of ocean acidification on marine life. The growth rings allow geologists to construct year-by-year chronologies, a form of incremental dating, which underlie high-resolution records of past climatic and environmental changes using geochemical techniques.

Certain species form communities called microatolls, which are colonies whose top is dead and mostly above the water line, but whose perimeter is mostly submerged and alive. Average tide level limits their height. By analyzing the various growth morphologies, microatolls offer a low-resolution record of sea level change. Fossilized microatolls can also be dated using radiocarbon dating. Such methods can help to reconstruct Holocene sea levels.

Though coral have large sexually-reproducing populations, their evolution can be slowed by abundant asexual reproduction. Gene flow is variable among coral species. According to the biogeography of coral species, gene flow cannot be counted on as a dependable source of adaptation as they are very stationary organisms. Also, coral longevity might factor into their adaptivity.

However, adaptation to climate change has been demonstrated in many cases, which is usually due to a shift in coral and zooxanthellae genotypes. These shifts in allele frequency have progressed toward more tolerant types of zooxanthellae. Scientists found that a certain scleractinian zooxanthella is becoming more common where sea temperature is high. Symbionts able to tolerate warmer water seem to photosynthesise more slowly, implying an evolutionary trade-off.

In the Gulf of Mexico, where sea temperatures are rising, cold-sensitive staghorn and elkhorn coral have shifted in location. Not only have the symbionts and specific species been shown to shift, but there seems to be a certain growth rate favorable to selection. Slower-growing but more heat-tolerant corals have become more common. The changes in temperature and acclimation are complex. Some reefs in current shadows represent a refugium location that will help them adjust to the disparity in the environment even if eventually the temperatures may rise more quickly there than in other locations. This separation of populations by climatic barriers causes a realized niche to shrink greatly in comparison to the old fundamental niche.

==== Geochemistry ====
Corals are shallow, colonial organisms that integrate oxygen and trace elements into their skeletal aragonite (polymorph of calcite) crystalline structures as they grow. Geochemical anomalies within the crystalline structures of corals represent functions of temperature, salinity and oxygen isotopic composition. Such geochemical analysis can help with climate modeling. The ratio of oxygen-18 to oxygen-16 (δ^{18}O), for example, is a proxy for temperature.

===== Strontium/calcium ratio anomaly =====
Time can be attributed to coral geochemistry anomalies by correlating strontium/calcium minimums with sea surface temperature (SST) maximums to data collected from NINO 3.4 SSTA.

===== Oxygen isotope anomaly =====
The comparison of coral strontium/calcium minimums with sea surface temperature maximums, data recorded from NINO 3.4 SSTA, time can be correlated to coral strontium/calcium and δ^{18}O variations. To confirm the accuracy of the annual relationship between Sr/Ca and δ^{18}O variations, a perceptible association to annual coral growth rings confirms the age conversion. Geochronology is established by the blending of Sr/Ca data, growth rings, and stable isotope data. El Nino-Southern Oscillation (ENSO) is directly related to climate fluctuations that influence coral δ^{18}O ratio from local salinity variations associated with the position of the South Pacific convergence zone (SPCZ) and can be used for ENSO modeling.

===== Sea surface temperature and sea surface salinity =====
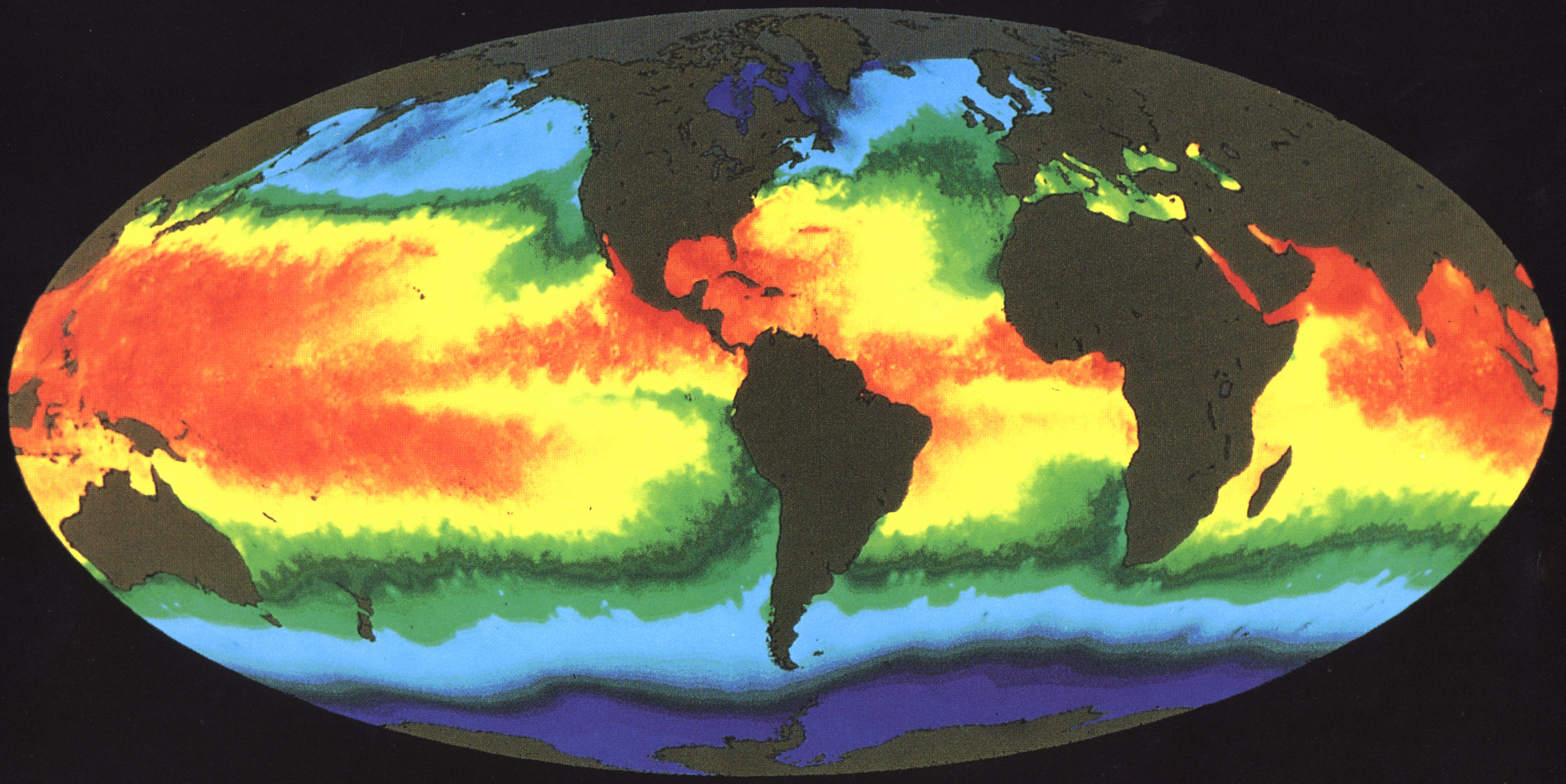
Global sea surface temperature (SST)

The global moisture budget is primarily being influenced by tropical sea surface temperatures from the position of the Intertropical Convergence Zone (ITCZ). The Southern Hemisphere has a unique meteorological feature positioned in the southwestern Pacific Basin called the South Pacific Convergence Zone (SPCZ), which contains a perennial position within the Southern Hemisphere. During ENSO warm periods, the SPCZ reverses orientation extending from the equator down south through Solomon Islands, Vanuatu, Fiji and towards the French Polynesian Islands; and due east towards South America affecting geochemistry of corals in tropical regions.

Geochemical analysis of skeletal coral can be linked to sea surface salinity (SSS) and sea surface temperature (SST), from El Nino 3.4 SSTA data, of tropical oceans to seawater δ^{18}O ratio anomalies from corals. ENSO phenomenon can be related to variations in sea surface salinity (SSS) and sea surface temperature (SST) that can help model tropical climate activities.

===== Limited climate research on current species =====
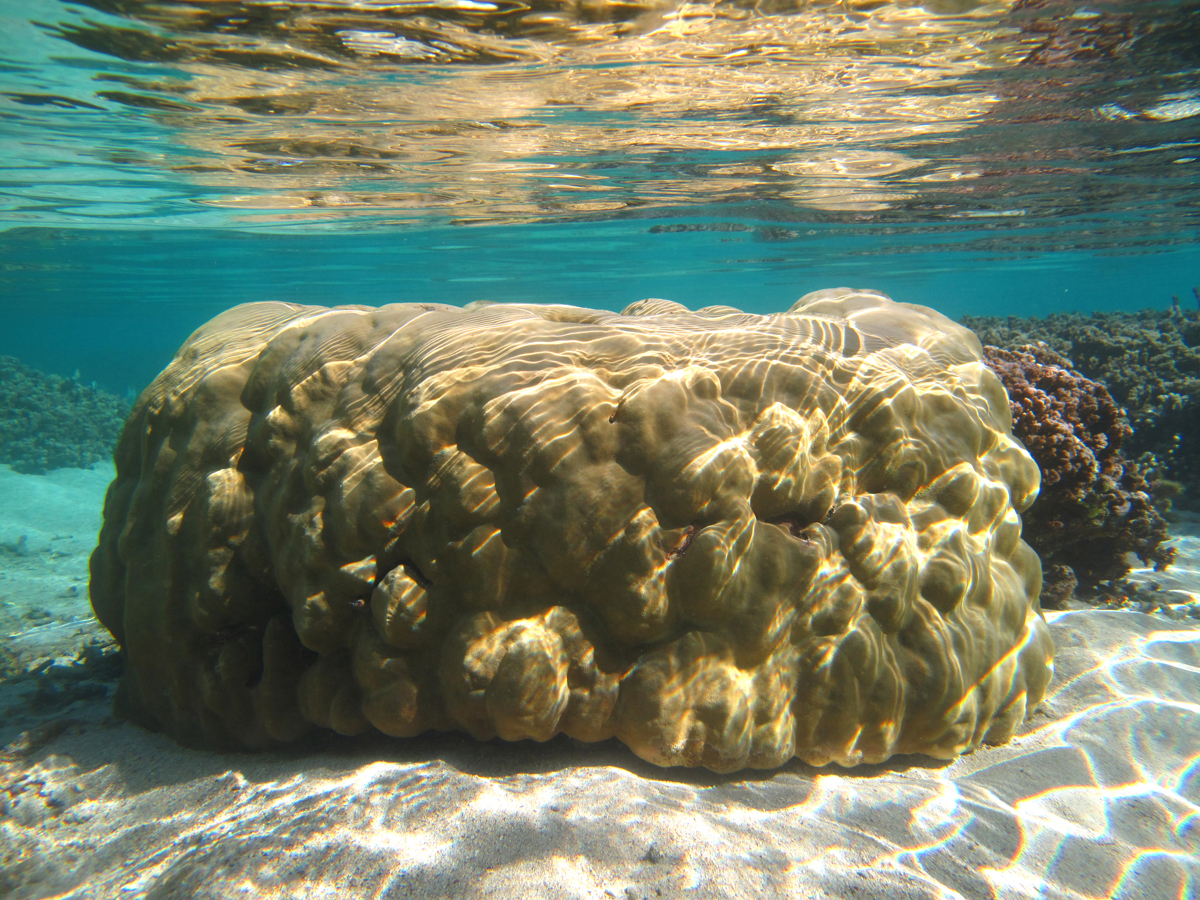
Porites lutea

Climate research on live coral species is limited to a few studied species. Studying Porites coral provides a stable foundation for geochemical interpretations that is much simpler to physically extract data in comparison to Platygyra species where the complexity of Platygyra species skeletal structure creates difficulty when physically sampled, which happens to be one of the only multidecadal living coral records used for coral paleoclimate modeling.

== Protection ==
Marine Protected Areas, Biosphere reserves, marine parks, national monuments world heritage status, fishery management and habitat protection can protect reefs from anthropogenic damage.

Many governments now prohibit removal of coral from reefs, and inform coastal residents about reef protection and ecology. While local action such as habitat restoration and herbivore protection can reduce local damage, the longer-term threats of acidification, temperature change and sea-level rise remain a challenge.

Protecting networks of diverse and healthy reefs, not only climate refugia, helps ensure the greatest chance of genetic diversity, which is critical for coral to adapt to new climates. A variety of conservation methods applied across marine and terrestrial threatened ecosystems makes coral adaption more likely and effective.

To eliminate destruction of corals in their indigenous regions, projects have been started to grow corals in non-tropical countries.

== Relation to humans ==
Local economies near major coral reefs benefit from an abundance of fish and other marine creatures as a food source. Reefs also provide recreational scuba diving and snorkeling tourism. These activities can damage coral but international projects such as Green Fins that encourage dive and snorkel centres to follow a Code of Conduct have been proven to mitigate these risks.

=== Jewelry ===
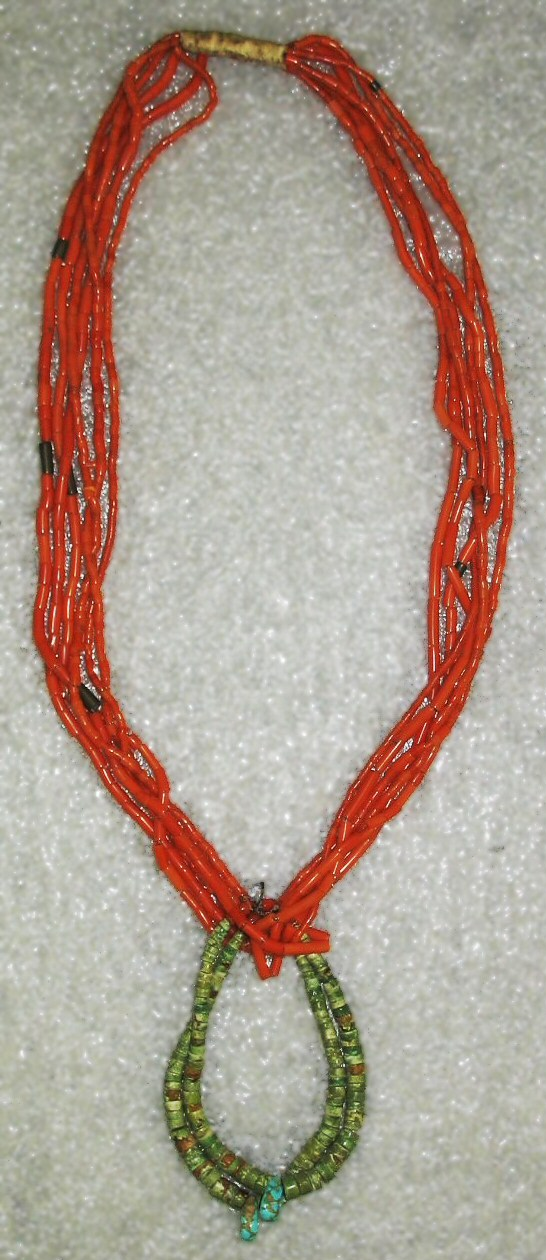
6-strand necklace, Navajo (Native American), c. 1920s, Brooklyn Museum

Corals' many colors give it appeal for necklaces and other jewelry. Intensely red coral is prized as a gemstone. Sometimes called fire coral, it is not the same as fire coral. Red coral is very rare because of overharvesting. In general, it is inadvisable to give coral as gifts since they are in decline from stressors like climate change, pollution, and unsustainable fishing.

Always considered a precious mineral, "the Chinese have long associated red coral with auspiciousness and longevity because of its color and its resemblance to deer antlers (so by association, virtue, long life, and high rank". It reached its height of popularity during the Manchu or Qing Dynasty (1644–1911) when it was almost exclusively reserved for the emperor's use either in the form of coral beads (often combined with pearls) for court jewelry or as decorative Penjing (decorative miniature mineral trees). Coral was known as shanhu in Chinese. The "early-modern 'coral network' [began in] the Mediterranean Sea [and found its way] to Qing China via the English East India Company". There were strict rules regarding its use in a code established by the Qianlong Emperor in 1759.

By the middle of the 19th century, "coral fisheries" existed in the Mediterranean, the Red Sea, Persian Gulf and elsewhere. An instrument used to retrieve the coral consisted of two beams of heavy wood attached to each other at right angles. Heavy stones were added to make the apparatus sink and netting was attached beneath the device. It is then lowered by a strong rope over an outcrop of coral and the boat trawls over the coral causing it to break off and be caught in the netting. The device is then drawn to the surface by the boat crew.

=== Medicine ===
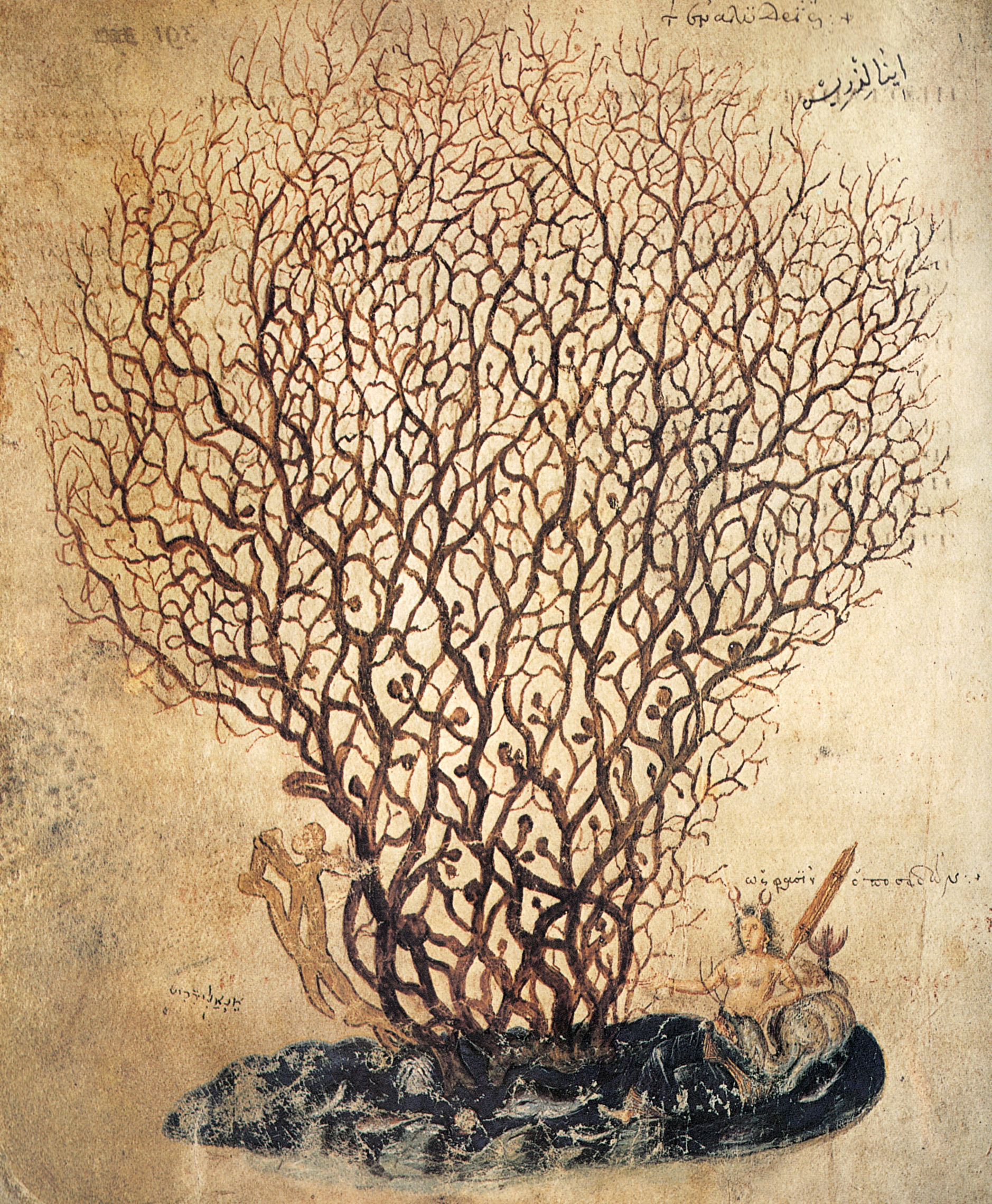
Depiction of coral in the Juliana Anicia Codex, a 6th-century copy of Dioscorides' De Materia Medica. The facing page states that coral can be used to treat ulcers.

In medicine, chemical compounds from corals can potentially be used to treat cancer, neurological diseases, inflammation including arthritis, pain, bone loss, high blood pressure and for other therapeutic uses. Coral skeletons, e.g. Isididae are being researched for their potential near-future use for bone grafting in humans. Coral Calx, known as Praval Bhasma in Sanskrit, is widely used in traditional system of Indian medicine as a supplement in the treatment of a variety of bone metabolic disorders associated with calcium deficiency. In classical times ingestion of pulverized coral, which consists mainly of the weak base calcium carbonate, was recommended for calming stomach ulcers by Galen and Dioscorides.

=== Construction ===
Coral reefs in places such as the East African coast are used as a source of building material. Ancient (fossil) coral limestone, notably including the Coral Rag Formation of the hills around Oxford (England), was once used as a building stone, and can be seen in some of the oldest buildings in that city including the Saxon tower of St Michael at the Northgate, St. George's Tower of Oxford Castle, and the medieval walls of the city.

=== Shoreline protection ===
Healthy coral reefs absorb 97 percent of a wave's energy, which buffers shorelines from currents, waves, and storms, helping to prevent loss of life and property damage. Coastlines protected by coral reefs are also more stable in terms of erosion than those without.

=== Local economies ===
Coastal communities near coral reefs rely heavily on them. Worldwide, more than 500 million people depend on coral reefs for food, income, coastal protection, and more. The total economic value of coral reef services in the United States – including fisheries, tourism, and coastal protection – is more than $3.4 billion a year.

=== Aquaria ===
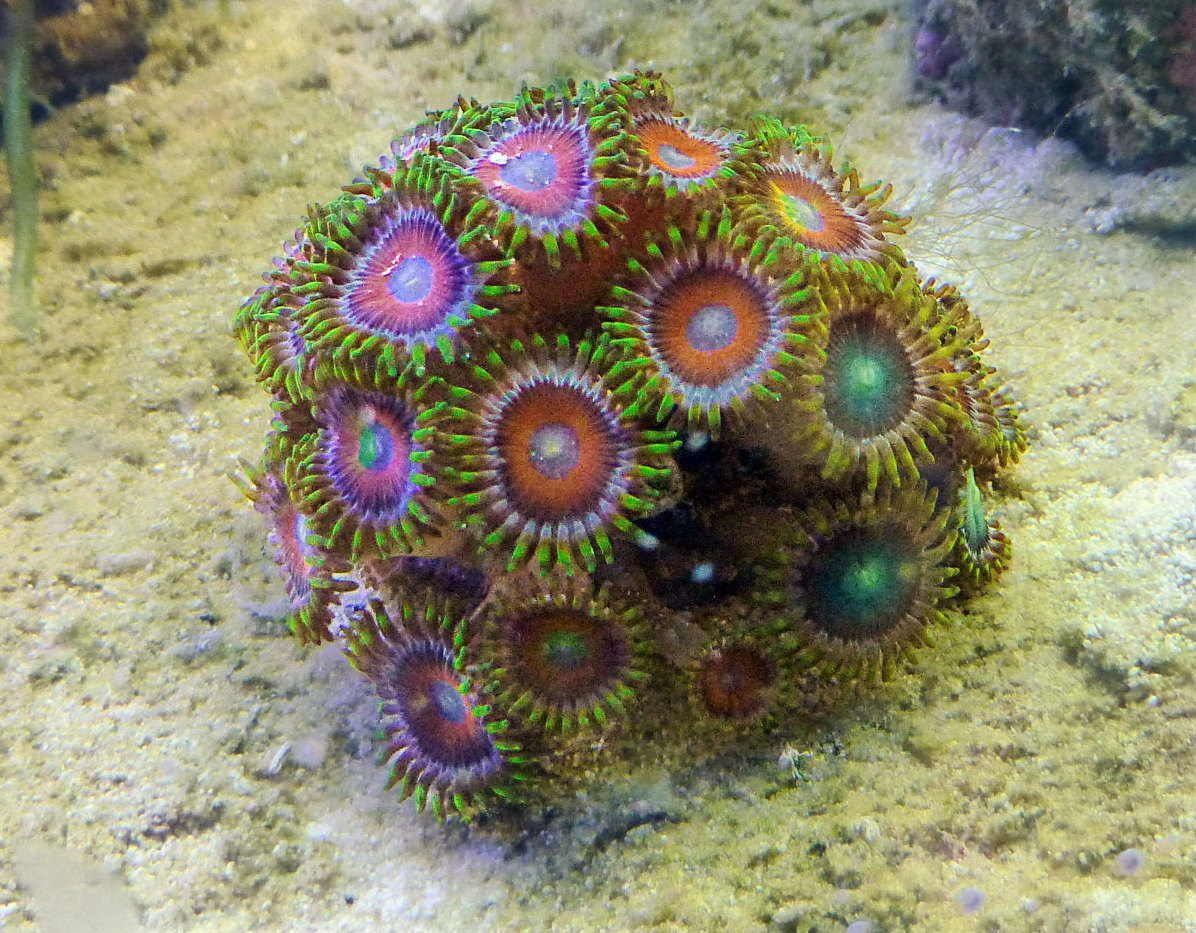
This dragon-eye zoanthid is a popular source of color in reef tanks.

The saltwater fishkeeping hobby has expanded, over recent years, to include reef tanks, which are fish tanks that include large amounts of live rock on which coral is allowed to grow and spread. These tanks are either kept in a natural-like state, with algae (sometimes in the form of an algae scrubber) and a deep sand bed providing filtration, or as "show tanks", with the rock kept largely bare of the algae and microfauna that would normally populate it, in order to appear neat and clean.

The most popular kind of coral kept is soft coral, especially zoanthids and mushroom corals, which are especially easy to grow and propagate in a wide variety of conditions, because they originate in enclosed parts of reefs where water conditions vary and lighting may be less reliable and direct. More serious fishkeepers may keep small polyp stony coral, which is from open, brightly lit reef conditions and therefore much more demanding, while large polyp stony coral is a sort of compromise between the two.

=== Aquaculture ===
Coral aquaculture, also known as coral farming or coral gardening, is the cultivation of corals for commercial purposes or coral reef restoration. Aquaculture is showing promise as a potentially effective tool for restoring coral reefs, which have been declining around the world. The process bypasses the early growth stages of corals when they are most at risk of dying. Coral fragments known as "seeds" are grown in nurseries then replanted on the reef. Coral is farmed by coral farmers who live locally to the reefs and farm for reef conservation or for income. It is also farmed by scientists for research, by businesses for the supply of the live and ornamental coral trade and by private aquarium hobbyists.

== Gallery ==
Further images: commons:Category:Coral reefs and commons:Category:Corals

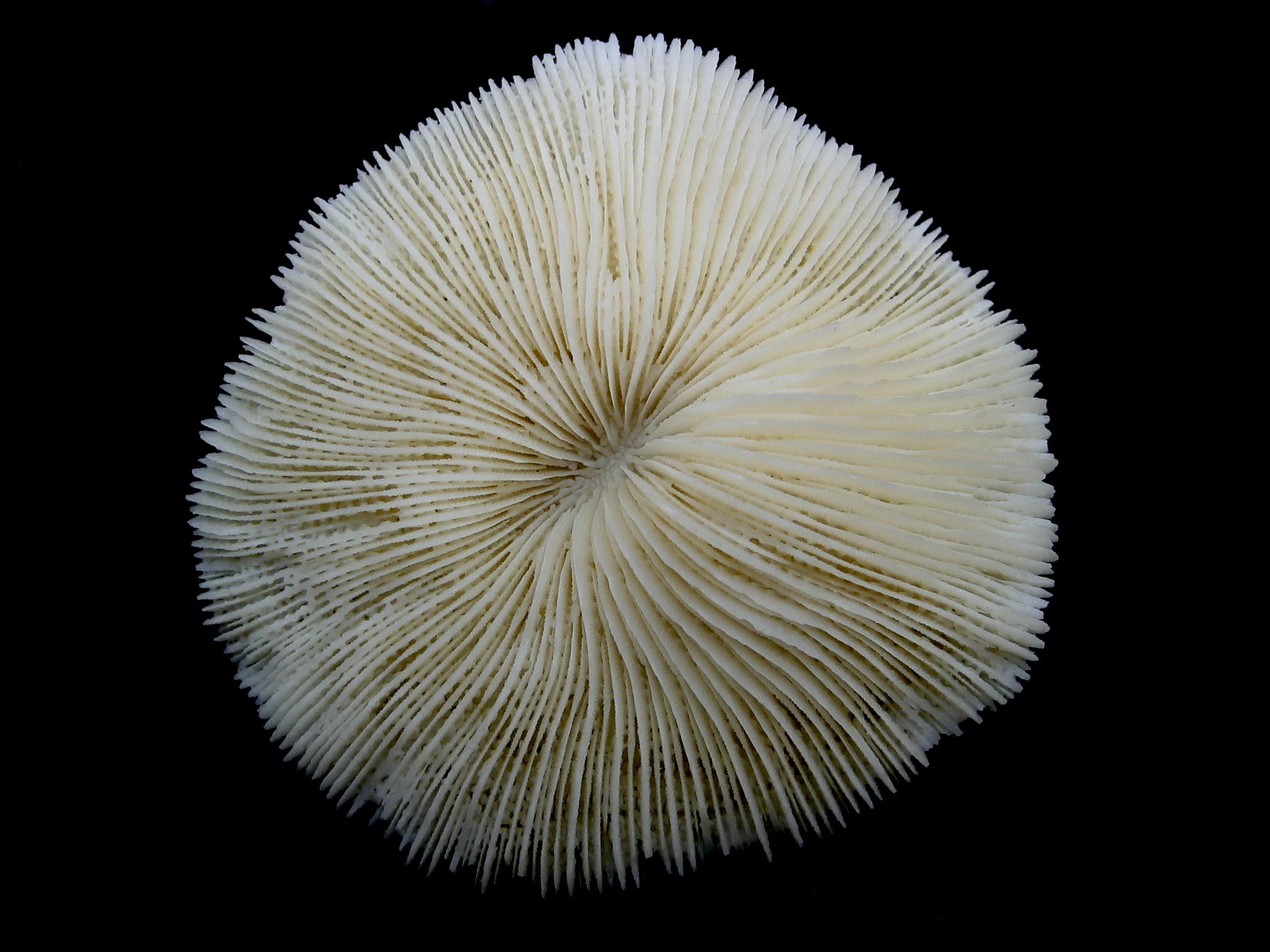
Fungia sp. skeleton

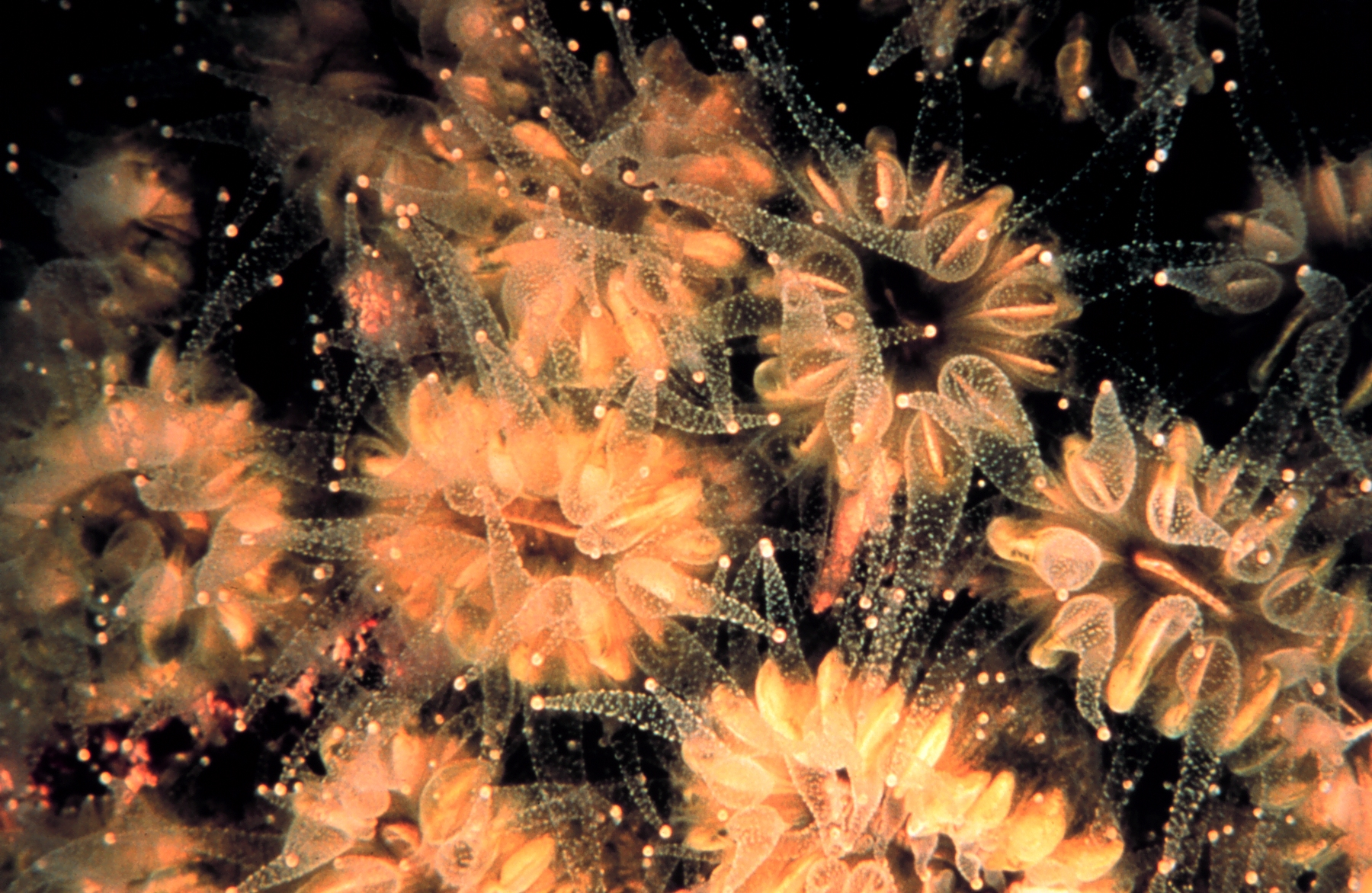
Polyps of Eusmilia fastigiata

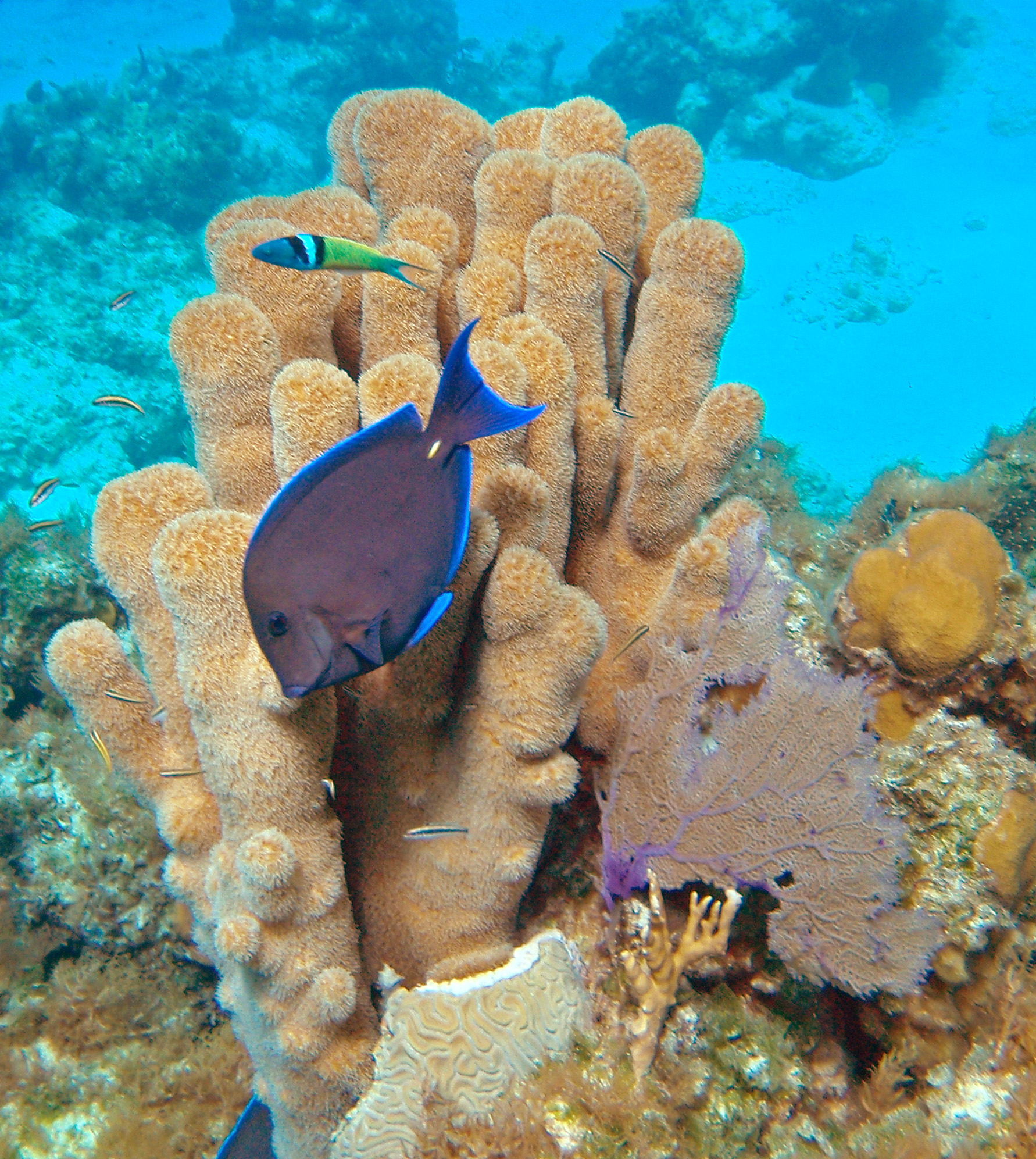
Pillar coral, Dendrogyra cylindricus

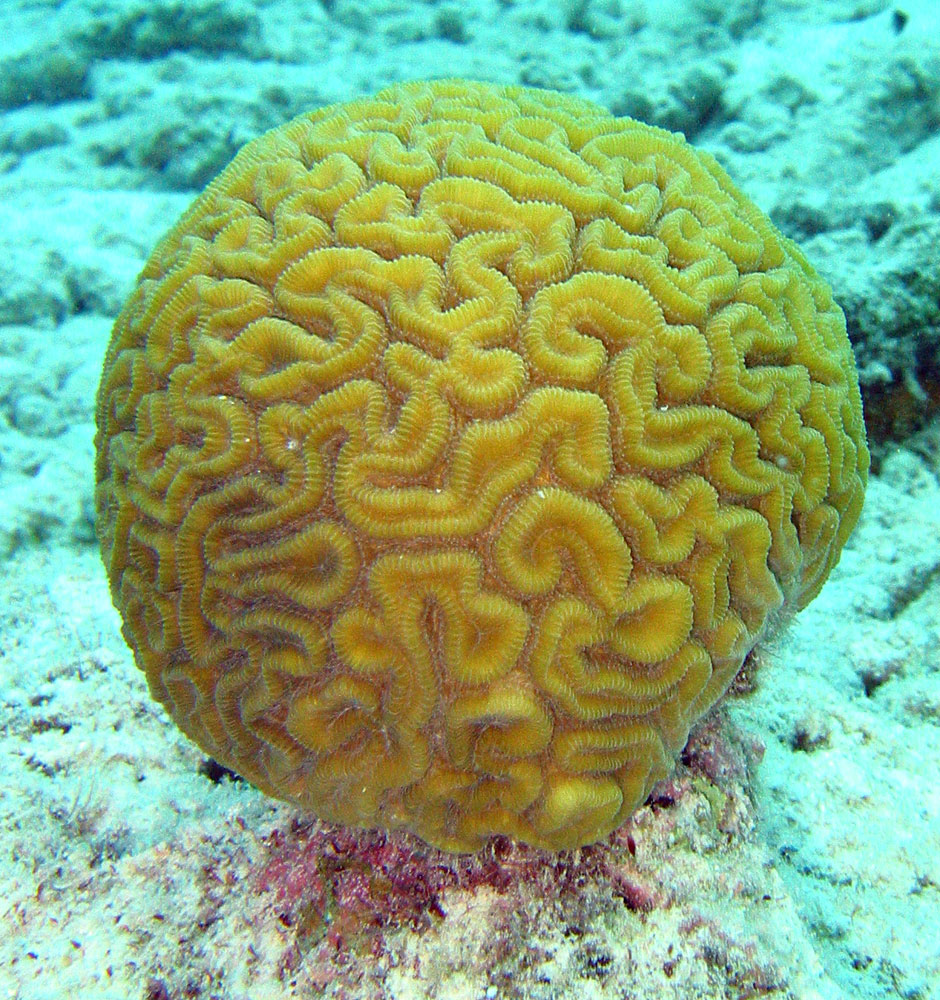
Brain coral, Diploria labyrinthiformis

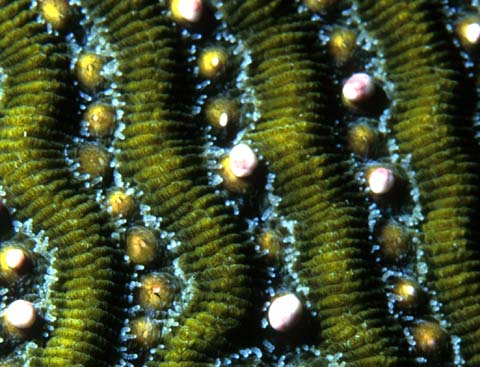
Brain coral releasing eggs

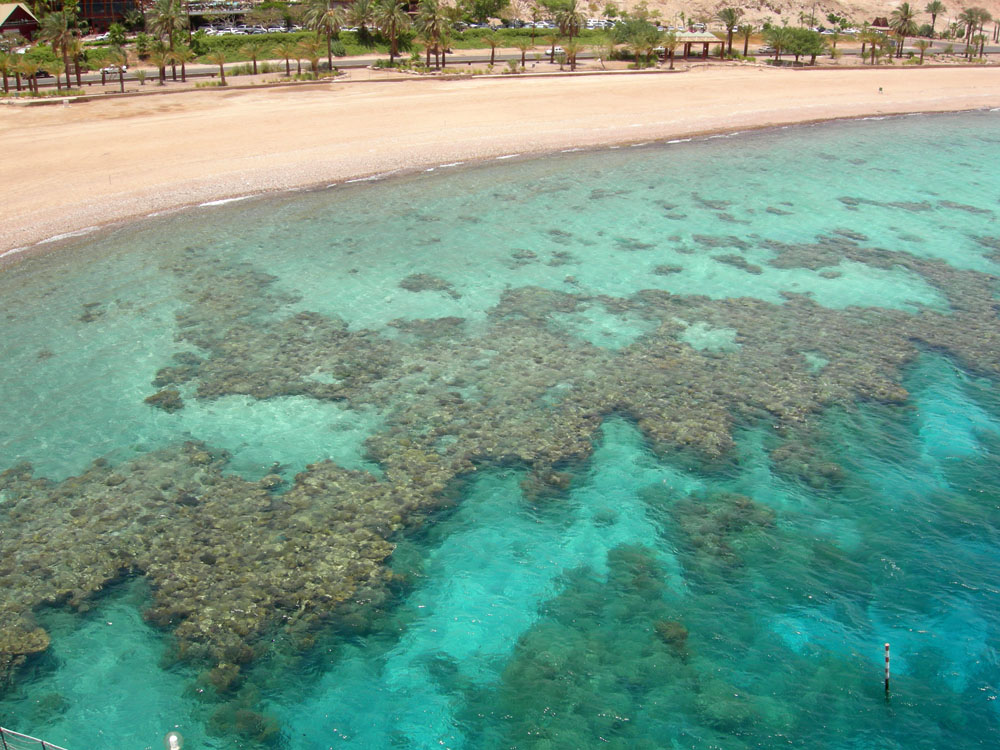
Fringing coral reef off the coast of Eilat, Israel.

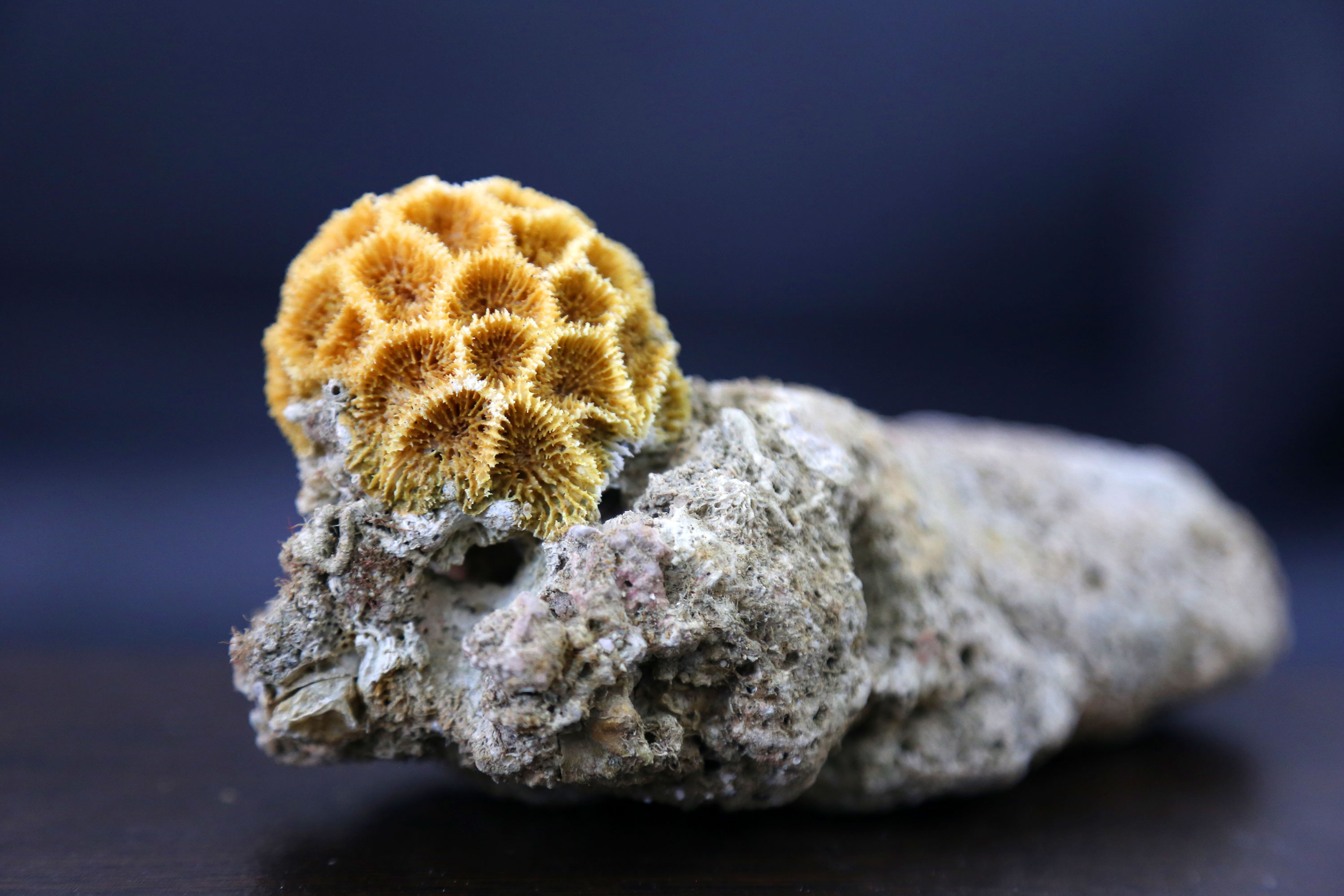
Corals, Tis Beach, Chabahar, Iran

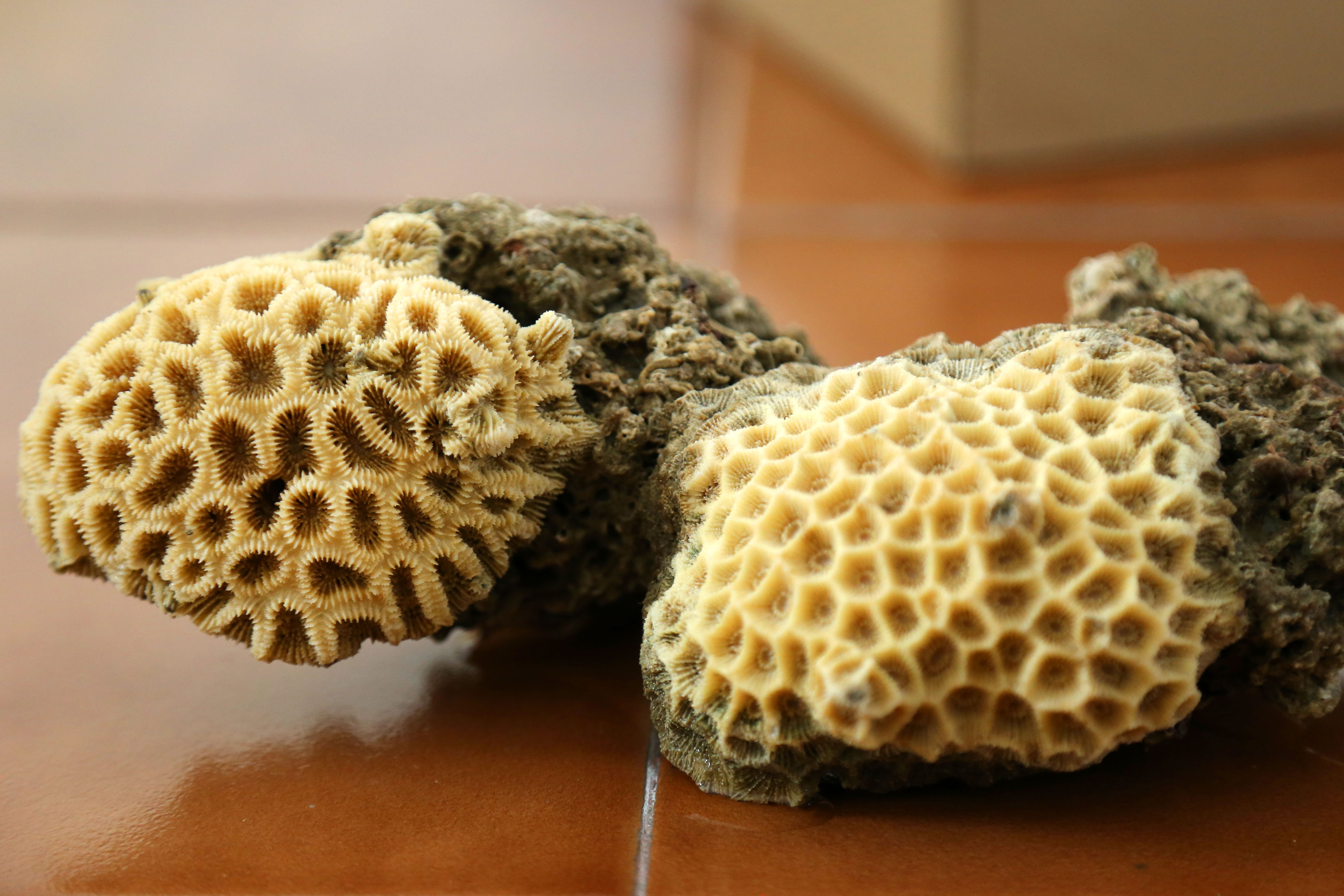
Corals, Tis Beach, Chabahar, Iran

== See also ==
- Keystone species
- Ringstead Coral Bed

== Sources ==
- Allen, G.R.; R. Steene (1994). Indo-Pacific Coral Reef Field Guide. Tropical Reef Research. ISBN 978-981-00-5687-2.
- Calfo, Anthony (2007). Book of Coral Propagation. Reading Trees Publications. ISBN 978-0-9802365-0-7.
- Colin, P.L.; C. Arneson (1995). Tropical Pacific Invertebrates. Coral Reef Press. ISBN 978-0-9645625-0-9.
- Fagerstrom, J.A. (1987). The Evolution of Reef Communities. Wiley. ISBN 978-0-471-81528-0.
- Gosliner, T.; D. Behrens; G. Williams (1996). Coral Reef Animals of the Indo-Pacific, Animals Life from Africa to Hawaiʻi (invertebrates). Sea Challengers. ISBN 978-0-930118-21-1.
- Nybakken, J.W. (2004). Marine Biology, An Ecological Approach. Pearson/Benjamin Cummings. ISBN 978-0-8053-4582-7.
- Redhill, Surrey. Corals of the World: Biology and Field Guide.
- Segaloff, Nat; Paul Erickson (1991). A Reef Comes to Life. Creating an Undersea Exhibit. F. Watts. ISBN 978-0-531-10994-6.
- Sheppard, Charles R.C.; Davy, Simon K.; Pilling, Graham M. (25 June 2009). The Biology of Coral Reefs. OUP Oxford. ISBN 978-0-19-105734-2.
- Veron, J.E.N. (1993). Corals of Australia and the Indo-Pacific. University of Hawaii Press. ISBN 978-0-8248-1504-2.
- Wells, Susan (1988). Coral Reefs of the World. IUCN, UNEP. ISBN 978-2-88032-944-0.
