= Incremental dating =

Technique for determining lengths of time

Incremental dating techniques allow the construction of year-by-year annual chronologies, which can be temporally fixed (i.e., linked to the present day and thus calendar or sidereal time) or floating.

Archaeologists use tree-ring dating (dendrochronology) to determine the age of old pieces of wood. Trees usually add growth rings on a yearly basis, with the spacing of rings being wider in high growth years and narrower in low growth years. Patterns in tree-ring growth can be used to establish the age of old wood samples, and also give some hints to local climatic conditions. This technique is useful to about 9,000 years ago for samples from the western United States using overlapping tree-ring series from living and dead wood.

The Earth's orbital motions (inclination of the Earth's axis on its orbit with respect to the Sun, gyroscopic precession of the Earth's axis every 26,000 years; free precession every 440 days, precession of Earth orbit and orbital variations such as perihelion precession every 19,000 and 23,000 years) leave traces visible in the geological record. These changes provide a long-term sequence of climatic events, recorded as changes in the thickness of sediment layers (known as "varve analysis"—the term "varve" means a layer or layers of sediment. Typically, varve refers to lake or glacial sediment), as temperature induced changes in the isotopic ratios for oxygen isotopes in sediments, and in the relative abundance of fossils. Because these can be calibrated reliably over a period of 40 million years this provides an alternate verification to radiometric dating in cases where sufficient record exists to provide a reliable trace.

Polarity reversals in the Earth's magnetic field have also been used to determine geologic time. Periodically, the magnetic field of the Earth reverses leaving a magnetic signal in volcanic and sedimentary rocks. This signal can be detected and sequences recorded, and in the case of volcanic rocks, tied to radiometric dates.

Another technique used by archaeologists is to inspect the depth of penetration of water vapor into chipped obsidian (volcanic glass) artifacts. The water vapor creates a "hydration rind" in the obsidian, and so this approach is known as "hydration dating" or "obsidian dating", and is useful for determining dates as far back as 200,000 years.

== Techniques ==
Techniques of incremental dating include:

- Dendrochronology
- Sampling Ice cores
- Lichenometry
- Paleomagnetic dating
- Varves
- Speleothems
- Acanthochronology
- Sclerochronology
