= Hunting strategy =

Tactic used to target, pursue, and kill an animal

Hunting strategy or hunting method is any specific techniques or tactics that are used to target, pursue, and hunt an animal. The term mostly applies to humans catching and killing wild animals, but can also be used in ethology and nature documentaries to describe predation strategies adopted by carnivores.

The hunting strategy that a hunter uses depends mainly on the type of terrain, as well as game being hunted. Climate, local hunting techniques, and local hunting laws are also taken in consideration. Some of the most common hunting methods that are used include: still hunting, stalking, driving, stand hunting, calling, baiting, hunting with dogs and falconry.

== Strategies ==
Hunting strategies include:

- Shooting is the use of a ranged weapon such as a gun, bow, crossbow or slingshot to launch projectiles and kill/incapacitate animals.
  - Sniping is shooting from concealments such as in a hunting blind, behind shrubs, from a distant/vantaged position beyond visual range, or under camouflage clothings such as a Ghillie suit.
  - Stand hunting is the use of a tree stand to shoot down at animals from an elevated position.
  - Darting is the use of darts (often loaded with poison or tranquilizer) shot from blowguns or airguns to kill/incapacitate animals. Non-lethal darting with intention to release the animal alive afterwards is also called green hunting.
  - Slinging is the use of a sling to hurl rocks and hunt animals.
  - Internet hunting is a method of hunting using webcams and remotely controlled guns, now considered illegal.
- Posting is done by sitting or standing in a particular place with the intentions of intercepting the game of choice along their travel corridor.
- Spearing and clubing are the use of handheld melee weapons to physically impale/strike and kill animals.
- Baiting is the use of food, decoys or scent to attract targets animals.
  - Calling is the imitative use of noises to attract animals.
- Trapping is the use of hidden devices such as snares, pits, deadfalls and booby traps to capture or kill an animal.
- Netting involves using nets to entangle and trap animals, including active netting with the use of cannon nets and rocket nets.
- Stalking or still hunting is the practice of walking quietly through a habitat in search or in pursuit of an individual animal.
  - Tracking is the practice of identifying animal tracks when pursuing or stalking animals.
- Driving is the herding of animals in a particular direction, as over a cliff, a trap, or towards an ambush set by other hunters.
  - Battue involves scaring animals and actively pursuing them into an ambush area.
  - Game drive system was a prehistoric hunting strategy where game animals were herded into areas where they could be hunted in groups.
- Coursing is the use of hunting dogs (hounds) to pursue and catch wild animals.
  - Beagling is the use of beagles in hunting rabbits, and sometimes in hunting foxes.
- Flushing is the practice of spooking animals out of concealment into the open areas where they can be seen, shot or pursued.
  - Beating uses human beaters to flush out animals or drive it into position.
- Falconry or hawking is the use of trained birds of prey to hunt wild animals in their natural state and habitat.
- Glue is an indiscriminate passive form to kill birds.
- Persistence hunting is the use of running and tracking to pursue the prey to exhaustion.
- Scouting consists of a variety of tasks and techniques for finding animals to hunt.
  - Glassing is the use of optical instruments such as binoculars to locate animals more easily.
  - Spotlighting or lamping is the use of a bright light beam to find eyeshines and/or flash-blind animals before capture or killing. Modern spotlighting also includes infrared and other devices.
- Solunar theory says that animals move according to the location of the moon in comparison to their bodies and is said to have been used long before this by hunters to know the best times to hunt their desired game.

== Stalking ==
Though stalking and still-hunting may resemble in many ways, while the still hunter follows game through its haunts following tracks, stalking, or spot and stalk hunting, consists in locating game from afar and trying to approach within shooting distance, taking advantage of the territory's geography, forest, wind direction and sun location, thus, avoiding to be detected through sight, sounds and smells. Stalk hunting is mainly practiced in mountain terrain, inhabited by animals with low tolerance for human presence, such as sheep, goats, and several mountain deer species. In order to be successful, the hunter gets advantage from vantage points from where to spot game in open ground, that provides less concealment than forested areas.

=== Pushing ===
This strategy is widely used to hunt elusive game in heavy covered areas. It is probably one of the first methods of hunting used by primitive tribes, and even used by animals, such as African lions, where male lions show themselves with aid of their smell and roar to spook antelope towards the position where the more agile lioness is concealed. Humans also use the same principle; pushing game out of forest towards a hunter ready to take a shot.

=== Stand hunting ===
Stand hunting is likely the most common form of hunting used today when hunting for most North American big game species, especially in the east. Stand hunting is when the hunter is stationary in one location and waits for the animal to come to them. Hunters often use tree-stands, ground blinds, and tripod stands to make the hunt more comfortable and to make it harder for the wildlife to spot them. The locations where hunters chose to stand hunt varies greatly. Often hunters will set up a stand near a food source that their target animal species is coming to for food. Hunters will also stand hunt along game trails, and even near water sources in drier climates. The stand hunting method is also the fundamental method used when using baiting, and often calling hunting methods.

==== Calling ====
The technique of calling can be a very effective hunting technique. Calling is the process of using game calls or some other instrument to replicate the sounds of the animal that you are hunting. Game calls are especially effective during the desired species' mating season. During this time, animal mating calls can be a sure fire way to lure in an animal that is within earshot of you. The most common calls used when hunting deer are grunt calls, bleat calls, and rattling antlers. The grunt call can be aggressive buck grunts that would attract a buck that is looking to display his dominance, while bleat calls mimic the sound of a doe that is looking for a buck to breed her. Rattling antlers imitate the sound of two bucks fighting and can lure other bucks in to see what the commotion is all about.

==== Baiting ====
While baiting is an extremely popular and very effective way to encounter various species of wildlife, it is important to check local game laws to ensure that baiting is legal in the area. While most places allow baiting, some areas still deem it illegal to bait wildlife. Baiting is the act of using an artificial food source that is placed near your hunting stand to attract the species of animal that is being pursued. Some common baits that are used to attract big game in North America are things such as dried field corn, apples, salt, minerals, and occasionally processed foods such as peanut butter and molasses.

=== Still hunting ===
Still hunting is a common method of hunting used to hunt North American big game species such as deer, elk, bear, and feral hogs. Still hunting is the process of hunting an animal by sneaking into habitats where the animal lives and trying to spot the animal before the animal spots you. The process emulates the final procedure of spot and stalk hunting throughout the entire process. The still hunting method of hunting is not the most popular hunting technique because it takes a fair amount of skill and time. Still hunting is an ancient method of hunting that was used by our ancestors to hunt and kill animals to eat. Still hunting is done by tracking animals down by looking for their tracks, droppings, mating signs, etc. and following this sign very carefully. When following the animal sign it is important to walk very slowly and very quietly while constantly scanning for movement and wildlife. It is also important to stop frequently to watch and listen for wildlife around you. Wind direction is another important aspect of still hunting because if the wind is blowing in the direction that you are walking, it is likely that the animal that you are hunting will smell you and scurry before you ever come into contact with the animal.
