= Rhytisma =

Rhytisma is the scientific name of two genera of organisms and may refer to:

- Rhytisma (coral), a genus of corals in the family Alcyoniidae
- Rhytisma (fungus), a genus of fungi in the family Rhytismataceae
