= Lunar effect =

Unproven proposal of influence of lunar cycle on terrestrial creatures

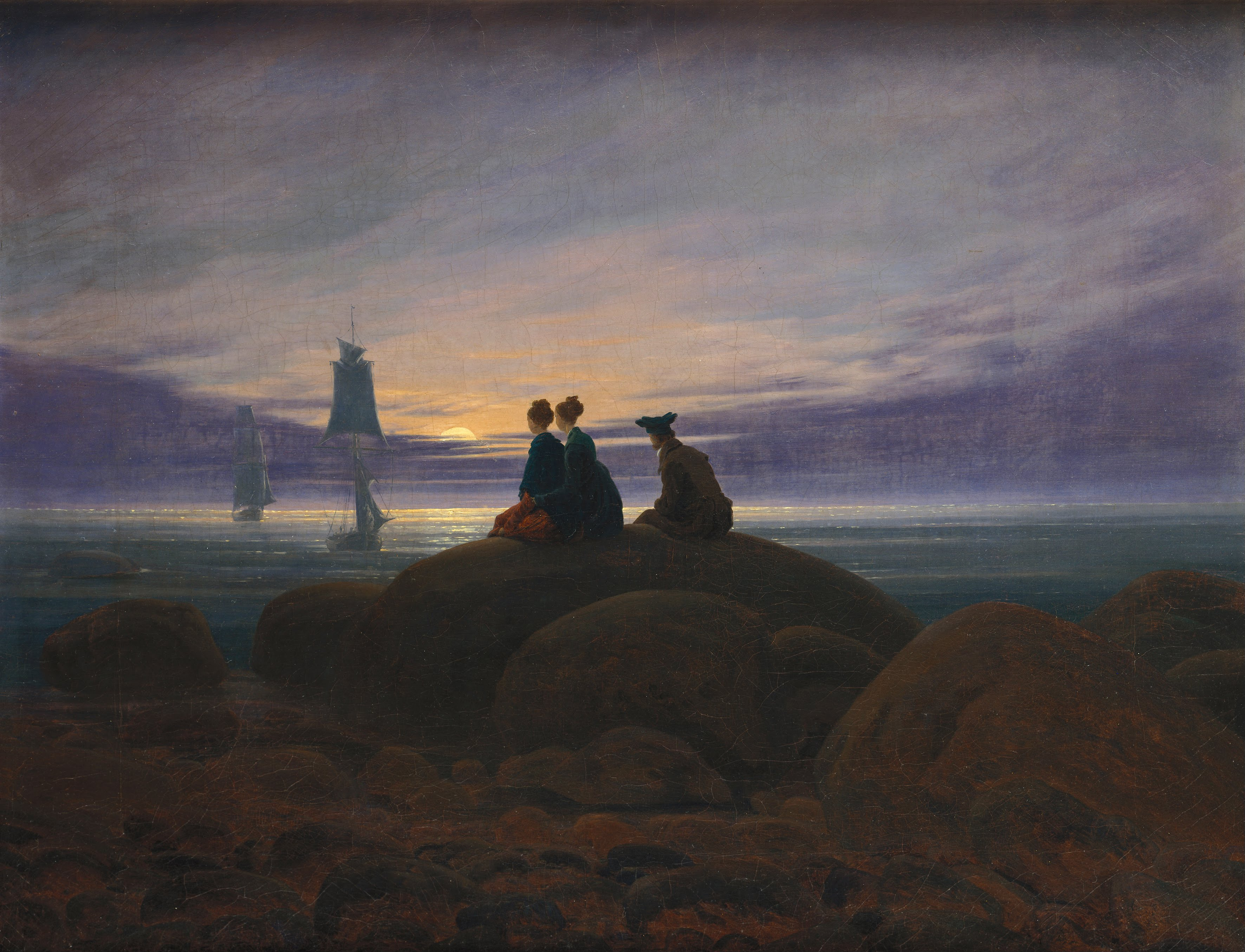
Moonrise by the Sea. Biologists as well as artists and poets have long thought about the Moon's influence on living creatures.

The lunar effect is a link between different stages of the 29.5-day lunar cycle and the behavior and physiology of various species, purportedly including humans. The changing phase and position of the Moon in its orbit impacts night lighting and ocean tides on Earth. Various organisms have adapted to this repeating cycle.

A considerable number of studies have examined the effect on humans. By the late 1980s, there were at least 40 published studies on the purported lunar-lunacy connection, and at least 20 published studies on the purported lunar-birthrate connection. Literature reviews and metanalyses have found no correlation between the lunar cycle and human biology or behavior. In cases such as the approximately monthly cycle of menstruation in humans (but not other mammals), the coincidence in timing reflects no known lunar influence. The widespread and persistent beliefs about the influence of the Moon may depend on illusory correlation – the perception of an association that does not in fact exist.

In a number of marine animals, there is strong evidence for the effects of lunar cycles. Observed effects relating to reproductive synchrony may depend on external cues relating to the presence or amount of moonlight. Corals contain light-sensitive cryptochromes, proteins that are sensitive to different levels of light. Coral species such as Dipsastraea speciosa tend to synchronize spawning in the evening or night, around the last quarter moon of the lunar cycle. In Dipsastraea speciosa, a period of darkness between sunset and moonrise appears to be a trigger for synchronized spawning. Another marine animal, the bristle worm Platynereis dumerilii, spawns a few days after a full moon. It contains a protein with light-absorbing flavin structures that differentially detect moonlight and sunlight. It is used as a model for studying the biological mechanisms of marine lunar cycles.

== Human contexts ==
Claims of a lunar connection have appeared in the following contexts:

=== Fertility ===
It is widely believed that the Moon has a relationship with fertility due to the corresponding human menstrual cycle, which averages 28 days. However, no connection between lunar rhythms and menstrual onset has been conclusively shown to exist, and the similarity in length between the two cycles is most likely coincidental.

=== Birth rate ===
Multiple studies have found no connection between birth rate and lunar phases. A 1957 analysis of 9,551 births in Danville, Pennsylvania, found no correlation between birth rate and the phase of the Moon. Records of 11,961 live births and 8,142 natural births (not induced by drugs or cesarean section) over a 4-year period (1974–1978) at the UCLA hospital did not correlate in any way with the cycle of lunar phases. Analysis of 3,706 spontaneous births (excluding births resulting from induced labor) in 1994 showed no correlation with lunar phase. The distribution of 167,956 spontaneous vaginal deliveries, at 37 to 40 weeks gestation, in Phoenix, Arizona, between 1995 and 2000, showed no relationship with lunar phase. Analysis of 564,039 births (1997 to 2001) in North Carolina showed no predictable influence of the lunar cycle on deliveries or complications. Analysis of 6,725 deliveries (2000 to 2006) in Hannover revealed no significant correlation of birth rate to lunar phases. A 2001 analysis of 70,000,000 birth records from the National Center for Health Statistics revealed no correlation between birth rate and lunar phase. An extensive review of 21 studies from seven different countries showed that the majority of studies reported no relationship to lunar phase, and that the positive studies were inconsistent with each other. A review of six additional studies from five different countries similarly showed no evidence of relationship between birth rate and lunar phase. In 2021, an analysis of 38.7 million births in France over 50 years, with a detailed correction for birth variations linked to holidays, and robust statistical methods to avoid false detections linked to multiple tests, found a very small (+0.4%) but statistically significant surplus of births on the full moon day, and to a lesser extent the following day. The probability of this excess being due to chance is very low, of the order of one chance in 100,000 (p-value = 1.5 x 10–5). The belief that there is a large surplus of births on full moon days is incorrect, and it is completely impossible for an observer to detect the small increase of +0.4% in a maternity hospital, even on a long time scale.

=== Blood loss ===
It is sometimes claimed that surgeons used to refuse to operate during the full Moon because of the increased risk of death of the patient through blood loss. One team, in Barcelona, Spain, reported a weak correlation between lunar phase and hospital admissions due to gastrointestinal bleeding, but only when comparing full Moon days to all non-full Moon days lumped together. This methodology has been criticized, and the statistical significance of the results disappears if one compares day 29 of the lunar cycle (full Moon) to days 9, 12, 13, or 27 of the lunar cycle, which all have an almost equal number of hospital admissions. The Spanish team acknowledged that the wide variation in the number of admissions throughout the lunar cycle limited the interpretation of the results.

In October 2009, British politician David Tredinnick asserted that during a full Moon "[s]urgeons will not operate because blood clotting is not effective and the police have to put more people on the street.". A spokesman for the Royal College of Surgeons said they would "laugh their heads off" at the suggestion they could not operate on the full Moon.

=== Human behavior ===
==== Epilepsy ====
A study into epilepsy found a significant negative correlation between the mean number of epileptic seizures per day and the fraction of the Moon that is illuminated, but the effect resulted from the overall brightness of the night, rather than from the moon phase per se.

==== Law and order ====
Senior police officers in Brighton, UK, announced in June 2007 that they were planning to deploy more officers over the summer to counter trouble they believe is linked to the lunar cycle. This followed research by the Sussex Police force that concluded there was a rise in violent crime when the Moon was full. A spokeswoman for the police force said "research carried out by us has shown a correlation between violent incidents and full moons". A police officer responsible for the research told the BBC that "From my experience of 19 years of being a police officer, undoubtedly on full moons we do seem to get people with sort of strange behavior – more fractious, argumentative."

Police in Ohio and Kentucky have blamed temporary rises in crime on the full Moon.

In January 2008, New Zealand's Justice Minister Annette King suggested that a spate of stabbings in the country could have been caused by the lunar cycle.

A reported correlation between Moon phase and the number of homicides in Miami-Dade County was found, through later analysis, not to be supported by the data and to have been the result of inappropriate and misleading statistical procedures.

A 2009 study of over 23,000 aggravated assaults in Germany between 1999 and 2005 found no correlation with lunar phases. A 2016 study comparing indoor and outdoor crime in the District of Columbia found that the intensity of moonlight had no effect on indoor crime, but a positive effect on outdoor criminal activity. The study's authors speculated that the effect may be due to criminals being better able to assess potential victims and unsecured properties, and there being more such victims out on the street on lighter nights.

==== Motorcycle fatalities ====
A study of 13,029 motorcyclists killed in nighttime crashes found that there were 5.3% more fatalities on nights with a full moon compared to other nights. The authors speculate that the increase might be due to visual distractions created by the moon, especially when it is near the horizon and appears abruptly between trees, around turns, etc.

==== Stock market ====
Several studies have argued that the stock market's average returns are much higher during the half of the month closest to the new moon than the half closest to the full moon. The reasons for this have not been studied, but the authors suggest this may be due to lunar influences on mood. Another study has found contradictory results and questioned these claims.

==== Meta-analyses ====
A meta-analysis of thirty-seven studies that examined relationships between the Moon's four phases and human behavior revealed no significant correlation. The authors found that, of twenty-three studies that had claimed to show correlation, nearly half contained at least one statistical error. Similarly, in a review of twenty studies examining correlations between Moon phase and suicides, most of the twenty studies found no correlation, and the ones that did report positive results were inconsistent with each other. A 1978 review of the literature also found that lunar phases and human behavior are not related.

=== Sleep quality ===
A 2013 study by Christian Cajochen and collaborators at the University of Basel suggested a correlation between the full Moon and human sleep quality. However, the validity of these results may be limited because of a relatively small (n=33) sample size and inappropriate controls for age and sex. A 2014 study with larger sample sizes (n1=366, n2=29, n3=870) and better experimental controls found no effect of the lunar phase on sleep quality metrics. A 2015 study of 795 children found a three-minute increase in sleep duration near the full moon, but a 2016 study of 5,812 children found a five-minute decrease in sleep duration near the full moon. No other modification in activity behaviors were reported, and the lead scientist concluded: "Our study provides compelling evidence that the moon does not seem to influence people's behavior." A study published in 2021 by researchers from the University of Washington, Yale University, and the National University of Quilmes showed a correlation between lunar cycles and sleep cycles. During the days preceding a full moon, people went to bed later and slept for shorter periods (in some cases with differences of up to 90 minutes), even in locations with full access to electric light. Finally, a Swedish study including one-night at-home sleep recordings from 492 women and 360 men found that men whose sleep was recorded during nights in the waxing period of the lunar cycle exhibited lower sleep efficiency and increased time awake after sleep onset compared to men whose sleep was measured during nights in the waning period. In contrast, the sleep of women remained largely unaffected by the lunar cycle. These results were robust to adjustment for chronic sleep problems and obstructive sleep apnea severity.

As for how the belief started in the first place, a 1999 study conjectures that the alleged connection of moon to lunacy might be a 'cultural fossil' from a time before the advent of outdoor lighting, when the bright light of the full moon might have induced sleep deprivation in people living outside, thereby triggering erratic behaviour in predisposed people with mental conditions such as bipolar disorder.

== Other organisms ==
=== In animals ===
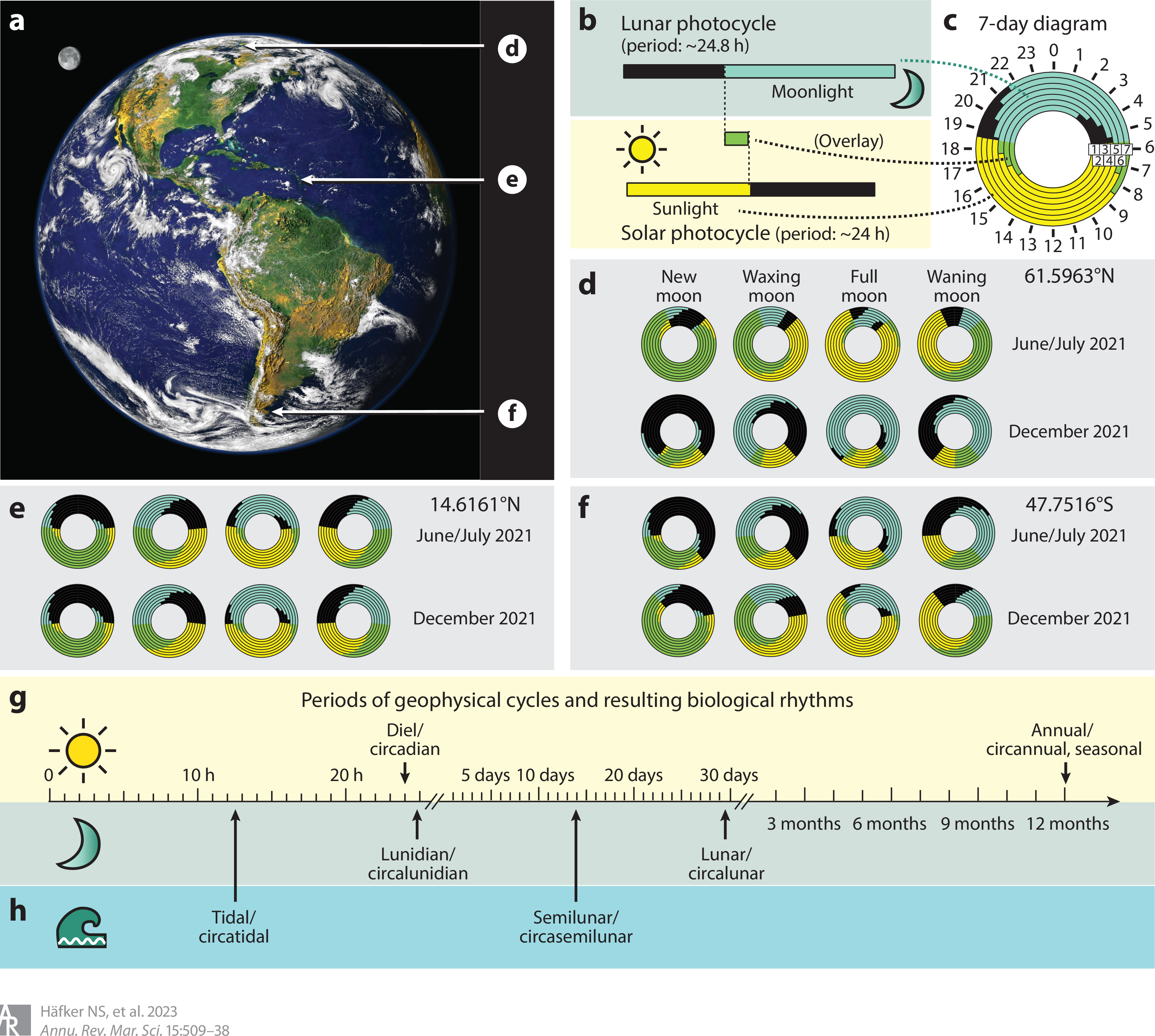
The emergence of complex rhythms from solar and lunar cycles in marine ecosystems.

Many animals use moonlight for navigation and to time behavior. As an example of lunar navigation, numerous insect species, such as moths, use moonlight to stabilize their flight paths and maintain consistent trajectories.

Corals contain light-sensitive cryptochromes, proteins that are sensitive to different levels of light. Corals at the Great Barrier Reef release their eggs and sperm simultaneously, always after full moon between October and December. Also, the Barau's petrel is known to time their mating season with the full moon.

Spawning of coral Platygyra lamellina occurs at night during the summer on a date determined by the phase of the Moon; in the Red Sea, this is the three- to five-day period around the new Moon in July and the similar period in August. Acropora coral time their simultaneous release of sperm and eggs to just one or two days a year, after sundown with a full moon. Dipsastraea speciosa tends to synchronize spawning in the evening or night, around the last quarter moon of the lunar cycle.

Another marine animal, the bristle worm Platynereis dumerilii, also spawns a few days after a full moon. It is used as a model for studying cryptochromes and photoreduction in proteins. The L-Cry protein can distinguish between sunlight and moonlight through the differential activity of two protein strands that contain light-absorbing structures called flavins. Another molecule, called r-Opsin, may act as a moonrise sensor. Exactly how different biological signals are transmitted within the worm is not yet known.

Correlation between hormonal changes in the testis and lunar periodicity was found in streamlined spinefoot (a type of fish), which spawns synchronously around the last Moon quarter. In orange-spotted spinefoot, lunar phases affect the levels of melatonin in the blood.

California grunion fish have an unusual mating and spawning ritual during the spring and summer months. The egg laying takes place on four consecutive nights, beginning on the nights of the full and new Moons, when tides are highest. This well understood reproductive strategy is related to tides, which are highest when the Sun, Earth, and Moon are aligned, i.e., at new Moon or full Moon.

The rising and falling of tides creates the Intertidal zone. Intertidal organisms experience a highly variable and often hostile environment, and have adapted to cope with and even exploit these conditions. One example are Fiddler crabs, which stay in their burrows during high tide and venture out to feed during low tide. Fiddler crabs also take advantage of tides for reproduction, and release their fertilized eggs into the receding tide.

In insects, the lunar cycle may affect hormonal changes. The body weight of honeybees peaks during new Moon. The midge Clunio marinus has a biological clock synchronized with the Moon.

Evidence for lunar effect in reptiles, birds and mammals is scant, but among reptiles marine iguanas (which live in the Galápagos Islands) time their trips to the sea in order to arrive at low tide.

A relationship between the Moon and the birth rate of cows was reported in a 2016 study.

In 2000, a retrospective study in the United Kingdom reported an association between the full moon and significant increases in animal bites to humans. The study reported that patients presenting to the A&E with injuries stemming from bites from an animal rose significantly at the time of a full moon in the period 1997–1999. The study concluded that animals have an increased inclination to bite a human during a full moon period. It did not address the question of how humans came into contact with the animals, and whether this was more likely to happen during the full moon.

=== In plants ===
Serious doubts have been raised about the claim that a species of Ephedra synchronizes its pollination peak to the full moon in July. Reviewers conclude that more research is needed to answer this question.

A growth component of the genus Sphagnum has been correlated to the lunar cycle, with accelerated growth during the new Moon. Increased cloud cover appears to disrupt this influence.

The reproduction timing of various green (Chlorophyta) and brown (Phaeophyceae) seaweed species are influenced by the lunar cycles.

== See also ==
- List of topics characterized as pseudoscience
- Human menstrual cycle
- Menstrual synchrony
- Moon in astrology – presents as a supposed lunar influence on human life
- Reproductive synchrony – breeding seasonality
- Solunar theory – animal motion oriented by the Moon
- Tide
- Vestigiality – evolutionary adaptations that no longer serve a useful purpose

== Bibliography ==
- Abell, George (1979). Review of the book The Alleged Lunar Effect by Arnold Lieber, Skeptical Inquirer, Spring 1979, 68–73. Reprinted in Science Confronts the Paranormal, edited by Kendrick Frazier, Prometheus Books, ISBN 0-87975-314-5.
- Abell, George and Barry Singer (1981). Science and the Paranormal – probing the existence of the supernatural, Charles Scribner's Sons, chapter 5, ISBN 0-684-17820-6.
- Berman, Bob (2003). Fooled by the Full Moon – Scientists search for the sober truth behind some loony ideas, Discover, September 2003, page 30.
- Caton, Dan (2001). Natality and the Moon Revisited: Do Birth Rates Depend on the Phase of the Moon?, Bulletin of the American Astronomical Society, Vol 33, No. 4, 2001, p. 1371. A summary of the results of the paper.
- Diefendorf, David (2007), Amazing... But false! Hundreds of "facts" you thought were true, but aren't, Sterling Publishing, ISBN 978-1-4027-3791-6
- Foster, Russell G.; Roenneberg, Till (2008). "Human Responses to the Geophysical Daily, Annual and Lunar Cycles". Current Biology. 18 (17): R784–R794. Bibcode:2008CBio...18.R784F. doi:10.1016/j.cub.2008.07.003. PMID 18786384. S2CID 15429616. "Lunar cycles had, and continue to have, an influence upon human culture, though despite a persistent belief that our mental health and other behaviours are modulated by the phase of the moon, there is no solid evidence that human biology is in any way regulated by the lunar cycle"
- Packer, C.; Swanson, A.; Ikanda, D.; Kushnir, H. (2011). "Fear of Darkness, the Full Moon and the Nocturnal Ecology of African Lions". PLOS ONE. 6 (7) 22285. Bibcode:2011PLoSO...622285P. doi:10.1371/journal.pone.0022285. PMC 3140494. PMID 21799812.
- Palmer, JD; Udry, JR; Morris, NM (1982). "Diurnal and weekly, but no lunar rhythms in humans copulation". Human Biology; an International Record of Research. 54 (1): 111–121. PMID 7200945.
- Sanduleak, Nicholas (1985). The Moon is Acquitted of Murder in Cleveland, Skeptical Inquirer, Spring 1985, 236–242. Reprinted in Science Confronts the Paranormal, edited by Kendrick Frazier, Prometheus Books, ISBN 0-87975-314-5.
- Zimecki, Michał (2006). "The lunar cycle: effects on human and animal behavior and physiology". Postepy Higieny I Medycyny Doswiadczalnej. 60: 1–7. PMID 16407788. Archived from the original on 26 June 2017. "In fish the lunar clock influences reproduction and involves the hypothalamus-pituitary-gonadal axis. In birds, the daily variations in melatonin and corticosterone disappear during full-moon days. The lunar cycle also exerts effects on laboratory rats with regard to taste sensitivity and the ultrastructure of pineal gland cells. Cyclic variations related to the moon's phases in the magnitude of the humoral immune response of mice to polivinylpyrrolidone and sheep erythrocytes were also described. It is suggested that melatonin and endogenous steroids may mediate the described cyclic alterations of physiological processes. The release of neurohormones may be triggered by the electromagnetic radiation and/or the gravitational pull of the moon"
