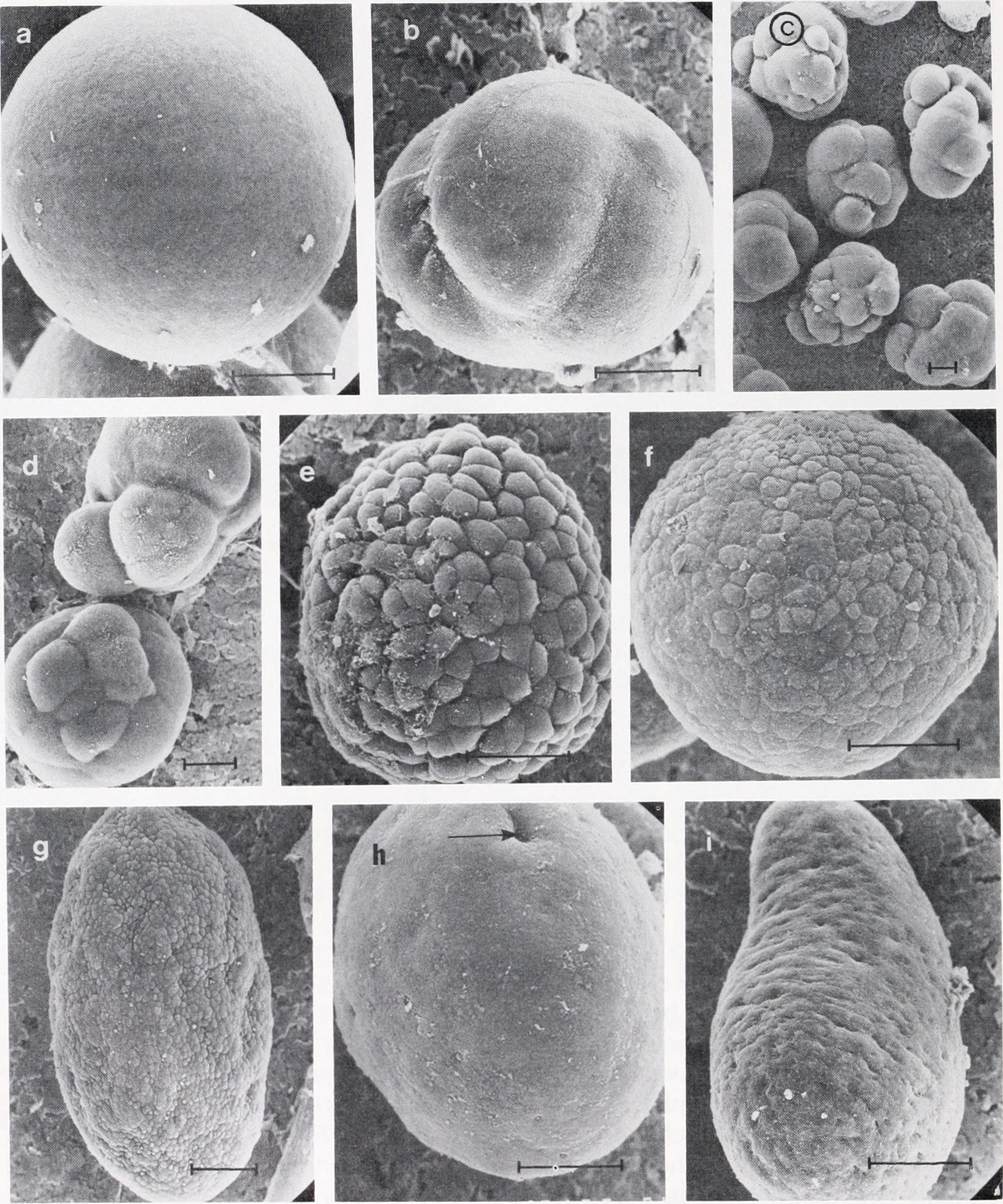
- Planula

Scientific classification
- Kingdom: Animalia
- Phylum: Cnidaria
- Subphylum: Anthozoa
- Class: Octocorallia
- Order: Malacalcyonacea
- Family: Lemnaliidae
- Genus: Rhytisma (coral)
- Species: R. fulvum

Binomial name
- Rhytisma fulvum (Forskål, 1775)

Synonyms
- Parerythropodium fulvum Forskål, 1775

= Rhytisma fulvum =

Species of coral

Rhytisma fulvum, the sulphur leather coral, is a species of colonial soft coral in the family Lemnaliidae. It is native to shallow reefs in the Red Sea and the Indo-Pacific region. It was first described by the Swedish naturalist Peter Forsskål in 1775.

== Description ==
Rhytisma fulvum is a zooxanthellate species and has two different colour morphs, yellowish-brown and grey. There is no taxonomic difference between these forms. It is an encrusting species forming sheets over the substrate which may mesh together. The polyps are small and packed together in rows, each raised on a cone-shaped peduncle.

== Distribution and habitat ==
Rhytisma fulvum is native to the Indo-Pacific region. Its range extends from the Red Sea, Zanzibar and Madagascar, to Indonesia, Papua New Guinea and the Great Barrier Reef in Australia. It is found growing on reefs at depths of between 3 and 40 m (10 and 131 ft). It is a pioneering species, being one of the first species to colonise areas where corals have died or damaged areas of reefs.

== Ecology ==
Rhytisma fulvum is a dioecious species of soft coral, colonies being either male or female. In the Red Sea, breeding takes place from late June to early August. By this time, the oocytes have been maturing for about ten months and the sperm sacs for seven months. Male colonies liberate sperm into the water column in a spawning event synchronised with the phase of the moon, with shallow-water colonies spawning earlier in the year than deep-water ones. Fertilisation takes place inside the cavities of the polyps in female colonies. The embryos are then brooded on the surface of the colony, entangled in a sticky mucus. After about six days, the planula larvae have completed their development and are liberated and soon settle on the seabed. Each polyp in a female colony produces about twenty eggs, which is a relatively low number, but this is compensated for by the brooding process which maximises the chances of the developing larvae avoiding predation.

In the Red Sea, this soft coral is often preyed on by the nudibranch Marionia levis. The appearance of this seaslug closely resembles the surface of the coral, its gills even mimicking the feeding polyps, and this makes it very well-camouflaged. Its presence is revealed if the coral is touched, because this causes the polyps to retract and the nudibranch's presence is exposed. About a quarter of the corals of this species investigated were found to harbour this nudibranch.
