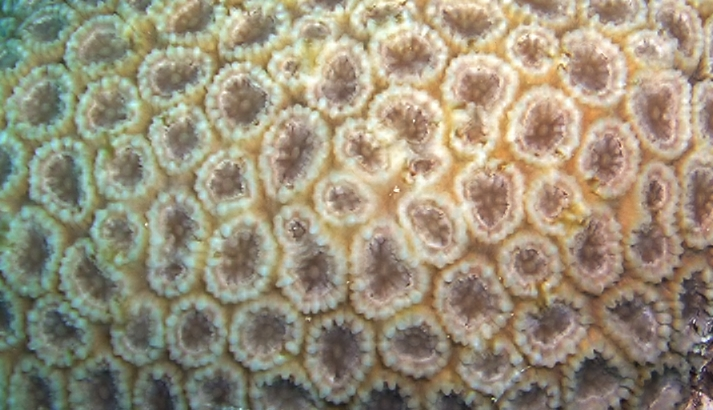
- Dipsastraea speciosa on Kingman Reef, Line Islands

Conservation status
- Least Concern (IUCN 3.1)

Scientific classification
- Kingdom: Animalia
- Phylum: Cnidaria
- Subphylum: Anthozoa
- Class: Hexacorallia
- Order: Scleractinia
- Family: Merulinidae
- Genus: Dipsastraea
- Species: D. speciosa

Binomial name
- Dipsastraea speciosa (Dana, 1846)

Synonyms
- Astrea speciosa Dana, 1846; Favia speciosa (Dana, 1846)

= Dipsastraea speciosa =

Species of coral

Dipsastraea speciosa (previously called Favia speciosa) is a species of colonial stony coral in the family Merulinidae. It is found in tropical waters of the Indian and Pacific oceans.

== Description ==
Dipsastraea speciosa has rounded to very elongated corallites, with diameters of 10 to 15 mm. The corallites are separated by broad walls, with a distance of 3 to 6 mm between individual corallites. This species can be distinguished from the more common Dipsastraea pallida, with which it has often been confused, by its septa, which are fine, numerous, and regularly spaced. Both the septa and costae have fine, evenly spaced teeth.

Colonies of Dipsastraea speciosa are massive in their growth habit. The corallites are crowded together, subcircular, with calices up to 12 mm in diameter. Their coloration ranges, including pale grey, green or brown, usually with calices of contrasting color. Colonies of Dipsastraea speciosa tend to be massive.

== Habitat ==
It is a tropical coral found in all shallow, tropical reef environments in the Indian and Pacific Oceans. It can be found at depths ranging from 0 to 40m. It can be found in all reef environments, sub-tidal on rocks, rocky reefs, outer reef channels, black and fore-slopes and in lagoons. Dipsastraea speciosa prefers waters ranging from 23° to 29 °C but can tolerate temperatures slightly above and below.

== Feeding ==
Like most other corals, they contain photosynthetic algae, called zooxanthellae. Dipsastraea speciosa and the algae have a mutualistic relationship. The algae live within the coral polyps and use sunlight to make energy. The coral provides protection and the compounds needed for photosynthesis. In return, the algae produce oxygen and help the coral to remove waste. Most importantly, the zooxanthellae supply the coral with glucose, glycerol and amino acids. The coral then uses these to make proteins, fats, and carbohydrates which help produce their calcium carbonate skeleton. The relationship between the zooxanthellae and the coral polyp creates a tight recycling of nutrients in nutrient-poor tropical waters and is the driving force behind the growth and productivity of the reef.

In addition, corals also eat through filter feeding. At night, coral polyps come out of their skeletons to feed, stretching their nematocysts to capture plankton floating by. The prey is then pulled into the polyps' mouths and digested in their stomach cavity.

== Life cycle ==
Dipsastraea speciosa is a hermaphrodite meaning they produce both sperm and egg gametes for reproduction. Mature corals use energy to produce their gametes through meiosis. Dipsastraea speciosa then release their gametes into the water column. The gametes float to the surface and external fertilization takes place. Once the egg is fertilized it becomes a zygote develops into a planktonic larva called planula and floats around the water column by currents. The planula is a type of zooplankton that is able to maneuver by cilia that cover its body. Eventually, the planula settles on a hard substrate and begins to undergo metamorphosis transforming it from a juvenile to an adult. The juvenile polyp begins to lay down a calcium carbonate corallite and begins early morphogenesis of tentacles, septa, and pharynx before larval settlement on the aboral end. Since it is a colonial coral, the polyp then goes through asexual reproduction to form more polyps, expanding the size of the coral colony and increasing the number of coral polyps.

Dipsastraea speciosa is one of the types of corals that synchronizes its time of spawning. This reproductive synchrony increases the likelihood that male and female gametes will meet. Spawning tends to take place in the evening or at night, around the last quarter moon of the lunar cycle. A full moon is equivalent to four to six hours of continuous dim light exposure, which can cause light-dependent reactions in protein. Corals contain light-sensitive cryptochromes, proteins whose light-absorbing flavin structures are sensitive to different types of light. This allows corals such as Dipsastraea speciosa to detect and respond to changes in sunlight and moonlight. Moonlight itself may actually suppress coral spawning. The most immediate cue to cause spawning appears to be the dark portion of the night between sunset and moonrise. Over the lunar cycle, moonrise shifts progressively later, occurring after sunset on the day of the full moon. The resulting dark period between day-light and night-light removes the suppressive effect of moonlight and enables coral to spawn. Light pollution desynchronizes spawning in some coral species.

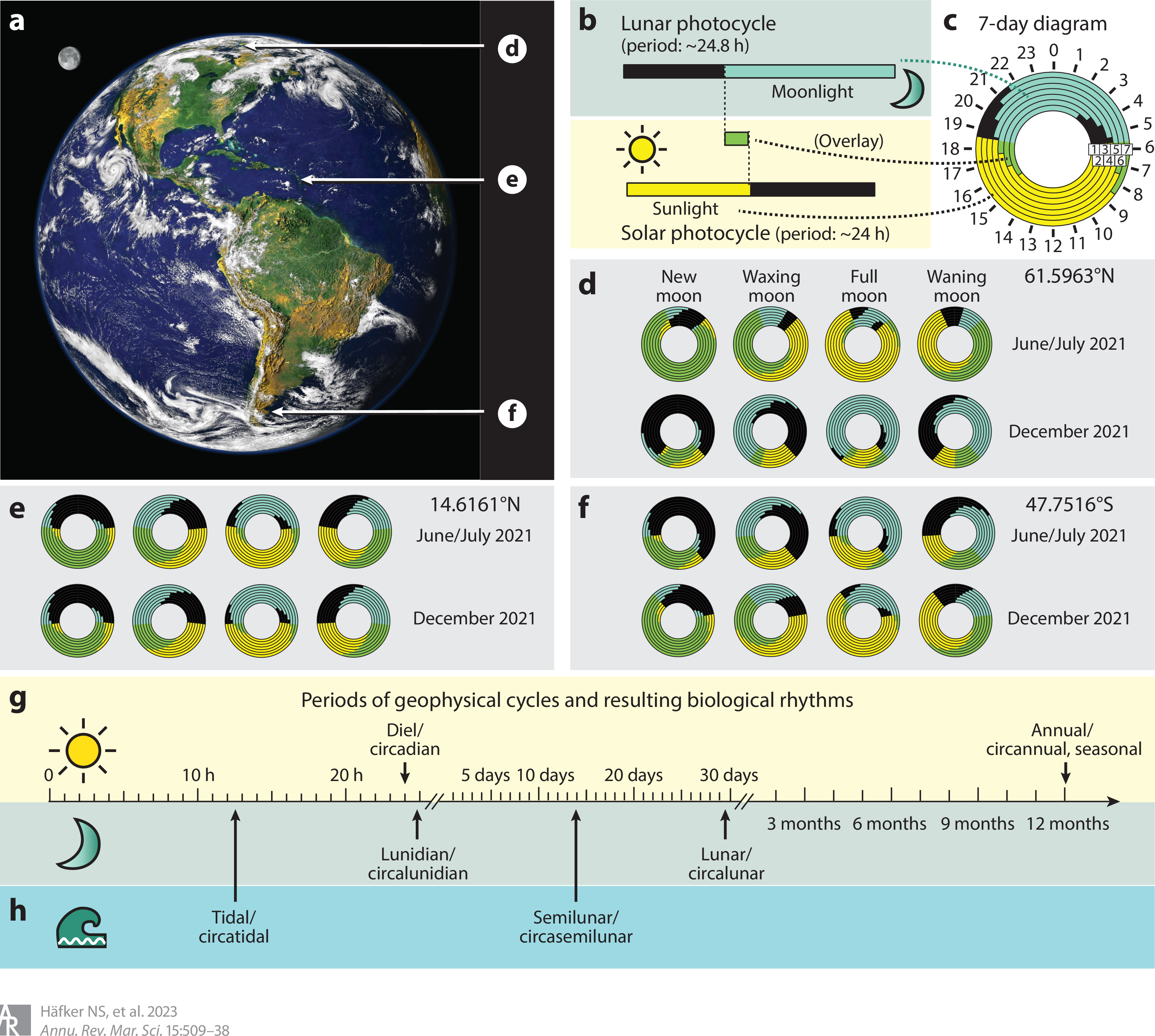
The emergence of complex rhythms from solar and lunar cycles in marine ecosystems.

== Conservation and Protection ==
Dipsastraea speciosa was cited as "Least Concern" on the IUCN Red List in January 2008 although its population trend is decreasing. It faces threats such as residential and commercial development, transportation and services through shipping lanes, fishing, and harvesting for aquatic resources like aquariums, human recreational activities, pollution such as domestic and urban wastewater and climate change. Parts of the range of Dipsastraea speciosa fall within Marine Protected Areas providing them some protection.

== Research ==
Dipsastraea speciosa is often a subject of research because it is a good indicator of the overall health of the ecosystem. It has been studied to better understand reef formation and maintenance of coral reef ecosystems and their response to changing environments. In one study, Dipsastraea speciosa was tested to see how its morphological, physiological or behavioral expression of a genotype is effected by environment-dependent variation. To test this, plastic was transplanted into corals found at shallow and deep depths. It was found that the shallow water corals showed little to no change, but the deeper corals responded by changing dramatically. The oral disks lost their bright green pigmentation and the surrounding tissues turned pale brown. This showed that plasticity in color was evident and probably light-induced.
