= Neolamprologus mustax =

Conservation status
- Least Concern (IUCN 3.1)

Scientific classification
- Kingdom: Animalia
- Phylum: Chordata
- Class: Actinopterygii
- Order: Cichliformes
- Family: Cichlidae
- Genus: Neolamprologus
- Species: N. mustax

Binomial name
- Neolamprologus mustax (Poll, 1978)

Synonyms
- Lamprologus mustax Poll, 1978

Species of fish

Neolamprologus mustax is a species of cichlid endemic to Lake Tanganyika. This species reaches a length of 9 centimetres (3.5 in) TL. It can also be found in the aquarium trade. Individuals are yellow in color and thus resemble juveniles of another cichlid species, Variabilichromis moorii, which may provide N. mustax with greater access to V. moorii feeding territories.
