= Dipsastraea =

Scientific classification
- Kingdom: Animalia
- Phylum: Cnidaria
- Subphylum: Anthozoa
- Class: Hexacorallia
- Order: Scleractinia
- Family: Merulinidae
- Genus: Dipsastraea; Blainville, 1830

Species
- See text

Synonyms
- List: Astraea (Fissicella); Barabattoia Yabe & Sugiyama, 1941 (junior synonym); Bikiniastrea Wells, 1954; Heliastraea Milne Edwards, 1857; Heliastrea Milne Edwards, 1857

Genus of corals

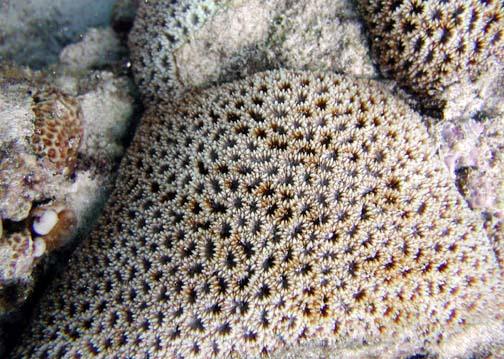
Dipsastraea pallida

Dipsastraea is a genus of stony corals in the family Merulinidae. Members of this genus are native to the Indo-Pacific region. They are zooxanthellate corals.

== Species ==
The following species are currently recognized by the World Register of Marine Species :

- Dipsastraea albida (Veron, 2000)
- Dipsastraea amicorum (Milne Edwards & Haime, 1849)
- Dipsastraea camranensis (Latypov, 2013)
- Dipsastraea danai (Milne Edwards, 1857)
- Dipsastraea faviaformis (Veron, 2000)
- Dipsastraea favus (Forskål, 1775)
- Dipsastraea helianthoides (Wells, 1954)
- Dipsastraea lacuna (Veron, Turak & DeVantier, 2000)
- Dipsastraea laddi (Wells, 1954)
- Dipsastraea laxa (Klunzinger, 1879)
- Dipsastraea lizardensis (Veron, Pichon & Wijsman-Best, 1977)
- Dipsastraea maritima (Nemezo, 1971)
- Dipsastraea marshae (Veron, 2000)
- Dipsastraea matthaii (Vaughan, 1918)
- Dipsastraea maxima (Veron, Pichon & Wijsman-Best, 1977)
- Dipsastraea modesta (Nemenzo, 1971)
- Dipsastraea pallida (Dana, 1846)
- Dipsastraea rosaria (Veron, 2000)
- Dipsastraea rotumana (Gardiner, 1899)
- Dipsastraea speciosa (Dana, 1846)
- Dipsastraea truncata (Veron, 2000)
- Dipsastraea veroni (Moll & Best, 1984)
- Dipsastraea vietnamensis (Veron, 2000)
- Dipsastraea wisseli (Scheer & Pillai, 1983)
