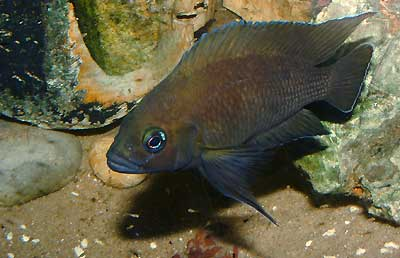

Conservation status
- Least Concern (IUCN 3.1)

Scientific classification
- Kingdom: Animalia
- Phylum: Chordata
- Class: Actinopterygii
- Division: Teleostei
- Order: Cichliformes
- Family: Cichlidae
- Subfamily: Pseudocrenilabrinae
- Tribe: Lamprologini
- Genus: Variabilichromis; Colombé & Allgayer, 1985
- Species: V. moorii

Binomial name
- Variabilichromis moorii (Boulenger, 1898)

Synonyms
- Lamprologus moorii (Boulenger, 1898); Neolamprologus moorii (Boulenger, 1898)

= Variabilichromis moorii =

Species of freshwater cichlid

Variabilichromis moorii has no common name and is a species of freshwater cichlid endemic to Lake Tanganyika in eastern Africa. It is a small ovate bodied fish named for an early collector of fish from the lake, John Edmund Sharrock Moore (1870–1947) who was a cytologist, zoologist and led an expedition to Lake Tanganyika and who discovered this species. Juveniles are usually yellow, and adults are dark brown to black in color. It reaches a total length (TL) of 10.3 centimetres (4.1 in). Currently it is the only member of its genus. V. moorii feeds on algae, zooplankton, and benthic invertebrates. It is also found in the aquarium trade.

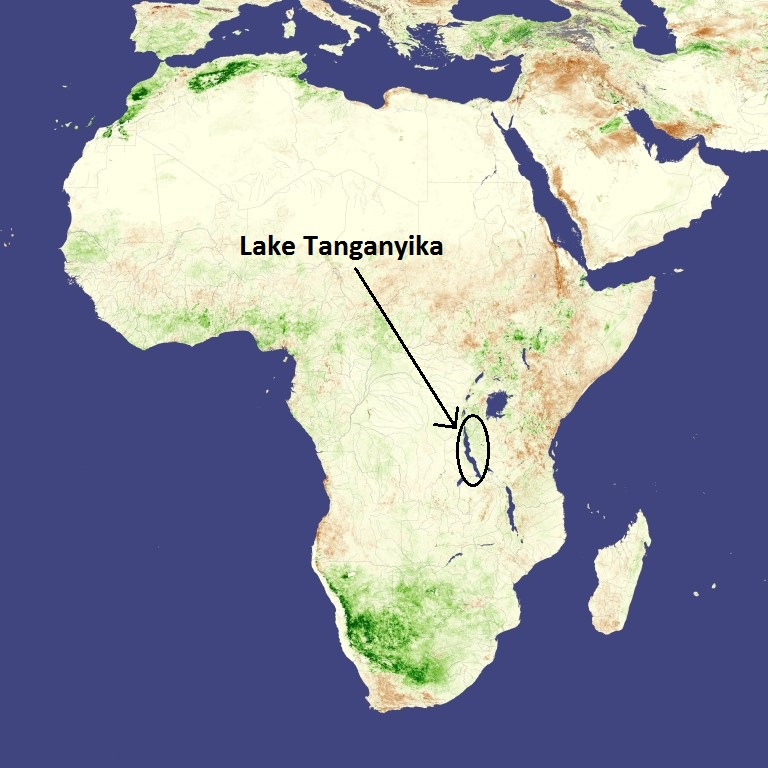
Shows Lake Tanganyika in Africa

== Taxonomy ==
V. moorii is the only member of the genus Varibilichromis, as well as a member of the tribe Lamprologini. It had previously been in the genus Neolamprologus, but in 1985, Colombé & Allgayer created the new monotypic genus Variabilichromis in order to account for a more ancestral supra-orbital bone structure. This was rejected by Poll's (1986) classification, but supported by Stiassny (1997). Stiassny's classification kept the monotypic genus due to the aforementioned bone structure, as well as the existence of two other characteristics that are rare in the tribe Lamprilogini: their diet includes filamentous algae, and females have two working ovaries.

== Morphology and coloration ==
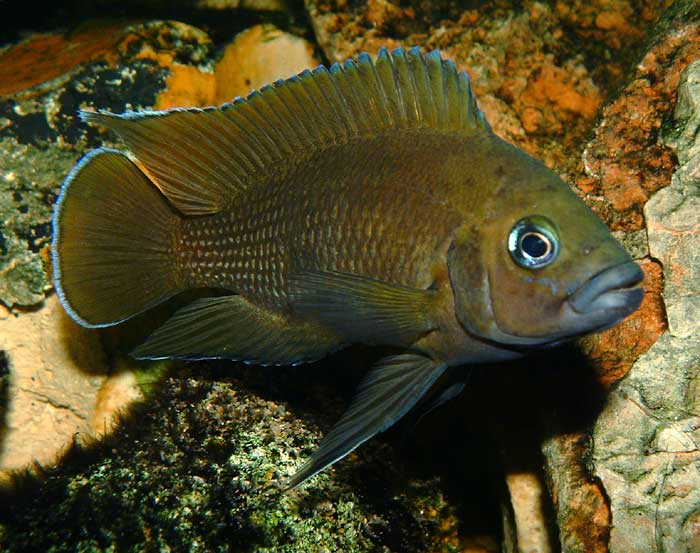
V. moorii adult, can see blue edges on fins

V. moorii exhibit sexual dimorphism as adult females tend to be larger than adult males. Adult males often have longer pelvic, dorsal, and anal fins than females do.

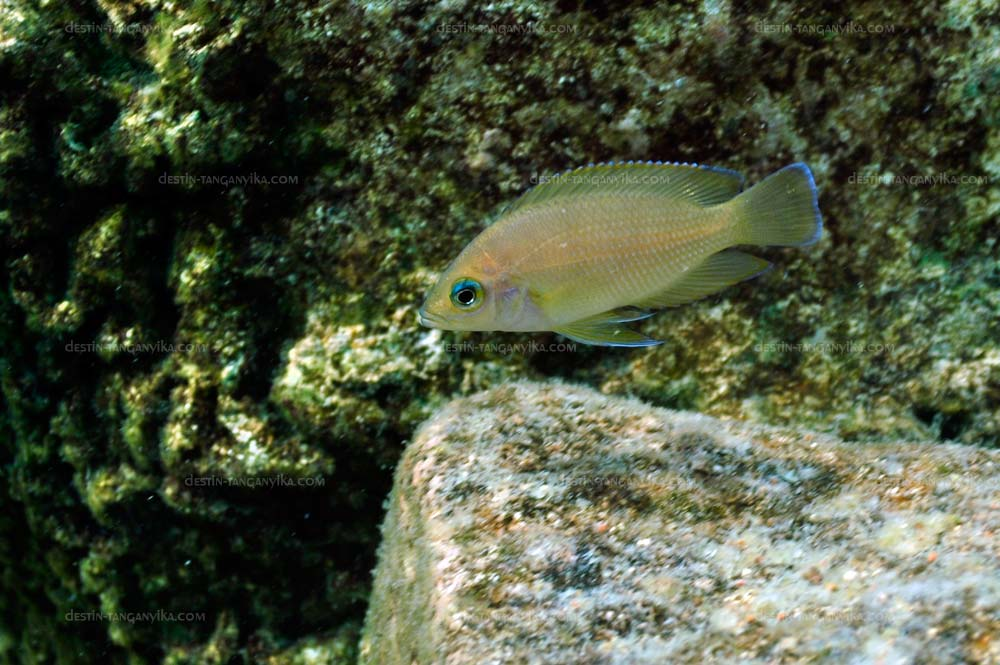
Juvenile V. moorii

Adults are black with electric blue edges on their tail, pectoral, and dorsal fins, whereas juveniles are yellow. Geographically speaking, they show little variation in color.

== Distribution and habitat ==
V. moorii is only found in the southern parts of Lake Tanganyika in Africa. They are found in rocky, relatively shallow areas in the littoral zone of the lake (less than 10 meters in depth). It is one of the most abundant species in this region of the lake.

== Breeding and mating ==
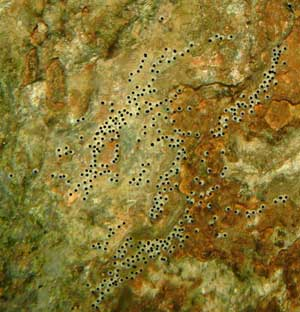
V. moorii eggs on substrate

V. moorii is a substrate-breeder, with a male and female pair providing biparental care to their eggs and the young after they hatch. This species exhibits serial monogamy, where a male and female are monogamous for at least one spawning cycle. A female lays 200–500 eggs per brood, usually under an overhanging rock or within a rock crevice. Eggs take at least 3 days to hatch and newly hatched larvae are approximately 3.62 millimetres (0.143 in) (TL). They remain in the larval stage for 4 to 5 days, attached to the substrate by their head glands. They then develop into free-swimming fry and swim in a tight school close to the spawning site. Parents may defend the brood for up to 100 days, which is when fry reach about 3.3 centimetres (1.3 in) (TL).

=== Lunar synchronicity in spawning ===
Spawning cycles in V. moorii correspond to the lunar cycle, with egg-laying taking place just before the full moon. This lunar-related reproductive periodicity is rare in freshwater organisms and far more common in organisms in marine environments. This periodicity probably evolved to decrease risk of predation when the fry are in their most vulnerable stages (as eggs and larvae), since the moon is at its brightest and the parents can best defend against nocturnal fry-eating fish. Such nocturnal predators also tend to avoid or move away from light and thus hunt less during the full moon. This lunar synchronicity confers greater benefit to V. moorii compared to other freshwater fish species because of V. moorii's location in the tropical zone where the moonlight is more intense (since it is more perpendicular to the surface) and V. moorii tend to live in shallow waters that are easily penetrated by moonlight.

=== Parasitic spawning and multiple paternity ===
V. moorii shows social but not genetic monogamy. Breeding adults spawn according to the lunar cycle and thus spawn synchronously (see Lunar synchronicity in spawning). This allows males to spawn on eggs that do not belong to the female he is mated to (also known as parasitic spawning). All offspring within a single brood share the same mother but not the same father. A study found that broods are almost always sired by multiple males (at least two but sometimes more than ten), a rate which is exceptionally high compared to other multiply mating fish. The male mated to the mother of the brood will invest significant resources to protect the territory and brood even though he did not sire the majority of the fry. The female is related to the entire brood and the male is related only to a fraction of the brood, so the female would be expected to provide more care than the male. However, there is no great difference in male parental care and female parental care.

== Defending territory ==
V. moorii have individual territories for feeding and territories shared with a mate when spawning and raising their young.

=== Feeding territories ===
Individual V. moorii territories are defended for their food resources and territory owners will defend more aggressively against individuals of species with similar diets, including conspecifics. V. moorii feeding territories in deeper areas are larger than those in shallow areas. Population density decreases with greater depth, so a large territory in a deep area can be more easily defended from competitors than a similarly sized territory in a shallow area. There is also lower algal productivity at greater depths because less light is available for photosynthesis, which also contributes to larger territories with increasing depth.

=== Breeding territories ===
V. moorii parents have a total defended territory that is several times larger than the core area (which is the area where the parents spend most of their time and where the brood is located). The male and female divide the total territory into roughly equal subterritories without much overlap, with the brood located in-between these two subterritories. The subterritory borders are not fixed and will shift throughout the day, depending on the presence of intruders. Upon seeing an intruder, a parent will quickly dart out of the core territory to chase the intruder away. The parents will attack conspecifics as well as other fish species that enter the territory. Heterospecifics are attacked far more often than conspecifics, and include both predators (such as L. elongatus and N. fasciatus) and non-predators (such as O. ventralis and T. moorii which compete with V. moorii for food). V. moorii attack fry-eating fish entering their territory more often if their brood is larger. This is reasonable because the parents have a higher rate of return on parental investment in a large brood compared to a small one. V. moorii parents attack fry-eating fish more often than other types of fish, meaning they can concentrate their defensive efforts on the fish most dangerous to their fry. Rates of attack do not decrease significantly even as fry get older and larger because the environment has high predation pressure and even older fry will be quickly eaten without defense from the parents.

==== Exploitation by Neolamprologus mustax ====
Male N. mustax

V. moorii parents typically chase away other fish that enter their territory, but they are less aggressive toward members of the cichlid species N. mustax which are yellow in color, resembling V. moorii fry. N. mustax is the only other cichlid in V. moorii's habitat which is yellow. Experiments have shown that V. moorii are more aggressive toward black fish compared to yellow fish of the same size and shape. N. mustax feed on benthic invertebrates and preferentially feed in V. moorii territories where benthic invertebrates much more abundant. This is due to V. moorii parents driving away other zoobenthivorous fish species, which often also prey on V. moorii fry. Unlike other zoobenthivorous fish, N. mustax do not prey on V. moorii fry; if they did they would certainly be driven away.
