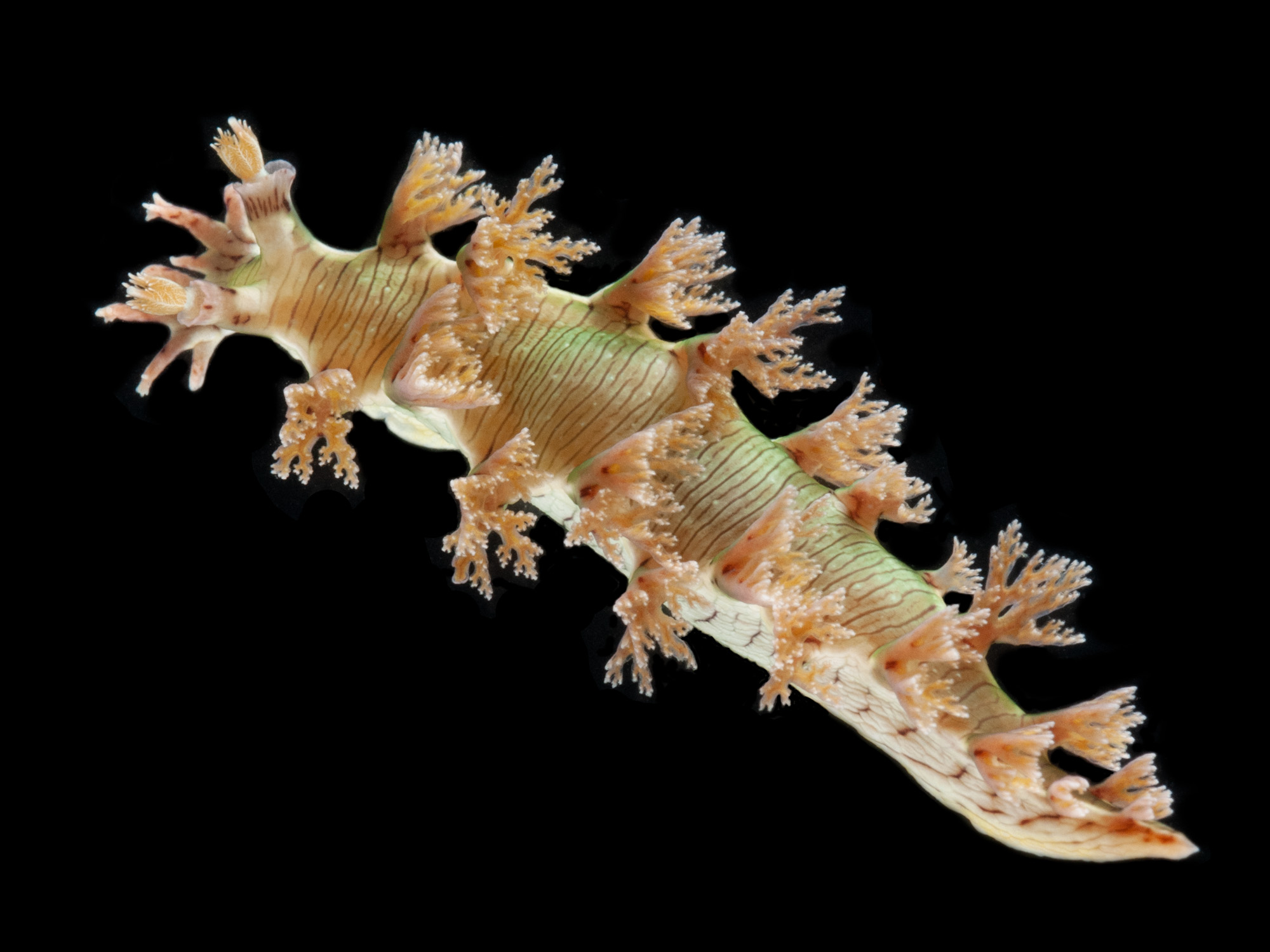
- The nudibranch Marionia levis, Kenya

Scientific classification
- Kingdom: Animalia
- Phylum: Mollusca
- Class: Gastropoda
- Order: Nudibranchia
- Suborder: Tritoniacea
- Family: Tritoniidae
- Genus: Marionia
- Species: M. levis

Binomial name
- Marionia levis Eliot, 1904

Synonyms
- Marioniopsis fulvicola Avila, Kelman, Kashman & Benahayu, 1999

= Marionia levis =

Species of gastropod

Marionia levis is a species of dendronotid nudibranch. It is a marine gastropod mollusc in the family Tritoniidae and is found in shallow water in the Red Sea and Indian Ocean.

== Taxonomy ==
Marionia levis was first described in 1904 by the marine biologist, Sir C Eliot, from Zanzibar in East Africa. Then in 1997, C. Avila et al published the first description of a new species of nudibranch from the Red Sea which they named Marioniopsis fulvicola. This was almost identical in appearance to Eliot's species but there were differences in its internal anatomy, in particular in the structure of the radula and the number of gizzard plates (150 v. 30). It seems likely that Eliot, who was working from preserved material and dealing with a large number of different nudibranchs, may have dissected a specimen from a different species. His original colour illustration is now accepted as representing the species but his anatomical information is considered problematic, and M. fulvicola is considered a synonym.

== Description ==
Marionia levis is a slender nudibranch, characterized by approximately nine pairs of gills. The odd-numbered pairs extend horizontally from the sides of the body, while the even-numbered pairs stand vertically. Its body typically exhibits hues ranging from green to brown, adorned with dark brown transverse lines, occasionally complemented by white lines or spots. The stalks of the rhinophores and of the gills bear dark brown spots. The edge of the mantle is rimmed with a low ridge, and this is usually white.

== Distribution ==
Marionia levis is found in shallow water in the Indian Ocean, its range extending from Tanzania, Kenya and the Red Sea to the Comoro Islands.

== Ecology ==
Marionia levis is found living in association with, and feeding on, the encrusting soft coral Rhytisma fulvum. The nudibranch is well-camouflaged when on the surface of its prey as it is similar in colour, and the gill clusters resemble the polyps of the soft coral. It is rendered visible if the coral is tapped. This causes the polyps to retract and exposes the no-longer-camouflaged nudibranch to view. About a quarter of the corals investigated in the Red Sea were found to harbour this nudibranch.
