= Monogamy in animals =

Natural history of mating systems in which species pair bond to raise offspring

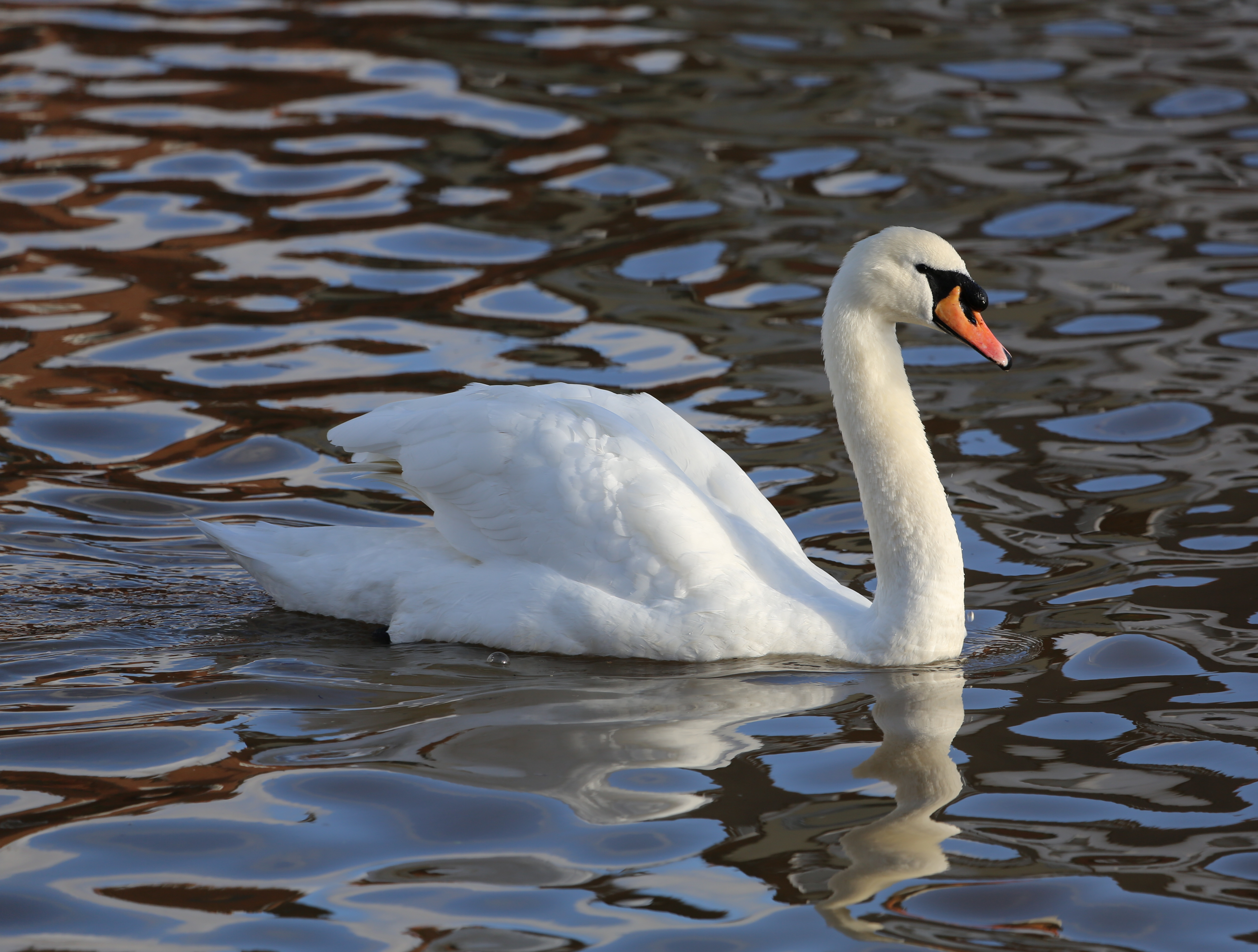
Mute swans are a socially monogamous species.

Some animal species have a monogamous mating system, in which pairs bond to raise offspring. This is not associated, particularly, with sexual monogamy.

== Monogamous mating ==
Monogamy is defined as a pair bond between two adult animals of the same species. This pair may cohabitate in an area or territory for some duration of time, and in some cases may copulate and reproduce with only each other. Monogamy may either be short-term, lasting one to a few seasons or long-term, lasting many seasons and in extreme cases, life-long. Monogamy can be partitioned into two categories, social monogamy and genetic monogamy which may occur together in some combination, or completely independently of one another. As an example, in the cichlid species Variabilichromis moorii, a monogamous pair will care for eggs and young together, but the eggs may not all be fertilized by the male giving the care. Monogamy in mammals is rather rare, only occurring in 3–9% of these species. A larger percentage of avian species are known to have monogamous relationships (about 90%), but most avian species practice social but not genetic monogamy in contrast to what was previously assumed by researchers. Monogamy is quite rare in fish and amphibians, but not unheard of, appearing in a select few species.

== Social monogamy ==
Social monogamy refers to the cohabitation of one male and one female. The two individuals may cooperate in search of resources such as food and shelter and/or in caring for young. Paternal care in monogamous species is commonly displayed through carrying, feeding, defending, and socializing offspring. With social monogamy there may not be an expected sexual fidelity between the males and the females. The existence of purely social monogamy is a polygamous or polyandrous social pair with extra pair coupling. Social monogamy has been shown to increase fitness in prairie voles. It has been shown that female prairie voles live longer when paired with males in a social monogamous relationship. This could be because of the shared energy expenditure by the males and females lower each individual's input. In largemouth bass, females are sometimes seen to exhibit cuckoo behavior by laying some of their eggs in another female's nest, thus "stealing" fertilizations from other females. Sexual conflicts that have been proposed to arise from social monogamy include infidelity and parental investment. The proposed conflict is derived from the conflict-centric differential allocation hypothesis, which states that there is a tradeoff between investment and attractiveness.

== Genetic monogamy ==
Genetic monogamy refers to a mating system in which fidelity of the bonding pair is exhibited. Though individual pairs may be genetically monogamous, no one species has been identified as fully genetically monogamous.

In some species, genetic monogamy has been enforced. Female voles have shown no difference in fecundity with genetic monogamy, but it may be enforced by males in some instances. Mate guarding is a typical tactic in monogamous species. It is present in many animal species and can sometimes be expressed in lieu of parental care by males. This may be for many reasons, including paternity assurance.

== Evolution of monogamy in animals ==
While the evolution of monogamy in animals cannot be broadly ascertained, there are several theories as to how monogamy may have evolved.

=== Anisogamy ===
Anisogamy is a form of sexual reproduction which involves the fusion of two unequally-sized gametes. In many animals, there are two sexes: the male, in which the gamete is small, motile, usually plentiful, and less energetically expensive, and the female, in which the gamete is larger, more energetically expensive, made at a lower rate, and largely immobile. Anisogamy is thought to have evolved from isogamy, the fusion of similar gametes, multiple times in many different species.

The introduction of anisogamy has caused males and females to tend to have different optimal mating strategies. This is because males may increase their fitness by mating with many females, whereas females are limited by their own fecundity. Females are therefore typically more likely to be selective in choosing mates. Monogamy is suggested to limit fitness differences, as males and females will mate in pairs. This would seem to be non-beneficial to males, but may not be in all cases. Several behaviors and ecological concerns may have led to the evolution of monogamy as a relevant mating strategy such as: partner and resource availability, enforcement, mate assistance, and territory defense.

=== Facultative monogamy ===
First introduced by Kleiman, facultative monogamy occurs when females are widely dispersed. This can either occur because females in a species tend to be solitary or because the distribution of resources available cause females to thrive when separated into distinct territories. In these instances, there is less of a chance for a given male to find multiple females to mate with. In such a case, it becomes more advantageous for a male to remain with a female, rather than seeking out another and risking (a) not finding another female and or (b) not being able to fight off another male from interfering with his offspring by mating with the female or through infanticide. In these situations, male-to-male competition is reduced and female choice is limited. The end result is that the mate choice is more random than in a more dense population, which has a number of effects including limiting dimorphism and sexual selection.

With resource availability limited, mating with multiple mates may be harder because the density of individuals is lowered. The habitat cannot sustain multiple mates, so monogamy may be more prevalent. This is because resources may be found more easily for the pair than for the individual. The argument for resource availability has been shown in many species, but in several species, once resource availability increases, monogamy is still apparent.

With increased resource availability, males may be offsetting the restriction of their fitness through several means. In instances of social monogamy, males may offset any lowered fitness through extra pair coupling. Extra pair coupling refers to male and females mating with several mates but only raising offspring with one mate. The male may not be related to all of the offspring of his main mate, but some offspring are being raised in other broods by other males and females, thereby offsetting any limitation of monogamy. Males are cuckolds, but because they have other female sexual partners, they cuckold other males and increase their own fitness. Males exhibit parental care habits in order to be an acceptable mate to the female. Any males that do not exhibit parental care would not be accepted as a sexual partner for socially monogamous females in an enforcement pattern.

=== Obligate monogamy ===
Kleiman also offered a second theory. In obligate monogamy, the driving force behind monogamy is a greater need for paternal investment. This theory assumes that without biparental care fitness level of offspring would be greatly reduced. This paternal care may or may not be equal to that of the maternal care.

Related to paternal care, some researchers have argued that infanticide is the true cause of monogamy. This theory has not garnered much support, however, and has been critiqued by several authors including Lukas and Clutton-Brock and Dixson.

== Enforcement ==
Monogamous mating may also be caused simply by enforcement through tactics such as mate guarding. In these species, the males will prevent other males from copulating with their chosen female or vice versa. Males will help to fend off other aggressive males, and keep their mate for themselves. This is not seen in all species, such as some primates, in which the female may be more dominant than the male and may not need help to avoid unwanted mating; the pair may still benefit from some form of mate assistance, however, and therefore monogamy may be enforced to ensure the assistance of males. Bi-parental care is not seen in all monogamous species, however, so this may not be the only cause of female enforcement.

== Mate assistance and territory defense ==
In species where mate guarding is not needed, there may still be a need for the pair to protect each other. An example of this would be sentinel behavior in avian species. The main advantage of sentinel behavior is that many survival tactics are improved. As stated, the male or female will act as a sentinel and signal to their mate if a predator is present. This can lead to an increase in survivorship, foraging, and incubation of eggs.

Male care for offspring is rather rare in some taxa of species. This is because males may increase their fitness by searching for multiple mates. Females are limited in fitness by their fecundity, so multiple mating does not affect their fitness to the same extent. Males have the opportunity to find a new mate earlier than females when there is internal fertilization or the females exhibit the majority of the care for the offspring. When males are shown to care for offspring as well as females, it is referred to as bi-parental care.

Bi-parental care may occur when there is a lower chance of survival of the offspring without male care. The evolution of this care has been associated with energetically expensive offspring. Bi-parental care is exhibited in many avian species. In these cases, the male has a greater chance to increase his own fitness by seeing that his offspring live long enough to reproduce. If the male is not present in these populations, the survivorship of the offspring is drastically lowered and there is a lowering in male fitness. Without monogamy, bi-parental care is less common and there is an increased chance of infanticide. Infanticide with monogamous pairing would lead to a lowered fitness for socially monogamous males and is not seen to a wide extent.

== Consequences of monogamous mating ==
Monogamy as a mating system in animals has been thought to lower levels of some pre and post copulatory competition methods. Because of this reduction in competition in some instances the regulation of certain morphological characteristics may be lowered. This would result in a vast variety of morphological and physiological differences such as sexual dimorphism and sperm quality.

== Sexual dimorphism ==
Sexual dimorphism denotes the differences in males and females of the same species. Even in animals with seemingly no morphological sexual dimorphism visible there is still dimorphism in the gametes. Among mammals, males have the smaller gametes and females have the larger gametes. As soon as the two sexes emerge the dimorphism in the gamete structures and sizes may lead to further dimorphism in the species. Sexual dimorphism is often caused through evolution in response to male male competition and female choice. In polygamous species there is a noted sexual dimorphism. The sexual dimorphism is seen typically in sexual signaling aspects of morphology. Males typically exhibit these dimorphic traits and they are typically traits which help in signaling to females or male male competition. In monogamous species sexual conflict is thought to be lessened, and typically little to no sexual dimorphism is noted as there is less ornamentation and armor. This is because there is a relaxation of sexual selection. This may have something to do with a feedback loop caused by a low population density. If sexual selection is too strenuous in a population where there is a low density the population will shrink. In the continuing generations sexual selection will become less and less relevant as mating becomes more random. A similar feedback loop is thought to occur for the sperm quality in genetically monogamous pairs.

== Sperm quality ==
Once anisogamy has emerged in a species due to gamete dimorphism there is an inherent level of competition. This could be seen as sperm competition in the very least. Sperm competition is defined as a post copulatory mode of sexual selection which causes the diversity of sperm across species. As soon as sperm and egg are the predominant mating types there is an increase in the need for the male gametes. This is because there will be a large number of unsuccessful sperm which will cost a certain level of expenditure on energy without a benefit from the individual sperm. Sperm in polygamous sexual encounters have evolved for size, speed, structure, and quantity. This competition causes selection for competitive traits which can be pre or post copulatory. In species where cryptic female choice is one of the main sources of competition females are able to choose sperm from among various male suitors. Typically the sperm of the highest quality are selected.

In genetically monogamous species it can be expected that sperm competition is absent or otherwise severely limited. There is no selection for the highest quality sperm amongst the sperm of multiple males, and copulation is more random than it is in polygamous situations. Therefore, sperm quality for monogamous species has a higher variation and lower quality sperm have been noted in several species. The lack of sperm competition is not advantageous for sperm quality. An example of this is in the Eurasian bullfinch which exhibits relaxed selection and sperm competition. The sperm of these males have a lower velocity than other closely related but polygamous passerine bird species and the amount of abnormalities in sperm structure, length, and count when compared to similar bird families is increased.

== Animals ==
The evolution of mating systems in animals has received an enormous amount of attention from biologists. This section briefly reviews three main findings about the evolution of monogamy in animals.

The amount of social monogamy in animals varies across taxa, with over 90% of birds engaging in social monogamy while only 3–9% of mammals are known to do the same.

This list is not complete. Other factors may also contribute to the evolution of social monogamy. Moreover, different sets of factors may explain the evolution of social monogamy in different species. There is no one-size-fits-all explanation of why different species evolved monogamous mating systems.

=== Sexual dimorphism ===
Sexual dimorphism refers to differences in body characteristics between females and males. A frequently studied type of sexual dimorphism is body size. For example, among mammals, males typically have larger bodies than females. In other orders, however, females have larger bodies than males. Sexual dimorphism in body size has been linked to mating behavior.

In polygynous species, males compete for control over sexual access to females. Large males have an advantage in the competition for access to females, and they consequently pass their genes along to a greater number of offspring. This eventually leads to large differences in body size between females and males. Polygynous males are often 1.5 to 2.0 times larger in size than females. In monogamous species, on the other hand, females and males have more equal access to mates, so there is little or no sexual dimorphism in body size. From a new biological point of view, monogamy could result from mate guarding and is engaged as a result of sexual conflict.

Some researchers have attempted to infer the evolution of human mating systems from the evolution of sexual dimorphism. Several studies have reported a large amount of sexual dimorphism in Australopithecus, an evolutionary ancestor of human beings that lived between 2 and 5 million years ago.

These studies raise the possibility that Australopithecus had a polygamous mating system. Sexual dimorphism then began to decrease. Studies suggest sexual dimorphism reached modern human levels around the time of Homo erectus 0.5 to 2 million years ago. This line of reasoning suggests human ancestors started out polygamous and began the transition to monogamy somewhere between 0.5 million and 2 million years ago.

Attempts to infer the evolution of monogamy based on sexual dimorphism remain controversial for three reasons:

- The skeletal remains of Australopithecus are quite fragmentary. This makes it difficult to identify the sex of the fossils. Researchers sometimes identify the sex of the fossils by their size, which, of course, can exaggerate findings of sexual dimorphism.
- Recent studies using new methods of measurement suggest Australopithecus had the same amount of sexual dimorphism as modern humans. This raises questions about the amount of sexual dimorphism in Australopithecus.
- Humans may have been partially unique in that selection pressures for sexual dimorphism might have been related to the new niches that humans were entering at the time, and how that might have interacted with potential early cultures and tool use. If these early humans had a differentiation of gender roles, with men hunting and women gathering, selection pressures in favor of increased size may have been distributed unequally between the sexes.
- Even if future studies clearly establish sexual dimorphism in Australopithecus, other studies have shown the relationship between sexual dimorphism and mating system is unreliable. Some polygamous species show little or no sexual dimorphism. Some monogamous species show a large amount of sexual dimorphism.

Studies of sexual dimorphism raise the possibility that early human ancestors were polygamous rather than monogamous. But this line of research remains highly controversial. It may be that early human ancestors showed little sexual dimorphism, and it may be that sexual dimorphism in early human ancestors had no relationship to their mating systems.

=== Testis size ===
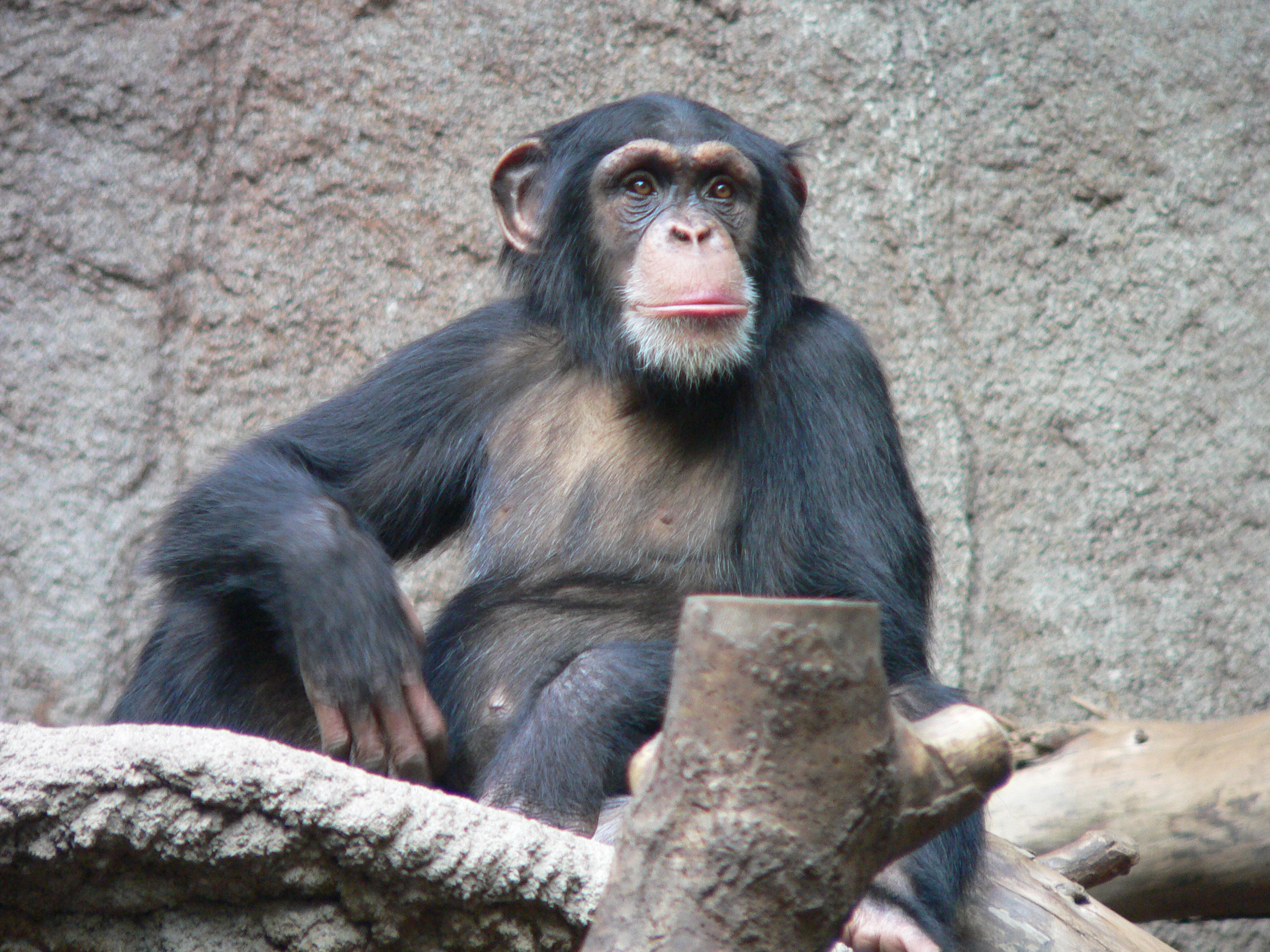
Chimpanzee

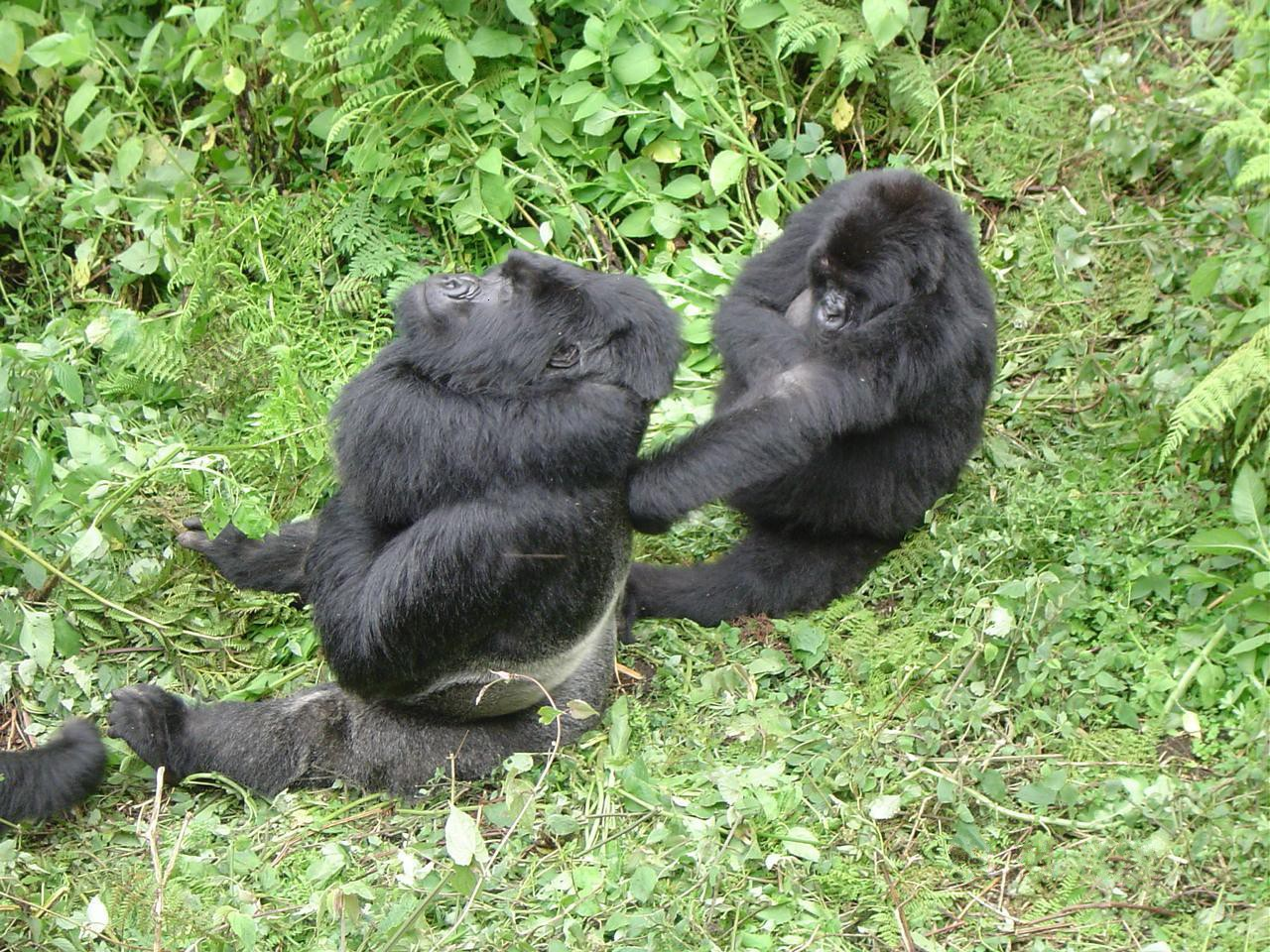
Male and female gorilla

The relative sizes of male testes often reflect mating systems. In species with promiscuous mating systems, where many males mate with many females, the testes tend to be relatively large. This appears to be the result of sperm competition. Males with large testes produce more sperm and thereby gain an advantage impregnating females. In polygynous species, where one male controls sexual access to females, the testes tend to be small. One male defends exclusive sexual access to a group of females and thereby eliminates sperm competition.

Studies of primates support the relationship between testis size and mating system. Chimpanzees, which have a promiscuous mating system, have large testes compared to other primates. Gorillas, which have a polygynous mating system, have smaller testes than other primates. Humans, which have a socially monogamous mating system, have moderately-sized testes. The moderate amounts of sexual non-monogamy in humans may result in a low to moderate amount of sperm competition.

=== Monogamy as a best response ===
In species where the young are particularly vulnerable and may benefit from protection by both parents, monogamy may be an optimal strategy. Monogamy tends to also occur when populations are small and dispersed. This is not conductive to polygamous behavior as the male would spend far more time searching for another mate. The monogamous behavior allows the male to have a mate consistently, without having to waste energy searching for other females. Furthermore, there is an apparent connection between the time a male invests in their offspring and their monogamous behavior. A male which is required to care for the offspring to ensure their survival is much more likely to exhibit monogamous behavior over one that does not.

The selection factors in favor of different mating strategies for a species of animal, however, may potentially operate on a large number of factors throughout that animal's life cycle. For instance, with many species of bear, the female will often drive a male off soon after mating, and will later guard her cubs from him. It is thought that this may be due to the fact that too many bears close to one another may deplete the food available to the relatively small but growing cubs. Monogamy may be social but rarely genetic. For example, in the cichlid species Variabilichromis moorii, a monogamous pair will care for their eggs and young but the eggs are not all fertilized by the same male. Thierry Lodé argued that monogamy should result from conflict of interest between the sexes called sexual conflict.

=== Monogamous species ===
There are species which have adopted monogamy with great success. For instance, the male prairie vole will mate exclusively with the first female he ever mates with. The vole is extremely loyal and will go as far as to even attack other females that may approach him. This type of behavior has been linked to the hormone vasopressin. This hormone is released when a male mates and cares for young. Due to this hormone's rewarding effects, the male experiences a positive feeling when they maintain a monogamous relationship. To further test this theory, the receptors that control vasopressin were placed into another species of vole that is promiscuous. After this addition, the originally unfaithful voles became monogamous with their selected partner. These very same receptors can be found in human brain, and have been found to vary at the individual level—which could explain why some human males tend to be more loyal than others.

Black vultures stay together as it is more beneficial for their young to be taken care of by both parents. They take turns incubating the eggs, and then supplying their fledglings with food. Black vultures will also attack other vultures that are participating in extra pair copulation, this is an attempt to increase monogamy and decrease promiscuous behavior. Similarly, emperor penguins also stay together to care for their young. This is due to the harshness of the Antarctic weather, predators and the scarcity of food. One parent will protect the chick, while the other finds food. However, these penguins only remain monogamous until the chick is able to go off on their own. After the chick no longer needs their care, approximately 85% of parents will part ways and typically find a new partner every breeding season.

Hornbills are a socially monogamous bird species that usually only have one mate throughout their lives, much like the prairie vole. The female will close herself up in a nest cavity, sealed with a nest plug, for two months. At this time, she will lay eggs and will be cared for by her mate. The males are willing to work to support himself, his mate, and his offspring in order for survival; however, unlike the emperor penguin, the hornbills do not find new partners each season.

It is relatively uncommon to find monogamous relationships in fish, amphibians and reptiles; however, the red-backed salamander as well as the Caribbean cleaner goby practice monogamy as well. However, the male Caribbean cleaner goby fish has been found to separate from the female suddenly, leaving her abandoned. In a study conducted by Oregon State University, it was found that this fish practices not true monogamy, but serial monogamy. This essentially means that the goby will have multiple monogamous relationships throughout its life – but only be in one relationship at a time. The red-backed salamander exhibited signs of social monogamy, which is the idea that animals form pairs to mate and raise offspring, but still will partake in extra pair copulation with various males or females in order to increase their biological fitness. This is a relatively new concept in salamanders, and has not been seen frequently – it is also concerning that the act of monogamy may inhibit the salamanders reproductive rates and biological success. However, the study which was conducted in cooperation by the University of Louisiana, Lafayette, and the University of Virginia showed that the salamanders are not inhibited by this monogamy if they show alternative strategies with other mates. The shingleback skink, Tiliqua rugosa, is one of the best studied monogamous lizards.

Azara's night monkeys are another species that proved to be monogamous. In an 18-year study conducted by the University of Pennsylvania, these monkeys proved to be entirely monogamous, exhibiting no genetic information or visual information that could lead to the assumption that extra pair copulation was occurring. This explained the question as to why the male owl monkey invested so much time in protecting and raising their own offspring. Because monogamy is often referred to as "placing all your eggs in one basket" the male wants to ensure his young survive, and thus pass on his genes.

The desert grass spider, Agelenopsis aperta, is mostly monogamous as well. Male size is the determining factor in fights over a female, with the larger male emerging as the winner since their size signifies success in future offspring.

The shrimp Spongiocaris japonica, lives inside the glass sponge Venus' flower basket. A male and a female enter through the sponge's openings as juveniles. When they are fully grown they are too large to escape, but their larvae will leave through the openings.

Other monogamous species include wolves, certain species of fox, otters, a few hooved animals, some bats, most birds, and the Eurasian beaver. This beaver is particularly interesting, as it is practicing monogamy in its reintroduction to certain parts of Europe; however, its American counterpart is not monogamous at all and often partakes in promiscuous behavior. The two species are quite similar in ecology, but American beavers tend to be less aggressive than European beavers. In this instance, the scarcity of the European beavers' population could drive its monogamous behavior; moreover, it lowers the risk of parasite transmission which is correlated with biological fitness. Monogamy is proving to be very efficient for this beaver, as their population is climbing.

== See also ==
=== Monogamy topics ===
- Animal sexual behaviour#Monogamy
- Monogamy
- Social monogamy in mammalian species
- Varieties of monogamy

=== Evolution topics ===
- Animal sexuality
- Evolution of sexual reproduction
- History of human sexuality
- Human evolution
- r/K selection theory

== Bibliography ==
- Korotayev, Andrey (2004). World Religions and Social Evolution of the Old World Oikumene Civilizations: A Cross-cultural Perspective (First ed.). Lewiston, New York: Edwin Mellen Press. ISBN 978-0-7734-6310-3.
