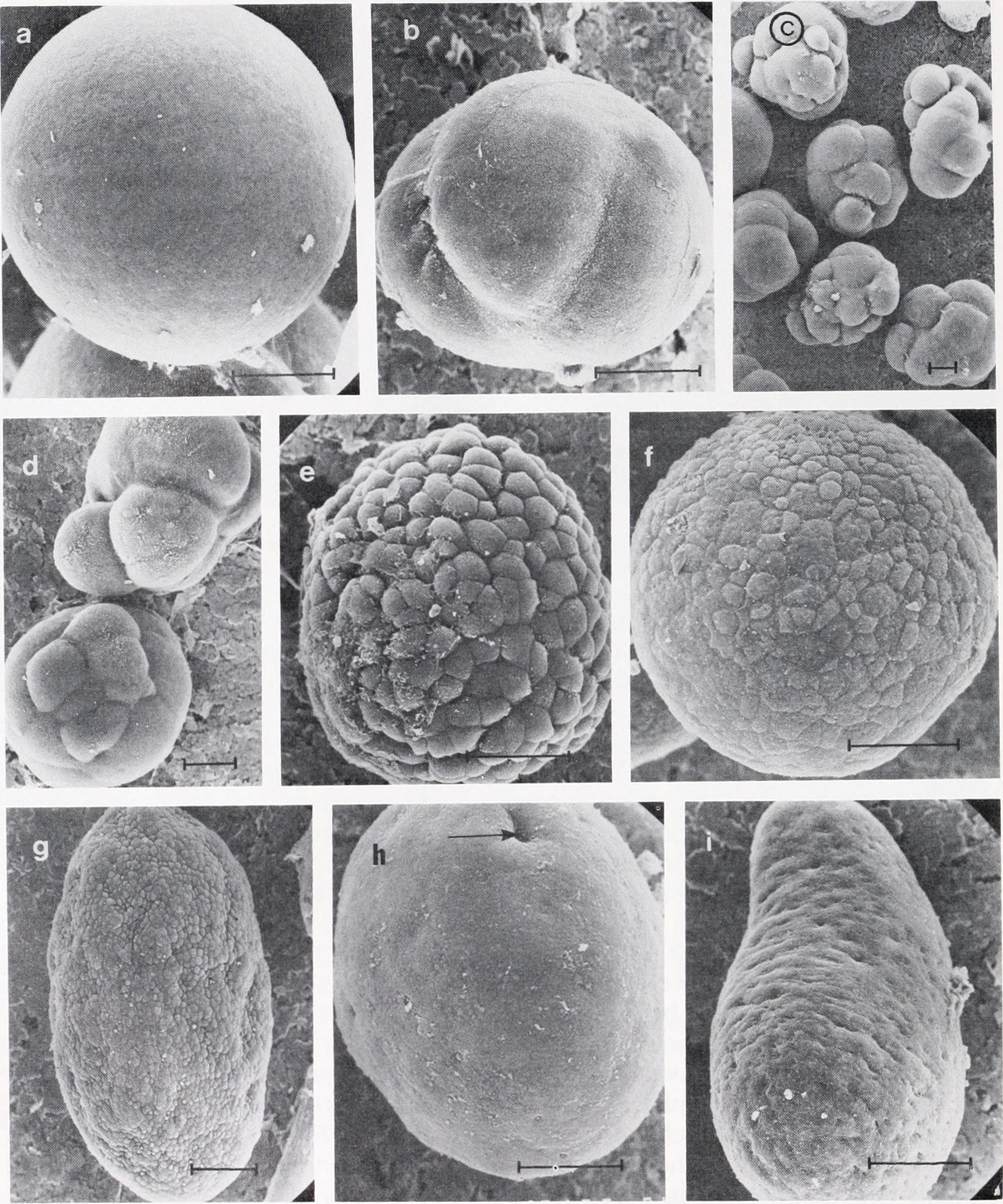
- Rhytisma fulvum

Scientific classification
- Kingdom: Animalia
- Phylum: Cnidaria
- Subphylum: Anthozoa
- Class: Octocorallia
- Order: Malacalcyonacea
- Family: Lemnaliidae
- Genus: Rhytisma (coral); Alderslade, 2000

Species
- See text

= Rhytisma (coral) =

Genus of corals

Rhytisma is a genus of soft corals that belongs to the family Lemnaliidae. This genus has a wide geographic distribution however despite its wide range, it is a relatively uncommon genus.

The best studied member of this genus is Rhytisma fulvum.

== Taxonomy ==
=== Species ===
This genus currently contains 10 species. Below is a list of species in the genus :

- Rhytisma acoronatum Samimi-Namin et al. 2026
- Rhytisma calyaceum Samimi-Namin et al. 2026
- Rhytisma fulvum- sulphur leather coral (Forskål, 1775)
- Rhytisma fuscum (Thomson & Henderson, 1906)
- Rhytisma inaequale Samimi-Namin et al. 2026
- Rhytisma karibu Samimi-Namin et al. 2026
- Rhytisma monticulum (Verseveldt, 1982)
- Rhytisma oblongum Samimi-Namin et al. 2026
- Rhytisma rubiginosum (Verseveldt, 1969)
- Rhytisma sperkolae Samimi-Namin et al. 2026

=== Taxonomic history ===
The genus used to contain four species; R. fulvum, R. fuscum, R. monticulum and R. rubiginosum. A revision of the genus in 2026 expanded the number of species to ten.
