= Solunar theory =

Hypothesis that animals move according to the moon

The solunar theory is a hypothesis that fish and other animals move according to the location of the moon in comparison to their bodies. The theory was laid out in 1926 by John Alden Knight, but was said to be used by hunters and fishermen long before the time it was published.

== History ==
In May 1926, John Alden Knight put together some fishing folklore and other fishing factors such as the sun and the moon, hence the name Solunar (Sol for sun and Lunar for moon) to form a theory on the patterns of animal movement. Knight compiled a list of factors which control or influence the day-to-day behavior of many freshwater and saltwater fish. Each one of the 33 different factors were considered. All but 3 were rejected. The three factors retained were the sun, the moon and the tide. For salt water fishing, tides have long been known as a factor that controls fishes' behavior. As Knight's research progressed, he found that rather than just tides themselves, the relationship of the moon and sun's positions relative to each other may be the determining factor. In addition to the time of moon up (moonrise) - moon down, his research determined that there were intermediate times of the day that occurred in between the two major periods. From that he established that there were major periods (moon up - moon down) and minor periods. Knight published the first Solunar table in 1936.

== Tables ==
Solunar tables are tables that fishermen and hunters use to determine the best days of the month and times of the day for catching fish and hunting game. Knowing the time of the tides, sunrise, and sunset help fishermen predict when fish are going to bite. For hunters, the tides are not a factor. Hunters use the alignment of the sun and the moon to determine when game are likely to be moving the most. Other conditions not being unfavourable, fish will feed, land animals will move about, birds will sing and fly from place to place, in theory, all living things will become more active, more alive, during solunar periods than at other times of apparent equal value. "...anglers have found that it is a guide to the best fishing of each day, and the quality of their sport has improved..." Using these tables, a fisherman and a hunter can tell when the moon is directly underfoot or overhead.

The strongest activity allegedlyoccurs when there is a full moon or a new moon, and is weakest when there is a quarter moon or a three quarter moon. These new technologies have allowed solunar theory to generate hunting and fishing times with much greater precision. Data in tables found on various websites should be reverified periodically with available US Naval Observatory data, as well as compared against other reputable solunar data providers. Inconsistencies abound due to the complex nature of the astrophysics computations and overlooked associated anomalies-checking that are required to produce useful results. Moon transits which do not occur for more than a day, or associated times being off more than a few minutes are indications of a fundamental issue for a given position and should be suspect.

== See also ==
- Lunisolar calendar
- Old Farmer's Almanac
- Tide table
- Lunar effect
