= Flushing (military tactic) =

Flushing (or Flush) is a military tactic whereby grenades, smoke, gunfire, riot control agent, chemical weapons or various other methods can be used to force opponents out from cover.

Flushing can cause opponents to leave their cover, possibly making them vulnerable to further action, or force them to take up a new position more favorable to the attacker, or disperse enemies completely. This generally makes it easier for the attacking force to deal with its opponents without unduly increasing the risk to themselves. It is mostly used in urban combat through the use of hand grenades, or in situations where defenders are dug in a fortified position, such as a bunker, behind sandbags, or hiding in buildings.
