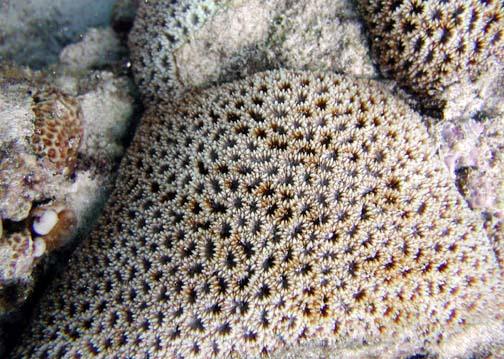

Conservation status
- Least Concern (IUCN 3.1)

Scientific classification
- Kingdom: Animalia
- Phylum: Cnidaria
- Subphylum: Anthozoa
- Class: Hexacorallia
- Order: Scleractinia
- Family: Merulinidae
- Genus: Dipsastraea
- Species: D. pallida

Binomial name
- Dipsastraea pallida (Dana, 1846)

Synonyms
- List: Astraea lobata (Milne Edwards & Haime, 1849); Astraea cellulosa Verrill, 1872; Astraea denticulata Dana, 1846; Astraea doreyensis (Milne Edwards & Haime, 1857); Astraea ordinata Verrill, 1866; Favia amplior (Milne Edwards & Haime, 1849); Favia denticulata (Dana, 1846); Favia doreyensis Milne Edwards & Haime, 1849; Favia laccadivica Gardiner, 1904; Favia okeni Milne Edwards & Haime, 1857; Favia pallida (Dana, 1846); Favia tubulifera Klunzinger, 1879; Goniastraea serrata Ortmann, 1889; Goniastrea serrata Ortmann, 1889; Heliastrea borradailei Gardiner, 1904; Parastrea amplior Milne Edwards & Haime, 1849; Parastrea verrilleana Milne Edwards & Haime, 1849

= Dipsastraea pallida =

Species of coral

Dipsastraea pallida is a species of colonial stony coral in the family Merulinidae. It is found in tropical waters of the Indian and Pacific Oceans. This is a common species of coral with a widespread distribution, and the main threat it faces is from the destruction of its coral reef habitats. It is rated as a "least-concern species" by the International Union for Conservation of Nature. This species was first described in 1846 as Favia pallida by the American zoologist James Dwight Dana; it was later transferred to the genus Dipsastraea, but some authorities continue to use the original name.

== Description ==
Dipsastraea pallida is a colonial coral forming solid rounded mounds. In shallow water, the corallites (stony cups in which the polyps sit) are circular and set closely together, while in deeper water locations, they are more scattered. The septa (radiating vertical plates forming part of the corallite wall) are widely spaced and often irregular. The palliform lobes (blades rising from the inner margins of the septa) are small. This coral is usually cream-coloured, green or pale yellow, the oral discs of the polyps often being a contrasting colour.

== Distribution and habitat ==
Dipsastraea pallida has a widespread distribution in the tropical Indian Ocean and the western Pacific Ocean. Its range extends from the East African coast, Madagascar, the Red Sea and the Gulf of Aden, through the Indian Ocean to southeastern Asia, Indonesia, the Philippines, Japan and the South China Sea, western, northern and eastern Australia and various archipelagoes in the western Pacific Ocean. It is found in various rocky reef habitats and is often the dominant species on the fringes of back reefs. It occurs at depths down to 50 m (160 ft) or more.

== Ecology ==
Dipsastraea pallida is one of several species of corals in the Indo-Pacific region that are bioeroded by the sponge Cliona orientalis, which tunnels into its skeletal structure.

== Status ==
This coral is collected for the reef aquarium trade, with a quota of around 5000 live pieces exported per annum from Indonesia, the main exporter. However, this is a common species with a wide range and presumed large total population, and the largest threats it faces come from habitat loss, climate change and ocean acidification. The International Union for Conservation of Nature has rated its conservation status as being of "least concern".
