= Reproductive synchrony =

Reproductive synchrony is a term used in evolutionary biology and behavioral ecology. Reproductive synchrony—sometimes termed "ovulatory synchrony"—may manifest itself as "breeding seasonality". Where females undergo regular menstruation, "menstrual synchrony" is another possible term.

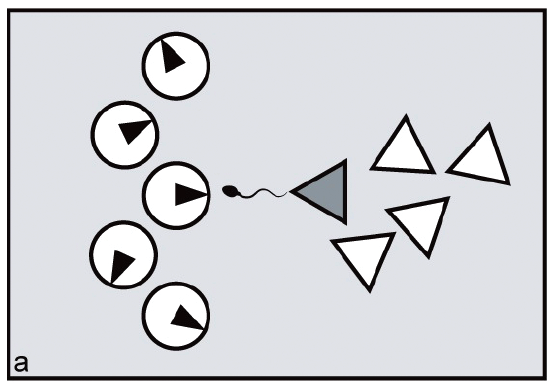
Figure a. Females competing for good genes should avoid ovulatory synchrony. Moving from one female to the next, a single dominant male under these conditions can exercise a monopoly. Key: Circle = female. Pointer = ovulation. Triangle = male.

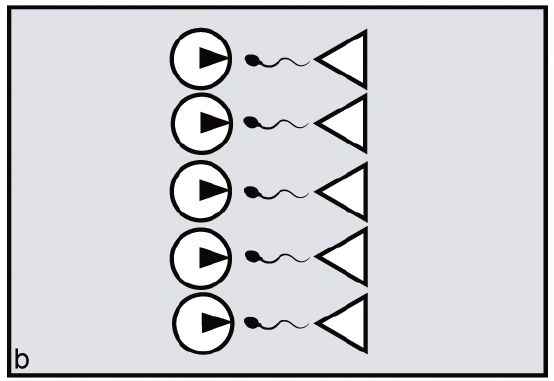
Figure b. Females in need of male time and energy should synchronise their cycles, preventing any one male from monopolising access.

Reproduction is said to be synchronised when fertile matings across a population are temporarily clustered, resulting in multiple conceptions (and consequent births) within a restricted time window. In marine and other aquatic contexts, the phenomenon may be referred to as mass spawning. Mass spawning has been observed and recorded in a large number of phyla, including in coral communities within the Great Barrier Reef.

In primates, reproductive synchrony usually takes the form of conception and birth seasonality. The regulatory "clock", in this case, is the sun's position in relation to the tilt of the earth. In nocturnal or partly nocturnal primates—for example, owl monkeys—the periodicity of the moon may also come into play. Synchrony in general is for primates an important variable determining the extent of "paternity skew"—defined as the extent to which fertile matings can be monopolised by a fraction of the population of males. The greater the precision of female reproductive synchrony—the greater the number of ovulating females who must be guarded simultaneously—the harder it is for any dominant male to succeed in monopolising a harem all to himself. This is simply because, by attending to any one fertile female, the male unavoidably leaves the others at liberty to mate with his rivals. The outcome is to distribute paternity more widely across the total male population, reducing paternity skew (figures a, b).

Reproductive synchrony can never be perfect. On the other hand, theoretical models predict that group-living species will tend to synchronise wherever females can benefit by maximising the number of males offered chances of paternity, minimising reproductive skew. For example, the cichlid fish V. moorii spawns in the days leading up to each full moon (lunar synchrony), and broods often exhibit multiple paternity. The same models predict that female primates, including evolving humans, will tend to synchronise wherever fitness benefits can be gained by securing access to multiple males. Conversely, group-living females who need to restrict paternity to a single dominant harem-holder should assist him by avoiding synchrony.

In the human case, evolving females with increasingly heavy childcare burdens would have done best by resisting attempts at harem-holding by locally dominant males. No human female needs a partner who will get her pregnant only to disappear, abandoning her in favour of his next sexual partner. To any local group of females, the more such philandering can be successfully resisted—and the greater the proportion of previously excluded males who can be included in the breeding system and persuaded to invest effort—the better. Hence scientists would expect reproductive synchrony—whether seasonal, lunar or a combination of the two—to be central to evolving human strategies of reproductive levelling, reducing paternity skew and culminating in the predominantly monogamous egalitarian norms illustrated by extant hunter-gatherers. Divergent climate regimes differentiating Neanderthal reproductive strategies from those of modern Homo sapiens have recently been analysed in these terms.

== See also ==
- Lunar effect
- Lunar phase
- Mast seeding
- Menstrual cycle
- Menstrual synchrony
- Menstruation
- Photoperiodism
- Predator satiation
- Season of birth
