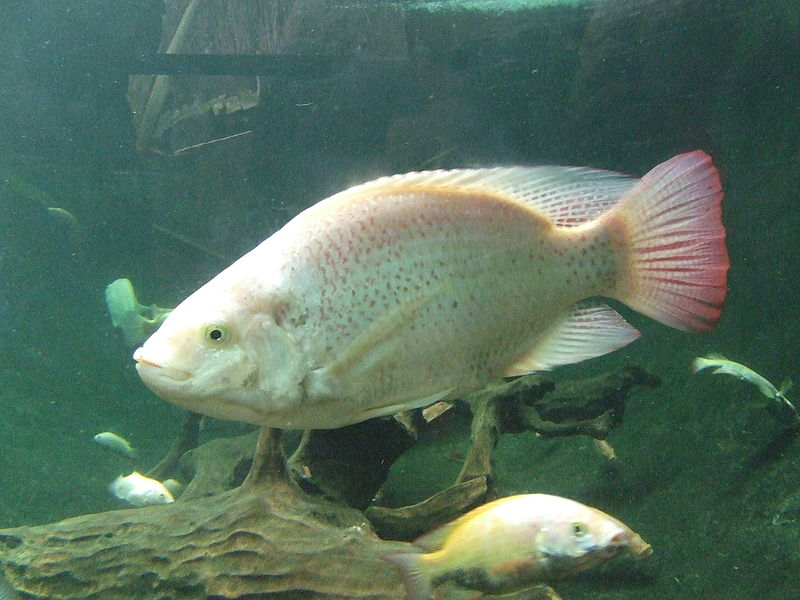
- Red tilapia, assigned to O. mossambicus

Scientific classification
- Kingdom: Animalia
- Phylum: Chordata
- Class: Actinopterygii
- Division: Teleostei
- Order: Cichliformes
- Family: Cichlidae
- Genus: Oreochromis
- Species: O. × spp.

Binomial name
- Oreochromis × spp.

= Hybrid tilapia =

Hybrid developed for aquaculture

Hybrid tilapias are crosses between different species of Oreochromis tilapias developed for aquaculture, either through natural hybridization, or more often artificially, in an effort to improve yields through improving various qualities of the fish, such as growth and hardiness. Hybrids are often divided into two varieties: gray tilapia and red tilapia, which are assigned variable binomial names based on the author, though the red hybrid is more often distinguished due to its distinct coloration.

Tilapia is an extremely important aquacultured resource; in 2022, worldwide production of tilapia (reported as Oreochromis niloticus) reached five million t (4,900,000 long tons; 5,500,000 short tons) produced from aquaculture and three hundred thousand t (300,000 long tons; 330,000 short tons) captured, ranking 5th among all aquacultured species produced behind whiteleg shrimp, cupped oysters, grass carp, and silver carp.

== Genetics ==
Hybrid tilapia are most often created through crossing Nile tilapia (Oreochromis niloticus), Mozambique tilapia (O. mossambicus), blue tilapia (O. aureus), and/or the Wami tilapia (O. hornorum), though pure Wami tilapia is considered to have poorer growth rates. The Nile tilapia is often considered the best overall in tropical aquaculture for its tolerance of dense stocking, Mozambique tilapias (and hybrids) tolerate salinities from brackish water conditions, and blue tilapias are the most cold tolerant. Hybridization is done intentionally to try achieve superior qualities in the resultant offspring (hybrid vigor); in nature, tilapias hybridize readily between species and even genera, and there are no reports of sterility in hybrids (which is often the case in hybrids of other forms of animals, such as the mule). Crossing stocks of the same species doesn't produce significant hybrid vigor, though it is useful in creating higher genetic variability for future breeding.

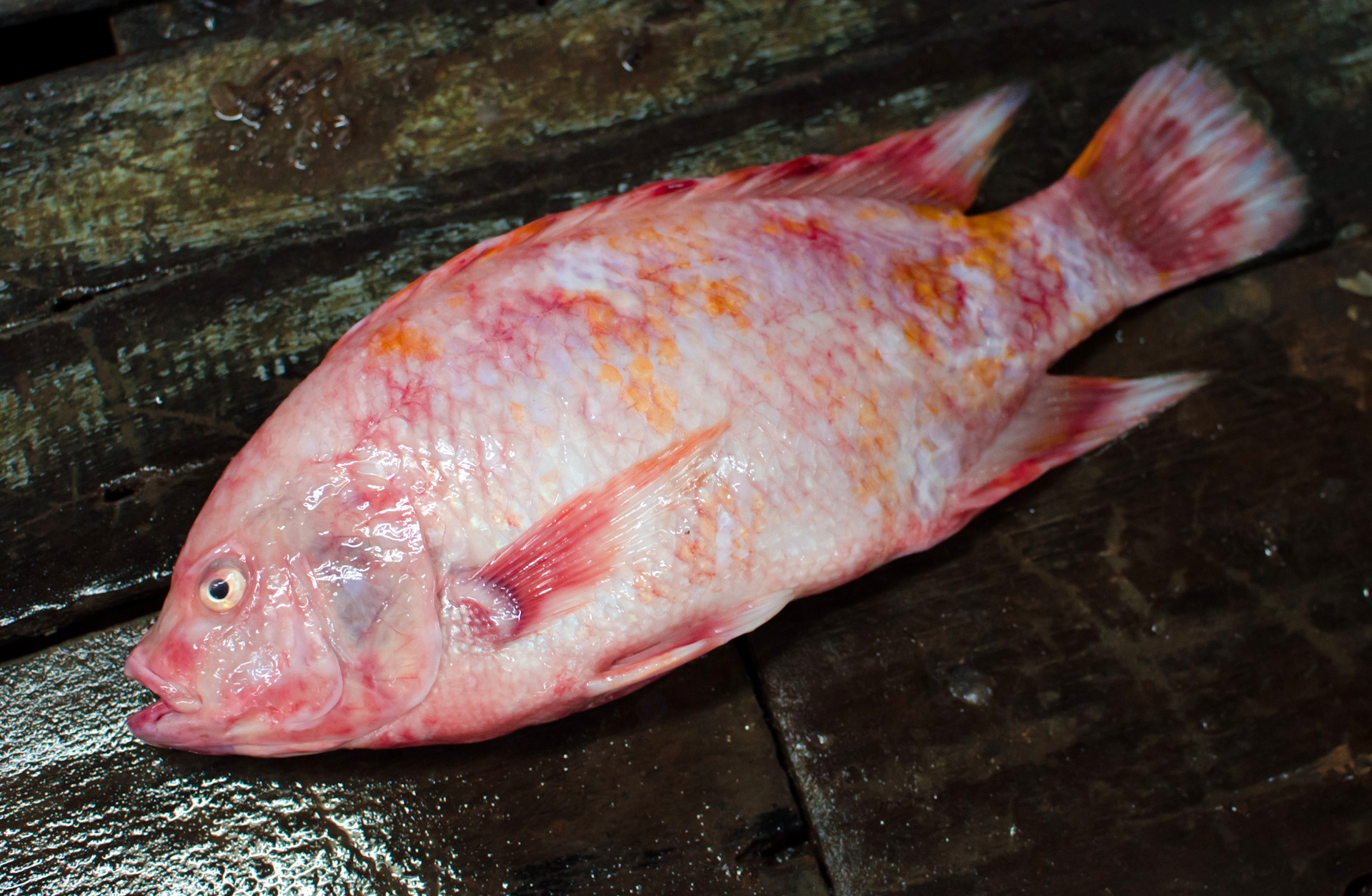
Red hybrid tilapia, or ปลาทับทิม (Pla thapthim) in Thai

Red hybrid tilapia (reported as Oreochromis mossambicus × O. niloticus, O. niloticus × O. mossambicus, O. aureus × O. mossambicus, O. spp., O. sp., or simply not given a scientific name at all) possess multiple strains; among them are Taiwanese red tilapia (reddish-orange O. mossambicus ♀ × WT O. niloticus ♂), Florida red tilapia (WT O. hornorum ♀ × red-gold O. mossambicus ♂), Israel red tilapia (red/pink Nile tilapia × WT blue tilapia), Malay red tilapia (Oreochromis niloticus × O. mossambicus), and other unknown strains originating from undocumented crosses between these "original" strains and wild type fish. Their color arises from a mutation in either or both parent, which may (F1) or may not be hybrids themselves.

Taiwanese red tilapia presumably originated from an "albino" (or leucistic) O. mossambicus; these color mutations were first noticed in 1968, 22 years after the species was first introduced in Taiwan, which started with a founding population of 12 adult fish. This strain was "fixed" by crossing O. mossambicus possessing mutant coloration with O. niloticus, which resulted in an increase of the mutant coloration in produced fry (from 30% in 1969 to 80% in 1974) along with a marked increase in yield. The strain was commercialized in 1979.

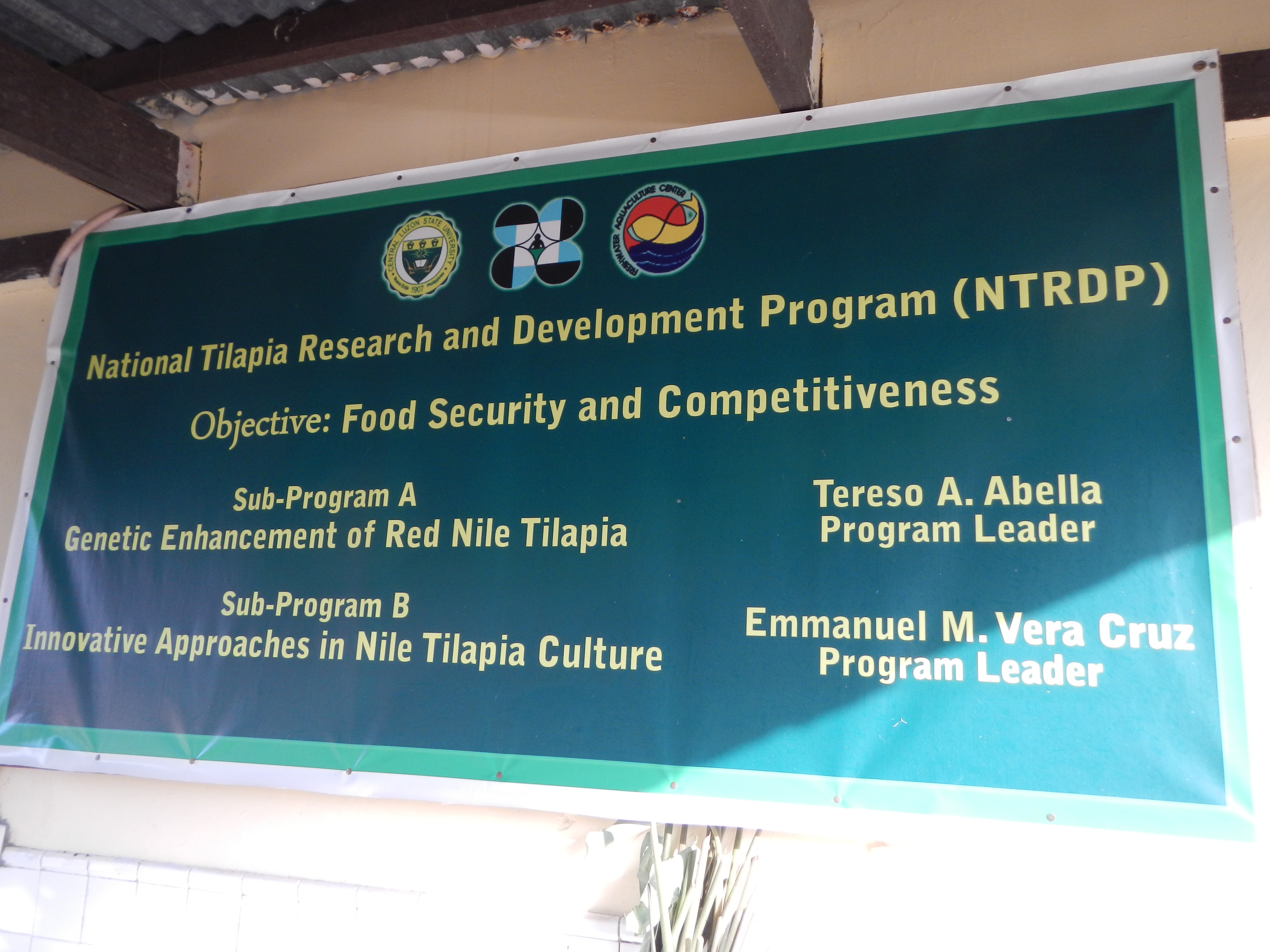
National Tilapia Research and Development Program, Philippines

Gray hybrid tilapia (reported as Oreochromis niloticus x O. aureus) are often reported as one of their parent species or not reported to be hybrids at all, as their coloration conforms more closely to the wild type, so are less distinct than the red fish.

Molobicus strain tilapias, developed in the Philippines, were developed by crossing GIFT tilapia with feral O. mossambicus.

The different strains of hybrids may be distinguished based on their morphometric characters; their genotypical difference is reflected in their phenotype. Sexual dimorphism is observed even in F2 hybrids, the expression of which is regulated by the amh gene. The dusp2, rtn4r, bhmt1, adamts12, and s100p genes are linked to growth.

YY male tilapias (sometimes referred to as "supermale tilapia") were developed in an effort to improve growth in tilapia cultures; these are produced through crossing estrogen-treated males (which become phenotypically female) with normal males, producing offspring which are phenotypically 75% male and 25% YY. Subsequent crossing of YY males with XX females produce offspring which were 99.6% males.

== Production ==
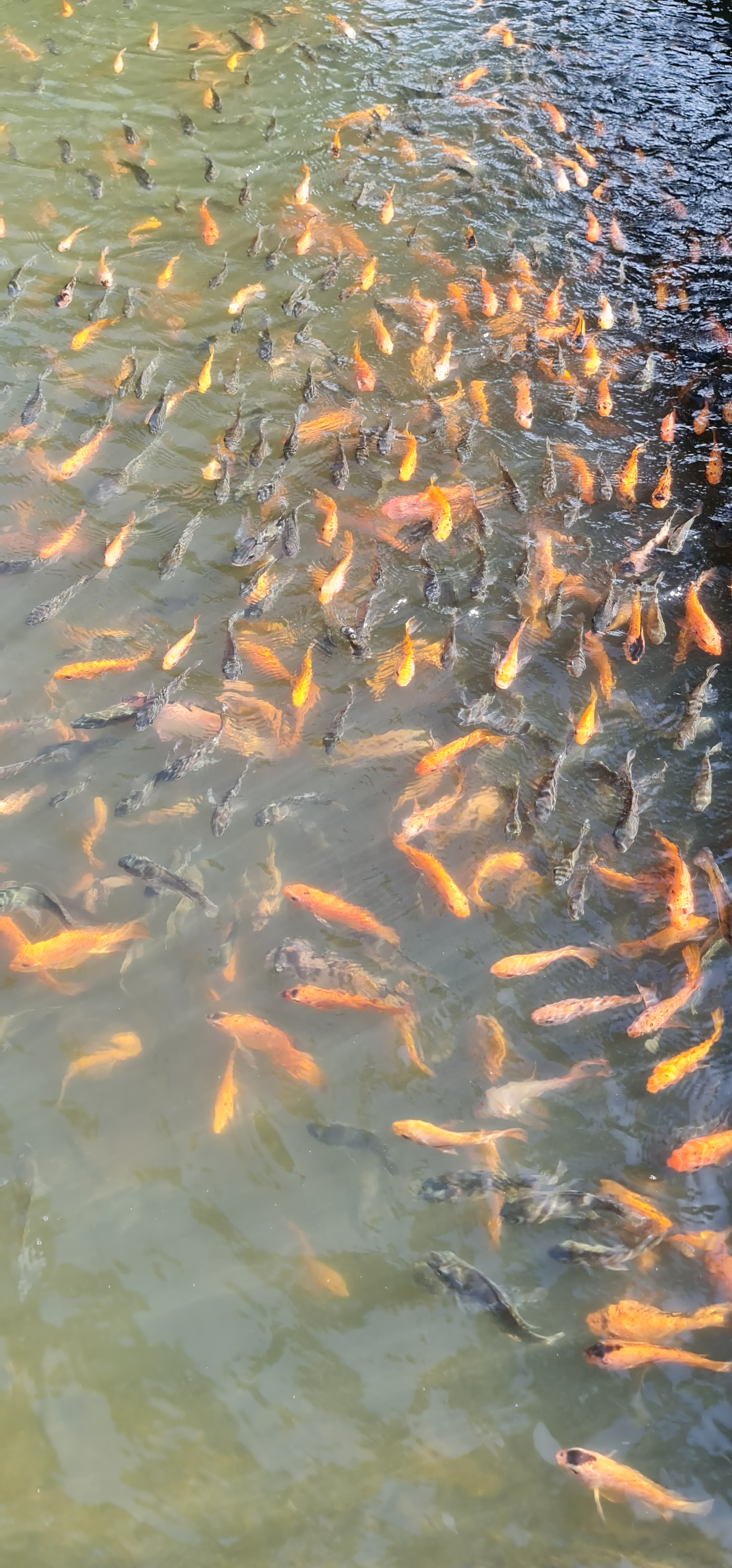
Dozens of tilapia in a pond, West Sumatra

Tilapia are aquacultured in ponds both earthen and concrete, irrigation canals, reservoirs, paddy fields, and in natural waterways, such as lakes, either released to free-roam or in floating cages. O. mossambicus and resultant hybrids may thrive in saltwater, reproducing well in salinities of 10-15 ppt, though fry do best at lower salinities. O. aureus is the most cold tolerant and can survive in waters warmer than 7 °C (45 °F); the other species perish at 11–17 °C (52–63 °F). Tilapia can tolerate dissolved oxygen levels of less than 0.3 milligrams per litre (1.7×10^{−7} oz/cu in), lower than any other farmed fish that cannot breathe air. Hybrids may be hardy, being tolerant of high salinities, high temperature, high concentrations of ammonia, and low oxygen levels, allowing them to be stocked at a high density. All members of Oreochromis including hybrids are considered mouthbrooders.

As they are omnivorous, tilapia can be fed phytoplankton, zooplankton, benthic algae, insect larvae, artificial feed, or suspended debris in the water column. They are fast growing, able to grow from 1–625 grams (0.035–22.046 oz) in 9 months, with males growing faster than females.

Care must be taken to prevent stunting, especially in high-density cultures. Methods to prevent stunting include the creation of monosex (all-male) cultures; through YY males; treating cultures with steroids/male hormones, which reverses the sex of potential female fish, crossing pure-strain Wami tilapia with either Niles or Mozambique tilapia, or crossing Nile tilapia with blues. Additionally, tilapia populations are affected by multiple diseases, which is exacerbated when the fish are densely stocked. Outbreaks may result in fish-kills. Supplementing cultured populations with various vitamins to prevent deficiency may improve growth and immunity.

The Food and Agriculture Organization (FAO) often reports the production of these hybrids as one of their parent species; they are not always distinguished from their ancestral, wild species. Additionally, production may not always be reported to the FAO. In 2015, the top producers of tilapias worldwide were China (31%, 1,779,500 t (1,751,400 long tons; 1,961,600 short tons)), Indonesia (20%, 1,120,400 t (1,102,700 long tons; 1,235,000 short tons)), Egypt (15%, 875,500 t (861,700 long tons; 965,100 short tons)), Bangladesh (324,300 t (319,200 long tons; 357,500 short tons)), and Viet Nam (283,000 t (279,000 long tons; 312,000 short tons)); worldwide, the total production of aquacultured tilapia in 2015 reached 5,671,000 t (5,581,000 long tons; 6,251,000 short tons), 68.9% of which was reported as redbreast tilapia, and 8% as hybrids between the blue and Nile tilapia. This yield was valued at $8.9 million. In 2022 worldwide production was reported at five million t (4,900,000 long tons; 5,500,000 short tons) aquacultured.

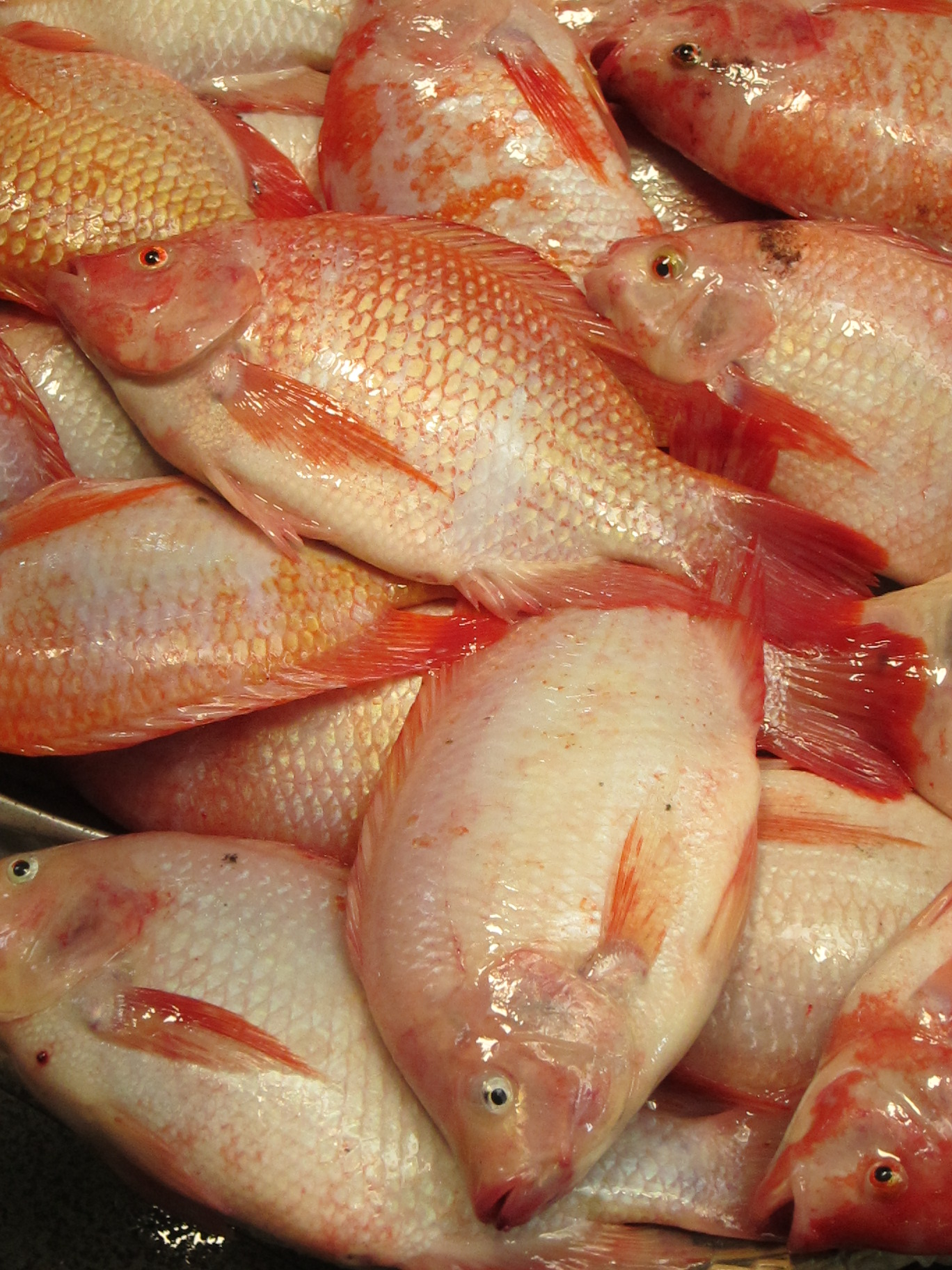
Red tilapia in a fish market, Kanchanaburi

The Maonan Tilapia Aquaculture Park (with an area of 30,100 hectares (74,000 acres)) produced 220,000 t (220,000 long tons; 240,000 short tons) of tilapia annually for 286,000 t (281,000 long tons; 315,000 short tons) of aquafeed. Farmed tilapia consists of 90% of desert-based aquaculture production in Egypt.

Red tilapia are said to be preferred by consumers as their red coloration is appealing, as they resemble red colored marine fish such as coral cod (Epinephelidae) or rockfish (Sebastinae) which are highly valued. Additionally the flavor of their meat is less "off" or muddy-flavored when raised in saltwater, which is possible with hybrids descended from O. mossambicus. The FDA outlaws the sale of steroid-treated tilapia in the United States. SeafoodWatch (a program maintained by the Monterey Bay Aquarium) deems hybrid red tilapia raised in "indoor recirculating tanks with wastewater treatment" as a "Best Choice" seafood option, while those raised in outdoor ponds are rated as a "Good Alternative".

A tilapia fillet represents about 30% of the fish, with the rest typically not consumed by humans. Collagen can be extracted from tilapia skin, which is used in the cosmetics and pharmaceutical industries.

== Environmental impact ==
Many Oreochromis species has been introduced to countries around the world, where they regularly establish breeding populations in suitable habitats (tropical and subtropical waterways with adequate salinity). The majority of species were transplanted to different areas relatively close to their native territory (i;e to other African countries), with comparatively few species being introduced to Asian and Neotropical waterways, including Taiwan red tilapia. O. mossambicus is claimed to represent the "earliest international movements of tilapiine cichlids", with a recorded appearance in Java from before 1939 (local name: mujair, taken from Mbah Moedjair's name).

Tilapia (reported as O. mossambicus) are on the IUCN's list of the 100 Worst Alien/Invasive Species in the World. Originally introduced as a protein source for impoverished rural communities, to improve fishery stocks, to provide live bait for tuna fishing, as a biocontrol agent to control aquatic weeds and mosquitoes, and for aquaculture, various tilapia species have since been naturalized in waterways of the Indo-Pacific and Neotropical regions. In the United States, tilapia of both wild species and hybrids are well recorded as being established, especially in the Southern states, Hawai'i, Puerto Rico, and Guam-Saipan. Red hybrids are common in Southeast Asian countries, such as Singapore. Overall, tilapia have been introduced to 85 countries as of 2013; in 58% of these countries tilapias are established, and cause adverse ecological effects in 14%.

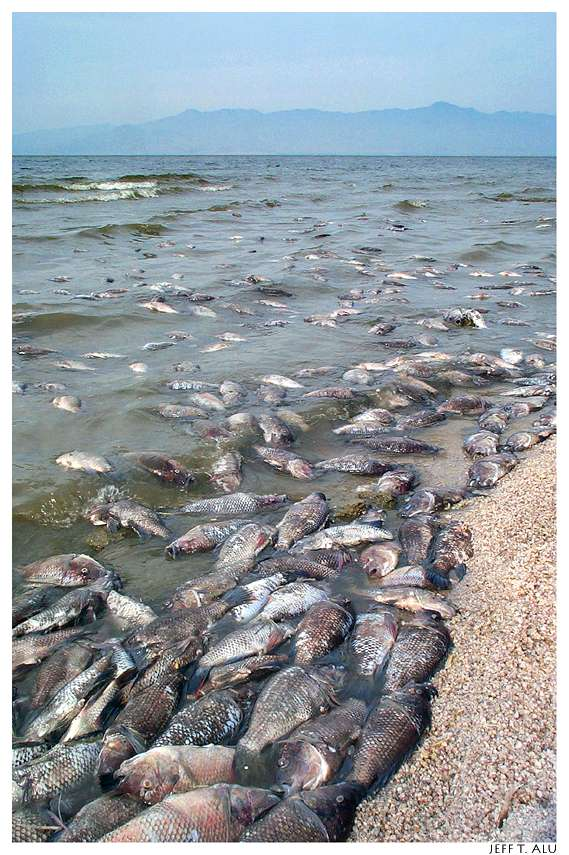
Tilapia among other dead fish, Salton Sea

Floating cage aquaculture is deemed to have an "inevitable" chance of fish escaping. Escaped tilapia, which may reproduce prolifically, are thought to compete with native species for food and space, predate on their eggs and young, destroys submerged vegetation, reduces the abundance of planktonic micro-crustaceans, reduces water quality through bioturbation, and when present in large numbers risks eutrophication, all of which endangers the native ecosystem's integrity. Large tilapia populations in a non-flowing waterway has been consistently linked to algal blooms, which subsequently cause fish kill events that kill all animals in the waterway.

In African countries, such as DR Congo, Tanzania, and Nigeria, non-native tilapia species/subspecies may contribute their genes into the native species, which may put populations and genetics of critically endangered species at risk.

In the Pearl River Basin, South China, Nile tilapia were found to disrupt the trophic levels of native herbivorous and planktivorous fish by forcing them to feed on alternate food sources, as they were outcompeted and food resources decreased in abundance. Consequently, local abundance of mudcarp (Cirrhinus molitorella), black bream (Megalobrama terminalis), barbel chub (Squaliobarbus curriculus), and sawbelly (Hemiculter leucisculus) all decreased significantly, despite previously being the dominant species caught in these rivers. Additionally, the body condition of these native fish, such as "plumpness" (girth), body length, and body weight, all decreased in rivers with introduced tilapia.

In Acari, Brazil, catches of croaker (Plagioscion squamosissimus), curimatã (Prochilodus brevis), and traíra (Hoplias malabaricus) were recorded to decrease in the 30 years after tilapia were introduced in a reservoir, without a decrease in CPUE (catch-per-unit-of-effort; amount of effort done to land fish).

Additionally, it is believed that introduced tilapia has had ecological effects in the Kafue and Zambezi basins, Australia, Madagascar, Nicaragua, the Philippines, and Mexico. Species endemic to these waterways, such as Madagascar's endemic ichthyofauna and the relict populations of wild axolotl, are likely to be impacted by tilapia introductions.

As tilapia reproduce prolifically, it is almost impossible to remove them from an ecosystem once established, and methods that may prove effective risks destroying native species as well. Tightening biosecurity measures and regulations in aquaculture operations is hoped to provide some relief.
