= Tilapia as exotic species =

Throughout much of the tropics, tilapiine cichlids native to Africa and the Levant have been widely introduced into a variety of aquatic systems. In the U.S. states of Florida and Texas, tilapia were originally introduced to curtail invasive plants. In an effort to meet the growing demand for tilapia, humans have farmed these fish in countries around the world. Capable of establishing themselves into new ponds and waterways, many tilapia have escaped aquaculture facilities across much of Asia, Africa, and South America. In other cases, tilapia have been established into new aquatic habitats via aquarists or ornamental fish farmers.

Because tilapia are generally large, fast growing, breed rapidly, and can tolerate a wide variety of water conditions (even marine environments), tilapia establish themselves into new habitats rather quickly. In doing so, tilapia often out compete native fish, create turbidity in rivers by digging, and can reduce available sun light for aquatic plants. Tilapia greatly affect and alter local habitat. Many environmental problems wrought by tilapia have been observed in different locations, including Australia, the Philippines, and the United States. The adaptability of tilapias has posed a challenge for biocontrol measures; viruses infecting tilapia have shown promise, but these viral agents require further trial to prove their safety and efficacy prior to their release into the environment.

== Tilapia by country ==
=== Australia ===
During the 1970s, tilapia were imported to Australia and introduced into the warm tributaries of North Queensland. These early introductions of tilapia were intended to act as a form of biological control, combating the growth of weeds and proliferation of mosquitos. Later genetic studies indicated that at least two separate introductions to the native creeks and rivers occurred. As early as 1979, there were established populations of spotted tilapia (Pelmatolapia mariae) and convict cichlid (Amatitlania nigrofasciata) in the cooler climate of Victoria; in a pond warmed by a power station. In 1981 they were also noted to be present in the waters of Carnarvon, Western Australia.

Ten years later, feral populations of tilapia were documented throughout Queensland and Western Australia as the geographical range of tilapia continued to increase. By 1991, waters surrounding the Queensland cities of Brisbane, Townsville, and the Gascoyne River in Western Australia were filled with Mozambique tilapia (Oreochromis mossambicus).

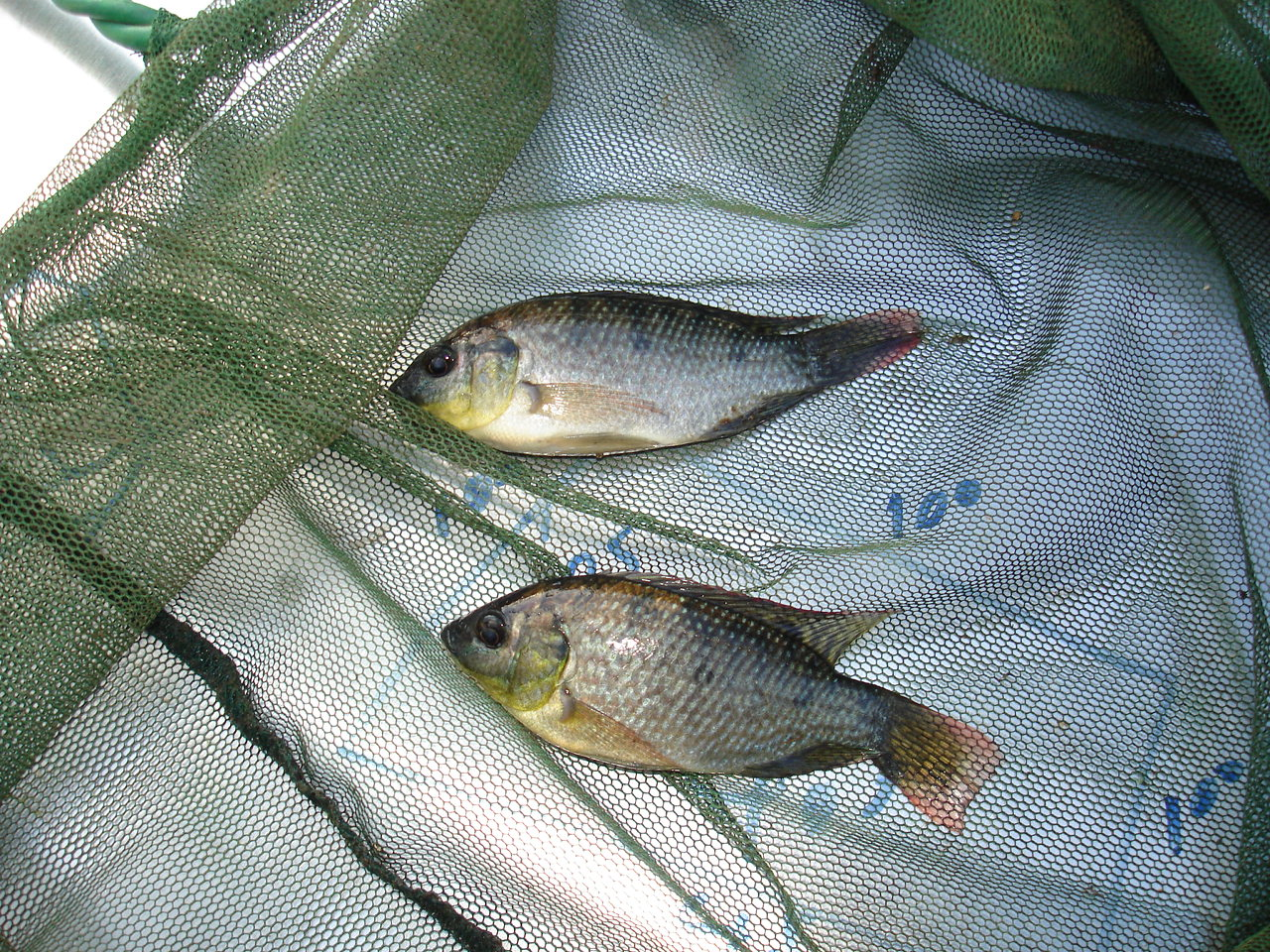
Immature Mozambique tilapia, Oreochromis mossambicus, caught in the Endeavour River, near Cooktown, Australia. Dec. 2007.

Noxious Pest

The ecological impacts of tilapia on Australian rivers, creeks and ponds have been significant. Dramatic decreases in native fish populations were, in part, due to the aggressive predation and competition for food by tilapia. Impacts on riparian habitat were further fostered by tilapia digging (increasing river turbidity) and the establishment of nests. Native fishes, invertebrates, and other organisms have experienced a reduction in stream access and cover as a result of tilapia activities.

Tilapia are listed as a noxious pest in Queensland, Australia, and are spreading rapidly into previously untouched and relatively pristine river systems such as the Endeavour River near Cooktown and the Eureka Creek. In 2017, spotted tilapia were found extending their range northward into warmer waters, in a tributary of the Mitchell River, with the potential to affect important barramundi and prawn fisheries in the Gulf of Carpentaria. There are concerns that Mozambique tilapia will invade the rivers of the Murray-Darling Basin.

As tilapia can thrive in fresh, brackish and salt water habitats, it is thought that tilapia can quickly infest neighbouring rivers. Tilapia, like eels or bull sharks, can enter new river systems via the sea.

=== Galapagos Islands, Ecuador ===
Tilapia have been introduced into Laguna Junco, a volcanic caldera in the Galapagos Islands. Within the caldera, there is an absence of native freshwater fish. Several invertebrates endemic to the Galapagos, specifically within the Laguna Junco caldera, spend all or part of their lifecycle in freshwater. The Galapagos dragonfly, is a prime example of an endemic Galapagos invertebrate. Tilapia therefore pose a significant threat to the Galapagos dragon fly and other endemic animals. As of 2007, The Ecuadorian Park Service is developing a plan to rid the Galapagos Islands of tilapia. International assistance in the form of US Aid for International Development and the US Geological Survey will supplement The Ecuadorian Park Service.

Tilapia have also been introduced to South America. In addition, many parts of Latin America house tilapia in aquaculture pens. Many of these fish have escaped and now populate riparian habitats throughout much of Latin America.

=== Indonesia ===
The Mozambique tilapia (Oreochromis mossambicus) is known as "Mujair" in Indonesia, having received its name from Moedjair who introduced this fish in the Serang River on the southern coast of Java in 1939.

=== Russia ===
A self-sustaining population the Oreochromis aureus has been reliably recorded in the Volga River basin in the area of heated water discharge from a local power plant, demonstrating its ability to survive in localized warm-water refuges.

=== Singapore ===
During World War II Oreochromis mossambicus was introduced to Singapore by the Japanese, who had brought the fish from the island of Java. Hence the fishes' local names, Japanese fish and Java fish. Tilapia were once abundant in the fresh and brackish waters off the north coast of Singapore. Since the late-1980s however, populations of feral tilapia have declined. Recently introduced cichlid hybrids (red tilapia O. mossambicus x O. niloticus, possibly also O. honorum and O. aureus) have crossbred with populations of Oreochromis mossambicus, possibly contributing to the decline. Inter-species hybrids tend to produce fewer fry per brood than spawning by fishes of the same species. In addition, hybrids classified as O. niloticus may have inherited a diminished tolerance for saline conditions, thus restricting the environments in which tilapia can be found.

=== United States ===
==== Salton Sea ====
The Salton Sea is California’s largest body of inland water. During the early twentieth century, the Colorado River overflowed into a series of irrigation canals. From 1905-1907, river water collected into the Salton Sea basin, later forming the Salton Sea.

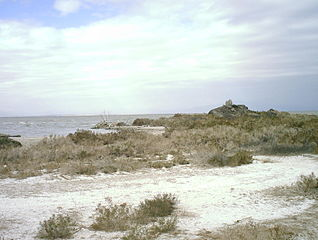
Shoreline, Salton Sea.

For the past century, river runoff and evaporation have greatly increased the salinity of the Salton Sea. Presently, the introduced tilapia (hybrid Mozambique x Wami) are the main fish that can tolerate the high salinity levels. Other tilapia, including redbelly, are present in nearby waters, but no longer able to survive the high salinity in the Salton Sea itself. The tilapia are a part of the reason for the decline in the rare native desert pupfish.

==== History of fish and fish introductions to the Salton Sea ====
Historically, the Colorado River has often flooded the Salton Sea basin. During the Pleistocene era, an ancient body of water named Lake Cahuilla was the last in a series of ancient lakes within the region. Today, ancient remnants of fish species that once lived in Lake Cahuilla can still be unearthed in the Salton Sea basin. Fossil evidence of fish species include machete (Elops affinis), bonytail (Gila robusta), and stripped mullet (Mugil Cephalus).

Several decades after the formation of the Salton Sea, The California Department of Fish and Wildlife introduced several species of oceanic fishes into the Salton Sea. These species originated from the Gulf of California and included some of the following, orangemouth corvina (Cynoscion xanthulus), bairdiella (Bairdiella icistia), sargo (Anisotremus davidsoni), and threadfin shad (Dorosoma petenense). The tilapia (Oreochromis mossambicus) was most likely introduced to the Salton Sea sometime during the 1960s. The exact time and location of tilapia introduction remains largely unknown, although speculation points to farmed tilapia escaping into the Salton Sea.

==== Tilapia diet ====
Adult members of the tilapia Oreochromis mossambicus prey upon a variety of organisms within the Salton Sea. The polychaete worm Neanthes succinea is an important part of tilapia diet. In addition to polychaete worms, adult tilapia regularly feed upon phytoplankton, copepods, smaller fishes and barnacles. Limited to smaller prey items, juvenile tilapia are dependent upon phytoplankton and small Salton Sea invertebrates. Oreochromis mossambicus is an adaptable species of tilapia. During periods of food scarcity, Oreochromis mossambicus feeds on fish waste and other detritus.

==== Avian fauna and Salton Sea tilapia ====
Oreochromis mossambicus plays an important role in the ecology of the Salton Sea. This tilapia, along with several other fish species, provides food for hundreds of birds. Many of these birds are migratory, and utilize the Salton Sea as an important destination for resting and feeding along the Pacific flyway.

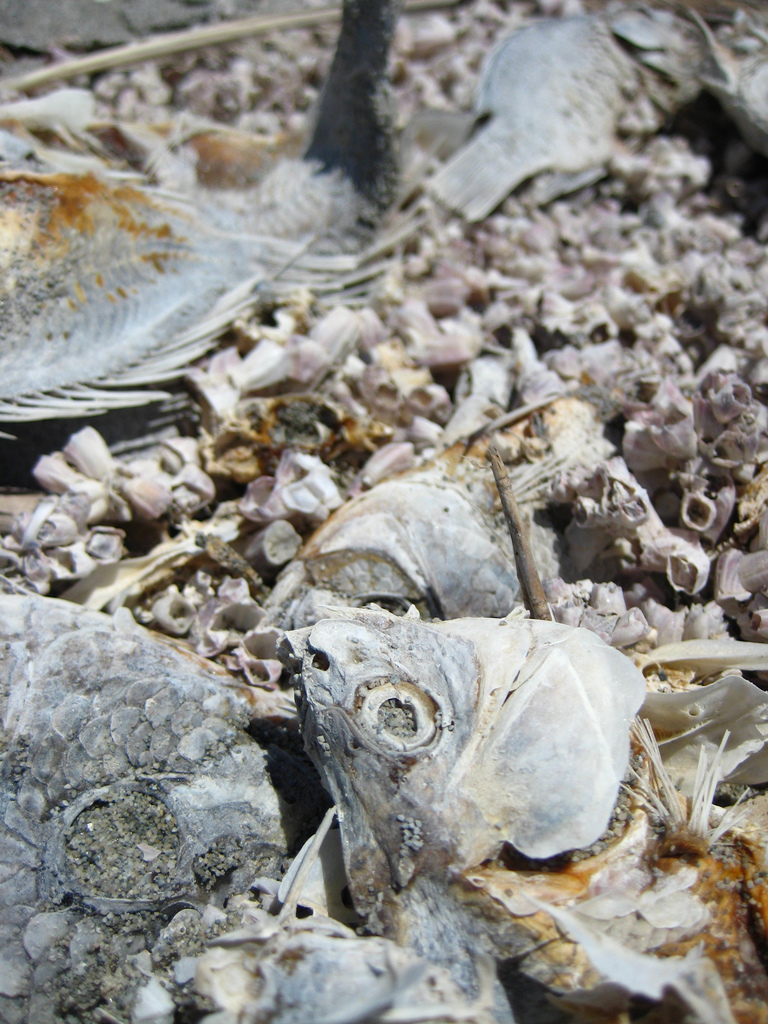
Tilapia bones, Salton Sea shoreline.

==== Washington, D.C. ====
In the District Fishing Report sent out on 21 June 2024, it was reported that an angler caught a Tilapia on a crankbait at the Jones Point Park under the Woodrow Wilson Bridge, which is on the Potomac River.

==== Environmental stresses ====
High salinity concentrations, algal blooms, agricultural runoff, hypoxia, wind events and temperature variability all contribute to fish die-offs in the Salton Sea. The high concentrations of tilapia in the Salton Sea (relative to other fish species) signify that tilapia often constitute the largest percentage of dead fishes during periods of excessive environmental stress. During fish kills, tilapia often wash ashore en masse.

== See also ==
- Invasive species
- Tilapiine cichlid
- Tilapia
- Tilapia in aquaculture
- Genus Tilapia
- Genus Sarotherodon
- Genus Oreochromis
