= Oreochromis urolepis =

Wami tilapia

Scientific classification
- Kingdom: Animalia
- Phylum: Chordata
- Class: Actinopterygii
- Order: Cichliformes
- Family: Cichlidae
- Genus: Oreochromis
- Species: O. urolepis

Binomial name
- Oreochromis urolepis (Norman, 1922)

Synonyms
- Sarotherodon urolepis (Norman, 1922); Tilapia adolfi Steindachner, 1915 (synonym); Tilapia urolepis Norman, 1922

Species of fish

The Wami tilapia (Oreochromis urolepis) or Rufiji tilapia is a species tilapiine cichlid that is native to Morogoro Region of Tanzania. It is an important food fish and has been introduced to several other countries, although most of these populations possibly are hybrids with close relatives, especially Mozambique and Nile tilapia.

This species reaches up to 44.0 cm (17.3 in) in standard length. This tilapia is found in fresh and brackish waters.

The two subspecies, geographically separated, are:

- O. u. hornorum (Trewavas, 1966) (Wami tilapia)
- O. u.urolepis (Norman, 1922) (Rufigi tilapia)
