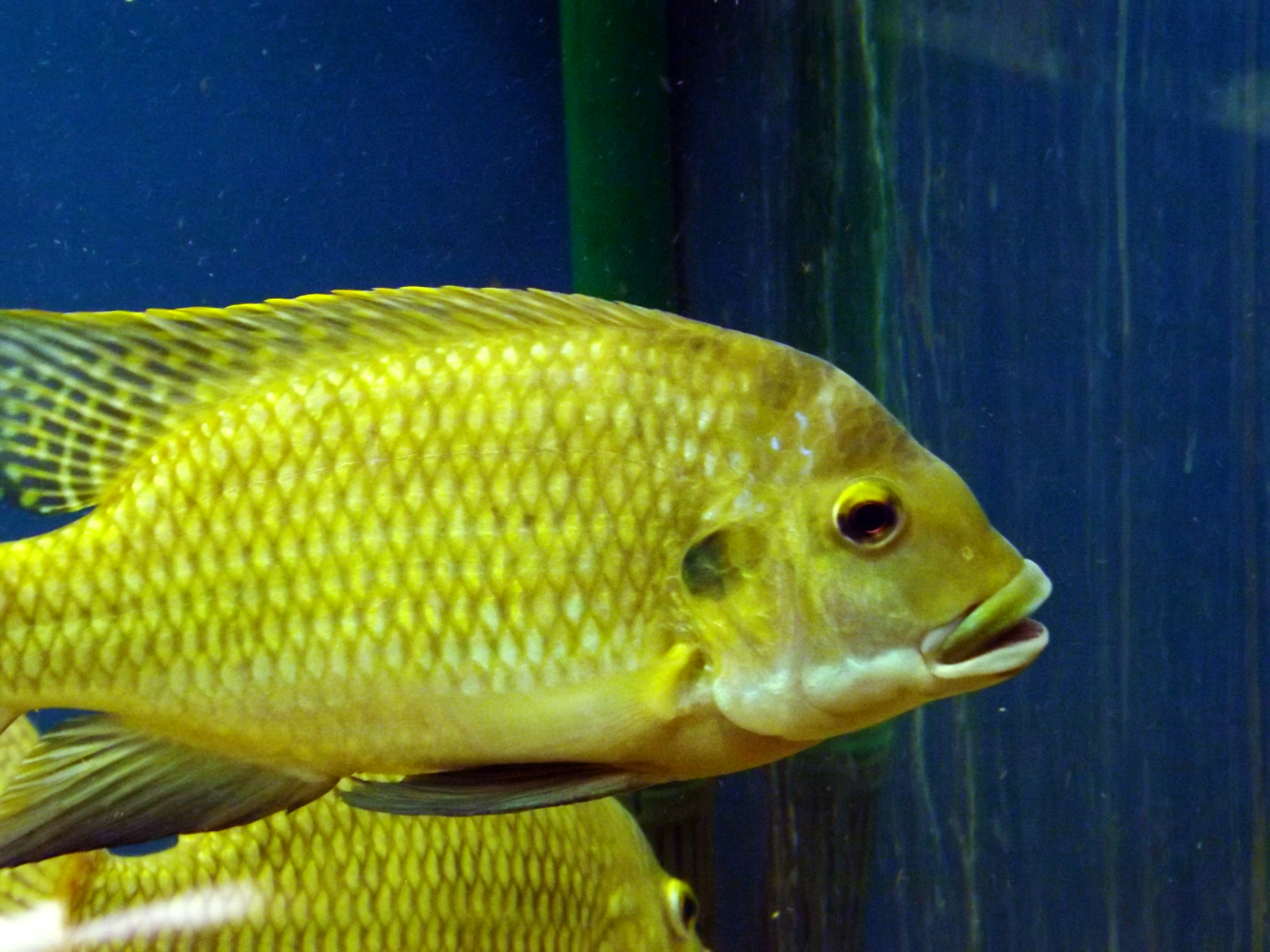

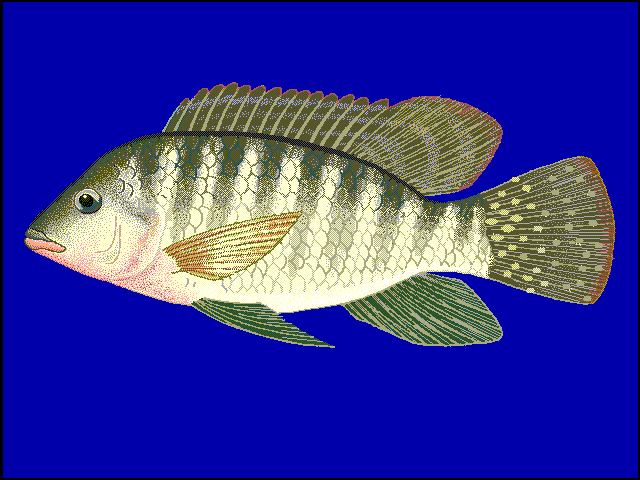

Conservation status
- Least Concern (IUCN 3.1)

Scientific classification
- Kingdom: Animalia
- Phylum: Chordata
- Class: Actinopterygii
- Order: Cichliformes
- Family: Cichlidae
- Genus: Coptodon
- Species: C. zillii

Binomial name
- Coptodon zillii (Gervais, 1848)

Synonyms
- Acerina zillii Gervais, 1848; Chromis zillii (Gervais, 1848); Coptodus zillii (Gervais, 1848); Glyphisidon zillii (Gervais, 1848); Sarotherodon zillii (Gervais, 1848); Tilapia zillii (Gervais, 1848); Haligenes tristrami Günther, 1860; Chromis tristrami (Günther, 1860); Tilapia tristrami (Günther, 1860); Tilapia melanopleura Duméril, 1861; Chromis melanopleura (Duméril, 1861); Chromis andreae Günther, 1864; Chromis coeruleomaculatus Rochebrune, 1880; Chromis faidherbii Rochebrune, 1880; Chromis menzalensis Mitchell, 1895; Tilapia menzalensis (Mitchell, 1895); Tilapia multiradiata Holly, 1928; Tilapia shariensis Fowler, 1949

= Redbelly tilapia =

Species of fish

The redbelly tilapia (Coptodon zillii, syn. Tilapia zillii), also known as the Zille's redbreast tilapia or St. Peter's fish (a name also used for other tilapia in Israel), is a species of fish in the cichlid family. This fish is found widely in fresh and brackish waters in the northern half of Africa and the Middle East. Elsewhere in Africa, Asia, Australia and North America, it has been introduced as a food fish or as a control of aquatic vegetation. Where introduced, it sometimes becomes invasive, threatening the local ecology and species. The redbelly tilapia is an important food fish and sometimes aquacultured.

The species was named by Paul Gervais in honor of M. (probably Monsieur) Zill, a "distinguished naturalist" who collected the type specimen and sent it to Gervais.

== Native distribution and taxonomy ==
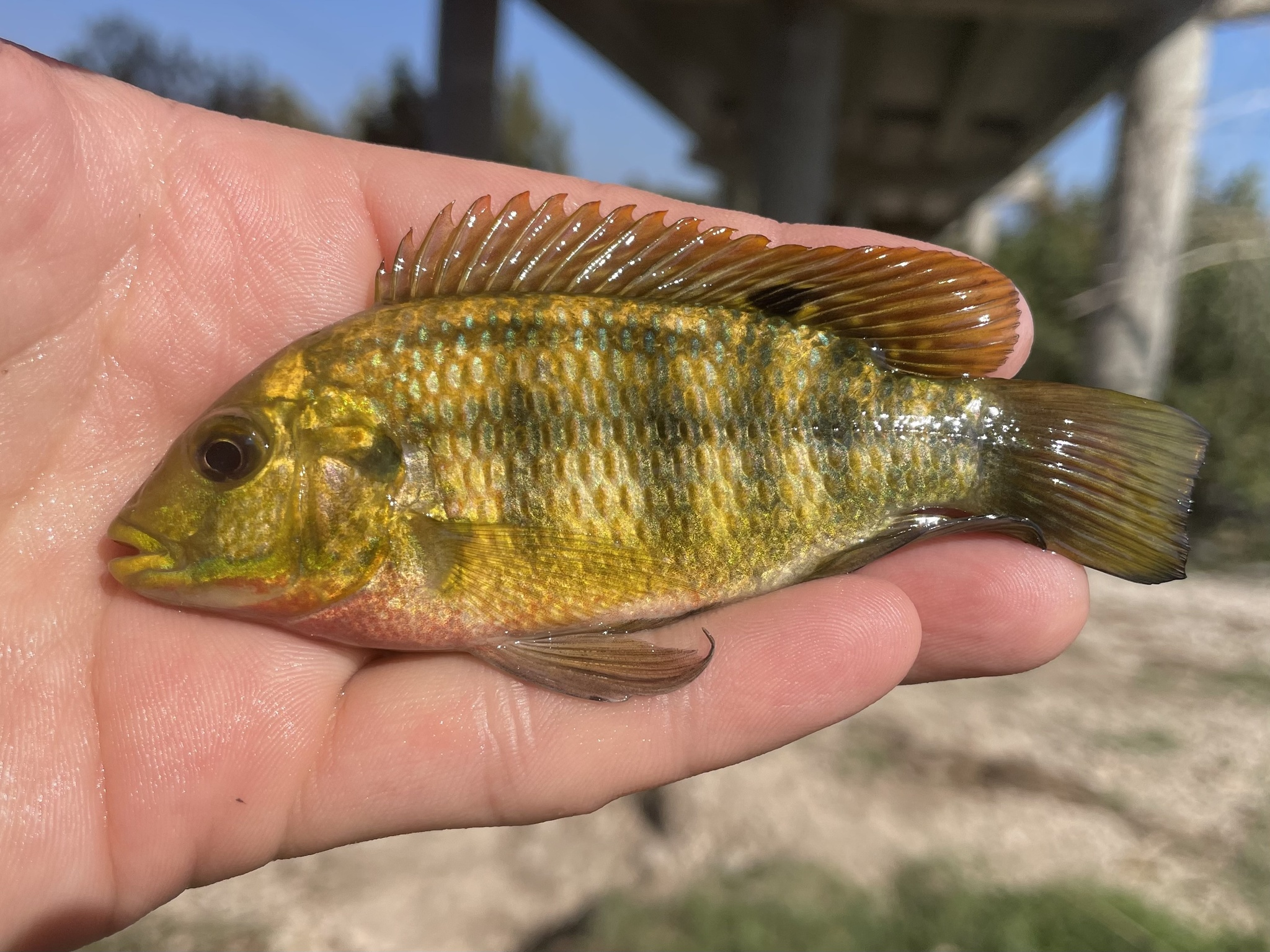
In Texas, as an introduced species.

In Africa, the native range of the redbelly tilapia covers the northern half of the continent. In tropical West to Central Africa, from coastal southern Morocco and the Senegal River to the central Congo River basin, its range is almost continuous. In northeastern Africa the redbelly tilapia occurs throughout much of the Nile basin, from its delta in northern Egypt to Lake Albert in DR Congo–Uganda, as well Lake Turkana in Ethiopia–Kenya; it is not native to the other African Great Lakes, although it has been introduced to some of them. In the Maghreb and Sahara where fewer aquatic habitats are available, the range is much more spotty but with several relict populations in seasonal rivers, lakes and oases (gueltas). Outside Africa, its natural distribution is limited to the Jordan River system, including Lake Tiberias (Kinneret), in Israel, Jordan and Syria, as well as coastal systems in Israel.

Cichlids are numerous in Africa, but in parts of the redbelly tilapia's range it is one of the few members of the family. In the Maghreb and Sahara (excluding the species-rich Nile), the only others are the blue tilapia (Oreochromis aureus) and mango tilapia (Sarotherodon galilaeus), and a couple of Astatotilapia and Hemichromis species. In Western Asia, the only other native cichlids are a few species of oreochromine tilapias and the Jordan mouthbrooder (Astatotilapia flaviijosephi).

Although genetic studies have shown that most populations of the redbelly tilapia are very closely related, a few from the outer margins of its range are of questionable taxonomic status and require further study. A population in the Kisangani region, although closely related, appears to be separate. Similarly, those found in coastal northwestern Africa are genetically quite distinct from the other populations. In the Nile system, it has been observed that populations in its delta, the northern White Nile and lakes near Fayum differ from each other in morphology and colors, but whether this is taxonomically significant is unclear. In contrast, the virtually unknown C. ismailiaensis of northeastern Egypt might only be an aberrant redbelly tilapia; it primarily differs in its unspotted tail.

== Habitat and ecology ==
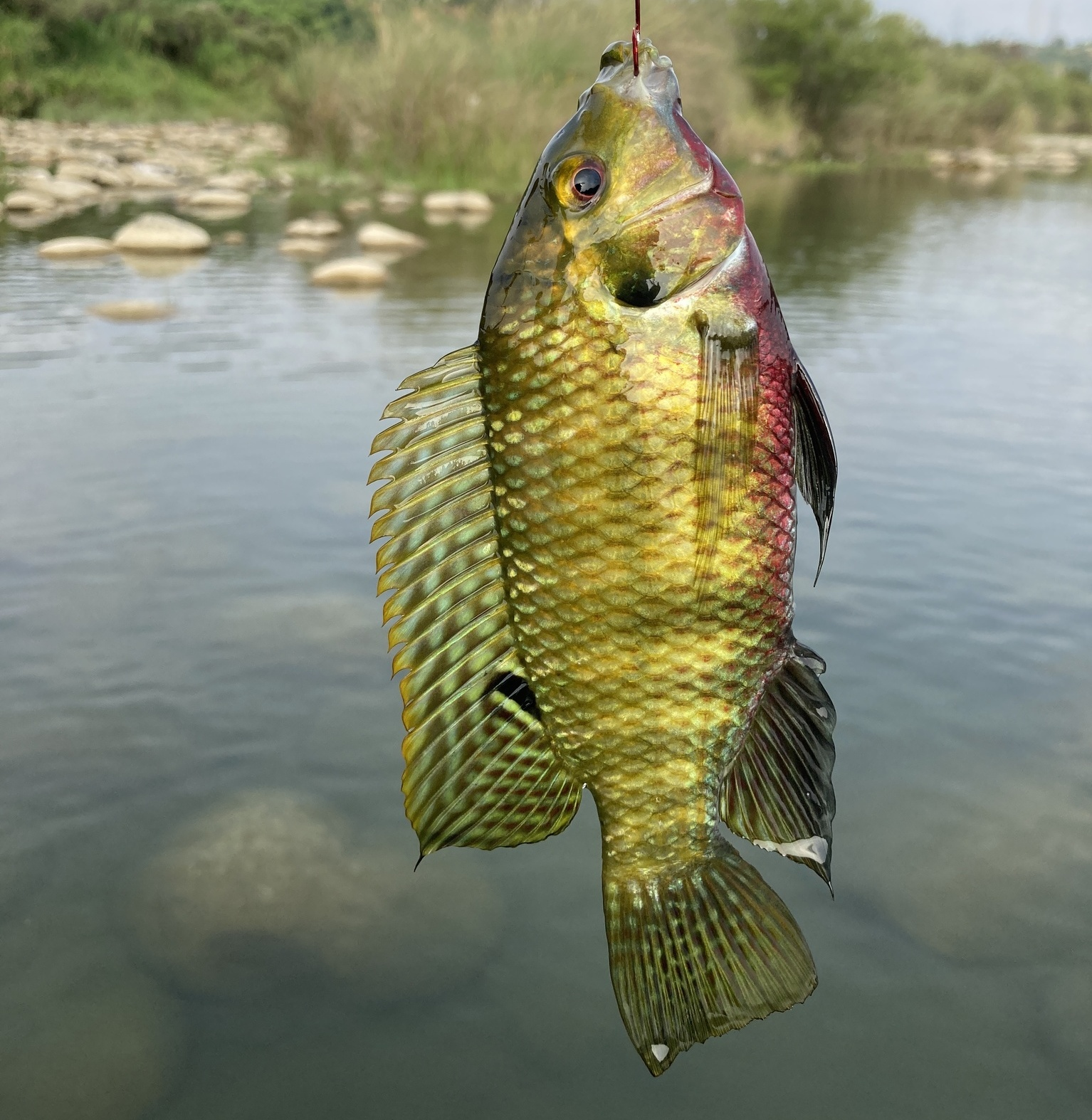
In Taiwan

The redbelly tilapia has a preference for shallow waters with vegetation, but it also occurs in more open habitats like sandy shores and as deep as 30 m (100 ft).

Although primarily a species of fresh and brackish water habitats, it tolerates high salinities, up to 4% (sea water is c. 3.5%), but the upper breeding limit is at 2.9%. The redbelly tilapia also can live in a wide range of water temperatures, but in the northern part of its range it sometimes falls below its requirements (minimum 6.5–13 °C [43.7–55.4 °F], depending on a range of factors), resulting in large numbers dying. In Alabama, it was necessary to introduce them each year to maintain a population, as they die during the winter. The upper limit typically is 36 °C (97 °F), but it can survive to 42.5 °C (108.5 °F).

== Appearance ==
The redbelly tilapia can reach up to 300 g (11 oz) in weight and 40 cm (16 in) in length, but usually is no more than 30 cm (12 in). In the Middle East, adults typically are 12–22 cm (5–9 in) long. Males tend to grow larger than females, but otherwise the sexes are similar.

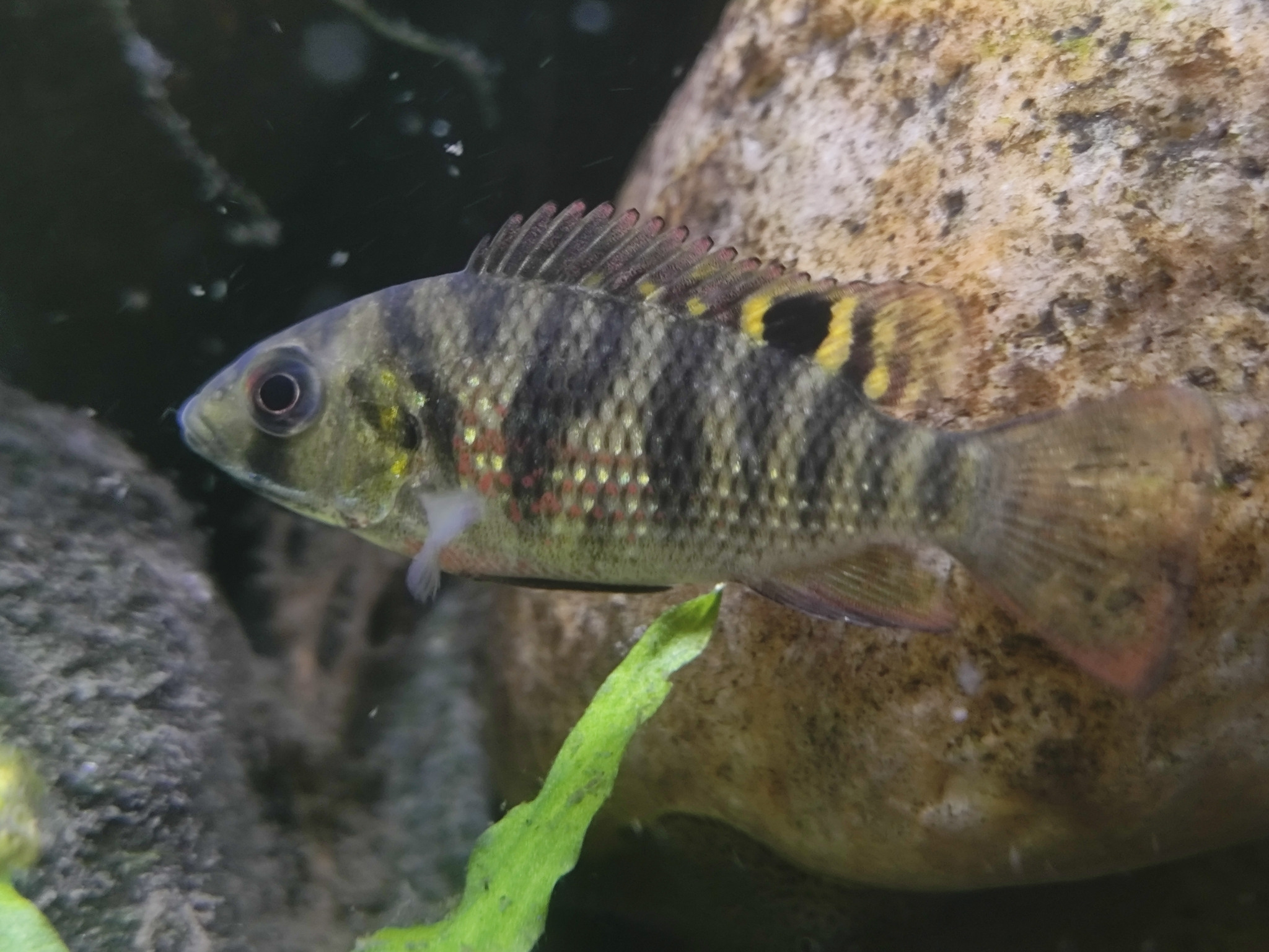
Young redbelly tilapia

Its base color is brownish-olivaceous and the belly is yellowish or whitish. It often (for example, when agitated) has a faint/poorly defined dark pattern consisting of two horizontal lines on the body crossed by about half a dozen vertical bars. Breeding adults are more greenish overall, have iridescent blue-green spots on the head and bright pinkish-red underparts. This species very closely resembles the redbreast tilapia (C. rendalli) and the two are difficult to distinguish; many reports of introduced populations may involve either species. The two have separate natural distribution (redbelly tilapia in the northern half of Africa, redbreast tilapia in the southern half), but through introductions their ranges now overlap. Whether they can hybridize is unknown. It has hybridized with the spotted tilapia (Pelmatolapia mariae), a quite distant relative.

== Behavior ==
As typical of Coptodon, the redbelly tilapia is a substrate spawner and brooder. The "nest" typically is a small depression in the bottom that is dug by both parents, but sometimes the eggs are placed on the top of a stone or the "nest" is an up to 85-centimetre-deep (2 ft 9 in) tunnel that is dug into muddy substrate. Several pairs may breed quite closely together forming a colony. Each female lays 1,000–6,000 eggs per spawning and she may spawn multiple times in a season. Both parents guard the eggs and fry. In tropical locations it breeds year-round, although peaking in the rainy season. In colder subtropical regions like Israel it only breeds in the summer, at water temperatures of at least 20 °C (68 °F). All other cichlids native to Western Asia are mouthbrooders.

The redbelly tilapia mostly feeds on algae and higher plants (both aquatic plants and land plants that become accessible to the fish), but it also takes smaller quantities of invertebrates and fish eggs. Young redbelly tilapias feed extensively on tiny crustaceans.
