= Oreochromis urolepis hornorum =

Wami tilapia

Conservation status
- Least Concern (IUCN 3.1)

Scientific classification
- Kingdom: Animalia
- Phylum: Chordata
- Class: Actinopterygii
- Order: Cichliformes
- Family: Cichlidae
- Genus: Oreochromis
- Species: O. urolepis
- Subspecies: O. u. hornorum

Trinomial name
- Oreochromis urolepis hornorum (Trewavas, 1966)

Synonyms
- Tilapia hornorum Trewavas, 1966; Oreochromis hornorum (Trewavas, 1966); Sarotherodon hornorum (Trewavas, 1966)

Subspecies of fish

The Wami tilapia is a tilapiine cichlid that grows to over 20 cm in length and is considered a useful food fish in Tanzania and the island of Zanzibar, which is recognized as a potential origin. It is tolerant of brackish water and grows well in saline pools, making it particularly suitable for aquaculture by communities living close to the sea. Like other tilapia, it is an omnivore and will feed on algae, plants, small invertebrates, and detritus. The common name refers to the Wami River.

Formerly considered a separate species, it is at present merged with the Rufigi tilapia and thus the scientific name is Oreochromis urolepis hornorum. The obsolete scientific name Tilapia hornorum is also still seen not infrequently. However, mtDNA sequence analysis has found that the mitochondrial genome is possibly very similar to that of Sarotherodon galilaeus (Nagl et al. 2001); it might be moved to Sarotherodon based on these results. On the other hand, hybridization is quite common in tilapiines and hybrids even between not too closely related species may be fertile.

In captivity, Wami tilapia have been hybridised with the Mozambique tilapia (Oreochromis mossambicus). The resulting fish produce broods almost entirely consisting of males. Male tilapia grow faster and to a more uniform size than females, making them particularly useful for aquaculture. Note that based on the mtDNA study by Nagl et al. (2001), the Mozambique and Wami tilapias do not appear to be closely related.

3 possibilities may explain this discrepancy: Either, the Wami tilapia and its closest relatives (such as the Rufigi and Blue Tilapias) belong into Sarotherodon. Alternatively, they are correctly placed in Oreochromis but their ancestors hybridized with some ancestral Sarotherodon. Given that only a single specimen was analyzed, it is theoretically also possible that the Wami tilapia is a cryptic species complex. This is less likely because cryptic speciation requires barriers to gene flow which in the tilapiines are not well-developed.

The mtDNA data of Klett & Meyer (2002) places the Rufigi tilapia into Oreochromis (though not close to the Mozambique Tilapia, but rather to Oreochromis amphimelas). This would seem to support the second hypothesis - maternal gene flow from Sarotherodon to Oreochromis; whether this is correct or not, it amply illustrates that mtDNA sequences are not a reliable indicator of phylogenetic relationships in these fish.
