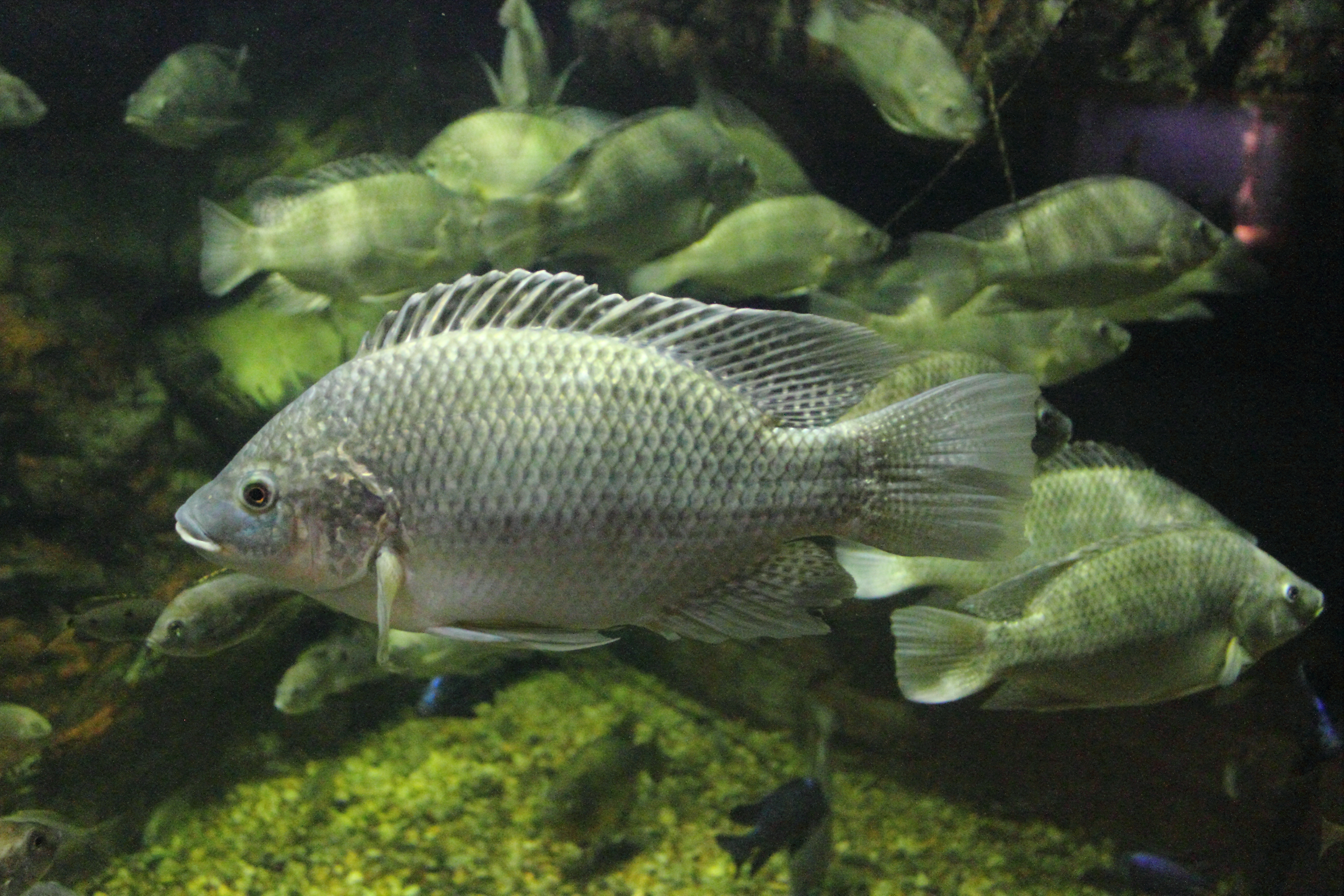

Conservation status
- Vulnerable (IUCN 3.1)

Scientific classification
- Kingdom: Animalia
- Phylum: Chordata
- Class: Actinopterygii
- Order: Cichliformes
- Family: Cichlidae
- Genus: Oreochromis
- Species: O. mossambicus

Binomial name
- Oreochromis mossambicus (W. K. H. Peters, 1852)

Synonyms
- Synonyms list: Chromis mossambicus W. K. H. Peters, 1852; Chromis niloticus var. mossambicus W. K. H. Peters, 1852; Sarotherodon mossambicus (W. K. H. Peters, 1852); Tilapia mossambica (W. K. H. Peters, 1852); Tilapia mossambica mossambica (W. K. H. Peters, 1852); Tilapia mossambicus (W. K. H. Peters, 1852); Chromis dumerilii Steindachner, 1864; Tilapia dumerilii (Steindachner, 1864); Chromis vorax Pfeffer, 1893; Tilapia vorax (Pfeffer, 1893); Chromis natalensis M. C. W. Weber, 1897; Sarotherodon mossambicus natalensis (M. C. W. Weber, 1897); Tilapia natalensis (M. C. W. Weber, 1897); Tilapia arnoldi Gilchrist & W. W. Thompson, 1917; Oreochromis mossambicus bassamkhalafi Khalaf, 2009

= Mozambique tilapia =

Species of fish

The Mozambique tilapia (Oreochromis mossambicus) is an oreochromine cichlid fish native to southeastern Africa. Dull colored, the Mozambique tilapia often lives up to a decade in its native habitats. It is a popular fish for aquaculture. Due to human introductions, it is now found in many tropical and subtropical habitats around the globe, where it can become an invasive species because of its robust nature. These same features make it a good species for aquaculture because it readily adapts to new situations.

== Common names ==
The species is known by a number of common names in places where they were introduced, including:

- Blue kurper in South Africa.
- Mujair in Indonesia, the name derived from a Javanese breeder Moedjair.
- Daya in Pakistan
- Jesus fish in the Elim area of Jamaica, named for their habit of multiplying
- Tilapia negra (lit. black tilapia) in Colombia

== Description ==
The native, wild-type Mozambique tilapia is laterally compressed, being deep bodied. It has long dorsal fins, the front part of which have spines. Native coloration is a dull greenish or yellowish, and weak banding may be seen. Adults reach up to 39 cm (15 in) in standard length and up to 1.1 kg (2.4 lb). It lives up to 11 years.

Size and coloration may vary in captive and naturalized populations due to environmental and breeding pressures.

=== Hybridization ===
As with most species of tilapia, Mozambique tilapia have a high potential for hybridization. They are often crossbred with other tilapia species in aquaculture because purebred Mozambique tilapia don't grow as quickly and have a body shape poorly suited to cutting large fillets; these hybrids may or may not be reported as hybrid fish, often being listed as the wild species, Oreochromis mossambicus. Mozambique tilapia are hybridized because they naturally tolerate saltwater, a desirable trait in aquaculture, and the resultant offspring may inherit this trait. Also, hybrids between certain parent combinations (such as between Mozambique and Wami tilapia) result in offspring that are predominantly or entirely male. Male tilapia are preferred in aquaculture as they grow faster and have a more uniform adult size than females. The "Florida Red" tilapia is a popular commercial hybrid of Mozambique and blue tilapia.

== Distribution and habitat ==
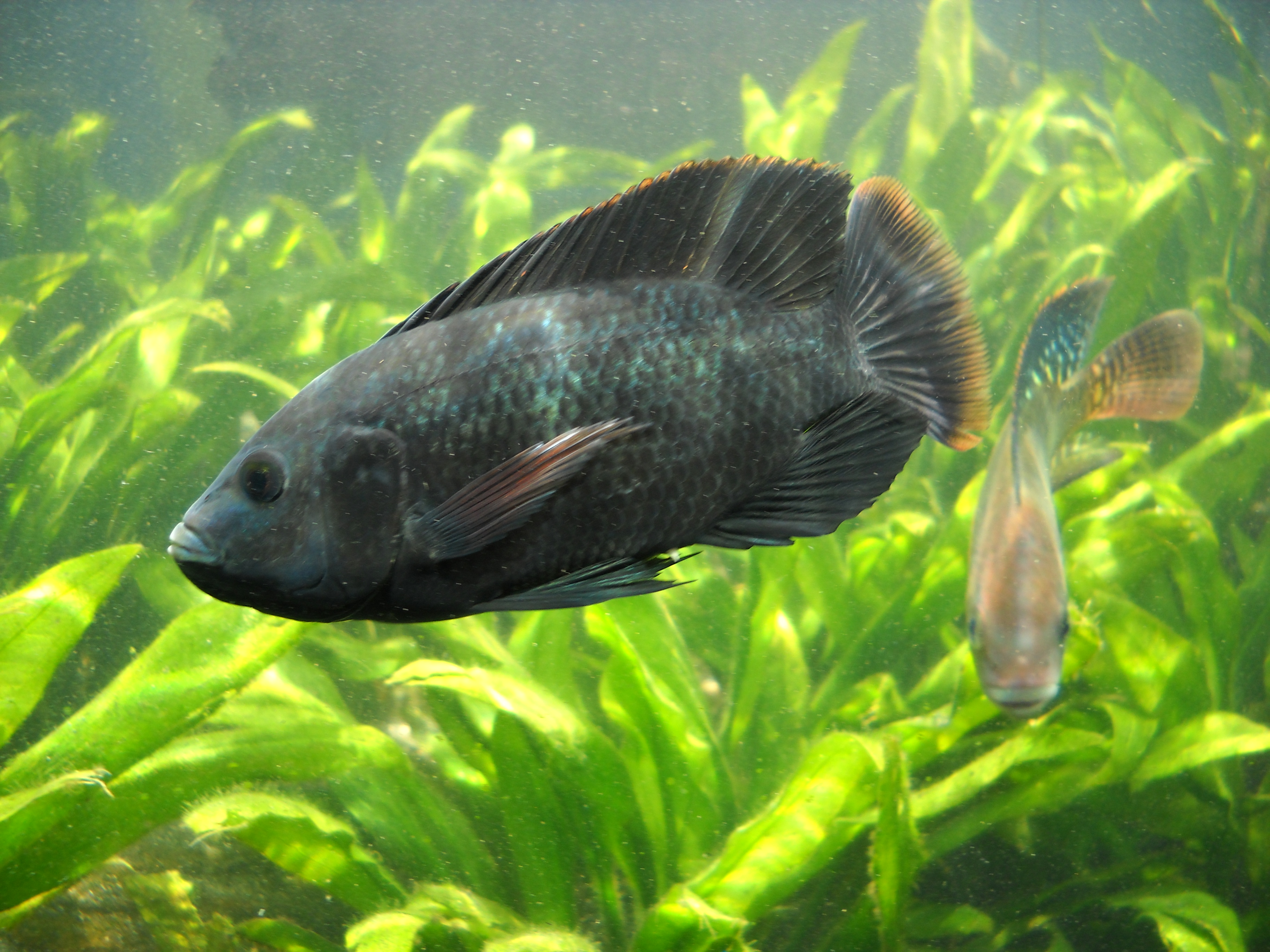
An adult male in breeding condition

The Mozambique tilapia is native to inland and coastal waters in southeastern Africa, from the Zambezi basin in Mozambique, Malawi, Zambia and Zimbabwe to Bushman River in South Africa's Eastern Cape province. It is threatened in its home range by the introduced Nile tilapia. In addition to competing for the same resources, the two readily hybridize. This has already been documented from the Zambezi and Limpopo Rivers, and it is expected that pure Mozambique tilapia eventually will disappear from both.

Otherwise it is a remarkably robust and fecund fish, readily adapting to available food sources and breeding under suboptimal conditions. Among others, it occurs in rivers, streams, canals, ponds, lakes, swamps and estuaries, although it typically avoids fast-flowing waters, waters at high altitudes and the open sea. It inhabits waters that range from 17 to 35 °C (63–95 °F).

=== Invasiveness ===
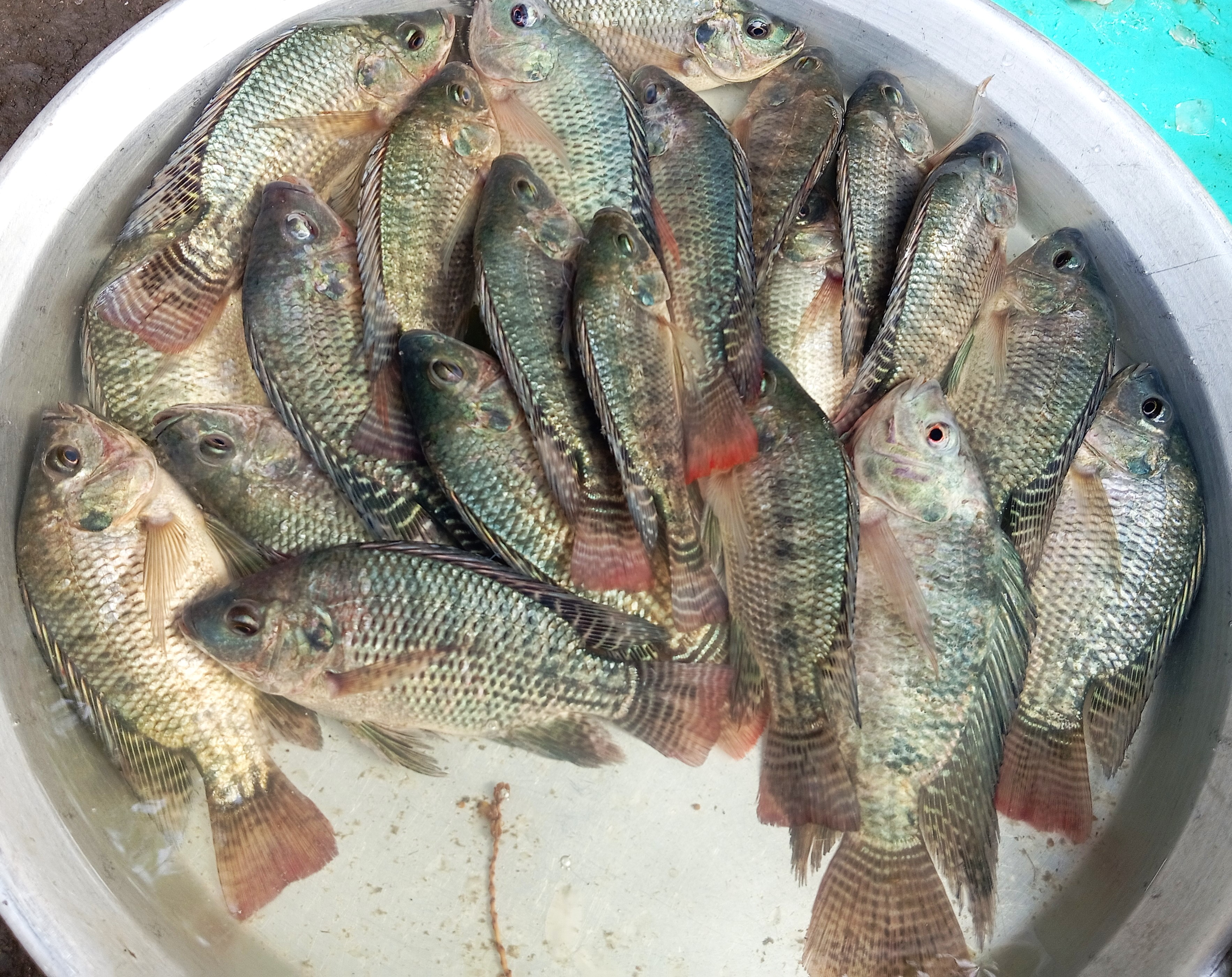
Mozambique tilapia from West Bengal, India.

The Mozambique tilapia or hybrids involving this species and other tilapia are invasive in many parts of the world outside their native range, having escaped from aquaculture or deliberately introduced to control mosquitoes. The Mozambique tilapia is listed by the Invasive Species Specialist Group as one of the top 100 worst invasive species in the world. It can harm native fish populations through competition for food and nesting space, as well as by directly consuming small fish. In Hawaii, striped mullet Mugil cephalus are threatened because of the introduction of this species. The population of hybrid Mozambique tilapia x Wami tilapia in California's Salton Sea may also be responsible for the decline of the desert pupfish, Cyprinodon macularius.

== Behavior ==
=== Feeding ===
Mozambique tilapia are omnivorous. They can consume detritus, diatoms, phytoplankton, invertebrates, small fry and vegetation ranging from macroalgae to rooted plants. This broad diet helps the species thrive in diverse locations.

Due to their robust nature, Mozambique tilapias often over-colonize the habitat around them, eventually becoming the most abundant species in a particular area. When over-crowding happens and resources get scarce, adults will sometimes cannibalize the young for more nutrients. Mozambique tilapia, like other fish such as Nile tilapia and trout, are opportunistic omnivores and will feed on algae, plant matter, organic particles, small invertebrates and other fish. Feeding patterns vary depending on which food source is the most abundant and the most accessible at the time. In captivity, Mozambique tilapias have been known to learn how to feed themselves using demand feeders. During commercial feeding, the fish may energetically jump out of the water for food.

=== Social structure ===
Mozambique tilapias often travel in groups where a strict dominance hierarchy is maintained. Positions within the hierarchy correlate with territoriality, courtship rate, nest size, aggression, and hormone production. In terms of social structure, Mozambique tilapias engage in a system known as lek-breeding, where males establish territories with dominance hierarchies while females travel between them. Social hierarchies typically develop because of competition for limited resources including food, territories, or mates. During the breeding season, males cluster around certain territory, forming a dense aggregation in shallow water. This aggregation forms the basis of the lek through which the females preferentially choose their mates. Reproductive success by males within the lek is highly correlated to social status and dominance.

In experiments with captive tilapias, evidence demonstrates the formation of linear hierarchies where higher-ranked males participate in significantly more agonistic interactions. Mozambique tilapias display more agonistic interactions towards fish that are farther apart in the hierarchy scale than they do towards individuals closer in rank. One hypothesis behind this action rests with the fact that aggressive actions are costly. In this context, members of this social system tend to avoid confrontations with neighboring ranks in order to conserve resources rather than engage in an unclear and risky fight. Instead, dominant individuals seek to bully subordinate tilapias both for an easy fight and to keep their rank.

=== Communication and aggression ===
The urine of Mozambique tilapias, like many freshwater fish species, acts as a vector for communication amongst individuals. Hormones and pheromones released with urine by the fish often affect the behavior and physiology of the opposite sex. Dominant males signal females through the use of a urinary odorant. Further studies have suggested that females respond to the ratio of chemicals within the urine, as opposed to the odor itself. Nevertheless, females are known to be able to distinguish between hierarchical rank and dominant vs. subordinate males through chemicals in urine.

Urinary pheromones also play a part in male – male interaction for Mozambique tilapias. Studies have shown that male aggression is highly correlated with increased urination. Symmetrical aggression between males resulted in an increase in the release of urination frequency. Dominant males both store and release more potent urine during agonistic interactions. Thus, both the initial stage of lek formation and the maintenance of social hierarchy may highly depend on the males' varying urinary output.

Aggression amongst males usually involve a typical sequence of visual, acoustic, and tactile signals that eventually escalates to physical confrontation if no resolution is reached. Usually, conflict ends before physical aggression as fights are both costly and risky. Bodily damage may impede an individual's ability to find a mate in the future. In order to prevent cheating, in which individual may fake his own fitness, these aggressive rituals incur significant energetic costs. Thus, cheating is prevented by the sheer fact that the costs of initiating a ritual often outweigh the benefits of cheating. In this regard, differences between individuals in endurance plays a critical role in resolving the winner and the loser.

=== Reproduction ===
In the first step in the reproductive cycle for Mozambique tilapia, males excavate a nest into which a female can lay her eggs. After the eggs are laid, the male fertilizes them. Then the female stores the eggs in her mouth until the fry hatch; this act is called mouthbrooding. One of the main reasons behind the aggressive actions of Mozambique tilapias is access to reproductive mates. The designation of Mozambique tilapias as an invasive species rests on their life-history traits: Tilapias exhibit high levels of parental care as well as the capacity to spawn multiple broods through an extended reproductive season, both contributing to their success in varying environments. In the lek system, males congregate and display themselves to attract females for matings. Thus, mating success is highly skewed towards dominant males, who tend to be larger, more aggressive, and more effective at defending territories. Dominant males also build larger nests for the spawn. During courtship rituals, acoustic communication is widely used by the males to attract females. Studies have shown that females are attracted to dominant males who produce lower peak frequencies as well as higher pulse rates. At the end of mating, males guard the nest while females take both the eggs and the sperm into their mouth. Due to this, Mozambique tilapias can occupy many niches during spawning since the young can be transported in the mouth. These proficient reproductive strategies may be the cause behind their invasive tendencies.

Male Mozambique tilapias synchronize breeding behavior in terms of courtship activity and territoriality in order to take advantage of female spawning synchrony. One of the costs associated with this synchronization is the increase in competition among males, which are already high on the dominance hierarchy. As a result, different mating tactics have evolved in these species. Males may mimic females and sneak reproduction attempts when the dominant male is occupied. Likewise, another strategy for males is to exist as a floater, travelling between territories in an attempt to find a mate. Nevertheless, it is the dominant males who have the greatest reproductive advantage.

=== Parental care ===
Typically, Mozambique tilapias, like all species belonging to the genus Oreochromis and species like Astatotilapia burtoni, are maternal mouthbrooders, meaning that spawn is incubated and raised in the mouth of the mother. Parental care is, therefore, almost exclusive to the female. Males do contribute by providing nests for the spawn before incubation, but the energy costs associated with nest production is low relative to mouthbrooding. Compared to nonmouthbrooders, both mouthbrooding and growing a new clutch of eggs is not energetically feasible. Thus, Mozambique tilapias arrest oocyte growth during mouthbrooding to conserve energy. Even with oocyte arrest, females that mouthbrood take significant costs in body weight, energy, and low fitness. Hence, parental-offspring conflict is visible through the costs and benefits to the parents and the young. A mother caring for her offspring carries the cost of reducing her own individual fitness. Unlike most fish, Mozambique tilapias exhibit an extended maternal care period believed to allow social bonds to be formed.

== Use in aquaculture ==
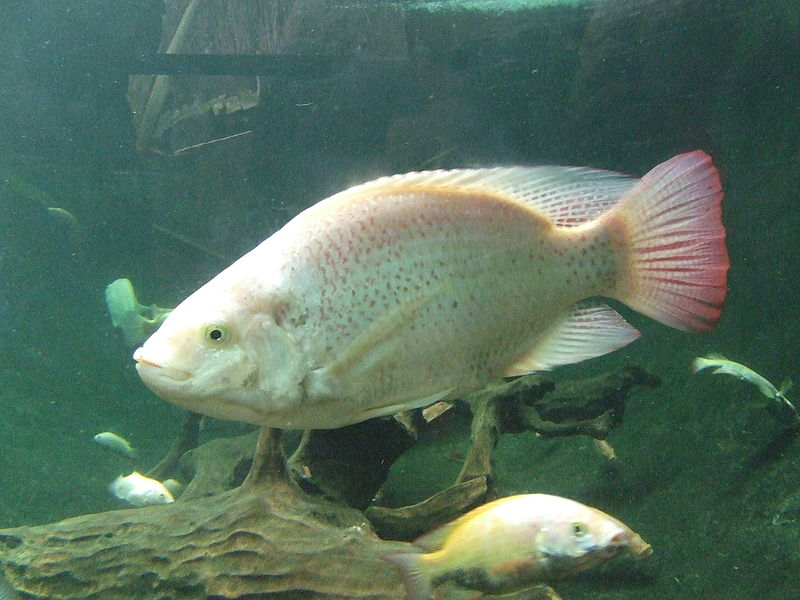
An albino strain has been developed in captivity

Capture (blue) and aquaculture (green) production of Mozambique tilapia (Oreochromis mossambicus) in thousand tonnes from 1950 to 2022, as reported by the FAO

Mozambique tilapia are hardy, being easy to raise and harvest, making them a good aquacultural species. They have a mild, white flesh that is appealing to consumers. This species constitutes about 4% of the total tilapia aquaculture production worldwide, but is more commonly hybridized with other tilapia species. Tilapia are very susceptible to diseases such as whirling disease and ich. Mozambique tilapia are resistant to wide varieties of water quality issues and pollution levels. Because of these abilities they have been used as bioassay organisms to generate metal toxicity data for risk assessments of local freshwater species in South Africa rivers.

Mozambique tilapia were one of the species flown on the Bion-M No.1 spacecraft in 2013, but they all died due to equipment failure.
