= Moedjair =

Javanese inventor

Moedjair or Mujair (1890–1957) was a Javanese inventor who in 1939 was the first to culture the fish species Tilapia zillii, at the mouth of the Serang River, in the northern reaches of Java Island.

Moedjair (1890-1957)

Moedjair was born Iwan Dalauk in 1890 in Blitar, East Java; he died there in 1957.

== Experimentation with fish ==
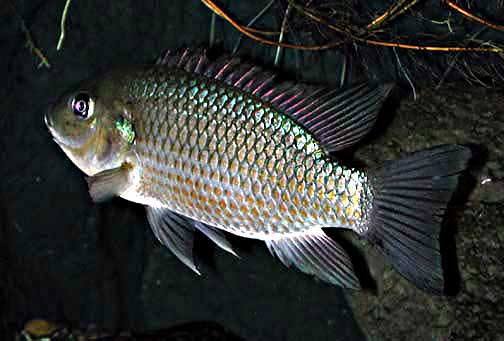
Oreochromis mossambicus or "Java tilapia" first cultivated at freshwater in Java island by Moedjair.

In 1939, Mudjair went looking for fish at the river estuary along coast. He noticed a strange fish that fed its children when in danger and spit back when they reached safety. Wishing to bring a specimen home, Moedjair questioned whether the fish would survive a non-saltwater environment. Experimenting with freshwater habitats, he demonstrated 4 fish can live in saltwater after 11 experiments. These 4 fish, released in rivers and lakes, quickly grew in population. To honor his work, the fish was named mujair in Indonesian, and mujair is now a popular freshwater fish in Indonesia.
