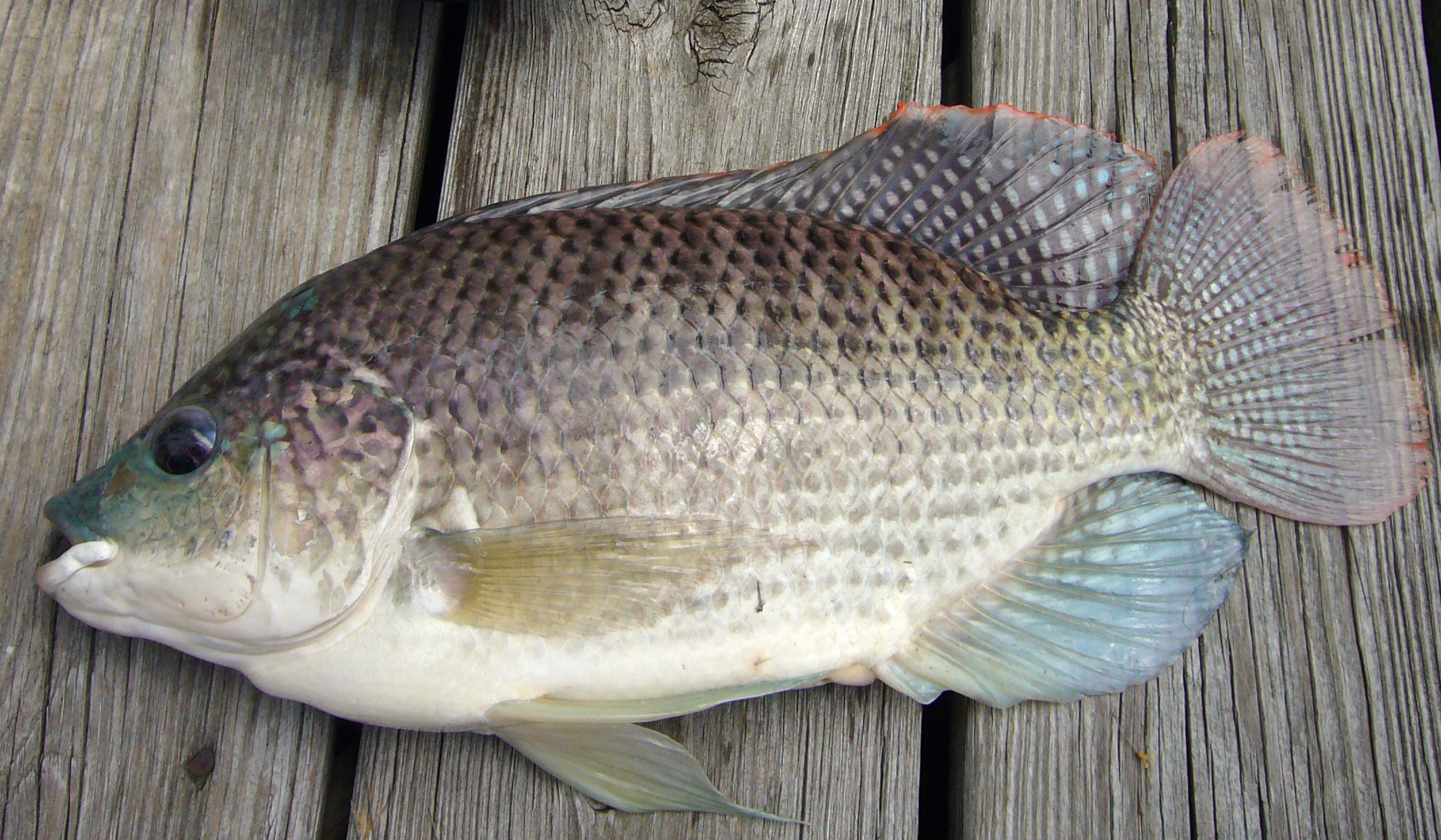

Conservation status
- Least Concern (IUCN 3.1) (Pan-Africa)

Scientific classification
- Kingdom: Animalia
- Phylum: Chordata
- Class: Actinopterygii
- Division: Teleostei
- Order: Cichliformes
- Family: Cichlidae
- Genus: Oreochromis
- Species: O. aureus

Binomial name
- Oreochromis aureus (Steindachner, 1864)

Synonyms
- Chromis aureus Steindachner, 1864; Sarotherodon aureus (Steindachner, 1864); Tilapia aurea (Steindachner, 1864 ); Tilapia nilotica exul Steinitz, 1951; Tilapia aurea exul Steinitz, 1951; Tilapia monodi Daget, 1954; Tilapia lemassoni Blache & Miton, 1960; Tilapia kashabi Elster, 1958 (ambiguous); Tilapia kacherbi Wunder, 1960 (ambiguous)

= Oreochromis aureus =

Species of fish

The blue tilapia (Oreochromis aureus) is a species of tilapia, a fish in the family Cichlidae. Native to Northern and Western Africa, and the Middle East, through introductions it is now also established elsewhere, including parts of the United States, where it has been declared an invasive species and has caused significant environmental damage. It is known as the blue kurper in South Africa.

== Description ==
In their introduced US range, blue tilapia are usually 120 to 200 millimetres (4 3/4 to 7 3/4 in) in length, and reach weights up to 5 to 6 lb (2.3 to 2.7 kg). The largest recorded specimen was more than 21 in (53 cm) long and weighed more than 10 lb (4.5 kg). Blue tilapia are mouthbrooders, and broods range from 160 to 1600 eggs per female. O. aureus is primarily herbivorous, but occasionally consumes zooplankton; the young include small invertebrates in their diet.

== Range and habitat ==
The blue tilapia is native to Northern and Western Africa, and the Middle East. In Africa, it is native to the Senegal, Niger, Benue and lower Nile Rivers. In the Middle East, it is native to the Jordan River. Through introductions, the fish can be found in the United States in Texas, Alabama, Florida, and Nevada. It has also been established in Central and South America, and Southeast Asia. The original stocks of O. aureus in the United States were from Israel.

The blue tilapia is primarily a fresh and brackish water fish that occurs in a wide range of habitats such as streams, rivers, lakes and ponds, but it has a high tolerance for salt water and even hypersaline conditions at up to 4.5% salinity (seawater is about 3.5%). It primarily occurs in waters that range from 12 to 32 °C (54–90 °F), but tolerates between 8 and 40 °C (46–104 °F).

=== Israel ===
In Israel, Oreochromis aureus is also known as Jordan St. Peter's fish and was traditionally coming down the Jordan River from Lake Huleh to the Sea of Galilee. It is black and larger than the white "Common St. Peter's fish" or simply "St. Peter's fish", the redbelly tilapia (Arabic: مشط, romanized: musht, lit. 'comb', adopted into Modern Hebrew).

Another "St. Peter's fish" is the "Galilee St. Peter's fish" (mango tilapia, Sarotherodon galileus; Arabic: مشط أبيض, romanized: musht abyaḍ), which is white and also larger than C. zillii.

== Invasive species ==
Oreochromis aureus has been introduced in many places around the world for use as a food fish, and frequently in order to control aquatic vegetation. Its presence may have in many cases been mis-documented as Oreochromis niloticus, because the two species were only recently distinguished.

=== In the United States ===
Since its introduction into Florida in 1961, the fish has increased its range and frequency of occurrence. It is now the most widespread foreign species in Florida, with established populations as far north as Lake Alice, in Gainesville. It is a major management problem for the National Park Service due to its predominance in Taylor Slough in Everglades National Park, where it has changed the fish community structure. The species is also expanding its range in Texas. It was at one time responsible for inhibition of the population of largemouth bass in Lake Trinidad (in Henderson County) until it was extirpated, and is implicated in the unionid mussel declines in two bodies of water in Texas. It is also blamed for a severe decline in native fish populations in Warm Springs Natural Area, Nevada.

=== In Russia ===
A self-sustaining population has been reliably recorded in the Volga River basin (Russia) in the area of heated water discharge from a local power plant, demonstrating its ability to survive in localized warm-water refuges.
