= Ezbet El Borg =

Ezbet El Borg عزبة البرج Izbat al-Burj
- City
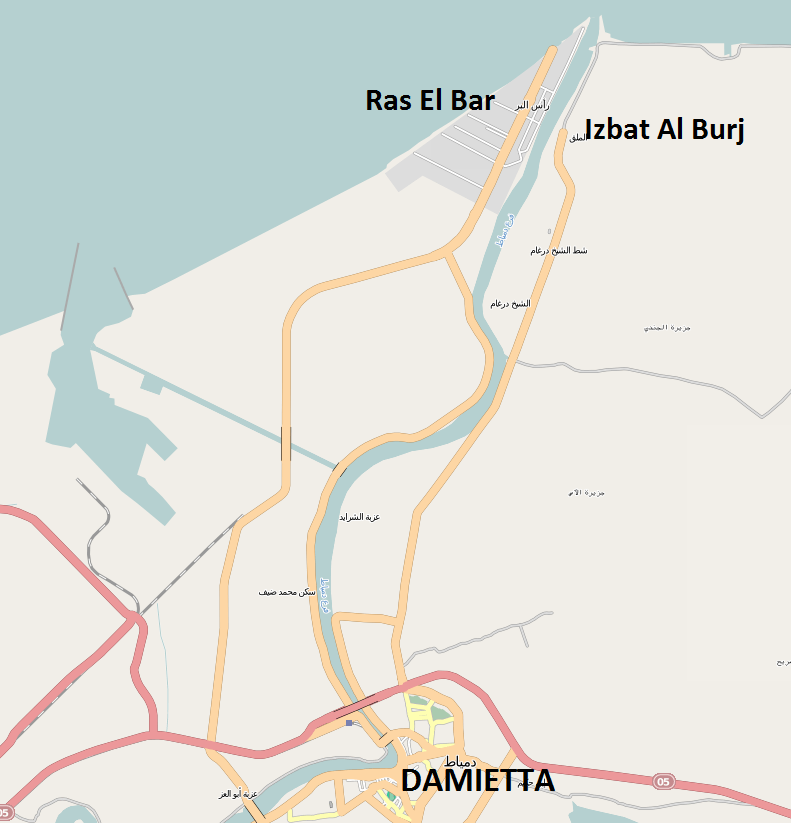
- Map showing Izbat al-Burj in relation to the city of Damietta

- Location in Egypt
- Coordinates: 31°30′11″N 31°50′28″E
- Country: Egypt
- Governorate: Damietta

Population
  - Total: 70,000
- Time zone: UTC+2 (EET)
  - Summer (DST): UTC+3 (EEST)

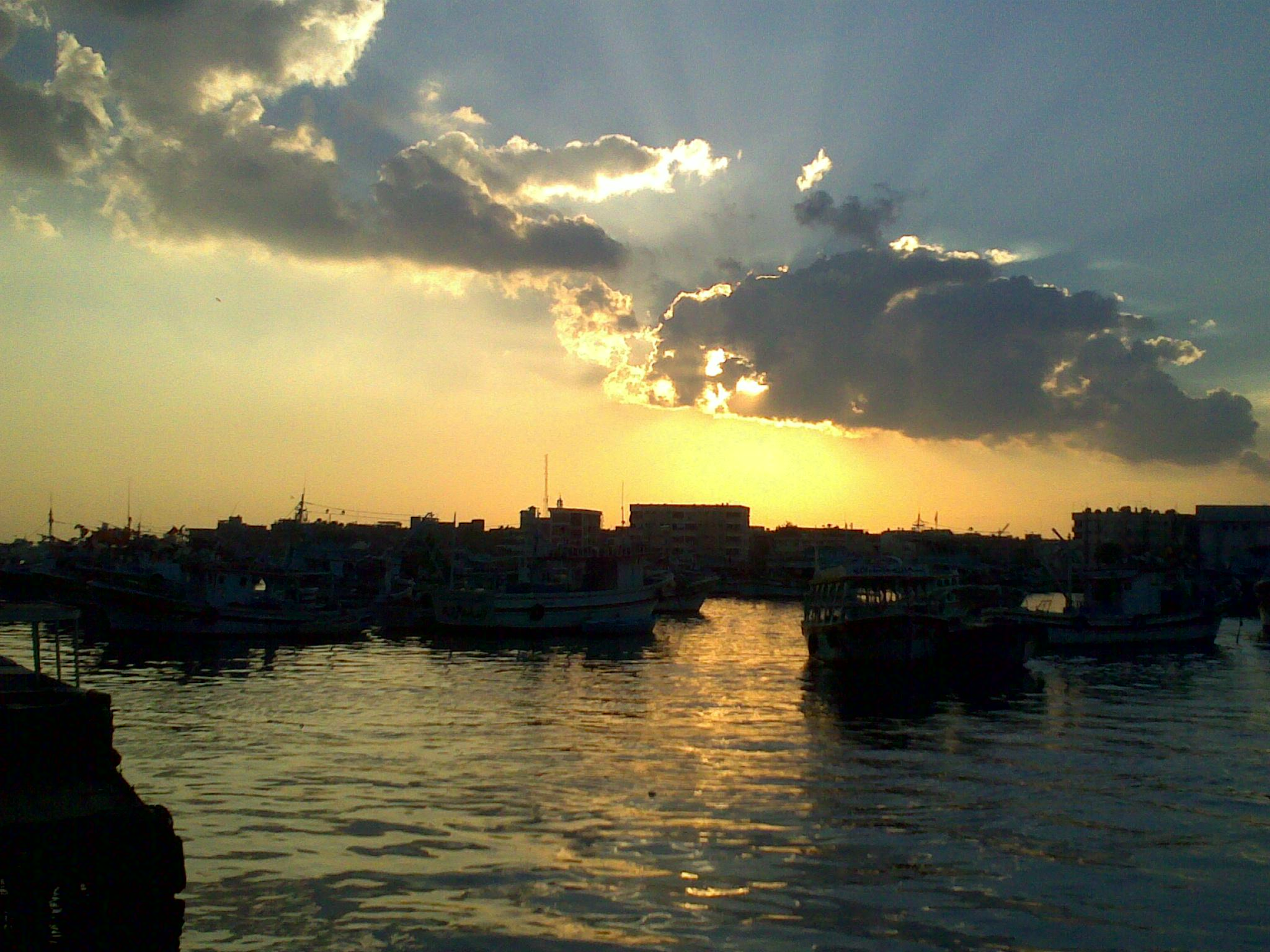
Ezbet al-Borg

Ezbet El Borg (Arabic: عزبة البرج, IPA: [ˈʕezbet elˈboɾɡ]; also transliterated ʻIzbat al-Burj, lit. Village of the Tower) is a coastal city with a large fishing industry in Damietta Governorate, Egypt. It is 15 km (9 mi) northeast of Damietta, and 210 km (130 mi) from Cairo. Its population is approximately 70,000.

The city is situated on the northern coast of Egypt at the mouth of the Damietta river, a distributary of the Nile, opposite Ras El Bar.

== History ==
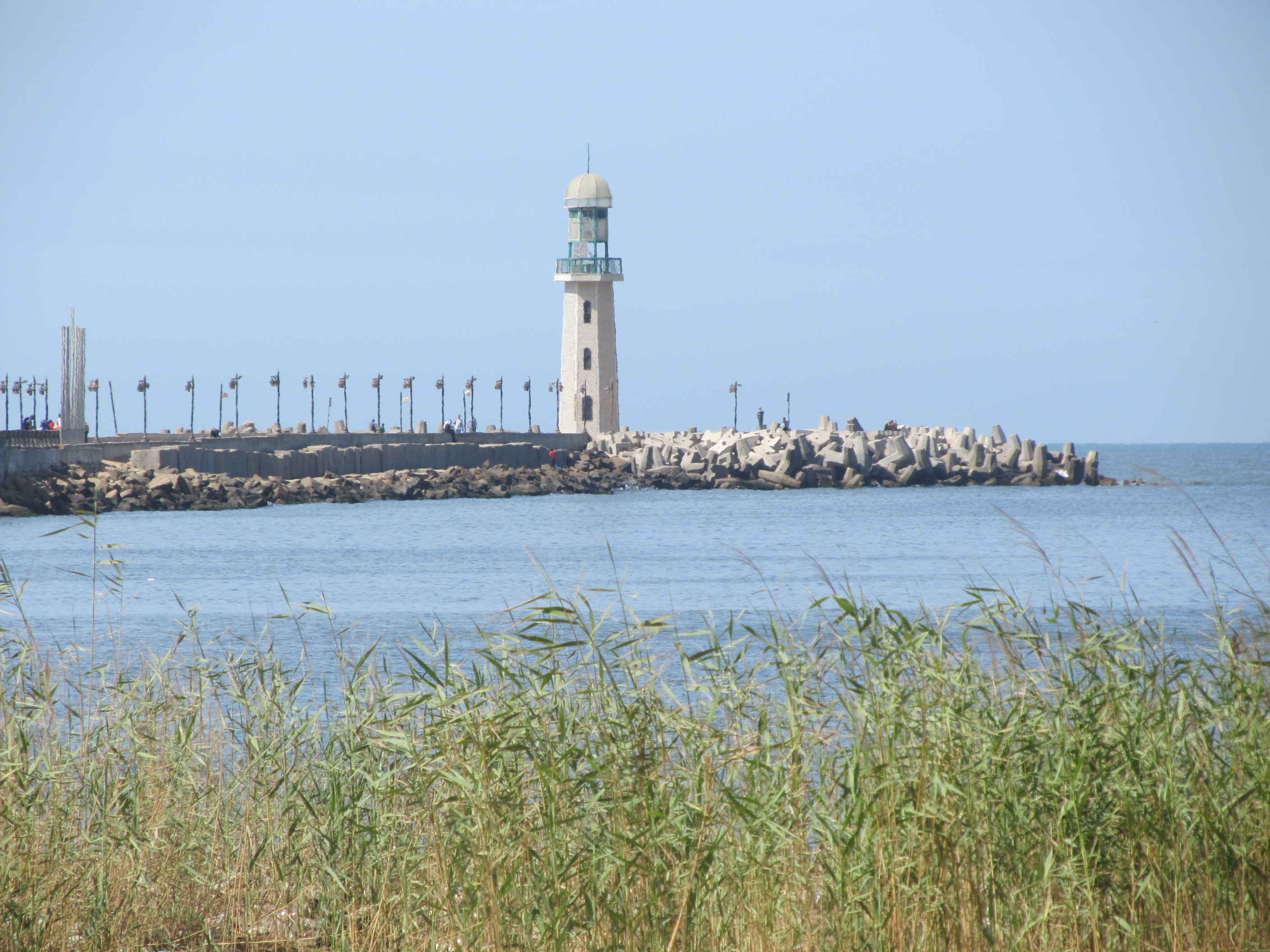
The Ras El Bar lighthouse seen from Ezbet El Borg.

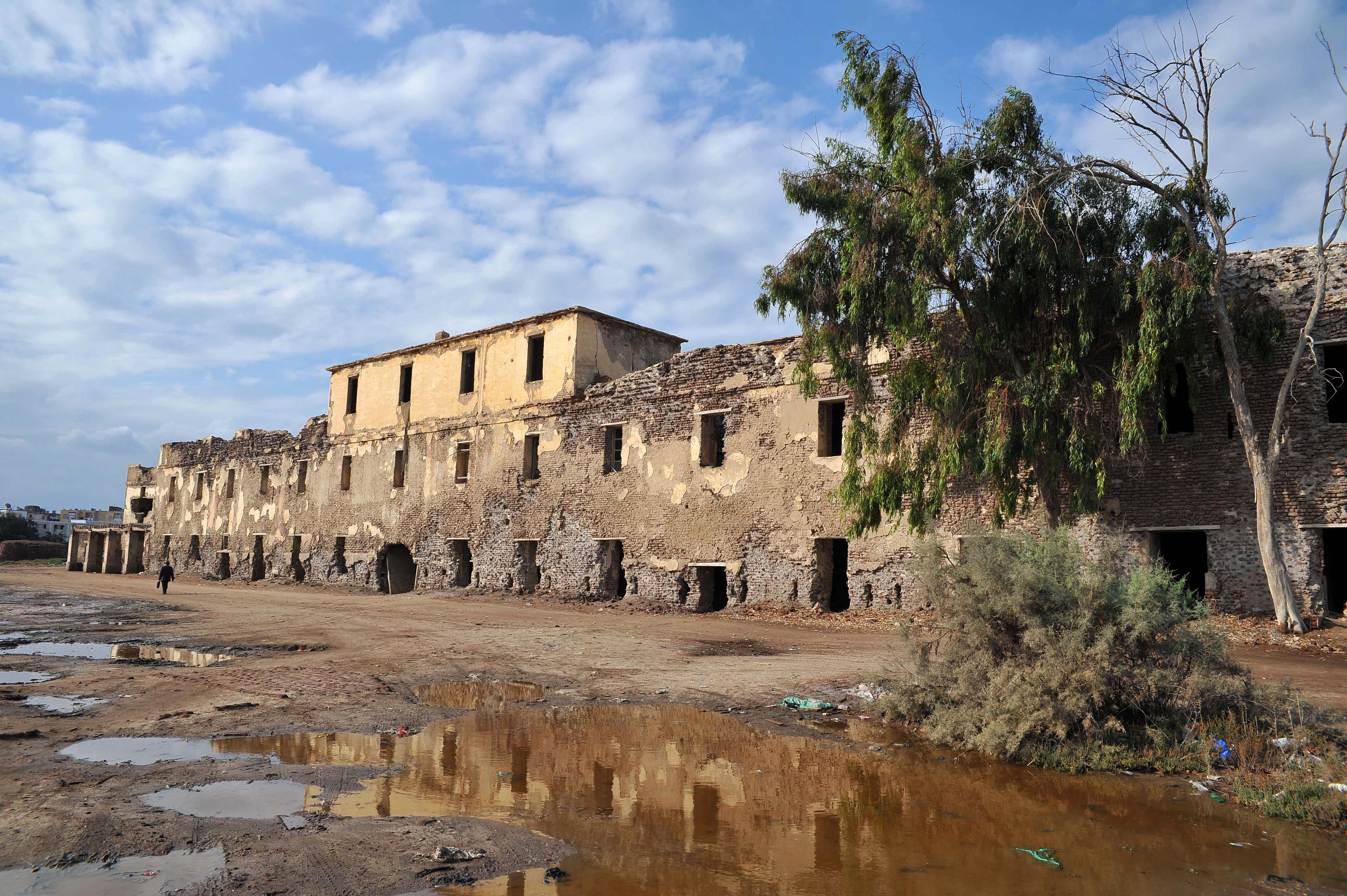
Urabi fort (Tabiet Orabi) in Ezbet al-Borg

The city was named in reference to the defensive tower that once stood there ("Burj" in Arabic means tower). In 1869, a 180-foot (55 m) minaret was built to guide ships in the Mediterranean Sea, but this location is now just a shallow spot in the Nile riverbed. The town was historically granted to the Syrian Kahil family by Muhammad Ali of Egypt.

In recent history, there were accusations of ballot stuffing at the local voting station during the 2007 Shura Council election. The August 2009 Egyptian hostage escape from Somali pirates mostly involved sailors from the town.

== Economy ==
The city is home to approximately 10,000 fishermen (1% of Egypt's total), and the base of Egypt's largest fishing boat fleet, including boats of the traditional felucca type. The city is also home to a sardine-canning factory operated by the Edfina Company. The fishing sector provides the main source of income for the locals. Many of the fishing boats venture far along the Eastern Mediterranean and the Red Sea. It is also a center for ship and yacht-building in Egypt. In 2014 and 2015, the fishermen of Ezbet El Borg were involved in a dispute with the Egyptian Authority for Maritime Safety regarding compliance with maritime safety standards.

== See also ==
- Ezbet El Nakhl
- List of cities and towns in Egypt
