= St Mungo Museum of Religious Life and Art =

Specialist museum in Glasgow, Scotland

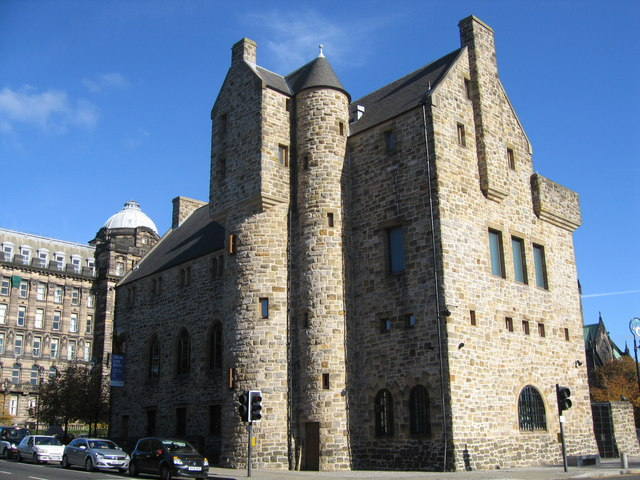
- St Mungo Museum of Religious Life and Art
- Established: 4 April 1993
- Location: 2 Castle Street, Glasgow, Scotland, United Kingdom
- Coordinates: 55.862373°N 4.236453°W
- Visitors: 231,773 (2025)
- Website: www.glasgowlife.org.uk/museums/venues/st-mungo-museum-of-religious-life-and-art

The St Mungo Museum of Religious Life and Art is a museum of religion in Glasgow, Scotland. It is the only museum dedicated to religion and art in the British Isles.

"Buddhism, Christianity, Islam, Hinduism, Sikhism and Judaism" are featured in the museum's curation. The museum's contents have been the subject of controversy and vandalism.

== History ==
=== Construction and development ===
The building that houses the St Mungo Museum of Religious Life and Art was originally commissioned by the Society of Friends of Glasgow Cathedral on land where the Bishop's Castle originally stood. It was constructed in 1989 in a "Neo-Scottish baronial" architectural style, and stained glass used in its windows were sourced from the redundant churches in the city. The building was designed by architect Ian Begg, and it is named after Saint Mungo, the patron saint of the city and the missionary who introduced Scotland to Christianity.

The Society of Friends originally envisioned that the building would be used as a visitor centre for the nearby Glasgow Cathedral, and £1 million was raised for this. In 1991, the Society realised they lacked the funds to progress with the project.

The project was passed to the Glasgow Museums and Art Galleries Department, who were inspired by the building's proximity to Glasgow Cathedral and the Necropolis to create a religion focused on religion with the purpose of promoting religious tolerance. It was also hoped that the museum would confront the city's problems of racism and religious sectarianism. Local religious communities were consulted on the curation of the museum (for example, members of the Jewish community helped to choose a painting by Dora Holzhandler to be shown), and oral histories about faith were collected to be included in the displays. Ninian Smart also consulted on the curation.

The museum was opened on 4 April 1993. On 23 June, it was ceremonially opened by Princess Anne. At its opening, it was thought that Salvador Dali's Christ of Saint John of the Cross (moved from Kelvingrove Art Gallery and Museum) would attract up to 500,000 visitors a year. In its first six months, the museum had 150,000 visitors.

=== COVID-19 and threat of closure ===
In March 2020, St Mungo Museum of Religious Life and Art closed due to the COVID-19 pandemic. During this period, the museum also struggled financially as it faced funding cuts. Threatened with permanent closure, the charity Interfaith Glasgow formed a campaign to save the museum.

On 4 March 2022, Glasgow City Council pledged new funding to the museum. It reopened to the public in September 2022.

== Collections ==
The museum holds three main galleries: The Gallery of Religious Art, the Gallery of Religious Life and the Scottish Gallery. A fourth gallery space is used for temporary exhibits. The items in the museum's collections span across five continents and more than 3000 years of history. The collections are concentrated on Scotland's most prominent religions: "Buddhism, Christianity, Islam, Hinduism, Sikhism and Judaism".

While repairs took place at the Kelvingrove Art Gallery and Museum between 1993 and 2006, the St Mungo Museum of Religious Life & Art housed the painting Christ of Saint John of the Cross by Salvador Dali. Interviews conducted by Richard Sandell found that this painting motivated many visitors to come to the museum. Christ of Saint John of the Cross was shown in the Gallery of Religious Art, sharing the space with items such as a Duein Fubara from Nigeria and an Aboriginal Australian dreamtime painting. This was an intentional juxtaposition, though the architectural design of the gallery ensured that all objects were shown with equal respect in spite of their varying sizes.

The work of Scottish artist Peter Howson has been shown frequently at the St Mungo Museum of Religious Life & Art. After Christ of Saint John of the Cross was relocated, his painting The Crucifixion (described as one of the most striking paintings of Jesus Christ completed by a Scottish artist) filled its place. In 2009, the museum hosted several pieces of his work in an exhibition about famine. In 2019, his painting The Massacre of Srebrenica was unveiled at the museum, and Homeless Jesus was also put on show. Harry Dunlop, a Glasgow Museums curator, said, "Peter's work is difficult to look at, but that is the point of having it at St Mungos. We must continue to learn from past atrocities and ensure younger generations know how to recognise the signs of intolerance and the violence it generates wherever in the world it occurs and take action against it."

The museum hosts Britain's first Zen garden. It was designed by a Zen garden expert, and it won an award from the Japanese Foundation.

=== Collections controversies and vandalism ===
Not long after the museum opened, a Christian fundamentalist attacked and a 19th century statue of Shiva Nataraja. One of the statue's arms was broken in the attack. Curator Mark O'Neill described the incident: "When asked by the member of staff who detained him why he did this he said he did it for Christ. This confirmed our conviction that a museum like St Mungo's was necessary."

The display of a photograph taken by Catherine Leroy of a clitoridectomy brought feminist protestors to picket outside of the museum. The protesters represented the magazine Harpies and Quines, and they demanded the photograph's removal. The photograph was not removed because of the connection between clitoridectomies and religious practices, although its corresponding label was revised.

The display of a photograph of a priest helping to carry the Bloody Sunday wounded also caused controversy. Critics argued that an image of "Catholic violence" should be shown to provide balance; it was argued in response that the displayed photograph was chosen because it was the most iconic image from The Troubles.

== Attendance ==
Annual visitors to St Mungo Museum of Religious Life and Art since 2008
Year	Annual visitors
2008	152,352
2009	144,366
2010	143,017
2011	112,941
2012	114,070
2013	120,976
2014	137,816
2015	143,967
2016	140,125
2017	156,509
2018	112,941
2019	159,157
2020	16,835
2021	-(complete closure)
2022	27,095
2023	148,412
2024	186,963
2025	231,773
Figures sourced from the Association of Leading Visitor Attractions

== Gallery ==
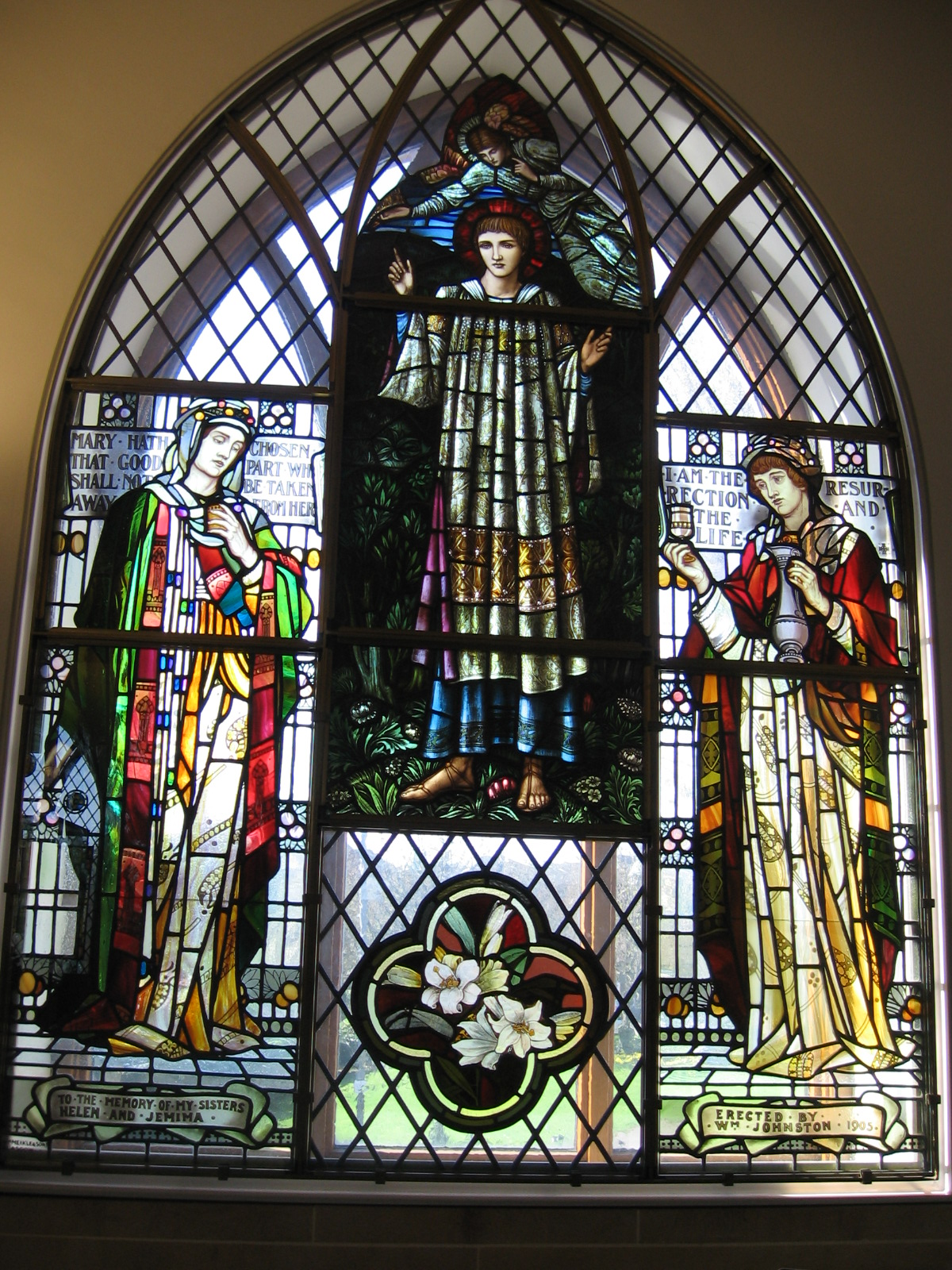
Stained glass

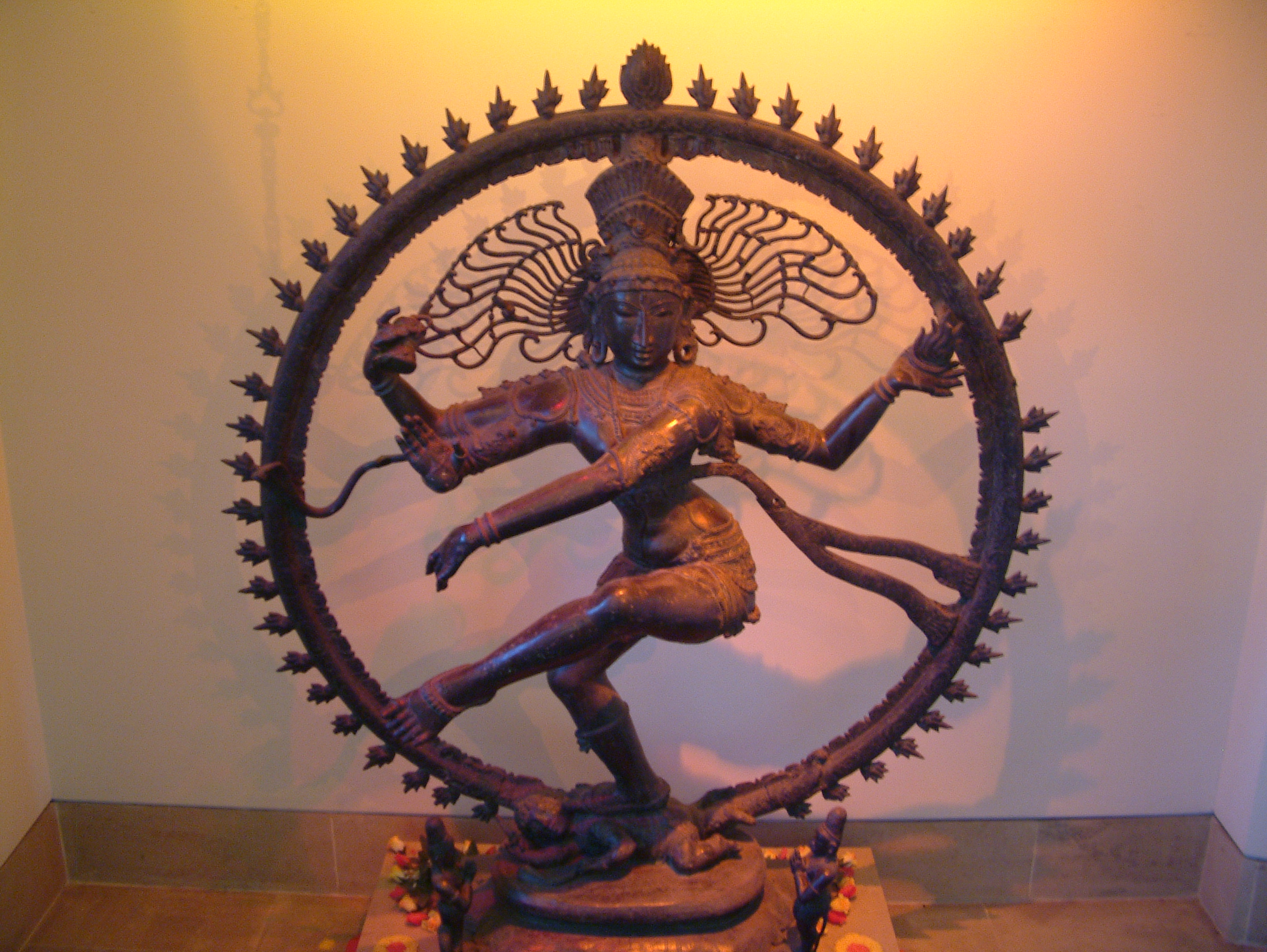
Sculpture of Shiva

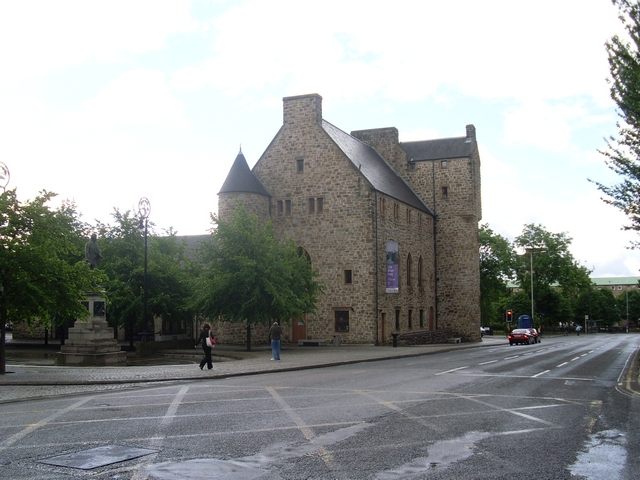
The museum from Cathedral Square

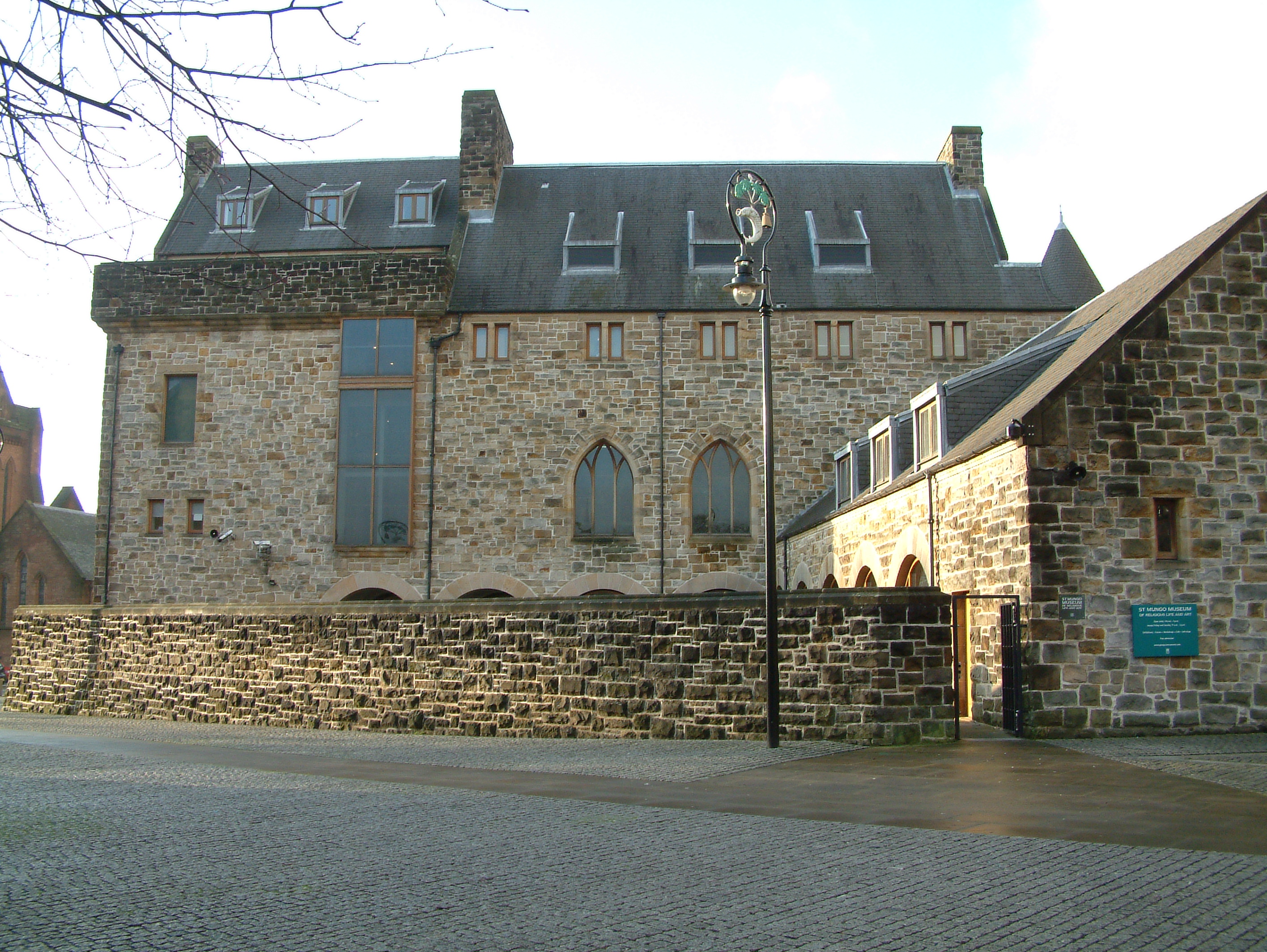
The rear of the museum

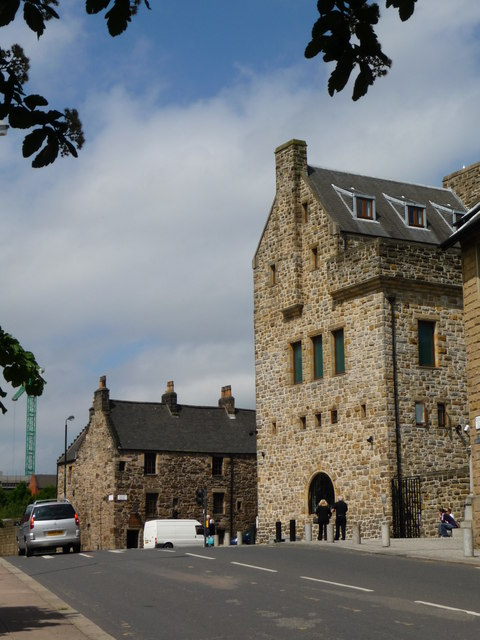
The museum and Provand's Lordship

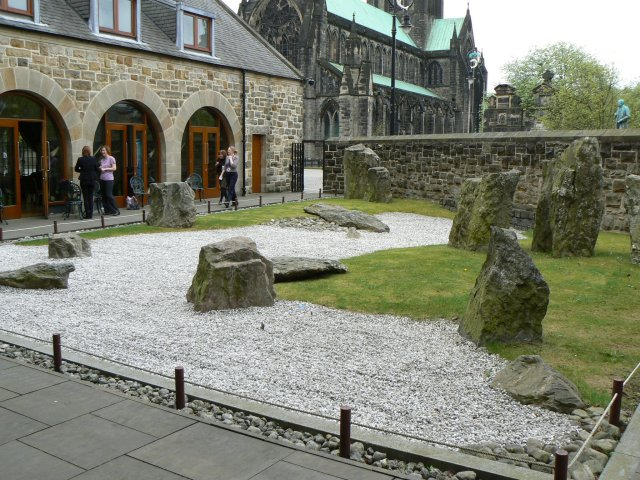
The Zen garden
