= Kalabari tribe =

Sub-group of the Ijaw people living in the eastern Niger Delta region of Nigeria

Kalabari
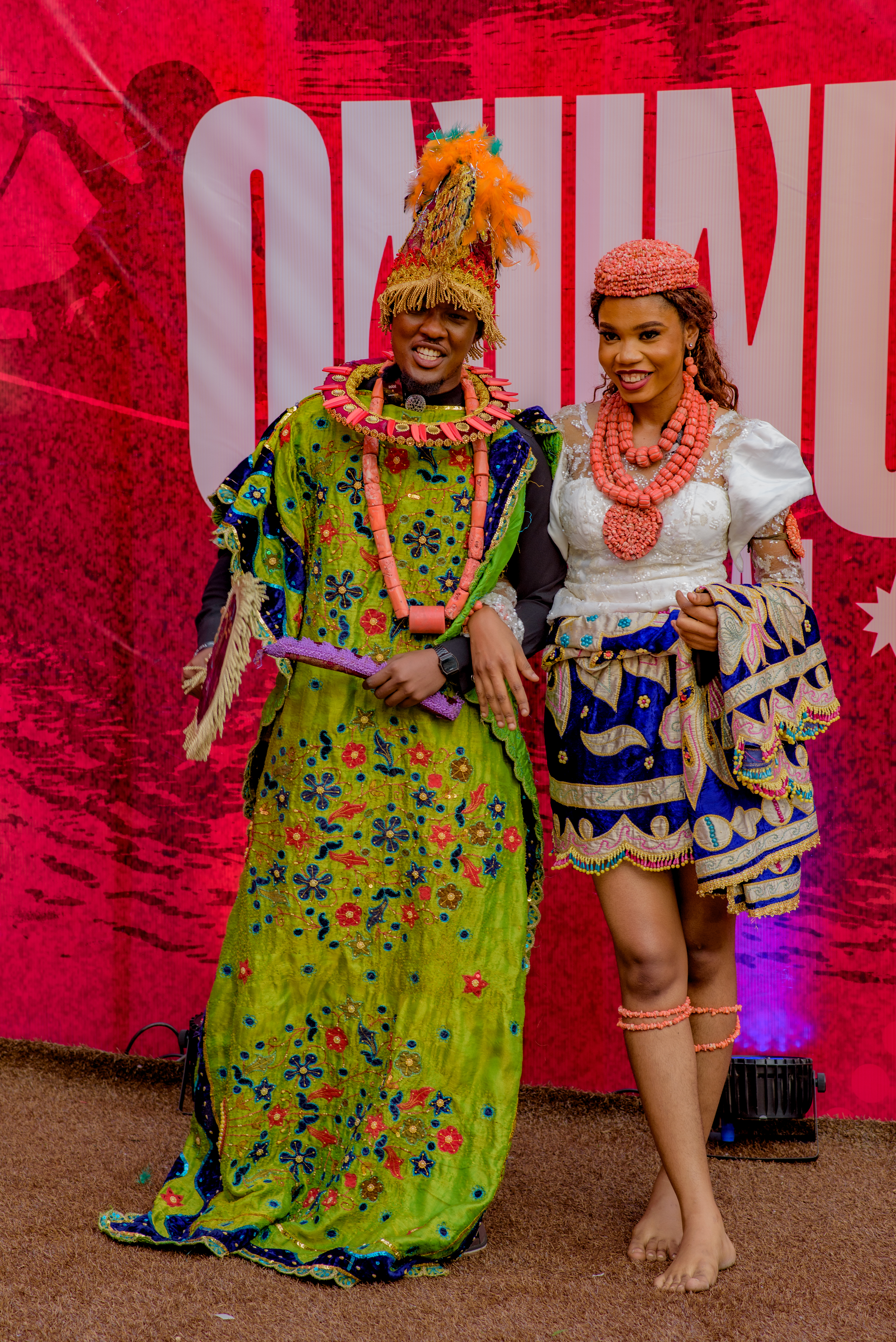
- A Kalabari couple in native attire

Total population
- 448,000

Regions with significant populations
- Rivers, Nigeria; Ghana

Languages
- Kalabari language

Related ethnic groups
- Ijaw, Bille

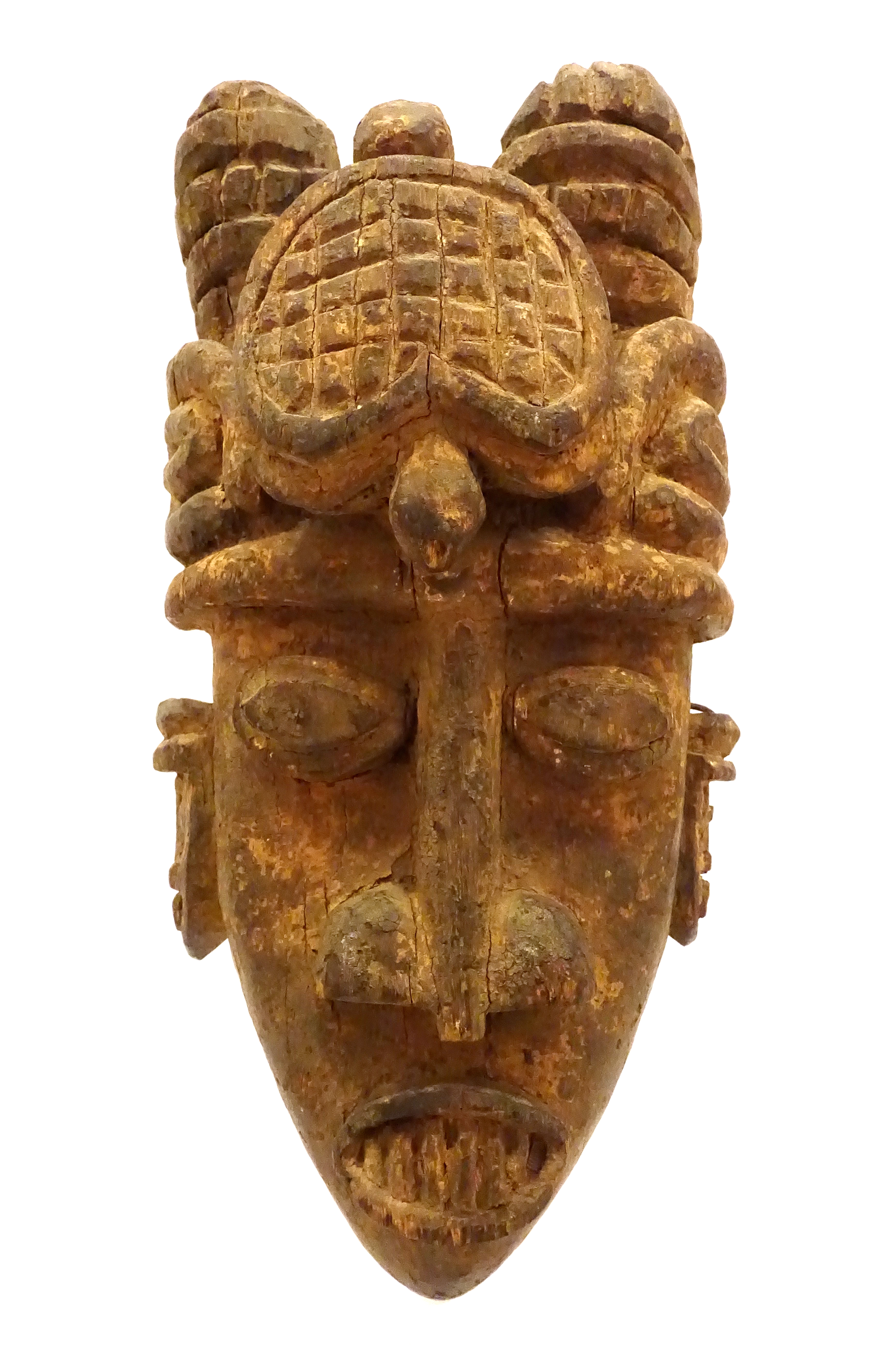
Water spirit head crest (pipligbo)

The Kalabari are a sub-group of the Ijaw people living in the eastern Niger Delta region of Nigeria. Originally, they were known as the Awome. The name Kalabari was derived from their ancestor Perebo Kalabari who was a son of Meinowei. Their original settlement was spelt as Calabar by the Portuguese which was pronounced Kalabari. This settlement (town) was abandoned as the people moved to other fishing settlements. Portuguese settlers continued to maintain the name Calabari which became surrounded by the Efik people of Duke town. When the British came the word Calabari was pronounced as Calabar (Kalaba) instead of Kalabari. At this time the original Ijoid Kalabaris had moved to a new location which became the new Calabar territory since the old Calabar is occupied by different people. Old Calabar became an Efik town with time which has the name Calabar.

Elem Kalabari became a large kingdom that has about 35 settlements including Bakana, Abonnema, Buguma, Tombia and others.

King Amachree XI (Professor Theophilus Princewill CFR), passed on and was buried in November 2023. The Kingdom is currently being overseen by a Regent till a new king is crowned.

The king along with his Chiefs, most of whom are royal princes, form the royal court.

== History ==
The Kalabari people are Ijaw speaking settlers who came from the lineage of a man called Mein Owei. The people were originally fishermen before the coming of the Portuguese to the West African coastline.

The Kalabari, like most Nigerian coastline tribes, were wealthy as a result of their interactions with the Europeans. There are some Ijaw who consider the Kalabari as a different ethnic group and vice versa.

Historically Kalabari settlements have always been close to a river, this is because they believed their powers came from deities in the water.

== Food ==
There are a variety of traditional dishes (or native food) of the Kalabari, the three popular dishes are Onunu (pounded yam, ripe plantain and palm oil), Tominafulo (fresh fish, prawns, periwinkle and oyster and other local ingredients), Odo’fulo (aka Native Soup made with fresh seafood and other local ingredients).

Marriage

Kalabari people have one of the cheapest forms of legal marriage in the south-south region of Nigeria, their marriage is cheap compared to the neighbouring cites such as the Ikwerre, Okrika, Ahoada, Ogoni, Bonny, and Opobo. The cheapest form of marriage which is recognized in Kalabari is called "Ari Ibara emi" (meaning she is with me). As the name implies, her parents should not look for her elsewhere, for she is with me. Kalabari tribe has about three types of marriages, the Iya, Igwa, and Waribiobesime. The Iya marriage is said to be the highest and most expensive form of marriage in the Kalabari culture. The Iya is the most expensive form of marriage in Kalabari land. The special thing about this type of marriage ceremony is that, at first, there are some catchy traditions that may seem weird for other cultures or tribes, but all of them are respected and they must be honored in the ceremony. For instance, the marriage cannot be complete until the ceremony of BIBIFE (buying the mouth) is being done. BIBIFE signifies that the potential wife can not eat any food until her “mouth is bought”. There must be a rite in order to “buy her mouth” and only after that, she is able to eat in her husband's house. This BIBIFE signifies the responsibility and role of the man towards his wife that shows his willingness to care and feed her for the rest of her life.

== List of towns, villages and fishing settlement in Kalabari ==
Abonnema, Abalama, Abisse, Angulama, Aleleama, Atuka, Angalabio, Adumama, Amosama, Buguma, Bukuma, Bakana, Captain kiri, Cawthrone Channel, Dialafiari ama, Elem Tombia, Elem Kalabari, Elem Ido, Elem Ifoko, Elem Bekinama, Elem Abalama, Elem Sangama, Horsefall ama, Harrison ama, Ido, Idama, Ilelema, Ifoko, Ipokuma, Kula, krakrama, ke, Kien ama, Minama, Mbiakafiama, Ngeribarama, Oporoama, Obonoma, Oguruama, Okpo, Owoko, Obuama, Omekweama, Omekwetariama, Ogo ama, Opubenibo ama, Soku, Sama, Sangama, Tema, Tombia, Usokun, Ipokuma Degema consulate, Arugbana, Ekweoboko.

== See also ==
- Duein Fubara - A Kalabari altar screen
