= Bille, Nigeria =

Town in Rivers, Nigeria

Bille
- Town
- Bille Town
- Interactive map of Bille
- Coordinates: 4.5763°N 6.8888°E
- Country: Nigeria
- State: Rivers
- Seat: Bille Town

Government
  - Type: Traditional Monarchy
  - Body: Council of Chiefs
  - Amanyanabo or Siyedabo: HRM Hon. King Igbikingeri Ngowari Cornelius Herbert (AgbaniyeJike XVIII) Amanayabo of Bille Kingdom

Population
  - Estimate (2016): 41,000
- Time zone: WAT (UTC+1)
- Zip Code: 504102

Bille is a coastal town located in the Degema Local Government Area of Rivers State, Nigeria. It serves as the administrative center of the Bille kingdom. The town's residents are of Ijaw descent, and its location along the state's coastline makes it accessible only by water. It is located at coordinates 4.5763° N, 6.8888° E.

In the past, Bille was divided into two sections by a natural channel, known as kala anga and opu anga. In the late 1970s, land reclamation efforts connected the southern areas, Angula and Osia, to the mainland, expanding the town. The community continues to extend into the mangrove forest through ongoing reclamation projects.

The population of Bille Town is estimated to be around 41,000. The community is widely recognized for its traditional fishing practices, which remain a central aspect of its economy and culture. To improve accessibility and transportation, the Rivers State government, led by Governor Nyesom Wike, commissioned a modern jetty to support the movement of people and goods between Bille and the mainland.

Bille is also an important tourist destination in Rivers State, known for its cultural heritage and historical significance. The kingdom is currently led by His Royal Majesty, Hon. King Igbikingeri Ngowari Cornelius Herbert (AgbaniyeJike XVIII), who ascended to the throne on April 4, 2021. His coronation marked the end of a 12-year gap following the passing of the previous ruler, His Royal Majesty, King Justus H. Igolima-Dappa (AgbaniyeJike XVII).

The town is rich in hydrocarbon resources and has been involved in notable legal cases related to oil spills, including a dispute with Shell Oil Company and the neighboring Oghale community.
