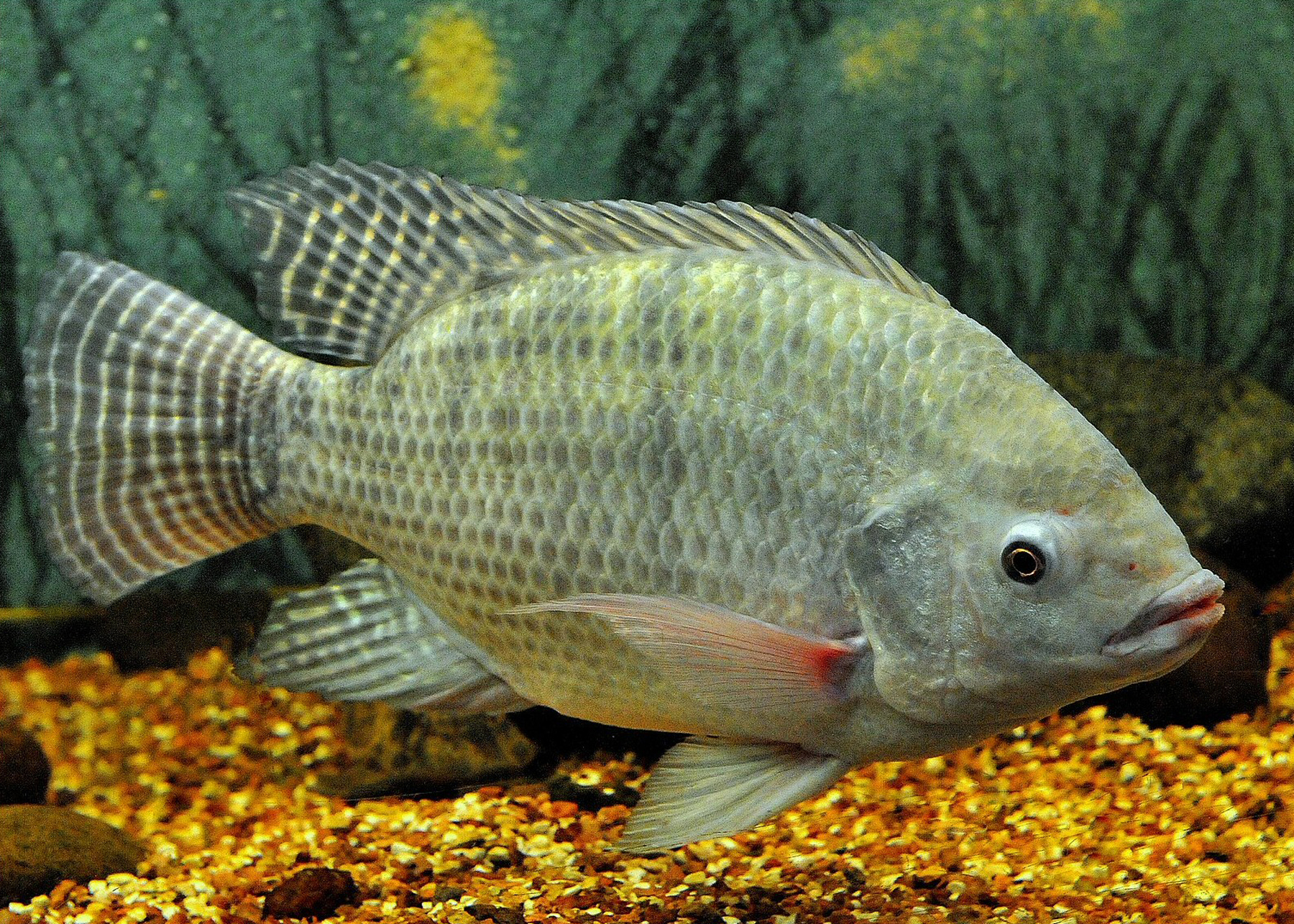

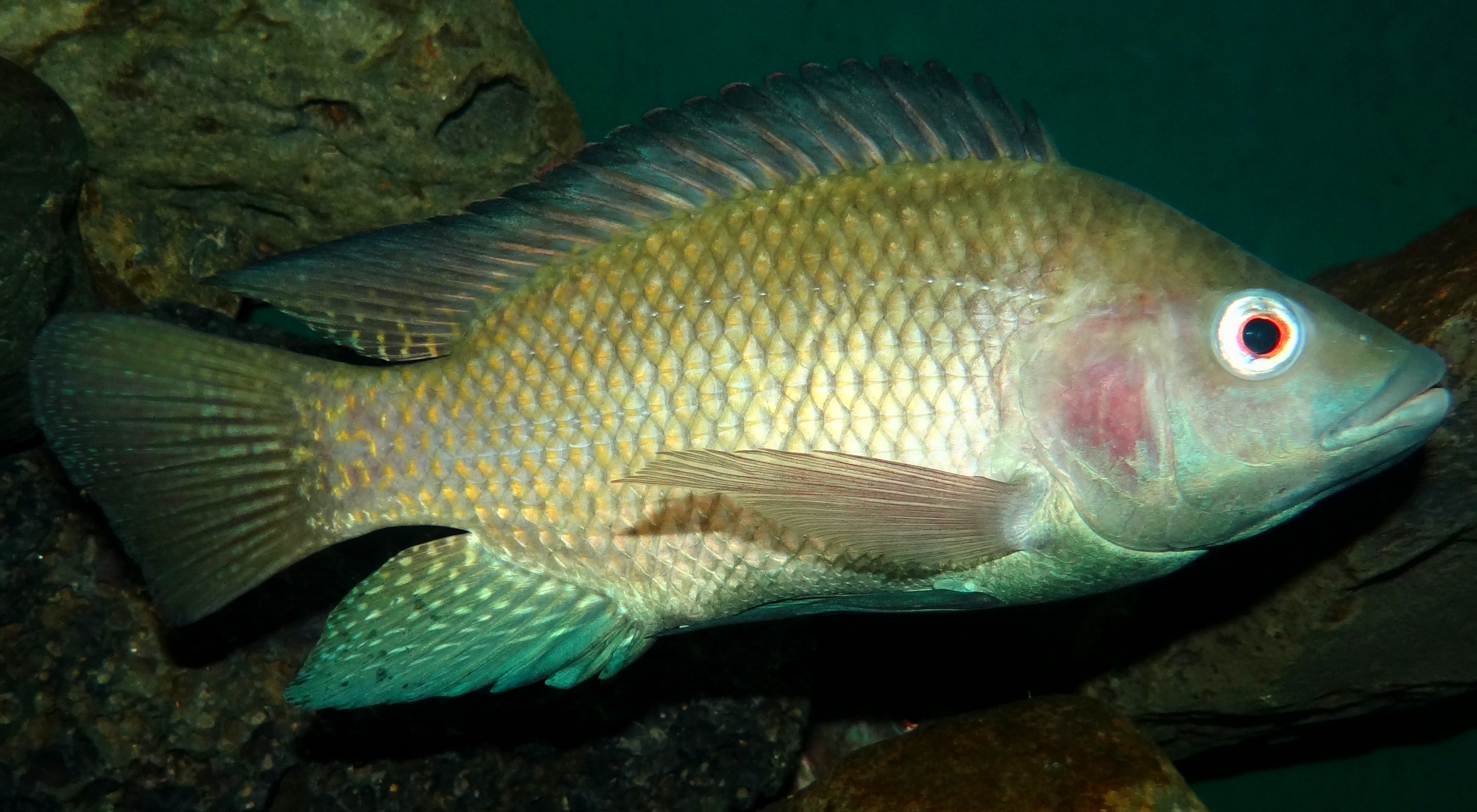
- Wild type above, aquacultured type (likely of hybrid origin) below

Conservation status
- Least Concern (IUCN 3.1)

Scientific classification
- Kingdom: Animalia
- Phylum: Chordata
- Class: Actinopterygii
- Division: Teleostei
- Order: Cichliformes
- Family: Cichlidae
- Genus: Oreochromis
- Species: O. niloticus

Binomial name
- Oreochromis niloticus (Linnaeus, 1758)

Synonyms
- Synonyms list: Tilapia crassispina Arambourg, 1948; Perca nilotica Linnaeus, 1758; Chromis nilotica (Linnaeus, 1758); Chromis niloticus (Linnaeus, 1758); Oreochromis nilotica (Linnaeus, 1758); Oreochromis niloticus niloticus (Linnaeus, 1758); Sarotherodon niloticus (Linnaeus, 1758); Tilapia nilotica (Linnaeus, 1758); Tilapia nilotica nilotica (Linnaeus, 1758); Chromis guentheri Steindachner, 1864; Tilapia eduardiana Boulenger, 1912; Oreochromis niloticus eduardianus (Boulenger, 1912); Tilapia nilotica eduardiana Boulenger, 1912; Tilapia cancellata Nichols, 1923; Oreochromis cancellatus cancellatus (Nichols, 1923); Oreochromis niloticus cancellatus (Nichols, 1923); Tilapia nilotica cancellata Nichols, 1923; Tilapia calciati Gianferrari, 1924; Tilapia regani Poll, 1932; Tilapia nilotica regani Poll, 1932; Tilapia inducta Trewavas, 1933; Tilapia vulcani Trewavas, 1933; Oreochromis niloticus vulcani (Trewavas, 1933); Oreochromis vulcani (Trewavas, 1933); Oreochromis niloticus baringoensis Trewavas, 1983; Oreochromis niloticus filoa Trewavas, 1983; Oreochromis cancellatus filoa Trewavas, 1983; Oreochromis niloticus sugutae Trewavas, 1983; Oreochromis niloticus tana Seyoum & Kornfield, 1992

= Nile tilapia =

Species of cichlid fish

The Nile tilapia (Oreochromis niloticus) is a species of tilapia, a cichlid occurring naturally in parts of Africa (such as its namesake Nile River) and the Levant, though numerous introduced populations exist outside its natural range. This current wide range is caused by its high commercial value as a food fish, where it is marketed as mango fish (not to be confused with the mango tilapia, or Sarotherodon galilaeus), nilotica, or boulti, along with many other names, both local and foreign. Due to its value, the Nile tilapia is widely aquacultured across the world due to its hardiness and a mode of reproduction conducive to mass rearing, namely mouthbrooding, and various attempts have been made to increase production yields, including hybridization with other tilapias.

== Description ==
The Nile tilapia reaches up to 60 cm (24 in) in length, and can exceed 5 kg (11 lb). As typical of tilapia, males reach a larger size and grow faster than females.

Wild, natural-type Nile tilapias are brownish or grayish overall, often with indistinct banding on their body, and the tail is vertically striped. When breeding, males become reddish, especially on their fins. It is commonly confused with the blue tilapia (O. aureus); that species lacks the striped tail pattern, has a red edge to the dorsal fin (this edge is gray or black in Nile tilapia), and males are bluish overall when breeding. The two species can also be separated by meristics. Because many tilapia in aquaculture and introduced around the world are selectively bred variants and/or hybrids, identifying them using the standard features that can be used in the wild, natural types is often not possible. The virtually unknown O. ismailiaensis has a plain tail, but otherwise closely resembles (and may only be a variant of) the Nile tilapia. Regardless, O. ismailiaensis might be extinct, as its only known habitat in northeastern Egypt has disappeared, although similar-looking individuals (perhaps the same) are known from the vicinity.

Nile tilapia can live for more than 10 years.

== Range and habitat ==
The Nile tilapia is native to larger parts of Africa, except Maghreb and almost all of Southern Africa. It is native to tropical West Africa, the Lake Chad basin, and much of the Nile system, including lakes Tana, Albert and Edward–George, as well as lakes Kivu, Tanganyika, and Turkana, and the Awash and Omo Rivers. In Israel, it is native to coastal river basins. It has been widely introduced elsewhere, both in Africa and other continents, including tens of countries in Asia, Europe, North America, and South America. In these places, it often becomes highly invasive, threatening the native ecosystems and species. However, some introduced populations historically labelled as Nile tilapia either are hybrids or another species; the Nile tilapia and blue tilapia especially often have been confused. In India, especially in the southern state of Tamil Nadu, the Nile Tilapia was introduced by K. Kamaraj, the then Chief Minister and has become a threat to the native fish species hence.

The Nile tilapia can be found in most types of freshwater habitats, such as rivers, streams, canals, lakes, and ponds, and ranging from sea level to an altitude of 1,830 m (6,000 ft). It also occurs in brackish water, but is unable to survive long-term in full salt water. The species has been recorded at water temperatures between 8 and 42 °C (46 and 108 °F), although typically above 13.5 °C (56.5 °F), and the upper lethal limit usually is at 39–40 °C (102–104 °F). Also, some variations occur depending on the population. For example, those in the northern part of its range survive down to the coldest temperatures, while isolated populations in hot springs in the Awash Basin and at Suguta River generally live in waters that are at least 32–33 °C (90–91 °F). Although Nile tilapia can survive down to relatively cold temperatures, breeding generally only occurs when the water reaches 24 °C (75 °F).

=== Subspecies ===
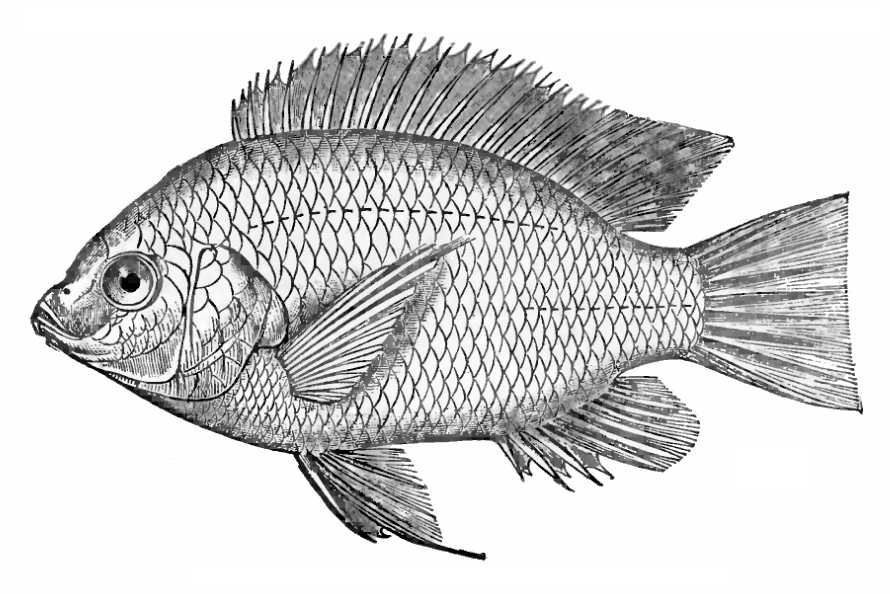
O. n. niloticus

Although FishBase considers the species as monotypic, several distinctive populations often are recognized as valid subspecies:

- O. n. niloticus (Linnaeus, 1758) – most of species' range
- O. n. baringoensis Trewavas, 1983 – Lake Baringo in Kenya
- O. n. cancellatus (Nichols, 1923) – Awash basin in Ethiopia
- O. n. eduardianus (Boulenger, 1912) – Albertine Rift Valley lakes
- O. n. filoa Trewavas, 1983 – hot springs in Awash basin in Ethiopia
- O. n. sugutae Trewavas, 1983 – Karpeddo soda springs at Suguta River in Kenya
- O. n. tana Seyoum & Kornfield, 1992 – Lake Tana in Ethiopia
- O. n. vulcani Trewavas, 1933 – Lake Turkana in Ethiopia and Kenya

While the species is overall very widespread and common, the IUCN considers O. n. baringoensis as endangered, O. n. sugutae as vulnerable, and O. n. filoa as data deficient.

A population found in Lake Bogoria appears to be an undescribed subspecies.

The forms referred to as Oreochromis (or Tilapia) nyabikere and kabagole seem to belong to this species, too. An undescribed population found at, for example, Wami River, Lake Manyara, and Tingaylanda seems to be a close relative.

== Behavior ==
=== Feeding ===
The Nile tilapia is mostly a herbivore, but with omnivorous tendencies especially when young. They mostly feed on phytoplankton and algae, and in some populations macrophytes (aquatic plants) also are important. Other recorded food items are detritus and aquatic insect larvae, including those of mosquitoes, making it a possible tool in the fight against malaria in Africa, which has precipitated its status as an invasive.

The Nile tilapia typically feeds during daytime, which suggests that, similar to trout and salmon, it exhibits a behavioral response to light as a main factor contributing to feeding activity. Due to its fast reproductive rate, however, overpopulation often results within groups of Nile tilapia. To obtain the necessary nutrients, night feeding may also occur due to competition for food during daylight. A recent study found evidence that, contrary to popular belief, size dimorphism between the sexes results from differential food conversion efficiency rather than different amounts of food consumed. Hence, although males and females eat equal amounts of food, males tend to grow larger due to a higher efficiency of converting food to body weight.

=== Sociality ===
Like other fish, Nile tilapia travel almost exclusively in schools. Groups of Nile tilapia establish social hierarchies in which the dominant males have priority for both food and mating. Circular nests are built predominantly by males through mouth digging to become future spawning sites. These nests often become sites of intense courtship rituals and parental care. Although males settle down in their crafted nesting zones, females travel between zones to find mates, resulting in competition between the males for females.

Like other tilapias, such as the Mozambique tilapia, dominance between the males is established first through noncontact displays such as lateral display and tail beats. Unsuccessful attempts to reconcile the hierarchy results in contact fighting to inflict injuries. Nile tilapia have been observed to modify their fighting behavior based upon experiences during development. Thus, experience in a certain form of agonistic behavior results in differential aggressiveness among individuals. Once the social hierarchy is established within a group, the dominant males enjoy the benefits of both increased access to food and an increased number of mates. However, social interactions between males in the presence of females results in higher energy expenditures as a consequence of courtship displays and sexual competition.

=== Reproduction ===
Typical of most fish, Nile tilapia reproduce through mass spawning of a brood within a nest made by the male. In such an arrangement, territoriality and sexual competition amongst the males lead to large variations in reproductive success for individuals in a group. The genetic consequence of such behavior is reduced genetic variability in the long run, as inbreeding is likely to occur among different generations due to differential male reproductive success. Perhaps driven by reproductive competition, tilapias reproduce within a few months after birth. The relatively young age of sexual maturation within Nile tilapia leads to high birth and turnover rates; consequently, the rapid reproductive rate of individuals can actually have a negative impact on growth rate, leading to the appearance of stunted tilapia as a result of a reduction in somatic growth in favor of sexual maturation.

Female Nile tilapia, in the presence of other females either visually or chemically, exhibit shortened interspawning intervals. Although parental investment by a female extends the interspawning period, female tilapia that abandon their young to the care of a male gain this advantage of increased interspawning periods. One of the possible purposes behind this mechanism is to increase the reproductive advantage of females that do not have to care for young, allowing them more opportunities to spawn. For males, reproductive advantage goes to the more dominant males. Males have differential levels of gonadotropic hormones responsible for spermatogenesis, with dominant males having higher levels of the hormone. Thus, selection has favored larger sperm production with more successful males. Similarly, dominant males have both the best territory in terms of resources and the greatest access to mates. Furthermore, visual communication between Nile tilapia mates both stimulates and modulates reproductive behavior between partners such as courtship, spawning frequency, and nest building.

=== Parental care ===
Species belonging to the genus Oreochromis typically care for their young through mouthbrooding, oral incubation of the eggs and larvae. Similar to other tilapia, Nile tilapia are maternal mouthbrooders and care is provided almost exclusively by the female; the mother extensively cares for the young. After spawning in a nest made by a male, the young fry or eggs are carried in the mouth of the mother for a period of 12 days. Sometimes, the mother pushes the young back into her mouth if she believes they are not ready for the outside. Nile tilapias also demonstrate parental care in times of danger. When approached by a danger, the young often swim back into the protection of their mother's mouth. However, mouthbrooding leads to significant metabolic modifications for the parents, usually the mother, as she cannot eat during this period. This reflected by fluctuations in body weight and low fitness. Thus, parental-offspring conflict can be observed through the costs and benefits of mouthbrooding. Protection of the young ensures passage of an individual's genes into the future generations, but caring for the young also reduces an individual's own reproductive fitness.

Since female Nile tilapia exhibiting parental care show extended interspawning periods, one of the benefits is slowing down vitellogenesis (yolk deposition) to increase the survival rate of one's own young. The size of spawned eggs correlates directly with advantages concerning hatching time, growth, survival, and onset of feeding, since increased egg size means increased nutrients for the developing young. Thus, one of the reasons behind a delayed interspawning period by female Nile tilapia may be for the benefit of offspring survival.

== Human use ==
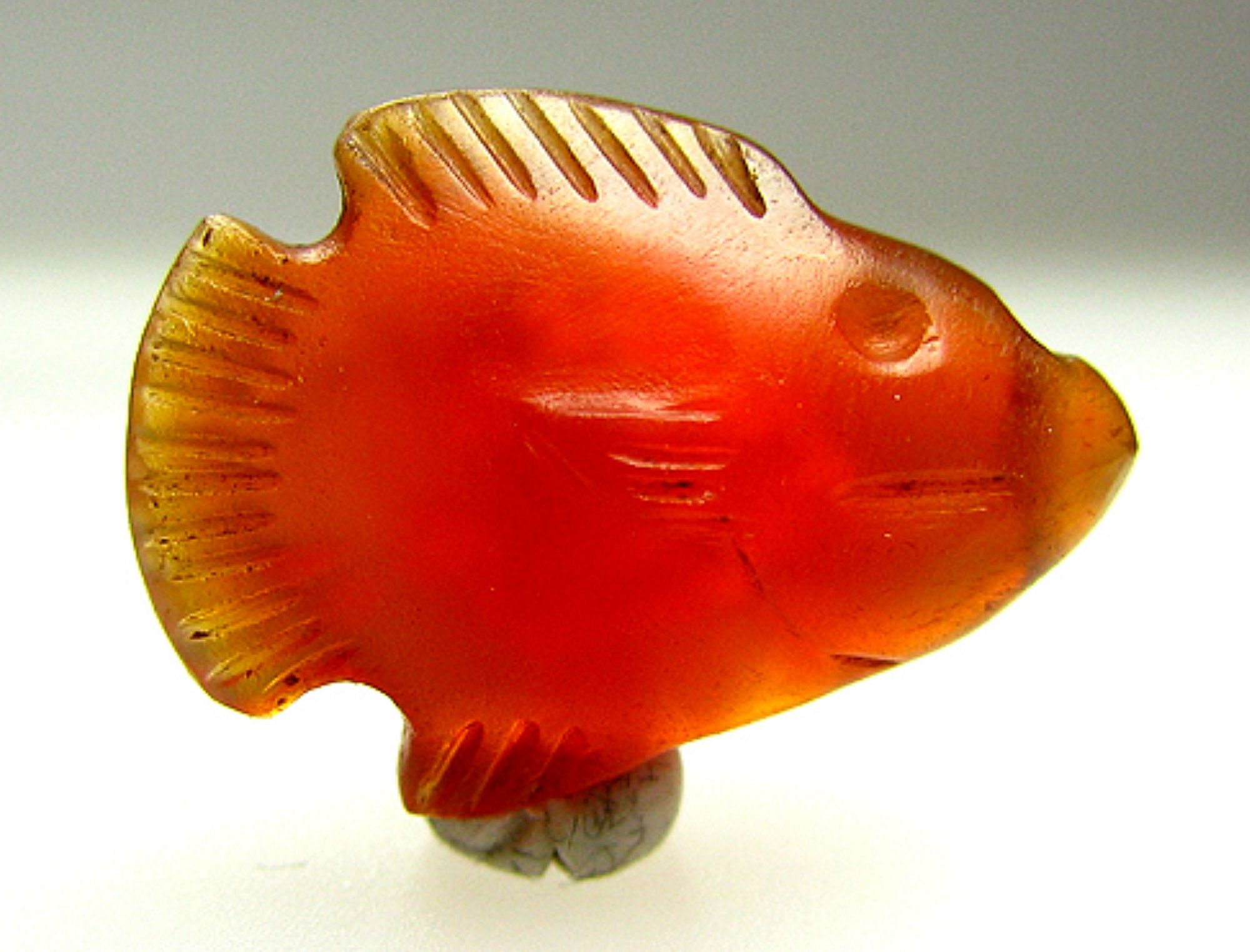
An Egyptian New Kingdom amulet in the shape of a tilapia hieroglyph from circa 1350/1320 BC

Tilapia, likely the Nile tilapia, was well known as food fish in Ancient Egypt and commonly featured in their art (paintings and sculptures). This includes a 4000-year-old tomb illustration that shows them in man-made ponds, likely an early form of aquaculture. In modern aquaculture, wild-type Nile tilapia are not farmed very often because the dark color of their flesh is undesirable for many customers, and because of the reputation the fish has as being a trash fish. However, they are fast-growing and produce good fillets; leucistic breeds (which appear red) have lighter meat; they were developed to counter the consumer distaste for darker meat.

Hybrid stock is also used in aquaculture; Nile × blue tilapia hybrids are usually rather dark, but a light-colored hybrid breed known as "Rocky Mountain White" tilapia is often grown due to its very light flesh and tolerance of low temperatures.

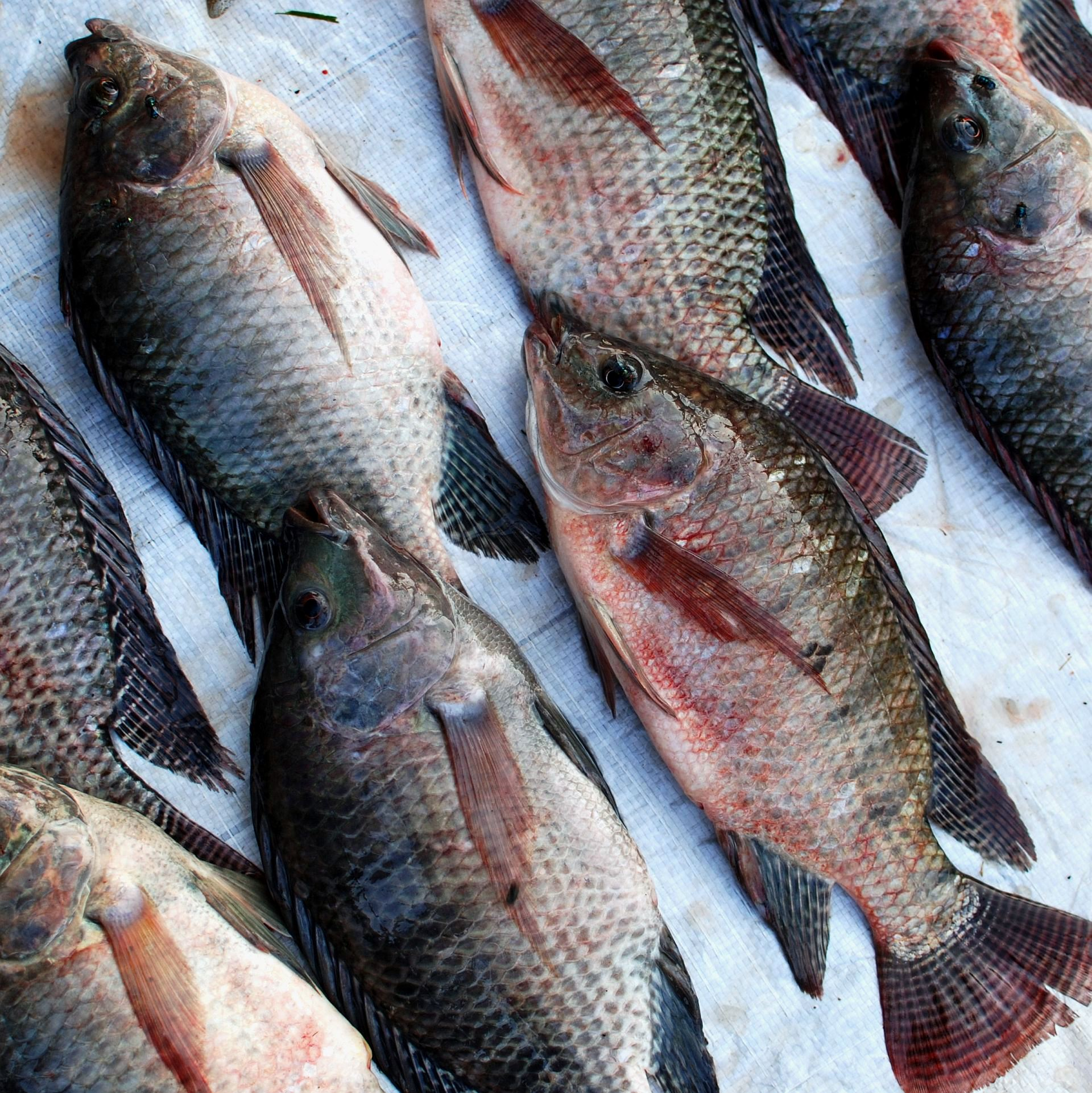
Live pla nin on a table at a Thai market

The red hybrid tilapia is known in the Thai language as pla thapthim (Thai: ปลาทับทิม, pronounced [plaːtʰap̚˦˥.tʰim]), meaning "pomegranate fish" or "ruby fish". This type of tilapia is very popular in Thai cuisine, where it is prepared in a variety of ways.

The black-and-white-striped tilapia pla nin (Thai: ปลานิล, pronounced [plaːnin]), has darker flesh and is commonly either salted and grilled or deep-fried, and it can also be steamed with lime (pla nin nueng manao).

50 fish were first brought to Thailand as a gift to King Bhumibol Adulyadej (Rama IX) on March 25, 1965 by Crown Prince Akihito of Japan (later Emperor Akihito). The king raised them in a pond at the fish farm project in the area of the Royal Chitralada Palace. In addition, he also gave them a Thai common name, pla nin which literally translates to "black fish" or "ceylonite fish", and also refers to the Nile River, their original source.

Nile tilapia, called بلطي bulṭī in Arabic, is among the most common fish in Egyptian cuisine (being a native species), and probably the most common in inland regions far from the coast. It is generally either battered and pan-fried whole (بلطي مقلي bulṭī maqlī [bʊltˤiː maʔliː]) or grilled whole (بلطي مشوي bulṭī mashwī [bʊltˤiː maʃwiː]). Like other fish in Egypt, they are generally served with rice cooked with onions and other seasonings to turn it red.

In Israel, Nile tilapia is commonly fried, grilled or baked with vegetables herbs and spices and eaten with rice or bulgur pilafs. It is also baked in the oven with tahini sauce drizzled over it with potatoes, onions, asparagus, sweet peppers or tomatoes and flavored with sumac and dried mint.

Tilapia, often farmed, is a popular and common supermarket fish in the United States.

In India, Nile tilapia is the most dominant fish in some of the South Indian reservoirs and available throughout the year. O. niloticus grows faster and reaches bigger sizes in a given time. The littoral areas of Kelavarappalli Reservoir are full of nests of Nile tilapia and they breed during south-west monsoon (July–September). The fish mainly feed on detritus. Zooplankton, phytoplankton, and macrophytes also were recorded occasionally from the gut of Nile tilapia. The demand is heavy, especially from local poor people, as this fish is affordable to the lowest income group in this area.

Due to its fast-growing nature, its mostly herbivorous diet, and its nutrition value, tilapia has been identified as a suitable alternative to brine shrimp and golden apple snails for space aquaculture in locations where the superior taste of tilapia is worth the production inefficiencies (such as in established off-world settlements). A transgenic strain of tilapia was developed in Japan to optimize the species for closed recirculating aquaculture.

== See also ==
- Nile perch — a similarly-named but different fish that grows much larger and is highly predatory
- Fishing in Egypt
- Fishing in Israel
