= Duein Fubara =

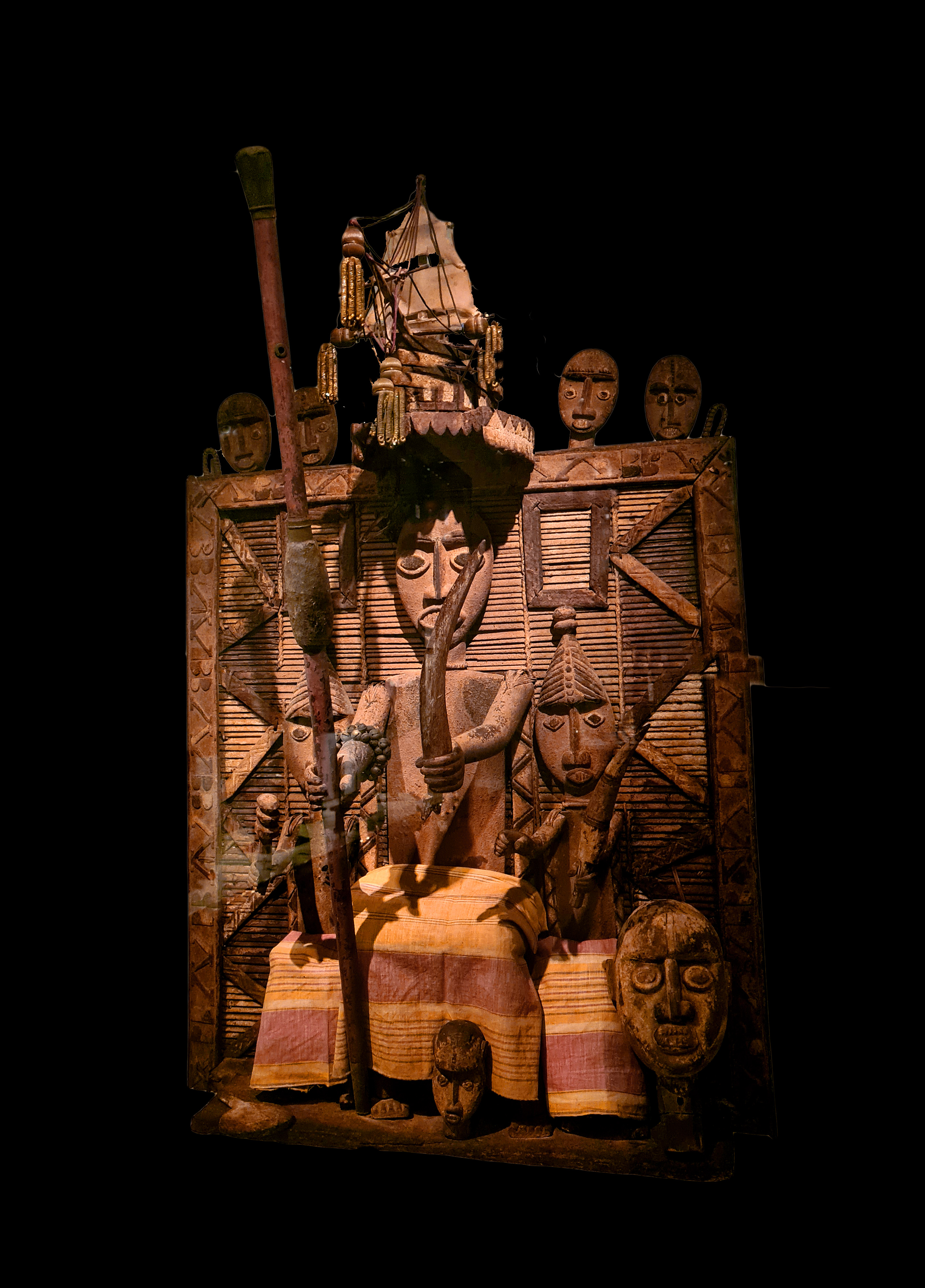
Duein Fubara (British Museum)

The Duein Fubara is a Nigerian Ancestral Altar Screen.

== The Kalabari ==
Location of Nigeria within Africa

The Duein Fubara was created by the Kalabari Ijo of the Niger River delta. The Kalabari are a West African ethnic group, primarily residing on the Niger River Delta. Today, this area is within the modern state of Nigeria, more specifically within Rivers State.

== History ==
The production of Altar Screens, similar to this example, began in the second half of the 19th century. Although this particular object has a vague history, the Art Institute of Chicago (where the particular Old World object in question is now held) states that the Duein Fubara was created around the beginning of the 20th century. The Duein Fubara was purchased by the institution in 2005 from Charlie Davis, a prominent collector of African art based in New Orleans. He had acquired the piece on one of his routine art collecting trips to Africa. Prior to Davis’ purchase of the Duein Fubara in 1994, the Duein Fubara had been owned by an anonymous individual residing in Lomé, Togo. Prior to that, until around 1990, the work resided within Rivers State, Nigeria, its place of origin, presumably since its construction.

== The Artwork ==
The Duein Fubara is an ancestral or memorial altar screen, made in order to commemorate the leader of a trading house after his death. The title of “Duein Fubara” translates into English as “foreheads of the dead”, as the forehead is believed to hold a spiritual significance. The artwork exemplifies this, as the size of the main figure's head is greatly exaggerated, extending beyond the top of the frame. The materials used in the construction of the Duein Fubara are listed by the Art Institute of Chicago as “wood, pigment, fiber, and replacement fabric”. Because the Kalabari held wood in high esteem, the use of wood as the primary construction material is significant—constructing not only these ancestral screens out of wood, but other objects that may be related with an individual, such as sculptures and masks. Through the wood used in construction, the power of these deceased or legendary individuals can be retrieved and utilized in economic or political actions. In the case of the Duein Fubara, the power of the leader it was built in order to commemorate resides in the wood of the artwork. Mirrors, also depicted on the Duein Fubara, hold a similar significance in representing communication with the deceased. The mirrors act as portals to another world, bridging the gap between the living and deceased. This supports the original intent of the screen as a container for its memorialized spirit, or functioning as tool of communication.

== European influence ==
The Duein Fubara is the product of European presence and legacy in West Africa, as the construction of the Duein Fubara, along with similar artworks, exhibits knowledge of European joinery techniques. These techniques would have been learned from ships’ carpenters during ongoing trade between Europeans and the Kalabari. Similar to a ship's construction, the screens are made of pieces of wood that are held together using shipbuilding techniques such as joinery, ties, pegs, and nails. Additionally, with the development of photography, and its introduction to West Africa by the Europeans, the Kalabari peoples took on and adapted a photographic style. This style incorporated front facing poses for those depicted. The altar screens, coming about in the mid-19th century with the development of photography, were directly influenced by the technology. The top hats and bowler hats worn by the individuals of the Duein Fubara show European influence as well as layers of social stratification. European articles of clothing such as these became symbols of prestige.

== See also ==
- African art in Western collections
- Culture of Nigeria
- Colonisation of Africa
