= August 2009 Egyptian hostage escape =

On August 13, 2009, Egyptians captured by Somali pirates and held hostage for ransom attacked their captors, using whatever was at their disposal before seizing weapons from the pirates. They managed to overpower their captors and reach Aden, Yemen, in what was described a "daring and dramatic escape."

== Background ==
Somalia has not had an effective government since 1991, when a dictatorship was overthrown, plunging the country into chaos. The ensuing power vacuum, and the lack of authority in the country has resulted in a surge in piracy, which occurs along Somalia's 1,900-mile (3,100 km) coastline, the Gulf of Aden, and the Indian Ocean as well, areas through which run some of the world's busiest shipping lines.

The Egyptians, fishermen working for a company called Mashreq Marine Product, were captured with their two fishing vessels, Mumtaz 1 and Samara Ahmed, by Somali pirates in April 2009. Both vessels had permits to fish off Somali shores. Reports estimate two dozen to forty fishermen being captured by the Somali pirates. The latest and apparently most accurate figure, from Al-Ahram, states 33 fishermen were taken hostage. Mohamed Alnahdi, executive manager of Mashreq, negotiated with the pirates for over a month, but failed to secure the fishermen's release after the pirates, originally demanding 800,000 to $1.5 million, rejected a ransom of $200,000.

== Escape ==
The fishermen rose against their captors on August 13. They were being held on their vessels in Las Qorey, a pirate stronghold located on the coast in northern Somaliland. Despite being held on both ships and thus separated, the fisherman coordinated their actions against the captors, using the tools and machetes they were able to get hold of against the pirates, before seizing their guns and using it against them. At least two pirates were killed and an unknown number wounded. There were no casualties among the Egyptians, who took control of Momtaz 1 and Samara Ahmed and set sail for Aden, bringing along four prisoners. Local residents saw the boats leaving Las Qorey.

== Conflicting accounts ==
There have been conflicting accounts of the number of pirates killed in the struggle. Al Jazeera reports that seven pirates washed up on Somali beaches. Other news agencies report that two pirates were killed, one was wounded and fled to safety, and eight were detained and taken to Egypt. The lack of any acknowledgment of the conflicting accounts suggests the possibility that successive news agencies republished the story without doing any original research or fact checking.

== Aftermath ==
The incident was not unprecedented in that a hostage crew fought back against its captors. The first occurred in April, when 21 American crewmen fought against Somali pirates in what was known as the Maersk Alabama hijacking, until the ship's captain handed himself over as a hostage to save the lives of his crew. He was held hostage until freed by the United States Navy.

The Egyptians returned safely to Yemen, ending their four-month ordeal. The Egyptian Embassy in Sana'a offered them air travel to Egypt, but the fishermen turned down the offer, opting instead to return via their recaptured fishing vessels. They left Yemen on Friday, en route to the Ataka Port in Suez, after turning the four prisoners to Yemeni authorities, from where they will face trial on charges of piracy either in Yemen or in Somalia, while it is unlikely that they will be turned over to Egypt. The fishermen were scheduled to arrive in Suez on August 20. In Somalia another pirate was taken into custody by police after local fishermen found him on a shore, with machete wounds on his body.
