= Fishing industry in Egypt =

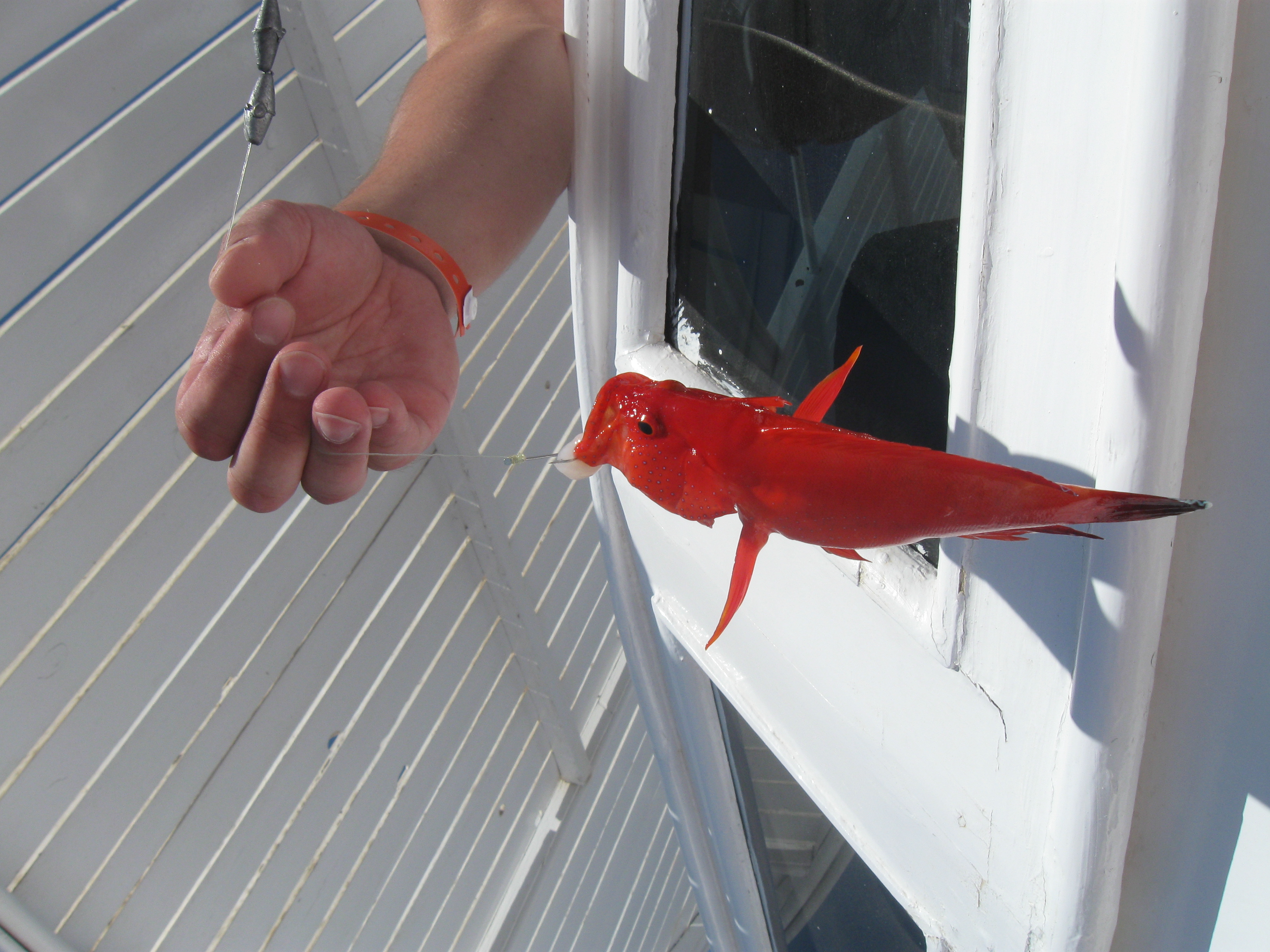
A red fish caught from the Red Sea

Fishing in Egypt includes every form of fishing as a hobby or professional nowadays. In Egypt, the fishing industry is well developed and the country is considered one of the best fishing destinations in the world.

== History, Spots, Season ==
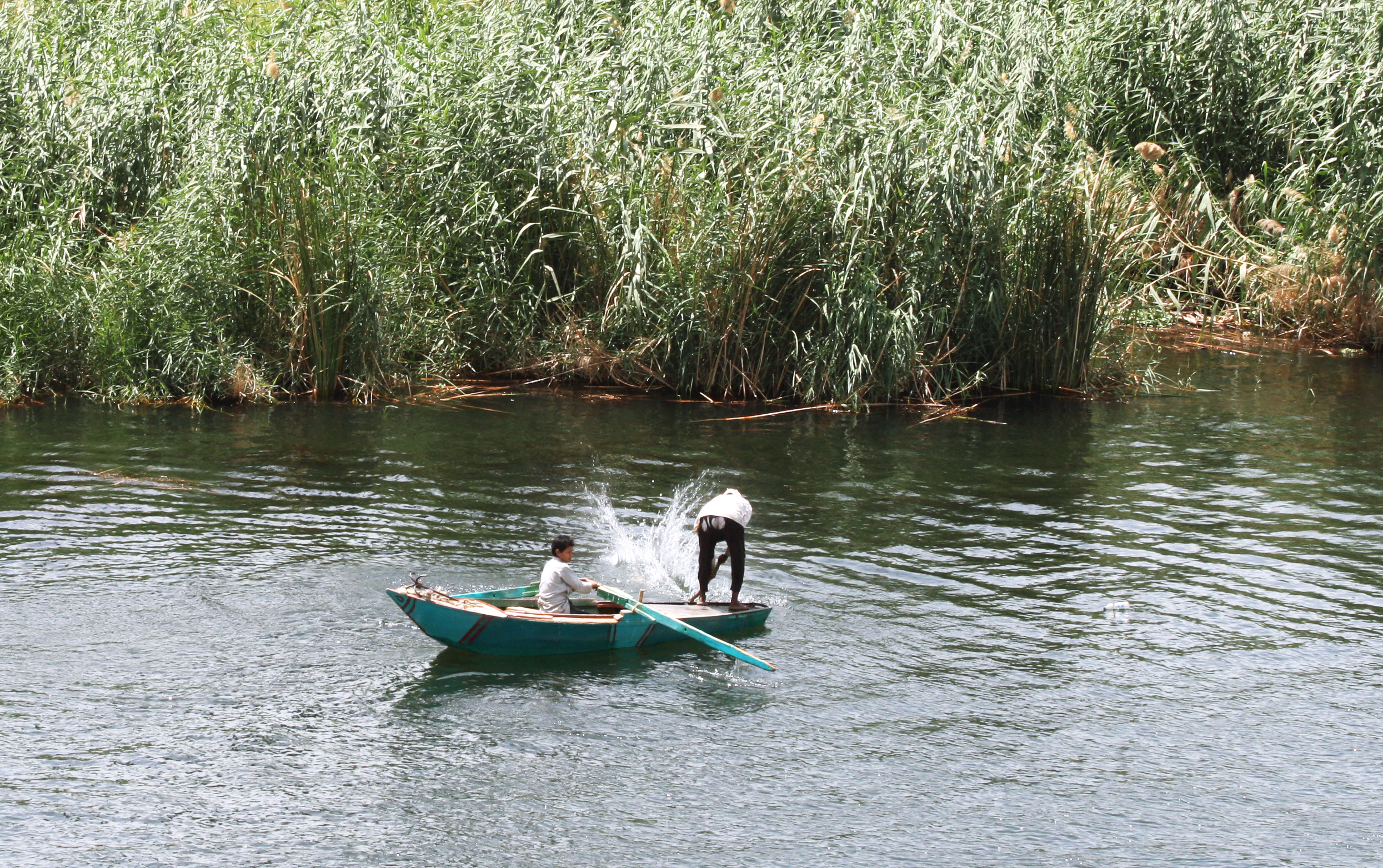
Fishing boat on the Nile during boat trip from Esna to Edfu, Egypt

The history of fishing date back to the ancient Egyptians. Egypt can be defined as the bedrock of fishing because the Egyptian civilization at the time has been one of the first to introduce this practice in the world. Nowadays, fishing is still very advanced in the country especially in the sea coasts and inland waters. The most important places are:

- The Nasser Lake
- Sharm El Sheikh
- Hurgada
- Marsa Alam
- The Nile
- The Mediterranean Sea
- The Gulf of Suez

Most of the time, fishermen go to the Red Sea coasts as Sharm El Sheikh, Hurgada or Marsa Alam which are the three most popular spots to go fishing in Egypt. The best period to catch fish stretch from January to March. However, at the Red Sea coasts it's conceivable to fish at any period of the year because even in winter the temperature is always very high and it rain very rarely. These very good climatic conditions all year round make the country be very attractive for professionals as well as beginners.

== Fishing Equipment ==
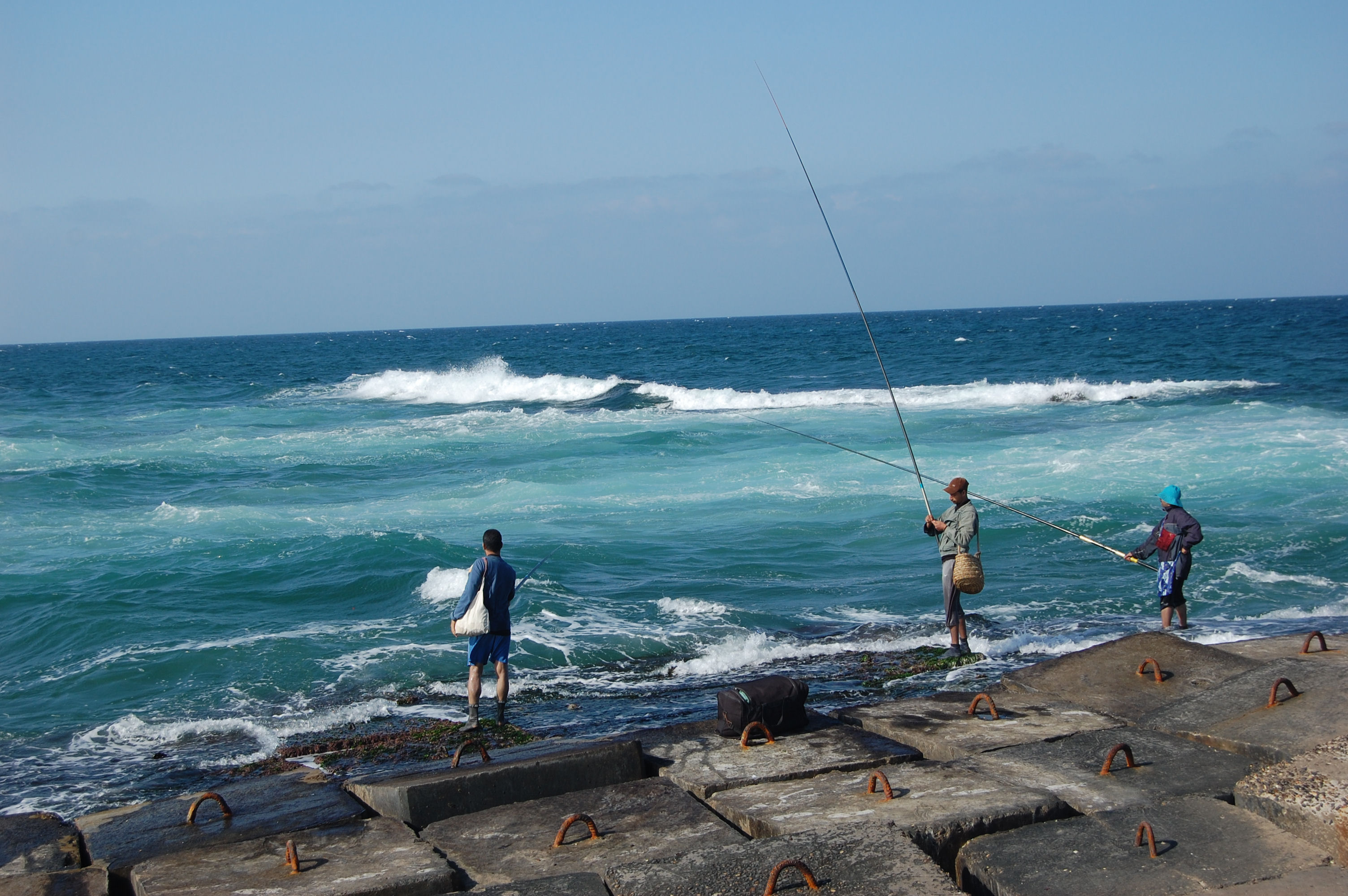
Fishermen in Alexandria, Egypt

In ancient Egypt, smaller fish were caught with weir-baskets and dragnets made from willow branches, as well as hooks, harpoons, and lines with the hooks ranging from eight millimetres and eighteen centimetres. Fishing rods tended not to be used, as the fisherman would use his finger to support the line, using clay to weigh the hooks down. For bait, usually, bread or dates would have been used. After being caught, the fish would have been clubbed and then placed in baskets.

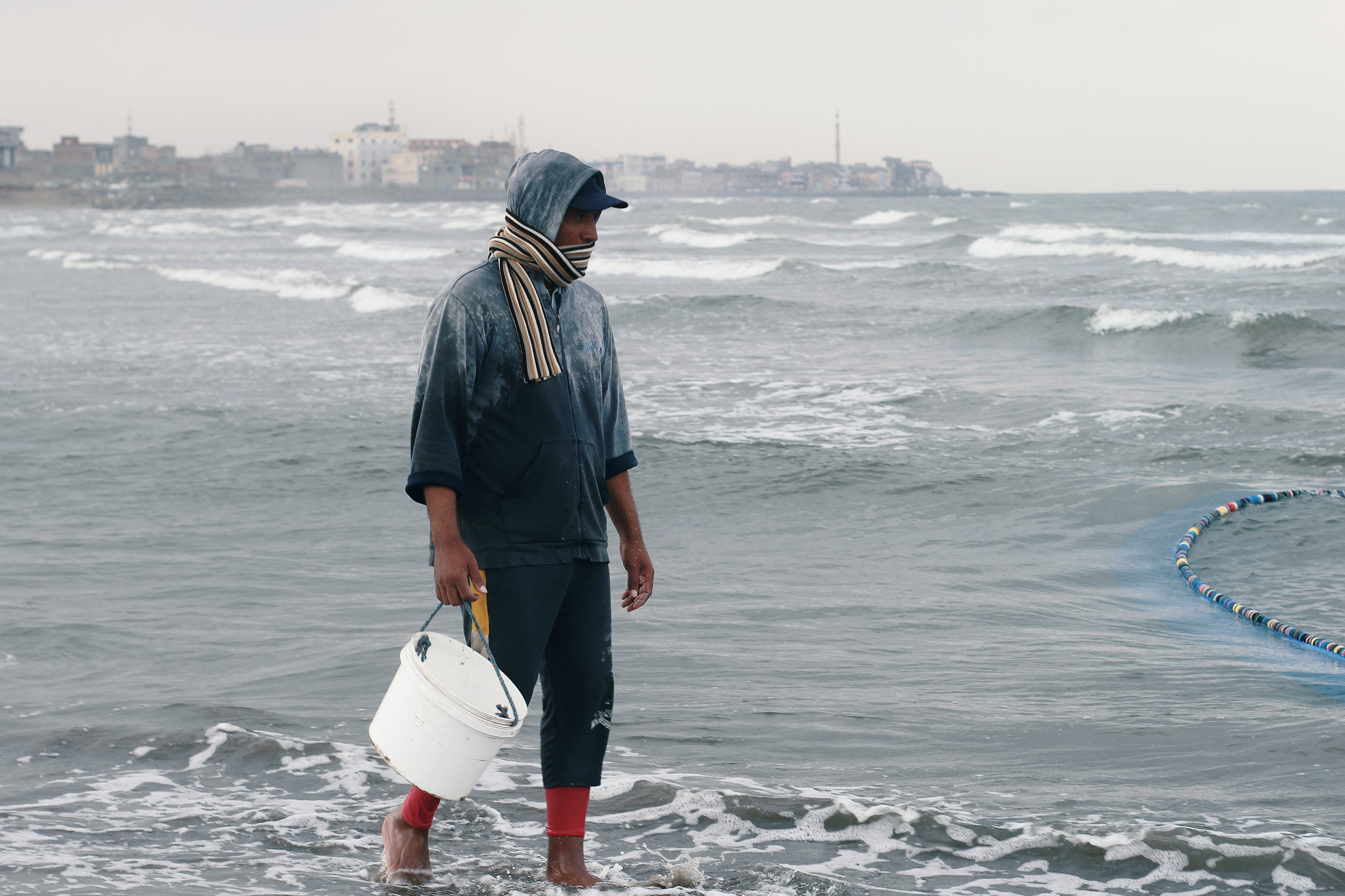
Fisherman managing a net on the coast of Egypt in Kafr El-Sheikh governorate

Big nets are used for commercial fishing where the focus is on quantity, but otherwise, for trolling, shore fishing and line fishing, the equipment used is essentially the same as is used in other parts of the world. In the Nasser Lake, the trolling rods are of 20–30 lb class and between 7 and 9 feet, alongside multipliers that are able to hold more than 200 yards of 30lb line. For shore fishing, 10–12 feet should be the size of the rod, with reels big enough to hold at least 200 yards of line. The lines used tend to be very strong thanks to the strong species of fish found, a 30-40lb monofilament is usually used for trolling and usually, for heavy-duty shore fishing, a 20lb B.S is needed. For the species of fish found in Egypt please see List of fishes in the Red Sea.

== Revenues ==
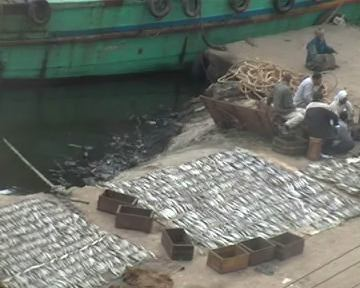
A good catch

| Production (tonnes in live weight) | Aquaculture share | Capture fisheries share | Fish farm production (tonnes) | Capture fisheries production (tonnes) | Fish available for consumption | Population (millions) |
|---|---|---|---|---|---|---|
| 2,001,148 | 80% | 20% | 1.8 million | 400,000 | 20.5 kg per capita | 114.5 |

According to recent FAO and Egyptian government data, total fisheries and aquaculture production reached approximately production in 2023 amounted to 2,001,148 tonnes which is 0.428% more than in 2022, when it was 1,992,627 tonnes. The maximum of Egypt was in 2019, when it reached 2,038,992 metric tons.

== Laws and Regulations ==
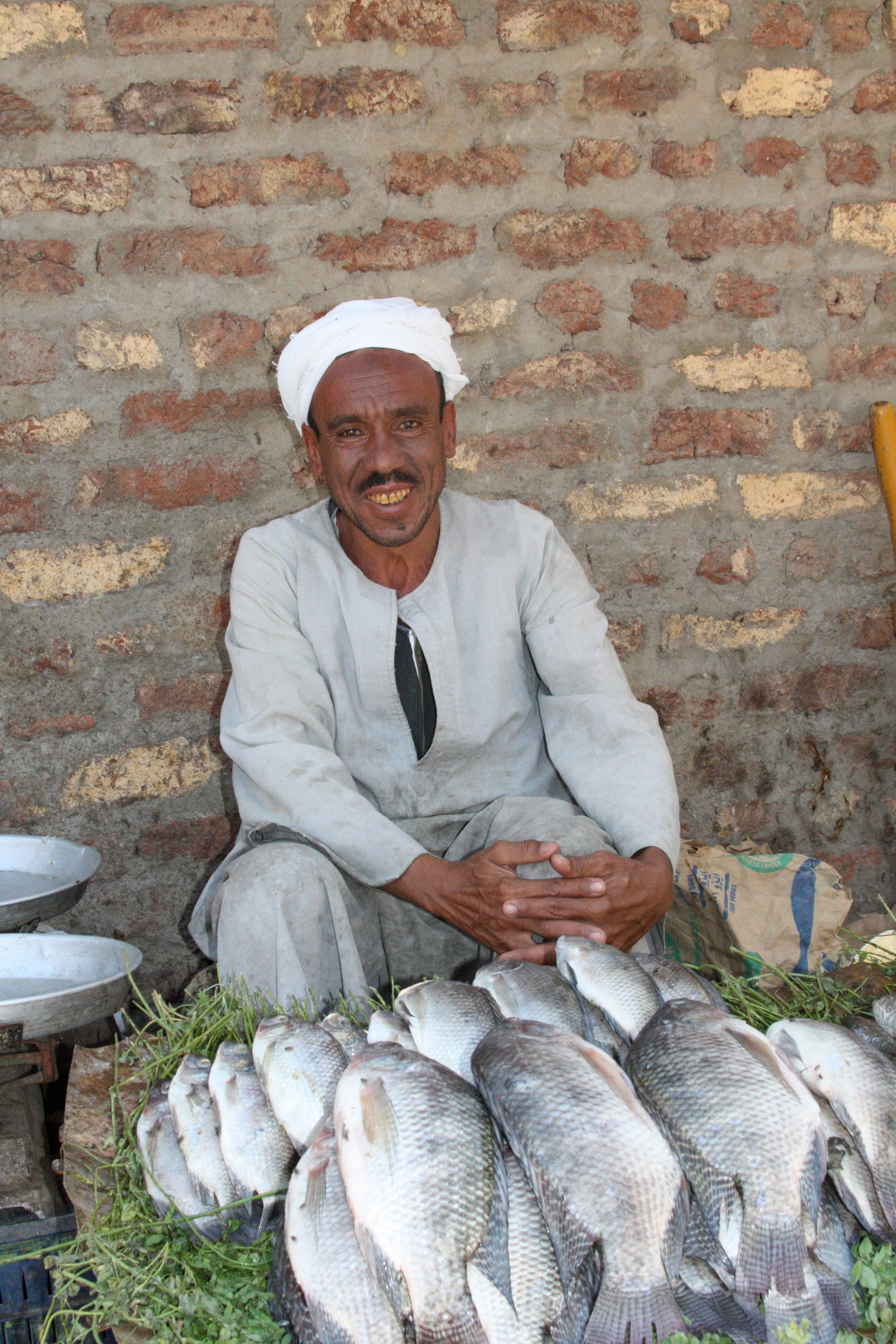
An Egyptian fisherman on a street market

Fishing in Egypt has its own rules and regulations because people tend to fish in an excessive way, in addition many fishermen use techniques that pollute the inner lakes and fishing spots. All lakes in Egypt are open to fishing except the restricted areas because its mainly touristic sight-seeing, also skiing and jet skiing is restricted in many lakes because it damages the fishing environment. Some boat types are restricted in fishing areas such as racing boats. The bass tournaments are popular between fishermen in Egypt, but to participate in such an event you have to be registered at a fishing association. These fishing tournaments are only allowed at a certain time of year so it does not damage the bass population of the lakes. It is prohibited to troll or jug in ski areas. Fishermen have a limited quantity of fish that they are allowed to fish per day and it depends on the type of fish. It is strictly prohibited to catch new born fishes because it endangers their existence. In addition, a boat cannot anchor less than 100 feet away from shoreline to respect the privacy of homeowners. Swimming is prohibited except in swimming areas for security issues, and of course skinny dipping is prohibited. Any kind of chemical treatments may not be used under any circumstances. Night lighting must within the permitted areas due to security issues. In any circumstances if rules are broken the fisherman may get arrested or may be denied of future entry to the lake.

In 2018, a state plan to purify lakes and expand fisheries increased domestic fish production. In early January 2019 Egypt imposed a 7-month ban on fishing in the Red Sea to last between February and September. An Egyptian official said the aim of seven months of prohibition was to improve the biological balance in the sea and increase fish production.
