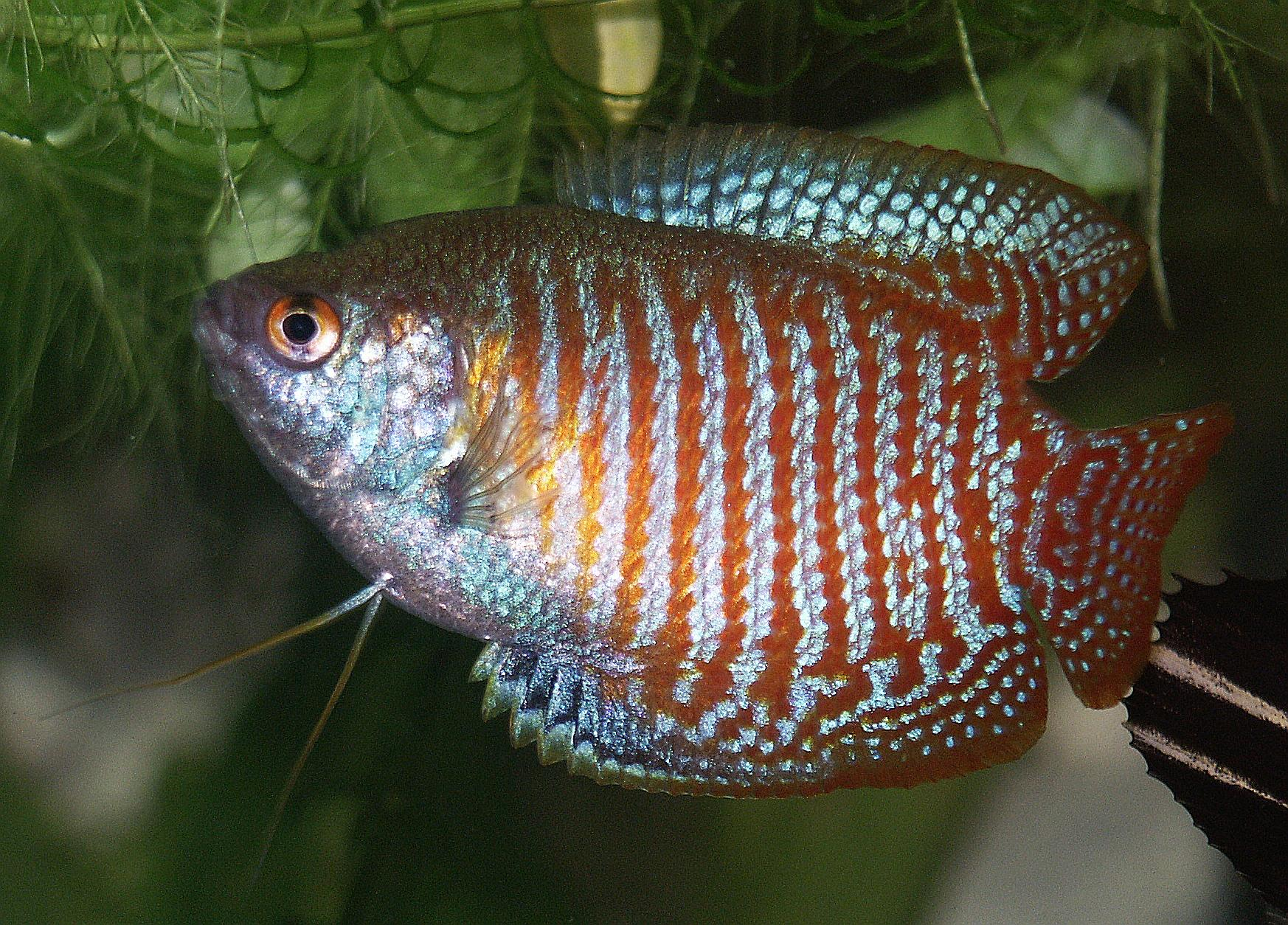
- Dwarf gourami (Trichogaster lalius)

Scientific classification
- Kingdom: Animalia
- Phylum: Chordata
- Class: Actinopterygii
- Division: Teleostei
- Order: Anabantiformes
- Suborder: Anabantoidei; Berg, 1940

Families
- Anabantidae (climbing gouramies) Bonaparte, 1831; Helostomatidae (kissing gouramies) Gill, 1872; Osphronemidae (gouramies) van der Hoeven, 1832

= Anabantoidei =

Anabantoidei Temporal range: Eocene–Recent

Suborder of fishes

The Anabantoidei are a suborder of anabantiform ray-finned freshwater fish distinguished by their possession of a lung-like labyrinth organ, which enables them to breathe air. The fish in the Anabantoidei suborder are known as anabantoids or labyrinth fish, or colloquially as gouramies (which more precisely refers to the family Osphronemidae). Some labyrinth fish are important food fish, and many others, such as the Siamese fighting fish and paradise fish, are popular as aquarium fish.

== Labyrinth organ ==
The labyrinth organ, a defining characteristic of fish in the suborder Anabantoidei, is a much-folded suprabranchial accessory breathing organ. It is formed by vascularized expansion of the epibranchial bone of the first gill arch and used for respiration in air.

This organ allows labyrinth fish to take in oxygen directly from the air, instead of taking it from the water in which they reside through use of gills. The labyrinth organ helps the inhaled oxygen to be absorbed into the bloodstream. As a result, labyrinth fish can survive for a short period of time out of water, as they can inhale the air around them, provided they stay moist.

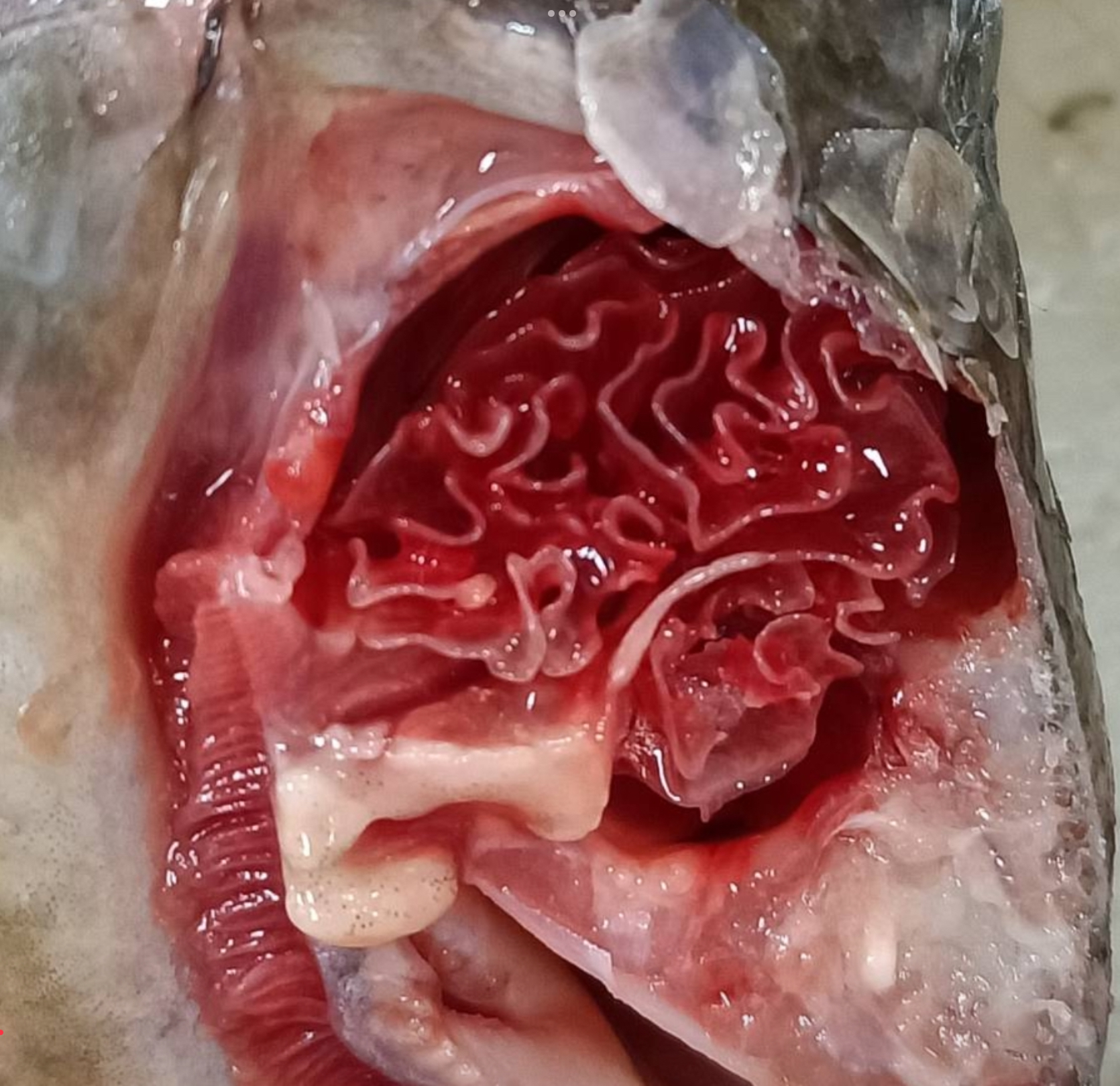
Labyrinth organ of a climbing perch (Anabas testudineus)

Labyrinth fish are not born with functional labyrinth organs. The development of the organ is gradual; most labyrinth fish initially breathe entirely with their gills, and develop the labyrinth organs as they grow older.

== Range ==
Labyrinth fish are endemic to fresh waters of Africa, East Asia, Southeast Asia, and South Asia. They are found especially but not exclusively in the warm, slow-flowing, low-oxygen waters. In Africa, significantly smaller numbers of labyrinth fish can be found in the southern half of the continent, with concentrations in the rainforest waters.

The characteristics of the fish habitats are indicators of the size of the labyrinth organ, as the organ size is negatively correlated with the level of oxygen in the waters. Species native to low-oxygen waters are more likely to have larger and more complex labyrinth organs than species found in fast-flowing, oxygen-rich waters.

== Behavior ==
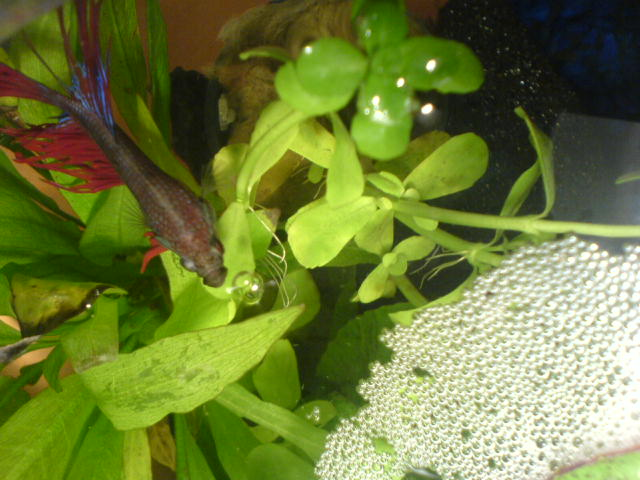
A male Siamese fighting fish, Betta splendens, is building a bubble nest.

In general, the labyrinth fish are carnivores that eat small aquatic organisms and carrion. Some species will also consume algae and water plants. Most fish are active during daytime, but several African species feed at twilight and night. Species of the genus Trichogaster can spit water toward insects to bring them down to the water surface, similarly to the archerfish.

Labyrinth fish are well known for their bubble-nesting behavior, although some species do not build bubble nests and employ other methods of brooding. For the bubble nesting species, males establish nesting territories and defend them vigorously. As the name suggests, the bubble nests are floating bubbles coated with oral mucus from the males. Typically, the male bubble nesters stay nearby to guard the nests and constantly retrieve any falling eggs and fry to the nest. Some Betta species from fast-flowing waters, however, are mouthbrooders and do not build bubble nests. In these species, males hold the eggs and fry in their mouths and release the free-swimming fry about a week to 10 days after spawning.

== Phylogeny ==
Phylogeny of families and genera in Anabatoidei based on mitochondrial DNA sequences:

- Anabantoidei
  - Anabantidae
    - Anabas
    - - Sandelia
      - - Ctenopoma
        - Microctenopoma
  - - Helostomatidae
      - Helostoma
    - Osphronemidae
      - Osphroneminae
        - Ombilinichthys
        - Osphronemus
        - Belontia
      - Luciocephalinae
        - - - Luciocephalus
            - Sphaerichthys
          - - Ctenops
            - Parasphaerichthys
        - - - Trichopodus
            - Trichogaster
          - Macropodusinae
            - Trichopsis
            - - - Macropodus
                - - Malpulutta
                  - Pseudosphromenus
              - - Betta
                - Parosphromenus

== Anabantoids as food fish ==
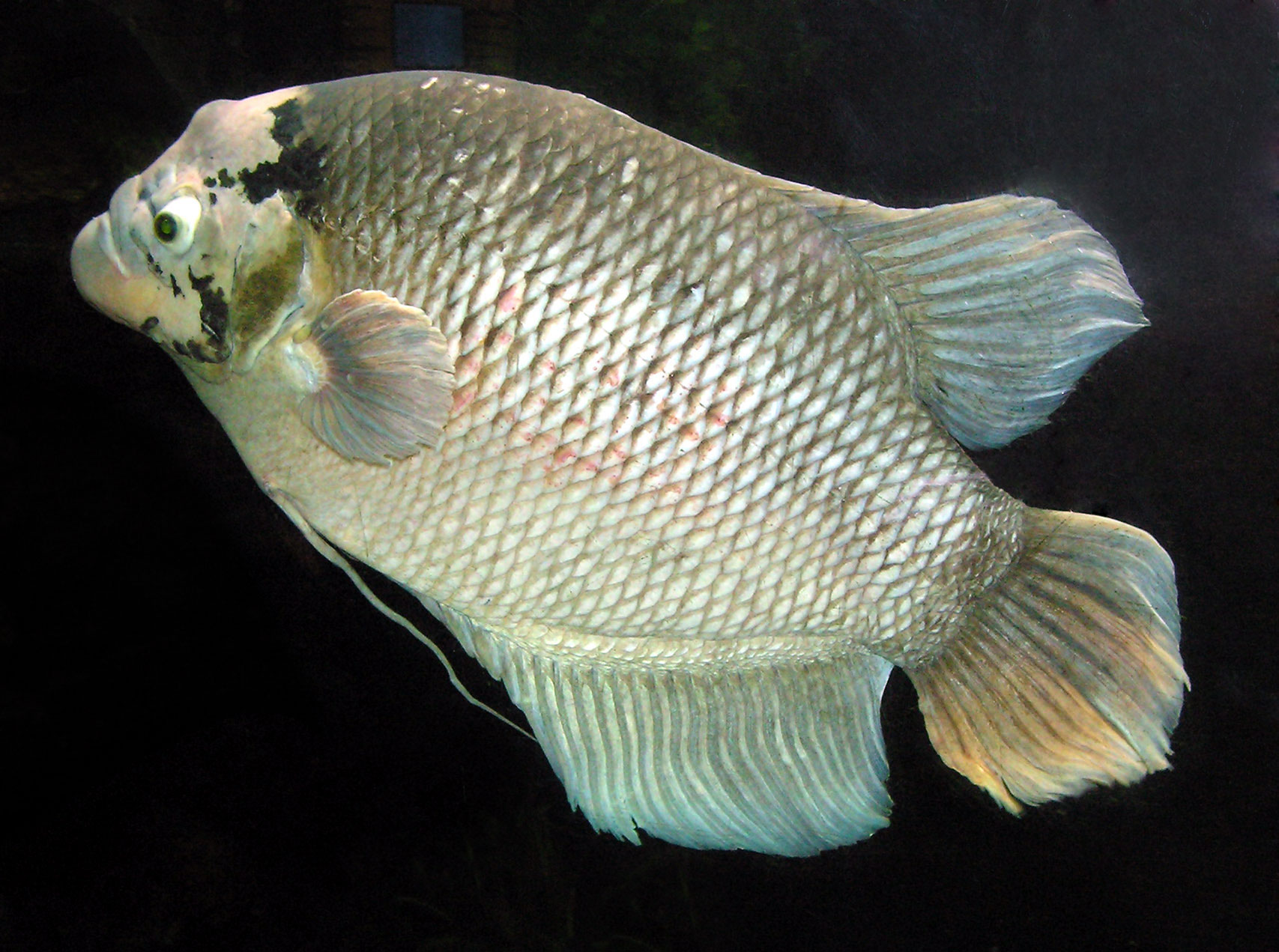
The giant gourami, Osphronemus goramy, is often raised in floating cages in central Thailand.

Several labyrinth fish are important food sources in their native countries. The giant gourami, in particular, is highly valued as food fish, due to its size and tender flesh with few spines. This species is farmed extensively in Thailand and other Southeast Asian countries, and was intentionally introduced in tropical and subtropical waters around the world. During the colonial period, the French attempted to introduce this fish to many of their territories. Although an attempt to introduce a population in southern France failed, the giant gourami became well established in other French colonies. In the late 1880s, attempts to introduce the giant gourami to California waters as food fish were unsuccessful. In the 1950s, a giant gourami population was established in Hawaii.

Other smaller labyrinth fish, such as the climbing perch, the kissing gourami, the snakeskin gourami, and other gouramies of the genus Trichogaster, are local food fish in Southeast Asia. In some areas, the fish are processed into salted and dried food.

== Anabantoids as aquarium fish ==
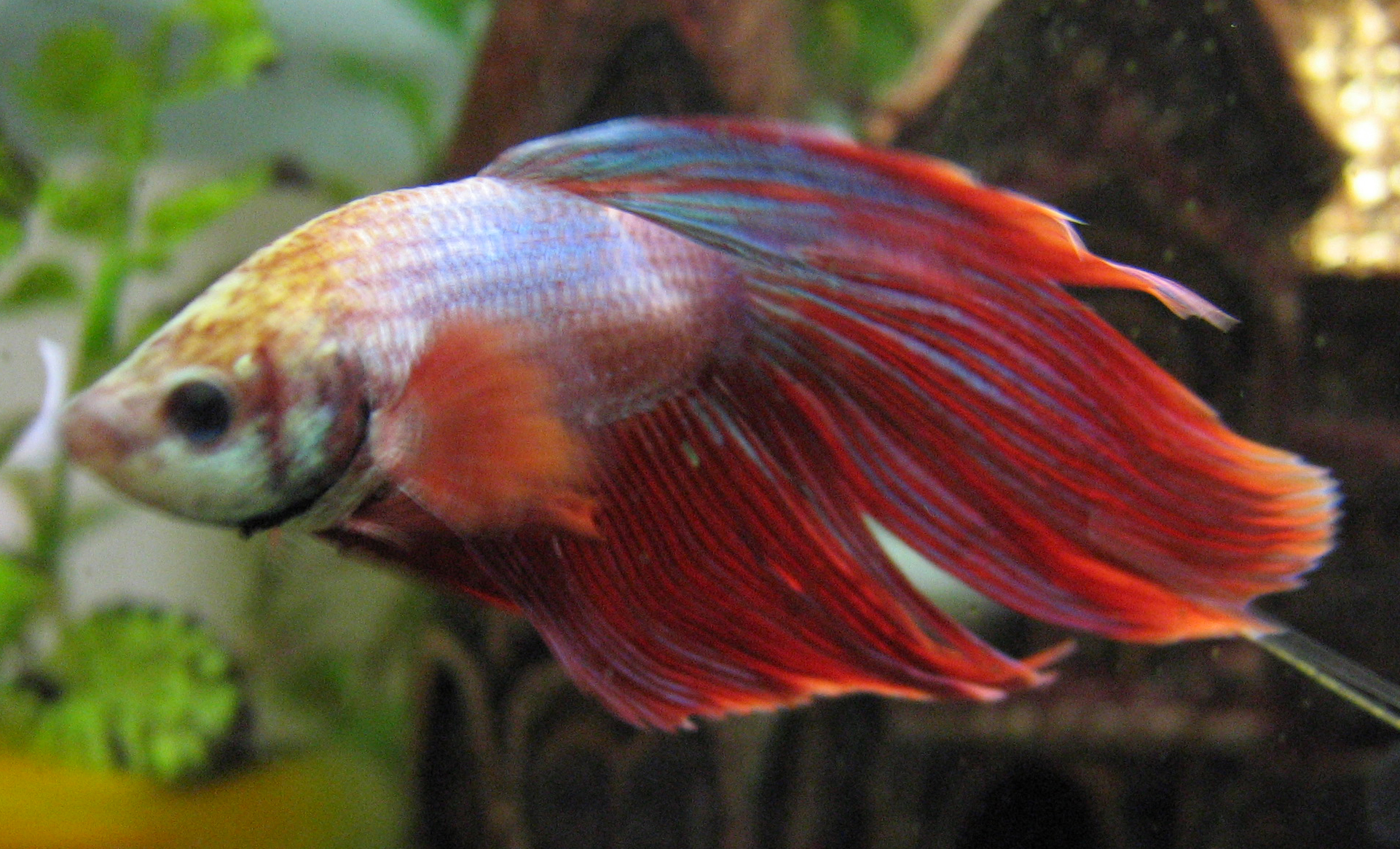
The Siamese fighting fish, Betta splendens, originally bred for staged fights, has become popular in the aquarium trade

The Siamese fighting fish is perhaps the most popular labyrinth fish in the aquarium trade. The paradise fish also has a long aquarium history and was one of the first aquarium fish introduced to the West. Many species of gouramies, particular the three spot gourami and the dwarf gourami, are commercially bred for the trade, and several color morphs are commonly available. Because of their capability to use atmospheric oxygen, these fish generally are not so dependent on a form of aeration in their tanks, as they can rise to the surface of the water and take a breath, or breathing apparatus. Many of the labyrinth fish are peaceful and do well in most community tanks. However, individual males, especially the Siamese fighting fish and paradise fish, are territorial towards each other. Male Siamese fighting fish cannot be kept together under any circumstances, as they have been bred for aggression and will fight to the death. In many breeding pairs, the male and female cannot be kept together for long periods of time. Males may perceive males of other species as competition if they have long and bright fins and attack them, as well. For other species of anabantoids, a large aquarium with only one male per tank is ideal to prevent aggression.
