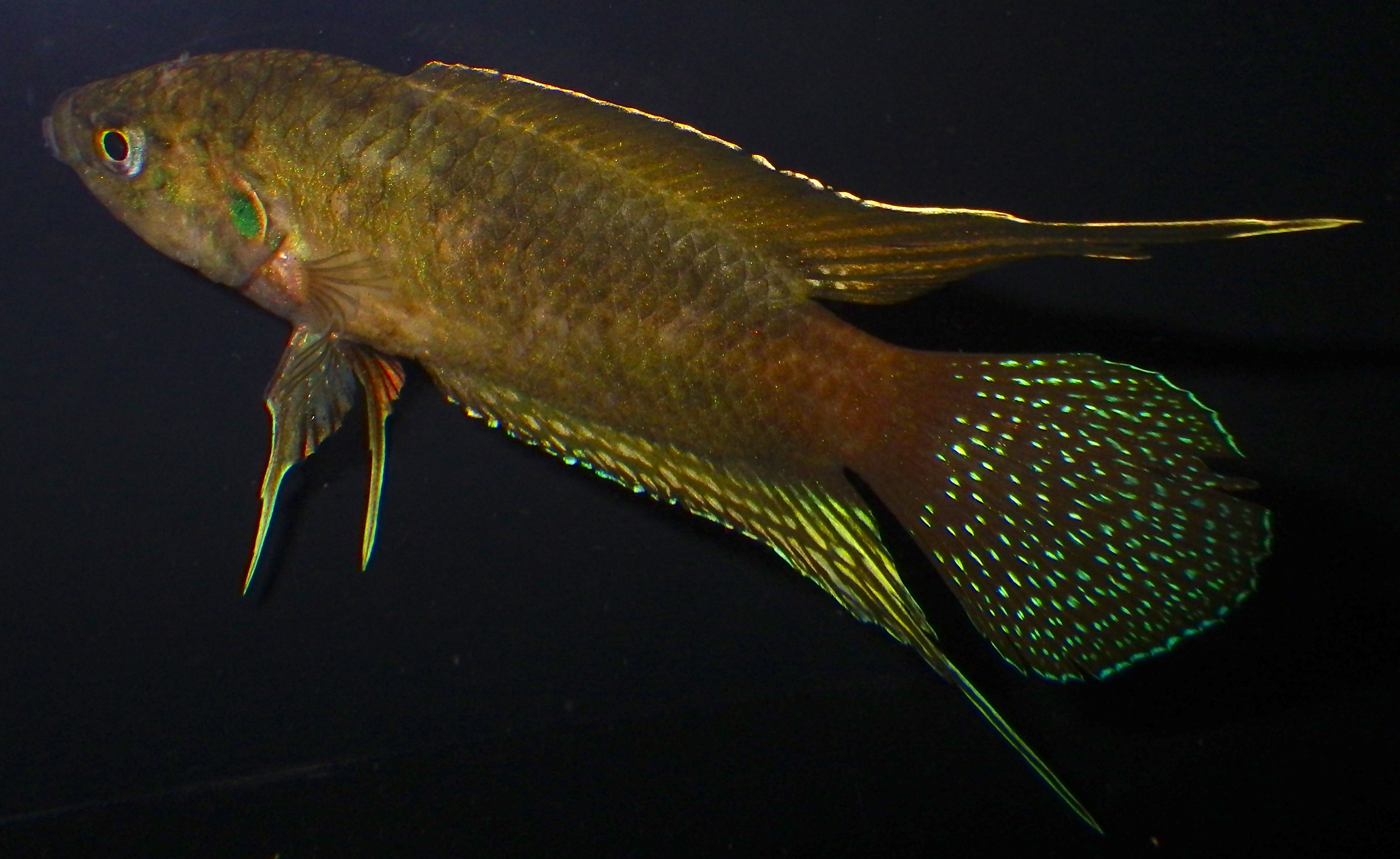
- Immature male

Scientific classification
- Kingdom: Animalia
- Phylum: Chordata
- Class: Actinopterygii
- Order: Anabantiformes
- Family: Osphronemidae
- Genus: Macropodus
- Species: M. ocellatus

Binomial name
- Macropodus ocellatus Cantor, 1842
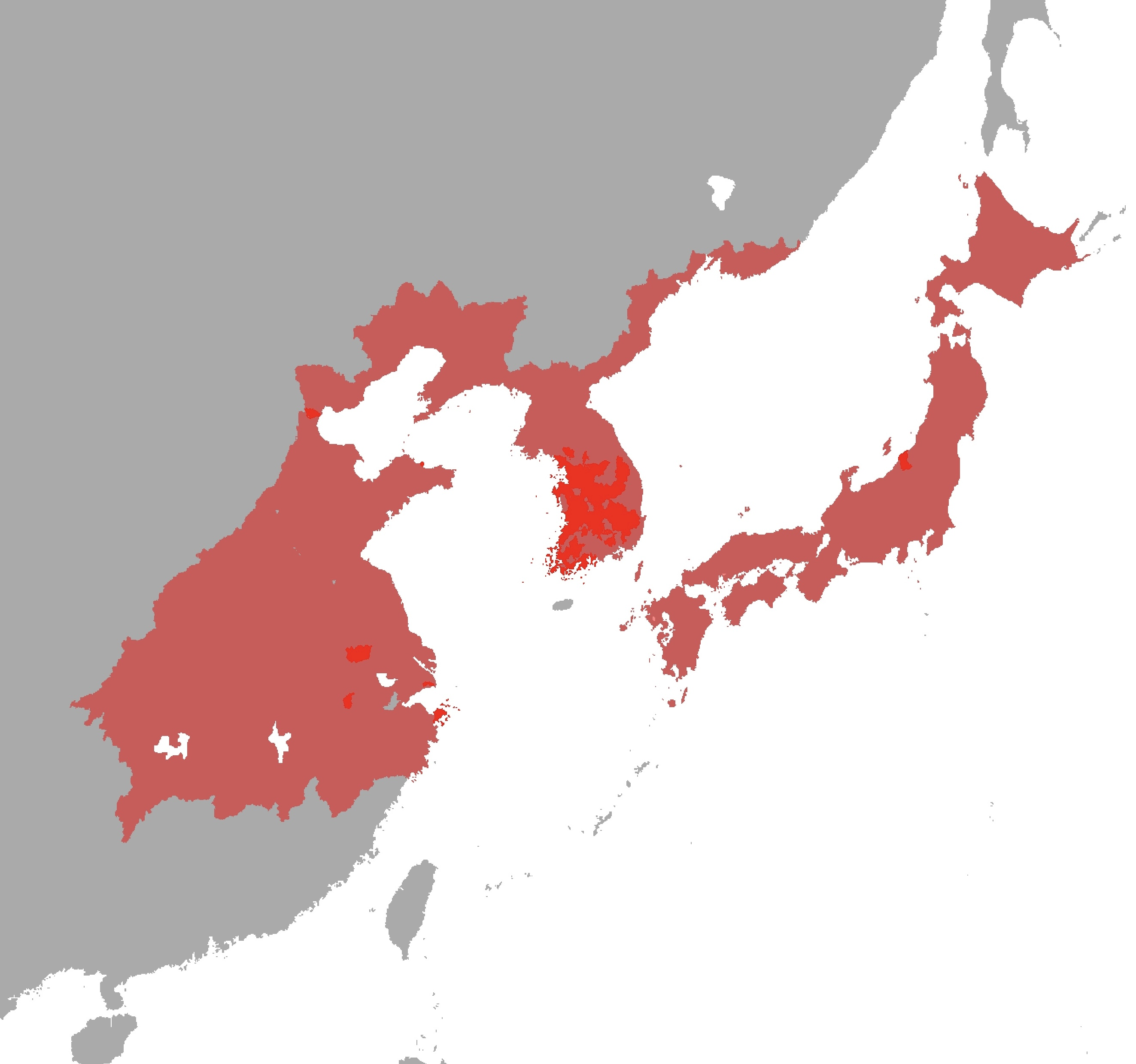

Synonyms
- Polyacanthus paludosus Richardson, 1846

= Round-tailed paradise fish =

Species of fish

The round-tailed paradise fish (Macropodus ocellatus) is a species of gourami native to eastern Asia, where it is found in Korea and China. It is also found in Japan but it is believed that they were introduced from Korea in the 1910s. It is also known to occur in the Amur Basin of Russia, but that is believed to be due to introductions. It inhabits many kinds of freshwater habitats within its range. This species is reported to be well adapted to cold weather during winter in its relatively northern range, even to the point of remaining active when their body of water is covered with ice. This species grows to a standard length of 6.2 cm (2.4 in), and can be found in the aquarium trade.

== Morphology ==
The species has a total length of 5–8 cm, making it smaller than the paradise fish (Macropodus opercularis) and the black paradise fish (Macropodus spechti).
