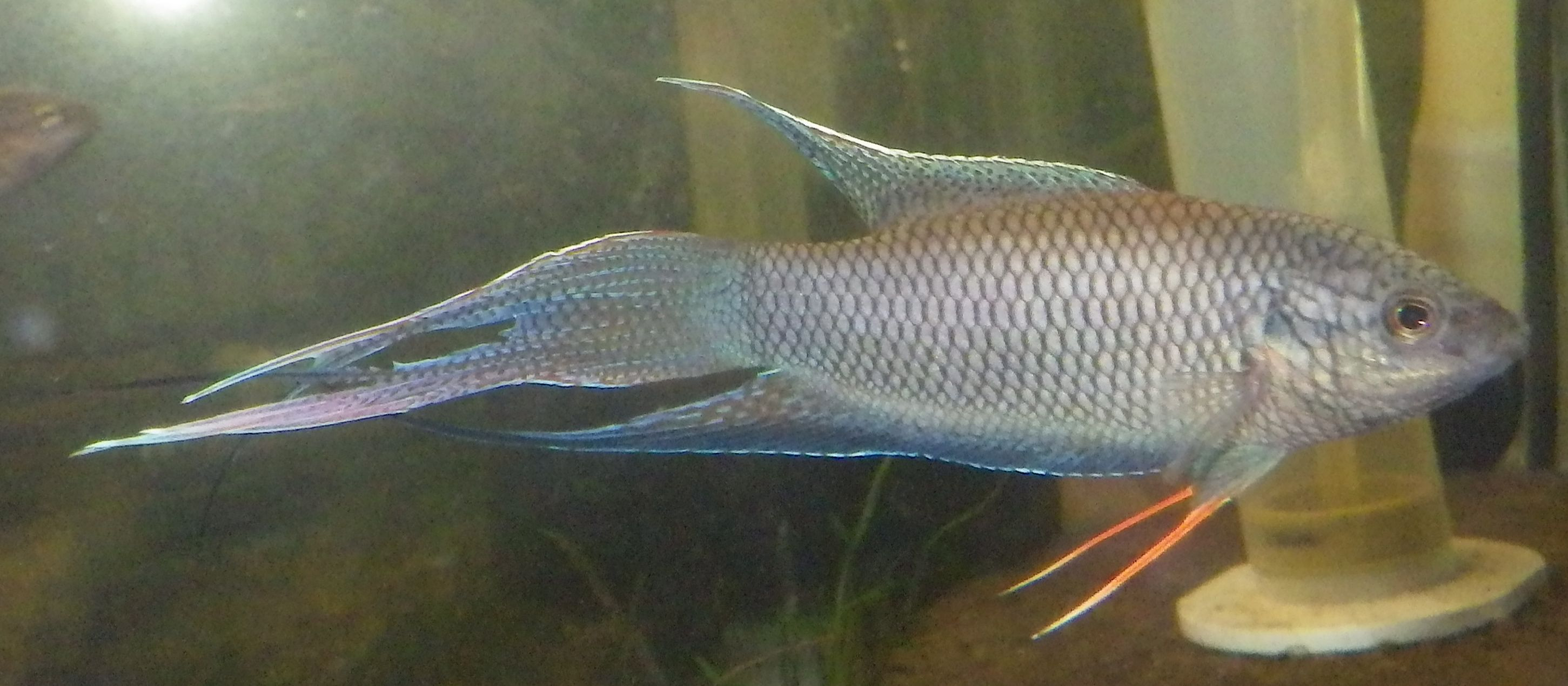

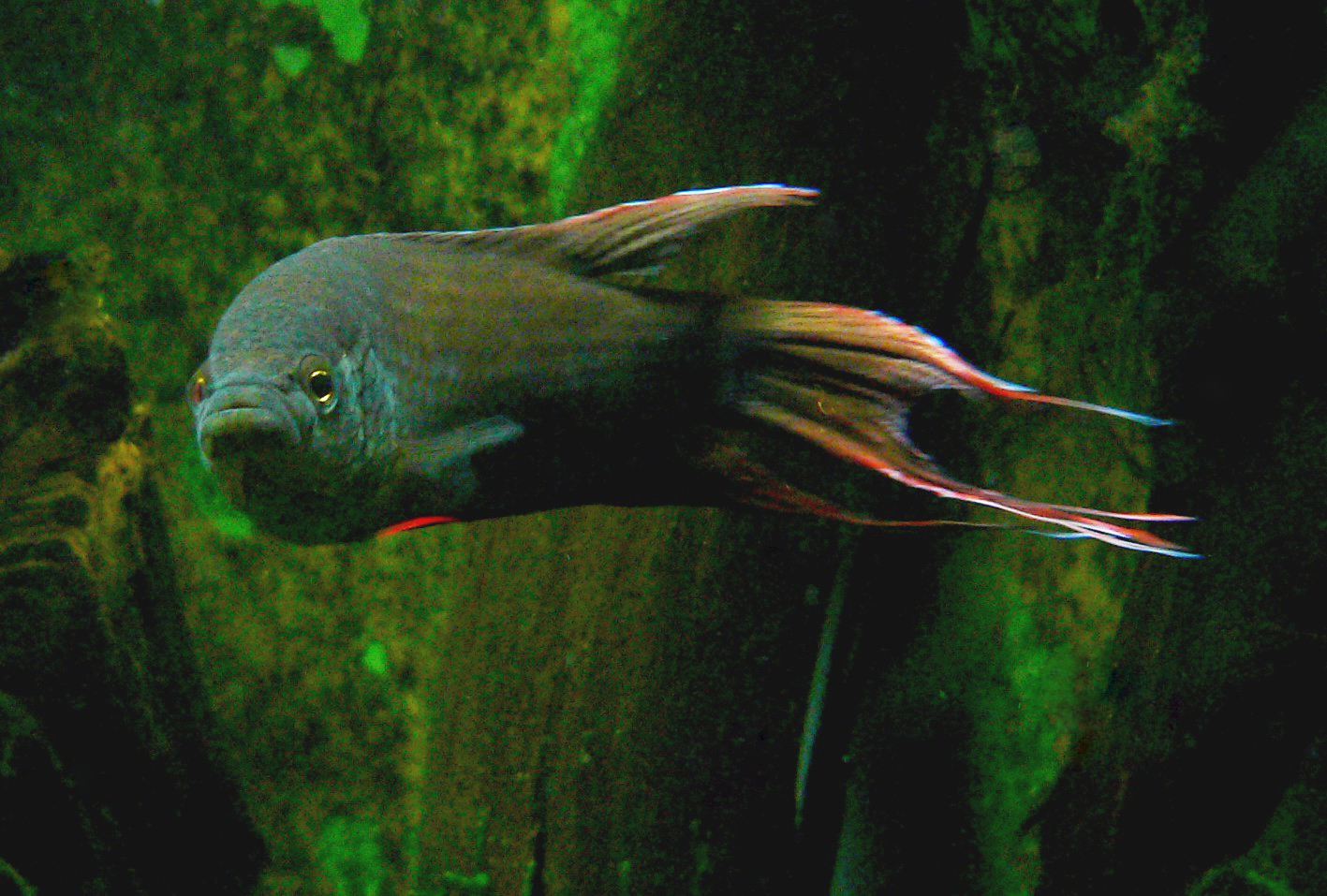
- Males

Conservation status
- Data Deficient (IUCN 3.1)

Scientific classification
- Kingdom: Animalia
- Phylum: Chordata
- Class: Actinopterygii
- Order: Anabantiformes
- Family: Osphronemidae
- Genus: Macropodus
- Species: M. erythropterus

Binomial name
- Macropodus erythropterus Freyhof & Herder, 2002
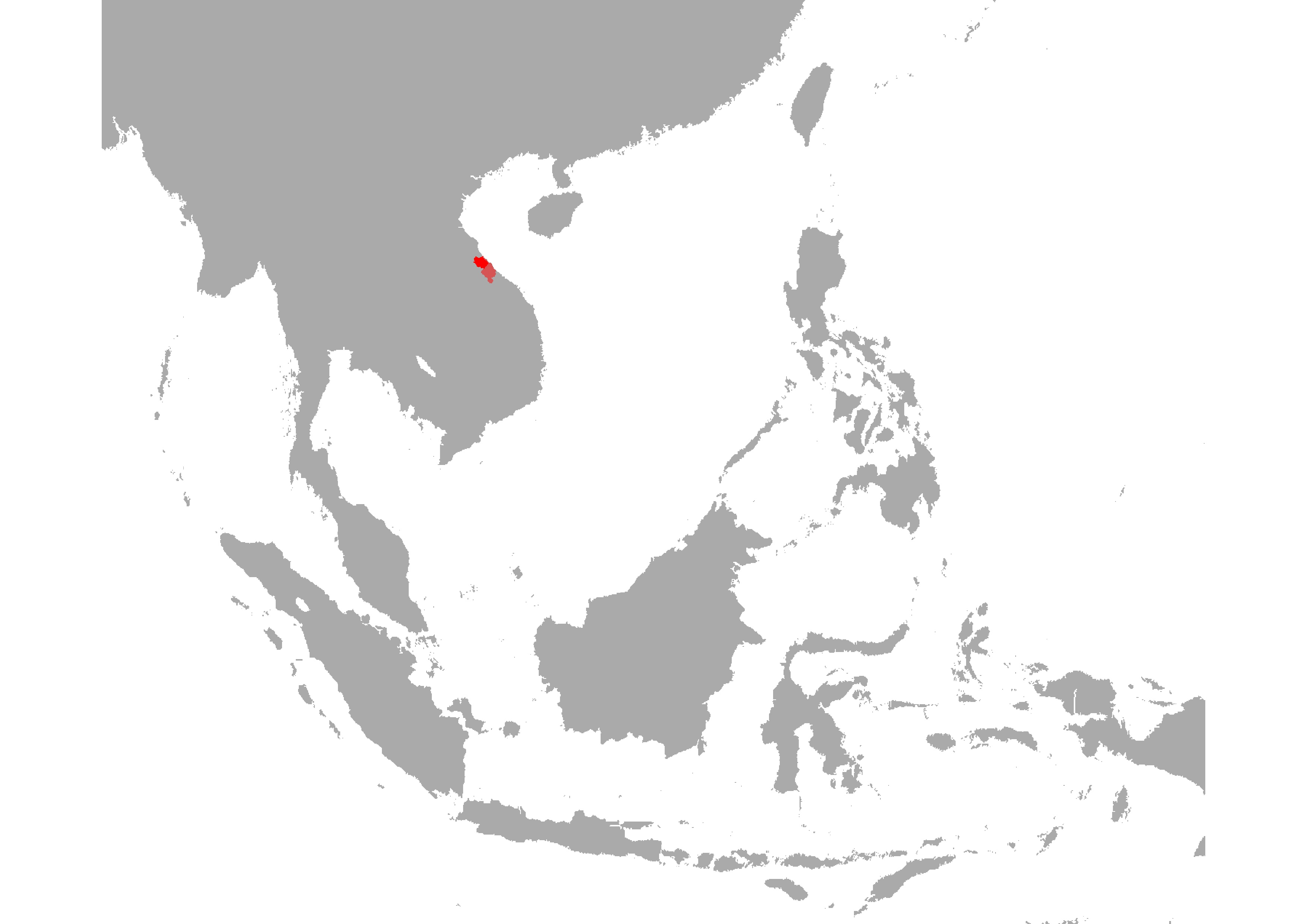

= Red-backed paradise fish =

Species of fish

The red-backed paradise fish (Macropodus erythropterus) is a species of gourami endemic to streams in Vietnam. This species grows to a standard length of 6.5 cm (2.6 in), and it is sometimes seen in the aquarium trade.

== Range and habitat ==
The red-backed paradise fish is endemic to central Vietnam, where only known from the Quang Tri River, a part of the Giang River basin. Here it inhabits hill streams in areas with submerged roots and overhanging vegetation.

== Taxonomy ==
This species cannot be reliably separated from M. hongkongensis, M. opercularis and M. spechti by meristics and morphometrics. It differs from the first two in colouration, but the validity of the generally recognised colour differences between M. erythropterus and M. spechti (the latter lacking red in the dorsal, anal and tail fins) is questionable and a review of specimens in 2008 found that it was not reliable. As a consequence, some authorities have recommended considering M. erythropterus as a junior synonym of M. spechti. The 2008 study did not include specimens from the type locality of M. erythropterus, leading others to reject the results and continue to recognise it as a valid species, although noting the need for further studies. According to the IUCN, the validity of M. erythropterus as a species require confirmation.
