= Macropodus phongnhaensis =

Scientific classification
- Kingdom: Animalia
- Phylum: Chordata
- Class: Actinopterygii
- Order: Anabantiformes
- Family: Osphronemidae
- Genus: Macropodus
- Species: M. phongnhaensis

Binomial name
- Macropodus phongnhaensis Ngô, Nguyen & Nguyen, 2005

Species of fish

Macropodus phongnhaensis is a species of gourami. It is native to Asia, where it is known only from freshwater habitats in Vietnam. The species is known to be an obligate air-breather.
