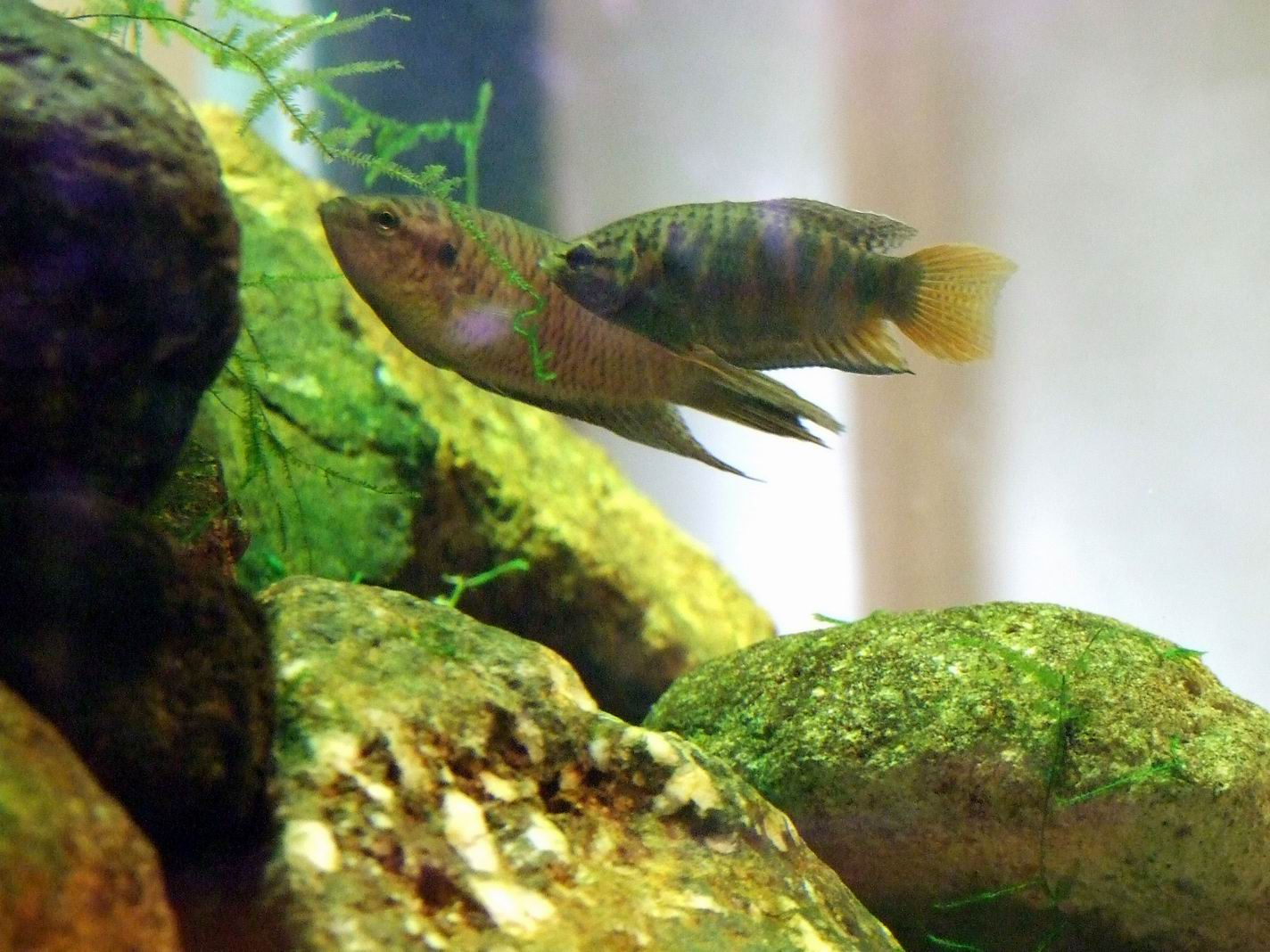

Scientific classification
- Kingdom: Animalia
- Phylum: Chordata
- Class: Actinopterygii
- Order: Anabantiformes
- Family: Osphronemidae
- Genus: Macropodus
- Species: M. hongkongensis

Binomial name
- Macropodus hongkongensis Freyhof & Herder, 2002

= Macropodus hongkongensis =

Species of fish

Macropodus hongkongensis is a species of paradise fish (Macropodus) endemic to southern China. This species was first discovered in Hong Kong, but later was found in other areas of southern China. It is found in mountainous regions as well as lowland habitats. This species grows to a length of more than 10 cm.

Like other Macropodus, M. hongkongensis is popular among Chinese fish keepers and is called "Hong Kong black paradise fish (Traditional Chinese:香港黑叉尾鬥魚 or HK黑). This fish is easy to keep and breed in aquariums but has a reputation for being unusually aggressive.
