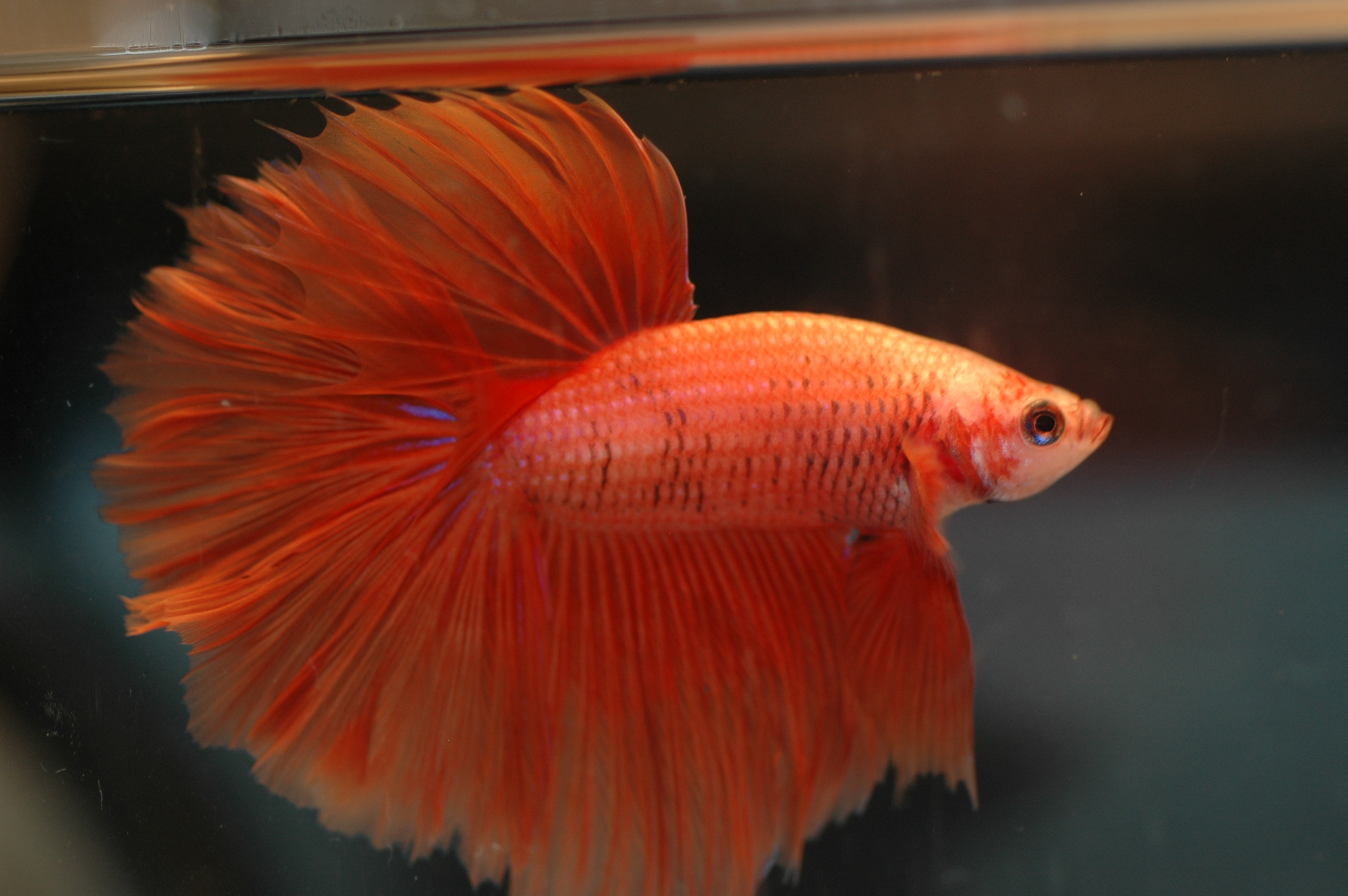
- Siamese fighting fish (Betta splendens)

Scientific classification
- Kingdom: Animalia
- Phylum: Chordata
- Class: Actinopterygii
- Division: Teleostei
- Order: Anabantiformes
- Family: Osphronemidae
- Subfamily: Macropodusinae; Hoedeman, 1948

Genera
- See text

Synonyms
- Macropodinae Hoedeman, 1948

= Macropodusinae =

Subfamily of fishes

The Macropodusinae are a subfamily of freshwater anabantiform fishes in the gourami family Osphronemidae, which includes the paradisefish, fighting fish and licorice gouramis. Like all members of the family, these are air breathing fishes that frequently inhabit oxygen poor environments hostile to other fishes (the licorice gouramies of Parosphromenus inhabit well-oxygenated, but extremely soft and acidic, blackwater streams). They are native to Asia, from Pakistan and India to the Malay Archipelago and north-easterly towards Korea. Many members are common aquarium fish; by far the most famous is the Siamese fighting fish, Betta splendens (note that the domesticated form is very likely a hybrid). Most (not all) of the 70+ betta species are paternal mouthbrooders; the remaining members of the subfamily are bubblenesters like most osphronemids.

The subfamily was originally named Macropodinae but this name was adjudged to be a junior homonym of the mammalian family Macropodidae, the kangaroos and wallabies, and the name was changed by ICZN Opinion 2058 to Macropodusinae.

== Genera ==
The following genera are classified in this subfamily. Betta is by far the largest genus with over 70 species (more than the rest of the subfamily combined and easily the largest osphronemid genus), followed by Parosphromenus (which, with at least 20 species, is the next most speciose osphronemid genus).

- Betta Bleeker 1849
- Macropodus Lacépède, 1801
- Malpulutta Deraniyagala, 1937
- Parosphromenus Bleeker, 1877
- Pseudosphromenus Bleeker, 1879
- Trichopsis Canestrini, 1860

== Gallery ==
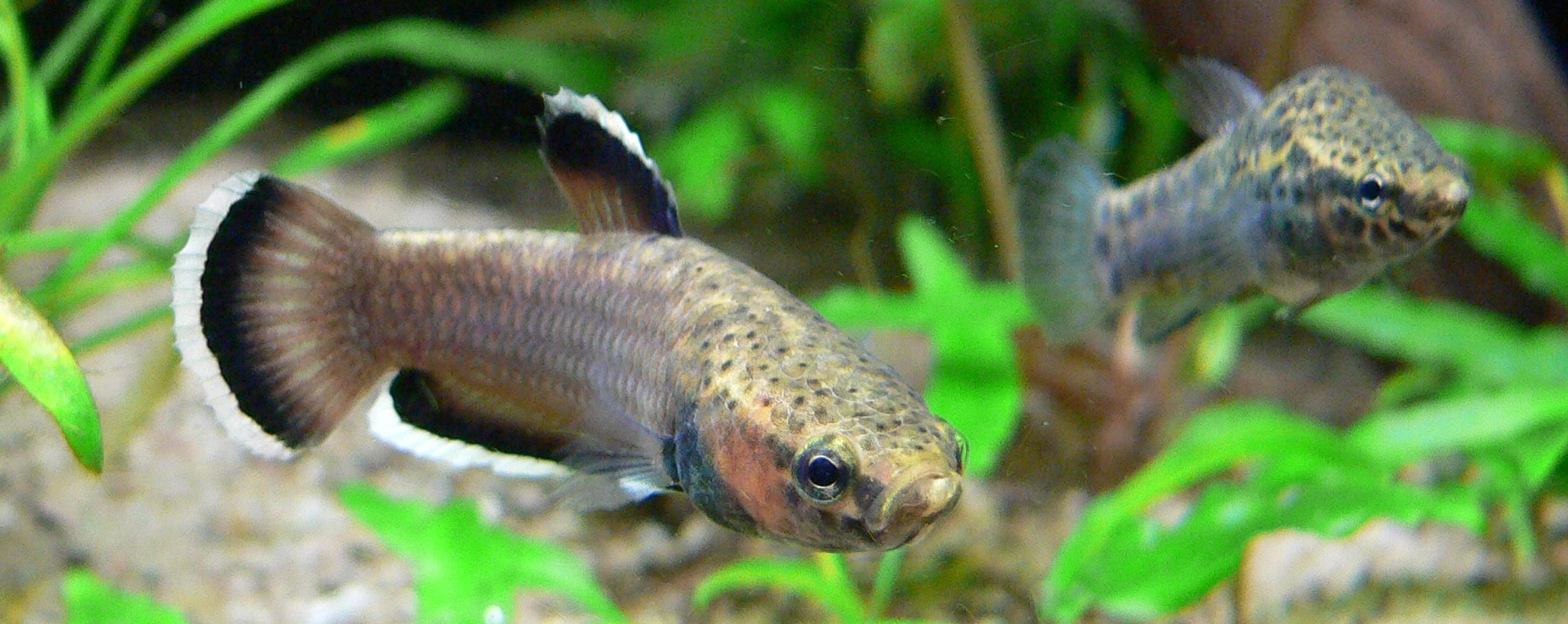
Betta albimarginata

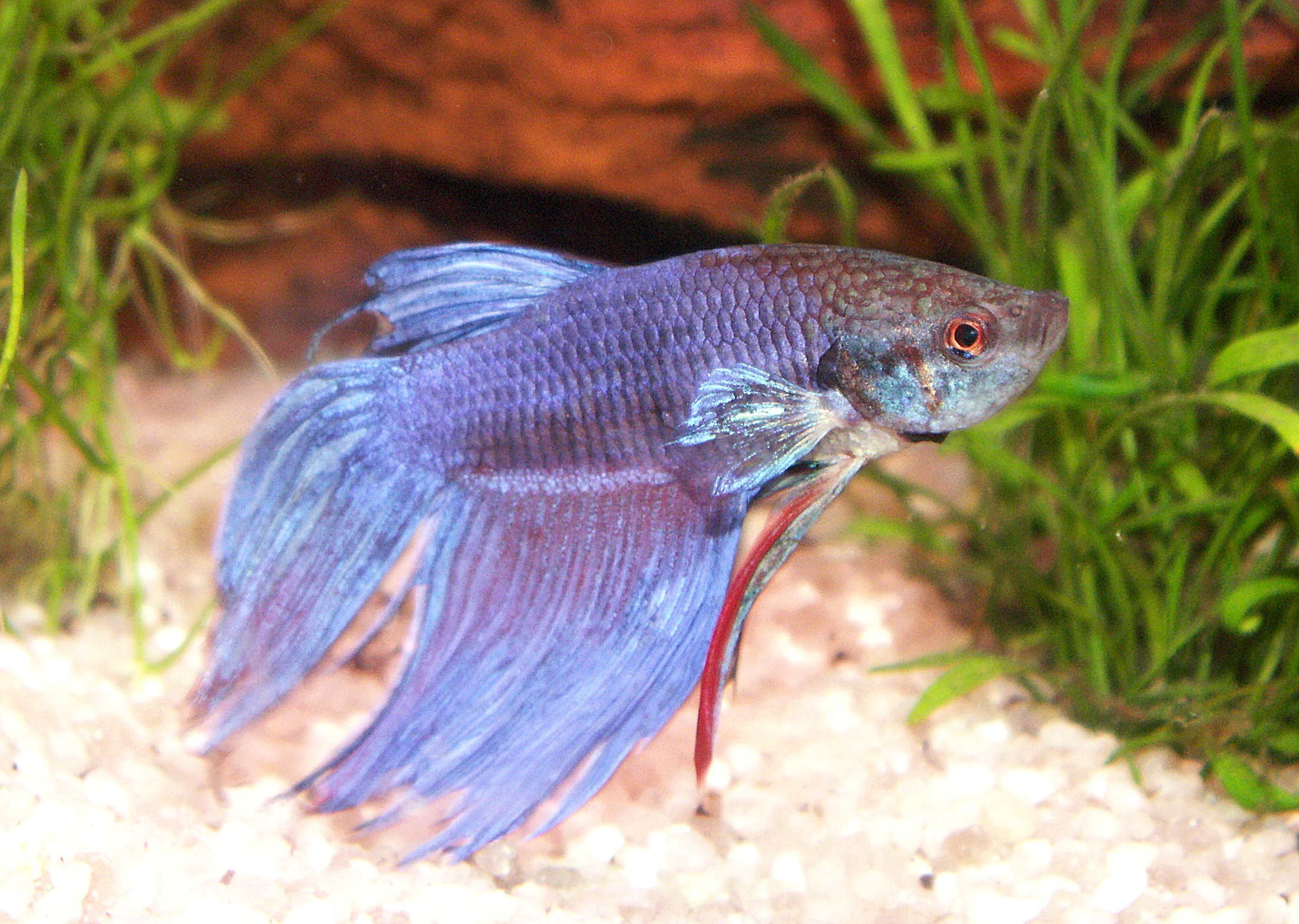
Siamese fighting fish (Betta splendens)

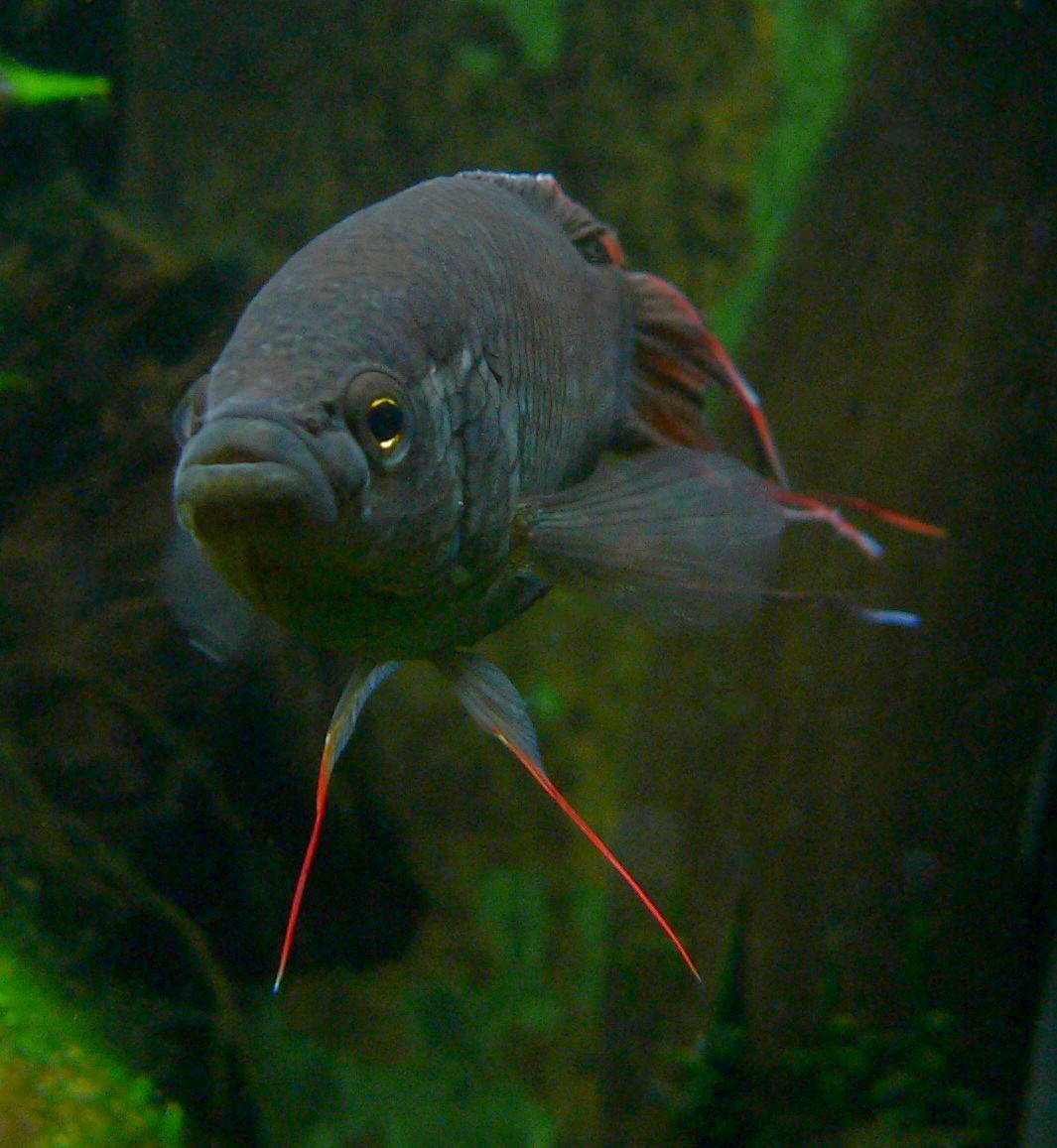
Red-backed paradise fish

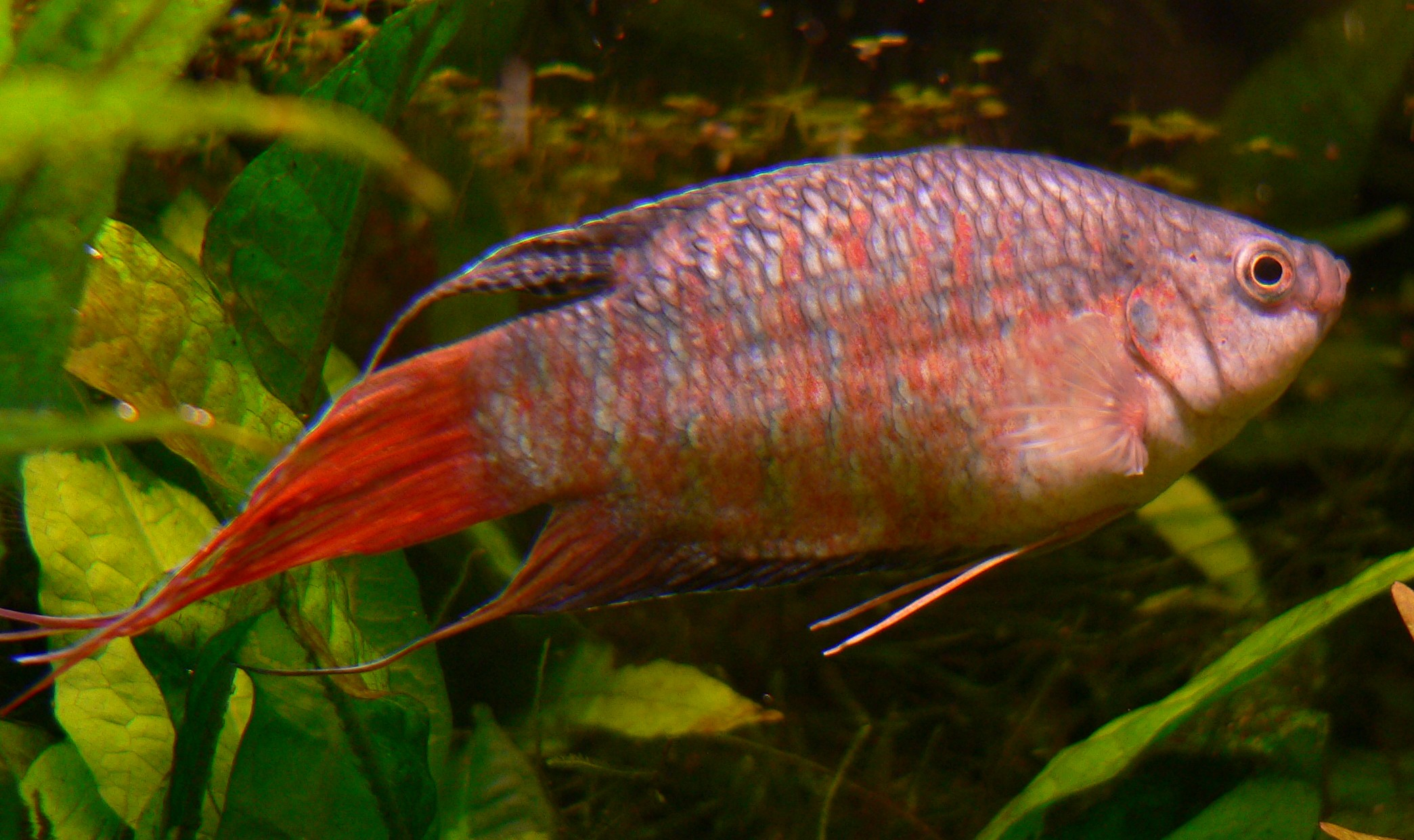
Paradise fish (Macropodus opercularis)
