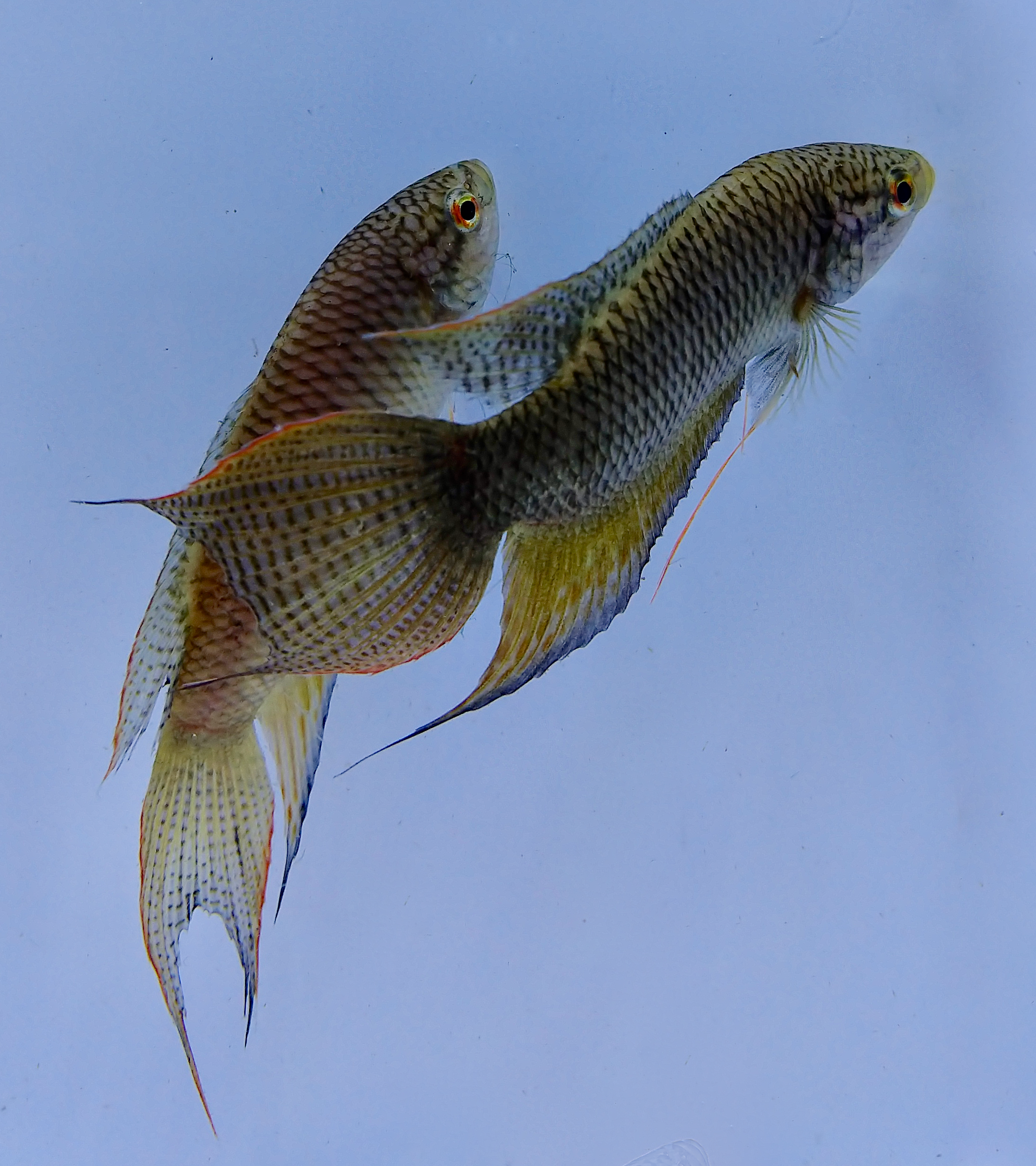

Conservation status
- Data Deficient (IUCN 3.1)

Scientific classification
- Kingdom: Animalia
- Phylum: Chordata
- Class: Actinopterygii
- Order: Anabantiformes
- Family: Osphronemidae
- Genus: Macropodus
- Species: M. spechti

Binomial name
- Macropodus spechti Schreitmüller, 1936
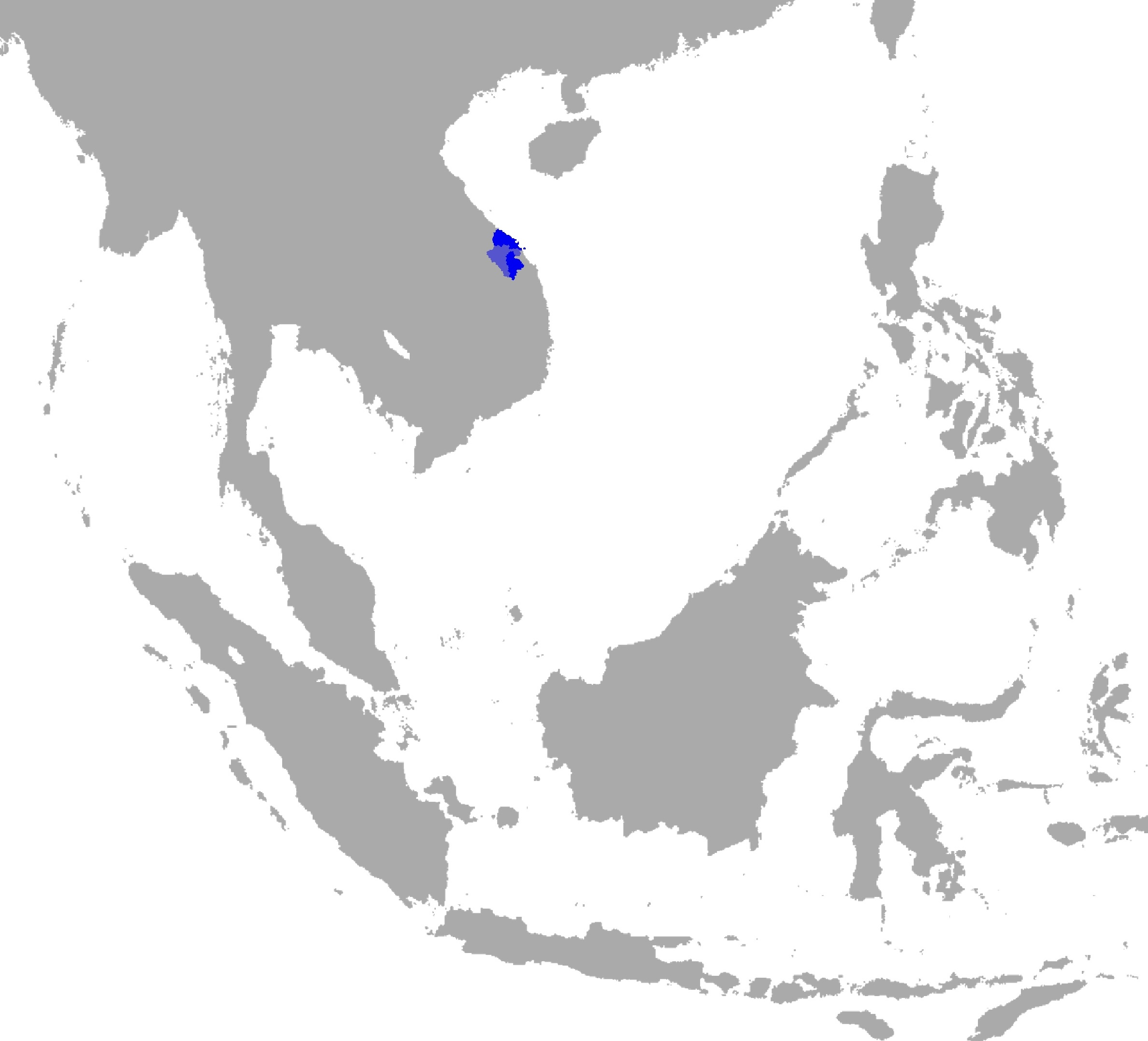

Synonyms
- Macropodus opercularis spechti Schreitmüller, 1936; Macropodus opercularis concolor Ahl, 1936; Macropodus concolor Ahl, 1936

= Black paradisefish =

Species of fish

The black paradisefish (Macropodus spechti) is a species of gourami endemic to Vietnam. It is an inhabitant of hill streams, lowland streams, and irrigation ditches in farmland. This species grows to a standard length of 5.8 cm (2.3 in). It is found in the Thu Bon River and Perfume River; its habitat is hill streams, along backwaters of large rivers and small stream and irrigation channels on farmland. Aside from possibly being used as an ornamental fish, nothing else is known about the species.
