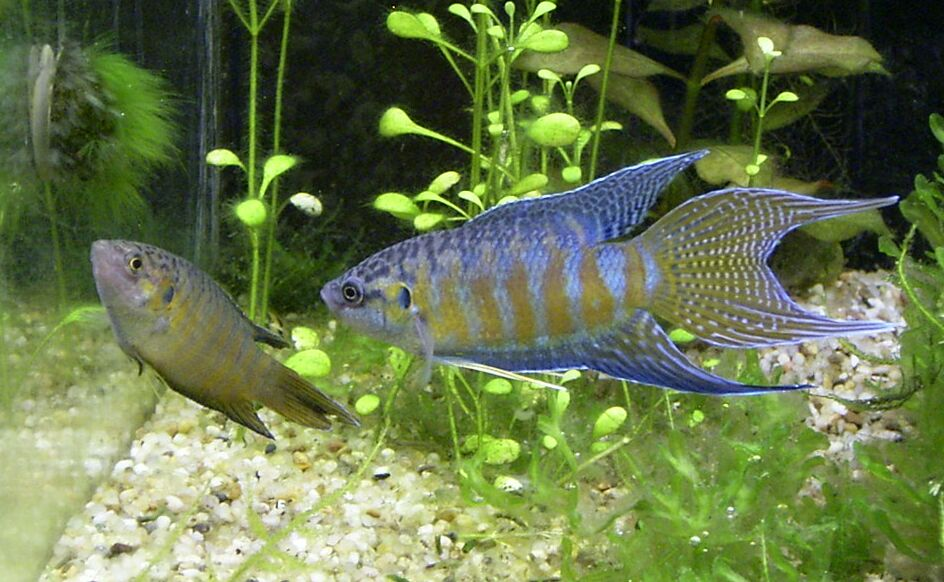
- A pair of Macropodus opercularis

Scientific classification
- Domain: Eukaryota
- Kingdom: Animalia
- Phylum: Chordata
- Class: Actinopterygii
- Order: Anabantiformes
- Family: Osphronemidae
- Subfamily: Macropodusinae
- Genus: Macropodus; Lacépède, 1801

Type species
- Macropodus viridiauratus Lacépède, 1801

Synonyms
- Pseudobetta Richter, 1981; Pedites Gistel, 1848

= Macropodus =

Genus of fishes

Macropodus is a genus of small to medium-sized labyrinth fish native to freshwater habitats in eastern Asia. Most species are restricted to southern China (including Hong Kong and Taiwan) and Vietnam, but M. opercularis occurs as far north as the Yangtze basin, and M. ocellatus occurs north to the Amur River, as well as in Japan and Korea. In China, they are often used for fights, so they are named Chinese bettas because of their similarity to the genus Betta. A few species in the genus are regularly seen in the aquarium trade, and M. opercularis has been introduced to regions far outside its native range.

== Species ==
As of 2014, the recognized species in this genus are:

- Macropodus baviensis H. D. Nguyễn & V. H. Nguyễn, 2005
- Macropodus erythropterus Freyhof & Herder, 2002 (Red-backed paradisefish)
- Macropodus hongkongensis Freyhof & Herder, 2002
- Macropodus lineatus V. H. Nguyễn, S. V. Ngô & H. D. Nguyễn, 2005
- Macropodus ocellatus Cantor, 1842 (Round-tailed paradisefish)
- Macropodus oligolepis V. H. Nguyễn, S. V. Ngô & H. D. Nguyễn, 2005
- Macropodus opercularis (Linnaeus, 1758) (Paradise fish)
- Macropodus phongnhaensis S. V. Ngô, V. H. Nguyễn & H. D. Nguyễn, 2005
- Macropodus spechti Schreitmüller, 1936 (Black paradisefish)
