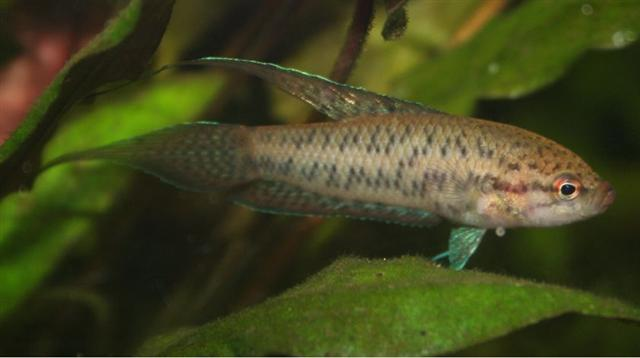

Conservation status
- Endangered (IUCN 3.1)

Scientific classification
- Kingdom: Animalia
- Phylum: Chordata
- Class: Actinopterygii
- Order: Anabantiformes
- Family: Osphronemidae
- Subfamily: Macropodusinae
- Genus: Malpulutta; Deraniyagala, 1937
- Species: M. kretseri

Binomial name
- Malpulutta kretseri Deraniyagala, 1937
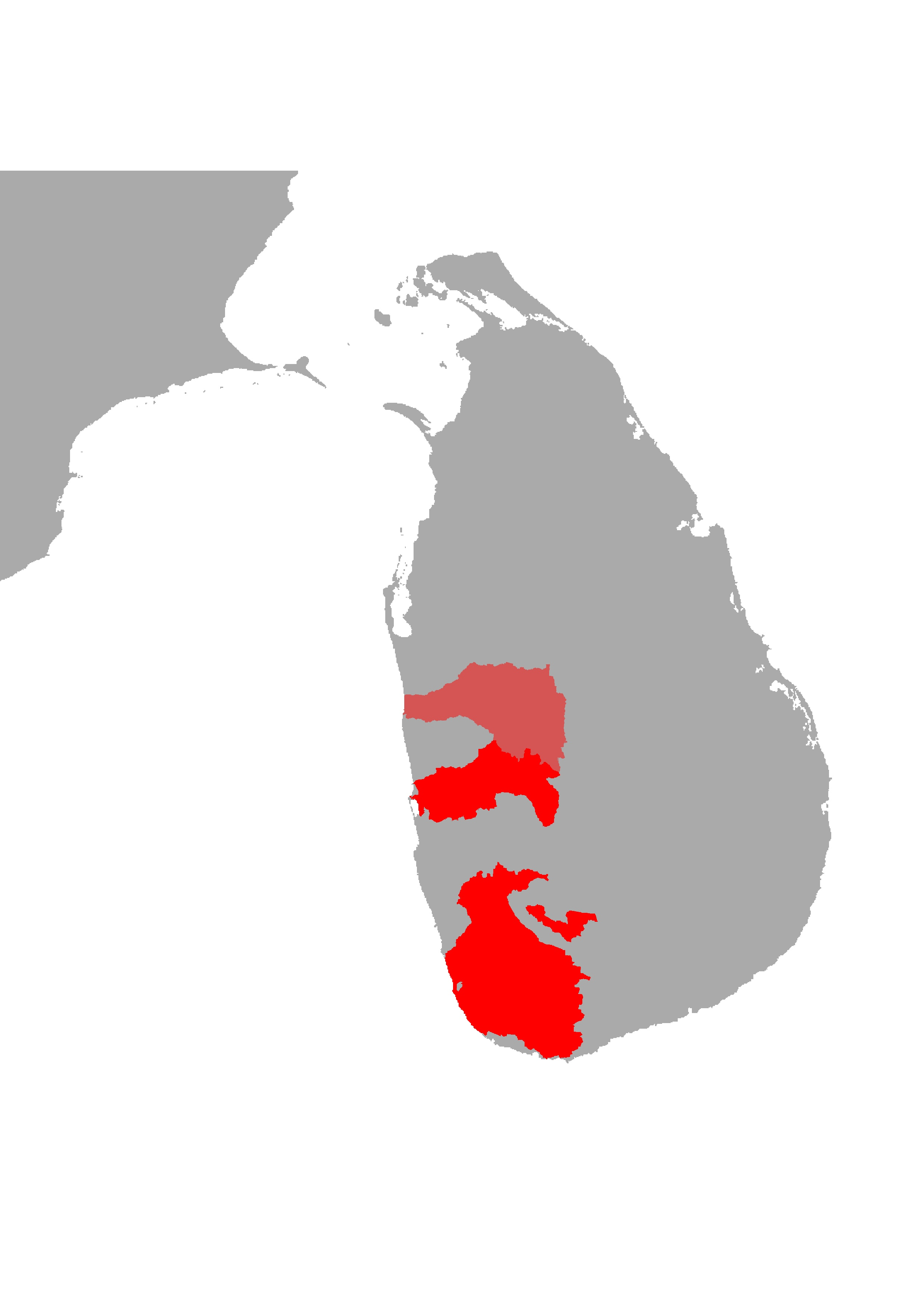
- Red:present, Light red:possibly extinct

= Ornate paradisefish =

Species of fish

The ornate paradisefish (Malpulutta kretseri) or spotted gourami, is a species of gourami endemic to Sri Lanka. It is the only recognized species in its genus.

It inhabits shallow, slow-flowing streams in forested areas shaded with plentiful vegetation near the edges and a substrate covered by leaf litter. It is a carnivore, preying on plankton, fish fry, and the larvae of insects. They can reach a length of 4 cm (1.6 in), though most are only around 2 cm (0.79 in). This species can also occasionally be found in the aquarium trade, where it is reportedly exceedingly shy. The specific name of this fish honours the Sri Lankan lawyer and judge Oswald Leslie De Kretser II.
