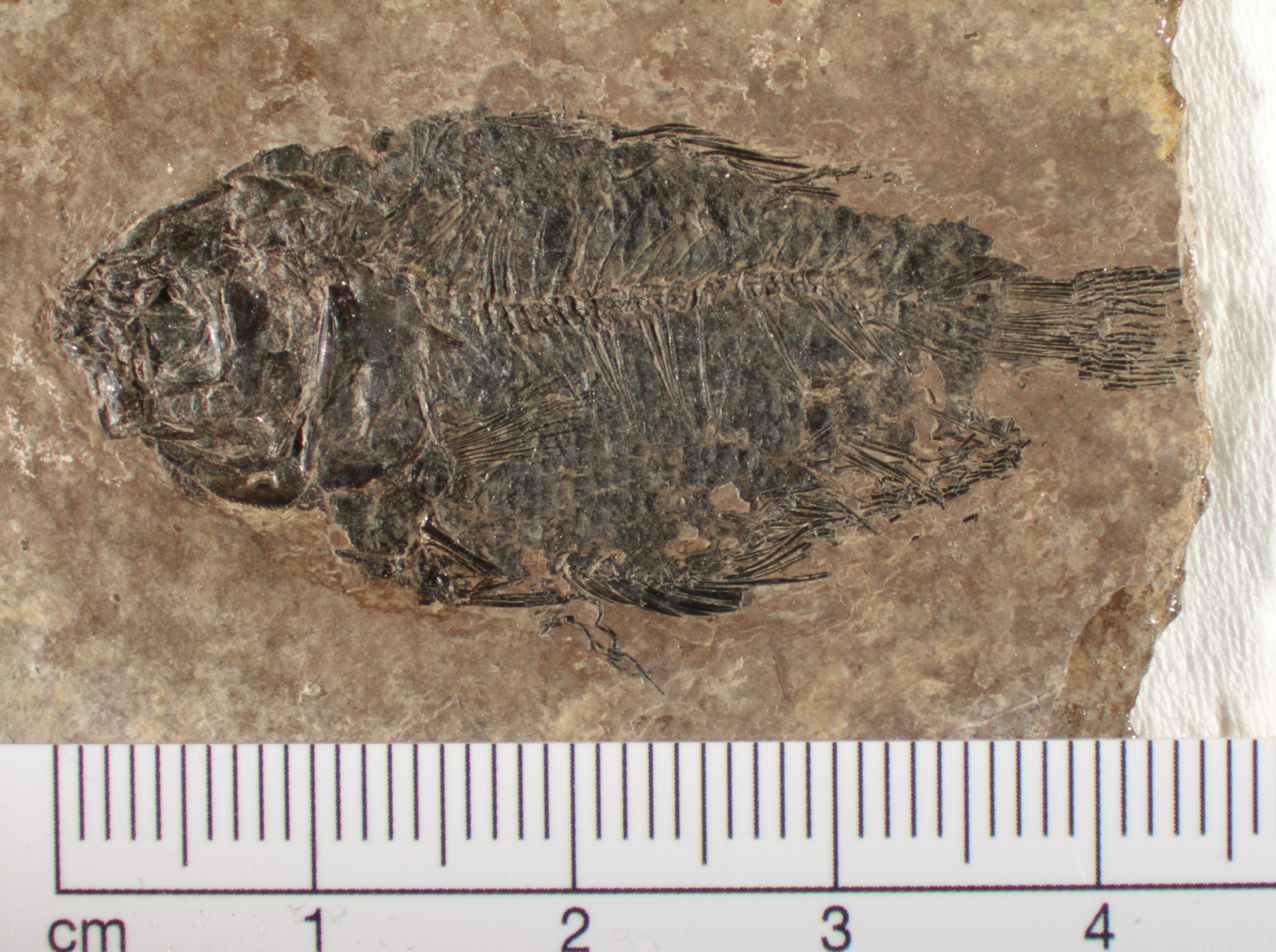
- The only known Ombilinichthys yamini

Scientific classification
- Kingdom: Animalia
- Phylum: Chordata
- Class: Actinopterygii
- Order: Anabantiformes
- Family: Osphronemidae
- Genus: †Ombilinichthys; Murray et al., 2015a

Species
- †Ombilinichthys yamini

= Ombilinichthys =

Ombilinichthys Temporal range: Eocene

Prehistoric genus of fishes

Ombilinichthys is an extinct genus of gourami from the Ombilin Basin in Sumatra. It's single specimen was discovered among fossils collected in 2009 from the lacustrine Sangkarewang Formation and described in 2015. It is the earliest known gourami, dated uncertainly to the Eocene. It contains a single species, Ombilinichthys yamini, named for Indonesian poet and revolutionary Mohammad Yamin, who was born in the same town where Ombilinichthys yamini was discovered. It is a small and deep fish, with the holotype's body being 37 mm long and 18 mm deep. Its skull is also deep at 15 mm. The preserved part showed that it have 29-30 scales laterally. It is closely related to the genus Osphronemus.

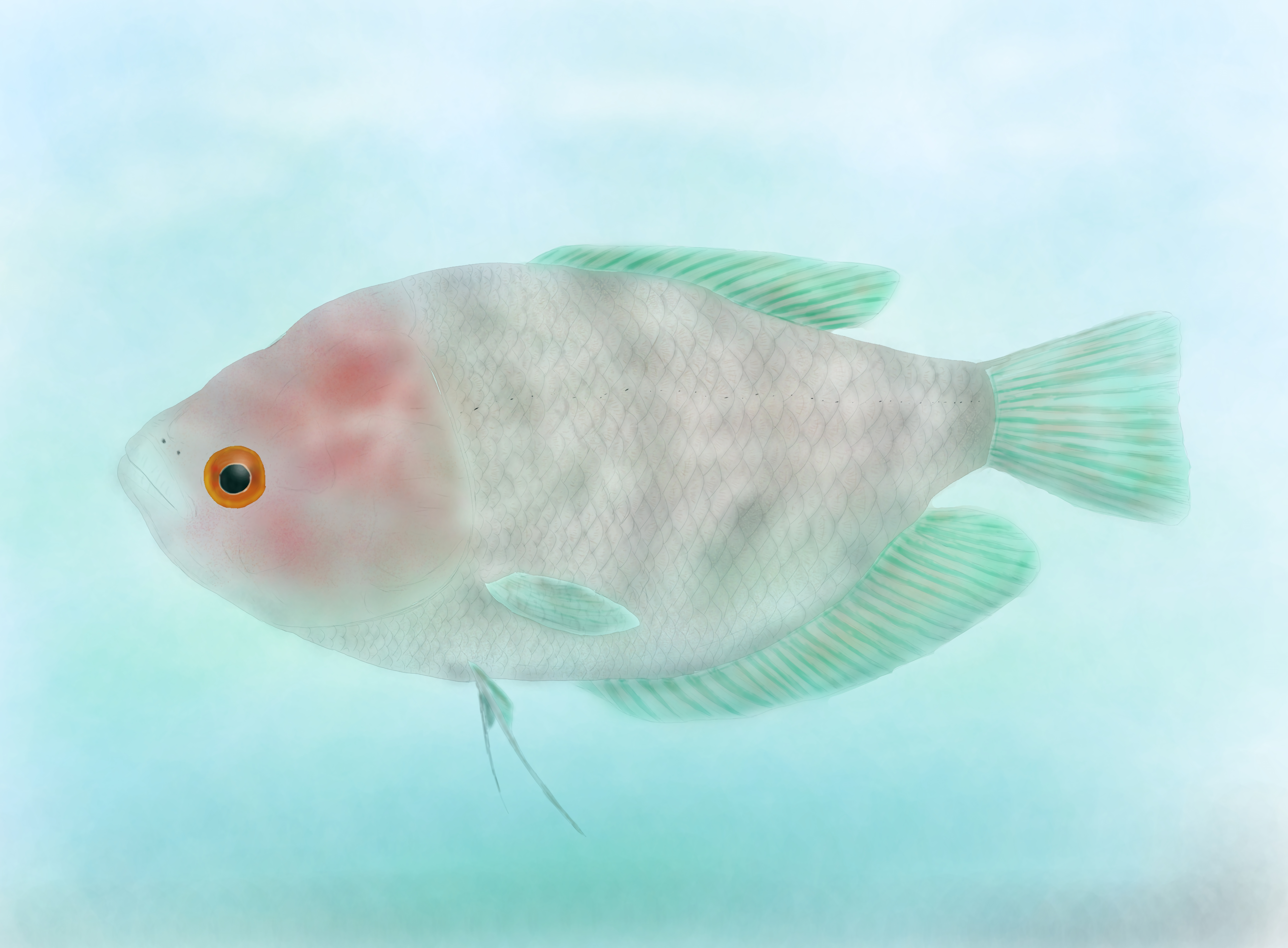
Reconstruction based on Murray, 2009
