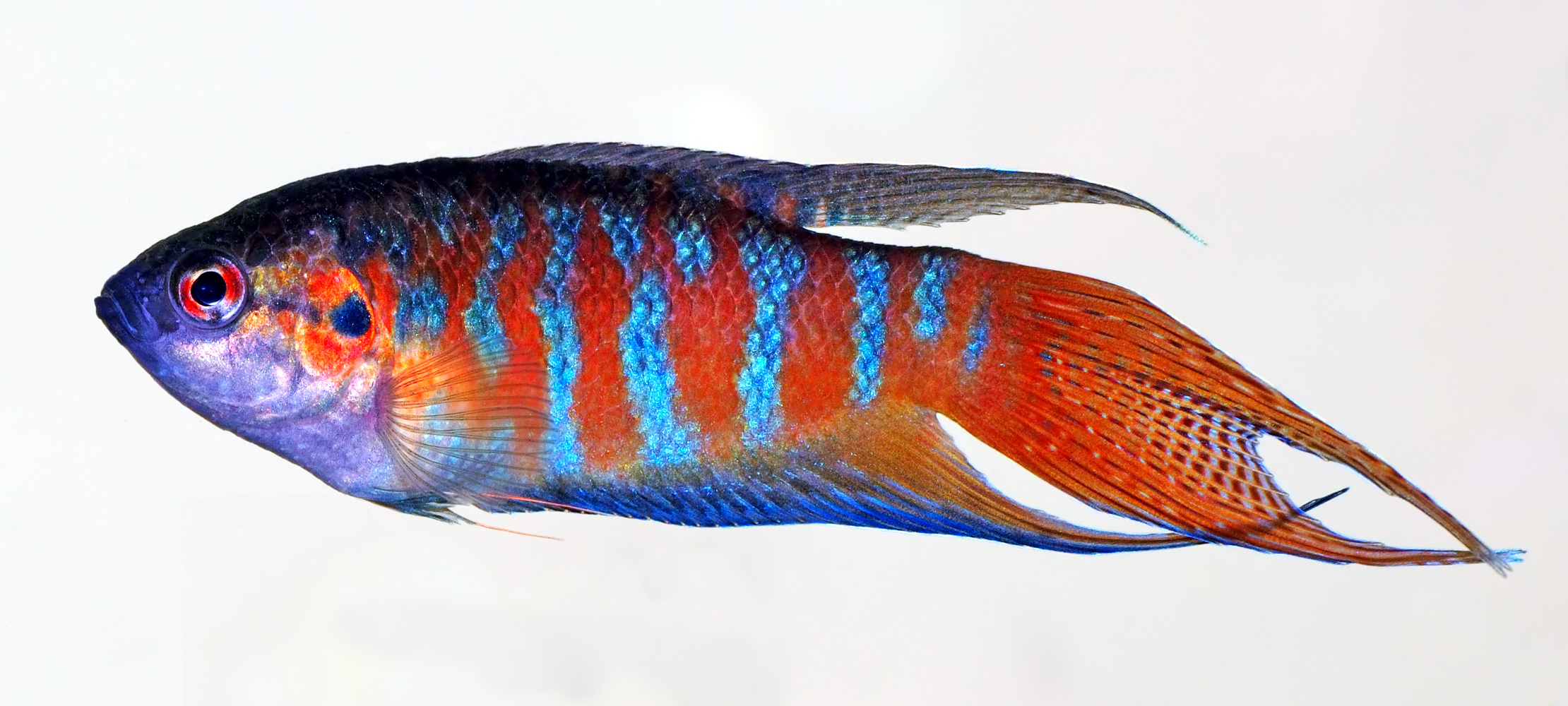
- Macropodus opercularis male

Conservation status
- Least Concern (IUCN 3.1)

Scientific classification
- Kingdom: Animalia
- Phylum: Chordata
- Class: Actinopterygii
- Division: Teleostei
- Order: Anabantiformes
- Family: Osphronemidae
- Genus: Macropodus
- Species: M. opercularis

Binomial name
- Macropodus opercularis (Linnaeus, 1758)
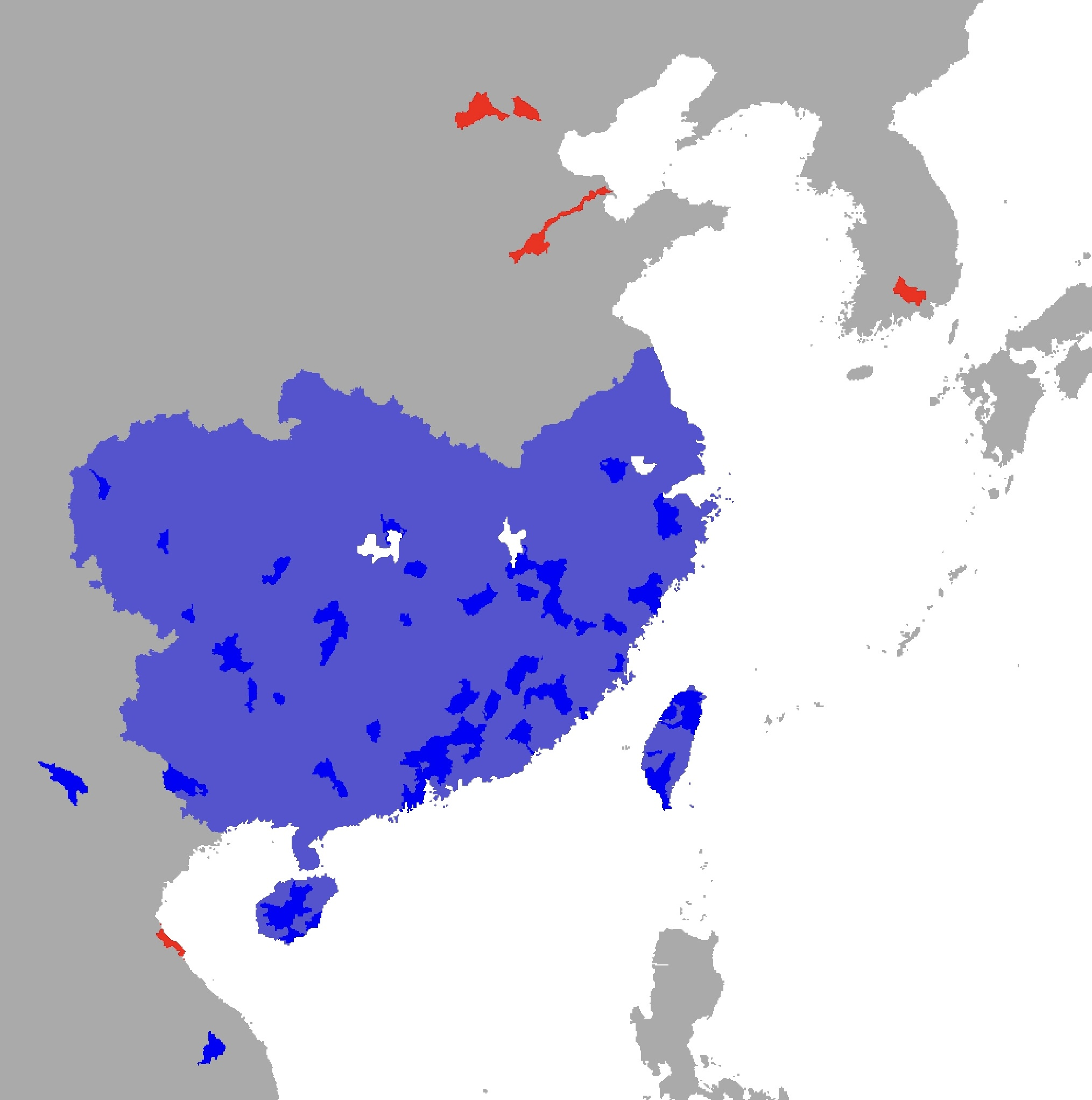

Synonyms
- Labrus opercularis Linnaeus, 1758; Chaetodon chinensis Bloch, 1790; Macropodus chinensis (Bloch, 1790); Macropodus viridiauratus Lacépède, 1801; Macropodus venustus Cuvier, 1831; Macropodus ctenopsoides Brind, 1915; Macropodus filamentosus Oshima, 1919

= Paradise fish =

Species of fish

The fork-tailed paradisefish, or paradise gourami (often simply known as paradise fish, paradise-fish, or paradisefish [Macropodus opercularis]), is a species of pelagic, long-finned, freshwater, ray-finned fish in the family Osphronemidae, found in most fresh waters of East Asia ranging from eastern China south to northern Vietnam. This anabantiform fish can reach a standard length of 6.7 cm (2 5/8 in), though most are only about 5.5 cm (2 3/16 in). Paradise fish were the second Chinese ornamental fish introduced to the West after the goldfish, and the first freshwater tropical fish successfully bred in captivity in Europe, having been imported 1869 to France by the French aquarium fish importer Pierre Carbonnier in Paris. The paradise fish is one of the more aggressive members of its family. It is more aggressive than the three-spot gourami, yet less pugnacious in nature than the less commonly kept combtail.

== Behaviour ==
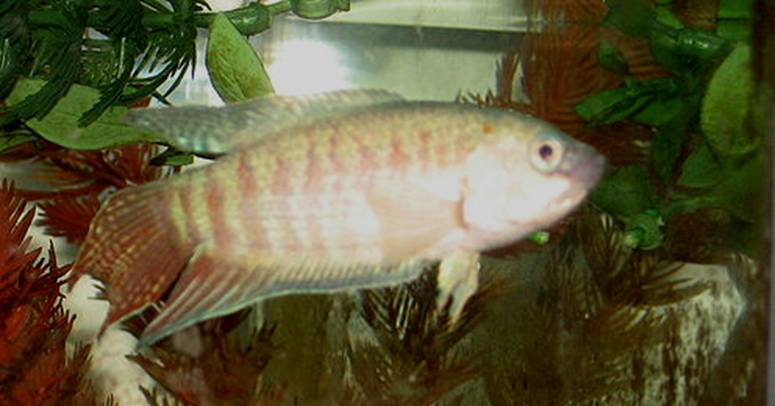
Albino paradise fish

Paradise fish are fairly combative, harassing and attacking each other, as well as potentially assaulting and killing small fish. During a fight, the paradise fish often changes its color, usually displaying dark blue lateral lines on the sides of its body, extends its fins, and spreads out its operculum. Paradise fish are more likely to show aggressive behavior towards other paradise fish than to fish of a different species. Acts of aggression tend to increase as the distance to the fish's home in Asia increases. In the wild, they are predators, eating insects, invertebrates, and fish fry. The popularity of this species has waned in recent decades, as much more colorful (and often less aggressive) species of gouramis have become widely available to hobbyists. This species is one of the few fish that can change its color (lighter or darker) in response to stimuli. Also, paradise fish apparently are capable of learning through a type of restrictive process. Most forms of active teaching seem to hinder the paradise fish's ability to learn the movements of its owner by careful observation.

== Habitat and diet ==
Paradise fish are tolerant of a wide range of water conditions, surviving in cool and warm waters alike. In the wild, they are most commonly found in shallow water containing dense vegetation, such as a marsh or rice field. They can be kept in outdoor ponds or even the simplest of unheated aquaria. They accept virtually any food, but should be given a reasonably high-protein diet (as opposed to vegetable-based foods.) They also eat mosquito larvae, black worms, brine shrimp, and small flies.

== Disease control ==
In Taiwan, the native populations of paradise fish have been reduced to low levels by pollution in the rivers, and they are now listed as a threatened species. The local population of yellow fever mosquitoes (Aedes aegypti) has since increased in the absence of one of its main predators. The infection rate for dengue fever has subsequently increased in the human population, caused in part by to the lack of natural mosquito predators.

Paradise fish are also considered to be an ideal subject for behavioral genetic studies and have been used to study Iridoviridae-type viruses.

== In home aquaria ==
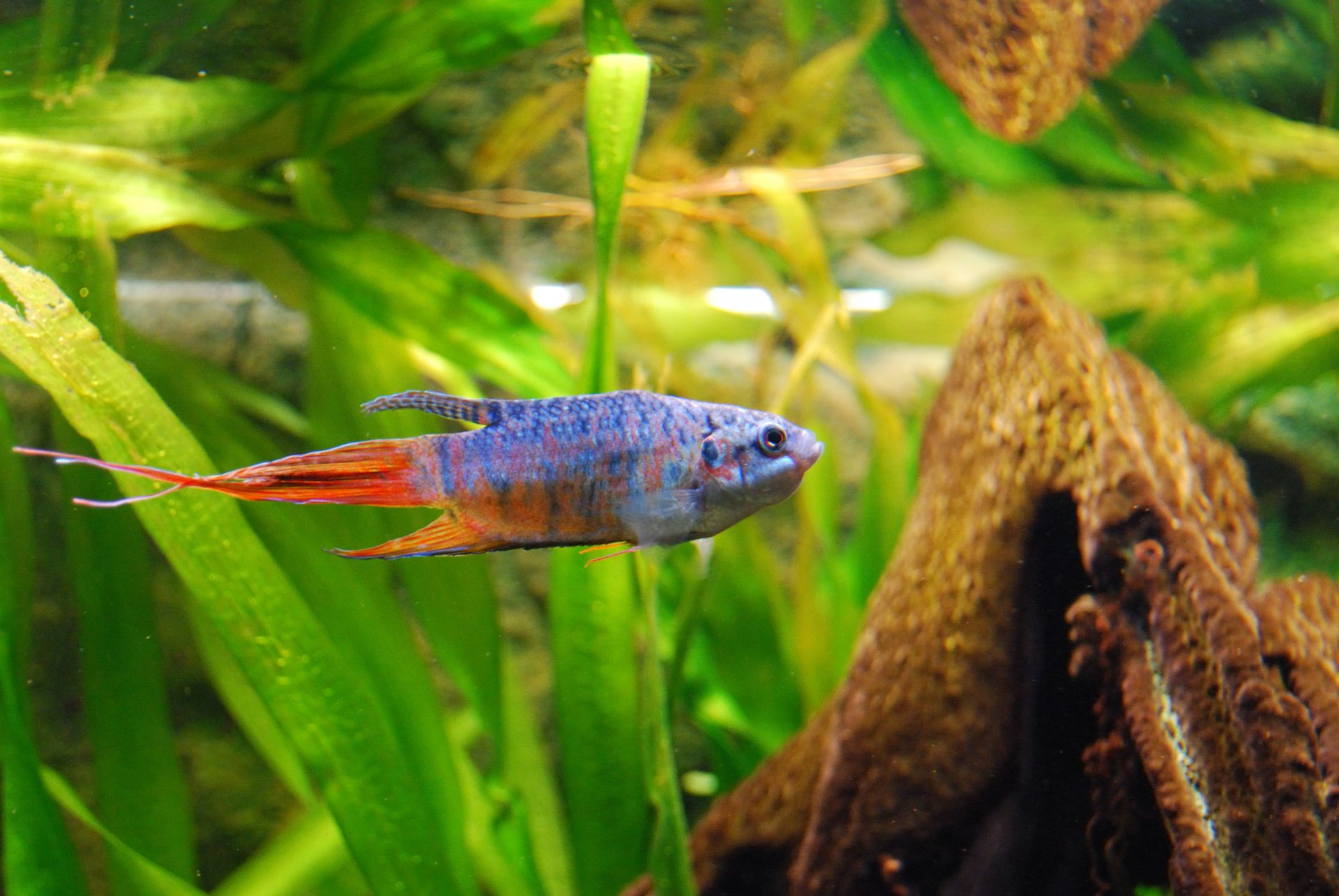
Male in a home aquarium

Male paradise fish should be kept apart, since they fight aggressively by locking jaws. A male can be kept with females; females may also be kept together in groups. A tank that includes paradise fish should be at least 20 US gallons (76 L; 17 imp gal) in size for a single male or 20–30 US gallons (76–114 L; 17–25 imp gal) for a community tank. The tank should be well planted and covered; bogwood and rockwork may be included.

Paradise fish tankmates must be chosen with care. Suitable ones include giant danios, large tetras, most smaller catfishes, and even some of the less aggressive cichlids, such as firemouth cichlids. Slow-moving or long-finned fish such as fancy goldfish and freshwater angelfish are likely to be attacked by males; bettas and gouramis may also be victimized due to their resemblance to paradise fish. Male paradise fish may also attempt to court female bettas and gouramis.

Fish less than 1.8 centimetres (11/16 in) are likely to be consumed violently. If kept with significantly larger but nonaggressive fish, such as Geophagus cichlids, large Synodontis catfishes, or larger gouramis, they are usually submissive and do not act nearly as abusively as when they are the dominant species in the aquarium. However, they themselves can be bullied by similar sized or even smaller fish if that fish has already established territory in the tank which it is not willing to share or give up. If this is the case they will not even attempt to fight and will take to hiding behind filters, plants, or in décor, and will succumb to stress eating and diarrhoea.

== Reproduction ==
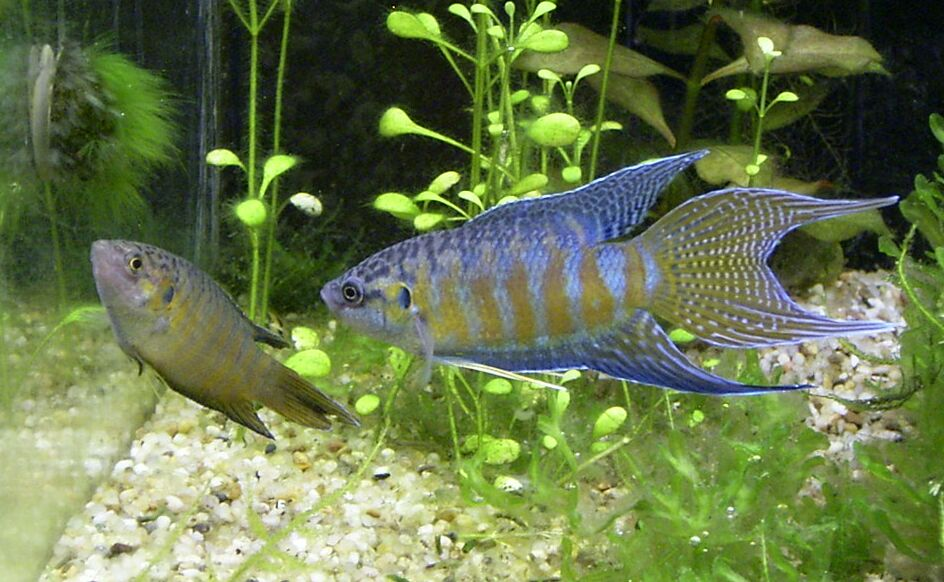
Sexing is easy, as males are more colorful and have longer fins compared to the females.

As is typical of most bettas and gouramis, spawning involves a male building a bubble nest (a floating mat of saliva-coated air bubbles, often incorporating plant matter) and attracting a female to it. If the female accepts the male's advances, the fish will 'embrace' in open water, releasing both eggs and sperm into the water. The male gathers the fertilized eggs after each embrace, spitting them up into the bubble nest. After spawning, the male may violently attack his mate or any other fish that might approach the new fertilized eggs or hatched fry, which are both a common source of food in the natural habitat. A breeder usually chooses to move the female to a separate tank to improve the chances of survival of both the female and the hatched fry. After the fry have begun to swim freely, the male's protective behavior subsides, so the breeder removes the male for the protection of the fry, and they are raised on infusoria or newly hatched brine shrimp.

An albino form of Macropodus opercularis is available. Many aquarists consider this form to be less aggressive than the wild type, but also less hardy, having more trouble with low temperatures.
