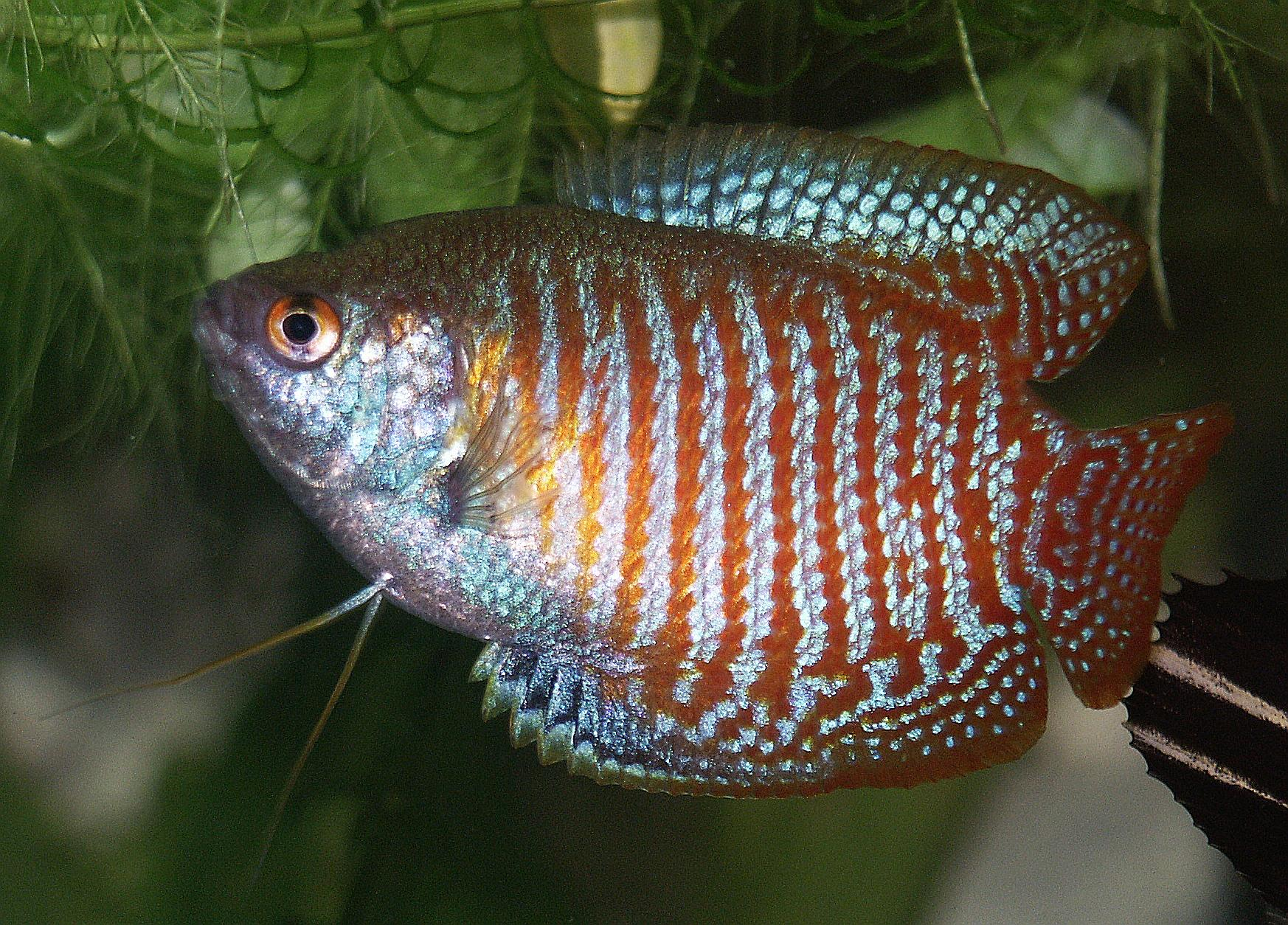
- Dwarf gourami (Trichogaster lalius)

Scientific classification
- Kingdom: Animalia
- Phylum: Chordata
- Class: Actinopterygii
- Division: Teleostei
- Order: Anabantiformes
- Suborder: Anabantoidei
- Family: Osphronemidae van der Hoeven, 1832

Subfamilies and genera
- See text

= Gourami =

Gourami Temporal range: Eocene–present

Family of fishes

Gouramis, or gouramies /ɡʊˈrɑːmi/, are a group of freshwater anabantiform fish that comprise the family Osphronemidae. The fish are native to Asia—from the Indian subcontinent to Southeast Asia and northeasterly towards Korea. The name "gourami", from the Sundanese word gurame, is also used for fish of the families Helostomatidae and Anabantidae.

Many gouramis have an elongated, feeler-like ray at the front of each of their pelvic fins. All living species show parental care until fry are free swimming; some are mouthbrooders, like the Krabi mouth-brooding betta (Betta simplex), and others, like the Siamese fighting fish (Betta splendens), build bubble nests. Currently, about 133 species are recognised, placed in four subfamilies and about 15 genera.

The name Polyacanthidae has also been used for this family. Some fish now classified as gouramis were previously placed in family Anabantidae. The subfamily Belontiinae was recently demoted from the family Belontiidae. As labyrinth fishes, gouramis have a lung-like labyrinth organ that allows them to gulp air and use atmospheric oxygen. This organ is a vital adaptation for fish that often inhabit warm, shallow, oxygen-poor water. Gouramis can live for 1–5 years.

The earliest fossil gourami is Ombilinichthys from the early to mid-Eocene Sangkarewang Formation of Sumatra, Indonesia. A second fossil taxon from the same formation, known from several specimens and tentatively assigned to Osphronemus goramy when analyzed in the 1930s, is now lost.

== Subfamilies and genera ==
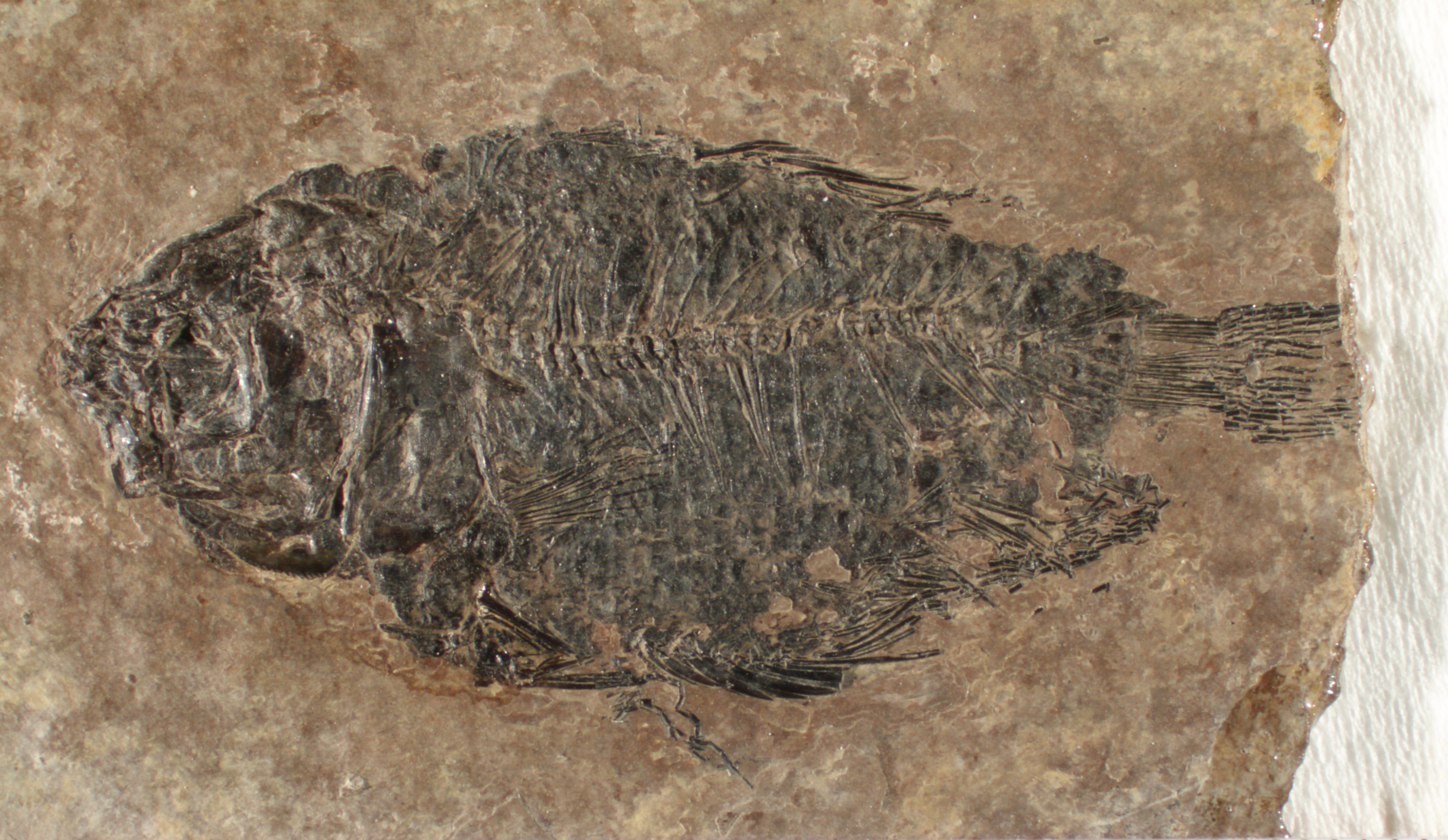
Ombilinichthys yamini is the oldest known gourami.

The family Osphronemidae is divided into these subfamilies and genera:

- Family Osphronemidae van der Hoeven, 1832
  - Genus †Ombilinichthys Murray, Zaim, Rizal, Aswan, Gunnell & Ciochon, 2015
  - Subfamily Belontiinae Liem, 1962
    - Belontia Myers, 1923
  - Subfamily Osphroneminae van der Hoeven, 1832
    - Osphronemus Lacépède, 1801
  - Subfamily Luciocephalinae Bleeker, 1852
    - Luciocephalus Bleeker, 1851
    - Sphaerichthys Canestrini, 1860
    - Ctenops McClelland, 1845
    - Parasphaerichthys Prashad & Mukerji, 1929
  - Subfamily Macropodusinae Hoedeman, 1948
    - Betta Bleeker, 1850
    - Parosphromenus Bleeker, 1877
    - Macropodus Lacepède, 1801
    - Malpulutta Deraniyagala, 1937
    - Nanosphronemus Britz, Tan & Rüber, 2026
    - Pseudosphromenus Bleeker, 1879
    - Trichopsis Canestrini, 1860
  - Subfamily Trichogastrinae Bleeker, 1879
    - Trichogaster Bloch & Schneider, 1801
    - Trichopodus Lacepède, 1801

== As food ==
Giant gouramis, Osphronemus goramy, or kaloi in Malay, are eaten in some parts of the world. In maritime Southeast Asian countries, they are often deep fried and served in sweet-sour sauce, chili sauce, and other spices. The paradise fish, Macropodus opercularis, and other members of that genus are the target of the cannery industry in China, the products of which are available in Asian supermarkets around the world. Gouramis are particularly found in Sundanese cuisine.

In Malaysia, Indonesia, Thailand, the Philippines, and Brunei, gouramis are readily fished from streams, brooks, canals, rivers, and many other large water area systems.

== In the aquarium ==
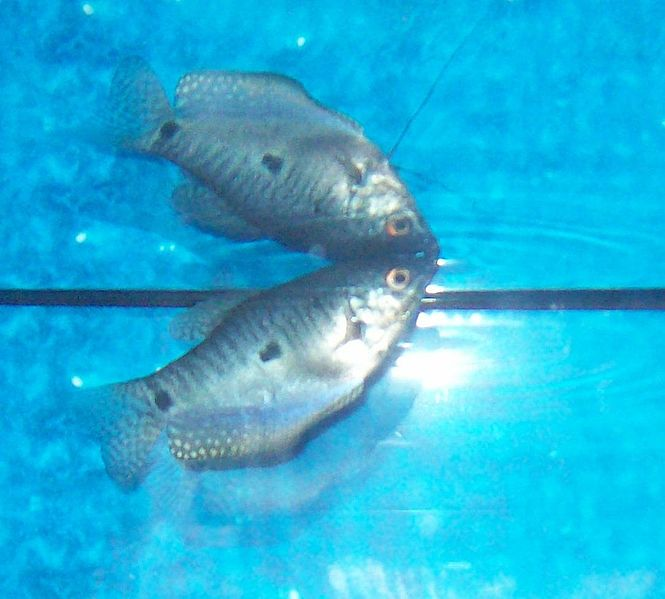
Female three spot gourami breathing air

Numerous gourami species, such as the dwarf gourami and pearl gourami, are popular aquarium fish widely kept throughout the world. They are sought after due to their bright colours and relative intelligence, being able to recognise their owners and "greeting" them, having a desire to explore the plants and rocks placed across their aquarium, and displaying extensive paternal care, with the males protecting the eggs until they hatch, and building a foam raft to keep them afloat. As labyrinth fish, they often swim near the top of the tank to breathe air. As with other tropical freshwater fish, an aquarium heater is often used. Gouramis eat either prepared or live foods. Some species can grow quite large and are unsuitable for the general hobbyist. Big gouramis may become territorial with fish that are colourful and a comparable size to them, but that generally depends on the individual's temperament, as some gouramis are more tolerant of tankmates than others. Gouramis may nip at other fish, and males should never be kept together, as they will become aggressive.

=== Compatibility ===
Generally regarded as peaceful, gouramis are still capable of harassing or killing smaller or long-finned fish. Depending on the species, adult and juvenile males have been known to spar with one another. Aggression can also occur as a result of overcrowding.

Gouramis have been housed with many species, such as danios, mollies, silver dollars, Neon tetras, and plecostomus catfish. Compatibility depends on the species of gourami and the fish with which it is housed. Some species (e.g., Macropodus or Belontia) are highly aggressive or predatory and may harass or kill smaller or less aggressive fish; whereas, others (Parosphromenus and Sphaerichthys, for instance) are very shy or have specific water requirements, thus can be outcompeted by typical community fish.

== Gallery ==
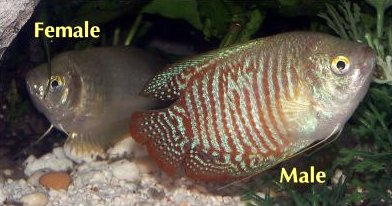
Female and male dwarf gouramis (Trichogaster lalius) showing sexual dimorphism

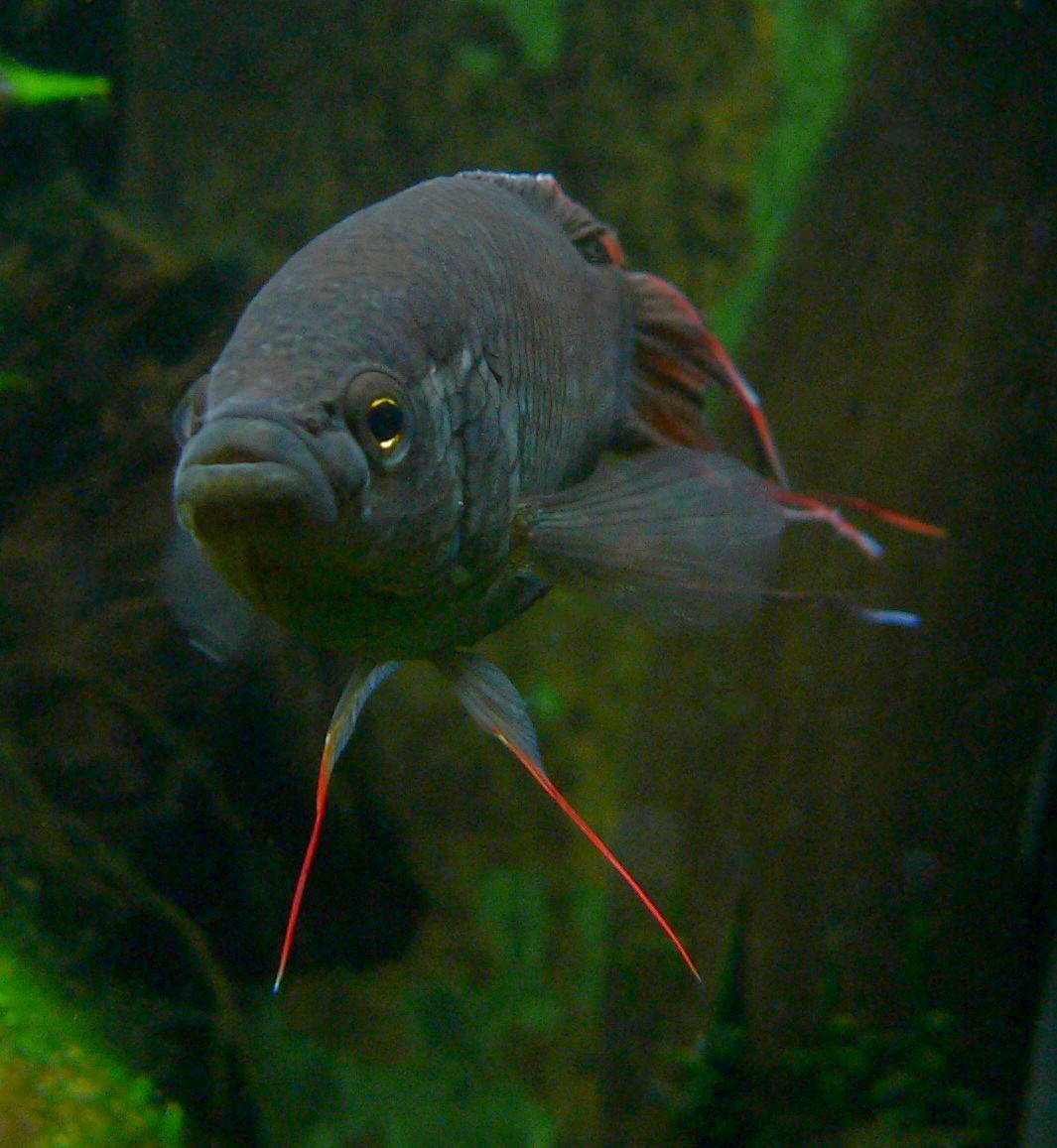
Macropodus erythropterus

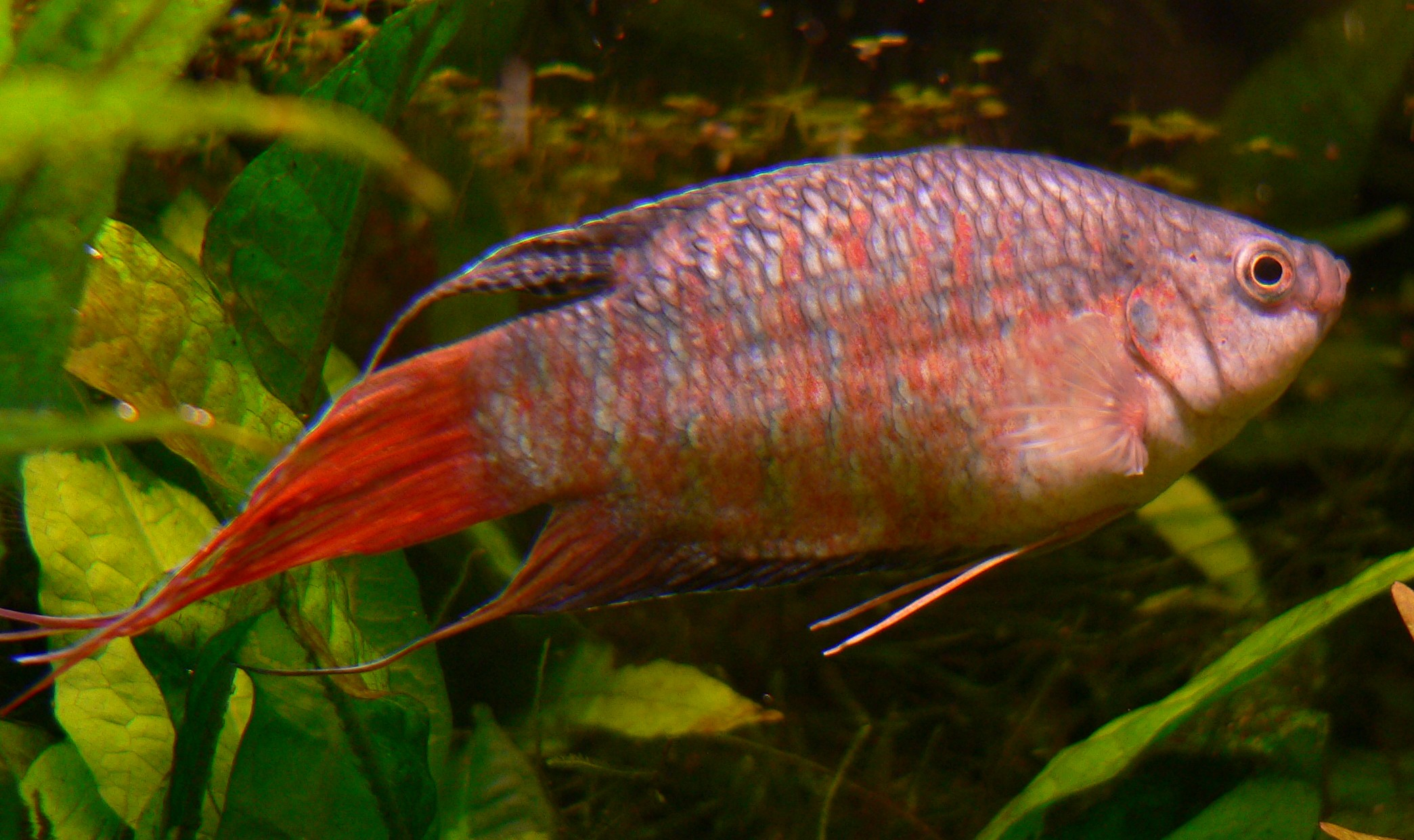
Paradise fish (Macropodus opercularis)

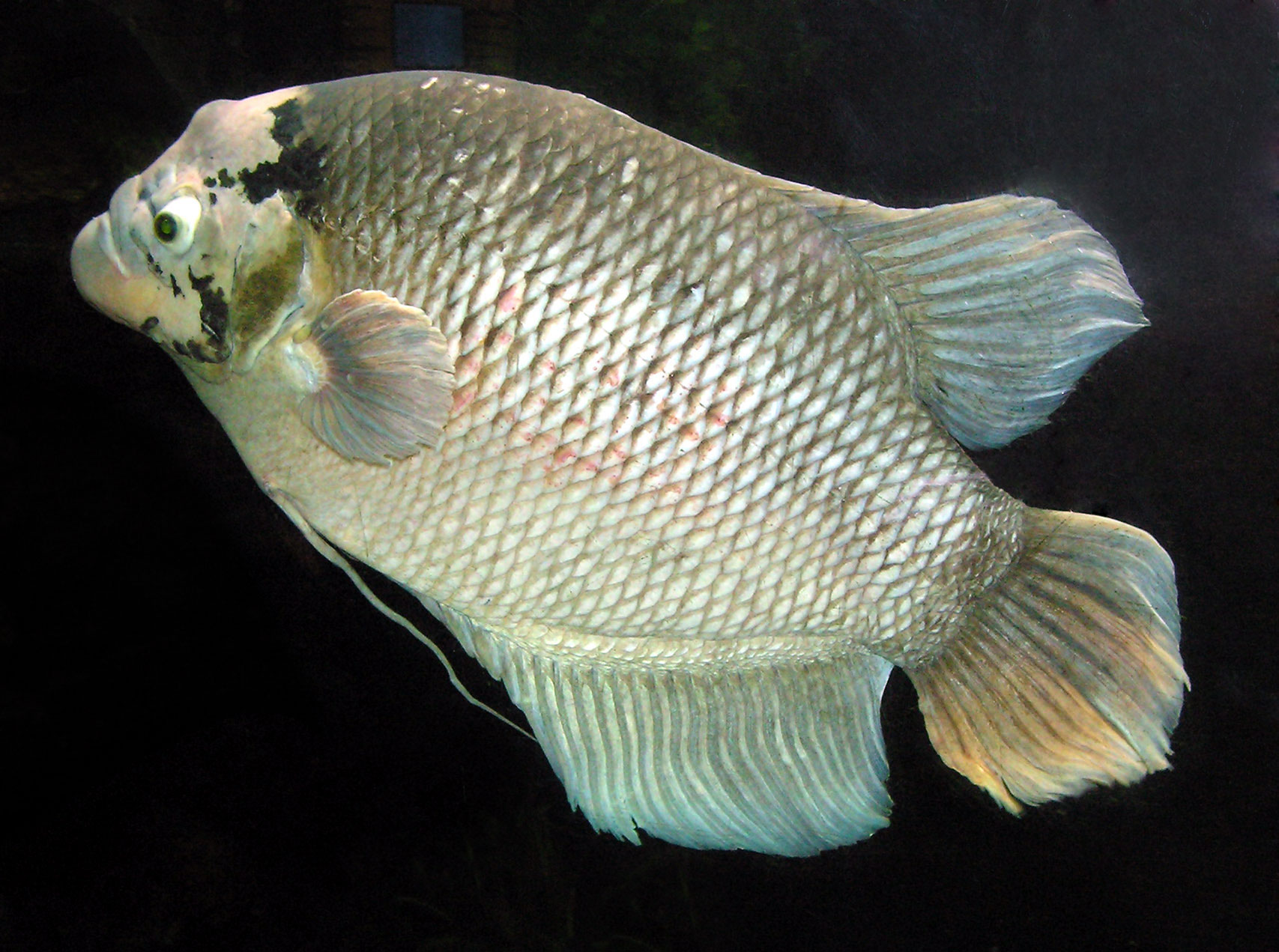
Giant gourami (Osphronemus goramy)

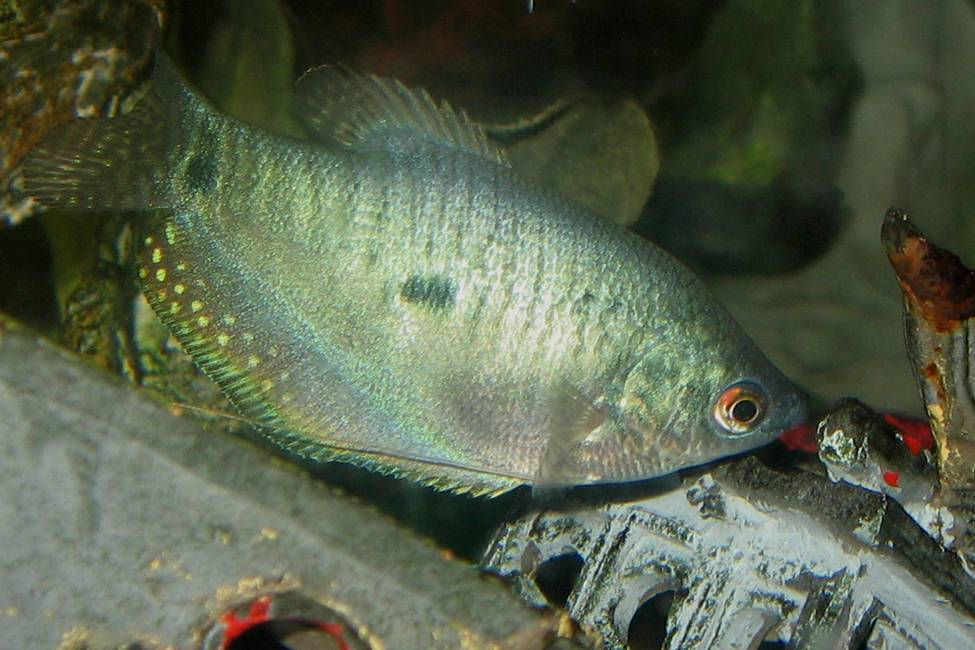
Three spot gourami (Trichopodus trichopterus)

Gold gourami
color morph of Trichopodus trichopterus

== See also ==
The name "gourami" is also used for several other related fish that are now placed in different families:

- Kissing gourami (the sole species in the family Helostomatidae)
- Climbing gouramis (family Anabantidae)
