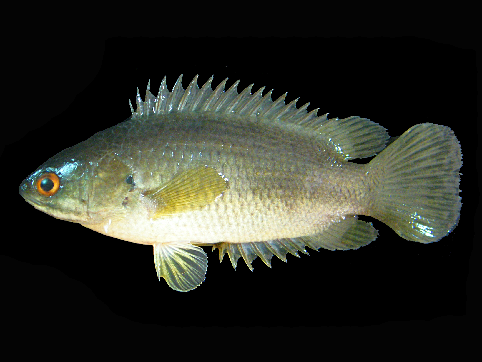
- Climbing perch (Anabas testudineus)

Scientific classification
- Kingdom: Animalia
- Phylum: Chordata
- Class: Actinopterygii
- Division: Teleostei
- Clade: Percomorpha
- Order: Anabantiformes; Li, Dettaï, Cruaud, Couloux, Desoutter-Meniger & Lecointre, 2009

Type species
- Anabas testudineus (Bloch, 1792)

Suborders and families
- See text

Synonyms
- Labyrinthici (Cuvier & Valenciennes, 1828)

= Anabantiformes =

Anabantiformes Temporal range: Eocene–present

Order of fishes

Anabantiformes /ænəˈbæntɪfɔːrmiːz/ is an order of freshwater bony fish. They are collectively known as labyrinth fish and possess a special respiratory organ (the labyrinth) that allows them to breathe atmospheric oxygen at the surface. Native to Asia and Africa, they include popular aquarium fish such as bettas and gouramis, and are able to survive in low-oxygen waters.

They are an order of air-breathing freshwater ray-finned fish with three suborders, eight families, and at least 350 species. This order is the sister group to the Synbranchiformes, with both comprising the monophyletic clade Anabantaria. Anabantaria is a sister group to the Carangiformes, with the clade comprising both being a sister clade to the Ovalentaria. This group of fish are found in Asia and Africa, with some species introduced to North America.

These fish are characterized by the presence of teeth on the parasphenoid. The snakeheads and the anabantoids are united by the presence of the labyrinth organ, which is a highly folded suprabranchial accessory breathing organ. It is formed by vascularized expansion of the epibranchial bone of the first gill arch and used for respiration in air.

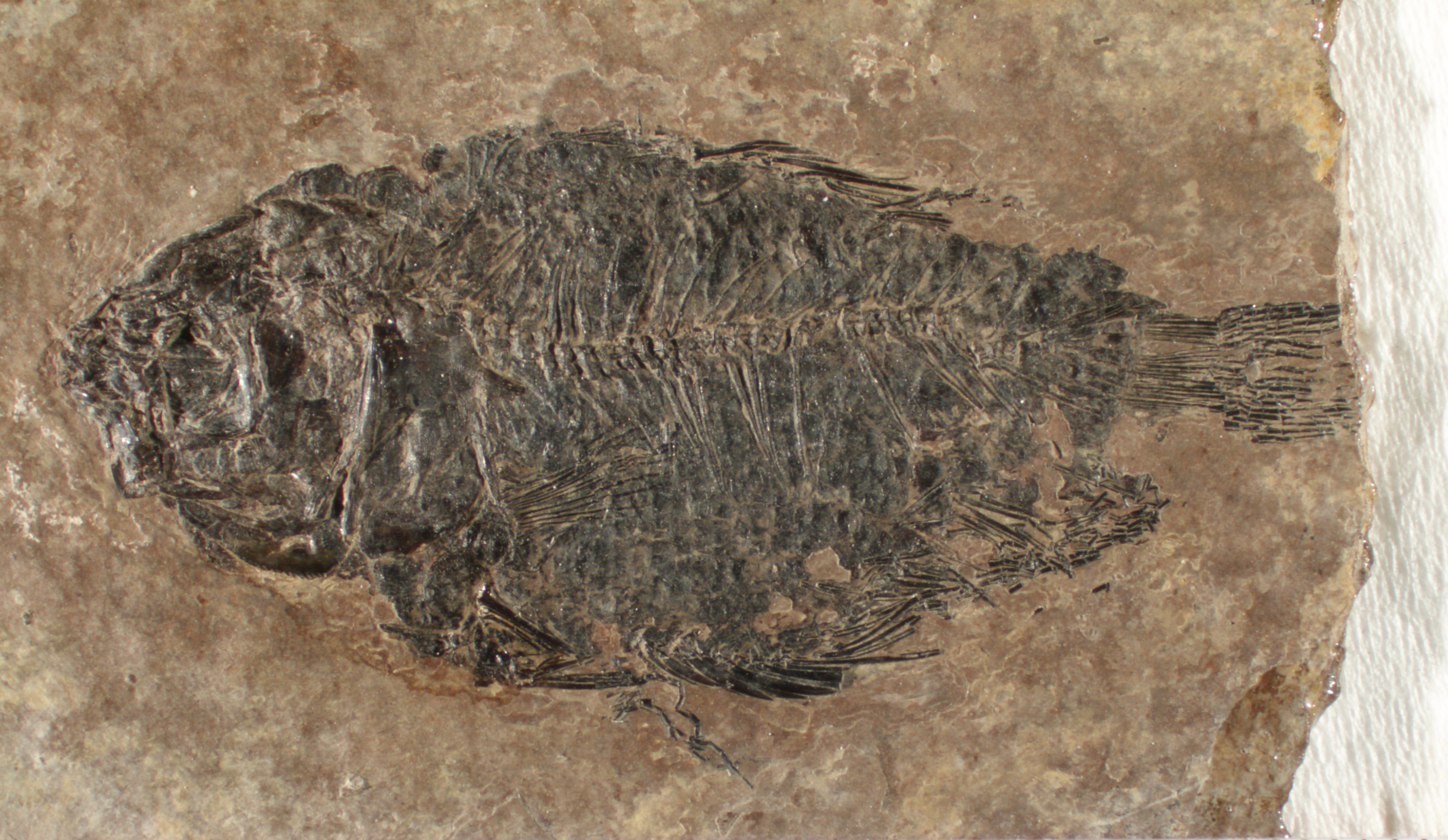
Ombilinichthys yamini is one of the few anabantiform fossils.

Many species are popular as aquarium fish - the most notable are the Siamese fighting fish and several species of gouramies. In addition to being aquarium fish, some of the larger anabantiforms (such as the giant gourami) are also harvested for food in their native countries.

== Taxonomy ==
There are three suborders and eight families currently recognized within the order Anabantiformes:

- Order Anabantiformes
  - Suborder Anabantoidei Berg, 1940
    - Family Anabantidae Bonaparte, 1831
      - †Eoanabas Wu, Chang, Miao et al., 2016
      - Anabas Cloquet, 1816
      - Ctenopoma Peters, 1844
      - Microctenopoma Norris, 1995
      - Sandelia Castelnau, 1861
    - Family Helostomatidae Gill, 1872
      - Helostoma Cuvier, 1829
    - Family Osphronemidae van der Hoeven, 1832
      - †Ombilinichthys Murray et al., 2015a
      - Subfamily Belontiinae Liem, 1962
        - Belontia Myers, 1923
      - Subfamily Osphroneminae van der Hoeven, 1832
        - Osphronemus Lacépède, 1801
      - Subfamily Luciocephalinae Bleeker, 1852
        - Luciocephalus Bleeker, 1851
        - Sphaerichthys Canestrini, 1860
        - Ctenops McClelland, 1845
        - Parasphaerichthys Prashad & Mukerji, 1929
      - Subfamily Macropodusinae Hoedeman, 1948
        - Trichogaster Bloch & Schneider, 1801
        - Trichopodus Lacepède, 1801
        - Betta Bleeker, 1850
        - Parosphromenus Bleeker, 1877
        - Macropodus Lacepède, 1801
        - Malpulutta Deraniyagala, 1937
        - Pseudosphromenus Bleeker, 1879
        - Trichopsis Canestrini, 1860
  - Suborder Channoidei Berg, 1940
    - Family Aenigmachannidae Britz et al., 2020
      - Aenigmachanna Britz, Anoop, Dahanukar & Raghavan, 2019
    - Family Channidae Fowler, 1934
      - †Anchichanna Murray & Thewissen, 2008 (one species)
      - †Eochanna Roe, 1991
      - Parachanna Teugels & Daget, 1984
      - Channa Scopoli, 1777
  - Suborder Nandoidei Bleeker, 1852
    - Family Nandidae Bleeker, 1852
      - Nandus Valenciennes, 1831
    - Family Badidae Barlow, Liem & Wickler, 1968
      - Badis Bleeker, 1853
      - Dario Kullander & Britz, 2002
    - Family Pristolepididae Regan, 1913
      - ?†Palaeopristolepis Borkar, 1973
      - Pristolepis Jerdon, 1849

=== Alternative systematics ===
==== Phylogeny ====
Below shows the phylogenetic relationships among the Anabantiform families after Collins et al. (2015), here including the Nandoidei as Anabantiforms:

- Anabantiformes
  - Nandoidei
    - Pristolepididae
    - - Badidae
      - Nandidae
  - - Channoidei
      - Channidae
      - Aenigmachannidae
    - Anabantoidei
      - - Anabantidae
        - - Helostomatidae
          - Osphronemidae
