= List of fishes of Kaziranga National Park =

The Kaziranga National Park is home to a wide variety of aquatic life including about 42 species of freshwater fish. These species include speciality species such as a freshwater pufferfish Tetraodon cutcutia.

== List of fishes found in Kaziranga ==
- Amblypharyngodon mola
- Amphipnous cuchia
- Bagarius bagarius
- Xenentodon cancila
- Catla catla
- Chanda nama
- Channa amphibia
- Channa orientalis
- Channa marulius
- Channa punctata
- Channa striatus
- Cirrhina mrigala
- Clarius batrachus
- Colisa lalius
- Colisa fasciata
- Eutropiichthys vachaH
- Gudiusia chapra
- Glossogobius giuris
- Heteropneustes fossilis
- Labeo bata
- Labeo calbasu
- Labeo rohita
- Labeo nandina
- Labeo gonius
- Mastacembelus armatus
- Mystus bleekeri
- Mystus cavasius
- Mystus menoda
- Aorichthys seenghala
- Mystus vittatus
- Nandus nandus
- Notopterus chitala
- Notopterus notopterus
- Ompak pabo
- Salmostoma bacaila
- Puntius ticto
- Puntius sarana
- Rasbora daniconius
- Rasbora elenga
- Tetraodon cutcutia
- Wallago attu
- Anabas testudineus

== See also ==
- List of fish in India
