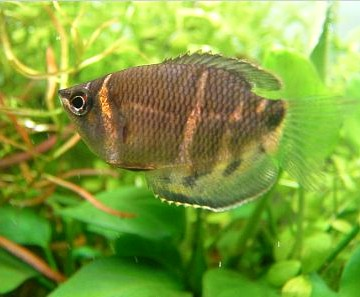

Conservation status
- Data Deficient (IUCN 3.1)

Scientific classification
- Kingdom: Animalia
- Phylum: Chordata
- Class: Actinopterygii
- Division: Teleostei
- Order: Anabantiformes
- Family: Osphronemidae
- Genus: Sphaerichthys
- Species: S. osphromenoides

Binomial name
- Sphaerichthys osphromenoides Canestrini, 1860

= Chocolate gourami =

Species of fish

The chocolate gourami (Sphaerichthys osphromenoides) is a species of gourami native to the Malay Peninsula, Sumatra, and Borneo.

== Taxonomy ==
Sphaerichthys selatanensis has once been treated as a subspecies of this species; now it is deemed to be a closely related but separate species.

== Description ==
As the common name suggests, the chocolate gourami has a chocolate color; additionally, golden bands run down the flanks. This species may reach a length of 6 cm (2.4 in).

== Ecology ==
The chocolate gourami is restricted to peat habitats. Unlike many other labyrinth fish, which breed by incubating their eggs in a bubble nest, this species is a mouthbrooder. Even more unusually, this species is a maternal mouthbrooder, with the female incubating the eggs in her mouth; all other anabantoid mouthbrooders (with the exception of its close relative Sphaerichthys selatanensis) are paternal mouthbrooders, with the male carrying the eggs and young larvae. The chocolate gourami is omnivorous, but feeds primarily on insects.

== In the aquarium ==
The chocolate gourami is a popular aquarium fish, but is challenging to keep. Without optimum water conditions, it is susceptible to bacterial infections and skin parasites. It is best kept alone in a well-planted aquarium with gentle filtration. It requires soft, acidic water, and prefers a water temperature higher than most other fish (the ideal temperature range being 25–27 °C (77–81 °F)). The chocolate gourami is generally a fussy eater, preferring to eat live foods or freeze-dried, frozen equivalents over flake food.
