= Luciocephalus aura =

Conservation status
- Endangered (IUCN 3.1)

Scientific classification
- Kingdom: Animalia
- Phylum: Chordata
- Class: Actinopterygii
- Order: Anabantiformes
- Family: Osphronemidae
- Genus: Luciocephalus
- Species: L. aura

Binomial name
- Luciocephalus aura H. H. Tan & P. K. L. Ng, 2005
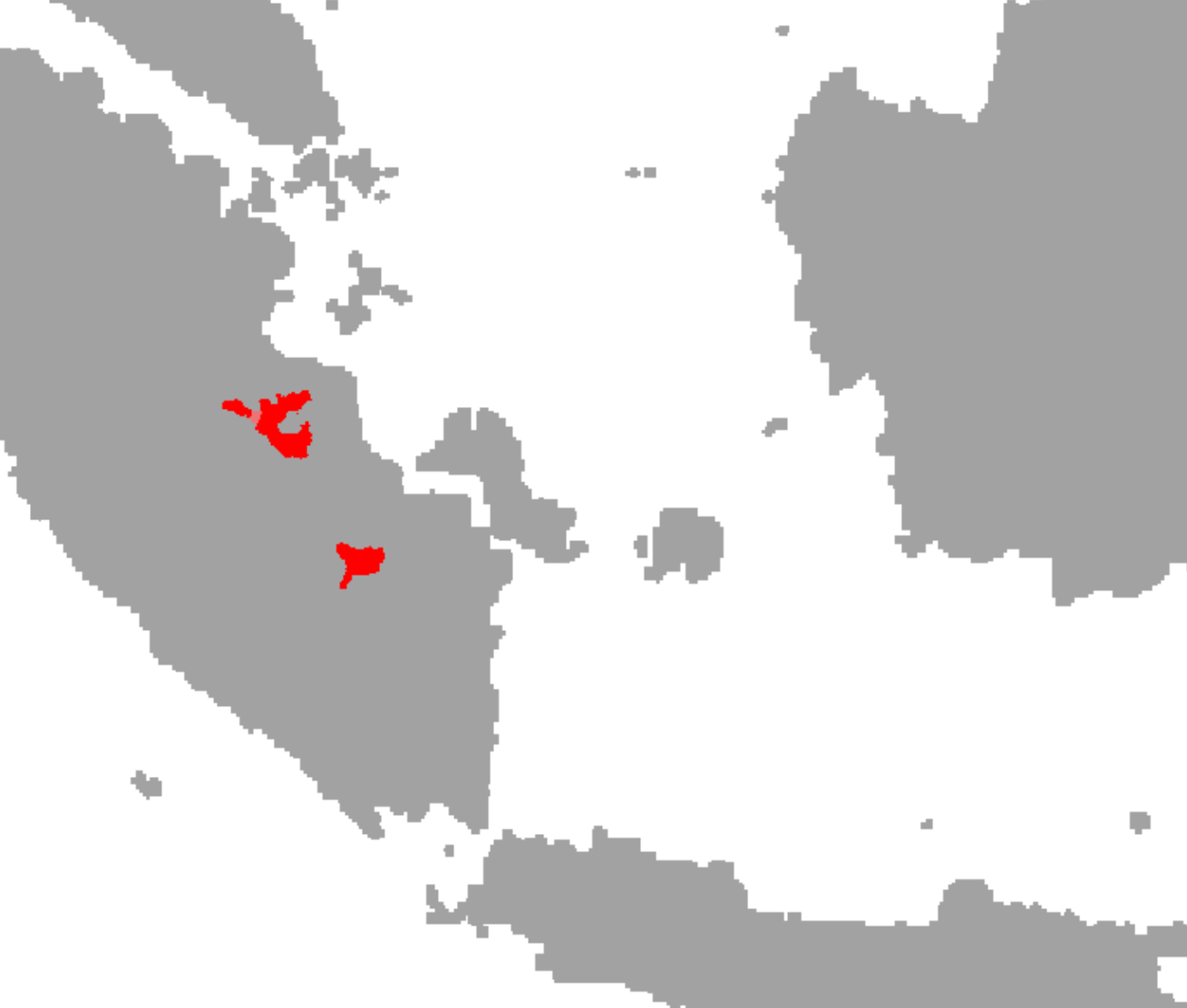
- Red:extant, light red: possibly extant

Species of fish

Luciocephalus aura, sometimes called the green-spotted pikehead or peppermint pikehead, is a species of freshwater ray-finned fish from the subfamily Luciocephalinae of the gourami family Osphronemidae. It is endemic to Sumatra where it has been recorded from the middle Batang Hari River and from the middle Musi River drainage. It is typically found in forested swamps. An undescribed similar taxon has been seen in central Kalimantan and this is possibly a third species in the genus Luciocephalus.

On Sumatra, Luciocephalus aura and L. pulcher are both found in the same areas but they appear to be syntopic with L. aura preferring the faster flowing habitats. It is an ambush predator and paternal mouthbrooder. It has a line of bright green spots along its flanks which distinguish it from L. pulcher. Luciocephalus aura reaches 10.5 cm (4.1 inches) in standard length and is known to be a facultative air-breather.
