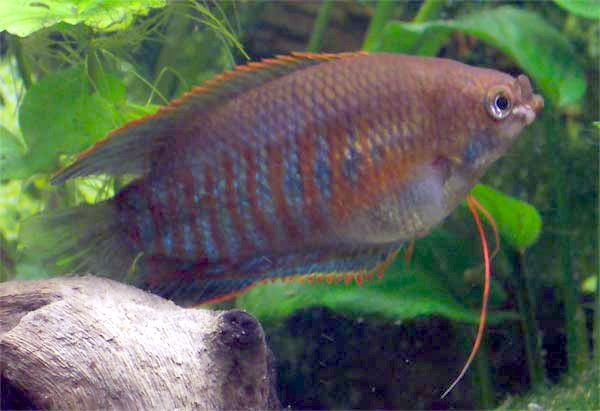

Conservation status
- Least Concern (IUCN 3.1)

Scientific classification
- Kingdom: Animalia
- Phylum: Chordata
- Class: Actinopterygii
- Order: Anabantiformes
- Family: Osphronemidae
- Genus: Trichogaster
- Species: T. labiosa

Binomial name
- Trichogaster labiosa F. Day, 1877
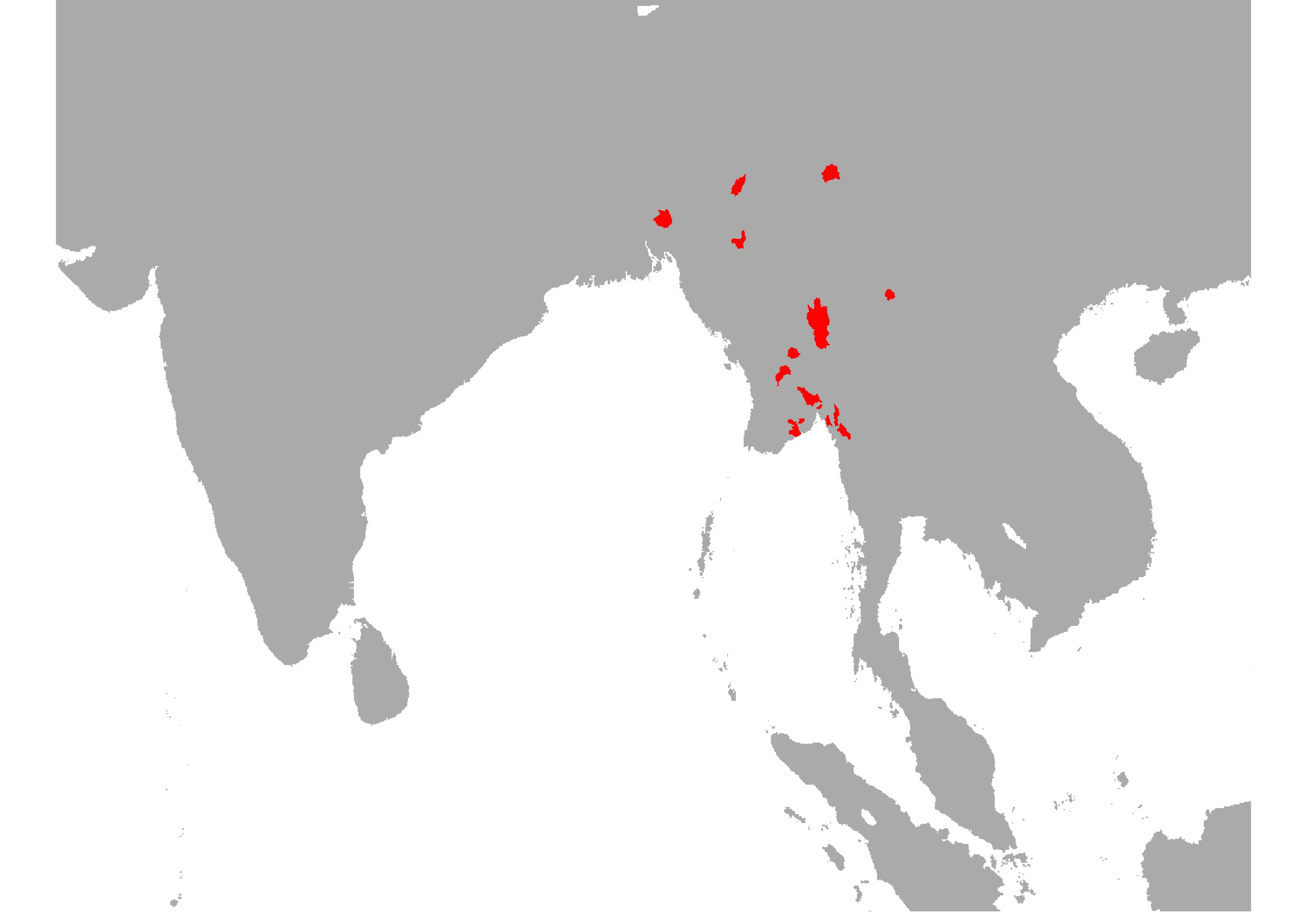

Synonyms
- Colisa labiosa (F. Day, 1877); Colisa labiosus (F. Day, 1877)

= Thick-lipped gourami =

Species of fish

The thick-lipped gourami (Trichogaster labiosa) is a species of gourami native to Southeast Asia, and is a popular aquarium fish.

== Description ==
Thick-lipped gouramis can reach a length of 9 centimetres (3.5 in) TL. They are sexually dimorphic, with the female being silvery, but the male marked with oblique thin red and blue stripes along its flanks. The male also has pointed tips in its dorsal fin.

== Distribution ==
This fish is a freshwater species native to south Myanmar. It has also been introduced into Colombia.

== Reproduction ==
Like most other gouramis, the thick-lipped gourami builds a bubble nest into which the eggs are placed. The male guards the eggs but ignores the fry.

== In the aquarium ==
The thick-lipped gourami has been widely transported around the world for the aquarium fish industry. It is a generally peaceful fish for a tropical community aquarium. Like other Trichogaster species, it tends to be a bit shy and hides under plant life when it feels threatened. It is kept in water that ranges from 22 to 28 °C (72 to 82 °F) and that is soft (50 mg/L) and acidic (pH 6.0 - 6.5). It eats a variety of foods including flake foods, bloodworms, and brine shrimp. Aquarists avoid keeping it with barbs or other fin-nippers who may damage their thread-like ventral fins.

T. labiosa are known to breed well. The male builds bubble nests and is not as likely as other species to bully the female if the female is not yet ready to spawn. It has been reported that the bubble nest continues to grow even after the eggs have been laid. Aquarists advise that filtration in the tank be gentle so as not to damage the bubble-nest.

The thick-lipped gourami has been deliberately crossbred with the banded gourami and the dwarf gourami to produce hybrids with new color patterns; these colors include gold, red, and green.
