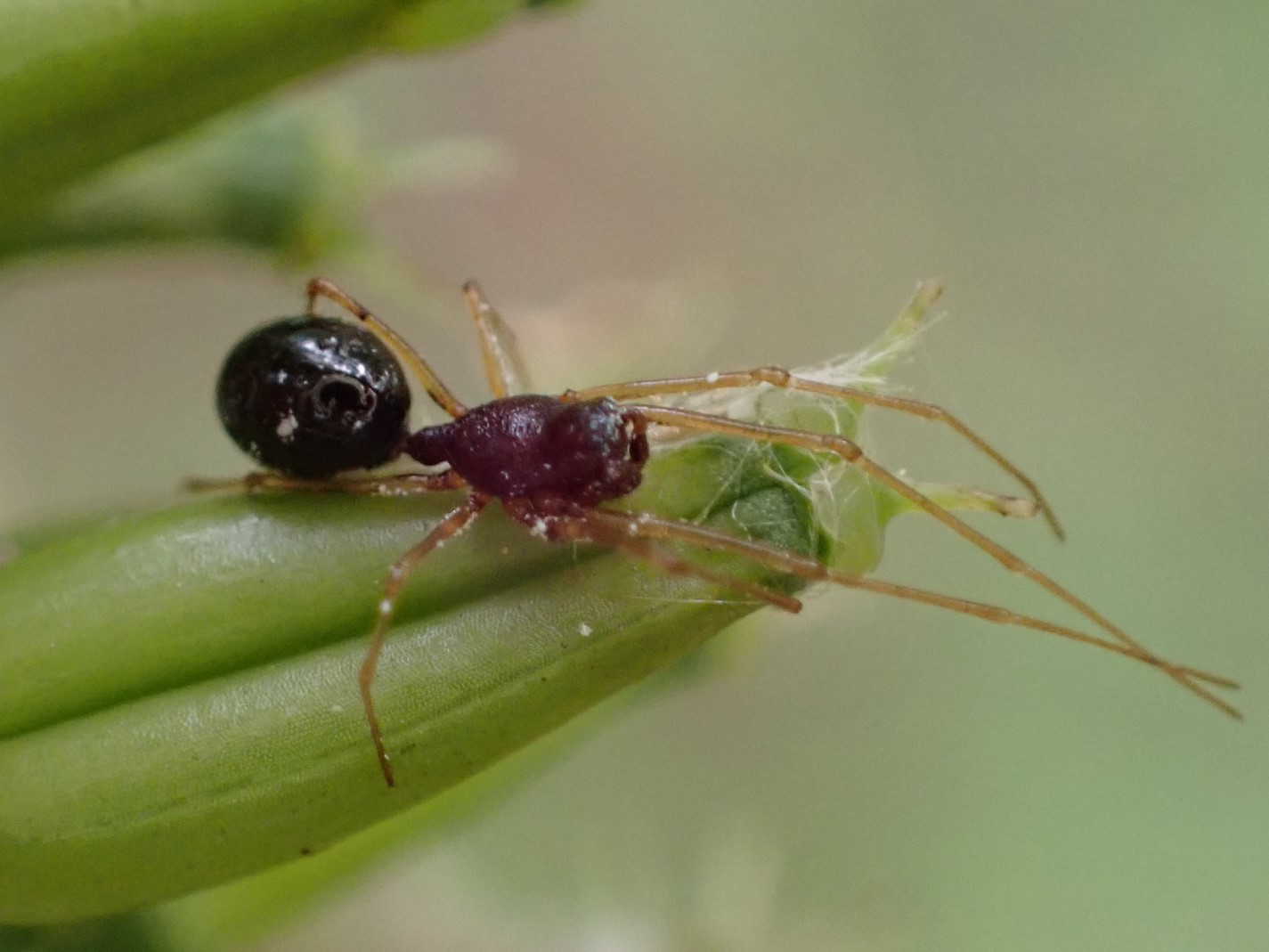
- Cresmatoneta mutinensis

Scientific classification
- Kingdom: Animalia
- Phylum: Arthropoda
- Subphylum: Chelicerata
- Class: Arachnida
- Order: Araneae
- Infraorder: Araneomorphae
- Family: Linyphiidae
- Genus: Cresmatoneta; Simon, 1929

Type species
- C. mutinensis (Canestrini, 1868)

Species
- C. leucophthalma (Fage, 1946) – India; C. mutinensis (Canestrini, 1868) – Southern Europe, Russia (Europe), Turkey, Caucasus; C. nipponensis Saito, 1988 – Korea, Japan

= Cresmatoneta =

Genus of spiders

Cresmatoneta is a genus of dwarf spiders that was first described by Eugène Louis Simon in 1929. As of May 2019 it contains only three species: C. leucophthalma, C. mutinensis, and C. nipponensis.
