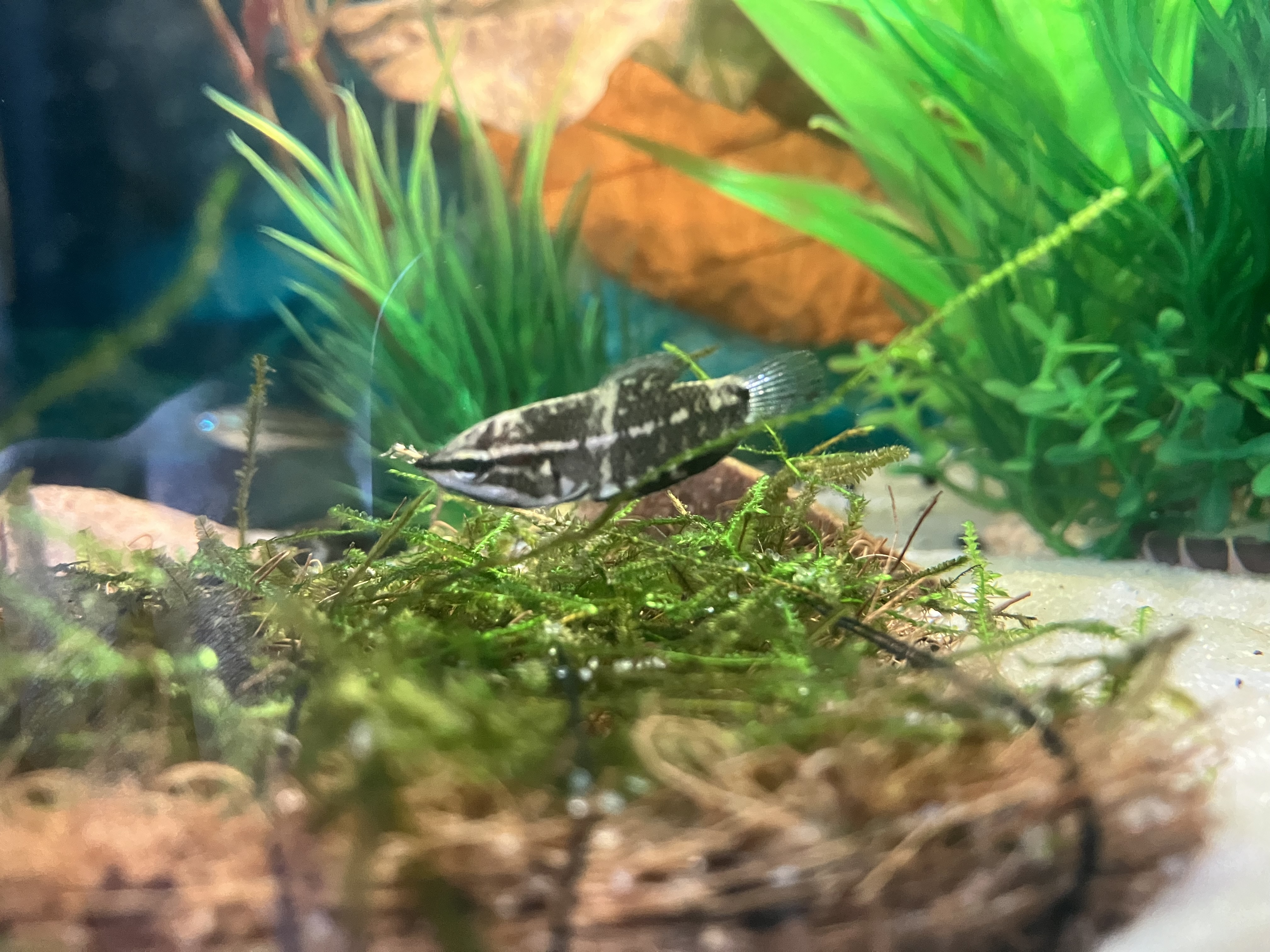
- Female (front); Male (back);

Conservation status
- Endangered (IUCN 3.1)

Scientific classification
- Kingdom: Animalia
- Phylum: Chordata
- Class: Actinopterygii
- Order: Anabantiformes
- Family: Osphronemidae
- Genus: Sphaerichthys
- Species: S. vaillanti

Binomial name
- Sphaerichthys vaillanti Pellegrin, 1930

= Sphaerichthys vaillanti =

Species of fish

Sphaerichthys vaillanti, known as Vaillant's chocolate gourami, samurai gourami, or samurai zebra gourami , is a species of gourami. It is native to Asia, where it is known from mainly the Kapuas river in the west Kalimantan, (Kalimantan Barat)^{[1]}, region of Borneo in Indonesia. It is generally seen in pairs in small creeks or drainage where wood debris is abundant. It is known to mimic dead leaves as a form of camouflage. The species reaches about 6 cm (2.5 inches) in standard length and is known to be a facultative air-breather.

== Taxonomy ==
This species descends from the ray-finned fishes, infraclass Teleostei, clade Percomorpha, and order Anabantiformes. It is an anabantoid from the family Osphronemidae (gouramis), and subfamily of Luciocephalinae. It is then from the genus Sphaerichthys and finally species vaillanti.

== Discovery and history ==
This species was collected by Léon Vaillant, who mistakenly first thought of it as a frail gourami (Ctenops nobilis).

It was then named after Vaillant by Jacques Pellegrin. The year of its description was 1832.

== Life cycle ==
Unlike many other fish species, the female of these mouthbrooders actually initiates the courting behavior, and during this time, they will remain upright for many hours during reproduction. The female will then lay the eggs, about 10–40, and the male will gather them in his mouth. He will then hide while the female guards the area to protect the eggs.

== Description ==
The male and female of this species have great sexual dimorphism as the females are brightly colored red with a predominant green and dark vertical stripes. The males are much simpler with a dull reddish brown with a few vertical and horizontal white lines. Juveniles are brown with clear caudal tails and white markings throughout. All of the coloring that these anabantoids have are to resemble the dead leaf litter and debris that is found naturally in their environment.

== Threats ==
This species is threatened in many ways in that it is an endemic species to Borneo. It is very sought after in the aquarium trade, making it vulnerable to going extinct due to mass collection. Habitat destruction and pollution from illegal gold mining also threaten this gourami, as by the time of discovery and conservation attempts it is speculated that a good amount of the population was already lost to human actions.

== Coexisting species ==
In the island of Borneo, the endemic plant genus of Bucephalandra grows in the many rivers, including the Kapuas River. Other fish species include clown loaches, tiger barbs, Shelford's loach, possibly the half-banded loach, and various species of bagrid catfish. One species of endemic snake, the Kapuas mud-snake, also lives in the river.

== In the aquarium ==
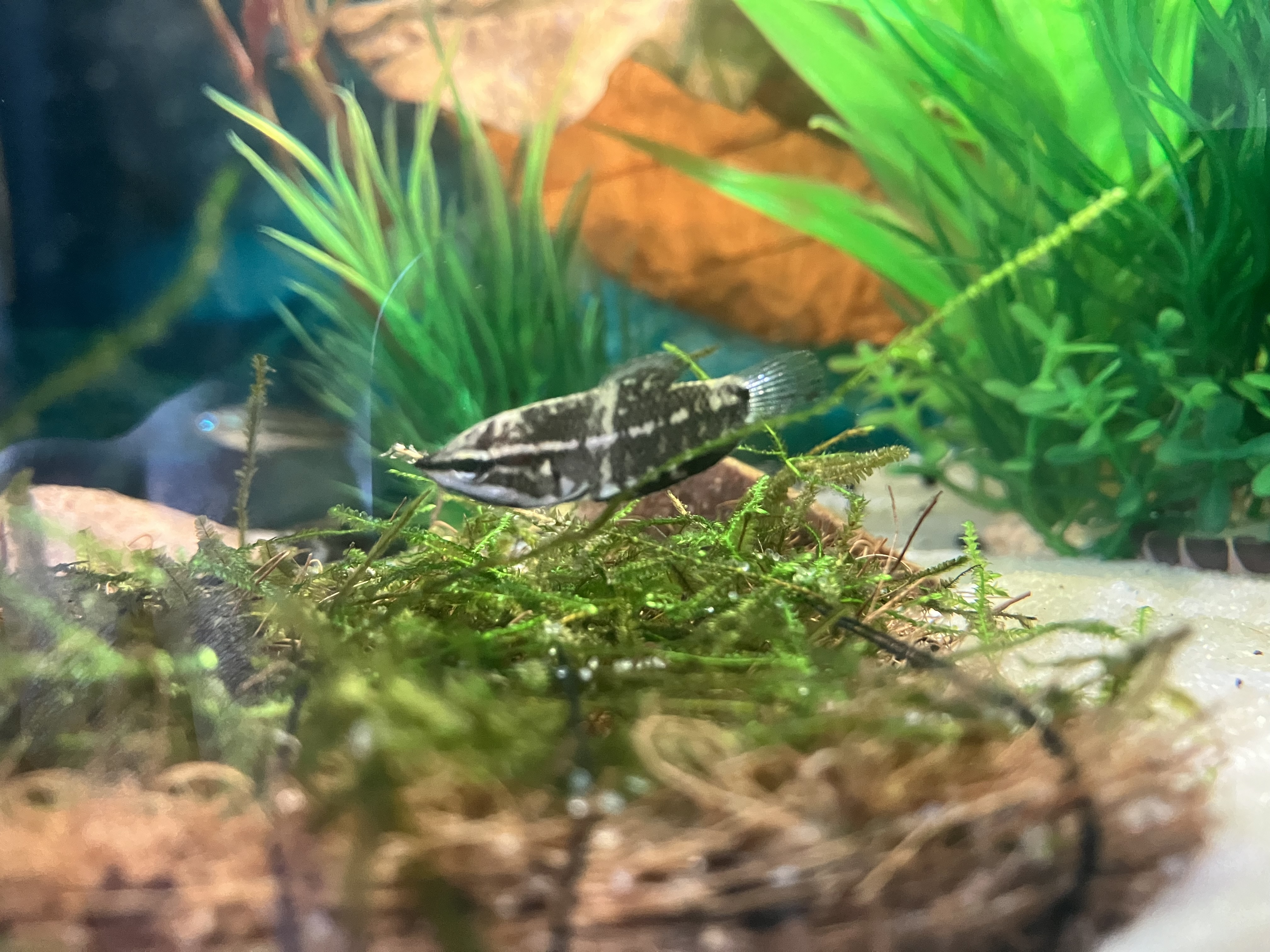

This species is rarely seen in the aquarium trade, and is usually stocked from specialist breeders or in smaller local fish stores.

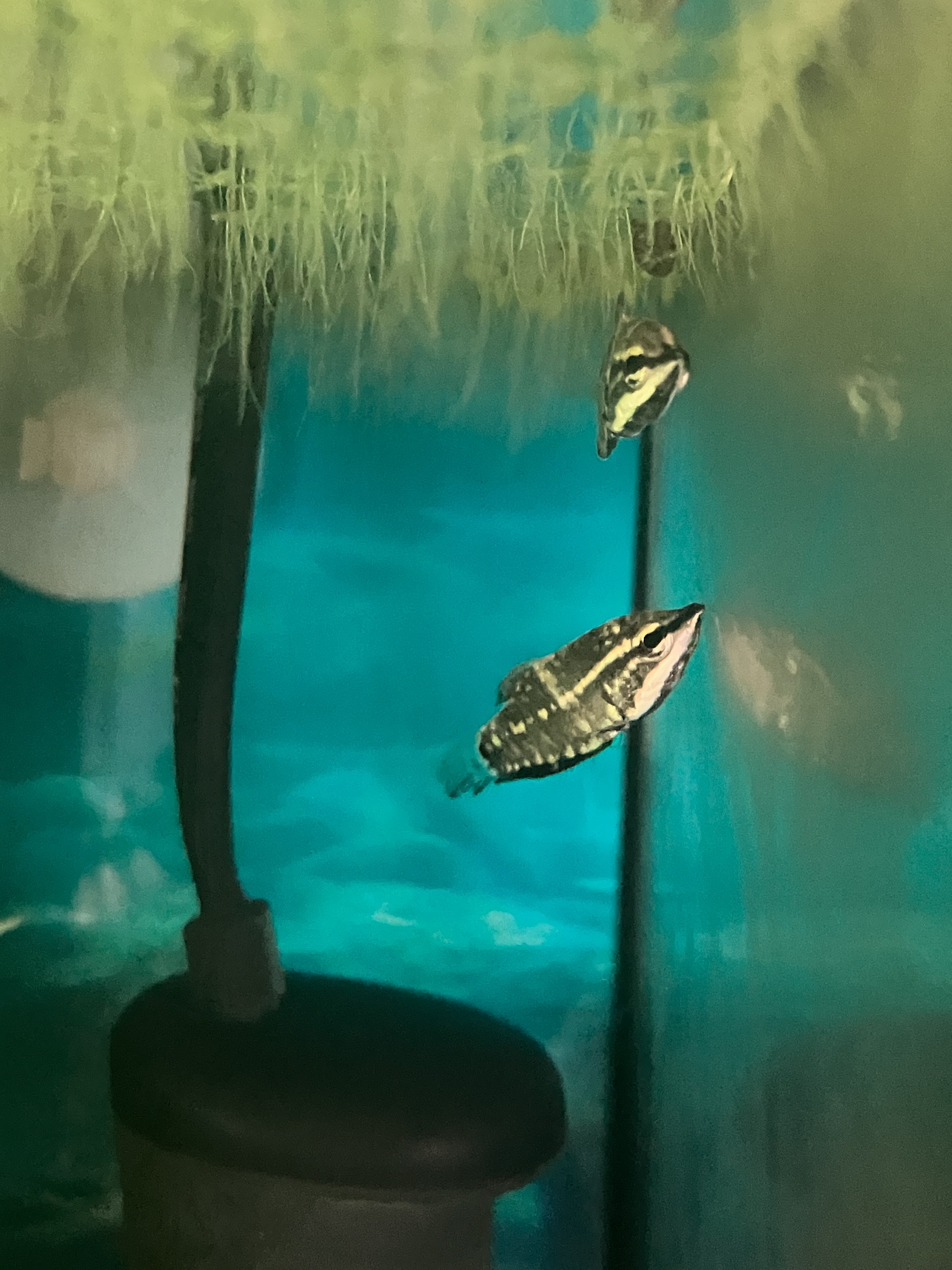

When found, it usually requires a 10+ gallon aquarium that has a PH of 3.5-6.8, and is decorated with wood, botanicals, a sandy substrate, and tannin stained water. It needs soft and acidic water along with little flow which replicates its habitat. It is an omnivore eating plant and algae matter along with small creatures such as daphnia and worms. The fry can use the diatoms from the decay of plant matter as a secondary food source. This species is somewhat sensitive to ammonia, nitrites, and nitrates as in is habitat, the constant rain constantly purifies the water. However, these fish like stable water chemistry so water changes should be at the most 10–15%. They are also sensitive to bacteria in the water column. This means that peat-filtration is recommended. The antibacterial properties of tannins in botanicals which are common in the Kapuas river keep it pure, even though muddy waters make up most of the river. When they are in the aquarium, a group of 6+ is recommended for them to create a pecking order and even a society. These intelligent fish are very peaceful and inquisitive at their surroundings. They must be fed with live foods as they will refuse processed foods. Only when you are able to wean them off the live foods can you get them to eat processed foods with the live foods given once every other few days to boost their health. This species however, is susceptible to disease.

== Gallery ==
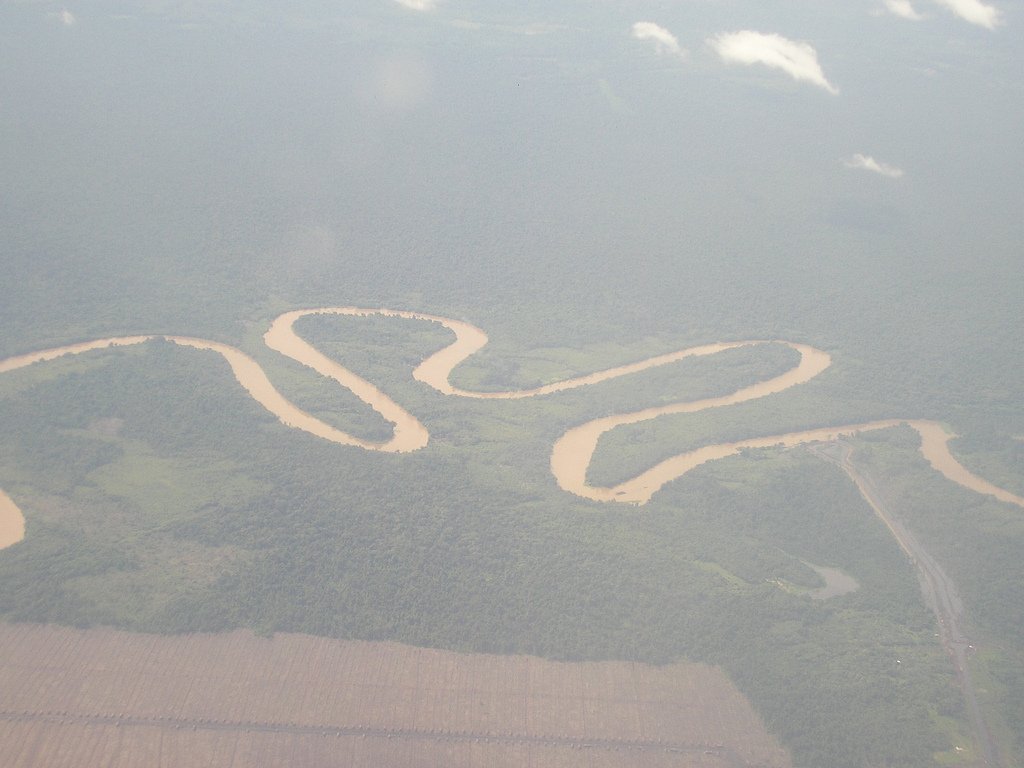
Aerial view of Kapuas river

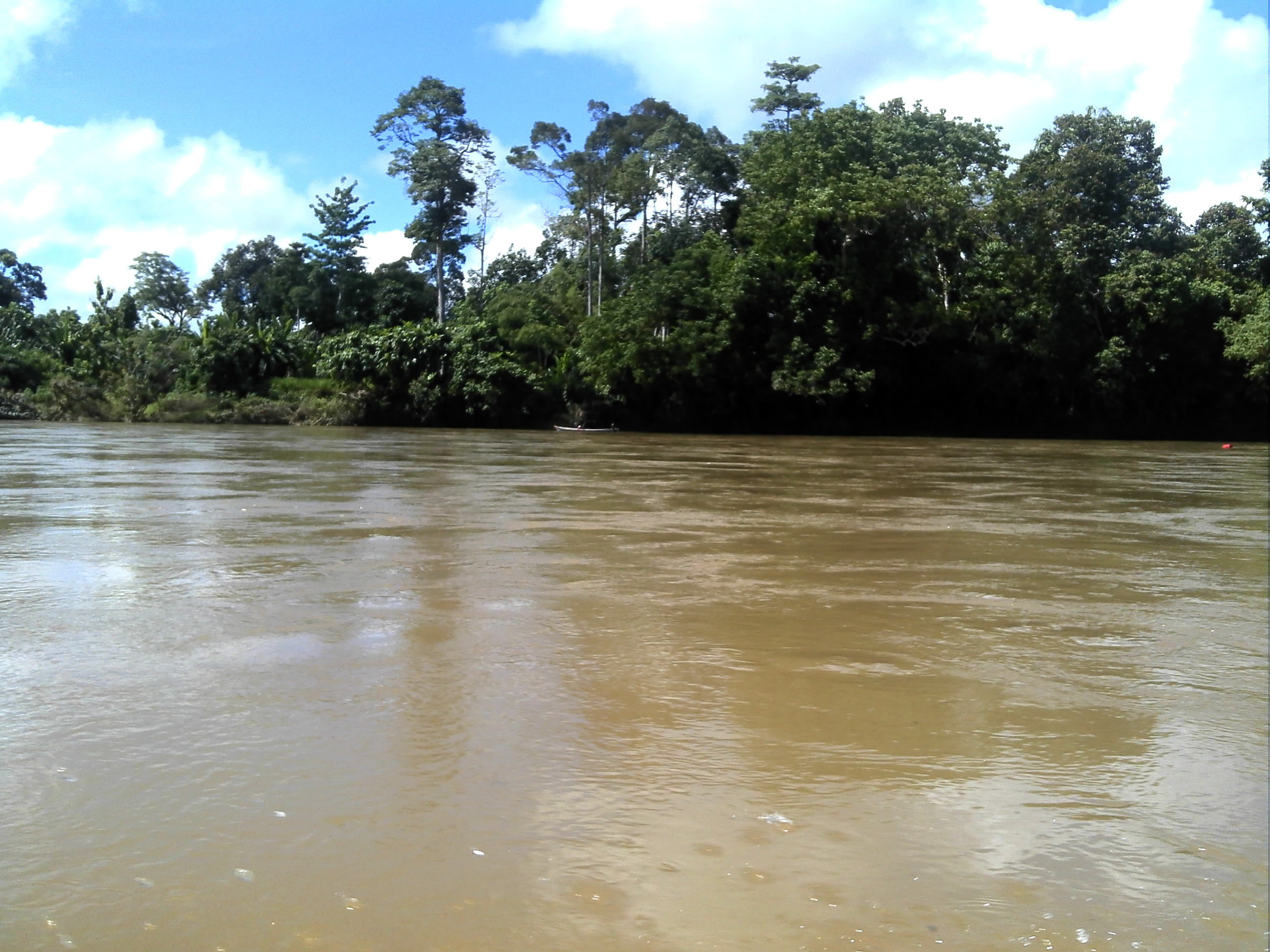
Kapuas River

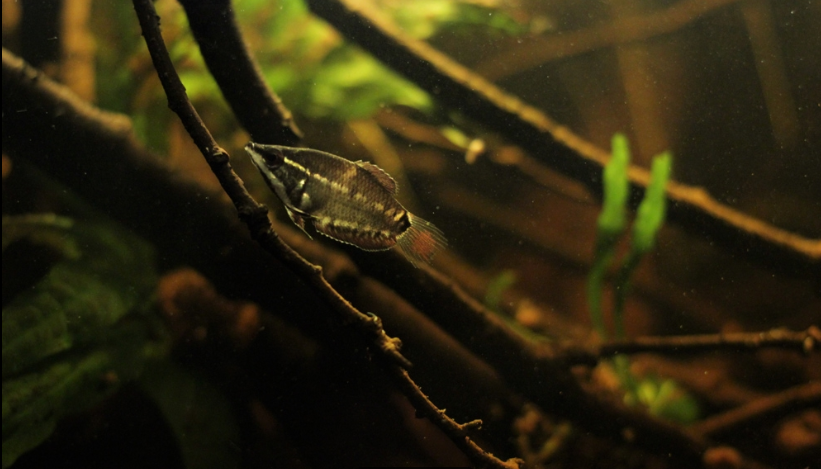
Camouflage of Samurai Gourami in habitat

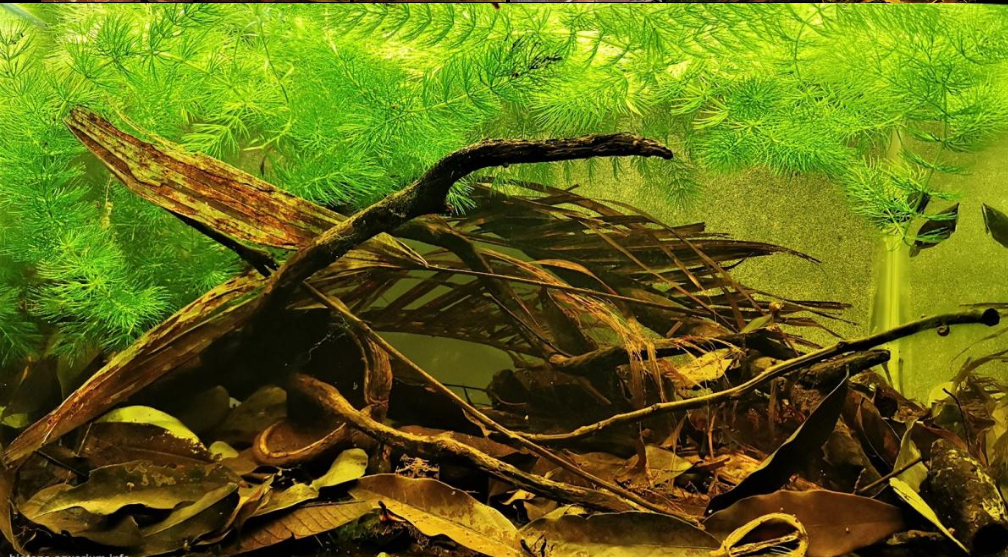
Riverbed habitat

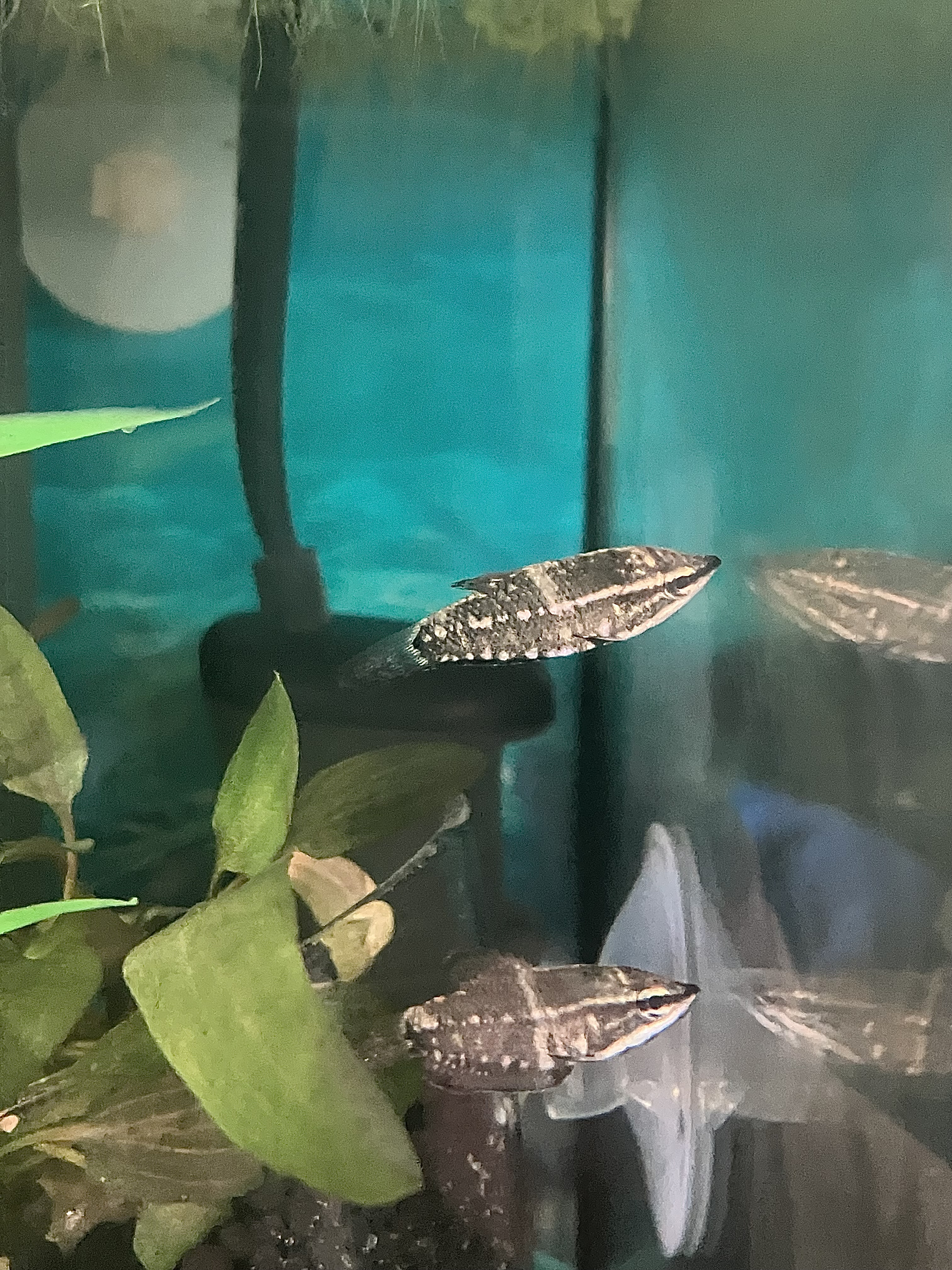
A pair near a cryptocoryne

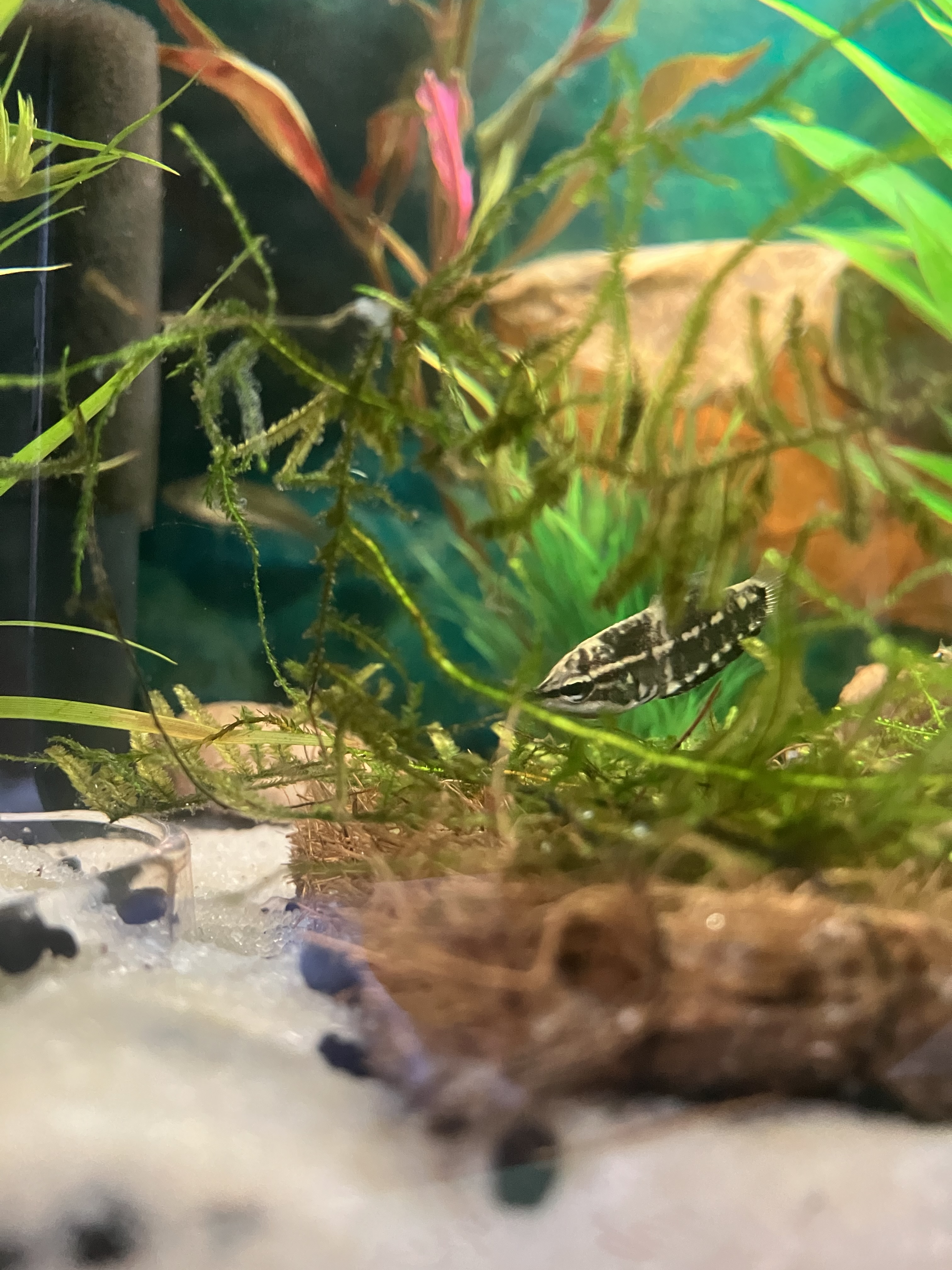
Specimen behind Java moss

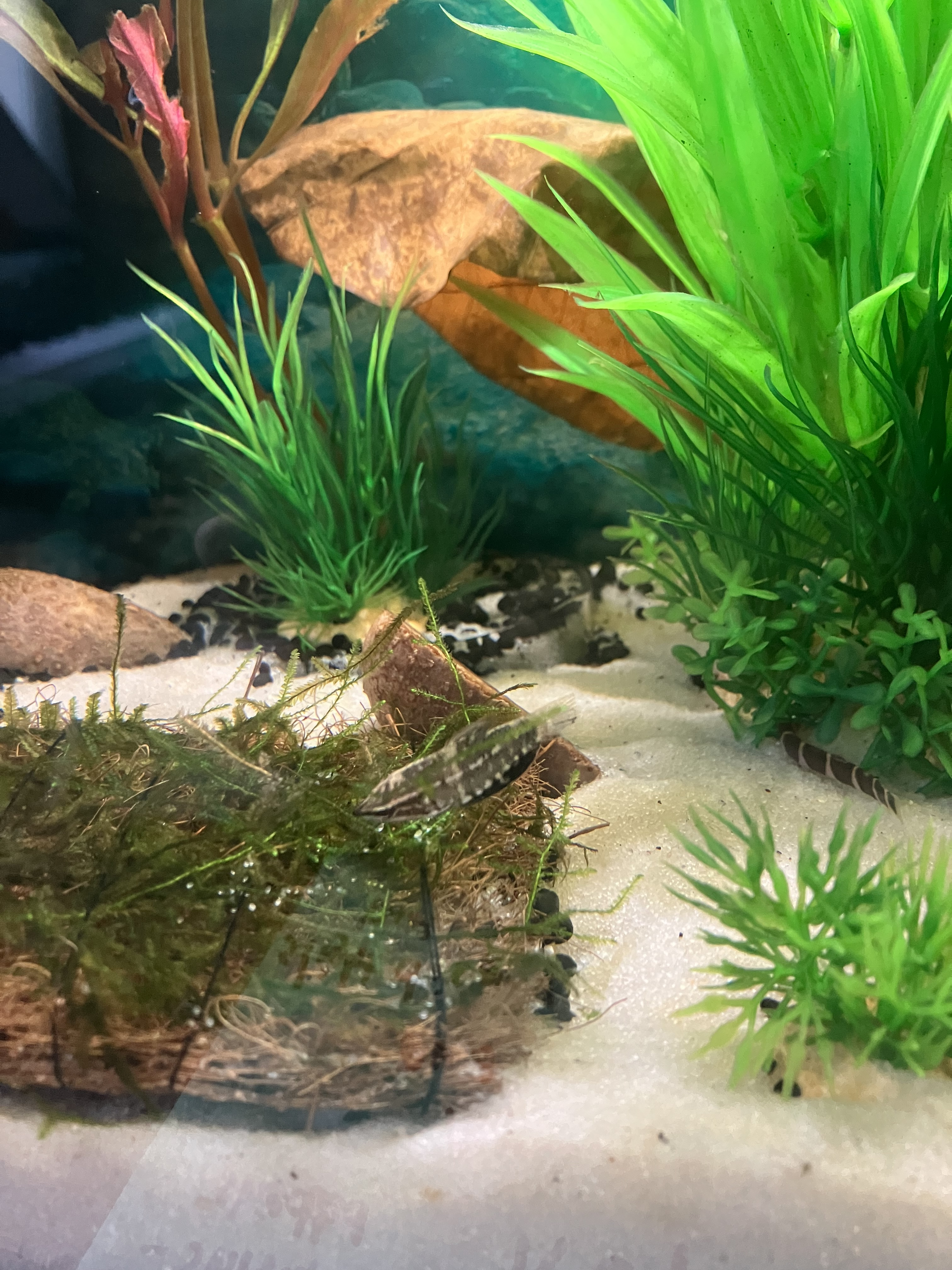
Samurai gourami in aquarium

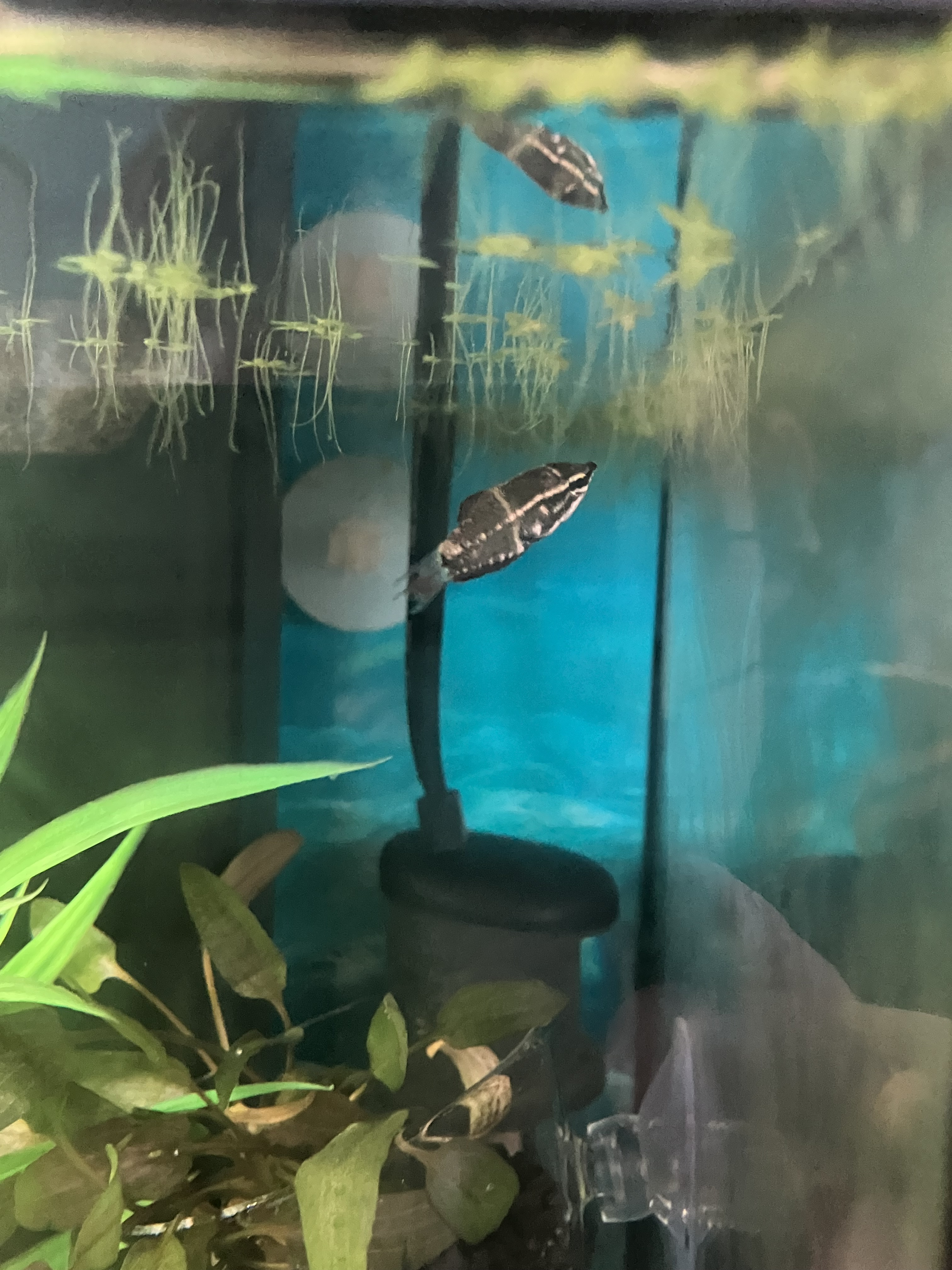
Specimen near corner surface of aquarium

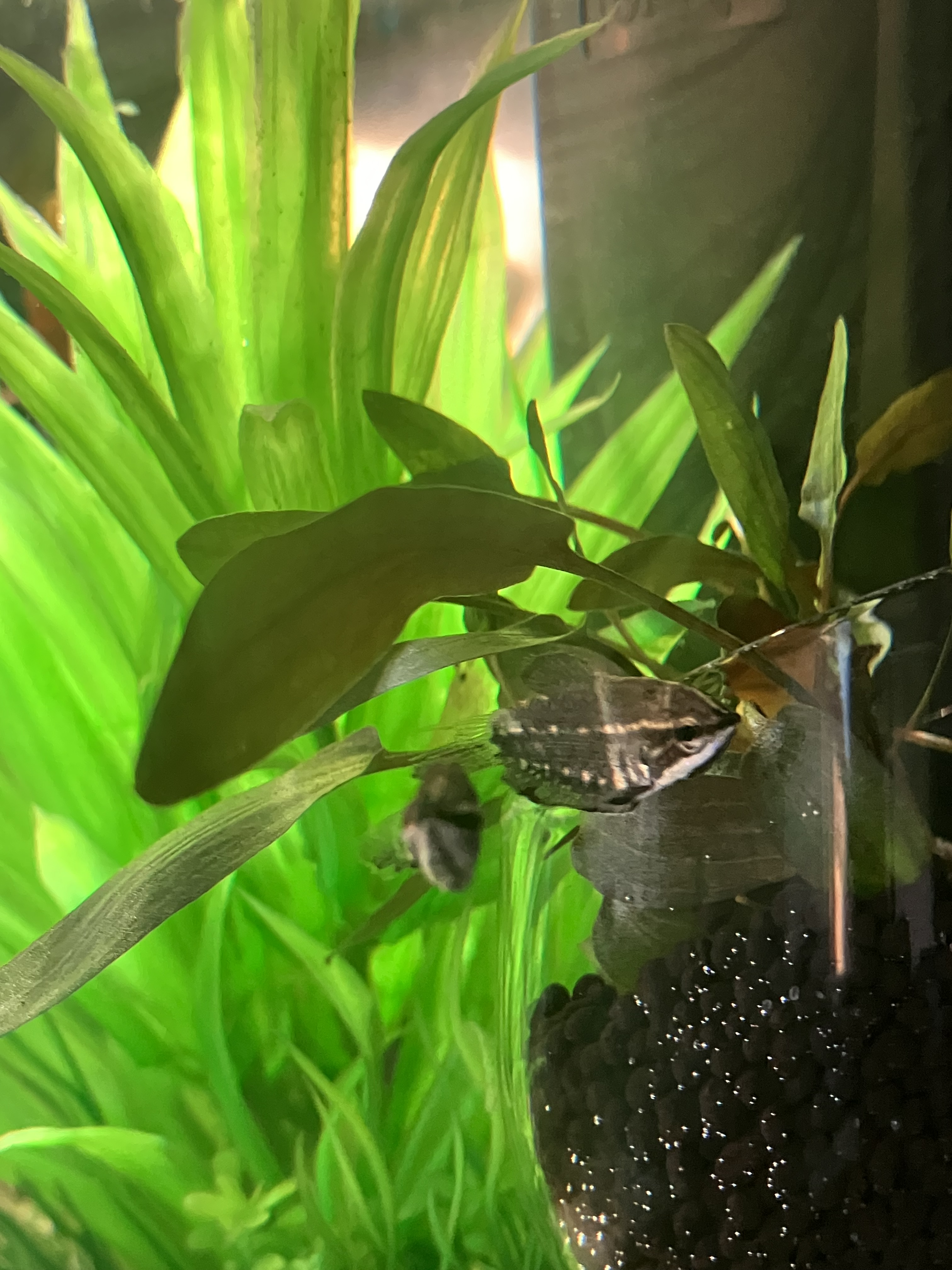
Pair underneath cryptocoryne
