= Chuna =

Chuna may refer to:

- Chuna (river), a tributary of the Taseyeva in Irkutsk Oblast and Krasnoyarsk Krai in Russia
- Chuna, a village in Tawang district of Arunachal Pradesh state of India
- Chuna or choona, an Indian term for calcium hydroxide chemical compound used as digestive aid
- Chuna, a medical practice in Korean traditional medicine, known in Chinese as tui na
- Honey gourami (Trichogaster chuna), a species of gourami fish native to India and Bangladesh

== See also ==
- Chunar
