= Sphaerichthys acrostoma =

Conservation status
- Vulnerable (IUCN 3.1)

Scientific classification
- Kingdom: Animalia
- Phylum: Chordata
- Class: Actinopterygii
- Order: Anabantiformes
- Family: Osphronemidae
- Genus: Sphaerichthys
- Species: S. acrostoma

Binomial name
- Sphaerichthys acrostoma Vierke, 1979

Species of fish

Sphaerichthys acrostoma, sometimes known as the giant chocolate gourami, is a species of gourami. It is native to Asia, where it is known only from the Kalimantan region of Borneo in Indonesia. The species reaches 4.6 cm (1.8 inches) in standard length, although some sources report a maximum standard length of 7 cm (2.8 inches). It is known to be a facultative air-breather, and females of the species exhibit mouthbrooding.
