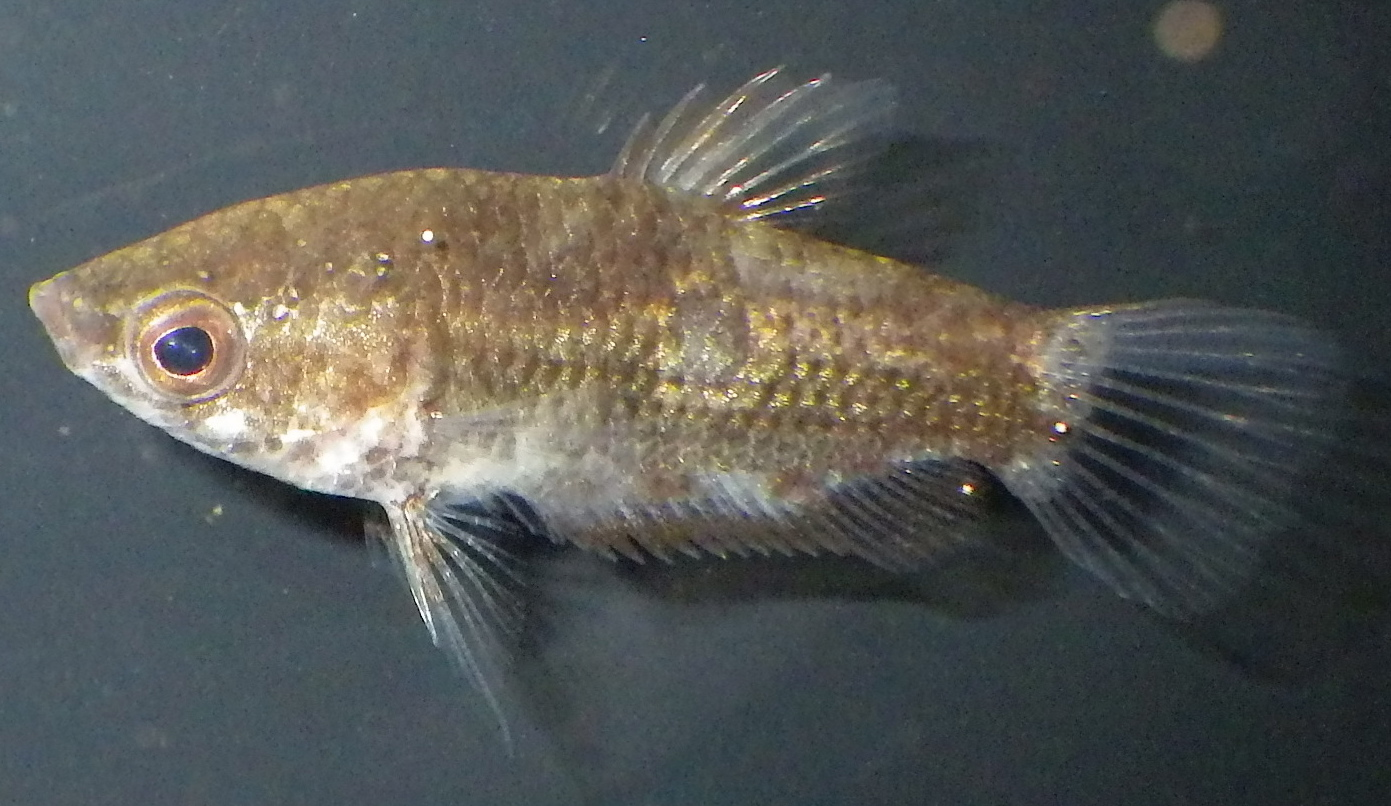

Conservation status
- Least Concern (IUCN 3.1)

Scientific classification
- Kingdom: Animalia
- Phylum: Chordata
- Class: Actinopterygii
- Order: Anabantiformes
- Family: Osphronemidae
- Genus: Parasphaerichthys
- Species: P. ocellatus

Binomial name
- Parasphaerichthys ocellatus Prashad & Mukerji, 1929

Synonyms
- Paraspherichthys ocellatus

= Eyespot gourami =

Species of fish

The eyespot gourami (Parasphaerichthys ocellatus) is a species of gourami endemic to Myanmar where it occurs in small, muddy streams and well vegetated shores of lakes. The species reaches 5 cm (2 inches) in standard length.
