= Parasphaerichthys lineatus =

Scientific classification
- Kingdom: Animalia
- Phylum: Chordata
- Class: Actinopterygii
- Order: Anabantiformes
- Family: Osphronemidae
- Genus: Parasphaerichthys
- Species: P. lineatus

Binomial name
- Parasphaerichthys lineatus Britz & Kottelat, 2002

Species of fish

Parasphaerichthys lineatus is a species of gourami. It is native to Asia, where it is known only from southern Myanmar. The species reaches 1.9 cm (0.7 inches) in standard length and is known to be a facultative air-breather. Observations of the species in captivity suggest that males pick up released eggs and store them in nests adhered to the corners of small stones.
