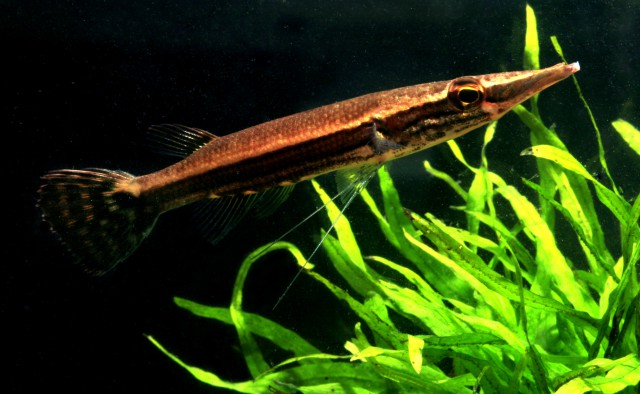
- Luciocephalus pulcher

Scientific classification
- Kingdom: Animalia
- Phylum: Chordata
- Class: Actinopterygii
- Division: Teleostei
- Order: Anabantiformes
- Family: Osphronemidae
- Subfamily: Luciocephalinae; Bleeker, 1852

= Luciocephalinae =

Subfamily of fishes

Luciocephalinae is a subfamily of the gourami family Osphronemidae. The members of this subfamily differ from the other groups within the gourami family by having a reduced number of rays supporting the branchiostegal membrane, five rather than six, and in the possession of a median process of the basioccipital which reaches the first vertebra and which has an attachment to the Baudelot's ligament.

== Genera ==
The fifth edition of Fishes of the World places five genera and thirteen species in the subfamily Luciocephalinae, other authorities place one or two other genera in the subfamily but Fishes of the World treats these under a separate subfamily, the Trichogastrinae. The genera within the Luciocephalinae are:

- Luciocephalus (Bleeker, 1851)
- Sphaerichthys (Canestrini, 1860)
- Ctenops (McClelland, 1845)
- Parasphaerichthys (Prashad & Mukerji, 1929)
- Trichopodus (Lacépède, 1801)
