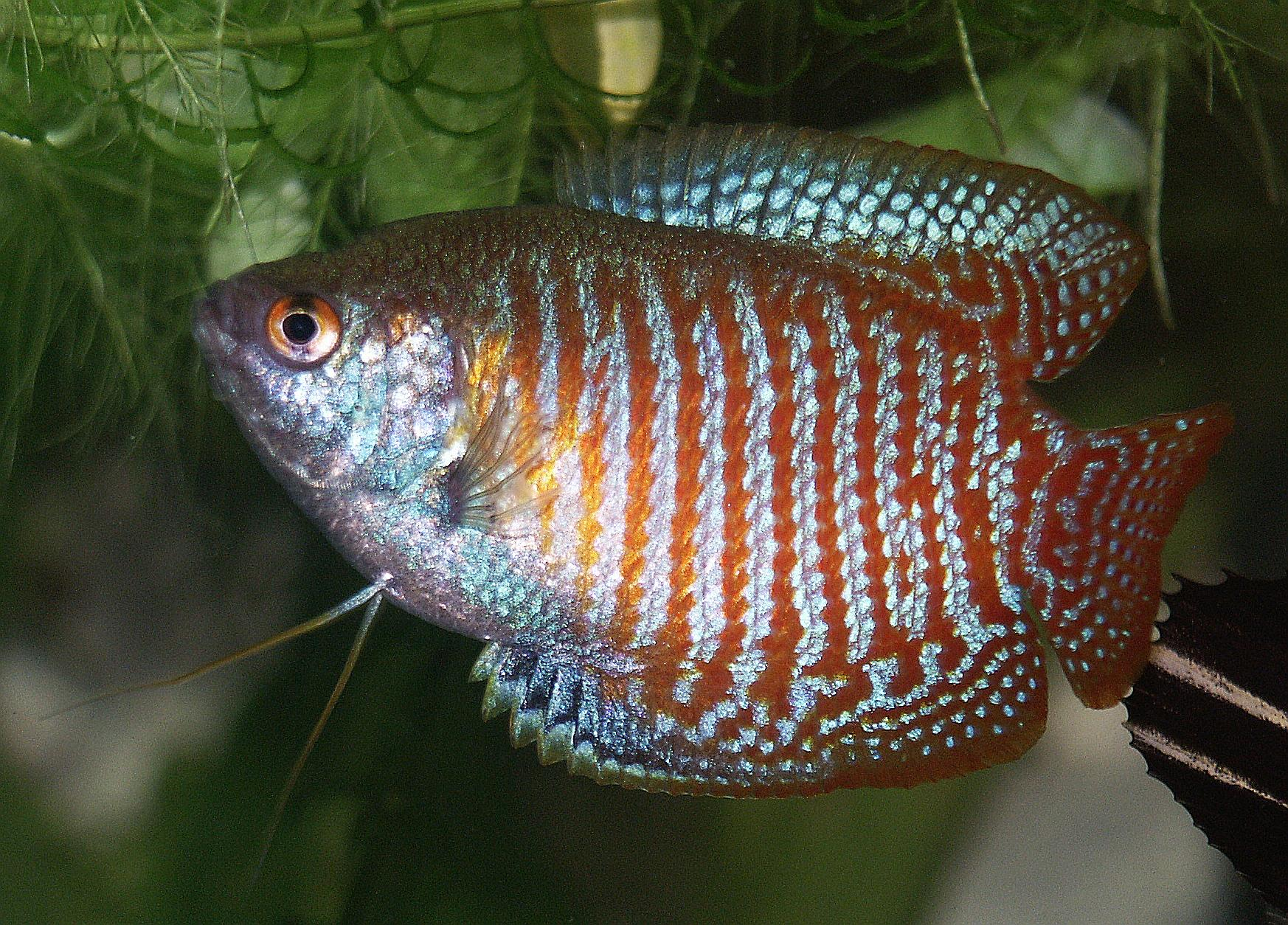
- Dwarf gourami (T. lalius)

Scientific classification
- Domain: Eukaryota
- Kingdom: Animalia
- Phylum: Chordata
- Class: Actinopterygii
- Order: Anabantiformes
- Family: Osphronemidae
- Subfamily: Trichogastrinae; Bleeker, 1879
- Genus: Trichogaster; Bloch & J. G. Schneider, 1801

Type species
- Trichogaster fasciata Bloch & J. G. Schneider, 1801

Synonyms
- Colisa Cuvier, 1831; Polyacanthus Cuvier, 1829

= Trichogaster =

Genus of fishes

Trichogaster is a genus of gouramis native to South Asia from Pakistan to Myanmar. It is the only genus in the monotypic subfamily Trichogastrinae as set out in the 5th Edition of Fishes of the World, although that book states that there are two genera, the other being Colisa which is treated as a synonym of Trichogaster by Fishbase and the Catalog of Fishes. Fishbase also places the genus in the Luciocephalinae. Species of this genus are very popular in the aquarium trade.

== Etymology ==
The name Trichogaster comes from the Ancient Greek words θρίξ (thríx) which means hair and Ancient Greek γαστήρ (gastḗr) which means stomach, a reference to the single long, hair-like ray in their pelvic fins.

== Species ==
There are currently four recognized species in this genus:

- Trichogaster chuna (F. Hamilton, 1822) (Honey gourami)
- Trichogaster fasciata Bloch & J. G. Schneider, 1801 (Banded gourami)
- Trichogaster labiosa F. Day, 1877 (Thick-lipped gourami)
- Trichogaster lalius (F. Hamilton, 1822) (Dwarf gourami)
