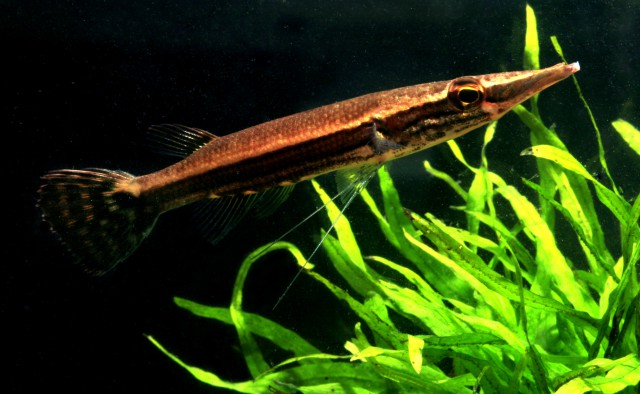
- Luciocephalus pulcher

Scientific classification
- Kingdom: Animalia
- Phylum: Chordata
- Class: Actinopterygii
- Division: Teleostei
- Order: Anabantiformes
- Family: Osphronemidae
- Subfamily: Luciocephalinae
- Genus: Luciocephalus; Bleeker, 1851

Type species
- Diplopterus pulcher J. E. Gray, 1830
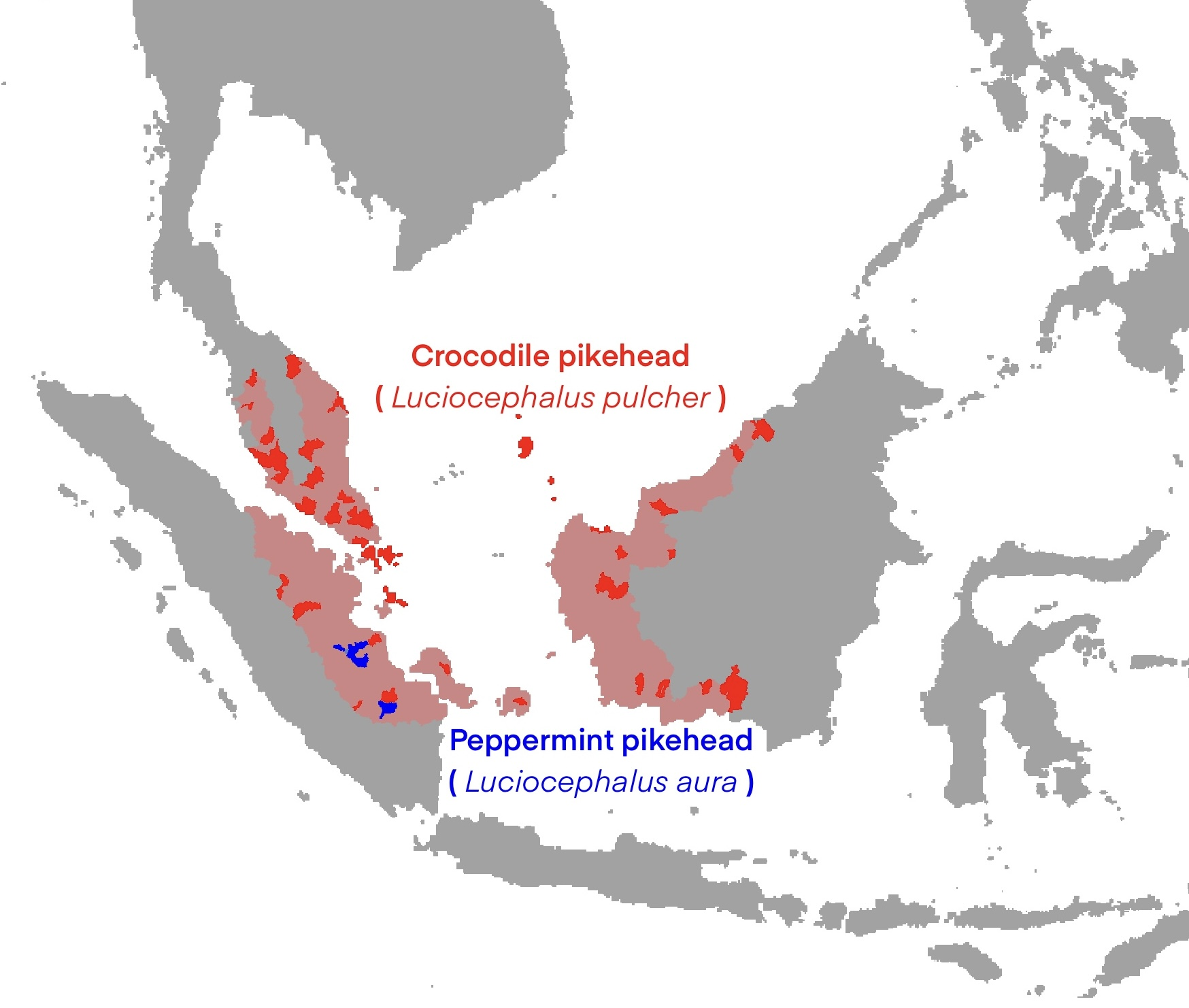

Synonyms
- Diplopterus J. E. Gray, 1830 (Preoccupied)

= Luciocephalus =

Genus of fishes

Luciocephalus is a genus of gouramies native to Southeast Asia. Both are extremely specialized niche predators native to parts of Thailand, Malaysia, Indonesia and Brunei Darussalam; in addition, both species - like a number of other osphronemid genera - are paternal mouthbrooders.

== Species ==
There are currently two recognized species in this genus:

- Luciocephalus aura H. H. Tan & P. K. L. Ng, 2005
- Luciocephalus pulcher (J. E. Gray, 1830) (Pikehead)
