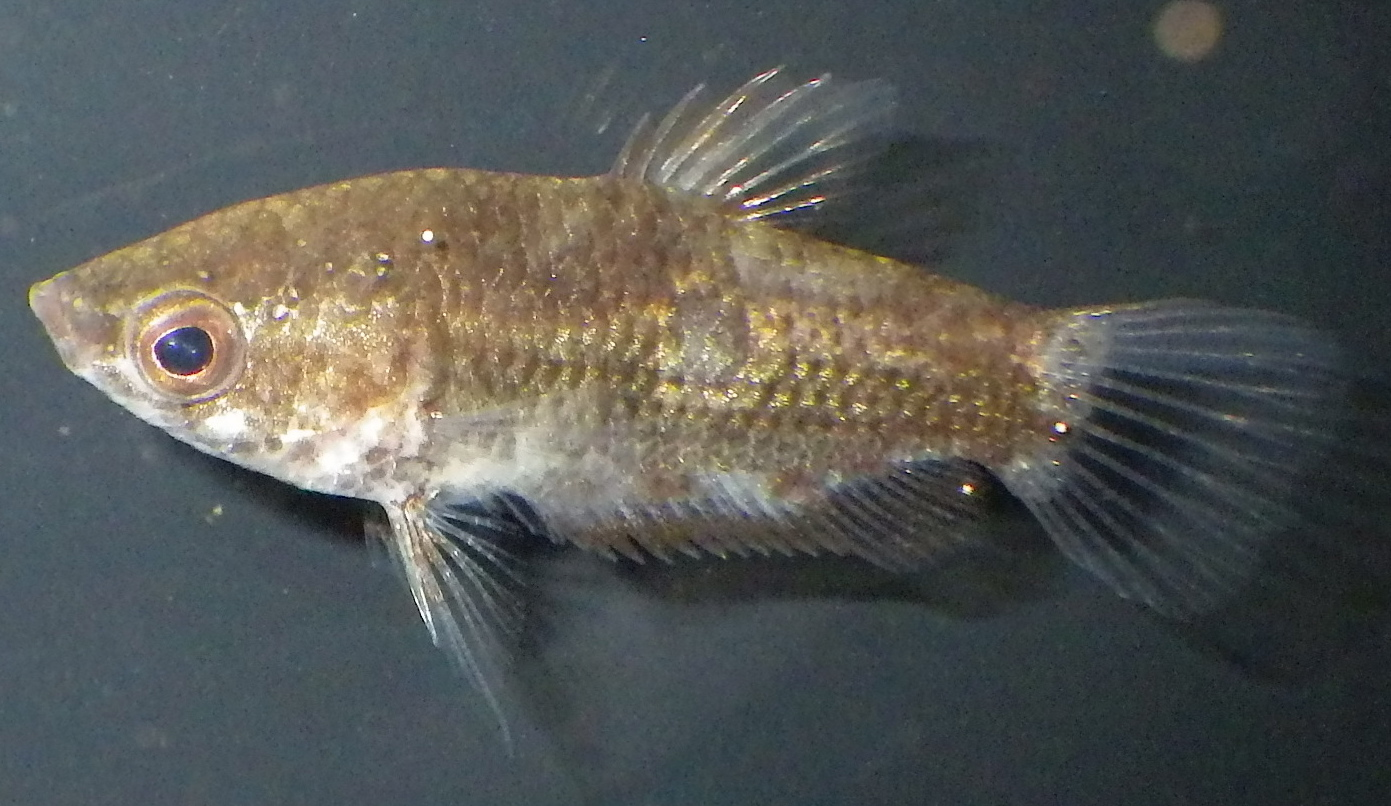
- Parasphaerichthys ocellatus

Scientific classification
- Domain: Eukaryota
- Kingdom: Animalia
- Phylum: Chordata
- Class: Actinopterygii
- Order: Anabantiformes
- Family: Osphronemidae
- Subfamily: Luciocephalinae
- Genus: Parasphaerichthys; Prashad & Mukerji, 1929

Type species
- Parasphaerichthys ocellatus Prashad & Mukerji, 1929

= Parasphaerichthys =

Genus of fishes

Parasphaerichthys is a genus of gouramies known only from streams and freshwater pools in the Irrawaddy basin of Myanmar. They are the small gouramies that, depending on the exact species, reach up to 1.9–5 cm (0.7–2.0 in) in length.

== Species ==
There are currently two recognized species in this genus:

- Parasphaerichthys lineatus Britz & Kottelat, 2002
- Parasphaerichthys ocellatus Prashad & Mukerji, 1929 (Eyespot gourami)
