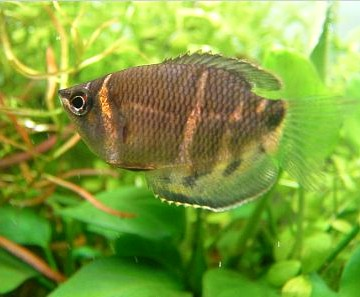
- Sphaerichthys osphromenoides

Scientific classification
- Domain: Eukaryota
- Kingdom: Animalia
- Phylum: Chordata
- Class: Actinopterygii
- Order: Anabantiformes
- Family: Osphronemidae
- Subfamily: Luciocephalinae
- Genus: Sphaerichthys; Canestrini, 1860

Type species
- Sphaerichthys osphromenoides Canestrini, 1860

= Sphaerichthys =

Genus of fishes

Sphaerichthys is a genus of gouramis native to Southeast Asia known as chocolate gourami. These species live mostly in blackwater rivers/swamps with acidic water. They have dark-light brownish hues with the exception being the female of S. vaillanti which can be dark reddish brown with green-dark blue/black stripes. They are shy fish that are hard to find because of their camouflage which when in action makes them look like a dead leaf floating along the river.

== Species ==
There are currently four recognized species in this genus:

- Sphaerichthys acrostoma Vierke, 1979 (Giant chocolate gourami)
- Sphaerichthys osphromenoides Canestrini, 1860 (Chocolate gourami)
- Sphaerichthys selatanensis Vierke, 1979 (Crossband chocolate gourami)
- Sphaerichthys vaillanti Pellegrin, 1930 (Valliant's chocolate gourami)

S. acrostoma, S. selatanesis, and S. vaillanti are found in Borneo (Kalimantan), while S. osphromenoides is found in Sumatra and Malaysia.
