= Sphaerichthys selatanensis =

Conservation status
- Near Threatened (IUCN 3.1)

Scientific classification
- Kingdom: Animalia
- Phylum: Chordata
- Class: Actinopterygii
- Order: Anabantiformes
- Family: Osphronemidae
- Genus: Sphaerichthys
- Species: S. selatanensis

Binomial name
- Sphaerichthys selatanensis Vierke, 1979

Synonyms
- Sphaerichthys osphronemoides selatanensis; Sphaerichthys osphromenoides selatanensis

Species of fish

Sphaerichthys selatanensis, sometimes known as the crossband chocolate gourami, is a species of gourami. It is native to Asia, where it occurs in the Kalimantan region of Borneo in Indonesia. The species reaches 4 cm (1.6 inches) in standard length. It is known to be a facultative air-breather, and males of the species exhibit mouthbrooding.
