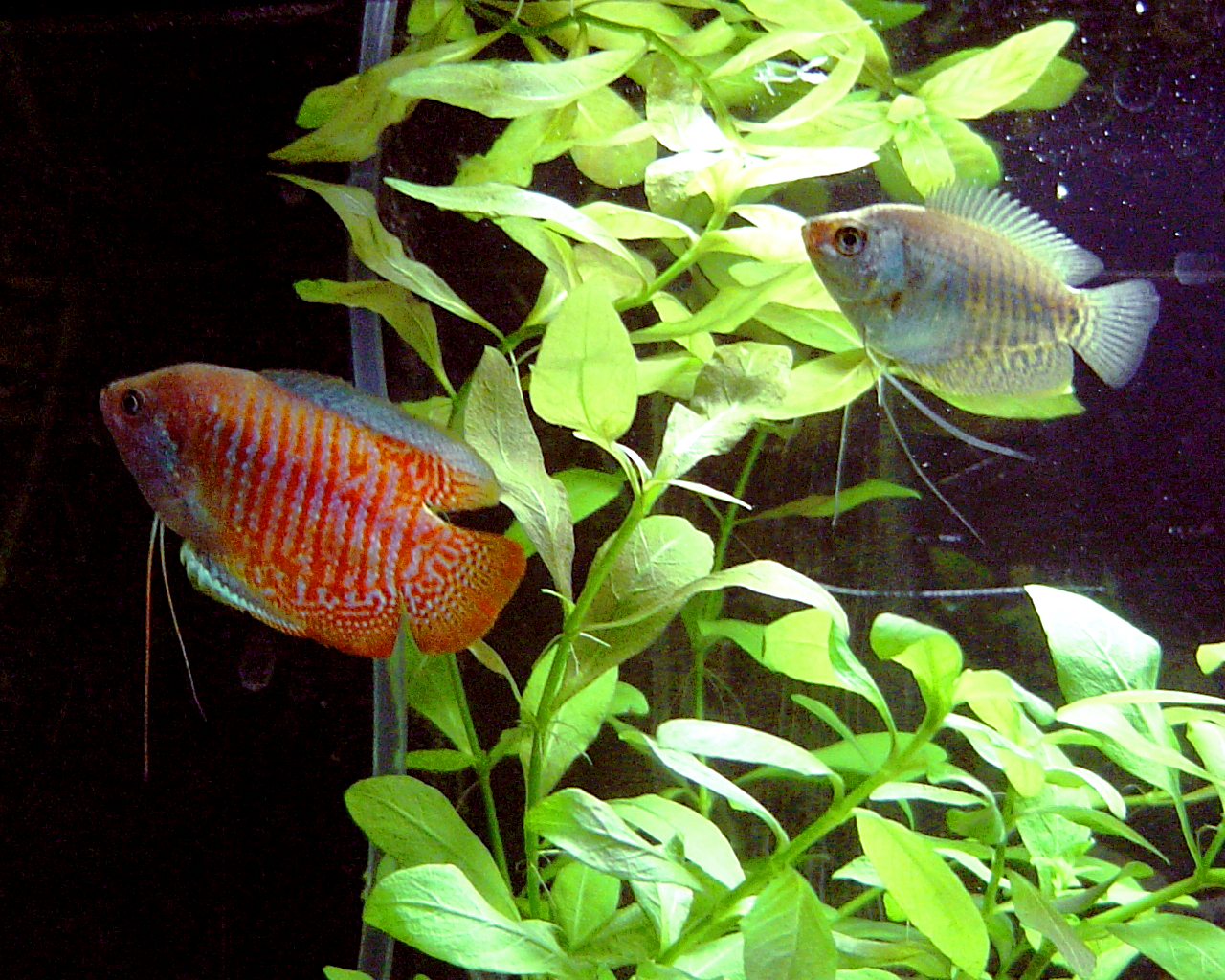
- Two specimens

Conservation status
- Least Concern (IUCN 3.1)

Scientific classification
- Kingdom: Animalia
- Phylum: Chordata
- Class: Actinopterygii
- Division: Teleostei
- Order: Anabantiformes
- Family: Osphronemidae
- Genus: Trichogaster
- Species: T. lalius

Binomial name
- Trichogaster lalius (F. Hamilton, 1822)
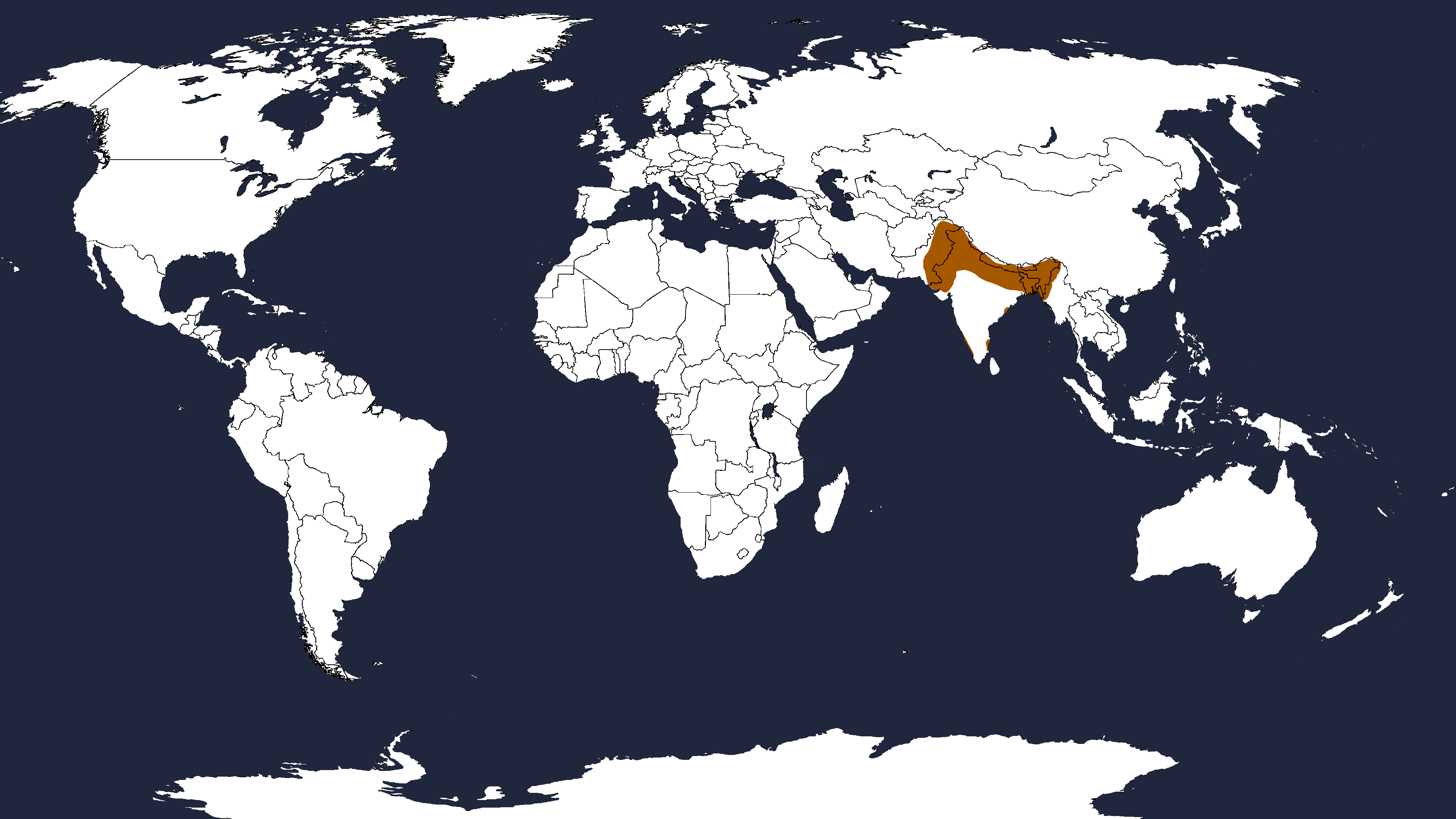

Synonyms
- Trichopodus lalius (F. Hamilton, 1822); Colisa lalia (F. Hamilton, 1822); Polyacanthus lalius (F. Hamilton, 1822); Colisa unicolor (G. Cuvier, 1831); Trichogaster fasciata (Knight et al., 2022)

= Dwarf gourami =

Species of fish

The dwarf gourami (Trichogaster lalius) is a species of gourami native to South Asia.

== Distribution and habitat ==
The dwarf gourami is native to Pakistan, India and Bangladesh. However, it has also been widely distributed outside of its native range. It inhabits slow-moving waters in rivulets, streams and lakes, occurring in areas with plentiful vegetation.

== Appearance and anatomy ==
This species can reach a length of 8.8 centimetres (3.5 in) TL. Male dwarf gouramis in the wild have diagonal stripes of alternating blue and red colors; females are a silvery color. Besides the difference in color, the sex can be determined by the dorsal fin. The male's dorsal fin is pointed, while the female's is rounded or curved. They carry touch-sensitive cells on their thread-like pelvic fins. Dwarf gouramis sold in fish stores may also be solid colors (e.g., powder blue dwarf gourami or red flame variety) which are nothing but captive bred color morphs of the same species.

Similar to the archerfish, the dwarf gourami can project a stream of water from its mouth to hunt prey above the surface, to a maximum distance of ~5 cm.

== Relationship with humans ==
=== Food ===
Before being introduced into the aquarium trade, the dwarf, along with the snakeskin gourami was and still is a popular food fish in its native range. In Bangladesh it is known as "Kholisha" and "Khosti" in India and "Kungee" in Punjab as well as different linguistic variants within its range.

=== In the aquarium ===
A female dwarf gourami with two males in an aquarium

Most dwarf gouramis live for about four to six years; with proper care, they can live longer. Dwarf gouramis are generally peaceful, but can be slightly territorial. They do well in most community aquariums.

Temperatures of 27 °C (81 °F) are easily tolerated.

Dwarf gouramis raised for aquarium trade in Singapore may carry dwarf gourami iridovirus. Recent research has shown that 22% of Singapore Trichogaster lalius carry this virus.

Dwarf gouramis are often confused with the closely related thick-lipped gouramis at a younger age and are sometimes sold together.

=== Nutrition ===
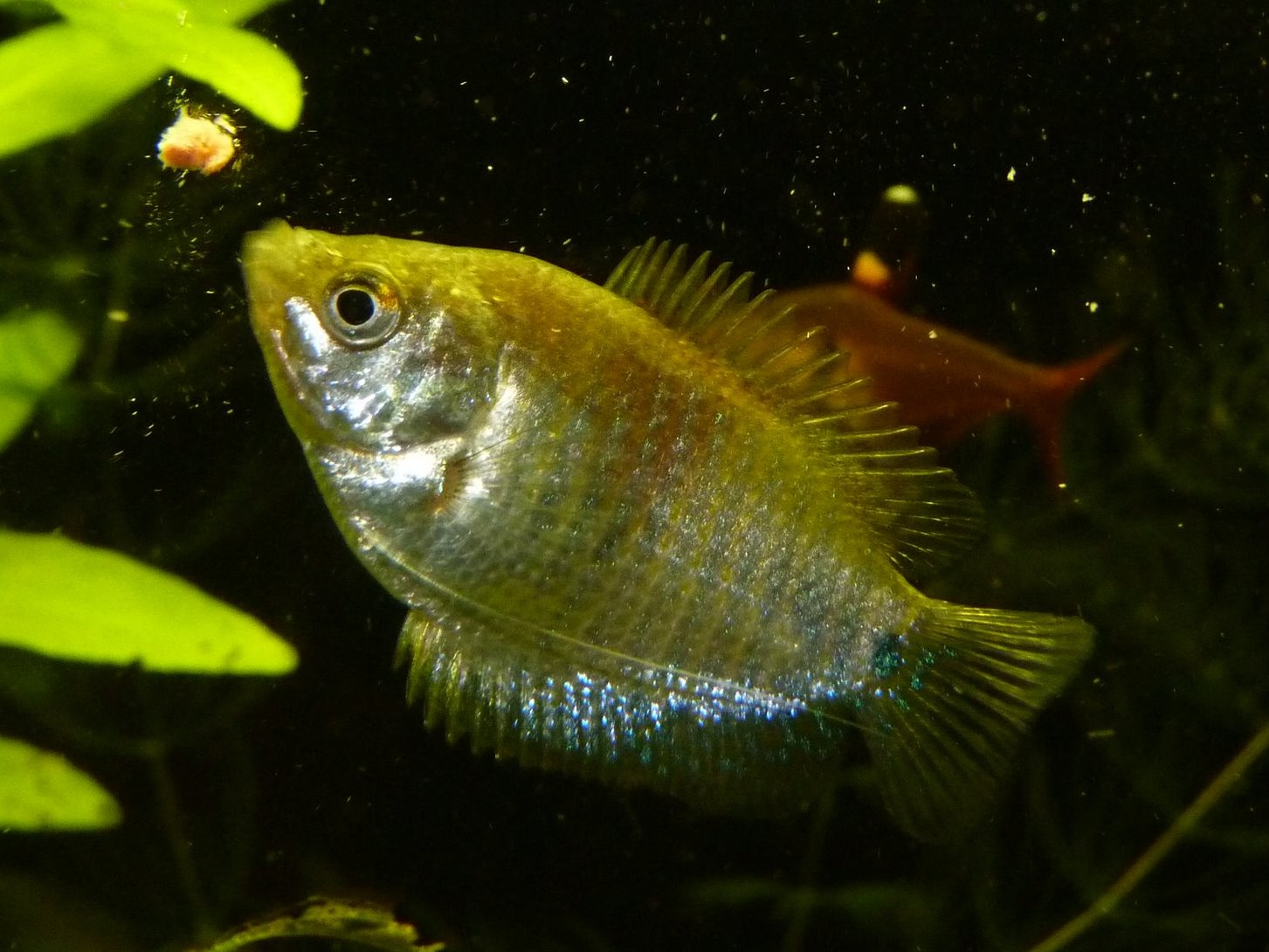
Female dwarf gourami feeding on commercial fish food

A varied diet is very important to the dwarf gourami, which is an omnivore that prefers both algae-based foods and meaty foods. An algae-based flake food, along with freeze-dried bloodworms, tubifex, and brine shrimp, will provide these fish with proper nutrition.

=== Breeding ===
The male builds a floating bubble nest in which the eggs are laid. Unlike other bubble nest builders, males will incorporate bits of plants, twigs, and other debris, which hold the nest together better. The water level should be reduced to 7–10 cm (3–4 in) during spawning, and the temperature should be approximately 28–30 °C (86 °F). Vegetation is essential, as males build their bubble nest using plant material, which they bind together with bubbles. Nests are very elaborate and sturdy, reaching several inches across and an inch deep. Limnophila aquatica, Riccia fluitans, Ceratopteris thalictroides, and Vesicularia dubyana, are good choices for the breeding tank. Peat fiber may also be offered as building material.

Once the nest has been built the male will begin courting the female, usually in the afternoon or evening. He signals his intentions by swimming around the female with flared fins, attempting to draw her to the nest where he will continue his courting display. If the female accepts the male she will begin swimming in circles with the male beneath the bubble nest. When she is ready to spawn she touches the male on either the back or the tail with her mouth. Upon this signal the male will embrace the female, turning her first on her side and finally on her back. At this point the female will release approximately five dozen clear eggs, which are immediately fertilized by the male. Most of the eggs will float up into the bubble nest. Eggs that stray are collected by the male and placed in the nest. Once all the eggs are secured in the nest, the pair will spawn again. If more than one female is present in the breeding tank, the male may spawn with all of them. The spawning sessions will continue for two to four hours, and produce between 300 and 800 eggs. Dwarf gouramis have a fecundity of about 600 eggs.[1] Upon completion, the male will place a fine layer of bubbles beneath the eggs, assuring that they remain in the bubble nest. The male will protect the eggs and fry. In 12 to 24 hours the fry will hatch, and continue developing within the protection of the bubble nest. After three days they are sufficiently developed to be free swimming and leave the nest. When the fry are two to three days old the male should also be removed or he may consume the young.

After spawning the female should be moved to a different tank. The male will now take sole responsibility for the eggs, aggressively defending the nest and surrounding territory. When first hatched, the tiny fry should be fed infusoria, and later, brine shrimp and finely ground flakes. Freeze-dried tablets may also be fed to older fry.

=== Colour variations ===
Breeders have created different colour variations, principally varying proportions of red and blue colouring. The powder blue variant is almost entirely bright blue. The reddest variety (flame red) can be confused with the red variety of honey gouramis (Trichogaster chuna). One of the most common color morphs is the turquoise / neon blue, featuring stripes of dark red and bright blue.

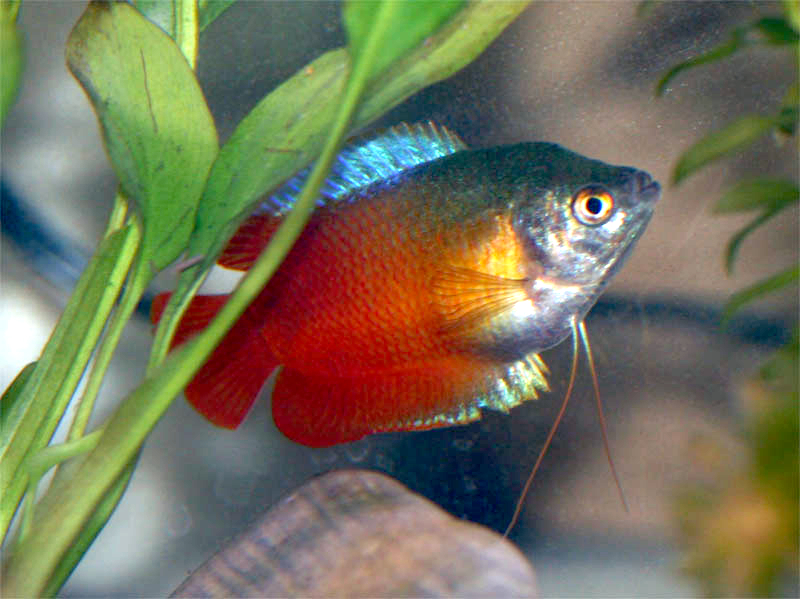
Flame red

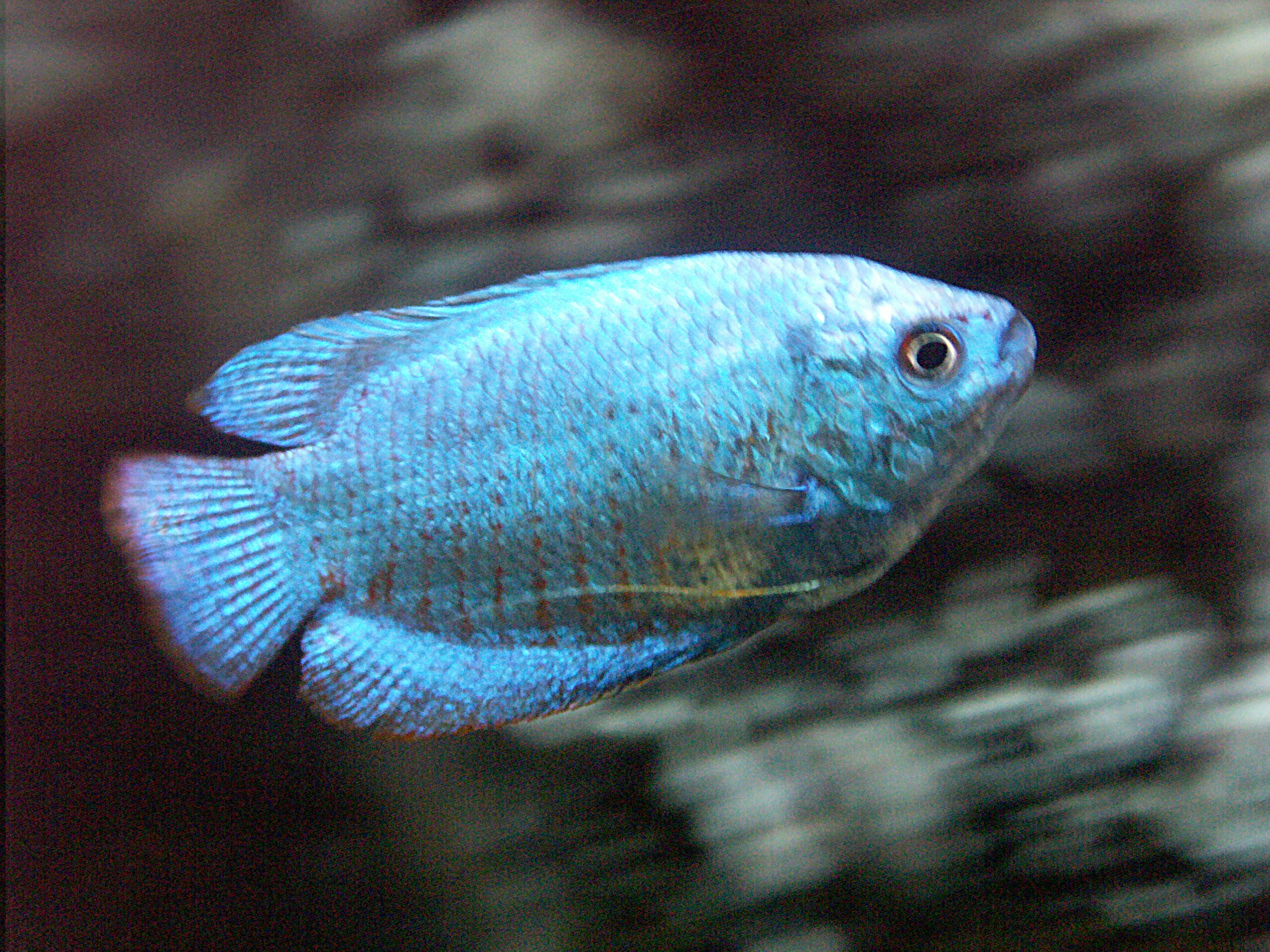
Powder blue

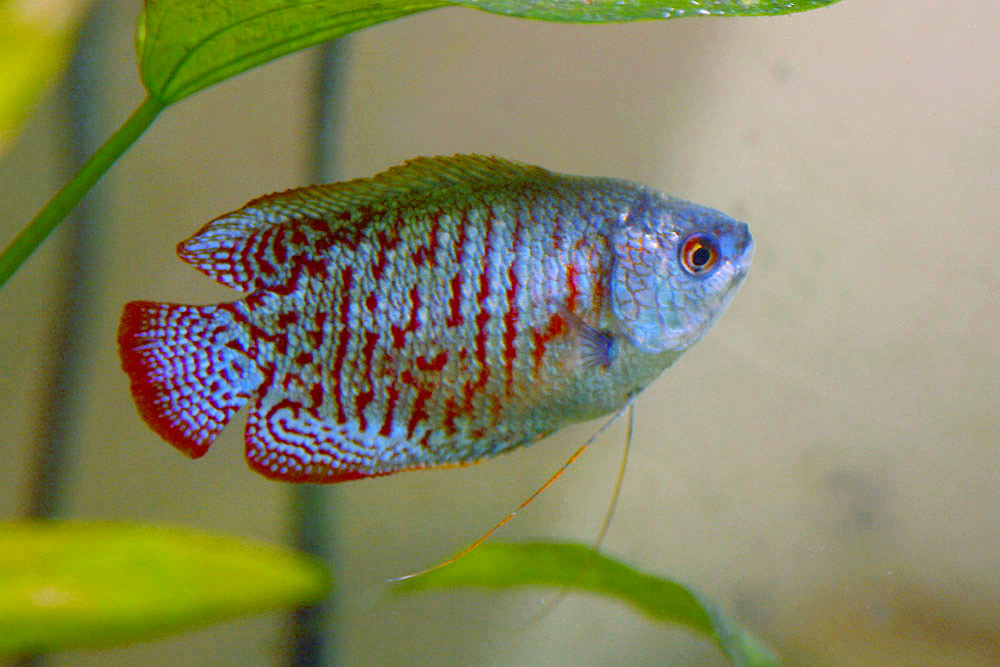
Turquoise / neon blue
