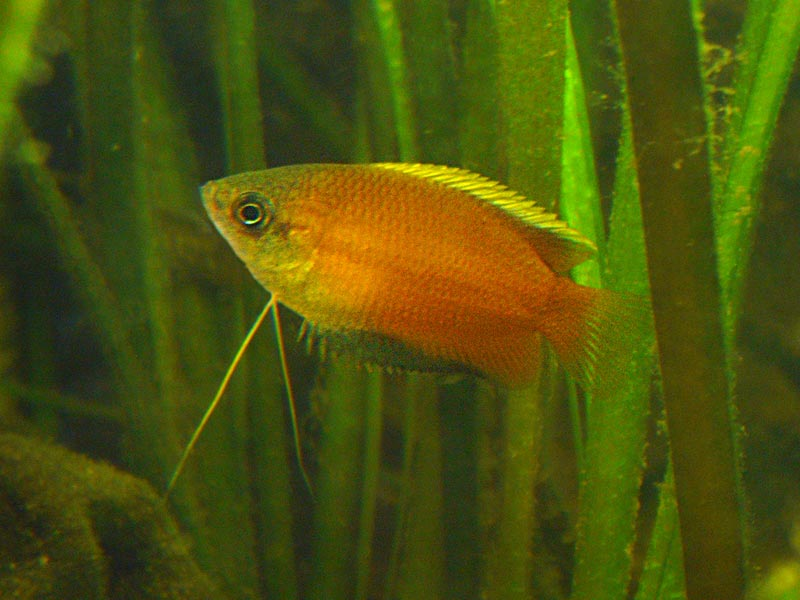

Conservation status
- Least Concern (IUCN 3.1)

Scientific classification
- Kingdom: Animalia
- Phylum: Chordata
- Class: Actinopterygii
- Division: Teleostei
- Order: Anabantiformes
- Family: Osphronemidae
- Genus: Trichogaster
- Species: T. chuna

Binomial name
- Trichogaster chuna (F. Hamilton, 1822)
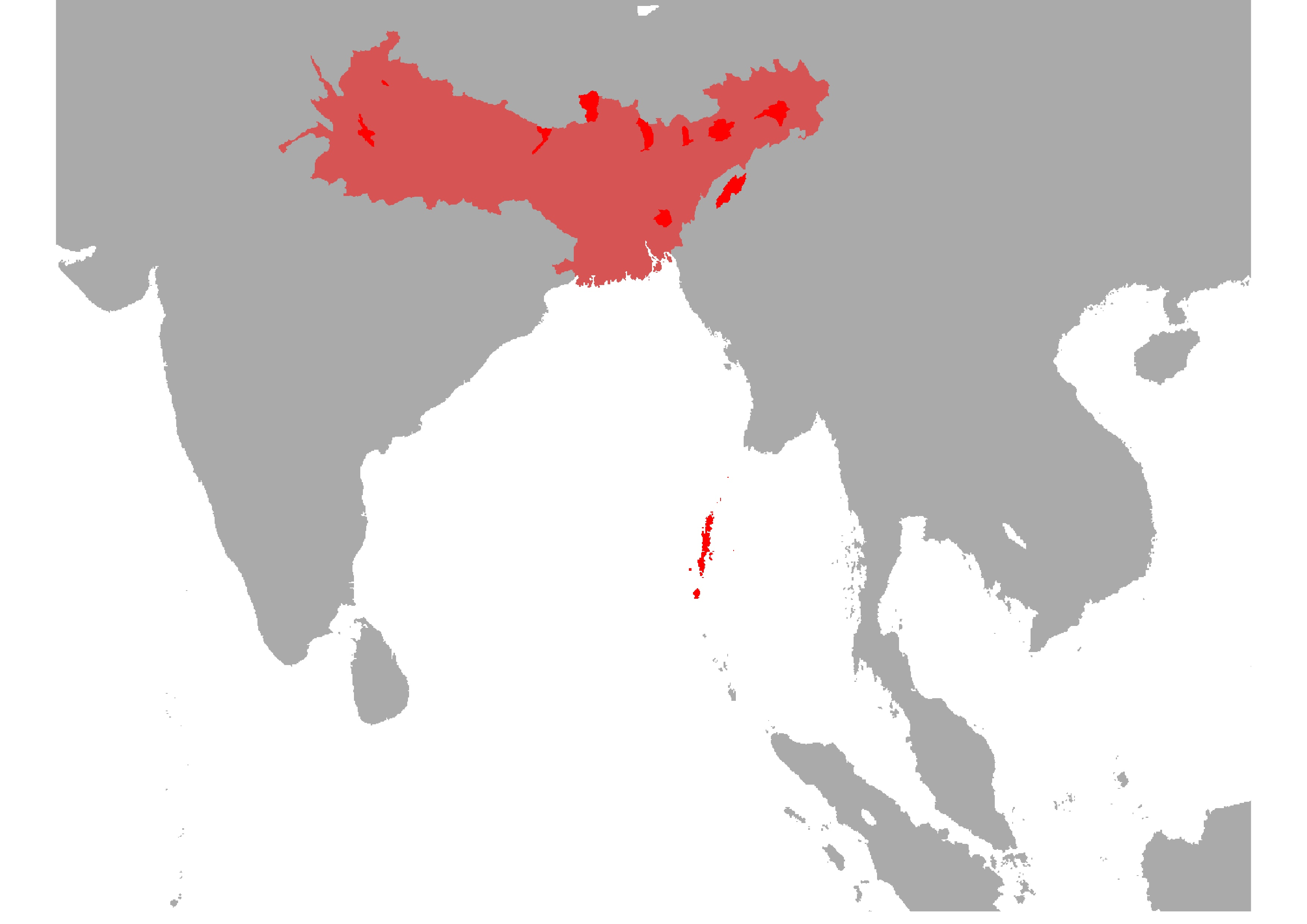
- Red: extant, Light red: possibly extant

Synonyms
- Trichopodus chuna F. Hamilton, 1822; Colisa chuna (F. Hamilton, 1822); Trichopodus sota F. Hamilton, 1822; Colisa sota (F. Hamilton, 1822); Polyacanthus sota (F. Hamilton, 1822)

= Honey gourami =

Species of fish

The honey gourami (Trichogaster chuna) is a species of gourami native to India and Bangladesh.

== Distribution and habitat ==
The honey gourami is typically found in rivers and lakes in its native range of India and Bangladesh. It inhabits areas of thick vegetation in soft and poorly mineralised waters. This fish prefers the top and middle levels of the water.

== Appearance and anatomy ==
They have orange-coloured bodies. This species can reach a length of 5.5 centimetres (2.2 in) TL. Male specimens of this fish, typical of many gouramis, are generally more colourful than their female counterparts. They exhibit bright orange colouring around the throat region, which at breeding time becomes much brighter and is used to court the female. The undersides of the males become black when breeding. Males also exhibit somewhat of an orange tinge in their fins, with the exception of the caudal fin. The male also has longer fins, with a pointed dorsal fin and extended anal fin rays.

== In the aquarium ==
The honey gourami is widely regarded as a peaceful community fish and is commonly kept in small freshwater aquaria. It is generally suitable for aquaria of modest size, although males may display territorial aggression toward one another, particularly in confined conditions. In larger, well-structured tanks, males may establish separate territories and coexist more successfully.

In captivity, the species is typically maintained in aquaria with dense vegetation and structural features that provide cover. This reflects its natural preference for sheltered environments and helps reduce stress, as honey gouramis can be relatively timid. They are best housed with small, non-aggressive species, including non-fin-nipping tetras and barbs, corydoras, platys, and other similarly sized fishes. Aggressive or highly active tankmates are generally avoided.

Honey gouramis are tolerant of a range of water conditions, provided extreme parameters are avoided. They are commonly maintained at temperatures between 22–28 °C (72–82 °F).

=== Breeding ===
Honey gouramis reproduce by means of bubble-nest spawning, a behaviour characteristic of many anabantoid fishes. During the breeding period, males construct floating nests composed of air bubbles, often incorporating plant material. Courtship involves increased coloration in the male, particularly around the throat and ventral region.

Spawning occurs when the male embraces the female beneath the nest, during which eggs are released and fertilized. The eggs sink initially but are collected by the male and placed into the bubble nest. Following spawning, the male assumes sole responsibility for guarding and maintaining the nest, while the female typically withdraws from the area. Eggs generally hatch within approximately two days, and the larvae become free-swimming several days later. In captivity, the early life stages have been observed to feed initially on microscopic food sources before transitioning to larger prey items as they develop.
