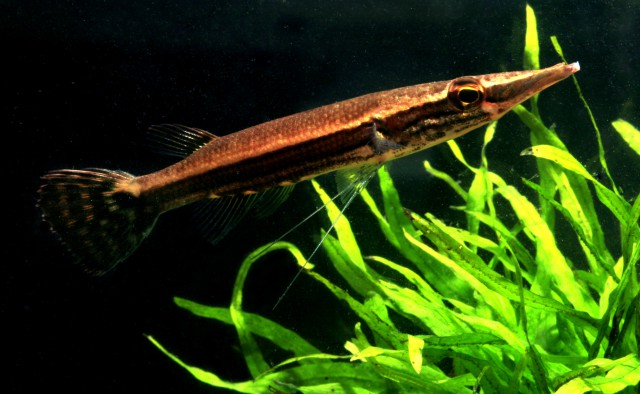

Conservation status
- Least Concern (IUCN 3.1)

Scientific classification
- Kingdom: Animalia
- Phylum: Chordata
- Class: Actinopterygii
- Order: Anabantiformes
- Family: Osphronemidae
- Genus: Luciocephalus
- Species: L. pulcher

Binomial name
- Luciocephalus pulcher (J. E. Gray, 1830)
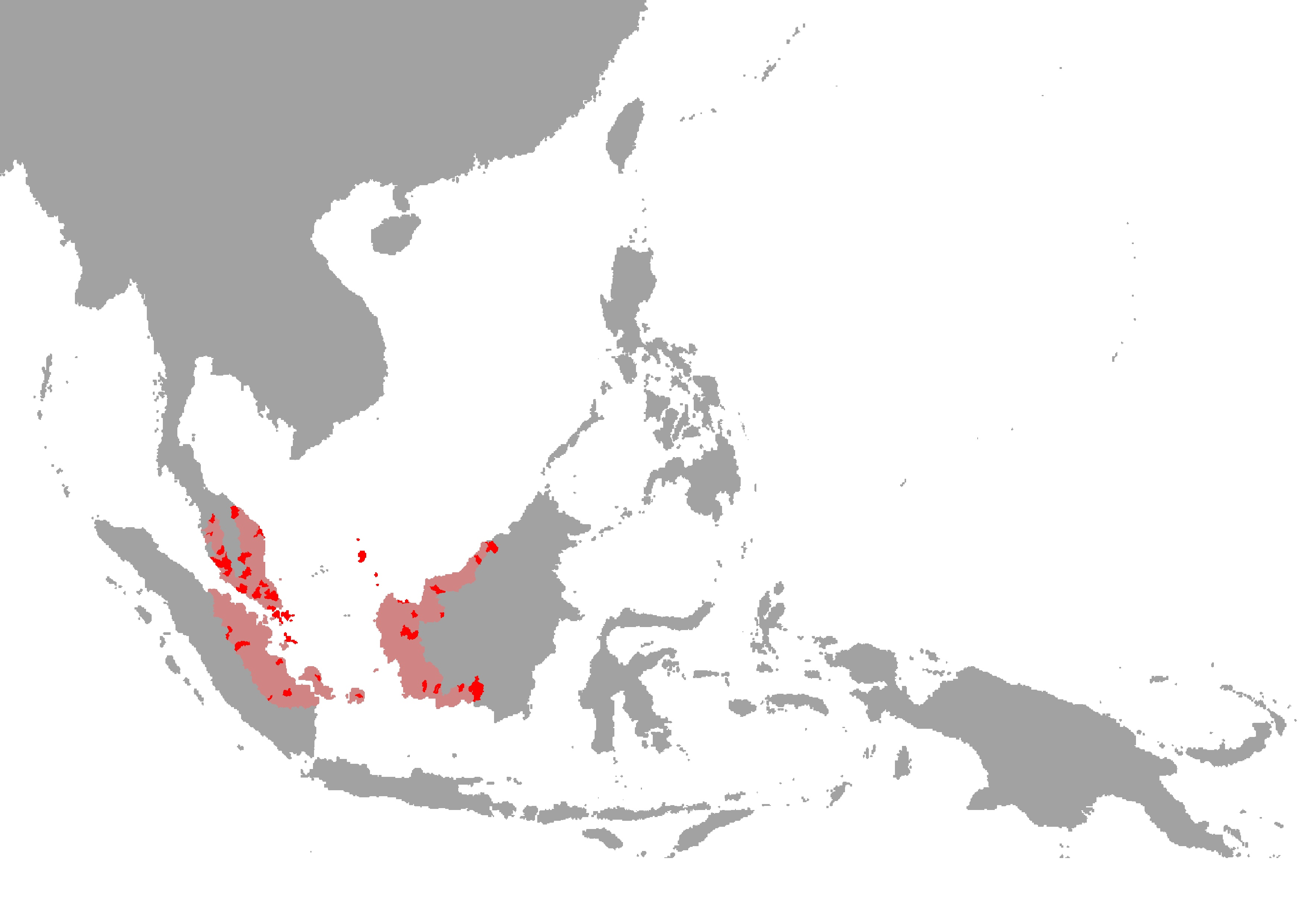
- Red:extant, light red: possibly extant

Synonyms
- Diplopterus pulcher J. E. Gray, 1830

= Luciocephalus pulcher =

Species of fish

Luciocephalus pulcher, the pikehead, giant pikehead or crocodile pikehead, is a species of gourami native to the Malaya Peninsula, Sumatra, and Borneo. It is a yellowish-brown fish with dark brown longitudinal bands and stripes, and can reach a length of 20 centimetres (7.9 in) SL.

It can also be found in the aquarium trade, where it is notoriously difficult to keep; they require extremely soft, acidic water and seldom eat dead foods.

== Habitat ==
It can be found in a variety of habitats like flooded forests, streams, and peat swamps, especially in areas with plentiful vegetation.

== Behavior ==
Compared to most gouramies, it is a highly specialized ambush predator that spends most of its time lying motionless near plants or other cover for potential prey to approach; when it does attack a potential meal (usually a smaller fish), it is able to extend its jaw to about one-third of its body length, allowing it to successfully prey upon fishes almost half of its own length.

Like several closely related genera (such as Sphaerichthys), it is a mouthbrooder (in this case a paternal mouthbrooder).
