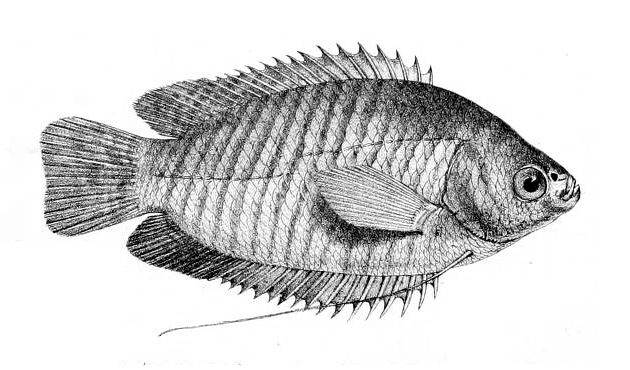
- Illustration by Francis Day

Conservation status
- Least Concern (IUCN 3.1)

Scientific classification
- Kingdom: Animalia
- Phylum: Chordata
- Class: Actinopterygii
- Order: Anabantiformes
- Family: Osphronemidae
- Genus: Trichogaster
- Species: T. fasciata

Binomial name
- Trichogaster fasciata Bloch & J. G. Schneider, 1801
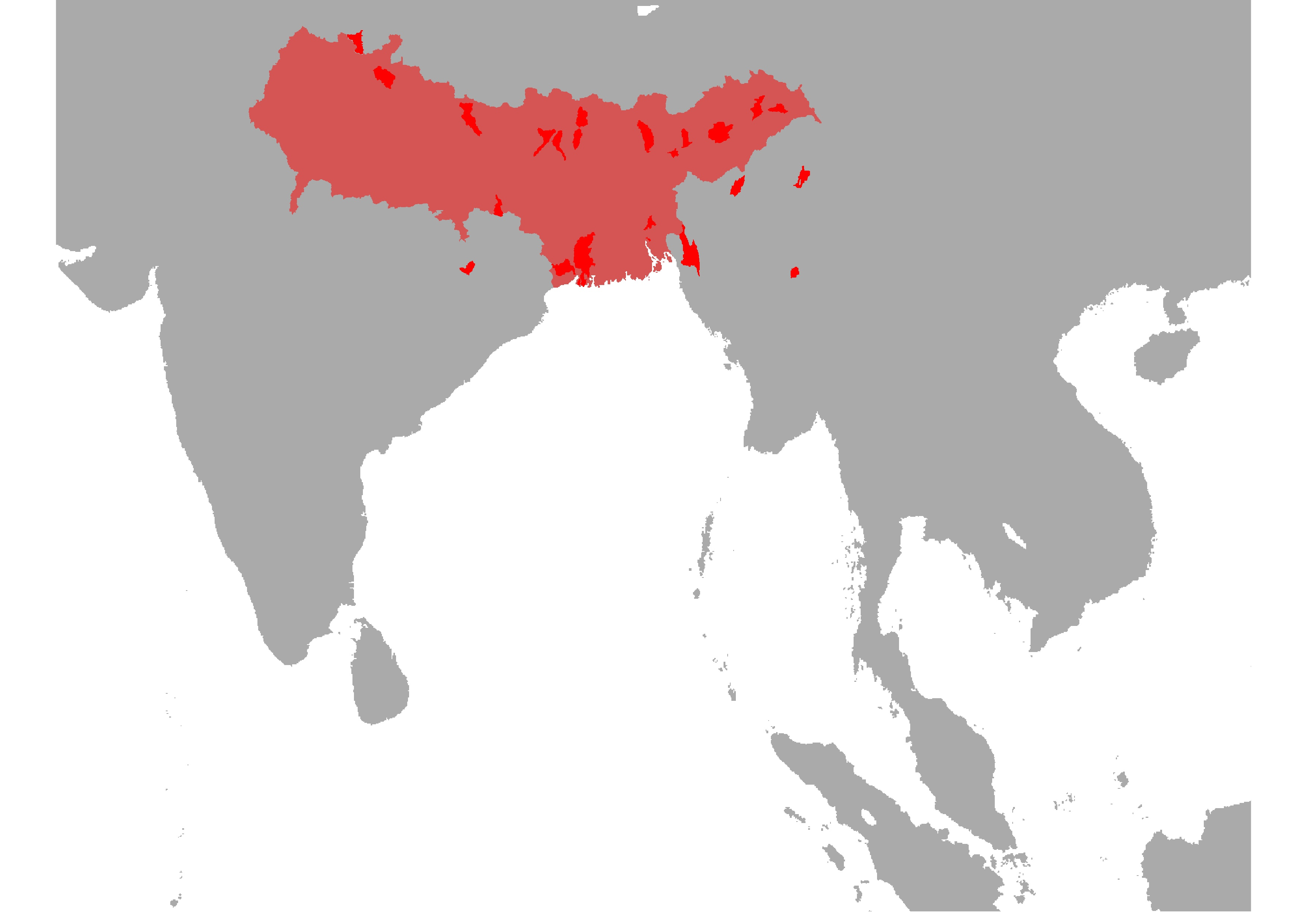
- Red: extant, light red: possibly extant

Synonyms
- Colisa fasciata (Bloch & Schneider, 1801); Colisa fasciatus (Bloch & Schneider, 1801); Polyacanthus fasciatus (Bloch & Schneider, 1801); Trichopodus colisa Hamilton, 1822; Trichopodus bejeus Hamilton, 1822; Trichopodus cotra Hamilton, 1822; Colisa vulgaris Cuvier, 1831; Colisa ponticeriana Valenciennes, 1831; Trichogaster bejeus (Knight et al., 2022)

= Trichogaster fasciata =

Trichogaster fasciata Temporal range: Pliocene–Present

Species of fish

Trichogaster fasciata, the banded gourami or striped gourami or Colisa or Kholshe, is a tropical labyrinth perch found in some Asian countries, including Bangladesh, Eastern India, Northeastern India, Nepal, Upper Myanmar, China and Pakistan.

It is also called the giant gourami, and for this reason it is often confused with the Osphronemus goramy, which has the same common name.

== Characteristics ==
Trichogaster fasciata is an air-breathing fish, so the aerial respiration is performed with the help of a pair of supra-branchial chambers, each containing a complicated labyrinthine organ. The body is elongated and compressed. The mouth is small and slightly protrusible. Preorbital serrate is found in young fish. The body color is greenish, with oblique orange or bluish bars descending downwards and backwards from the back to the anal fin.

It is benthopelagic, and prefers weedy environments such as estuaries, ponds, large rivers, ditches, lakes and rice fields.

The species has drawn attention for its taste, nutrition and ornamental value as an aquarium fish. It is somewhat shy but quite hardy, and easily adapts to life in a community aquarium. It is also easy to breed in captivity. The banded gourami is exported to Germany, Hong Kong, Japan, Malaysia, Republic of Korea, Singapore, Taiwan, Thailand and the US due to its distinctive color.

In the past, the species was readily available in freshwater pools, ponds, ditches, marshes, rivers, and lakes with vegetation, but the natural resources of this fish are declining fast due to various anthropogenic stressors.

== Feeding habit ==
The mouth of this species is bordered by thick lips, the upper being protrudable and more pronounced in the male. Small and feeble teeth are present in the mouth and buccal cavity. The intestine is long and coiled.

The fish is omnivorous in nature, so they can feed on live, frozen and flake feeds.

== Sexual dimorphism ==
Males are much more colourful than females, and develop pointed dorsal and anal fins when they are mature.

== Reproduction ==
The total life span of this species is approximately four years. The banded gourami has three distinctive life stages: pre-spawning (January–March), spawning (April–August) and post-spawning (September–December). They become sexually mature at one year of age, with the total length of the male and female reached approximately at 10 cm and 6–8 cm, respectively. Generally males are slightly larger than females. Male and female broods are distinguished by examining the gonads and external morphological features: the upper lip of the male is more pronounced, and the dorsal ventral fins are more pointed at the posterior end, than those of the female.

Like other Anabantoids, this species is a bubble nest builder, and the fertilization is external.

== Relationship with humans ==
Before being introduced into the aquarium trade, the dwarf, along with the snakeskin gourami, was and still is a popular food fish in its native range. In Bangladesh it is known as "kholisha" and "khosti" in India, and "kungee" in Punjab, as well as different linguistic variants within its range.

== Taxonomy ==
Trichogaster fasciata was formally described in 1801 by Marcus Elieser Bloch and Johann Gottlob Schneider, with the type locality given as Tranquebar, a Danish trading post in India. It is the type species of the genus Trichogaster.
