= Giovanni Canestrini =

Italian naturalist, biologist and translator

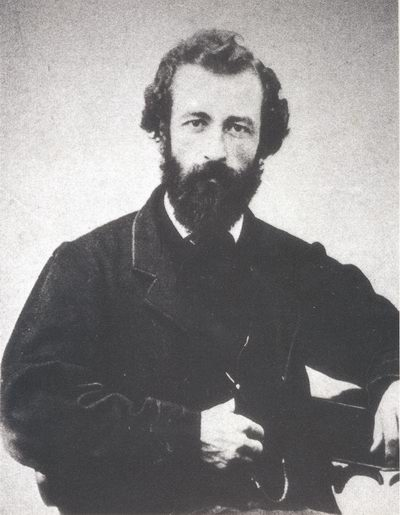
Giovanni Canestrini (1835–1900)

Giovanni Canestrini (26 December 1835 – 14 February 1900) was an Italian naturalist and biologist and translator who was a native of Revò.

== Career ==
He initially studied in Gorizia and Meran, then furthered his education in natural sciences at the University of Vienna. From 1862 to 1869, he was a lecturer at the University of Modena, and in 1869 became a professor of zoology and comparative anatomy at the University of Padua.

In 1862 he founded the Società dei Naturalisti Modenesi (Modena Society of Naturalists), and in 1871, the Società Veneto-Trentina di Scienze Naturali (Trento-Venetian Society of Natural Sciences). He is credited with establishment of the bacteriology laboratory at Padua.

Canestrini made contributions in several biological disciplines, performing important research in the field of acarology. He was an advocate of Darwinism, and was responsible for translating Darwin's works. In 1864, he was the first to translate Darwin's On the Origin of Species into Italian. Through these translations, Canestrini was a principal factor concerning the popularity of Darwinism in 19th century Italy. He wrote Origine dell’uomo (The Origin of Man, 1866) which advocated common ancestry and defended Darwin from criticisms of Giovanni Giuseppe Bianconi and others, this work was published five years before Darwin's The Descent of Man. However, although Canestrini was a supporter of many of Darwin's ideas, he rejected his theories of pangenesis and sexual selection.

During his career he was the author of almost 200 scientific publications.

== Written works ==
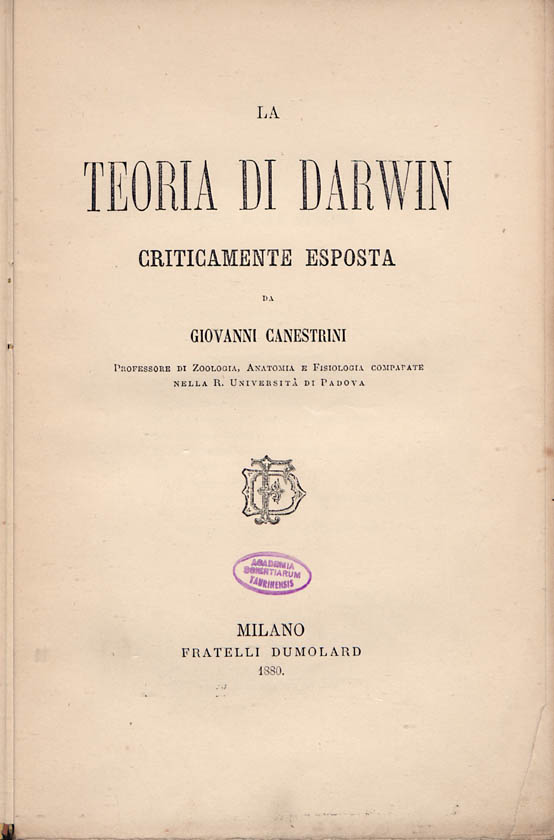
La teoria di Darwin, 1880

- Origine dell’uomo. 1866 - Origin of man.
- Aracnidi italiani. 1868 - Italian arachnids.
- Compendio di zoologia e anatomia comparata, 3 volumes, 1869, 1870, 1871 - Outline of zoology and comparative anatomy.
- Prime nozioni di antropologia. 1878 - Basics of anthropology.
- Apicoltura. 1880 - Apiculture.
- La teoria di Darwin criticamente esposta. 1880 - A critical account of Darwin’s theory
- La teoria dell’evoluzione esposta nei suoi fondamenti. 1887 - The theory of evolution exhibited in its foundations.
- Antropologia. 1888 - Anthropology.
- Prospetto Dell’Acarofauna Italiana, 8 volumes, 1885–1899 - Prospectus of Italian Acari.
- Sistema per la classe degli Acaroidei. 1891 - System for the class of Acari.
- Batteriologia. 1896 - Bacteriology.

Translations

- Charles Darwin's On the Origin of Species, 1864; Expression of the Emotions in Man and Animals, 1878; Insectivorous Plants 1878.
