= Bengaluru Aquarium =

Namma Bengaluru Aquarium
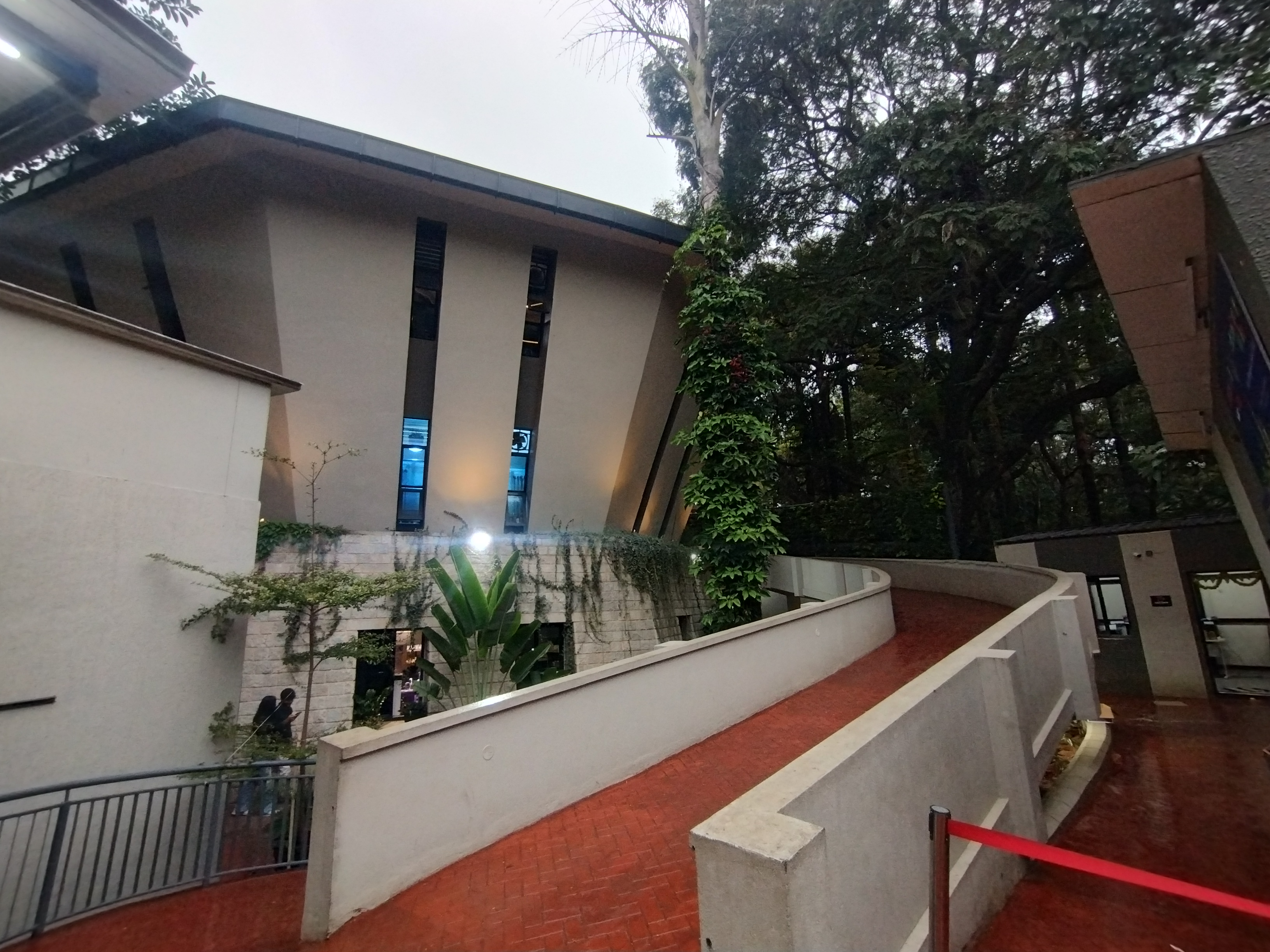
- Namma Bengaluru Aquarium in 2025
- Interactive map of Namma Bengaluru Aquarium
- 12.9765°N 77.5986°E
- Date opened: 1983
- Location: Bengaluru Urban, Karnataka, India

Namma Bengaluru Aquarium is the second largest aquarium in India. It is located at the entrance of Cubbon Park in Bengaluru, India, and was established in 1983. It has a variety of exotic cultivable as well as marine fishes on display. It is very near to vishweshwarayya museum. The aquarium is administered by the Karnataka State Government Department of Fisheries.

== Building ==
Government Aquarium for public display was constructed during 1972 and was officially inaugurated on 27.08.1983. Government aquarium, Cubbon park is a ‘fresh water fish aquarium’ in an octagonal shape and is a three-storied building. The total area of the Government aquarium is 2700 sq.m. Out of the built up area is 850 sq.m. It is the second largest aquarium in the country. The ground floor comprises the office. The first floor has 14 big tanks. On the second floor, aquariums are arranged in two rows and there are a total of 62 numbers of medium to small size aquaria. It has about 40–50 varieties both indigenous and exotic species of freshwater ornamental fish. The Government Aquarium works under the direct control of the Directorate of Fisheries and Curator is the head of the aquarium.

Working days and holidays of Aquarium

- The Aquarium is open to public on all days except:
  - Mondays and second and fourth Tuesdays.
  - All Government holidays (Also if holiday falls on a Sunday)
- Note: The aquarium will be open for public viewing on 26 January, 15 August and November 1 every year. (The aquarium will be closed on the next working day)
- Timings: 10:00 AM to 5:30 PM

Entry Fee

- The entry fee is Rs.150 per head.
- If the children visit aquarium through their respective schools, then the ticket rate is at Rs.5.00 per head (Up to 10th standard).
- No charges for children below 5 years.

== Species on display ==
Fish that can be seen at the aquarium include eels, angelfish, glowlight tetra, hockey stick tetra, red-tail shark, catla, Indian tiger barb, mahseer, freshwater prawns, blue gourami, pearl gourami, gold fish, moon tail, and more.

== Governance ==
Bengaluru Aquarium is administered by the State Government.

== Gallery ==
=== Fishes of Bengaluru Aquarium in 2025 ===
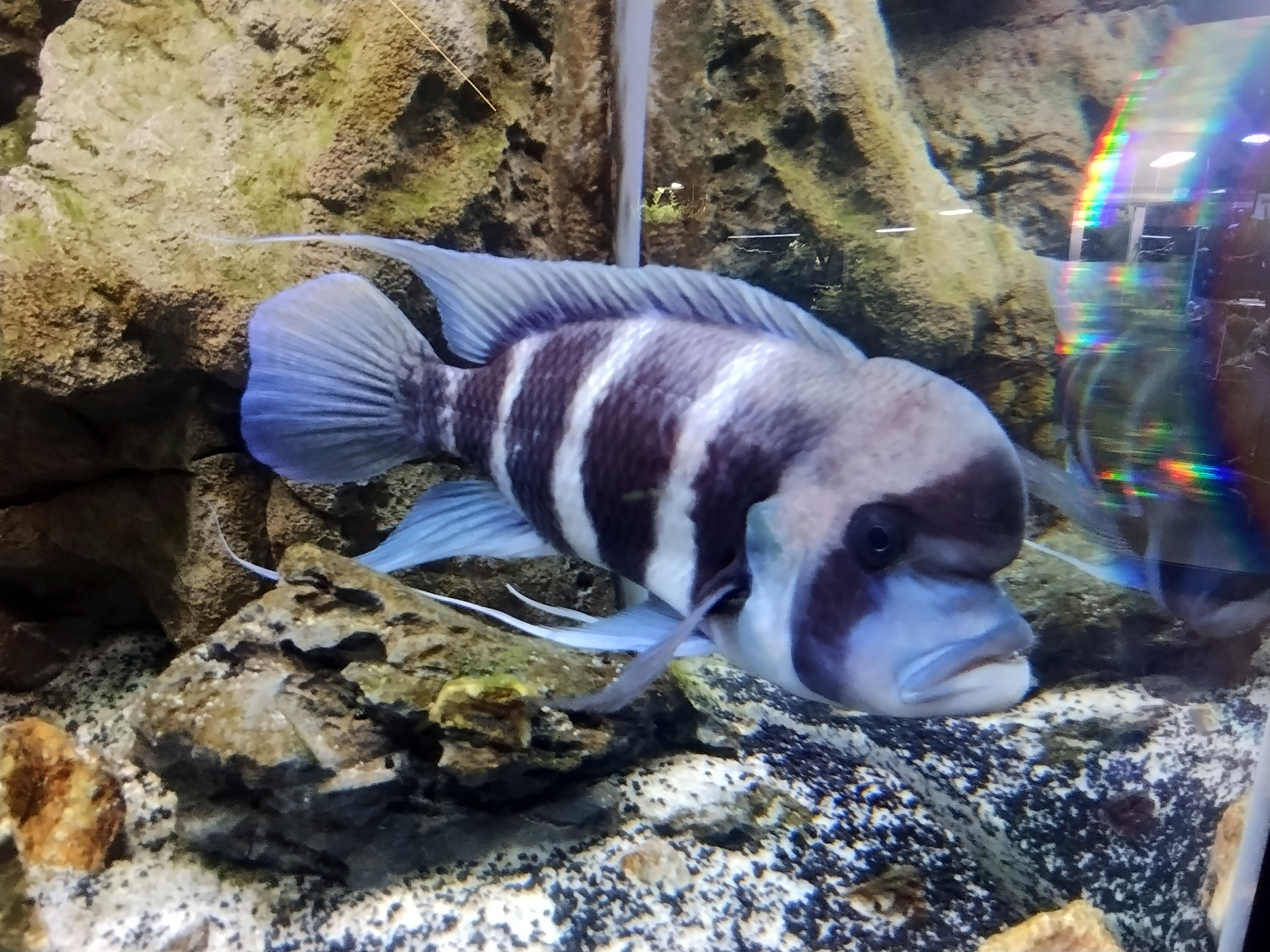

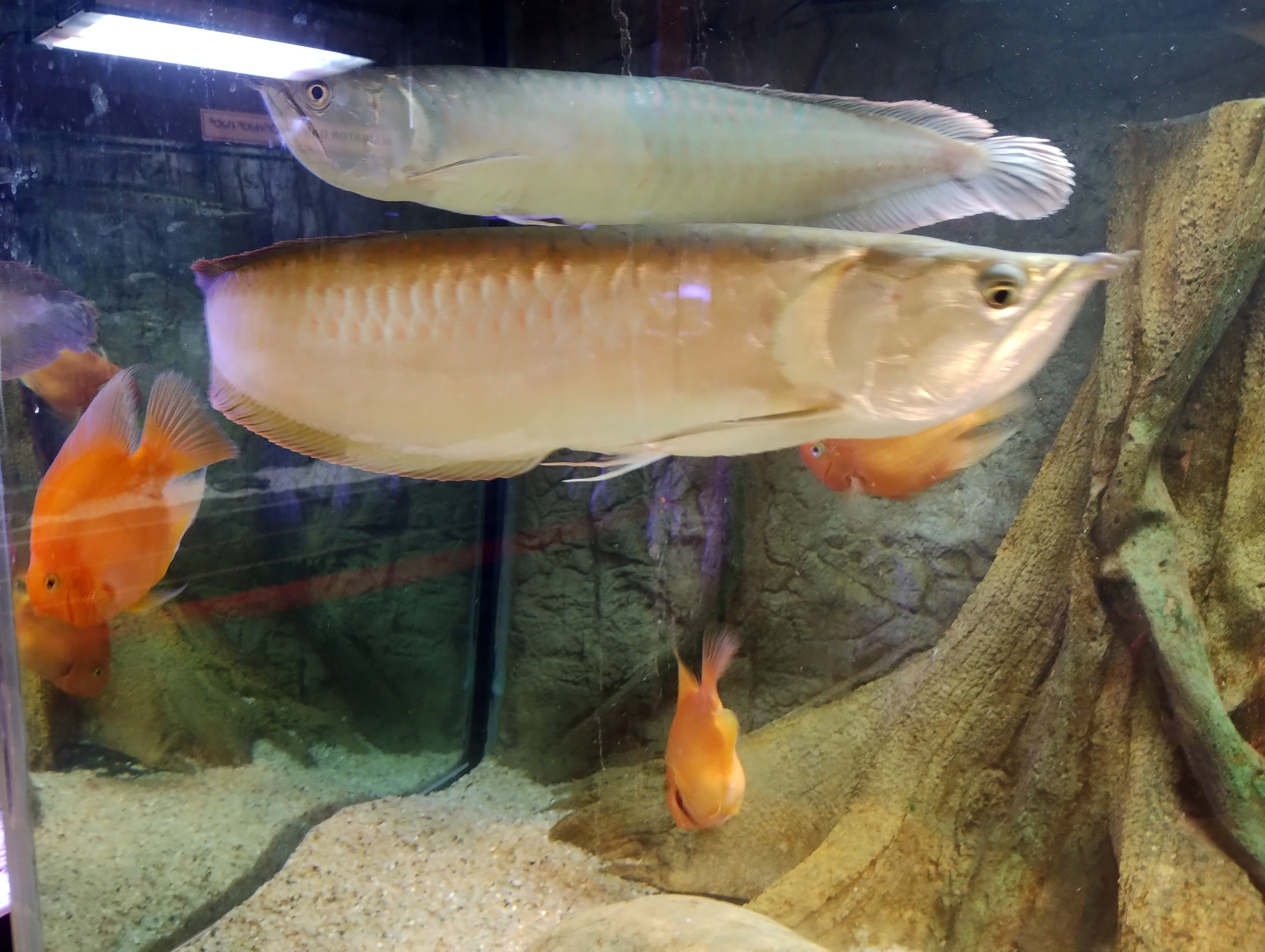

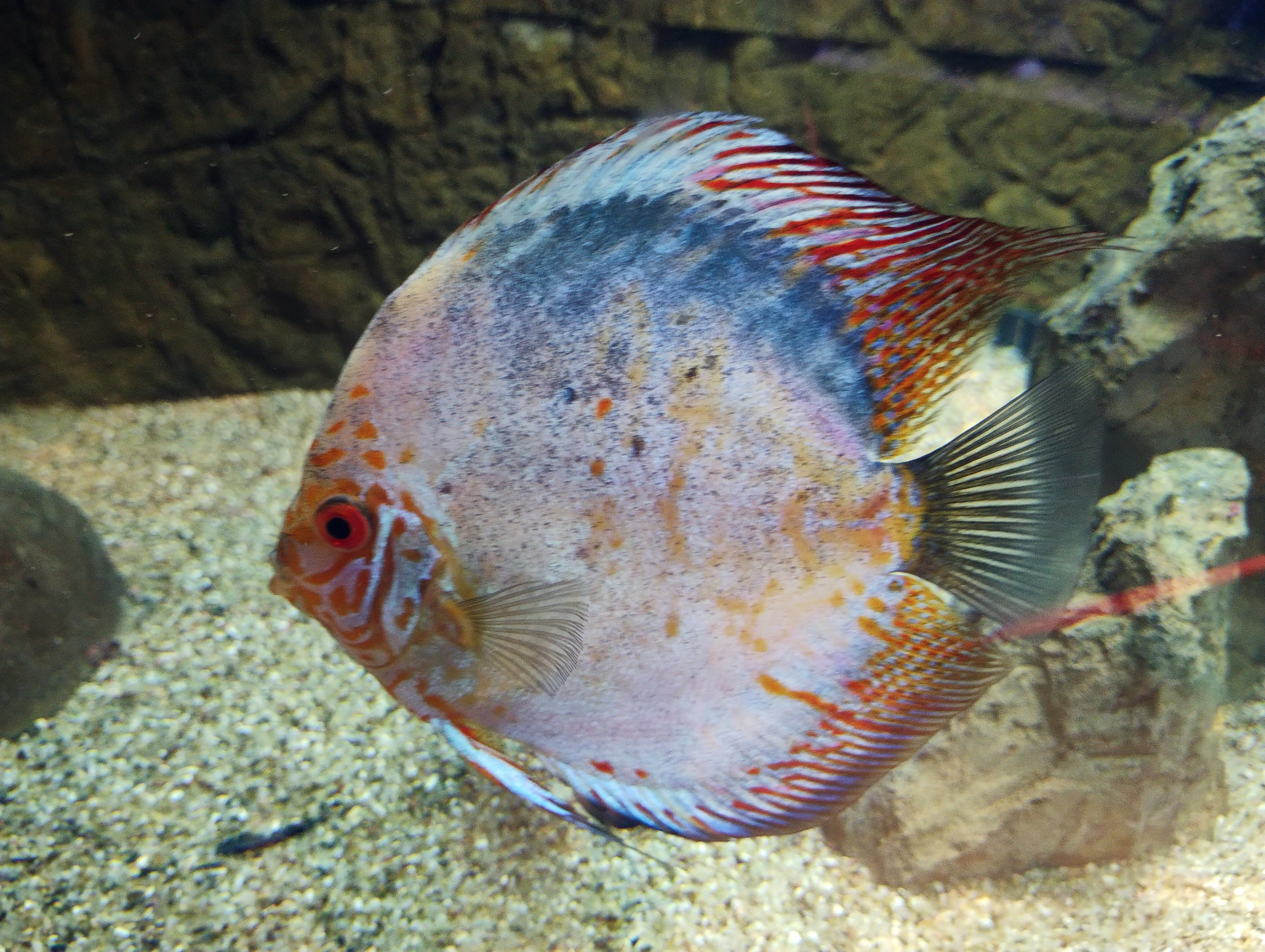

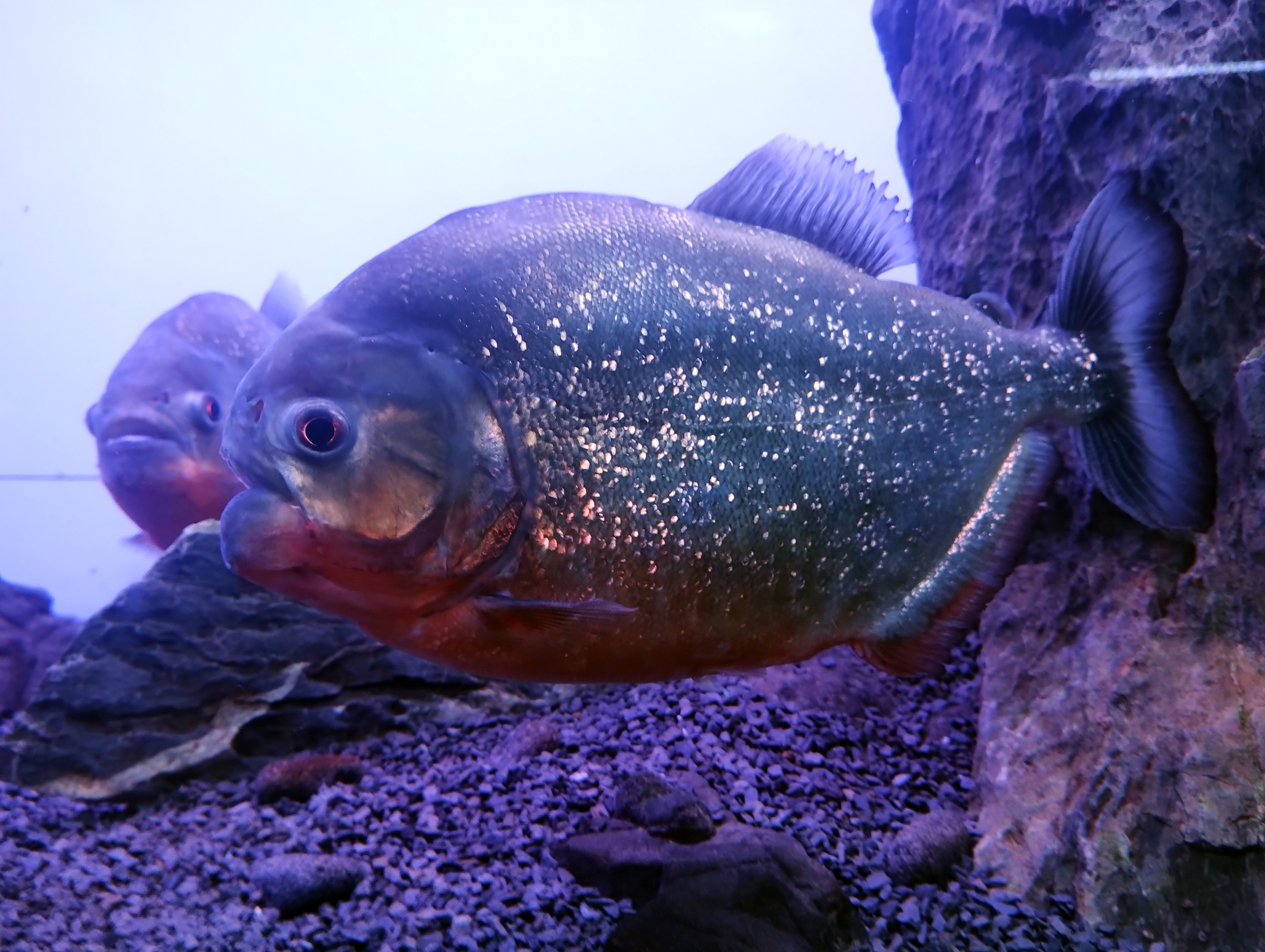

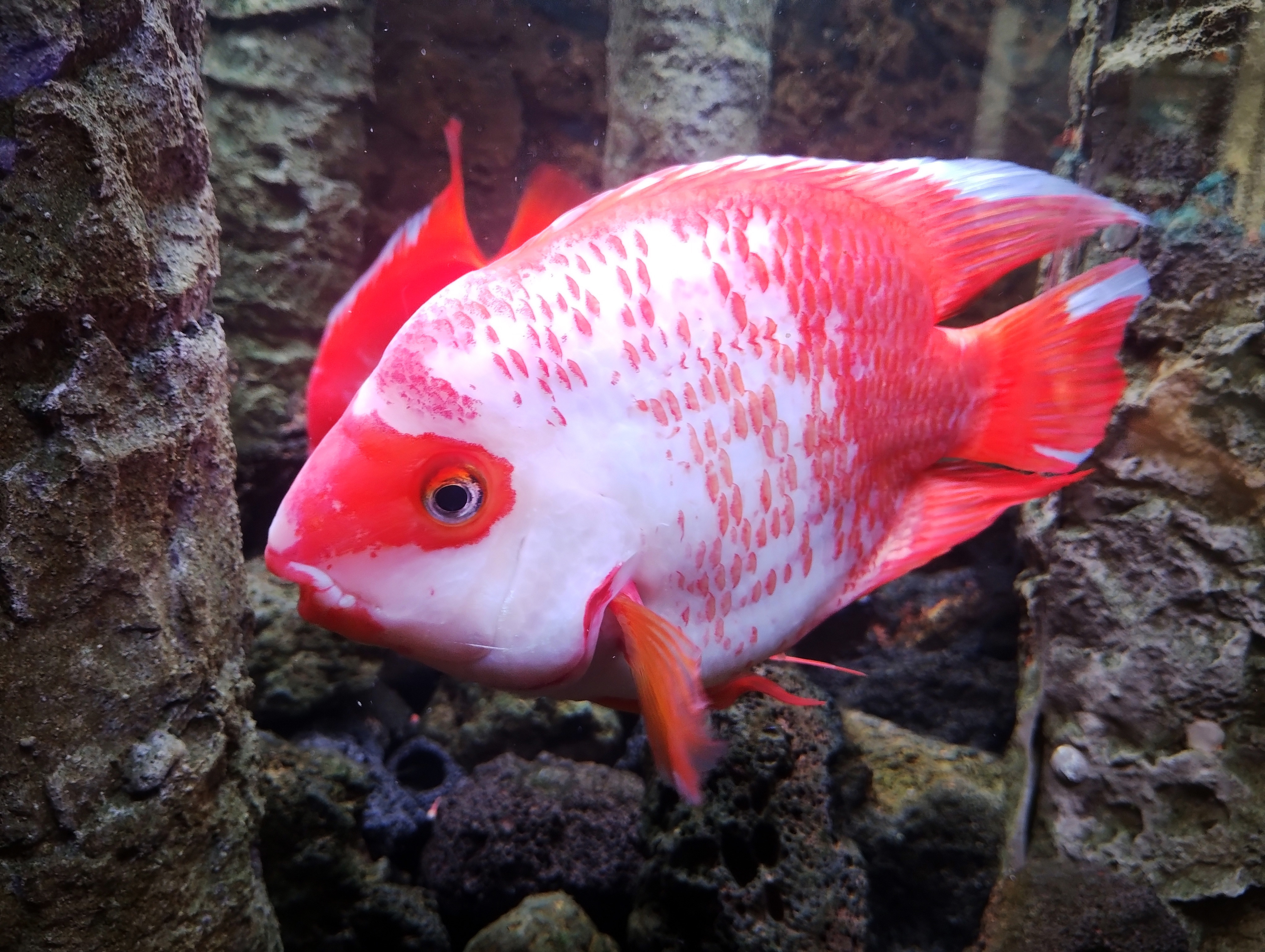

=== Bengaluru Aquarium in 2025 ===
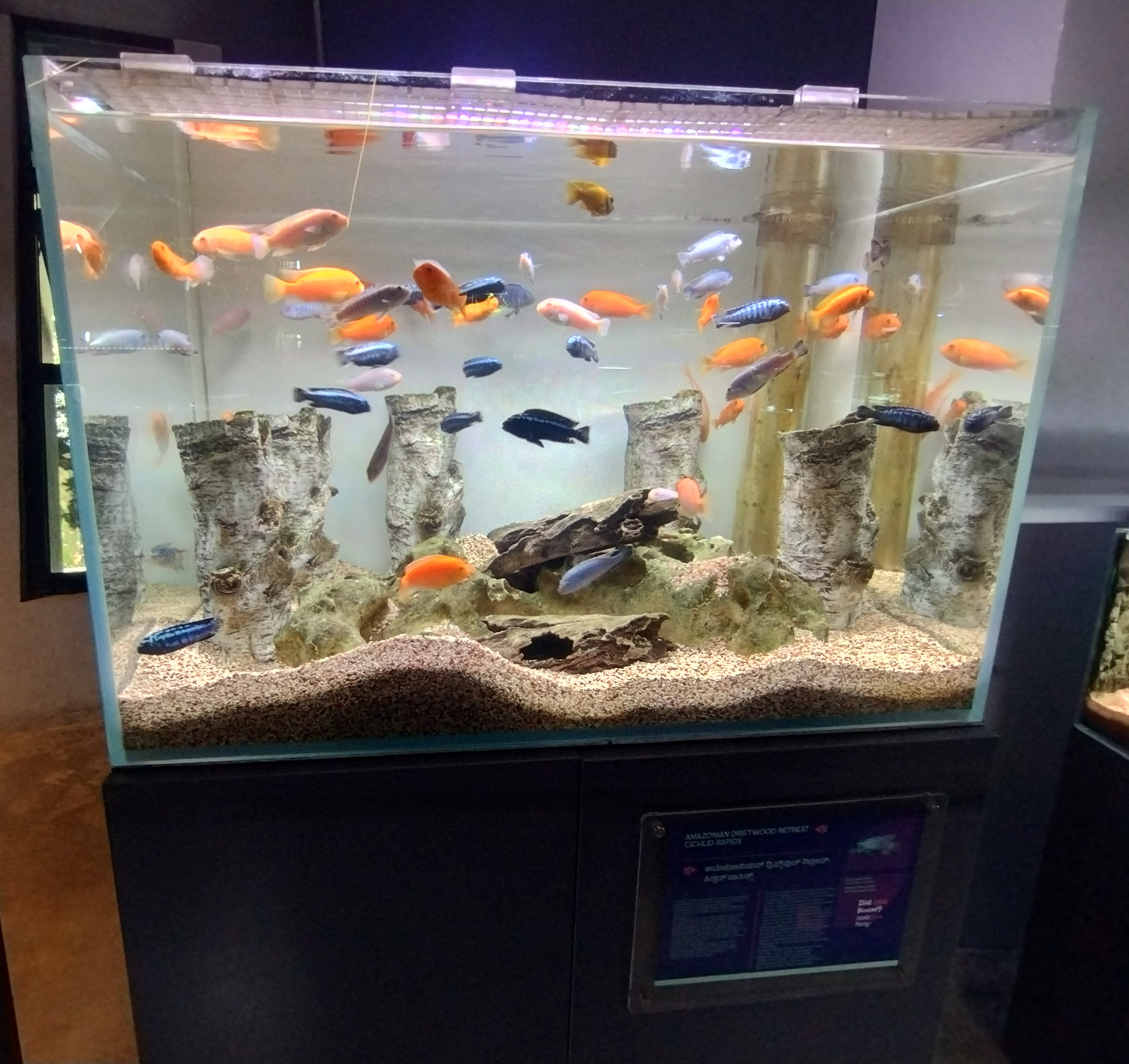

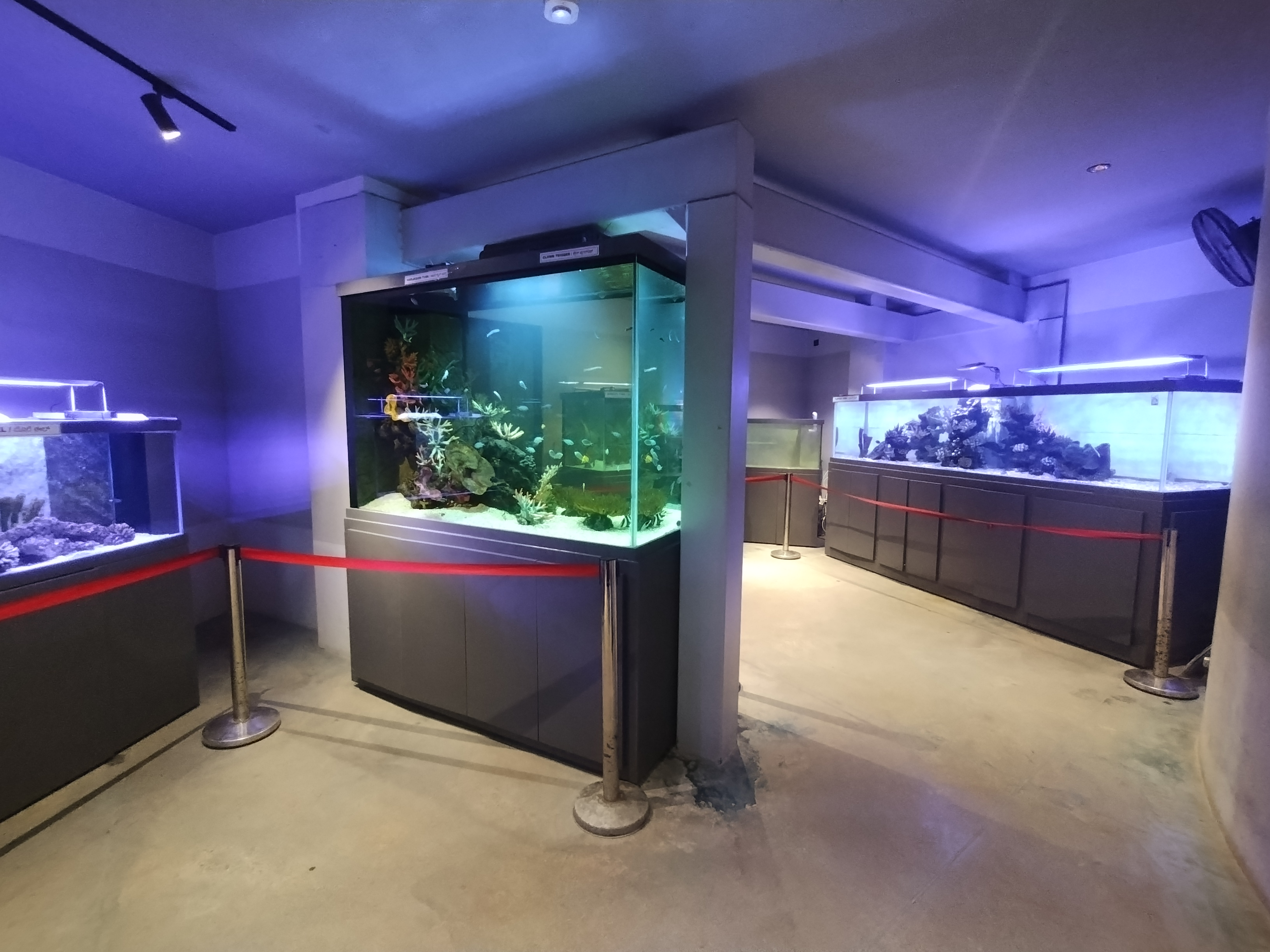

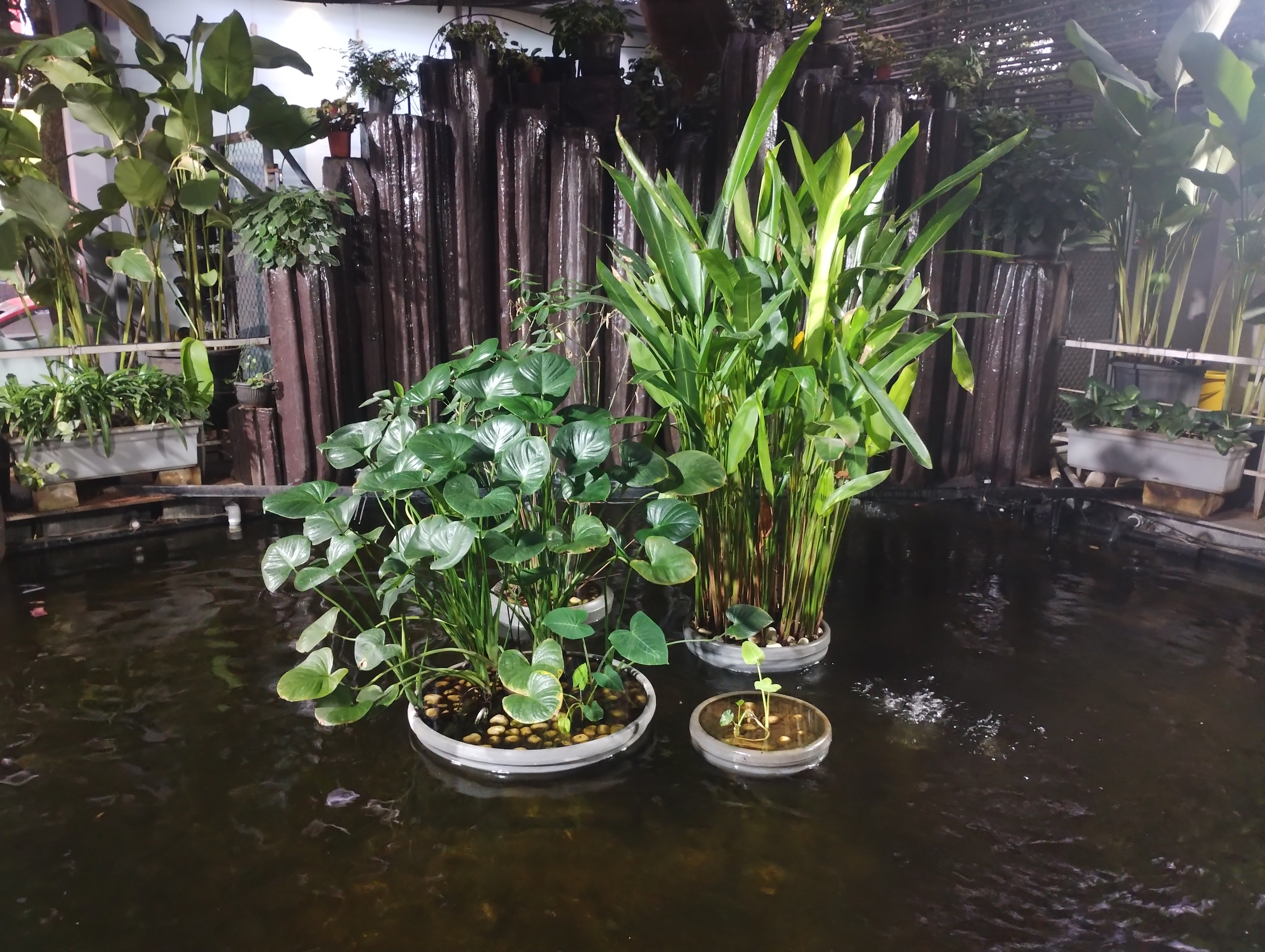

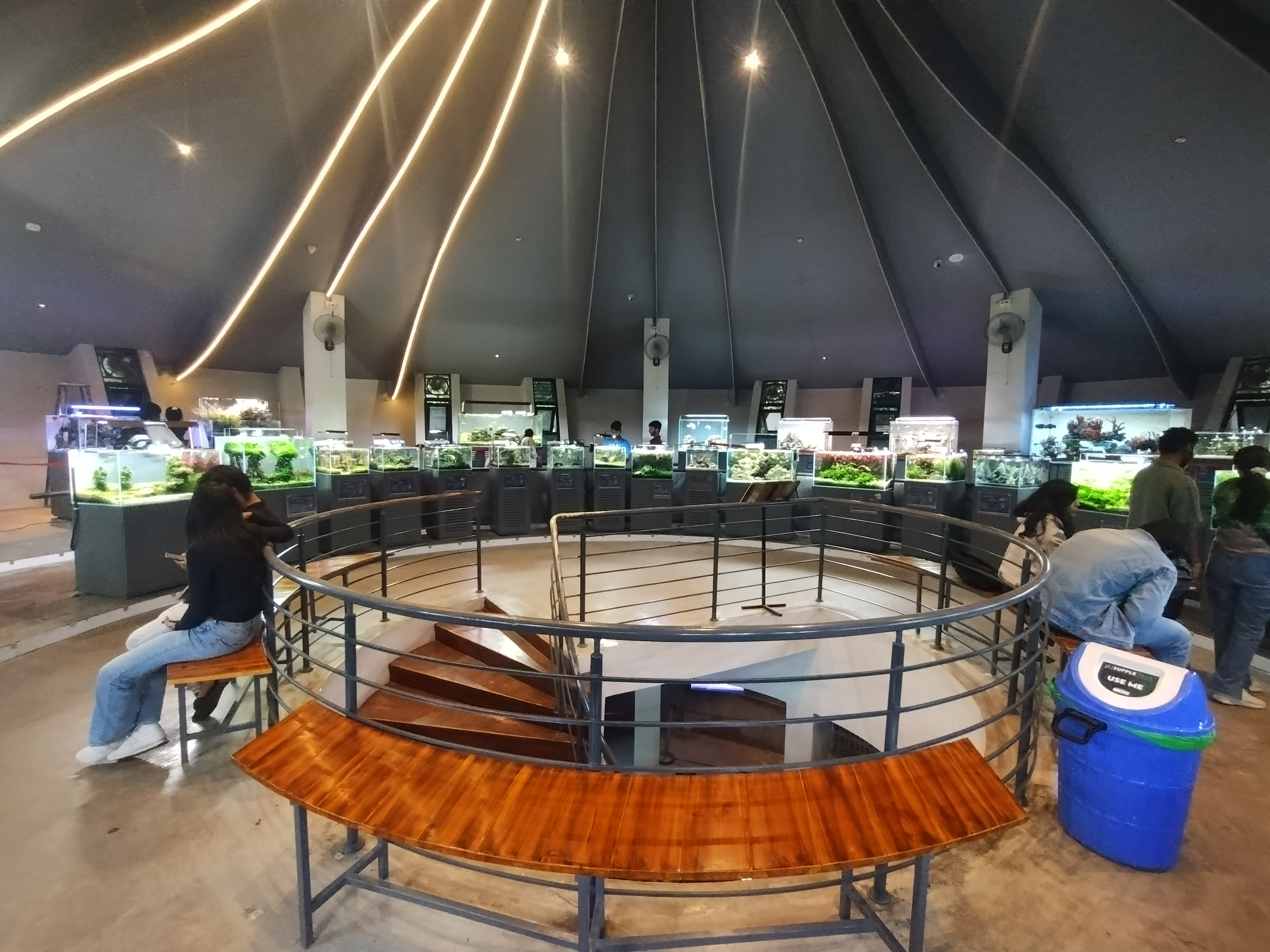

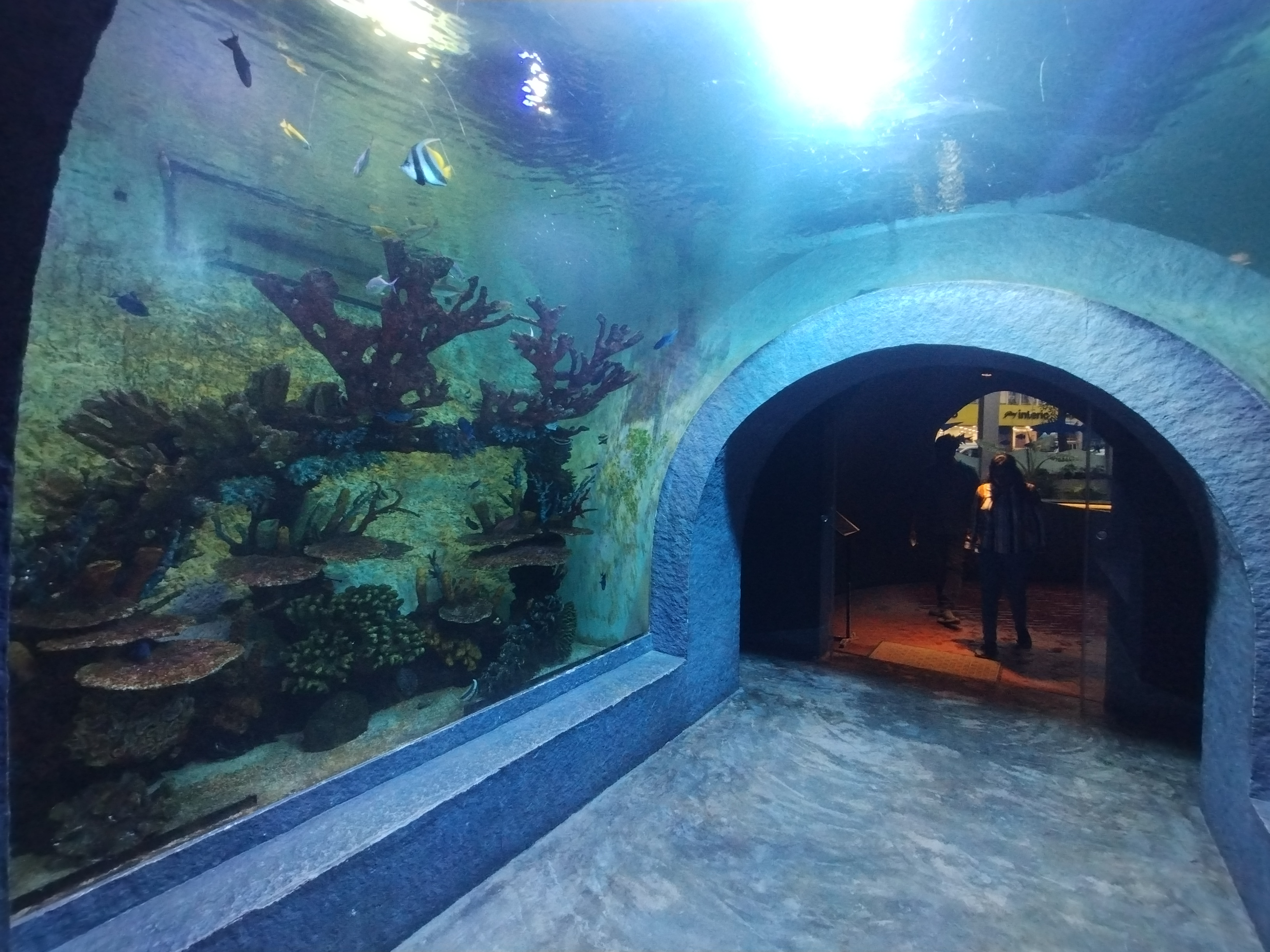

== See also ==
- Aquatic Kingdom, another aquarium in KSR Bengaluru railway station
