= Trichopodus cantoris =

Scientific classification
- Domain: Eukaryota
- Kingdom: Animalia
- Phylum: Chordata
- Class: Actinopterygii
- Order: Anabantiformes
- Family: Osphronemidae
- Genus: Trichopodus
- Species: T. cantoris

Binomial name
- Trichopodus cantoris (Günther, 1861)

Synonyms
- Osphromenus trichopterus cantoris Günther, 1861

Species of fish

Trichopodus cantoris is a species of gourami native to Asia. This taxon is treated as a synonym of Trichopodus trichopterus by some authorities.

== Etymology ==
The species was named after Dr. Cantor as the type came from his collection.

== Description ==
The two black spots on the body of Trichopodus cantoris are united by a longitudinal zigzag band running from the mouth through the eye to the caudal fin. The caudal fin is white-spotted, and the height of the body is two-fifths or three-sevenths of the SL.

== Distribution ==
The type specimen of Trichopodus cantoris came from Penang, Malaysia. The distribution of the species is likely to be throughout the Malay Peninsula.
