= Thayeria tapajonica =

Scientific classification
- Kingdom: Animalia
- Phylum: Chordata
- Class: Actinopterygii
- Order: Characiformes
- Family: Acestrorhamphidae
- Genus: Thayeria
- Species: T. tapajonica

Binomial name
- Thayeria tapajonica Moreira & F. C. T. Lima, 2017

Species of fish

Thayeria tapajonica is a species of freshwater ray-finned fish belonging to the family Acestrorhamphidae, the American characins.

This species is endemic to Brazil, where it only occurs in the basin of the Rio Tapajós downstream of its confluence with the Rio Juruena and Rio Teles Pires. It also occurs in the lower Teles Pires.

It is similar to T. boehlkei in having a dark midlateral stripe that extends from the caudal peduncle to merge with the stripe along the anterior portion of the back. However, this midlateral stripe is narrower than that of T. boehlkei.
