= Trichopodus poptae =

Conservation status
- Data Deficient (IUCN 3.1)

Scientific classification
- Kingdom: Animalia
- Phylum: Chordata
- Class: Actinopterygii
- Order: Anabantiformes
- Family: Osphronemidae
- Genus: Trichopodus
- Species: T. poptae

Binomial name
- Trichopodus poptae Low, H. H. Tan & Britz, 2014

Species of fish

Trichopodus poptae is a species of ray-finned fish in the subfamily Luciocephalinae, part of the gourami family Osphronemidae. It is distinguished from its congeners by the faint, almost indiscernible patterning on the body apart from the black blotch at the base of the tail. This species is endemic to Kalimantan, the Indonesian part of the island of Borneo.

== Etymology ==
Its specific name, poptae, honours the ichthyologist Canna Maria Louise Popta (1860–1929) who was Curator of Reptiles, Amphibians and Fishes at the Rijksmuseum van Natuurlijke Historie in Leiden who was one of the earliest workers on Borneo's freshwater fishes and described many of the specimens collected on the trans-Borneo expeditions which took place between 1893 and 1900.

== Length ==
Trichopodus poptae reaches 6.6 cm (2.6 inches) in standard length. It is typically found in streams and ponds in the Barito River drainage.
