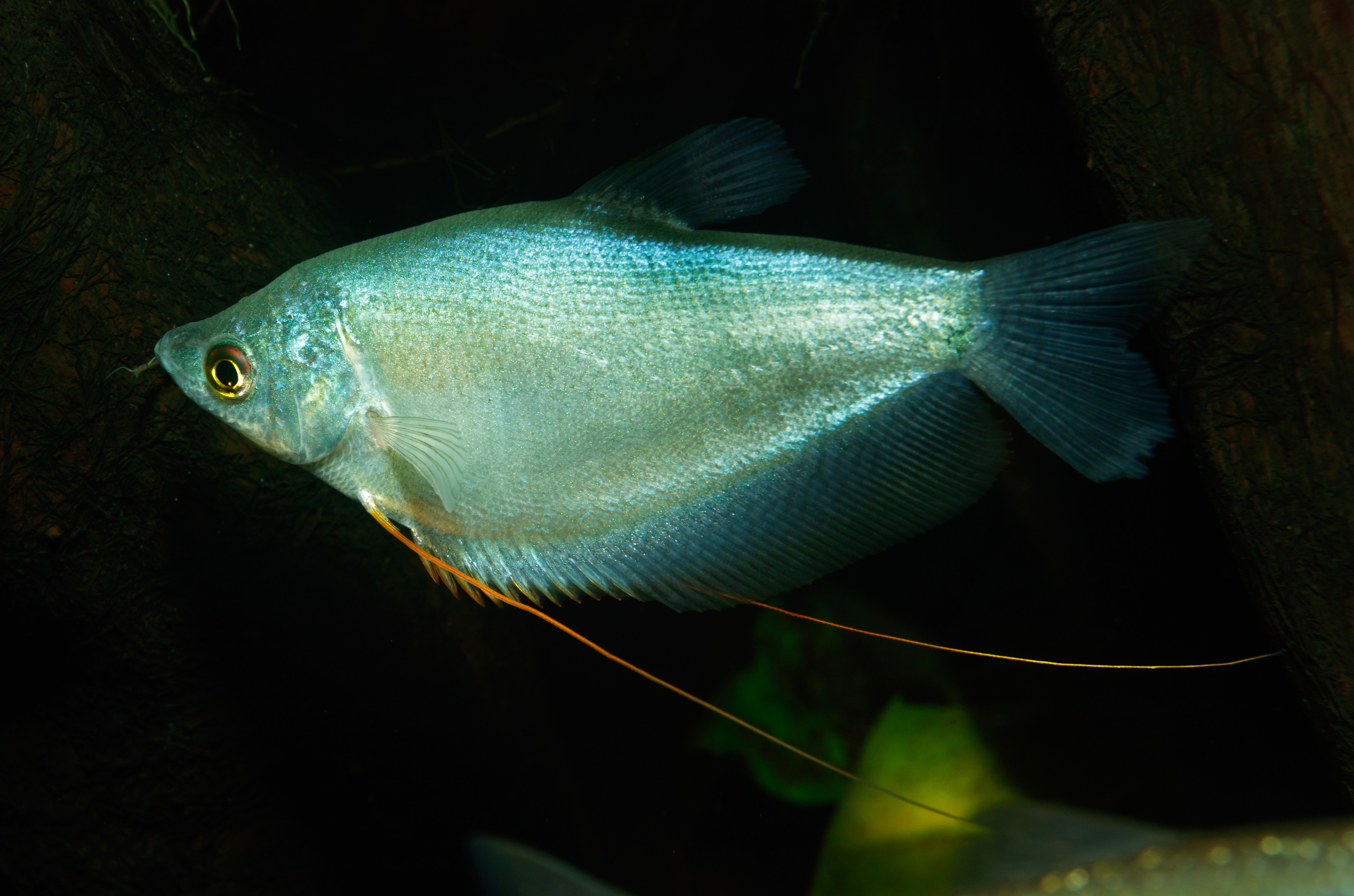

Conservation status
- Least Concern (IUCN 3.1)

Scientific classification
- Kingdom: Animalia
- Phylum: Chordata
- Class: Actinopterygii
- Order: Anabantiformes
- Family: Osphronemidae
- Genus: Trichopodus
- Species: T. microlepis

Binomial name
- Trichopodus microlepis (Günther, 1861)

Synonyms
- Osphromenus microlepis Günther, 1861; Trichogaster microlepis (Günther, 1861); Trichopus parvipinnis Sauvage, 1876; Deschauenseeia chryseus Fowler, 1934

= Moonlight gourami =

Species of fish

The moonlight gourami (Trichopodus microlepis), also known as the moonbeam gourami, is a labyrinth fish of the family Osphronemidae native to Indochina. This peaceful species is a popular aquarium fish.

== Description ==
An adult moonlight gourami reaches a length of to up 13 centimetres (5.1 in) SL.

These fish are silvery colored with a slightly greenish hue similar to the soft glow of moonlight. The moonlight gourami's concavely sloped head distinguishes it from other gourami varieties. The males can be identified by the orange to red coloration of the pelvic fins, as well as the long dorsal fins which ends in a point. In females, the pelvic fins are colorless to yellow, and the dorsal fins are shorter and rounder. During spawning, in males, the orange thread-like ventral fins will intensify and become red.

== Distribution and habitat ==
The moonlight gourami is native to the Mekong River in Cambodia and Vietnam and Chao Phraya basins. This species has been introduced into the Mekong basin in Thailand. It has also been introduced into Colombia due to escaping from aquarium rearing facilities.

This species is found in ponds and swamps. It occurs in shallow, sluggish, or standing water habitats with a lot of aquatic vegetation. It is also common in the floodplain of the lower Mekong.

== Ecology ==
The moonlight gourami eats insects, crustaceans, and zooplankton.

Like all labyrinth fish, the moonlight gourami has a special lung-like organ that allows it to breathe air directly. Because of this labyrinth organ, it is not unusual to see it go to the surface and gulp air. The ability to breathe air allows the moonlight gourami to survive in very low oxygen situations. In fact, if it remains moist it can actually survive out of water for up to several hours.

As with other labyrinth fish, these species are oviparous and employ bubble nests in reproduction and care of fry. The male moonlight gourami begins the spawning process by carefully preparing a bubble nest; this bubble nest tends not to incorporate much plant matter and the bubbles may float around freely. It will then begin to court the female under it by performing a "courtship dance" behavior. Spawning culminates when the male finally wraps itself around the female. While in this embrace, the male turns the female on to her back triggering the female to release her eggs. Up to 2000 eggs may be laid during spawning. The male will fertilize the eggs as they float up to the prepared bubble nest. In the safety of the bubble nest the eggs will incubate for about two to three days before finally hatching.
