= Thayeria ifati =

Conservation status
- Least Concern (IUCN 3.1)

Scientific classification
- Kingdom: Animalia
- Phylum: Chordata
- Class: Actinopterygii
- Order: Characiformes
- Family: Acestrorhamphidae
- Genus: Thayeria
- Species: T. ifati

Binomial name
- Thayeria ifati Géry, 1959

Species of fish

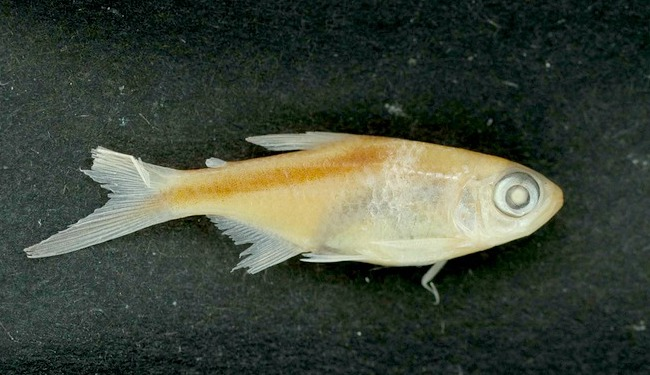
Thayeria ifati

Thayeria ifati, the half-striped penguin tetra, is a species of freshwater ray-finned fish belonging to the family Acestrorhamphidae, the American characins. It is a tropical fish. It resides in the basin of the Maroni and Approuague in French Guiana.
