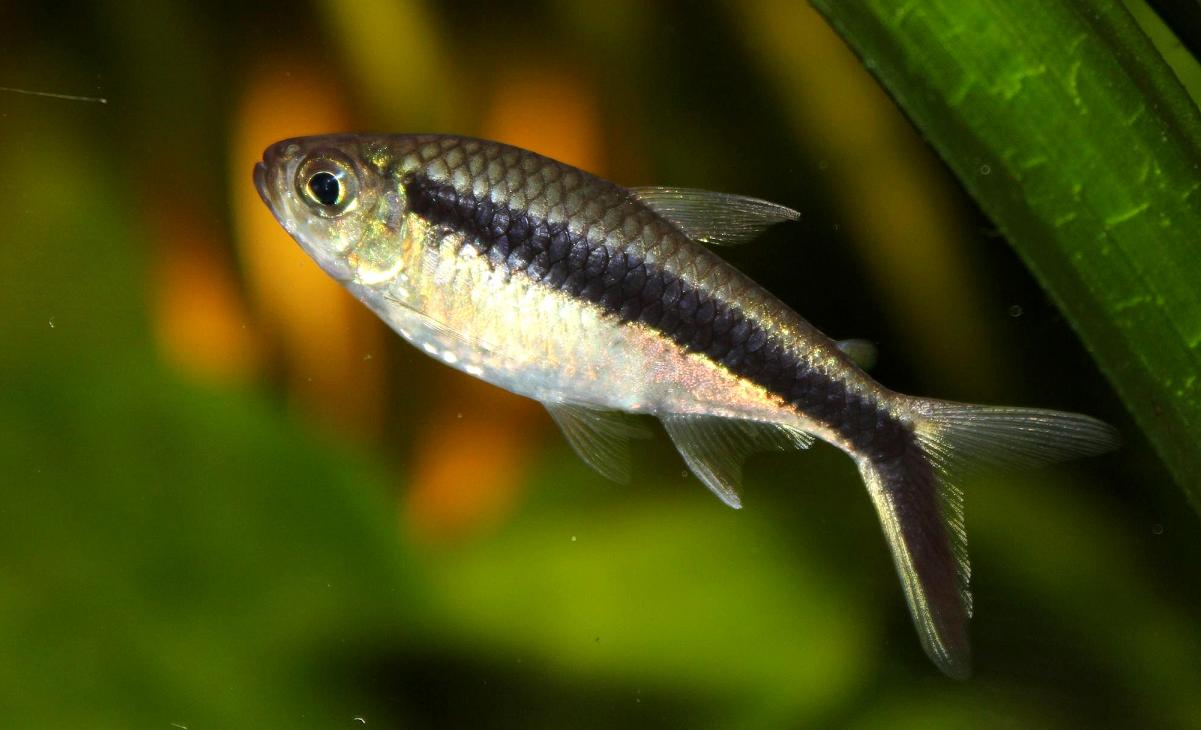
- Thayeria boehlkei

Scientific classification
- Kingdom: Animalia
- Phylum: Chordata
- Class: Actinopterygii
- Order: Characiformes
- Family: Acestrorhamphidae
- Subfamily: Thayeriinae
- Genus: Thayeria; C. H. Eigenmann, 1908

Type species
- Thayeria obliquus C. H. Eigenmann, 1908

Species
- See text

= Thayeria =

Genus of fishes

Thayeria is a genus of freshwater ray-finned fishes belonging to the family Acestrorhamphidae, the American characins. The fishes in this genus are found in the Amazon Basin, and the Approuague and Maroni Rivers in tropical South America. It includes three species, including the blackline penguinfish, T. boehlkei. Members of this genus, among other characteristics, are small, have one lateral black stripe, and have a vesica piscis shape. They are peaceful.

== Species ==
Thayeria contains the following valid species:

- Thayeria boehlkei S. H. Weitzman, 1957 (blackline penguinfish)
- Thayeria ifati Géry, 1959
- Thayeria obliqua C. H. Eigenmann, 1908 (penguinfish)
- Thayeria tapajonica Moreira & F. C. T. Lima, 2017
