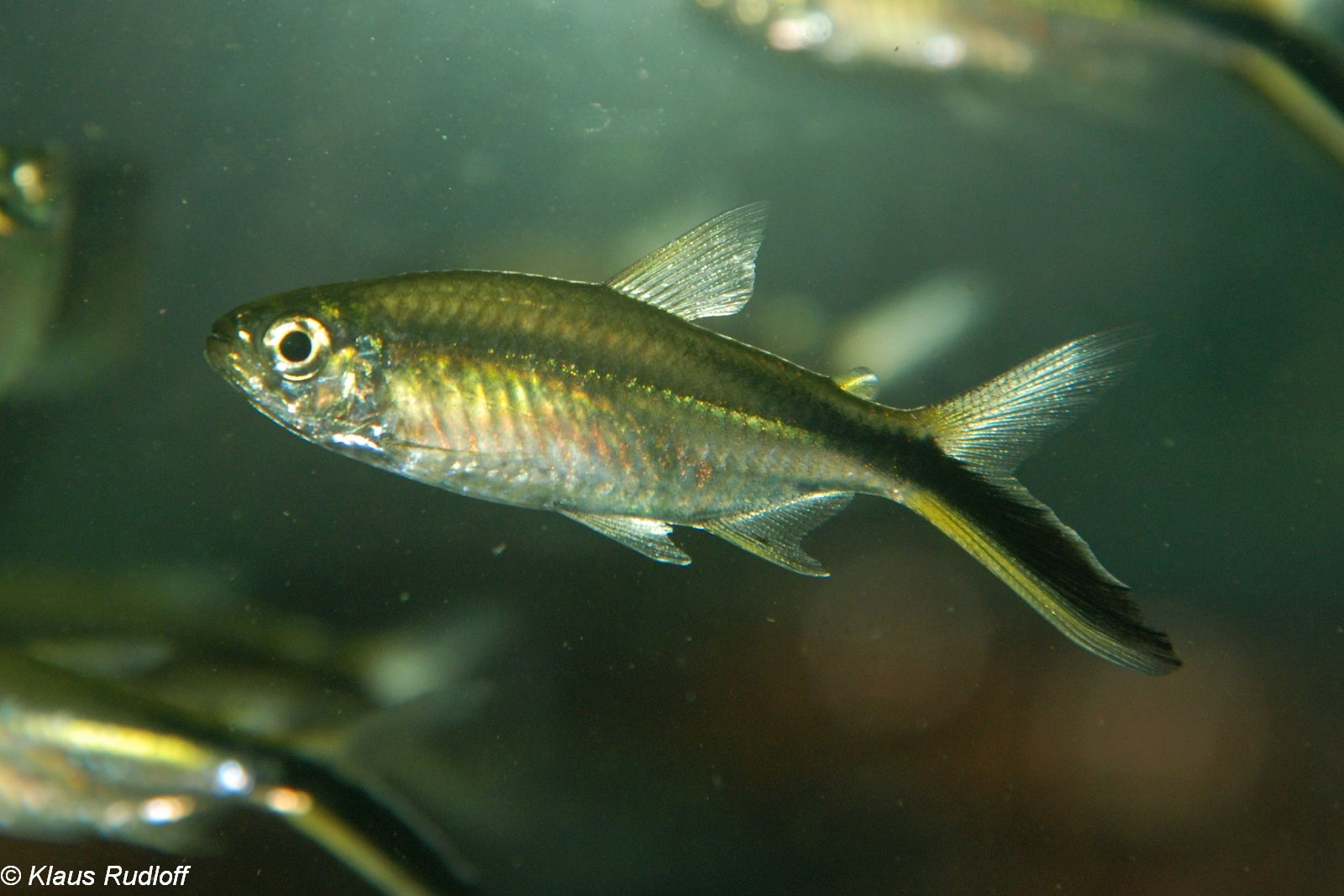

Conservation status
- Least Concern (IUCN 3.1)

Scientific classification
- Kingdom: Animalia
- Phylum: Chordata
- Class: Actinopterygii
- Order: Characiformes
- Family: Acestrorhamphidae
- Genus: Thayeria
- Species: T. obliqua

Binomial name
- Thayeria obliqua C. H. Eigenmann, 1908

Synonyms
- Thayeria obliquus C. H. Eigenmann, 1908; Thayeria sanctaemariae Ladiges, 1951

= Thayeria obliqua =

Species of fish

Thayeria obliqua, the penguinfish, is a species of freshwater ray-finned fish belonging to the family Acestrorhamphidae, the American characins. It is a tropical fish. It is found in the basin of the Tocantins River and Guaporé River in Brazil.
