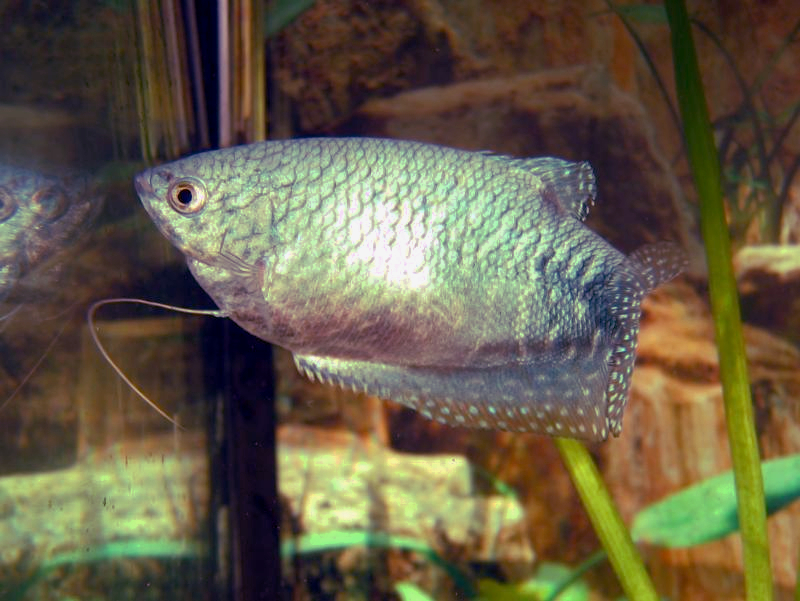
- a blue morph of the three spot gourami (T. trichopterus)

Scientific classification
- Kingdom: Animalia
- Phylum: Chordata
- Class: Actinopterygii
- Division: Teleostei
- Order: Anabantiformes
- Family: Osphronemidae
- Subfamily: Luciocephalinae
- Genus: Trichopodus; Lacépède, 1801

Type species
- Labrus trichopterus Pallas, 1770

Synonyms
- Colisa Cuvier, 1831; Deschauenseeia Fowler, 1934; Lithulcus Gistel, 1848; Polyacanthus Cuvier, 1829; Stethochaetus Gronow, 1854; Trichopus Shaw, 1803

= Trichopodus =

Genus of fishes

Trichopodus (formerly included in Trichogaster) is a genus of tropical freshwater labyrinth fish of the gourami family found in Southeast Asia. Gouramis of the genus Trichopodus are closely related to those of Trichogaster (formerly Colisa); species of both genera have long, thread-like pelvic fins (known as "feelers" in the aquarium trade) used to sense the environment. However, Trichopodus species have shorter dorsal fin base and, when sexually mature, are much larger, with the largest, the snakeskin gourami (T. pectoralis), capable of reaching a length of over 8 in (20 cm).

Along with the Trichogaster species, Trichopodus gouramis are popular in the aquarium trade. The three spot gourami (T. trichopterus), with its several aquarium variants, each known by a different trade name, is perhaps the most common aquarium gourami. Trichopodus species are also used as food fish in its native range. The snakeskin gourami, in particular, is one of the top five aquacultured freshwater fish in Thailand.

== Etymology ==
The name Trichopodus is composed of the Ancient Greek words θρίξ (thríx) which means hair and πούς (poús) which means foot.

== Species ==
There are currently 6 recognized species in this genus:

- Trichopodus cantoris Günther 1861
- Trichopodus leerii Bleeker, 1852 (Pearl gourami)
- Trichopodus microlepis Günther, 1861 (Moonlight gourami)
- Trichopodus pectoralis Regan, 1910 (Snakeskin gourami)
- Trichopodus poptae Low, H. H. Tan & Britz, 2014
- Trichopodus trichopterus (Pallas, 1770) (Three spot gourami)
