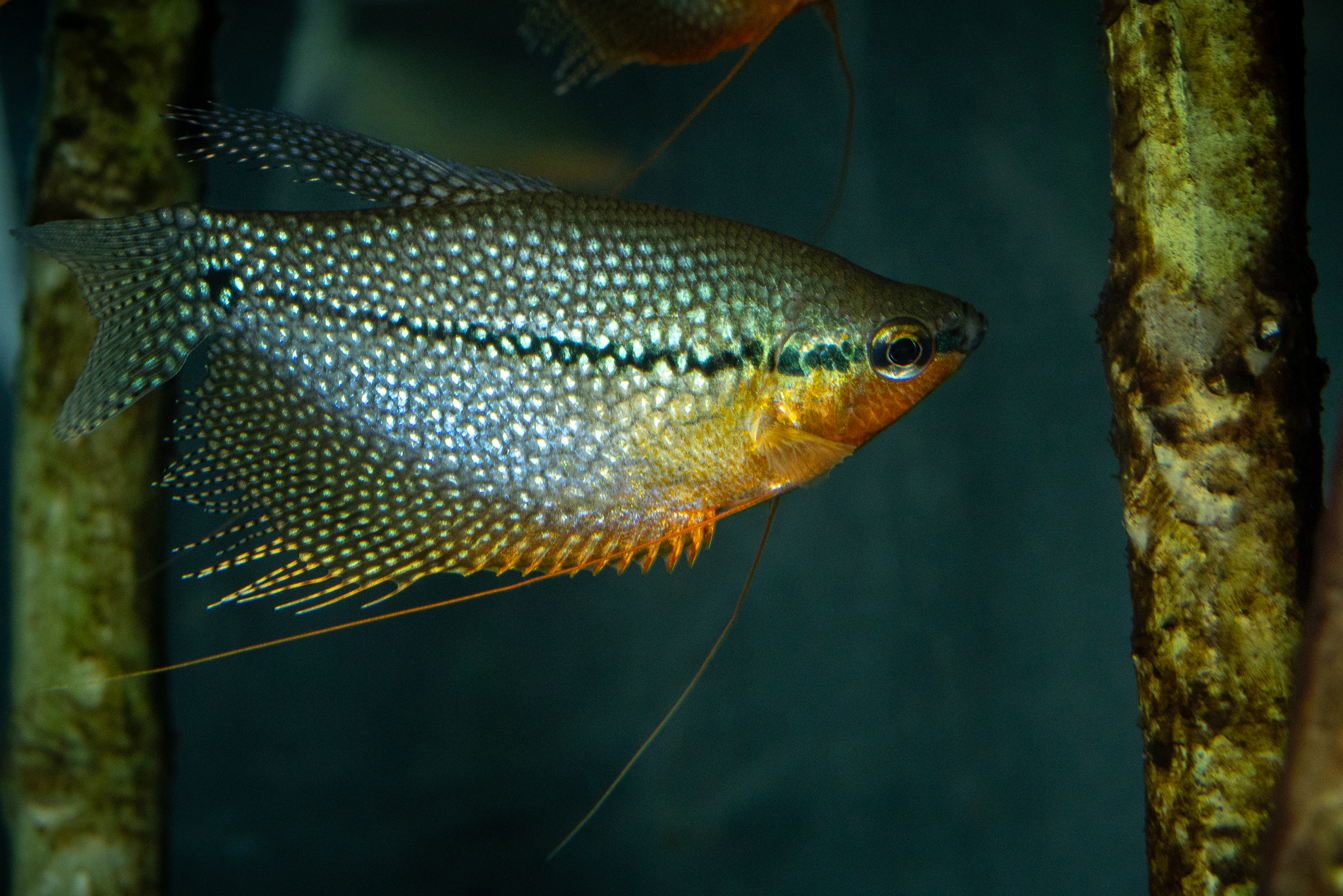

Conservation status
- Near Threatened (IUCN 3.1)

Scientific classification
- Kingdom: Animalia
- Phylum: Chordata
- Class: Actinopterygii
- Order: Anabantiformes
- Family: Osphronemidae
- Genus: Trichopodus
- Species: T. leerii

Binomial name
- Trichopodus leerii (Bleeker, 1852)

Synonyms
- Trichopus leerii Bleeker, 1852; Trichogaster leerii (Bleeker 1852)

= Pearl gourami =

Species of fish

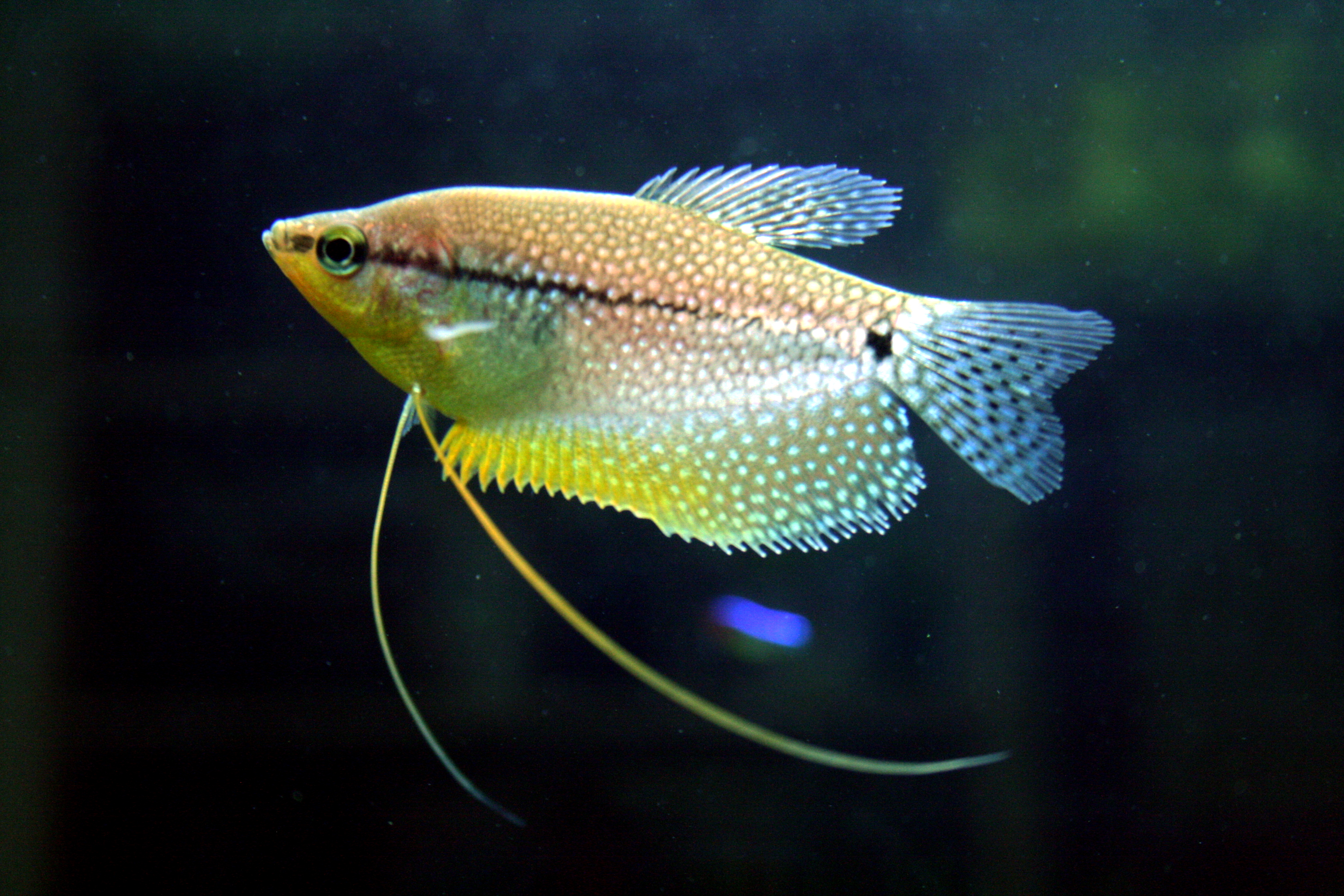
Pearl gourami male, Trichopodus leerii

The pearl gourami (Trichopodus leerii) is a species of gourami native to Southeast Asia.

== Description ==
It reaches about 12 centimetres (4.7 in) TL. Its body is a brownish-silver colour, covered in a pearl-like pattern with a distinct black line running from the fish's head, and gradually thinning towards the caudal fin. The pearl gourami's appearance has given rise to other popular names, such as the lace gourami and the mosaic gourami.

Its male specimens, typical of many gouramis, are generally larger and more colourful than their female counterparts. They exhibit bright orange colouring around the throat region, which at breeding time becomes much brighter and is used to court the female. Males also exhibit somewhat of an orange tinge in their fins, with the exception of the caudal (tail) fin. The male also has longer fins, with a more pointed dorsal fin and extended anal fin rays.

== Distribution and habitat ==
The pearl gourami is native to Thailand, Malaysia and Indonesia (where it is found on the islands of Sumatra and Borneo). It occurs in lowland swamps with acidic water.

== Species description and name ==
Trichopodus leerii was originally described as Trichopus leerii by the Dutch medical doctor and ichthyologist Pieter Bleeker in 1852. The type was collected at Palembang in Sumatra, by Lieutenant-Colonel J. M. van Leer, who was a medical colleague of Bleeker's and whom Bleeker honoured in the fish's specific name.
