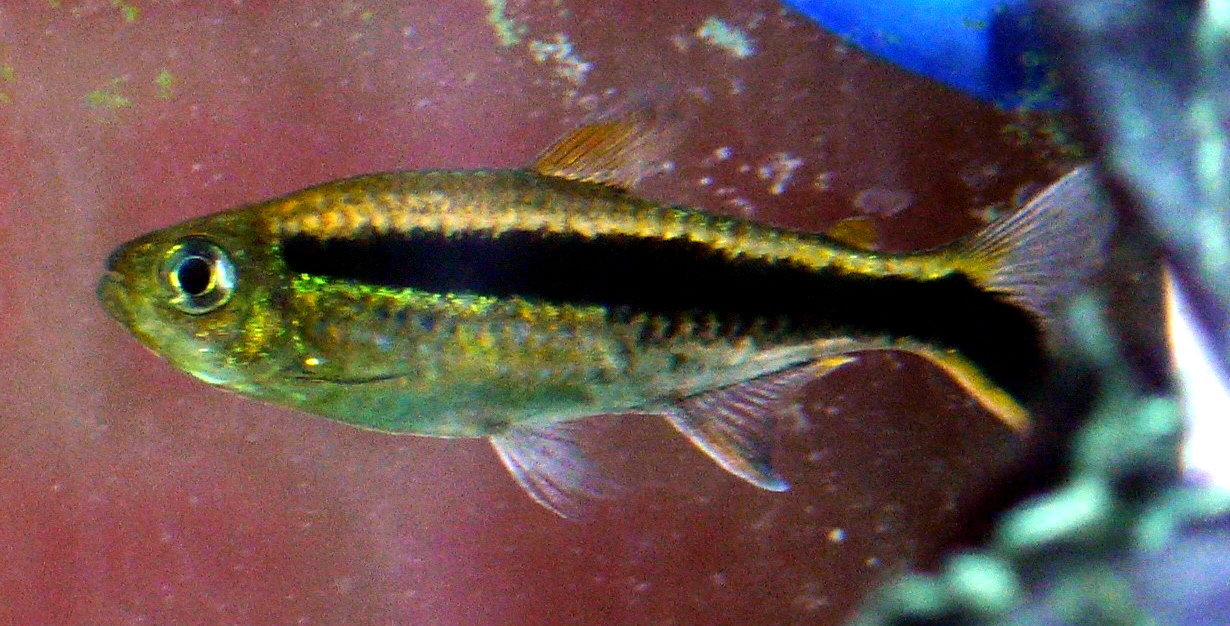

Conservation status
- Least Concern (IUCN 3.1)

Scientific classification
- Kingdom: Animalia
- Phylum: Chordata
- Class: Actinopterygii
- Order: Characiformes
- Family: Acestrorhamphidae
- Genus: Thayeria
- Species: T. boehlkei

Binomial name
- Thayeria boehlkei S. H. Weitzman, 1957

= Thayeria boehlkei =

Species of fish

Thayeria boehlkei, the blackline penguinfish, is a species of freshwater ray-finned fish belonging to the family Acestrorhamphidae, the American characins. This species is endemic to the Amazon River basin and Araguaia River, in Peru and Brazil respectively. The species is popular with aquarium hobbyists, and is traded under a variety of common names including blackline penguinfish, blackline thayeria, hockey-stick tetra, penguin fish and penguin tetra.

The fish is named in honor of James E. Böhlke (1930–1982) of the Academy of Natural Sciences of Philadelphia, because of his interest in and contributions to the knowledge of South American characids.

== Distribution and habitat ==
Thayeria boehlkei inhabits small streams and the margins of smaller rivers in the lowland Amazon basin, where it has been recorded in the Araguaia, Tocantins, Xingu, Tapajós and Teles-Pires rivers.

== Diet ==
The species feeds on worms, small insects, flake food and crustaceans.

== Reproduction ==
In captivity, this normally schooling species forms pairs that scatter their many adhesive eggs amongst plants. Clutch size is very large and may be up to 1000 eggs, the embryos of which are black in colour. The eggs hatch in about 20 hours and are free-swimming after four days.

== In the aquarium ==
The species is best kept in groups, to allow the species to school, in tropical freshwater community aquaria with other peaceful, non-predatory fishes. This fish tolerates a fairly broad range of water pHs, but prefers acidic water for breeding.

== See also ==
- Tetra
- List of freshwater aquarium fish species
