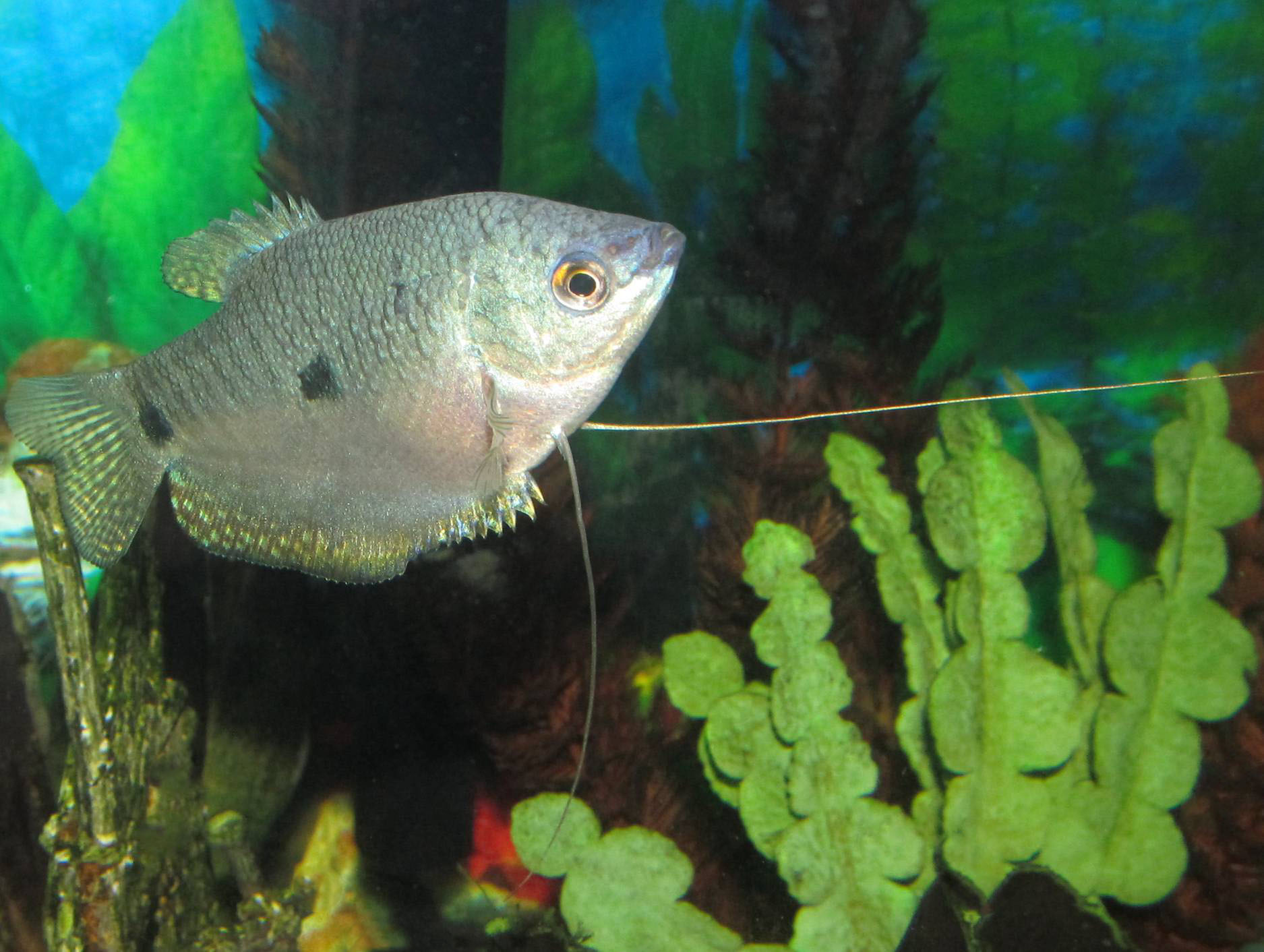

Conservation status
- Least Concern (IUCN 3.1)

Scientific classification
- Kingdom: Animalia
- Phylum: Chordata
- Class: Actinopterygii
- Division: Teleostei
- Order: Anabantiformes
- Family: Osphronemidae
- Genus: Trichopodus
- Species: T. trichopterus

Binomial name
- Trichopodus trichopterus (Linnaeus, 1758)

Synonyms
- Labrus trichopterus Pallas, 1770; Trichogaster trichopterus (Pallas, 1770); Trichopus trichopterus (Pallas, 1770); Trichopus sepat Bleeker, 1845 (ambiguous); Stethochaetus biguttatus Gronow, 1854; Osphromenus siamensis Günther, 1861; Nemaphoerus maculosus Kuhl & van Hasselt, 1879 (ambiguous); Osphromenus insulatus Seale, 1910

= Three spot gourami =

Species of fish

The three spot gourami (Trichopodus trichopterus), also known as the opaline gourami, blue gourami, and gold gourami, is a species of fish native to southeastern Asia, but also introduced elsewhere. This gourami gets its name from the two spots along each side of its body in line with the eye, considered the third spot. This species is of minor commercial importance as a food fish in its native range and is also farmed. It is also popular in the aquarium trade. The species reaches 15 cm (5.9 inches) in standard length.

== Name ==
The three spot gourami gets its vernacular name from the two spots along each side of its body in line together with the eye being considered as the third spot. It is also known as "hairfin gourami" (from its specific name trichopterus) or "two-spot gourami" (in Malaysia). Variety names include "opal" or "opaline gourami" (or "Cosby gourami") for varieties with a marbled pattern, "blue gourami" for the blue morph, "gold" or "golden gourami" for the yellow morph, "platinum gourami" for the white morph, and "lavender (or "amethyst") gourami" for the result morph of crossing a blue and gold.

== Distribution and ecology ==
Three spot gourami are native to standing or slow-moving freshwater habitats in southeastern Asia, ranging from Yunnan (China), through mainland southeast Asia (Cambodia, Laos, Malaysia, Myanmar, Singapore, Thailand and Vietnam) to Indonesia (Java, Borneo and Sumatra). They have been widely introduced outside their native range, such as the Philippines, India, Sulawesi, and southwestern Trinidad. These fish live in marshes, swamps, canals, and lowland wetlands. They migrate during the flood season from permanent water bodies to flooded areas, such as seasonally flooded forests in the middle and lower Mekong. During the dry season, they return to these permanent water bodies. These fish feed on zooplankton, crustaceans, and insect larvae. The male builds a bubble nest for the eggs, which he protects aggressively.

== In the aquarium ==
The three spot gourami is a hardy fish. They can be housed with a variety of tank mates of similar size and temperament. While males can be territorial with each other, they become timid around other, more aggressive fish.

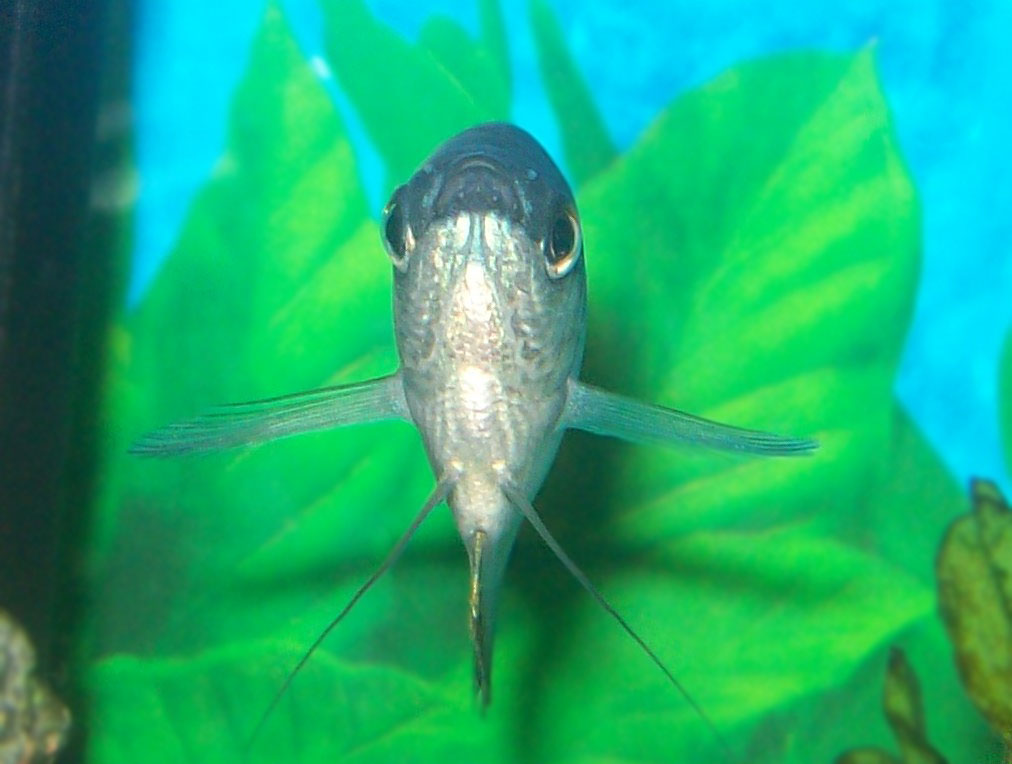
Gourami frontal view

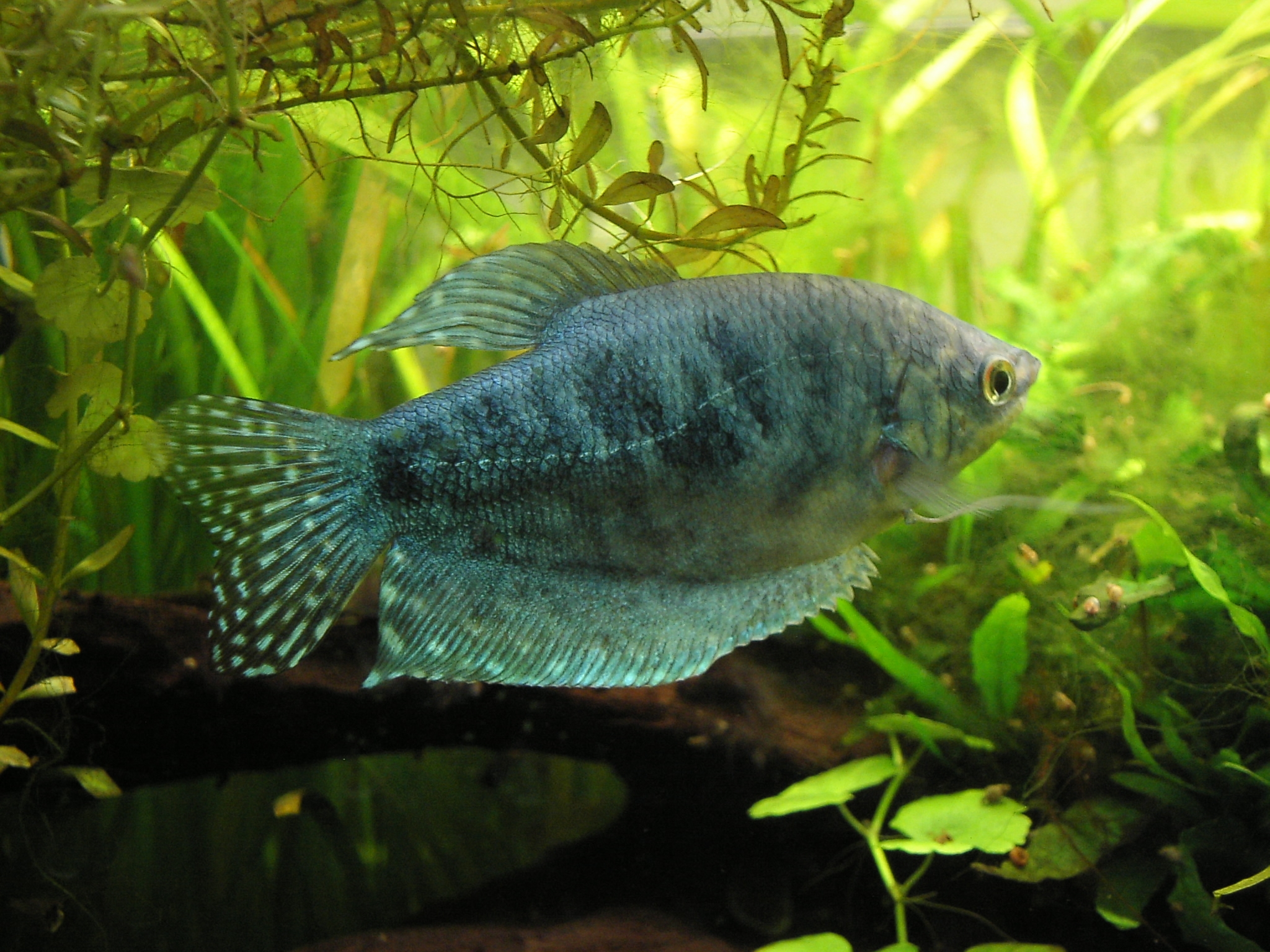
Males such as this "opaline" gourami have long dorsal fins

Male gouramis are known to be very aggressive; they may also be fin nippers and generally may bother other fish in the tank. They often show aggression toward species with long, flowing fins such as male guppies, goldfish, and bettas, because they display long tails and bright colors, presenting competition for impressing a female gourami. Female gourami sometimes bother other fish, but usually keep to themselves.

Though aquarists are typically told not to house multiple gouramis together, three spot gouramis that have been brought up together in pairs (usually females, especially if they are siblings) and that have stable personalities, can successfully cohabit with each other, provided there is enough room to swim. This varies based on individual personalities, but it has been accomplished by aquarists. In such situations, typically one may assume a more dominant role and grow larger, while occasionally teasing or playfully chasing around the smaller submissive fish, but both will generally be tolerant and cooperative toward each other.

=== Feeding ===
The three spot gourami is an omnivore and requires both algae-based and meaty foods. An algae-based flake food, along with freeze-dried bloodworms, tubifex worms, and brine shrimp provide these fish with the proper nutrition. Live foods such as mosquito larvae and daphnia are also beneficial.

== Breeding ==
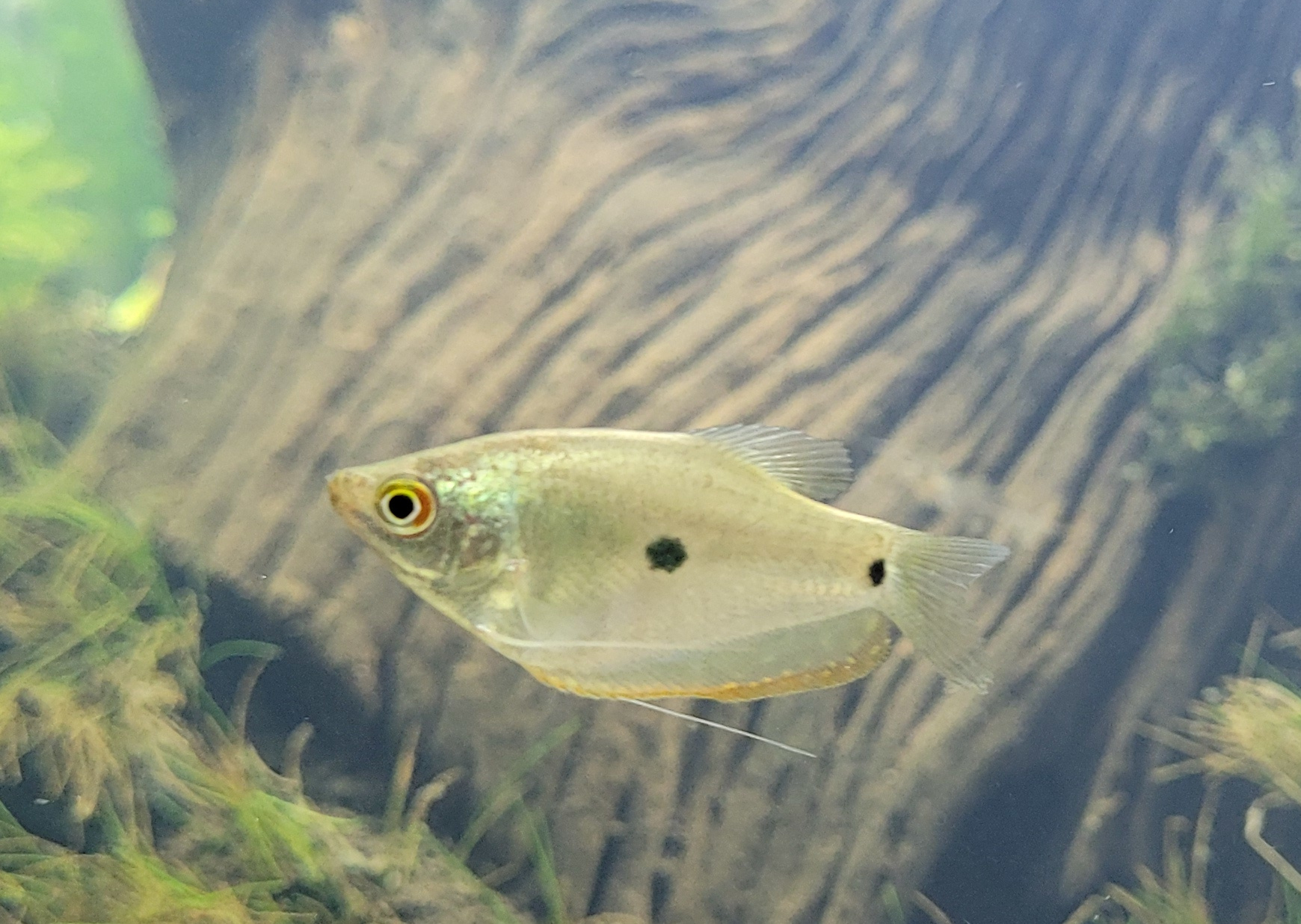
Juvenile three spot gourami from the Philippines

Differentiating between the male and female three spot gourami is by the dorsal fin. In the male, the dorsal fin is long and pointed and the anal fin is pointed, while the female's are shorter and rounded. However, some females may have a dorsal fin as long as the male's. When ready to breed, the male builds a bubble nest and then begins to entice the female by swimming back and forth, flaring his fins and raising his tail. The female may lay up to 800 eggs. After spawning, the females often are removed to a separate aquarium as the male may become aggressive toward her. The male protects the eggs and fry, but normally is removed after they become free-swimming. After hatching, frequent water changes, especially during the third week, are used to ensure the health of the fry, as this is when the labyrinth organ is developing.

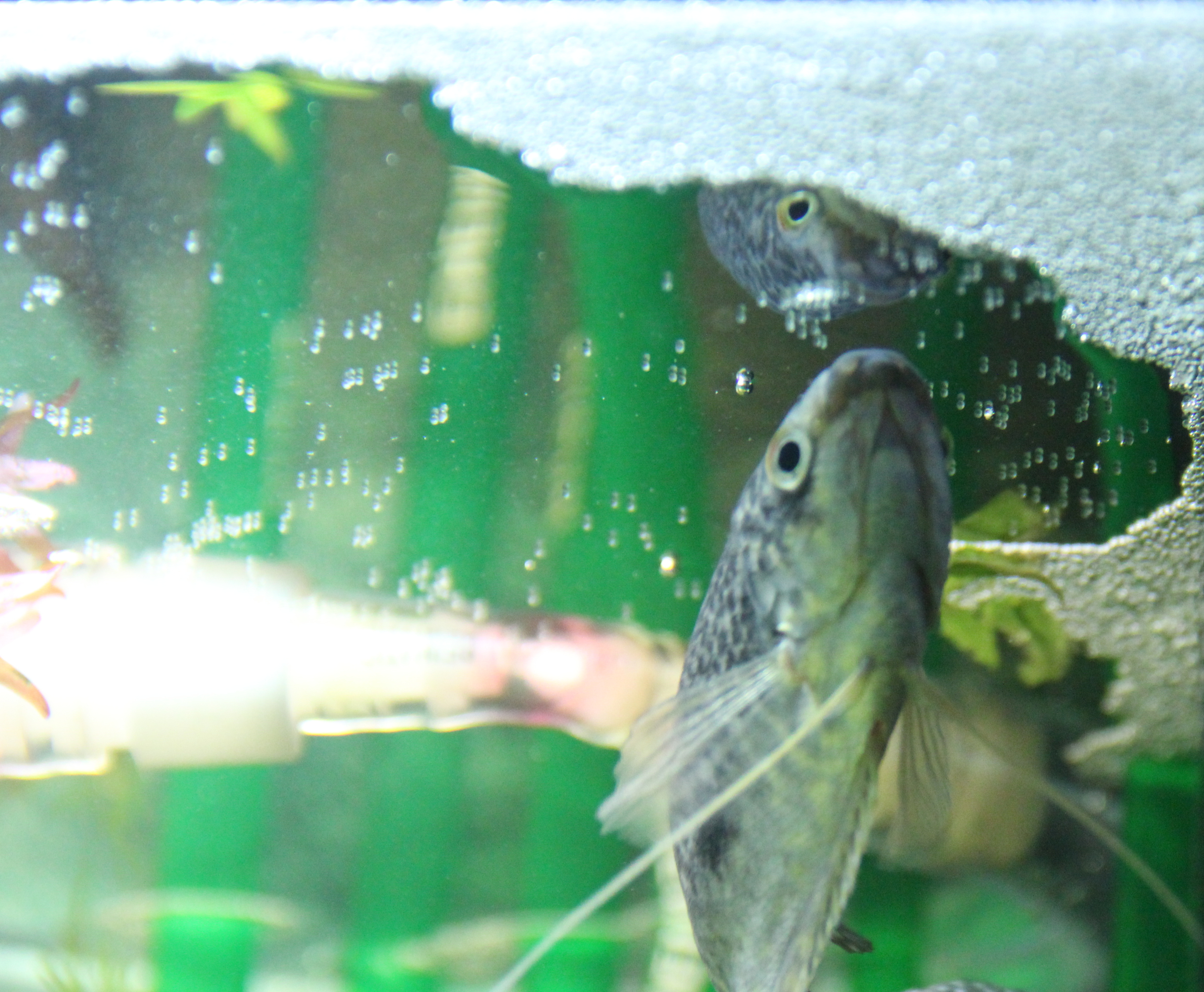
Male with bubble nest

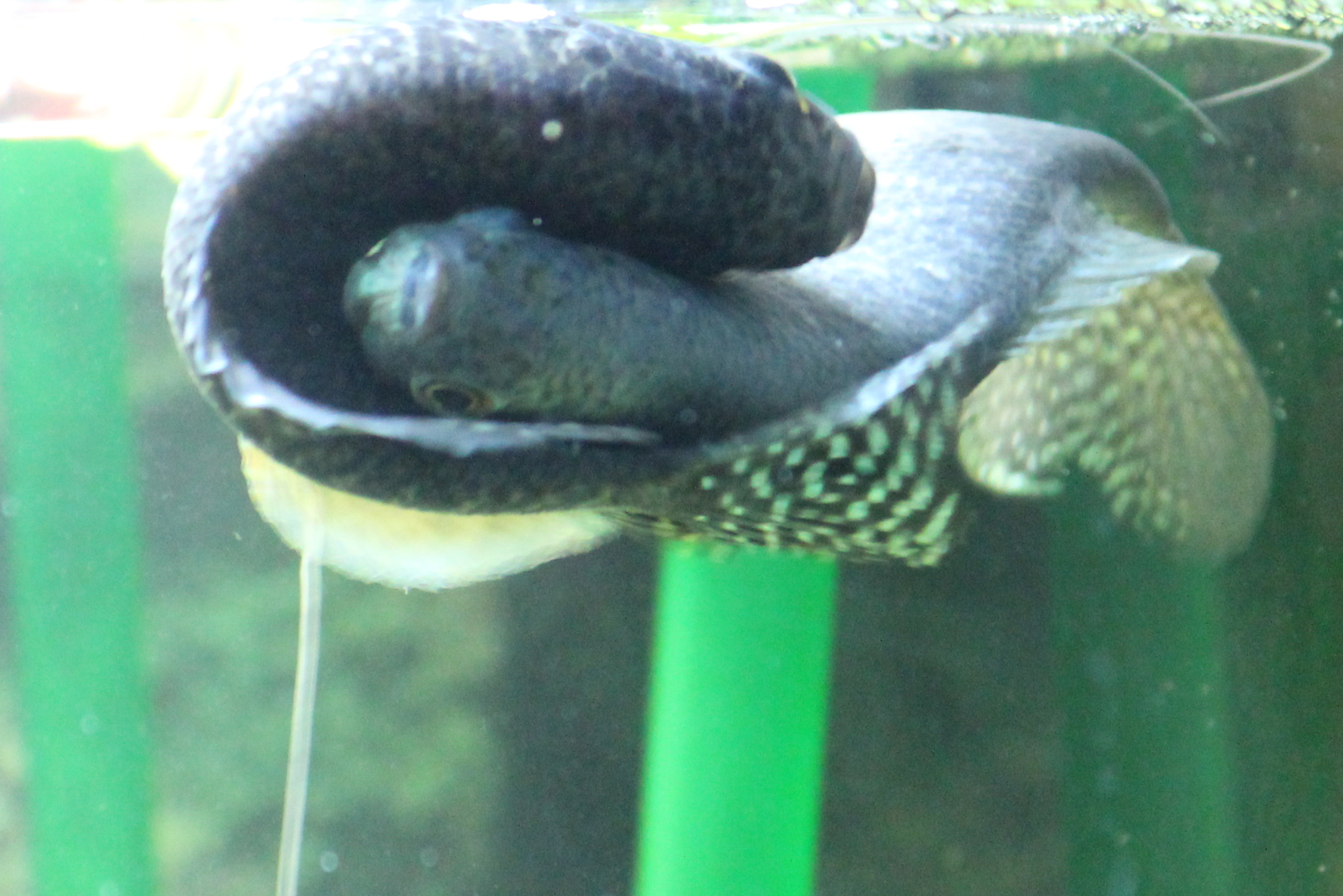
Mating

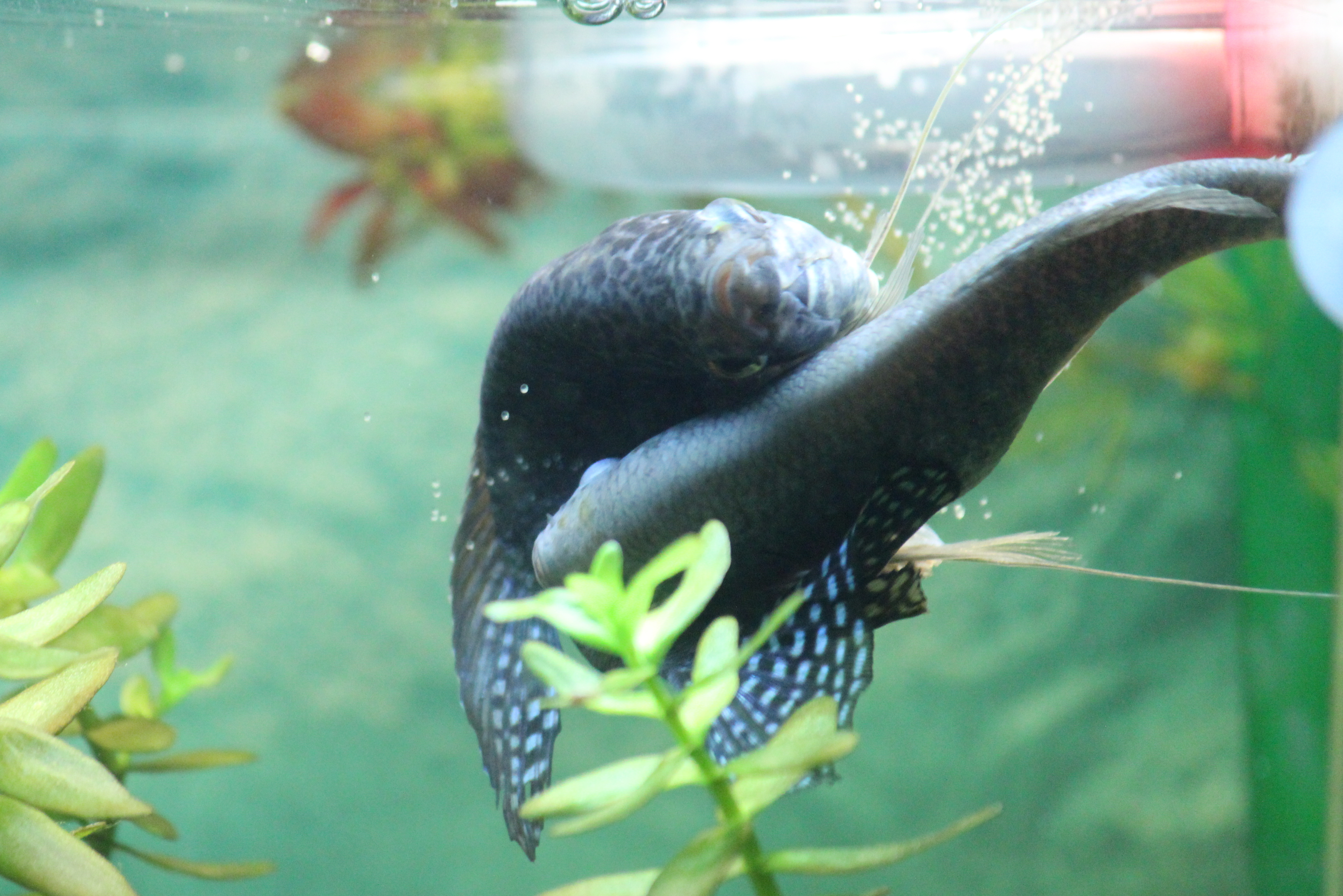
Spawning

== Color ==
Three spot gourami are known to change color (their black spots will fade) when under high stress or when they are not kept under good conditions. Healthy fish have two vivid black spots on each side of their bodies, but these fade with age. Selectively bred varieties most commonly available in the aquarium trade are opaline (or opal) (with a marbled pattern), platinum (or silver) (whitish), blue, golden (or gold) (xanthochromistic), and lavender (or amethyst) (the result of crossing a blue and golden, having a purple coloration).

=== Varieties ===
Gold and blue gourami

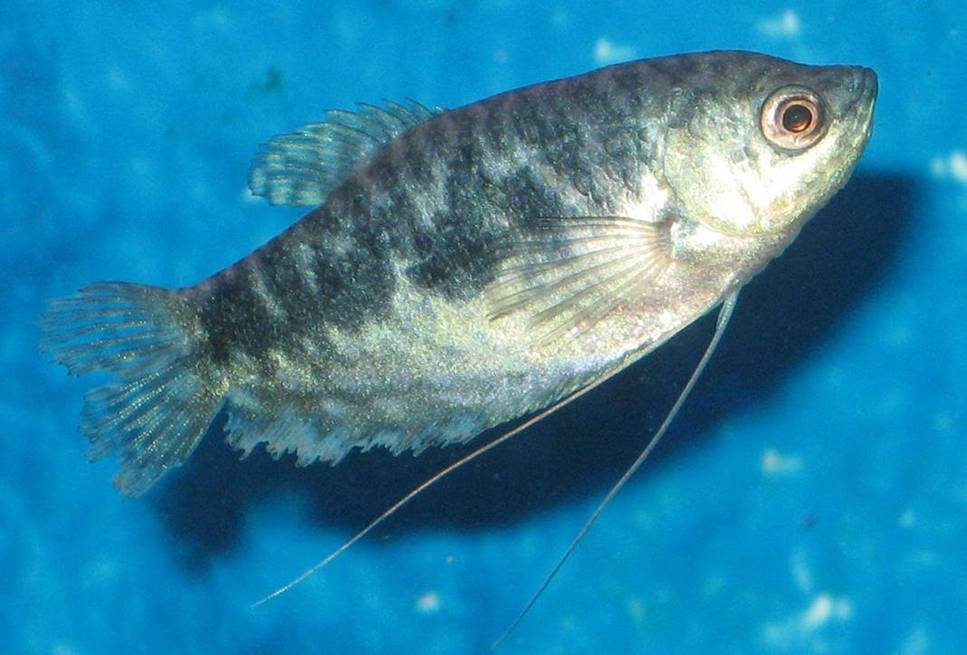
Opaline gourami with nipped fins

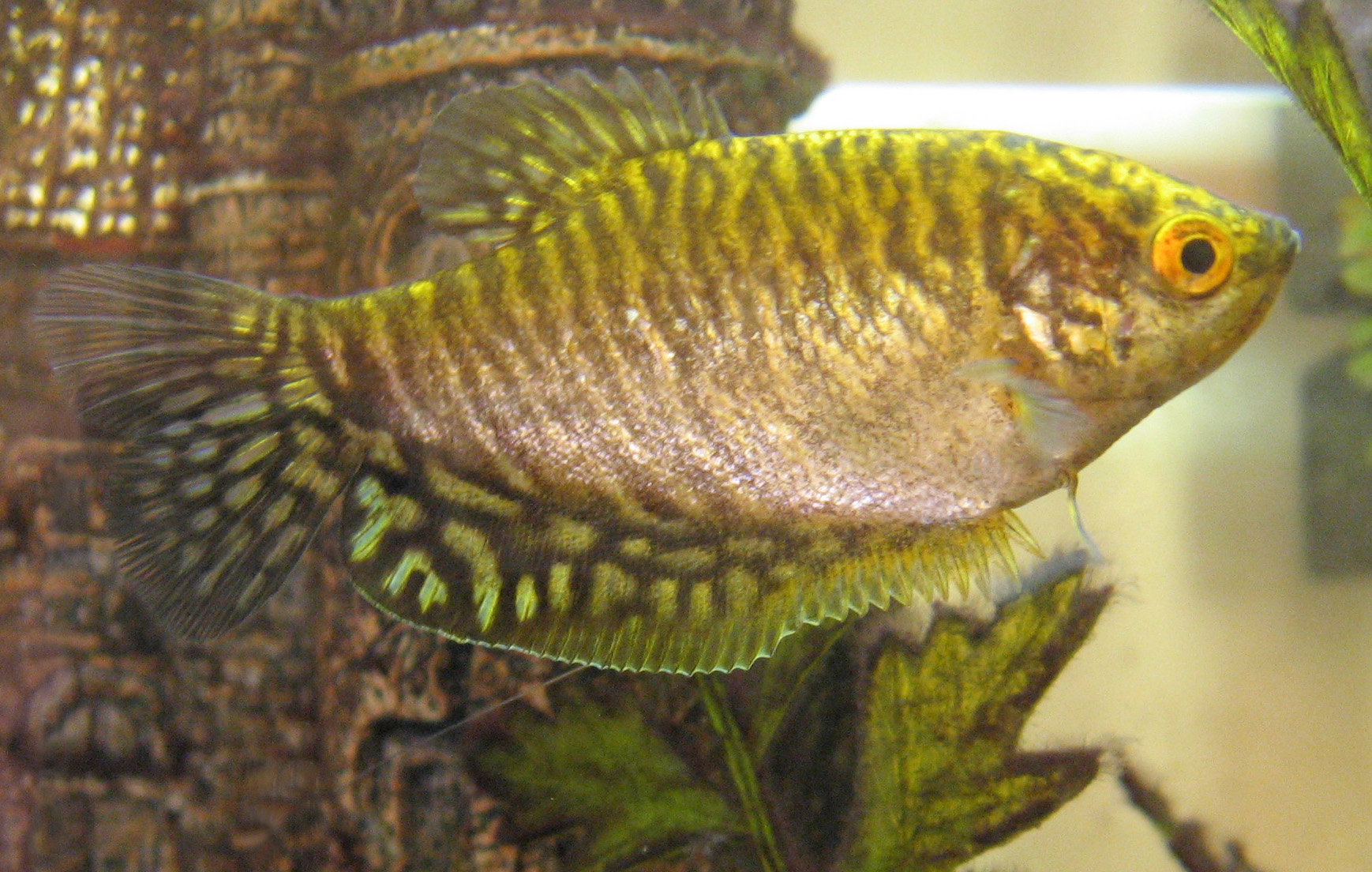
A "golden" variety, often sold as simply "golden gourami"
