= Paul Matte =

German ichthyologist and fish breeder

- Born: 1854
- Died: 1922; Berlin, Germany
- Occupation(s): ichthyologist, fish breeder
- Years active: 1850-1922
- Known for: pioneer in the importing and breeding of aquarium fishes
- Notable work: First importer and breeder of goldfish, Paradise fish and Siamese fighting fish in Germany.

Paul Matte (1854–1922) was a German tropical fish expert, importer, and fish breeder, and was a pioneer in the importing and breeding of the first tropical fish species to reach Europe. He lived in Berlin-Lankwitz, Germany.

In 1866 he imported the first goldfish (Carassius auratus) to Germany from Japan, and the offspring were referred to as the "Matte-strain".

He was the first to breed the paradise fish and Siamese fighting fish in Germany.

In 1896 he imported ten pairs of Siamese fighting fish (Betta splendens) to Germany from Moscow, from the strain bred by Pierre Carbonnier in France.

In 1897 he imported and bred the first specimens of the banded gourami (Trichogaster fasciata) to Europe.

In 1905 he imported the first zebrafish (Danio rerio) to Europe.

Matte was the first to import both sexes of swordtail (Xiphophorus hellerii).

The characin Hemigrammus matei is named after Paul Matte, since he delivered the first specimens to the author Carl H. Eigenmann, who described the species in 1918.
