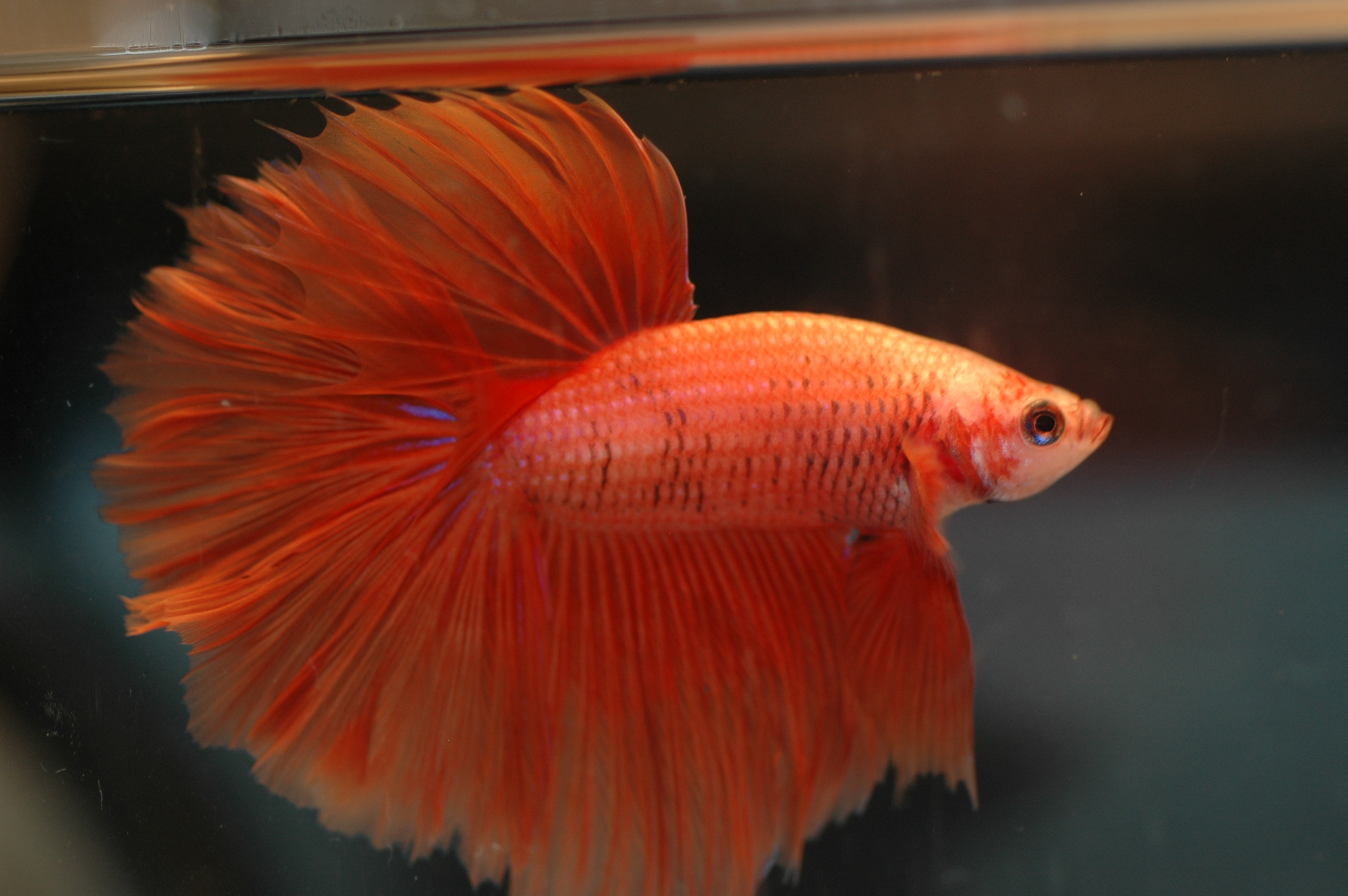
- Halfmoon male

Conservation status
- Vulnerable (IUCN 3.1)

Scientific classification
- Kingdom: Animalia
- Phylum: Chordata
- Class: Actinopterygii
- Division: Teleostei
- Order: Anabantiformes
- Family: Osphronemidae
- Genus: Betta
- Species: B. splendens

Binomial name
- Betta splendens Regan, 1910

= Siamese fighting fish =

Species of fish native to Southeast Asia

The Siamese fighting fish (Betta splendens), commonly known as the Siamese fighter, or locally as the betta, is a freshwater fish native to Mainland Southeast Asia, namely Cambodia, Laos, Myanmar, Malaysia, Thailand, and Vietnam. It is one of more than 70 species of the genus Betta, but the only one eponymously called "betta", owing to its global popularity as a pet; Betta splendens are among the most popular aquarium fish in the world, due to their diverse and colorful morphology and relatively low maintenance.

Betta fish are endemic to the central plain of Thailand, where they were first domesticated more than 1,000 years ago, among the earliest of any fish. They were initially bred for aggression and subject to gambling matches akin to cockfighting. Bettas became known outside Thailand through King Rama III (1788–1851), who is said to have given some to Theodore Cantor, a Danish physician, zoologist, and botanist. They first appeared in the West in the late 19th century, and within decades became popular as ornamental fish. B. splendens's long history of selective breeding has produced a wide variety of coloration and finnage, earning it the moniker "designer fish of the aquatic world".

Bettas are well known for being highly territorial, with males frequently engaging in aggressive interactions when kept together; without a means of escape, this usually results in the death of one or both fish. Female bettas can also become territorial toward one another in confined spaces. Bettas are exceptionally tolerant of low oxygen levels and poor water quality, owing to their special labyrinth organ, a characteristic unique to the suborder Anabantoidei that allows for the intake of surface air.

In addition to its worldwide popularity, the Siamese fighting fish is the national aquatic animal of Thailand, which remains the primary breeder and exporter of bettas for the global aquarium market. Despite their abundance as pets, in the wild, B. splendens is listed as "vulnerable" by the IUCN, due to increasing pollution and habitat destruction. Efforts are being made to support betta fish breeders in Thailand as a result of their popularity as pets, cultural significance, and need for conservation.

== Etymology ==
Outside Southeast Asia, the name "betta" is used specifically to describe B. splendens, despite the term scientifically applying to the entire genus, which includes B. splendens and dozens of other species. Betta splendens is more accurately called by its scientific name or "Siamese fighting fish" to avoid confusion with the other members of the genus.

English-speakers often pronounce betta as "bay-tuh", after the second letter in the Greek alphabet. However, it is believed the name is derived from the Malay word ikan betta, with ikan meaning "fish" and bettah referring to an ancient warrior tribe, which is pronounced "bet-tah". Alternative sources suggest the name Betta splendens is formed from two languages, consisting of Malay for "enduring fish" and the Latin word for shining.

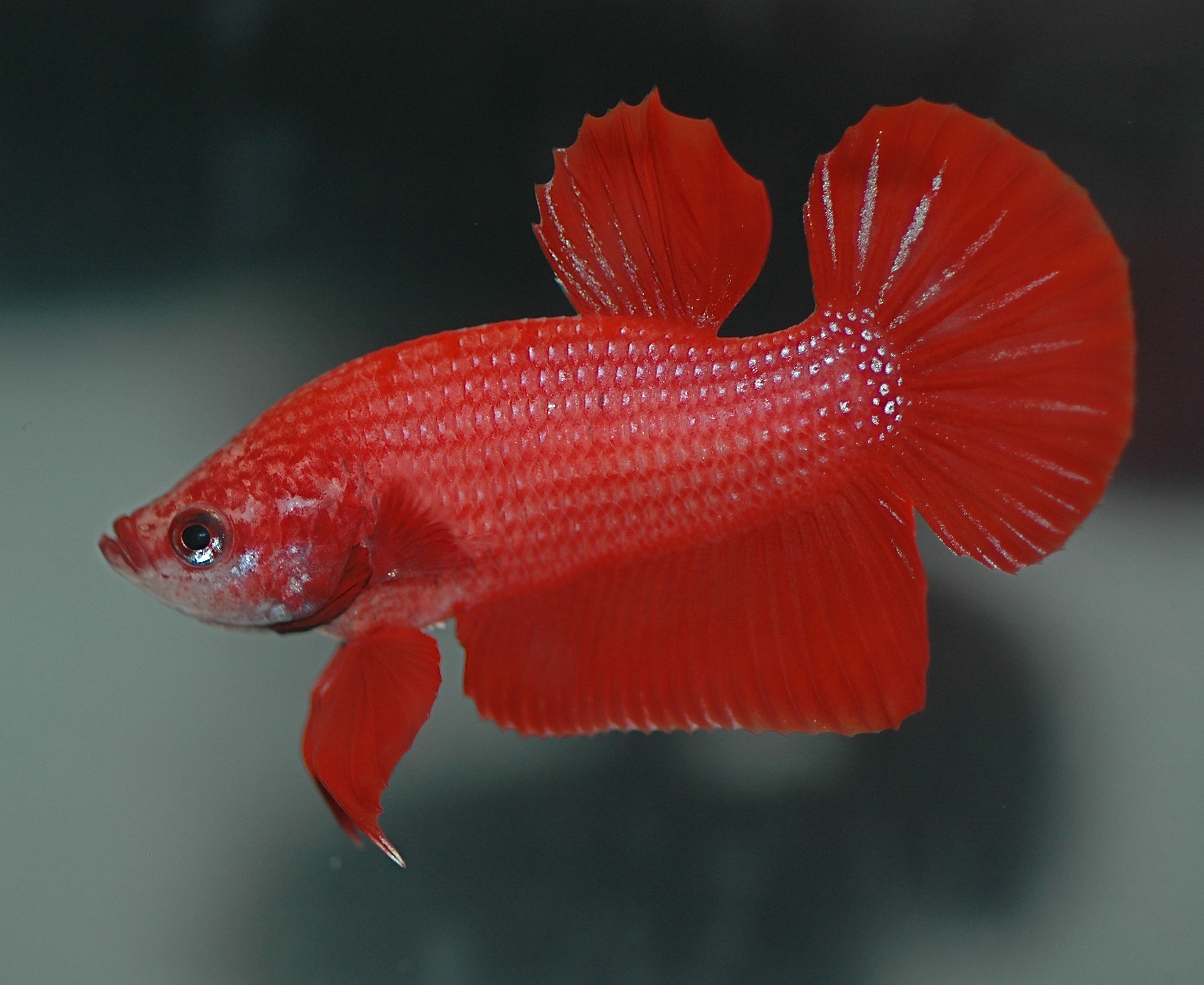
A red "plakat" male

Another vernacular name for Siamese fighting fish is plakat, often applied to the short-finned ornamental strains, which is derived from the Thai word pla kat (Thai: ปลากัด), which literally means "biting fish". This name is used in Thailand for all members of the Betta genus, which share similar aggressive tendencies, rather than for any specific strain of the Siamese fighting fish. Thus, the term "fighting fish" is used to generalise all Betta species besides the Siamese fighting fish.

Siamese fighting fish were originally given the scientific name Macropodus pugnax in 1849—literally "aggressive fish with big feet", likely in reference to their elongated pelvic fins. The genus Betta had been erected by the Dutch ichthyologist Pieter Bleeker in 1850, and Cantor's species was later recombined as Betta pugnax (Cantor, 1849)—a species now regarded as distinct from the Siamese fighting fish. Cantor's original description had inadvertently included more than one species of fighting fish; in a revision of the Asiatic labyrinth fishes published in 1910 (in a volume dated 1909), the British ichthyologist Charles Tate Regan separated the Siamese domesticated fish and described it as a new species, Betta splendens.

== Description ==
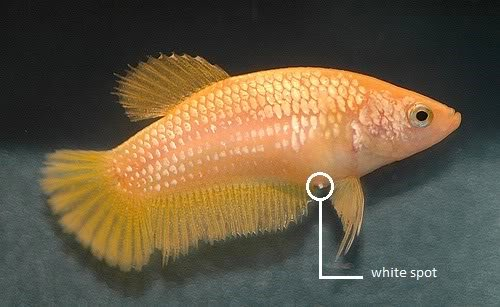
Female, showing the ovipositor tube

B. splendens usually grows to a length of about 6–8 cm (2.4–3.1 in). Although aquarium specimens are widely known for their brilliant colors and large, flowing fins, the natural coloration of B. splendens is generally green, brown and grey, while the fins are relatively short; wild fish exhibit strong colors only when agitated. In captivity, Siamese fighting fish have been selectively bred to display a vibrant array of colors and tail types. The variety of colors we see now in pet stores is a result of the domestication of the Betta splendens. Because pet stores are more likely to sell the visually striking bettas, those are the types of bettas the breeders continue to prioritize. The more natural colored bettas like green, brown, and grey may rarely be seen now in pet stores due to the overshadowing of the more visually appealing colors.

Male and female Betta splendens can look similar, but one way to distinguish between the two is to identify the ovipositor tube that's located in females used for egg delivery.

== Distribution and habitat ==
According to Witte and Schmidt (1992), Betta splendens is native to Southeast Asia, including the northern Malay Peninsula, central and eastern Thailand, Kampuchea (Cambodia), and southern Vietnam. According to Vidthayanon (2013), a Thai ichthyologist and senior researcher of biodiversity at WWF Thailand, the species is endemic to Thailand, from the Mae Khlong to Chao Phraya basins, the eastern slope of the Cardamom mountains (Cambodia), and from the Isthmus of Kra. Similarly, a report from Froese and Pauly (2019) identifies Betta splendens as native to Cambodia, Laos, Thailand, and Vietnam. They are also found throughout the neighbouring Malay Peninsula and in adjacent parts of Sumatra, likely due to human introduction.

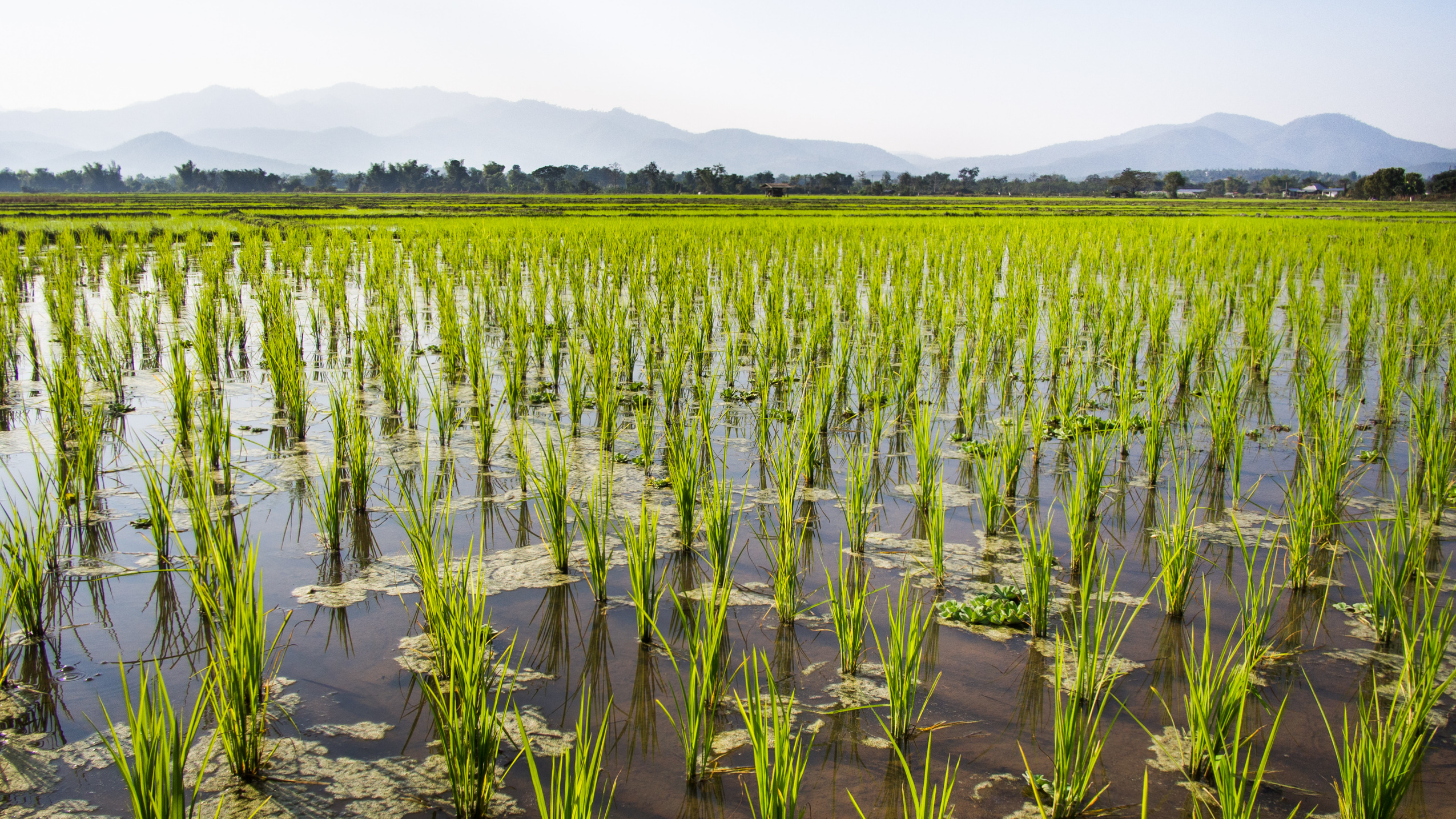
Rice paddies are believed to have been the first point of contact between bettas and humans.

Wherever they are found, Betta splendens generally inhabit shallow bodies of water with abundant vegetation, including marshes, floodplains, and paddy fields. The historic prevalence of rice farming across Southeast Asia, which provided an ideal habitat for bettas, led to their discovery and subsequent domestication by humans. The combination of shallow water and high air temperature causes gases to rapidly evaporate, leading to a significant deficit of oxygen in the betta's natural habitat. This environment likely led to the evolution of the lung-like labyrinth organ, which allows Siamese fighting fish—like all members of the suborder Anabantoidei—to breathe directly from the air. Subsequently, bettas can live and even thrive in harsher environments than other freshwater fish, which in turn leaves them with fewer natural predators and competitors. In the wild, bettas thrive at a fairly low population density of 1.7 individuals per square meter.

The tropical climate of the betta's natural habitat is characterized by sudden and extreme fluctuations in water availability, chemistry, and temperature. Water pH can range from slightly acidic (pH 6.9) to highly alkaline (pH 8.2), while air temperatures drop as low as 15 °C (59 °F) and rise as high as 40 °C (100 °F). Consequently, Siamese fighting fish are highly adaptable and durable, able to tolerate a variety of harsh or toxic environments; this accounts for their popularity as pets, as well as their ability to successfully colonize bodies of water all over the world.

Wild bettas prefer to live in bodies of water teeming with aquatic vegetation and surface foliage, such as fallen leaves and water lilies. The abundance of plants provides security from predators and a buffer between aggressive males, who coexist by claiming dense sections of plants as territory. Such vegetation also offers protection to females during spawning and to fry during their earliest and most vulnerable stages.

=== Invasive species ===
The betta's worldwide popularity has led to its release and home in similarly tropical areas, including southeast Australia, Brazil, Colombia, the Dominican Republic, the southeast United States, and Singapore.

In January 2014, a large population of bettas was discovered in the Adelaide River Floodplain in the Northern Territory, Australia. As an invasive species, they pose a threat to native fish, frogs, and other wetland wildlife. Bettas have also become established in subtropical areas of the United States, namely southern Texas and Florida, although an assessment by the U.S. Fish and Wildlife Service noted that while the climate match for this species within the United States is low, no studies have been done to assess the effect of this species upon the invaded range.

=== Conservation status ===
Due to their popularity, Siamese fighting fish are highly abundant in captivity. In the wild, betta habitats are threatened by chemical and agricultural run off, in addition to the contamination of human medication residue into aquatic ecosystems from the sewage system. Such contamination can also alter the reproductive behavior of the species by decreasing hatch rate and increasing the likelihood of fathers eating their own eggs. Due to the expansion of palm oil plantation in Southeast Asia, wild bettas are also facing habitat loss. The primary threats are habitat destruction and pollution, caused by urban and agricultural development across central Thailand. Wild specimens are categorized by the IUCN as vulnerable, indicating the species is likely to become endangered without conservation efforts.

== Diet ==
Betta splendens is naturally carnivorous, feeding on zooplankton, small crustaceans, and the larvae of aquatic insects such as mosquito as well as insects that have fallen into the water and algae. Contrary to some marketing materials in the pet trade, bettas cannot subsist solely on vegetation or the roots of plants.

Although Betta splendens is carnivorous, there are factors that affect juvenile health, such as limited ability for carbohydrate digestion. This can occur in young Betta splendens because their intestines are a lot shorter and their carbohydrate digestive enzymes are not as active as adult bettas. Bettas can also adhere to a diet including rotifers, infusorians, and water fleas, but some of these organisms are derived from avian and porcine farms that can cause diseases, potentially harming the bettas. Even though carbohydrates from a carnivorous diet are essential for maturation in bettas, research on betta health has provided alternatives for food other than their typical diet. Some of these alternatives include microwave cooking, digestive enzyme supplementation, and probiotics, some of which may be found in betta fish food in pet stores.

== Reproduction and early development ==
If interested in a female, male bettas flare their gills, spread their fins, and twist their bodies in a dance-like performance. Receptive females respond by darkening in color and developing vertical lines known as "breeding bars". Males build bubble nests of various sizes and thicknesses at the surface of the water, which interested females may examine. Most do this regularly even if there is no female present.

Plants or rocks that break the surface often form a base for bubble nests. During courtship, the male betta may exhibit aggressive behavior toward the female by acts of chasing or nipping at her fins. The act of spawning itself is called a "nuptial embrace", for the male wraps his body around the female; around 10–40 eggs are released during each embrace, until the female is exhausted of eggs. With each deposit of eggs through the female's ovipositor, the male releases milt into the water, which fertilizes the eggs as they get released. The males can fertilize these eggs every minute for 1–4 hours while females can release anywhere between 12 and 492 eggs at a time. During and after spawning, the male uses his mouth to retrieve sinking eggs and place them in the bubble nest; during mating some females assist their partner, but more often simply devour all the eggs she manages to catch. Once the female has released all of her eggs, she is chased away from the male's territory, as she would likely eat the eggs. If she is not removed from the tank, she would likely be killed by the male.After mating, females need at least four weeks to rest before mating again. Mating earlier than four weeks can result in no eggs or eggs that are incapable of developing into live offspring. Males require a week or so before they can continue fertilizing eggs.

The eggs remain in the male's care. He carefully keeps them in his bubble nest, making sure none fall to the bottom, repairing the bubble nest as needed. Incubation lasts for 24–36 hours; newly hatched larvae remain in the nest for the next two to three days until their yolk sacs are fully absorbed. Afterward, the fry leave the nest and the free-swimming stage begins. In this first period of their lives, B. splendens fry are totally dependent on their gills; the labyrinth organ, which allows the species to breathe atmospheric oxygen, typically develops at three to six weeks of age, depending on the general growth rate, which can be highly variable. B. splendens can reach sexual maturity in as early as 4–5 months. Typically, the morphological differences between males and females can be noticed around two months after hatching. During development, betta fry can be fed either commercial artificial feeds, or live moving prey, which tends to be favored more. Examples of live feed for betta fry include baby brine shrimp, water fleas, and mosquito larvae. Although common fed to fish fry, boiled egg yolks are not preferred by the fish.

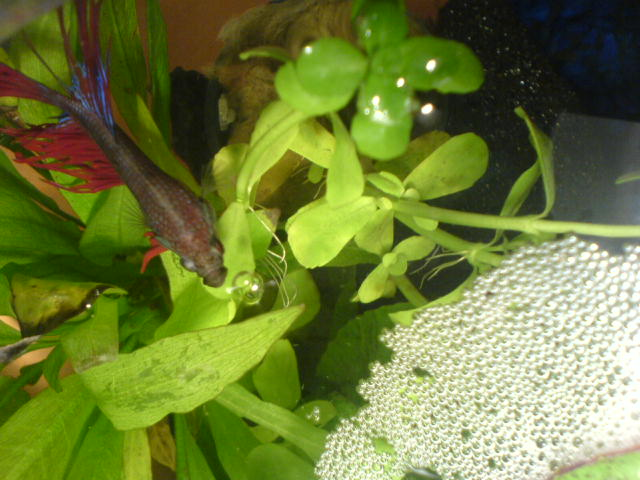
Betta male building a bubble nest

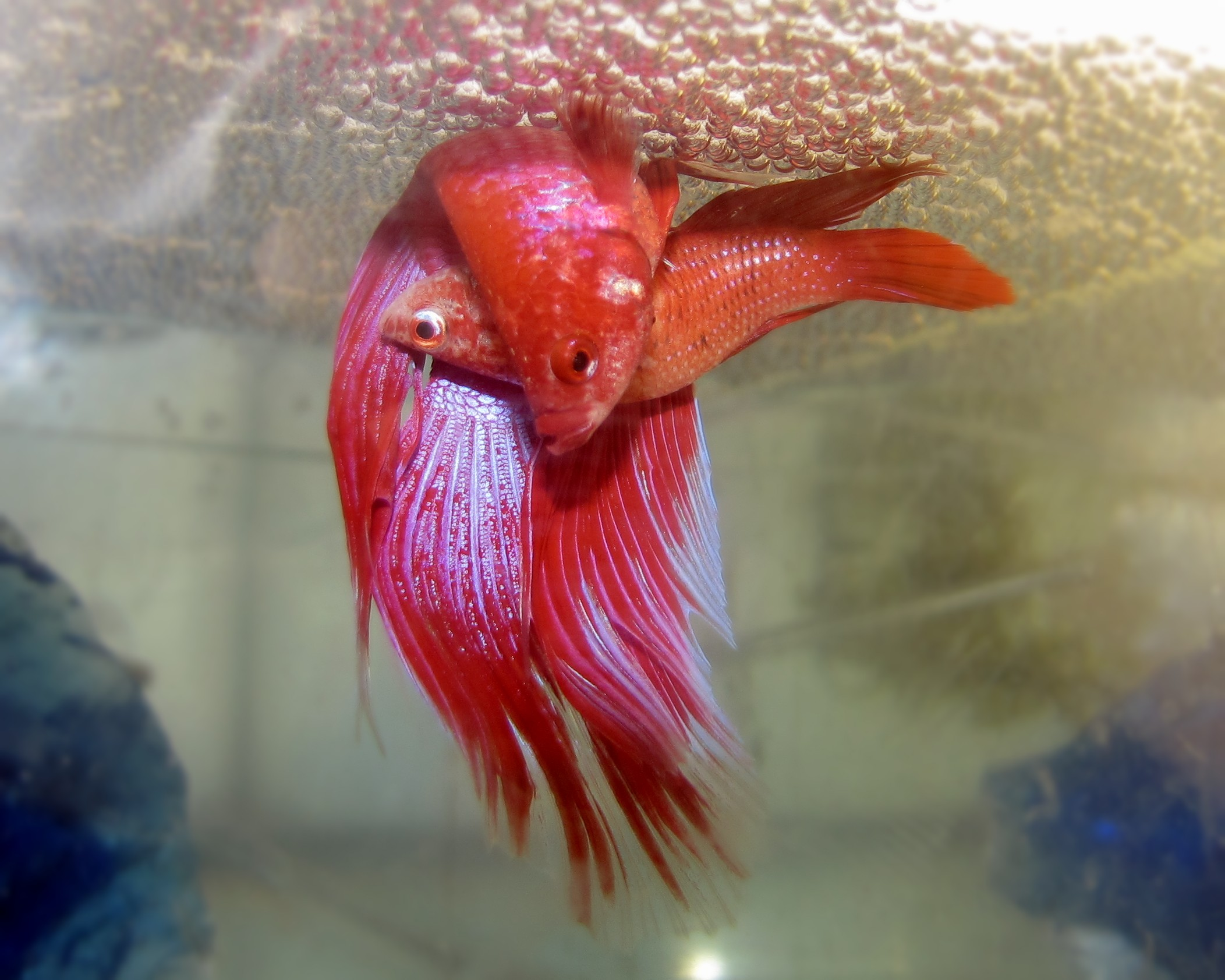
Spawning under a bubble nest in a breeder's tank

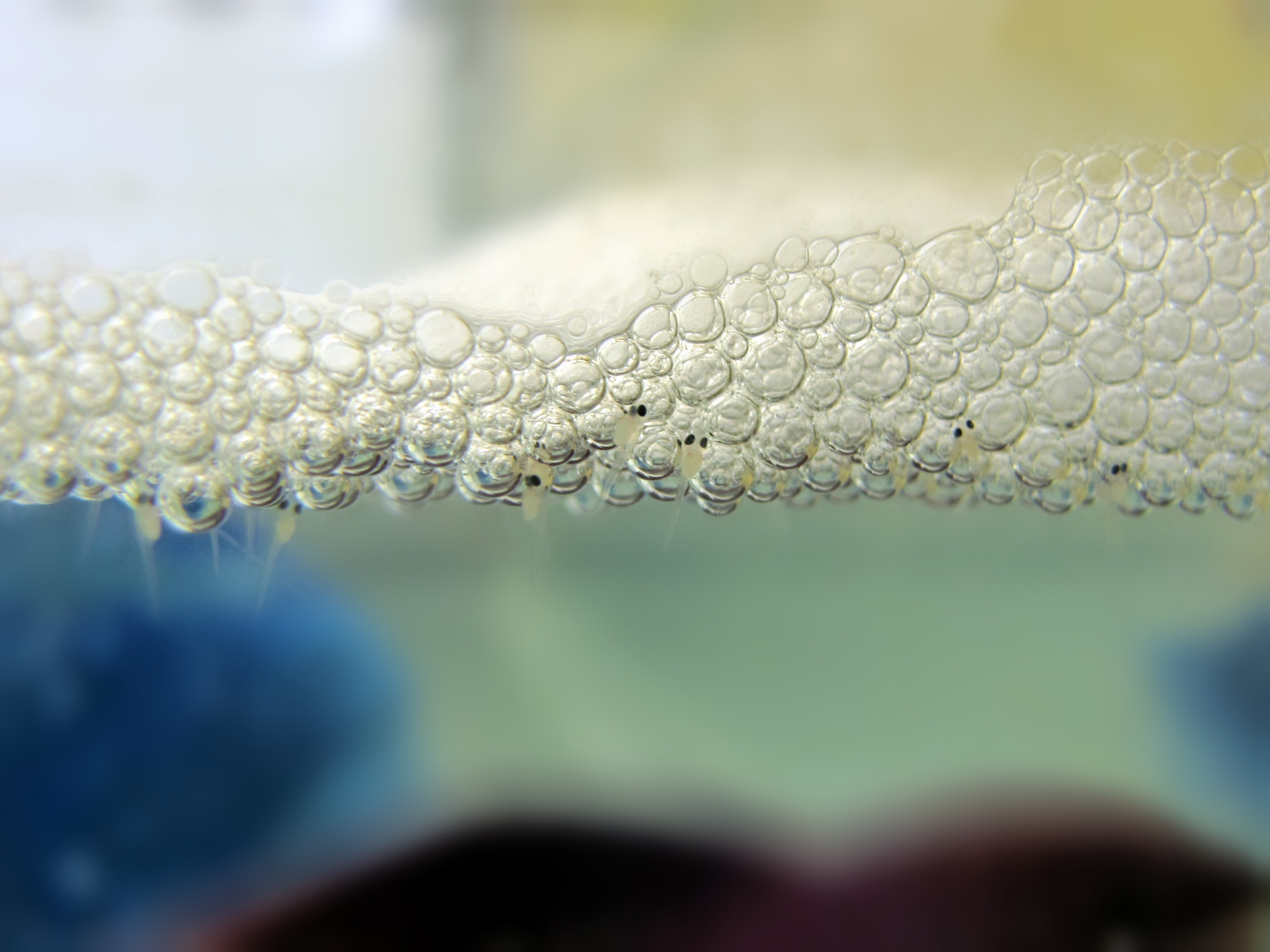
One-day-old fry (their yolk sacs have not yet been absorbed) in a bubble nest

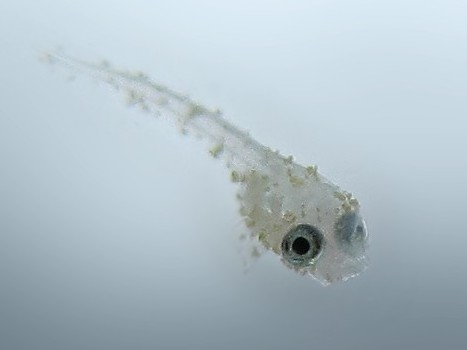
A 15-day-old, free-swimming fry is infected with Piscinoodinium sp. (velvet), a common killer of betta fry in captivity.

== History ==
Information on precisely how and when Siamese fighting fish were first domesticated and brought out of Asia is sparse. Genetic analysis implies domestication at least 1,000 years ago. Additional evidence from DNA sampling suggests bettas may have been bred for fighting since the 13th century. Over time, this led to the diverse genetics of modern domestic and wild bettas.

=== Fighting fish ===
Some people in Malaysia and Thailand are known to have collected wild bettas at least by the 19th century, observing their aggressive nature and pitting them against each other in gambling matches akin to cockfights. In the wild, betta spar for only a few minutes before one fish retreats; domesticated betta, namely Plakat bettas, are bred specifically for heightened aggression, and can engage for much longer, with winners determined by a willingness to continue fighting; once a fish retreats, the match is over. Fights to the death were rare, so bets were placed on the bravery of the fish rather than its survival. Due to the difference in genetics from domesticated bettas being originally bred for fighting, captive ornamental species tends to be more aggressive than wild betta species.

The popularity of these fights garnered the attention of the king of Siam (Thailand), who regulated and taxed the matches and collected fighting fish of his own. In 1840, he gave some of his prized fish to Danish physician Theodore Edward Cantor, who worked in the Bengal medical service. Nine years later, Cantor published the first recorded article describing these fish, giving them the name Macropodus pugnax. In 1909, British ichthyologist Charles Tate Regan found there was a related species already named Macropodus pugnax, and thus renamed the domesticated Siamese fighting fish, Betta splendens, or "splendid fighter".

=== Aquarium fish ===
Betta splendens first entered the Western aquarium trade in the late 19th century; the earliest known arrival is 1874 in France, when French aquaria expert and ichthyologist Pierre Carbonnier began importing and breeding several specimens. In 1896, German tropical fish expert Paul Matte brought the first specimens into Germany from Moscow, most likely from the strain developed by Carbonnier. This indicates bettas were already somewhat established in France and Russia by the turn of the 20th century. Fighting fish were also present in Australia by 1904, based on an article written by British-born zoologist Edgar Ravenswood Waite and published by the Australian Museum in Sydney. Waite indicates that Australian specimens were brought from Penang, Malaysia, near the border with Thailand. He also makes reference to two articles about "fighting fish" published by Carbonnier in 1874 and 1881. Bettas may have first entered the United States in 1910, via importers in California; there is also evidence they were imported in 1927 from Cambodia.

While it is unclear when bettas became popular in the aquarium trade, the early 20th century marked the first known departure from centuries of breeding bettas for aggression, to instead selecting for color, finnage, and overall beauty for ornamental purposes. In 1927, an article was published in Germany describing the long, flowing fins of the "veiltail" breed, which indicates an emphasis on aesthetic beauty. In the 1950s, an American breeder created a larger and longer-finned veiltail, while around 1960, Indian breeders discovered a genetic mutation that allowed for two caudal fins, producing the "doubletail" variety. Within that decade, a German breeder created the "deltatail" characterized by its broader, triangular fins.

In 1967, a group of betta breeders formed the International Betta Congress (IBC), the first formal interest group dedicated to Siamese fighting fish. The IBC aimed to breed varieties that would be healthier and more symmetrical in fins and body shape, with an emphasis on animal welfare.

== Behaviour and intelligence ==
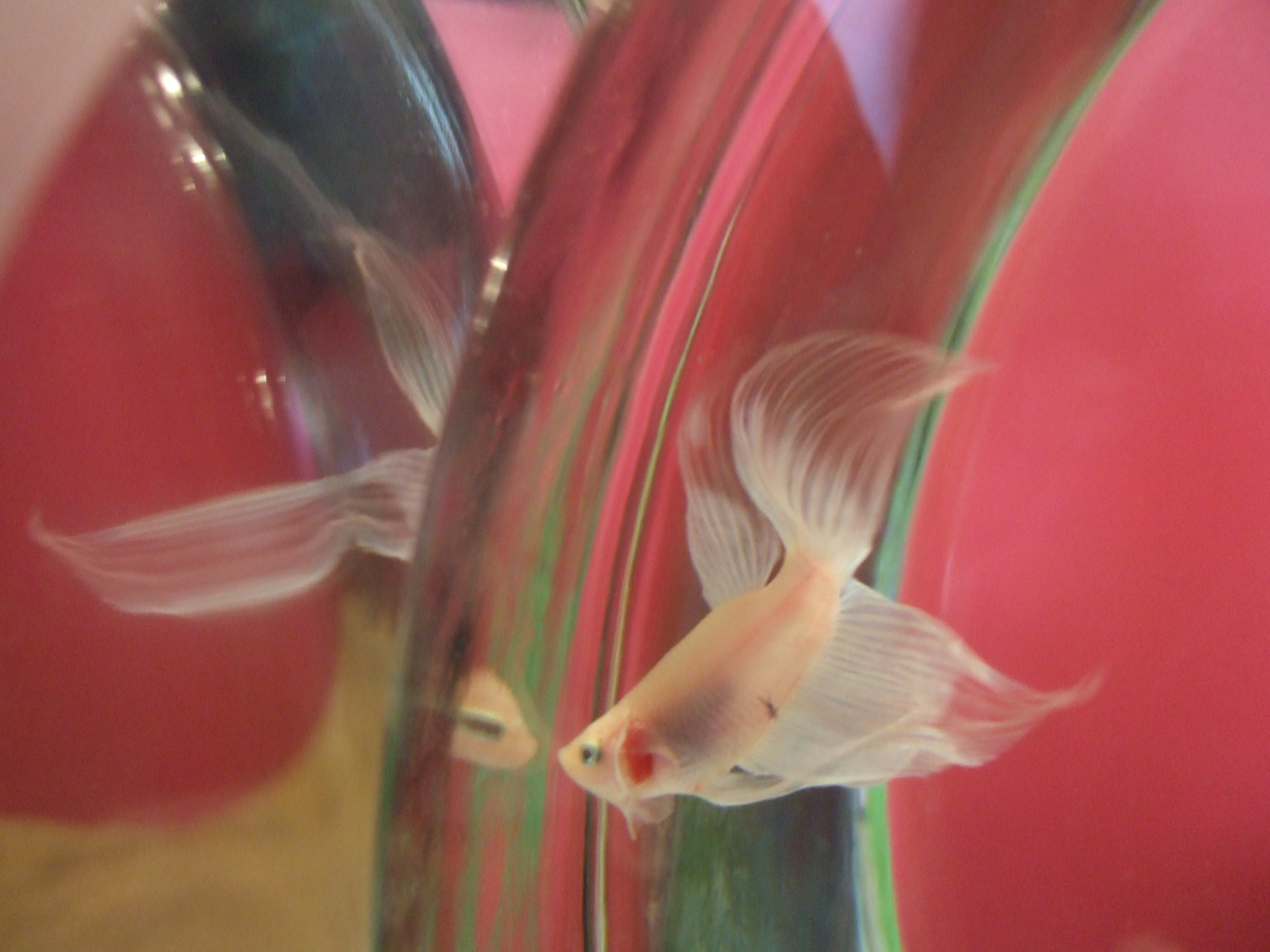
A male attacking and flaring at his reflection in a mirror

Siamese fighting fish display complex behavioural patterns and social interactions, which vary among individual specimens. Research indicates they are capable of associative learning, in which they adopt a consistent response following exposure to new stimuli. These characteristics have made bettas subject to intensive study by ethologists, neurologists, and comparative psychologists.

Males and females flare or puff out their gill covers (opercula) to appear more impressive, either to intimidate other rivals or as an act of courtship. Flaring also occurs when they are intimidated by movement or a change of scene in their environments. In captivity, bettas can be seen flaring at their own reflection because they do not pass the mirror test for self-recognition. Both sexes display pale horizontal bars if stressed or frightened. However, such color changes, common in females of any age, are rare in mature males due to their intensity of color. Females often flare at other females, especially when setting up a pecking order. Flirting fish behave similarly, with vertical instead of horizontal stripes indicating a willingness and readiness to breed.

Betta splendens enjoy a decorated tank, as they seek to establish territory even when housed alone. They may set up a territory centered on a plant or rocky alcove, sometimes becoming highly possessive of it and aggressive toward trespassing rivals; consequently, bettas, if housed with other fish, require at least 45 litres (about 10 gallons). Contrary to popular belief, bettas are compatible with many other species of aquarium fish. Given the proper parameters, bettas are aggressive only toward smaller and slower fish than themselves, such as guppies.

Betta aggression has historically made them objects of gambling; with bets placed on two male fish pitted against each other to fight. Combat is characterized by fin nipping, flared gills, extended fins, and intensified color. The fight continues until one participant is submissive or tries to retreat; one or both fish may die depending on the seriousness of their injuries, though bettas rarely intend to fight to the death. To avoid fights over territory, male Siamese fighting fish are best isolated from one another. Males occasionally respond aggressively even to their own reflections. Though this is obviously safer than exposing the fish to another male, prolonged sight of their reflection may lead to stress in some individuals. Not all Siamese fighting fish respond negatively to other males, especially if the tank is large enough for each fish to create their own designated territory.

=== Aggression in females ===
In general, studies have shown that females exhibit similar aggressive behaviours to males, albeit less frequently and intensely. An observational study examined a group of female Siamese fighting fish over a period of two weeks, during which time they were recorded attacking, flaring, and biting food. This indicated that when females are housed in small groups, they form a stable dominance order, or "pecking order". For example, the fish ranked at the top showed higher levels of mutual displays, in comparison to the fish who were of lower ranks. The researchers also found that the duration of the displays differed depending on whether an attack occurred. The results of this research suggest that female Siamese fighting fish warrant as much scientific study as males, as they seem to have variations in their behaviours as well.

=== Courtship behaviour ===
There has been much research in the courtship behaviour between male and female Siamese fighting fish. Studies generally focus on the aggressive behaviours of males during the courtship process. For example, one study found that when male fish are in the bubble nest phase, their aggression toward females is quite low. This is due to the males attempting to attract potential mates to their nest, so eggs can successfully be laid. It has also been found that in determining a suitable mate, females often "eavesdrop" on pairs of males that are fighting. When a female witnesses aggressive behaviour between males, she is more likely to be attracted to the male who won. In contrast, if a female did not "eavesdrop" on a fight between males, she shows no preference in mate choice. In regards to the males, the "loser" is more likely to attempt to court the fish who did not "eavesdrop", while the "winner" showed no preference between females who "eavesdropped" and those who did not.

One study considered the ways in which male Siamese fighting fish alter their behaviours during courtship when another male is present. During this experiment, a dummy female was placed in the tank. The researchers expected that males would conceal their courtship from intruders; instead, when another male fish was present, the male was more likely to engage in courtship behaviours with the dummy female fish. When no barriers were present, the males were more likely to engage in gill flaring at an intruder male fish. The researchers concluded that the male was attempting to court the female and communicate with its rival at the same time. These results indicate the importance of considering courtship behaviour, as the literature has suggested there are many factors that can dramatically affect the ways in which both male and females can act in courtship settings.

=== Metabolic costs of aggression ===
Studies have found that Siamese fighting fish often begin with behaviours that require high cost, and gradually decrease their behaviours as the encounter proceeds. This indicates that Siamese fighting fish first begin an encounter using much metabolic energy, but gradually decrease, to avoid expending too much energy, thus making the encounter a waste if the fish is not successful. Similarly, researchers have found that when pairs of male Siamese fighting fish were kept together in the same tank for a three-day period, aggressive behaviour was most prevalent during the mornings of the first two days of their cohabitation. However, the researchers observed that the fighting between the two males decreased as the day progressed. The male in the dominant position initially had metabolic advantage; although as the experiment progressed, both fish became equal in regards to metabolic advantages. In regards to oxygen consumption, one study found that when two male bettas fought, the metabolic rates of both fish did not differ before or during the fight. However, the fish who won showed higher oxygen consumption during the evening following the fight. This indicates that aggressive behaviour in the form of fighting has long-lasting effects on metabolism.

=== Behavioural effects of chemical exposure ===
Siamese fighting fish are popular models for studying the neurological and physiological impact of certain chemicals, such as hormones, since their aggression is the result of cell signalling and possibly genes.

One study investigated the effect of testosterone on female Siamese fighting fish. Females were given testosterone, which resulted in changes to fin length, body coloration and gonads that resembled typical male fish. Their aggressive behaviour was found to be elevated when interacting with other females, but reduced when interacting with males. The researchers then allowed the females to interact with a control group of unaltered females; when the female fish stopped receiving testosterone, those who were exposed to the normal females still exhibited male-typical behaviours. In contrast, the female fish who were kept isolated did not continue to exhibit the male typical behaviours after testosterone was discontinued.

Another study exposed male Siamese fighting fish to endocrine-disrupting chemicals. The researchers were curious if exposure to these chemicals would affect the ways in which females respond to the exposed males. It was found that when shown videos of the exposed males, the females favoured those who were not exposed to the endocrine-disrupting chemicals, and avoided those males that were exposed. The researchers concluded that exposure to these chemicals can negatively affect the mating success of male Siamese fighting fish.

A psychology study used male Siamese fighting fish to investigate the effects of fluoxetine, an SSRI used primarily as an antidepressant in humans. Siamese fighting fish were selected as prime models due to having comparable serotonin transporter pathways, which accounts for their aggression. It was found that when exposed to fluoxetine, male Siamese fighting fish exhibited less aggressive behaviour than is characteristic of their species. Similarly, research has found that bettas are responsive to serotonin, dopamine, and GABA.

Another commonly prescribed drug that can affect Betta splendens' behavior is metformin, which is a drug doctors prescribe to treat people with type II diabetes. Metformin can enter freshwater and wastewater areas because it does not always get fully broken down in humans, and whatever does not get fully metabolized is usually excreted through urine or feces. When metformin makes its way through the sewage systems and into betta habitats, over time it reduces the aggression of the male bettas. The longer the male bettas are exposed to concentrated metformin, the more their aggression diminishes. With decreased energy and aggression, the bettas' fitness can decline.

=== Sleep behavior ===
Betta fish can exhibit unusual sleep behaviors, often resulting in new betta owners assuming that their betta fish has died. In an aquarium, betta fish sleep anywhere in the tank they feel comfortable, including at the bottom on the substrate, floating at the mid-level, or at the surface. Betta fish sleep on their side, upside down, with their nose pointing up, or with their tail pointing up. They are also known to curl up or wedge between tight spaces, such as behind a heater. One of the more unusual sleep behaviors that betta fish exhibit is their ability to sleep out of the water, resting on a leaf or any other flat object protruding from the water. This is made possible by the betta's labyrinth organ, which acts like a human lung, pulling oxygen from the air instead of from the water. When betta fish sleep, their bright colors often fade, and when combined with their unusual napping positions, they can appear dead. Predatory fish often avoid eating a dead fish because of the risk of contracting diseases and parasites, making this an excellent defensive mechanism.

== Genetics ==
Despite its commercial popularity, little is known about the Betta splendens genome. Current understanding is so limited that there is little evidence for the genetic basis of basic traits, including sex determination. A 2021 review article argued for increased scientific investigation into the genome of the Siamese fighting fish, and listed several areas of interest which are paraphrased below:

1. monophyly of the genus Betta including a single-versus-multiple origin of mouthbrooding;
2. the state of cryptic diversity and evolutionary forces driving speciation in the betta lineage;
3. responsive genes or genetic interaction to parental care, behavioural aggression, pigmentation, and other betta biology; and
4. preservation technology for betta as insurance against accidental loss of biodiversity this century.

Additionally, betta fish have been used in several studies to assess the impacts of various environmental contaminants, including oil. Improved understanding of the betta genome would allow for more accurate generalisations from these studies. Lastly, the betta fish is an excellent candidate for a model organism, particularly for aggression and pigmentation development, due to their extreme phenotypes in these areas.

Currently, the complete B. splendens chromosomal and mitochondrial genomes have been sequenced.Both genomes have yet to be annotated, though a roadmap for future efforts has been outlined. Notably, the mitochondrial genome for the peaceful betta, P. imbellis, has also been sequenced, potentially allowing for meaningful comparison between species in the future.

=== Phylogeny and cryptic diversity ===
There are many species in the genus Betta, the majority of which are morphologically similar. Within Thailand alone, there are twelve nominal species, with new species being discovered every 5–10 years. Past efforts to differentiate Betta species have been based on observable morphology, but given their visible similarity, this approach has masked much of the cryptic diversity in the genus. Recent speciation efforts have included use of DNA barcoding to differentiate species, specifically comparing the CO1 gene of the mitochondrial genome, resulting in new theories about the relatedness between species and allowing for the construction of new phylogenetic trees.

The morphological similarity between species that can be distinguished genetically suggests that species radiation with cryptic diversity occurred in the Betta lineage. Current theories about the species radiation and speciation take into account the geographic considerations of their native habitat of Thailand, and suggest that the speciation is best described by a model of either allopatric or parapatric speciation.

=== Genetics of betta biology ===
==== Aggression ====
B. splendens are known for their intense aggression, which has resulted from intense selective pressures imposed upon them from many generations of artificial selection. Fighting strains of B. splendens have been bred for aggression for over six centuries due to the culture surrounding fighting betta fish and betting money on the results. This has genetically differentiated them from their wild-type counterparts—fighting strains of B. splendens have been shown to be significantly more aggressive than wild bettas, and in addition show differential responses in cortisol production in new environments.

The extreme genetically driven aggression in fighting strains of B. splendens and their differences from the still-observable wild-type makes them an excellent candidate for a model organism through which to study the genetic basis for aggression.

At present, use of the betta fish as a model organism for studying aggression is in its beginning phases. Little is known about the genetic basis of aggression in bettas, though differential degrees of aggression have been observed in different domesticated betta populations.

===== Research to date =====
There is evidence that the genetic basis for aggression in betta fish is not exclusively sex-linked—a 2019 study found that female bettas of the fighting strain show significantly higher levels of aggression than their female wild-type counterparts, despite the fact that historically only male bettas have been used in fights and thus artificially selected for aggression. However these results are of limited usefulness, given the lack of scientific consensus on the nature of sex determination in bettas.

A recent study found that a fighting pair of bettas synchronise their gene expression profiles, with particular emphasis on 37 co-expression gene modules, some of which were synchronized only after a certain duration of time had been spent fighting.

Work to identify the genetic basis for aggression has also been performed more generally in other model species, such as zebrafish. These studies have identified dozens of candidate genes in their respective model organisms which could serve as starting points for research into aggression in betta fish. However, more progress must be made on the annotation of the betta genome before this is feasible.

==== Pigmentation ====
Due to the incredible variation in pigmentation of adult bettas and visible pigment in developing embryos, bettas are an attractive model organism for studying the genetic basis for coloration. Additionally, producing a specific color on demand would be of great interest to the commercial betta fish industry, as the price of a fish is largely determined by its coloration. Prices for attractively colored fish can be high—a single fish with the colors of the Thai flag was sold for over $1,500.

The genetic basis for the synthesis and regulation of pigmentation in teleost fish is generally poorly understood, and bettas are no exception. Most work in this area has been done on other model organisms such as zebrafish or African cichlid fish.

===== Work to date =====
In 1990, genetic differences (polymorphisms at several loci) were found between four different color varieties of bettas, though the variations were noted to be small. Later experiments confirmed the presence of genetic variation in hatchery stocks in Thailand, with low average numbers of alleles per locus and high heterozygosity rates.

Notable color phenotypes in B. splendens include the marbled phenotype and the color changing phenotype, the latter of which changes color over the course of its lifetime. While theories for the genetic basis of these phenotypes exist, scientific evidence for the genetic basis of these phenomena are slim to nonexistent.

==== Other genetic work ====
Some of the few candidate genes identified in the literature specific to bettas are immune related genes, which were found in the first whole-body transcriptome of B. splendens obtained by high-throughput sequencing.

== In popular culture ==
- In 2019, the pla kat, or Siamese fighting fish, was officially recognized as Thailand's national aquatic animal. The Fisheries Department of Thailand had promoted this recognition the previous year, which was approved by both the National Identity Committee and the National Cultural Committee, then officially announced as adopted in February 2019.
- The titular character in the novel Rumble Fish and subsequent film adaptation is a Siamese fighting fish. In both, the character Motorcycle Boy is fascinated with the creatures and dubs them "rumble fish". He speculates that if the fish were to be set free in the river, they would not behave so aggressively. A common misconception regarding keeping B. splendens is that they should live in vases or bowls. However, this has been proven to damage their health, life expectancy, and cause negative behavioural changes.
- A scene in the James Bond film From Russia with Love shows three Siamese fighting fish in an aquarium as the villain Ernst Stavro Blofeld likens the modus operandi of his criminal organisation, SPECTRE, to one of the fish that observes as the other two fight to the death, then kills the weakened victor.
- In 2020, a Siamese fighting fish named Lala kept in a home aquarium in Japan was livestreamed successfully 'completing' a copy of Pokémon Sapphire by use of a laser that followed the fish and triggered button inputs mapped on a grid behind the tank. Lala's playthrough of the game was carried out over four months, commencing in June 2020 and concluding in November, and the experiment also resulted in the discovery of a glitch that softlocked the game that had previously gone undiscovered.

== See also ==
- National symbols of Thailand
