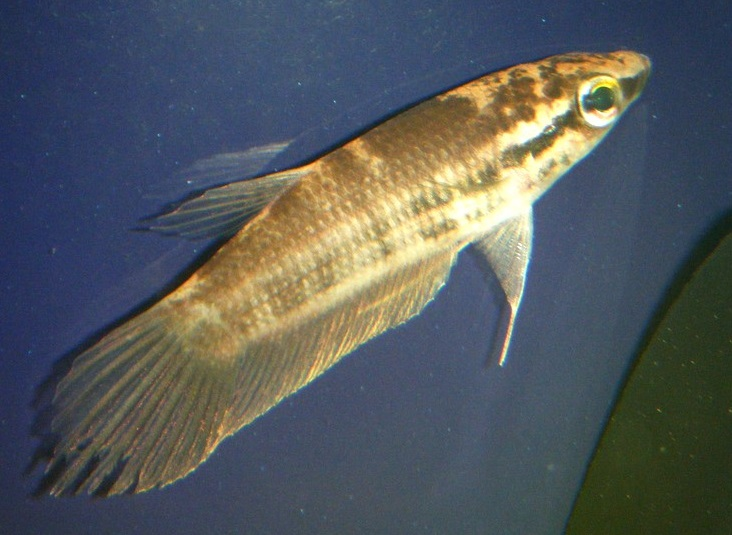

Conservation status
- Least Concern (IUCN 3.1)

Scientific classification
- Kingdom: Animalia
- Phylum: Chordata
- Class: Actinopterygii
- Division: Teleostei
- Order: Anabantiformes
- Family: Osphronemidae
- Genus: Betta
- Species: B. pugnax

Binomial name
- Betta pugnax (Cantor, 1849)

Synonyms
- Macropodus pugnax Cantor, 1849; Betta macrophthalma Regan, 1910; Betta brederi G. S. Myers, 1935

= Penang betta =

Species of fish

The Penang betta (Betta pugnax)—also known as Sepilai, the Malayan forest betta, or Malayan betta—is a species of gourami native to Southeast Asia and common in swiftly flowing forest streams of the Malay Peninsula, Thailand, Sumatra, and the Riau Islands. It can be found amongst the vegetation growing along the banks. This species can reach a length of 6.7 centimetres (2.6 in) SL. It is one of the mouthbrooding Betta species. This species, as a natural predator of mosquito larvae, has found use in mosquito control efforts. Prior to its being eclipsed in Western public recognition by the mass-imported B. splendens (the Siamese fighting fish), B. pugnax was well known as a fighting fish, as denoted by the specific epithet of pugnax.

== Etymology and naming ==
The fish was a common pet of Malay inhabitants, who referred to it as "Pla kat," which translated into "fighting fish."

The first recorded scientific classification of B. pugnax came from Theodore Cantor, who named it Macropodus pugnax. "Macropodus" came from the Ancient Greek word "μακρός" (makrós), meaning "long," and "ποδός" (podós), meaning "foot." Combined with "pugnax"—the Latin word for combative—the original scientific name meant "fond of fighting utilizing long feet"—a reference to the long fins of B. pugnax. However, Cantor's original description of B. pugnax mistakenly included other species of betta, such as B. splendens.

Around the same time, Pieter Bleeker published a paper identifying a new genus named Betta. This paper described a group of fish, including B. pugnax, but failed to categorize them into separate species. Sources differ on where Bleeker found inspiration for the word, with some claiming betta is derived from the name "Ikan Wadder Bettah," given to B. picta in the Ambarawa Javanese dialect, and others claiming betta came from the Malay word for "enduring fish."

In 1861, Albert Günther appears to have reconciled both genus identities, labeling the genus as Betta, and a species as Betta Pugnax. However, he misidentified multiple species of Betta as subspecies—including B. pugnax, still referred to as M. pugnax—and placed them all in the species category of B. pugnax. This was one of the earliest recorded confirmations that B. pugnax and M. pugnax were speaking of the same general group of fish.

Into the 20th century, sources on fish taxonomy would use B. pugnax as a species name while labeling M. pugnax as a synonym, and continued to group multiple species with the Penang betta. The exact history leading up to the diversification of betta species is unknown, but over the next century, the other betta species were correctly identified as separate species and gained their own classifications, leaving the Penang betta as the sole owner of its scientific name.

== Description ==
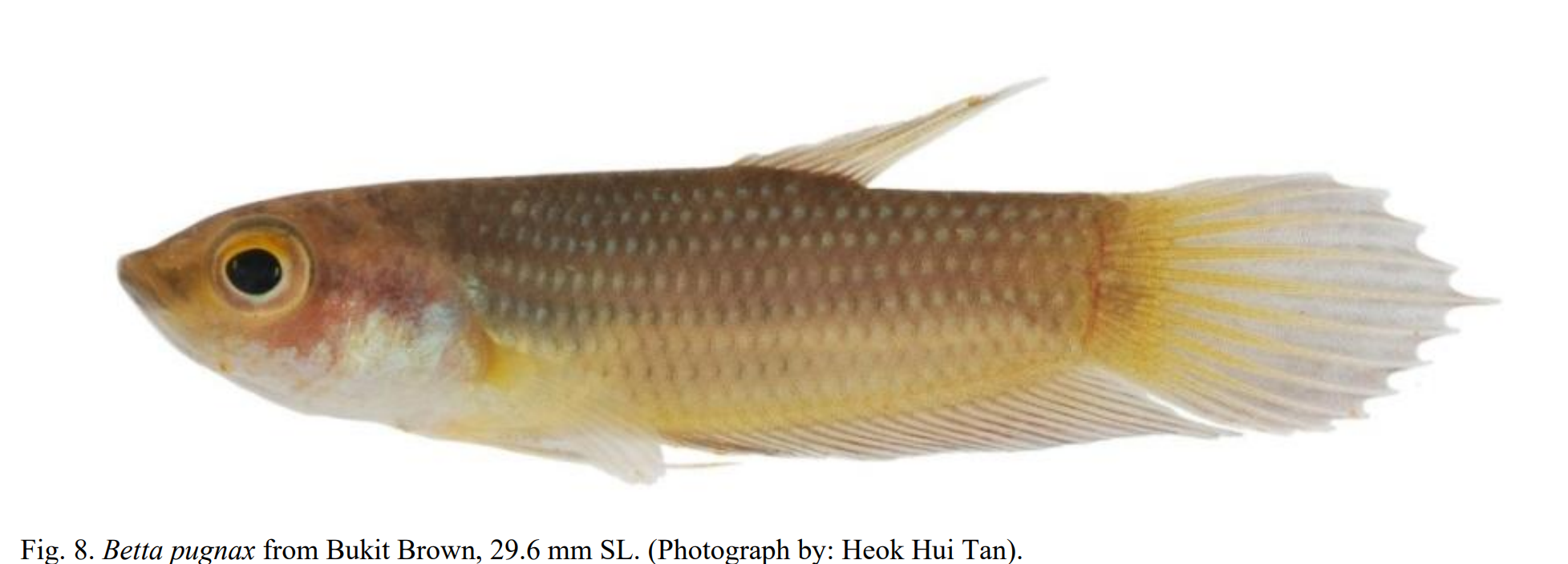
Singaporean Penang Betta

The Penang betta is described as having a superior mouth —a common trait among the betta genus—and a larger than average head. Other differences from members of the betta family include a stouter body, present chin-bar, visible dorsal transverse bars, red subdistal bands and black edges around their anal-fins, and no dark edge on caudal fins. Their heads are rhombic when viewed from above, and their irises lack iridescent patches. Their pectoral fins are rounded, while their dorsal, pelvic, and caudal fins are lanceolate.

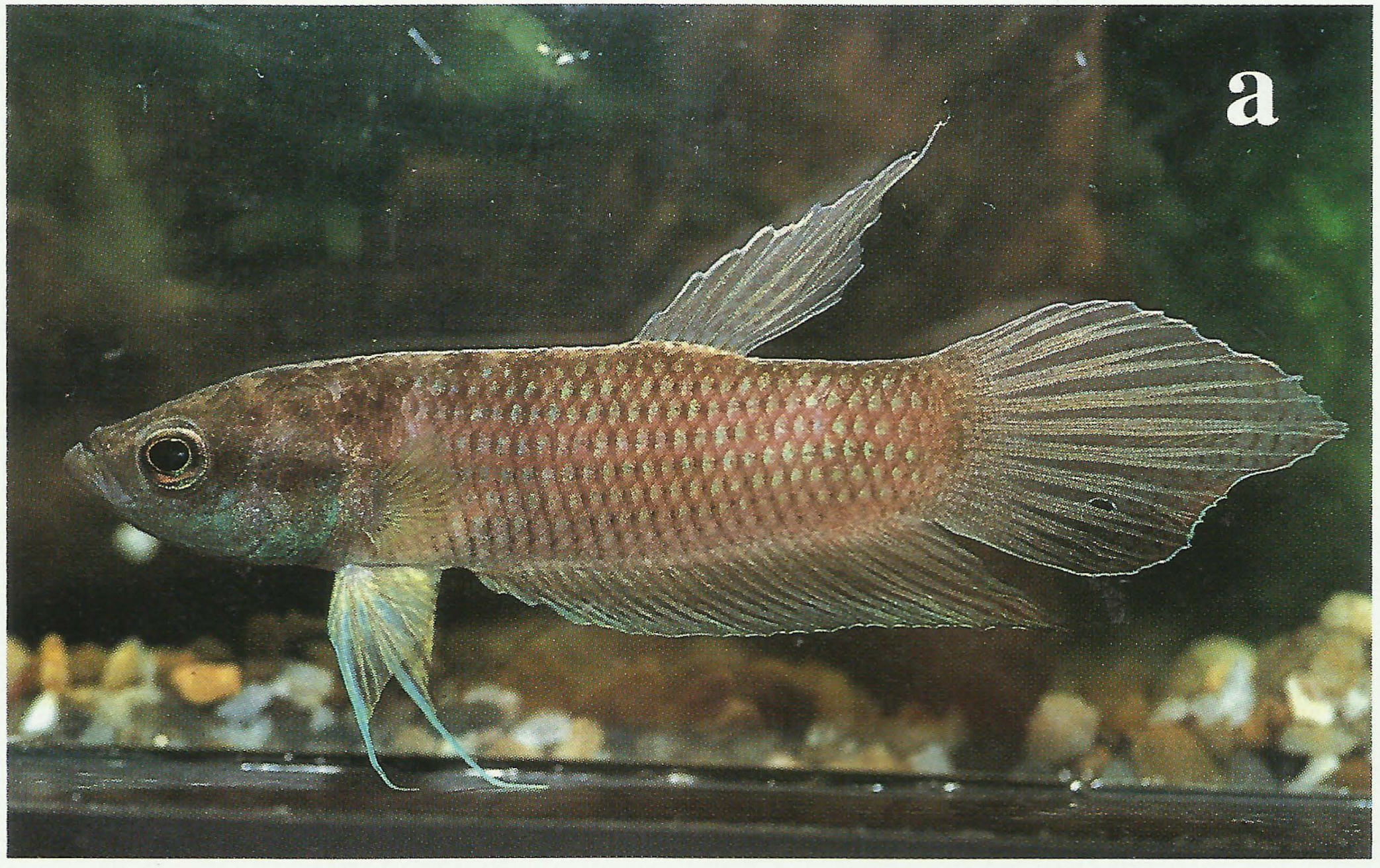
Malayan Penang Betta

Compared to the nest building bettas, the Penang betta has a more dull color scheme. They tend to be brown with green or blue iridescent spots on their scales. However, it has been noted that their coloration can shift when they spot a rival or their own reflection in a mirror. Males also have iridescent scales that cover the operculum and occasionally spread down to the stomach, whereas females and juveniles have two dark bands that run diagonally across the body, outlined in light brown. The two dark bands meet at the base of the caudal peduncle, forming a spot. B. Pugnax juveniles are also more slender than their adult counterparts, with proportionally larger eyes.

== Distribution and habitat ==
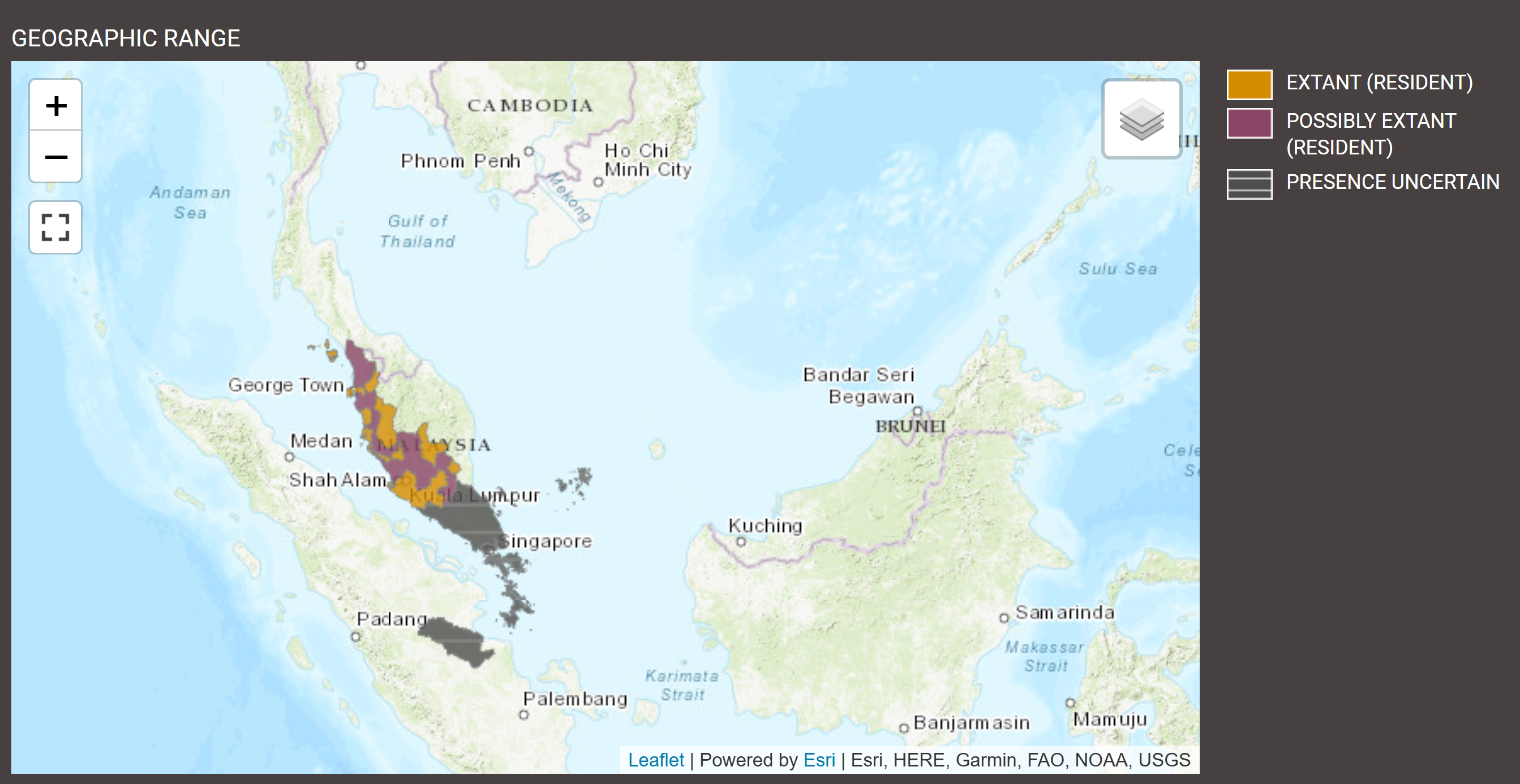
Geographic Range of Penang Betta

B. pugnax is native to the Malaysian island of Penang, where they were popular pets. Their range has also spread beyond national borders to southern Thailand, Singapore, and Indonesia and its archipelagos.

Within Malaysia, B. pugnax appears to have diversified its range, being the most common Osphronemidae species when researchers surveyed Malaysia's lotic habitats, with populations in Johor, Kedah, Pahang, Perak, Selangor, and Terengganu.

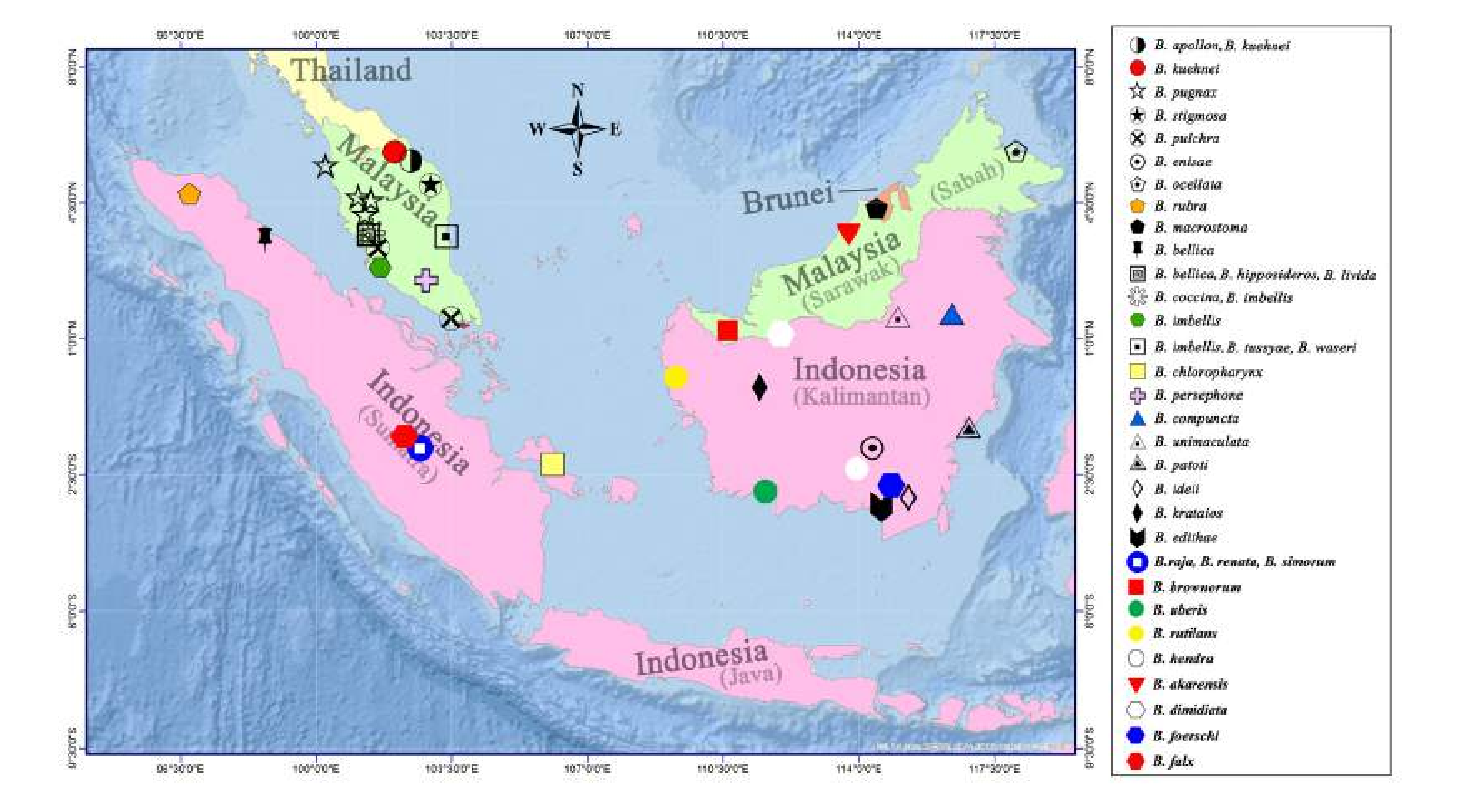
Distribution of Penang Betta, Malaysia & Indonesia

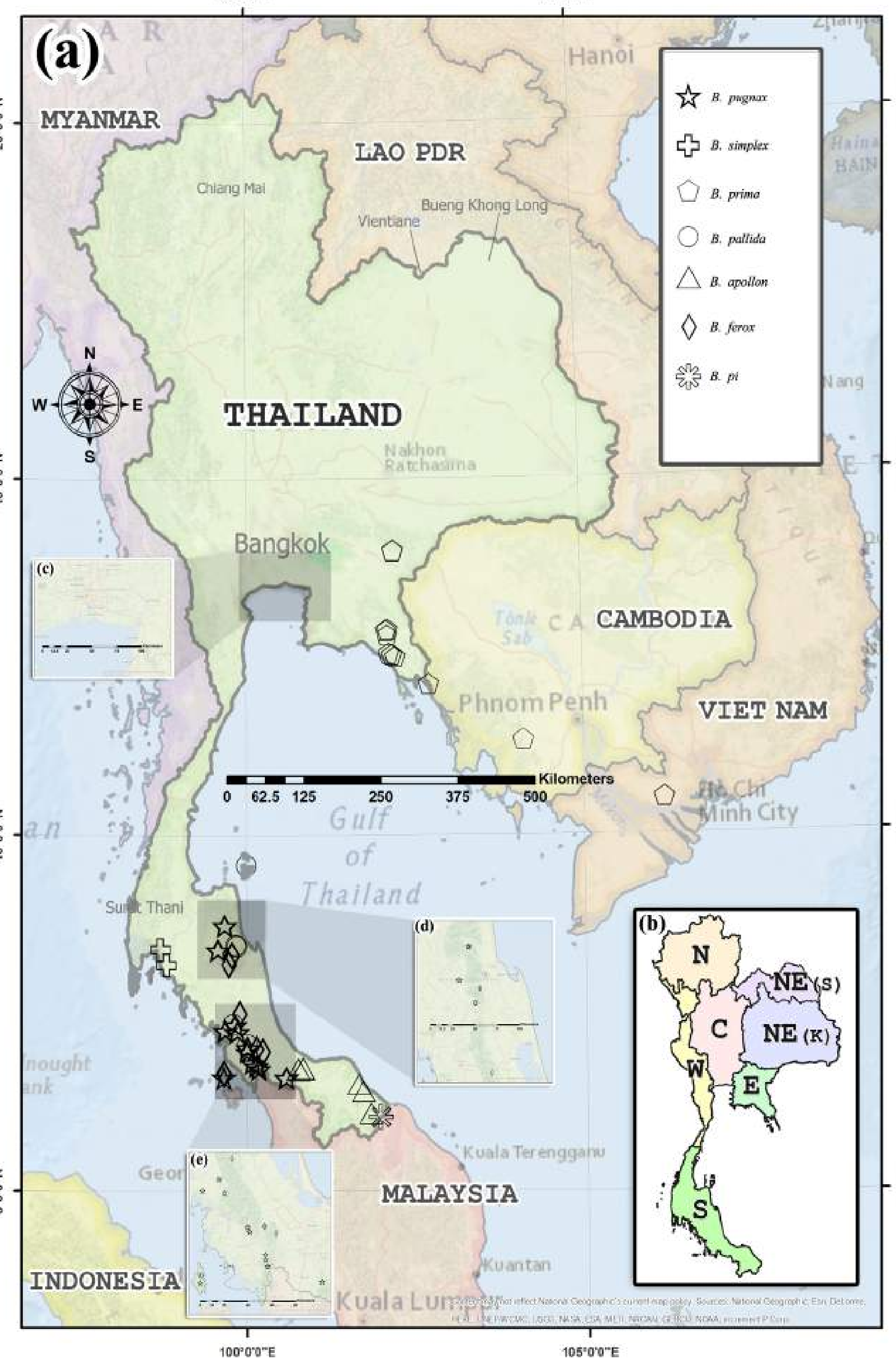
Penang Betta Distribution, Thailand

Furthermore, the Penang betta has a wide distribution within Singapore's Bukit Timah Nature Reserve (BTNR), with a preference for swamps along the eastern boundary. Researchers discovered them at all six streams/ponds surveyed—giving them the name of the most abundant native fish species—with an average of more than 10 individuals per sampling session. It was the most common anabantoid in forest areas and is the only fish present in small streams in the interior of the Bukit Timah Nature Reserve. Within Singapore's Central Catchment Nature Reserve, they are common in small streams and swamps. The only exception to this pattern appears to be in Bukit Brown, where it is suspected they were introduced.

The Penang Betta's habitat is usually streams on hills and forests, in areas with clear water. The strength of the water current can vary, from sluggish to rapid, but the habitats generally have sandy bottoms with rocks, and no submerged vegetation. B. pugnax tends to group near overhanging bank vegetation, submerged leaf litter, and exposed roots of bank vegetation. They were the only species of freshwater fish recorded from two streams in BTNR that contained slightly acidic water conditions (pH 4.28–4.78), a muddy streambed, and low dissolved oxygen levels, all conditions generally unpleasant for native fish.

== Diet ==
Wild Penang betas are mainly insectivores, feeding on insects and their larvae. However, they have also been recorded eating invertebrates.

Researchers have conducted experiments on B. pugnax's ability to hunt and consume mosquito larvae. When tested against Betta anabatoides, B. pugnax was found to have moved at a faster rate towards the mosquito larvae and consumed a larger amount of larvae than B. anabatoides. Their fierce appetite for mosquito larvae has prompted possibilities about their utilization as mosquito control.

== Reproduction and early development ==
Penang betta breed at different sizes, depending on their location. Individuals from Penang breed when over 40 mm SL, while Johor and Singapore populations can begin breeding prior to reaching 40 mm SL. There is a suspected correlation between size and maturity, but it has not been fully studied.

Within the betta family, there are two forms of offspring care: bubble nesting and mouthbrooding. The Penang betta is a mouthbrooder. Females will either lay eggs in a depression on the substrate or spawn them directly into the male's cupped anal fin. If it is the latter, the female will then take the eggs into her mouth and spit them to the male. The males will incubate them inside their mouths for anywhere from two days up to four weeks. Once the four weeks are up, the hatchlings become fry and are able to leave their father's mouth. There appears to be a correlation between the amount of yolk inside the embryo and the length of care after the fry leave their parent's mouth. If there is less yolk inside, the fry hatch sooner, and their parents will allow them to return into their mouths during danger or night, for several days or weeks after initially leaving. Mouthbrooding is an evolutionary tactic that likely stemmed from the habit of orally placing eggs in a bubble nest. It is hypothesized the mouth brooding was either a result of living in areas too turbulent to build bubble nests, or due to a failure to place eggs in the bubble nest, with the male choosing to retain them.

Contrary to popular belief, the Penang betta is not inherently territorial during breeding season. There has been evidence of interspecies cohabitation in southern Thailand, with B. pugnax coexisting with B. imbellis and B. ferox.

== Human interactions ==
There is evidence B. pugnax was imported into Germany as early back as 1905, though they never reached the level of popularity B. splendens—better known as the Siamese Fighting Fish—achieved.

Betta fighting—a native sport of Thailand—created a unique environment in which selective breeding could be observed. While it was practiced most with B. splendens, various other species—including the Penang betta—would be paired up and fight until one was victorious. The winner would be saved and bred, while the loser was discarded. This practice occurred over centuries, leading to a genetic difference between domesticated and wild betta. Domestic betta bred for fighting showed higher levels of aggression, higher swimming activity, more frequent fast strikes, and distanced displaying. The wild species was less intense, only showing aggression when in closer proximity to a threat. This behavior was consistent in both male and female bettas, suggesting the mechanism that impacts betta attitudes apply to both males and females.
