= Pierre Carbonnier =

French scientist, ichthyologist, fish breeder and public Aquarium director

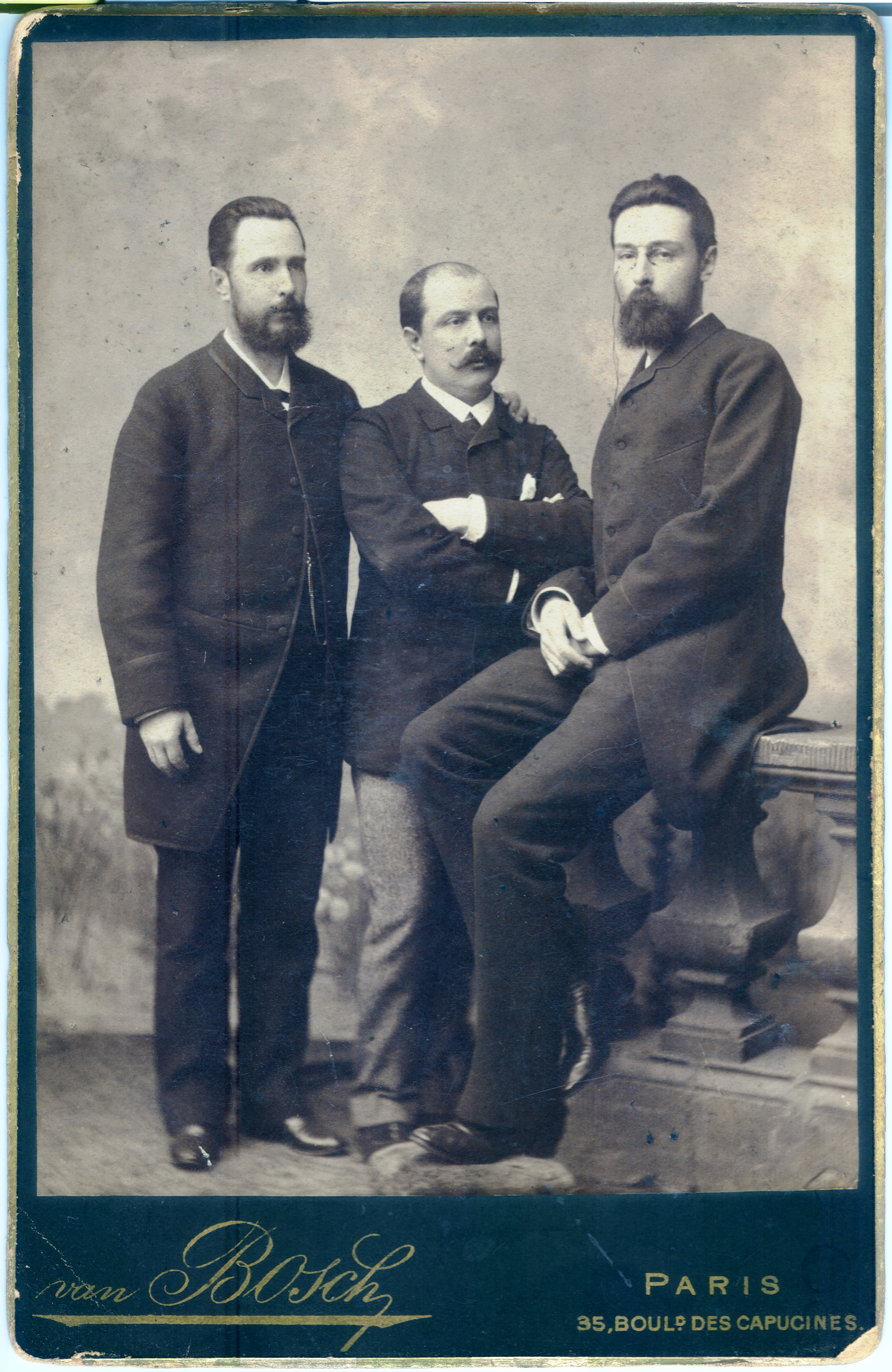
- Pierre Carbonier (center) with ichthyologists Nikolai Zolotnitsky and Andrey Meshcherskiy
- Born: 7 August 1828; Bergerac, France
- Died: 8 April 1883 (aged 54); Paris, France
- Citizenship: French
- Known for: First importer and breeder of Paradise fish and Siamese fighting fish outside Asia.
- Scientific career
- Fields: ichthyologist and fish breeder
- Institutions: director for public Aquarium

Pierre Carbonnier (7 August 1828 – 8 April 1883) was a French scientist, ichthyologist, fish breeder and public aquarium director. He was a member of the Imperial Society of Acclimatization (Société Impériale d'Acclimatation).

== Biography ==
Pierre Carbonnier was born 7 August 1828 in Bergerac, son to Pierre and Marie Andrieu. He was the third child of twelve. He married Zélie Joséphine Flusin (died 9 April 1883) in Paris on November 10, 1857.

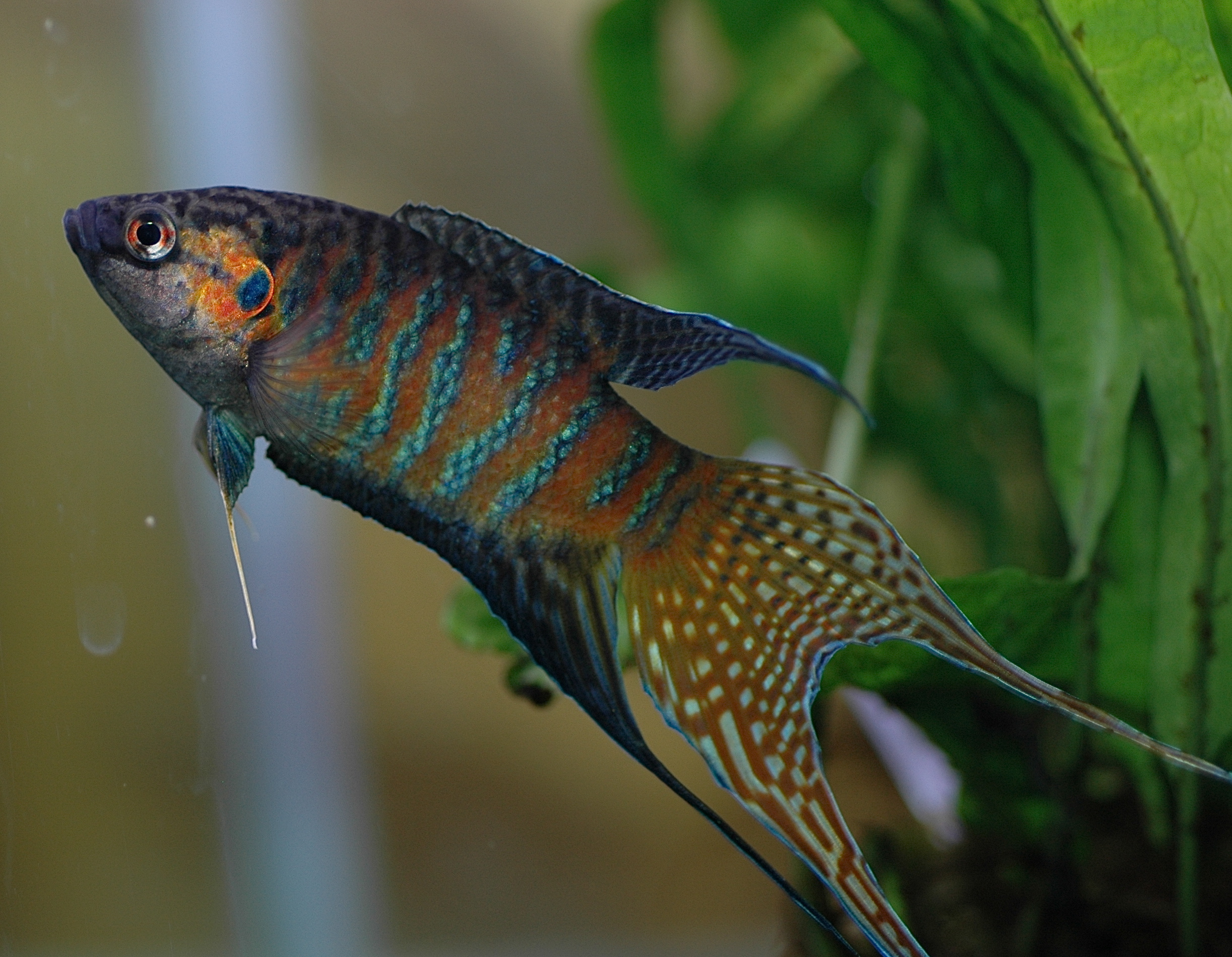
Paradise fish male

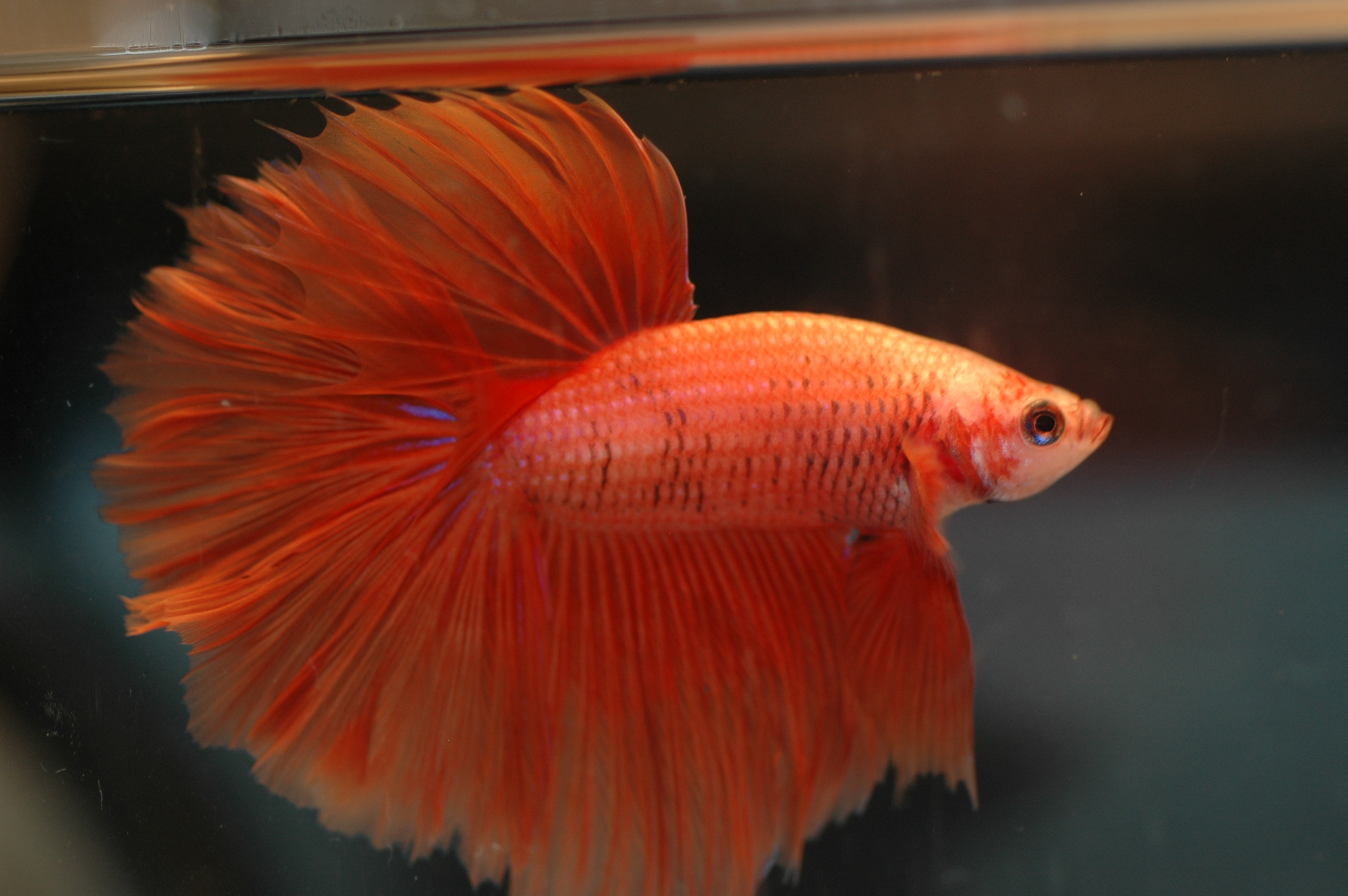
Siamese fighting fish

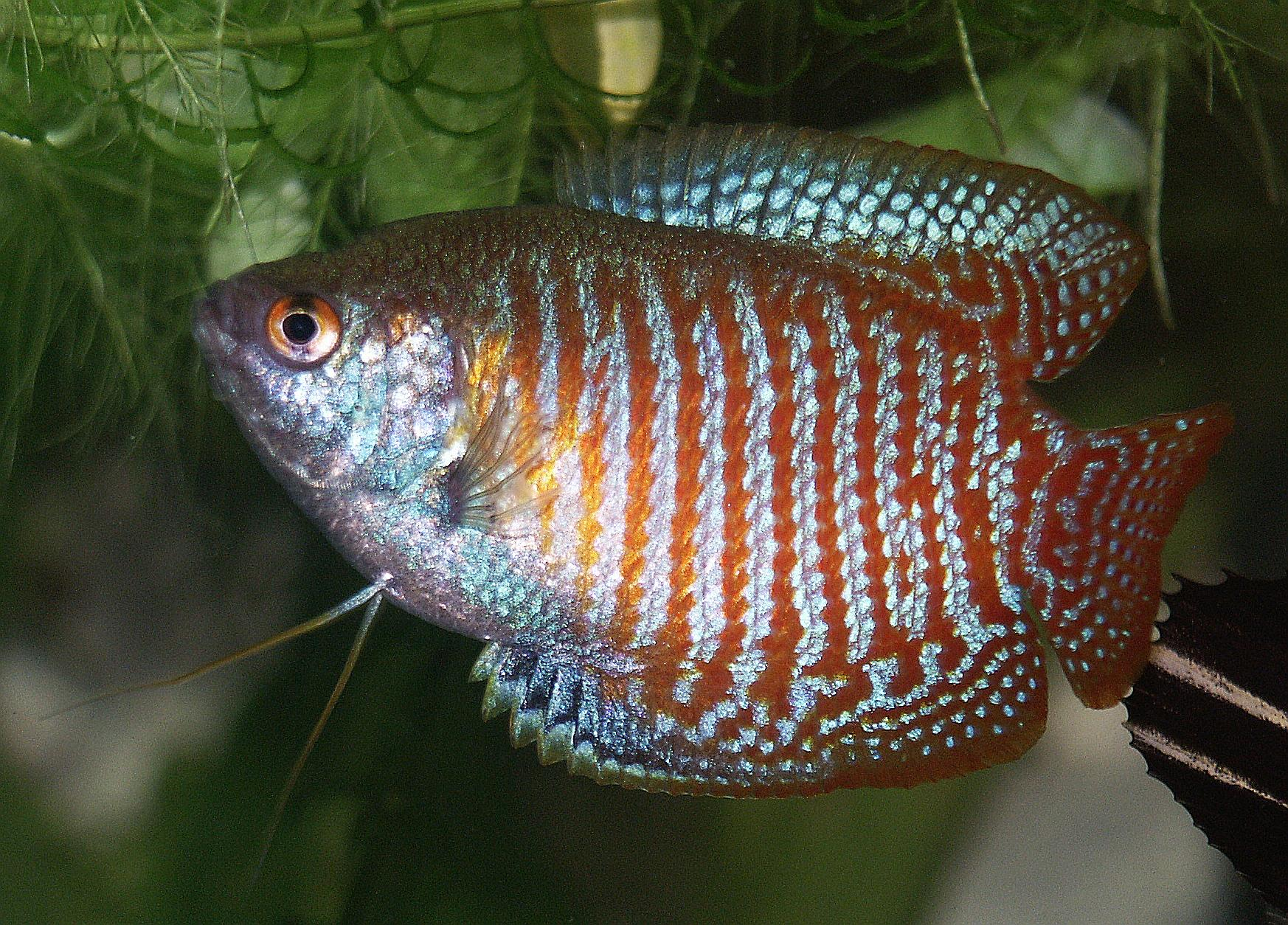
Dwarf gourami

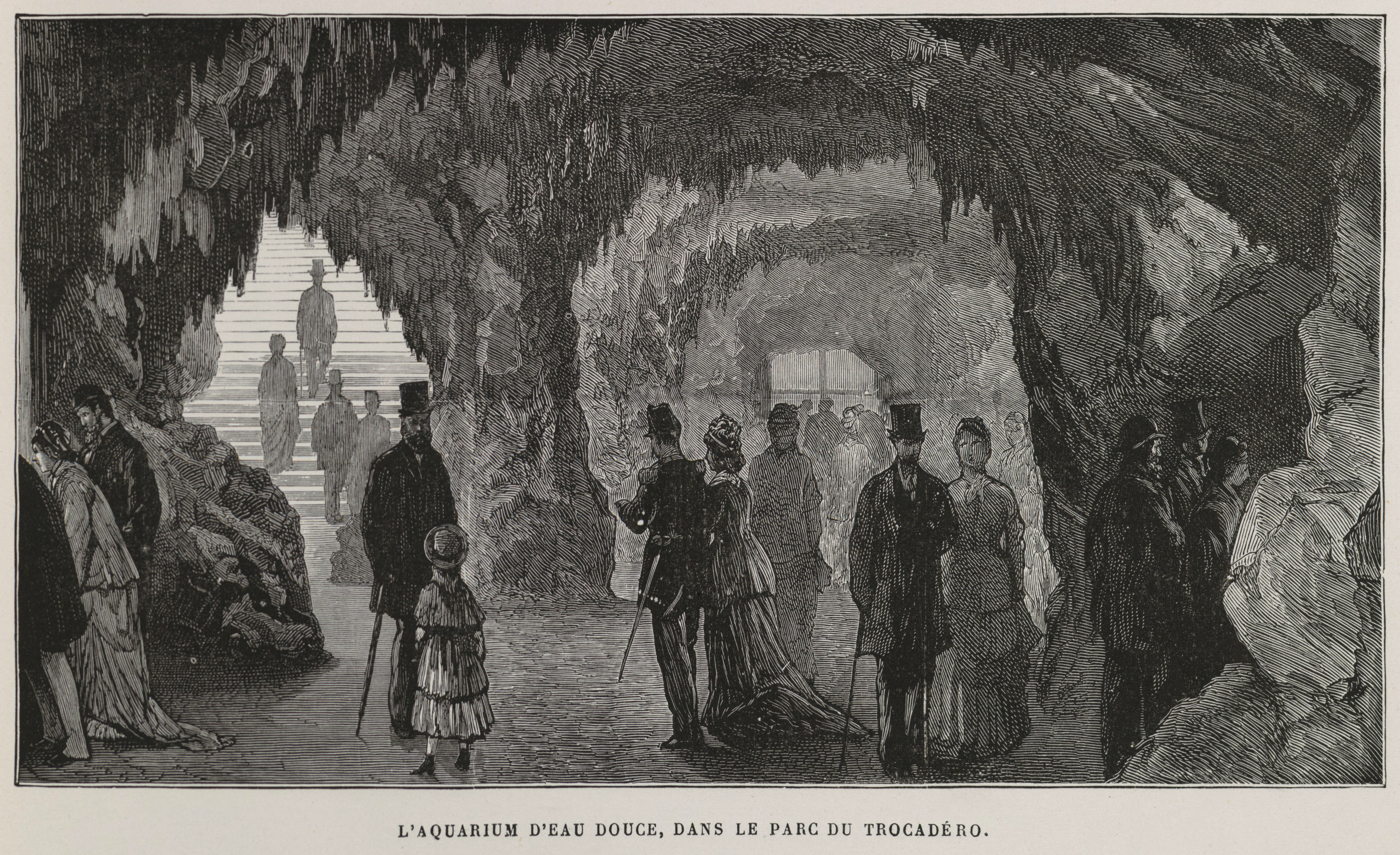
Aquarium in Jardins du Trocadéro, 1879

Carbonnier founded a public aquaria in Paris in 1850, one of the oldest in the city.

In 1869 he started to breed exotic aquarium fishes, being the first in Europe to breed the macropod (paradise fish). The first shipment of tropical fish species was brought to Europe by a naval officer named Gérault at the request of Eugène Simon, French Consul in Ningbo of Zhejiang Province in the southeast of China. Of 100 macropods, 22 arrived alive July 8, 1869 in Paris. Of these, Carbonnier received 17 specimens, (12 males and 5 females). Two years later he had raised 200 specimens of the paradise fish.

The same year he wrote the brochure "Report and observations about the pairing of one kind of Chinese fish" (French: Rapport et Observations sur l'accouplement d'une espèce de poisson de Chine; 1869), and a year later "The new remark on the Chinese fish belonging to the genus makropody" (French: Nouvelle Note sur un poisson de Chine appartenant au genre macropode; 1870), among others. He published also several works devoted to the breeding of crustaceans.

His fish breeding center was destroyed in 1870-1871 during the siege of Paris by the Prussian troops in the Franco-Prussian War, but he regained his spirit and in 1872 he introduced the Fantail, a variety of gold fish (Carassius auratus). In 1874 Carbonnier imported the first Siamese fighting fish (Betta splendens) and dwarf gourami (Colisa lalia).

At the International Exhibition of sea and river industries in Paris in 1875, Carbonnier was awarded the Gold Medal of the French Imperial Society of Acclimatization for research and breeding of freshwater aquarium of exotic fish and his success of introducing exotic fish species to France.

In 1878 Carbonnier was the first to breed the peppered corydoras catfish (Corydoras paleatus), native to the basin of the Paraná River in Brazil. In the same year, Pierre Carbonnier was appointed director of the Trocadéro Aquarium at the French Exhibition of 1878 in Jardins du Trocadéro.

He died 1883 in Paris.

== Publications ==
- Pierre Carbonnier, Guide pratique du pisciculteur, Librairie scientifique, industrielle et agricole, Eugène Lacroix, Éditeur, Paris, 1864.
- Pierre Carbonnier, "Nidification du Poisson arc-en-ciel de l'Inde", in Bulletin de la Société d'Acclimatation, 3ème Série, Tome III, 1876, p.11-22.
- 1864 Guide pratique du pisciculteur
- 1867 Étude sur les causes de la mortalité des poissons
- 1869 L'Écrevisse, mœurs, reproduction, éducation
- 1869 Rapport et Observations sur l'accouplement d'une espèce de poisson de Chine
- 1870 Nouvelle Note sur un poisson de Chine appartenant au genre macropode
- 1872 Du Transport des poissons
- 1872 Trois mémoires pour servir à l'histoire zoologique du poisson de Chine le macropode
- 1872 Le Macropode de Chine
- 1873 Commission des cheptels. Instruction aux chepteliers. 3e section. Poissons. Instructions sur les pratiques de l'incubation artificielle. Le transport des œufs et de l'alevin,
- 1873 De l'Influence de la pression extérieure sur la vie des poissons, et de la lumière lunaire sur la végétation aquatique
- 1874 Mémoire sur la reproduction du poisson américain Le Fondule ([Fundula cyprinodonta] Cuv.) Mensuel de la Soc. D'acclimatation de Paris, d Bull. 3 (1) :665-671
- 1875 Découverte d'une station préhistorique dans le département de la Seine à Champigny (bulletin de la société académique de Brest)
- 1876 Nidification du poisson arc-en-ciel de l'Inde
- 1877 Le Gourami et son nid
- 1879 Rapport et observations sur l'aquarium d'eau douce du Trocadéro
- 1880 Sur le [Callichthys fasciatus] Cuvier. Bull. de la Soc. Zool. De France 5:288-290.
