= Dwarf snakehead =

Asian freshwater fish species

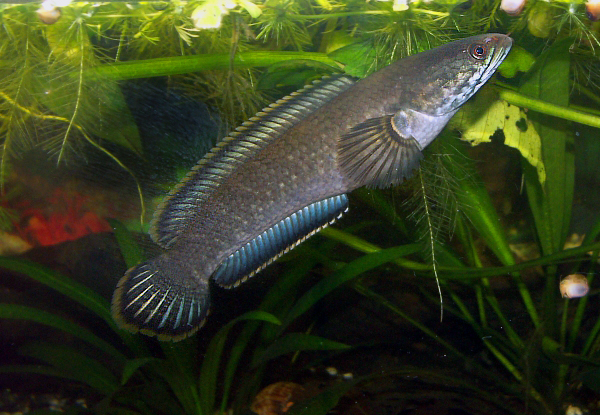
Channa gachua, one of the dwarf snakeheads

Dwarf snakehead is a term coined by aquarists to describe a group of Channa snakehead fishes growing to about 25 cm (10 in) maximum. They are found in freshwater habitats (often streams) in South and Southeast Asia, and southern China.

The following snakeheads belong to this group:

- Channa andrao
- Channa aurantipectoralis
- Channa baramensis
- Channa bipuli
- Channa bleheri
- Channa brunnea
- Channa burmanica
- Channa coccinea = Channa sp. Ignis
- Channa gachua
- Channa harcourtbutleri
- Channa kelaartii
- Channa limbata
- Channa lipor
- Channa melanostigma
- Channa orientalis
- Channa ornatipinnis
- Channa panaw
- Channa pardalis
- Channa pulchra
- Channa pyrophthalmus = Channa sp. fire and ice.
- Channa quinquefasciata
- Channa rara
- Channa royi
- Channa rubora = Channa sp. Burmese red rim rainbow or Channa sp. redfin.
- Channa shingon
- Channa stewartii
- Channa stiktos

Some of these are borderline dwarf snakeheads, slightly surpassing 25 cm (10 in) in maximum length (e.g., C. pulchra has been called a dwarf snakehead, but may reach 30 cm or 12 in). In contrast, the smallest dwarf snakehead species are less than 15 cm (6 in).

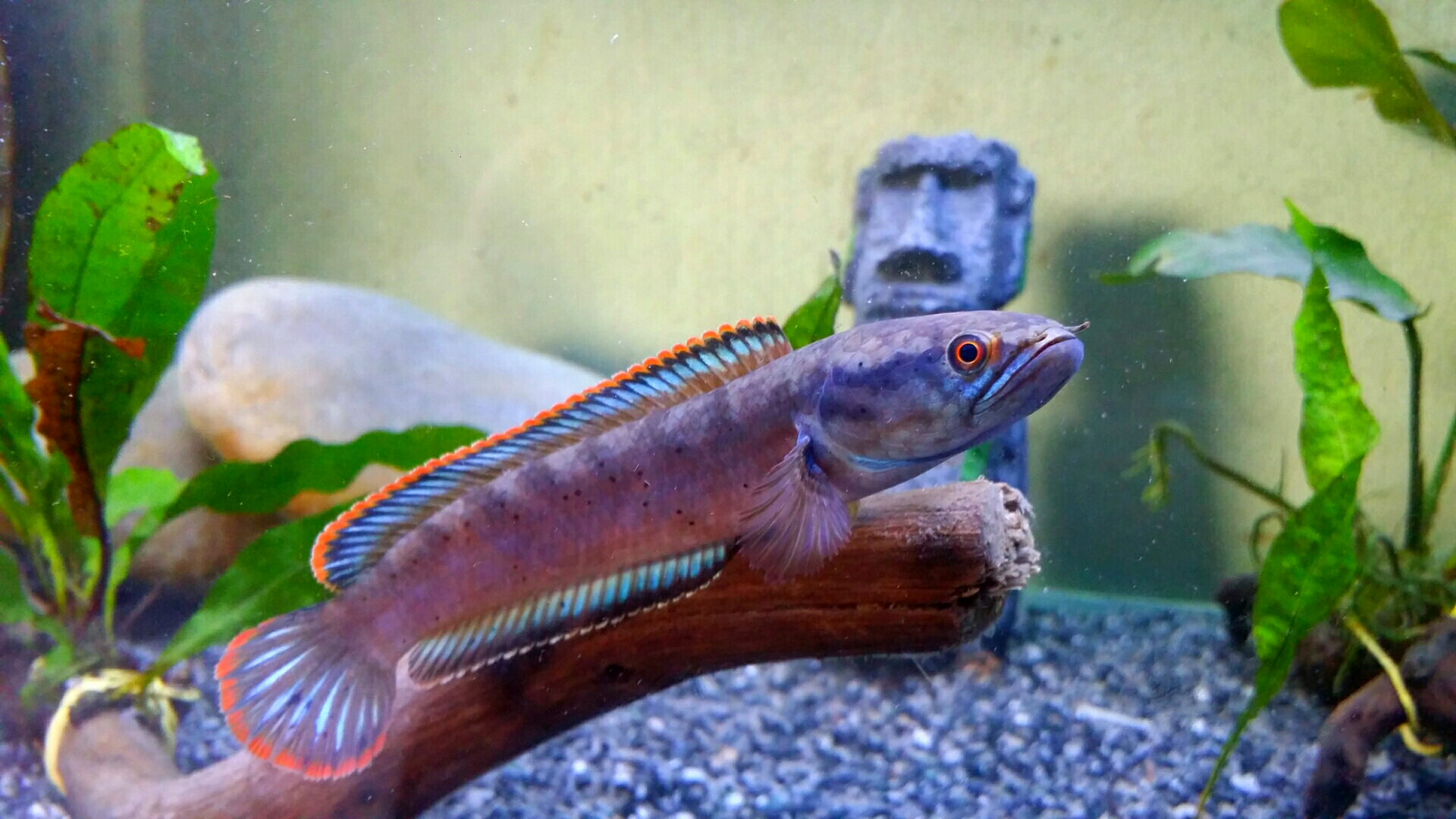
Channa sp. "redfin", a dwarf snakehead that still is scientifically undescribed

Several of these only recently received their scientific name, but were already known among aquarists before. Examples of this are C. andrao (described 2013, previously known as C. sp. "Lal Cheng" or "blue bleheri"), C. pardalis (described 2016, previously known as C. sp. "Meghalaya leopard"), C. quinquefasciata (described 2018, previously known as C. sp. "five stripe"), C. torsaensis (described 2018, previously known as C. sp. "cobalt blue"), and C. brunnea (described 2019, previously known as C. sp. "chocolate bleheri"). A few dwarf snakeheads that are known from the aquarium trade remain undescribed, including:

- Channa sp. Laos fireback.
- Channa sp. mulberry or Channa sp. morus.

Besides their commonality of being of small size, dwarf snakeheads generally are paternal mouthbrooders (confirmed in some species, suspected in others). An exception is the free-spawning C. bleheri where the eggs float to the surface and the parents take care of them (no mouthbrooding).

Although several dwarf snakeheads are very close relatives, overall the group is not monophyletic. For example, the dwarfs C. burmanica and C. stewartii are phylogenetically much closer to the large C. barca (up to 105 cm or 3.4 ft) than they are to the dwarfs C. ornatipinnis, C. pulchra and C. stiktos.
