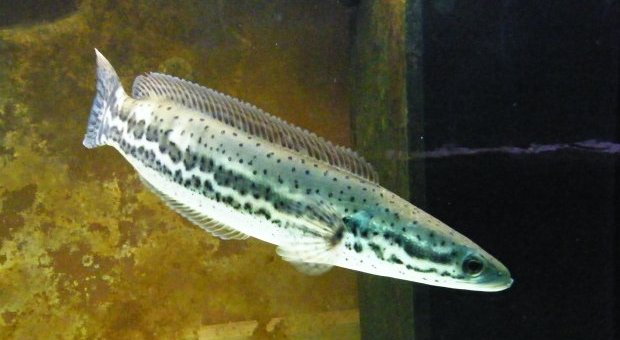
- Malabar snakehead, Channa diplogramma

Conservation status
- Vulnerable (IUCN 3.1)

Scientific classification
- Kingdom: Animalia
- Phylum: Chordata
- Class: Actinopterygii
- Division: Teleostei
- Order: Anabantiformes
- Family: Channidae
- Genus: Channa
- Species: C. diplogramma

Binomial name
- Channa diplogramma (F. Day, 1865)

= Malabar snakehead =

Species of fish

The Malabar snakehead (Channa diplogramma) is a vulnerable species of snakehead from fresh water in the Western Ghats in India. Until 2011, its scientific name was usually considered to be a synonym of C. micropeltes, the giant snakehead.

== Taxonomy ==
Sir Francis Day described Ophiocephalus diplogramma in 1865 based on one juvenile specimen (42 mm in length) collected near the mouth of the Cochin River in the port city of Cochin (southwestern India) and called it Malabar snakehead. The colour pattern of this juvenile matched with that of juveniles of another species of snakehead, O. micropeltes, originally described by Cuvier and Valenciennes from Java, Indonesia. This possibly led Day to synonymise C. diplogramma with C. micropeltes in 1878. The close similarity, rarity of adult specimens in museum collections, and because no taxonomist had studied this snakehead since its description, resulted in the subsequent acceptance of the synonymy by ichthyologists. In 2011, C. diplogramma was shown to be a valid species 134 years after it was synonymised, making it an endemic species of peninsular India.

== Biology ==
C. diplogramma shows multiple colour phases during its life history, which makes local fishers believe that they are different species. The different specimens are also known by different vernacular names (pulivaka, karivaka, manalvaka, and charalvaka). All these specimen in different colour phases occur sympatrically and use the same ecological habitats.

== Distribution ==
The Malabar snakehead is endemic to the southern Western Ghats of peninsular India. It is known from the Meenachil, Manimala, Pampa, Achenkovil, Chalakudy and Kallada Rivers (and their reservoirs) in Kerala, as well as the Chittar and Tambaraparani Rivers (and their reservoirs) in Tamil Nadu.

== Identification ==
The Malabar snakehead differs from all other species in the genus by its high number of lateral line scales (103–105 vs. 36–91). It further differs from all other Channa species, except C. bankanensis, C. lucius, C. micropeltes, and C. pleurophthalma, by the presence of gular scales, a patch of scales between the anterior tips of the lower jaws, visible in ventral view. C. diplogramma differs from C. bankanensis, C. lucius, and C. pleurophtalma by having a very different color pattern, and from its sister species C. micropeltes by a combination of characteristics, viz. number of caudal fin rays, lateral line scales, scales below lateral line; total vertebrae, pre-anal length, and body depth.

== Conservation status ==
The Malabar snakehead is listed as a vulnerable species in the IUCN Red List in view of its restricted distribution, and threats including fishing, habitat loss, and pollution.
