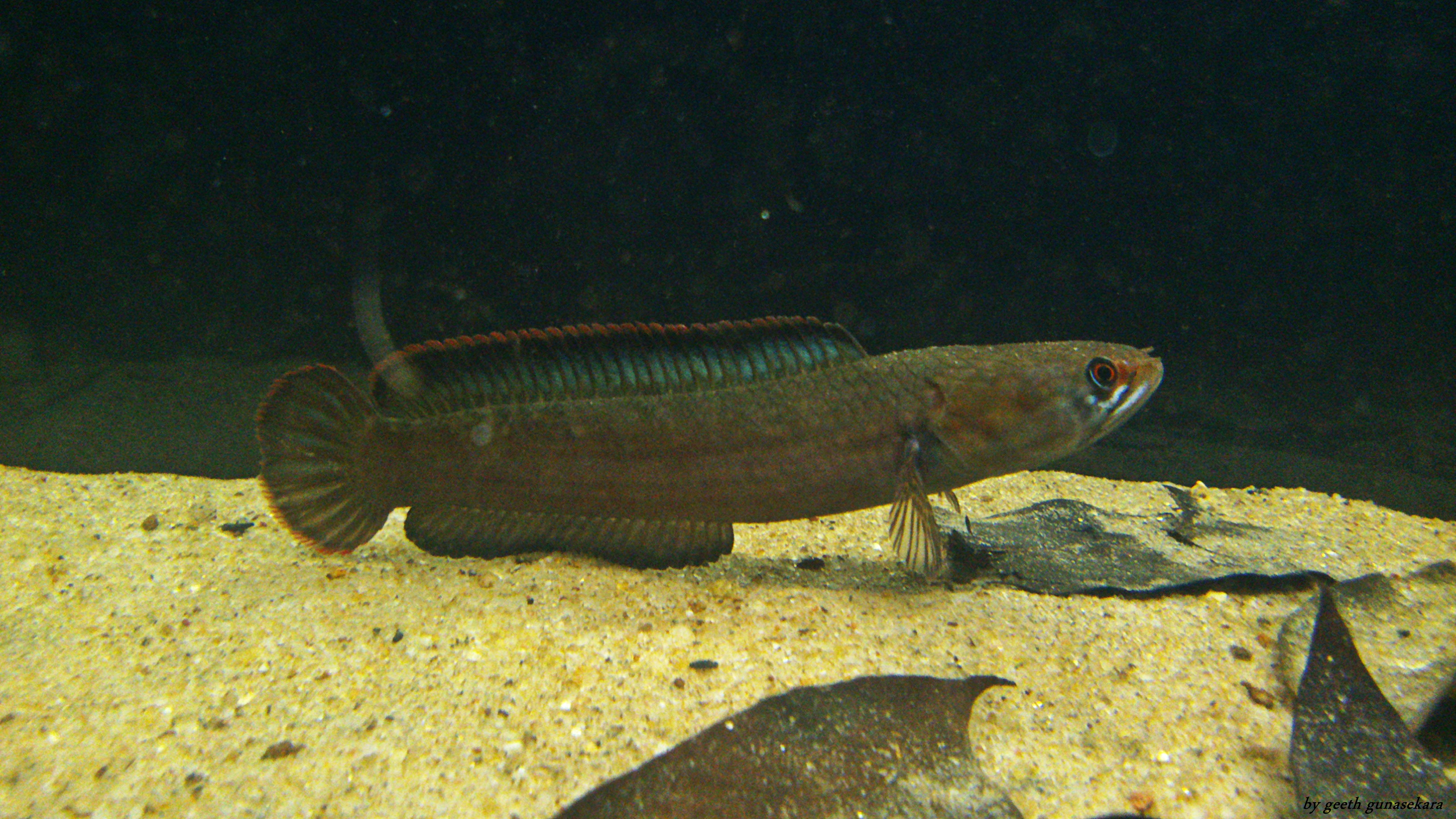

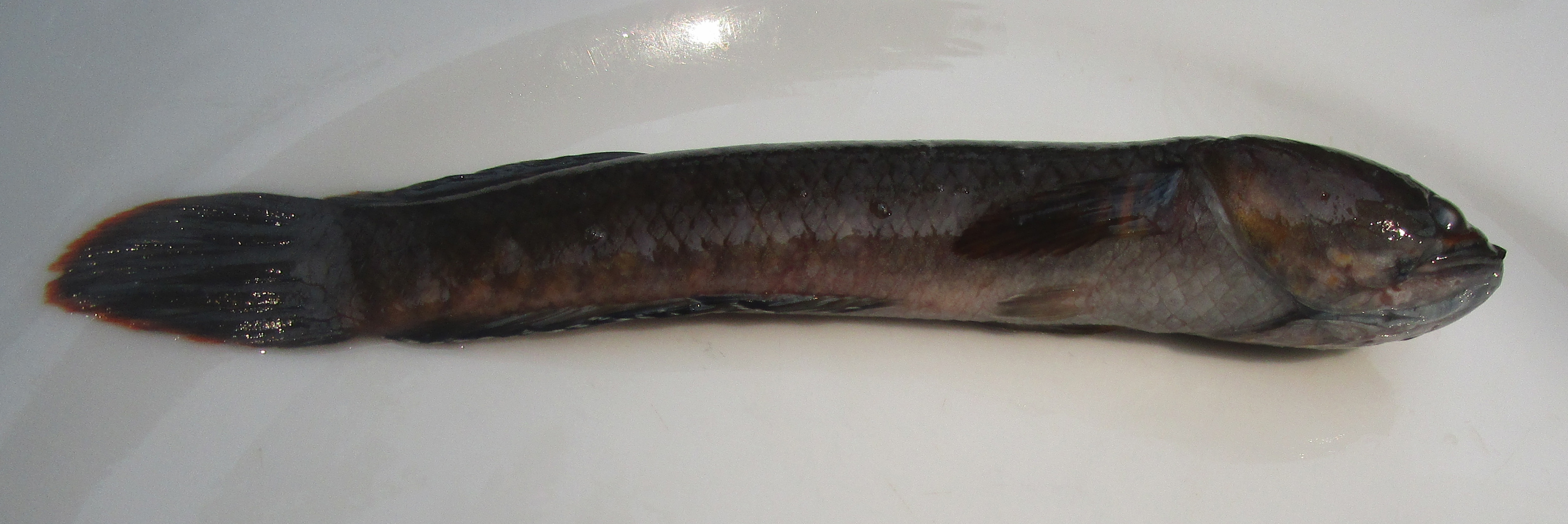

Conservation status
- Vulnerable (IUCN 3.1)

Scientific classification
- Kingdom: Animalia
- Phylum: Chordata
- Class: Actinopterygii
- Division: Teleostei
- Order: Anabantiformes
- Family: Channidae
- Genus: Channa
- Species: C. orientalis

Binomial name
- Channa orientalis Bloch & J. G. Schneider, 1801

= Ceylon snakehead =

Species of fish

The Ceylon snakehead (Channa orientalis) is a species of snakehead found in freshwater habitats, typically shaded streams, in southwestern Sri Lanka (although occasionally claimed to occur in other countries, this is misidentifications of relatives, usually C. gachua).

It is evaluated as Vulnerable by the IUCN and some do consider C. orientalis as a threatened species.

== Description ==
C. orientalis has a standard length of up to 10 cm (4 in) and is one of the smallest species in the family, making it a dwarf snakehead. It lacks pelvic fins and this distinguishes it from some of its relatives, including C. gachua, a widespread species that also occurs in Sri Lanka (although the Sri Lankan population possibly should be recognized as a species of its own, C. kelaartii). A few other dwarf snakeheads from the Asian mainland, like C. andrao, also lack pelvic fins, but (in addition to distribution) these can be separated by meristics and colour pattern.

A genetic study published in 2017 revealed that C. orientalis includes two deeply separated lineages.

== Behavior ==
They are predatory fish that feed on plankton, insects, and sometimes small amphibians. They can breathe on land for short periods of time because they have accessory respiratory organs through which they can use atmospheric oxygen to breathe. During wet weather, they can survive on land for more than four days, but if their bodies dry up, they die because it becomes difficult for them to exchange atmospheric oxygen. The Ceylon snakehead is a mouth brooder like many Channa species. The male carries the eggs while the female guards the territory. The male is less active during this period and is often seen close to the surface. The fry remain with the male until they can take care of themselves. Females may catch stray fry and return them to the mouth of the male. The fry are ejected via the gill openings.

== Culture ==
In Myanmar, this fish is known as Nga-yan-goungdos. Fishers put their hooks on bamboo poles near the waters surface with a living cricket as bait. To catch these shallow-water fish, the hooks are attached to bamboo poles in shallow water. The fish will jump out of the water to seize their prey, oftentimes dislodging the bamboo pole.
