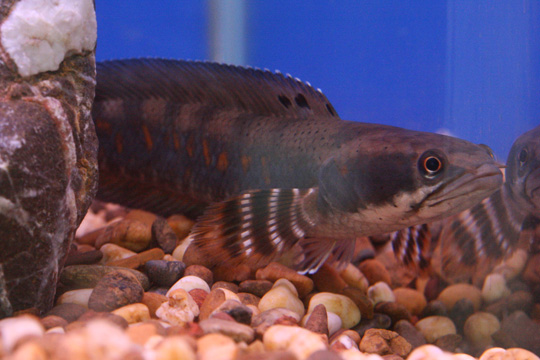

Conservation status
- Data Deficient (IUCN 3.1)

Scientific classification
- Kingdom: Animalia
- Phylum: Chordata
- Class: Actinopterygii
- Order: Anabantiformes
- Family: Channidae
- Genus: Channa
- Species: C. pulchra

Binomial name
- Channa pulchra Britz, 2007

= Channa pulchra =

Species of fish

Channa pulchra is a species of snakehead fish in the family Channidae which is native to Myanmar. It was first described in 2007 by Ralf Britz from a specimen collected from the Kyeintali Chaung (stream) basin in Rakhine Yoma, western Myanmar. The fish is found in streams that are fast flowing, clear, highly oxygenated and relatively cold (subtropical). It is of little food value but getting popularity as an aquarium fish recently.

Although it has been referred to as a dwarf snakehead, it can reach a total length of up to 30 cm (12 in). C. pulchra is closely related to C. ornatipinnis and C. stiktos.
