= Channa aristonei =

Scientific classification
- Domain: Eukaryota
- Kingdom: Animalia
- Phylum: Chordata
- Class: Actinopterygii
- Order: Anabantiformes
- Family: Channidae
- Genus: Channa
- Species: C. aristonei

Binomial name
- Channa aristonei Praveenraj, Thackeray, Singh, Uma, Moulitharan & Mukhim, 2020

Species of fish

Channa aristonei is a species of fish belonging to the Channidae family found in the northeastern Indian state of Meghalaya.

== Etymology ==
The species epithet aristonei is named after Aristone M. Ryndongsngi. Aristone is a freshwater enthusiast who accidentally collected the specimen, thinking that it is Channa pardalis.
