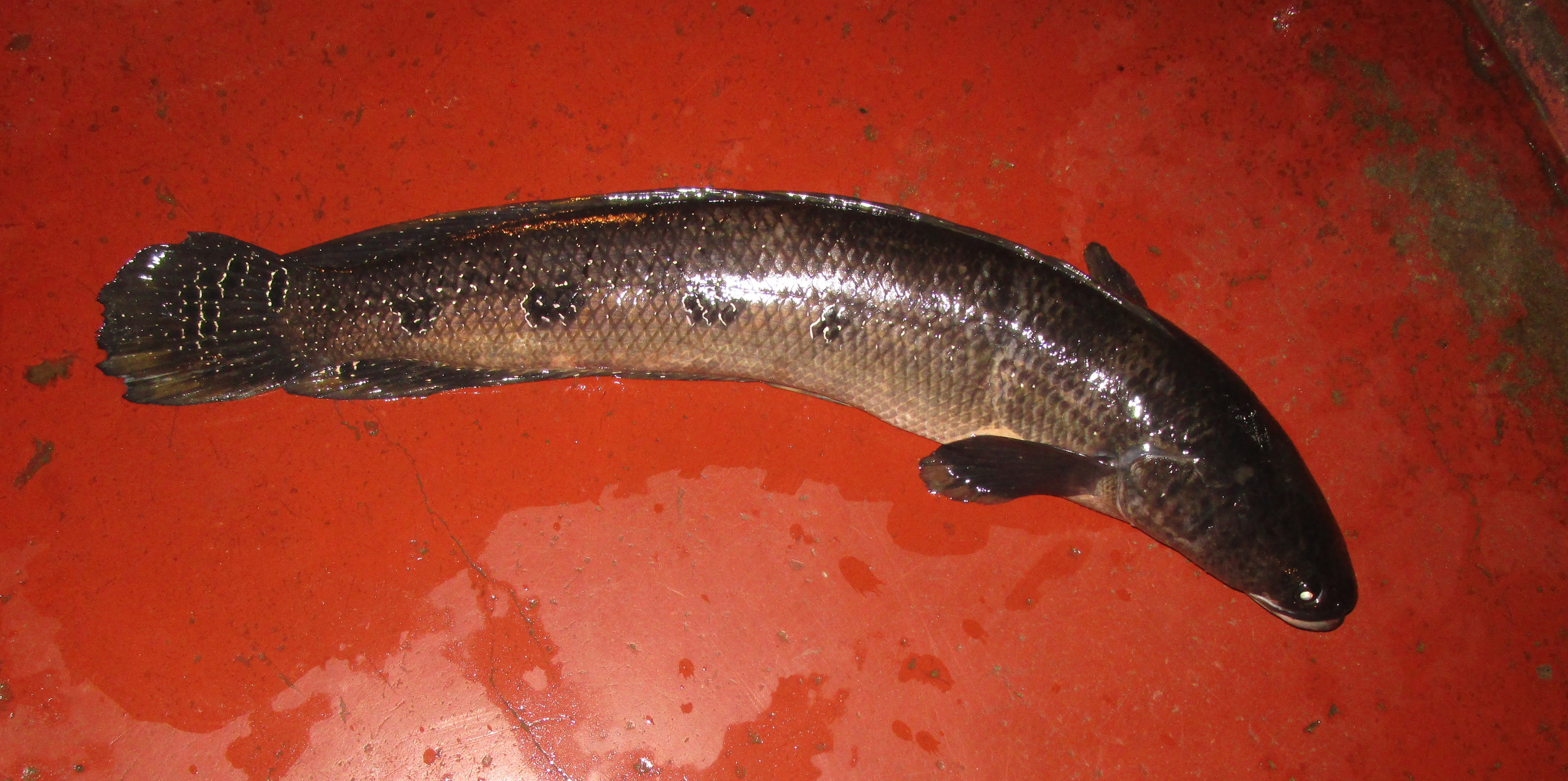

Conservation status
- Least Concern (IUCN 3.1)

Scientific classification
- Kingdom: Animalia
- Phylum: Chordata
- Class: Actinopterygii
- Order: Anabantiformes
- Family: Channidae
- Genus: Channa
- Species: C. marulius

Binomial name
- Channa marulius (F. Hamilton, 1822)

Synonyms
- Ophicephalus marulius Hamilton, 1822; Ophicephalus grandinosus Cuvier, 1831; Ophiocephalus grandinosus Cuvier, 1831; Ophicephalus sowara Cuvier, 1831; Ophicephalus leucopunctatus Sykes, 1839; Ophiocephalus theophrasti Valenciennes, 1840; Ophiocephalus aurolineatus Day, 1870

= Channa marulius =

Species of fish

Channa marulius, the bullseye snakehead or great snakehead, is a large species of snakehead native to South Asia. Populations in Southeast Asia are now regarded as separate species.

== Taxonomy ==
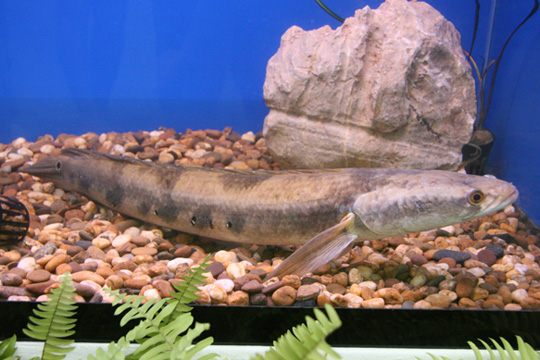
A bullseye snakehead in an artificial habitat

C. marulius—as traditionally defined—is a species complex. A study published in 2017 showed that C. pseudomarulius, formerly regarded as a synonym of C. marulius, is a valid species from the southern Western Ghats. A genetic study published the same year showed that C. marulius consisted of three clearly separated lineages (not counting the already separated C. pseudomarulius). One of these is C. aurolineata, revalidated in 2018 for the populations in drainages in Myanmar, Thailand, and non-natively in the United States (separated from the more western C. marulius by the Indo-Burman Ranges), and the other was described as a new species, C. auroflammea, from the Mekong basin in 2019. In India it is a widespread native fish. In South India, it is commonly found in reservoirs, in Pechipparai, Chittar, Manimuthar, Bhvani, and Mettur dams of Tamil Nadu, and Thenmalai, Neyyar, and Idukki dams of Kerala. It can also be found in the reservoirs of Himachal Pradesh, such as the Pong Dam (Maharana Pratap Sagar), where it is known locally as soal. C. marulius is commonly known as giant murrel. In Assam, it is locally known as xal (Assamese: শাল). In Andhra and Telangana, it is called korrameenu (కొర్రమీను), and is quite common in lakes and reservoirs. In Sindh, the larger one is referred to as Shakur (Sindhi: شاڪُرُ) and the smaller one as Mukur (Sindhi: مُڪُرُ).

C. marulius is also found in Sri Lankan waterways. It is found in the northern dry zone and it also has two other subspecies. Channa ara, which is known as Kalumaha (Sinhala: කලුමහ), has a deep black body with numerous white to gold speckles on the underside. C. ara is an endemic species to the Mahaweli River basin. It grows up to about 50–65 cm on average, though specimens with a size around 90–100 cm were recorded in the past. They are threatened mainly due to overfishing and collection for the ornamental fish trade.

The other subspecies of C. marulius, Channa cf. Ara, is found in the rivers of the southwestern wet zone. C. ara grows to an average length of 55–68 cm in the wild and has a slender body shape.

== Culinary ==
Bullseye snakehead is a fast-growing fish species when compared to most of the others of the genus, and they are also suitable for intensive culture due to their air-breathing habit. They are being sold live and fetch high prices in the market, due to their excellent-tasting flesh and lack of fine bones.
