= Channa royi =

Scientific classification
- Kingdom: Animalia
- Phylum: Chordata
- Class: Actinopterygii
- Order: Anabantiformes
- Family: Channidae
- Genus: Channa
- Species: C. royi

Binomial name
- Channa royi Praveenraj et al., 2018

Species of fish

Channa royi, the Andaman emerald snakehead, is a species of snakehead fish endemic to the Andaman and Nicobar Islands of India. This dwarf snakehead is distinct from other snakehead species due to its differing coloration, number of vertebrae, and teeth, most notably its greenish-gray dorsum. It was only scientifically described in 2018 and its closest relative is the Burmese snakehead (C. hartcourtbutleri), and a review in 2019 argued that the two are synonyms.

If recognized as its own species, it is only known from the South, Middle, and North Andaman islands, and is abundant in clear, slow-flowing water with rocks and little vegetation, such as ditches, ponds, and hill streams. The specific name honours the fisheries biologist Sibnarayan Dam Roy.
