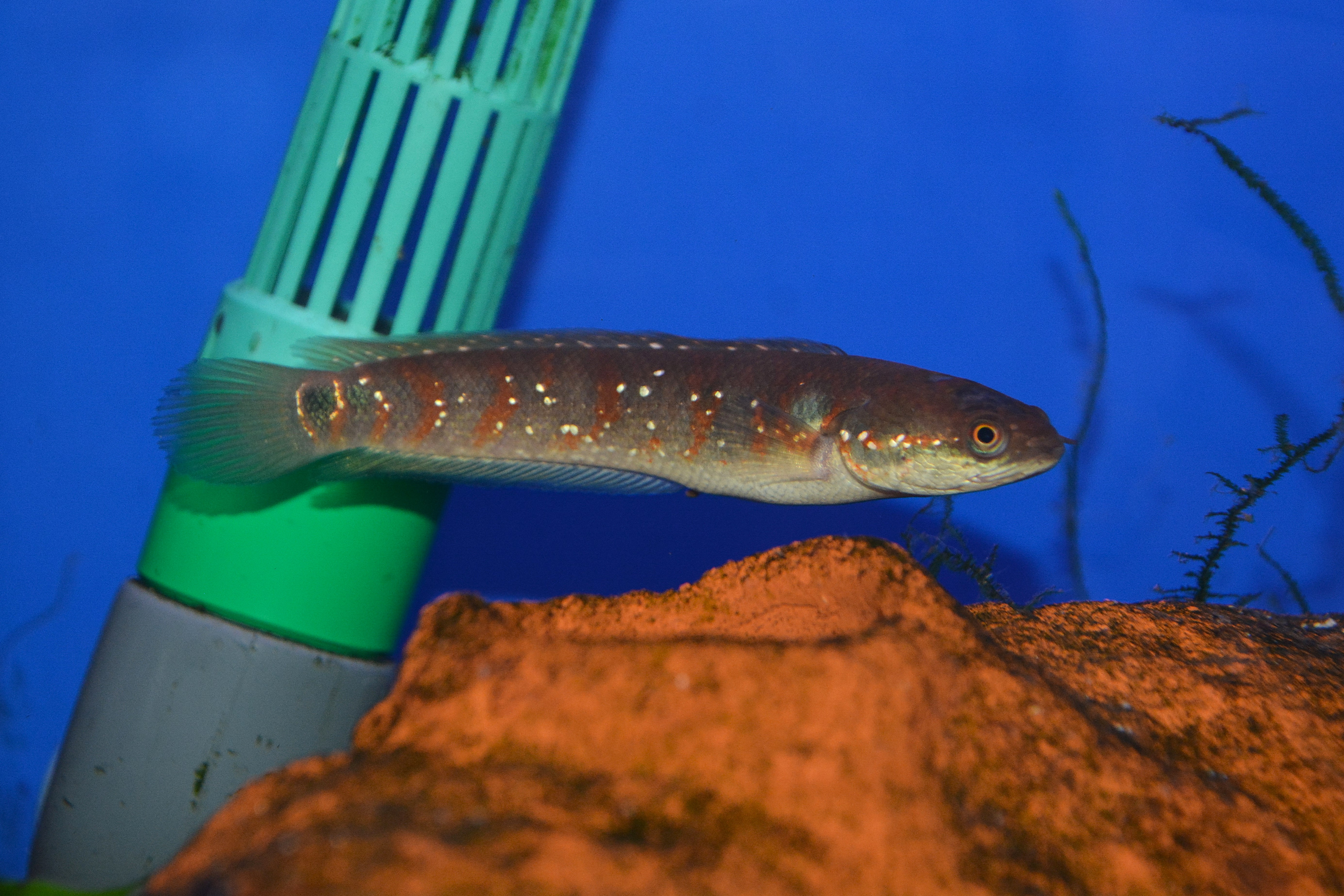

Conservation status
- Least Concern (IUCN 3.1)

Scientific classification
- Kingdom: Animalia
- Phylum: Chordata
- Class: Actinopterygii
- Order: Anabantiformes
- Family: Channidae
- Genus: Channa
- Species: C. asiatica

Binomial name
- Channa asiatica (Linnaeus, 1758)

Synonyms
- Gymnotus asiaticus Linnaeus, 1758; Channa ocellata Peters, 1864; Channa sinensis Sauvage, 1880; Channa formosana Jordan & Evermann, 1902

= Small snakehead =

Species of fish

The small snakehead (Channa asiatica) is a species of snakehead. It is one of four species of the genus Channa native to China. It also can be found in Taiwan and southern Japan, to which it migrated (or was introduced). It is a medium-sized snakehead which is a nestbuilder (as opposed to the Indian mouthbrooder dwarf snakeheads).
