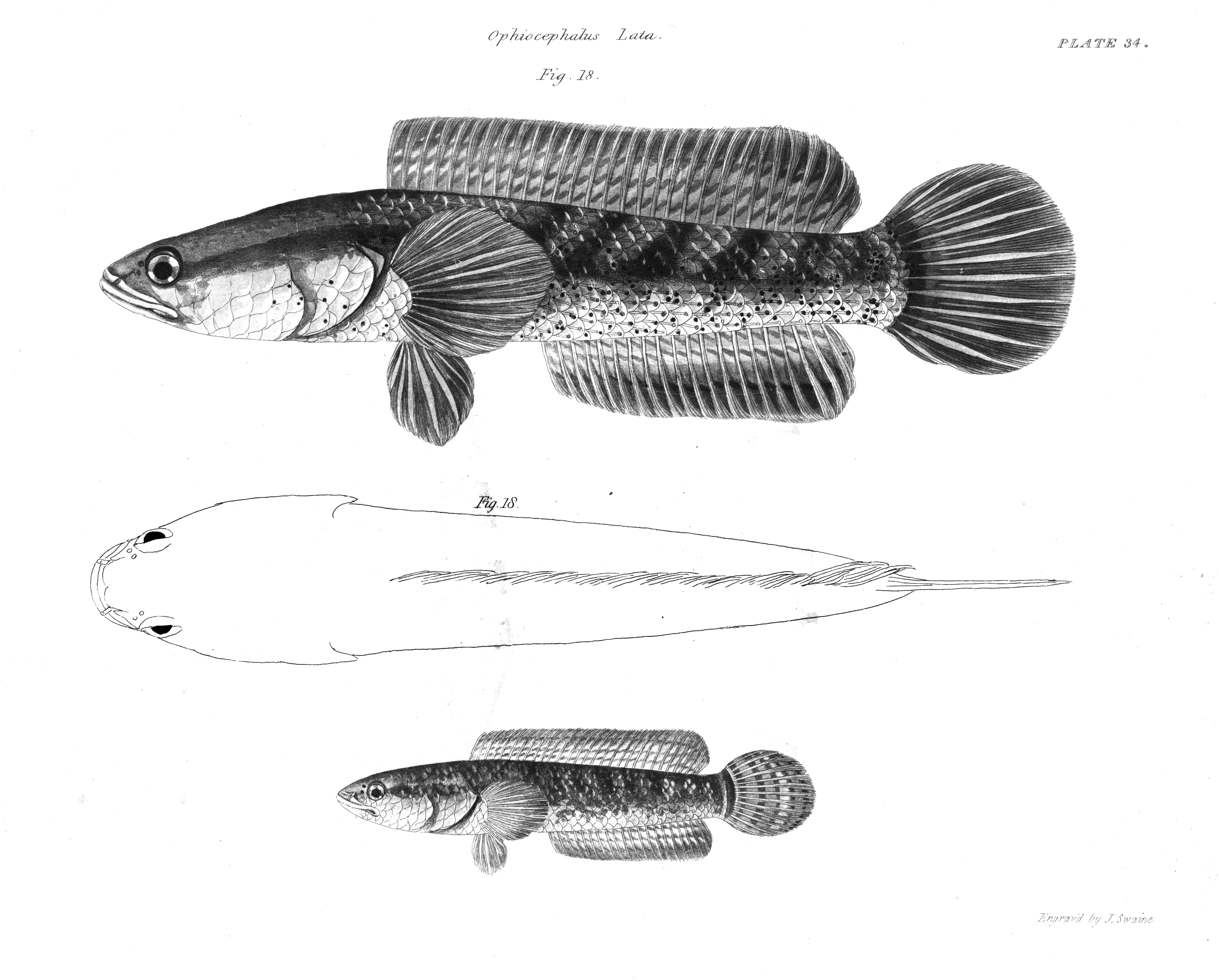

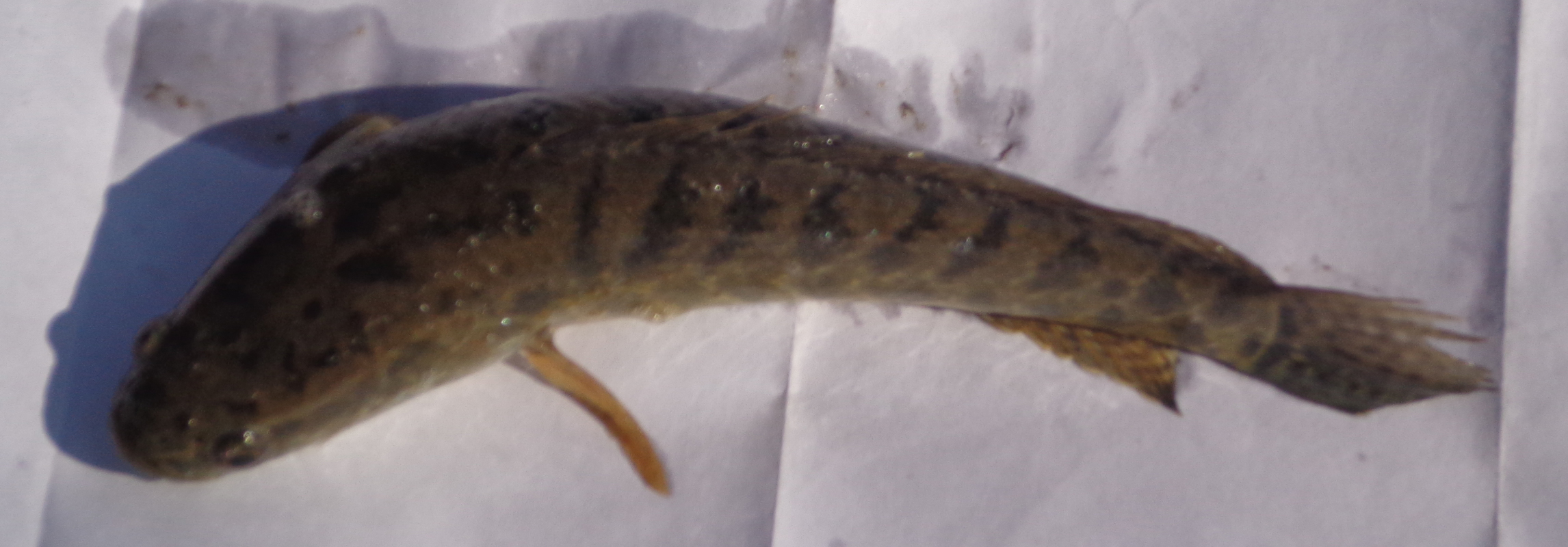

Conservation status
- Least Concern (IUCN 3.1)

Scientific classification
- Kingdom: Animalia
- Phylum: Chordata
- Class: Actinopterygii
- Order: Anabantiformes
- Family: Channidae
- Genus: Channa
- Species: C. punctata

Binomial name
- Channa punctata (Bloch, 1793)

Synonyms
- Ophicephalus punctatus Bloch, 1793; Ophicephalus karruwey Lacépède, 1801; Ophiocephalus lata Hamilton, 1822; Ophicephalus indicus McClelland, 1842; Ophiocephalus affinis Günther, 1861

= Channa punctata =

Spotted snakehead

Species of fish

Channa punctata, the spotted snakehead, is a species of snakehead. It is found in the Indian Subcontinent and nearby areas, ranging across Afghanistan, Pakistan, India, Sri Lanka, Nepal, Bangladesh, Myanmar and Tibet. Its natural habitats are swamps, ponds and brackish water systems. It is a fish of high food value and has little value as aquarium fish.

== Description ==
Channa punctatus normally grows to around 15.0 cm (5.9 in) in length, but males up to 31.0 cm (12.2 in) have also been captured. The spotted snakehead is listed as Least Concern in IUCN, due to lack of major threats to this species populations.

The species is mainly a carnivore. Favorite food of this species is other small fishes yolk flies and fish larvae. In its natural habitat, it consumes crustaceans, molluscs, insects, small fishes, semi-digested materials and sometimes plants. Its feeding habit changes seasonally. The intensity of feeding is low in mature fishes during the spawning period. Juvenile fish has constant habit of food.
