= Channa melanoptera =

Conservation status
- Data Deficient (IUCN 3.1)

Scientific classification
- Kingdom: Animalia
- Phylum: Chordata
- Class: Actinopterygii
- Order: Anabantiformes
- Family: Channidae
- Genus: Channa
- Species: C. melanoptera

Binomial name
- Channa melanoptera (Bleeker, 1855)

Species of fish

Channa melanoptera is a species of the Channidae family. It is found in Borneo and Sumatra and grows up to 65 centimetres (26 in) (total length).
