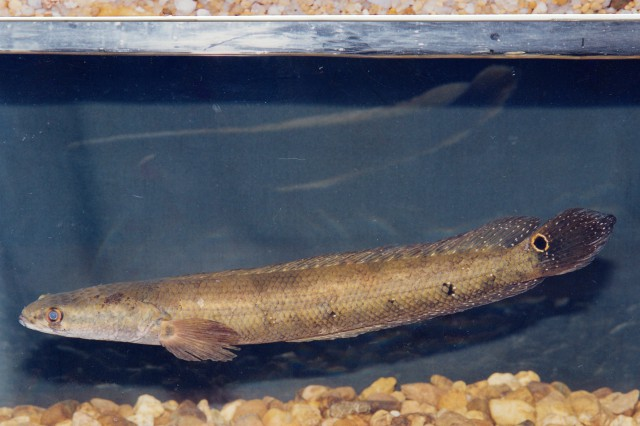

Conservation status
- Least Concern (IUCN 3.1)

Scientific classification
- Kingdom: Animalia
- Phylum: Chordata
- Class: Actinopterygii
- Order: Anabantiformes
- Family: Channidae
- Genus: Channa
- Species: C. marulioides

Binomial name
- Channa marulioides (Bleeker, 1851)

= Channa marulioides =

Species of fish

Channa marulioides, commonly known as the emperor snakehead, is a species of fish in the family Channidae. It is native to parts of Indonesia, Thailand and Malaysia. It reaches a maximum length of 65 cm (26 in).

== Status ==
As of 2019, the IUCN has listed Channa marulioides as Least Concern.
