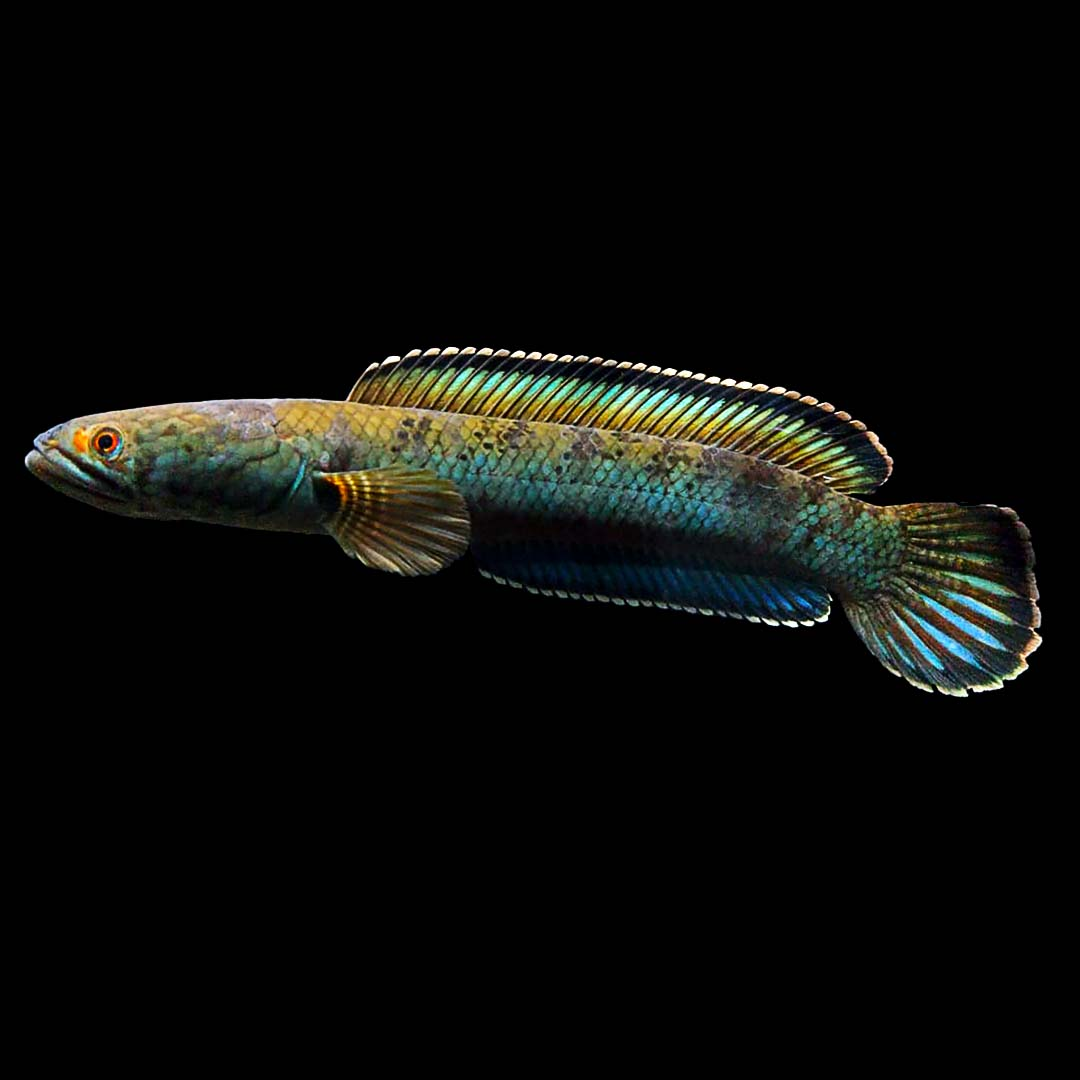

Scientific classification
- Kingdom: Animalia
- Phylum: Chordata
- Class: Actinopterygii
- Division: Teleostei
- Order: Anabantiformes
- Family: Channidae
- Genus: Channa
- Species: C. pardalis

Binomial name
- Channa pardalis Knight, 2016

= Channa pardalis =

Species of fish

Channa pardalis is a species of dwarf snakehead in the genus Channa. It was first described in 2016 from Khasi Hills, Meghalaya of northeastern India. Prior to its scientific description, it was known as Channa sp. "True Blue" or Channa sp. "Meghalaya" in the aquarium trade, although some claim that "Meghalaya" is another, still undescribed species. C. pardalis is closely related to C. bipuli and C. stewartii.
