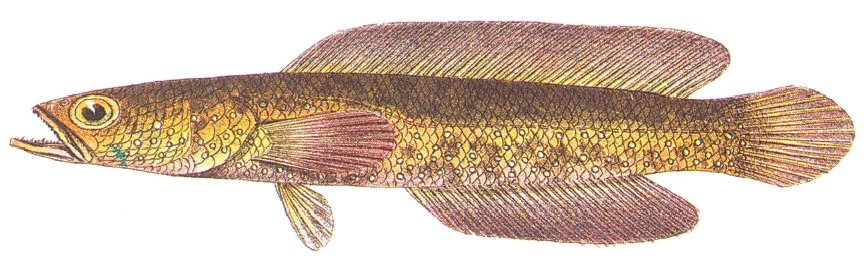
- A depiction of Channa cyanospilos

Conservation status
- Data Deficient (IUCN 3.1)

Scientific classification
- Kingdom: Animalia
- Phylum: Chordata
- Class: Actinopterygii
- Order: Anabantiformes
- Family: Channidae
- Genus: Channa
- Species: C. cyanospilos

Binomial name
- Channa cyanospilos (Bleeker, 1853)

= Channa cyanospilos =

Species of fish

Channa cyanospilos, commonly known as the bluespotted snakehead, is a species of fish in the family Channidae. It has a maximum length of about 20 cm. It is usually found in clear rivers and in black water areas. It is native to parts of Malaysia and Indonesia. It is rarely traded and commonly mistaken for another species.

== Status ==
As of 2020, the IUCN has listed Channa cyanospilos as Data Deficient.
