= Channa pomanensis =

Scientific classification
- Domain: Eukaryota
- Kingdom: Animalia
- Phylum: Chordata
- Class: Actinopterygii
- Order: Anabantiformes
- Family: Channidae
- Genus: Channa
- Species: C. pomanensis

Binomial name
- Channa pomanensis Gurumayum & Tamang, 2016

Species of fish

Channa pomanensis is a species of fish in the Channa genus. The fish maximum length is 17 cm (6.7 in) long (SL).

== Etymology ==
The species epithet pomanensis is named after the Poma River.
