= Channa coccinea =

Scientific classification
- Kingdom: Animalia
- Phylum: Chordata
- Class: Actinopterygii
- Order: Anabantiformes
- Family: Channidae
- Genus: Channa
- Species: C. coccinea

Binomial name
- Channa coccinea Britz, H. H. Tan & Rüber, 2024

Species of fish

Channa coccinea is a species of snakehead fish in the family Channidae. It is a member of the Gachua group and is endemic to northern Myanmar, where it inhabits small mountain streams near Putao in Kachin State. The species was described in 2024 by Ralf Britz, Tan Heok Hui, and Lukas Rüber.

== Taxonomy ==
Channa coccinea belongs to the Gachua group, a clade of small to medium-sized snakeheads distributed across South and Southeast Asia. The holotype (ZRC 64931, 125.4 mm SL) and paratypes were collected from unnamed streams north of Putao in Kachin State.

The species is genetically distinct from other Myanmar Gachua‑group taxa, showing COI divergences of 3.5–19.9% from congeners.

== Description ==
Channa coccinea is an elongate species reaching at least 132.7 mm standard length. The body is round in cross‑section anteriorly and compressed toward the caudal peduncle.

Diagnostic characters include:

- oblique reddish saddle‑like markings on the body
- presence of pelvic fins (absent in sympatric Channa burmanica)
- 36–38 dorsal‑fin rays
- 24–27 anal‑fin rays
- 44–47 vertebrae

Dentition includes multiple rows of small pointed teeth on the premaxilla and dentary, with internal rows of large caniniform teeth on both the dentary and palatine.

== Coloration ==
=== In preservative ===
The body is dark brown‑grey with 6–8 darker saddle‑like blotches along the dorsal‑fin base. The dorsal, anal, and caudal fins are brown‑grey with a narrow white rim. The caudal fin shows darker vertical marbling in a ladder‑like pattern.

=== In life ===
Live individuals exhibit a cream to beige background color with prominent reddish oblique saddle‑like markings extending onto the sides and toward the anal‑fin base. The head is light grey, often with reddish spots on the opercular region. The dorsal fin has a greyish‑blue middle band, a darker subdistal band, and a whitish rim. The caudal fin shows reddish marbling with cream interspaces and a pale rim. Pectoral fins bear alternating reddish‑brown and cream bands.

== Distribution and habitat ==
Channa coccinea is known only from streams near the town of Putao, in northern Kachin State, Myanmar. These are small, clear, cool mountain streams at the foothills of the Eastern Himalayas.

== Etymology ==
The specific epithet coccinea derives from the Latin for red like a berry, referring to reddish markings on head and sides of body.
