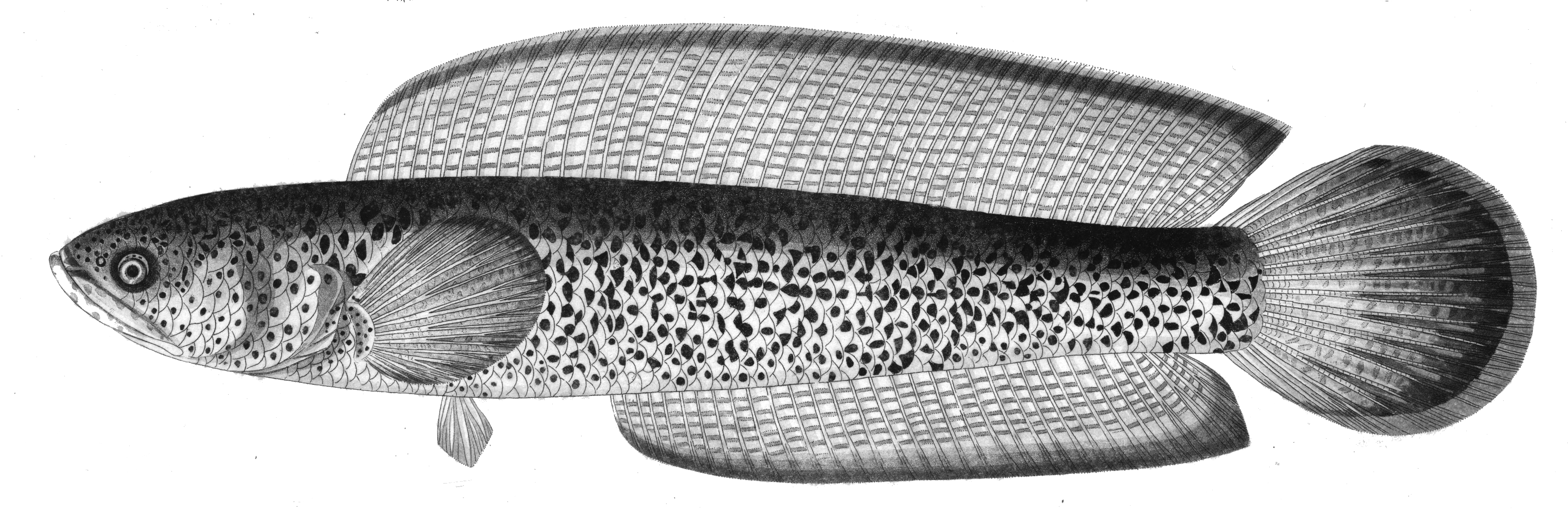

Conservation status
- Data Deficient (IUCN 3.1)

Scientific classification
- Kingdom: Animalia
- Phylum: Chordata
- Class: Actinopterygii
- Order: Anabantiformes
- Family: Channidae
- Genus: Channa
- Species: C. barca

Binomial name
- Channa barca (F. Hamilton, 1822)

Synonyms
- Ophiocephalus barca Hamilton, 1822; Ophicephalus nigricans Cuvier, 1831

= Barca snakehead =

Species of fish

The Barca snakehead (Channa barca) is a rare species of snakehead. It is endemic to the upper Brahmaputra River basin in northeastern India and Bangladesh. Records from Nepal are of doubtful validity. Overall it has been assessed as data deficient by the IUCN, and in 2014 it was assessed as critically endangered in Bangladesh by the IUCN. In Assam, it is locally known as cheng garaka or garaka cheng.

This is a relatively large snakehead, reaching a total length of up to 105 cm (3.4 ft). The species is regarded as an excellent food fish, and it is also highly desired by aquarists, but its rarity, behavior and large size makes it unsuitable for most aquariums.

== Distribution, habitat and behavior ==
The barca snakehead is only known from the upper Brahmaputra River basin the Assam and Nagaland in India, and Sylhet in Bangladesh. Records from Nepal are of doubtful validity. It mostly inhabits wetlands, often near the margins, but can also be seen in riverine habitats. It is able to withstand large variations in water temperature and oxygen levels as its habitat experiences large seasonal changes in flood levels. It often inhabits a vertical tunnel that typically is around one metre (3.3 ft) long and goes down to the water table. The tunnel ends in a chamber where the fish may spend the dry season when the wetlands above it disappear. Some other snakeheads that inhabit the same general region as the barca snakehead have also been reported to "hibernate" during the dry season, including the closely related orange-spotted snakehead (C. aurantimaculata). The overall conservation status of the barca snakehead is poorly known, but it appears to generally be a scarce or rare species.

The species is highly carnivorous, feeding mostly on fish. Little is known about the breeding behavior, but like its nearest relatives it is likely a mouthbrooder. Maturity may occur when only 12.5 cm (5 in) long, but most individuals are around two or three times that size before they reach it. The breeding season is prolonged and begins when the beels they inhabit are flooded by pre-monsoonal rain in April–May. The species has a low fecundity and both parents take care of the young.
