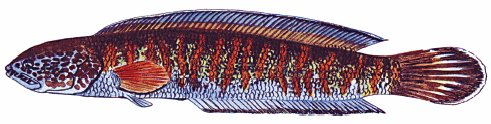
- After Shaw and Shebbeare, 1938

Conservation status
- Least Concern (IUCN 3.1)

Scientific classification
- Kingdom: Animalia
- Phylum: Chordata
- Class: Actinopterygii
- Order: Anabantiformes
- Family: Channidae
- Genus: Channa
- Species: C. amphibeus

Binomial name
- Channa amphibeus (McClelland, 1845)

Synonyms
- Ophiocephalus amphibeus McClelland, 1845

= Borna snakehead =

Species of fish

The Borna snakehead, or Chel snakehead, Channa amphibeus, is an extremely rare species of snakehead. C. amphibeus is native only to the Chel River (in the drainage of the Brahmaputra), of the Bhutan foothills, in northern Bengal, India.

As with all snakeheads, C. amphibeus is an aggressive predator. The fish grows up to about 25 cm (10 inches). C. amphibeus requires warm fresh water (about 22–28˚C) to properly mature, and access to atmospheric oxygen. It was reported that during rainy periods, young are found "in flooded paddy-fields enclosed by forest; large fish can be found in pools of dried streams in forests." This is a manifestation of behavior common to snakeheads – they need atmospheric air, which they receive by way of a suprabranchial organ (a primitive form of a labyrinth organ). From a young age, C. amphibeus can survive in a low-oxygen water habitat, but if deprived of surface access, adult snakeheads can die from the lack of oxygen.

Due to its smaller size (in comparison to other snakeheads), the Chel snakehead is slightly easier to keep in aquaria. However, there have been several episodes when snakeheads have been released into non-endemic environments, and the danger of the hardy, gregarious fish becoming a serious invasive species is very large (although for this species, this phenomenon has not yet transpired due to its relative rarity).

Alternate binomial names include Ophiocephalus amphibeus. Names in northern Bengal include bora cheng (Mechi) and borna (Rabha).
