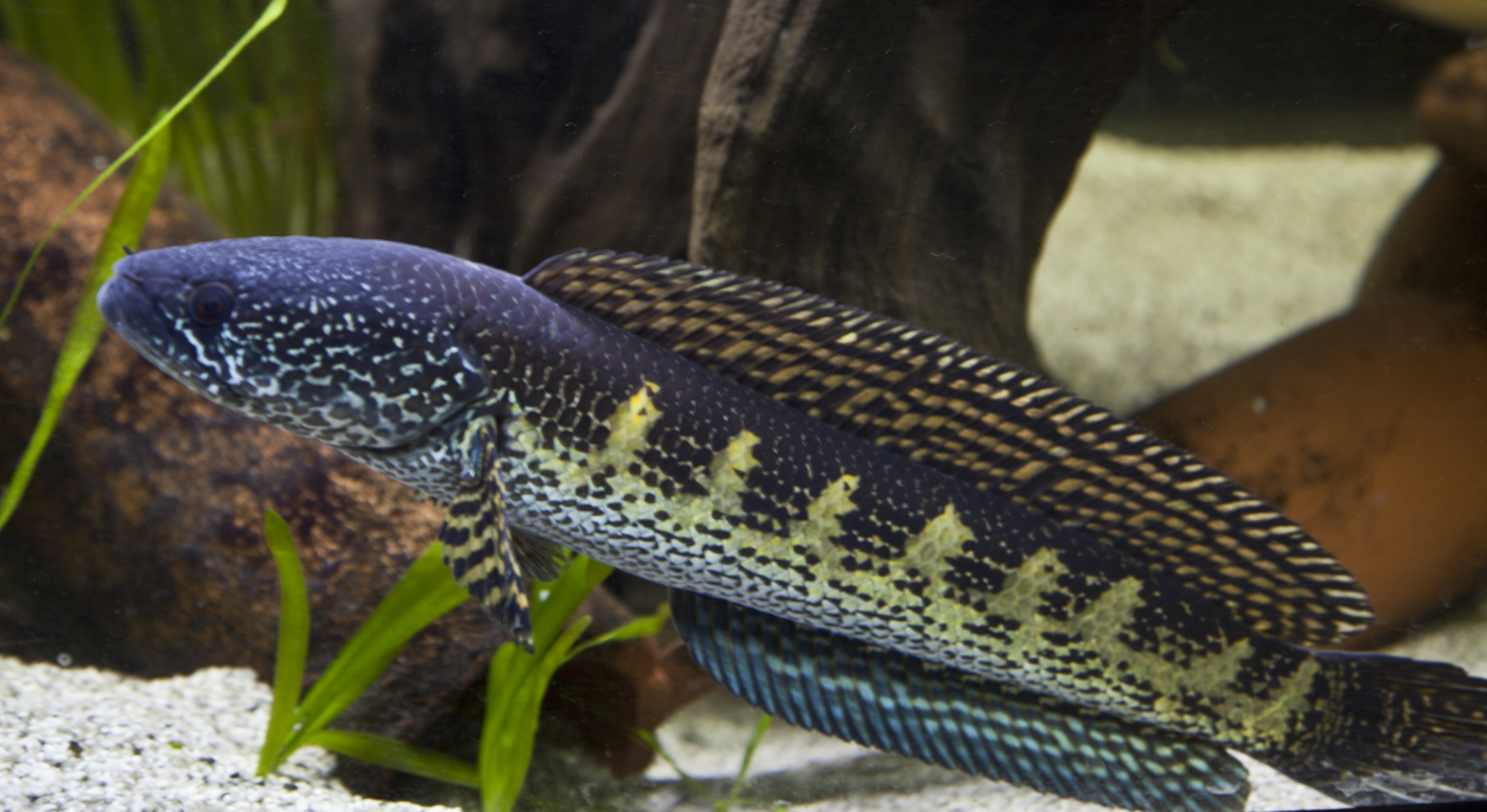

Conservation status
- Data Deficient (IUCN 3.1)

Scientific classification
- Kingdom: Animalia
- Phylum: Chordata
- Class: Actinopterygii
- Division: Teleostei
- Order: Anabantiformes
- Family: Channidae
- Genus: Channa
- Species: C. aurantimaculata

Binomial name
- Channa aurantimaculata Musikasinthorn, 2000

= Orange-spotted snakehead =

Species of fish

The orange-spotted snakehead (Channa aurantimaculata) is a species of freshwater ray-finned fish in the snakehead family Channidae.

== Distribution ==
The orange-spotted snakehead is endemic to Brahmaputra River basin, and the type locality is Dibrugarh (which the Brahmaputra River flows through), the most northeastern area of Assam, India. Several other snakehead species, such as Channa bleheri (whose type locality is also Dibrugarh), are found in the same region.

== Description ==
The body of this snakehead is brownish, with several vertical orange stripes on it. Males have taller dorsal fins with more intense coloration, as well as narrower heads. The orange-spotted snakehead grows to 40 cm (16 in).

== Biology ==
The orange-spotted snakehead is probably a mouthbrooder, like most other smaller snakeheads. Like many other anabantiforms, this species is capable of breathing air, and will actually suffocate if it cannot reach the surface for a prolonged period of time.

== In the aquarium ==
The orange-spotted snakehead is predatory, so it should not be housed with smaller fishes. It is comfortable in a water temperature within the range of 15–29 °C (59–84 °F), and a pH of around 7. It requires a large, dimly lit, well-planted tank with places to hide.
