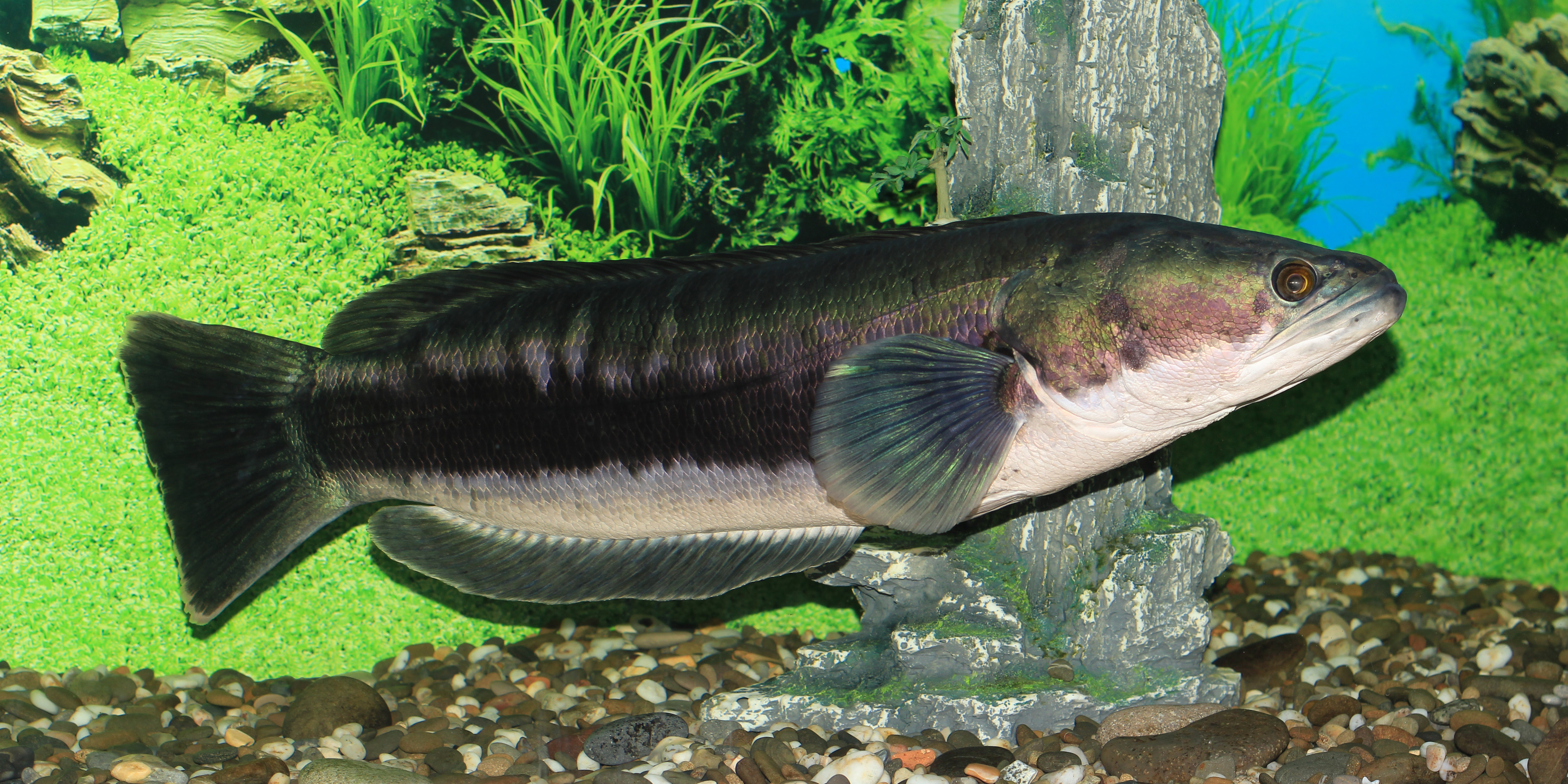

Conservation status
- Least Concern (IUCN 3.1)

Scientific classification
- Kingdom: Animalia
- Phylum: Chordata
- Class: Actinopterygii
- Order: Anabantiformes
- Family: Channidae
- Genus: Channa
- Species: C. micropeltes

Binomial name
- Channa micropeltes (G. Cuvier, 1831)

Synonyms
- Ophicephalus micropeltes Cuvier, 1831; Ophicephalus serpentinus Cuvier, 1831; Ophicephalus bivittatus Bleeker, 1845; Ophicephalus stevensii Bleeker, 1854; Ophiocephalus studeri Volz, 1903

= Channa micropeltes =

Giant snakehead

Species of fish

Capture (blue) and aquaculture (green) production of Channa micropeltes in thousand tonnes from 1950 to 2022, as reported by the FAO

Channa micropeltes, giant snakehead, giant mudfish or toman harimau, is among the largest species in the family Channidae, capable of growing to 1.8 m (5.9 ft) in length and a weight of 30 kg (66 lb). It is native to the fresh waters of Southeast Asia (South Indian populations are now regarded as a separate species, C. diplogramma), but has also been introduced elsewhere and is considered invasive in Taiwan. Other names include shol machh (শোল মাছ ) in Bengali, red snakehead, redline snakehead, and ikan toman (where ikan is fish in Malay and Indonesian).

== Biology ==
The young of the C.micropeltes are red in color, with orange and black lateral stripes appearing after about two months. As the giant snakehead matures, it loses its stripes and redness, and instead develops a bluish-black and white pattern on its upper body. Juveniles sold in the aquarium fish trade are commonly called "red snakeheads". They can get up to 1.3 m (4.3 ft) long and a weigh 20 kg (44 lb).

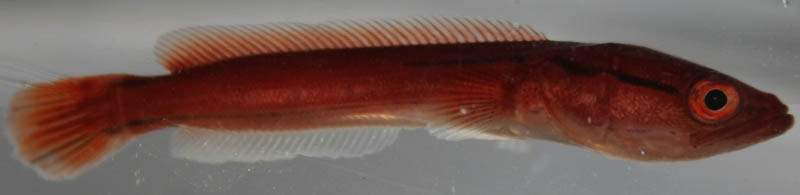
Two-cm-long fry: Its color when young explains another of its names, the red snakehead.

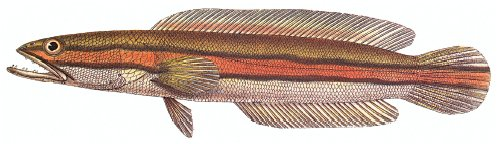
After Bleeker, 1878; juvenile. USGS 2004

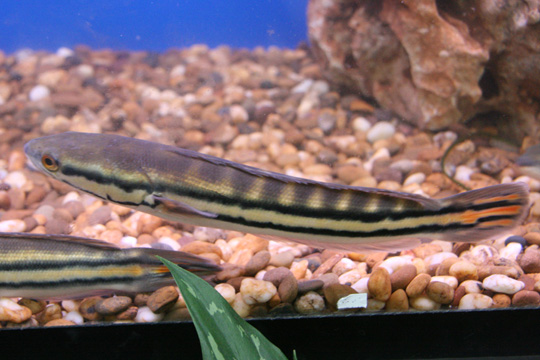
Near-adult juveniles

The species has the ability to crawl onto land and breathe air, although they are only able to do this in muddy or swampy areas, hence the nickname "mudfish".

Its ability to breathe air using a primitive lung located just behind the gills allows it to survive in stagnant water where oxygen levels are low, by coming to the surface and taking a small gulp of air. It also enables the snakehead to travel short distances on land, although it is unable to hunt while on land, as it cannot support itself at all with its small fins in comparison to its large body.

== Distribution ==
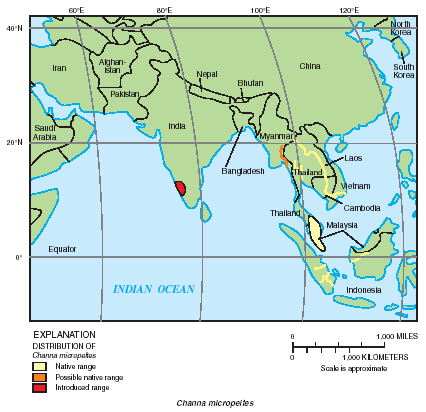
Distribution of Channa micropeltes, USGS 2004. The Indian population (red), referred to as "introduced", is actually C. diplogramma, which used to be considered a synonym of C. micropeltes

C. micropeltes is found in Southeast Asia, Malay Peninsula, and Indonesia . It used to be believed to have an oddly disjunctive distribution, inhabiting both Southeast Asia and southwest India and Bangladesh, about 2,500 km (1,600 mi) apart. The Indian population was speculated to be from an early human introduction, prior to the 19th century. In 2011, the Southeast Asian and Indian populations were found to be separate species, with the latter correctly named C. diplogramma (leaving C. micropeltes for the Southeast Asian population).

This fish is reported to be highly suitable for culture in cages or ponds in combination with tilapia. It is found to be an effective tool in controlling the overpopulation of tilapia, which checks the stunted growth of tilapia.

== As an invasive species ==
As the result of human introductions, C. micropeltes has been reported in six US states: Maine, Massachusetts, Tennessee, Wisconsin, Maryland and Rhode Island. It is not believed to be established in the U.S., however, unlike the northern snakehead (C. argus), its temperate relative.

In Maryland, three specimens were caught in the early 2000s, two in open waters and one in the shallows of the Inner Harbor in Baltimore. In 2003, an example was caught in Rock River, Wisconsin. Biologists were concerned that warm water effluents could allow the tropical species to survive in colder climates, but as yet there is no evidence of established populations anywhere in the United States, with all catches believed to be aquarium releases.

In 2010, one was found dead on the shores of the Saint-Charles River, in Quebec City, Canada. It was obviously an aquarium release.

The species is well-established throughout Taiwan and is considered invasive at least in Sun Moon Lake. An attempt is made at controlling the species in Sun Moon Lake through a targeted fishery for mature pre-spawn females.

In 2025, the National Aquatic Resources Research and Development Agency (NARA) of Sri Lanka reported the existence of C. micropeltes in the Deduru Oya reservoir, with earlier sightings dating back to 2024, posing a significant threat to other fish species in the reservoir and, in turn, the freshwater fishing industry.

=== Hoax ===
In 2005, a specimen of C. micropeltes was reportedly caught by an angler while fishing for pike on the River Witham in Lincolnshire, England. The claim of this catch is highly peculiar, as it was reportedly caught in late winter, and being a tropical species, it would not have been able to survive, let alone feed in an English river during winter. It was later determined to be a hoax; the fish had actually been found dead in a street.

== Use as food ==
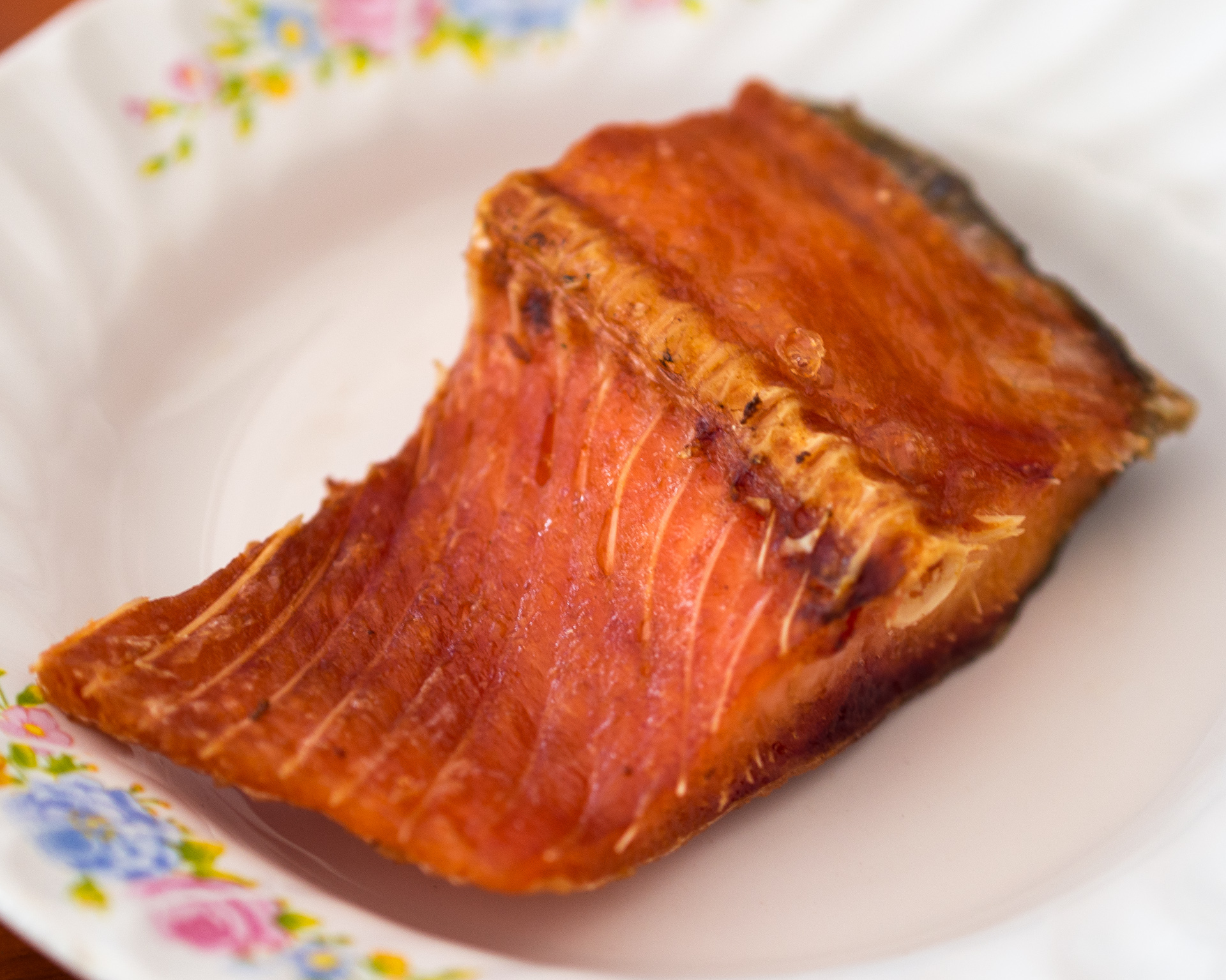
Pla buang is a northern Thai dish of sun-dried and deep-fried giant snakehead

In Malaysia, Singapore, and Indonesia, the fish is known locally as toman and is cultured in fish ponds and reservoirs as game fish because they put up a strong fight when hooked. The giant snakehead is also a good fish to eat, and is often served in Chinese restaurants.

In Thailand, this fish is prepared in a variety of ways, especially grilled, being a common food item offered by street vendors.

In traditional Chinese medicine theory, eating this fish is believed to help in healing of the body, for example, after surgery or severe cuts and scrapes.

== In the aquarium ==
C. micropeltes, frequently referred to as the red or redline snakehead in the fishkeeping hobby, is a popular fish to be sold in the pet trade. Juveniles are commonly sold as pets. Some are even sold as feeders to be fed to larger carnivorous fish. They are voracious predators that will chase and eat anything that fits in their mouths. Due to this, they are called "freshwater great whites". They can successfully be housed, though, with silver arowanas, clown knifefishes, oscars, and other fish from same size group.
