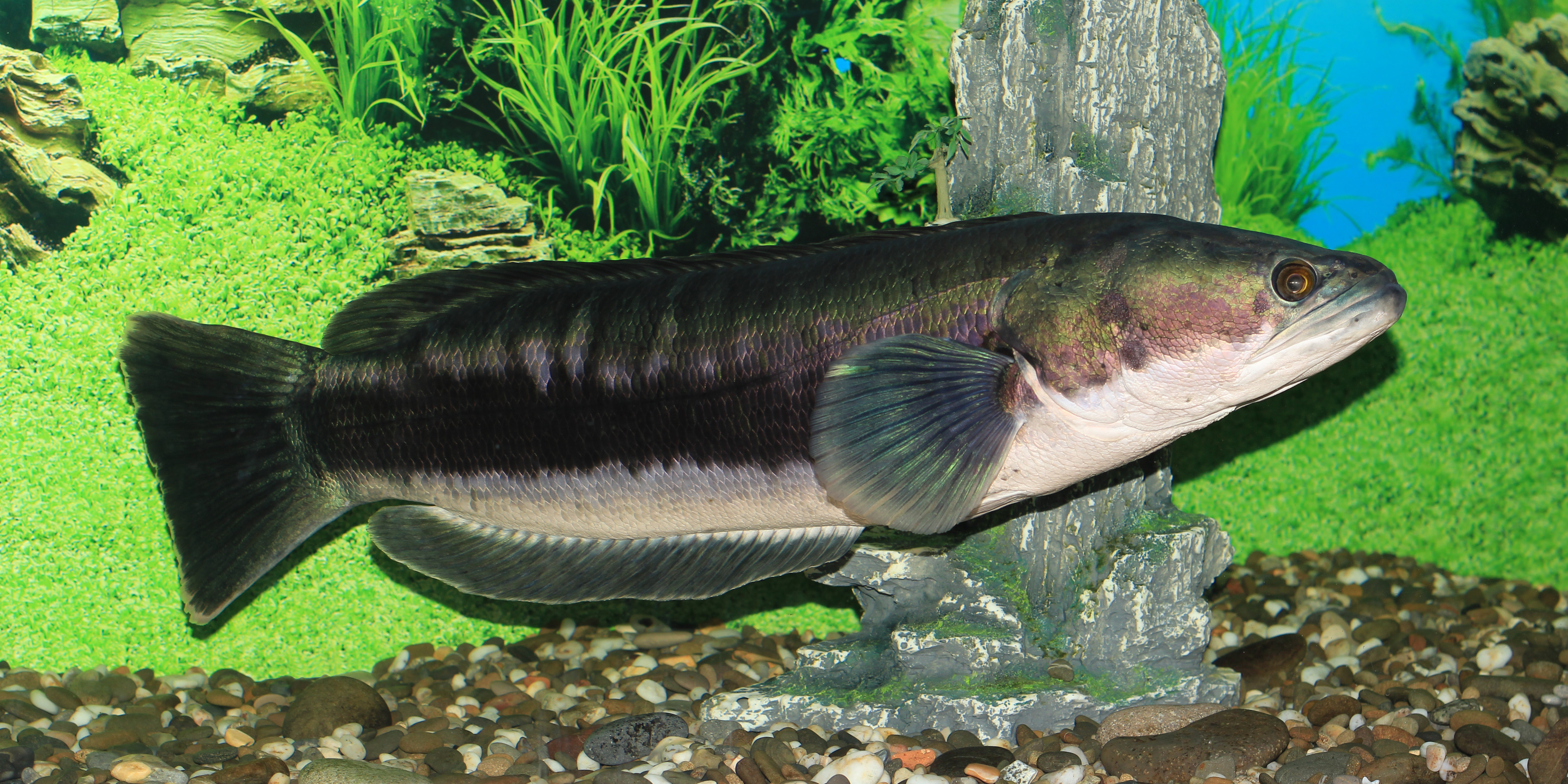

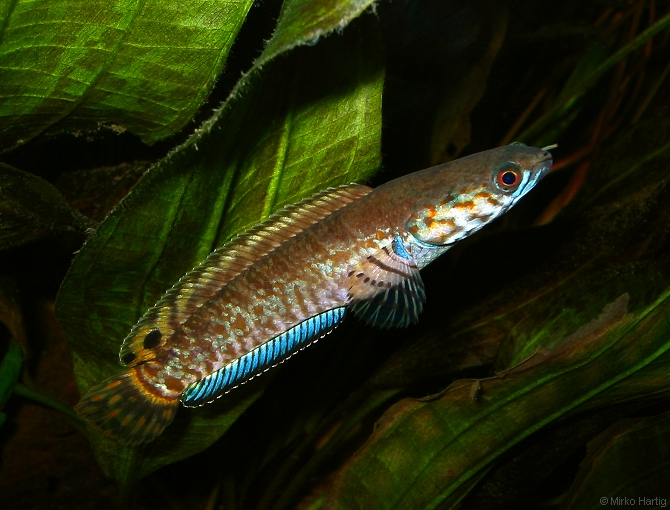
- Channa micropeltes (above, one of the largest species) and C. bleheri (below, one of the smallest)

Scientific classification
- Kingdom: Animalia
- Phylum: Chordata
- Class: Actinopterygii
- Division: Teleostei
- Order: Anabantiformes
- Family: Channidae
- Genus: Channa; Scopoli, 1777

Type species
- Channa orientalis Bloch & J. G. Schneider, 1801
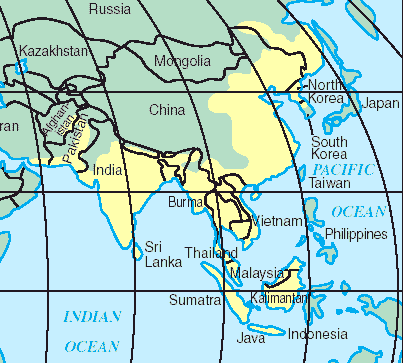
- Combined natural range of the Channa species

Synonyms
- Bostrychoides Lacépède, 1801; Ophiocephalus Bloch, 1793; Philypnoides Bleeker, 1849; Psiloides Fischer, 1813; Pterops Rafinesque, 1815

= Channa =

Genus of fishes

Channa is a genus of predatory fish in the family Channidae, commonly known as snakeheads, native to freshwater habitats in Asia. This genus contains about 50 scientifically described species. The genus has a wide natural distribution extending from Iraq in the west, to Indonesia and China in the east, and parts of Siberia in the Far East. A particularly high richness of species exists in Myanmar (Burma), Bangladesh and northeastern India, and many Channa species live nowhere else. In contrast, a few widespread species have been introduced to several regions outside their natural range, where they often become invasive. The large and medium-sized Channa species are among the most common staple food fish in several Asian countries, and they are extensively cultured. Apart from their importance as a food fish, snakeheads are consumed in some regions as a traditional medicine for wound healing and reducing postoperative pain and discomfort, and collected for the international aquarium pet trade.

All snakeheads are highly predatory, and the diets of the various species of Channa include fish, amphibians (like frogs), snakes, rodents, birds, and invertebrates (insects and crustaceans). They have a labyrinth organ, which allows them to breathe air for short periods, and they use this adaptation to travel across land in the event that their habitat becomes inhospitable. They are mostly solitary or live in monogamous pairs that are highly aggressive towards outsiders of their own species, but C. pleurophthalma often occurs in small groups. Larger species are mostly nestbrooding (making a nest of vegetation at the water surface), and the dwarfs mostly paternal mouthbrooding, but exceptions occur; the large C. barca is a paternal mouthbrooder and the dwarf C. bleheri is a free-spawner (the eggs float to the surface where the parents take care of them, but they do not mouthbrood or built a nest). Some species in the Channa gachua group also provision their offspring with trophic eggs. Females of Channa andrao and C. gachua have been observed releasing unfertilised eggs above newly hatched larvae, which consume the eggs. Similar trophic-egg provisioning has been observed in several other species of the C. gachua group, suggesting that the behaviour may be widespread within the group.

== Taxonomy ==
The taxonomy of the genus Channa is incomplete, and a comprehensive revision of the family has not been performed. A phylogenetic study in 2010 has indicated the likelihood of the existence of undescribed species of channids in Southeast Asia, and a more comprehensive phylogenetic study in 2017 indicated that several undescribed species exist in Asia (as well as an undescribed Parachanna in Africa). In 2011, the Malabar snakehead Channa diplogramma from peninsular India was shown to be a distinct species, 146 years after its initial description and 134 years after it was synonymised with C. micropeltes, establishing it is an endemic species of peninsular India. The study also suggested that the species shared a most recent common ancestor with C. micropeltes, around 9.52 to 21.76 MYA.

=== Species ===
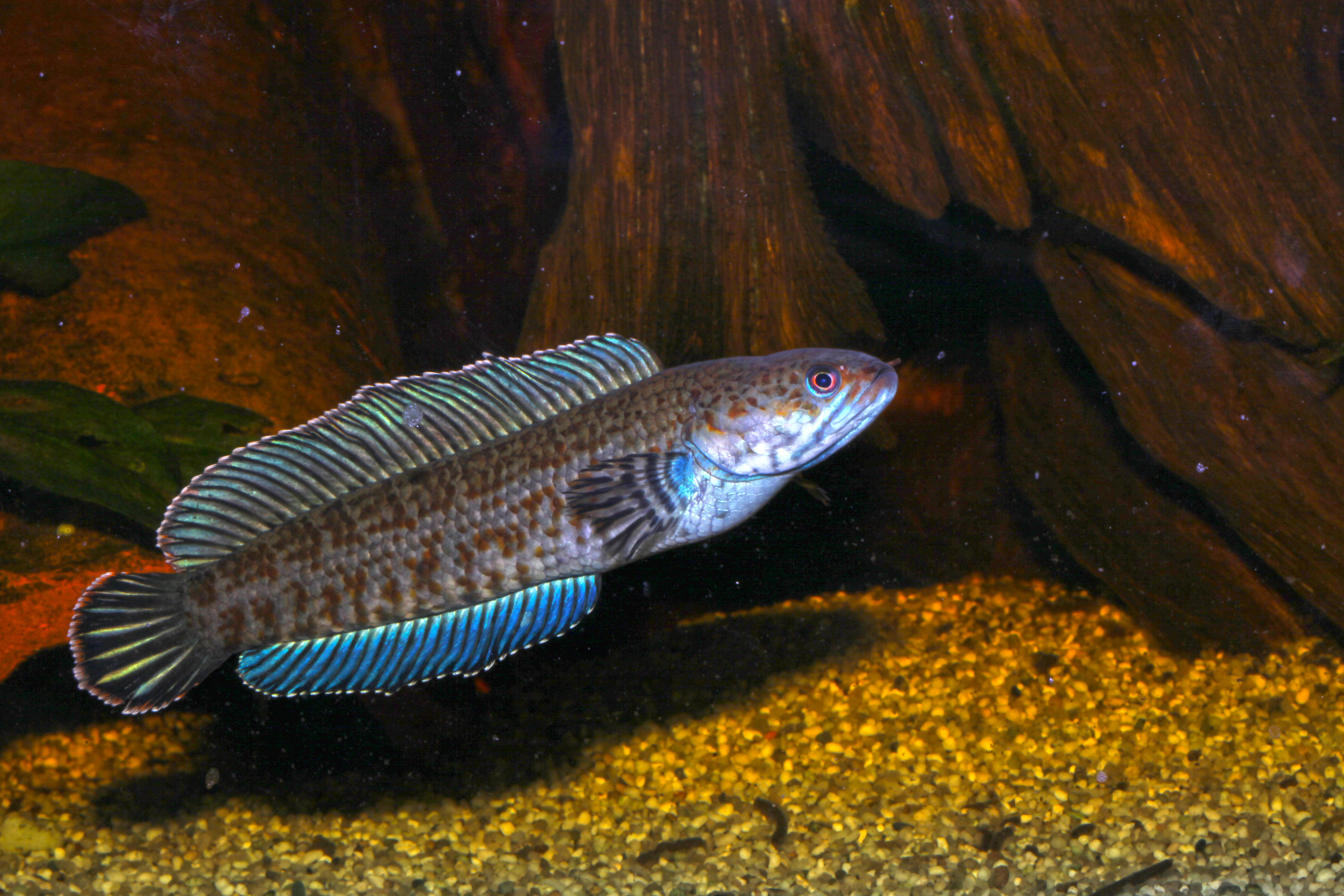
Channa andrao

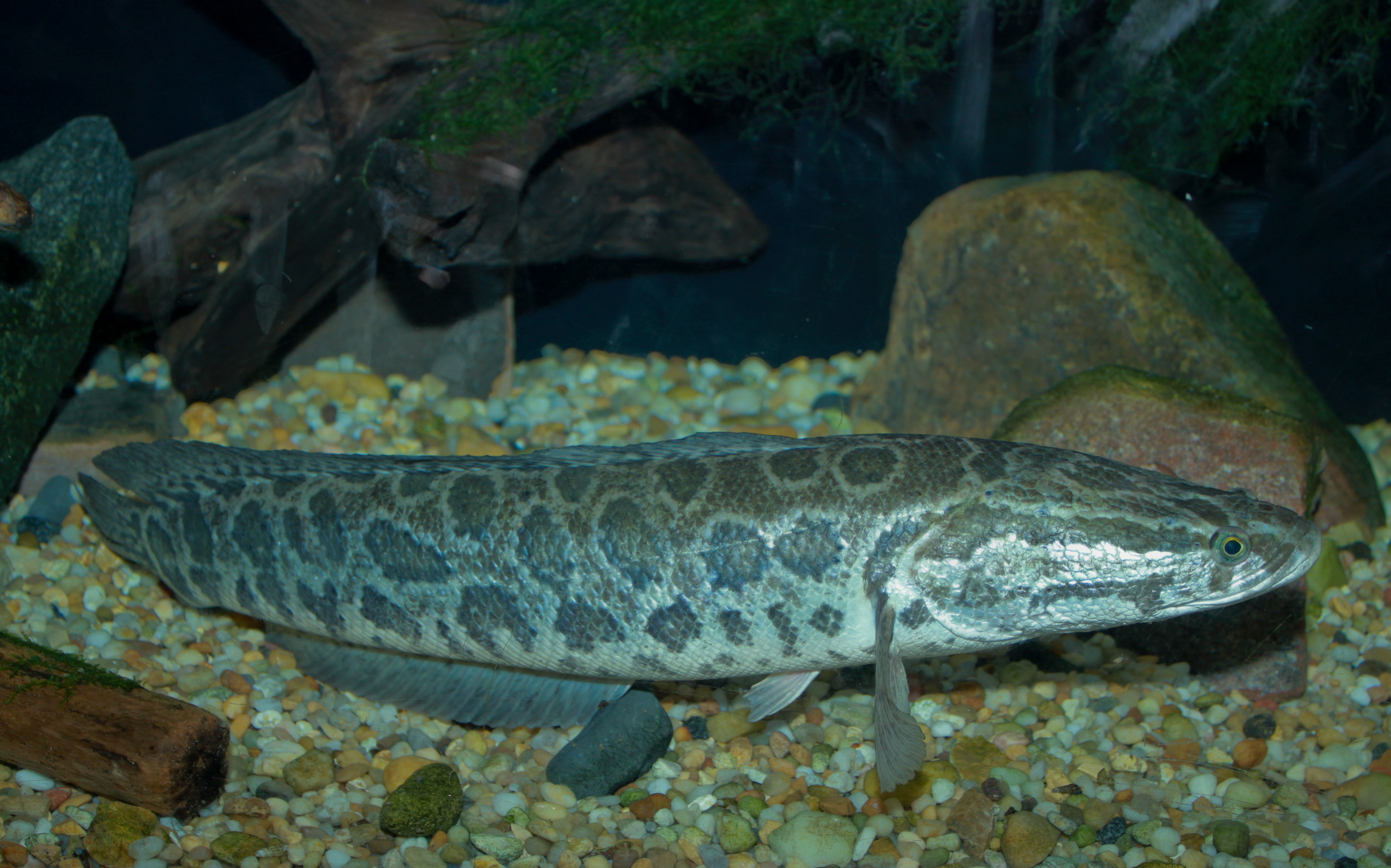
Channa argus

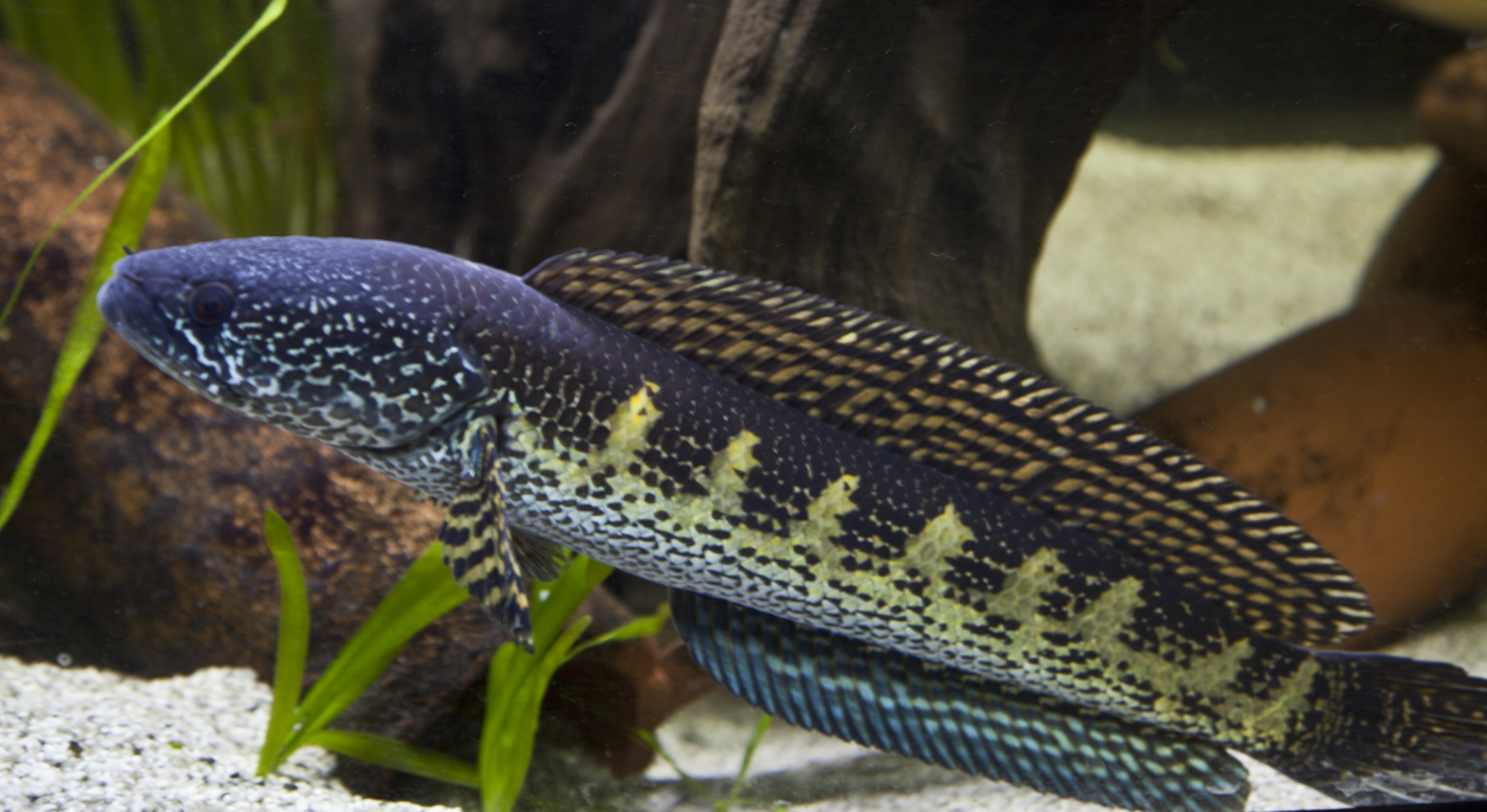
Channa aurantimaculata

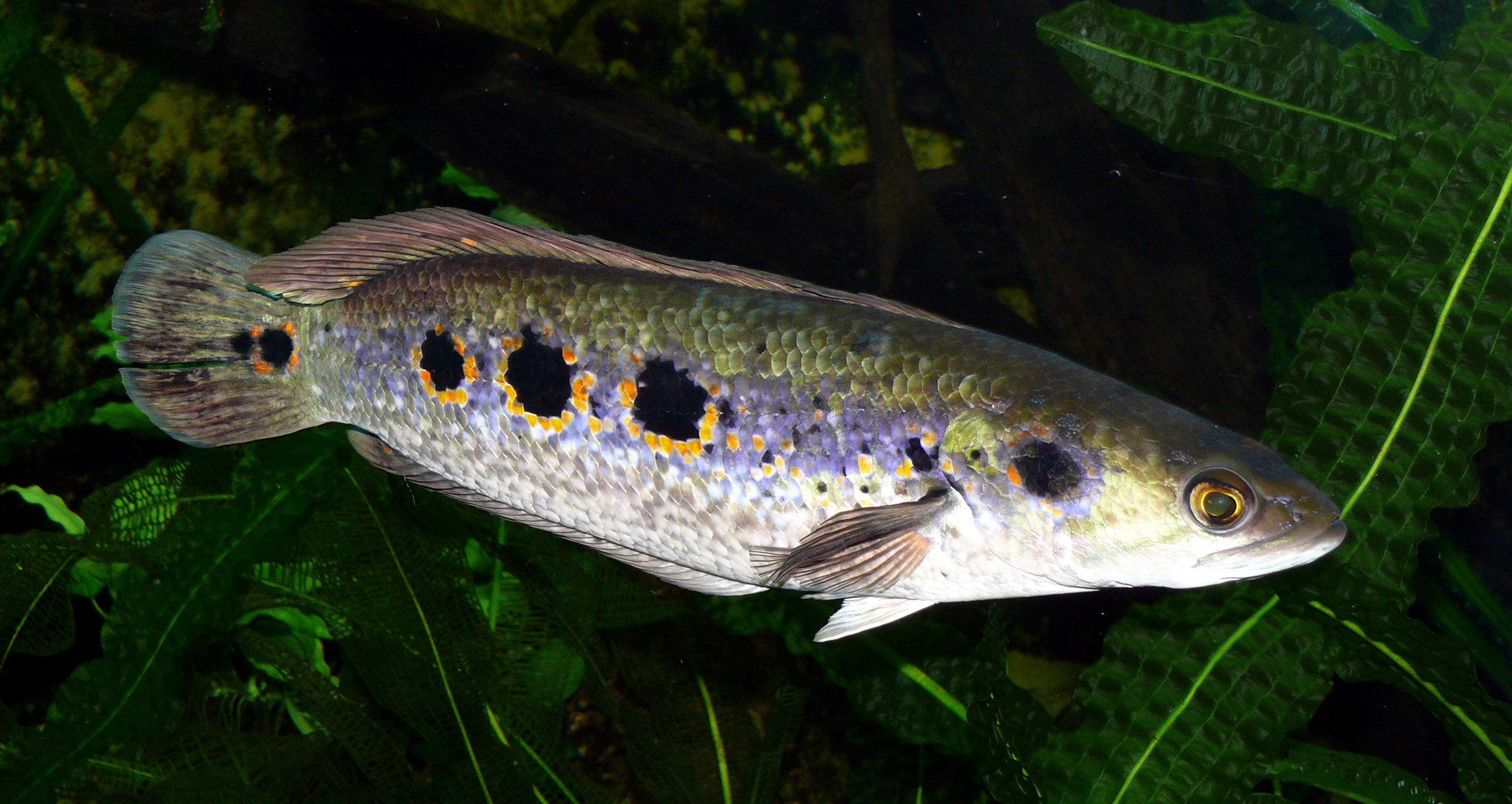
Channa pleurophthalma

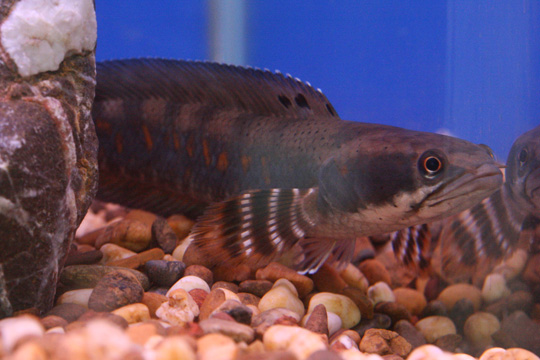
Channa pulchra

Currently, 50 recognized species are placed in this genus:

- Channa amari Dey et al., 2019 — likely a synonym of C. brunnea
- Channa amphibeus (McClelland, 1845) (Borna snakehead)
- Channa andrao Britz, 2013
- Channa ara (Deraniyagala, 1945)
- Channa argus (Cantor, 1842) (northern snakehead)
- Channa aristonei Praveenraj, Thackeray, Singh, Uma, Moulitharan & Mukhim, 2020
- Channa asiatica (Linnaeus, 1758) (small snakehead)
- Channa aurantimaculata Musikasinthorn, 2000 (orange-spotted snakehead)
- Channa aurantipectoralis Lalhlimpuia, Lalronunga & Lalramliana, 2016
- Channa auroflammea Adamson, Britz and S. Lieng, 2019
- Channa aurolineata (F. Day, 1870)
- Channa bankanensis (Bleeker, 1853)
- Channa baramensis (Steindachner, 1901)
- Channa barca (F. Hamilton, 1822) (barca snakehead)
- Channa bipuli Praveenraj, Uma, Moulitharan & Bleher, 2018
- Channa bleheri Vierke, 1991 (rainbow snakehead)
- Channa brahmacharyi Chakraborty, Yardi & Mukherjee, 2020
- Channa brunnea Praveenraj, Uma, Moulitharan & Kannan, 2019
- Channa burmanica B. L. Chaudhuri, 1919
- Channa coccinea Britz, H. H. Tan & Rüber, 2024
- Channa cyanospilos (Bleeker, 1853)
- Channa diplogramma (F. Day, 1865) (Malabar snakehead)
- Channa gachua (F. Hamilton, 1822) (dwarf snakehead)
- Channa harcourtbutleri (Annandale, 1918) (Burmese snakehead)
- Channa hoaluensis Nguyen, 2011
- Channa kelaartii (Günther, 1861)
- Channa limbata (Cuvier, 1831)
- Channa lipor Praveenraj, Uma, Moulitharan & Singh, 2019
- Channa longistomata (Nguyen & Nguyen, 2012)
- Channa lucius (G. Cuvier, 1831) (forest snakehead)
- Channa maculata (Lacépède, 1801) (blotched snakehead)
- Channa marulioides (Bleeker, 1851) (emperor snakehead)
- Channa marulius (F. Hamilton, 1822) (great snakehead)
- Channa melanoptera (Bleeker, 1855)
- Channa melanostigma Geetakumari & Vishwanath Waikhom, 2011
- Channa melasoma (Bleeker, 1851) (black snakehead)
- Channa micropeltes (G. Cuvier, 1831) (giant snakehead)
- Channa ninhbinhensis V. H. Nguyễn, 2011
- Channa nox C. G. Zhang, Musikasinthorn & Watanabe, 2002 (night snakehead)
- Channa orientalis Bloch & J. G. Schneider, 1801 (Ceylon snakehead)
- Channa ornatipinnis Britz, 2008
- Channa panaw Musikasinthorn, 1998 (Panaw snakehead)
- Channa pardalis Knight, 2016
- Channa pleurophthalma (Bleeker, 1851)
- Channa pomanensis Gurumayum & Tamang, 2016
- Channa pseudomarulius (Günther, 1861)
- Channa pulchra Britz, 2007
- Channa punctata (Bloch, 1793) (spotted snakehead)
- Channa pyrophthalmus Ralf Britz, Tan Heok Hui, & Lukas Rüber, 2024
- Channa quinquefasciata Praveenraj et al., 2018
- Channa rakhinica Ralf Britz, Tan Heok Hui, & Lukas Rüber, 2024
- Channa rara Britz, Dahanukar, Anoop & Ali, 2019
- Channa royi Praveenraj et al., 2018 (Andaman emerald snakehead) — likely a synonym of C. harcourtbutleri
- Channa rubora Ralf Britz, Tan Heok Hui, & Lukas Rüber, 2024
- Channa shingon M. Endruweit, 2017)
- Channa stewartii (Playfair (fr), 1867) (Assamese snakehead)
- Channa stiktos Lalramliana, Knight, Lalhlimpuia & Singh, 2018
- Channa striata (Bloch, 1793) (striped snakehead)
