= Channa burmanica =

Conservation status
- Least Concern (IUCN 3.1)

Scientific classification
- Kingdom: Animalia
- Phylum: Chordata
- Class: Actinopterygii
- Order: Anabantiformes
- Family: Channidae
- Genus: Channa
- Species: C. burmanica

Binomial name
- Channa burmanica B. L. Chaudhuri, 1919

Species of fish

Channa burmanica is a species of snakehead which is endemic to northern Burma. It is a very small species of snakehead included in the informal group of dwarf snakeheads. Its colouring closely resembles that of Channa gachua and Channa bleheri. It is very rarely found in pet shops. It is also considered to be a mouthbrooder species, though no successful breeding has yet occurred.
