= Black snakehead =

Conservation status
- Least Concern (IUCN 3.1)

Scientific classification
- Kingdom: Animalia
- Phylum: Chordata
- Class: Actinopterygii
- Order: Anabantiformes
- Family: Channidae
- Genus: Channa
- Species: C. melasoma

Binomial name
- Channa melasoma (Bleeker, 1851)

Synonyms
- Ophicephalus melasoma Bleeker, 1851; Ophicephalus mystax Bleeker, 1853; Ophicephalus rhodotaenia Bleeker, 1851; Ophiocephalus melasoma Bleeker, 1851

Species of fish

The black snakehead (Channa melasoma) is a species of snakehead native to Thailand, Indonesia, Malaysia, Philippines, and Singapore. This commercially important species reaches a length of 30 cm (12 in). The Black Snakehead inhabits large to medium rivers that consists of acidic water and submerged roots. The Black Snakehead feeds on small animals and harmless to humans beings. Snakehead fish have long, slender bodies with long dorsal and butt-centric balances. They have an extensive mouth and distending jaw with canine-like teeth. ]
