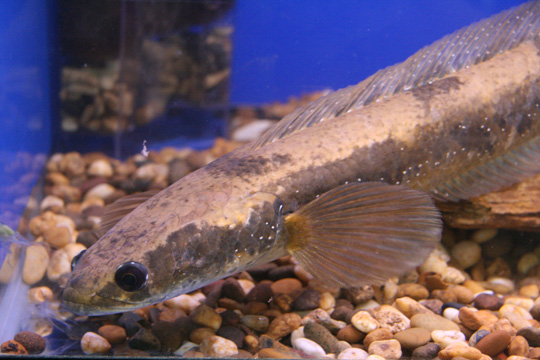

Scientific classification
- Domain: Eukaryota
- Kingdom: Animalia
- Phylum: Chordata
- Class: Actinopterygii
- Order: Anabantiformes
- Family: Channidae
- Genus: Channa
- Species: C. auroflammea

Binomial name
- Channa auroflammea Adamson, Britz & Lieng, 2019

= Channa auroflammea =

Species of fish

Channa auroflammea is a species of snakehead, a fish of the family Channidae. Its range includes Mekong River. It was previously lumped with C. marulius, C. cf. marulius, or C. aff. marulius, but can be distinguished within the group by colour pattern, other morphological characteristics, and genetic information.
