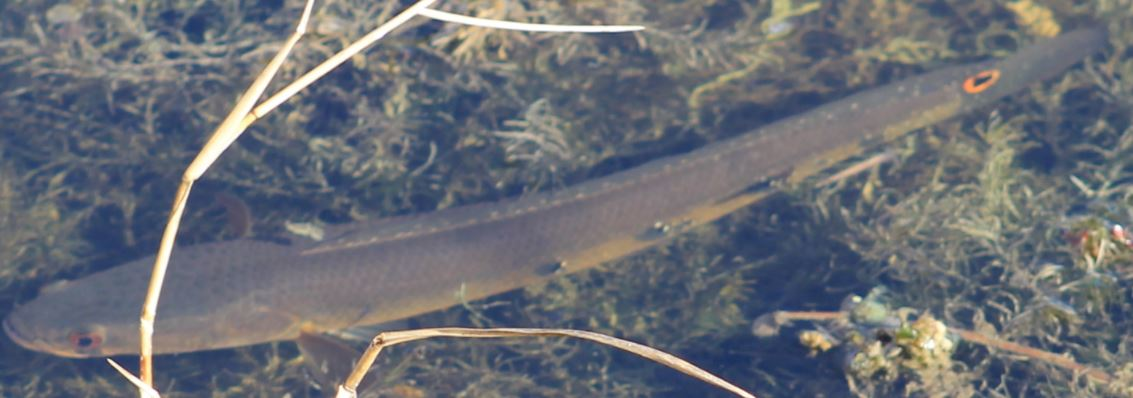
- C. aurolineata in Broward County, FL, US

Scientific classification
- Kingdom: Animalia
- Phylum: Chordata
- Class: Actinopterygii
- Division: Teleostei
- Order: Anabantiformes
- Family: Channidae
- Genus: Channa
- Species: C. aurolineata

Binomial name
- Channa aurolineata F. Day, 1870

= Channa aurolineata =

Species of fish

Channa aurolineata is a species of Asian snakehead in the family Channidae. It is found natively in most of Myanmar's waterways as well as the Mae Khlong drainage in Thailand. There is also an invasive population found in Southeast Florida, United States. This species was recently split from C. marulius, the bullseye snakehead, and confirmed as a separate species in 2018; and the Florida and Thailand populations were not discovered to be C. aurolineata until even more recently in 2019. Before this, the Thailand population's species was unknown and the Florida ones were assumed to be C. marulius. C. aurolineata was able to be separated as a new species and identified in other areas due to slight differences in color pattern, lateral line scale and fin ray morphology, and DNA structure from the other species in the marulius complex.

There is no recorded data on the average lifespan of C. aurolineata. On March 18, 2024, Pata Zoo in Thailand announced that it would permanently retire its C. aurolineata, named Pi-lim (Thai: พี่หลิม, lit. ''Brother Lim''), due to old age, cloudy eyes, and loss of appetite. The zoo had raised him for 20 years.
