= Channa rara =

Conservation status
- Least Concern (IUCN 3.1)

Scientific classification
- Kingdom: Animalia
- Phylum: Chordata
- Class: Actinopterygii
- Order: Anabantiformes
- Family: Channidae
- Genus: Channa
- Species: C. rara

Binomial name
- Channa rara Britz, Dahanukar, Anoop & Ali, 2019

Species of fish

Channa rara is a species of labyrinth fish of the snakehead family (Channidae). It was described in 2019.

== Distribution ==
It is endemic to India. Common in the basin of the Jagbudi River in the state of Maharashtra in the west of the country.

== Description ==
A small fish up to 9 cm long. The body is elongated, cylindrical with a large head. The color is blue-gray with oblique dark vertical stripes. A specific feature from other species of the gahua group is the presence of two spots. There are two black spots at the end of the dorsal fin, and 6-7 stripes on the pectoral fins.

== Lifestyle ==
Occurs in various biotopes (large and medium-sized fast-flowing rivers, streams, lakes, ponds and canals). The soil can also be any. Leads a solitary lifestyle. Lives on the bottom among fallen branches and leaves or among stones (in fast rivers). It feeds on aquatic invertebrates and small fish. Spawning is paired. The male carries the eggs in his mouth. The fry also remain under the care of the male, who takes the babies into his mouth in case of danger or for the night.
