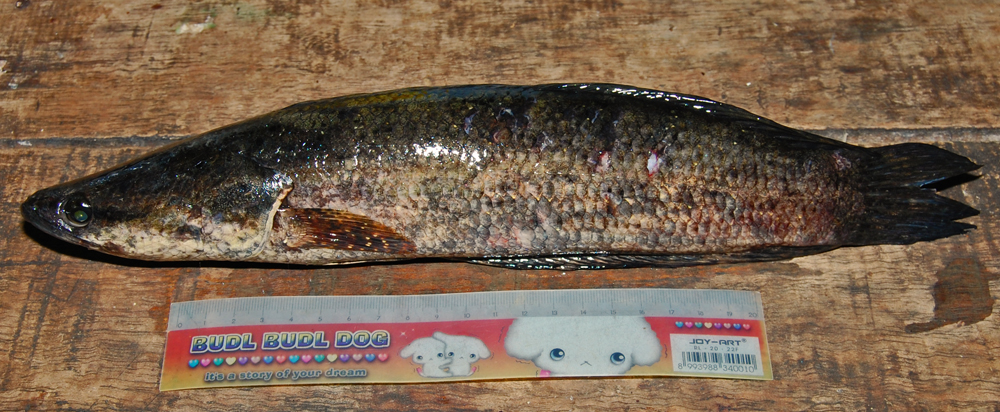
- Channa lucius from Mentaya Hulu, Central Kalimantan

Conservation status
- Least Concern (IUCN 3.1)

Scientific classification
- Kingdom: Animalia
- Phylum: Chordata
- Class: Actinopterygii
- Order: Anabantiformes
- Family: Channidae
- Genus: Channa
- Species: C. lucius

Binomial name
- Channa lucius (G. Cuvier, 1831)

Synonyms
- Ophicephalus lucius Cuvier, 1831; Channa lucia (Cuvier, 1831); Ophicephalus polylepis Bleeker, 1852; Ophiocephalus siamensis Günther, 1861; Channa siamensis (Günther, 1861); Ophicephalus spiritalis Fowler, 1904; Ophiocephalus bistriatus Weber & de Beaufort, 1922

= Forest snakehead =

Species of fish

The forest snakehead (Channa lucius) is a species of snakehead, a fish of the family Channidae. Its range includes most of Southeast Asia and parts of southern China. It lives in forest streams and can reach 40 cm (16 in) in length. The forest snakehead is known in Thai language as pla krasong (Thai: ปลากระสง). Khmer language called it កញ្ជនជៃ (kanh chon chey), Indonesians named it kehung, while in Malaysia, they called it ikan bujuk in Malay Language and in Vietnamese its name is cá lóc dày

A genetic study published in 2017 indicates that C. lucius is a species complex.

== Description ==
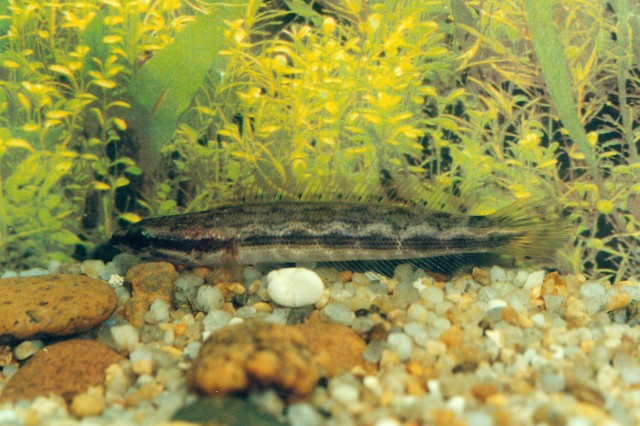
Channa lucius

It has a distinct series of port-hole markings on the side and has a more tapering head compared to other snakeheads. Juveniles are pale and have three lateral stripes from head to tail.
