= Channa harcourtbutleri =

Conservation status
- Near Threatened (IUCN 3.1)

Scientific classification
- Kingdom: Animalia
- Phylum: Chordata
- Class: Actinopterygii
- Order: Anabantiformes
- Family: Channidae
- Genus: Channa
- Species: C. harcourtbutleri

Binomial name
- Channa harcourtbutleri (Annandale, 1918)

Synonyms
- Ophiocephalus harcourt-butleri Annandale, 1918

Species of fish

Channa harcourtbutleri, the Burmese snakehead, is a species of snakehead endemic to Inle Lake and surroundings in Myanmar. Locally called nga ohn-ma, among aquarists it is considered one of the dwarf snakeheads, but no significant import for aquarists is known. It is one of the smaller species of snakehead and has a standard length of up to 19.4 cm (7.6 in). The specific name honors Sir Harcourt Butler, a British governor in the region.

This was for a long time considered to be a junior synonym of Channa gachua. In fact, both species closely resemble each other. The article on its revalidation only mentions three discriminating features, such as the missing ocellus in the dorsal fin of a juvenile Channa harcourtbutleri. It is suspected to be a mouthbrooder and eats a wide range of foods, including arthropods and small fish, but unlike in some relatives, no frogs.
