= Channa quinquefasciata =

Scientific classification
- Kingdom: Animalia
- Phylum: Chordata
- Class: Actinopterygii
- Order: Anabantiformes
- Family: Channidae
- Genus: Channa
- Species: C. quinquefasciata

Binomial name
- Channa quinquefasciata Praveenraj, Uma, Knight, Moulitharan, Balasubramanian, Bineesh & Bleher, 2018

Synonyms
- Channa torsaensis Dey, Nur, Chowdhury, Sarkar, Kosygin & Barat 2019

Species of snakehead

Channa quinquefasciata is a species of snakehead in the family Channidae that was described from North Bengal.
