= Channa aurantipectoralis =

Scientific classification
- Domain: Eukaryota
- Kingdom: Animalia
- Phylum: Chordata
- Class: Actinopterygii
- Order: Anabantiformes
- Family: Channidae
- Genus: Channa
- Species: C. aurantipectoralis

Binomial name
- Channa aurantipectoralis Lalhlimpuia, Lalronunga & Lalramliana, 2016

Species of fish

Channa aurantipectoralis, also known as the orangefinned snakehead, is a species of fish in the Channidae family and is found in the Karnaphuli River in Mizoram, India. The species is an amphibious fish.
