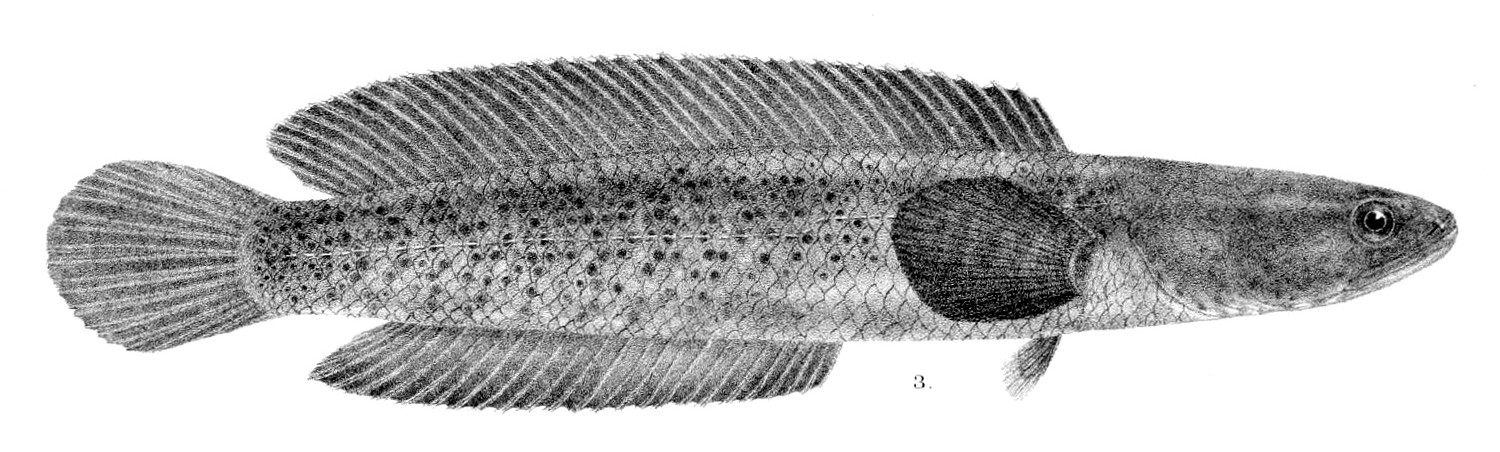

Conservation status
- Least Concern (IUCN 3.1)

Scientific classification
- Kingdom: Animalia
- Phylum: Chordata
- Class: Actinopterygii
- Order: Anabantiformes
- Family: Channidae
- Genus: Channa
- Species: C. stewartii

Binomial name
- Channa stewartii Playfair, 1867

Synonyms
- Ophiocephalus stewartii Playfair, 1867

= Channa stewartii =

Species of fish

Channa stewartii is a species of dwarf snakehead in the family Channidae, which is native to Nepal and the Indian states of Arunachal Pradesh, Assam, Manipur, Meghalaya, Nagaland and Tripura. It may also be found in Bangladesh. This freshwater fish mostly inhabits hill streams, but can also be found in ponds. It is of little value as a food fish but common in the aquarium trade.

It reaches up to 25 cm (10 in) in length.

The specific name honours Major Robert Stewart who was the Superintendent of Cachar in Assam, the type locality. Stewart gave Playfair a collection of specimens of fishes from Cachar, including the type of this one.
