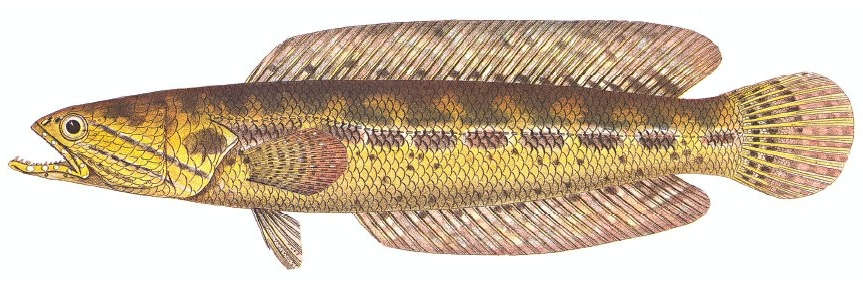
- Channa bankanensis, a fish species

Conservation status
- Near Threatened (IUCN 3.1)

Scientific classification
- Kingdom: Animalia
- Phylum: Chordata
- Class: Actinopterygii
- Order: Anabantiformes
- Family: Channidae
- Genus: Channa
- Species: C. bankanensis

Binomial name
- Channa bankanensis (Bleeker, 1853)

= Channa bankanensis =

Species of fish

Channa bankanensis is a species of fish belonging to the genus Channa. The species lives in both Indonesia and Malaysia with its maximum length of 23.5 cm (9.3 in) long (TL).

== Status ==
In 2019, the IUCN assessed Channa bankanensis and declared the species as Near Threatened under criteria A3c.
