= Channa pseudomarulius =

Scientific classification
- Kingdom: Animalia
- Phylum: Chordata
- Class: Actinopterygii
- Division: Teleostei
- Order: Anabantiformes
- Family: Channidae
- Genus: Channa
- Species: C. pseudomarulius

Binomial name
- Channa pseudomarulius (Günther, 1861)

Species of fish

Channa pseudomarulius is a species of fish in the Channidae family. The species is found in the southern Western Ghats in India. The species has a maximum length of 57.8 centimetres (22.8 in) long (TL) and the published weight of the species is 14 kilograms (31 lb).
