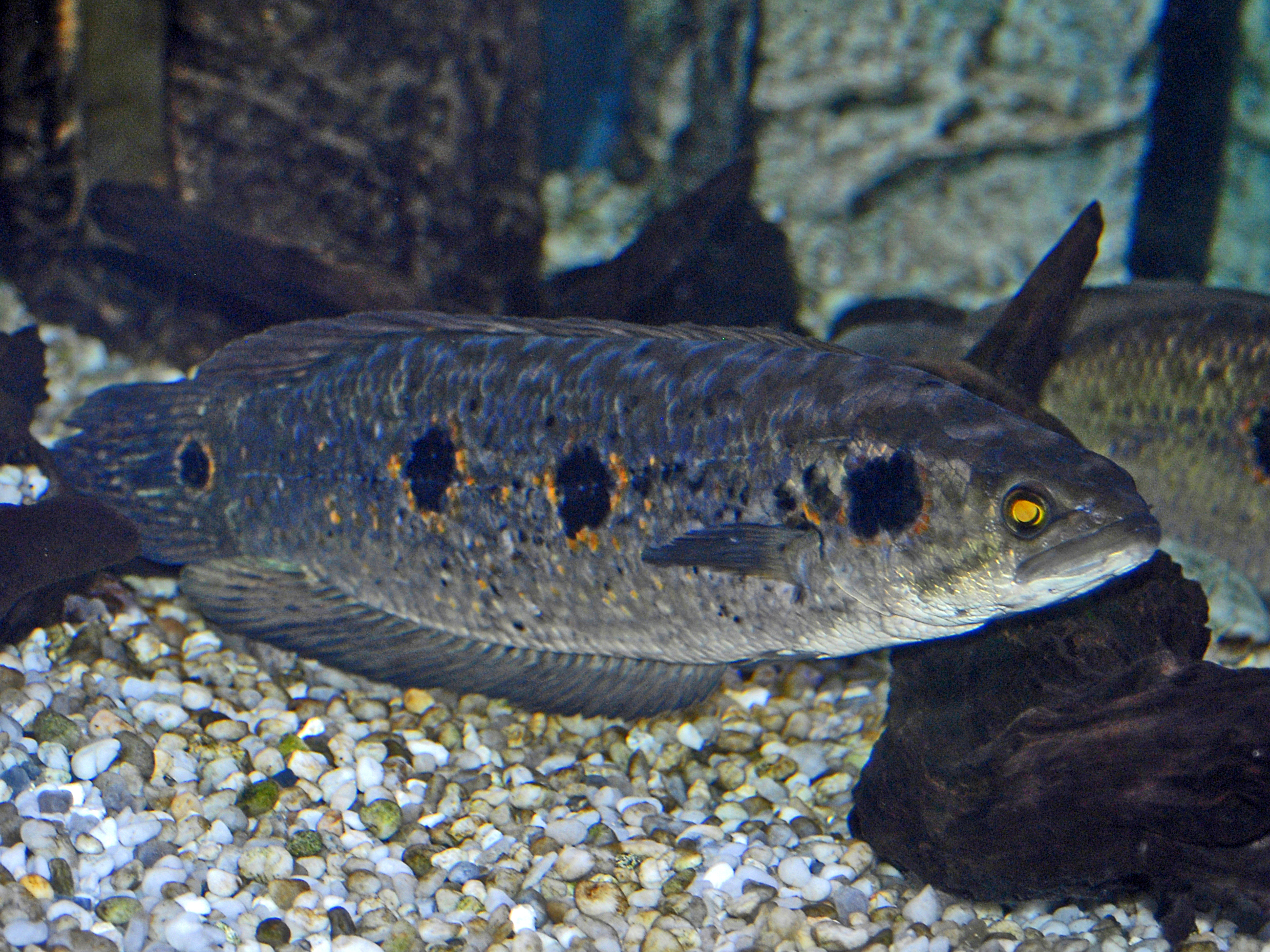

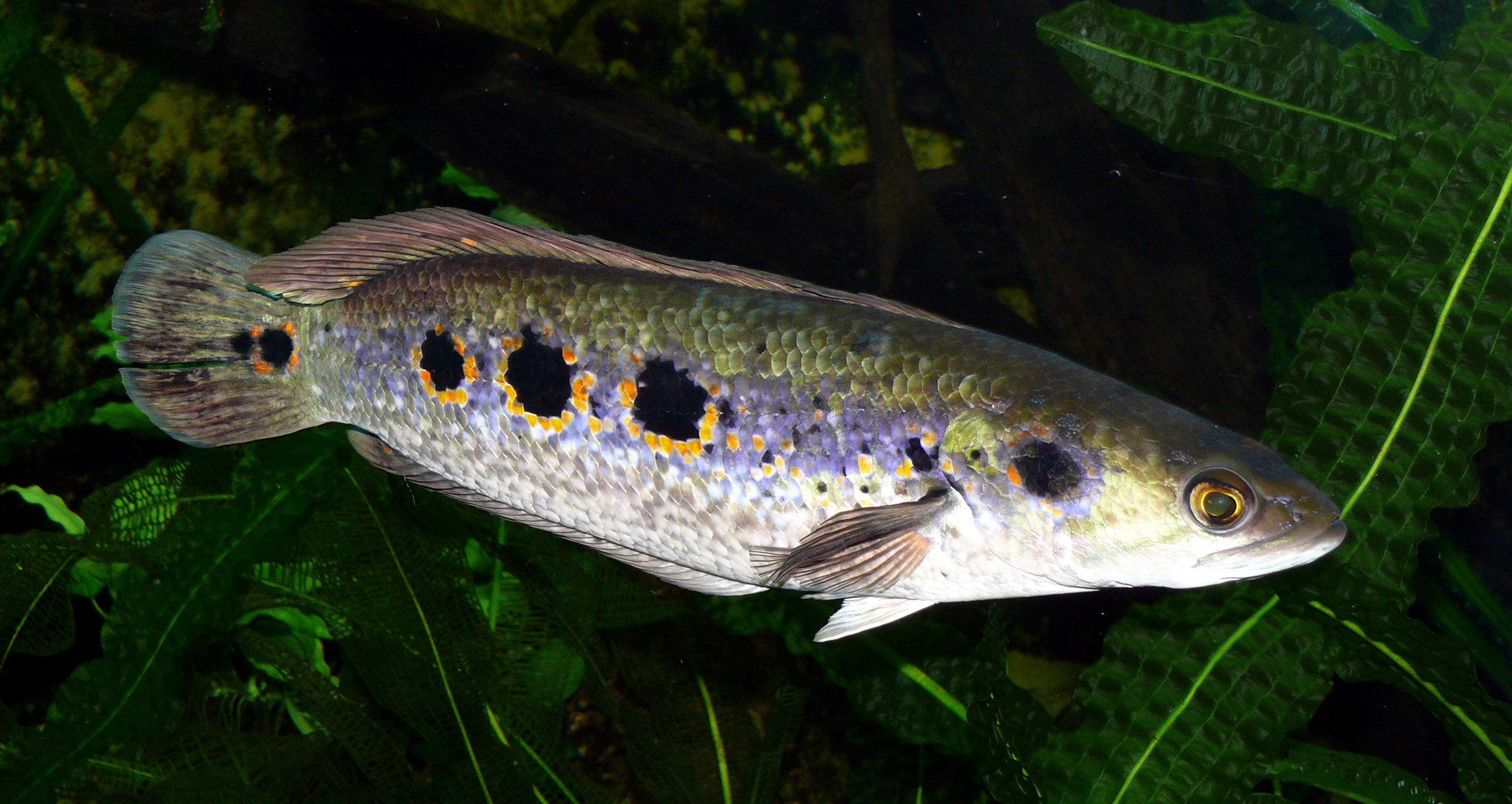

Conservation status
- Near Threatened (IUCN 3.1)

Scientific classification
- Kingdom: Animalia
- Phylum: Chordata
- Class: Actinopterygii
- Order: Anabantiformes
- Family: Channidae
- Genus: Channa
- Species: C. pleurophthalma

Binomial name
- Channa pleurophthalma (Bleeker, 1851)

Synonyms
- Ophiocephalus pleurophthalmus Bleeker, 1851; Ophicephalus urophthalmus Bleeker, 1852; Ophicephalus spiritalis Fowler, 1904

= Channa pleurophthalma =

Species of fish

Channa pleurophthalma, the ocellated snakehead, is a species of freshwater ray-finned fish in the snakehead family Channidae. It is native to Indonesia.

== Etymology ==
Channa pleurophthalma was formally described in 1851 by Pieter Bleeker as Ophiocephalus pleurophthalmus with the type locality given as Bandjarmasin, in Borneo. The specific name is a compound of the Greek terms pleuro- (meaning "side") and ophthalmus (meaning "eye"), a reference to the ocelli on its flanks, opercle and caudal fin.

== Description ==
As other snakehead species, the body of Channa pleurophthalma is cylindrical and laterally flattened. This species has an iridescent greenish or bluish basic color (however, the belly is usually yellowish), and there are three large black ocelli, which are outlined in orange, in the middle of the body. There is an additional ocellus on the opercle and on the caudal fin. The long dorsal fin has 40–43 fin rays, while the soft anal fin has 28–31 rays. This species can reach about 40 cm (16 in).

== Distribution and habitat ==
This species is present in Indonesia, specifically on the islands of Sumatra and Borneo. It prefers areas with black and clear waters.

== Relationship with humans ==
This species is caught for human consumption and for the aquarium trade.

== Bibliography ==
- Nora Brede, Pascal Antler: Art für Art: Schlangenkopffische: Amazonas / Die Gattungen Channa und Parachanna. Natur und Tier-Verlag (2009), ISBN 3-8665-9104-7
- Günther Sterba: Süsswasserfische der Welt. Urania-Verlag, 1990, ISBN 3-332-00109-4
- Walter R. Courtenay & James D. Williams: Snakeheads (Pisces, Channidae) − A Biological Synopsis and Risk Assessment. U.S. Department of the Interior, U.S. Geological Survey Circular 1251, 2004 PDF
