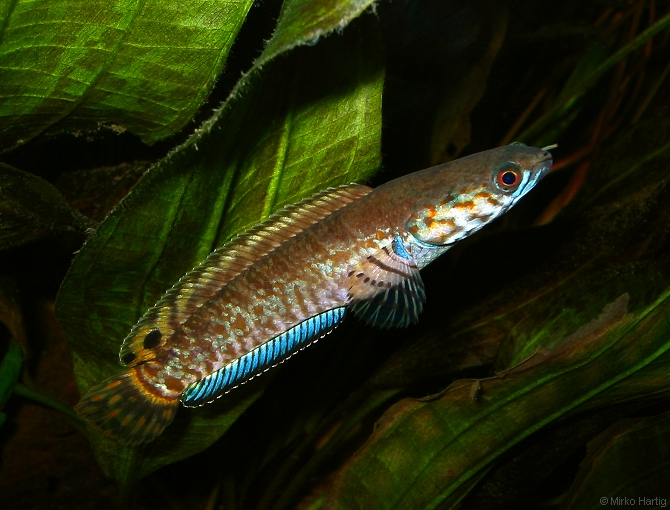

Conservation status
- Near Threatened (IUCN 3.1)

Scientific classification
- Kingdom: Animalia
- Phylum: Chordata
- Class: Actinopterygii
- Order: Anabantiformes
- Family: Channidae
- Genus: Channa
- Species: C. bleheri

Binomial name
- Channa bleheri Vierke, 1991

= Channa bleheri =

Species of fish

Channa bleheri (the rainbow snakehead) is a species of dwarf snakehead that is endemic to the Brahmaputra River basin in the Indian states of Assam and Arunachal Pradesh. It is among the most colorful species of snakehead.

== Distribution and etymology ==
In the wild, this species primarily inhabits waters within the Indian state of Assam, and it is known in Assamese as sengeli or chengeli. Its binomial name honors the explorer Heiko Bleher. The specific name of this fish honours the explorer and exotic fish trader Heiko Bleher who assisted in the collection of the type and gave it to Vierke.

Endemic to the Brahmaputra River basin, this fish has a type location at Dibrugarh, a city in the northeastern part of Assam. Its closest relative appears to be Channa burmanica, which is endemic to northern Burma.

== Appearance and aquarium popularity ==
This species is one of the favorite snakeheads for aquariums because of the colors that inspired its common name. Juveniles that have reached one centimetre (0.4 in) have yellow bodies, and adults have large orange or red spots.

This fish grows to 17 cm (6.7 in) in standard length and is a part of the group known informally as dwarf snakeheads.

== Reproduction and movement ==
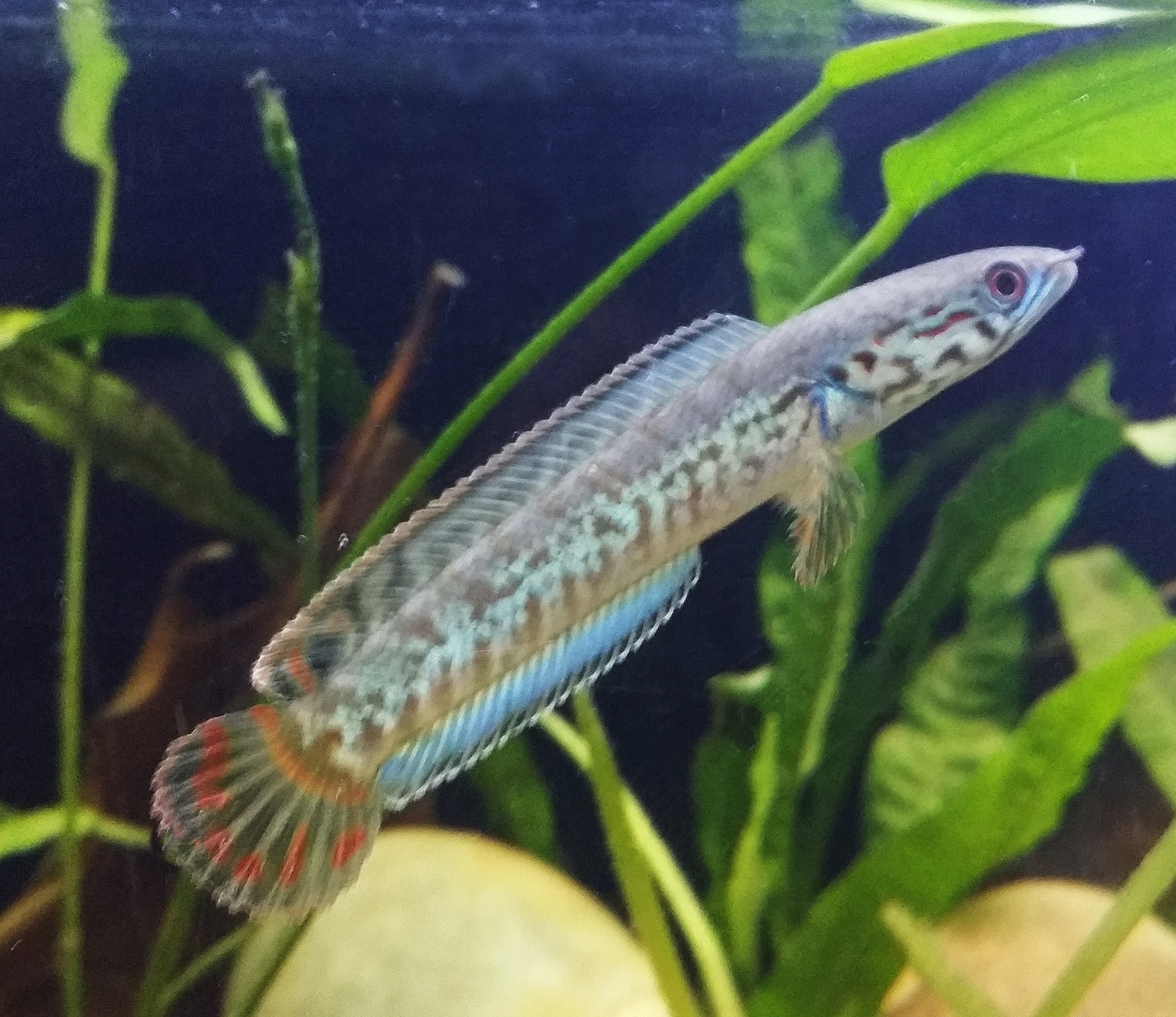
A juvenile Channa bleheri in aquarium

Among dwarf snakeheads, it is the only nestbrooder; all others are mouthbrooders. Females, which are smaller than males, appear to initiate courtship, although the male selects the nesting site, and both parents will guard the larvae.

The adult male and female move near the surface for sex. These fish are benthopelagic, meaning that they mostly dwell near the bottom of bodies of water.

== Environmental and legal issues ==
The federal government in the U.S. is concerned that release of this fish into U.S. waters could harm the environment. This predator could kill native species, especially in southern areas such as Florida, Texas, and Hawaii that have a warm climate similar to Assam's climate.

Accordingly, it is illegal in the United States to possess, import, or sell these fish or their eggs. Violations of this law have occurred in various states (e.g. Kentucky and Georgia).
