= Channa stiktos =

Scientific classification
- Domain: Eukaryota
- Kingdom: Animalia
- Phylum: Chordata
- Class: Actinopterygii
- Order: Anabantiformes
- Family: Channidae
- Genus: Channa
- Species: C. stiktos

Binomial name
- Channa stiktos Lalramliana, Knight, Lalhlimpuia & Singh, 2018

Species of fish

Channa stiktos is a species of fish belonging to the Channa genus. The species maximum length is 18.8 cm (7.4 in) long (SL).

== Etymology ==
The species epithet stiktos is a Greek word meaning "spotted", referring to the multiple spots presented on the species' body.
