= Channa ornatipinnis =

Conservation status
- Data Deficient (IUCN 3.1)

Scientific classification
- Kingdom: Animalia
- Phylum: Chordata
- Class: Actinopterygii
- Order: Anabantiformes
- Family: Channidae
- Genus: Channa
- Species: C. ornatipinnis

Binomial name
- Channa ornatipinnis Britz, 2008

Species of fish

Channa ornatipinnis is a freshwater species of snakehead, a fish of the family Channidae. It is found in tropical Asia. They can get up to 30.5 cm (12.0 in) long.
