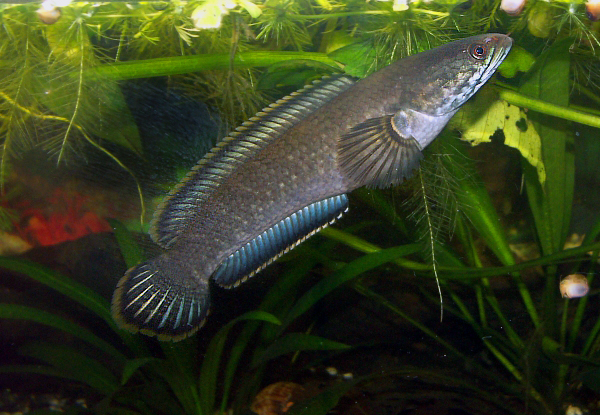

Conservation status
- Least Concern (IUCN 3.1)

Scientific classification
- Kingdom: Animalia
- Phylum: Chordata
- Class: Actinopterygii
- Order: Anabantiformes
- Family: Channidae
- Genus: Channa
- Species: C. gachua

Binomial name
- Channa gachua (F. Hamilton, 1822)
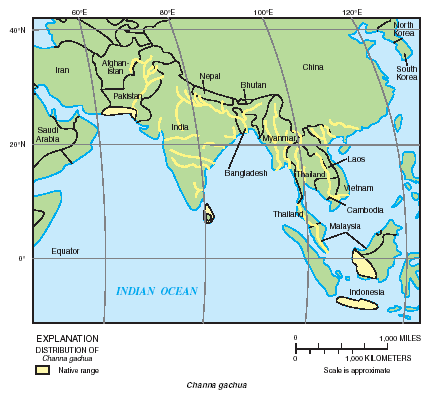
- Range map

Synonyms
- Ophicephalus gachua Hamilton, 1822; Ophiocephalus aurantiacus Hamilton, 1822; Ophicephalus marginatus Cuvier, 1829; Ophicephalus limbatus Cuvier, 1831; Ophicephalus apus Canestrini, 1861

= Channa gachua =

Species of fish

Channa gachua, the dwarf snakehead, is a species of fish in the family Channidae. The name "dwarf snakehead" is also used for several other species of small snakeheads. C. gachua is native to freshwater habitats in southern Asia, where it has a wide distribution from Iran to Indonesia. This fish is considered to be a species complex, a group of several closely related taxa with one name. It is likely at least three to four different species, and further research may differentiate them. A few species such as Channa harcourtbutleri have been separated from the complex in recent decades. The easternmost population of C. gachua is often recognized as a separate species C. limbata, while the isolated Sri Lankan population often is recognized as C. kelaartii.

== Description ==
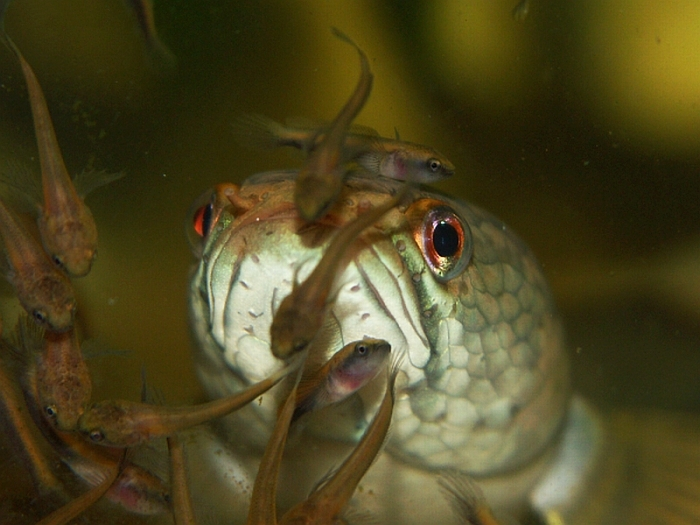
C. gachua with fry

This species can reach 28 cm (11 in) in total length, but most individuals are much smaller. It feeds on small fish, insects, and crustaceans. It is a mouthbrooder, with the male brooding the eggs and juveniles in his mouth. Males have more-extended dorsal and anal fins than females, and develop more intense color pattern.

== Distribution and taxonomy ==
The species was recorded from Iran, Afghanistan, Pakistan, Nepal, India, Sri Lanka, Bangladesh, Bhutan, China, Myanmar, Thailand, Laos, Cambodia, Viet Nam, Malaysia, Indonesia, and Singapore. This is a common fish found in most any type of wetland. It can live in large rivers or small brooks and creeks, in fast currents or stagnant waters, and in altered waterways such as canals. It also lives in rice paddies.

There is a distinct genetic split between western and eastern populations (the distribution of the two approach each other in Myanmar). As a consequence some recognize them as separate species with western being C. gachua and eastern C. limbata. The isolated Sri Lankan population is also highly distinctive from a genetic point of view, leading some to recognize it as C. kelaartii. Despite the deep genetic splits between these populations, their morphology is very similar.

== Value ==
This fish is caught for food in many parts of Asia. This is one of several Channa known as dwarf snakeheads, smaller species kept in aquaria. It is also valued for its attractive coloration. This species has been studied for use in aquaculture operations.
