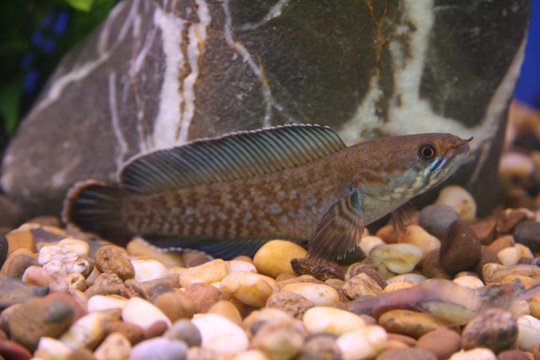

Scientific classification
- Kingdom: Animalia
- Phylum: Chordata
- Class: Actinopterygii
- Order: Anabantiformes
- Family: Channidae
- Genus: Channa
- Species: C. andrao

Binomial name
- Channa andrao Britz, 2013

= Channa andrao =

Species of fish

Channa andrao is a species of snakehead, a fish of the family Channidae. Its range includes India in Asia. It is described in 2013 by Ralf Britz. The species name honours Andrew Rao. This species is found in the aquarium trade.
