= Parachanna fayumensis =

Parachanna fayumensis Temporal range: Eocene, 35–33 Ma

Scientific classification
- Domain: Eukaryota
- Kingdom: Animalia
- Phylum: Chordata
- Class: Actinopterygii
- Order: Anabantiformes
- Family: Channidae
- Genus: Parachanna
- Species: †P. fayumensis

Binomial name
- †Parachanna fayumensis Murray, 2006

Extinct species of fish

Parachanna fayumensis, is an extinct member of the snakehead fish family (Channidae) known from fossil records only. It is the oldest member of this family known from Africa. It differs from Parachanna insignis, P. africana and P. obscura by presence of prominent raised tooth patch with well-developed tooth sockets on a ventral surface of parasphenoid posterior end. Several skull bones were found in the upper Eocene and lower Oligocene Jebel Qatrani Formation of the Fayum Depression, Egypt. The zoogeographic importance of this fossil material is that it suggests a Channid migration from India to Africa long before the Miocene.
