= Snakehead =

Snakehead(s) may refer to:

== Arts and entertainment ==
- Snakehead (band), now Be.A, a South Korean boy band
- Snakehead (film), a 2021 American crime drama film
- "Snakehead" (Fringe), a 2009 television episode
- Snakehead (novel), a 2007 Alex Rider novel by Anthony Horowitz
- Snakeheads (film), or Stowaway, a 2001 Hong Kong action film

== Other uses ==
- Snakehead (fish), freshwater fish in the family Channidae
- Snakehead (gang), a type of Chinese gang involved in people smuggling

== See also ==
- Channoidei, a suborder of freshwater fish that includes Channidae
  - Aenigmachanna, or dragon snakeheads, a genus of freshwater fish in the suborder
