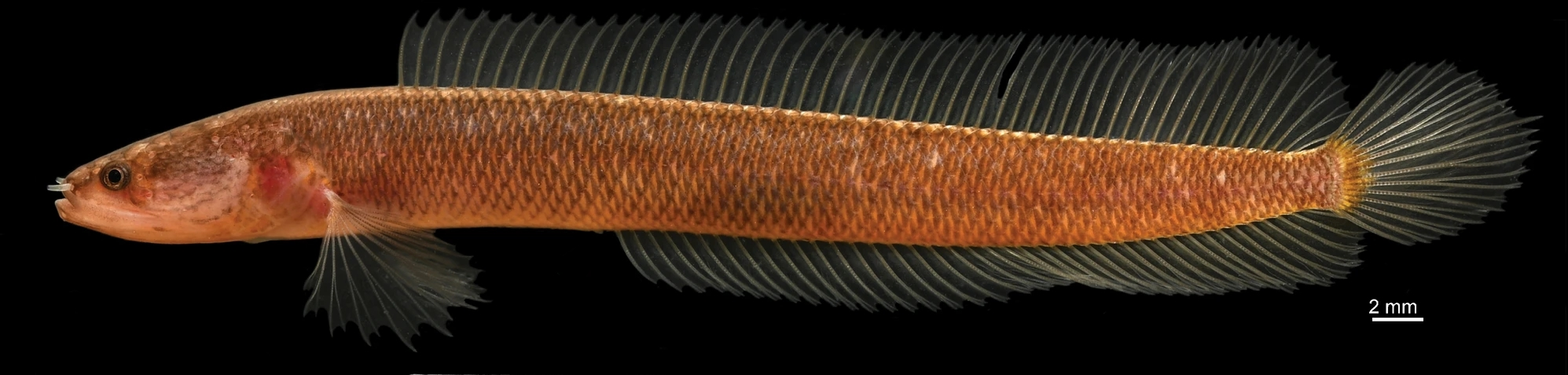

Conservation status
- Vulnerable (IUCN 3.1)

Scientific classification
- Kingdom: Animalia
- Phylum: Chordata
- Class: Actinopterygii
- Division: Teleostei
- Order: Anabantiformes
- Family: Aenigmachannidae
- Genus: Aenigmachanna
- Species: A. gollum

Binomial name
- Aenigmachanna gollum Britz, Anoop, Dahanukar and Raghavan, 2019
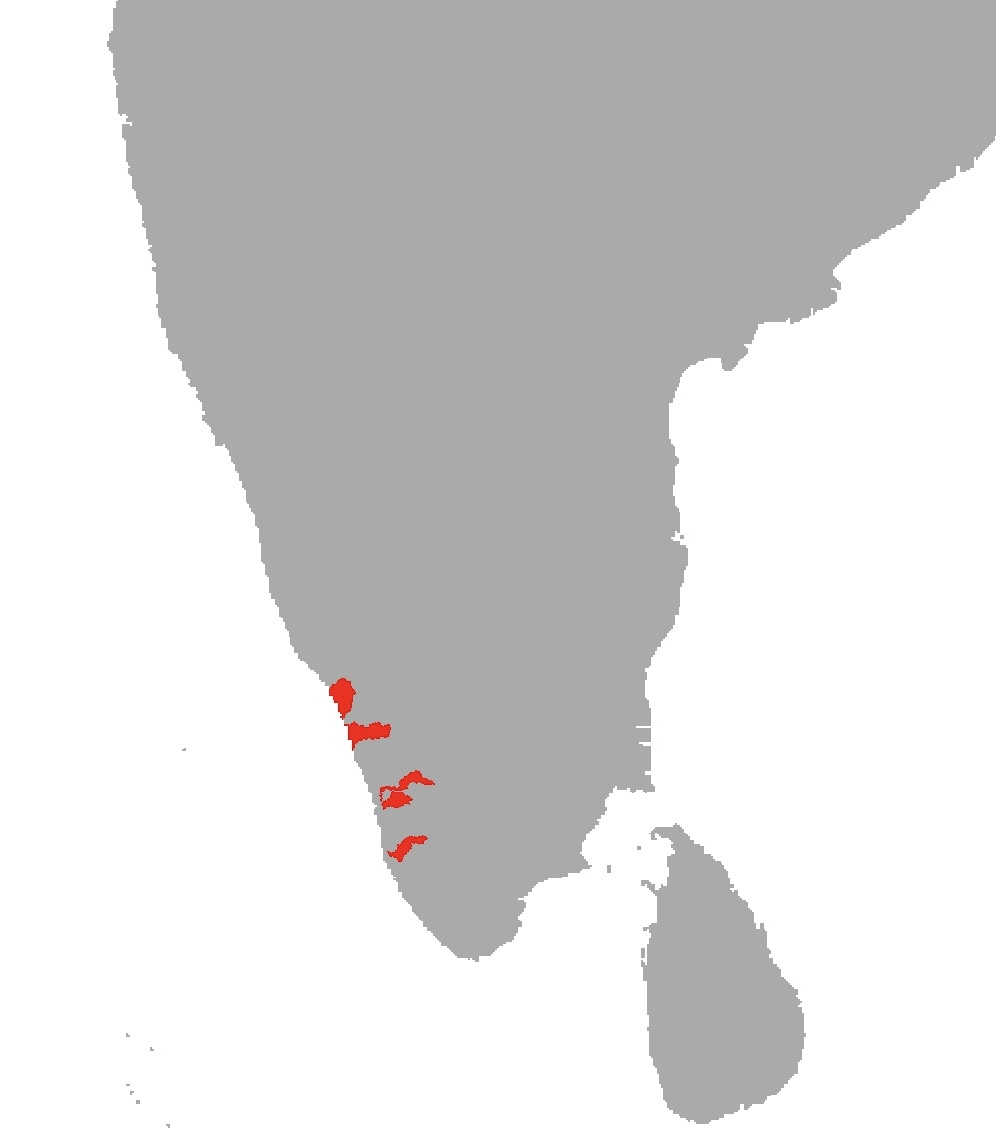
- Range of Aenigmachanna gollum

= Aenigmachanna gollum =

Subterranean species of snakehead fish endemic to Kerala, India

The Gollum snakehead, Aenigmachanna gollum, is the first subterranean "dragon snakehead" fish of the family Aenigmachannidae, endemic to the state of Kerala in southwestern India.

== Description ==
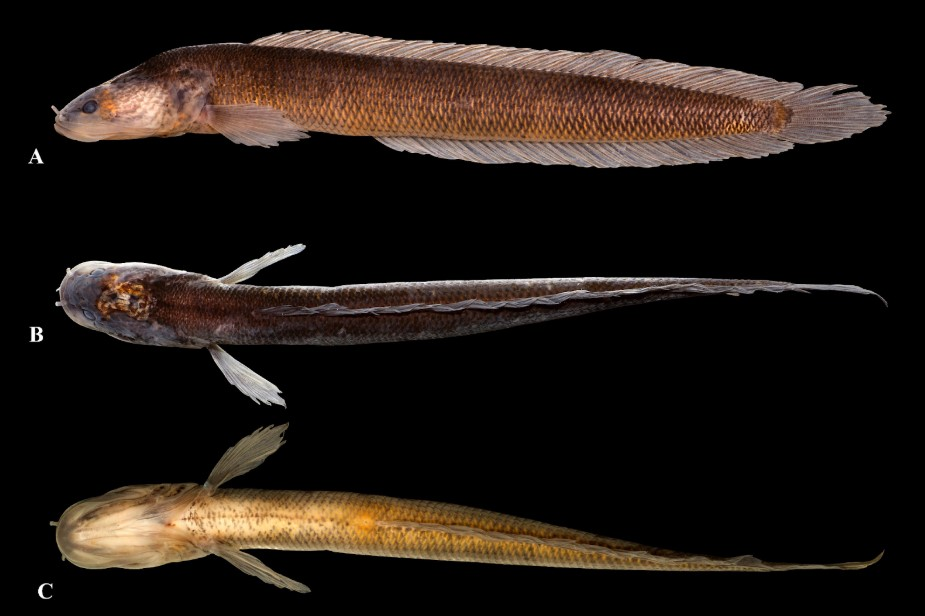
Anatomical views of Aenigmachanna gollum: (A) lateral view highlighting elongated body and long dorsal fin, (B) dorsal view showing fin placement and scale pattern, and (C) ventral view showing reduced pelvic region.

Aenigmachanna gollum has an elongated, slender body that is anteriorly cylindrical and becomes laterally compressed caudally. It is often described as an eel-like fish with a large head and mouth, where the jaw takes up nearly two-thirds of the total head length. Several rows of recurved teeth line the premaxilla and dentary bones, while only a single row is present on the palatine bone. The dorsal fin is long, beginning just behind the gill region and ending before the caudal base. The anal fin starts roughly halfway along the body and also terminates at the caudal base. The pectoral fins are rounded and oval-shaped, aiding in stabilization during slow, sinuous swimming. The caudal fin is truncated with a rounded margin. A. gollum lacks pelvic fins entirely.

Unlike many stygofauna – which usually have reduced colouring and have poor or no vision – A. gollum has well-developed pigmentation and normally-sized eyes. The body of Aenigmachanna gollum varies in coloration from shades of brown to light beige.

Due to its reduced swim bladder, Aenigmachanna gollum cannot maintain buoyancy in the water. Like other snakeheads (Aenigmachanna and Channidae), it is capable of air breathing and moves by undulating its spineless fins in an eel-like manner.

== Distribution and habitat ==
A. gollum is known only from its type locality, a paddy field in Oorakam, Kerala, in the biodiverse Western Ghats; one other occurrence was reported in a well 250 km south of the type locality. Its habitat in subterranean aquifers is threatened by an estimated six million groundwater wells in the region, which lower the water table.

The aquifers that Aenigmachanna gollum occupies maintain a temperature range of 28–30 °C and are surrounded by laterite, a rock high in iron and aluminium. The other species in the family, A. mahabali, is also endemic to southwestern peninsular India. Despite occurring in a relatively human-dominated landscape, both species remained scientifically undiscovered until September 2018. This is most likely due to aquifers being virtually inaccessible to humans.

== Biology ==
Due to its recent discovery and difficult-to-access habitat, much of Aenigmachanna gollum's biology and life history remains unknown. It maintains a cave-dwelling lifestyle and is adapted to dark, low-oxygen conditions. Like other members of the Channidae family, it is predatory. The presence of recurved teeth suggests that it can prey on small invertebrates such as insects and crustaceans.

Reproductive behavior remains unknown in Aenigmachanna gollum, as no spawning events or mature specimens have been observed. The lack of pelvic fins in A. gollum suggests that it may have a different breeding strategy than surface-dwelling snakeheads, which use their pelvic fins to maintain stability during spawning.

Aenigmachanna gollum demonstrates partial troglomorphism and is fully adapted to subterranean life. Unlike true snakeheads in the genus Channa, A. gollum lacks the suprabranchial air-breathing organ that enables aerial respiration; instead, it relies entirely on aquatic respiration. Its slender body shape allows it to maneuver easily through rocky crevices. It retains both eyes and pigmentation, features that many stygofaunal species lose in darkness, and the reason for this retention remains unknown.

== Taxonomy ==
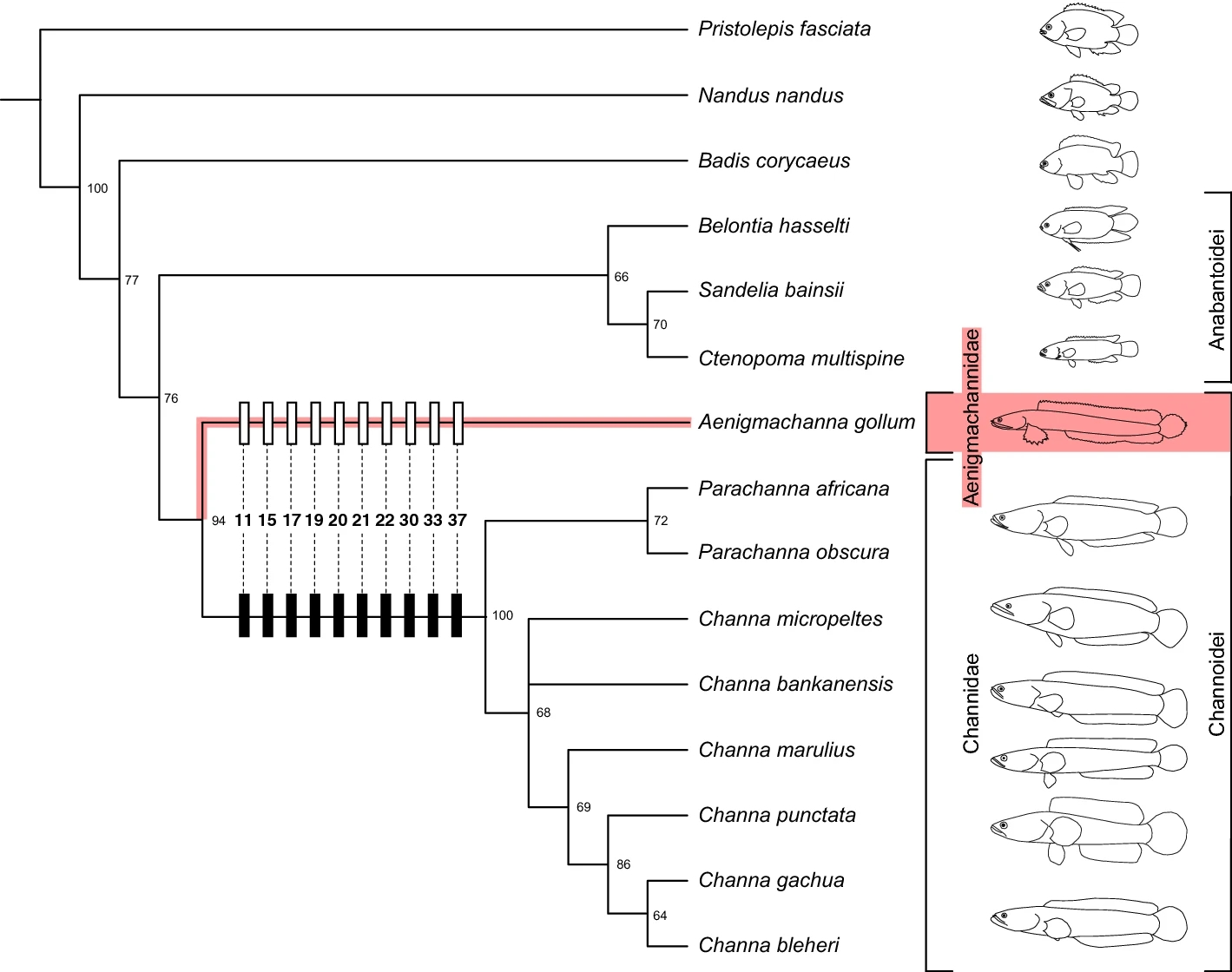
Cladogram depicting A. gollum's relationship with other channids

A. gollum was the first discovered species of the genus Aenigmachanna. It was first scientifically described as a species in 2019. However, a specimen collected in 1993 was misidentified as Channa orientalis.

The genus was first placed in the true snakehead fish family Channidae. Although it closely resembles species in the family Channidae, it has several differences that make it taxonomically different, and was therefore placed in the newly-created family Aenigmachannidae.

Species in Channidae live in surface freshwater habitats and have a well-developed, large swim bladder to control their buoyancy as they navigate different water levels. Channidae species also have suprabranchial organs that allow them to breathe aerially. The Aenigmachannidae lineage is thought to have diverged from other snakeheads around 34–109 million years ago. Aenigmachannidae is sister to all other modern snakeheads, is often referred to as a "living fossil", and retains several ancestral traits that have been lost in Channidae. Members of Aenigmachannidae lack the specialized suprabranchial air-breathing organ found in Channidae and rely solely on aquatic respiration. They also have a reduced swim bladder, a higher number of vertebrae, and lack the clear abdominal–caudal vertebral separation that is considered a synapomorphy of Channidae.

Mitogenome analysis has been performed on several fish species in the Channidae family. This has shown that between northern and southern Asian lineages, a possible genetic divergence lies in circular mitochondrial genomes. A complete mitogenome analysis has not been performed for the Aenigmachannidae family but due to being a sister group of the Channidae family, a similar mitogenome structure is possible.

Currently, there are only two species placed into the Aenigmachannidae family: A. gollum and A. mahabali. A. mahabali can be distinguished from A. gollum by possessing fewer dorsal fin rays, vertebrae, lateral line scales, and pectoral fin rays. These two species both occupy the south-western peninsula of India and were discovered in similar ways. A. mahabali is described as a troglophile. It is also a subterranean species but can possibly access the surface through wells. A. gollum is strictly found within aquifers beneath rice paddy fields.

== Conservation and potential human use ==
A. gollum is classified as Vulnerable under the IUCN Red List criteria (IUCN 3.1). The IUCN Red List provides a global inventory of species' extinction risk and evaluates threats based on standardized criteria. The "IUCN 3.1" designation refers to version 3.1 of the IUCN Red List Categories and Criteria, a globally standardized framework used to evaluate extinction risk based on current research. Although its true conservation status requires more extensive research, its restricted range and subterranean habitat in wells and aquifers suggest a high conservation concern. A. gollum may face habitat loss caused by groundwater extraction and pollution.

There are no documented cases of A. gollum being used recreationally by humans. Its subterranean habitat makes it inaccessible to farmers and poachers.

== Etymology ==
A. gollum is named after the cave-dwelling character Gollum from J. R. R. Tolkien's The Hobbit and The Lord of the Rings book series, as a reference to both A. gollum and Gollum being former surface-dwellers that evolved to adapt to the caves they lived in. The genus Aenigmachanna was raised for the first time on discovery of A. gollum, with aenigma meaning "enigma" in Latin, and Channa being the generic name of Asian snakehead fishes.

== See also ==
- Gollum (shark), another taxon of fish named after Gollum
