= Aenigmachanna mahabali =

Scientific classification
- Kingdom: Animalia
- Phylum: Chordata
- Class: Actinopterygii
- Order: Anabantiformes
- Family: Aenigmachannidae
- Genus: Aenigmachanna
- Species: A. mahabali

Binomial name
- Aenigmachanna mahabali Kumar, Basheer, and Ravi, 2019
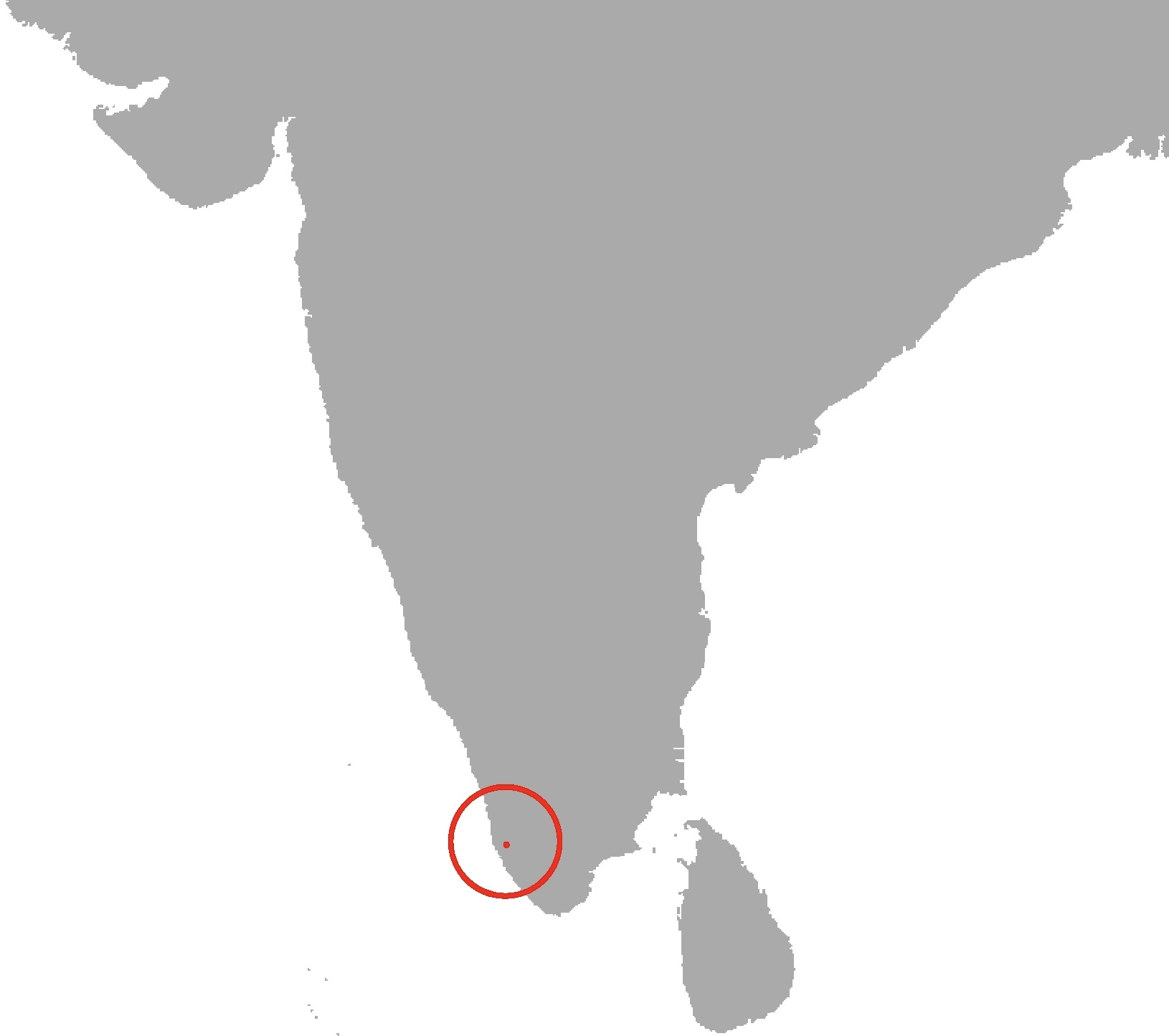

Species of fish

Aenigmachanna mahabali, the Mahabali snakehead, is a species of troglophilic snakehead fish that is endemic to the Indian state of Kerala.The fish is named after Mahabali, an asura king from Hindu mythology who lived underground and is associated with Onam. It is known from a single specimen recovered from a well over 200 kilometers south of the locality where its closest relative, A. gollum, was found. Alongside A. gollum, it is unique for being the only known cave-dwelling snakehead fish. It can be distinguished from A. gollum due to having fewer dorsal fin rays, vertebrae, and lateral scales, as well as its pectoral fin rays extending beyond the margin of the membrane, forming filaments.
