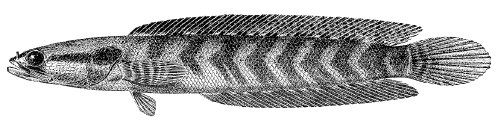
- Parachanna africana, after Boulenger, 1916

Conservation status
- Least Concern (IUCN 3.1)

Scientific classification
- Kingdom: Animalia
- Phylum: Chordata
- Class: Actinopterygii
- Order: Anabantiformes
- Family: Channidae
- Genus: Parachanna
- Species: P. africana

Binomial name
- Parachanna africana (Steindachner, 1879)
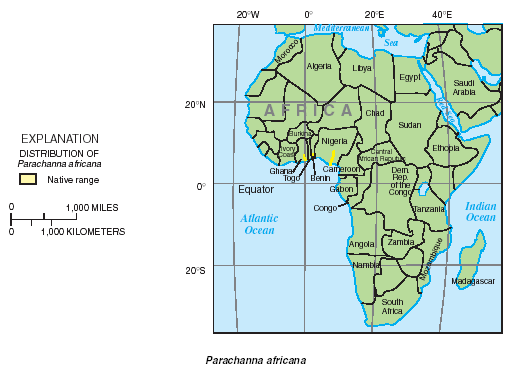
- Distribution of Parachanna africana.

Synonyms
- Ophiocephalus africanus Steindachner, 1879; Channa africana (Steindachner, 1879); Parophiocephalus africanus (Steindachner, 1879)

= Parachanna africana =

Species of fish

Parachanna africana, the African snakehead or Niger snakehead, is a species of fish from west-central Africa. Little is published on its biology. Limited primarily to coastal sections of rivers, it is thought to be a nest-building, thrust predator like other Channidae.

Its native range is southern Benin to southern Nigeria, primarily the Oueme River and the basin of the Niger River. In Nigeria, it is used for human consumption and used in medicine.

== Description ==
Diagnosis: The body of the species is elongated, tapering backwards; lateral line scale medium-sized, head depressed anteriorly and covered with larger scales. Lower jaw slightly longer than upper, with 3–4 well developed canines; dorsal fin with 45–48, 8–11 Chevron-shaped dark bars onside.

Coloration: The body color is light to dark grey, back and top of the head darker, underside lighter, dark lateral band on head, broadening between hind margin of the eye and hind margin of Gill cover, followed by a large, rounded black spot; small rounded black spot at the caudal fin.

This species is sometimes mistaken for its congener P. obscura, but following Bonou and Teugal (1985), P. Africana can be distinguished from P. obscura by the following combination of characteristics since sometimes they are misapplied:

- Colour pattern is unique – Parachanna africana has a series of 8–11 dark chevron-shaped markings extending along the body posterior to the operculum
- 19–24 scales in the transverse series
- Lateral line complete with 73–83 pores scales
- 32–35 anal-fin rays.

Most times, the chevron marking may not be visible in a live specimen; this depends on the mood of the fish.

== Habitat ==
P.africana are freshwater species; Benthopelagic species. They primarily inhabit lowlands, coastal river basins, swamps, lakes, and man-made reservoirs.

== Diet ==
P.africana is an ambush predator that feeds on smaller fishes and invertebrates in nature but in most cases adapts well to dead alternatives in Captivity. Some specimen accepts dried food though these should never form the stable diet.

Young fish can be fed with chironomid larvae (blood worm), small earthworms, chopped prawns and suchlike while adults will accept strips of fish flesh, whole prawns, mussels, live river shrimps, larger earthworms etc.

Older individuals do not require feeding on daily basis, with 2–3 times per week sufficient.

Note that, this species should not be fed mammalian or avian mean for example beef heart or chicken since some of the lipids contained in these cannot be properly metabolised by the fish and may cause excess fat deposits and even organ degeneration.

== Sexual dimorphism ==
Adult males are slightly slimmer and smaller than females, they possess a longer, narrower head shape, and slightly extended unpaired fins.

== Reproduction ==
P.africana lay their eggs among floating vegetation or floating plants where they float at the surface and are guarded by the male. Nuptial individuals darken considerably and turn to appear blackish with the peak of reproductive activity during the wet season.

== Aquaria ==
This species is uncommon in the aquarium trade. It prefers a dimly-lit aquarium with a layer of surface vegetation such as Ceratopteris spp plus some submerged cover.

It is essential to use a tightly – fitting hood since Parachanna, like all snakeheads, are notorious for their ability to jump and escape. A gap should be left between this and the water surface as they require access to a layer of humid air to breathe.

■The water condition should have a temperature of about 20–25-degree Celsius, A pH of 5•0–7•5 and the hardness of the water should be 36 – 268ppm
