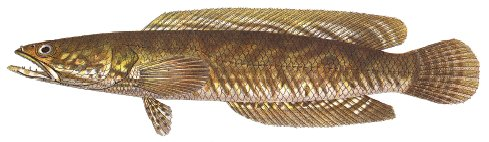
- Channa striata, after Bleeker, 1879
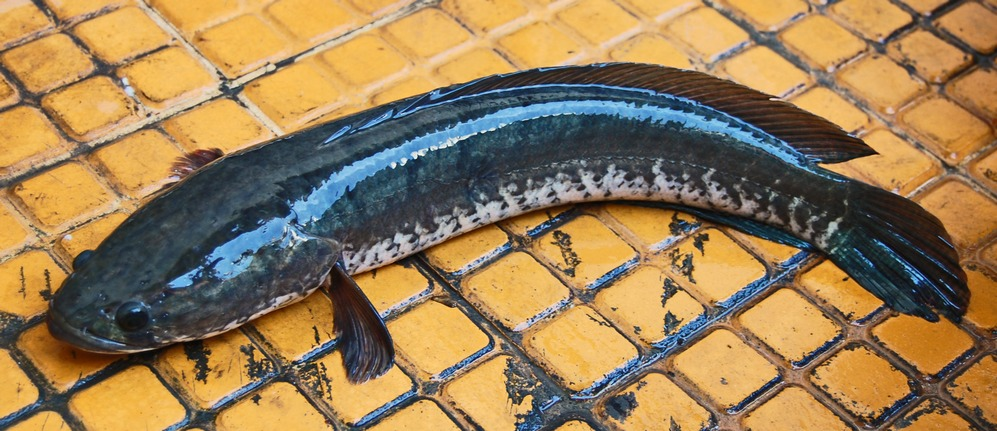

Conservation status
- Least Concern (IUCN 3.1)

Scientific classification
- Kingdom: Animalia
- Phylum: Chordata
- Class: Actinopterygii
- Division: Teleostei
- Order: Anabantiformes
- Family: Channidae
- Genus: Channa
- Species: C. striata

Binomial name
- Channa striata (Bloch, 1793)
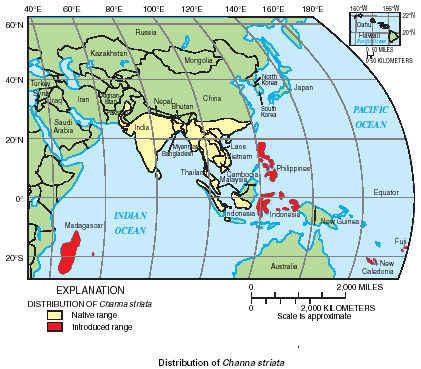
- Distribution of Channa striata. Madagascar reports are misidentifications of C. maculata

Synonyms
- Ophicephalus striatus Bloch, 1793; Channa stiata (Bloch, 1793); Ophiocephalus wrahl Lacépède, 1801; Ophiocephalus chena Hamilton, 1822; Ophicephalus planiceps Cuvier, 1831; Ophiocephalus vagus Peters, 1868; Ophiocephalus philippinus Peters, 1868

= Channa striata =

Species of fish

Capture (blue) and aquaculture (green) production of Striped snakehead (Channa striata) in thousand tonnes from 1950 to 2022, as reported by the FAO

Channa striata, the striped snakehead, is a species of snakehead fish. It is also known as the common snakehead, chevron snakehead, or snakehead murrel and generally referred simply as mudfish. It is native to South and Southeast Asia, and has been introduced to some Pacific Islands. Reports from Madagascar and Hawaii are misidentifications of C. maculata.

A genetic study published in 2017 indicates that C. striata is a species complex.

== Description ==
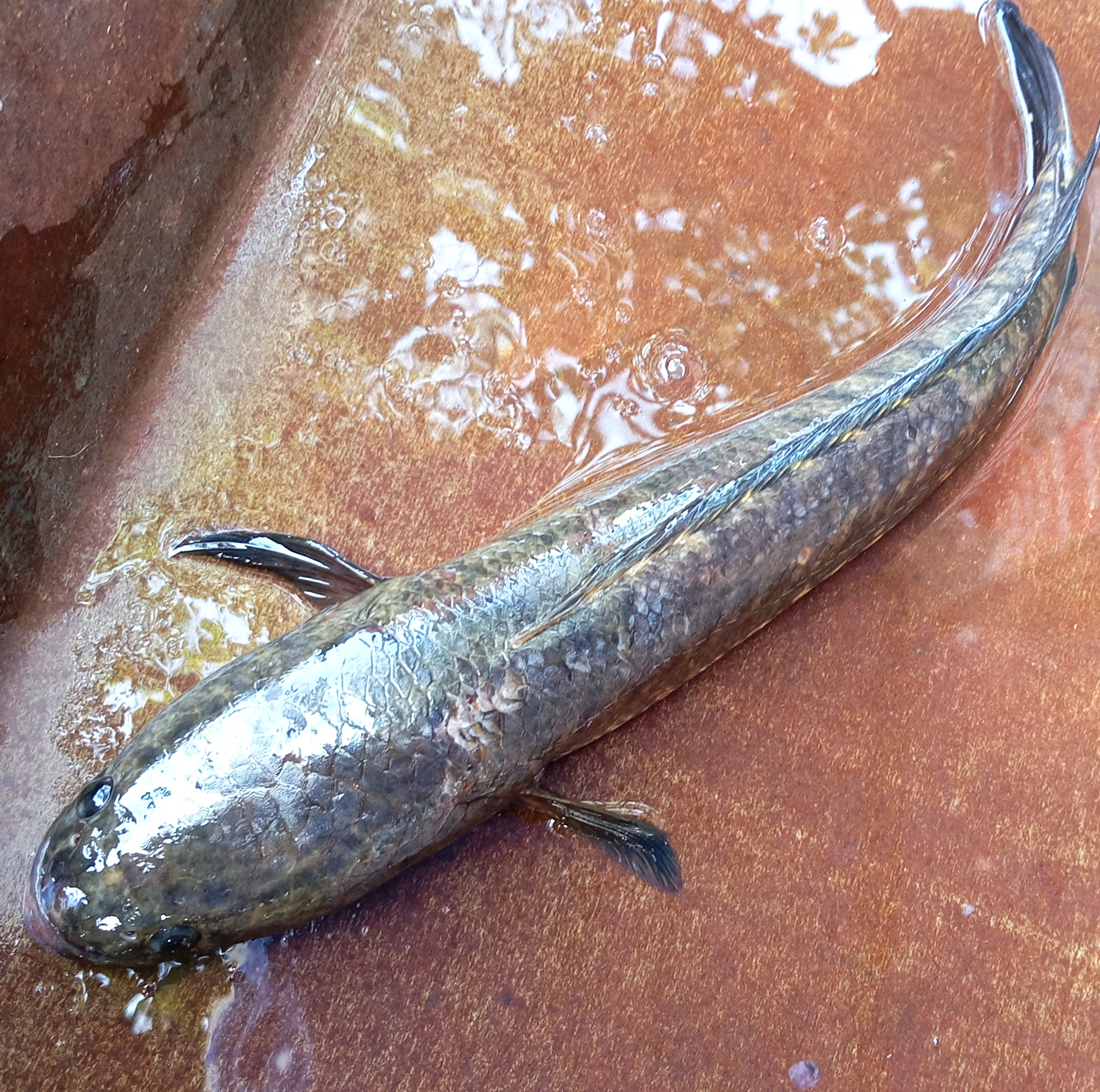
Snakehead murrel, West Bengal, India

It is a bony fish with endoskeleton ribcage, grows up to a meter in length, though because of fishing, this size is rarely found in the wild. It has a widespread range covering southern China, Pakistan, most of India, southern Nepal, Bangladesh, Sri Lanka, and most of Southeast Asia. It has more recently been introduced to the outermost parts of Indonesia, the Philippines, and Mauritius. Reports beginning in the early 20th century that it was introduced into the wild in Hawaii, particularly the island of Oahu, as well as later reports from Madagascar, are the result of misidentifications of C. maculata. The only currently confirmed Hawaiian establishment of C. striata is on a commercial fish farm. Popular media and the United States Fish and Wildlife Service were perpetuating this apparent mistake as recently as 2002. Early- to mid-20th century reports and texts referring to its introduction in California appear to be the result of a misunderstanding.

It is an important food fish in its entire native range, and is of considerable economic importance. Adults are dark brown in colour with faint black bands visible across its entire body. Males and females both help to construct a nest out of water vegetation during breeding time. Eggs are guarded by both parents. Fry are reddish orange and are guarded by both parents until they turn greenish brown at around 5–6 cm.

It is common in freshwater plains, where it migrates from rivers and lakes into flooded fields. Subsequently, it returns to permanent water bodies in the dry season, where it survives by burrowing in the mud.

It preys on frogs, water bugs, and smaller fish, and it will attack anything moving when breeding.

== Local names ==
Common snakeheads are known as ngayan (ငါးရံ့) in Burmese; Nga-mu porom in Meitei, xól/xol (শ'ল/শল) in Assamese, Garai (गरई) in North Indian Languages, Maral or Murrel (मरळ) in Marathi, saur (सौर) in Awadhi, shol (শোল) in Bengali, sol (Urdu: سول) in Pakistan; Sheula (ଶେଉଳ) in Odia, varaal/kannan/braal (Malayalam: വരാല്, കണ്ണൻ,ബ്രാൽ) in Kerala, India; viral/mural/selumural/nedumural (Tamil: விரால்,முறால்,செலுமுரல்,நெடுமுரல்) in Tamil Nadu, India; Korramīnu/Korramatta (Telugu: కొర్రమీను/కొర్రమట్ట) in Andhra Pradesh and Telangana, India; Madenji (Tulu: ಮಡೆಂಜಿ) in Tulu Nadu, India; and Loola (ලූලා) in Sri Lanka; trey ross (Khmer: ត្រីរ៉ស់), pla chon (Thai: ปลาช่อน) in Thailand; gabus in Indonesia; haruan in Malaysia; dalak in Brunei; and haloan, aruan, haruan in Malay; cá lóc đồng in Vietnamese; 生鱼, 泰国鳢 in Chinese; halwan, bulig, dalag, turagsoy or "mudfish" in the Philippines.

== Culinary ==
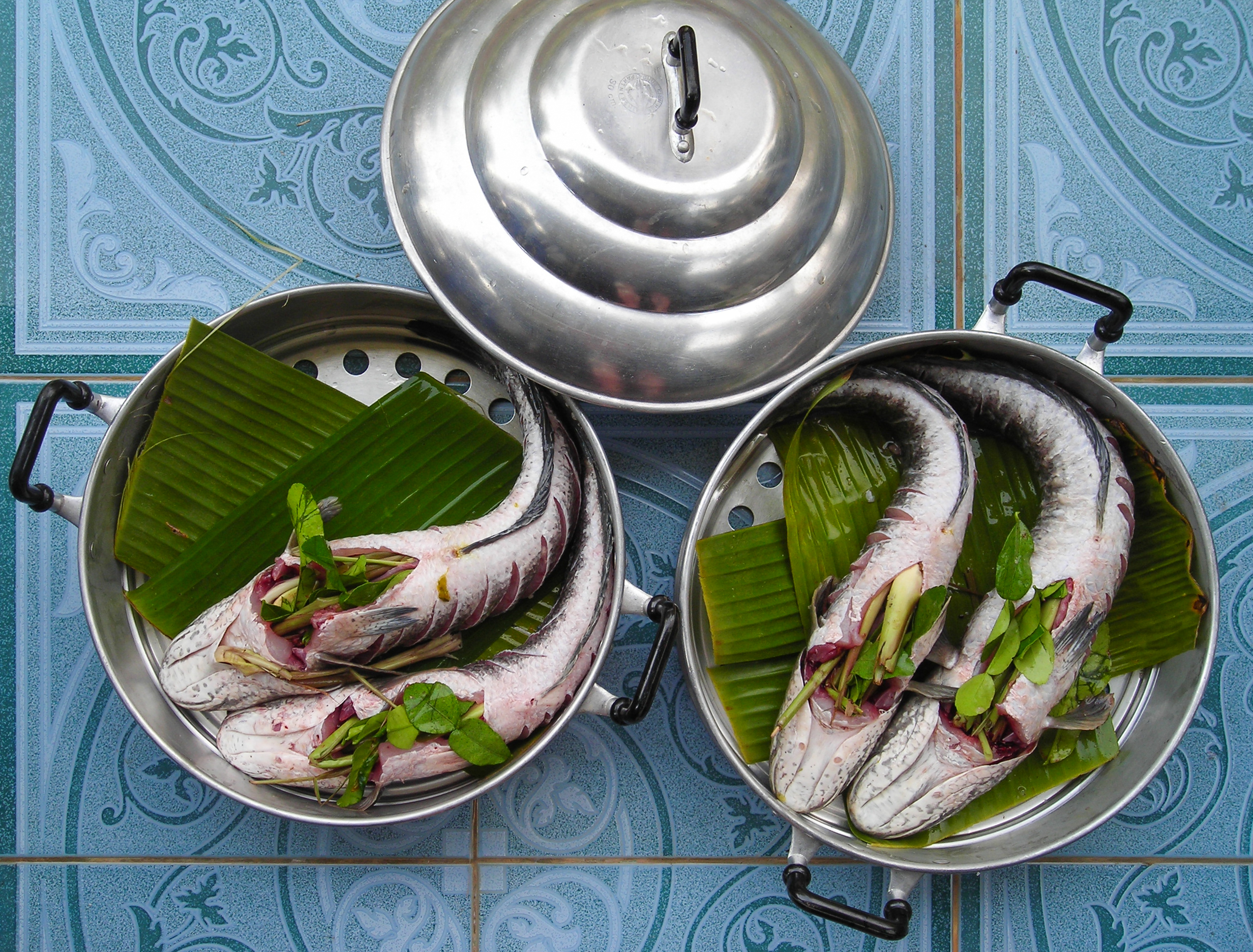
Snakehead fish packed with lemon grass and lime leaves ready for steaming

A curry made with this fish and tapioca is a delicacy in Kerala. In Indonesia, common snakeheads are a popular type of salted fishes in Indonesian cuisine. In the Philippines, they are commonly served either fried, grilled, paksiw (poached in a water-vinegar mix), or with soup called pesa (commonly cooked with rice washing).

Dishes using this fish eaten with rice is very popular among Bengalis of West Bengal and Bangladesh. The fish is also an esteemed delicacy in other parts of India, including Andhra Pradesh, Tamil Nadu and Kerala. It is also the state fish of the Telugu states of Andhra Pradesh and Telangana where it is widely consumed.

Common snakeheads are very popular in Thai cuisine, where they are prepared in a variety of ways. Grilled fish is a common food item offered by street vendors or in kaeng som. Pla ra, a fermented fish sauce popular in northeastern Thai cuisine, is made by pickling common snakehead and keeping it for some time. Also, a Chinese sausage is prepared with common snakehead flesh in Thailand.

In Burmese cuisine, salted striped snakhead ငါးရံ့ခြောက် is popular. Dried salted fish is then grilled ငါးရံ့ခြောက်ဖုတ် or cooked in curry dish. Another delicay dish popular in Lower Myanmar uses only intestines of striped snakhead in the curry instead of the flesh is known as ngayan au sibyan ငါးရံ့အူဆီပြန်.

According to traditional Chinese medicine theories, all snakehead fishes are helpful with wound healing, especially when boiled into soup, which made snakehead fishes a popular choice of food in the Sinosphere.

== Immune system ==
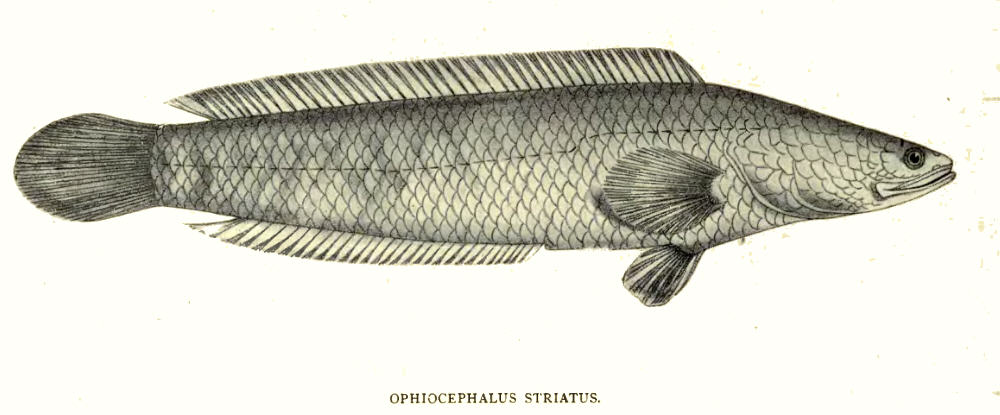

Worldwide inland fish culture industry is suffering from massive economic losses due to epizootic ulcerative syndrome (EUS) and fish-based pathogens. The available literature indicate that infection from fish pathogens like bacteria (Aeromonas hydrophila and Aeromonas sobria), fungi (Aphanomyces invadans) and viruses can cause stunted growth and severe mortality in the C. striatus. Channa striatus rely on their innate immune components to fight against these infections. Some of the immune molecules that have been characterized in Channa striatus includes Chemokine, Chemokine receptors, Thioredoxin, Superoxide dismutase, Serine Protease, Cathepsin, Lectin.

== In culture ==
The Bathini Goud Brothers in Hyderabad, India, promote the swallowing of live murrel fish and herbs claimed as a treatment for asthma, although the high court ruled they cannot call it "medicine". They give it free to children on Mrigasira Nakshatra. No evidence indicates it is clinically effective, and children's rights campaigners have called for it to be banned.
