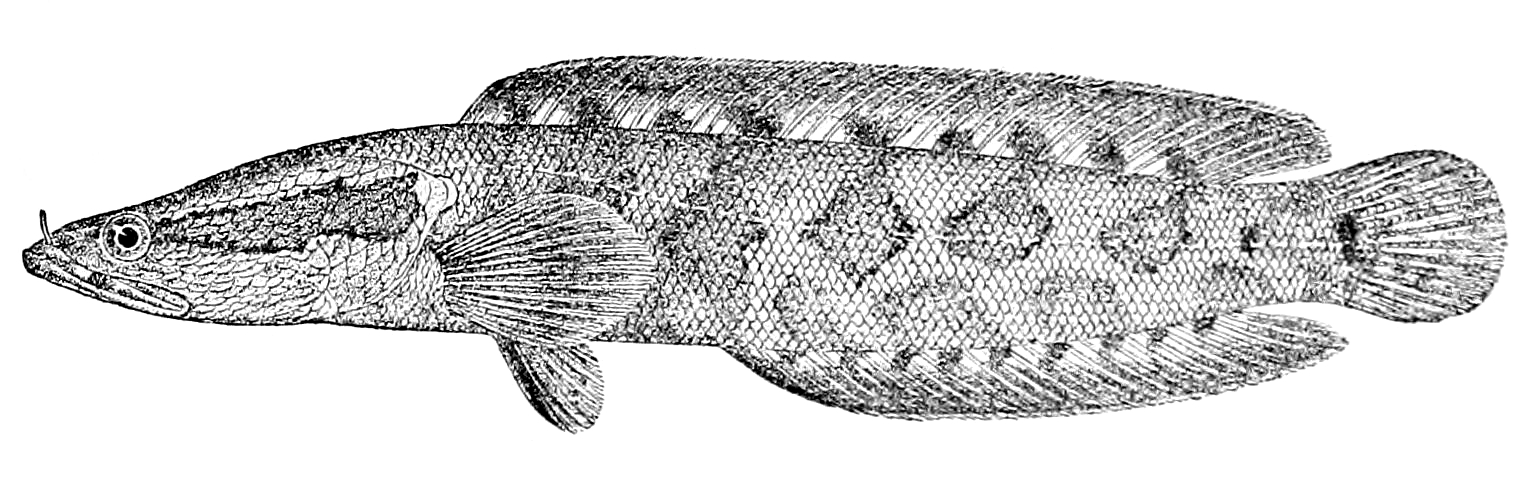

Conservation status
- Least Concern (IUCN 3.1)

Scientific classification
- Kingdom: Animalia
- Phylum: Chordata
- Class: Actinopterygii
- Order: Anabantiformes
- Family: Channidae
- Genus: Parachanna
- Species: P. insignis

Binomial name
- Parachanna insignis (Sauvage, 1884)

Synonyms
- Ophiocephalus insignis Sauvage, 1884; Channa insignis (Sauvage, 1884); Parophiocephalus insignis (Sauvage, 1884)

= Parachanna insignis =

Species of fish

Parachanna insignis is a species of ray-finned fish from the snakehead family, Channidae from western central Africa.
