= Eochanna =

Eochanna Temporal range: Middle Eocene (Early Lutetian)

Scientific classification
- Kingdom: Animalia
- Phylum: Chordata
- Class: Actinopterygii
- Division: Teleostei
- Order: Anabantiformes
- Family: Channidae (?)
- Genus: †Eochanna; Roe, 1991
- Species: †E. chorlakkiensis

Binomial name
- †Eochanna chorlakkiensis Roe, 1991

Extinct species of fish

Eochanna is an extinct genus of freshwater or estuarine ray-finned fish, potentially a snakehead, from the Eocene of Pakistan. It contains a single species, E. chorlakkiensis, from the early Lutetian age (48-47 million years ago) in the area of what is now the Kuldana Formation near Chorlakki.

Described based on an isolated anguloarticular (jaw hinge) bone, Eochanna was initially considered the earliest known snakehead in the fossil record. However, a 2020 study disputed this taxonomic assignment, noting that some of the traits of the bone, used to confirm its placement as a snakehead, are also present in other fish taxa. Thus, the taxonomic placement of Eochanna remains uncertain.
