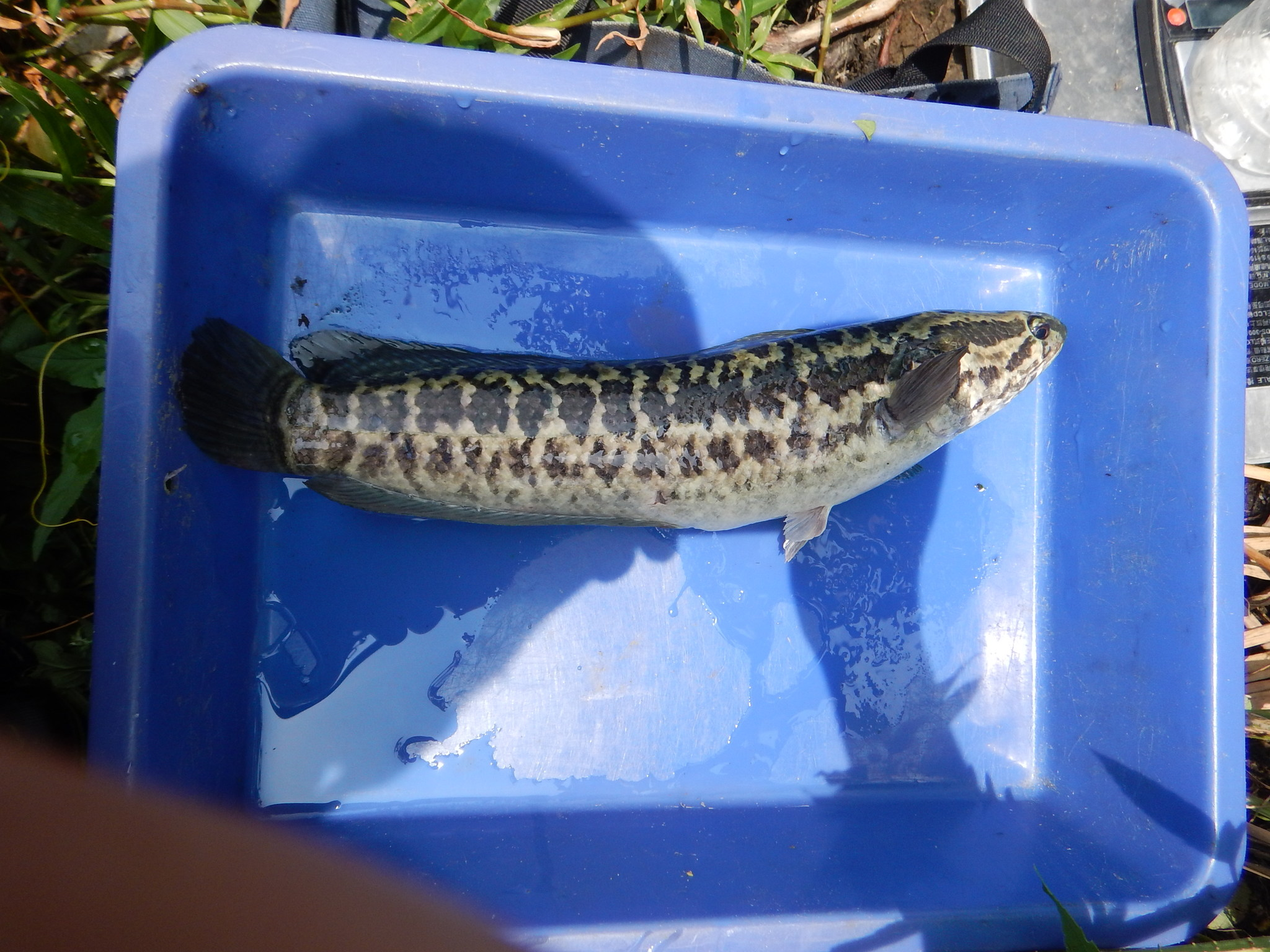

Conservation status
- Least Concern (IUCN 3.1)

Scientific classification
- Kingdom: Animalia
- Phylum: Chordata
- Class: Actinopterygii
- Division: Teleostei
- Order: Anabantiformes
- Family: Channidae
- Genus: Channa
- Species: C. maculata

Binomial name
- Channa maculata (Lacépède, 1801)

Synonyms
- Bostrychus maculatus Lacepède, 1801; Ophicephalus maculatus (Lacepède, 1801); Ophicephalus jovis J. Richardson, 1846; Ophicephalus aspilotus Sauvage & Dabry de Thiersant, 1874; Bostrychoides aspilotus (Sauvage & Dabry de Thiersant, 1874); Ophicephalus guntheri Sauvage & Dabry de Thiersant, 1874; Ophicephalus tadianus Jordan & Evermann, 1902; Ophiocephalus marmoratus Brind, 1914

= Blotched snakehead =

Species of fish

The blotched snakehead (Channa maculata) is a species of freshwater ray-finned fish belonging to the family Channidae, the snakeheads. This species in indigenousto eastern Asia but has been introduced widely elsewhere.

== Taxonomy ==
The blotched snakehead was first formally described as Bostrychus maculatus in 1801 by the French naturalist Bernard Germain de Lacépède with no type locality given but it is thought likely to be Guangdong in China. There is no holotype known and the Lacepède may have been describing a drawing which may have been of an eleotrid goby, in which case the next available name is Channa aspilotus. This species currently classified in the genus Channa, the Asian snakeheads, which is the type genus of the snakehead family Channidae which is within the suborder Channoidei of the order Anabantiformes, which alos includes th gouramis, Aisan leaffishes and related fishes.

== Etymology ==
The blotched snakehead is classified in the genus Channa, a name which was first used by Gronow in 1763 and was made formally available by Scopoli in 1777. Its etymology is unknown but it is thought likely to derive from the Greek "channe" or "channos", a name given to a wide-mouthed sea fish. The specific name, maculata, means "spotted", Lacepède described this species as having small green spots all over its body, in fact it has large green blotches.

== Description ==
The blotched snakehead has an elongated body and reaches a standard length of 26.6 cm (10.5 in), although 11 cm (4.3 in) is more typical. This species lacks a patch of scales on its throat. The dorsal profile of the head is concave. There are between 40 and 46 rays in the dorsal fin and 26-30 in the anal fin. The continuous lateral line has 41 to 60 scales. There is a dark stripe from tip of snout through the eyes reaching to nearly above the forward base of the pectoral fin. Aother dark stripe runs from the lower rear edge of the eye to the lower rear margin of the operculum. There are two rows of large, dark blotches running along the body to the front of the caudal peduncle, which also has two bars. There are dark blotches on the back which extend onto the lower parts of the dorsal fin.

== Distribution and habitat ==
The blotched snake head is indigenous to Pacific versant drainages in east Asia, although it has been widely introduced outside its native range. The indigenous range includes the Yangtze River, Minjiang River, Hanjiang River, Pearl River and Nandu River in the Peoples' Republic of China, Hainan, northern Vietnam and Taiwan. It has been introduced and becaome established in Madagascar, Japan and Hawaii. It failed to establish a sustanable population in the mainland United States and its presence in the Philippines is uncertain. These fishes are found on silty muddy beds of slow moving or still waters, they are ambush predators which need caves and aquatic vegetation to hide in.

In Madagascar it was introduced around 1978 when the president, Didier Ratsiraka imported them from Vietnam, the imported batch was split in two, some were introduced into ponds in the grounds of the Presidential Palace in Antananarivo and the remainder into ponds near Vatomandry. Subsequent flooding allowed many to escape and the species is now widespread in Madagascar, where it is reported to cause ecological harm and is implicated in the local extinction of endemic fishes and amphibians.

== Biology ==
The blotched snakehead is able to breathe atmospheric air, allowing these fishes to enduree in moist conditions in air over a extended periods. This ambush predator which preys on small fish, shrimp and frogs. The adults form pairs when breeding, which occurs in shallow freshwater areas with aquatic vegetation. The adults clear the plants in the area of the nest, which is a bubble nest covering 0.4 to 06 m^{2} (4.3 to 64.6 sq ft), and the floating eggs are laid under the nest, adhering to each other. The spawning season occurs from May to October, varying by location. While breeding the pair live together and breeding occurs in the vicinity of pond dikes, paddy fields and rivers. After the eggs hatch the adults remain in around the nest, protecting and nursing the juveniles until the juveniles are able to forage and avoid predators on their own.

== Utilisation ==
The blotched snakehead is the second most important species of snakehead in Chinese aquaculture. They are mainly cultured in Guangdong. They are also cultured in other parts of the world, such as Japan, Java and the Philippines, but their importation into the United States is banned.
