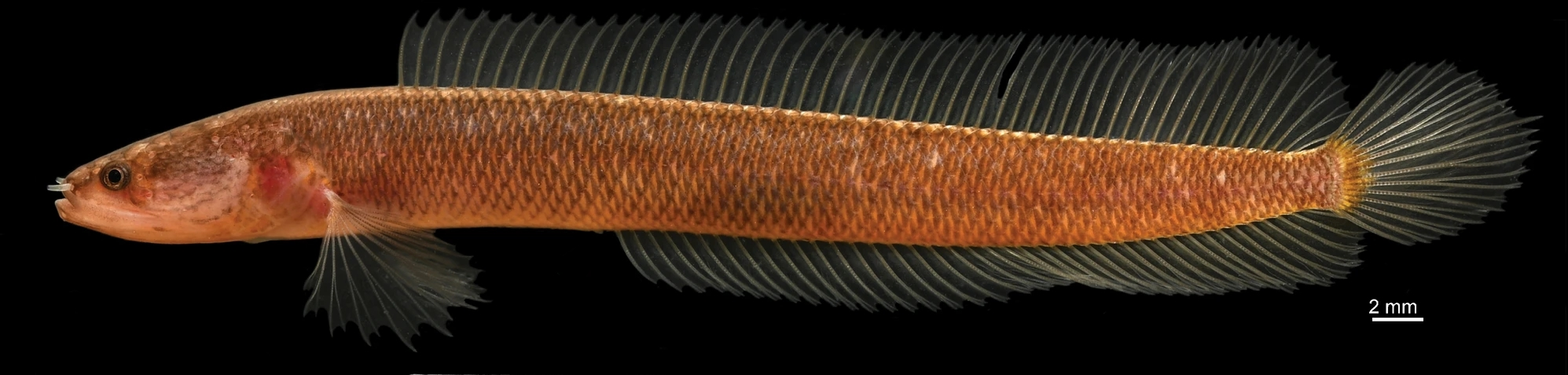
- Aenigmachanna gollum

Scientific classification
- Kingdom: Animalia
- Phylum: Chordata
- Class: Actinopterygii
- Clade: Percomorpha
- Order: Anabantiformes
- Suborder: Channoidei
- Family: Aenigmachannidae; Britz, Dahanukar, Anoop, Philip, Clark, Raghavan & Rüber, 2020
- Genus: Aenigmachanna; Britz, Anoop, Dahanukar and Raghavan, 2019

Type species
- Aenigmachanna gollum Britz, Anoop, Dahanukar & Raghavan, 2019

Species
- 2, see text.

= Aenigmachanna =

Genus of fishes

Aenigmachanna is a genus of ray-finned fish in the order Ananbantiformes. It is the only genus in the family Aenigmachannidae, or dragon snakeheads. It contains two species, both of which are largely restricted to subterranean habitats in southwestern India, namely in the Western Ghats foothills in the state of Kerala.

Both of the species in this genus display a unique array of traits that distinguish them from their closest living relatives, the true snakeheads in the family Channidae. These include a much longer and more slender body, numerous scales, a very long anal fin, and a lack of ability to maintain buoyancy. Molecular analyses indicate that they split off from Channidae around 34 or 109 MYA. This may indicate that Aenigmachannidae is a uniquely Gondwanan lineage, and if the higher end of estimations is correct, it may have survived the breakup of the Gondwanan supercontinent around 120 MYA.

They are unique among cavefish for being one of the few cave-dwelling members of the large clade Percomorpha. Despite their habitat, they physically display little troglomorphism aside from a slightly reduced pigmentation, indicating that they either colonized the caves relatively recently or that they are subtroglophiles that mostly live underground, but depend on aboveground habitats for some functions. Due to their restricted habitat and unique nature, both are considered relict species.

== Taxonomy ==
=== Species ===
- Aenigmachanna gollum Britz, Anoop, Dahanukar and Raghavan, 2019 (Gollum snakehead)
- Aenigmachanna mahabali Kumar, Basheer, and Ravi, 2019 (Mahabali snakehead)

The genus was initially described in early 2019 to serve as a monotypic genus for A. gollum, the first species to be described in the genus. Later in the year, A. mahabali was described as a distinct species, indicating that there were indeed multiple species in the genus.
