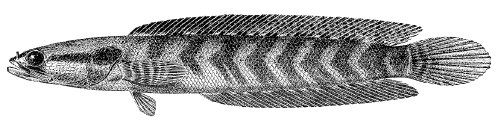

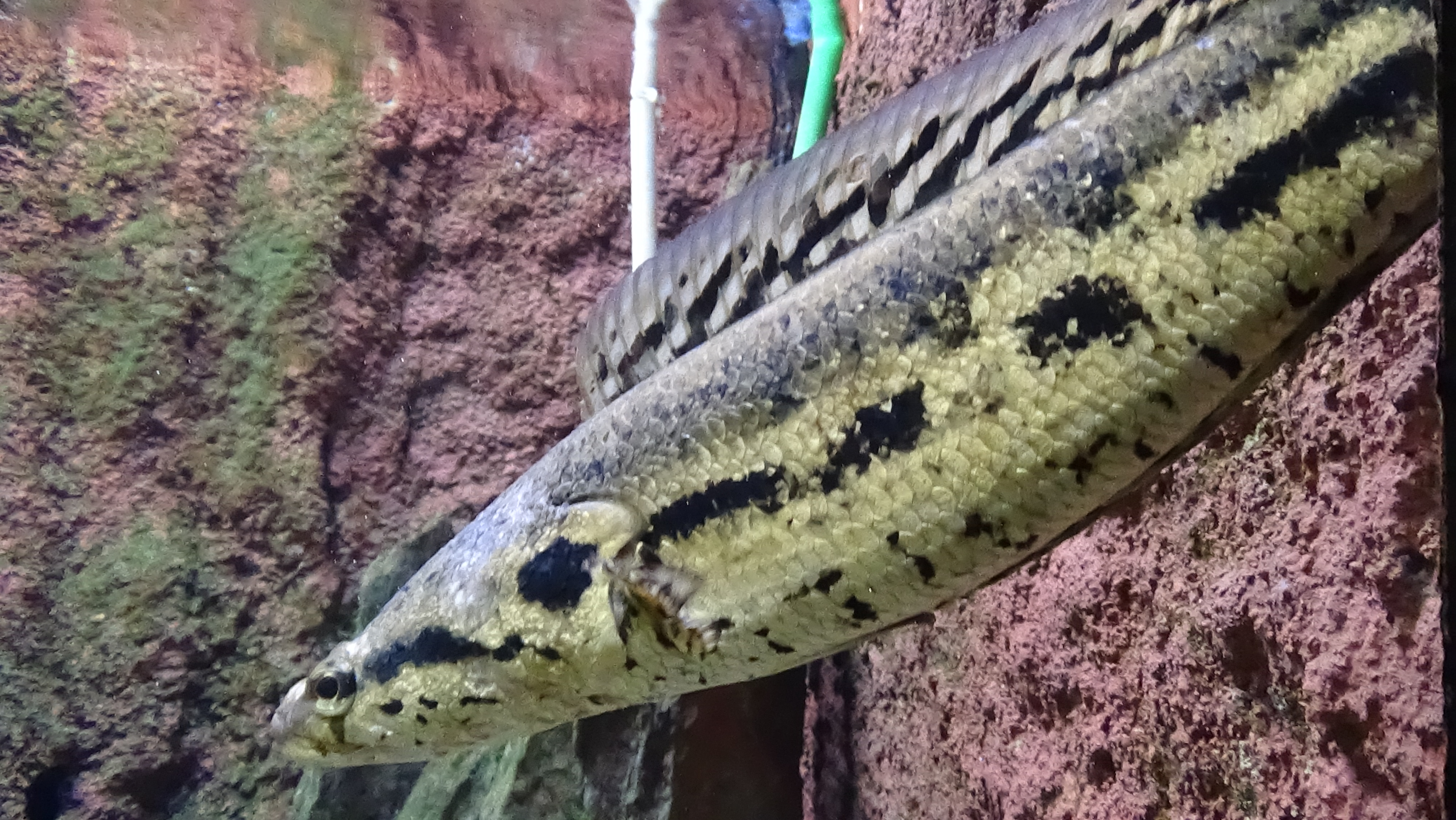
- P. africana (above), P. obscura (below)

Scientific classification
- Kingdom: Animalia
- Phylum: Chordata
- Class: Actinopterygii
- Division: Teleostei
- Order: Anabantiformes
- Family: Channidae
- Genus: Parachanna; Teugels & Daget, 1984

Type species
- Ophiocephalus obscurus Günther, 1861

Species
- See text
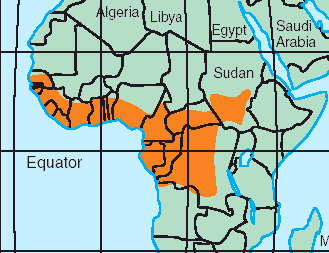
- Combined range of the Parachanna species

= Parachanna =

Genus of fishes

Parachanna is a genus of snakeheads native to freshwater habitats in tropical Africa. Three recognized extant (living) species are in this genus, but a phylogenetic study from 2017 indicates that a fourth, currently undescribed species also exists.

One fossil species, Parachanna fayumensis Murray, 2006 dated to the Upper Eocene and Lower Oligocene is known from the Jebel Qatrani Formation of the Fayum Depression, Egypt.

== Species ==
The three recognized extant species in this genus are:

- Parachanna africana (Steindachner, 1879) (African snakehead)
- Parachanna insignis (Sauvage, 1884) (brown snakehead)
- Parachanna obscura (Günther, 1861) (obscure snakehead)
