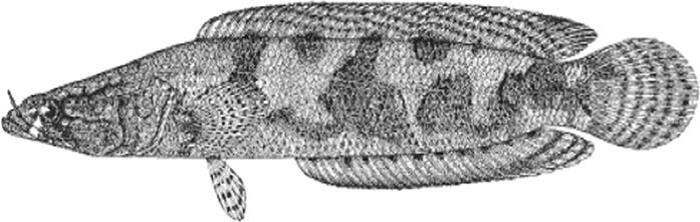

Conservation status
- Least Concern (IUCN 3.1)

Scientific classification
- Kingdom: Animalia
- Phylum: Chordata
- Class: Actinopterygii
- Division: Teleostei
- Order: Anabantiformes
- Family: Channidae
- Genus: Parachanna
- Species: P. obscura

Binomial name
- Parachanna obscura (Günther, 1861)
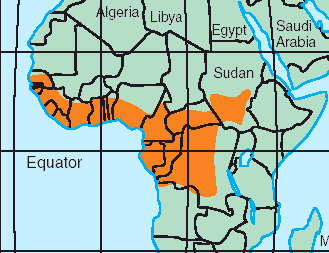
- Distribution of Parachanna spp.

Synonyms
- Ophiocephalus obscurus Günther, 1861; Channa obscura (Günther, 1861); Channa obscurus (Günther, 1861); Ophicephalus obscurus (Günther, 1861); Paraphiocephalus obscurus (Günther, 1861); Parophiocephalus obscurus (Günther, 1861)

= Obscure snakehead =

Species of fish

The obscure snakehead (Parachanna obscura) is a species of snakehead in the family Channidae. This species is found in central Africa along the western coastline from as far north as Senegal to as far south as Zaire and into southwest Sudan.

== Morphology ==
Parachanna obscura is a medium-sized carnivorous fish with an elongated shape tapered on both ends, and is covered in medium circular (cycloid) scales. The head, resembling a snake, is long and depressed anteriorly and covered with cycloid scales slightly larger than those scales on the body. The eyes are laterally located and large, helping to locate its prey quickly. Two pairs of nostrils occur on either side of the head. The mouth is large, and because the lower jaw is slightly longer than the upper jaw (giving it an "underbite"), the fish is able to thrust out its lower jaw (protract) to catch its prey. The fish has two rows of teeth. The outer row consists of small, sharp, conical teeth, and the inner row consists of four to six large canine-like teeth. P. obscura has a single lateral line. P.obscura larvae are yellow in color, transitioning to an ochre base coloration with a black stripe down its flank from the snout to the caudal fin. The coloration of P. obscura adults and juveniles consists of dark blackish, rounded spots found along the flanks. The ventral side of the fish has a yellowish, reddish, and brownish marbling pattern. Dark spots on the back and lateral dark bands on the head help to define the fish.

== Geographic range and habitat ==
Three Parachanna species are extant, all restricted to Africa. They include P. fayumensis (fossil), P. africana, P. insignis, and the most common, P. obscura. P. obscura is the most widespread of the African species, being found in the Lake Chad basin, and the Nile, Congo, Cross, Niger, and Senegal River basins.

The obscure snakehead is benthopelagic (a bottom dweller) and potamodromous (freshwater migratory), and thrives in harsh environments, including muddy waters. This fish lives in streams, ponds, rivers, lakes, marshes, lagoons, swamps, and floodplains. The obscure snakehead is locally referred to as the "sleeping fish", as it spends much of its time motionless among the aquatic vegetation. It lives in waters greater than 20 °C (68 °F) and is found primarily within the intertropical convergent zone.

== Biology ==
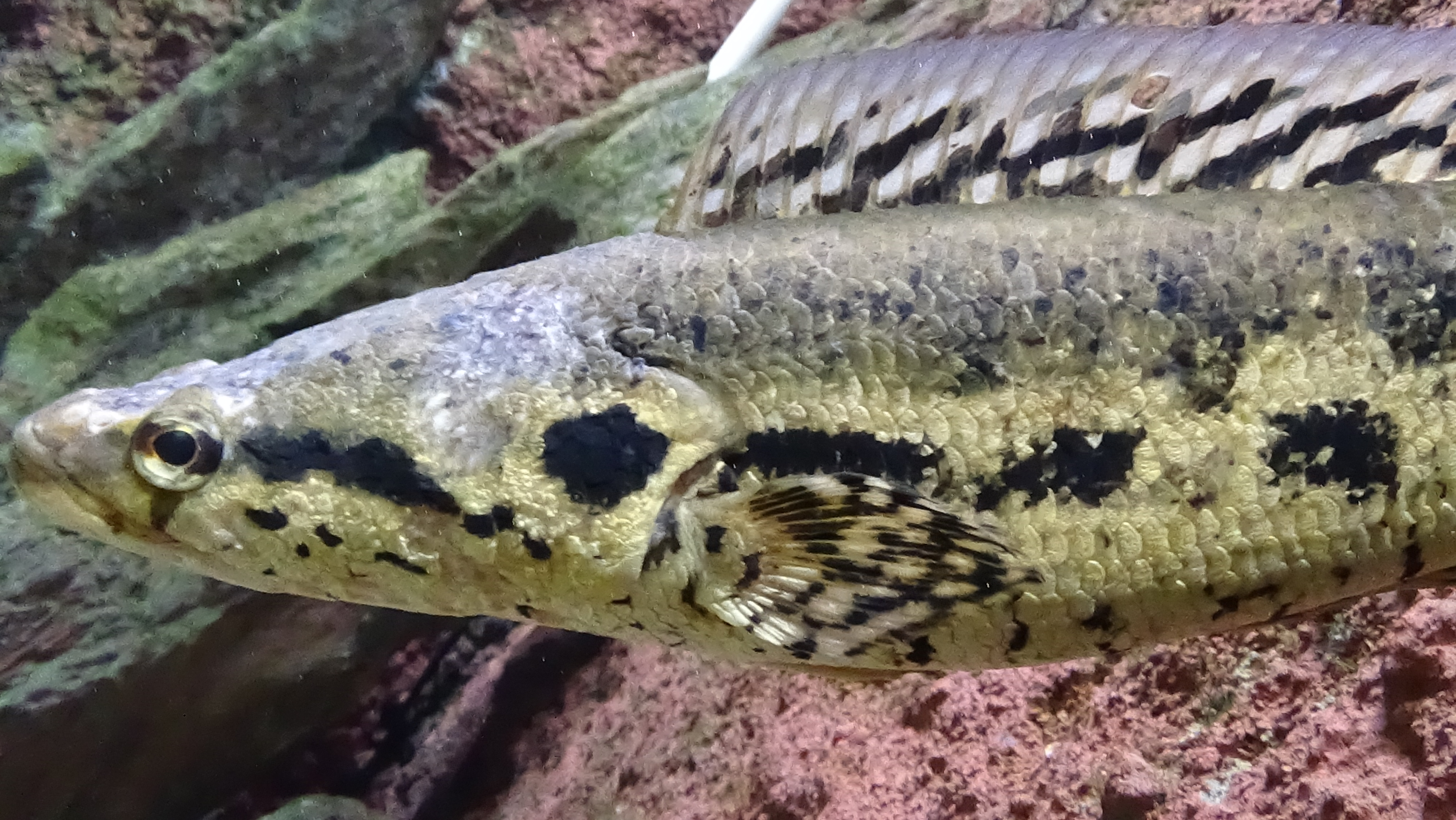
at the Porte Dorée Aquarium, Paris

=== Diet ===
Obscure snakeheads are carnivorous fish. Adults feed primarily on other fish up to half their size, while juveniles feed on insect larvae, insects, prawns, and copepods.

=== Life cycle ===
Determining the sex of the obscure snakehead can only be done through the dissection to examine the gonads; like many fish, this species isn't visibly sexually dimorphic. Reproduction happens throughout the year, especially during and right after flooding in the wet season. Males and females change color during spawning; the males change from brown to bright blue and the females' brown spots turn a deeper dark brown and the bright spots on their fins turn blue, and both male and female pectoral fins turn white at the tips. The female lays her eggs and the male immediately fertilizes them. Incubation time varies depending on the temperature of the water and amount of light to which the eggs are exposed. The adults both share in the responsibility of protecting the young until they reach a length of about 3 mm. This fish can gain about 2 g (0.071 oz)/day and reach a weight of 1 kg (2.2 lb) within 4–5 months. An adult P. obscura has been measured at 54 cm (21 in).

== Commercial importance ==
The obscure snakehead is being considered as an emerging aquaculture species in Africa. The fish is very fleshy, has few bones, and is high in protein. An issue of concern is the way the fish are harvested. The use of poison, fire, and dynamite as fishing tools, along with the improper netting of fish, are hurting the fish population, as well as those humans consuming the fish.
