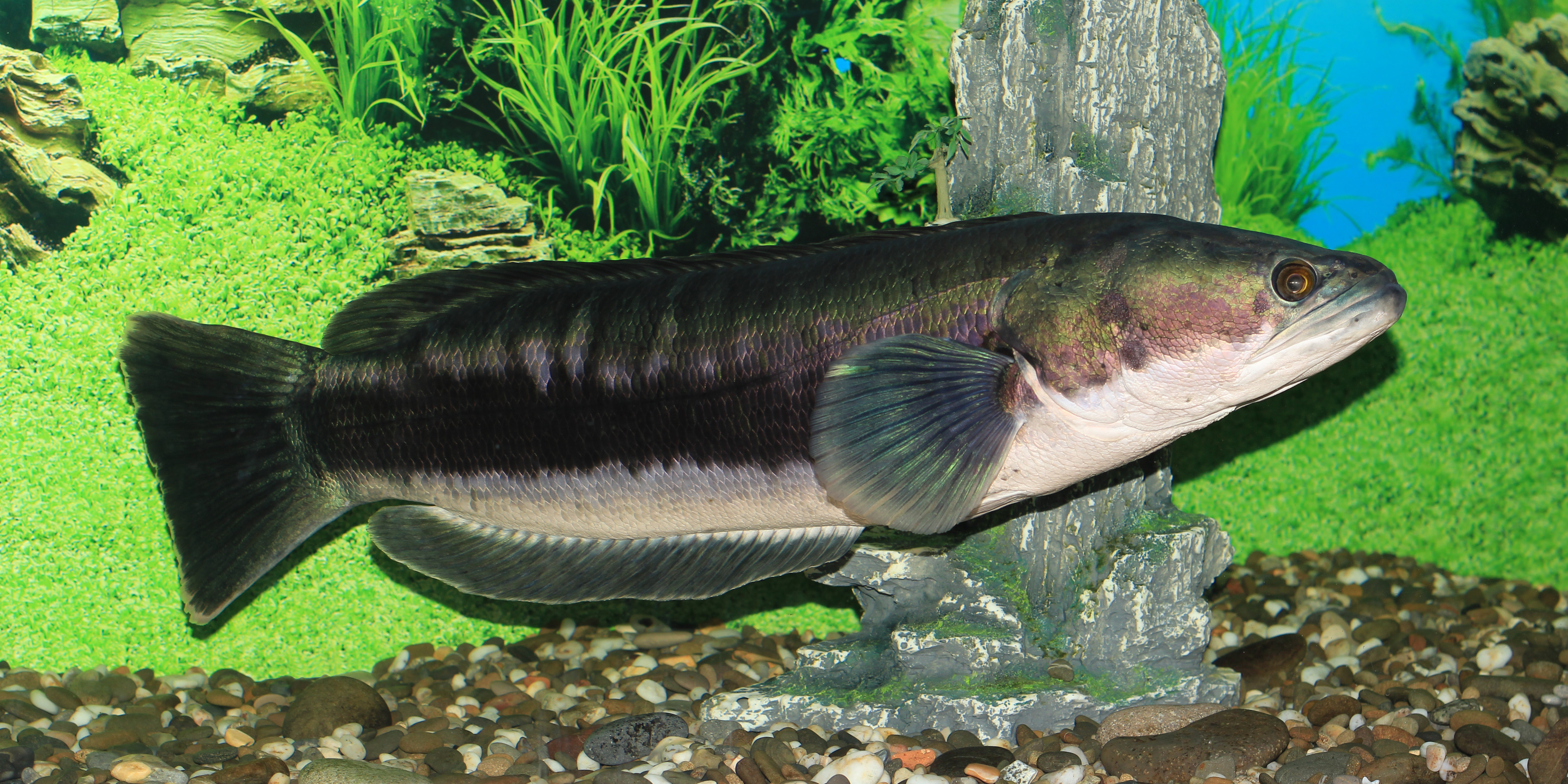
- Channa micropeltes

Scientific classification
- Kingdom: Animalia
- Phylum: Chordata
- Class: Actinopterygii
- Division: Teleostei
- Order: Anabantiformes
- Suborder: Channoidei; Berg, 1940

Families
- Channidae; Channa; Parachanna; Aenigmachannidae; Aenigmachanna

= Channoidei =

Suborder of fishes

Channoidei is a suborder of fish in the order Anabantiformes. It contains two families: the true snakeheads (Channidae) and the dragon snakeheads (Aenigmachannidae).
