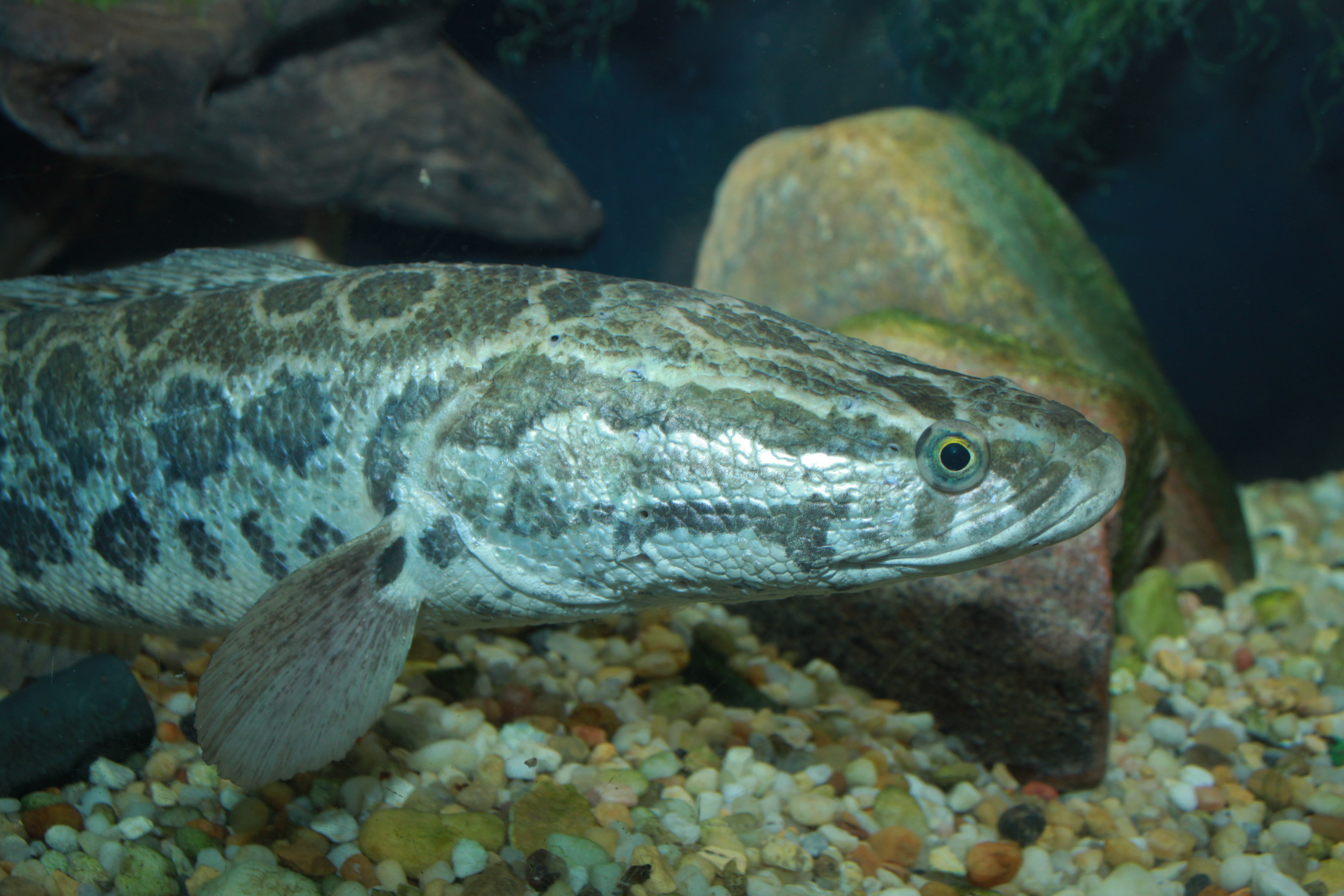
- Northern snakehead, Channa argus

Scientific classification
- Kingdom: Animalia
- Phylum: Chordata
- Class: Actinopterygii
- Division: Teleostei
- Order: Anabantiformes
- Suborder: Channoidei
- Family: Channidae; Fowler, 1934

Genera
- See text

= Snakehead (fish) =

Snakehead Temporal range: Eocene to recent, 48.6–0 Ma

Family of fishes

The snakeheads are members of the freshwater perciform fish family Channidae, native to parts of Africa and Asia. These elongated, predatory fish are distinguished by their long dorsal fins, large mouths, and shiny teeth. They breathe air with gills, which allows them to migrate short distances over land. They have suprabranchial organs, which are primitive forms of labyrinth organs, that develop when they grow older. The two extant genera are Channa in Asia and Parachanna in Africa, consisting of more than 50 species.

They are valuable as a food source and have become notorious as an intentionally released invasive species. These fish have been kept as pets, but as they get larger, people let them go into ponds, lakes, and rivers, making these fish invasive.

== Description ==
The various species of snakeheads differ greatly in size; dwarf snakeheads, such as Channa orientalis, do not surpass 25 cm (10 in) in length. Most other snakeheads reach between 30 and 90 cm (12 and 35 in). Five species (C. argus, C. barca, C. marulius, C. micropeltes, and C. striata) can reach 1.0 m (3 ft 3 in) or more.

Snakeheads are thrust-feeders that consume plankton, aquatic insects, and mollusks when small. As adults, they mostly feed on other fish (such as carp) or on frogs. In rare cases, small rodents such as rats are eaten.

== History ==
The Channidae are well represented in the fossil record and known from numerous specimens. They likely originated in the south Himalayan region of the Indian subcontinent (modern-day northern India and eastern Pakistan) at least 50 million years ago (Mya), during the Early Eocene epoch. Two of the earliest known species, Eochanna chorlakkiensis and Anchichanna kuldanensis, have both been found in the Middle Eocene of Pakistan. By 17 Mya, during the Early Miocene, Channidae had spread into western and central Eurasia, and by 8 Mya, during the late Tortonian, they existed throughout Africa and East Asia. As the Channidae are adapted to climates of high precipitation with mean temperatures of 20 °C (68 °F), their migrations into Europe and Asia correspond to the development of the Intertropical Convergence Zone, which increased air humidity, and the intensification of the East Asian monsoon. Both weather patterns emerged due to greater vertical growth of the Alps, Pyrenees, and Himalayas, which affected Eurasian climatic patterns.

== Ecological concerns ==
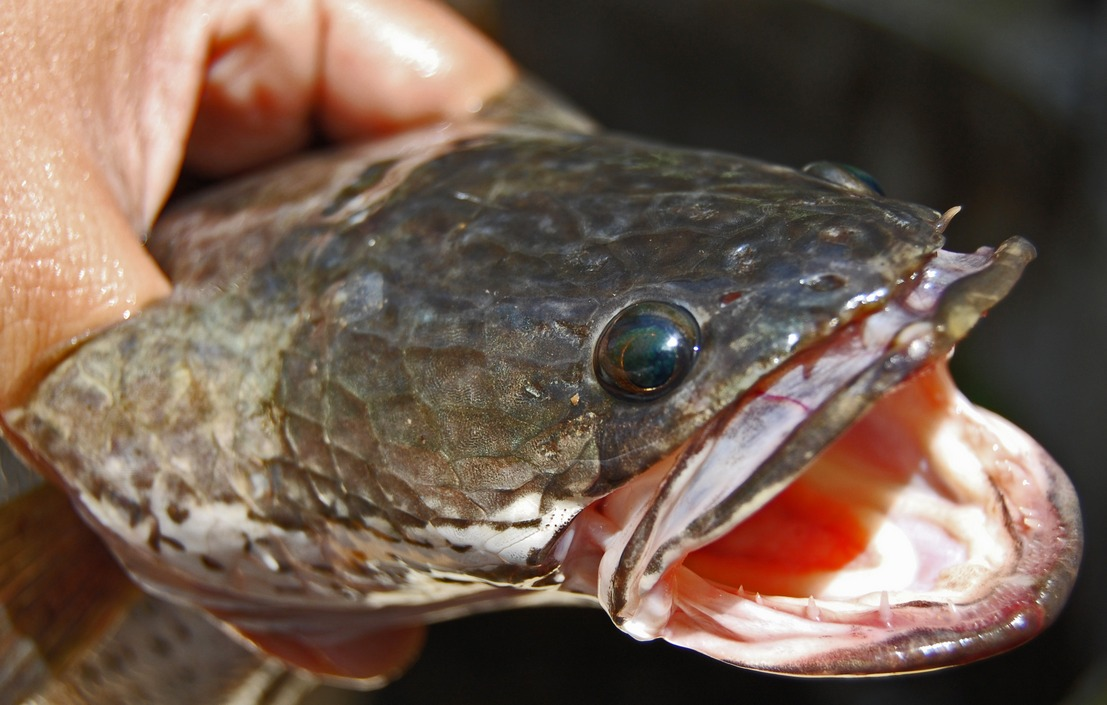
Snakehead murrel, Channa striata, Java, Indonesia

Snakeheads can become invasive species and cause ecological damage because, in many areas to which they are not native, the absence of natural enemies makes them an apex predator. Not only can they breathe air, but they can also survive on land for up to four days, provided they are wet, and are known to migrate up to 400 m (1/4 mi) on wet land to other bodies of water by wriggling with their bodies and fins. National Geographic has referred to snakeheads as "fishzilla" and the National Geographic Channel reported the "northern snakehead reaches sexual maturity by age two or three. Each spawning-age female can release up to 15,000 eggs at once. Snakeheads can mate as often as five times a year. This means in just two years, a single female can release up to 150,000 eggs."

"Since 2002, it has been illegal to possess a live snakehead in many U.S. states, where they are considered a destructive invasive species." Virginia has criminalized the "introduction" of snakeheads into the state without specific authorization, although the relevant statute does not explain whether mere importation is sufficient to constitute "introduction into the Commonwealth" or whether instead release into the environment is required.

=== Intentional introductions ===
Humans have been introducing snakeheads to nonindigenous waters for over 100 years. In parts of Asia and Africa, the snakehead is considered a valuable food fish, since the flesh is very tender and is produced in aquacultures (fisheries motivation) or by accidental release (as was the case in Crofton, Maryland). Examples of the introduction of snakeheads to nonindigenous waters include:

- Channa maculata was introduced to Madagascar and to Hawaii around the end of the 19th century. It can still be found there today.
- Channa striata was introduced to islands east of the Wallace line by governmental programs in the latter half of the 20th century. In Fiji, the introduction failed.
- Channa asiatica, which is native to southern China, was introduced to Taiwan and southern Japan; the origin of and reason for the introduction are unknown.
- Channa argus, which is native to northern China's Amur River, was introduced to central Asia (Kazakhstan, Turkmenistan, and Uzbekistan). It was introduced from the Korean Peninsula to Japan about 100 years ago due to fisheries' motivations. Its introduction to Czechoslovakia by its government in the 1960s failed.

=== Reported sightings ===
==== In the United States ====
Snakeheads became a national news topic in the United States because of the appearance of C. argus, commonly known as northern snakeheads, spawning in a Crofton, Maryland, pond in 2002. Northern snakeheads became permanently established in the Potomac River around 2004, and possibly established in Florida. In about 120 mi (190 km) of river, the population has surpassed 21,000 individuals.

According to the United States Environmental Protection Agency, snakeheads have also been spotted in California, Delaware, Florida, Georgia, Hawaii, Maine, Maryland, Massachusetts, Virginia, Louisiana, and Rhode Island. Snakeheads have also been spotted in New York State according to the state's Department of Environmental Conservation. Northern snakeheads have also been confirmed in Missouri, where the species has been documented in the St. Francis and Eleven Point river systems. Snakeheads have been caught in New Jersey since at least 2008, and according to the New Jersey Department of Environmental Protection, the snakehead population appears to be growing and expanding its distribution. Due to the extensive habitat available and sheer size of the Delaware River, complete eradication of the species does not appear to be feasible.

==== World record ====
According to the International Game Fish Association, two 13.61 kg (30 lb 0 oz) giant snakeheads, both from Rawang, Malaysia, are tied for the record.

== Culinary use ==
Snakeheads are valuable food fish. Called nga yant in Burmese and in Manipur [Meiteilon] porom, they are prized fish eaten in a variety of ways. In the southern Indian state of Kerala, it is used to make Varal curry, named after the Malayalam name of the state, Varal (Malayalam: വരാൽ). In Vietnam, they are called cá lóc, cá quả, or cá chuối, and are served in clay-pot, steamed, and pickled preparations. Larger species, such as C. striata, C. maculata, and Parachanna obscura, are farmed in aquaculture. In the United States, chefs have suggested controlling the snakehead invasion by serving them in restaurants. In Indonesia, snakehead fish, called ikan gabus, are served as the main parts of traditional dishes such as the Betawi people's pucung gabus, and considered to be a delicacy due to their rarity in the wild and in aquaculture, as they are harder to raise than other popular freshwater fish such as catfish and carp. In the Philippines, where it is called haluan (the Tagalogs call it dalag), it is a favorite among Maguindanaons and Iranuns.

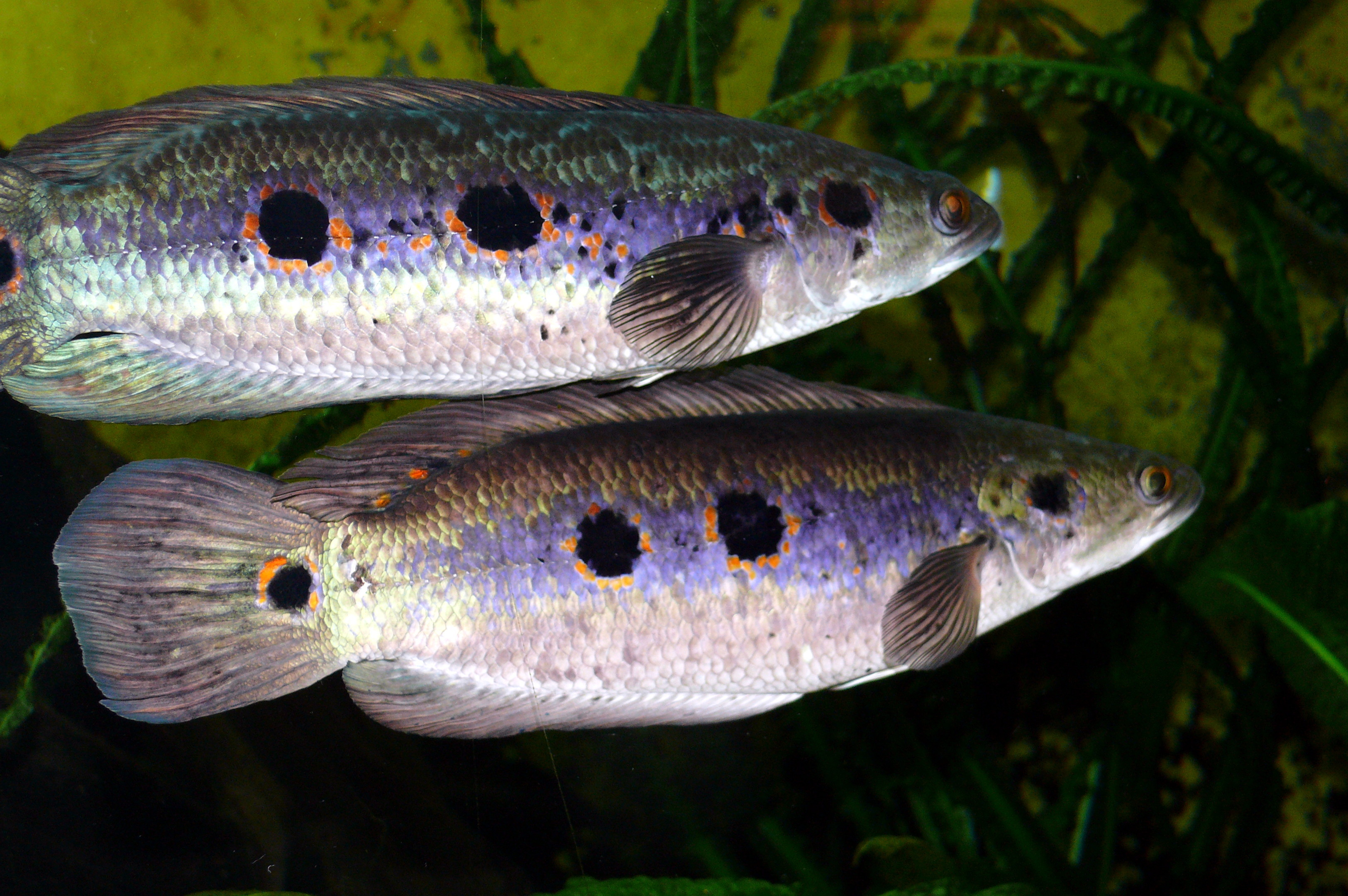
C. pleurophthalma

== Classification ==
The snakeheads comprise two extant genera:

- Channa Scopoli, 1777 (49 species native to Asia)
- Parachanna Teugels & Daget 1984 (three extant species, one fossil species, all native to Africa)

Two other genera are only known from fossils:

- †Anchichanna Murray & Thewissen, 2008 (one species)
- †Eochanna Roe, 1991 (one species)

The genus Aenigmachanna was initially classified in the Channidae upon its discovery, but analysis supports it being reclassified into its own family, Aenigmachannidae.

== In popular culture ==
After its release in non-native North American waters, either accidentally or intentionally, the aggressive and predator-free snakehead's reputation as a "Frankenfish" or "monster fish" has become part of popular culture. Snakeheads have been mentioned on TV shows such as The Sopranos and The Office.

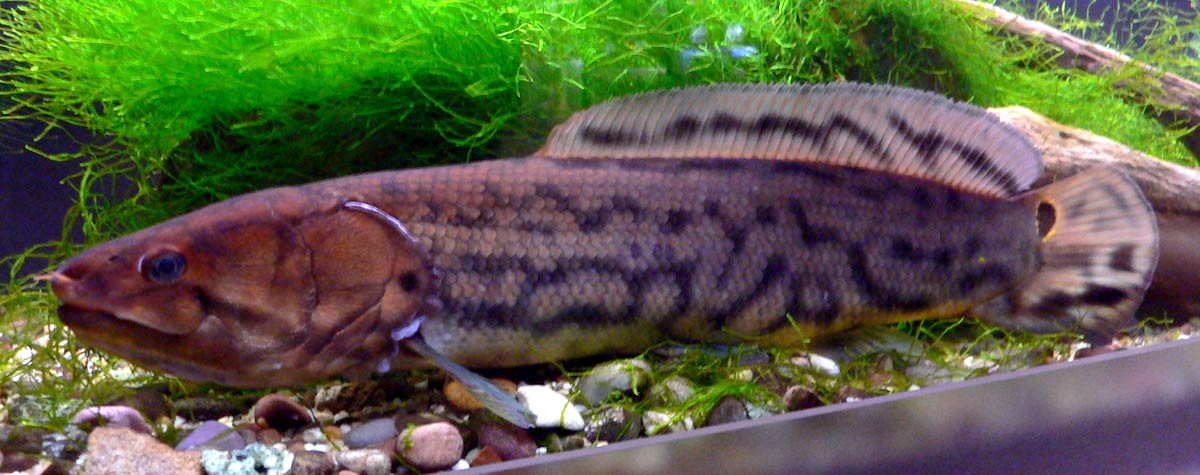
A bowfin, a living fossil, often confused with the snakehead

== See also ==
- Amphibious fish
- Bowfin
